= Josh Freese discography =

This is the discography of American session drummer and songwriter Josh Freese. Freese has appeared on close to 500 records. He is an original member of A Perfect Circle and a member of the Vandals as well as Devo. He was the drummer for Nine Inch Nails from late 2005 until late 2008 and again since mid-2025, and for Guns N' Roses from mid-1998 to 1999. Freese was the new drummer for Foo Fighters from 2023 to 2025.

== Discography ==
=== Solo ===
- The Notorious One Man Orgy (2000)
- Since 1972 (2009)
- My New Friends (2011)

=== With The Vandals ===
- Fear of a Punk Planet (1990)
- Sweatin' to the Oldies: The Vandals Live (1994)
- Live Fast, Diarrhea (1995)
- Oi to the World!: Christmas With the Vandals (1996)
- The Quickening (1996)
- Hitler Bad, Vandals Good (1998)
- Look What I Almost Stepped In (2000)
- Internet Dating Superstuds (2002)
- Hollywood Potato Chip (2004)

=== With A Perfect Circle ===
- Mer de Noms (2000)
- Thirteenth Step (2003)
- Emotive (2004)

=== As featured artist ===
Year	Artist	Album
1991	Dweezil Zappa	Confessions
1991	Tender Fury	If Anger Were Soul I'd Be James Brown
1992	Xtra Large	Now I Eat Them
1992	Suicidal Tendencies	The Art of Rebellion
1993	Infectious Grooves	Sarsippius' Ark
1993	School Of Fish	Human Cannonball
1993	Paul Westerberg	14 Songs
1993	Lee Ving	Lee Ving
1994	The Daredevils	Hate You
1994	Seo Taiji and Boys	Seo Taiji and Boys III
1995	Possum Dixon	Star Maps
1995	Juliana Hatfield	Only Everything
1995	Earl Lee Grace	Blackgrass
1995	Devo	Tank Girl Soundtrack
1995	Strung Out	Somnombulance Split W/ Blount
1995	Wayne Kramer	The Hard Stuff
1995	Magnapop	Rubbing Doesn't Help
1995	Seo Taiji and Boys	Seo Taiji and Boys IV
1996	Tracy Bonham	The Burdens of Being Upright
1996	Paul Westerberg	Eventually
1996	Crumb	Romance Is A Slowdance
1996	Danny Elfman	Freeway Soundtrack
1996	Lazlo Bane	Short Style
1997	Lazlo Bane	11 Transistor
1997	Rickie Lee Jones	Ghosty Head
1997	Bic Runga	Drive
1997	Mary Lou Lord	Martian Saints EP
1997	Meredith Brooks	Blurring the Edges
1997	Slider	Sudden Fun
1998	Princess	Destroy The Earth As Soon As Possible (Solo EP, released under another name)
1998	Mike Ness	Cheating at Solitaire
1998	Emm Gryner	Public
1998	Crumb	>Seconds>Minutes>Hours>
1998	Mary Lou Lord	Got No Shadow
1998	New Radicals	Maybe You've Been Brainwashed Too
1998	The Wailing Souls	Psychedelic Souls
1998	Hayden	The Closer I Get
1999	Bob and Mark Mothersbaugh	200 Cigarettes Soundtrack
1999	Paul Westerberg	Suicaine Gratifaction
1999	Chris Cornell	Euphoria Morning
1999	Guns N' Roses	Oh My God (End of Days Soundtrack)
1999	Shawn Mullins	First Ten Years
2000	DEVO	Pioneers Who Got Scalped
2000	Poe	Haunted
2000	John Doe	Freedom Is...
2000	Tracy Bonham	Down Here
2000	Hoku	Hoku
2000	Leona Naess	Comatised
2000	Nash Kato	Debutante
2000	F.Y.P	Toys That Kill
2001	SinOMatic	SinOMatic
2001	Puddle Of Mudd	Come Clean
2001	Abandoned Pools	Humanistic
2001	Buffy the Vampire Slayer	"Once More, With Feeling" Soundtrack
2001	Rob Zombie	The Sinister Urge
2002	Seether	Disclaimer
2002	12 Stones	12 Stones
2002	3 Doors Down	Away from the Sun
2002	Rhett Miller	The Instigator
2002	Avril Lavigne	Let Go
2002	Unwritten Law	Elva
2002	MOTH	Provisions, Fiction and Gear
2003	The Offspring	Splinter
2003	Viva Death	Self Titled
2003	The Format	Interventions + Lullabies
2003	The Lovemakers	Times of Romance
2003	Kelly Clarkson	Thankful
2003	Evanescence	Fallen
2003	Good Charlotte	The Young & the Hopeless
2003	Ween	Quebec
2003	Clay Aiken	Measure of a Man
2003	Desert Sessions	Volumes 9 & 10
2003	Seo Taiji	6th Album Re-Recording and ETPFEST Live
2003	The Damning Well	"Awakening" (from Underworld Soundtrack)
2003	Static-X	Shadow Zone
2003	Revis	Places for Breathing
2004	Seether	Disclaimer II
2004	The Dwarves	The Dwarves Must Die
2004	Static-X	Beneath... Between... Beyond...
2004	Tommy Stinson	Village Gorilla Head
2004	Kelly Clarkson	Breakaway
2004	The Martinis	Smitten
2004	Avril Lavigne	Under My Skin
2004	The Calling	Two
2004	Radford	Sleepwalker
2005	Sting	Live 8 Music Relief Concert DVD
2005	Courtney Jaye	Traveling Light
2005	Queens of the Stone Age	Lullabies to Paralyze (on the song "In My Head")
2005	Ween	Shinola, Vol. 1
2005	Unwritten Law	Here's to the Mourning
2005	The Veronicas	The Secret Life of...
2005	The Offspring	Greatest Hits (on the song "Can't Repeat")
2006	Viva Death	One Percent Panic
2006	Faulter	Darling Buds of May
2006	The Replacements	Don't You Know Who I Think I Was? (on two new recordings)
2006	The Summer Obsession	This Is Where You Belong
2006	Nina Gordon	Bleeding Heart Graffiti (on "Christmas Lights", "Suffragette", "Don't Let Me Down", "Pure", "Watercolors", "Turn On Your Radio")
2006	Anna Tsuchiya	Strip Me?
2006	Devo 2.0	Devo 2.0
2006	Rob Zombie	Educated Horses
2006	Jihad Jerry & the Evildoers	Mine Is Not A Holy War
2006	Daughtry	Daughtry
2006	Lostprophets	Liberation Transmission
2007	Elliott Yamin	Elliott Yamin (on "I'm the Man", "Take My Breath Away")
2007	Avril Lavigne	The Best Damn Thing
2007	Black Light Burns	Cruel Melody
2007	Nine Inch Nails	Beside You in Time
2007	Nine Inch Nails	Year Zero
2007	Fuel	Angels & Devils
2007	B'z	Eien no Tsubasa
2008	Miley Cyrus	Breakout
2008	Gavin Rossdale	Wanderlust
2008	Nine Inch Nails	The Slip
2008	Brian Head Welch	Save Me from Myself
2008	Ashes Divide	Keep Telling Myself It's Alright
2008	The Offspring	Rise and Fall, Rage and Grace
2008	Filter	Anthems for the Damned
2008	Guns N' Roses	Chinese Democracy (writing & arrangements only; Freese's drumming was re-recorded by a different drummer upon exiting the band)
2008	Hollywood Undead	Swan Songs
2008	Jubilee	"Rebel Hiss" (Single from forthcoming album)
2008	Katy Perry	One of the Boys
2009	Kelly Clarkson	All I Ever Wanted
2009	Filter	The Very Best Things (1995-2008)
2009	Selena Gomez	Kiss & Tell
2009	Orianthi	Believe
2009	Michael Bublé	Crazy Love
2009	Weezer	Raditude
2010	Slash	Slash
2010	Melissa Auf der Maur	Out of Our Minds
2010	Katy Perry	Teenage Dream
2010	Foxy Shazam	Foxy Shazam
2010	Devo	Something for Everybody
2010	Joe Cocker	Hard Knocks
2011	Social Distortion	Hard Times and Nursery Rhymes
2011	Ricky Martin	Música + alma + sexo
2011	Avril Lavigne	Goodbye Lullaby
2011	Kelly Clarkson	Stronger
2011	Michael Buble	Christmas
2012	The Offspring	Days Go By
2013	Ra Ra Riot	Beta Love
2013	Rob Zombie	Venomous Rat Regeneration Vendor
2013	Sons of the Sea	Compass EP & Sons of the Sea
2014	Bruce Springsteen	High Hopes
2014	Dwarves	The Dwarves Invented Rock & Roll
2014	Caleb Johnson	Testify
2015	Kazuya Yoshii	Chōzetsu Dynamic!
2016	Sting	57th & 9th
2018	John Sykes	Sy-Ops
2019	Sting	My Songs
2020	Paul Leary	Born Stupid
2021	The Offspring	Let the Bad Times Roll
2021	Samantha Fish	Faster
2021	Danny Elfman	Big Mess
2021	Sting	The Bridge
2023	100 gecs	10,000 Gecs
2023	Various artists	Barbie the Album
2024	The Offspring	Supercharged
