= Dudes (film) =

1987 American independent film

- Theatrical release poster
- Directed by: Penelope Spheeris
- Written by: Randall Jahnson
- Produced by: Herb Jaffe; Miguel Tejada-Flores
- Starring: Jon Cryer; Catherine Mary Stewart; Daniel Roebuck; Lee Ving
- Cinematography: Robert Richardson
- Edited by: Andy Horvitch
- Music by: Charles Bernstein
- Distributed by: The Vista Organization
- Release dates: September 18, 1987 (Toronto Film Festival); June 24, 1988
- Running time: 90 minutes
- Country: United States
- Language: English

Dudes is a 1987 American independent film directed by Penelope Spheeris, written by Randall Jahnson, and starring Jon Cryer, Catherine Mary Stewart, Daniel Roebuck, and Lee Ving. A Western revenge story in a contemporary setting, its plot concerns three punk rockers from New York City who attempt to make their way to California. When one of them is murdered by a vicious gang leader, the other two, played by Cryer and Roebuck, find themselves fish out of water as they pursue the murderer from Arizona to Montana, assisted by a tow truck driver played by Stewart.

Continuing Spheeris' theme of highlighting the punk subculture as in her prior films The Decline of Western Civilization (1981) and Suburbia (1984), Dudes features several rock musicians in various roles, including Fear singer Lee Ving as the gang leader, Red Hot Chili Peppers bassist Flea as the murdered punk, and John Densmore of the Doors, Axxel G. Reese of the Gears, and punk artist and promoter "Mad" Marc Rude in minor roles, as well as punk rock band the Vandals performing in the opening scene. Spheeris had previously worked with Ving in The Decline of Western Civilization, and with Flea and the Vandals in Suburbia.

Dudes was shown in only a few theaters and did not receive a wide release through a film distributor. Several parties involved in making the film, including Spheeris, later attributed this to its mixing of multiple genres and tones. Written as a dramatic, action-filled "punk Western" set in the modern era, the finished film also contained elements of comedy, road movies, and a heavy metal soundtrack, the combination of which made it difficult to market. It received a home video release on VHS, through which niche interest in the film persisted in subsequent decades. In 2017 it was given a new release in the DVD and Blu-ray formats.

== Plot ==
Grant, Biscuit, and Milo are punks living in Queens. Bored with their lives, they decide to move to Los Angeles, and set out on a cross-country drive. In Utah they assist Elvis impersonator "Daredelvis" with getting his trailer unstuck. Later, Grant sees a mirage of a cowboy on horseback. While camping in the Arizona desert they are attacked by a gang of vicious rednecks, and Milo is murdered by their leader, Missoula. Grant and Biscuit escape and collapse in the desert, where Grant again sees a vision of the cowboy.

The local sheriffs do not believe the boys' story, having no record of Missoula or his gang and being unable to find Milo's body as evidence of the murder. Grant resolves to track down the gang and avenge Milo's death, despite Biscuit's reservations. Heading back into Utah, they find one of the gang's trucks overturned and several of the members dead. Before dying, one of them reveals that they planned to turn themselves in but were killed by Missoula, who is headed north through Wyoming to Montana. The boys also meet Jessie, a young woman who runs a gas station and towing business.

Catching up to Missoula's truck, Grant and Biscuit engage in a high-speed shootout with Missoula and his buddy Blix, but swerve off the road and crash. They are rescued by Jessie, who teaches Grant how to shoot and ride a horse and strikes up a romance with him. Meanwhile, Biscuit has a dream in which he is part of a Native American tribe who are slaughtered by Union Army soldiers led by Missoula. Upon awakening, he begins to imitate a Native American warrior and insists on resuming the pursuit. Jesse outfits the pair in exaggerated western costumes and gives them use of a beat-up 1959 Buick Invicta complete with bull's horns mounted to the hood.

In Wyoming, the boys find Daredelvis working at a rodeo and enlist his help to capture gang member Wes, from whom they recover Milo's stolen jacket, but Wes is killed by a bull without revealing Missoula's location. On the way to a ghost town where Missoula is rumored to be hiding, Grant once again sees the mysterious cowboy, but Biscuit dismisses it as an illusion. Finding the town empty, the pair get drunk and have a vision in which they meet the cowboy, named Witherspoon, accompanied by a trio of Native American warriors from Biscuit's dream. Witherspoon magically transports Grant back in time to when the town was populated and raucous, while the Native Americans similarly transport Biscuit back in time to participate in a tribal gathering.

Awakening hung over, Grant finds a matchbook in Milo's jacket that leads them to a saloon in a Montana town where they find Missoula and Blix. Trailing them into a movie theater, Grant and Biscuit open fire on the pair, but Grant hesitates and a shootout ensues; Missoula and Blix escape, while Grant and Biscuit are arrested and jailed. Missoula and Blix murder two sheriff's department officers and invade the jail in an attempt to kill the boys, but Jessie arrives just in time to break them out. Grant manages to kill Blix and wound Missoula, and pursues him on horseback to an abandoned building, where he tackles Missoula off a high ledge. Missoula shoots Grant in the arm and Grant returns fire, killing him. Grant once again sees Witherspoon and the Native American warriors, now accompanied by Milo, who ride off into the distance and disappear in a cloud of dust just before Biscuit and Jessie arrive.

== Cast ==
Adapted from the film's credits reel.

- Jon Cryer as Grant
- Daniel Roebuck as Biscuit
- Flea as Milo
- Lee Ving as Missoula
- Billy Ray Sharkey as Blix
- Glenn Withrow as Wes
- Michael Melvin as Logan, one of the gang members
- Axxel G. Reese as Red, one of the gang members
- Marc Rude as Sonny, one of the gang members
- Catherine Mary Stewart as Jessie
- Calvin Bartlett as Witherspoon
- Pete Willcox as Daredelvis
- Vance Colvig as Hezekiah, a prisoner in the Montana jail
- Ancel Cook as Rhatigan, one of the Arizona sheriffs
- Wycliff Young as Watts, one of the Arizona sheriffs
- Arleigh Bonnaha as Fights at Dawn, one of the Native American warriors
- Apesanahkwat as Skytalks, one of the Native American warriors
- Red Wing as Laughing Bear, one of the Native American warriors
- Christina Beck as the woman accompanying Missoula in the saloon and movie theater
- Molly Matthiesen as the woman accompanying Blix in the saloon and movie theater
- Read Morgan as Stoddard, one of the Montana sheriffs
- John Densmore as Beeson, one of the Montana sheriffs
- Pamela Gidley as Elyse, a woman who flirts with Grant in a restaurant
- Peter Kent as Elyse's boyfriend "Road Warrior", who starts a fight with Grant
- Leland Sun as the restaurant waiter
- Tiny Wells as McGrorty
- James Helpi as a skinhead
- Blessing McAnlis as Jennifer, a young girl who gives Grant and Biscuit information about the gang
- David K. Wolf as Ray Kellog, a scout leader who refuses to help Grant and Biscuit
- Judy Starr as Nancy Kellog, Ray's wife and fellow scout leader
- Marcia Darroch as the movie theater concessionaire
- Punk rock band the Vandals—consisting of singer Dave Quackenbush, drummer Joe Escalante, guitarist Jan Sakert, and bassist Chalmer Lumary—appear as themselves in the film's opening scene, performing their song "Urban Struggle".

== Production ==
=== Development ===
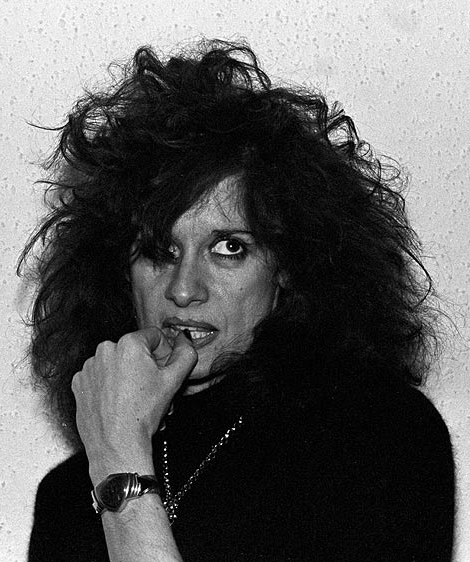
Director Penelope Spheeris in 1984

In writing Dudes, scriptwriter Randall Jahnson was partly inspired by visits to Old West locations which he felt were "frozen in time". In the early and mid-1980s, he later reflected, the punk and art rock scenes in Los Angeles were demonstrating a certain fascination with the West, exemplified by Wall of Voodoo performing cover versions of Spaghetti Western songs, the Dead Kennedys covering "Rawhide", and the Meat Puppets mixing punk with country music, which influenced his crossing of the two genres in his script. He settled on the film's title based on the Old West use of the term "dude" to describe a "tenderfoot" or "fish out of water", city-dwelling Easterners unprepared for life on the frontier, seeing his main characters as modern "dudes".

Jahnson pitched his script to producer Miguel Tejada-Flores of independent film company the Vista Organization as "punk rockers out in the wilds of Wyoming", which Tejada-Flores thought was an interesting idea, though a bit "out there" conceptually. He and fellow producer Herb Jaffe sought Ridley Scott to direct, but could not agree with him on the film's "vision". Penelope Spheeris first read the script in March 1986 and expressed interest. Tejada-Flores had been impressed by her previous directorial work, particularly her 1985 film The Boys Next Door, and felt that she could tell an enthralling story from the mix of genres present in Jahnson's script. He showed The Boys Next Door to Jaffe, and the two agreed that Spheeris was a good candidate to direct, a choice which was solidified when she convinced them that she could make the film within their proposed budget and get good performances out of her actors. Jahnson was a fan of Spheeris' 1981 punk rock documentary The Decline of Western Civilization, and agreed that she had the "punk rock sensibility" for the script.

Cinematographer Robert Richardson, who had recently finished working on Platoon (1986), personally approached Spheeris and expressed interest in working with her. Tejada-Flores and Jaffe had been impressed by Richardson's prior work, but did not think they could afford him; however, Richardson agreed to work within their cinematography budget.

=== Casting ===
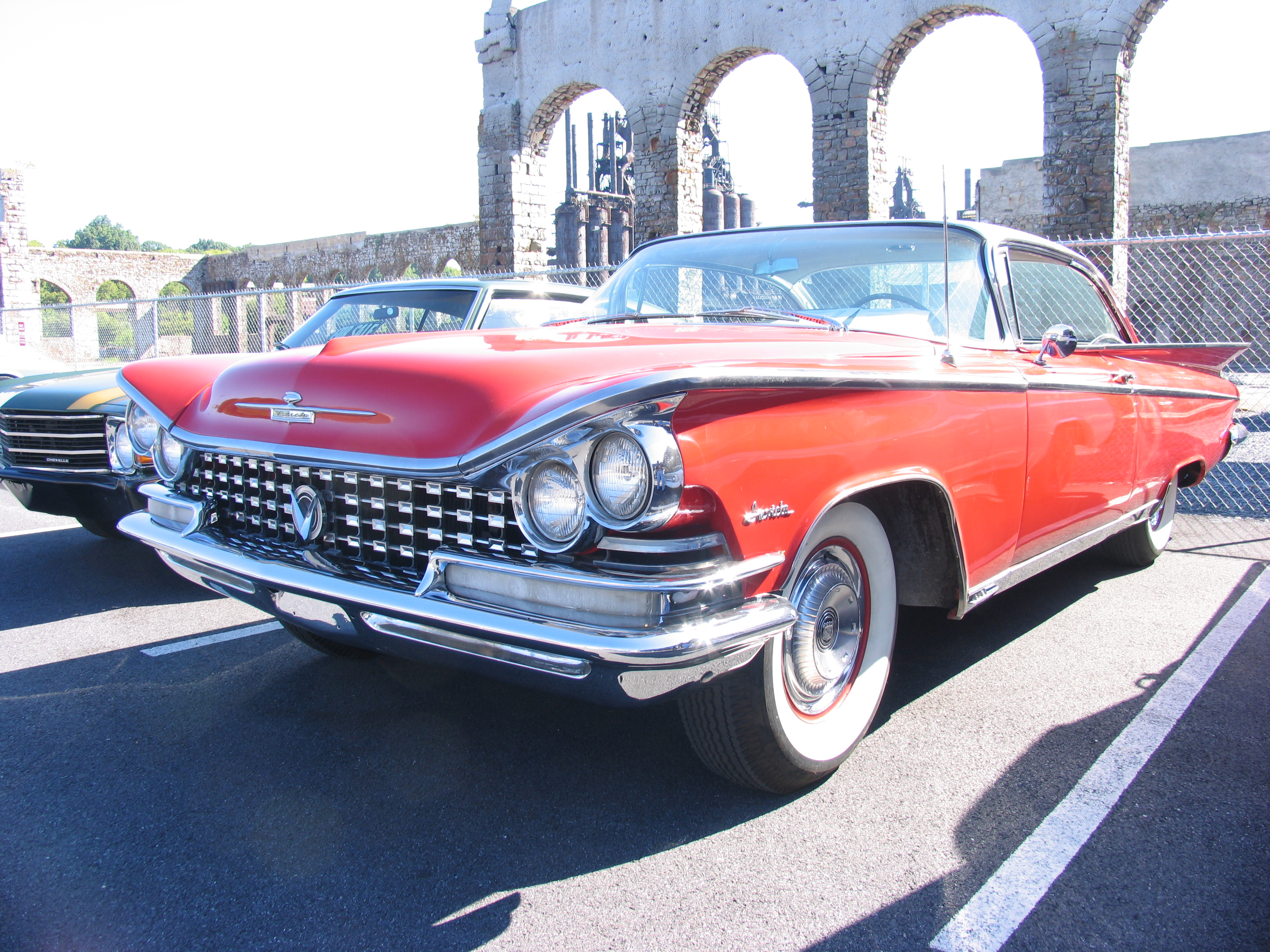
A 1959 Buick Invicta similar to the one used in Dudes. Cryer had very little driving experience, and had difficulty driving the full-size car.

Spheeris wanted Jahnson to be part of the casting process, and invited him to many of the casting sessions, which was not common practice for directors. Jon Cryer, who had recently gained attention for his role in the hit film Pretty in Pink, was attracted to the eclectic nature of Dudes' script as well as the opportunity to play the hero, which he had not done before. Spheeris favored Cryer for the film's lead but also considered Keanu Reeves, and chose Cryer at Jaffe's suggestion. To prepare for the role Cryer learned how to ride a horse and fire a gun, and got his ear pierced since the script called for Grant to wear an earring; the heavy earring caused the piercing to become infected. Being young and eager to play the hero, he performed many of his own stunts. He had difficulty with the scenes that required him to drive a car; He had earned his driver's license while performing in Torch Song Trilogy in Los Angeles several years prior, but used public transport and taxis in his native New York City and had very little experience behind the wheel.

Catherine Mary Stewart became interested in the role of Jessie because "she was a strong female character, which is important, and also was somebody who could ride horses, shoot a gun, she owned a garage...Part of my fantasy when I was a little girl was to do exactly all that stuff, and when I came on the set I had an idea of what my character should be and what I sort of developed for myself, and [Spheeris] was very supportive of that." In preparation for the role she trained with a stunt performer who specialized in gun play, learning how to twirl her revolver so it would slide right into its holster. "I was practicing that all the time," she later recalled, "because I wanted it to be great."

Daniel Roebuck, a character actor who had recently finished filming River's Edge, was reading scripts in search of new roles and was struck by the uniqueness of Dudes. "It was not a John Hughes movie", he said in 2015. "There was nothing like it. When I read it all I thought of was 'I want to be in a Western.' I was a little concerned about the punk rock stuff, but I really liked the Western stuff." For his audition in front of Spheeris he wore a mohawk hairstyle, since that was what the script called for his character, Biscuit, to have. When given the part, he had to have the sides of his head shaved and his hair tied into place for the duration of filming since it was too time-consuming to take apart and re-tie the mohawk for each shoot. Roebuck was not into punk rock, however, describing himself as a "square", and was so embarrassed to wear his hair in a mohawk every day that he convinced the crew to get him a wig to wear on days off from shooting.

Spheeris had featured Lee Ving's band Fear in The Decline of Western Civilization (1981), and stayed in touch with him. It was through Ving that she met Flea, who had joined Fear in 1982 as the band's bassist. Thinking he had a star quality, she cast him as one of the runaway punks in her 1984 film Suburbia. By 1986 Flea was active in the Red Hot Chili Peppers, and Spheeris reached out to him to be in Dudes, later saying that he brought to the role "a certain vulnerability and a certain sweetness that actually wasn't written into the script, and played it in such a sweet, loving way that when the moment came that [his character is] killed in the movie, it was more powerful, because [he was] so lovable before that, and people don't expect that moment." Flea felt honored to be cast, since Dudes was a chance to work alongside trained actors whereas in Suburbia he had been among a group of "street kids" similar to himself, all without acting experience.

Another musician cast in Dudes, though in a minor role, was John Densmore, former drummer of the Doors. Jahnson met with the surviving members of the Doors while working on his script for The Doors (1991), a biographical film about the band; Densmore had moved into acting, knew Spheeris, and had heard about Dudes, and asked Jahnson if there might be a part for him in it. Jahnson spoke with Spheeris, and Densmore was cast as one of the Montana sheriffs who is murdered by Missoula late in the film.

=== Filming ===
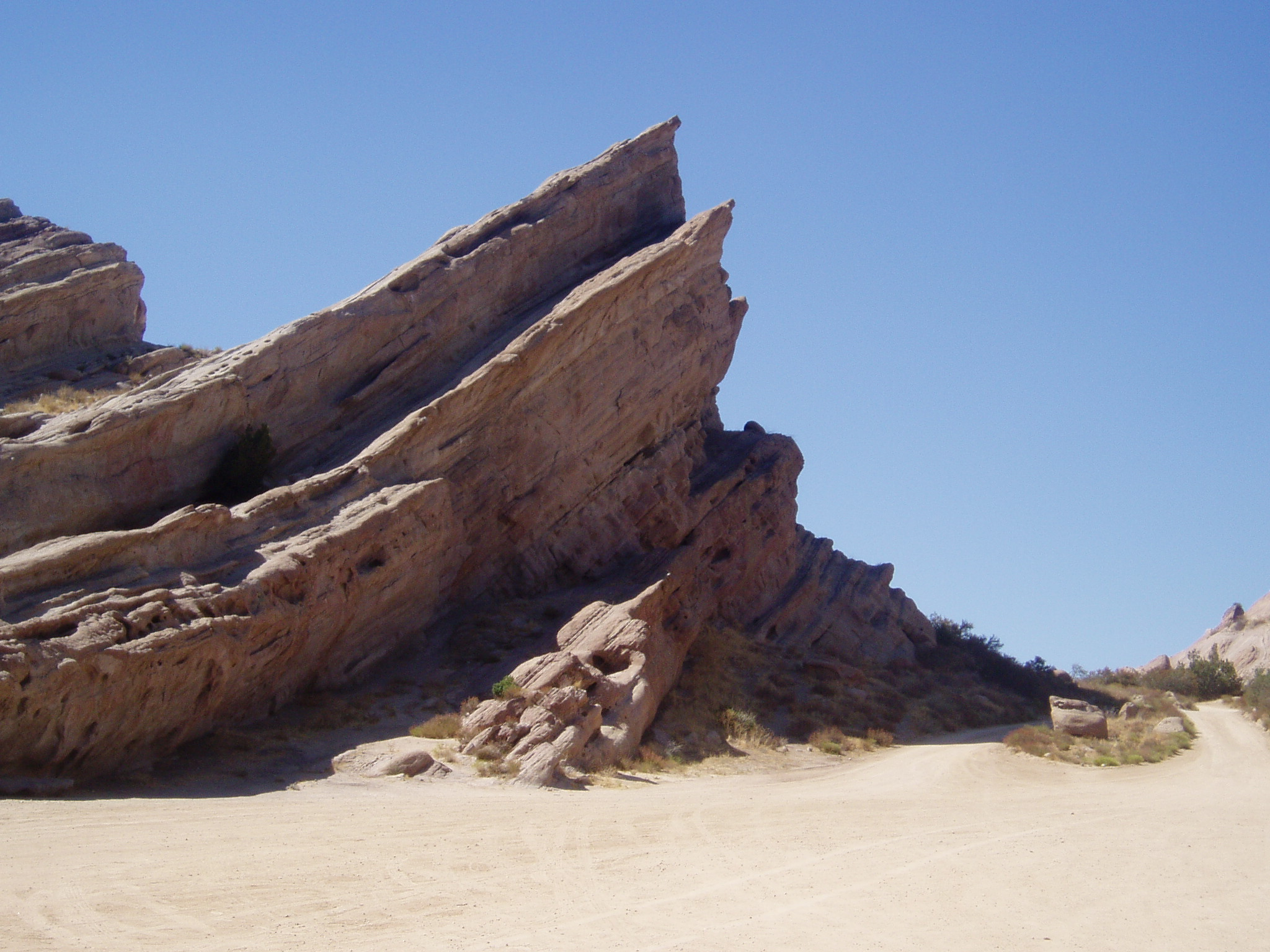
The gang attack scene was filmed at the Vasquez Rocks.

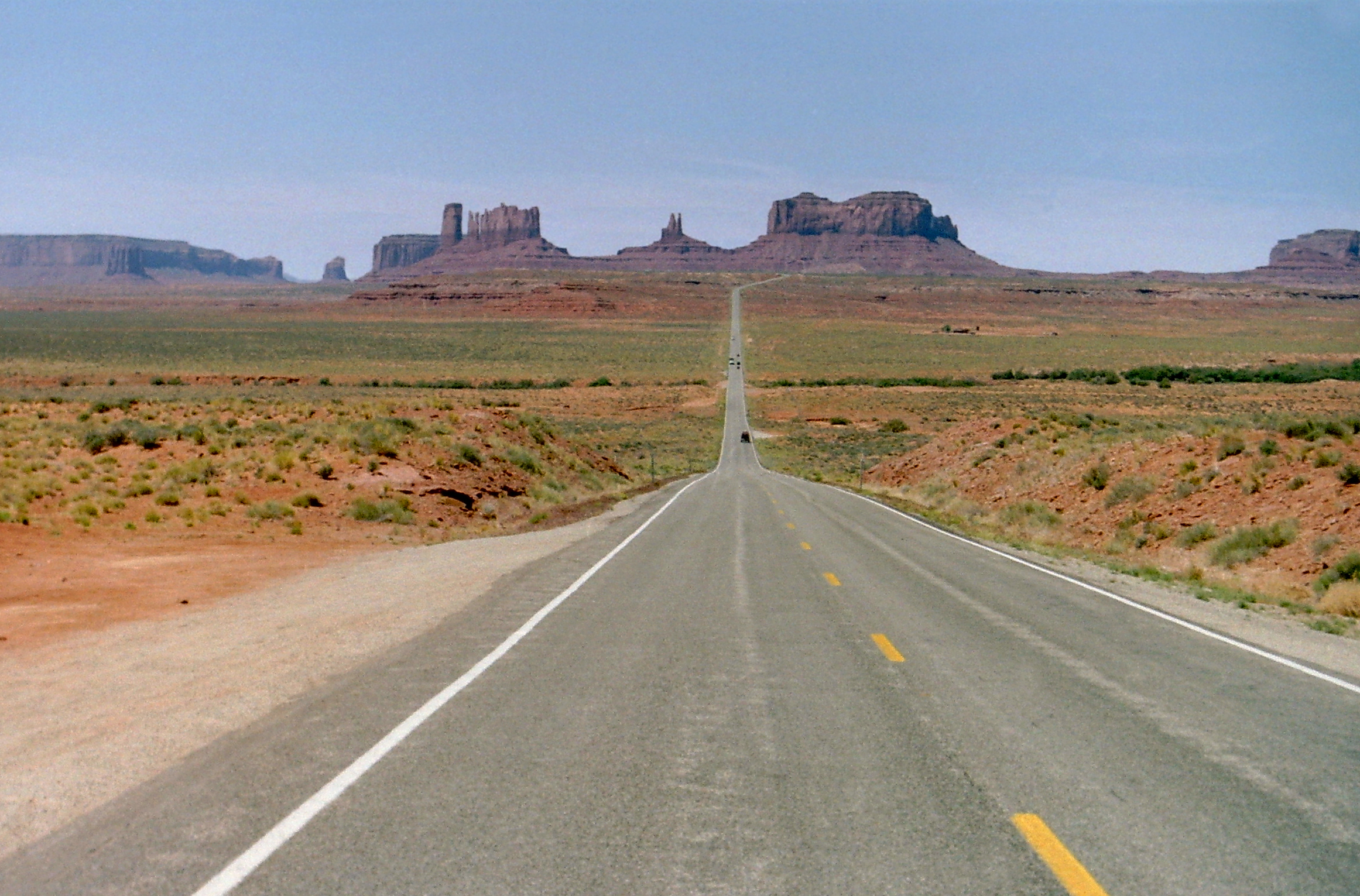
Scenes of the boys driving through the desert were filmed along U.S. Route 163 in Monument Valley.

Principal photography for Dudes began on August 14, 1986. The early scenes set in Queens were filmed in Hollywood, with establishing shots of the New York skyline and other buildings edited in to create the illusion of being in New York City. The opening scene, a punk rock show with the Vandals performing their song "Urban Struggle" (with its opening lyric "I want to be a cowboy"), was the first to be filmed. Cryer and Roebuck both had musical theatre backgrounds and were not very familiar with punk rock, and neither had been in a mosh pit before. Cryer later remarked that he found it to be rough, but fun and less violent than he had expected. Roebuck, however, recalled that he and Cryer were being trounced by the extras, who were actual punks, and that first assistant director Guy Louthan's plea to the crowd to "not hurt the real actors" only caused them to be targeted more. Stunt doubles were used for some of the action, and the one standing in for Roebuck punched one of the punks squarely in the face. Flea, who had been to many punk rock shows, had no problem filming the scene: "That was very controlled in comparison to, like, a Black Flag show at the Starwood where people are getting sent out to ambulances all the time, and getting their heads really stomped in for having the wrong hair and shit...so I felt comfortable and fun in that environment", he recalled 30 years later. A scene in which Grant, Biscuit, and Milo nearly fall off of a fire escape was shot in downtown Los Angeles with the actors at ground level, then edited together with shots of stuntmen dangling from a higher level. A scene in which Grant flirts with a woman played by Pamela Gidley and gets into a brawl with her boyfriend was filmed at popular punk hangout the Atomic Cafe.

Production then moved east, outside of Los Angeles. The redneck attack and Milo's murder, set in Arizona, were filmed in Agua Dulce, California at the Vasquez Rocks. The rodeo scene, set in the fictional town of Peckerville, Wyoming, was filmed in Agua Dulce as well. Some of the desert scenes were filmed in the Four Corners region, including Monument Valley on the Arizona-Utah border; filming in this region was delayed by inclement weather including dust storms and rain. Filming in Arizona lasted four weeks, with additional location filming taking place in New Mexico and Utah. For one of the driving scenes, Spheeris suggested that Cryer, Roebuck, and Flea sing "Hava Nagila" while headbanging to show that their characters were enjoying their road trip; this inspired a scene in Spheeris' later hit comedy Wayne's World (1992) in which the main characters sing along to "Bohemian Rhapsody" while driving and launch into headbanging.

Catherine Mary Stewart joined the crew midway through filming to perform her scenes, including the jailbreak scene set in the fictional town of Crossfire, Montana, which was filmed in Cottonwood, Arizona. She had a lifelong passion for horses and was an experienced rider, so enjoyed filming the horseback riding segments, but suffered a broken ulna when she stopped her horse abruptly to avoid hitting a parked vehicle and was thrown into the vehicle herself. This occurred toward the end of filming her scenes, so it did not significantly impact the shooting schedule.

While filming the climactic showdown between Grant and Missoula, Ving heard that there was asbestos in the building being used and refused to re-enter it, so the sequence had to be rewritten and edited to show less of his character. Spheeris liked Flea's performance so much that he was asked to return to filming so that his character could appear in the final scene, which had not been in the original script.

== Music ==
Kathy Nelson, who worked at MCA Records, served as a music editor on Dudes and brought in several artists to appear on the film's soundtrack. At the time, the Los Angeles punk rock scene was giving way to heavy metal; Spheeris liked both genres, and worked them both into the soundtrack, although she later thought this caused confusion regarding the tone of the film. Her next film, The Decline of Western Civilization Part II: The Metal Years (1988), would document this new heavy metal scene.

=== Soundtrack album ===
Dudes: The Original Motion Picture Soundtrack Album

Soundtrack album
- Released: 1987
- Genre: Punk rock, heavy metal
- Length: 38:35
- Label: MCA
- Producer: Stephen E. Smith

MCA records released the soundtrack album for Dudes, which featured several artists from the Los Angeles area including an early version of "Mountain Song" by Jane's Addiction and a new recording of Megadeth's cover version of "These Boots Are Made for Walkin'" (their original recording of the song had been released on their 1985 album Killing Is My Business... and Business Is Good!). The Vandals contributed a new recording of "Urban Struggle", which had been an early hit for the band. Only guitarist Jan Sakert and drummer Joe Escalante remained from the lineup that had recorded the original version, released on Peace thru Vandalism (1982); the Dudes recording featured new singer Dave Quackenbush and bassist Chalmer Lumary. In a retrospective review, Jon Bush of Allmusic rated the soundtrack album 3 stars out of 5 and pointed to the Megadeth track and Steve Vai's version of "Amazing Grace" as highlights.

Writing credits adapted from the film's credits reel.

No.	Title	Writer(s)	Performer	Length
1.	"Rock 'n' Roll Outlaw" (originally performed by Rose Tattoo)	Angry Anderson, Mick Cocks, Peter Wells	Keel	3:24
2.	"Urban Struggle" (1987 recording)	Jan Sakert, Steven Ronald Jensen	The Vandals	5:24
3.	"Show No Mercy" (from "Animal (Fuck Like a Beast)", 1984)	Blackie Lawless	W.A.S.P.	3:40
4.	"Vengeance Is Mine"	Simon Steele	Simon Steele and the Claw	3:32
5.	"These Boots Were Made for Walkin'" (originally performed by Nancy Sinatra)	Lee Hazlewood	Megadeth	4:05
6.	"Time Forgot You"	Kat Arthur, Brian Hansen	Legal Weapon	4:40
7.	"Jesus Came Driving Along" (from Lust Games, 1986)	Bengt Aronsson	Leather Nun	3:13
8.	"Mountain Song" (1986 recording)	Perry Farrell, Eric Avery	Jane's Addiction	4:10
9.	"Lost Highway"	John Thum	Little Kings	2:59
10.	"Dudes Showdown"	Charles Bernstein	Charles Bernstein & Co.	2:17
11.	"Amazing Grace" (traditional)	John Newton	Steve Vai	1:11
Total length:				38:35

Additional songs used in the film but not included on the soundtrack album include "Bathroom Wall" by Faster Pussycat, "Dirty Pool" and "Dead Dog Man" by the Little Kings (a group featuring Gore Verbinski), "Guitarget" by Four Big Guitars from Texas, "Yard Dog" and "Rock 'n' Roll Till the Cows Come Home" by the Tail Gators, "Waltz Across Texas" by Ernest Tubb, "Cocaine & Whiskey" by Ned Sublette, a rendition of "Blue Suede Shoes" performed by Robert Gordon and Chris Spedding, and renditions of "If You Love Somebody Set Them Free" and "Mexican Radio" performed by Vance Colvig.

== Release ==
Dudes was initially scheduled for theatrical release in April 1987, but this date was pushed back multiple times. It was screened at the 1987 Toronto International Film Festival that September. The Vista Organization struggled to find a film distributor willing to give the film a wide theatrical release. "We were a small indie company," reflected Tejada-Flores 30 years later, "we had money to make indie films, and we co-financed a distribution company, but we didn't have the clout and the budget that the bigger distribution companies had", feeling that the larger distributors viewed Dudes as too strange, and too dissimilar to mainstream films, to pick up:

We wound up with a movie that was both true to and exceeded the multiple genres of the script, and the script wasn't one thing or another. It's a punk rock Western; well, what does that mean? It's a modern Western; what does that mean? It also has supernatural elements, but it's got punk rock, it's got a bunch of rock and roll, it's got a human story, it's got comedy, it's got romance...so which one do we sell it as?

Spheeris felt similarly upon reflection, saying that "when we were looking to get it released, the distributors just didn't get it. You know, punk rock was born in the late '70s, and then by the time we got to '86 and '7 it was still around, but I started integrating some metal in [the film], you know. So the distributors, they still didn't know about punk rock. They were like "Punk rock? Oh, no...Heavy metal? No, no." So we had two strikes right there." Flea agreed with this: "It has punk rock it in it, it has the Vandals, but it's not a punk rock movie. And then it has this sort of Western thing, this cowboy thing, but it's not a Western movie. And it has kind of a metal element too, but it's not a metal movie. Culturally, it doesn't really sit in a perfect place for people to pigeonhole." Although Jahnson's script was written as a dramatic, action-filled "punk western" and not a comedy film, Spheeris felt that her comedic instincts, as well as Cryer's, influenced the tone of the finished film. Cryer later viewed Dudes as a bridge between Spheeris' prior dramatic films Suburbia (1984) and The Boys Next Door (1985) and her later success with the hit comedy Wayne's World (1992).

Dudes ultimately received only a limited release in a few theaters, opening in New York on June 24, 1988, and in Los Angeles a week later. The New York Times film critic Janet Maslin gave it a middling review, saying that it "has a more commercial tone than some of Miss Spheeris' earlier films, which is to say it's filled with scenic, largely unmotivated events and lacks conviction. Tongue-tied dialogue ('This country, man - it's like a Road Runner cartoon. Beep, beep!') is another problem. Still, there are enough eccentric touches to hold the interest, like the exuberantly vicious Mr. Ving in his villain's role, and the character calling himself Daredelvis (Pete Willcox), who has somehow worked a lot of Presley mannerisms into his act as a rodeo clown." She felt that Cryer and Roebuck "have a wholesomeness that doesn't entirely suit their characters", but praised Lee Ving's performance, saying "Mr. Ving was made for villainy, and he's at least as well suited to bad-guy acting roles as he is to punk posturing." Critic Michael Wilmington also gave the film a mixed review in the Los Angeles Times, calling it "an entertaining movie from a bad script." He criticized Jahnson's script as "one more out of the VCR cookie-cutter: a revenge Western in the old Henry King-Henry Hathaway mold" and for being "stripped to minimal, car-chase, '80s limits and spiced up with slapstick and an allegedly colorful subculture—which isn't very well portrayed", but complimented the cinematography and directing, saying "the deep-focus, scorching cinematography of Robert Richardson (Platoon) is more than movies like this usually give you. Director Penelope Spheeris handles the material with relish. Spheeris has an eye and a sense of humor, and she keeps everything overripe and zingy. She's also cast interesting actors who keep going pleasantly over the top, as in a good Abbott and Costello movie", singling out Ving and Roebuck's performances as examples.

== Home media ==
In October 1987, Heron Communications filed a lawsuit against the Vista Organization regarding home video rights to Dudes and nine other Vista-produced films, claiming that Vista was attempting to renege on its commitment to license home video distribution of its films to Heron due to a possible merger with Carolco Pictures. Vista claimed that it had no such arrangement with Heron. Dudes was eventually released to home video in VHS format in 1991 by Avid Home Entertainment, a division of Artisan Entertainment. It was on VHS that, like The Decline of Western Civilization, Suburbia, and The Boys Next Door, Dudes found a niche audience in subsequent decades.

Reviewing the film from a VHS copy in 2005, film critic Emanuel Levy rated it a 2 out of a possible 5. Writing for Not Coming to a Theater Near You in 2011, Victoria Large called it "something of a bridge between the cult, punk films that started [Spheeris'] career and the slick Hollywood comedies that the director is perhaps more widely associated with. And while it's true that melding the spiky strangeness of Suburbia with the agreeable silliness of Wayne's World makes for an uneven viewing experience, Dudes is also a fun watch." Placing it in the "punk western" subgenre alongside other 1987 films Straight to Hell and Border Radio, she remarked that Dudes is "most memorable for its loopy flourishes" and "at its most self-conscious when it comes to its co-option of western tropes", concluding that "while Dudes takes pains to reclaim the western for its spiky-haired leads, therefore placing it in conversation with past westerns and with other countercultural films [...] I'm not sure that it adds that much to the discussion, or even that it means to. But its utter weirdness is a virtue, and there's a playfulness here that charms." In 2015, critic Dennis Schwartz gave the film a B− rating, calling it an "off-beat road adventure comedy" that "has some Easy Rider vibes going for it", concluding that "the violent clash between cultures makes for absurdist adolescent drama, but it's weirdly entertaining."

In 2017, Dudes was released on DVD and Blu-ray by Shout! Factory under their Shout Select imprint, the original film print given a 2K resolution transfer to the more modern digital formats. As added features for this 30th anniversary release, Spheeris conducted interviews with Cryer, Roebuck, and Flea reflecting on the making of the film. Separate interviews with Stewart and with Jahnson and Tejada-Flores were also included. During the lead-up to the release, Spheeris' alma mater UCLA hosted a screening of Dudes at the Hammer Museum in January 2016 with Spheeris, Jahnson, Cryer, Roebuck, Stewart, and Pete Willcox (who played Daredelvis) in attendance, as part of a two-night tribute to the director. Spheeris also hosted a screening of the film at the Laughlin International Film Festival in October 2017, at which she was presented a Lifetime Achievement award for her film work.
