= Shingo Japanese Remix Album =

Remix album by The Vandals
- Released: 8 November 2005
- Genre: Punk rock; comedy rock
- Length: 48:11
- Label: Kung Fu
- Producer: Shingo Asari

The Vandals chronology
Hollywood Potato Chip (2004)	Shingo Japanese Remix Album (2005)	BBC Sessions and Other Polished Turds (2008)

Professional ratings
Review scores
Source	Rating
Allmusic	2.5/5 stars

Shingo Japanese Remix Album is an album of songs by the southern California punk rock band The Vandals remixed and re-interpreted by Japanese DJ Shingo Asari, released in 2005 by Kung Fu Records. Asari had been tinkering with Vandals songs for several years and had sent several of his remixes to Kung Fu, who had posted them on their website for Vandals fans to download. The band was impressed by his takes on their songs and used a remixed medley he had made of many of their most popular songs as an introduction to their live shows. Finally in 2005 Shingo was given license to remix several newer Vandals songs and to release them as an album through Kung Fu.

All of the songs presented are remixes of songs from the Vandals' two most recent albums, Internet Dating Superstuds and Hollywood Potato Chip. However, "hidden" at the end of the album is an unlisted track which is a remixed medley of many of the band's most popular songs from the 1990s.

== Track listing ==
No.	Title	Writer(s)	Length
1.	"How They Getcha'" (Gold mix)	Warren Fitzgerald
2.	"43210-1" (00223 mix)	Fitzgerald
3.	"Appreciate My Honesty" (MC Freshman mix)	Fitzgerald
4.	"Be a Good Robot" (Rhythm Rovo mix)	Fitzgerald
5.	"Disproportioned Head" (Bistrot 2000 mix)	Fitzgerald
6.	"Little Weirdo" (Shuttle 9 mix)	Fitzgerald
7.	"When I Say You I Mean Me" (Clockworked mix)	Dave Quackenbush
8.	"The Unseen Tears of the Albacore" (Last mix)	Joe Escalante, Fitzgerald
9.	"I'm Becoming You" (CJB mix)	Fitzgerald
10.	"My Neck, My Back" (Ikioi mix)	Fitzgerald
11.	"Lord of the Dance" (Do Da Swing! mix)	Fitzgerald
Total length:			48:11

== Personnel ==
- Dave Quackenbush – vocals
- Warren Fitzgerald – guitar, backing vocals
- Joe Escalante – bass, backing vocals
- Josh Freese – drums
- Shingo Asari – DJ, remixing

== Album information ==
- Record label: Kung Fu Records
- All songs remixed and produced by Shingo Asari
- Original songs produced by Warren Fitzgerald
- Mastered by Jon St. James
- All songs copyright 2005 by Puppety Frenchman Music, SEAC
- Art direction and illustrations by Tony Vitali
