= Suburbia (film) =

1983 film by Penelope Spheeris

- Theatrical release poster
- Directed by: Penelope Spheeris
- Written by: Penelope Spheeris
- Produced by: Bert Dragin; Roger Corman
- Starring: Chris Pedersen; Bill Coyne; Jennifer Clay; Andrew Pece
- Cinematography: Timothy Suhrstedt
- Edited by: Ross Albert
- Music by: Alex Gibson
- Production company: Suburbia Productions
- Distributed by: New World Pictures
- Release date: July 22, 1983
- Running time: 94 minutes
- Country: United States
- Language: English
- Budget: $500,000

Suburbia (also known as Rebel Streets and The Wild Side) is a 1983 American coming-of-age thriller drama film written and directed by Penelope Spheeris and produced by Roger Corman. The film's plot concerns a group of suburban youths who run away from home and adopt a punk lifestyle by squatting in abandoned suburban tract homes. The punks are played by Chris Pedersen, Bill Coyne, Timothy Eric O'Brien, Red Hot Chili Peppers bassist Flea and others.

The film contains live footage of D.I. performing "Richard Hung Himself", T.S.O.L. performing "Wash Away" and "Darker My Love" and the Vandals performing "The Legend of Pat Brown".

The film inspired the 1986 Pet Shop Boys song of the same name.

== Plot ==
Sheila, a hitchhiking teenage runaway, is picked up on Interstate 605 in the Greater Los Angeles Area by a woman with a toddler. When the car gets a flat tire, they find a telephone booth on the edge of an abandoned tract housing district. While the mother is on the phone, the toddler is attacked and killed by a stray dog.

Another teenage runaway, Evan Johnson, leaves his suburban home and abusive, alcoholic mother, ending up at a punk rock concert by D.I., where Keef slips drugs into his drink. The concert ends abruptly when a female attendee has her clothes torn off by the punks in the audience. Jack Diddley offers Evan a place to stay at "T.R. House", a punk house in the abandoned tract housing district off Interstate 605. Along the way, they pick up Joe Schmo, who also intends to move into the house. Joe changes his mind when he learns each resident must be branded with the letters T.R. ("The Rejected"), but winds up coming back and accepting the brand.

The next morning, several men from "Citizens Against Crime", including Jim Tripplett and Bob Skokes, kill local stray dogs in a drive-by shooting. T.R. kids Razzle and Skinner confront them, but the situation is defused by Jack's stepfather, police Officer Bill Rennard. Jack, Evan, and Skinner steal food for the house by raiding the garages of a nearby suburban neighborhood, and they make further enemies of Jim and Bob by disrupting their garage sale. When Evan sees on the news that his mother has been arrested for drunk driving, he collects his younger brother, Ethan, and brings him to live at T.R. House, where he is given a mohawk by Sheila, who has also moved into the house. Joe forms a romantic relationship with Sheila, who admits to him that she was physically and sexually abused by her father.

During a T.S.O.L. concert, the T.R. gang get into a fight defending Skinner. The men (possibly Citizens Against Crime members) with whom they were fighting enter the concert and stab a security guard, framing the T.R. kids for the crime by using the knife to hang a flier with "T.R." written in blood. Jim and Bob are next told of the T.R. crew vandalizing a convenience store. At a Citizens Against Crime meeting, they accuse Bill and the rest of the police of not doing enough to curb the teenagers' criminal behavior, declaring their willingness to take the law into their own hands. Bill goes to T.R. House and implores the teens to stay out of trouble. That night, Jim and Bob invade the house and threaten the teens, assaulting Sheila in the process. The next morning, the kids find that Sheila has killed herself by overdosing on Keef's drugs. Not knowing what to do, they bring her body back to her parents. When the T.R. kids come to the funeral, Sheila's father insists that they leave. Joe reveals his knowledge of Sheila's abuse, and a fight breaks out, hospitalizing Sheila's father.

At a Vandals concert that night, Bill shows up and warns the T.R. kids to clear out of T.R. house immediately, before their actions bring Citizens Against Crime down on their heads, but they decide to stay. Learning of the violence at the funeral, Jim and Bob show up at the house and are attacked by the teens, who drive them off. They bring their car back around for another pass, accidentally running over and killing Ethan. Bill arrives, but is too late to prevent the tragedy (although Jim and Bob will likely be either arrested or charged).

== Cast ==
- Bill Coyne as Evan Johnson
- Chris Pedersen as Jack Diddley
- Jennifer Clay as Sheila
- Timothy Eric O'Brien as Skinner
- Wade Walston as Joe Schmo
- Mike B. the Flea as Razzle
- André Boutilier as Peg Leg
- Grant Miner as Keef
- Christina Beck as T'resa
- Maggie Ehrig as Mattie
- Lee Frederick (credited as Robert Peyton) as Jim Tripplett
- Jeff Prettyman as Bob Skokes
- Don Allen as Officer Bill Rennard
- Andrew Pece as Ethan Johnson
- J. Dinan Myrtetus as Sheila's father
- Ilene Latter as Sheila's mother
- Donna Lamana as Tina Johnson
- Gavin Courtney as Joe's father
- Gina Carrera (credited as Julie Winchester) as Sandy Dawson
- Marlena Brause as Mrs. Tripplett
- Dorlinda Griffin as Mother
- Robert Griffin as Toddler

Cameos

- D.I. (Casey Royer, Fredric Taccone, Tim Maag, Derek O'Brien)
- T.S.O.L. (Jack Grisham, Ron Emory, Mike Roche, Todd Barnes, Greg Kuehn)
- The Vandals (Stevo, Jan Ackerman, Joseph Escalante, Steve Pfauter)

== Production ==
Director Penelope Spheeris was inspired to write and direct the film when seeing a lack of release for her punk documentary The Decline of Western Civilization (1981). As such, owing to her time spent around the scene, she took inspiration from stories and incidents she had seen or heard when writing the script, whether that was stray dogs that actually were roaming streets owing to a guard dog training school being closed down to let the dogs run wild. She recruited street youths and punk-rock musicians to play each role rather than hiring actors.

Spheeris said she provided $250,000 of the budget and Roger Corman the other $250,000. She said, "Roger made biker movies and exploitation movies and that sort of thing, so luckily he wanted to do the movie because he felt this might be the new wave. But, you know, he didn't really interfere too much. It was mostly that he wanted me to have that scene up front where the kid gets nuked by the dog."

== Reception ==
Vincent Canby called the film a "clear-eyed, compassionate melodrama about a bunch of young dropouts" and "probably the best teen-agers-in-revolt movie since Jonathan Kaplan's Over the Edge."

On the review aggregator website Rotten Tomatoes, the film holds an approval rating of 93% based on 15 reviews, with an average rating of 6.5/10.
