= Hitler Bad, Vandals Good =

Studio album by The Vandals
- Released: 23 June 1998
- Recorded: 1997–1998
- Studio: NRG Studios, North Hollywood, California
- Genre: Pop punk; punk rock; skate punk; melodic hardcore; comedy rock
- Length: 36:40
- Label: Nitro
- Producer: Warren Fitzgerald

The Vandals chronology
Oi to the World!: Christmas With the Vandals (1996)	Hitler Bad, Vandals Good (1998)	Look What I Almost Stepped In... (2000)

Professional ratings
Review scores
Source	Rating
Allmusic	link
North County Times	A−

Hitler Bad, Vandals Good is the seventh studio album by the southern California punk rock band The Vandals, released in 1998 by Nitro Records.

== Composition ==
Much of the album is characterized by the pop-punk music and humorous lyrics for which the band is known, and it became their most popular and commercially successful album to date. While the band has utilized humor as a basis for much of their lyrical content throughout their career, the humor on their previous album The Quickening had been rooted heavily in sarcasm and dealt with themes of nihilism, anarchism and apathy. By comparison, the humor in Hitler Bad, Vandals Good is more lighthearted, dealing with subjects such as girlfriends, fast food and hairstyles.

The album contains two cover songs. "Come Out Fighting" was originally performed by fellow southern California punk rock band Pennywise and is dedicated to the memory of Pennywise bassist Jason Matthew Thirsk, who died from suicide the previous year. "So Long, Farewell" is a Rodgers and Hammerstein song from the musical The Sound of Music, which has here been re-interpreted using electric guitar, bass and drums as the closing song on the album.

== Release ==
Hitler Bad, Vandals Good was released in June 1998. In November 1999, the band toured South America with The Offspring. An independent music video was later filmed for the song "My Girlfriend's Dead." Two different videos were released: One features the band members and was filmed as part of the Kung Fu Films movie That Darn Punk in 2000, while the other is a fan-created animated video that was included on one of Kung Fu Records' DVD releases.

== Track listing ==
No.	Title	Writer(s)	Length
1.	"People That Are Going to Hell"	Warren Fitzgerald	2:14
2.	"Café 405"	Josh Freese	2:11
3.	"My Girlfriend's Dead"	Fitzgerald	2:41
4.	"I Know, Huh?"	Joe Escalante	2:55
5.	"Money's Not an Issue"	Fitzgerald	3:02
6.	"I've Got an Ape Drape"	Escalante	3:30
7.	"If the Gov't Could Read My Mind"	Fitzgerald	2:22
8.	"Too Much Drama"	Dexter Holland, Escalante, Freese, Fitzgerald	2:47
9.	"Come Out Fighting" (originally performed by Pennywise)	Jason Thirsk	2:52
10.	"Euro-Barge"	Freese	1:56
11.	"Fucked Up Girl"	Fitzgerald	2:36
12.	"An Idea for a Movie"	Escalante	2:38
13.	"OK"	Dave Quackenbush	2:05
14.	"So Long, Farewell" (cover of song from The Sound of Music)	Rodgers and Hammerstein	2:51
Total length:			36:40

== Personnel ==
Band

- Dave Quackenbush – vocals
- Warren Fitzgerald – guitar, keyboards, backing vocals
- Joe Escalante – bass, backing vocals
- Josh Freese – drums, cymbals, backing vocals

Additional musicians

- Gabe McNair – trombone on "F'd Up Girl"
- Jason Freese – saxophone on "F'd Up Girl"
- Stan Freese – tuba on "I Know, Huh?"
- Adrian Young – bongos on "If the Gov't Could Read My Mind"
- Dexter Holland – co-wrote "Too Much Drama"

=== Technical ===
- John Ewing – engineer
- Steve Mixdorf – engineer
- Elvis – assistant engineer
- Craig Neep – engineer
- Warren Fitzgerald – engineer, producer, artwork
- Greg Koller – engineer
- John Tyree – engineer
- Jerry Finn – engineer
- Mackie Osborne – design
- Lisa Johnson – band photo
