= When in Rome Do as The Vandals =

Studio album by The Vandals
- Released: 1984
- Recorded: 1984
- Genres: Hardcore punk, comedy rock
- Length: 30:58
- Label: National Trust
- Producer: Thom Wilson

The Vandals chronology
Peace thru Vandalism (1982)	When in Rome Do as The Vandals (1984)	Slippery When Ill (1989)

When in Rome Do as The Vandals is the first album by the American punk rock band The Vandals, released in 1984 by National Trust Records. Its title is a play on the phrase "When in Rome, do as the Romans do", as the Vandals were also a Germanic tribe which invaded the Roman Empire and helped lead to its destruction. The album's cover played on this theme by showing the Los Angeles Memorial Coliseum in a state of destruction. It was the band's last recording with vocalist Stevo, who left the band shortly after due to personality conflicts with some of the other members.

On the original LP release Brent Turner is credited as having performed all of the bass tracks, but by the time of its release Chalmer Lumary had joined the band on bass. Chalmer's name and photo are therefore included on the album sleeve along with those of the other members. The album sleeve also lists the seventh track as being "It's Not Unusual," a cover of a song by Burt Bacharach. The label on the LP itself, however, correctly lists this track as being a cover of "Hocus Pocus" by the band Focus. The sleeve also lists the album's sixth track as being spelled "Viking Suite," although the label again corrects this error by spelling it "Viking Suit" (as it is pronounced in the song's lyrics).

The album was re-released in 1989 on CD, along with the band's debut EP Peace thru Vandalism as Peace Thru Vandalism / When in Rome Do as The Vandals. The CD was released by Restless Records (later reissued by Time Bomb Recordings) and correctly lists the song titles as described above.

Professional ratings
Review scores
Source	Rating
AllMusic	link

== Track listing ==
All songs written by The Vandals except where indicated

No.	Title	Length
1.	"Ladykiller"	3:44
2.	"Birthday Bash"	2:52
3.	"Master Race (In Outer Space)"	1:43
4.	"Big Brother vs. Johnny Sako"	3:04
5.	"Mohawk Town"	2:49
6.	"Viking Suit"	3:48
7.	"Hocus Pocus" (written and originally performed by Focus)	2:56
8.	"I'm a Fly"	1:59
9.	"Slap of Love"	2:17
10.	"Airstream"	2:17
11.	"Rico"	3:18
Total length:		30:58

== Personnel ==
- Steven Ronald "Stevo" Jensen - vocals, scratch box on "Ladykiller"
- Jan Nils Ackermann - guitar, acoustic guitars on "Mohawk Town" and "Rico"
- Brent Turner - bass
- Joe Escalante - drums, trumpet on "Rico"
- Chalmer Lumary - backing vocals

== Album information ==
- Record label:
  - original LP release: National Trust Records
  - CD re-release: Restless Records (1989), Time Bomb Recordings (1995)
- Produced by Thom Wilson
- Art & design by Mike Doud
- Cover photos by Alan Newberg
- Sleeve photos by Mike Leczkowski
