= Hollywood Potato Chip =

- The original album cover, with lettering mimicking the logo of Variety.

Studio album by The Vandals
- Released: 29 June 2004
- Recorded: 2003–2004 at SoundCastle Studios in Silverlake, California and at Formula One Studios in Fullerton, California
- Genre: Pop punk; punk rock; skate punk; melodic hardcore; comedy rock
- Length: 33:24
- Label: Kung Fu
- Producer: Warren Fitzgerald

The Vandals chronology
Live at the House of Blues (2004)	Hollywood Potato Chip (2004)	Shingo Japanese Remix Album (2005)

Alternative cover
- The replacement cover with redesigned lettering, issued after a cease and desist order from Variety.

Hollywood Potato Chip is the tenth studio album by the Southern California punk rock band The Vandals, released in 2004 by Kung Fu Records. A music video starring guitarist and producer Warren Fitzgerald was filmed for the band's cover version of Queen's "Don't Stop Me Now". The album's title is a euphemism for dried semen on a casting couch. Its original cover art used lettering that parodied the logo of Variety, prompting legal action and a cease and desist order from the magazine which resulted in a replacement cover with redesigned lettering. In 2010 the magazine brought further legal action against the band over third-party uses of the original cover appearing on the internet.

== Cover artwork controversy ==
The album's cover was a source of legal controversy. A few months after the album's release, entertainment industry magazine Variety issued a cease and desist order against The Vandals over the design of the band's name on the album cover. The design mimicked the logo of the magazine as an intentional comment on the materialistic culture of Hollywood, and the magazine accused the band of trademark infringement. The lawsuit was settled with redesigned lettering which appears on all subsequent pressings of the album.

However, in April 2010 Variety filed a lawsuit against the band in a Delaware court, suing them over images of the original cover appearing on the internet. The magazine claimed that the band "ignored their agreement" and were "misusing our mark". The Vandals claimed that they had ceased using the parody logo per the terms of the cease and desist order, and they were not responsible for images placed on the internet by third parties:

We agreed not to use this logo anymore and we have no product for sale with this logo so their claims that we are intentionally using it and harming the Daily Variety are ludicrous. Now they are in the process of punishing us with an abusive lawsuit filed in Delaware, where none of the parties reside or do business, because this will cause us the most financial harm and when we get sick of it, and realize we can't afford to fight them, we will pay them the money. That is our opinion of what is going on because we cooperated in every way to try to take the images down, but they filed the suit anyway.... in Delaware.

The original lettering on the album's cover parodied the logo of Variety, resulting in a legal controversy.

The Vandals planned a benefit show to raise money to cover their legal fees, and considered legal action against Variety to lift the injunction against use of the original logo: "After reading the public filing against us by the Daily Variety it is clear they are abusing this injunction to shake us down for money, and by filing against us when there are no prohibited images on any sites under our control, they have breached the settlement agreement between us. We did not agree to be responsible for third party distributors of this product. That was clear in the settlement agreement." The band promised two tickets to the benefit to anyone who was able to notify them of a usage of the Variety-mocking logo on a site under the band's control. In April 2011 The Vandals successfully petitioned to have the case moved from Delaware to California. The band used their website to taunt Variety lawyer Henry Horbaczewski and editor Peter Bart, saying "The Plaintiffs should all be ashamed and it is the Vandals' opinion that [Variety's lawyers] are liable for malpractice damages by ruining their client's reputation in a frivolous attempt to act like Godzilla when it comes to hoarding their precious font and inhibiting protected free speech." Variety agreed to drop the case in February 2012. Bassist Joe Escalante, who has a background as an entertainment lawyer and represented The Vandals in the lawsuit, called it "the worst thing that's ever happened to me, and to the band, and the hardest thing I've ever done. However, the crash course in federal court litigation made me a better lawyer."

== Track listing ==
All tracks are written by Warren Fitzgerald, except where noted.

No.	Title	Length
1.	"How They Getcha'"	2:07
2.	"Don't Stop Me Now" (Freddie Mercury; originally performed by Queen)	2:51
3.	"My Neck, My Back"	2:06
4.	"Be a Good Robot"	2:25
5.	"Manimal"	2:48
6.	"My Special Moment"	2:33
7.	"Designed by Satan" (Fitzgerald, Joe Escalante)	2:32
8.	"Atrocity" (Fitzgerald, Dave Quackenbush)	2:43
9.	"Dig a Hole"	1:57
10.	"Don't Make Me Get My Fat, Lazy Ass Off This Couch"	2:33
11.	"I Guess I'll Take You Back"	2:32
12.	"Christian or Canadian" (Fitzgerald, Escalante)	2:27
13.	"I Am Crushed"	3:49
14.	"Steal the Flag" (bonus track on International Version)	2:47
Total length:		33:24

== Personnel ==
=== Band ===
- Dave Quackenbush – vocals
- Warren Fitzgerald – guitar, backing vocals, lead vocals on Don't Stop Me Now, producer
- Joe Escalante – bass guitar, backing vocals
- Josh Freese – drums

=== Production ===
- Greg Koller and Kevin Augunas – recording engineers
- Jeremy Mackenzie and Jon St. James – assistant engineers
- Jason Gossman and Seth Waldman – mix engineers
- Brain Gardner – audio mastering
- Tony Vitali – illustrations and art direction
- Lisa Johnson – band photos
