= Cuckoo's Nest (nightclub) =

Nightclub in Costa Mesa, California, US

Coordinates: 33.63687°N 117.9313°W

General information
- Type: Nightclub
- Location: 1714 Placentia Avenue, Costa Mesa, California, United States
- Opened: 1976
- Closed: 1981

Cuckoo's Nest (1976–1981) was a nightclub that was located at 1714 Placentia Avenue in Costa Mesa, California. The club was founded in 1976 by Jerry Roach, a former bar owner who had turned to selling real estate, after receiving the property from a client as a commission payment. A local Costa Mesa bar that was already in operation was named Jaws, after the film, and Roach took inspiration from this and named his new venture after One Flew Over the Cuckoo's Nest, the big box-office draw of that year, to make the club's name easily memorable. The club became known for punk rock.

== Rise of punk ==
At first the club catered to fans of conventional rock. After almost two years, a slow period hit the business and in February 1978 Roach decided to give the bands that played a relatively new form of music called punk rock a shot.

There were no venues in southern California at that time that would book punk bands due to the extremely negative reputation the fledgling scene had earned itself, as well as the costly damage done to some venues by punk fans, which had resulted in more than a few having to close their doors due to legal problems and finances. Several of these early Huntington Beach area punk bands, such as Vicious Circle and The Slashers had extremely violent and hardcore fans who made it a point to be as destructive and criminally-minded as possible, being fully pledged in allegiance to the anarchistic ethos of punk rock, wreaking havoc at a lot of shows that had taken place at other clubs. This trend relegated punk bands to play almost exclusively for free at house-parties, and keeping the majority of the southern westcoast scene underground. The first punk show to take place at The Nest was a benefit for the legendary Los Angeles punk club, The Masque, and took place on February 16, 1978. The owner of The Masque, Brendan Mullen, brought along the bands that performed that night, which included; The Skulls, The Bags, The Controllers, and Steamin' Freeman.

In the early 80's, the club claimed to be the biggest punk club in Orange County. Bands who performed there include the Adolescents, FEAR, Social Distortion, T.S.O.L., the Vandals, Iggy Pop, Ramones, Dead Kennedys, 999, the Misfits, Circle Jerks, Wasted Youth, Agent Orange, the Go-Go's, Red Kross, the Minutemen, the Blasters, the New York Dolls.

Henry Rollins' first show with Black Flag was at the Nest on August 21, 1981.

== Conflict with Zubie's ==
Cuckoo's Nest sat at the back within a shared parking lot of a liquor store, a transmission shop, a laundromat, as well as a bar and grill next door named Zubie's that had an "urban cowboy" motif, which attracted a mainly blue-collar crowd. The parking lot of The Nest was as popular a hangout as the club itself, and was usually filled with punks. There were almost nightly confrontations between the punks from the Cuckoo's Nest and the cowboys from Zubie's, being almost always started by the latter, who would usually hurl homophobic and ignorant remarks at the punks and were known to assault them without provocation, regardless of age or gender.

Jack Grisham of T.S.O.L. said in 1998, "They'd come out of Zubie's drunk, and there'd be fights every night. There's a videotape of me beating up these two cowboy guys, and I was wearing a dress at the time. I was trying to tick my dad off for a while, and wearing a dress was working good." One night a group of cowboys even came out of Zubie's wearing football helmets and carrying baseball bats, looking to spill some blood in the crowded parking lot. Around 80 punks rushed at the rednecks, who dropped their bats and took off running, with the police coming to their rescue. Another night at the club, an on-duty police officer drew his firearm on a cowboy who had come into the Cuckoo's Nest with a loaded 9 mm pistol, who claimed he had been jumped by a group of punks outside and was looking for revenge. The Zubie's patrons would also be combative towards the security force of The Nest for defending the punks, which escalated into an all-out gang fight one night in the parking lot between them and a large group of rednecks during a T.S.O.L. show. Despite this, several band members and patrons of the Cuckoos Nest claimed that the club bouncers could be as aggressive as the neighbors, and were known to drag anyone who got too out of control out the back door, where they would work them over.

The police already had a strong dislike for punks, and the constant fighting between them and the presentably decent folk at Zubie's, along with an ever-growing presence of punks in their town centering at the Cuckoo's Nest, started to become a major annoyance to them. They began harassing the punks, seeing them as the problem, and Roach soon found himself gaining the contempt of both his business neighbors and the city council and police, all of whom saw him as essentially fostering and encouraging delinquent and subversive behavior. He was admittedly not even a fan of punk music, but nevertheless saw it as the unquestionable right of the kids to be into and to play without persecution or victimization.

After an incident involving punk band names being tagged across a 100 foot long wall of Five Points Plaza next to a large slogan which read "Death to Huntington Beach Pigs!", which members of the band Youth Brigade have taken credit for in the decades since, the police would stop and detain any person they identified as a punk based on their haircuts and clothing. They were reported to have been often combative and vulgar with the punks, intimidating them with authority and calling them names like "faggots", and assembled a massive "Punk File" which contained names and Polaroids of all detainees for future use during investigations.

== Downfall ==
In the beginning it was the punks fighting either the pseudo-cowboys and macho jock types, or early long haired metal heads and leftovers from the hippie generation, all of whom saw punks as an outright affront to civil decency and established "normality". Within the confines of the largely affluent Republican area of Orange County at the time, homophobia and classism was rife, and many people saw the homemade clothing and provocative hair of punks as a free pass to unload nearly socially encouraged ignorance and elitism.

Violence had been to a degree always a part of the scene, being downright necessary most of the time in relation to self defense, but began to steadily escalate within the club between the punks themselves as more and more violent and macho types began to get into punk rock and go to shows at the Cuckoo's Nest, believing the media hype surrounding punk that it was primarily about fighting and taking drugs rather than the music. The punk scene as a whole was beginning to splinter, and progressively there were a lot of rules and codes of conduct being established within a group who were supposed to say "fuck the rules". Differing factions would often clash over disagreements regarding bands, political ideals, drugs of choice, to even more ridiculous points of contention such as hair length. If you had slightly long hair or smoked pot, you were a hippie, and would often get beat down. Mike Ness of Social Distortion had part of the upper cartilage of his left ear bitten off in the parking lot during a fight that stemmed from a methed out punk, who didn't like that he was smoking a joint. The word "poseur" started getting tossed around a lot at the club, ironically enough, usually being flung by new punks. Senseless violence also began to be perpetrated by both some of the bands while they were on stage, as well as the crowd, as stage diving and slam dancing shifted from harmless fun and starting to get progressively and genuinely violent at times. At the same time, punk was gaining a certain degree of popularity within the youth as a whole, and started to be viewed as a real threat to established order. In the early days, people would usually just gawk or laugh at punks, and it usually wouldn't go beyond childish name calling. However, with each newspaper or television story constantly portraying punks as a bonafide and ever-growing youth gang dedicated to hatred, hedonism, and crime, the general public started to see punks as nothing other than thugs and losers who needed to be dealt with. Jim Kaa, guitarist of the Crowd, said in 1998:

"[The scene at the Cuckoo's Nest] was crazy; it was young, and the police didn't know what the crazy punks were about. There was a lot of fighting, not just [against] the people at Zubie's but punks against punks. 'The Legend of Pat Brown' epitomizes the entire craziness of that whole era."

As tensions mounted within the community regarding the Cuckoo's Nest, the police started to station themselves outside of the club on a nearly nightly basis and started cracking down hard on both the punks and the club itself. Undercover officers, usually posing as cowboys but sometimes as punks, started to be a regular sight in the parking lot. Arrests became commonplace in and around the club, for even the tiniest infraction (jaywalking and littering were popular offenses), and steadily escalated to the point where business started to suffer. There was a very real threat that patrons could be arrested for any number of reasons before they ever even stepped inside the club.

This ultimately led to an incident in the parking lot on the night of January 30, 1981, when an infamous punk and club regular named Pat Brown attempted to run over two police officers with his car. According to an eyewitness account of Casey Royer, Brown was driving through the parking lot with a group of friends while he had a beer in his hand, looking for a place to park. He was stopped by a man dressed as a cowboy, who approached the car, quickly told Pat that he was a cop, and reached inside the car to presumably put it in park. Pat punched the gas and took off, with the undercover officer hanging onto the car. An on-duty officer was catapulted over the hood of the car, who had come to backup the other officer, who some say Pat intentionally swerved to hit. The undercover officer was dragged several hundred feet before letting go and firing three shots into Brown's car, which had upwards of two passengers in it. He then ripped out of the parking lot and sped up Placentia Avenue with no headlights on. No one was seriously injured, although both officers were taken to the hospital. Brown was pulled over a few blocks away for his headlights not being on, but was quickly arrested for attempted murder, after he was beaten severely by the police. Soon after the incident, the Costa Mesa city council revoked the entertainment permit for the Cuckoo's Nest. Roach took the matter to court, claiming that the city had violated the constitutional rights of free speech and liberty for both himself and the punks. In March 1981, an Orange County Superior Court judge ruled in favor of the city, and rejected the allegations that the city had at any point been unjustly fair in its decision. However, less than a month later the California Supreme Court overturned the lower court's ruling, and The Nest was allowed to reinstate live music, much to the disapproval of the city. In total, Roach had been fighting the city for nine months to ensure that the basic freedoms of himself and his customers couldn't be trampled, with no help from anyone.

Not soon after the club began to showcase bands again, Roach was blindsided by the city when they took advantage of the fact that the Cuckoo's Nest did not have a licensed dance permit, and effectively crippled the club by imposing a ban on dancing, refusing to issue a permit, and having a judge uphold the ban in court. The police started to strengthen their presence and upheld the ban without exception, making countless arrests, and club attendance dwindled drastically by December 1981 from nearly 350 people a night, to a few dozen some nights. In his 1981 film on the subject Urban Struggle, Roach suggested that perhaps this was the first time that the authorities would stamp out a fad, but also asserted that a scene with as much intensity as punk-rock could not and would not die out; it would merely go back underground and continue to bubble under the surface.

The club finally closed its doors in 1981 as a result of the dance ban, as Roach said he did not want to see kids being arrested for simply expressing themselves. Almost all those involved believe this was the city's plan from the beginning, to systematically wear him down, since they could not simply shut him down and smother the punk scene. He said in later years that he would have continued on fighting the city, had he had financial backers or more support from the very scene that he was fighting for. In 1982 the building became another music venue called The Concert Factory before closing down again after a couple of years. The space was then absorbed by former adversary Zubie's and became a pizzeria named Zubie's Gilded Cage. The former site of The Cuckoo's Nest, along with Zubie's, was bought in 1998 by Hank's Electric Supplies, who demolished both to make way for a warehouse. Roach, who went back to real estate after the club closed, said he was relieved it would be demolished: "I don't have fond memories of losing, of unfairly having my means of making money taken away from me ... "I still think I was railroaded, but that's the breaks. I don't have any nostalgia for it. I'm kind of glad it's getting torn down. I'd rather have it not be there than be a pizza place." Jack Grisham of T.S.O.L. also said: "It was wrecked the day Zubies got it."

== In media ==
The Vandals' songs "The Legend of Pat Brown" and "Urban Struggle" cover the parking lot battles between Cuckoo's Nest and Zubie's patrons.

In 1981, as the police started to sporadically raid the club, Roach hired a student film-maker named Paul Young to record them when they did so. The idea to film a documentary about the club and the punk scene came about from there, and Roach and Young began interviewing and filming the bands and club patrons. The footage was compiled into a documentary, roughly 40 minutes in length, titled Urban Struggle: The Battle of the Cuckoo's Nest. The film also goes into the legal battles that surrounded the nightclub and Roach's defiant effort to "shove punk rock right up their asses".

We Were Feared – The Story of the Cuckoo's Nest, directed by Jonathan W.C. Mills and executive produced by York Shackleton, premiered at the 2010 Newport Beach Film Festival. The film includes interview footage from Urban Struggle, which led to a copyright claim from Young.

Clockwork Orange County: The Rise of West Coast Punk Rock (2012), directed by Jonathan W.C. Mills, features performance footage from the 1981 Urban Struggle documentary and more recent interviews.
