= Look What I Almost Stepped In... =

Studio album by The Vandals
- Released: August 29, 2000
- Recorded: Grand Master, Hollywood, California
- Studio: 2000
- Genre: Punk rock; skate punk; melodic hardcore; comedy rock
- Length: 38:30
- Label: Nitro
- Producer: Warren Fitzgerald

The Vandals chronology
| Hitler Bad, Vandals Good (1998) | Look What I Almost Stepped In... (2000) | Internet Dating Superstuds (2002) |

Professional ratings
Review scores
| Source | Rating |
|---|---|
| Allmusic | 4/5 stars |
| Ox-Fanzine | Favorable |

Look What I Almost Stepped In... is the eighth studio album by the southern California punk rock band The Vandals, released in 2000 by Nitro Records. It was recorded in April 2000. It was the band's final album for Nitro, as they moved to their own label Kung Fu Records the following year.

== Composition ==
Much of the album is characterized by the pop-punk music and humorous lyrics for which the band is known.

Although regular Vandals drummer Josh Freese is credited as a band member and appears in band photos in the album's liner notes, he was unavailable to play on the album due to other musical commitments. The band therefore called on regular substitute Brooks Wackerman, who had filled in for Freese on several occasions as a touring drummer. Wackerman himself is an accomplished drummer who would join Bad Religion the following year. The album also features guest appearances by Dexter Holland of The Offspring (who also co-wrote "Jackass"), Jack Black and Kyle Gass of Tenacious D, musician/actor/screenwriter Scott Aukerman, and members of the New Jersey band Bigwig.

== Release ==
Look What I Almost Stepped In... was released in August 2000. In October, the band embarked on a tour of the UK, with support from the Ataris and Bigwig. Between June and August 2001, the group performed on the Warped Tour. Later in the month, the band played three shows in the UK as part of the Extreme 2001 festival.

== Track listing ==
All tracks are written by Warren Fitzgerald, except where noted.

| No. | Title | Length |
|---|---|---|
| 1. | "Behind the Music" | 2:44 |
| 2. | "Sorry, Mom and Dad" | 2:34 |
| 3. | "Go" | 2:17 |
| 4. | "The New You" (Fitzgerald, Dave Quackenbush) | 2:41 |
| 5. | "Flowers Are Pretty" | 3:17 |
| 6. | "Jackass" (Joe Escalante, Dexter Holland) | 3:20 |
| 7. | "What About Me?" | 2:20 |
| 8. | "You're Not the Boss of Me (Kick It)" (Quackenbush) | 3:21 |
| 9. | "I'm the Boss of Me" | 2:00 |
| 10. | "That's My Girl" | 2:26 |
| 11. | "Get a Room" | 2:48 |
| 12. | "San Berdu" | 3:13 |
| 13. | "Crippled & Blind" | 2:25 |
| 14. | "Fourteen" | 3:04 |
| Total length: | | 38:30 |

== Personnel ==
- Dave Quackenbush - vocals
- Warren Fitzgerald - guitar, backing vocals
- Joe Escalante - bass, backing vocals
- Brooks Wackerman - drums
- Jack Black - backing vocals on "Fourteen"
- Kyle Gass - backing vocals on "Fourteen"
- Scott Aukerman - backing vocals on "That's My Girl"
- Dexter Holland - backing vocals on "Jackass"
- Bigwig - gang vocals

== Album information ==
- Record label: Nitro Records
- Recorded at Grand Master Studios in Hollywood, California
- Produced by Warren Fitzgerald
- Engineered by:
  - Bradley Cook at Grand Master Studios in Hollywood with assistance from Andrew Alekel
  - Chris Sheldon at Westlake Studios in Hollywood with assistance from Jason Rankins
  - Eddy Schreyer at Oasis Mastering in Studio City, California
  - John Tyree (assistant engineer) at Ocean Way in Hollywood
- Mixed by Chris Sheldon at Westlake Studios in Hollywood
- Mastered at Oasis Mastering in Studio City
- All songs copyright 2000 by Puppety Frenchman Music, SEAC
- Cover art by Shag
- Art direction by Kris Martinez
- Band photo by Lisa Johnson
- Additional artwork by Mickey Stern
