= Live Fast, Diarrhea =

Studio album by The Vandals
- Released: 1 May 1995
- Recorded: 1994–1995 at Formula One Studios in La Habra, California
- Genre: Punk rock
- Length: 31:40
- Label: Nitro
- Producer: Warren Fitzgerald

The Vandals chronology
| Sweatin' to the Oldies: The Vandals Live (1994) | Live Fast, Diarrhea (1995) | The Quickening (1996) |

Live Fast, Diarrhea is the fourth studio album by the southern California punk rock band The Vandals, released in 1995 by Nitro Records. It was the band's first album for Nitro, a label started and co-owned by Dexter Holland and Greg Kriesel of The Offspring. It was also the first to be produced by Vandals guitarist Warren Fitzgerald, who would continue to produce most of their albums throughout their career, and the first to include Brooks Wackerman, who often substituted for regular drummer Josh Freese. It was a breakthrough release for the band, who would release three more albums on Nitro before moving to their own label Kung Fu Records in 2002.

The album's title is a play on the saying "live fast, die young," a popular phrase in the punk community of the late 1970s and early 1980s. The album cover is a drawing by Fitzgerald of a man shooting a pistol at an airplane, with the title misspelled as "diarrea." The artwork in the liner notes includes a memo stating that the band may absolutely not use this picture on the cover. This seems to indicate that the drawing was intended as a concept for an actual photo of a man shooting at a plane, but that someone, possibly at the record label, forbade the band from using such a photo, so they simply substituted the concept drawing.

An independent music video was filmed for the song "I Have a Date," which is a cover of a song by a relatively obscure Orange County punk band called The Simpletones. "Supercalifragilisticexpialidocious" is also a cover, of a song from the Disney movie Mary Poppins. On the track there is a musical nod to Bad Religion's 'Fuck Armageddon, This is Hell' in the intro and 'We're Only Going To Die' in the breakdown of this song. Other references to Disney occur in the songs "Get in Line," which describes the experience of waiting in line at a theme park ride and includes an unmistakable message from a Disneyland attraction, and "Power Mustache," which deals with an employee grooming policy at Disneyland. Several of the band members visited Disneyland frequently as youths, and this was not the first time they had referenced it in song. "Ape Shall Never Kill Ape" is also a film reference, to the original Planet of the Apes.

Both the album and band gained increased attention thanks to an episode of the popular television show The X-Files which aired on June 10, 1995 (episode 3x03: "D.P.O."). Actor Giovanni Ribisi plays a teenager in a small town who has the power to control electricity and summon lightning, and wears a number of Vandals T-shirts throughout the episode. The final scene shows Ribisi's character incarcerated but using his power to change the channels on a television while the Vandals song "Live Fast, Diarrhea" plays. According to the band the idea to include their music came from X-Files creator Chris Carter, who was a longtime fan of punk rock and also a friend of band member Joe Escalante.

== Reception ==
Professional ratings
Review scores
| Source | Rating |
|---|---|
| AllMusic | link |

AllMusic reviewer Stephen Thomas Erlewine gave the album 1-and-a-half stars, stating that "the Vandals haven't grown up at all on their fifth album" and that "neither their humor nor their musical skills have developed past the junior-high level, as they still pound out three-chord punk at a fast clip, shouting out jokey vulgarities."

== Track listing ==
| No. | Title | Writer(s) | Length |
|---|---|---|---|
| 1. | "Let the Bad Times Roll" | Josh Freese | 1:47 |
| 2. | "Take it Back" | Dave Quackenbush | 2:00 |
| 3. | "And Now We Dance" | Warren Fitzgerald | 2:04 |
| 4. | "I Have a Date" (originally performed by the Simpletones) | Jay Lansford | 2:17 |
| 5. | "Supercalifragilisticexpialidocious" | Robert & Richard Sherman | 1:53 |
| 6. | "Power Mustache" | Fitzgerald | 2:08 |
| 7. | "N.I.M.B.Y." | Joe Escalante, Fitzgerald | 2:05 |
| 8. | "Ape Shall Never Kill Ape" | Escalante, Fitzgerald | 2:38 |
| 9. | "Live Fast, Diarrhea" | Escalante, Fitzgerald, Freese, Quackenbush | 1:37 |
| 10. | "Happy Birthday to Me" | Fitzgerald | 2:10 |
| 11. | "Change My Pants (I Don't Wanna)" | Fitzgerald | 2:37 |
| 12. | "Get in Line" | Fitzgerald | 2:02 |
| 13. | "Johnny Twobags" | Quackenbush | 3:14 |
| 14. | "Kick Me" | Escalante | 2:16 |
| 15. | "Soup of the Day" | Quackenbush | 0:53 |
| Total length: | | | 31:40 |

== Performers ==
- Dave Quackenbush - vocals
- Warren Fitzgerald - guitar, backing vocals, lead vocals on "I Have a Date"
- Joe Escalante - bass, backing vocals
- Josh Freese - drums
- Brooks Wackerman - backing vocals on "Live Fast, Diarrhea"

== Album information ==
- Record label: Nitro Records
- Recorded at Formula One Studios in La Habra, California
- All songs copyright and published 1995 by Greco-Roman Publishing Co., except "I Have a Date" (Covina High Music BMI) and "Supercalifragilisticexpialidocious" (1963 Sherman Music/Wonderland Music Co., Inc. BMI).
- Engineered by Greg Nelson at Paramount Studios in Hollywood, California and Barry Conoly at Mambo Studios in Long Beach, California.
- Mastered at Futuredisc by Eddy Schrayer.
- Produced by Warren Fitzgerald
- Graphics by Mackie Osborne
- Drawings by Warren Fitzgerald
