= Peace thru Vandalism =

EP by The Vandals
- Released: 1 July 1982
- Recorded: 1982
- Genres: Hardcore punk, comedy rock
- Length: 15:26
- Label: Epitaph
- Producer: Thom Wilson

The Vandals chronology
Peace thru Vandalism (1982)	When in Rome Do as The Vandals (1984)

Peace thru Vandalism is the debut EP by the American punk rock band The Vandals, released in 1982 by Epitaph Records. It was one of the first releases to be put out by the Epitaph label, founded in 1981 by Brett Gurewitz of Bad Religion. The EP was later released in 1989 on Restless Records featuring the original authorship of the songs as a Vinyl, 12", EP, 33⅓ RPM, Reissue as well as The EP being re-released by Time Bomb Recordings in 1989 as a CD that also included the band's first LP, When in Rome Do as the Vandals. The CD release is titled Peace Thru Vandalism / When in Rome Do as The Vandals.

The EP introduced the band's style of fast punk rock with humorous, tongue-in-cheek lyrics and subject matter. This style would continue throughout the band's career, as they have always shown a preference for lighthearted humor over serious or controversial subjects such as political and social issues. At the time of the EP's release this was a somewhat novel concept, as most punk bands in the Los Angeles and Orange County areas focused on politics, social and personal issues in their music.

== Subject matter ==
Several of the songs on the EP deal with events from the band members' own lives, but presented in a humorous and lighthearted manner. "Urban Struggle" depicts the constant fighting that would occur in the early 1980s Los Angeles/Orange County music scene between the punk rock fans who congregated at a Costa Mesa, California club called the Cuckoo's Nest and the country music fans who gathered at nearby Zubie's. The song received radio airplay on KROQ-FM's Rodney on the ROQ program and was the band's first minor "hit" in the punk community. "The Legend of Pat Brown" is about a Cuckoo's Nest patron who was arrested after he ran over two police officers, while "Pirate's Life" tells of riding the Pirates of the Caribbean ride at Disneyland while taking the drug LSD. "H.B. Hotel" is a cover of the Elvis Presley song "Heartbreak Hotel" with parodied lyrics. Perhaps the most well-known song from the EP is "Anarchy Burger (Hold the Government)," which became something of an anthem for the band and was played at their shows well into the late 1990s. The song gained renewed interest when it was mentioned in the 2002 Vin Diesel movie xXx. The track "Urban Struggle" has been featured in the film SLC Punk! and the show Jackass, followed by the second film and game adaptation.

== Track listing ==
All songs written by The Vandals except where indicated.

No.	Title	Length
1.	"Wanna Be Manor" (Ackermann/Jensen)
2.	"Urban Struggle" (Ackermann/Jensen)
3.	"The Legend of Pat Brown" (Ackermann/Jensen)
4.	"Pirate's Life" (Ackermann/Escalante)
5.	"H.B. Hotel" (contains an interpretation by Jensen of "Heartbreak Hotel" written by Thomas Durden, and Mae Boren Axton and originally performed by Elvis Presley)
6.	"Anarchy Burger (Hold the Government)" (Jensen/Escalante)
Total length:		15:26

== Performers ==
- Steven Ronald "Stevo" Jensen – vocals
- Jan Nils Ackermann – guitar
- Steve "Human" Pfauter – bass
- Joe Escalante – drums
- Brett Gurewitz – backing vocals on "Anarchy Burger (Hold the Government)"

== Album information ==
- Record label:
  - original EP release: Epitaph Records
  - CD re-release: Restless Records (1989), Time Bomb Recordings (1995)
    - EP re-release: Restless Records (1989) Restless Records – 7 72327-1
- Produced by Thom Wilson
- Cover art by Fritz Quadrata and Art Bad
