= Oi to the World! =

- The original 1996 album cover

Studio album by The Vandals
- Released: 8 October 1996
- Recorded: 1996 at Formula One Studios in La Habra, California
- Genre: Christmas; pop punk; punk rock; skate punk; melodic hardcore; Oi!; comedy rock; comedy punk
- Length: 29:16
- Label: Kung Fu
- Producer: Warren Fitzgerald

The Vandals chronology
The Quickening (1996)	Oi to the World! (1996)	Hitler Bad, Vandals Good (1998)

Alternative cover
- The cover used for the 2000 re-release and subsequent printings

Oi to the World! is a Christmas album by the southern California punk rock band the Vandals. It was released in 1996 by their label Kung Fu Records, who also re-released it in 2000 with altered artwork and a bonus track. It was the band's sixth full-length studio album and presented holiday-themed songs written and performed with the tongue-in-cheek humor for which the band is known.

Because Kung Fu Records itself had been formed in 1996 and was at this point still a small label, the original pressing of the album was somewhat limited and it remained relatively obscure for several years (the band's major studio albums at this time were being released by Nitro Records). The Vandals maintained a close friendship with fellow Orange County band No Doubt, who covered the album's title track "Oi to the World" for the Christmas compilation album A Very Special Christmas 3 in 1997. Their version, which was produced by Vandals guitarist Warren Fitzgerald, received mainstream exposure and popularity and spawned a music video. Partly thanks to the exposure brought by association with No Doubt (with whom the Vandals also toured), fan interest in Oi to the World! increased and in 2000 Kung Fu Records, which by now had grown in size, re-released the album with new artwork and a bonus overture, as well as a new intro for the title track.

Because Vandals full-time drummer Josh Freese was involved with other musical projects at the time of the album's recording, a number of fill-in drummers were recruited to play most of the drum tracks on the album: Brooks Wackerman of Infectious Grooves, Suicidal Tendencies and future drummer of Bad Religion, Erik Sandin of NOFX, and Rat Scabies of The Damned. Freese did play on three of the album's tracks, and both his brother Jason Freese and father Stan Freese also appeared playing horns. The original release was dedicated to the memory of Pat Brown, a friend of the band during their formative years and subject of their 1982 song "The Legend of Pat Brown". He had died in 1996.

Almost every year since the album's release the Vandals have played a traditional "Winter Formal" concert in Anaheim during the holiday season, at which they perform Oi to the World! nearly in its entirety. Other than at this special show songs from the album are rarely performed in concert, with the exception of "Oi to the World", which has become a regular part of their setlist.

== Reception ==
Professional ratings
Review scores
Source	Rating
AllMusic	2/5 stars

Stephen Thomas Erlewine of AllMusic gave the album a negative review, remarking that "If you do happen to enjoy their ridiculously stupid jokes, Oi to the World is nearly as fun as anything else in their catalog, even though you might admit their fast, goofy, and essentially tuneless songs are beginning to wear a bit thin."

== Track listing ==
All tracks are written by Warren Fitzgerald, except where noted.

No.	Title	Writer(s)	Length
1.	"A Gun for Christmas"		3:01
2.	"Grandpa's Last Xmas"		2:11
3.	"Thanx for Nothing"		2:09
4.	"Oi to the World"	Joe Escalante	2:15
5.	"Nothing's Going to Ruin My Holiday"		2:24
6.	"Christmas Time for My Penis"	Fitzgerald, Dave Quackenbush	3:16
7.	"I Don't Believe in Santa Claus"		1:34
8.	"My First Xmas (As a Woman)"		2:41
9.	"Dance of the Sugarplum Fairies"	Pyotr Ilyich Tchaikovsky	1:19
10.	"Here I Am Lord"	Dan Schutte	2:17
11.	"C-H-R-I-S-T-M-A-S"	The Yobs	1:47
12.	"Hang Myself from the Tree"		6:26
Total length:			29:16

2000 re-release bonus track
No.	Title	Length
13.	"Overture"	3:57
Total length:		33:46

== Personnel ==
=== Band ===
- Dave Quackenbush – vocals
- Warren Fitzgerald – guitar, backing vocals, lead vocals on track 12, string arrangements on track 6
- Joe Escalante – bass guitar, backing vocals, lead vocals on track 10
- Josh Freese – drums on tracks 4, 10 and 11

=== Additional musicians ===
- Brooks Wackerman – drums and traps on tracks 1, 5, 7 & 9
- Erik Sandin – drums on tracks 3 & 8
- Rat Scabies – drums on track 2
- Stan Freese – tuba
- Jason Freese – saxophone
- Suzanne LaRoque – cello
- Christina Placilla – viola
- Elizabeth Johnson – violin
- Vidal Hulbert – violin

=== Production ===
- Warren Fizgerald – producer, engineer

=== Artwork ===
- Warren Fitzgerald – drawings
- "Punker Tommy" – band photo
- Adam Swinbourne – cover art (re-release)
- Lisa Johnson – band photo (re-release)
- Scott Matthews – back cover and insert background photos (re-release)
- Sergie – artwork (re-release)
