= Chris Pedersen (actor) =

American musician, actor, NASCAR racer and autonomous vehicle builder

- Born: May 22, 1963 (age 63); San Francisco, California, U.S.
- Occupations: Musician, race car driver, actor
- Musical career
- Genre: Punk rock
- Instrument: Guitar
- Years active: 1981–present

Chris Pedersen (born May 22, 1963) is an American musician, actor, and NASCAR racer.

Pedersen was born in San Francisco and grew up in Southern California. He was the lead guitarist and wrote original material with the punk rock band The Dumps in Santa Barbara, CA 1980–81. In 1981 he briefly played guitar for the punk rock band SIN 34. He was the lead singer / guitarist in the band The Patriots when he went into acting.

Pedersen was never formally trained as an actor. He was approached by director Penelope Spheeris at a park in Burbank where the band T.S.O.L. was playing. According to Pedersen, who was unemployed at the time, "I was thinking 'yeah, right' and didn't pay any attention to her until she said it paid $100 a day, which at the time was a lot of money. So I showed up for the audition on time and tried really hard not to screw it up. That was the start of my acting career." He played a punk rocker in Suburbia, and also appeared in Platoon, Night of the Comet and Point Break among others.

Pedersen began to distance himself from the film industry in the early 1990s, focusing instead on cars and technology. He had a brief racing history competing in weekly NASCAR events at Saugus speedway 1992–1995 and Irwindale Speedway in 2000. He founded and led a self-funded DARPA Grand Challenge team, the "AI Motorvators", whose V8-powered "IT Came From The Garage" finished in the semi-finals in 2004 and 2005; they were featured in an episode of the Discovery Channel show Monster Garage.

== Filmography ==
Year	Title	Role	Notes
1983	Suburbia	Jack Diddley	
1984	Night of the Comet	Stock Boy	
1985	Sylvester	"Red"	
1986	Platoon	Crawford	
1988	Two Moon Junction	"Speed"	
1989	Born on the Fourth of July	An Aid	
1989–2001	Baywatch	Rudy	TV series
1991	Point Break	"Bunker" Weiss	
1992	Twin Peaks: Fire Walk with Me	Tommy	
1992	Blindsided	Stoney	TV movie
1993	The Hit List	Tommy	
1995	The Stranger	Junior Katz	
2014	Twin Peaks: The Missing Pieces	Tommy	
