= Steve Pfauter =

American bass guitarist (1963–2022)

Steve "Human" Pfauter
- Born: Stephen O. Pfauter; November 7, 1963; San Francisco, California, United States
- Died: June 12, 2022 (aged 58); Glendale, California
- Genres: Hardcore punk, punk rock, comedy rock
- Occupations: Musician, Bassist, Set dresser, Actor, Swing gang, Film industry
- Instruments: Bass, Vocals
- Years active: 1979–2022
- Labels: Epitaph Records; Flipside Records; Restless Records
- Website: www. stevepfauter.com

Stephen O. "Human" Pfauter (November 7, 1963 – June 12, 2022) was an American musician and set dresser and former bass guitarist for the punk rock band The Vandals, from 1980 until 1984.

== Biography ==
Steve Pfauter was born to German immigrants and attended Los Alamitos High. He joined The Vandals in 1980 and played bass guitar on their debut EP, Peace thru Vandalism. Pfauter designed T-shirts for T.S.O.L. and created artwork for the Dead Kennedys. He also played bass in the original Los Angeles punk rock band Detox, making two full-length albums which featured six songs he wrote while touring the US and Canada. Later he joined Ken All Night Rocker. Human also roadied for T.S.O.L. on their first two nationwide tours in 1980-1982. Once known for T-shirt designs, he owned his own silkscreen shop at age sixteen. He worked in the film industry as a set dresser and worked on productions such as Leaving Las Vegas, High Crimes and Spider-Man 3.

== Discography ==
=== The Vandals ===
- Peace Thru Vandalism (1982)

=== Detox ===
- Detox (1985)
- We Don't Like You Either (1988)
