= Darling Buds of May (album) =

Studio album by Faulter
- Released: September 19, 2006
- Genre: Alternative rock, emo, post-hardcore, pop-punk
- Length: 39:56
- Label: Abacus Recordings
- Producer: Jon Saint James

Professional ratings
Review scores
Source	Rating
AllMusic	3.5/5 stars
Punknews.org	1.5/5 stars
Read Junk	2/5 stars

Darling Buds of May is the debut and only album by the rock band Faulter. It was released on September 19, 2006 on Abacus Recordings.

== Track listing ==
All tracks by Andy Carpenter except where noted.

No.	Title	Writer(s)	Length
1.	"Sixes & Sevens"		4:21
2.	"I Think We Need to Talk"		3:39
3.	"October 16th"		3:53
4.	"Holding On"	Carpenter, Faulter	4:09
5.	"There You Go"		1:09
6.	"Eyes Like Stars"		3:57
7.	"Through With False Starts"		3:52
8.	"Ten in the Clear"	Cross	3:21
9.	"Remember"	Carpenter, Levindofske	3:13
10.	"Chaos & Monotony"	Carpenter, Dooley	4:34
11.	"Darling Buds of May"		3:42

== Personnel ==
- Kevin Augunas – engineer
- Andy Carpenter – producer, mixing
- Jason Freese – organ
- Josh Freese – drums
- Mike Levindofske - vocals, writer
- Skip Hahn – pedal steel
- Greg Koller – engineer
- Jon Saint James – producer, mixing, management
- Jason Upright – A&R
- Ben Wilson – artwork, layout design
