= The Quickening (The Vandals album) =

Studio album by The Vandals
- Released: 15 July 1996
- Recorded: 1996 at Front Page Studios, Paramount Studios, Formula One Studios, and Planet of the Tapes Studios
- Genre: Punk rock; skate punk; melodic hardcore; comedy rock
- Length: 28:36
- Label: Nitro
- Producer: Warren Fitzgerald

The Vandals chronology
Live Fast, Diarrhea (1995)	The Quickening (1996)	Oi to the World!: Christmas With the Vandals (1996)

Professional ratings
Review scores
Source	Rating
AllMusic	link

The Quickening is the fifth studio album by the southern California punk rock band The Vandals, released in 1996 by Nitro Records. Much of the album is characterized by themes of nihilism and teen angst, but presented with the tongue-in-cheek humor for which the band is known.

Both the band and the album attracted increased attention due to their involvement with the film Glory Daze. The Vandals recorded several songs for the film's soundtrack, including the main theme, and the soundtrack album was released on their Kung Fu Records label that had been started by guitarist Warren Fitzgerald and bassist Joe Escalante earlier that year.

An independent music video was filmed for the song "It's a Fact" and two versions were released: one with clips from the movie and one without. Because drummer Josh Freese was not available due to other commitments, regular substitute Brooks Wackerman appears in the video as the band's drummer.

== Recording labels ==
Several studios were involved in the release of The Quickening, the album was produced by Warren Fitzgerald and recorded in early part of 1996 at various studios including Front Page Studios, Paramount Studios, Formula One Studios and the Planet of the Tapes Studios.

The album was released on July 15, 1996, by Nitro Records.

== Track listing ==
All tracks are written by Warren Fitzgerald, except where noted.

No.	Title	Writer(s)	Length
1.	"Stop Smiling"		1:42
2.	"It's a Fact"		2:05
3.	"Marry Me"	Josh Freese, Dave Quackenbush	2:17
4.	"Allah"	Fitzgerald, Quackenbush	1:28
5.	"Tastes Like Chicken"	Fitzgerald, Quackenbush	2:03
6.	"(But Then) She Spoke"		1:56
7.	"How (Did This Loser Get This Job?)"	Fitzgerald, Joe Escalante	1:38
8.	"Hungry for You"	Quackenbush, Chris Lagerborg	2:16
9.	"Failure Is the Best Revenge"		1:58
10.	"Aging Orange"	Fitzgerald, Escalante	1:59
11.	"Canine Euthanasia"		1:53
12.	"Moving Up"		1:59
13.	"(I'll Make You) Love Me"		1:47
14.	"Choosing Your Masters"	Escalante	1:38
15.	"I Believe"	Fitzgerald, Quackenbush	1:48
Total length:			28:27

== Performers ==
- Dave Quackenbush - vocals
- Warren Fitzgerald - guitar, vocals on "Hungry for You"
- Joe Escalante - bass, backing vocals
- Josh Freese - drums
- Chris Lagerborg - backing vocals on "Allah"

== Album information ==
- Record label: Nitro Records
- Recorded winter of 1996 at Front Page Studios, Paramount Studios, Formula One Studios, and Planet of the Tapes Studios.
- All songs copyright and published 1996 by Puppety Frenchman Music, BMI.
- Engineered by Warren Fitzgerald and Mon Agronot.
- Mastered at Futuredisc by Tom Baker.
- Produced by Warren Fitzgerald
- Graphics by Mackie Osborne.
- Cover photo by Joe Escalante.
