= Internet Dating Superstuds =

Studio album by The Vandals
- Released: 17 September 2002
- Recorded: Spring 2002
- Studio: Rumbo Studios in Canoga Park, California and Pulse! Recording in Hollywood, California
- Genre: Pop punk; punk rock; skate punk; melodic hardcore; comedy rock
- Length: 38:22
- Label: Kung Fu
- Producer: Warren Fitzgerald; Ryan Williams

The Vandals chronology
Look What I Almost Stepped In... (2000)	Internet Dating Superstuds (2002)	Live at the House of Blues (2004)

Professional ratings
Review scores
Source	Rating
Allmusic	link

Internet Dating Superstuds is the ninth studio album by the southern California punk rock band The Vandals. An independent music video was filmed for the song "43210-1."

Much of the album is characterized by the pop-punk music and humorous lyrics for which the band is known. Its title, artwork and bonus features satirize several aspects of internet culture. The song lyrics printed in the album's liner notes are all partially obscured by depictions of popup ads similar to those encountered while web surfing. As a promotion for the album, the band members held an online contest in which four fans each won a "date" with one of the band members. These "dates" were videotaped and including in the enhanced CD-ROM portion of the CD. Other bonus content in this portion of the album includes a photo gallery and unobscured lyrics.

== Release ==
It was released in 2002 by Kung Fu Records. It was the band's first album after their permanent move to Kung Fu, after having fulfilled their contract with Nitro Records in 2000. The Kung Fu label had been started in 1996 by Vandals members Joe Escalante and Warren Fitzgerald and had already released a Vandals Christmas album and several re-releases of the band's older material.

In November and December, the group headlined the Kung Fu Records 2002 tour in the US and UK with support from Tsunami Bomb and Audio Karate. At the end of the year, the group embarked on an Australian leg with The Ataris. This was followed by a European leg with Tsunami Bomb and Audio Karate in January and February 2003. Drummer Josh Freese did not appear on these dates as he was recording with A Perfect Circle.

== Track listing ==
All tracks are written by Warren Fitzgerald, except where noted.

No.	Title	Writer(s)	Length
1.	"43210-1"		2:41
2.	"Appreciate My Honesty"		2:33
3.	"I'm Becoming You"		2:40
4.	"Disproportioned Head"		2:06
5.	"Soccer Mom"	Josh Freese	2:56
6.	"We'll All Get Laid"		2:25
7.	"Little Weirdo"		3:04
8.	"I Can't Wait"		2:42
9.	"Where's Your Dignity?"		3:09
10.	"My Brain Tells My Body"		2:59
11.	"When I Say You I Mean Me"	Dave Quackenbush	2:18
12.	"The Unseen Tears of the Albacore"	Joe Escalante, Fitzgerald	3:09
13.	"My Brother is Gay"	Quackenbush, Fitzgerald	2:31
14.	"Lord of the Dance"		3:08
Total length:			38:22

== Personnel ==
- Dave Quackenbush - vocals
- Warren Fitzgerald - guitar, backing vocals
- Joe Escalante - bass, backing vocals, trumpet on "My Brother is Gay"
- Josh Freese - drums

== Album information ==
- Record label: Kung Fu Records
- Recorded at Rumbo Studios in Canoga Park, California and Pulse! Recording in Hollywood, California in Spring of 2002.
- Produced by Warren Fitzgerald, co-produced by Ryan Williams
- Engineered by Ryan Williams with assistance by Jeremy Blair at Rumbo Studios and Jonas Grabarnick at Pulse! Recording
- Mixed by Paul Q. Kolderie at Q Division in Boston, Massachusetts
- Mastered by Eddy Schreyer at Oasis Mastering in Studio City, California
- All songs copyright 2002 by Puppety Frenchman Music, SEAC
- Cover art by Parker Jacobs at Paul Frank Industries
- Art direction by Mickey Stern
- Band photos by Lisa Johnson
- Additional layout by Ryan James
