= The Vandals =

American punk band

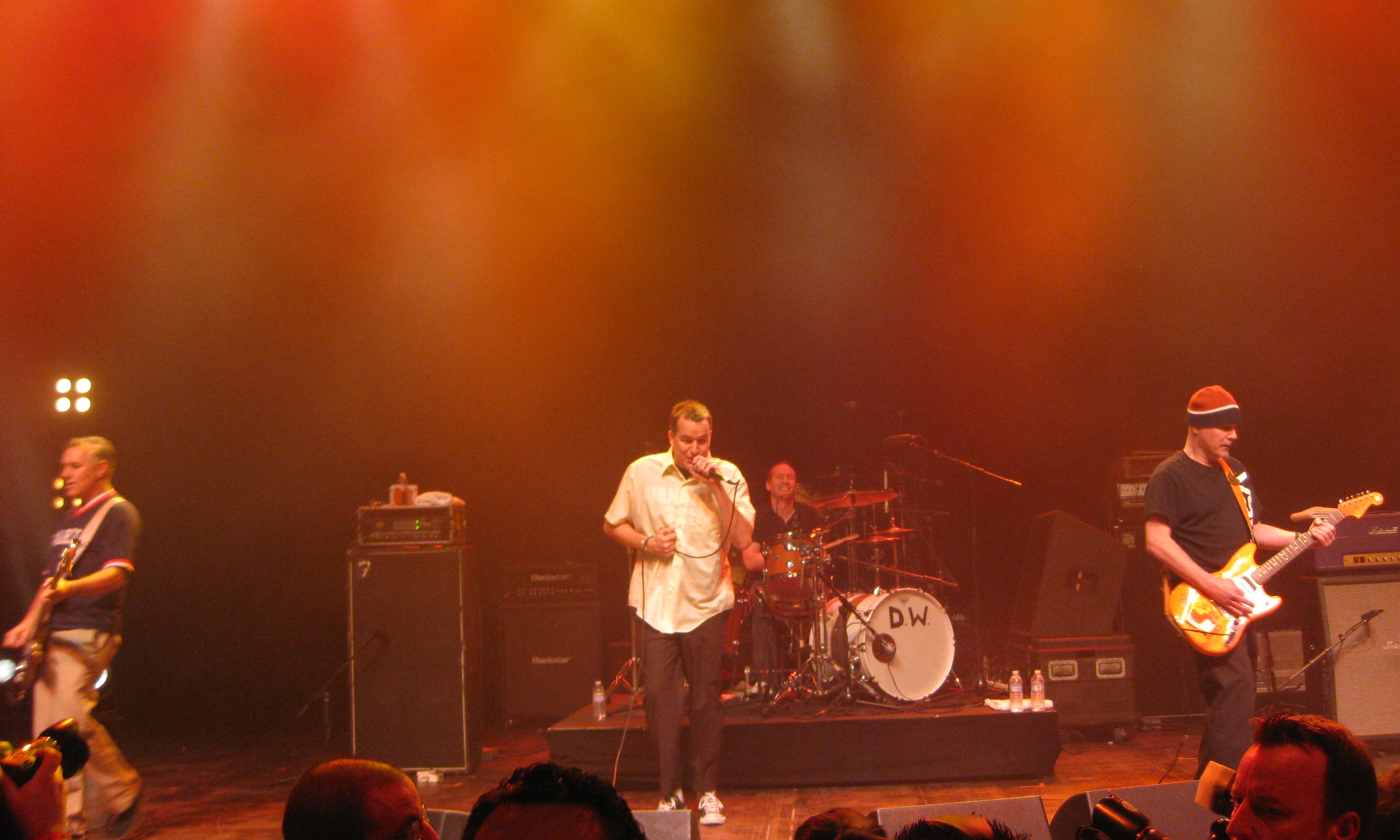
- Left to right: Escalante, Quackenbush, Freese, and Fitzgerald in 2011

Background information
- Also known as: S.N.I.V. (Stevo's New and Improved Vandals); Anarchy Taco
- Origin: Huntington Beach, California, U.S.
- Genre: Punk rock
- Works: Discography
- Years active: 1980–present
- Labels: Epitaph; National Trust; Enigma; Restless; Triple X; Nitro; Kung Fu; Time Bomb; Cleopatra
- Members: Joe Escalante; Dave Quackenbush; Warren Fitzgerald; Josh Freese
- Past members: Jan Nils Ackermann; Steven Ronald Jensen ("Stevo"); Steve "Human" Pfauter; Vince Mesa; Steve Gonzalez; Bob Emory; Brent Turner; Chalmer Lumary; Robbie Allen; Doug MacKinnon; Todd Barnes
- Website: vandals.com

The Vandals are an American punk rock band, established in 1980 in Orange County, California. They have released ten full-length studio albums, three live albums, three live DVDs and have toured the world extensively, including performances on the Vans Warped Tour. They are well known for their use of humor, preferring to use their music as a vehicle for comedy and sarcasm rather than as a platform for more serious issues. Kung Fu Records, founded in 1996 by Escalante and Fitzgerald has signed and launched many punk rock bands.

The band's lineup fluctuated significantly over their first nine years, though founding members Steven Ronald Jensen, guitarist Jan Nils Ackermann, and first consistent drummer Joe Escalante remained regular fixtures. Of the early members, only Escalante has remained through all subsequent incarnations of the band. The lineup of Escalante, Dave Quackenbush, Warren Fitzgerald, and Josh Freese has remained intact since 1990 and is generally considered far removed from the band's early 1980s incarnation. Since 2002 Escalante has released all of the band's albums through his Kung Fu Records label, with Fitzgerald generally producing.

== History ==
=== Early years (1980–1984) ===
The Vandals formed in 1980 in Huntington Beach, California, by guitarist Jan Nils Ackermann. Soon vocalist Steven Ronald "Stevo" Jensen (1959 – August 21, 2005) was found and he and Ackermann practiced and performed with a rotating cast of other members before a permanent lineup coalesced to include bassist Steve "Human" Pfauter and drummer Joe Escalante. Other early members included Steve Gonzalez on bass and Vince Mesa on drums.

The band quickly built a reputation in the Los Angeles and Orange County punk rock community. The Vandals distinguished themselves in their scene by sticking to humorous subject matter rather than the typical social and political topics addressed by most punk bands of the time.

The Vandals performing in Tucson, Arizona, in 1984, showing original members Stevo and Jan Nils Ackermann, with bassist Chalmer Lumary in the background).

In 1982 the group became the second band to sign with Epitaph Records, the Los Angeles label run by Bad Religion's Brett Gurewitz, who released their first EP, Peace thru Vandalism. The record contained several songs that would become fan favorites and remained in the band's live set well into the 1990s, including "Urban Struggle," which became a local hit after receiving airplay on KROQ-FM's Rodney on the ROQ program.

Most of the record's subject material was drawn directly from the band's own experiences in their local punk rock scene. "The Legend of Pat Brown" told tales of a substance-abusing friend of the band who was notorious for causing mayhem, while "Pirate's Life" dealt with the experience of riding Disneyland's Pirates of the Caribbean ride while taking LSD. The aforementioned "Urban Struggle" dealt with the constant fights that would occur between the punk rock fans who congregated at a Costa Mesa club called the Cuckoo's Nest and the country music fans who gathered at nearby Zubie's. "Anarchy Burger (Hold the Government)" approached the philosophy of anarchism, advocated by many early punk bands, from a humorous perspective and became one of the band's most popular songs throughout their career.

In 1984 the band appeared in the film Suburbia by invitation of director Penelope Spheeris, who had also directed the influential The Decline of Western Civilization. They also played a benefit concert for the Cypress College Young Republicans, along with the Circle Jerks, the Dickies and D.I., an action which prompted derision from the predominantly leftist and anarchist punk community. It would not be the last time the band's actions would draw criticism, with their music generally maintaining an apolitical position.

When Pfauter left the band in 1984, Eric VonArab (Love Canal) filled in on bass while the band was writing and rehearsing for their first album until Brent Turner was brought in to play bass on the recording of that album, When in Rome Do as the Vandals. By the time of its release in 1985 on National Trust Records Chalmer Lumary had joined as the band's full-time bassist. The album explored different musical styles and contained several songs that would become fan favorites. "Ladykiller" incorporated scratching and dance beats, while "Mohawk Town" explored a mixture of punk rock and country music. Personality clashes between members led to Stevo's departure from the band shortly thereafter. He was replaced by Dave Quackenbush of the band Falling Idols, who has remained the Vandals' vocalist. In 1987 the band appeared in another Penelope Spheeris film, Dudes.

=== Quackenbush, Fitzgerald, and Freese join (1984–1989) ===
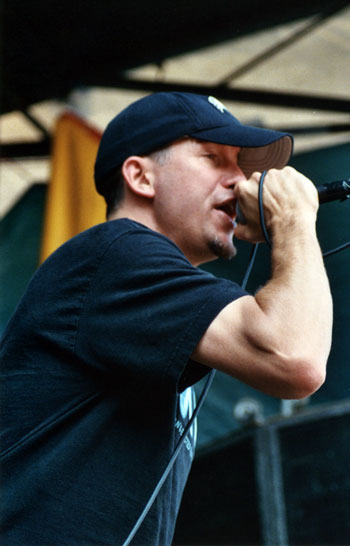
Dave Quackenbush replaced Stevo as the Vandals' singer in 1985.

By 1989 Lumary had left the band and Robbie Allen joined them in the studio to play bass on the album Slippery When Ill. The album was something of a departure from the punk rock formula of their previous releases, fusing country and western styles with their humorous brand of punk into a sound the band called "cow punk," somewhat mocking the resurgence in popularity of country music in their native Huntington Beach. The joking style confused many of their fans and the album would remain in obscurity until its 1999 re-release as The Vandals Play Really Bad Original Country Tunes. By the time of the album's release the band had recruited new drummer Doug MacKinnon and Escalante had moved to bass, a position he would remain in for the rest of the band's career.

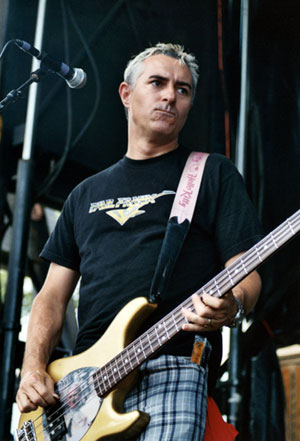
After the departure of the band's early members, bassist Joe Escalante retained rights to the Vandals' name and catalogue.

Following the release of Slippery When Ill the band went through several lineup changes, as drummer MacKinnon and founding-guitarist Ackermann both left the group.

With Escalante asserting control over the band, Stevo, Ackermann, Lumary, and T.S.O.L. drummer Todd Barnes played a show billed as the Vandals, later as S.N.I.V. (Stevo's New and Improved Vandals). Escalante has stated that the older members relinquished control of the band's name and rights to him in exchange for permission to play the show, but the others deny this claim and point out that Escalante served an injunction against them during the performance preventing them from further use of the name and music.

The departure of Ackermann and MacKinnon left Escalante and Quackenbush searching for a new guitarist and drummer. The Vandals had previously played shows with a band called Doggy Style and had been intrigued by the wacky antics of their guitarist Warren Fitzgerald, and they soon recruited him as their new permanent guitarist. Also around this time Escalante and Quackenbush made many visits to Disneyland, where they witnessed Josh Freese playing electronic drums in the children's cover band Polo on the Tomorrowland Terrace stage. They persuaded him to join, solidifying the Vandals lineup of Quackenbush, Fitzgerald, Escalante, and Freese which would remain constant throughout the rest of their career (with occasional substitutes filling in for Freese).

=== Role in '90s punk revival (1990–2000) ===
In 1990 the new lineup recorded Fear of a Punk Planet, an album which established their presence amongst an emerging new crop of California punk rock bands including Green Day, NOFX, the Offspring, Rancid, Pennywise, and Sublime. It spawned their first music video, for the song "Pizza Tran," which received airplay on local punk and rock television shows.

In 1992 Escalante graduated from law school and became a television executive at CBS, using money from his job to finance the band and his television connections to allow them to play on late-night rock shows. At a New Year's Eve party at which Escalante was unable to play, actor Keanu Reeves filled in for him on bass. Fitzgerald and Freese, meanwhile, moved towards careers as professional musicians. Freese became a sought-after studio drummer, while Fitzgerald began a three-year stint as guitarist for Oingo Boingo.

In 1992, Freese and Fitzgerald formed Xtra Large with vocalist Darren McNamee and Big Drill Car bassist Bob Thomson. Xtra Large released one album on Giant Records, titled Now I Eat Them.

In 1994 the band released Sweatin' to the Oldies, a live album and video which featured mostly performances of songs from Peace thru Vandalism and When in Rome. From this point on the band would play fewer and fewer of these older songs in their live sets, concentrating instead on newer material.

By 1995 punk rock had gained nationwide mainstream popularity, and the Vandals signed to Offspring singer Dexter Holland's new label Nitro Records. They released the album Live Fast, Diarrhea to positive reception and supported it with tours throughout the United States and Europe, including a spot opening for fellow Orange County rockers No Doubt. The album and band garnered increased attention thanks to an episode of the popular television show The X-Files in which actor Giovanni Ribisi played a character who wears Vandals T-shirts and listens to their music.

1996 saw the release of The Quickening, a slightly more nihilistic and aggressive album that was supported by a music video for "It's a Fact." That year Escalante and Fitzgerald also founded the record label Kung Fu Records, initially created in order to release an album by the Riverside band Assorted Jelly Beans. The label also released the soundtrack to the movie Glory Daze, which featured music from both the Vandals and Assorted Jellybeans and a theme written by Fitzgerald. At the end of the year the band also released a Christmas album, Oi to the World!, on Kung Fu. Although it remained the band's most obscure release for several years, the title track became somewhat famous when it was covered by No Doubt in 1997. Their version was produced by Fitzgerald and made into a music video. Other than "Oi to the World!," songs from the album are generally not part of the Vandals' live setlist, except for their annual "Winter Formal" concert at which they generally perform the album in its entirety. Sweatin' to the Oldies was also re-released by Kung Fu in 1997 with bonus tracks.

In 1998 the band released Hitler Bad, Vandals Good, their most popular album yet which focused more on lighthearted humor with songs such as "My Girlfriend's Dead" and "I've Got an Ape Drape." The band continued to tour, including stints on the Vans Warped Tour. In 1999 they re-released most of Slippery When Ill as The Vandals Play Really Bad Original Country Tunes on Kung Fu. The members also starred in the Kung Fu-produced internet television series Fear of a Punk Planet, later released on DVD.

2000 saw a trio of releases from the band, beginning with a 10-year anniversary edition of Fear of a Punk Planet that was released by Kung Fu. This was followed by Look What I Almost Stepped In..., their final album under their contract with Nitro. Because of other musical commitments Freese was unavailable to play on the album, so substitute Brooks Wackerman filled in as drummer for the album's recording and some accompanying tours. At the end of the year Kung Fu re-released Oi to the World!, making it much more widely available than it had been in previous years. Escalante also launched the Kung Fu imprint Kung Fu Films in 2000 with the release of the film That Darn Punk, in which he starred and the other band members also appeared. The Vandals also contributed new songs to the film's soundtrack.

=== Kung Fu Records years (2000–present) ===
By the end of 2000 the Vandals had fulfilled their contractual obligations to Nitro Records, and moved their operations fully to Kung Fu. The Kung Fu label had grown since its founding in 1996 and was well-positioned to provide the recording, marketing, and touring support the band's popularity now necessitated, including marketing and touring opportunities in Japan. With Escalante acting as president of the label the band's operations could also run more smoothly. In 2001 the band performed on the entire run of the Vans Warped Tour.

The band's first new album for Kung Fu was Internet Dating Superstuds, released in 2002. They held an online contest in which the winners were each awarded a "date" with one of the band members. These "dates" were filmed and included on the CD-ROM portion of the album, which used an internet theme in its artwork. They once again performed on the Warped Tour, and would play select dates on subsequent Warped Tours over the next three years. The Sweatin' to the Oldies video was also re-released on DVD that year by Kung Fu.

The Vandals performing for US troops in Baghdad in December 2004, with substitute drummer Byron McMackin.

In July 2003 the Vandals filmed a live concert album and DVD at the House of Blues in Anaheim as part of Kung Fu's The Show Must Go Off! series. It was released the following year and featured mostly songs written from 1995 to 2002. 2003 also saw the release of Hollywood Potato Chip, which strayed a bit from the pop-punk formula of their 1990s work.

In December 2004 the band traveled to Iraq and played several shows for US troops in the area, with drummer Byron McMackin of Pennywise filling in for Freese. Some fans and contemporaries in the punk community criticized this decision, claiming that it implied the band supported the US-led war in Iraq. The band members defended their actions by pointing out that their music is deliberately apolitical and that whatever their individual political views might be, they were eager to show support for the troops. This was followed by a tour of Europe, on which some dates were cancelled due to protests and picketing by groups who felt the band's actions constituted a pro-war stance.

In 2005 the Shingo Japanese Remix Album was released, composed of versions of the band's songs remixed by Japanese DJ Shingo Asari. That August the band played a benefit show for the legendary New York rock club CBGB. In the same month, original singer Stevo died of a drug overdose.

In April 2006 the Vandals once again returned to the Middle East with McMackin to perform for US troops, this time in Afghanistan. They continue to tour when the members' schedules permit, as they also have other music-related obligations outside the band. Freese continues to act as a studio drummer for a multitude of recording artists. Fitzgerald writes and produces songs and albums for other artists as well as movie scores, and occasionally acts, having starred in the Kung Fu film Cake Boy. Escalante continues to own and operate Kung Fu Records and Kung Fu Films, signing bands and making films such as the Show Must Go Off! series and Cake Boy. He retired from legal practice in 2005 and hosted the call-in radio show Barely Legal Radio on Indie 103.1 FM, where he dispensed entertainment and legal advice to aspiring musicians. In May 2006 he became the station's drive-time morning show host, replacing former Mighty Mighty Bosstones singer Dicky Barrett. In 2007 the Vandals played the first four dates of the Warped Tour.

In August 2008 the Vandals played nine dates of the 2008 Warped Tour with Sum 41 drummer Steve Jocz filling in for Josh Freese, who was touring with Nine Inch Nails. On August 12 the band released BBC Sessions and Other Polished Turds, a collection of rare songs and b-sides, exclusively as a digital release.

In January 2015, the band recorded a version from the song I'm An Individual, originally recorded by the Australian footballer Mark Jacko Jackson, for the Australian Soundwave 2015 Compilation, launched in February of that year.

In July 2020 the band released a new rarities album named Curse of the Unripe Pumpkin.

== Original band's reformation ==
In 1989, the original Vandals reformed with original singer Stevo, Jan Nils Ackermann on guitar, Chalmer Lumary on bass and with Todd Barnes on drums, playing a show. Legal matters ensued, preventing further performances. Then, In 2008, the original Vandals reunited once more under the new moniker of "Anarchy Taco" as to prevent further legal action and restrictive measures on the group's original members.

Similar to the 1989 reunion, Anarchy Taco was put together by the band's founder, Jan Nils Ackermann. The band collects alumni Steve "Human" Pfauter and Chalmer Lumary from the group's original records, as well as vocalist Worm, and drummer James. The group's setlist usually encompasses the material recorded by the band from 1982–1984.

== Lawsuit between members ==
A CD re-release combining Peace thru Vandalism and When in Rome Do as the Vandals had also been in print since 1989 through Time Bomb Recordings with the credit "all songs written by Joe Escalante." The former members asserted that most of these songs had been written before Escalante joined the group, that he had misappropriated their intellectual property, and that he had not paid them royalties due from the licensing of these songs. Lawsuits ensued, resulting in an undisclosed settlement which allowed Escalante to continue licensing the band's back catalogue. A subsequent licensing of the song "Urban Struggle" for the movie Jackass Number Two credited the group as a whole.

== Band members ==
=== Current ===
- Joe Escalante – bass (1988–present), drums (1980–1988), backing and occasional lead vocals (1980–present)
- Dave Quackenbush – lead and backing vocals, occasional guitar (1984–present)
- Warren Fitzgerald – guitars, backing and lead vocals (1989–present)
- Josh Freese – drums (1989–present)

=== Former ===
- Jan Nils Ackermann – guitars, backing vocals (1980–1989)
- Steven Ronald Jensen ("Stevo") – lead vocals (1980–1984; died 2005)
- Vince Mesa – drums (1980)
- Steve Gonzalez – bass (1980)
- Bob Emory – bass (1980)
- Steve "Human" Pfauter – bass (1980–1984; died 2022)
- Brent Turner – bass (1984)
- Chalmer Lumary – bass (1984–1985)
- Robbie Allen – bass, backing vocals (1985–1989)
- Doug MacKinnon – drums (1988–1989)

Notable fill-ins

Due to Josh Freese's job as a full-time studio drummer he has sometimes been unable to play live or on tours with the band. Temporary drummers have included:

- Brooks Wackerman (Suicidal Tendencies, Infectious Grooves, Bad Religion, Avenged Sevenfold)
- Adrian Young (No Doubt)
- Byron McMackin (Pennywise)
- Chris Lagerborg
- Derek Grant (The Suicide Machines, Alkaline Trio)
- Ty Smith (Guttermouth, Bullets and Octane, Black President, Jughead's Revenge)
- Damon DeLaPaz (Fenix TX, 30 Foot Fall)
- Eric VonArab (Love Canal, Doggy Style) on bass, Escalante moved to drums
- Steve Jocz (Sum 41)
- Actor Keanu Reeves also filled in on bass at a New Year's Eve show in 1993 when Escalante was unable to perform.

=== S.N.I.V. (Stevo's New and Improved Vandals) ===
- Steven Ronald Jensen ("Stevo") – lead vocals (1989; died 2005)
- Jan Nils Ackermann – guitars, backing vocals (1989)
- Chalmer Lumary – bass (1989)
- Todd Barnes – drums (1989; died 1999)

== Discography ==
Studio albums

- When in Rome Do as the Vandals (1984)
- Slippery When Ill (1989)
- Fear of a Punk Planet (1990)
- Live Fast, Diarrhea (1995)
- The Quickening (1996)
- Oi to the World! (1996)
- Hitler Bad, Vandals Good (1998)
- The Vandals Play Really Bad Original Country Tunes (1999)
- Look What I Almost Stepped In... (2000)
- Internet Dating Superstuds (2002)
- Hollywood Potato Chip (2004)
