= Steven Ronald Jensen =

American musician

Steven Ronald "Stevo" Jensen
- Also known as: Stevo
- Born: Steven Ronald Jensen; April 29, 1959; Los Angeles County, California, United States
- Died: August 20, 2005 (aged 46); Maui, Hawaii
- Genres: Punk rock, comedy rock
- Occupations: Singer, composer, actor
- Instruments: Vocals, scratch box, flute
- Years active: 1980–1989.
- Labels: Epitaph, National Trust, Restless Records, Posh Boy Records.
- Formerly of: The Vandals, S.N.I.V. (Stevo's New Improved Vandals)

Steven Ronald "Stevo" Jensen (April 29, 1959 – August 21, 2005) was an American musician and an original founding member of The Vandals, alongside Jan Nils Ackermann. The band was based out of Huntington Beach, California, United States. After performing for some time in different bands in Southern California, Ackermann decided to form The Vandals, enlisting Jensen as vocalist.

"I admired the way Mike Roche and Ron and Bob Emory (Ron's older brother) dressed and acted, and I followed in their footsteps," Jensen recalled. But before long, he developed his own outrageous take on punk that was far from T.S.O.L.'s glowering style.

"I said, 'We're going to have a good time with it. We're going to make fun of everybody and we're going to have fun doing it,' " Jensen said. "That's what I wanted – fun." After performing with Steve Gonzalez and Vince Mesa, the original line-up of The Vandals performed at the Costa Mesa Club, the Cuckoo's Nest, owned by Jerry Roach. Stevo and the Vandals performed that night with China White and Shattered Faith before Gonzalez and Mesa left the initial group. Steve Soto from Adolescents and Agent Orange, rehearsed with Jan Nils Ackermann on bass guitar previous to the Peace thru Vandalism line-up of The Vandals recording, constructing bass parts for many future songs; along with early notables on bass who helped write songs such as Bob Emory, Steve Gonzalez and Steve "Human" Pfauter.

Jensen died on August 20, 2005 in Maui, Hawaii from a prescription drug overdose. He was 46 years old.

== Peace thru Vandalism ==
In mid-1981, Jensen and Jan Nils Ackermann sought a lineup for their band that could consistently both record, and perform live shows, for possible touring purposes. After many bassists came and went, The Vandals eventually recruited Steve "Human" Pfauter as their full-time permanent bassist, before adding Joe Escalante on the drums. Escalante's presence completed the original Peace Thru' Vandalism era lineup of the band, which went on to perform and record for the remainder of 1981 throughout Southern California. Jensen then entered the studio with this Vandals' lineup in 1982 and recorded the Peace Thru Vandalism EP with Thom Wilson as producer. Released later that year on Epitaph Records, Peace Thru Vandalism is the only EP that The Vandals have recorded as of 2017.

Year	Album details
1982	Peace thru Vandalism^{[I]}: Released: 1982; Label: Epitaph; Format: EP

Personnel

- Steven Ronald "Stevo" Jensen: vocals
- Jan Nils Ackermann: guitar
- Steve "Human" Pfauter: bass
- Joe Escalante: drums

Backing Vocals on "Anarchy Burger (Hold The Government): Brett Gurewitz

Produced by: Thom Wilson

== Suburbia ==
In 1983, Stevo and The Vandals were approached to appear in Suburbia, a film written and directed by Penelope Spheeris and produced by Roger Corman. It is a disturbing and prophetic story of rebellious, homeless kids squatting in abandoned houses, trying to make new families, and protecting one another. Suburbia won first place at the Chicago Film Festival. Jensen performed live singing in the band for the movie and subsequent soundtrack.

== When in Rome, Do as the Vandals ==
After performing extensively in Southern California and playing out of town concerts in Arizona, Jensen recorded The Vandals' first album, When in Rome Do as The Vandals. The album was released on National Trust Records in 1984 after disagreements with The Vandals' previous label, Epitaph, resulted in withheld royalties for sales of the band's Peace thru Vandalism. By the time 'When in Rome' was recorded in studio, bassist Steve Human had left the band and was replaced by Chalmer Lumary from the Huntington Beach punk rock band, The Hated. However, Lumary soon broke his arm, preventing him from playing bass, Eric VonArab filled in briefly on bass before Brent Turner was brought in to record the album's bass tracks using previously captured audio from live performances and rehearsals for guidance. Lumary was able to sing backup vocals on the album and later joined Stevo and the Vandals as the band's fulltime bassist following the album's release.

Personnel

- Steven Ronald "Stevo" Jensen - vocals, scratch box on "Ladykiller"
- Jan Nils Ackermann - guitar, acoustic guitars on "Mohawk Town" and "Rico"
- Brent Turner - bass
- Joe Escalante - Drums, trumpet on "Rico"
- Chalmer Lumary - backing vocals
- Record label:
  - original LP release: National Trust Records (1984)
  - CD re-release: Restless Records (1989), Time Bomb Recordings (1995)
- Produced by Thom Wilson
- Art & design by Mike Doud
- Cover photos by Alan Newberg
- Sleeve photos by Mike Leczkowski

== Leaving the Vandals ==
After providing lead vocals for The Vandals during the band's early years performing throughout Southern California and Arizona, Jenson left the Vandals in 1984. His departure followed a period of inactivity for the band caused by friction and personality conflicts regarding performance during live shows.

== Compilations ==
- "Rodney on the ROQ volume 3" ℗1982 (V/A) Posh Boy Records. Vocalist on "Urban Struggle"
- "When Men Were Men... And Sheep Were Scared" ℗1985 Bemisbrain Records. Vocalist on "Dachau Cabana" and "Frog Stomp"
- "Stage Diving to the Oldies" ℗1995 (V/A) Restless Records. Vocalist on "Lady Killer" and "Mohawk Town"
