= Joe Escalante =

American musician and television producer

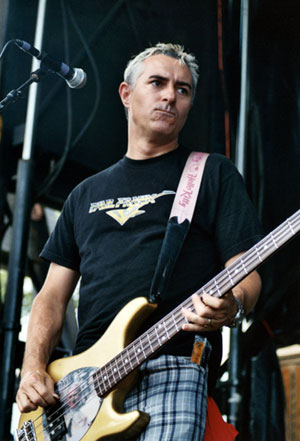
- Escalante performing with The Vandals on the 2004 Warped Tour in Noblesville, Indiana.

Background information
- Born: Joseph Patrick Escalante; January 30, 1963 (age 63); Long Beach, California
- Origin: Rossmoor, California
- Genres: Punk rock, comedy rock
- Occupations: TV writer; musician; record label owner; film director; music video director; radio show host; former entertainment lawyer and television executive
- Instruments: Bass guitar; drums; vocals
- Years active: 1980–present
- Labels: Epitaph, National Trust, Restless, Triple X, Nitro, Kung Fu
- Member of: The Vandals
- Formerly of: Sweet and Tender Hooligans
- Website: www.joeescalante.com

Joseph Patrick Escalante (born January 30, 1963) is an American musician, television writer, film and television director, radio host, and former television executive. He is known professionally as the bassist and songwriter for the punk rock band The Vandals, and creator and episodic director of the paranormal travel series Monsters Across America on Fox Nation.

== Early life ==
Escalante was born the youngest of 7 children in Long Beach, California to a Mexican father and Irish mother and grew up in Rossmoor, California, an unincorporated area of Orange County. His father was a pioneer in the electric sign industry, founding Superior Signs, Intl. and designing several iconic atomic age flashing signs that have dotted prominent American city skylines. His mother worked as a bowling alley clerk in Seal Beach, California.

=== Education ===
Escalante received his Bachelor degree from UCLA studying Viking civilization under Professor Jesse Byock and his Juris Doctor from Loyola Law School. He graduated from Los Alamitos High School in the class of 1981 and was elected to the Los Alamitos High Hall of Fame in 2014. Escalante studied at the University of Iceland at Reykjavik Graduate Program in 1985.

== Career ==
=== Career with The Vandals ===
In 1981, at age 18, Escalante joined the punk rock band The Vandals, becoming their first permanent drummer, and would remain the sole constant member throughout the rest of their career. The Vandals released their debut EP Peace thru Vandalism in 1982 through Epitaph Records. In 1984 Escalante and the other band members appeared in the Roger Corman film Suburbia, directed by Penelope Spheeris and released their first album When in Rome Do as the Vandals In 1987 they appeared in another Spheeris film, Dudes. By 1989 Escalante had moved from the drums into the bass guitar position. The current iteration of singer Dave Quackenbush, guitarist Warren Fitzgerald, and drummer Josh Freese released the album Fear of a Punk Planet, establishing themselves amongst an emerging new crop of southern California punk rock bands. This lineup would remain consistent throughout the rest of the band's career and would release numerous albums and tour extensively.

=== Television career ===
After graduating law school in 1992, Escalante worked as an executive in the department of business affairs for CBS. During his time with the network, he negotiated actor, writer, and director deals on programs like Everybody Loves Raymond, Rescue 911, and Walker, Texas Ranger, for which he co-produced the theme song “Eyes of a Ranger” after convincing Chuck Norris to sing the theme song to his own series.

After four years, he left CBS to consult with the United Paramount Network, tour with The Vandals, and operate his record label Kung Fu Records where he also produced concert films and low-budget features. In 1999, one of the first streaming TV series, Fear of A Punk Planet, was ordered by the Digital Entertainment Network (DEN), and was later released as a comic book in 2017.

In 2015, Escalante was hired by the Discovery I.D./Discovery Channel to produce scripted true crime TV series True Nightmares where he wrote scripts and served as the production re-writer for the 1st and 2nd seasons. In 2017 he began working as a writer for History Channel's sci-fi documentary series Ancient Aliens. As a freelance writer, Escalante has penned scripts for such shows as Oxygen Channel's Buried in the Back Yard, Travel Channel's In Search of Monsters, and History's Curse of Oak Island.

In 2018, Escalante wrote the pilot script for the reboot of the 1960s hit TV series Hogan's Heroes for original creator and 2 time best picture winner Albert S. Ruddy, which as of 2022 is still in development with Albert S. Ruddy Productions. This time, the series is set in Guantanamo Bay.

Escalante sold the paranormal show Monsters Across America starring Kacie McDonnell to Fox Nation in 2020.

=== Nitro and Kung Fu Records ===
In 1995 the Vandals signed a record deal with Nitro Records owned by The Offspring's Dexter Holland and released the album Live Fast, Diarrhea. The album brought increased attention to the band and Escalante toured with them internationally. He directed their music video for "I Have a Date," and would continue to direct the band's videos throughout the rest of their career. The band released 3 more albums on Nitro over the next 5 years, with Escalante participating on all of them.

In 1996 Escalante and Warren Fitzgerald started the record label Kung Fu Records, initially to release a debut album by the Assorted Jelly Beans. Escalante named the label after his study of Kung Fu San Soo. Eventually, Escalante left CBS Television and took over operations of the label, signing acts such as The Ataris, Ozma, Tsunami Bomb, Kenneth Keith Kallenbach, Longmont Potion Castle, and The Vandals. Kung Fu's most successful release was Buddha, the debut album by the band Blink-182. Escalante ran the U.S. and European operations for 20 years, then sold the label to Cleopatra Records, who continue to maintain it as a separate imprint.

=== Directing and producing ===
Using his experience in the television industry, Escalante formed Kung Fu Films in 2000 as an offshoot of the record label, and produced and starred in the independent film That Darn Punk and the early streaming series Fear of a Punk Planet. He also continued to produce and direct music videos for The Vandals and for other acts on the Kung Fu label. In 2002 he launched the DVD live concert series The Show Must Go Off! for which produced and/or directed over 20 long form concert films. In 2005, he directed the independent film, shot on film, Cake Boy featuring Scott Aukerman, Warren Fitzgerald, Bob Odenkirk, Patton Oswalt, Brian Posehn, and Cherry 2000's Pamela Gidley.

=== Sweet and Tender Hooligans ===
In 2004 Escalante joined the Sweet and Tender Hooligans, a Smiths/Morrissey tribute band composed primarily of Latino members. In 2006 he traveled with them to the United Kingdom to celebrate the 20th anniversary of the Smiths album The Queen Is Dead.

=== Radio hosting ===
In 2005, Escalante was hired to host a weekly radio program originally "Barely Legal Radio" on the Los Angeles/Orange County radio station Indie 103.1 FM, where he dispensed entertainment and legal advice to aspiring musicians. In May 2006, he became the host of the station's morning drive-time program The Last of the Famous International Morning Shows, replacing Mighty Mighty Bosstones singer Dicky Barrett.

Escalante's morning show included daily appearances by film director David Lynch, who served as weatherman, and actor Timothy Olyphant, who served as a sports commentator. The show also featured a weekly wine tasting and education hour called "Wino Wednesday", and hosted a number of celebrity guests including Crispin Glover, Christina Ricci, Pat Buchanan, Will Ferrell, Maynard James Keenan, Werner Herzog, Phil Donahue, Kristen Stewart, Harry Shearer, Dennis Hopper, and Andy Dick. The show was endorsed by companies and products such as iPod, iTunes, and AT&T. Indie pulled the plug on the show in November 2008. Two months later, the entire station went off the air and switched to Spanish ranchero music.

Joe's call-in entertainment law show stayed on the web version on Indie 1031 until it finally landed on Clear Channel/Iheart Media's KEIB AM 1150 in 2009, where it can still be heard today live on Sundays at 5pm to 7pm, PST. In April 2019, the name was changed to "Joe Escalante, Live from Hollywood."

== Personal life ==
=== Marriage ===
Escalante married in 1996. His wife, Sandra Escalante, appeared briefly in the 2005 film Cake Boy which he directed. The two now live together in Seal Beach, California.

=== Family ===
Escalante's brother Greg Escalante founded Juxtapoz magazine and the Gregorio Escalante Gallery. Escalante's step brother Mike Fries is CEO and Vice Chairman of Liberty Global. Escalante's brother in law is actor/composer Paul Williams.

=== Religious and political views ===
Escalante teaches Catechism at St. Peter Chanel Catholic Church in Hawaiian Gardens where he is a daily communicant. His views have been described as conservative, although he has no stated political party affiliation.

From 2008 to 2012, Escalante worked as a volunteer temporary judge for the Los Angeles superior court, and later placed himself on the ballot for a paid position in a non-partisan race. Street artist Shepard Fairey created a campaign poster for Escalante, his first candidate poster since his iconic representation of President Barack Obama. Escalante raised $15,000 for his campaign with the posters and received 18.41% of the vote. His opponent spent a record $450,000 to defeat him.

== Discography ==
Studio albums

- 1984: When in Rome Do as the Vandals
- 1989: Slippery When Ill
- 1990: Fear of a Punk Planet
- 1995: Live Fast, Diarrhea
- 1996: The Quickening
- 1996: Oi to the World!
- 1998: Hitler Bad, Vandals Good
- 2000: Look What I Almost Stepped In...
- 2002: Internet Dating Superstuds
- 2004: Hollywood Potato Chip

== Filmography ==
=== Acting ===
Year	Title	Role
1984	Suburbia	himself (with The Vandals)
1987	Dudes	himself (with The Vandals)
2000	That Darn Punk	Dirk Castigo
2004	Punk Rock Holocaust	Warped Documentary Boss^{[I]}
2005	Cake Boy	Pierre Kaniche
2007	Punk's Not Dead	himself
2008	Lil' Bush (episode 204: "Katrina")	Michael "Brownie" Brown (voice)
2009	One Nine Nine Four	himself
2014	Comedy Bang! Bang!	himself
2016	Bar Rescue	himself; Recon spy

I Escalante's scenes in Punk Rock Holocaust were deleted from the final version of the film.

=== Direction and production ===
Year	Title	Role
1996	Glory Daze	Music supervisor
2000	That Darn Punk	Producer, music editor, music supervisor
2003	Neil Hamburger: Live at the Phoenix Greyhound Park (The Show Must Go Off! episode 5)	Director, producer
2004	Goldfinger: Live at the House of Blues (The Show Must Go Off! episode 11)	Director
2004	Zebrahead: Live at the House of Blues (The Show Must Go Off! episode 12)	Director
2004	The Matches: Live at the House of Blues (The Show Must Go Off! episode 14)	Director, producer
2004	Throw Rag: Live at the House of Blues (The Show Must Go Off! episode 15)	Director
2004	Warped Tour '03	Director, producer
2005	Tsunami Bomb: Live at the Glasshouse (The Show Must Go Off! episode 17)	Producer
2005	Cake Boy	Director, producer
