= Warren Fitzgerald =

American guitarist (born 1968)

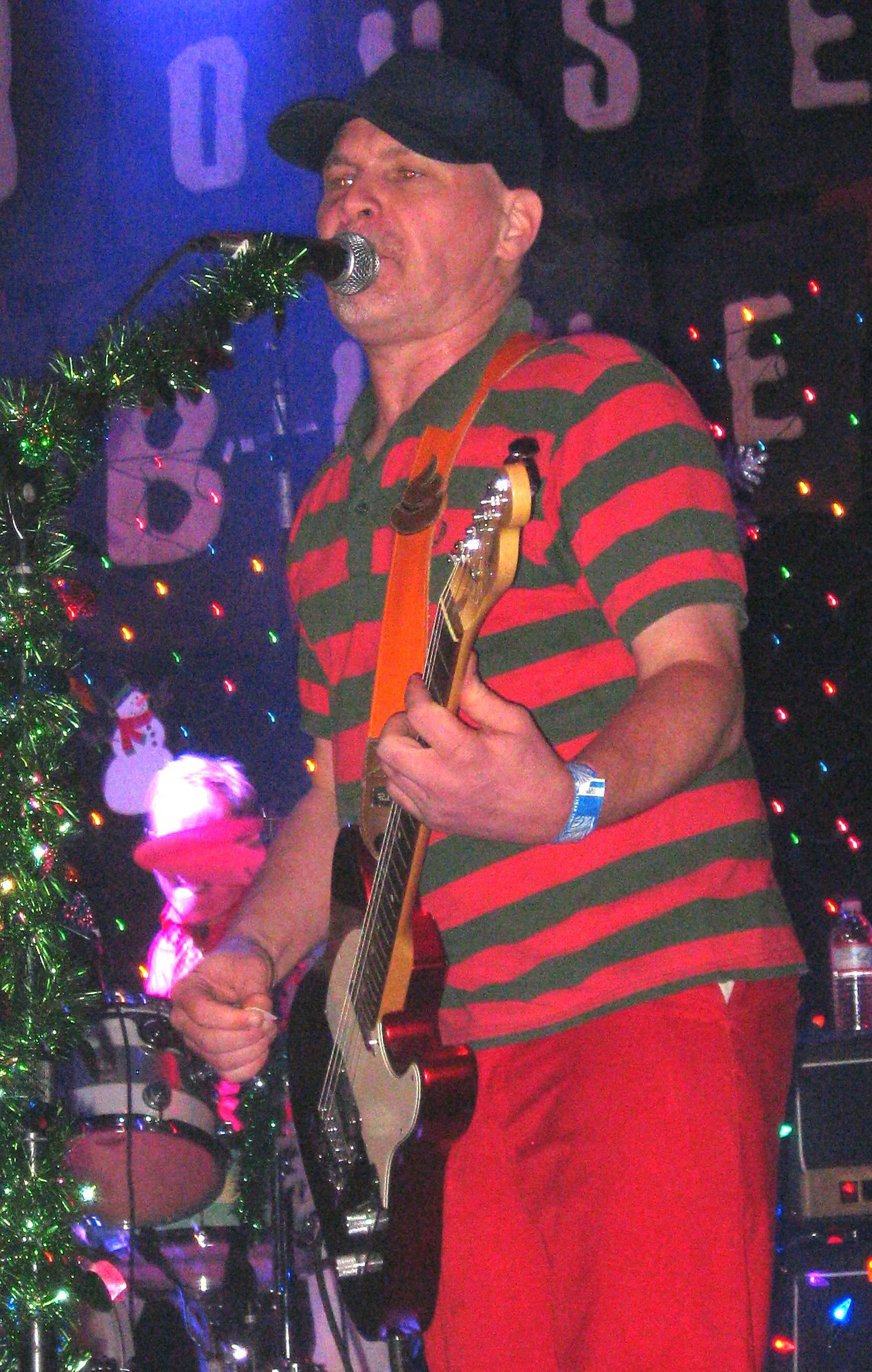
- Fitzgerald with The Vandals on December 21, 2012

Background information
- Born: September 15, 1968 (age 57)
- Origin: Newport Beach, California, U.S.
- Genres: Punk rock, pop punk, comedy rock, new wave, ska punk, hardcore punk, alternative rock
- Occupations: Musician, songwriter, record label owner
- Instruments: Guitar, vocals
- Years active: 1990–present
- Label: Kung Fu
- Member of: The Vandals
- Formerly of: Oingo Boingo; The Offspring

Warren Fitzgerald (born September 15, 1968) is an American punk rock guitarist, songwriter, and record label owner. He is best known for being the guitarist of The Vandals and Oingo Boingo. He is also co-founder of Kung Fu Records, along with his Vandals band-mate Joe Escalante.

== Early life ==
Fitzgerald attended Edison High School in Huntington Beach, California, from 1982 to 1986, with Scott Weiland (Stone Temple Pilots), Gabriel Ortiz (Serial Killer), and Amy von Freymann (MTV-Jay).

== Career ==
=== Early years ===
One of Fitzgerald's first bands was Dies Irae where he played bass with guitarist Jack Lee Galbraith (Taylor), and drummer Robert "Yoda" Hill. Later, he formed the band Totally Uncalled Four and was in a hardcore punk group called Don't No. He was also the guitarist and songwriter for Gherkin Raucous and Xtra Large.

=== The Vandals ===
Fitzgerald has been a member of The Vandals since 1989.

=== Oingo Boingo & Danny Elfman ===
In 1993, he joined Oingo Boingo as a second guitarist and performed on their final studio album and live album. After the band broke up in 1995, he jokingly said if he could get his job back at Taco Bell, where he was working 2 years prior. Fitzgerald has since worked on several projects with Danny Elfman, including his 2022 solo album Big Mess.

=== Other projects ===
Other bands Fitzgerald has worked with include Tenacious D and The Offspring on their 2008 tour.

Apart from performing as a live instrumentalist, Fitzgerald has also worked as a producer, composer and songwriter, having worked with a wide range of musicians including Dweezil Zappa. Fitzgerald produced Jughead's Revenge's 1996 album Image Is Everything. He is credited as a songwriter on the School of Rock soundtrack. He also provided string arrangements for the Alkaline Trio album Crimson and contributed guitar work to the Team America: World Police soundtrack. As of 2012, Fitzgerald is credited as a writer and composer on The Hub cable series The Aquabats! Super Show!, including a co-composing credit for the series' theme song and several onscreen appearances playing a hobo. In August 2017, Fitzgerald played guitar for Avenged Sevenfold's cover of the song "Runaway".

Outside of his music, he finds work as both a painter and a writer.
