= MxPx discography =

Discography of American punk rock band

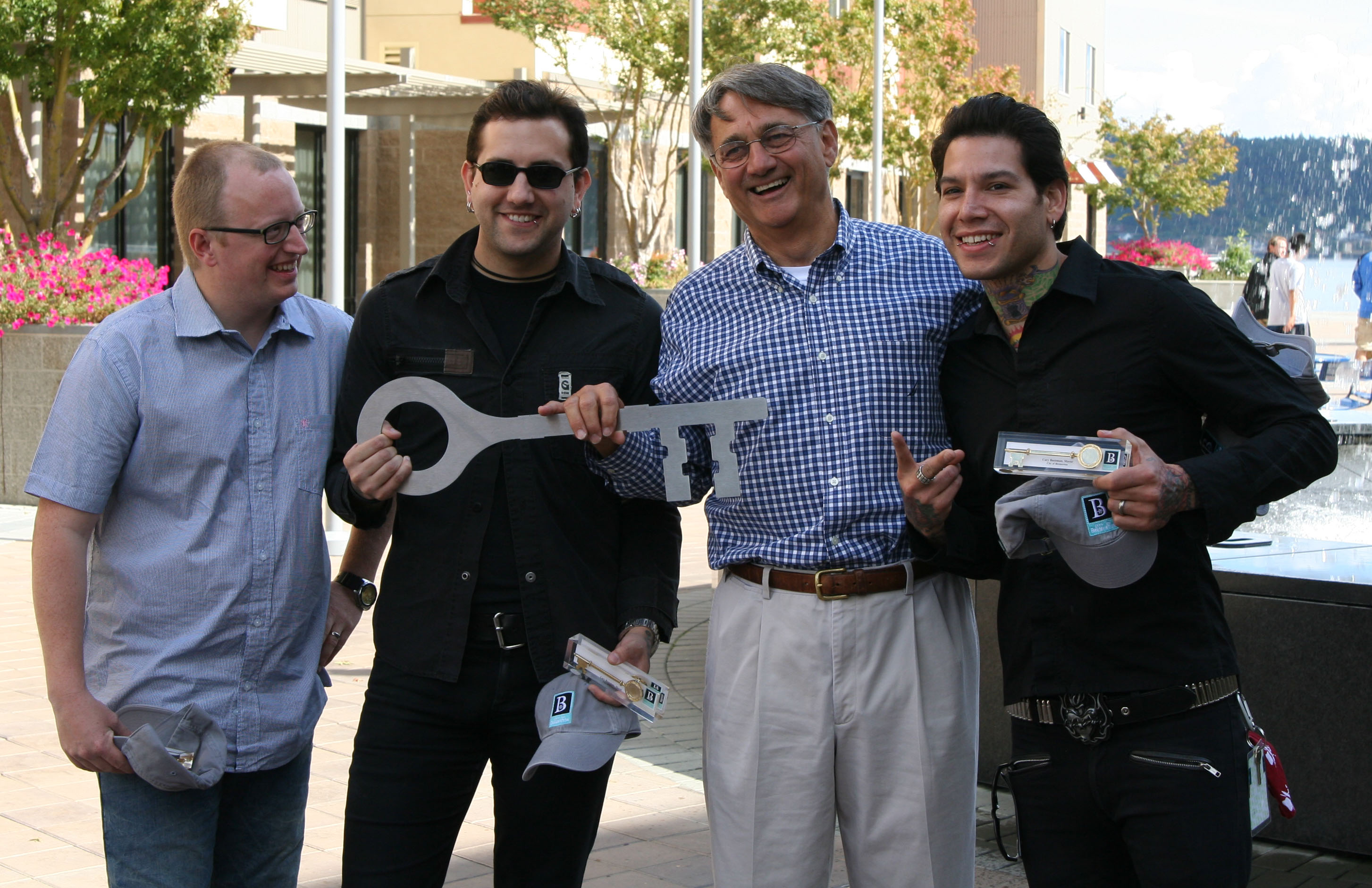
- The three members of MxPx in 2006
- Studio albums: 14
- Extended plays: 7
- Live albums: 1
- Compilation albums: 4
- Singles: 43
- Video albums: 2
- Music videos: 1+

This is a comprehensive listing of official releases by MxPx, a three-piece American punk rock band, formed in 1992 in Bremerton, Washington. The band has released 14 studio albums, 43 singles, two cover albums, two live albums, an acoustic album, and other recordings.

== Albums ==
=== Studio albums ===
Year	Album details	Chart peaks						Certifications
Year	Album details	US	US Christ.	US Indie	US Alt.	US Heat.	AUS	Certifications
1994	Pokinatcha: Released: October 26, 1994; Label: Tooth & Nail	—	—	—	—	—	—	
1995	Teenage Politics: Released: June 23, 1995; Label: Tooth & Nail	—	19	—	—	—	—	
1996	Life in General: Released: November 19, 1996; Label: Tooth & Nail	—	16	—	—	22	—	
1998	Slowly Going the Way of the Buffalo: Released: June 16, 1998; Label: A&M	99	2	—	—	—	—	RIAA: Gold
2000	The Ever Passing Moment: Released: May 16, 2000; Label: A&M	56	1	—	—	—	81	
2003	Before Everything & After: Released: September 16, 2003; Label: A&M	51	—	—	—	—	—	
2005	Panic: Released: June 7, 2005; Label: SideOneDummy	77	1	3	—	—	—	
2007	Secret Weapon: Released: July 17, 2007; Label: Tooth & Nail	76	1	—	25	—	—	
2009	On the Cover II: Released: March 24, 2009; Label: Tooth & Nail	—	—	—	—	—	—	
2009	Punk Rawk Christmas: Released: December 1, 2009; Label: Rock City Recording Company	—	—	—	—	—	—	
2012	Plans Within Plans: Released: April 3, 2012; Label: Rock City Recording Company	—	23	45	—	—	—	
2016	Life In General 2.0: Released: September 17, 2016; Label: Rock City Recording Company	—	—	—	—	—	—	
2018	MxPx: Released: July 25, 2018; Label: Independent	—	—	—	—	—	—	
2023	Find a Way Home: Released: August 25, 2023; Label: Independent	—	—	—	—	—	—	
"—" denotes a release that did not chart.

=== Live albums ===
Year	Album details	Chart peaks		RIAA certification
Year	Album details	US	US Christ	RIAA certification
1999	At the Show: Released: July 27, 1999; Label: Tooth & Nail	189	5	
2017	Left Coast Live: Released: July 6, 2017 (double vinyl); July 31, 2017 (worldwide digital release); Label: Rock City Recording Company	—	—	
2020	Life in Quarantine: Released: 2020; Label:	—	—	
2021	Southbound to San Antonio: Released: November 12, 2021 (worldwide digital), March 18, 2022 (vinyl); Label:	—	—	
"—" denotes a release that did not chart.

=== Compilation albums ===
Year	Album details	Chart peaks			RIAA certification
Year	Album details	US	US Indie	US Christ	RIAA certification
1998	Let It Happen: Released: November 10, 1998; November 21, 2006 (re-release); Label: Tooth & Nail	161	—	9	
2002	Ten Years and Running: Released: May 21, 2002; Label: Tooth & Nail	147	—	8	
2006	Let's Rock: Released: November 13, 2006; Label: SideOneDummy	—	34	—	
2008	The Ultimate Collection: Released: March 11, 2008; Label: Tooth & Nail	—	—	—	
2014	The Acoustic Collection: Released: July 6, 2014; Label: Rock City Recording Company	—	—	—	
2021	Box Set: Released: August 2021; Label:	—	—	—	
"—" denotes a release that did not chart.

=== Video albums ===
Year	Album details
2000	It Came From Bremerton (VHS): Released: 2000; Label: Universal Music & Video Distribution
2004	B-Movie: Released: 2004; Label: SideOneDummy
2009	Triple Threat: Released: March 5, 2009; Label: Rock City Recording Company
2011	Both Ends Burning: The Saga Continues... (DVD): Released: December 8, 2011; Label: Rock City Recording Company

== EPs ==
Year	EP details	Chart peaks			RIAA certification
Year	EP details	US	US Indie	US Christ	RIAA certification
1994	17: Released: 1994; Label: Tooth & Nail	—	—	—	
1995	On the Cover: Released: November 28, 1995; Label: Tooth & Nail	—	—	37	
1996	Move to Bremerton: Released: 1996; Label: Tooth & Nail	—	—	—	
1997	Small Town Minds: Released: 1997; Label: Tooth & Nail	—	—	—	
2000	The Broken Bones: Released: 2000; Label: Tooth & Nail	—	—	—	
2001	The Renaissance EP: Released: May 22, 2001; Label: Fat Wreck Chords	128	3	6	
2001	Fat Club 7": Released: 2001; Label: Fat Wreck Chords	—	—	—	
2004	The AC/EP: Released: 2004; Label: SideOneDummy	—	—	—	
2009	Left Coast Punk EP: Released: November 17, 2009; Label: Rock City Recording Company	—	—	—	
2018	Best Life: Released: October 12, 2018; Label: Self-Released	—	—	—	

== Songs ==
=== Singles ===
Year	Title	Peak chart positions		Album
Year	Title	US Alt.	AUS	Album
1994	"Want Ad"	—	—	Pokinatcha
1995	"Teenage Politics"	—	—	Teenage Politics
1995	"Punk Rawk Show"	—	—	Teenage Politics
1996	"Money Tree"	—	—	Teenage Politics
1997	"Doing Time"	—	—	Life in General
1997	"Move to Bremerton"	—	—	Life in General
1998	"Chick Magnet"	—	—	Life in General
1998	"I'm OK, You're OK"	—	—	Slowly Going the Way of the Buffalo
2000	"Responsibility"	24	70	The Ever Passing Moment
2002	"My Mistake"	—	—	Ten Years and Running
2003	"Everything Sucks (When You're Gone)"	—	—	Before Everything & After
2004	"Grey Skies Turn Blue"	—	—	The AC/EP
2005	"Heard That Sound"	—	—	Panic
2005	"Wrecking Hotel Rooms"	—	—	Panic
2006	"Breathe Deep"	—	—	Let's Rock
2006	"Running out of Time"	—	—	Let's Rock
2006	"Role Remodeling"	—	—	Let It Happen - Deluxe Edition
2007	"Secret Weapon"	—	—	Secret Weapon
2007	"You're On Fire"	—	—	Secret Weapon
2007	"Shut It Down"	—	—	Secret Weapon
2008	"Contention"	—	—	Secret Weapon
2009	"End"	—	—	Left Coast Punk EP
2012	"Far Away"	—	—	Plans Within Plans
2016	"Calm My Craze"	—	—	Non-album single
2016	"They"	—	—	Non-album single
2016	"Another Christmas"	—	—	Non-album single
2018	"Let's Ride"	—	—	MxPx
2018	"Rolling Strong"	—	—	MxPx
2019	"San Dimas High School Football Rules"	—	—	Non-album single
2019	"Heard That Sound" (w/ Five Iron Frenzy)	—	—	Non-album single
2019	"Franco Un-American"	—	—	Non-album single
2020	"Salt Lake City" (w/ Bad Cop, Bad Cop)	—	—	Non-album single
2020	"Worries"	—	—	Non-album single
2020	"Fever Dream"	—	—	Non-album single
2021	"Can't Keep Waiting"	—	—	Non-album single
2021	"Say Yes" (w/ Rivals)	—	—	Non-album single
2021	"Hold Your Tongue And Say Apple"	—	—	Non-album single
2022	"Unstoppable"	—	—	Non-album single
2023	"Stay Up All Night"	—	—	Find a Way Home
2023	"Cautious Optimistic"	—	—	Find a Way Home
2023	"Not Today"	—	—	Find a Way Home
2023	"Call Me"	—	—	Find a Way Home
2023	"What I Tell Myself"	—	—	Find a Way Home
"—" denotes a release that did not chart.

=== Compilation appearances ===
- "I Can Be Friends with You" (1996) from Never Say Dinosaur, a tribute album to the contemporary Christian rock band Petra
- "Scooby-Doo, Where Are You?" (2002) from the Scooby Doo movie soundtrack
- "Shout" (2003) cover song and music video as part of the release of the Double Secret Probation Edition of Animal House.
- "Christmas Night of the Living Dead" (2003) from A Santa Cause: It's A Punk Rock Christmas
- "The Empire" (2004) co-written by Mark Hoppus for The Passion of the Christ soundtrack
- "The Setting Sun" (2006) for the 3D Realms first person shooter Prey.
- "Hey Porter" was covered for All Aboard: A Tribute to Johnny Cash in 2008.
- "Thank You Billy Graham" collaborative tribute song, album, and video documentary, respectively. Commemorating the life's work of Billy Graham.
