= Ten Years and Running =

Compilation album by MxPx
- Released: May 21, 2002
- Recorded: Tracks 4–19: 1994 – 2001; Tracks 1–3: February 28 – March 2, 2002
- Genres: Punk rock, skate punk, hardcore punk
- Length: 46:16
- Label: Tooth & Nail
- Producers: Stephen Egerton; Jerry Finn; Steve Kravac; Bob Moon; MxPx; Aaron Sprinkle; Bill Stevenson

MxPx chronology
The Renaissance EP (2001)	Ten Years and Running (2002)	Before Everything & After (2003)

Professional ratings
Review scores
Source	Rating
AllMusic	4/5 stars
Alternative Press	7/10

Ten Years and Running is a compilation album by American punk rock band MxPx, released on May 21, 2002, on Tooth and Nail Records, the album consists of nineteen songs spanning MxPx's career, mostly from Tooth and Nail releases but including a song each from the A&M releases Slowly Going the Way of the Buffalo, The Ever Passing Moment, The Broken Bones, and Fat Wreck Chords' The Renaissance EP. The band self-produced a re-recording of "Punk Rawk Show" and two new songs, "My Mistake" and "Running Away," for the compilation. A music video was made for "My Mistake." Tim Palmer either mixed or remixed all of the songs except "My Life Story" and "The Broken Bones."

The album is not a greatest hits album, as it omits MxPx' more well-known singles "Responsibility" and "I'm OK, You're OK," but is considered a retrospective of the first ten years of the band. The booklet accompanying the CD features many previously unreleased photographs of the band and a detailed timeline of moments in their career.

== Track listing ==
1. "Punk Rawk Show" - 2:26
2. "My Mistake" - 2:06
3. "Running Away" - 2:37
4. "Chick Magnet" - 3:12
5. "Want Ad" - 1:24
6. "Tomorrow's Another Day" - 2:47
7. "Doing Time" - 1:24
8. "The Broken Bones" - 2:12
9. "My Life Story" - 2:43
10. "Teenage Politics" - 2:50
11. "PxPx" - 1:08
12. "GSF" - 2:33
13. "Do Your Feet Hurt?" - 3:10
14. "Let It Happen" - 2:44
15. "Lonesome Town" - 2:32
16. "Dolores" - 1:29
17. "Rock & Roll Girl" - 2:06
18. "Move to Bremerton" - 3:25
19. "Middlename (Live version)" - 3:29

== Personnel ==
- Mike Herrera - Bass, Vocals
- Tom Wisniewski - Lead Guitar
- Andy Husted - Lead Guitar ("Want Ad", PxPx")
- Yuri Ruley - Drums
- Mixed by Tim Palmer
