= B-Movie (video) =

2004 DVD by MxPx

Video by MxPx
- Released: 2004
- Genre: Punk rock, pop punk
- Length: 46:47 (DVD), 14:42 (EP)
- Label: SideOneDummy
- Producer: MxPx

MxPx chronology
Before Everything & After (2003)	B-Movie (2004)	Panic (2005)

Professional ratings
Review scores
Source	Rating
Punknews.org	0.5/5 stars

B-Movie is a DVD released by MxPx in 2004. It is a combination of live concert footage and a documentary of the band. The concert footage is culled from a three-night stint in late 2003 at El Corazon in Seattle (at the time, still called The Graceland). It also features a five-track acoustic EP called The AC/EP.

== DVD ==
Although the band recorded three full nights of shows for the DVD, only 5 song performances actually appear on the DVD. The remainder of the film is interviews with the band and backstage footage.

=== Chapters ===
1. "Go Already" [1:16] - An introduction with an unreleased song by MxPx.
2. "Well Adjusted" [4:12] - MxPx plays the song "Well Adjusted", from their album Before Everything & After, after which there is a short clip of the band playing the song acoustically, with Tom Wisniewski's mother singing along.
3. "Closer than Brothers" [3:11] - The band members argue over who is the "mom", "dad", and "kid" of the band.
4. "Mike's Face for Prez" [:36] - The band talks about their fans. One fan wants Mike's face for President.
5. "I Hate You MxPx" [1:47] - The band talks about the criticism they've received.
6. "Pokinatcha Punx (Feat. Andy Husted & The Song Destroyers)" [1:11] - The band plays their song "PxPx" from their debut album Pokinatcha with Andy Husted, the original guitarist of MxPx, who left after their debut album and was replaced by Tom Wisniewski.
7. "Acousticness" [3:33] - The band describes the how and why of their acoustic EP, The AC/EP. This includes footage from inside the recording studio.
8. "Skate Jam '73" [2:07] - The band talks about a reunion party at a skating rink, where everyone dressed with apparel from the 1970s.
9. "Tomorrow's Another Day" [5:42] - The band plays their song "Tomorrow's Another Day", which comes off their gold album Slowly Going the Way of the Buffalo.
10. "I'm Calling From My Banana" [4:15] - The band talks about their experiences in Japan while on tour.
11. "Summers in Brugge" [3:46] - The band talks about their experiences in Bruges (Brugge) while on tour, and Yuri cut his hand while breaking a beer bottle.
12. "MxPx Bare All" [2:53] - A humorous segment where the band members are silhouetted, and they become "open" and "honest"; however, instead of being truly honest, the band members say untrue things in order to be funny.
13. "Let It Happen" [2:56] - The band plays an acoustic version of their song "Let It Happen", from their album Let It Happen with Yuri, who normally plays the drums, playing the acoustic guitar.
14. "The Bass Toss Heard 'Round the World" [1:08] - The band talks about how Mike tosses his bass guitar to his bass tech while the bass tech tosses another bass to Mike at the same time on stage and mentions a mishap that occurred one time while they were doing this.
15. "Several Fun Ways to Fight Boredom" [3:12] - The band talks about the numerous pranks that they performed while bored on tour; Mike gives Tom a "purple nurple" while he is sleeping, and Tom promises revenge.
16. "Mike and His Sensitive Side" [1:35] - A humorous scene where Mike is sad because the other band members think he doesn't do anything right.
17. "Responsibility" [3:02] - The band plays their song "Responsibility", which was the single for their album The Ever Passing Moment.
18. "Sweet Revenge" [:15] - Tom finally gets his revenge on Mike by throwing flour in his face while he was sleeping.

== AC/EP ==
The AC/EP is an audio CD accompanying the B-Movie DVD, recorded at a studio built by MxPx named The Clubhouse and mixed by producer Ted Hutt. This extended play is the only MxPx release to feature only acoustic recordings. The AC/EP is also available alone for download and/or streaming from several music download sites.

=== Track listing ===
1. "Grey Skies Turn Blue" - MxPx released this song as an electric version a year later on their album, Panic.
2. "Silver Screen" - This is a previously unreleased track that Mike wrote just for this EP.
3. "Invitation To Understanding" - This song was previously featured on their 1998 album, Slowly Going the Way of the Buffalo. The acoustic version is accompanied by a violin. This particular song required a dramatic shift in style from its original version.
4. "Where Will We Go?" - This song was previously released on the MxPx VHS It Came From Bremerton and to the MxPx fan club but unreleased to the general public.
5. "Quit Your Life" - This song is found on the album of the preceding year, titled Before Everything & After.

== Credits ==
- Mike Herrera – vocals, Bass, Acoustic Guitar, Piano
- Tom Wisniewski – Acoustic Guitar
- Yuri Ruley – drums, percussion
- Produced and Engineered by MxPx
- Recorded at The Clubhouse, Bremerton, Washington
- Studio Assistant – Scott Rohwein
- Mixed by Ted Hutt and Ken Sluiter
- Mastering by Eddie Schreyer at Oasis Mastering, Los Angeles, California
- Written by Mike Herrera
- Artwork by Andy Lenoski
- All songs written by Mike Herrera and arranged by MxPx

=== Additional musicians ===
- Seth Roberts – backing vocals on "Invitation To Understanding"
- Ami Tricoli – Violin on "Invitation To Understanding"
- Daren Challman – Keyboard on "Silver Screen"
- Stefanie Fife – Cello on "Invitation To Understanding"
