= At the Show =

Live album by MxPx
- Released: July 27, 1999
- Recorded: August 24–25, 1998
- Venue: 930 Club (Washington, D.C.); The TLA (Philadelphia)
- Genre: Skate punk; punk rock; hardcore punk; pop punk
- Length: 48:43
- Label: Tooth & Nail
- Producer: Stephen Egerton, Bill Stevenson

MxPx chronology
Let It Happen (1998)	At the Show (1999)	The Ever Passing Moment (2000)

Professional ratings
Review scores
Source	Rating
Allmusic	3.5/5 stars
HM Magazine	(not rated)

At the Show is a live album recorded by American punk rock MxPx live at the 9:30 Club in Washington, D.C., on August 24, 1998, and The TLA in Philadelphia, PA on August 25, 1998, while the band was touring in support of their latest album, 1998's Slowly Going the Way of the Buffalo as well as the B-sides collection Let it Happen, also released in 1998. At the Show was released on July 27, 1999.

== Track listing ==
No.	Title	Album	Length
1.	"Tomorrow's Another Day"	Slowly Going the Way of the Buffalo	3:09
2.	"Sometimes You Have to Ask Yourself"	Life In General	2:37
3.	"Under Lock and Key"	Slowly Going the Way of the Buffalo	2:22
4.	"Chick Magnet"	Life In General	3:08
5.	"G.S.F."	Let It Happen	2:37
6.	"Cold and All Alone"	Slowly Going the Way of the Buffalo	2:00
7.	"Party, My House, Be There"	Slowly Going the Way of the Buffalo	2:17
8.	"Downfall of Western Civilization"	Slowly Going the Way of the Buffalo	2:30
9.	"Time Brings Change"	Pokinatcha	2:09
10.	"Fist Vs. Tact"	Slowly Going the Way of the Buffalo	1:10
11.	"Small Town Minds"	Let It Happen	1:06
12.	"Walking Bye"	Pokinatcha	1:20
13.	"The KKK Took My Baby Away" (Christian retailers sell the album without this track.)	The Ramones cover
14.	"Andrea"	Life In General	1:47
15.	"Want Ad"	Pokinatcha	1:41
16.	"Lifetime Enlightenment" (Contains a sample of Deep Purple's Smoke on the Water)	Let It Happen	1:03
17.	"Forgive and Forget"	Previously unreleased	0:29
18.	"Invitation to Understanding"	Slowly Going the Way of the Buffalo	2:19
19.	"Dolores"	Teenage Politics	1:11
20.	"Middlename"	Life In General	3:13
21.	"I'm OK, You're OK"	Slowly Going the Way of the Buffalo	2:34
22.	"The Theme Fiasco"	Slowly Going the Way of the Buffalo	2:20
23.	"Punk Rawk Show"	Teenage Politics	3:59
Total length:			48:43

== Personnel ==
Band

- Mike Herrera - bass, vocals
- Tom Wisniewski - guitars
- Yuri Ruley - drums
