= Let It Happen (MxPx album) =

Compilation album by MxPx
- Released: November 10, 1998
- Genre: Skate punk; melodic hardcore
- Length: 71:44
- Label: Tooth & Nail
- Producer: Steve Kravac; Bob Moon

MxPx chronology
Slowly Going the Way of the Buffalo (1998)	Let It Happen (1998)	At the Show (1999)

Alternative cover
- Deluxe edition re-release cover

Professional ratings
Review scores
Source	Rating
AllMusic	4/5 stars
HM	(not rated)
Melodic	2/5 stars
NeuFutur	7/10 stars
Punknews.org	3.5/5 stars

Let It Happen is a B-sides and rarities album by American punk rock band MxPx, released on November 10, 1998.

== Contents ==
The songs on this compilation originally appeared on the 17 7-inch, Punk Rawk Show 7-inch, Small Town Minds 7-inch, North American Punk Series Vol. 4 split 7-inch with the McCrackins, I'm Your Biggest Fan vol. 1 compilation, On the Cover double 10-inch, Teenage Politics, Move to Bremerton EP, and Life In General pre-release teaser. Five of the songs had not been previously released: "Easier Said Than Done", "Important Enough to Mention", "Honest Answers", "Late Last Night" and "Biased Bigotry". The sound clip at the beginning of this version of "Chick Magnet" is from the film Mallrats. The songs were all originally produced by either Bob Moon or Aaron Sprinkle. Steve Kravac served as producer for the compilation and provided remixes.

== Release ==
Let It Happen was released on November 10, 1998, through Tooth & Nail Records.

On November 7, 2006, it was announced the group had re-signed with Tooth & Nail Records. In the same announcement, it was revealed that Let It Happen would be re-released on November 21. This deluxe edition included six different tracks, with three new songs produced by Aaron Sprinkle, and also three original demos of songs that were re-recorded for the first album, Pokinatcha. To make room, the final six songs from the original Let It Happen were taken off. The deluxe edition also includes a DVD with twelve music videos.

== Track listings ==
Except for song no. 4 and 5, all songs written by Mike Herrera.

=== Original release ===
1. "Never Learn" (from On the Cover EP, 1996)
2. "Begin to Start" (from On the Cover EP, 1996)
3. "Swing Set Girl" (from On the Cover EP, 1996)
4. "Sick Boy" (Social Distortion cover) (from On the Cover EP, 1996)
5. "Oh Donna" (Ritchie Valens cover) (from On the Cover EP, 1996)
6. "Small Town Minds" (from Small Town Minds EP, 1997)
7. "First Class Mail" (from Small Town Minds EP, 1997)
8. "Can't See Not Saying" (from Small Town Minds EP, 1997)
9. "GSF" (from Small Town Minds EP, 1997)
10. "Thoughts and Ideas" (from Small Town Minds EP, 1997)
11. "Easier Said than Done" (from Move to Bremerton EP, 1996)
12. "Rock and Roll Girl" (from Move to Bremerton EP, 1996)
13. "Important Enough to Mention"
14. "Elvis is Dead" (from North America Loud Punk Series, Vol. 4 split 7", 1997)
15. "Lifetime Enlightenment" (from I'm Your Biggest Fan compilation, 1996)
16. "Let it Happen" (from Punk Rawk Show EP, 1995)
17. "Hot and Cold" (from Punk Rawk Show EP, 1995)
18. "So Kill Me" (from Punk Rawk Show EP, 1995)
19. "Suggestion Box" (from 17 EP, 1994)
20. "Creation" (from 17 EP, 1994)
21. "Want Ad" (from Teenage Politics LP)
22. "Honest Answers"
23. "Late Last Night"
24. "Biased Bigotry"
25. "Circumstance" (from Move to Bremerton EP, 1996)
26. "Do Your Feet Hurt?" (critter version) (from Life in General pre-release teaser, 1996)
27. "Move to Bremerton" (extended version) (from Life in General pre-release teaser, 1996)
28. "Chick Magnet" (demo version) (from Life in General pre-release teaser, 1996)
29. "Sorry So Sorry" (demo version) (from Life in General pre-release teaser, 1996)
30. "Christalena" (demo version) (from Life in General pre-release teaser, 1996)
31. "South Bound" (demo version) (from Life in General pre-release teaser, 1996)
32. "Life in General" (demo version) (from Life in General pre-release teaser, 1996)

=== Deluxe edition ===
CD

1. "Role Remodeling" (new)
2. "Prozac" (new)
3. "Your Turn" (new)
4. "Never Learn"
5. "Begin to Start"
6. "Swing Set Girl"
7. "Sick Boy"
8. "Oh Donna"
9. "Small Town Minds"
10. "First Class Mail"
11. "Can't See Not Saying"
12. "GSF"
13. "Thoughts and Ideas"
14. "Easier Said than Done"
15. "Rock and Roll Girl"
16. "Important Enough to Mention"
17. "Elvis is Dead"
18. "Lifetime Enlightenment"
19. "Let it Happen"
20. "Hot and Cold"
21. "So Kill Me"
22. "Suggestion Box"
23. "Creation"
24. "Want Ad" (alternate version)
25. "Honest Answers"
26. "Late Last Night"
27. "Biased Bigotry"
28. "Circumstance"
29. "Do Your Feet Hurt?" (critter version)
30. "Twisted Words" (original demo)
31. "Suggestion Box" (original demo)
32. "Too Much Thinking" (original demo)

DVD

1. "Money Tree"
2. "Doing Time"
3. "Move to Bremerton"
4. "Chick Magnet"
5. "Punk Rawk Show"
6. "Want Ad"
7. "Teenage Politics"
8. "Responsibility"
9. "I'm OK, You're OK"
10. "Heard That Sound"
11. "Wrecking Hotel Rooms"
12. "Grey Skies Turn Blue"

== Personnel ==
- Mike Herrera - bass, vocals
- Tom Wisniewski - guitars
- Yuri Ruley - drums
