= List of skate punk bands =

This is a list of skate punk bands. Skate punk is a subgenre of punk rock associated with skater subculture.

- 88 Fingers Louie
- Agression
- Bad Religion
- Belvedere
- Big Boys
- Bigwig
- Blink-182
- Bloody Knees
- Cardiel
- Cerebral Ballzy
- Charlie Brown Jr.
- Consumed
- Cryptic Slaughter
- The Decline
- Drunk Injuns
- Excel
- Face to Face
- The Faction
- FIDLAR
- Frenzal Rhomb
- Gang Green
- Goldfinger
- Good Riddance
- Guttermouth
- Hogan's Heroes
- JFA
- Jughead's Revenge
- Lagwagon
- Millencolin
- Much the Same
- MxPx
- NOFX
- No Use for a Name
- The Offspring
- Pennywise
- Phinius Gage
- Propagandhi
- Pulley
- RKL
- Screeching Weasel
- Slick Shoes
- Strung Out
- Suicidal Tendencies
- The Suicide Machines
- Sum 41
- Tales of Terror
- Ten Foot Pole
- Trash Boat
- Trash Talk
- Unwritten Law
- Useless ID
- The Vandals
