= Neil Hundt =

Neil Alexander Hundt is the bass guitarist for Arthur, a side project of MxPx. Hundt is credited with being the drum technician for Yuri Ruley on MxPx album The Everpassing Moment. A year later, in 2001, he provided vocals for the songs "Party II," "Time Will Tell," and "Yuri Wakes Up Screaming" on The Renaissance EP.
