= Let's Rock (disambiguation) =

Let's Rock is a 1958 American film starring Julius La Rosa.

Let's Rock may also refer to:

- Let's Rock (MxPx album), 2006
- Let's Rock (The Black Keys album), 2019
- "Let's Rock" (song), a 2001 song by E-Trax
- "Let's Rock", a 1997 song by Smash Mouth from the album Fush Yu Mang
- "Let's Rock", a 2011 song by Status Quo from the album Quid Pro Quo
