= Hopeless Case =

Hopeless Case may refer to:

- A Hopeless Case, a 1939 German film directed by Erich Engel
- "Hopeless Case", a song by Less Than Jake from their 2006 album In with the Out Crowd
- "Hopeless Case", a song by MxPx from their 2009 EP Left Coast Punk EP
- "Hopeless Case", a song by Roam from their 2016 album Backbone
