= Loneliness Is Bliss =

EP by Arthur
- Released: November 30, 1999
- Recorded: Bear Creek Studios in Woodinville, Washington
- Genre: Rock
- Length: 19:40
- Label: Rock City

Professional ratings
Review scores
Source	Rating
Allmusic	link
Kerrang!	2/5 stars

Loneliness Is Bliss is an EP by Arthur, a side project of MxPx. It was released on November 30, 1999 on Rock City Recording Company, a label owned and operated by MxPx.

== Track listing ==
All songs written by Mike Herrera and arranged by Arthur.

1. "Thought a Lot"
2. "Self Evaluation"
3. "Birthday Party"
4. "Friday, April 6th"
5. "All My Life"
6. "Amazingly True"

== Personnel ==
- Mike Herrera (listed as Arthur) – guitar, vocals
- Tom Wisniewski (listed as Edmund) – guitar
- Neil Hundt (listed as Alexander) – bass
- Yuri Ruley (listed as Zane) – drums
- Steve Kravac – recording, mixing
- Andrea Jennings – equip photos, layout
