= Punk Rawk Christmas =

Studio album by MxPx
- Released: December 1, 2009
- Genre: Christian punk; skate punk; holiday music; pop punk; melodic hardcore
- Label: Rock City Recording Company

MxPx chronology
On the Cover II (2009)	Punk Rawk Christmas (2009)	Plans Within Plans (2012)

Punk Rawk Christmas is a Christmas compilation studio album by American rock band MxPx released on December 1, 2009. The album contains 10 tracks originally recorded and released each year from 1998 to 2008 and sent to MxPx's fan club members as CD singles and later as digital downloads. The album contains some previously released holiday music as well as four previously unreleased tracks that were collected following fan requests to release the material in a collection.

== Release and promotion ==
In 2009, following ten years of limited edition Christmas-themed singles and digital downloads, MxPx collected all their previous holiday material into the compilation Punk Rawk Christmas through the band's own record label Rock City Recording Company. This version of the record was released on CD and sold through Amazon as well as the band's official website. It was also made available on digital download platforms and later digital streaming platforms. Simultaneously, a limited edition 7-inch record was released under the same title, featuring two songs from the CD and two demo versions exclusive to the seven-inch.

Shortly after the album's release Mike Herrera spoke with Alternative Press and explained the song "Christmas Night of the Living Dead" was re-titled, against his knowledge, to "Christmas Night of Zombies" when it originally appeared on the 2003 A Santa Cause compilation.

In December 2018, MxPx released a new Christmas song titled "December" and concurrently removed the full length version of the Punk Rawk Christmas album from digital platforms, replacing it with an EP of the same title. This EP features December and only five other tracks found on full length version of Punk Rawk Christmas.

A music video for the song Gimme Christmas was directed by Mark Nash and Chris Craryand. It was released on YouTube on December 5, 2007 when Gimme Christmas was original released as a single.

== Track listing ==
All tracks are written by Mike Herrera, expect Auld Lang Syne (Traditional).

Green version
No.	Title	Recording date and location	Length
1.	"Punk Rawk Christmas" (previously unreleased)	2009; Monkey Trench Studios, Bremerton, WA	3:21
2.	"Christmas Day" (previously released on Happy Christmas Vol. 2)	1998; Bear Creek Studios, Woodinville, WA	2:59
3.	"Christmas Only Comes Once a Year" (previously released on Christmas Only Comes Once a Year, CD single)	1999; Bear Creek Studios, Woodinville, WA	2:29
4.	"Coming Home for Christmas" (previously released on Coming Home For Christmas , CD single)	2000; The Clubhouse, Bremerton, WA	4:49
5.	"You're the Only One I Miss (This Christmas)" (previously released on You're the Only One I Miss (This Christmas), CD single)	2001; The Clubhouse, Bremerton, WA	2:50
6.	"Christmas Party" (previously released on Christmas Party , CD single)	2002; El Dorado Studios, North Hollywood, CA	3:46
7.	"Christmas Night of the Living Dead" (previously released on A Santa Cause: It's a Punk Rock Christmas)	2002; El Dorado Studios, North Hollywood, CA	2:22
8.	"So This Is Christmas" (previously released on So This Is Christmas, CD single)	2003; The Clubhouse, Bremerton, WA	2:14
9.	"It's Christmas and I'm Sick" (previously released on It's Christmas and I'm Sick, digital single)	2004; The Clubhouse, Bremerton, WA	2:41
10.	"2005" (from 2005, digital single)	2005; The Clubhouse, Bremerton, WA	3:16
11.	"Late Great Snowball Fight of 2006" (previously released on Late Great Snowball Fight of 2006, digital single)	2006; The Clubhouse, Bremerton, WA	2:39
12.	"Gimme Christmas" (previously released on Gimme Christmas, digital single)	2007; The Clubhouse, Bremerton, WA	2:31
13.	"Another Song About Christmas" (previously released on Another Song About Christmas, digital single)	2008; Monkey Trench Studios, Bremerton, WA	3:05
14.	"Coal" (previously unreleased)	2009; Monkey Trench Studios, Bremerton, WA	2:17
15.	"Auld Lang Syne" (previously unreleased)	2009; Monkey Trench Studios, Bremerton, WA	1:36
16.	"Questions"	2009; Monkey Trench Studios, Bremerton, WA	1:20
164.	Untitled (previously unreleased)

=== Notes ===
- The digital only "Red" version omits the tracks "Coal" and "Questions."

7-inch limited edition
No.	Title	Length
1.	"Punk Rawk Christmas"	3:21
2.	"Christmas Day"	2:59
3.	"Punk Rawk Christmas (acoustic demo)"	3:05
4.	"Christmas Day (acoustic demo)"	2:57

2018 Punk Rawk Christmas EP
No.	Title	Length
1.	"Punk Rawk Christmas"	3:21
2.	"December"	2:27
3.	"Christmas Day"	2:57
4.	"You're the One I Miss"	2:49
5.	"Late Great Snowball Fight of 2006"	2:39
6.	"Another Christmas"	3:40

== Personnel ==
Adapted from Punk Rawk Christmas's liner notes.

All tracks are produced and engineered by MxPx, except where noted.

MxPx

- Mike Herrera – bass guitar, lead vocals
- Tom Wisniewski – guitar, backing vocals
- Yuri Ruley – drums, percussion

Additional musicians

- Jack Paker – guitar solo on "Auld Lang Syne"
- Pierre Bouvier – lead vocals on "December"
- Emily Whitehurst – lead vocals on "December"
- Holli Herrera – additional vocals on "Punk Rawk Christmas"
- Cally Robinson – additional vocals on "Punk Rawk Christmas"
- Winter Niemeyer – additional vocals on "Punk Rawk Christmas"
- Alicia Bennet – additional vocals on "Punk Rawk Christmas"
- John Moreland – additional vocals on "Punk Rawk Christmas"
- Wayne Wedge – additional vocals on "Punk Rawk Christmas"
- Mike Williams – additional vocals on "Punk Rawk Christmas"
- Steve Walden – additional vocals on "Punk Rawk Christmas"
- Jeff Turner – additional vocals on "So This is Christmas"
- Jake Turner – additional vocals on "So This is Christmas"
- Oliver Peck – additional vocals on "Auld Lang Syne"
- Mike Moen – additional vocals on "Auld Lang Syne"
- Ryan Mattes – additional vocals on "Auld Lang Syne"

Artwork

- Joe Hamming & Michelle Herrera – cover design
- Joe Hamming, Gabe Connor & Jered Scott – layout
- Jered Scott – photography

Production

- Stephen Egerton – mastering on all tracks and mixing on "Punk Rawk Christmas"
- Steve Kravac – production & engineering on "Christmas Day" and "Christmas Only Comes Once a Year"
- Mike Herrera – production & engineering on "Punk Rawk Christmas," "Coal," and "Questions" and mixing on "It's Christmas and I'm Sick," "2005," "Gimee Christmas," "Another Christmas," "Coal," "Auld Lang Syne," and "Questions"
- Jack Joseph Puig – mixing on "Another Song About Christmas"
- Jack Joseph Puig – mixing on "You're the One I Miss"
- Annette Cisnero – engineering & mixing on "Christmas Party"
- Russ-T – engineering & mixing on "Christmas Night of the Living Dead"
