= Plans Within Plans =

Studio album by MxPx
- Released: April 3, 2012
- Recorded: July–December 2011
- Genre: Punk rock, skate punk
- Length: 35:18
- Label: Rock City
- Producer: MxPx

MxPx chronology
Punk Rawk Christmas (2009)	Plans Within Plans (2012)	MxPx (2018)

Singles from Plans Within Plans
- 1. "Far Away" Released: 2012; 2. "Aces Up" Released: 2012

Professional ratings
Review scores
Source	Rating
AllMusic	3.5/5 stars

Plans Within Plans is the ninth studio album by American punk rock band MxPx, which was released on April 3, 2012. It is their first original album since 2007's Secret Weapon. The album was released on MxPx's own label, Rock City Recording Company, as well as a few others in various countries including Bullion Records in Japan, Flix Records in Europe and the UK, and El Shaddai Records in Australia and New Zealand. Plans Within Plans was written, recorded, and produced by the band.

== Title meaning ==
Vocalist and bassist Mike Herrera said that the album's title related to the mayhem around writing new songs, recording them and doing all of the booking and performing concert tours.

== Track listing ==
All tracks are written by Mike Herrera

No.	Title	Length
1.	"Aces Up"	2:27
2.	"Screw Loose"	1:07
3.	"Nothing Left"	2:50
4.	"The Times"	2:55
5.	"In the Past"	2:29
6.	"Best of Times"	3:27
7.	"Stay On Your Feet"	3:11
8.	"Lucky Guy"	2:46
9.	"Far Away"	3:04
10.	"Cast Down My Heart"	2:11
11.	"When It Comes to You"	3:19
12.	"Inside Out"	2:52
13.	"Nothing's Gonna Change"	2:40
Total length:		35:18

== Personnel ==
- Mike Herrera — bass, lead vocals
- Tom Wisniewski — guitar, backing vocals
- Yuri Ruley — drums, percussion
