= The Renaissance EP =

EP by MxPx
- Released: May 22, 2001
- Recorded: January 2001
- Genre: Pop punk, punk rock
- Length: 18:05
- Label: Fat Wreck Chords
- Producer: Yuri Ruley, Tom Wisniewski

MxPx chronology
The Ever Passing Moment (2000)	The Renaissance EP (2001)	Ten Years and Running (2002)

The Renaissance EP is an EP by American punk rock band MxPx, released on May 22, 2001.

Professional ratings
Review scores
Source	Rating
AllMusic	2/5 stars
Ox-Fanzine	Unfavorable

== Track listing ==
No.	Title	Length
1.	"Lonesome Town"	2:19
2.	"Letting Go"	2:21
3.	"Party II (Time to Go)"	2:18
4.	"Time Will Tell"	1:28
5.	"The Opposite"	1:43
6.	"Don't Look Back"	2:38
7.	"Talk of the Town"	1:42
8.	"The Struggle"	2:01
9.	"Yuri Wakes Up Screaming"	1:35
Total length:		18:05

== Trivia ==
- "Party II" is a sequel song to "Party, My House, Be There" from the band's fourth album, Slowly Going the Way of the Buffalo.
