= MxPx (album) =

Studio album by MxPx
- Released: July 25, 2018
- Genre: Pop-punk; skate punk
- Length: 30:09
- Label: MxPx Global Enterprises
- Producer: MxPx

MxPx chronology
Plans Within Plans (2012)	MxPx (2018)	Find A Way Home (2023)

Singles from MxPx
- 1. "Let’s Ride" Released: June 29, 2018; 2. "Rolling Strong" Released: July 6, 2018

MxPx is the tenth studio album by American rock band MxPx self-released on July 25, 2018. The band used the crowd-funding website Kickstarter and exceeded their $50,000 goal by over $200,000. A month before the album's release, MxPx released a music video of "Let's Ride." A deluxe edition of the record was also released, containing the original track listing along with four bonus songs and acoustic versions of five of the original tracks.

"Let's Ride" was included in the 2020 video game Tony Hawk's Pro Skater 1 + 2.

== Production and recording ==
Herrera tweeted on March 29, 2018, that MxPx is working on their 10th album. A Kickstarter campaign was launched that same day. To pay for the album, they would sell exclusive merchandise to fans through Kickstarter. According to the band's Kickstarter campaign, the record is set to be a self-released effort that has a $50,000 goal. With the raised funds, the majority of the money will go to prep and marketing. Costs will be put into hiring an engineer to record and mix the record with plans of releasing the record all around the world, not just North America. The funding period would go from March 29 – May 4 and the campaign concluded with a total of $273,349 and 4,030 pledgers. The band streamed and played the album live the day before the official release. Immediately after the live performance, those who contributed to the campaign received a download of the album.

As touring came to halt due to the COVID-19 pandemic, a deluxe edition was released on April 14, 2020. It contained the full original 11-song album, 4 bonus tracks and 5 acoustic versions was released.

== Track listing ==
No.	Title	Length
1.	"Rolling Strong"	2:20
2.	"All Of It"	2:14
3.	"Friday Tonight"	3:28
4.	"Let's Ride"	3:25
5.	"Uptown Streets"	3:11
6.	"20/20 Hindsight"	2:24
7.	"The Way We Do"	2:44
8.	"Life Goals"	2:23
9.	"Pipe Dreams"	2:41
10.	"Disaster"	2:22
11.	"Moments Like This"	3:03
Total length:		30:09

== Personnel ==
- Mike Herrera – bass guitar, lead vocals
- Yuri Ruley – drums, percussion, backing vocals
- Tom Wisniewski – guitar, backing vocals
- Chris Adkins – guitar, backing vocals
