= On the Cover II =

Studio album by MxPx
- Released: March 24, 2009
- Length: 34:10
- Label: Tooth & Nail

MxPx chronology
Secret Weapon (2007)	On the Cover II (2009)	Punk Rawk Christmas (2009)

Professional ratings
Review scores
Source	Rating
AllMusic	3/5 stars
Christian Music Zine	B
Melodic	3/5 stars
Punknews.org	3/5 stars

On the Cover II is the second studio cover album by American punk rock band MxPx, released on March 24, 2009.

== Songs ==
The album is a sequel to the On the Cover (1995) EP and features covers of various 1980s songs. Craig Owens of Chiodos features on the cover of Poison's "Fallen Angel". Ethan Luck of Relient K features on the cover of Queen's "Somebody to Love", as does Bryce Avary of the Rocket Summer, who performs vocals and keyboards. Emily Whitehurst of Tsunami Bomb and the Action Design features on the cover of Belinda Carlisle's "Heaven Is a Place on Earth". Matt Hensley of Flogging Molly features on the cover of Dead Milkmen's "Punk Rock Girl".

== Release ==
In December 2008, the band said that the album would be released in March 2009. The album's artwork was posted online on January 5, 2009. On February 8, 2009, a medley of covers from the album was posted on the group's Myspace profile. Beginning on February 9, 2009, feature artists were announced, one per day, on Alternative Press' website. On the Cover II was originally planned for released on March 10, until it was eventually released on March 24. In May 2009, the band played two shows in China with SKO and Secret 7 Line.

== Track listing ==
No.	Title	Originally by	Length
1.	"Punk Rock Girl" (featuring Matt Hensley of Flogging Molly)	Dead Milkmen	2:36
2.	"I Will Follow"	U2	3:04
3.	"Suburban Home"	Descendents	1:45
4.	"I'm Gonna Be (500 Miles)" (features a brief interlude of "Surrender" by Cheap Trick)	The Proclaimers	4:12
5.	"My Brain Is Hanging Upside Down (Bonzo Goes to Bitburg)"	Ramones	3:12
6.	"Vacation"	The Go-Go's	2:39
7.	"Heaven Is a Place on Earth" (featuring Emily Whitehurst of Tsunami Bomb and the Action Design)	Belinda Carlisle	2:34
8.	"Kids in America"	Kim Wilde	3:05
9.	"Fallen Angel" (featuring Craig Owens of Chiodos and Stephen Egerton of Descendents)	Poison	2:55
10.	"Should I Stay or Should I Go"	The Clash	2:43
11.	"Linda Linda"	The Blue Hearts	3:05
12.	"Somebody to Love" (featuring Ethan Luck of Relient K and Bryce Avary of the Rocket Summer)	Queen	3:30

Japanese bonus track
No.	Title	Originally by	Length
13.	"Linda Linda (Japanese Version)"	The Blue Hearts	3:05

iTunes bonus track
No.	Title	Originally by	Length
13.	"Major Tom (Coming Home)"	Peter Schilling	3:35

== Personnel ==
- Mike Herrera – vocals, bass
- Tom Wisniewski – guitars, vocals
- Yuri Ruley – drums
- Guest artists
  - Ethan Luck of Relient K and Demon Hunter – guitar solo on track 12
  - Bryce Avary of The Rocket Summer – vocals, keyboard on track 12
  - Matt Hensley of Flogging Molly – accordion on track 1
  - Agent M of Tsunami Bomb/The Action Design – vocals on track 7
  - Craig Owens of D.R.U.G.S. – vocals on track 9
  - Stephen Egerton of Descendents – guitar solo on track 9
