= Find a Way Home =

Find A Way Home

Studio album by MxPx
- Released: August 25, 2023
- Studios: Monkey Trench Studios, Bremerton, Washington
- Genre: Pop-punk
- Length: 33:26
- Label: MxPx Global Enterprises
- Producers: MxPx; Ryan Furlott; Tom Chichila

MxPx chronology
MxPx (2018)	Find A Way Home (2023)	Living In The Chaos (2027)

Singles from Find A Way Home
- 1. "Stay Up All Night" Released: July 21, 2023

Find A Way Home is the eleventh studio album by American rock band MxPx, released on August 25, 2023. The album was first announced across MxPx's social media pages on July 6. It is their first studio album in five years, since MxPx (2018).

The album was preceded by the sole single, "Stay Up All Night". Every song on the album has been given a music video.

== Track listing ==
Adapted from Apple Music.

All tracks are written by Mike Herrera.

No.	Title	Length
1.	"Not Today"	2:12
2.	"This Is What You Told Me"	2:18
3.	"What I Tell Myself"	2:24
4.	"Cautious Optimistic"	2:45
5.	"Excuse My French"	2:29
6.	"Stay Up All Night"	2:58
7.	"Ready To Rage"	2:45
8.	"Undone"	2:37
9.	"Call Me"	2:31
10.	"Mountains To Climb"	2:42
11.	"Sunrise"	1:21
12.	"When We Broke Through"	2:52
13.	"Mistakes Will Be Made"	3:28
Total length:		33:26

== Personnel ==
Adapted from Bandcamp.

MxPx

- Mike Herrera – bass guitar, lead vocals
- Yuri Ruley – drums, percussion, backing vocals
- Tom Wisniewski – lead guitar, backing vocals
- Chris Adkins – rhythm guitar, backing vocals

Additional performers

- Tra Milburn, Cheyne Smith, Amanda Fedje, Andy Mitchell, Breezy Mitchell, Hudson Mitchell, Reo Mitchell, Sophia Mitchell, Tara Cleveland, Melissa Anderson, Fran Flannigan, Winter Mitchell, Jason Niemeyer, Colby Ostheimer, Shanna Anderson, Sailor Herrera, Rhodes Herrera, Holli Herrera, Payton White, Jonathan White, Tra Milburn and Cheyne Smith – group/gang vocals

Technical personnel

- MxPx – producers
- Ryan Furlott – producer, recording, engineering, mixing
- Tom Chichila – producer, executive producer, art concepts
- Mike Herrera – executive producer, art concepts
- Tra Milburn – studio assistant & video
- Ric Vaughn – studio house technician
- Joseph J. Chudyk – immersive mix engineer
- Kris Crummett – mastering
- Levi Seitz – vinyl mastering
- Cole Roberts – album art & layout, art concepts
- Mark Woodbridge – art concepts, label & distribution management
- Tom Wisniewski – art concepts
