= Secret Weapon (album) =

Studio album by MxPx
- Released: July 16, 2007
- Recorded: February–March 2007
- Genre: Skate punk, punk rock
- Length: 49:54
- Label: Tooth & Nail
- Producer: Aaron Sprinkle

MxPx chronology
Let's Rock (2006)	Secret Weapon (2007)	On the Cover II (2009)

Singles from Secret Weapon
- 1. "You're on Fire" Released: August 21, 2007

Secret Weapon is the eighth studio album by American punk rock band MxPx, released on July 16, 2007 and is considered a "back to roots" album for the group.

Secret Weapon is available in three different versions:

- The standard version with 16 tracks
- A double 12-inch vinyl version with special artwork
- A special edition with a "Making of..." DVD, new artwork, and three extra tracks

== Background ==
On November 7, 2006, it was announced the group had re-signed with Tooth & Nail Records. In February 2007, the band revealed they were aiming to release an album through the label by mid-2007.

== Release ==
On May 2, 2007, Secret Weapon was announced for release. In the same announcement, the album's track listing was revealed, and the title track was made available for streaming. In May and June, the band headlined the Tooth & Nail Tour with support from the Classic Crime, the Fold, Sullivan, Run Kid Run, Hawk Nelson and Project 86. The album received much online publicity before its release, much due to MxPx's return to Tooth and Nail Records.

On July 5, 2007, a music video was released for "Secret Weapon". Secret Weapon was made available for streaming on July 10, before being released a week later through Tooth & Nail Records. The group performed a week's worth of shows on the 2007 edition of Warped Tour between late July and early August. "You're on Fire" was released to radio on August 21. A music video was released for "Shut It Down" on November 19, 2007. In January 2008, the band toured Japan and Indonesia, prior to a stint in Australia. They were originally scheduled to support Yellowcard in March and April 2008, however, they had to pull out due to scheduling conflicts. Instead, the band toured across the US with Chiodos in April 2008 and appeared at the Bamboozle Left festival. Following this, the band toured with the Colour Fred, until May 2008. On September 5, a music video was released for "Contention". In September and October 2008, the band went on a co-headlining US tour with Lagwagon; they were supported by Only Crime and TAT.

== Reception ==
Professional ratings
Review scores
Source	Rating
AllMusic	4/5 stars
AbsolutePunk	87%

The album debuted at No. 76 on the Billboard 200; it also went to No. 1 on the Billboard's Christian chart. In 2008, the album was nominated for a Dove Award for Rock Album of the Year at the 39th GMA Dove Awards.

== Track listing ==
All songs written by Mike Herrera.

No.	Title	Length
1.	"Secret Weapon" (featuring Brian Baker of Bad Religion)	2:06
2.	"Shut It Down" (featuring Tim Pagnotta of Sugarcult)	2:59
3.	"Here's to the Life"	2:57
4.	"Top of the Charts"	2:33
5.	"Punk Rawk Celebrity"	2:42
6.	"Contention"	1:16
7.	"Angels"	3:15
8.	"Drowning"	3:50
9.	"Chop Shop"	2:14
10.	"You're on Fire"	3:18
11.	"Bass So Low"	3:37
12.	"Sad Sad Song"	2:44
13.	"Never Better Than Now"	2:47
14.	"Biting the Bullet (Is Bad for Business)"	3:18
15.	"Not Nothing"	3:06
16.	"Tightly Wound / All About Nothing" (hidden track - featuring Benji Madden of Good Charlotte)	6:29
Total length:		49:54

=== Vinyl and special edition tracks ===
In addition to the 16 tracks included on all versions of the album, the special editions come with 3 additional tracks:

No.	Title	Length
17.	"The Hoo-Ha Jangle"	3:29
18.	"Madcap Scheme"	2:10
19.	"Throw Your Body in the Air / All About Nothing" (hidden track)	6:38

== Personnel ==
- Mike Herrera – lead vocals, bass
- Tom Wisniewski – guitars, backing vocals
- Yuri Ruley – drums
