= Before Everything & After =

Studio album by MxPx
- Released: September 16, 2003
- Genre: Pop punk
- Length: 47:04
- Label: A&M
- Producer: Ron Fair, Dave Jerden

MxPx chronology
Ten Years and Running (2002)	Before Everything & After (2003)	Panic (2005)

Singles from Before Everything & After
- 1. "Everything Sucks (When You're Gone)" Released: September 9, 2003

Professional ratings
Review scores
Source	Rating
AllMusic	2.5/5 stars
Blender	3/5 stars
IGN	8.5/10

Before Everything & After is the sixth studio album by American punk rock band MxPx, released on September 16, 2003 by A&M Records. The album achieved the band's highest chart position on the Billboard 200, peaking at number 51.

In May and June 2003, the group supported Good Charlotte and New Found Glory on the Honda Civic Tour. Between late August and early October, the group supported Dashboard Confessional on their headlining US tour. "Everything Sucks (When You're Gone)" was released to radio on September 9. In January and February 2004, the band embarked on a co-headlining U.S. tour with Simple Plan. They were supported by Sugarcult, Motion City Soundtrack and Billy Talent.

== Track listing ==
All tracks are written by Mike Herrera.

No.	Title	Length
1.	"Before"	0:20
2.	"Play It Loud" (featuring Halo Friendlies)	3:18
3.	"Well Adjusted"	3:39
4.	"It's Alright" (featuring Benji Madden of Good Charlotte)	3:00
5.	"Brokenhearted" (featuring Kris Roe of The Ataris)	2:10
6.	"First Day of the Rest of Our Lives"	3:00
7.	"Everything Sucks (When You're Gone)"	2:55
8.	"Quit Your Life"	3:35
9.	"More Everything"	2:51
10.	"Kings of Hollywood" (featuring Jordan Pundik of New Found Glory)	3:39
11.	"The Capitol"	2:50
12.	"On the Outs" (featuring Benji Madden of Good Charlotte)	3:10
13.	"Don't Walk Away"	3:59
14.	"You Make Me, Me"	3:05
15.	"You're Not Alone" (featuring Jordan Pundik of New Found Glory)	3:40
16.	"After"	1:43
Total length:		47:04

Japanese bonus track
No.	Title	Length
17.	"Family Affair"	3:57

== Personnel ==
- Mike Herrera – bass guitar, vocals
- Tom Wisniewski – guitar, vocals
- Yuri Ruley – drums, percussion
- Jordan Pundik (New Found Glory) – backing vocals
- Benji Madden (Good Charlotte) – backing vocals
- Kris Roe (The Ataris) – backing vocals
- Ron Fair – executive producer
- Dave Jerden – producer, mixing
- Steve Duda – keyboards
- Phil Shenale – keyboards, string arrangements
- Brian Hall – guitar technician
- Annette Cisneros – engineer
- George Marino – mastering
- Tom Lord-Alge – mixing
- Chris Lord-Alge – mixing
- Ben Grosse – mixing
- Elan Trujillo – assistant
- F. Scott Schafer – photography
- Marc Rhea – studio technician

== Charts ==
Chart (2003)	Peak position
US Billboard 200	51
