= Drunk Injuns =

American skate punk band

The Drunk Injuns
- Also known as: The Drunk Injuns from North Dakota
- Origin: San Jose, California, U.S.
- Genres: Skate punk
- Years active: 1983–present
- Labels: Beware Records, Alternative Tentacles

The Drunk Injuns is an American skate punk band formed in 1983. The band members wear masks that resemble Indian ghost warriors. They claim to believe the masks allow them to channel the spirit world to gain control of their bodies and play better music.

== Founding ==
Vocalist/producer Mörizen Föche originally created and directed Thrasher Magazine's Skate Rock compilation series, and was ultimately responsible for identifying the musical phenomenon in a series of magazine articles, and is credited with coining the term "Skate Rock". In 1983, MoFo approached the members of the seminal San Jose skate punk band Los Olvidados about forming a new band. MoFo suggested the group don Indian masks.

== Members ==
- Mörizen Föche aka MoFo/Restless Spirit (vocals)
- Ray Stevens II aka Johnny Yuma (bass)
- Mike Fox aka Whölley Smökkes (guitar)
- Mike Voss aka Stoned Wolf (guitar)
- Matt Etheridge aka Sitting Duck (drums)

== Discography ==
=== Main albums ===
Year	Title
1983	My Dad Butch
1985	Crimes Against Humanity
1987	Frontside Grind
2002	From Where the Sun Now Stands I Will Fight No More, Forever

=== Compilations ===
Year	Title
1983	Thrasher SkateRock Volume 1 - Thrasher SkateRock
1983	Faction Productions - Growing Pains
1984	Thrasher SkateRock Volume 2 - Blazing Wheels And Barking Trucks
1988	Thrasher SkateRock Volume 6 - Road Rash
