= Let's Rock (MxPx album) =

Compilation album by MxPx
- Released: November 13, 2006 (International, UK); October 24, 2006 (US)
- Genre: Pop punk, punk rock
- Label: SideOneDummy

MxPx chronology
Panic (2005)	Let's Rock (2006)	Secret Weapon (2007)

Professional ratings
Review scores
Source	Rating
AllMusic	2.5/5 stars
IGN	6.7/10
Punknews.org	2/5 stars

Let's Rock is a compilation album of B-sides and unreleased recording by American punk rock MxPx, released on October 24, 2006. "You Walk, I Run" was recorded by Jerry Finn during "the Ever Passing Moment" sessions, and "Make Up Your Mind" was also recorded by Finn and was released on "the Broken Bones" 7-inch. Both songs appeared on the "Responsibility" Australian import. The remaining ten tracks were previously unreleased and were self-produced. "Sweet Sweet Thing," an acoustic version here, was originally recorded with the entire band during the "Before Everything & After" sessions with Dave Jerden, then titled "Family Affair" and featuring slightly different lyrics. It was left off the album, although a portion of it can be heard in the album's "Before" and "After" tracks. Music videos were made for "Breathe Deep" and "Running Out of Time."

== Track listing ==
1. "You Walk, I Run" (Re-recorded)
2. "Every Light" (Unreleased)
3. "1 And 3" (Unreleased) [The noise at the beginning is from 'Star Wars Episode V The Empire Strikes Back."]
4. "Don't Forget Me (When You're Gone)" (Unreleased)
5. "Breathe Deep" (Unreleased)
6. "Make Up Your Mind" (Originally on Broken Bones 7" - Re-Recorded)
7. "Running out of Time" (Unreleased)
8. "Slow Ride" (Unreleased)
9. "Where Did You Go?" (Unreleased)
10. "Sweet Sweet Thing" (Acoustic and slightly modified rendition of rare song "Family Affair")
11. "Last Train" (Acoustic - Unreleased)
12. "You Walk, I Run" (Acoustic - Unreleased)
