= Panic (MxPx album) =

Studio album by MxPx
- Released: June 6, 2005
- Recorded: 2004–2005
- Genre: Pop punk, punk rock
- Length: 41:53
- Label: SideOneDummy
- Producer: Stephen Egerton, Gavin MacKillop

MxPx chronology
Before Everything & After (2003)	Panic (2005)	Let's Rock (2006)

Singles from Panic
- 1. "Heard That Sound" Released: May 17, 2005; 2. "Wrecking Hotel Rooms" Released: July 26, 2005

Professional ratings
Review scores
Source	Rating
AbsolutePunk	74%
AllMusic	3.5/5 stars
Drowned in Sound	6/10
IGN	3.9/10
Melodic	3/5 stars
Rock Hard	7/10

Panic is the seventh studio album by American punk rock band MxPx, released on June 6, 2005.

== Release ==
On May 5, 2005, Panic was announced for release the following month; alongside, its artwork and track listing was posted online. "Heard That Sound" was released to radio on May 17, 2005. Three days later, "The Darkest Places" was posted on the band's Myspace profile. Panic was made available for streaming on May 30, 2005, before it was released on June 7, 2005 through SideOneDummy Records. It featured the Blink-182/+44 singer-bassist Mark Hoppus on "Wrecking Hotel Rooms". On June 30, 2005, the music video for "Heard That Sound" was posted online, following which they appeared on the 2005 Warped Tour. "Wrecking Hotel Rooms" was released to radio on July 26, 2005. In October and November 2005, they supported Relient K on their headlining US tour. In January 2006, the band went on a co-headlining UK tour with the Starting Line, with support from the Matches and I Am the Avalanche. In March 2006, they went on a Canadian tour, which was followed by a handful of shows in the US and Japan. They then supported Reel Big Fish on their headlining US tour, and appeared at the Lifest and Cornerstone Festival in July 2006.

== Track listing ==
All tracks are written by Mike Herrera.

No.	Title	Length
1.	"The Darkest Places"	2:35
2.	"Young and Depressed"	3:05
3.	"Heard That Sound"	3:40
4.	"Cold Streets"	2:46
5.	"The Story"	3:31
6.	"Wrecking Hotel Rooms" (featuring Mark Hoppus)	3:26
7.	"Late Again"	2:35
8.	"Kicking and Screaming"	2:52
9.	"Grey Skies Turn Blue"	3:04
10.	"Emotional Anarchist"	2:02
11.	"Call in Sick"	3:00
12.	"Get Me Out"	2:10
13.	"Waiting for the World to End"	3:46
14.	"This Weekend"	3:21
Total length:		41:53

== Personnel ==
- Mike Herrera – bass guitar, lead vocals
- Yuri Ruley – drums, percussion, backing vocals, choir, chorus
- Tom Wisniewski – guitar, backing vocals, choir, chorus

Additional personnel

- James Barrett – backing vocals, choir, chorus
- Patti Day – choir, chorus
- Mark Hoppus – background vocals on "Wrecking Hotel Rooms"
- Andy Husted – choir, chorus
- Robert Lloyd Martin – choir, chorus
- Jack Parker – guitar, soloist
- Seth Alan Roberts – backing vocals, layout design

Production

- Stephen Egerton – producer
- Gavin MacKillop – producer
- Mauro Rubbi – engineer
- Joe Sib – A&R

== Chart positions ==
Album - Billboard (North America)

Year	Chart	Position
2005	The Billboard 200	77
2005	Top Christian Albums	1
2005	Top Independent Albums	3
