= Teenage Politics =

Studio album by MxPx
- Released: June 23, 1995
- Recorded: April 1995
- Studio: Avast! Recording Company (Seattle, Washington)
- Genre: Punk rock; skate punk
- Length: 45:48
- Label: Tooth & Nail
- Producer: Bob Moon

MxPx chronology
Pokinatcha (1994)	Teenage Politics (1995)	Life in General (1996)

Singles from Teenage Politics
- 1. "Teenage Politics" Released: 1995; 2. "Punk Rawk Show" Released: 1995

Teenage Politics is the second studio album by the American punk rock band MxPx, released on June 23, 1995 by Tooth & Nail Records. The album featured one of MxPx's most well-known songs, "Punk Rawk Show", as well as the single "Teenage Politics". According to the Times Colonist, the album sold 50,000 copies. The band toured in support of the album.

== Track listing ==
All tracks are written by Mike Herrera.

No.	Title	Length
1.	"Sugarcoated Poison Apple"	2:21
2.	"Do & Don't"	3:37
3.	"Teenage Politics"	2:51
4.	"Punk Rawk Show"	2:32
5.	"The Opposite Of Intellect"	2:51
6.	"False Fiction"	3:25
7.	"Falling Down"	2:04
8.	"Moneytree"	1:41
9.	"Rainyday"	2:42
10.	"Like Sand Through The Hourglass... So Are The Days Of Our Lives"	1:57
11.	"Democracy"	1:53
12.	"Something More"	2:19
13.	"Different Things"	1:18
14.	"Misunderstanding"	2:42
15.	"Study Humans"	2:20
16.	"Inquiring Minds Want to Know"	2:17
17.	"I'm the Bad Guy"	1:42
18.	"Americanism"	2:28
19.	"Dolores"	2:37
Total length:		43:46

== Personnel ==
MxPx

- Mike Herrera – bass guitar, vocals
- Tom Wisniewski – guitar, backing vocals
- Yuri Ruley – drums

Production

- Bob Moon – producer, engineer

Artwork

- John Nissen – cover art, back art
- Flywheel Design – layout
- Michele Herrera – photography
- Karen Mason – photography
- Rob Martin – photography
