= Steve Kravac =

Canadian musician

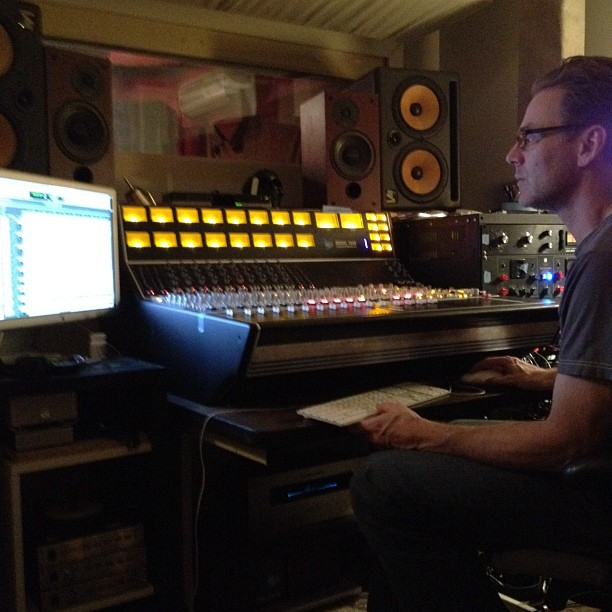
- Steve in studio

Background information
- Born: June 17, 1964 (age 62)
- Origin: British Columbia, Canada
- Genres: Punk rock, indie rock, ska, hardcore, power pop, Pop punk
- Occupations: Record producer, recording engineer, musician, composer
- Instruments: Drums, bass guitar, guitar, vocals
- Years active: 1986–present
- Labels: Porterhouse, Porterhouse Prime Vinyl, Porterhouse 101
- Website: www.stevekravac.com

Steven B. Kravac (born June 17, 1964), is a Canadian-born RIAA gold-accredited record producer, recording engineer, musician and composer. He is the owner of the music label Porterhouse Records and its sub-labels Porterhouse Prime Vinyl and Porterhouse 101.

He has produced albums for MxPx, Pepper, Less Than Jake, Tsunami Bomb, and Home Grown among others. Known for achieving a polished radio friendly sound, many of the acts he has worked with have enjoyed a moderate amount of commercial success.

== Life and career ==
Steve Kravac was born in Burnaby, British Columbia, Canada, a suburb of the City of Vancouver. He attended Burnaby North Secondary School and while in high school began playing drums and founded his first band, Social Outcasts who played locally in support of punk acts DOA and the Angelic Upstarts. He graduated in 1982, and shortly thereafter moved across Canada to the city Montreal where he resided for twelve years.

While in Montreal he attended Concordia University for two years studying photography and film before leaving the school to pursue music as a full-time career. At this time he began working on his first commercial productions including records from Canadian bands Doughboys, Asexuals and Jerry Jerry and the Sons of Rhythm Orchestra. He also joined the punk band My Dog Popper, and played drums on two records as well as performing live with the group and in their side project Johnny Neon Beef. Later he would join forces with noted Canadian songwriter Alex Soria of the band The Nils. to form Los Patos, a pop rock music vehicle for Soria's songs. The line up consisted of Soria on guitar and vocals, Stephan (Hams) Hamel on bass and Kravac on drums and background vocals. The project was short lived, but one commercial track was released, a cover of Donovan's "Changes" which was on Island of Circles, a tribute album to Donovan released on the Vancouver, B.C.-based Nettwerk Records.

In 1994 shortly after the Northridge earthquake in Los Angeles, a recording engineer position became available at Westbeach Recorders. Well known in the punk rock community, Westbeach was located in Hollywood and co-owned by Brett Gurewitz of Epitaph Records and his business partner, noted recording engineer Donnell Cameron. With a little prompting from Youth Brigade drummer Mark Stern, Donnell asked Kravac to forward him a demo reel of his work. Cameron was impressed enough with the contents of the demo to offer Kravac a position at Westbeach and three months later in March 1994 Kravac moved to Los Angeles to take the job.

Kravac would remain at Westbeach for the next five years and during that time began recording some of the acts that he would eventually be best known for working with. One of the first sessions he engineered upon arrival in L.A. was the debut album Cheshire Cat by Blink-182. The record released on Cargo Records went on to be a successful release for the band and provided a springboard to other production and engineering opportunities.

In 1996 he produced the third and final album Total Chaos released for Epitaph Records. "Anthems from the Alleyways" had a more commercial and polished sound compared to their earlier more hardcore albums.

One of those opportunities was with the record label Tooth and Nail, a Christian music label based in Seattle Washington. Kravac produced a number of bands for the label including The O.C. Supertones album "Supertones Strike Back" which was nominated for a Dove award for Modern Rock/Alternative record of the year, in 1998 by the Gospel Music Association. It was through Tooth and Nail that Kravac also began working with the Bremerton-based band MxPx for whom he produced three full-length albums including the RIAA gold accredited album "Slowly Going the Way of the Buffalo" released on A&M Records and Life in General which featured "Chick Magnet", arguably the band's most popular single and a popular record amongst their fans.

Also in 1998, Steve produced, engineered, and mixed the Christian pop-punk band Slick Shoes second full-length album "Burn Out" at Westbeach Recorders for their then label Tooth & Nail. Burn Out is still one of Slick Shoes fan favorite albums, taking a more west coast hardcore approach in their guitar riffs and melodic content.

Around the spring of 1999 Kravac left Westbeach Recorders to begin working as an independent record producer. Among the acts he has worked with are 7 Seconds, Guttermouth, Less Than Jake and Buck O Nine.

In 1999, Steve produced, engineered, and mixed California based punk band 7 Seconds' album "Good To Go" for punk label SideOneDummy "Good To Go" was a return to 7 Seconds original 80's hardcore sound that their fans had grown accustomed to.

In 2019 he released his first solo LP under the moniker Steven Bradley. The album was released to critical acclaim on September 27, 2019 and was quickly added to many Indie and College radio playlists. Described by critics as"simply note perfect, bouncy, joyous power pop". Bringing comparisons to Bob Mould, Elvis Costello and Nick Lowe. Summer Bliss and Autumn Tears was written, produced and recorded at his own Hell's Half Acre Studio in California. While Bradley played almost all the instruments on the LP he recruiting some additional talent to round out the sound, including Wayne Kramer (MC5), Kevin Kane (Grapes of Wrath, Northern Pikes), Steve McDonald (Red Kross), Mike Herrera (MXPX), Danny McGough (Social Distortion, Continental Drifters) and pedal steel virtuoso Greg Leisz.

The single "Capitol Hill" and its accompanying video hit a nostalgic note with other past and present residents of the Vancouver neighborhood it was named for. "The song's video features a blend of archival photos and more recent footage of Bradley's old stomping grounds, which will probably get any other ex-Burnaby residents feeling all misty-eyed as well."

Bradley celebrated the release of the album by playing live shows in LA and San Diego with his band featuring Richard Lloyd of the seminal post punk band Television.

=== Porterhouse records ===
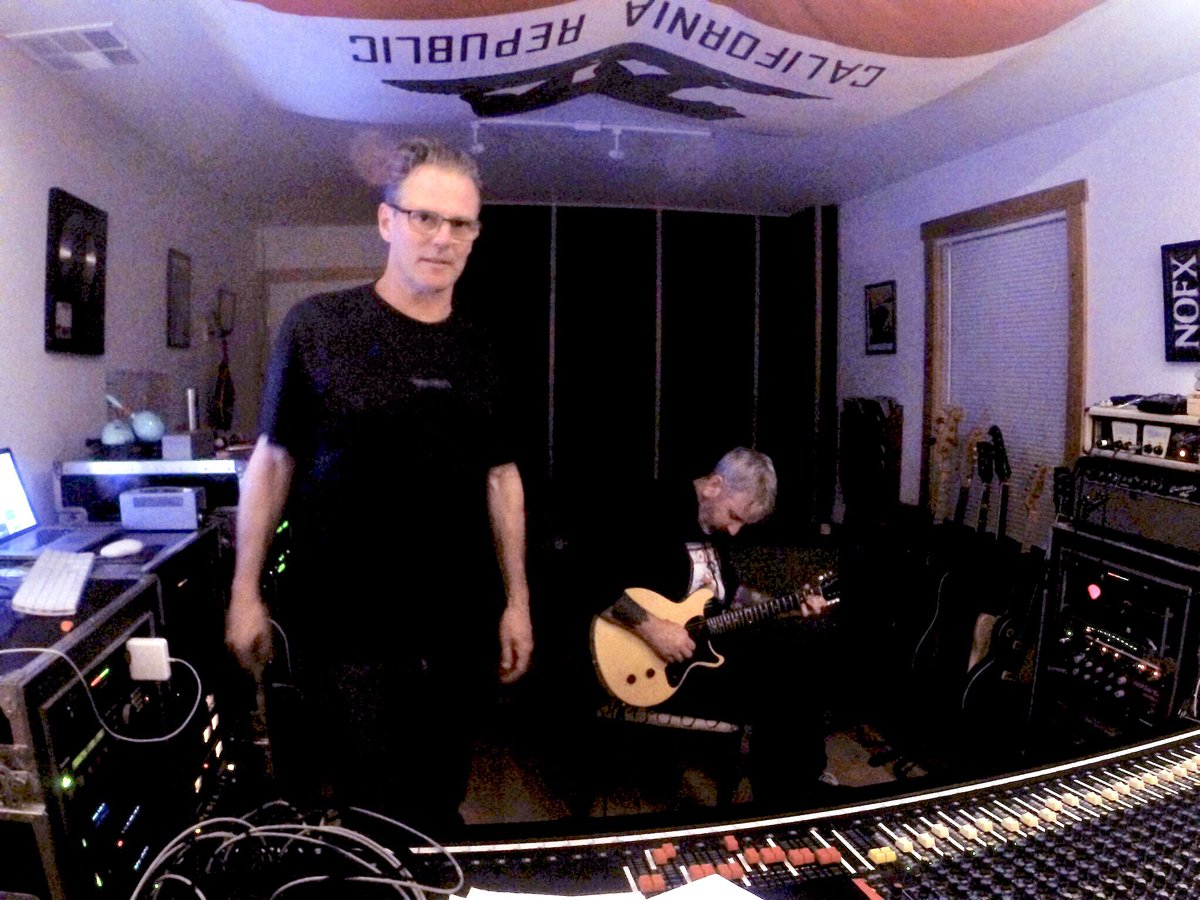
Steve Kravac in the studio, 2018

In 1997 Kravac created a small indie record label named Porterhouse Records (after the character Smoke Porterhouse in the film Caddyshack). The first signings were local acts with small followings: Speedbuggy and Rosemary’s Billygoat. While neither act brought the label any real commercial success the label was able to create distribution channels worldwide with these first products. Other acts signed to the label include Outlie a side project from Luke Pabich of the band Good Riddance and Lightweight Holiday a critically acclaimed indie-rock band from Cincinnati. Neither of these records met with any commercial success, and both of these bands are inactive at this time.

In 2009 Porterhouse launched a sub label called Prime Vinyl to re-issue notable punk and indie releases on vinyl. The Los Angeles band X were one of the first bands to be selected for the new imprint and to date Prime Vinyl has re-released their albums Wild Gift, Under the Big Black Sun and More Fun in the New World.

In addition to Prime Vinyl Porterhouse has started a digital only label called Porterhouse 101 to launch developing artists and to re-issue catalog digitally. Signings to the label include Kidneys featuring Brooks Wackerman of Bad Religion.

=== Hell's Half Acre ===
In early 2013 Steve opened the doors to his new recording studio Hell's Half Acre. Located roughly an hour north of Los Angeles in the southern California countryside his new facility is a combination of analog and digital recording equipment. Steve uses the studio to track, and mix artists he works with. Early clients at the studio have been the Calgary-based folk-punk band Jenny, and 7 Seconds.
