= Life in General =

Studio album by MxPx
- Released: November 19, 1996
- Recorded: April 1996 (1st recording); July 1996 (2nd recording)
- Studio: West Beach Studios (Hollywood)
- Genre: Punk rock; skate punk; pop-punk
- Length: 43:46
- Label: Tooth & Nail
- Producer: Steve Kravac

MxPx chronology
Teenage Politics (1995)	Life in General (1996)	Slowly Going the Way of the Buffalo (1998)

Singles from Life in General
- 1. "Doing Time" Released: 1997; 2. "Move To Bremerton" Released: 1997; 3. "Chick Magnet" Released: 1998

Professional ratings
Review scores
Source	Rating
AllMusic	4.5/5 stars
Punknews.org	1.5/5 stars
Rock Hard	4.5/10

Life in General is the third studio album by the American punk rock band MxPx, released on November 19, 1996. The album features the song "Chick Magnet", as well as artwork by the American artist Coop. Prior to the release of Slowly Going the Way of the Buffalo (1998), the album had sold over 89,000 copies.

== Track listing ==
All tracks are written by Mike Herrera.

No.	Title	Length
1.	"Middlename"	2:55
2.	"My Mom Still Cleans My Room"	2:50
3.	"Do Your Feet Hurt"	3:10
4.	"Sometimes You Have to Ask Yourself"	2:19
5.	"The Wonder Years"	1:51
6.	"Move to Bremerton"	3:35
7.	"New York to Nowhere"	2:16
8.	"Andrea"	1:46
9.	"Your Problem, My Emergency"	3:16
10.	"Chick Magnet"	3:12
11.	"Today Is in My Way"	3:06
12.	"Sorry So Sorry"	2:14
13.	"Doing Time"	1:23
14.	"Correct Me If I'm Wrong"	2:33
15.	"Cristalena"	2:01
16.	"Destroyed by You"	2:33
17.	"Southbound"	2:34
Total length:		43:46

== Life in General 2.0 ==
To celebrate the album's 20th anniversary in 2016, the band re-recorded the album and released it via e-mail to fans for just one day only. In August 2017, the band officially released it through various streaming services as Life In General 2.0.

== Personnel ==
MxPx

- Mike Herrera – bass guitar, vocals
- Tom Wisniewski – guitar, background vocals
- Yuri Ruley – drums

Production

- Steve Kravac – producer, engineer, drum tech
- Brandon Ebel – executive producer, A&R

Artwork

- Coop – cover art, back art
- Claire Bigbie – layout
- Michele Herrera – photography
- Brandon Ebel – photography

== Charts ==
Album

Chart (1996)	Peak position
Top Heatseekers	22
Top Contemporary Christian	16
