= Pokinatcha =

Studio album by MxPx
- Released: October 26, 1994
- Genre: Christian punk; punk rock
- Length: 48:19
- Label: Tooth & Nail
- Producer: Aaron Sprinkle

MxPx chronology
Pokinatcha (1994)	Teenage Politics (1995)

Singles from Pokinatcha
- 1. "Want Ad" Released: 1994

Pokinatcha is the debut studio album by the American punk rock band MxPx released on October 26, 1994, through Tooth & Nail Records. The album reflects influence from skate/surf punk, and underground punk generally. The album's name came from a Snickers candy bar commercial, which included an ad jingle saying hunger is "poking at you". The songs are characterized by their raw punk sound, catchy rhythm, and classic punk three-chord guitar style. It is the only MxPx album to include original guitarist Andy Husted.

Professional ratings
Review scores
Source	Rating
AllMusic	3/5 stars

== Track listing ==
All tracks are written by Mike Herrera.

No.	Title	Length
1.	"Anywhere But Here"	3:25
2.	"Weak"	3:02
3.	"Want Ad"	1:23
4.	"Realize"	2:26
5.	"Think Twice"	1:52
6.	"Unopposed"	2:26
7.	"The Aspect"	2:50
8.	"Ears to Hear"	2:49
9.	"Bad Hair Day"	1:52
10.	"Too Much Thinking"	3:41
11.	"PxPx"	1:04
12.	"Time Brings Change"	2:25
13.	"Jars of Clay"	2:18
14.	"High Standards"	2:21
15.	"Another Song About T.V."	1:40
16.	"Twisted Words"	2:16
17.	"Walking Bye"	1:48
18.	"No Room"	2:01
19.	"Jay Jay's Song"	1:55
20.	"One Way Window"	2:00
21.	"Dead End"	2:46
Total length:		48:19

== Personnel ==
- Mike Herrera - bass, vocals
- Andy Husted - guitar, background vocals
- Yuri Ruley - drums
