= The Ever Passing Moment =

Studio album by MxPx
- Released: May 16, 2000
- Recorded: October 1999 – March 2000
- Studio: Conway (Hollywood, California); Robert Lang Studios (Seattle, Washington)
- Genre: Pop punk
- Length: 39:57
- Label: A&M
- Producer: Jerry Finn

MxPx chronology
At the Show (1999)	The Ever Passing Moment (2000)	The Renaissance EP (2001)

Singles from The Ever Passing Moment
- 1. "Responsibility" Released: 2000

Professional ratings
Review scores
Source	Rating
AllMusic	4/5 stars
HM Magazine	(not rated) link
Jesus Freak Hideout	3.5/5 stars
North County Times	A−
Rock Hard	6/10

The Ever Passing Moment is the fifth studio album by American punk rock band MxPx, released on May 16, 2000.

MxPx gained critical recognition for this album and landed a slot supporting for the Offspring and Cypress Hill on the Conspiracy of One tour. "Responsibility" proved to be a minor radio hit, peaking at No. 24 on the Billboard Modern Rock chart. Bassist Mike Herrera said on the It Came from Bremerton VHS tape that his songwriting on The Ever Passing Moment was inspired by Elvis Costello's second album This Year's Model.

The intro countdown in the song "The Next Big Thing" is Dave Grohl screaming "1, 2, 3, go!".

== Track listing ==
All songs written by Mike Herrera.

No.	Title	Length
1.	"My Life Story"	2:44
2.	"Buildings Tumble"	2:45
3.	"Responsibility"	2:40
4.	"Two Whole Years"	2:43
5.	"Prove It to the World"	2:34
6.	"Educated Guess"	1:46
7.	"Is the Answer in the Question?"	2:10
8.	"The Next Big Thing"	2:26
9.	"Foolish"	2:53
10.	"One Step Closer to Life"	3:10
11.	"Unsaid"	3:00
12.	"Here With Me"	2:12
13.	"Without You"	2:37
14.	"It's Undeniable"	2:47
15.	"Misplaced Memories"	3:35
Total length:		39:57

== Personnel ==
- Mike Herrera - bass, vocals
- Tom Wisniewski - guitar, backing vocals
- Yuri Ruley - drums
- Dave Grohl - introduction on "The Next Big Thing"
- Stephen Egerton (Descendents) - guitar
- Chip Butters - assistant engineer
- Jerry Finn - producer, engineer, mixing
- Lior Goldenberg - engineer, assistant engineer
- Sean O'Dwyer - engineer
- Darrell Thorp - assistant engineer

== Charts ==
Chart performance for The Ever Passing Moment
Chart (2000)	Peak position
Australian Albums (ARIA)	81
US Billboard 200	56
US Christian Albums (Billboard)	1
