= Slowly Going the Way of the Buffalo =

Studio album by MxPx
- Released: June 16, 1998
- Recorded: February 1998
- Studios: Robert Lang Studios, Seattle, Washington
- Genres: Punk rock; pop-punk
- Length: 40:29
- Labels: A&M; Tooth & Nail
- Producer: Steve Kravac

MxPx chronology
Life in General (1996)	Slowly Going the Way of the Buffalo (1998)	Let It Happen (1998)

Singles from Slowly Going the Way of the Buffalo
- 1. "I'm OK, You're OK" Released: May 6, 1998

Slowly Going the Way of the Buffalo is the fourth studio album by the American punk rock band MxPx in 1998. The album title was taken from a letter that a fan had written to the band, complaining that the band was changing and was "slowly going the way of the buffalo".

== Background ==
Due to the success of MxPx's "Chick Magnet", from their previous album, Life in General, the band signed a multi-album contract with A&M. A&M had previously signed a deal with Tooth & Nail to co-market Life in General. This market deal was "cobbled together in order to sign the band", according to A&M chairman Al Cafaro.

== Composition and recording ==
Moving away from the sound of Life in General, the band "dirtied things up a little", according to vocalist and bassist Mike Herrera, for Slowly Going the Way of the Buffalo. The band refrained from making the album "sound like it was produced in a lab." Greg Hetson of Bad Religion has guest vocals on "The Downfall of Western Civilization".

== Release ==
To generate hype, A&M picked 1,000 of the band's fans and, from April to June 1998, sent them a CD of songs from the album. Despite the band's sizable fan base, the label was not approaching the album with high expectations. The vice president of A&M estimated the album would easily achieve 100,000 in sales. On May 6, "I'm OK, You're OK" was sent to modern rock radio stations. The band supported Bad Religion on their tour of Europe in May. Slowly Going the Way of the Buffalo was released on June 16 through A&M. From June 30, for five weeks, the band played on the 1998 edition of Warped Tour. In August, the band supported Blink-182.

== Reception ==
Professional ratings
Review scores
Source	Rating
AllMusic	4/5 stars
HM Magazine	(favorable)
The Phantom Tollbooth	4/5 stars
Rock Hard	6/10

The album charted at number 99 on the Billboard 200 and at number 2 on the Top Contemporary Christian chart. It certified gold in January 2000 by the Recording Industry Association of America.

== Track listing ==
All tracks are written by Mike Herrera, and arranged by MxPx.

No.	Title	Length
1.	"Under Lock and Key"	2:32
2.	"Tomorrow's Another Day"	2:47
3.	"The Final Slowdance"	1:59
4.	"I'm OK, You're OK"	2:39
5.	"Cold and All Alone"	2:07
6.	"Party, My House, Be There"	2:16
7.	"The Downfall of Western Civilization"	2:42
8.	"Invitation to Understanding"	2:33
9.	"Fist vs Tact"	1:11
10.	"What's Mine Is Yours"	3:44
11.	"Self Serving with a Purpose"	2:48
12.	"For Always"	3:12
13.	"Set the Record Straight"	2:57
14.	"Get with It!"	1:44
15.	"Inches from Life"	1:51
16.	"The Theme Fiasco"	3:10
Total length:		40:29

== Personnel ==
MxPx

- Mike Herrera — vocals, bass
- Tom Wisniewski — guitars, backing vocals
- Yuri Ruley — drums

Additional musicians

- Ronnie King — keyboard
- Greg Hetson — lead guitar on "The Downfall of Western Civilization"
- Dale Yob — vocals on "I'm OK, You're OK"
- Jeff Bettger — screams on "Fist vs. Tact" and "The Theme Fiasco"

Production

- Steve Kravac — producer, mixing
- Aaron Warner — production assistant
- Al Lay — mixing assistant
- Brian "Big Bass" Gardner — mastering

Artwork

- Marina Chavez — photography
- Mitch Tobias — photography
- John Nissen — illustrations
- Luke W. Midkiff — illustrations/ video direction

== Chart positions ==
Album

Chart (1998)	Peak position
U.S. Billboard 200	99
U.S. Billboard Top Contemporary Christian	2

=== Certifications ===
Country	Certification	Sales
United States	Gold	500,000+

== Bibliography ==
- McGovern, Brian Vincent (September–October 1998). "Album Reviews: MxPx Slowly Going the Way of the Buffalo". HM (73). ISSN 1066-6923.
- Reece, Doug (May 23, 1998). "A&M Rounds Up Existing Fan Base For MxPx's 'Buffalo' Set". Billboard. Vol. 110, no. 21. Nielsen Business Media, Inc. ISSN 0006-2510.
- "Top Contemporary Christian". Billboard. Vol. 110, no. 27. Nielsen Business Media, Inc. July 4, 1998. ISSN 0006-2510.
