= Skate punk =

Subgenre of punk rock

- Other names: Skate rock; skatecore
- Stylistic origins: Punk rock; hardcore punk; pop-punk; surf punk; melodic hardcore; nardcore
- Cultural origins: Early 1980s, United States

Regional scenes
- California, United States Victoria, Australia

Other topics
- Skateboarding

Skate punk (also known as skatecore and skate rock) is a skater subculture and punk rock subgenre that developed in the 1980s. Originally a form of hardcore punk that had been closely associated with skate culture, skate punk evolved into a more melodic genre of punk rock in the 1990s similar to pop punk. Since then, it has predominately featured fast tempos, lead guitar playing (including guitar riffs and guitar solos), fast drumming, and singing (sometimes including vocal harmonies). Occasionally, skate punk also combines the fast tempos of hardcore punk and melodic hardcore with the catchy hooks of pop-punk.

1970s and early 1980s punk rock bands like Buzzcocks, Descendents, Adolescents, Black Flag, and Circle Jerks paved the way for skate punk. Skate punk was pioneered in the 1980s by bands such as the Big Boys, Suicidal Tendencies, JFA, T.S.O.L., Drunk Injuns, SNFU, and Love Canal. Many early skate punk bands are part of the hardcore punk movement nardcore, which emerged in Oxnard, California. Skate punk band Bad Religion started the more melodic style of skate punk in 1988 with the band's influential album Suffer. This melodic style of skate punk continued in the 1990s with bands like NOFX, Lagwagon, Pennywise, Face to Face, and No Use for a Name.

Skate punk broke into the mainstream during the 1990s with bands such as the Offspring and Blink-182. Other bands, like NOFX, Pennywise, Face to Face, MxPx and Bad Religion, achieved underground to moderate success. Many skate punk bands' songs were featured in Tony Hawk's video games, a series that sold millions. Punk's popularity continued in the early 2000s with many bands continuing to make albums that received a lot of attention. During the 2010s, later skate punk bands such as Trash Boat, Cerebral Ballzy, and Trash Talk, achieved underground success through the influence of previous skate punk bands.

== Characteristics ==
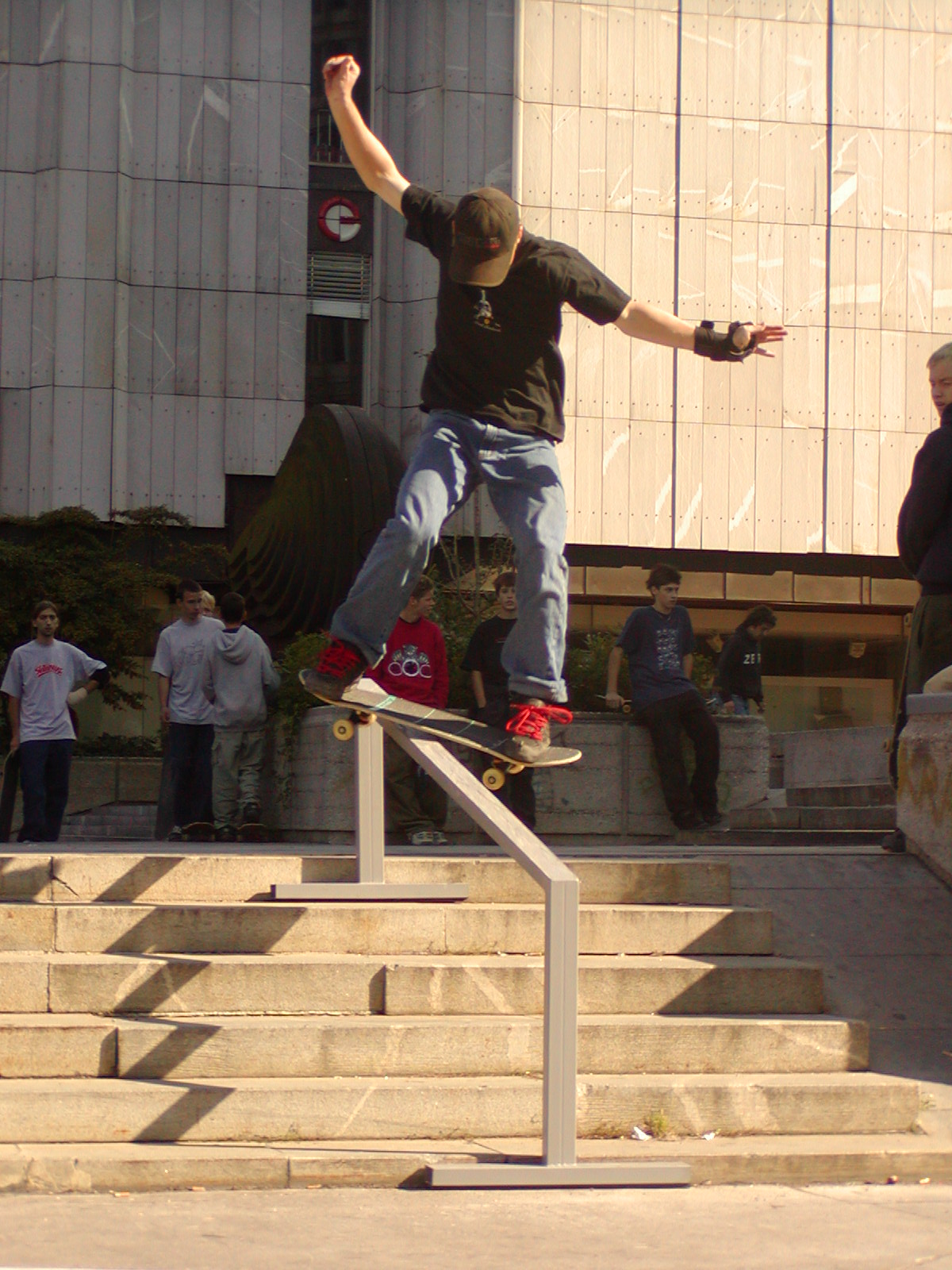
Skateboarding has largely been associated with skate punk and punk rock culture.

Characterized as "the perfect soundtrack to limb-threatening aerial stunts" and "thrash metal’s snotty younger brother", skate punk is also known as "skate rock" and "skatecore". Noted by AllMusic for having "high-energy", skate punk features fast tempos. Many of the original skate punk bands in the 1980s were hardcore punk bands. In the 1990s, this changed when more bands began to play a style of skate punk that sounded more like pop punk and standard punk rock than hardcore punk.

Also a skater subculture, skate punk's origins go back to skate culture and surf culture. Author Sharon M. Hannon noted skate punk is known for "its fast guitars, driving bass lines, and surf music–style drums". According to Mark Lepage of Spin magazine, it often has a "double-time hup-two-three-four beat". Skate punk music often features singing and vocal harmonies. Rolling Stone described skate punk as "a sort of pop hardcore". Some skate punk music has lyrics that are about humor – "mostly of the smartass variety".

Much skate punk music features lead guitar playing, guitar riffs, and sometimes guitar solos. Skate punk is described by AllMusic as having "thrashier guitars" than regular punk rock. Fast drumming are very common in skate punk. Skate punk features the fast tempos of hardcore punk and melodic hardcore, occasionally combining them with the catchy hooks of pop punk. Some skate punk bands play other genres of music; pop punk, funk metal, and hardcore punk are genres that are noted for being played by some skate punk bands. Skate punk paved the way for third-wave ska. Some skate punk bands, including NOFX and the Suicide Machines, also play ska punk. Some skate punk bands, including Suicidal Tendencies and Excel, also play thrash metal or crossover thrash.

== History ==
=== Predecessors (1970s and early 1980s) ===
California punk bands like Black Flag, Adolescents, and Circle Jerks paved the way for skate punk with their "fast and raw" music, "which replicated the feel of skating". 1970s punk bands like the Buzzcocks and 1980s punk bands like The Descendents made fast and catchy punk rock songs about teenage confusion, and also combined the aggression and speed of hardcore punk with pop-inspired melodies.

=== Origins (1980s) ===
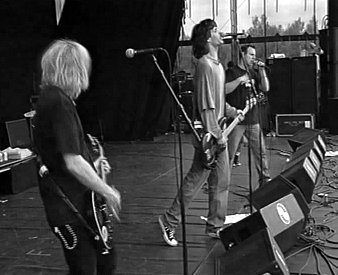
Bad Religion performing live in the Netherlands in 1995

Originally derived from hardcore punk, skate punk began in the early 1980s. The Big Boys and JFA are considered pioneers of skate punk. Bands such as Gang Green, Dayglo Abortions, Suicidal Tendencies, The Faction, Rich Kids on LSD, Tales of Terror and Agression, were among the first wave of skate punk bands. Johnny Loftus of AllMusic described early skate punk music as "a confluence of punk's anger and simplicity, the furious speed of hardcore, and defiantly smart-assed machismo". Many early skate punk bands are part of the hardcore punk movement nardcore, which emerged in Oxnard, California. Popular among skateboarders, 1980s hardcore punk bands with connections to skateboarding culture were labeled as "skate punk" – the origin of the term. Early skate punk bands are noted for creating the connection between punk rock and skateboarding. Mörizen "Mofo" Föche, vocalist of Drunk Injuns and former employee of the magazine Thrasher, is "often credited with first coining the term 'skate-punk'". Bad Religion's 1988 album Suffer is seen by many as a highly influential landmark album in the skate punk genre. Suffer helped start the melodic style of skate punk that continued in the 1990s.

=== Mainstream success (1990s and early 2000s) ===
As skate punk became more popular during the 1990s, it changed into a more melodic genre. During this time, some skate punk bands experienced mainstream success and were featured at events such as the Warped Tour, which started in 1995. Prominent skate punk bands of the 1990s include Consumed, Good Riddance, Strung Out, NOFX, Goldfinger, Lagwagon, Guttermouth, Bodyjar, No Use for a Name, Blink-182, Face to Face, Slick Shoes, MxPx, Unwritten Law, Ten Foot Pole, Screeching Weasel, Bad Religion, the Offspring, and Pennywise.

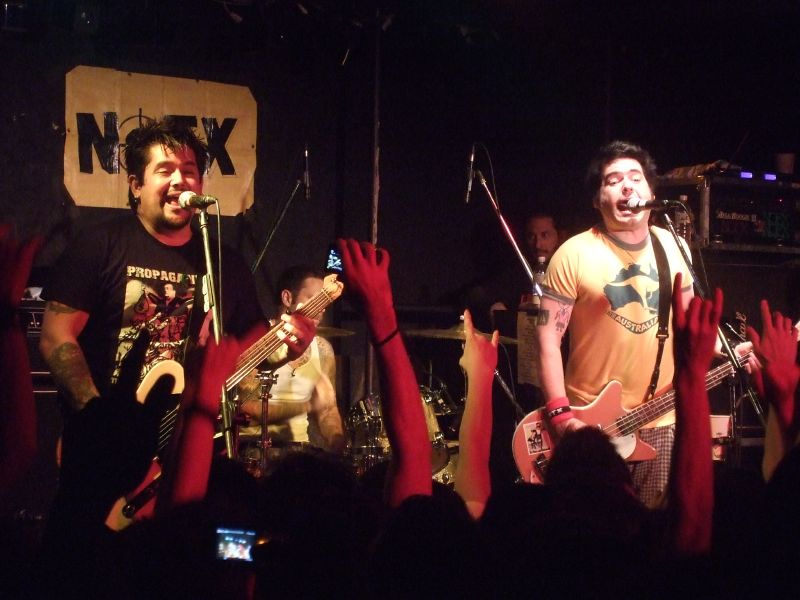
Skate punk band NOFX

Skate punk broke into the mainstream in 1994. The Offspring's album Smash, released in 1994, launched the band into the mainstream. Smash, certified 6× platinum by the Recording Industry Association of America (RIAA), sold at least 6.3 million copies in the United States and at least 5 million copies outside the United States. NOFX's 1994 album Punk in Drublic was eventually certified gold by the RIAA on May 5, 2000. Unlike other 1990s punk rock bands, NOFX never signed to a major record label. Also, NOFX has not given permission for its music videos to be played on channels like MTV and VH1. Explaining this decision NOFX member Fat Mike said: "We made the 'Leave It Alone' video, and we decided not to send it to MTV. We just didn't want to be a part of that machine, of that 'punk wave'. I think it's one of the best decisions we've ever made." California skate punk band Face to Face had local success with their song "Disconnected", which was played often on California radio station KROQ-FM. With "Disconnected" constantly playing on KROQ-FM, Face to Face's 1995 album Big Choice sold more than 100,000 copies.

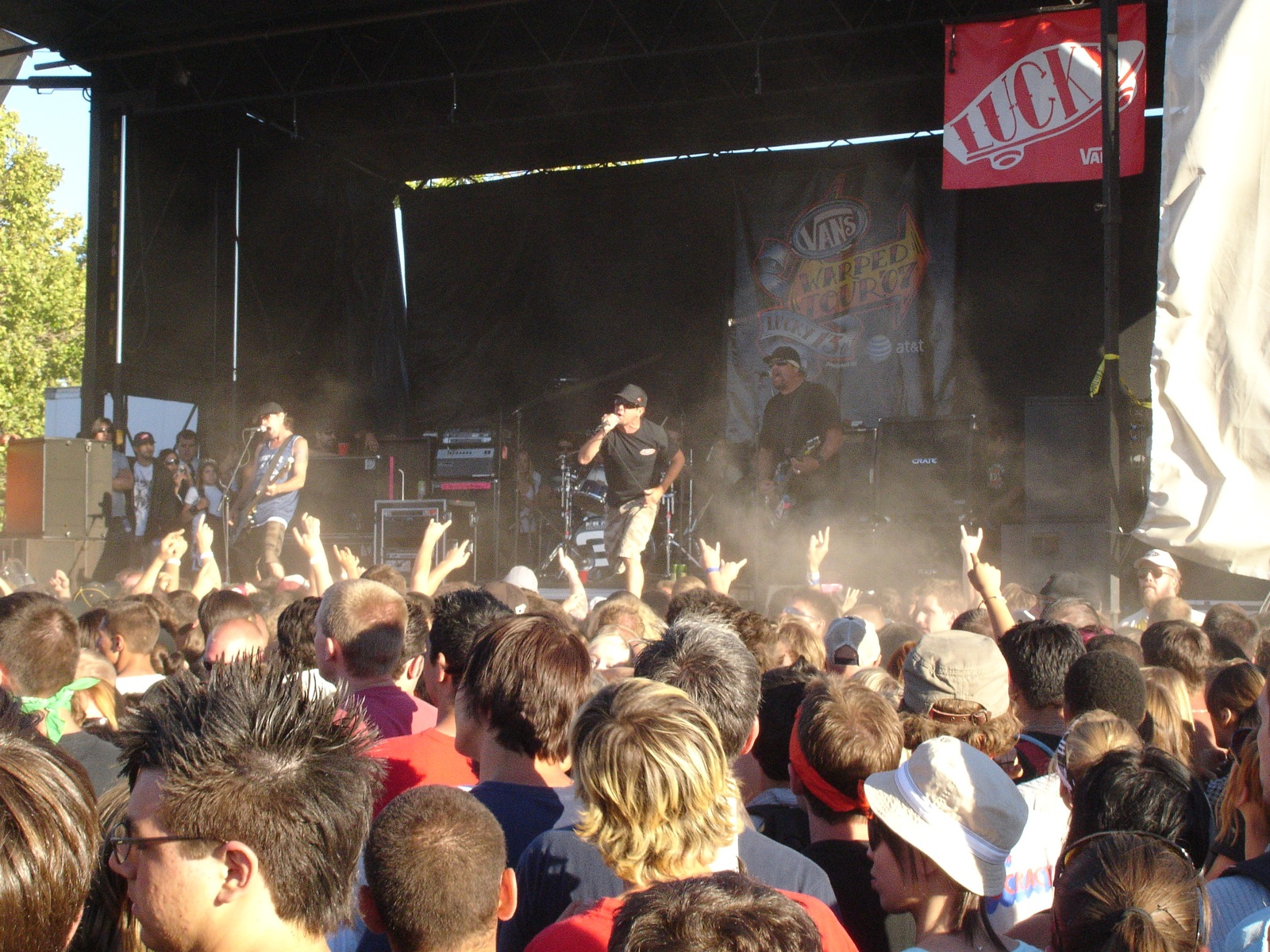
Skate punk band Pennywise at Warped Tour 2007

Other skate punk bands achieved underground to moderate success. Pennywise's 1993 album Unknown Road sold 100,000 copies within two years, according to Nielsen SoundScan, and helped bring the band underground popularity. Bad Religion's 1994 album Stranger Than Fiction was certified gold by the RIAA on March 4, 1998. Stranger Than Fiction's song "21st Century (Digital Boy)" peaked at number 11 on the Alternative Songs chart on December 24, 1994 and the song's music video was played a lot on MTV. Although Ixnay on the Hombre by the Offspring did not achieve the same sales as the Offspring's album Smash, Ixnay on the Hombre by the Offspring was certified platinum by the RIAA in April 1997. As of November 1998, the album sold at least 3 million copies worldwide and, as of August 2015, the album sold 1.4 million copies in the United States. In June 1997, Blink-182 released its album Dude Ranch. It was certified gold by the RIAA in February 1998, and was certified platinum by the RIAA in November 1999. Scott Heisel of Alternative Press described Dude Ranch as "a killer skate-punk record". Dude Ranch's single "Dammit" was a hit. It peaked at number 61 on Billboard's Hot 100 Airplay chart, received heavy radio airplay, and was played a lot by MTV. In 1998, the Offspring released their album Americana, which was certified 5× platinum by the RIAA. MxPx began to receive underground attention in 1996 with the band's third album Life in General, which sold 89,000 copies within two years, according to Nielsen SoundScan, and helped the band's first two albums, Pokinatcha (1994) and Teenage Politics (1995), sell 50,000 combined. The song "Chick Magnet" received limited play on MTV and M2. MxPx released its fourth album Slowly Going the Way of the Buffalo, which was certified gold by the RIAA in January 2000.

Skate punk fan in 2001

The skateboarding video game series Tony Hawk's featured music by many skate punk bands, including JFA, Lagwagon, Guttermouth, the Vandals, Suicidal Tendencies, Millencolin, Bad Religion, and Consumed. Tony Hawk's Pro Skater was one of the top-selling video games for PlayStation in November 1999. Quickly after being released, Tony Hawk's Pro Skater 2, released in 2000, was the top-selling PlayStation title for two consecutive weeks. Tony Hawk's Pro Skater 2 quickly sold 1,000,000 copies. The sales of the video game reached 5,300,000 copies in the United States. Tony Hawk's Pro Skater 3, released in 2001, sold about 2,100,000 copies in the United States. As skate punk achieved success in the 1990s, record labels like Epitaph Records and Fat Wreck Chords signed numerous punk bands.

=== Underground revival (2010s and 2020s) ===
During the 2010s and 2020s, there was an emergence of skate punk bands influenced by older skate punk bands. These bands include Trash Talk, FIDLAR, Trash Boat and Cerebral Ballzy. Many of them attracted cult followings by promoting their music on the Internet. Many of these bands, including Trash Talk and Cerebral Ballzy, are influenced by hardcore punk and speed metal. FIDLAR is influenced by skate punk bands Blink-182 and the Offspring. and achieved underground and moderate success; their self-titled album debuted at number five on Billboard's Top Heatseekers chart.

== See also ==
- List of skate punk bands
- Pop punk
- Skateboarding
