= MxPx =

American punk rock band

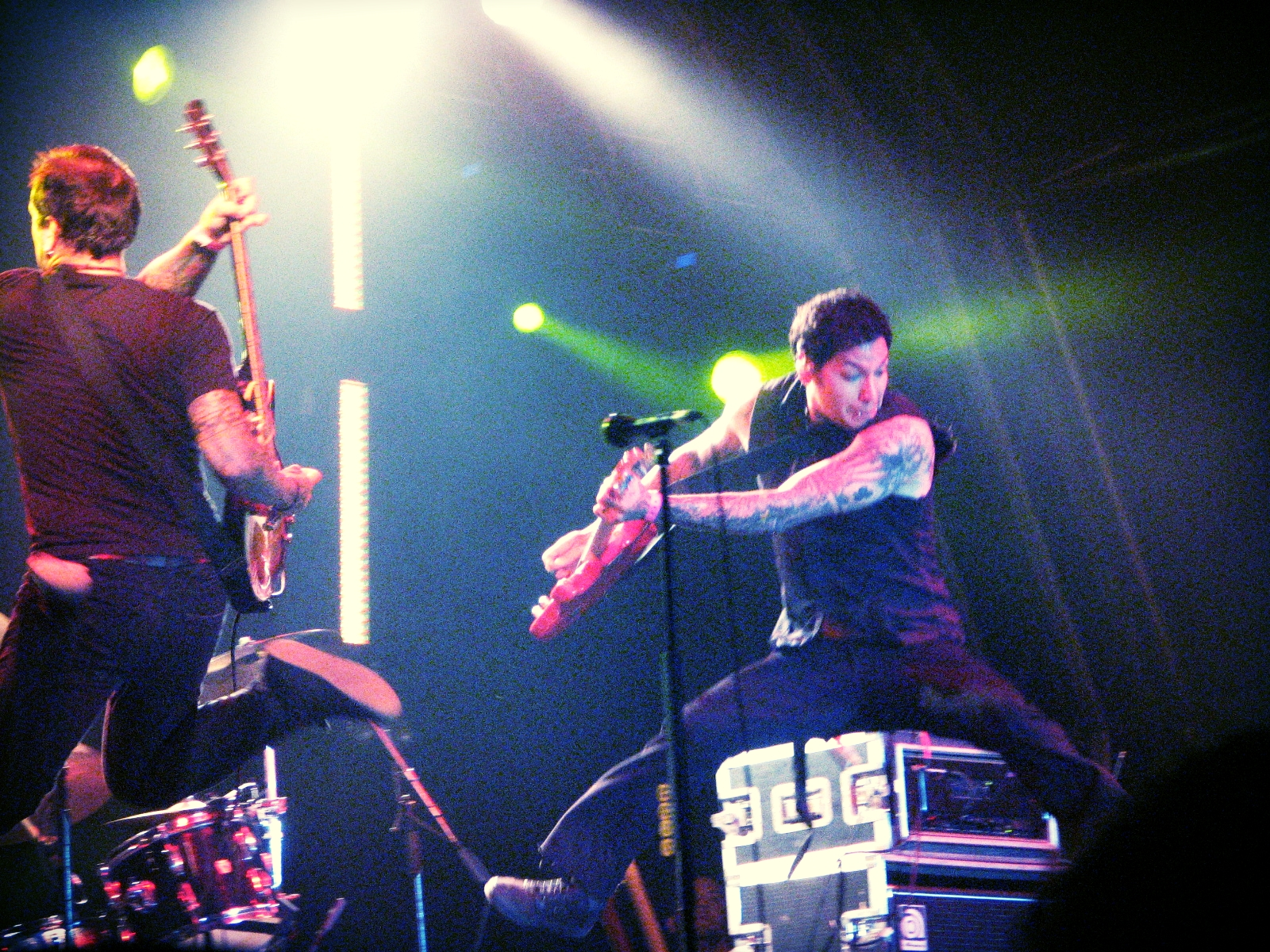
- MxPx performing in 2008, showing Tom Wisniewski and Mike Herrera

Background information
- Also known as: Magnified Plaid
- Origin: Bremerton, Washington, U.S.
- Genres: Punk rock; pop-punk; skate punk; Christian punk (early)
- Years active: 1992–present
- Labels: Tooth & Nail; A&M; Fat Wreck Chords; SideOneDummy; Rock City Recording Company
- Spinoffs: Arthur
- Members: Mike Herrera; Yuri Ruley; Tom Wisniewski; Chris Adkins
- Past members: Andy Husted
- Website: mxpx.com

MxPx (/ˌɛmɛksˈpiːɛks/) is an American punk rock band from Bremerton, Washington, formed in 1992 as Magnified Plaid. The lineup currently consists of Mike Herrera (bass guitar, lead vocals), Yuri Ruley (drums, percussion), Tom Wisniewski (lead guitar, backing vocals), and Chris Adkins (rhythm guitar, backing vocals). The band's discography includes twelve studio albums, four EPs, four compilation albums, a live album, a VHS tape, a DVD and 20 singles. A number of the group's releases have charted on Billboard, including the Billboard 200 and No. 1 on Billboard Christian Albums.

== History ==
=== Early start (1992) ===
MxPx was formed in Bremerton, Washington in July 1992 by Mike Herrera, Yuri Ruley, and Andy Husted, who were 15 years old at the time, playing their first show in Herrera's parents' backyard. Herrera and Ruley were classmates at Central Kitsap High School in Silverdale, Washington, and Husted attended South Kitsap High School in Port Orchard, Washington.

The group was originally called Magnified Plaid, which was a tribute to Husted's fascination with plaid shirts, but did not fit on the band's posters. Consequently, the name was abbreviated to M.P. on show posters. Yuri Ruley, who used Xs in place of periods, made the posters for the band, resulting in the four-letter moniker.

=== Tooth & Nail years (1993–1997) ===
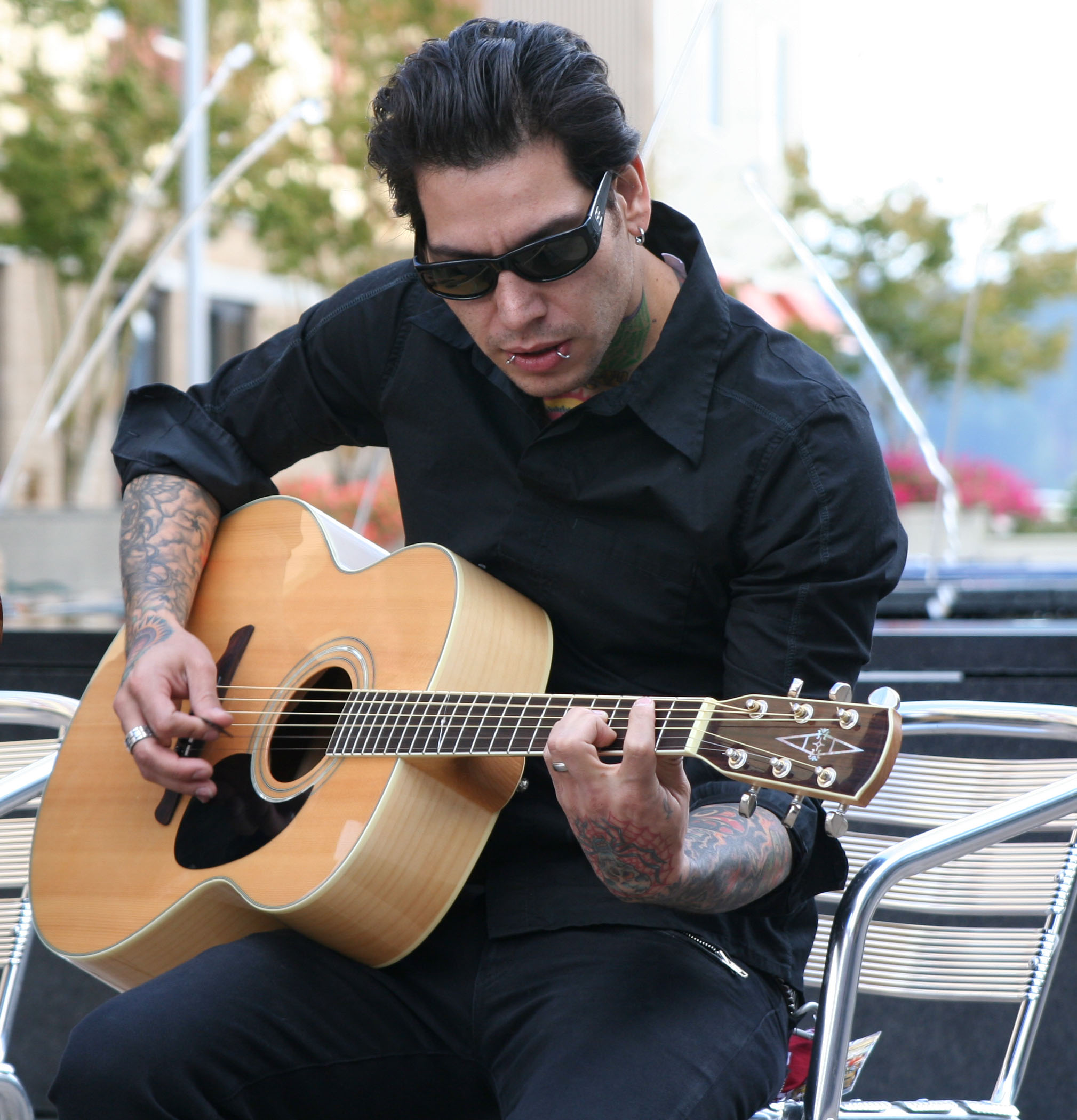
Band bassist Mike Herrera performing "Move to Bremerton" in 2006

MxPx recorded a four-song 7-inch record with Aaron Sprinkle in Seattle, who played it for Brandon Ebel of Tooth & Nail Records. The band then played a showcase for the label in 1993 in Herrera's parents' garage. The band's first major album, Pokinatcha (1994), was released while the band members were still in high school. The album, though classified as Christian punk, incorporated the quick styles of hardcore punk, and is composed of influence from skate punk and punk underground. Their debut album is characterized by their raw punk sound, catchy rhythm, and classic punk three-chord guitar style.

Guitarist Andy Husted soon left the band and was replaced by a friend, Tom Wisniewski. Despite only knowing power chords on guitar, Wisniewski was willing to be in the band. MxPx released two further albums with Tooth & Nail: Teenage Politics in 1995, and Life in General in 1996, which features the single "Chick Magnet" and artwork by the artist Coop.

=== A&M years (1997–2004) ===
In 1997, MxPx signed a deal with A&M Records. This record deal saw the re-release of 1996's Life in General. MxPx then released two more studio albums, the first, Slowly Going the Way of the Buffalo was released in 1998. The album peaked at No. 99 on the Billboard 200 and was certified gold on January 27, 2000, by the RIAA. The band first appeared on Kevin Lyman’s Vans Warped Tour in 1997 alongside Blink-182, The Descendents and more, and went on the full tour in 1998 alongside Bad Religion, Rancid, NOFX, and many others.

In 1999, they released At the Show, their first live album recorded on August 24, 1998, at the 930 Club in Washington, DC and on August 25, 1998, at TLA in Philadelphia, Pennsylvania. At the time of the recording, the band was touring in support of Slowly Going the Way of the Buffalo as well as the B-sides collection Let it Happen, also released in 1998.

The Ever Passing Moment was released in May 2000 via A&M Records. The band gained critical recognition for this album and landed a slot supporting the Offspring and Cypress Hill on the Conspiracy of One tour. "Responsibility" proved to be a radio hit, peaking at #24 on the Billboard Modern Rock chart. The video, directed by The Malloys, features the band messing around and causing mayhem while caddying at a golf course, and also includes an appearance by Cheers star George Wendt. The song was featured in the Daria Television Movie Is It Fall Yet?.

The band once again joined the cross-country Vans Warped Tour in 2002 alongside Bad Religion, NOFX, Reel Big Fish, and more.

The band's version of the song "Scooby Doo, Where Are You?" is in the soundtrack of the 2002 movie Scooby-Doo. MxPx toured alongside New Found Glory and Good Charlotte on the annual Honda Civic Tour in May and June 2003. The group's studio album Before Everything & After, was released by A&M in 2003. The album achieved the band's highest ever chart position on the Billboard 200, peaking at No. 51.

On August 20, 2004, MxPx joined My Chemical Romance, Pennywise, and “many bands from previous tours” to perform at the Vans Warped Tour 10-year celebration show in Foxborough, Massachusetts at the Gillette Stadium near Boston.

The group provided the song "The Empire" for The Passion of the Christ: Songs, which won the Gospel Music Association 2005 Dove Award for Special Event Album of the Year.

=== SideOneDummy years (2005–2006) ===
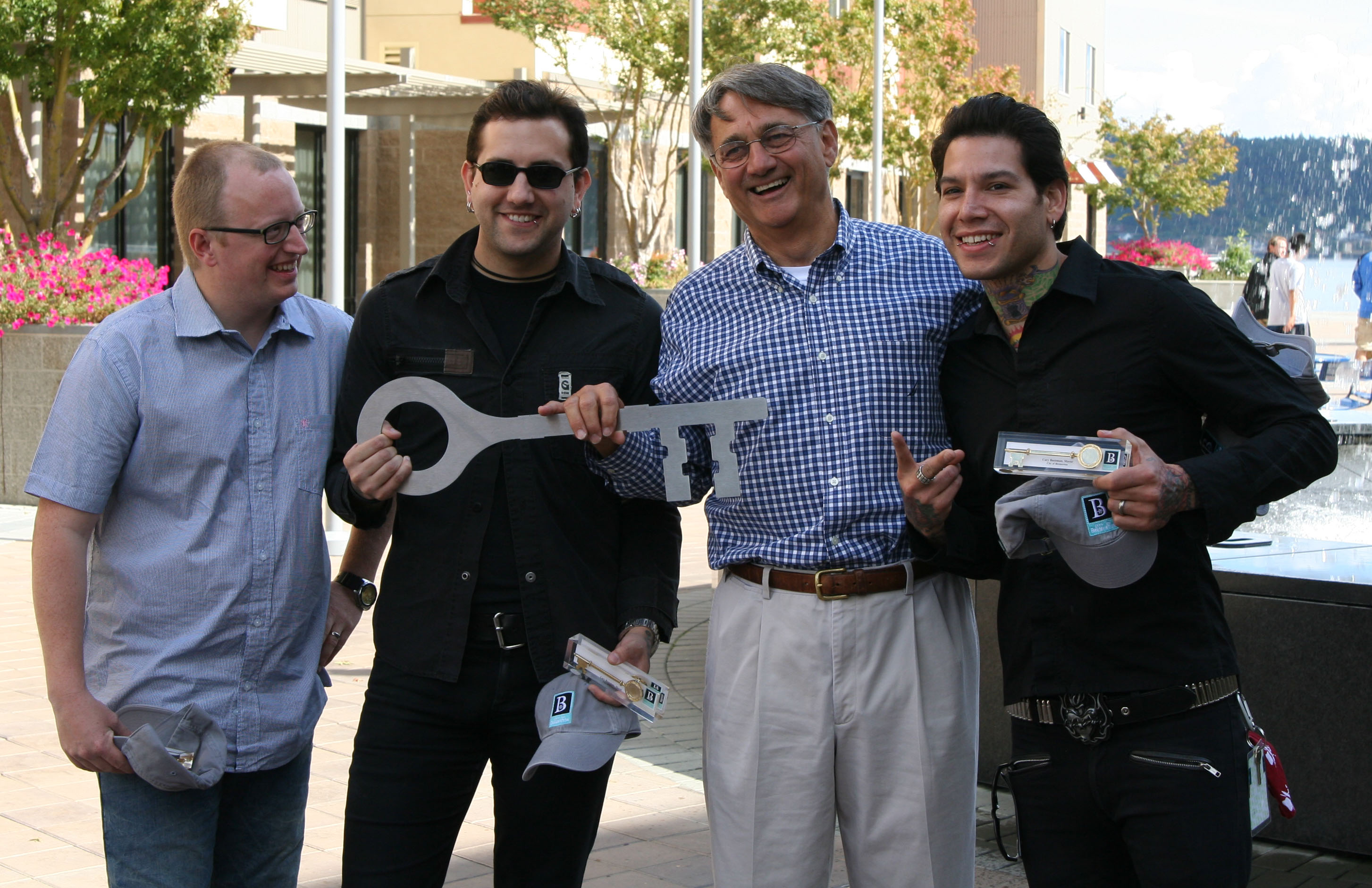
L to R: Yuri Ruley, Tom Wisniewski, Mayor Cary Bozeman, Mike Herrera (the band receiving the Key to Bremerton in 2006)

In 2005 MxPx was dropped by A&M, signed with SideOneDummy Records and then released their seventh full-length album Panic in June. Panic turned out to be a breakthrough moment for the band when their single "Heard That Sound" proved a radio hit. It also featured the Blink-182/+44 singer-bassist Mark Hoppus on "Wrecking Hotel Rooms." Panic heightened the return of the band's skate punk/punk-rock roots sound. In support of Panic, MxPx joined the 2005 Vans Warped Tour alongside supergroup Transplants, Fall Out Boy, The Offspring, and more.

In September 2006, MxPx and the City of Bremerton started a marketing effort revolving around the band's song "Move to Bremerton". The band was given keys to the city by Mayor Cary Bozeman in recognition of the group's contributions to the city.

MxPx spent the majority of 2005 and 2006 touring in support of the band's 7th album Panic. On November 21, 2006, Tooth & Nail Records re-released Let It Happen, an earlier rarities compilation, in a "Deluxe Edition" which included a bonus DVD featuring 12 music videos, new artwork, and two new songs. Let's Rock, MxPx's second rarities album, was released on Side One Dummy Records on October 24, 2006. The album consists of many previously unreleased songs, re-recorded B-sides and acoustic demos.

=== Tooth & Nail and Rock City (2007–2017) ===
MxPx released the full-length album Secret Weapon in 2007, the band's first release on its original label Tooth & Nail since 1996's Life in General. The album debuted at No. 76 on the Billboard 200. The album's sound was a shift back to the group's original punk-rock stylings.

The band appeared on the "Thank You Billy Graham" tribute song, album, and video documentary, respectively.

In 2009, the band released a six-song EP entitled Left Coast Punk EP, which was the first record released by Rock City Recording Company, MxPx's own record label. Also in 2009, the group released a Christmas album, titled Punk Rawk Christmas. In late 2009, Mike Herrera teamed up with frontman of The Ataris, Kris Roe, and Chris Wilson, the drummer of The Summer Obsession and formerly of Good Charlotte, for the MxPx All Stars tour in Japan and Malaysia.

The band released a documentary entitled Both Ends Burning on December 1, 2011. In addition, Mike, Tom, and Yuri were working on their ninth studio album. On December 19, 2011, the band announced that the album would be called Plans Within Plans. It was released on April 3, 2012. In 2012, drummer Yuri Ruley and guitarist Tom Wisniewski announced their retirement from touring. After a brief hiatus, they both returned as full-time members in 2015 and continue to tour with the band today.

In honor of the 20th anniversary Life in General, the band released a re-recorded version free of charge for a limited time on September 18, 2016. It can now be found as Life in General 2.0 on music streaming platforms. In 2017 it was added to the Rolling Stone "50 Greatest Pop-Punk Albums of All Time" article, landing the esteemed record at No. 27.

=== Self-titled album, Southbound to San Antonio, and Find A Way Home (2018–present) ===
After MxPx fulfilled their contractual obligations with former labels, the band moved to return to their DIY roots, taking back control of both their future and lengthy back catalog of music.

On March 29, 2018, the band announced a Kickstarter campaign to fund their tenth full-length studio album. The self-titled album, MxPx, was released July 25, 2018. Before the release of the album, a music video for "Let's Ride" came out at the end of June 2018. The album was performed live on Facebook on the release date.

After its release, "Let's Ride" was added to the relaunched 2020 edition of Tony Hawk Pro Skater 1+ 2 Remastered. According to ScreenRant, MxPx's "Let's Ride" joined new and returning artists for the famous soundtrack that made tracks such as Goldfinger's "Superman" a mainstay.

MxPx went back on tour in 2019 and early 2020, selling out self-booked and promoted tours nationwide. An audio recording at their San Antonio show in early 2020 was captured for a future live album release.

Due to the COVID-19 pandemic, the band were unable to perform live for much of 2020 and 2021. On April 1, 2020, Mike Herrera announced the Life in Quarantine live streams every Friday on the group's official Facebook page throughout April and May. The streams included live performances, Herrera answering fan questions, and more. After concluding the Life in Quarantine series on May 29, 2020, the group took songs from the live recordings and released Life in Quarantine-The Collection on July 3, 2020. The group followed up the collection with a brand new single, "Fever Dream", which was released on July 16, 2020. On October 6, 2020, the group announced they would be starting a new live performance experience separated into various rounds. The first round of the series titled Between This World and the Next premiered on October 16, 2020, in which the band performed a full livestream concert. The group hosted several rounds of Between This World and the Next which featured new tracks, custom set lists, and fan questions.

On March 11, 2021, the band announced the release of their exclusive MxPx Box Collection featuring 10 full-length albums, original album artwork, bonus inserts and album commentary, zoetropic slipmat, hardcover book, and durable outer case. The box set was made available for pre-order on March 19, 2021, and immediately sold out units on the same day. To thank fans for instantly selling out the exclusive box set, the group organized and announced the release of their new single "Can't Keep Waiting" and a free live show hosted on April 16, 2021.

Of "Can't Keep Waiting", Herrera told SPIN Magazine in an interview, "[‘Can't Keep Waiting’] morphed a little bit as we played it on the livestreams, and people kept asking when it was coming out, so we finally were like, ‘OK, we should probably record this thing.’"

In July 2021, MxPx teamed up with Kalie Wolfe of rising band RIVALS to release an upbeat track titled, "Say Yes", which was placed on Five Guys’ streaming station and later featured on Fortnite Radio.

On November 12, 2021, MxPx surprise dropped their new live album Southbound to San Antonio. The album features 23 of the band's live performances from their last in-person show before the pandemic on February 29, 2020. Following the release of Southbound to San Antonio, the group announced that they would be returning to the stage for two special performances on April 1, 2022, in Anaheim, California at House of Blues and the following night on April 2, 2022, in Phoenix, Arizona at the Marquee Theatre.

During a live streaming concert on December 23, 2022, Mike announced that a new album will be out in 2023. On July 6, the band officially announced on their social media platforms that their next album Find A Way Home, would release August 25, with pre-orders up for sale on their website. The lead single, “Stay Up All Night”, was dropped on July 21, with the music video releasing a day prior. Since the release of the album, the band has played several virtual live performances across social media, taking over pages for bands such as Bowling for Soup, Goldfinger, and Less Than Jake.

MxPx announced a new single titled "One Zero Zero", which released on May 16th, 2025, on a split single with Direct Hit!.

== Arthur ==
Arthur is a side project of MxPx featuring all three members of MxPx and their former tech assistant Neil Hundt, who now techs for Pearl Jam. The group released an EP called Loneliness Is Bliss in 1999. The band members went by their middle names: Arthur (where the band name came from), Edmund, Zane, and Alexander (Mike Herrera, Tom Wisniewski, Yuri Ruley, and Neil Hundt, respectively). After over ten years since the inception of Loneliness Is Bliss, the band released a full-length album called Watch the Years Crawl By on December 7, 2010. In 2013 those involved in the project announced that they would be discontinuing the project.

== Musical style and influences ==
MxPx is usually described as a pop-punk band, but has also been labeled as skate punk and punk rock. Originally a punk rock band, by the rise of popularity of pop punk in the late 1990s and early 2000s the group leaned more towards a more pop-punk sound. Albums like The Ever Passing Moment and Before Everything and After were criticized by some fans for its pop-punk style. MxPx's influences include Descendents, NOFX, Bad Religion, Rancid, Social Distortion, All, the Clash, the Dead Milkmen, The Who, Sex Pistols, Black Flag, and the Ramones.

Many of the band's early releases touch on Christian themes and placed them in the front of the Christian punk scene. However, by 2012, "Christian punk" was a genre classification that the band was trying to distance themselves from. As of 2015, MxPx singer Mike Herrera has said he is no longer Christian. When asked about the topic he stated "...do I believe in God? I'm not sure. Do I believe in this exact religion? No I don't."

== Band members ==
Current members

- Mike Herrera – bass guitar, lead vocals, acoustic guitar (1992–present)
- Yuri Ruley – drums, percussion, backing vocals (studio) (1992–2012, 2015–present)
- Tom Wisniewski – lead guitar, backing vocals (1995–2012, 2015–present)
- Chris Adkins – rhythm guitar, backing vocals (2016–present)

Former members

- Andy Husted – lead guitar, backing vocals (1992–1995); backing vocals (studio) (2004–2005)

Touring members

- Jack Parker – rhythm guitar, backing vocals (2015–2016); lead guitar (studio) (2004–2005)

Touring substitutes

- Tristan – lead guitar, backing vocals (2015, 2016; substitute for Tom Wisniewski)

Timeline

== Discography ==
Studio albums

- Pokinatcha (1994)
- Teenage Politics (1995)
- Life in General (1996)
- Slowly Going the Way of the Buffalo (1998)
- The Ever Passing Moment (2000)
- Before Everything & After (2003)
- Panic (2005)
- Secret Weapon (2007)
- On the Cover II (2009)
- Punk Rawk Christmas (2009)
- Plans Within Plans (2012)
- MxPx (2018)
- Find a Way Home (2023)
- Living in Chaos (2027)
