= The Vandals discography =

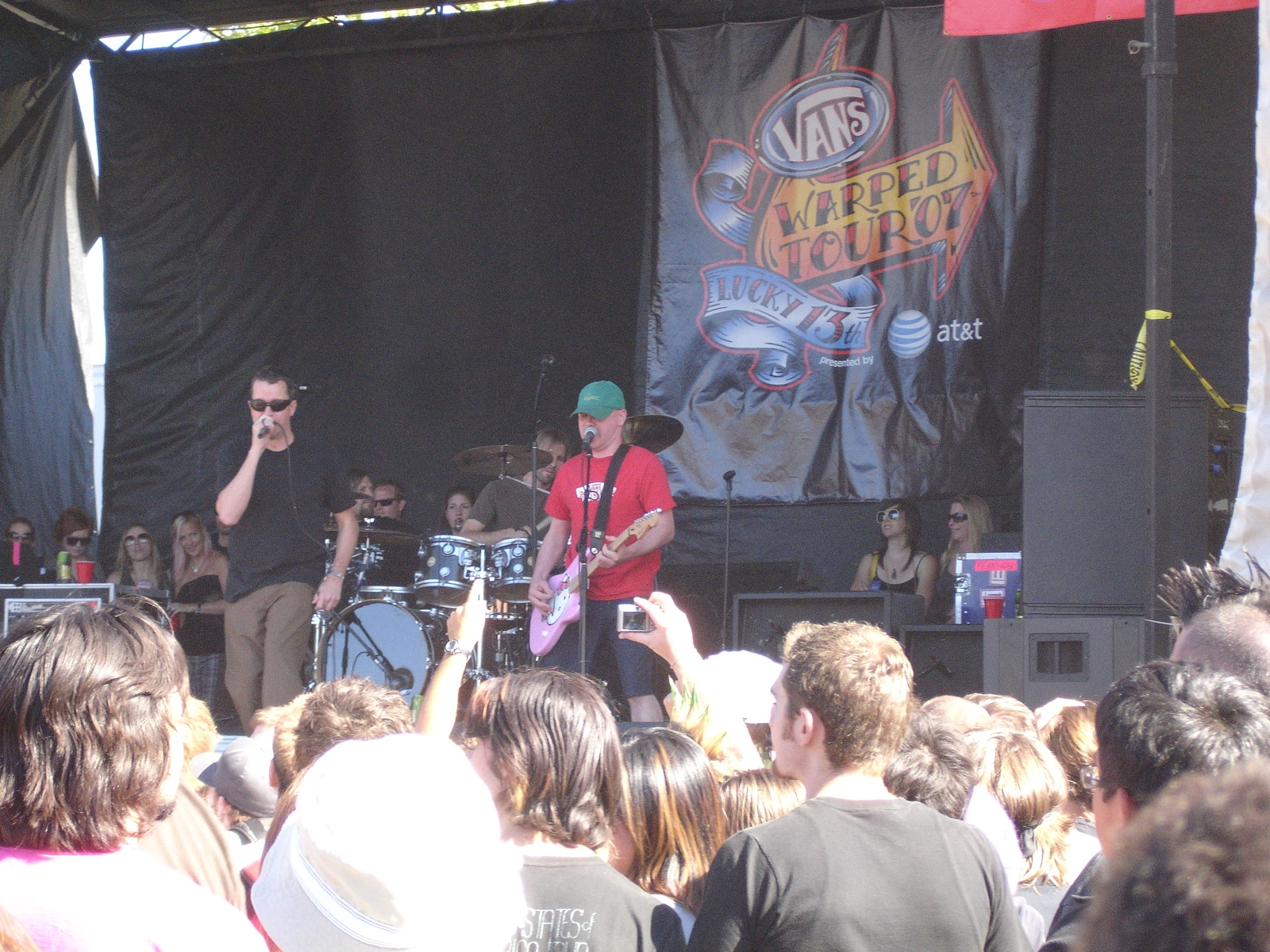
- The Vandals performing on the Warped Tour at the Shoreline Amphitheater in Mountain View, California, 2007
- Studio albums: 10
- Extended plays: 1
- Live albums: 2
- Compilation albums: 3
- Singles: 4
- Video albums: 3
- Music videos: 7
- Remix albums: 1
- Reissues: 4
- Other appearances: 17

The discography of the Vandals, a punk rock band formed in Huntington Beach, California, in 1980, consists of ten studio albums, one EP, two live albums, two compilation albums, one remix album, four reissued albums, three videos, four singles, and seven music videos.

The Vandals formed in 1980 with an initial lineup of singer Steven Ronald "Stevo" Jensen, guitarist Jan Nils Ackermann, bassist Steve "Human" Pfauter, and drummer Joe Escalante. Their debut EP Peace thru Vandalism was released in 1982 on Epitaph Records. Pfauter left the band in 1984 and Brent Turner played on their debut album When in Rome Do as the Vandals, released on National Trust Records in 1984. By the time of their second album Slippery When Ill (1989) on Restless Records Robbi Allen was playing bass and Jensen had been replaced by Dave Quackenbush. The album was country and western-influenced in a style the band called "cowpunk". More lineup changes ensued leaving Esclante and Quackenbush as the only remaining members, with Escalante now on bass guitar. A legal conflict ensued between Escalante and several of the ex-members, partially concerning Time Bomb Recordings' release of the compilation album Peace thru Vandalism / When in Rome Do as the Vandals. Escalante emerged with legal rights to the Vandals name and catalog.

A new incarnation of the Vandals coalesced with the addition of guitarist Warren Fitzgerald and drummer Josh Freese. This lineup would remain consistent for the rest of the band's career, with occasional substitutes filling in for Freese. In 1990 they released Fear of a Punk Planet through Triple X Records and filmed their first music video, for the song "Pizza Tran". In 1994 they released the live album and video Sweatin' to the Oldies. In 1995 the band signed to Nitro Records, who would put out four of their next five albums. Live Fast, Diarrhea was released in 1995, followed by The Quickening in 1996. Also in 1996 Escalante and Fitzgerald founded Kung Fu Records, releasing a Vandals split single with Assorted Jelly Beans and the Christmas album Oi to the World!, and re-releasing Sweatin' to the Oldies in 1997. Nitro released Hitler Bad, Vandals Good in 1998, and Kung Fu released most of Slippery When Ill in 1999 as The Vandals Play Really Bad Original Country Tunes. 2000 saw a trio of releases, with Kung Fu putting out an anniversary edition of Fear of a Punk Planet and re-releasing Oi to the World! while Nitro released the new album Look What I Almost Stepped In...

With their Nitro contract fulfilled the Vandals moved to Kung Fu, releasing Internet Dating Superstuds in 2002 and the live album and DVD Live at the House of Blues in 2003. The Shingo Japanese Remix Album was released in 2005, made up of remixes of Vandals songs by Japanese DJ Shingo Asari. The band's most recent release is the compilation BBC Sessions and Other Polished Turds, a digital-only release through iTunes and Kung Fu in 2008.

== Studio albums ==
Year	Album details
1984	When in Rome Do as the Vandals^{[I]}: Released: 1984; Label: National Trust (NTR 884); Format: LP
1989	Slippery When Ill^{[II]}: Released: April 1989; Label: Restless/Sticky Fingers (Restless #7 72289–2); Formats: CD, LP
1990	Fear of a Punk Planet^{[III]}: Released: 1990; Label: Triple X; Format: CD
1995	Live Fast, Diarrhea: Released: May 1, 1995; Label: Nitro (NITRO 1580–2); Format: CD
1996	The Quickening: Released: July 15, 1996; Label: Nitro (NITRO 15806–2); Format: CD
1996	Oi to the World! Christmas with the Vandals^{[IV]}: Released: October 8, 1996; Label: Kung Fu (KFR 78762–2); Format: CD
1998	Hitler Bad, Vandals Good: Released: June 23, 1998; Label: Nitro (NITRO 15817–2); Format: CD
2000	Look What I Almost Stepped In...: Released: August 29, 2000; Label: Nitro (NITRO 15833–2); Format: CD
2002	Internet Dating Superstuds: Released: September 17, 2002; Label: Kung Fu (KFR 78796–2); Format: CD
2004	Hollywood Potato Chip: Released: June 29, 2004; Label: Kung Fu (KFR 78829–2); Format: CD

I When in Rome Do as the Vandals was reissued on CD by Time Bomb Recordings in 1989 as part of the compilation album Peace thru Vandalism / When in Rome Do as the Vandals.

II Most of the material from Slippery When Ill was re-released by Kung Fu Records in 1999 on The Vandals Play Really Bad Original Country Tunes.

III A tenth-anniversary edition of Fear of a Punk Planet was released by Kung Fu Records in 2000.

IV Oi to the World! was re-released by Kung Fu Records in 2000.

== Live albums ==
Year	Album details
1994	Sweatin' to the Oldies: The Vandals Live^{[I]}: Released: 1994; Label: Triple X; Formats: CD
2004	Live at the House of Blues^{[II]}: Released: January 27, 2004; Label: Kung Fu (KFR 78822–9); Formats: CD, DVD

I Sweatin' to the Oldies was released as both a live album and VHS video. A Special Edition re-release of the album was put out by Kung Fu Records in 1997, and a DVD version of the video was released in 2002.

II Live at the House of Blues is a CD/DVD combination package released as Episode 9 of Kung Fu Films' The Show Must Go Off! series.

== Compilation albums ==
Year	Album details
1989	Peace thru Vandalism / When in Rome Do as the Vandals^{[I]}: Released: 1989; Label: Time Bomb (#70930-43503-2); Format: CD
2008	BBC Sessions and Other Polished Turds^{[II]}: Released: August 12, 2008; Label: Kung Fu; Format: CD, digital download
2020	Curse of the Unripe Pumpkin: Released: July 15, 2020; Label: Kung Fu; Format: digital download

I Peace thru Vandalism / When in Rome Do as the Vandals combines the EP Peace thru Vandalism and the album When in Rome Do as the Vandals.

II BBC Sessions and Other Polished Turds was released only as a digital download through iTunes and Kung Fu Records.

== Extended plays ==
Year	Album details
1982	Peace thru Vandalism^{[I]}: Released: 1982; Label: Epitaph; Format: EP
1996	The Vandals / Assorted Jelly Beans (split EP): Released: 1996; Label: Kung Fu (KFS 7001); Format: 7-inch

I Peace thru Vandalism was reissued on CD by Time Bomb Recordings in 1989 as part of the compilation album Peace thru Vandalism / When in Rome Do as the Vandals.

== Singles ==
Year	Release details
1998	"The Vandals / Longfellow": Released: 1998; Label: Kung Fu; Format: 7-inch single
2000	"Fat Club": Released: 2000; Label: Fat Wreck Chords; Format: 7-inch single
2004	"Fat City Presents...One For the Ages!": Released: 2004; Label: Fat City/Combat Zone (CZR #002); Format: 7-inch single

== Video albums ==
Year	Album details
1991	Sweatin' to the Oldies: The Vandals Live^{[I]}: Released: 1991; Label: Triple X; Formats: VHS
2004	Live at the House of Blues^{[II]}: Released: January 27, 2004; Label: Kung Fu (KFR 78822–9); Formats: DVD, CD

I A DVD version of Sweatin' to the Oldies was released by Kung Fu Records in 2002.

II Live at the House of Blues is a DVD/CD combination package released as Episode 9 of Kung Fu Films' The Show Must Go Off! series.

== Remix albums ==
Year	Album details
2005	Shingo Japanese Remix Album: Released: November 8, 2005; Label: Kung Fu (KFR 78844–2); Formats: CD

== Reissues ==
Year	Album details
1997	Sweatin' to the Oldies: The Vandals Live - Special Edition: Released: 1997; Label: Kung Fu (KFR 78771–2); Formats: CD
1999	The Vandals Play Really Bad Original Country Tunes^{[I]}: Released: 1999; Label: Kung Fu (KFR 78776–2); Formats: CD
2000	Fear of a Punk Planet: Anniversary Edition: Released: 2000; Label: Kung Fu (KFR 78778–2); Formats: CD
2000	Oi to the World!: Released: 2000; Label: Kung Fu (KFR 78777–2); Formats: CD

I The Vandals Play Really Bad Original Country Tunes is essentially a re-release of Slippery When Ill, with 8 of that album's 10 songs plus 2 new ones.

== Music videos ==
Year	Title	Director	Album
1993	"Pizza Tran"	Toby Tilly	Fear of a Punk Planet
1995	"I Have a Date"	Joe Escalante, Jeff Richardson	Live Fast, Diarrhea
1997	"It's a Fact"	Jeff Richardson	The Quickening
2000	"My Girlfriend's Dead"	Jeff Richardson	Hitler Bad, Vandals Good
2002	"My Girlfriend's Dead" (animated)	Luke S. Goljan	Hitler Bad, Vandals Good
2002	"43210-1"	Joe Escalante	Internet Dating Superstuds
2004	"Don't Stop Me Now"	Joe Escalante, Nate Weaver	Hollywood Potato Chip

== Other appearances ==
The following Vandals songs were released on compilation albums, film soundtracks, and other releases. Some songs were later re-released on the BBC Sessions and Other Polished Turds compilation album, as noted below. This is not an exhaustive list: songs that were first released on the band's albums, EPs, or singles are not included.

Year	Release details	Track(s)
1984	Suburbia soundtrack: Released: 1983; Label: Engima; Format: LP	"Legend of Pat Brown" (live)
1985	When Men Were Men and Sheep Were Scared: Released: 1985; Label: Bemisbrain; Format: LP	"Dachau Cabana"; "Frog Stomp"
1989	Phantom of the Mall: Eric's Revenge: Released: September 1989; Label: Fries Entertainment; Format: Film	"Is There a Phantom in the Mall?"^{[I]}
1991	Gabba Gabba Hey: A Tribute to the Ramones^{[II]}: Released: 1991; Label: Triple X; Format: LP with 7-inch, CD	"Sheena Is a Punk Rocker"^{[III]} (originally performed by Ramones); "Judy Is a Punk"^{[III]} (originally performed by Ramones)
1993	Welcome to Our Nightmare: A Tribute to Alice Cooper: Released: 1993; Label: Triple X; Format: CD	"Poison"^{[III]} (originally performed by Alice Cooper)
1996	Glory Daze soundtrack: Released: 1996; Label: Kung Fu (KFR 78761–2); Format: CD	"Theme from Glory Daze"; "Change the World with My Hockey Stick"^{[III]}
1997	We Are Not Devo: Released: 1997; Label: Centipede (CR-003); Format: CD	"The Day My Baby Gave Me a Surprise" (originally performed by Devo)
1997	Generations I: A Punk Look at Human Rights: Released: 1997; Label: Ark 21; Format: CD	"Jilted John"^{[III]} (originally performed by Jilted John)
1999	Short Music for Short People: Released: June 1, 1999; Label: Fat Wreck Chords (FAT 591–2); Format: CD	"To All the Kids"
2000	That Darn Punk Original Motion Picture Soundtrack: Released: March 6, 2001; Label: Kung Fu (KFR 78780–2); Format: CD	"Right on Q"; "My Heart Will Go On" (originally performed by Celine Dion); "Theme from That Darn Punk"
2000	The "Gone With the Wind" of Punk Rock Samplers: Released: October 31, 2000; Label: Kung Fu (KFR 78783–2); Format: CD	"I Don't Think You're a Slut"
2001	Warped Tour 2001 Tour Compilation: Released: June 19, 2001; Label: SideOneDummy (SD 71227); Format: CD	"S.W.M."
2001	Punkzilla: Released: October 16, 2001; Label: Nitro (NITRO 15846–2); Format: CD	"Why Are You Alive?"
2001	download: Released: 2001; Label: Kung Fu; Format: digital download	"You're Not the Boss of Me (Kick It)" (Shingo's Lounge remix)
2001	download: Released: 2001; Label: Kung Fu; Format: digital download	"Ball and Chain"^{[III]} (originally performed by Sublime)
2002	Punk Rock is Your Friend: Released: June 11, 2002; Label: Kung Fu (KFR 78793–2); Format: CD	"I'm Black"^{[III]}
2003	Punk Rock is Your Friend #4: Released: July 1, 2003; Label: Kung Fu (KFR 78817–2); Format: CD	"Count to Ten"
2004	Punk Rock is Your Friend #5: Released: July 13, 2004; Label: Kung Fu (KFR 78832–2); Format: CD	"Lord of the Dance" (Shingo remix)
2004	Mosh Pit on Disney: Released: 2004; Label: Avex Group; Format: CD	"Heigh-Ho"^{[III]}

I No soundtrack album was issued for the film.

III The Vandals tracks only appeared on limited 2 LP release with bonus 7-inch and Japanese CD release. These Vandals tracks were later released on the Longfellow split 7-inch

II Denotes songs that were re-released on BBC Sessions and Other Polished Turds.
