= Punk Rock Is Your Friend: Kung Fu Records Sampler No. 5 =

Punk Rock is Your Friend: Kung Fu Records Sampler #5

Compilation album by Kung Fu Records
- Released: July 13, 2004
- Genre: Punk rock
- Label: Kung Fu Records

Kung Fu Records chronology
Punk Rock is Your Friend: Kung Fu Records Sampler #4 (2003)	Punk Rock is Your Friend: Kung Fu Records Sampler #5 (2004)	Punk Rock is Your Friend: Kung Fu Records Sampler No. 6 (2004)

Professional ratings
Review scores
Source	Rating
Allmusic	link

Punk Rock is Your Friend: Kung Fu Records Sampler #5 is the fifth compilation album by the Seal Beach, California record label Kung Fu Records, released in 2004. It features artists signed to the label at the time, as well as others who were not signed to the label but had participated in some of their releases such as The Show Must Go Off! live DVD series. It also includes audio clips from the Kung Fu Films movie Cake Boy interspersed between the songs. It is an enhanced CD-ROM that also includes several music videos.

== Track listing ==
1. "Merchandise"*
2. Underminded – "It's Kinda Like a Bodybag" (from Hail Unamerican!)
3. "Band meeting"*
4. The God Awfuls – "Watch it Fall" (from Next Stop Armageddon)
5. Underminded – "The Heart of a Traitor" (from Hail Unamerican!)
6. Audio Karate – "Jesus is Alive and Well (And Living in Mexico)" (from Lady Melody)
7. "Ska took a dump"*
8. The Vandals – "How They Getcha'" (from Hollywood Potato Chip)
9. Antifreeze – "Pointless Emotion" (from The Search for Something More)
10. Stiff Little Fingers – "Guitar and Drum" (from Guitar and Drum)
11. "Per diem"*
12. The Adolescents – "Creatures" (live) (from Live at the House of Blues)
13. Useless I.D. – "Pink Stars and Magazines" (from Redemption)
14. Tsunami Bomb – "Roundabout" (Shingo remix) (previously unreleased)
15. "Bofunk"*
16. The God Awfuls – "Power Animal" (from Next Stop Armageddon)
17. The Vandals – "Lord of the Dance" (Shingo remix) (previously unreleased)
18. "LTJ gave us a compliment"*
19. Pistol Grip – "Claustrophobia" (live) (from Live at the Glasshouse)
20. Useless I.D. – "Kiss Me, Kill Me" (from Redemption)
21. Ozma – "Utsukushii Shibuya" (Japanese version) (from Spending Time on the Borderline)
22. "Enthusiasm director"*
23. The Matches – "Chain Me Free" (live) (from Live at the House of Blues)
24. No Use for a Name – "This Ain't No Way to Live" (from the film Cake Boy)
25. Tsunami Bomb – "Dawn on a Funeral Day" (from The Definitive Act)
26. "No talent"*
27. Guttermouth – "1, 2, 3...Slam!" (live) (from Live at the House of Blues)
28. Audio Karate – "Ms. Foreign Friendly" (from Lady Melody)
29. "TBC"*

*Dialogue from the Kung Fu Films movie Cake Boy

== Album information ==
- Record label: Kung Fu Records
