= Punk Rock Is Your Friend: Kung Fu Records Sampler No. 4 =

Punk Rock is Your Friend: Kung Fu Records Sampler #4

Compilation album by Kung Fu Records
- Released: July 1, 2003
- Genre: Punk rock
- Label: Kung Fu Records

Kung Fu Records chronology
Punk Rock is Your Friend (2002)	Punk Rock is Your Friend: Kung Fu Records Sampler #4 (2003)	Punk Rock is Your Friend: Kung Fu Records Sampler #5 (2004)

Professional ratings
Review scores
Source	Rating
AllMusic	link

Punk Rock is Your Friend: Kung Fu Records Sampler #4 is the fourth compilation album by the Seal Beach, California record label Kung Fu Records, released in 2003. It features artists signed to the label at the time, as well as others who were not signed to the label but had participated in some of their releases such as The Show Must Go Off! live DVD series. It was the first of the label's samplers to use a number in its title, as it was the first to repeat the "Punk Rock is Your Friend" title. Interspersed between some of the tracks are clips of comedian Neil Hamburger from his Kung Fu Films release Live at the Phoenix Greyhound Park. It is an enhanced CD-ROM that also includes several music videos.

== Track listing ==
1. Ozma – "Turtleneck Coverup" (from Spending Time on the Borderline)
2. Audio Karate – "Drama Club Romance" (from Space Camp)
3. Tsunami Bomb – "Say it If You Mean It" (from The Ultimate Escape)
4. The God Awfuls – "Disconnected Youth" (from Next Stop Armageddon)
5. The Vandals – "Count to Ten" (previously unreleased)
6. Useless I.D. – "Too Late to Start Over" (from No Vacation from the World)
7. One Man Army – "S.O.S." (live) (from Live at the Troubadour)
8. The Ataris – "Bad Case of Broken Heart" (from End is Forever)
9. Antifreeze – "Useless Words" (previously unreleased)
10. Ozma – "Game Over" (from Spending Time on the Borderline)
11. Audio Karate – "Rosemead" (from Space Camp)
12. The Vandals – "I'm Becoming You" (from Internet Dating Superstuds)
13. Tsunami Bomb – "Top 40 Hit" (from The Ultimate Escape)
14. Useless I.D. – "Bring Me Down" (from No Vacation from the World)
15. Mi6 – "Lezbian Girlfriend" (from Lunchbox)
16. Antifreeze – "Question" (from Four Letter Words)
17. The Ataris – "Take Me Back" (from ...Anywhere But Here)
