= Emily Whitehurst =

American singer

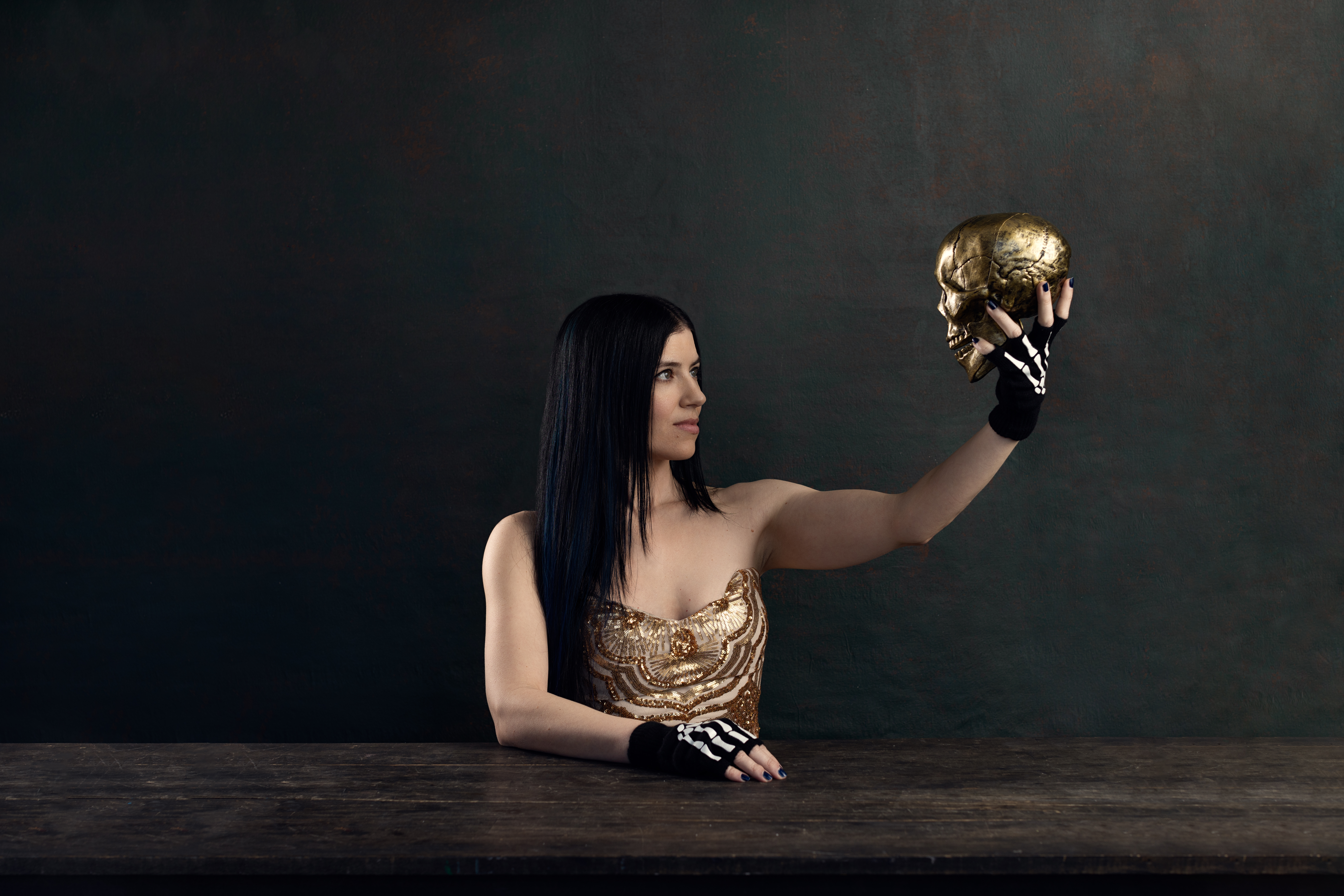
- Whitehurst in a promo for 2023 album Request Hotline, Vol. 2 by comic writer Mike Carey collaborating with cartoonist Peter Gross
- Born: Emily Grace Whitehurst; July 23, 1979 (age 47); Los Banos, California, U.S.
- Occupations: Singer; songwriter; musician
- Musical career
- Origin: California, U.S.
- Genres: Punk rock; pop punk
- Instruments: Vocals; guitar
- Years active: 1998–present
- Labels: Tomato Head; Checkmate; Kung Fu; Epitaph; Your New Boyfriend; Popsmear; Side with Us; Double Helix; Survival Guide
- Member of: The Action Design; Survival Guide
- Formerly of: Tsunami Bomb

Emily Grace Whitehurst (born July 23, 1979), also known as Agent M, is an American singer, songwriter, composer, musician, and record producer. In 1998, she began her music career by fronting the punk rock band Tsunami Bomb. After Tsunami Bomb disbanded in 2005, she co-founded and fronted the Action Design; a rock group. Since then, Whitehurst has been working on her synth-driven indie pop solo project Survival Guide.

== Career ==
Whitehurst joined Tsunami Bomb in 1998 after the departure of original vocalist Kristin McRory. Whitehurst adopted the stage name Agent M at this time, and used it throughout her stay in the band. In 2000, Tsunami Bomb signed to Tomato Head Records and released their debut EP The Invasion from Within!. Their first full-length CD, The Ultimate Escape, followed in 2002. In 2004, the band released a final recording, The Definitive Act, on Kung Fu Records. Tsunami Bomb split up the following year, the members parting on good terms with each other.

Whitehurst and former Tsunami Bomb bassist Matt McKenzie later formed The Action Design with drummer Jake Krohn, and guitarist Jaycen McKissick from Pipedown. Whitehurst said that The Action Design would differ from Tsunami Bomb by embracing a more experimental approach.

Whitehurst has made guest appearances on several other bands' recordings, including the song "My Town and Twins" on Guttermouth's record Gusto. She also performed guest vocal on her brother Logan's album, Goodbye, My 4-Track. Agent M performed a song with The Bouncing Souls when Tsunami Bomb supported them on tour. She performs on MxPx album, On the Cover II, for "Heaven is a Place On Earth".

Whitehurst and Jaycen McKissick (Tsunami Bomb / The Action Design) formed a new project dubbed Survival Guide. The band's debut 7-inch Hot Lather Machine was released on June 30, 2011 via Side With Us Records. Survival Guide's first album, Way To Go, was released in 2015 before the transition to becoming a solo act. Whitehurst's debut as a solo artist was marked by the release of an acoustic album, Live and Alone, followed by covers albums Request Hotline, Vol. 1 (RHV1) and Request Hotline, Vol1.5 (RHV1.5), the latter of which was released on 7" vinyl before being added to the digital release of full-length album, Request Hotline, Vol. 2 (RHV2) released on March 23, 2023.

Whitehurst signed with Arizona-based indie record label Double Helix Records in September of 2022. RHV1.5 and RHV2 were collaborative releases with Whitehurst's own crowdfunded label Survival Guide Records.

== Family ==
Whitehurst is from Los Banos, California. She is the sister of fellow musicians, the late Logan Whitehurst and Eliott Whitehurst of the northern California band Trebuchet.
