= Trust No One =

Trust No One may refer to:

- Trust No One (Dave Navarro album), 2001
- Trust No One (N17 album), 1997
- Trust No One (Hopes Die Last album), 2012
- Trust No One (DevilDriver album), 2016, or the title track
- Trust No One (Tsunami Bomb album), 2016
- "Trust No One", a song by Jeezy from his 2023 album I Might Forgive... But I Don't Forget
- "Trust No One", a slogan from The X-Files
- Trust No One, a book part of The 39 Clues which was released on December 4, 2012 and written by Linda Sue Park
- Trust no one (Internet security), a design philosophy for programming software and Internet applications
- "Trust No One", the phrase from Gravity Falls
- "Trust no one", phrase used prominently twice in the trailer narration for the Charles Bronson film Breakheart Pass, 1975
- Trust No One: The Hunt for the Crypto King, 2022
