= Live at the House of Blues (The Vandals album) =

Live album (with DVD) by The Vandals
- Released: 27 January 2004
- Recorded: July 5, 2003
- Genre: Pop punk; punk rock; skate punk; melodic hardcore; comedy rock
- Length: 56:53
- Label: Kung Fu

The Vandals chronology
Internet Dating Superstuds (2002)	Live at the House of Blues (2004)	Hollywood Potato Chip (2004)

Professional ratings
Review scores
Source	Rating
Allmusic	link

The Show Must Go Off! The Vandals Live at the House of Blues is a live album and video by the southern California punk rock band The Vandals, released in 2004 by Kung Fu Records and Kung Fu Films. It was the band's second official live album and video, the first being 1991's Sweatin' to the Oldies. It was released in 2 packages, one a DVD with a bonus concert CD, the other a CD with a bonus DVD. Both packages contain the same discs and material, merely packaged differently so that it could be stacked on both CD and DVD shelves. It was presented as episode 9 of Kung Fu Films' The Show Must Go Off! live concert DVD series (episode 1 had also been a live Vandals concert, from their 2001 Christmas Formal). Kung Fu Films is an offshoot of Kung Fu Records, the record label started in 1996 by Vandals members Joe Escalante and Warren Fitzgerald. Having previously worked in the television and film industries, Joe Escalante acts as director and producer for nearly all of these live DVD releases.

The performance relies heavily on material from the band's albums since 1990, when the current lineup solidified, and excludes songs from their first three releases of the 1980s. As the current lineup of the Vandals grew in popularity and recognition throughout the 1990s they began to distance themselves from the material performed by earlier incarnations of the band, of which only Escalante remains. These earlier songs tended to attract an older, more violent audience which the current lineup of the band eschewed in favor of newer, younger fans attracted to their more recent output. These early songs had already been released in live format on Sweatin' to the Oldies 13 years earlier, so the band also felt that it would be redundant to rehash that part of their past.

The DVD contains numerous bonus features including band member commentaries (Escalante, Fitzgerald and singer Dave Quackenbush), a photo gallery, hidden bonus footage, English subtitles, links to additional online content, and a "Josh Freese Cam" option that allows the viewer to switch the camera angle at any time during the concert to one focusing directly on drummer Josh Freese, with a picture-in-picture display of his foot pedal.

== Track listing ==
No.	Title	Writer(s)	Length
1.	"43210-1"	Warren Fitzgerald
2.	"Appreciate My Honesty"	Fitzgerald
3.	"It's a Fact"	Fitzgerald
4.	"An Idea for a Movie"	Joe Escalante
5.	"Pizza Tran"	Escalante, Fitzgerald, Dave Quackenbush, Josh Freese
6.	"Café 405"	Freese
7.	"Soccer Mom"	Freese
8.	"The New You"	Fitzgerald, Quackenbush
9.	"Marry Me"	Freese, Quackenbush
10.	"Oi to the World"	Escalante
11.	"N.I.M.B.Y."	Escalante, Fitzgerald
12.	"My Brain Tells My Body"	Freese
13.	"People That Are Going to Hell"	Fitzgerald
14.	"Too Much Drama"	Dexter Holland, Escalante, Freese, Fitzgerald
15.	"Disproportioned Head"	Fitzgerald
16.	"Take it Back"	Quackenbush
17.	"The Unseen Tears of the Albacore"	Escalante, Fitzgerald
18.	"And Now We Dance"	Fitzgerald
19.	"I've Got an Ape Drape"	Escalante
20.	"Behind the Music"	Fitzgerald
21.	"My Girlfriend's Dead"	Fitzgerald
22.	"I Have a Date" (originally performed by the Simpletones)	Jay Lansford
Total length:			56:53

== Personnel ==
- Dave Quackenbush – vocals
- Warren Fitzgerald – guitar, backing vocals
- Joe Escalante – bass, backing vocals
- Josh Freese – drums, backing vocals

== Album information ==
- Record label: Kung Fu Records, Kung Fu Films
- Recorded live at the House of Blues in Anaheim, California on July 5, 2003
