= Trust No One (Tsunami Bomb album) =

Compilation album by Tsunami Bomb
- Released: February 26, 2016
- Recorded: 1999–2000
- Studio: 220Fair, Grizzly Studios, Sawdust Studios, Hyde Street Studios, Fantasy Studios
- Genre: Punk rock, pop punk, melodic hardcore
- Length: 37:44
- Label: Kung Fu Records
- Producer: Chris Lindemann (tracks 3, 8), Logan Whitehurst (2), Dennis MacKay (9–14), Hunter Burgan (1, 4–7)

Tsunami Bomb chronology
The Definitive Act (2004)	Trust No One (2016)	The Spine That Binds (2019)

Professional ratings
Review scores
Source	Rating
Punknews.org	4/5 stars

Trust No One is the first and to date only compilation album of the Californian punk band Tsunami Bomb. The album was released on February 26, 2016 via Kung Fu Records on CD and LP and is the first release of the band since their studio album The Definitive Act (2004, Kung Fu). The album contains songs from the band that were recorded and/or released in 1999 and 2000 on compilation albums, split albums or early EPs. Two songs were previously unreleased demos.

Tsunami Bomb dissolved in 2005 and reunited 10 years later in 2015. The album features the original line-up: bassist/vocalist Dominic Davi, keyboardist Oobliette Sparks, drummer Gabriel Lindeman, and guitarist Brian Plink. Emily "Agent M" Whitehurst decided not to join and to focus on her main solo project, Survival Guide.

== Track listing ==
Track 1 originally appeared on the Springman Records compilation album Punk Rock Strike (2000). Track 2 originally appeared on the B-Movie Queens (1999) split with Plinky. Tracks 4–7 originally appeared on the Mayhem On the high Seas (1999) EP. Tracks 9–14 originally appeared on the EP The Invasion from Within! (2001). Tracks 3 and 8 were previously unreleased demos.

1. "Lemonade (1999)" - 2:31
2. "Irish Boys" - 2:48
3. "Obligation" - 2:50
4. "3 Days & 1000 Nights" - 2:25
5. "Rotting Vampire Eyeballs" - 1:04
6. "Cantare Del Morte (The Halloween Song)" - 3:28
7. "Breakaway" - 2:58
8. "Mushy Love Song" - 4:18
9. "The Invasion From Within" - 2:25
10. "No One's Looking" - 2:42
11. "No Good Very Bad Day" - 1:46
12. "Marionette" - 3:05
13. "Lemonade" - 2:24
14. "...Not Forever" - 3:00

== Performers ==
- Agent M - vocals
- Dominic Davi - bass, vocals
- Oobliette Sparks - keyboards, vocals
- Gabriel Lindeman - drums
- Brian Plink - guitar
