= The Vandals Play Really Bad Original Country Tunes =

Studio album by The Vandals
- Released: 1999 (original released in 1989)
- Genre: Cowpunk, comedy rock
- Label: Kung Fu Records

The Vandals chronology
| Hitler Bad, Vandals Good (1998) | The Vandals Play Really Bad Original Country Tunes (1999) | Fear of a Punk Planet - Anniversary Edition (2000) |

Professional ratings
Review scores
| Source | Rating |
|---|---|
| Kerrang! | 2/5 stars |

The Vandals Play Really Bad Original Country Tunes is an album by the southern California punk rock band The Vandals, released in 1999 by Kung Fu Records. Essentially a re-release of their 1989 album Slippery When Ill, it contains 8 of the 10 songs from that album along with 2 newer, previously unavailable songs. Part of the impetus for its release was that the original Slippery When Ill, long asked for by the band's fans, had become very rare and difficult to obtain due to the small size of the record labels it was originally released on. With their Kung Fu label (founded in 1996 by Vandals members Joe Escalante and Warren Fitzgerald) now firmly established, the band was able to re-release this music from ten years earlier in their career.

The original Slippery When Ill album represented a turning point in the history of the Vandals. It was their first album to feature Dave Quackenbush on vocals, who would remain the band's singer throughout the rest of their career. It was also something of a departure from the punk rock formula of their previous releases, fusing a country and western style with their humorous brand of punk. The result was a sound the band called "cowpunk" which somewhat mocked the resurgence in popularity of country music in their native Huntington Beach. Two exceptions were the songs "Shi'ite Punk" and "(Illa Zilla) Lady Killa," which relied heavily on scratch boxes. These songs were left off Country Tunes and replaced with the more country-sounding "Play That Country Tuba, Cowboy" and "Complain." "Shi'ite Punk" was re-issued the following year on the special anniversary re-release of their album Fear of a Punk Planet.

== Lack of credits ==
Although no credit is given to the performers in the album's liner notes (except "all songs written by the Vandals unless otherwise noted"), the band's 1989 lineup should be credited with making the original recordings used here, as it differed substantially from their 1999 incarnation. From the information provided in the liner notes of the original release Slippery When Ill it can be deduced that the performers on the first eight tracks of Country Tunes are Dave Quackenbush on vocals, Jan Nils Ackermann on guitar, Robbie Allen on bass, and Joe Escalante on drums.

Mininmal credits are given for the last two songs on the album. Stan Freese is credited as the writer of "Play That Country Tuba, Cowboy", which is a re-recording of a song he performed on Hee-Haw. He is the father of Josh Freese, drummer for the Vandals since 1990, and is also an accomplished tuba player who contributed to the band's 1998 album Hitler Bad, Vandals Good. He sings and plays tuba on the song, although it is unclear who provided the rest of the musicianship and backing vocals. Likewise no credit is given for "Complain," except that it is "from the film Bob Roberts". Bob Roberts is the title of a 1992 movie starring, written and directed by Tim Robbins, in which he plays a right-wing folk singer running for political office. "Complain" is one of the songs performed by Robbins in the film, and it is covered on this album by the Vandals. Based on the dates of the film and of the band's involvement with the Freese family, it is most likely that the band's lineup of Dave Quackenbush, Warren Fitzgerald, Joe Escalante and Josh Freese (a lineup which has remained intact since 1990) should receive credit for the performances on these last two songs. However, no specific recording or production information is given.

== Track listing ==
1. "Clowns Are Experts (At Making Us Laugh)" (Escalante/T. Murphey) originally performed by E-13
2. "Susanville" (Escalante/Ackermann)
3. "Desert Woman" (Escalante/Ackermann)
4. "In America" (Charlie Daniels/F. Edwards/J. Marshall/C. Hayward/T. Crain/T. Digregorio; originally performed by the Charlie Daniels Band)
5. "Elvis Decanter" (Escalante/Allen)
6. "Goop All Over the Phone (Pleasant All Over the Bill)" (Escalante/Ackermann)
7. "Gator Hide" (Escalante/Ackermann)
8. "Long Hair Queer" (Escalante/Quackenbush)
9. Play That Country Tuba, Cowboy (Stan Freese)
10. Complain (Tim & David Robbins)

== Performers ==
- Dave Quackenbush - vocals
- Jan Nils Ackermann - guitar, backing vocals
- Robbie Allen - bass, backing vocals, second guitar on "In America"
- Joe Escalante - drums on tracks 1–8, bass on tracks 9 & 10, backing vocals
- Stan Freese - tuba and vocals on track 9
- Josh Freese - drums on tracks 9 & 10

== Album information ==
- Record label: Kung Fu Records
- Tracks 1–8 recorded at The Music Grinder in Hollywood, California 1987–1988
- Tracks 1–8 produced by Thom Wilson
- Track 1 written by Joe Escalante and T. Murhpey. Tracks 2, 3, 6, & 7 written by Joe Escalante and Jan Nils Ackermann. Track 4 written by the Charlie Daniels Band. Track 5 written by Joe Escalante and Robbie Allen. Track 8 written by Joe Escalante and Dave Quackenbush. Track 9 written by Stan Freese. Track 10 written by Tim and David Robbins.
- Art by Mackie Osborne
