= BBC Sessions and Other Polished Turds =

Compilation album by The Vandals
- Released: 12 August 2008
- Genres: Pop punk; punk rock; skate punk; melodic hardcore; comedy rock
- Label: Kung Fu

The Vandals chronology
Shingo Japanese Remix Album (2005)	BBC Sessions and Other Polished Turds (2008)

BBC Sessions and Other Polished Turds is a compilation album by The Vandals, released August 12, 2008 by Kung Fu Records. It was released as a digital download through iTunes and the band's website, as well as on CD in Japan, and finally on CD and Vinyl in the US in 2019. The album collects rare songs by the band from compilations and out-of-print singles, as well as five songs recorded during various sessions at the BBC. It was promoted as "A collection of the band's most rare tracks all sharing one thing in common in that they were recorded when the band didn't give a crap, so they are fun, funny, and unpretentious".

Included are cover versions of songs by the Ramones, Little Jimmy Osmond, the Falling Idols (in which Vandals singer Dave Quackenbush played guitar before joining the Vandals), Supernova, Jilted John, Alice Cooper, Sublime, ZZ Top, and Queen, as well as a cover of the song "Heigh-Ho" from the Walt Disney film Snow White and the Seven Dwarfs which originally appeared on a Japanese Disney tribute album.

In fact, only four of the album's sixteen songs were written by The Vandals. "Change the World with My Hockey Stick" originally appeared on the soundtrack album to the film Glory Daze. The BBC sessions include performances of "My Neck, My Back" from the band's album Hollywood Potato Chip and "Canine Euthanasia" from The Quickening. The album's final track is a remix of "You're Not the Boss of Me (Kick It)" from the album Look What I Almost Stepped In...

The band described the album in typical tongue-in-cheek fashion:

Some may think this is a joke, or a hoax, but over the years the Vandals have indeed recorded over a dozen songs for the BBC, mostly for BBC Radio 1’s Lock-Up Sessions with Mike Davis. Here are some of the best from those sessions featuring some ZZ Top, Sublime, Queen, and a tear jerking piano version of the dead pet lament "Canine Euthanasia."

The cover songs come from ancient Ramones tributes (try to find any better Ramones renditions than these – impossible), lame Alice Cooper tribute albums, and even a Japanese Disney tribute. The gayest of the gay, however, has to be the Vandals version of the song 9 year-old Jimmy Osmond topped the U.K. pop charts with for 6 weeks in 1972 "Long Haired Lover From Liver Pool." Think of this release as 20 years of people asking for extra songs and the Vandals delivering in their own special way.

== Track listing ==
No.	Title	Writer(s)	Original artist	Length
1.	"Sheena Is a Punk Rocker" (from Gabba Gabba Hey: A Tribute to the Ramones)	Joey Ramone	Ramones	2:16
2.	"Judy Is a Punk" (from Gabba Gabba Hey: A Tribute to the Ramones)	Dee Dee Ramone, Joey Ramone	Ramones	1:28
3.	"Long Haired Lover from Liverpool"	Christopher Kingsley	Little Jimmy Osmond	1:57
4.	"Joe" (from The Vandals / Assorted Jelly Beans)	Randy Bradbury	Falling Idols	2:23
5.	"Costa Mesa Hates Me" (from The Vandals / Assorted Jelly Beans)	Art Mitchell, Hayden Thais, Dave Collins	Supernova	2:25
6.	"Jilted John" (from Generations I: A Punk Look at Human Rights)	Graham Fellows	Jilted John	2:36
7.	"Change the World with My Hockey Stick" (from the Glory Daze soundtrack)	Warren Fitzgerald		2:26
8.	"I'm Black" (from Punk Rock Is Your Friend)			2:52
9.	"Heigh-Ho" (from Mosh Pit on Disney)	Frank Churchill, Leigh Harline		2:26
10.	"Poison" (from Welcome to Our Nightmare: A Tribute to Alice Cooper)	Desmond Child, Alice Cooper, John McCurry	Alice Cooper	2:52
11.	"My Neck, My Back" (BBC session)	Fitzgerald		2:51
12.	"Ball and Chain" (BBC session)	Bradley Nowell	Sublime	2:43
13.	"Mexican Blackbird" (BBC session)	Billy Gibbons, Dusty Hill, Frank Beard	ZZ Top	1:45
14.	"Canine Euthanasia" (BBC session)	Fitzgerald		2:52
15.	"Don't Stop Me Now" (BBC session)	Freddie Mercury	Queen	3:12
16.	"You're Not the Boss of Me (Kick It)" (R&B remix)	Dave Quackenbush		4:32
17.	"Urban Struggle" (bonus track on Japanese release)			3:47

== Personnel ==
- Dave Quackenbush – lead vocals
- Warren Fitzgerald – guitar, backing vocals, lead vocals on "Long Haired Lover from Liverpool" and "Don't Stop Me Now"
- Joe Escalante – bass guitar, backing vocals
- Josh Freese – drum kit, lead vocals on "Costa Mesa Hates Me"
- Scott Aukerman – backing vocals on "Heigh-Ho"
