= Mayhem on the High Seas =

EP by Tsunami Bomb
- Released: 1999
- Genre: Punk
- Length: 11:33 minutes
- Label: Checkmate Records
- Producer: unknown

Tsunami Bomb chronology
B-Movie Queens (1999)	Mayhem on the High Seas (1999)	The Invasion from Within! (2000)

Mayhem on the High Seas is the first EP by the punk rock band Tsunami Bomb, and second overall released on the Checkmate label (founded by AFI bassist Hunter Burgan), after their split EP B-Movie Queens with the band Plinky.

== Track listing ==
=== Side one ===
1. "3 Days & 1000 Nights" - 3:30
2. "Rotting Vampire Eyeballs" - 2:53

=== Side two ===
1. "Cantare del Morte" - 4:08
2. "Breakaway" - 1:02
