= Stan Freese =

American musician, bandleader, songwriter and talent booking director

- Born: Stanford Dale Freese; August 21, 1944 (age 82); Muscatine, Iowa, U.S.
- Education: University of Minnesota (BA)
- Occupations: Musician, bandleader, talent booker, entertainment producer
- Years active: 1954–present
- Spouse(s): Patricia Weatherhead (married 1971–1987); Tera Abercrombie (married 2004–present)
- Children: Josh Freese; Jason Freese

Stanford Dale Freese (born August 21, 1944) is an American musician, bandleader, songwriter, and talent booking director best known for his work with The Walt Disney Company.

Born in Iowa and raised in Minnesota, Freese is a tuba player and worked in Disney's theme park division for 45 years—specifically Disney Live Entertainment. He contributed to entertainment projects at the Walt Disney World Resort, Disneyland Resort, and Tokyo Disney Resort as a performer, bandleader, talent booker, show director, and producer. Freese retired from Disney in 2016, but still does entertainment consulting work.

== Early life ==
Stanford Dale Freese was born in Muscatine, Iowa on August 21, 1944, to Ethyl (née Visser) and Harold "Hal" Freese. Freese's parents were both musicians (his mother was a pianist and his father was a trumpet player and bandleader) as well as teachers. When Freese was eight years old, his family moved to Edina, Minnesota (a suburb of Minneapolis), which became Freese's hometown.

Freese first began learning the tuba at age nine on a bet with two elementary school friends. After some instruction from his father, he became quite prolific and spent the next several years competing and performing around the Midwest with school marching bands and as a solo musical comedy act. At age 14, Freese made a solo tuba performance on an episode of Lawrence Welk's Top Tunes and New Talent television show, sharing billing with the Lennon Sisters and Pete Fountain.

== Career ==
=== Early work ===
Freese began his music career as a teenager, playing fairs, nightclubs, and corporate events in the Midwest as a solo act or in a trio with accordion champion Leonard "Skeets" Langley. After graduating from the University of Minnesota with a degree in music education in 1968, Freese became the band teacher at Edison High School in Minneapolis. Even while he was teaching at Edison High School, Freese continued to moonlight as a performer.

In the spring of 1969, Freese was asked by Dr. Frank Bencriscutto, one of his music professors, to accompany Bencriscutto's University of Minnesota Wind Ensemble as a tuba soloist on a goodwill tour of the Soviet Union sponsored by the Bureau of Educational and Cultural Affairs. When they returned from the successful seven-week tour that May, Freese and the band performed for President Richard Nixon and Soviet Ambassador Anatoly Dobrynin in the Rose Garden at the White House.

After receiving a lot of notoriety from his performance at the White House, Freese resigned from his teaching position in early 1971 to work in the Los Angeles area as a session musician.

=== Disney ===
While in Los Angeles, Freese caught the attention of James Christensen, director of bands at Disneyland Park and leader of the park's Disneyland Band. Freese was recruited by Christensen and Bob Jani, vice president of Disneyland live entertainment, for a position at the soon-to-open Walt Disney World Resort, leading the 22-piece Walt Disney World marching band at Magic Kingdom Park.

Freese arrived at Walt Disney World in September of 1971, and helped audition musicians for the marching band, as well as other musical groups for the park and resort hotels. He also participated in the resort's opening festivities on October 25—coordinating the 1,076-piece World Marching Band. Freese was one of a team of conductors helping the massive marching band keep time as they marched up Main Street U.S.A., led by Meredith Willson.

Freese remained at Walt Disney World until the spring of 1974, when Bob Jani transferred him to Disneyland to lead the Disneyland Band. As leader of the Disneyland Band, Freese modernized the band's repertoire, giving the musicians more variety.

In 1983, Freese became a talent booking director at Disneyland—auditioning and hiring musicians and bands for work in the park and special events, as well as forming bands and musical acts based on operational needs. Freese continued as a talent booking director for most of the rest of his Disney career, except for temporary assignments. He also served as a show director and entertainment producer at both Disneyland and the Queen Mary (Disney operated the Queen Mary for a short period in the 1980s and 1990s). In 1990, Freese returned to leading the Disneyland Band for two years, until Art Dragon was selected as the new leader. Freese was also instrumental in forming Billy Hill and the Hillbillies, a fan-favorite bluegrass band that performed at Disneyland from 1987 to 2014. In 2001, Freese became the talent booker and show director for the Downtown Disney shopping complex at the Disneyland Resort, organizing the atmosphere entertainment program.

In his time as a talent booking director, Freese received several temporary assignments at other Disney Parks around the world.

In 1990, Freese was recruited by Disney Live Entertainment executive Ron Logan to return to Walt Disney World and help revamp the faltering Pleasure Island, which had opened the year before. As the entertainment producer, Freese worked with Walt Disney Imagineering to retheme several of the island's nightclubs, change out atmosphere acts, and add the island's nightly New Year's Eve festivities.

Freese was brought on to the Tokyo DisneySea project in the late 1990s by Jim Cora, president of Disneyland International. Cora wanted Freese to oversee the development of park's atmosphere entertainment as a producer and show director. Freese stayed in Japan for several weeks in the lead-up to the park's opening in September 2001 to rehearse and get the acts ready, which included several music ensembles.

When Freese retired from his position at The Walt Disney Company, he became a consultant and instructor for Disney Imagination Campus, the educational program for student performing groups at the Disneyland Resort. Freese leads several of the program's workshops on site.

=== Outside Disney ===
Even while he worked for Disney, Freese still moonlighted on occasion as a musician and performer. From 1977 to 1981, Freese played tuba in the live band for the Ringling Bros. and Barnum & Bailey Circus whenever the traveling show came to the Southern California area.

In 1980, Freese was asked again by the University of Minnesota and Dr. Frank Bencriscutto to appear as a featured tuba soloist in another U.S. government-sponsored international goodwill tour—this time in China. The tour lasted several weeks in June and July, and gained international recognition as the first American concert band to play in China in over 30 years.

In the 1980s and early 1990s, Freese made a few guest appearances on the Nashville-based country-western variety show Hee Haw, performing songs he wrote specifically for the show. Freese performed solo as well as with show co-host Roy Clark as well as Charlie McCoy.

When Freese retired from Disney in 2016, he became a full-time entertainment consultant with clients such as the Pasadena Tournament of Roses and Knott's Berry Farm. For the latter, Freese regularly books talent for Knott's special entertainment programs throughout the year.

Through his two sons, who are also musicians, Freese has had many opportunities to perform with popular musicians and bands. He was a regular guest on albums and in live performances for The Vandals, of which his son Josh is a member. The Vandals covered one of Freese's songs (with Freese performing), "Play That Country Tuba, Cowboy," on their 1999 album, The Vandals Play Really Bad Original Country Tunes. Freese has also played tuba on tracks for Green Day, Mariachi Divas, and Queens of the Stone Age.

== Awards and recognition ==
In 1995, Freese was inducted into the Minnesota Music Hall of Fame. In 1997, he was the recipient of the Classic Conference Fine Arts and Distinguished Service Award. In 2007, Freese was inducted into the Edina Hall of Fame and awarded the Outstanding Achievement Award by the University of Minnesota. Also in 2007, he entered the Guinness Book of World Records as producer of the largest all-tuba ensemble in the world—consisting of over 500 tubas performing in Tubachristmas concert at Downtown Disney. In 2008, Freese received the Disney Entertainment Excellence Award. In 2009 and 2010, he was recognized by the United States Armed Forces School of Music for participation and training of United States Army senior bandleaders for the United States military bands. In 2010, he received the Disney Entertainment Hall of Fame Award and the NAMM Association School JAM USA Award on behalf of the Walt Disney Company. In 2011, he received the Orange County Lifetime Achievement Award. In 2021, Freese received the Lifetime Achievement Award from the International Tuba Euphonium Association.

== Personal life ==
Freese married Patricia Weatherhead, a fellow musician and coed in both high school and college, on June 25, 1971. The marriage produced two sons—Josh and Jason—both of whom are studio and touring musicians. Josh is drummer and a member of The Vandals, Devo, and Foo Fighters. Jason, a keyboardist and saxophonist, is primarily a studio musician and has been touring with Green Day since 2004. The marriage ended in divorce in May of 1987 due to Freese's alcoholism.

Freese has struggled with alcohol addiction since the age of 16. After his divorce, Freese checked himself into rehab and attended Alcoholics Anonymous—remaining sober ever since. Freese now encourages and sponsors friends, coworkers, and family as they go through addiction recovery and AA, including his two sons.

Freese married Tera Abercrombie, whom he met while she worked at one of the stores in Downtown Disney, on September 5, 2004. They live in Placentia, California. Freese has six grandchildren between his two sons.
