= Sweatin' to the Oldies: The Vandals Live =

Live album by the Vandals
- Released: 1994 (re-released 1997)
- Recorded: January 2, 1993
- Venues: The Ice House, Fullerton, CA
- Genres: punk rock, skate punk, melodic hardcore, comedy rock
- Length: Original: 58:10, re-release: 1:06:37
- Labels: Triple X, Kung Fu
- Producer: Warren Fitzgerald

The Vandals chronology
Fear of a Punk Planet (1990)	Sweatin' to the Oldies: The Vandals Live (1994)	Live Fast, Diarrhea (1995)

Sweatin' to the Oldies is a live album and video by the southern California punk rock band the Vandals, originally released in 1994 by Triple X Records. It consists of a live concert recorded at the Ice House in Fullerton, California, as well as interviews with the band members and an overview of their history. The original version was released both on CD and VHS. With most of their back catalogue out of print, the album and video were seen as a retrospective of the band's past, as performed by its most recent stable lineup.

Throughout the set the band performs all 6 songs from their 1982 debut EP Peace thru Vandalism, as well as a few songs from their first album, 1984's When in Rome Do as the Vandals, and a few from their 1990 album Fear of a Punk Planet. Notably absent from the set list are any songs from their 1989 album Slippery When Ill, which was composed primarily of country-style songs. Partway through the song "Wanna Be Manor," the band breaks into a cover of the song "Superficial Love" by T.S.O.L., another Orange County punk band who were contemporaries of the Vandals in the early- to mid-1980s.

In 1999 the album was re-released on the band's own Kung Fu Records label. This "Special Edition" re-release contained 3 bonus tracks not on the original release, which were recorded live on college radio station KUCI 88.9 at the University of California Irvine just prior to the release of their 1996 album The Quickening. The video was re-released by Kung Fu in 2002 as a double-disc DVD with additional performances, band commentary and other bonus material.

Professional ratings
Review scores
Source	Rating
AllMusic	link

== Track listing ==
No.	Title	Writer(s)	Length
1.	"Anarchy Burger (Hold the Government)"	The Vandals
2.	"The Legend of Pat Brown"	The Vandals
3.	"Join Us for Pong"	Joe Escalante, Warren Fitzgerald
4.	"Pizza Tran"	Escalante, Fitzgerald, Dave Quackenbush, Josh Freese
5.	"Master Race (In Outer Space)"	The Vandals
6.	"Wanna Be Manor" / "Superficial Love" ("Superficial Love" originally performed by T.S.O.L.)	The Vandals / T.S.O.L.
7.	"Mohawk Town"	The Vandals
8.	"Ladykiller"	The Vandals
9.	"Girls Turn 18 Every Day"	Escalante, Fitzgerald, Quackenbush, Freese
10.	"Hey Holmes!"	Escalante, Fitzgerald, Chris Lagerborg
11.	"H.B. Hotel" (contains an interpretation of "Heartbreak Hotel" by Elvis Presley)	The Vandals, Elvis Presley, Thomas Durden, Mae Boren Axton
12.	"Pirate's Life"	The Vandals
13.	"Summer Lovin'" (Grease parody)	Escalante, Jim Jacobs, Warren Casey
14.	"Urban Struggle"	The Vandals
15.	"Teenage Idol" (originally performed by Ricky Nelson)	Jack Lewis
Total length:			58:10

Special Edition bonus tracks, recorded live on KUCI
No.	Title	Writer(s)	Length
16.	"(But Then) She Spoke"	Fitzgerald
17.	"N.I.M.B.Y."	Escalante, Fitzgerald
18.	"And Now We Dance"	Fitzgerald
Total length:			66:37

== Personnel ==
- Dave Quackenbush - vocals, guitar on "Teenage Idol"
- Warren Fitzgerald - guitar, vocals on "Teenage Idol"
- Joe Escalante - bass
- Josh Freese - drums

Technical

- Warren Fitzgerald - producer
- Lisa Johnson - photography
- Grace Walker - art direction
