= The Diffs =

American punk band

- Origin: Los Angeles, California, United States
- Genre: Punk rock
- Years active: 2003–present
- Label: SOS Records
- Members: Richie Slick; Paulene; Elvis Kuehn; Max "Maxi Pad" Kuehn
- Website: www.thediffs.net

The Diffs are an American punk band from Los Angeles, California, United States. Founded in 2003, their influences include original Los Angeles punk bands such as Black Flag, the Germs, The Weirdos, and X. Their MySpace page only identifies Ted Nugent as an influence.

The band is featured in the 2007 documentary, Punk's Not Dead.

== Discography ==
- 2005: The Diffs (Self-titled CD)
- 2005: The Diffs: Live at the Key Club (DVD)

== Trivia ==
Brothers Elvis Kuehn and Max Kuehn are the sons of T.S.O.L. keyboardist, Greg Kuehn. They are currently in the band FIDLAR.
