= Disgaea: Hour of Darkness =

2003 video game

- Developer: Nippon Ichi Software
- Publishers: JP: Nippon Ichi Software; NA: Atlus (PS2); PAL: Koei (PS2); AU: Square Enix (NDS); WW: NIS America
- Director: Yoshitsuna Kobayashi
- Producer: Sōhei Niikawa
- Designer: Yoshitsuna Kobayashi
- Composer: Tenpei Sato
- Series: Disgaea
- Platforms: PlayStation 2, PlayStation Portable, Nintendo DS, Microsoft Windows, PlayStation 4, Nintendo Switch, iOS, Android
- Release: January 30, 2003: PlayStation 2; JP: January 30, 2003; NA: August 25, 2003; EU: May 28, 2004; AU: August 30, 2004; NA: January 17, 2013 (PSN); PlayStation Portable; JP: November 30, 2006; NA: October 30, 2007; EU: December 14, 2007; AU: December 20, 2007; Nintendo DS; JP: June 26, 2008; NA: September 23, 2008; AU: April 2, 2009; EU: April 3, 2009; Microsoft Windows; WW: February 24, 2016; Nintendo Switch & PlayStation 4; JP: July 26, 2018; NA: October 9, 2018; EU: October 12, 2018; AU: October 19, 2018; iOS & Android; WW: January 31, 2020
- Genre: Tactical role-playing
- Modes: Single-player, multiplayer

Disgaea: Hour of Darkness (Note: Japanese: 魔界戦記ディスガイア, Hepburn: Makai Senki Disugaia; lit. 'Netherworld Battle Chronicle: Disgaea') is a tactical role-playing video game developed and published by Nippon Ichi Software for the PlayStation 2. Set in a world full of demons and angels, the story follows Laharl, the son of a demon overlord, who upon being awakened after a two-year slumber, aspires to succeed his father's place while also fighting rival demons in the process.

Nippon Ichi has also licensed or produced a wide variety of Disgaea merchandise, including a manga. In 2006, Nippon Ichi released a sequel called Disgaea 2: Cursed Memories for the PlayStation 2, as well as a 12-episode anime adaptation titled Makai Senki Disgaea. A PlayStation Portable version of Disgaea: Hour of Darkness was released entitled Disgaea: Afternoon of Darkness, as was a Windows port titled Disgaea PC. A HD remake, Disgaea 1 Complete, was released for Nintendo Switch and PlayStation 4 and later for iOS and Android.

In 2004, the game received a spiritual sequel, Phantom Brave. Disgaea D2: A Brighter Darkness was released for PlayStation 3 in 2013, and stars the main cast (and additional new characters) of Hour of Darkness.

== Gameplay ==
Disgaea is a tactical role playing game. Battle gameplay takes place on a map divided into a square grid. The player controls a squad of humanoid units and monsters, which each occupy a single square of the grid and do combat with a group of enemies. Depending on the character and attack selected, the player will be able to deal damage to a specific enemy unit or a designated region of the map. Combat ends when all enemy units or all of the player's units are destroyed.

Humanoid characters may lift and throw other units across the map in order to allow allies to move further or force enemies to keep their distance. This even allows the player to capture enemies by throwing them into the base panel; these enemies then become allies, and can be used on subsequent maps. The chance of capturing an enemy in this manner depends on several factors. Failure to capture the enemy will result in the death of all characters inside the base panel, and the enemy will survive.

=== Geo Panels ===
Some maps in Disgaea contain Geo Panels, which are represented as squares on the floor of the map of a particular color. Colored objects on the map known as Geo Symbols may be present on either Geo Panels or regular, uncolored squares on the map. These Geo Symbols can usually be thrown. When a Geo Symbol sits on a Geo Panel, it gives all Geo Panels of the color it sits on a property, such as making all units on them invulnerable, or decreasing the HP of friendly units on those panels by 20% at the end of each turn. When a Geo Symbol is destroyed on a Geo Panel of a different color than its own, it causes panels of that color to change to the color of the Geo Symbol and damages units on those panels. If another Geo Symbol is on one of the panels when it changes, it too is destroyed, and the Geo Panels begin to change color and properties again, creating a chain reaction. This chain reaction can be of any length that can be supported by the number of colors of panel and symbols on the map, the amount of "chain" gained with each square increasing by one every Geo Symbol. The higher the chain, the more the bonus gauge fills. Some Geo Symbols have the color "clear" and cause the Geo Panels to become regular map squares when destroyed. Removing all of the Geo Panels from a map will cause a blast of energy which hurts all enemies on the map and results in large bonuses for the player, referred to in the manual as the Panel Termination Bonus.

=== Laharl's castle ===
Laharl's castle acts as a hub, allowing the player to access the other locations in the game without physically having to travel between the castle and a desired map. Each episode of the game gives the player access to a new set of maps, which must be completed in order to proceed in the plot. With the exception of the Item World and the Dark Assembly, all maps are accessed by speaking to a dimensional gatekeeper. With few exceptions, maps can be accessed and played again at any time, occasionally with minor changes, such as boss levels, where the boss will be replaced by a high level generic enemy.

Disgaea has only one pair of stores where items may be purchased, consisting of an armor shop and a weapon shop within Laharl's castle. These shops are described in-game as the Netherworld branch of the Rosen Queen Co. The overall quality and types of the items sold in these shops can be changed through proposals to the Dark Assembly. A hospital where characters may be healed in exchange for payment is also present in the same area of the castle and rewards Laharl and company by giving them items when they pay specific amounts of money for treatment.

=== Dark Assembly ===
In order to perform specific actions outside of combat the player must address the Dark Assembly. To create new characters, improve the inventory of the castle store, or unlock new maps Laharl or other members of his party must present a proposal to the Dark Assembly, who will vote on whether they should or should not provide aid to Laharl's party. Prior to voting, senators in the assembly represent their predilection toward the party visually, glowing blue if they favor that character or red if they do not. If they are glowing red, senators can be bribed with items from the player's inventory to sway their vote in the player's favor. If a proposal fails to receive sufficient votes, the player may attempt to pass the bill anyway by choosing to "persuade by force" and attempting to defeat opposing senators in battle.

The proposals available to place before the senate depend on the number of promotion examinations completed by a character; these examinations consist of a battle between a handful of monsters and a single character on the floor of the Assembly. Each proposal to the Dark Assembly costs "mana", which is built over time by individual characters as they defeat enemies in combat. The amount of mana gained depends on the enemy's level.

=== Item World ===
Laharl's party may also enter the Item World from the castle, going inside an item in their inventory in order to increase its attributes. The world associated with an item contains up to 100 randomly generated levels. Inside the Item World, monsters called Specialists raise the statistics of the item they are in when defeated. Often, the maps are full of Geo Symbols.

Each floor has a gate, a special map square that can be used to go to the next level in the Item World. However, a monster with the unique class "Gate Keeper" will sometimes block the gate. The Gate Keeper must be defeated or forced to move to use the gate and progress through the Item World. Defeating every monster on the map can also allow the player to progress.

Every ten levels has an item boss. The strongest of each type of weapon and the three ultimate items each contain an Item God 2. Defeating these bosses also increases the attributes of the item. The Item World can only be exited at the end of every tenth level containing an Item Boss, or at any other time by using an item called 'Mr. Gency's Exit', a play on the phrase "Emergency Exit". Since many items contain stronger monsters than are ever found outside the Item World, the Item World is often the only way to acquire rare and powerful weapons.

== Plot ==
The story of Disgaea opens with Laharl rising out of an open coffin in his room. Etna, one of the castle vassals, is standing next to him, surrounded by various weapons. She explains that he has been sleeping for two years, far longer than he intended, and his father, King Krichevskoy, has died. Laharl vows to reclaim the throne, and, after consulting with Etna and his other vassals, goes to Vyers' castle.

After defeating the demon Vyers, who refers to himself as the "Dark Adonis" and is renamed "Mid-Boss" by Laharl, he meets Angel Trainee Flonne. Flonne had been sent to the Netherworld by Seraph Lamington, the ruler of Celestia, to assassinate King Krichevskoy (who was already dead). Shocked by Laharl's lack of grief at his father's death, the eternally optimistic Flonne joins Laharl's party to determine if demons are capable of feeling love. Observing them in secret is the paranoid Archangel Vulcanus, who interprets Flonne's actions as treason and is convinced that she is plotting against him.

After Etna demands that Laharl pay the salary of the Prinnies that she has hired, he decides to attack the demon with the most money in the vicinity. This is Hoggmeiser at Dinero Palace. After defeating Hoggmeiser, Laharl is about to kill him, until Hoggmeiser's son rushes out and gets in the way. Flonne convinces Laharl to spare them, and Laharl lets them keep some of the money. In response to this act, Hoggmeiser joins the party.

At one point, Flonne and Etna discover a photograph of Laharl in an embarrassing situation. Laharl refers to this as a "paparazzi shot", however, the actual contents of the photo are never actually revealed. A threat on the back of the photograph states that copies of it would be distributed if Laharl did not accept a challenge to fight for the overlordship; thus Laharl was blackmailed.

Responding to this challenge, Laharl meets Maderas, a vampire. He was banished by King Krichevskoy, for stealing the King's favorite snack, black pretzels. Maderas takes advantage of Laharl's two biggest weaknesses – optimism and women with sexy bodies. Maderas was also controlling Etna by holding her memory. He had instructed her to kill the prince, but she had put him to sleep for two years by poisoning him instead. Etna eventually betrays Maderas, and along with Laharl, Flonne, and Mid-Boss, defeats him.

Waking up later at night, Flonne discovers that several Prinnies are chanting and leaving the castle. Laharl, worried that his reputation will be tarnished if it is discovered that he let his vassals escape, chases after them the next morning. Eventually, he runs into Death, and the player learns that Big Sis Prinny is actually Laharl's mother; she became a Prinny because she gave her life to save him.

After Laharl becomes the undisputed Overlord of the Netherworld, he meets a group of humans from Earth: Gordon, Defender of Earth; Jennifer, his assistant; and the robot Thursday. Gordon has been led to believe that his mission is to assassinate Laharl due to an impending attack on Earth by the Netherworld. Laharl promises not to invade Earth if Gordon defeats him, on the condition that Gordon becomes one of his vassals if he wins; Gordon is embarrassed by his ensuing loss and servitude. After the Earth Defense Force appears in the Netherworld, it is revealed that Gordon was actually sent to secure a path for an invasion of the Netherworld by the humans, who had been tricked by Vulcanus.

General Carter sends Kurtis to the Netherworld, and eventually goes there himself on the Space Battleship Gargantua. Kurtis abducts Jennifer, and Laharl engages the EDF fleet of spaceships in a rescue attempt, destroying all but the Gargantua by himself. When Laharl and his party arrive at the Gargantua's bridge, several angels from Celestia appear and attack them. After being defeated, General Carter escapes, only to have Mid-Boss appear to give him a message.

In response to this turn of events, Flonne and the rest of the party decide to go to Celestia to confront the Seraph. Vulcanus goes to Seraph Lamington, declares that Flonne is a traitor who is leading an army of demons in an invasion of Celestia, and goes to lead a group of angels to repel this "invasion". Vulcanus reveals to Laharl and his party that he intends to conquer all three worlds and rule over them as a god. After defeating Vulcanus, Laharl finally meets the Seraph and Flonne explains Vulcanus' plan and what she has learnt while travelling with Laharl. The Seraph accepts her version of events and agrees that demons are, in fact, capable of feeling love. However, he declares that Flonne must be punished because she fought against other angels, and turns her into a flower. Outraged at this injustice, Laharl attacks the Seraph, initiating the game's final battle.

The game has multiple endings. Depending on the way the game was played up to this point, the Seraph may or may not survive, Flonne either remains a flower, is restored to her original form, or is transformed into a Fallen Angel, and Laharl either becomes a great Overlord, disappears and leaves Etna in charge of the Netherworld, or dies and becomes a Prinny. It may also be noted that, on the Good Ending, when the spirit of Laharl's mother appears to him, Vyers appears to already know her, and the way he talks to Laharl suggests that he is King Krichevskoy.

There is one "Joke" ending, which can be obtained very early in the game, in Episode 1, if the final boss of the chapter defeats all of the characters in battle, a cutscene will play showing Vyers naming himself Overlord before the ending credits roll. After the ending credits, like with all endings, the game will ask you to save previous data and the player will then be sent to the main menu, where the player can reload the saved data and start a new game +, referred to in-game as a New Cycle.

=== Characters ===
- Laharl (ラハール, Rahāru) is the son of King Krichevskoy, who plans on becoming overlord after his father's death. He is incredibly arrogant, and he always tries to prove that he is the strongest demon in the Netherworld. He becomes physically sick when hearing optimistic sayings, especially "love", and when he sees attractive women.
- Etna (エトナ, Etona) is the leader of the Prinny squad, and one of the few vassals who remain in the Overlord's Castle after King Krichevskoy's death. She serves Laharl, though in a very sarcastic and insincere manner. However, she slowly changes her attitude after Laharl spares her in spite of her betrayal, and becomes more loyal to him (she finally accepts Laharl as an Overlord after he helps a young demon to find his pets), even though she retains her sarcastic nature. She is very abusive toward the Prinny Squad, often using excessive violence and fear to keep them in line.
- Flonne (フロン, Furon) is an Angel Trainee sent on a mission to assassinate Overlord Krichevskoy. After learning that her target is already deceased, she becomes determined to follow Laharl and determine if demons truly are incapable of love. She is very innocent and naive, though she is deeply devoted to Lamington and the concept of spreading love to others. She is obsessed with tokusatsu series.
- Captain Gordon (ゴードン, Gōdon) is the 37th Defender of Earth, sent to the Netherworld to stop a potential invasion. Gordon has a great sense of justice, but is dim-witted. He is also blind to the true intentions of others, and never realizes when he's being tricked until it's too late. However, his sense of justice constantly motivates him even in the darkest hours.
- Jennifer (ジェニファー, Jenifā) is Gordon's beautiful sidekick. Jennifer is a rather attractive woman, and she often jokes around in a very flirtatious manner. Her intelligence and technical knowledge surpasses most scientists, having created a fully functioning robot at the age of five and earned her Ph.D. (according to The World of Disgaea, she obtained all possible Ph.D.s) at the age of ten. Disgaea 3 mentions that Jennifer had solved the BSD Conjecture, a supposedly unsolvable theory, when she was six years old. She is also skilled at martial arts, specifically kung fu.
- Thursday (サーズデイ, Sāzudei) is an "All Purpose Robot" (physically resembling Robby the Robot) created by Jennifer. He is very focused on bringing about justice, even to the point of breaking down. He also seems to be very calm when dealing with various obstacles and can be very sarcastic at times. Thursday usually begins or ends his sentences with 'blip beep'.
- Kurtis (カーチス, Kāchisu) is from Earth, and he views himself as more worthy of the title of Defender of Earth than Gordon. After a traumatic experience that cost him over 70% of his body in addition to his wife and daughter, he becomes a cyborg. He later changes his mind about Gordon, and sacrifices himself to save him. He returns as a green Prinny with cybernetic parts in heaven, and continues to protect Earth in that form.
- Vyers (バイアス, Baiasu) is a flamboyant demon interested in becoming overlord of the Netherworld. He has the self-given title of The Dark Adonis (ビューティー男爵, Byūtī danshaku, lit. Beauty Baron), though Laharl deems him unworthy of the title, and compares him to a mid boss, calling him Mid-Boss (中ボス, Chūbosu, lit. Medium Boss) for the rest of the game, much to Vyers' dissatisfaction. He speaks in a cultured tone, and incorporates multiple French words into his speech. Vyers tends to be very conceited and overly confident in his own abilities. He sees Laharl as a rival, though Laharl doesn't return the sentiment.
- Seraph Lamington (ラミントン, Raminton) is the leader of Celestia. He is very mature and calm, and he never raises his voice or harbors any vindictive thoughts or emotions. He willingly performs evil and underhanded actions, and he is willing to allow fate to punish him.
- Vulcanus (ブルカノ, Burukano) is a full-fledged angel of Celestia, and he is an archangel, who serves Seraph Lamington as the second-in-command. His ideals and methods are much more extreme compared to others, and he has a hot temper that differs from other Angels. He holds demons in contempt and believes that humans are too stupid to live without the guidance of angels.
- General Carter (カーター, Kātā) is the adoptive father of Jennifer and the acting leader of Earth. Under the guidance of Archangel Vulcanus, he sends Gordon, Jennifer, and Thursday to act as a beacon for the Earth forces to invade the Netherworld for colonization. Despite his good intentions for Earth, Carter is willing to sacrifice many lives to achieve his goals.
- Big Sis Prinny (姉御肌のプリニー, Anegohada no Purinī) is a pink Prinny, who acts as a mother-figure to others. She does not speak like other Prinnies, notably leaving out the word "dood."
- Hoggmeiser (ゼニスキー, Zenisukī) is the former vassal of Krichevskoy. Upon Krichevskoy's death, Hoggmeiser steals huge amounts of treasure from the Overlord's castle, and builds his own mansion with that fortune. He has a son named Porkmeister.
- Maderas (マデラス, Maderasu) is a vassal of Krichevskoy, who is exiled after stealing Krichevskoy's black pretzels. Maderas is one of the many demons competing for the throne. He uses memories stolen from Etna to force her to work for him.
- Baal (超魔王バール, Chō Maō Bāru) is a legendary overlord sealed by King Krichevskoy a number of years before the start of the storyline. Known as the Lord of Terror, he is a large demon that uses large swords to attack. After being defeated, he is reincarnated as an "Uber Prinny", which only growls and causes explosions with every attack.

== Development ==
Disgaea's North American release allows the player to select either English or Japanese for the audio and soundtrack. The song "The Invasion From Within" by Tsunami Bomb was licensed for the English audio track by Atlus due to its organ opening and fast pace, and is only played when English is the selected language. The option to select the language is not present in the European release of the game, because the European release used a lower capacity storage medium that the Japanese version also used (CD instead of DVD).

Souhei Niikawa and Yoshitsuna Kobayashi, the game's producer and main programmer, have explained the intended humor of Disgaea; they give the example of Captain Gordon being a satire of American comic book characters. Episodes of the game are separated by previews, parodying such previews at the end of anime series episodes. Most of these have voice-overs by Etna and do not accurately reflect the plot of the next episode; one of the characters calls these previews Etna's fantasies. The game is also filled with Prinnies, penguin-like creatures that explode when thrown. More information on their origins is revealed as the game progresses – they contain human souls and labor in the Netherworld and Celestia to atone for their sins. Character designer Takehito Harada described the prinny design as becoming less realistic as development continued.

The makers of Disgaea have responded that characters represented by 3-D models in other games are often limited by a "set pattern of motions", and they were able to make the characters of Disgaea more expressive with sprites.

There were two different styles of boxart for the American release.

== Reception and awards ==
Reception

Aggregate scores
Aggregator	Score
GameRankings	86%
Metacritic	84/100

Review scores
Publication	Score
1Up.com	B
Game Informer	8.75/10
GameSpot	8.1/10
GameSpy	4/5
IGN	9.4/10

Awards
Publication	Award
IGN	PS2: Best Game No One Played
GameSpy	PS2: Strategy Game of the Year

In the PS2 category of IGN's The Best of 2003 awards, Disgaea: Hour of Darkness won "Best Game No One Played", and won Reader's Choice and runner-up awards for "Best Strategy Game". Hyper's Daniel Wilks commends Disgaea: Afternoon of Darkness for its "brilliant strategy and being huge and funny". The game received a score of 8.5/8/7.5 from Electronic Gaming Monthly, and the magazine's Shane Bettenhausen said, "Here's an instant cult classic—Disgaea is so creative, challenging, and funny that it totally deserves the attention of RPG gamers". However, he noted that its "rewarding gameplay and quirky humor beneath a coating of antiquated visual grime. There isn't much here that couldn't have been done on PS1".

In the PS2 category of GameSpy's Game of the Year awards, it ranked ninth out of ten, and won "Strategy Game of the Year". During the 7th Annual Interactive Achievement Awards, the Academy of Interactive Arts & Sciences nominated Disgaea for "Console Role-Playing Game of the Year", which was ultimately awarded to Star Wars: Knights of the Old Republic.

The success of Disgaea: Hour of Darkness has launched a franchise that has seen seven sequels, several spin-offs, and adaptations into other media.

== Re-releases ==
=== Disgaea: Afternoon of Darkness ===
Reception

Aggregate scores
Aggregator	Score
GameRankings	88%
Metacritic	87/100

Review scores
Publication	Score
1Up.com	B
GameSpot	8.0/10
GameSpy	5/5
IGN	9.0/10

A port for the PlayStation Portable named Disgaea Portable (魔界戦記ディスガイア PORTABLE, Makai Senki Disugaia Pōtaburu) was released in Japan on November 30, 2006. It was later released in North America on October 30, 2007, under the name Disgaea: Afternoon of Darkness.

Afternoon of Darkness features extras over the original, such as a 16:9 format to take advantage of the PSP's widescreen display. There is also a mode that focuses on Etna as the main character. In Etna Mode, Etna kills Laharl by accident while trying to wake him in the beginning of the game and thus becomes the main character. There are some extra boss battles such as Overlord Zetta from Makai Kingdom and Rozalin and Adell from Disgaea 2. There is, for the first time, a multiplayer mode available through Ad-hoc connections. This features multiple modes such as a "Defeat the Leader," "Capture the Flag," and the original "Battle." In the Multiplayer mode, each player also has access to "Geo Cubes" which give different effects to the battlefield. Other new additions include a music shop, which allows the player to listen to the game's various songs and even change the Item World theme, and a record keeper, which keeps track of various bits of information such as ally kills and obtained items.

In addition, Afternoon of Darkness includes an option to turn off battle animations. Most of the silent Japanese cut scenes now include voice acting. However, when set to English, the scenes that were originally silent in the PS2 release are still silent. To reflect Etna's recent voice actor change, her lines have been re-recorded to match Michelle Ruff's portrayal of Etna in Disgaea 2 and the anime. One notable omission is the theme song "The Invasion from Within" by Tsunami Bomb. As Atlus was the publisher of the original PS2 version and arranged for the licensing of the song, and NIS America (Nippon Ichi's American branch) published the PSP port themselves, they did not retain the rights to use the song and did not renegotiate for them. Also missing is the song "One With the Stars" which, like "The Invasion from Within", was added in the original PS2 release by Atlus.

=== Disgaea DS ===
Reception

Aggregate score
Aggregator	Score
Metacritic	82/100

Review scores
Publication	Score
1Up.com	C+
GameSpot	8.0/10
IGN	9.0/10

On March 5, 2008, Weekly Famitsu reported an official announcement of Disgaea DS (魔界戦記ディスガイア 魔界の王子と赤い月, Makai Senki Disugaia Makai no Ōji to Akai Tsuki; "Netherworld Battle Chronicle Disgaea: The Prince of the Netherworld and the Red Moon") for the Nintendo DS.

On March 7, NIS America released a statement on the North American release of a new edition of Disgaea: Hour of Darkness for the Nintendo DS titled Disgaea DS. The game would be a port of the PSP version, and would include multiplayer gameplay and Etna Mode. In order to fully utilize the Nintendo DS' capabilities, several key improvements will be made to the user interface and game system. However, many features from the PSP edition were dropped, including the option to toggle between English and Japanese dialogue, and many additional voiceovers, probably due to the limited storage capacity of the DS game card. Disgaea DS was the only Disgaea game released for a Nintendo system (and until the release of Disgaea PC, the only release on a non-Sony platform), until the release of Disgaea 5 Complete for the Nintendo Switch in 2017, 9 years after Disgaea DS's release.

The Nintendo DS version contains the following additional features:

- Geo Cubes – A new addition first found in the PSP version, Geo Cubes are magic items that add more depth to multiplayer battles. They can be used to enhance abilities, summon monsters, or to attack the enemies.
- Demon Gadgets – Randomly generated items that appear on the battlefield. Units can power up by acquiring these gadgets. Some demon gadgets can level up a unit by 30 levels at once.
- Unlockable Characters – As well as the unlockable characters from the original Disgaea, Adell and Rozalin from Disgaea 2 are unlockable as hidden bosses within the Cave of Ordeals, as well as the Dark Assembly guide, Pleinair. Overlord Zetta also debuts as an unlockable, playable character.

Disgaea DS was released in North America on September 23, 2008, through distributor NIS America and in Europe on April 3, 2009.

=== Disgaea PC ===
Reception

Aggregate score
Aggregator	Score
Metacritic	74/100

Review score
Publication	Score
PC Gamer (US)	61%

A version of Disgaea: Hour of Darkness, including the added content in Afternoon of Darkness, was released for Microsoft Windows via Steam on February 24, 2016, retitled as Disgaea PC. The initial release was panned by critics on launch due to its many bugs, which included persistent crashes, save file loss, and poor performance, even on high-end PCs. A patch was released soon afterwards that fixed many of the bugs. Another patch was released for the game later that added the four characters previously exclusive to Disgaea DS. Players who bought the game during the 2016 Steam Summer Sale would also earn free in-game cosmetic items for Valve’s first person shooter game Team Fortress 2.

=== Disgaea 1 Complete ===
Reception

Aggregate score
Aggregator	Score
Metacritic	NS: 76/100; PS4: 83/100

Review score
Publication	Score
TouchArcade	4/5

A version of Disgaea: Hour of Darkness, including the added content in Afternoon of Darkness and Disgaea PC, was released for Nintendo Switch and PlayStation 4 on October 9, 2018, retitled as Disgaea 1 Complete. Some elements of the game were updated, including adding new higher resolution sprites in the same style as Disgaea 5, changing character art images with the Disgaea 5 artstyle, as well as retroactively replacing some generic humanoid and monster classes that did not appear since Disgaea: Hour of Darkness with classes that do appear in later games in the series. An iOS/Android port was released on the January 31, 2020 worldwide.
