= Peace Thru Vandalism / When in Rome Do as The Vandals =

Compilation album by The Vandals
- Released: 1989
- Recorded: 1982, 1984
- Genre: Punk rock, comedy rock
- Length: 46:01
- Label: Restless Records (original), Time Bomb Recordings (reissue)
- Producer: Thom Wilson

The Vandals chronology
Slippery When Ill (1989)	Peace Thru Vandalism / When in Rome Do as The Vandals (1989)	Fear of a Punk Planet (1990)

Professional ratings
Review scores
Source	Rating
Allmusic	link
Robert Christgau	link

Peace Thru Vandalism / When in Rome Do as The Vandals is a compilation album by the American punk rock band The Vandals. It was originally released in 1989 by Restless Records (and later reissued Time Bomb Recordings, a record label founded by Social Distortion frontman Mike Ness). It is a CD re-release of the band's first EP, Peace thru Vandalism, and first LP, When in Rome Do as The Vandals, containing all of the tracks from both releases. The Restless version has the tracks from When In Rome Do As The Vandals first while the Time Bomb version has the two records in chronological order.

In the album's liner notes Brent Turner is credited as having performed all of the bass tracks on When in Rome Do as the Vandals, however by the time of that album's release Chalmer Lumary had joined the band on the bass position. Lumary is therefore listed in the liner notes as the band's official bass player. The liner notes also erroneously list Joe Escalante as writing and composing the entirety of the album's content, whereas the majority was written by Stevo and Jan Nils Ackermann. Furthermore, many tracks from Peace Thru Vandalism had been written and performed prior to Escalante's involvement in the band, adding to the suspicious nature of the inclusion.

== Track listing ==
1. "Wanna Be Manor" (Ackermann/Jensen)
2. "Urban Struggle" (Ackermann/Jensen)
3. "The Legend of Pat Brown" (Ackermann/Jensen)
4. "Pirate's Life" (Ackermann/Escalante)
5. "H.B. Hotel" (originally performed by Elvis Presley) (Presley/Durden/Axton)
6. "Anarchy Burger (Hold the Government)" (Escalante/Jensen)
7. "Ladykiller" (Escalante/Jensen)
8. "Birthday Bash" (Escalante/Jensen)
9. "Master Race (In Outer Space)" (Escalante/Jensen)
10. "Big Bro vs. Johnny Sako" (Escalante/Jensen/Ackermann)
11. "Mohawk Town" (Ackermann/Jensen)
12. "Viking Suit" (Escalanete/Jensen/Ackermann)
13. "Hocus Pocus" (originally performed by Focus)
14. "I'm a Fly" (Escalante/Jensen/Ackermann)
15. "Slap of Love" (Ackermann/Jensen)
16. "Airstream" (Escalante/Jensen)
17. "Rico" (Ackermann/Jensen)

Writing credits are as they appear on the original Restless Records CD. Later versions credit all songs to Joe Escalante.

== Performers ==
- Steven Ronald "Stevo" Jensen - vocals, scratch box on "Ladykiller"
- Jan Nils Ackermann - guitar, acoustic guitars on "Mohawk Town" and "Rico"
- Steve Pfauter - bass (tracks 1–6)
- Brent Turner - bass (tracks 7–17)
- Joe Escalante - drums, trumpet on "Rico"
- Brett Gurewitz - backing vocals on "Anarchy Burger (Hold the Government)"
- Chalmer Lumary - backing vocals (tracks 7–17)

== Album information ==
- Record label: Restless Records, Time Bomb Recordings (reissue)
- Produced by Thom Wilson
- All songs written by The Vandals, copyright 1982, 1984 and 1989 Greco Roman Publishing, except "H.B. Hotel" by Elvis Presley and "Hocus Pocus" by Focus.
- Front cover art by Fritz Quadrata and Art Bad
- Back cover art & design by Mike Doud
- Back cover photos by Alan Newberg
- Original Pressings have When In Rome Do As The Vandals played before Peace Thru Vandalism while later issues have Peace Thru Vandalism played first.
