= The Invasion from Within! =

The Invasion From Within

EP by Tsunami Bomb
- Released: February 27, 2001
- Genre: Punk rock, pop punk
- Label: Tomato Head Records
- Producer: Dennis MacKay

Tsunami Bomb chronology
| Mayhem on the High Seas (1999) | The Invasion From Within (2001) | The Ultimate Escape (2002) |

Professional ratings
Review scores
| Source | Rating |
|---|---|
| AllMusic | link |

The Invasion from Within! is the third EP by Tsunami Bomb, released in February 2001.

== History ==
The Invasion from Within! would be the band's only release on Tomato Head Records but is the label's best-selling album. After this release, the band signed to the larger independent label, Kung Fu Records. The title track was used in Atlus USA's release of the strategy RPG Disgaea: Hour of Darkness. The song is noticeably absent in the Japanese audio track. Because only Atlus owned the rights to the song, it is not present in parts of the game such as Disgaea: Afternoon of Darkness and Disgaea 1 Complete, which were not published by Atlus.

== Track listing ==
1. "The Invasion from Within" – 2:25
2. "No One's Looking" – 2:42
3. "No Good Very Bad Day" – 1:46
4. "Marionette" – 3:05
5. "Lemonade" – 2:25
6. "...Not Forever" – 3:00
