= The Definitive Act =

Studio album by Tsunami Bomb
- Released: September 21, 2004
- Recorded: Camp Street Studios, Cambridge, Massachusetts
- Genre: Punk rock
- Length: 36:19
- Label: Kung Fu Records
- Producer: Michael Poorman

Tsunami Bomb chronology
The Ultimate Escape (2002)	The Definitive Act (2004)	Trust No One (2016)

Professional ratings
Review scores
Source	Rating
Punknews.org	4.5/5 stars

The Definitive Act is a studio album by Tsunami Bomb, released in 2004.

== Track listing ==
1. "Dawn on a Funeral Day" – 3:08
2. "Being Alright" – 3:03
3. "5150" – 2:44
4. "Safety Song" – 2:12
5. "I Bought You" – 3:13
6. "4 Robots and an Evil Scientist" – 1:24
7. "A Lonely Chord" – 3:58
8. "Epic" – 3:33
9. "Negative One to Ten" – 3:04
10. "My Machete" – 2:54
11. "Tetanus Shot" – 2:45
12. "Jigsaw" – 4:21
