= Fear of a Punk Planet =

Studio album by The Vandals
- Released: 1990
- Recorded: 1990
- Studios: Paramount in Hollywood, California and Master Control in Burbank, California
- Genres: Punk rock, comedy rock
- Length: 32:38
- Label: Triple X
- Producer: Bob Casale

The Vandals chronology
Peace Thru Vandalism / When in Rome Do as The Vandals (1989)	Fear of a Punk Planet (1990)	Sweatin' to the Oldies: The Vandals Live (1994)

Fear of a Punk Planet is the third album by the southern California punk rock band The Vandals, originally released in 1990 by Triple X Records. It was their first album to include the lineup of Dave Quackenbush, Warren Fitzgerald, Joe Escalante and Josh Freese, solidifying the band's roster after several years of fluctuation. This lineup would remain intact for the rest of the band's career, and for this reason Fear of a Punk Planet is considered by many fans to be the first proper album by the "new" Vandals. The album returned the band to their punk rock sound, after having played mostly in a country style on their previous album Slippery When Ill. The band would stick to a punk rock formula throughout the rest of their career. The album's title called to mind the rap album Fear of a Black Planet by Public Enemy, released that same year. It featured guest appearances by Dweezil and Moon Unit Zappa, Scott Thunes and Kelsey Grammer. An independent music video was filmed for the album's first track, "Pizza Tran."

The album was re-released with bonus tracks in 2000 by the band's own label Kung Fu Records in order to celebrate its tenth anniversary.

All Music Guide published a mostly positive review by Victor W. Valdivia, who commented "Even if the constant juvenile humor grates after a while, the Vandals are still more composed and entertaining than most."

== Reception ==
Professional ratings
Review scores
Source	Rating
AllMusic	3/5 stars
Ox-Fanzine	Favorable

== Track listing ==
No.	Title	Writer(s)	Length
1.	"Pizza Tran"	Joe Escalante, Warren Fitzgerald, Dave Quackenbush, Josh Freese	2:29
2.	"The Rodge"	Escalante, Fitzgerald, Quackenbush	4:06
3.	"Join Us for Pong"	Escalante, Fitzgerald	2:45
4.	"Hey Holmes!"	Escalante, Fitzgerald, Chris Lagerborg	2:45
5.	"Girls Turn 18 Every Day"	Escalante, Fitzgerald, Quackenbush, Freese	2:47
6.	"Kill My Tenant"	Escalante, Quackenbush	2:24
7.	"Summer Lovin'" (Grease parody)	Escalante, Jim Jacobs, Warren Casey	2:45
8.	"The Day Farrah Fawcett Died"	Escalante	2:23
9.	"Anti"	Fitzgerald, Quackenbush	2:04
10.	"Teenage Idol" (originally performed by Ricky Nelson)	Jack Lewis	1:47
11.	"Small Wonder"	Escalante, Fitzgerald, Quackenbush	4:35
12.	"Phone Machine"	Escalante, Fitzgerald, Quackenbush	1:42
Total length:			32:38

Anniversary Edition bonus tracks
No.	Title	Writer(s)	Length
13.	"Shi'ite Punk" (from Slippery When Ill)	Quackenbush, Jan Nils Ackermann
14.	"China Town"
15.	"Working for the Man"
16.	"Kokomo" (originally performed by The Beach Boys)	Mike Love, Scott McKenzie, Terry Melcher, John Phillips
Total length:			43:33

== Personnel ==
- Dave Quackenbush - vocals
- Warren Fitzgerald - guitar
- Joe Escalante - bass
- Josh Freese - drums
- Dweezil Zappa - lead guitar on "Hey Holmes!"
- Moon Unit Zappa - female vocals on "Summer Lovin'"
- Scott Thunes - bass on "Kill My Tenant"
- Kelsey Grammer - piano and vocals on "Phone Machine"
- DJ Gary - sampling on "The Rodge"

== Album information ==
- Record label:
  - original release: Triple X Records
  - Anniversary Edition re-release: Kung Fu Records
- Recorded at Paramount Studios in Hollywood, California and Master Control in Burbank, California
- Mixed by Gary McGachan and Andrew Ballard at Master Control Assistants.
- Produced by Bob Casale
- Art direction:
  - original release: Steve Martinez
  - re-release: Sergie
- Cover art by Rudolph Schwarzkogler, courtesy of the Gallery Krinzinger in Vienna
- Photographs by Mollye Moore, assisted by Elena Ray and Melody
- All songs published by Puppety Frenchman publishing SESAC except "Teenage Idol" by Nelson Music ASCAP, "Summer Lovin'" by Edwin H. Morris Music ASCAP, and "Kokomo" by Buena Vista Music Co., Clairaudient Music Corp., Daywin Music Inc. & Spirit One Music.
