= Audio Karate =

American rock band

- Origin: Rosemead, California, United States
- Genres: Punk rock; pop-punk; indie rock; alternative rock
- Years active: 1995–2005; 2018–present
- Labels: Kung Fu; Wiretap; Hidden Home; A-F Records; Iodine Recordings
- Members: Arturo Barrios; Jason Camacho; Justo Gonzalez; Gabriel Camacho; Jake Smith
- Website: www.audiokarateisback.com

Audio Karate is an American rock band from Rosemead, California.

== History ==
Audio Karate signed to Kung Fu Records in fall 2001. They put out their debut album, Space Camp, on May 14, 2002. The album featured the songs "Nintendo 89," "Rosemead," and "Senior Year." After the release of Space Camp, Audio Karate toured the world with bands such as The Ataris, NOFX, Blink-182. In November and December, the group went on the Kung Fu Records 2002 tour in the US and UK alongside The Vandals and Tsunami Bomb. This was followed by a European leg in January and February 2003. In late June, the group appeared on the Warped Tour.

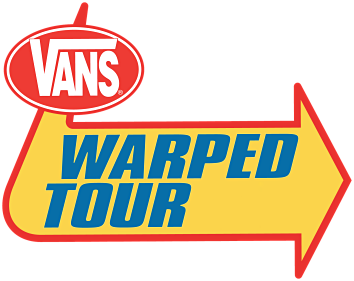
Audio Karate appeared during the Warped Tour.

In January 2004, the group played on the Japanese leg of Warped Tour. After the heavy touring, the band decided to take a break to write their next record. The result was an album named Lady Melody that was produced by Bill Stevenson of the Descendents. "Jesus Is Alive and Well (and Living in Mexico)" was posted online on April 3, 2004. A music video was released for the song on May 7, 2004. They went on a US tour with Denver Harbor, who dropped off partway through the trek and was replaced by Dynamite Boy and Sing the Body Electric. Lady Melody was originally scheduled for release on May 18, it was eventually released on June 1, 2004 on Kung Fu Records. Lady Melody is considered a much darker and angrier record than Space Camp. In June and July 2004, the band toured with Say Anything, Lances Hero, and MC Lars. In August and September 2004, they went on tour with Tsunami Bomb, Pipedown and Time in Malta. At the end of the year, the band announced that they would take a "vacation".

On October 15, 2006 Audio Karate updated their fans via a blog entry on their MySpace page. The entry stated that vocalist/guitarist Arturo Barrios & guitarist Jason Camacho are writing the soundtrack to an independent movie titled "Maquillaje", a dark movie about botched love and suicide. It is directed by Marcial Rios, a friend of the band. The film is done entirely in Spanish. The music that they are writing for the movie doesn't sound like the typical Audio Karate songs; most of the songs have been fueled by heavy drinking. They also mentioned that they are working on a new album, but they don't know when it will be coming out, or when they will be able to go on tour again. On November 7, 2008, two songs were posted on the group's Myspace profile, "Lovely Residence" and "I Don't Know Sorry".

In 2009, the band resurfaced and reunited, releasing several new tracks through their Myspace page, but with no further news of an album release. On January 5, 2011 Gabriel posted on Twitter, "Audio Karate 2011 back in the Studio.... Interesting news to the 6 followers i have! Somebody get this twitter thing spreadin the word!" Audio Karate can be followed @theAudioKarate. News of the return surfaced on Absolutepunk.net on January 13, 2011 As of July 11, 2011 the band formerly known as Audio Karate has picked up a new guitar player and piano player and has officially changed their name to Indian School. The new Indian School EP Titled "The Cruelest Kind" was released physically in January 2012 by Walnut Tree Records in the UK, and digitally by Ewok Teeth Records in the US.

"The Cruelest Kind" was re-released on vinyl on September 25, 2012. Indian School is attempting to raise money for a tour bus using the website Kickstarter. As of May 2014, Indian School is in the process of recording their debut album.

In March 2018, after the account lay dormant for nearly 6 years, the Audio Karate Twitter account, @theAudioKarate, posted that they were “Pickin’ up the instruments this year.”, and in April, it was announced that Audio Karate would be reforming to tour with the punk band Descendents.

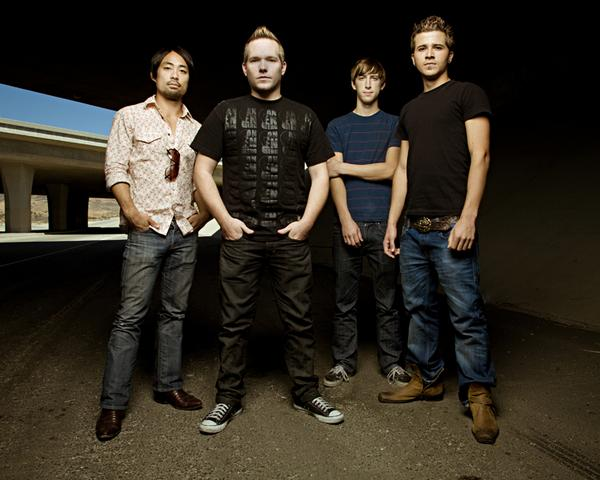
The band Rufio.

The band announced in September 2018 that they would be releasing a self-titled, two-song EP on the 28th made up of recordings from sessions that took place some time after the release of 2004's Lady Melody, recorded at their studio of the same name in Montebello, CA. The sessions yielded 13 songs, including three with Rufio drummer Mike Jimenez. The EP, Audio Karate, includes two of these songs.

On August 28, 2019 Audio Karate announced that they will release their third full-length album, Malo, on October 18 of that year through Wiretap Records, A-F Records, and SBAM Records. This will be the band's first full-length album in 15 years. Along with this announcement, the band released the music video for the album's first single, "Sin Cuchillo."

The band released their fourth full-length album, ¡Otra!, on March 18, 2022 via Iodine Recordings.

== Band members ==
- Arturo Barrios - vocals, guitar (1995–2005, 2018–present)
- Justo Gonzalez - bass, backing vocals (1995–2005, 2018–present)
- Gabriel Camacho - drums, percussion (1995–2005, 2018–present)
- Jason Camacho - guitar (1995–2005, 2018–present)

== Discography ==
Albums

- Demo (2000)
- Space Camp (May 14, 2002)
- Lady Melody (June 1, 2004)
- The Cruelest Kind (EP) (January 2012) (as Indian School)
- Audio Karate (EP) (September 28, 2018)
- Malo (October 18, 2019)
- ¡Otra! (March 18, 2022)
- A Show of Hands (EP) (June 30, 2023)
