= The Ultimate Escape =

Studio album by Tsunami Bomb
- Released: September 3, 2002
- Recorded: 2001–2002
- Genre: Punk rock; pop punk
- Length: 37:00
- Label: Kung Fu Records
- Producer: Steve Kravac

Tsunami Bomb chronology
| The Invasion from Within! (2000) | The Ultimate Escape (2002) | The Definitive Act (2004) |

Professional ratings
Review scores
| Source | Rating |
|---|---|
| AllMusic | 4.5/5 stars |

The Ultimate Escape is the first full-length album by Tsunami Bomb, released in 2002. "Take the Reins" was the first single from the album. It also has enhanced CD-ROM features including a live video of the band playing their song "No Good Very Bad Day". The album also spawned the first featured video of the band for the single "Take the Reins".

== Track listing ==
1. "Take the Reins" – 3:05
2. "Russian Roulette" – 2:32
3. "Say It If You Mean It" – 3:20
4. "Roundabout" – 3:04
5. "Top 40 Hit" – 2:22
6. "20 Going On..." – 4:05
7. "The Simple Truth" – 3:59
8. "Headlights on a Handgrenade" – 3:10
9. "Count Me Out" – 0:49
10. "El Diablo" – 3:05
11. "In This Together" – 3:12
12. "Swimming Through Molasses" – 4:22
