= Slippery When Ill =

Studio album by The Vandals
- Released: April 1989
- Recorded: 1987–1988 at The Music Grinder in Hollywood, California
- Genres: Cowpunk, comedy rock
- Length: 36:51
- Labels: Restless, Sticky Fingers

The Vandals chronology
When in Rome Do as The Vandals (1984)	Slippery When Ill (1989)	Peace Thru Vandalism / When in Rome Do as The Vandals (1989)

Slippery When Ill is the second album by the Huntington Beach punk rock band The Vandals, released jointly in 1989 by Restless Records and Sticky Fingers Records. It was their first album to include Dave Quackenbush on vocals, who would remain the band's singer for the rest of their career. The album was something of a departure from the punk rock formula of their previous releases, fusing a country and western style with their humorous brand of punk. The result was a sound the band called "cow punk" which somewhat mocked the resurgence in popularity of country music in their native Huntington Beach. Two exceptions were the songs "Shi'ite Punk" and "(Illa Zilla) Lady Killa," which relied heavily on scratch boxes. The latter song was a re-recording of the song "Ladykiller" from the band's previous album When in Rome Do as the Vandals with slightly altered lyrics.

Robbie Allen is credited in the album's liner notes as having performed all of the bass tracks on the album, but by the time of its release original member Joe Escalante had moved from Drums into the bass position. Escalante had played drums on the album, but when he switched to bass Doug Mackinnon joined the band as their new drummer. The photo in the album's liner notes indicates Escalante as the band's bass player and MacKinnon as their drummer.

The exact date of release for this album is unknown, with some sources indicating it was released in late 1988.

Most of the album's songs were re-issued in 1999 by Kung Fu Records on the album The Vandals Play Really Bad Original Country Tunes. The song "Shi'ite Punk" was re-issued in 2000 on the anniversary re-release of their 1990 album Fear of a Punk Planet, also on Kung Fu Records.

== Track listing ==
No.	Title	Writer(s)	Length
1.	"Clowns Are Experts (At Making Us Laugh)" (originally performed by E-13)	Joe Escalante, T. Murphey	4:03
2.	"Susanville"	Escalante, Jan Nils Ackermann	4:29
3.	"Desert Woman"	Escalante, Ackermann	3:39
4.	"In America" (originally performed by the Charlie Daniels Band)	Charlie Daniels, F. Edwards, J. Marshall, C. Hayward, T. Crain, T. Digregorio	2:37
5.	"Elvis Decanter"	Escalante, Robbie Allen	3:29
6.	"Goop All Over the Phone (Pleasant All Over the Bill)"	Escalante, Ackermann	3:15
7.	"Shi'ite Punk"	Dave Quackenbush, Ackermann	3:19
8.	"Gator Hide"	Escalante, Ackermann	4:10
9.	"Long Hair Queer"	Escalante, Quackenbush	2:27
10.	"(Illa Zilla) Lady Killa"	Escalante, Ackermann	5:23
Total length:			36:51

== Personnel ==
- Dave Quackenbush - vocals
- Jan Nils Ackermann - guitar, backing vocals
- Robbie Allen - bass, backing vocals, second guitar on "In America"
- Joe Escalante - drums, backing vocals, drum machine on "(Illa Zilla) Lady Killa"
- Pinky Dee - DJ

== Album information ==
- Record label: Restless Records, Sticky Fingers Records
- Recorded at The Music Grinder in Hollywood, California 1987–1988
- Produced by Thom Wilson
- Front cover photo by Alan Newberg
- Insert photo by Jose Pombo
- Background photography and layout by John Scarpatti
- Additional design and assembly by Rudy Tuesday
