= Brand New War =

American punk band

- Also known as: The God Awfuls
- Origin: Los Angeles U.S.
- Genres: Punk rock, street punk, anarcho-punk
- Years active: 2002-present
- Label: Kung-Fu Records
- Members: Kevin De Franco; Kyle Lumsden; Chris La Fave; John Skelley

Brand New War are an American punk rock band from Los Angeles, California, United States, who began their career as the God Awfuls. As the God Awfuls, their music was described as "pedestrian political punk rock" and compared to Anti-Flag, The Adicts, and Angelic Upstarts. Punk Planet opined that their music was well-crafted "but there are tons of bands like this, and The God Awfuls aren't particularly distinguishable from the rest".

== History ==
The song "Watch It Fall" from Next Stop Armageddon was featured on the 2005 skateboarding video game, Tony Hawk's American Wasteland. Maximum Rocknroll compared the Nex Stop Armageddon to Rancid and U.S. Bombs "without the ultra-scratchy vocals". Johnny Loftus of AllMusic acknowledged their "brazen" influence by "punk practitioners of the past in every pick slide, power chord, and strained vocal chord". However, Loftus was impressed by the way they reinvent their influences on "Disconnected Youth", "East Side One", and the subtle "N.R.A." He compared "Tonight" to the hard-drinking Social Distortion anthems; there's a couple of hits to "vintage hardcore", in particular "Sister", a version of "that simpering broken romance crap the more pop than punk establishment tries to sell the kids these days". Nevertheless, Ox-Fanzine felt that the band's attempt to imitate The Clash and Rancid failed, and there are more worthy representatives of the genre.

The God Awfuls appeared in the 2007 documentary Punk's Not Dead. In July 2008, the God Awfuls released three new songs on a demo. On October 28, 2008, the God Awfuls announced on their MySpace page they had changed their name to Brand New War.
