= The Show Must Go Off! =

Live concert DVD series

The Show Must Go Off! is a live concert DVD series produced by Kung Fu Films, an offshoot of the Kung Fu Records label, which began in 2002. The producer was Vandals bassist Joe Escalante. As of 2005, the series featured at least 19 "episodes". The series features punk rock and pop punk bands from various eras – from older groups that were popular in the 1980s and 1990s, to more recent acts.

The series title The Show Must Go Off! was first used for the recorded performance by Mest at the House of Blues, which was later re-labeled as "Episode 2" in the series, while the Vandals Christmas DVD released in 2002 became known as "Episode 1."

In later installments, numerous special features were incorporated into the DVD releases. Episode 9, The Vandals Live at the House of Blues was recorded using eight cameras, including a "Josh Freese cam" with a picture-in-picture close-up of the drummer's foot-pedal. The DVD also included optional subtitles for the lyrics, and commentary from band members.

== Episodes ==
Year	Episode	Artist	Title	Other information	Ref.
2002	1	The Vandals	Oi to the World! Live in Concert	Recorded at the Sun Theater in Anaheim, California December 2000.	
2003	2	Mest	Live at the House of Blues		
2003	3	One Man Army	Live at the Troubadour	Recorded at The Troubadour in West Hollywood, California, February 4, 2003.	
2003	4	Alkaline Trio	Halloween at the Metro	Recorded at The Metro in Chicago, Illinois, October 31, 2002.	
2003	5	Neil Hamburger	Live at the Phoenix Greyhound Park		
2003	6	Guttermouth	Live at the House of Blues	Includes bonus live concert CD.	
2003	7	Pistol Grip	Live at the Glasshouse	Recorded at the Glasshouse in Pomona, California.	
2003	8	Reel Big Fish	Live at the House of Blues	Recorded at the House of Blues June 20, 2003.	
2004	9	The Vandals	Live at the House of Blues	Recorded at the House of Blues in Anaheim, California, July 5, 2003. Includes bonus live concert CD. Numerous special features including "Josh Freese cam" with picture-in-picture close-up of foot pedal, optional on-screen lyrics, and commentary.	
2004	10	Adolescents	Live at the House of Blues	Includes bonus live concert CD	
2004	11	Goldfinger	Live at the House of Blues	Recorded at the House of Blues July 19, 2003.	
2004	12	Zebrahead	Live at the House of Blues	Recorded at the House of Blues in Anaheim, California, October 21, 2003.	
2004	13	Bleeding Through	This Is Live, This Is Murderous		
2004	14	The Matches	Live at the House of Blues	Recorded at the House of Blues in Anaheim, California, October 21, 2003.	
2004	15	Throw Rag	Live at the House of Blues	Recorded at the House of Blues in Anaheim, California, April 29, 2004.	
2005	16	Circle Jerks	Live at the House of Blues		
2005	17	Tsunami Bomb	Live at the Glasshouse	Recorded at the Glasshouse in Pomona, California, September 10, 2004.	
2005	18	Dance Hall Crashers	Live at House of Blues L.A.	Recorded at the House of Blues in Los Angeles, California, November 20, 2004.	
2005	19	The Bouncing Souls	Live at the Glasshouse		
