= Kung Fu Records =

American record label

- Founded: 1996; 30 years ago
- Founder: Joe Escalante; Warren Fitzgerald
- Genre: Punk rock
- Country of origin: U.S.
- Location: Seal Beach, California
- Official website: www.kungfurecords.com

Kung Fu Records is an American independent record label founded in 1996 by Joe Escalante and Warren Fitzgerald of the punk rock band The Vandals. Founded in order to release a record by the Riverside, California band Assorted Jelly Beans, the label soon grew to include a roster of notable artists such as The Ataris, Ozma, Tsunami Bomb, and The Vandals themselves. In 2000 Escalante started Kung Fu Films as a subsidiary of the music label in order to release DVDs of live concerts, music videos, band documentaries, and independent films. In 2005 Kung Fu also spawned the spinoff label Broken Sounds Records, focusing on hardcore releases.

== History ==
Kung Fu Records was founded by Vandals bassist Joe Escalante and guitarist Warren Fitzgerald in 1996. Escalante had been urged by his wife to allow the Riverside, California band Assorted Jelly Beans to open for The Vandals, and he and Fitzgerald were so impressed by their performance that they decided to start a record label in order to release the band's debut album.

In 2010, the label and the band Vandals were sued by Daily Variety stating it violated an agreement stemming from a complaint Variety registered in 2004 over the design of the Vandals’ “Hollywood Potato Chip” album cover, looking like the Variety logo. The label won the first round and the case was sent from Delaware to the California courts. The case was finally settled in 2012.

== Offshoots and subsidiary labels ==
Kung Fu records has also spawned several subsidiary imprints specializing in particular types of releases. In 2000 Escalante started Kung Fu Films as an offshoot of the label with the release of the independent film That Darn Punk, in which he starred. The label also released the internet television series Fear of a Punk Planet, which was later released on DVD. Over the years Kung Fu Films has released more independent films, such as 2005's Cake Boy starring Fitzgerald, and several video compilations showcasing bands from the Kung Fu labels. The film imprint is best known, however, for its series of live concert DVDs grouped under the title The Show Must Go Off! To date there have been 19 "episodes" of the series released. These have included bands signed to Kung Fu Records such as The Vandals and Tsunami Bomb, but more often have branched outside the label to include groups such as Alkaline Trio, Guttermouth, Reel Big Fish, the Circle Jerks, and The Bouncing Souls.

In 2005 Kung Fu Records launched the spinoff imprint Broken Sounds Records to focus on releases by hardcore acts such as the Righteous Jams, The Getaway, xdeathstarx, Suffocate Faster, and H2O. To date, however, the only album to be released under the Broken Sounds imprint has been the Righteous Jams' Rage of Discipline.

=== Artists ===
- Apocalypse Hoboken
- Assorted Jelly Beans
- The Ataris
- Audio Karate
- Bouncing Souls
- Down by Law
- Josh Freese
- The God Awfuls
- Kenneth Keith Kallenbach
- Knock-Out
- Longfellow
- One Man Army
- Ozma
- Sweet and Tender Hooligans
- Tsunami Bomb
- Underminded
- Useless ID
- The Vandals
- Versus the World

=== One-time releases ===
- Alkaline Trio
- blink-182
- MxPx
- Circle Jerks
- Guttermouth
- Throw Rag
- Reel Big Fish
- The Chinkees
- Bigwig

== Label compilations ==
Much like other independent record labels, Kung Fu has released a series of low-priced compilation samplers designed to draw attention to the label. Originally these compilations did not have a unifying title similar to Epitaph's Punk-O-Rama or Fat's Fat Music series. However the third sampler was titled Punk Rock is Your Friend, and this became the series' overall name. Future compilations were released as Punk Rock is Your Friend: Kung Fu Records Sampler #_, the first such release being #4 even though the first two did not carry the Punk Rock is Your Friend title.

=== CD samplers ===
Album Cover	Year	Title	Other information
	1999	No Stars, Just Talent	
	2000	The "Gone With the Wind" of Punk Rock Samplers	
	2002	Punk Rock is Your Friend	First in the series to carry the Punk Rock is Your Friend title.
	2003	Punk Rock is Your Friend: Kung Fu Records Sampler #4	
	2004	Punk Rock is Your Friend: Kung Fu Records Sampler #5	
	2005	Punk Rock is Your Friend: Kung Fu Records Sampler No. 6	Subtitled Hardcore is Your Friend, Too as it contains several tracks intended for the label's hardcore imprint Broken Sounds Records.

=== Video samplers ===
Cover	Year	Title	Format	Other information
	2002	Secret Weapons of Kung Fu	DVD	
	2004	Secret Weapons of Kung Fu 2	DVD	
	2005	Secret Weapons of Kung Fu 3	DVD	
