= Guttermouth discography =

- Studio albums: 10
- EPs: 6
- Live albums: 1
- Video albums: 2
- Music videos: 5
- Other appearances: 8

The discography of Guttermouth consists of nine studio albums, one live album, four EPs, two singles, two video albums, and five music videos.

== Studio albums ==
| Year | Album details | Peak chart positions | |
| Year | Album details | US | |
| Year | Album details | Independent | Heatseekers |
|---|---|---|---|
| 1991 | Full Length LP: Released: 1991; Label: Dr. Strange; Format: LP, CD | — | — |
| 1994 | Friendly People: Released: September 13, 1994; Label: Nitro; Format: LP, CD | — | — |
| 1996 | Teri Yakimoto: Released: May 7, 1996; Label: Nitro; Format: LP, CD | — | 33 |
| 1997 | Musical Monkey: Released: July 15, 1997; Label: Nitro; Format: LP, CD | — | 44 |
| 1999 | Gorgeous: Released: June 1, 1999; Label: Nitro; Format: LP, CD | — | — |
| 2001 | Covered with Ants: Released: April 10, 2001; Label: Epitaph; Format: CD | 31 | 49 |
| 2002 | Gusto: Released: August 13, 2002; Label: Epitaph; Format: CD | — | — |
| 2004 | Eat Your Face: Released: July 13, 2004; Label: Epitaph/Volcom; Format: CD | — | — |
| 2006 | Shave the Planet: Released: August 22, 2006; Label: Volcom; Format: CD | — | — |
"—" denotes releases that did not chart.

== Live albums ==
| Year | Album details |
|---|---|
| 1998 | Live from the Pharmacy: Released: July 28, 1998; Label: Nitro; Format: LP, CD |
| 2017 | The Whole Enchilada: Released: June 23, 2017; Label: Rude; Format: LP, CD |

== Extended plays ==
| Year | EP details |
|---|---|
| 1991 | Puke: Released: 1991; Label: Dr. Strange; Format: 7-inch EP |
| 1991 | Balls: Released: 1991; Label: Dr. Strange; Format: 7-inch EP |
| 1993 | 11oz.: Released: December 1, 1993; Label: Hopeless; Format: 7-inch EP |
| 2000 | The Chicken & Champagne EP: Released: August 29, 2000; Label: Shock; Format: CD |
| 2016 | Got It Made: Released: July 15, 2016; Label: Rude; Format: CD Digital Download, Cassette, Vinyl |
| 2016 | New Car Smell: Released: November 25, 2016; Label: Rude; Format: CD Digital Download, Cassette, Vinyl |

== Singles ==
| Year | Single details | Track |
|---|---|---|
| 1993 | Nonsense / Guttermouth: Released: 1993; Label: Custodial; Format: 7-inch | "Veggiecide" |
| 1993 | BHR / Guttermouth: Released: 1993; Label: Signal Sound Systems (SPR010); Format: 7-inch | "P.C." |

== Video albums ==
| Year | Album details |
|---|---|
| 2003 | Live at the House of Blues: Released: September 23, 2003; Label: Kung Fu; Format: DVD/CD |
| 2005 | Beyond Warped Live Music Series: Released: November 15, 2005; Label: Immergent; Format: DVD/CD |

== Music videos ==
| Year | Song | Director | Album |
|---|---|---|---|
| 1991 | "1, 2, 3…Slam!" | | Full Length LP |
| 1994 | "End on 9" | | Friendly People |
| 1995 | "Whiskey" | | Teri Yakimoto |
| 2001 | "She’s Got the Look" | | Covered with Ants |
| 2002 | "Scholarship in Punk" | | Gusto |

== Other appearances ==
The following Guttermouth songs were released on compilation albums, soundtracks, tribute albums, and as music downloads. This is not an exhaustive list; songs that were first released on the band's albums and EPs are not included.

| Year | Release details | Track |
|---|---|---|
| 1997 | Before You Were Punk: Released: March 11, 1997; Label: Vagrant; Format: CD | "Happy Loving Couples" (originally performed by Joe Jackson) |
| 1997 | Godmoney soundtrack: Released: August 12, 1997; Label: V2; Format: CD | "Cut Off" |
| 1999 | Short Music for Short People: Released: June 1, 1999; Label: Fat Wreck Chords; Format: CD | "Don Camaro Lost His Mind" |
| 2000 | Punk-O-Rama No. 5: Released: June 20, 2000; Label: Epitaph; Format: CD | "Secure Horizons" (demo) |
| 2000 | Punk Goes Metal: Released: August 1, 2000; Label: Fearless; Format: CD | "Sexual Abuse" (originally performed by St. Madness) |
| 2004 | The Only Constant Is Change: Released: July 13, 2004; Label: Volcom; Format: CD | "New Wave Hair Cut" |
| 2006 | Forever Free: A Sublime Tribute Album: Released: January 24, 2006; Label: Baseline Music; Format: CD | "April 29, 1992" (originally performed by Sublime) |
| 2006 | Released: 2006; Label: Nothingmedia.com; Format: download | "Rise Above" (originally performed by Black Flag) |
| 2017 | Punk Rock Halloween – Loud, Fast & Scary: Released: October 13, 2017; Label: Cleopatra Records; Format: CD, LP, Digital | "Ain't Life A Bitch" |
