= The Thought Remains the Same =

The Thought Remains The Same

Compilation album by Various Artists
- Released: 2000
- Genre: Punk rock
- Length: 50:22
- Label: Nitro Records
- Producer: Various

The Thought Remains The Same is a 2000 compilation album consisting of songs by bands on Nitro Records. The album was originally titled Deep Thoughts. Its title is a parody of the Led Zeppelin song "The Song Remains the Same".

== Track listing ==
Sources:

1. "Cafe 405" – The Vandals – 2:11
2. "A Single Second" – AFI – 2:12
3. "1, 2, 3... Slam" – Guttermouth – 1:45
4. "Superficial Love" – T.S.O.L. – 1:19
5. "Victims & Volunteers" – Jughead's Revenge – 3:11
6. "Floorlord" – One Hit Wonder – 2:43
7. "The Thing from Uranus" – Sloppy Seconds – 3:41
8. "D.U.I." – The Offspring – 2:26
9. "Self Pity" – AFI – 0:57
10. "Chicken Box" (Live) – Guttermouth – 1:30
11. "And Now We Dance" – The Vandals – 2:04
12. "Power Trip" – One Hit Wonder – 2:36
13. "Pain" – Jughead's Revenge – 2:22
14. "This Won't Hurt a Bit" – Guttermouth – 1:54
15. "If the Gov't Could Read My Mind" – The Vandals – 2:21
16. "Let's Kill the Trendy" – Sloppy Seconds – 2:21
17. "You Don't Have to Die" – T.S.O.L. – 3:23
18. "Love Is a Many Splendored Thing" – AFI – 1:31
19. "Lipstick" – Guttermouth – 2:53
20. "Tehran" – The Offspring – 3:07
21. "But Then She Spoke" – The Vandals – 1:56
22. "Perfect Fit" – AFI – 1:59

== Track origins ==
- "Cafe 405" and "If The Gov't Could Read My Mind" from Hitler Bad, Vandals Good
- "A Single Second" from Shut Your Mouth and Open Your Eyes
- "1, 2, 3... Slam" from Full Length LP
- "Superficial Love" from T.S.O.L.
- "Victims & Volunteers" from Just Joined
- "Floorlord" and "Powertrip" from Outfall
- "The Thing From Uranus" and "Let's Kill The Trendy" from More Trouble Than They're Worth
- "DUI" from Club Me
- "Self Pity" from Answer That and Stay Fashionable
- "Chicken Box" and "This Won't Hurt A Bit" from Live from the Pharmacy
- "And Now We Dance" from Live Fast, Diarrhea
- "Pain" from Image Is Everything
- "Love Is a Many Splendored Thing" from vinyl version of Very Proud of Ya
- "Lipstick" from Musical Monkey
- "Tehran" from The Offspring
- "But Then She Spoke" from The Quickening
- "Perfect Fit" from Very Proud of Ya
