= Just Joined =

1998 album by punk rock band Jughead's Revenge

Studio album by Jughead's Revenge
- Released: March 10, 1998
- Recorded: 1997
- Studio: Westbeach Recorders
- Genre: Punk rock Skate punk Hardcore punk Melodic hardcore
- Length: 30:29
- Label: Nitro Records
- Producer: Trever Keith

Jughead's Revenge chronology
Image Is Everything (1996)	Just Joined (1998)	Pearly Gates (1999)

Professional ratings
Review scores
Source	Rating
Allmusic	3/5 stars
SputnikMusic	3.6/5 stars

Just Joined is Jughead's Revenge's fifth studio album, released in 1998. This album marked the first time since 1992's It's Lonely at the Bottom that the band would record together as a five-piece, adding Craig Riker as their second guitarist. It was also their first and only album recorded with then-future Guttermouth drummer Ty Smith. The album was re-released in 2008 by Nitro Records via iTunes along with Image Is Everything and Pearly Gates.

== Track listing ==
No.	Title	Length
1.	"Hit and Run"	1:33
2.	"Sleepwaking"	2:00
3.	"Rules Don't Apply"	1:45
4.	"Victims and Volunteers"	3:11
5.	"Just Start Shooting"	2:09
6.	"Weight of the World"	3:37
7.	"Punk Isn't Cool Anymore"	2:40
8.	"Domino"	3:46
9.	"Community Leaders"	1:32
10.	"Surrender Your Secrets"	2:03
11.	"(Are You) Happy"	1:35
12.	"Casey"	2:16
13.	"Corporate Bashing"	1:25
14.	"Reprise"	0:58

== Personnel ==
- Joe Doherty − vocals
- Joey Rimicci − guitar
- Craig Riker - guitar
- Brian Preiss − bass
- Ty Smith - drums
