= Image Is Everything =

1996 album by Jughead's Revenge

Studio album by Jughead's Revenge
- Released: August 6, 1996
- Recorded: 1996 at Paramount Studios, Hollywood, California
- Genre: Punk rock Skate punk Hardcore punk Melodic hardcore
- Length: 32:00
- Label: Nitro Records
- Producer: Warren Fitzgerald

Jughead's Revenge chronology
13 Kiddie Favorites (1995)	Image Is Everything (1996)	Just Joined (1998)

Image is Everything
Review scores
Source	Rating
Sputnikmusic	3.9/5 stars

Image Is Everything is Jughead's Revenge's fourth studio album, released in 1996. It was the band's first release on the label Nitro Records (owned by The Offspring's Dexter Holland), who would release the rest of their albums before their indefinite hiatus in 2001. Nitro re-issued this album to iTunes in 2008, along with Just Joined and Pearly Gates.

== Tracks ==
No.	Title	Notes	Length
1	"Parliament of Whores		1:40
2	"Tearing Down the World		1:54
3	"Image Is Everything"		1:35
4	"Pain"		2:22
5	"Forever"		2:20
6	"For Once in My Life"		2:27
7	"The People's Pal"		2:21
8	"Environmental Scam"		1:23
9	"You're Only Dreaming"		1:58
10	"I Remember"	Remake of a 1992 song from It's Lonely at the Bottom, their second album	1:03
11	"Neuvocation"		1:34
12	"Hellvis"	Remake of "London Dungeon" by The Misfits	2:41
13	"Inside of You"	Re-recording of a 1995 song from their compilation album 13 Kiddie Favorites	2:06
14	One for the Bouncers"		2:26
15	"Skag up My Ass"	Instrumental	2:33
16	"Play With Fire"		1:27
+	"Rumble at Waikiki"	Bonus track on vinyl; a Jon and the Nightriders cover	

== Personnel ==
- Joe Doherty − vocals
- Joey Rimicci − guitar
- Brian Preiss − bass
- Jarrod Thornton − drums
