= Balls (EP) =

EP by Guttermouth
- Released: 1991
- Genre: Punk rock
- Length: ~6:16
- Label: Dr. Strange Records

Guttermouth chronology
Puke (1991)	Balls (1991)	Veggiecide (1993)

Balls is the second EP by the Huntington Beach, California punk rock band Guttermouth, released in 1991 by Dr. Strange Records. It is currently out of print, however all of the tracks were re-issued on the CD re-releases of the band's debut album Full Length LP in 1992 and 1996.

== Track listing ==
All songs written by Guttermouth
Side 1

1. "Under My Skin"

Side 2

1. "Gas Out"
2. "No Such Thing"

== Personnel ==
- Mark Adkins - vocals
- Scott Sheldon - guitar
- Eric "Derek" Davis - guitar
- Clint "Cliff" Weinrich - bass
- James Nunn - drums

== Album information ==
- Record label: Dr. Strange Records
- Recorded at Westbeach Recorders April 1991 by Donnell Cameron and Joe Peccorillo
