= 13 Kiddie Favorites =

Compilation album by Jughead's Revenge
- Released: September 5, 1995
- Recorded: 1995 at Paramount Studios, Hollywood, California
- Genre: Punk rock Skate punk Hardcore punk Melodic hardcore
- Label: BYO Records
- Producer: Barry Conley

Jughead's Revenge chronology
It's Lonely at the Bottom/Unstuck in Time (1995)	13 Kiddie Favorites (1995)	Image Is Everything (1996)

13 Kiddie Favorites is a compilation album by the punk rock band Jughead's Revenge, released in 1995. It is a collection of b-sides and never-before material. Although it is often referred to as the band's follow-up to Elimination, this appears to be factually incorrect.

== Track listing ==
No.	Title	Length
1.	"My Troubled Sleep"	2:10
2.	"No Apologies"	2:24
3.	"Runaway"	2:19
4.	"Afraid"	2:20
5.	"L.A. Girl" (Adolescents cover)	1:45
6.	"Inside of You"	2:15
7.	"49/61"	2:43
8.	"City of Hate"	2:41
9.	"Nothing Between Us"	2:39
10.	"The Loneliest Place"	1:50
11.	"Thursday" (Jim Croce cover)	2:17
12.	"Just Like You"	1:45
13.	"Divided" (live)	1:25

== Personnel ==
- Joe Doherty − vocals
- Joey Rimicci − guitar
- Brian Preiss − bass
- Jarrod Thornton − drums
