= Punkzilla =

Compilation album by Various artists
- Released: Oct 16, 2001
- Genre: Punk rock
- Label: Nitro
- Producer: Jimmy Dufour; Mark McKay; Sean Sweeney

Professional ratings
Review scores
Source	Rating
AllMusic	4/5 stars

Punkzilla is a 2001 compilation album consisting of songs by bands on Nitro Records.

== Track listing ==
No.	Title	Artist	Length
1.	"Dream of Waking" (vinyl-only track from The Art of Drowning)	AFI	3:04
2.	"Democracy?" (from Grave Disorder)	The Damned	3:15
3.	"Not The Same" (from How It Works)	Bodyjar	3:08
4.	"Behind The Music" (from Look What I Almost Stepped In...)	The Vandals	2:44
5.	"Still" (from Perhaps, I Suppose...)	Rufio	3:06
6.	"Jennifer Lost the War" (from The Offspring)	The Offspring	2:37
7.	"Wasted" (from Disappear)	T.S.O.L.	1:52
8.	"You Know How It Is" (from Speakeasy)	Stavesacre	2:18
9.	"Black Clouds vs. Silver Linings" (from The Price of Progression)	Ensign	2:19
10.	"Hit Machine" (from Gorgeous)	Guttermouth	2:01
11.	"Wester" (from The Art of Drowning)	AFI	3:03
12.	"Misunderstanding Maybe" (previously unreleased)	Divit	3:11
13.	"A Thousand Days" (from The Offspring)	The Offspring	2:12
14.	"Why Are You Alive?" (previously unreleased)	The Vandals	2:35
15.	"Lookin' For Action" (from Grave Disorder)	The Damned	4:06
16.	"Sold" (previously unreleased)	T.S.O.L.	2:01
17.	"Birds & Bees" (previously unreleased, later from Original Sinners)	Original Sinners	2:13
18.	"Michael" (from Songs from the Earth)	Son of Sam	3:16
19.	"Hypnotized" (from Fuel For Life)	The Turbo A.C.'s	2:35
20.	"The Days of the Phoenix" (from The Art of Drowning)	AFI	3:29
