= Cop out =

Cop out or cop-out may refer to:

== Film and television ==
- Cop Out (2010 film), a comedy film directed by Kevin Smith
- Cop-Out, a film by Lawrence L. Simeone, produced by Kimberley Casey
- Cop-Out, the US title for the 1967 UK film Stranger in the House
- "Cop-Out", a 1998 episode of Martial Law

== Music ==
- "Cop Out", a song on the 1969 film Naked Angels
- "Cop Out", a song by Peter Hope and Richard H. Kirk on the 1994 album Black Box – Wax Trax! Records: The First 13 Years
- Copout, a 1990s punk band made up of members who later went on to His Hero Is Gone
- "Cop Out", a song on the 2001 album Caught Off Guard by Much the Same
- "Cop Out", a song on the 2000 album Shorter, Faster, Louder by Kid Dynamite

== Other ==
- Cop-Out (play), a 1969 Broadway by John Guare
- Cop Out, a 1969 book by Ellery Queen
- Cop Out, a 1999 biography about the rugby 1981 Springbok Tour by Glenn Wood

== See also ==
- Cop (disambiguation)
- Out (disambiguation)
- Weasel word
