= It's Lonely at the Bottom/Unstuck in Time =

1995 compilation album by punk rock band Jughead's Revenge

Compilation album by Jughead's Revenge
- Released: April 16, 1995
- Recorded: May 1990 (tracks 17–28); June 1992 (tracks 1–16)
- Studio: Westbeach Recorders
- Genre: Punk rock Skate punk Hardcore punk Melodic hardcore
- Length: 1:01:56
- Label: BYO Records
- Producer: Tracks 1–16: Thee Slayer Hippie; Tracks 17–28: Brett Gurewitz

Jughead's Revenge chronology
Elimination (1994)	It's Lonely at the Bottom/Unstuck in Time (1995)	13 Kiddie Favorites (1995)

Professional ratings
Review scores
Source	Rating
Sputnikmusic	4.3/5 stars

It's Lonely at the Bottom/Unstuck in Time is a compilation album by the punk rock band Jughead's Revenge. It is a CD re-release of the band's first two albums, Unstuck in Time and It's Lonely at the Bottom, containing all of the tracks from both releases.

== Track listing ==
Tracks 1–16 are from It's Lonely at the Bottom; tracks 17–28 are from Unstuck in Time.

No.	Title	Length
1.	"Fabric of the Mind"	2:17
2.	"Burn"	2:05
3.	"Thorn of My Rose"	1:17
4.	"Angry"	1:37
5.	"I Remember"	1:02
6.	"People Bomb"	1:38
7.	"Stabbed in the Back"	1:29
8.	"Whom Gods Destroy"	1:22
9.	"Love Me Tender" (Elvis Presley cover)	2:20
10.	"The Real World"	1:35
11.	"Deny Myself"	2:10
12.	"When the Party's Over"	1:52
13.	"Alone"	4:07
14.	"Flower Child"	2:06
15.	"Divided"	1:28
16.	"The Last, Last Laugh"	2:20
17.	"Jughead's Revenge"	1:58
18.	"Unstuck in Time"	1:35
19.	"Failure at Life"	3:10
20.	"State of the World"	2:14
21.	"Fuck Shit Up"	1:45
22.	"Formula"	1:00
23.	"Pack Your Bags"	1:42
24.	"Memories of You"	2:58
25.	"My Problems"	1:13
26.	"Face of Destruction"	2:37
27.	"Not My House"	1:46
28.	"Sentenced to Die"	2:49

== Personnel ==
- Joe Doherty – vocals
- Joey Rimicci − guitar
- George Snow − guitar
- Brian Preiss − bass
- Nenus Givargus − drums
