= Unstuck in Time =

Studio album by Jughead's Revenge
- Released: 1990
- Recorded: May 1990 at Westbeach Recorders, Hollywood, California
- Genre: Punk rock Skate punk Hardcore punk Melodic hardcore
- Label: Lawsuit Records
- Producer: Brett Gurewitz

Jughead's Revenge chronology
Unstuck in Time (1990)	It's Lonely at the Bottom (1992)

Unstuck in Time is Jughead's Revenge's first studio album, released in 1990. It was re-released by BYO Records in 1995 as the second half of the CD that also included the band's second album, It's Lonely at the Bottom. It is titled It's Lonely at the Bottom/Unstuck in Time.

== Track listing ==
1. "Jughead's Revenge"
2. "Unstuck in Time"
3. "Failure at Life"
4. "State of the World"
5. "Fuck Shit Up"
6. "Formula 502"
7. "Pack Your Bags"
8. "Memories Of You"
9. "My Problems"
10. "Face of Destruction"
11. "Not My House"
12. "Sentenced to Die"

== Personnel ==
- Joe Doherty − vocals
- Joey Rimicci − guitar
- George Snow − guitar
- Brian Preiss − bass
- Nenus Givargus − drums
