= Chris McGrath =

Chris McGrath may refer to:

- Chris McGrath (footballer) (Christopher Roland McGrath, born 1954), Northern Irish footballer
- Christian McGrath (born 1972), American fantasy and science fiction illustrator
- Christopher C. McGrath (1902–1986), US Congressman from New York
- Gunner McGrath (Christopher Leslie McGrath, born 1978), American musician, lead singer and guitarist of the punk rock band Much The Same
