= Survive (Much the Same album) =

Studio album by Much the Same
- Released: US: August 29, 2006; JP: January 10, 2007
- Recorded: February–March 2006
- Genre: Punk rock, pop punk, melodic hardcore
- Length: 32:18
- Label: Nitro Records
- Producer: Cameron Webb

Much the Same chronology
Quitters Never Win (2003)	Survive (2006)	Everything Is Fine (2019)

Professional ratings
Review scores
Source	Rating
Allmusic	4/5 stars
Alternative Press	4/5 stars
Punknews.org	4/5 stars

Survive is the second full-length studio album by Much the Same. It was released on August 29, 2006, by Nitro Records and is the last album by the band before their breakup in 2007, before reuniting in 2015.

== Track listing ==
1. "The Greatest Betrayal" – 2:36
2. "American Idle" – 3:13
3. "Gut Shot" – 3:16
4. "What I Know" – 3:11
5. "Take What's Yours" – 2:34
6. "Skeletons" – 3:38
7. "For Those Left Behind" – 3:14
8. "Living a Lie" – 1:09
9. "Stitches" – 3:50
10. "Wrecking Ball" – 2:41
11. "Picking Up the Shattered Pieces" – 2:56
12. "Seasons Change" (feat. Nick Diener of The Swellers) Japanese bonus track

== Personnel ==
- Gunner McGrath – Lead Vocals, Guitar, Piano
- Franky Tsoukalas – Bass, Vocals
- Dan O'Gorman – Guitar
- Jevin Kaye – Drums
- Cameron Webb – Producer, Engineer, Mixing
- Zoli Teglas – Additional Vocals
- Andy Lareau – Vocals, Additional Engineering, Guitar
- Mark Michalik – Additional Engineering
- Jared Rohde – Vocals
- Ed Perry – Gang Vocals
- Joey Ciola – Gang Vocals

== Japanese edition ==
This album was released on January 10, 2007, on Radtone Music in Japan. This edition contains a bonus track entitled "Seasons Change", which features Nick Diener of The Swellers adding additional vocals and guitar.
