= BHR / Guttermouth =

P.C.

EP (split) by Guttermouth and BHR
- Released: 1993
- Genre: Punk rock
- Label: Signal Sound System Records

Guttermouth chronology
Veggiecide (1993)	P.C. (1993)	11oz. (1993)

P.C. is a split 7-inch vinyl single by Guttermouth and BHR, released in 1993 by Signal Sound System Records. It is currently out of print. P.C. is both the title of Guttermouth's side of the record and their track. The song was re-recorded for their 1994 album Friendly People.

== Track listing ==
Guttermouth

1. "P.C." (Guttermouth)

BHR

1. "Transylvania Slam"
2. "Rabies"

== Personnel ==
=== Guttermouth ===
- Mark Adkins - vocals
- Scott Sheldon - guitar
- Eric "Derek" Davis - guitar
- Clint "Cliff" Weinrich - bass
- James Nunn - drums

== Album information ==
- Record label: Signal Sound System Records
