= Live at the House of Blues (Guttermouth album) =

Live album (with DVD) by Guttermouth
- Released: October 7, 2003
- Genre: Punk rock
- Length: ~1:03:01
- Label: Epitaph

Guttermouth chronology
Gusto (2002)	Live at the House of Blues (2003)	Eat Your Face (2004)

Live at the House of Blues is a live DVD and CD by the Huntington Beach, California punk rock band Guttermouth, released in 2003 by Kung Fu Records. It was released in 2 packages, one a DVD with a bonus concert CD, the other a CD with a bonus DVD. Both packages contain the same discs and material, merely packaged differently so that it could be stacked on both CD and DVD shelves. Although it is the band's second live album, it was intended as a video release and is therefore usually not included in their overall count of albums.

For this performance and some other touring the band was joined by original bass player Clint Weinrich, who would officially rejoin the band in 2006. During the closing number of "Perfect World" the audience was stirred into such a frenzy that parts of the filming equipment were damaged and the footage could not be used on the DVD, although the audio portion was preserved on the CD.

== Track listing ==
All songs written by Guttermouth

1. "Asshole"
2. "End on 9"
3. "Derek"
4. "That's Life"
5. "Can I Borrow Some Ambition?"
6. "Secure Horizons"
7. "Lucky the Donkey"
8. "Do the Hustle"
9. "She's Got the Look"
10. "Lipstick"
11. "Chug-a-Lug Night"
12. "Looking Out for #1"
13. "Just a Fuck"
14. "Chicken Box"
15. "Mr. Barbeque"
16. "Marco-Polo"
17. "Marco-Polo" (again)
18. "Race Track"
19. "Bruce Lee vs. the KISS Army"
20. "1, 2, 3...Slam!"
21. "Perfect World"*

*Due to damage to the video recording equipment, "Perfect World" appears only on the CD portion of the release.

== Personnel ==
- Mark Adkins - vocals
- Scott Sheldon - guitar
- Eric "Derek" Davis - guitar
- Clint Weinrich - bass guitar
- Tyrone "Ty" Smith – drums
