= Full Length LP =

Studio album by Guttermouth
- Released: LP: 1991; CD: 1992 re-release: 1996
- Recorded: April 27–28 & June 22–23, 1990
- Genre: Punk rock
- Length: original LP: ~26:17 original CD: ~39:09; 1996 re-release: ~39:50
- Label: Dr. Strange, Nitro
- Producer: Guttermouth

Guttermouth chronology
| Full Length LP (1991) | Friendly People (1994) |

Alternative covers
- 1992 CD cover showing the original LP being burned

Alternative cover
- Cover of the 1996 re-release titled The Album Formerly Known as Full Length LP

Professional ratings
Review scores
| Source | Rating |
|---|---|
| Allmusic | link |

Full Length LP is the debut album by the Huntington Beach, California punk rock band Guttermouth, released in 1991 by Dr. Strange Records. It introduced the band's style of fast, abrasive punk rock with tongue-in-cheek humor and sarcastic lyrics. The album was originally released as an LP but was repackaged the following year as a CD including tracks from the band's first 2 EPs Puke and Balls, as well as the previously unreleased tracks "Malted Vomit" and "Ghost." It was re-released again in 1996 by Nitro Records under the title The Album Formerly Known as Full Length LP.

The album proved to be a success for the band, expanding their fan base and giving them opportunities to play shows all over southern California alongside other popular punk rock bands. An animated music video was made for the song “1, 2, 3…Slam!” and played on local punk rock and skateboarding video programs. Many of the songs from Full Length would remain staples in the band's live set throughout their career.

== Track listing ==
All songs written by Guttermouth except where noted

1. "Race Track"
2. "No More"
3. "Jack La Lanne"
4. "Where Was I?"
5. "Old Glory"
6. "I'm Punk"
7. "Mr. Barbeque"
8. "Bruce Lee vs. the Kiss Army"
9. "Chicken Box"
10. "Carp"
11. "Toilet"
12. "Oats"
13. "1, 2, 3...Slam!"
14. "I Used to be 20" (written & originally performed by the Dayglo Abortions as "I Used to be in Love")
15. "Reggae Man"
16. "Chicken Box" (again)*
17. "Just a Fuck"*
18. "Hypocrite"*
19. "Marco-Polo"*
20. "Under My Skin"*
21. "Gas Out"*
22. "No Such Thing"*
23. "Malted Vomit"*
24. "Ghost"*

*Tracks 16–24 are included on CD re-releases only. Tracks 16–22 comprise the band's first 2 EPs Puke and Balls, while tracks 23 & 24 are previously unreleased. "Chicken Box (again)" is not included on the 1996 re-release.

== Personnel ==
- Mark Adkins - vocals
- Scott Sheldon - guitar
- Eric "Derek" Davis - guitar
- Clint "Cliff" Weinrich - bass
- James Nunn - drums

== Album information ==
- Record label:
  - original LP & CD releases: Dr. Strange Records
  - 1996 re-release: Nitro Records
- Recorded April 27–28 and June 22–23, 1990 at Westbeach Recorders by Donnell Cameron with assistance by Joe Peccorillo
- Produced by Guttermouth
- All songs written by Guttermouth except "I Used to be 20" by the Dayglow Abortions
- 1996 re-release remastered by Eddie Shreyer at Futuredisc
- Photos on 1996 re-release by Paul Cobb
