= Eat Your Face =

Studio album by Guttermouth
- Released: July 13, 2004
- Recorded: April 5–10, 2004
- Genre: Punk rock
- Length: 40:02
- Label: Epitaph, Volcom Entertainment
- Producer: Scott Sheldon, Donald Horne

Guttermouth chronology
Live at the House of Blues (2003)	Eat Your Face (2004)	Shave the Planet (2006)

Professional ratings
Review scores
Source	Rating
Allmusic	3.5/5 stars

Eat Your Face is the eighth album by the Huntington Beach, California punk rock band Guttermouth, released in 2004 by Epitaph Records and Volcom Entertainment. It was hailed as a "return to form" after the stylistic experimentations of 2002's Gusto, going back to the band's tried-and-true style of fast, abrasive punk rock with tongue-in-cheek humor and sarcastic lyrics. The album marked a period of transition for the band, whose founding guitarist Eric Davis had left the group early in 2004 and been replaced by Donald Horne. It was also their only album with bassist Kevin Clark, and their last with longtime drummer Ty Smith. Lyrically it retained the band's sense of biting sarcasm and expressed dissatisfaction with the U.S. electoral system and the current state of punk rock in the mainstream, amongst other topics.

In the summer of 2004 Guttermouth embarked on the Vans Warped Tour in support of Eat Your Face. However, the band's outrageous behavior and propensity for stirring up controversy soon led to problems on the tour. Singer Mark Adkins would often openly insult other acts from onstage, and the band members mocked the anti-Republican agenda of many of the tour's performers by selling T-shirts and displaying banners that proclaimed support for President George W. Bush. After several weeks the band abruptly left the tour, causing many rumors to circulate online and in the music press as to the reasons behind their departure, some claiming that they had been ejected and others that they had been asked to leave. Eventually Adkins issued a statement admitting that the band had left the tour voluntarily, due in part to his distaste for the political atmosphere surrounding it.

Eat Your Face was released jointly by Epitaph Records and Volcom Entertainment. It would be the band's final recording for Epitaph, as they would move fully to Volcom for their next album, 2006's Shave the Planet.

== Track listing ==
All songs written by Guttermouth

1. "Party of Two (Your Table is Ready)" - 2:53
2. "Surf's Up Asshole" - 3:15
3. "Octopus Hairpiece" - 2:19
4. "Wasted Lives" - 2:10
5. "The Next Faux Mohican" - 2:42
6. "Season" - 1:58
7. "Second DUI" - 2:31
8. "My Neighbor's Baby" - 2:54
9. "Guadalahabra (The La Habra Spirit)" - 2:33
10. "NRAA" - 1:59
11. "I Read it on a Bathroom Wall in Reno" - 1:52
12. "Ticket to Quebec" - 1:11
13. "Hot Dog to the Head (A Hot Dog is a Food Not a Penis So Get it Right or Pay the Price)" - 11:45

== Performers ==
- Mark Adkins - vocals
- Scott Sheldon - guitar
- Donald "Don" Horne - guitar
- Kevin Clark - bass guitar
- William Tyler "Ty" Smith - drums

== Album information ==
- Record label: Epitaph Records
- Recorded at Criterion Studios and Harcourt Studios April 5–10, 2004
- Produced by Scott Sheldon and Donald Horne
- Engineered by Brent
- Engineered by Brent, Scott Sheldon, and Donald Horne
- Mastered by Gene Grimaldi at Oasis Mastering
