= Pearly Gates (album) =

Studio album by Jughead's Revenge
- Released: October 19, 1999
- Recorded: 1999 at For the Record, Orange, California
- Genre: Punk rock Skate punk Hardcore punk Melodic hardcore
- Label: Nitro Records

Jughead's Revenge chronology
Just Joined (1998)	Pearly Gates (1999)

Professional ratings
Review scores
Source	Rating
Punknews.org	2/5 stars

Pearly Gates is a studio album by Jughead's Revenge, released in 1999. A lawsuit filed by Archie Comics forced the band to change their name to Jugg's Revenge; the band went on indefinite hiatus in 2001.

== Critical reception ==
Exclaim! wrote that the album "proves exactly why this quartet is hailed one of the originators of the SoCal pop-punk sound that has been appropriated by so many other bands." Skiing deemed it "California hardcore as bright and perfect as the halfpipe dreams ricocheting between the ears of untold thousands of high schoolers."

== Track listing ==
1. "These Valley Streets" (2:45)
2. "Lolita" (1:38)
3. "Faust Part 2" (1:10)
4. "No Time" (4:01)
5. "Rising, Rising" (1:33)
6. "Perfect" (2:02)
7. "Swell" (2:15)
8. "Make a Wish" (2:22)
9. "Kill Security" (0:55)
10. "You Never Know" (2:30)
11. "Reprise" (1:35)
12. "Rent a Cop Blues" (1:17)
13. "Anthem" (2:20)
14. "Just What I Needed (The Cars cover)" (3:36)

== Personnel ==
- Joe Doherty − vocals
- Joey Rimicci − guitar
- Brian Preiss − bass
- Andy Alvarez − drums
