= Gorgeous (Guttermouth album) =

Studio album by Guttermouth
- Released: June 1, 1999
- Genre: Hardcore punk, punk rock
- Length: 31:52
- Label: Nitro

Guttermouth chronology
| Live from the Pharmacy (1998) | Gorgeous (1999) | Covered with Ants (2001) |

Professional ratings
Review scores
| Source | Rating |
|---|---|
| Allmusic | link |

Gorgeous is the fifth album by the Huntington Beach, California punk rock band Guttermouth, released in 1999 by Nitro Records. It was the band's most aggressive album to date, due in part to a lineup change: bass player Steve Rapp had left the group and drummer James Nunn had taken over his position, making room for new drummer Ty Smith (credited here as T. Bradford). It would also be the band's last album for Nitro, as they moved to Epitaph Records the following year.

== Track listing ==
All songs written by Guttermouth

1. "Hit Machine" – 1:58
2. "Encyclopedia Brown – 1:34
3. "Con Especial – 1:51
4. "Viva America" – 1:11
5. "Diamond Studded Bumble Bee" – 1:33
6. "A Date with Destiny" – 2:19
7. "The Dreaded Sea Lice Have Come Aboard" – 1:34
8. "A Nice Place to Visit" – 1:59
9. "Food Storage" – 2:39
10. "I Have a Dream" – 2:10
11. "BBB" – 1:39
12. "High Balls" – 4:25
13. "Power Up" (introduction) – 4:02
14. "Power Up" – 2:51

== Personnel ==
- Mark Adkins - vocals
- Scott Sheldon - guitars
- Eric "Derek" Davis - guitars
- "Admiral" James Nunn - bass
- T. Bradford (William Tyler "Ty" Smith) - drums

== Album information ==
- Record label: Nitro Records
- Produced by Guttermouth
- Recorded and mixed at Paramount Studios
- Engineered by Donnell Cameron and Jim Goodwin
- Mixed by Donnell Cameron
- Mastered by Eddie Schrayer at Oasis Mastering
- Art by Steve Rapp
- Cover photo by Monique Pritchard
