= Covered with Ants =

Studio album by Guttermouth
- Released: April 10, 2001
- Studio: Paramount Studios; Harcourt Studios, Inglewood, CA
- Genre: Punk rock
- Length: 31:34
- Label: Epitaph

Guttermouth chronology
Gorgeous (1999)	Covered with Ants (2001)	Gusto (2002)

Professional ratings
Review scores
Source	Rating
Allmusic	4.5/5 stars

Covered with Ants is the sixth album by the Huntington Beach, California punk rock band Guttermouth, released in 2001 by Epitaph Records. It was the band's first album for Epitaph, having ended their contract with Nitro Records the previous year. The album continued the band's style of fast, abrasive punk rock with tongue-in-cheek humor and sarcastic lyrics, but found them experimenting with instruments they had not used before such as organ, banjo, and fiddle. A music video was filmed for the song "She's Got the Look”. Covered With Ants would be the band's last recording with founding member James Nunn, and after his departure their music would take a different direction on 2002's Gusto.

== Track listing ==
All songs written by Guttermouth

1. "That's Life" – 3:01
2. "Can I Borrow Some Ambition?" – 2:18
3. "Secure Horizons" – 2:50
4. "She's Got the Look" – 2:41
5. "Looking Good is All That Matters" – 2:11
6. "I'm Destroying the World" – 1:59
7. "Chug-a-Lug Night" – 3:38
8. "What You Like About Me" – 3:04
9. "I Won't See You in the Pit" – 1:09
10. "Black Enforcers" – 2:11
11. "Cram it Up Your Ass" – 6:36

== In popular culture ==
A clean version of "I'm Destroying the World" was featured in the soundtrack for Tony Hawk's Pro Skater 3.

== Personnel ==
- Mark Adkins - vocals
- Scott Sheldon - guitars
- Eric "Derek" Davis - guitars
- James "The Captain" Nunn - bass
- William Tyler "Ty" Smith - drums
- Chris Colonnier - organ on "Cram it Up Your Ass"
- Brantley Kearns - fiddle
- Sascha Lazor (Mad Caddies) - banjo

Production

- Jim Goodwin - recording, production
- Scott Sheldon - production
- Eric Davis - production
- Eddie Schreyer - mastering
- Steve Rapp - art, layout design
