= Dead Rhythm Machine =

Studio album by The Letters Organize
- Released: Early 2005
- Recorded: 2004–2005
- Genre: Post-hardcore
- Length: 31:21
- Label: Nitro Records
- Producer: Andrew Alekel and Mitchell Townsend

Professional ratings
Review scores
Source	Rating
AllMusic	3.5/5 stars
Alternative Press	5/5 stars
Drowned in Sound	9/10
Punknews.org	3.5/5 stars

Dead Rhythm Machine is an album by American band The Letters Organize, released in 2005.

== Critical reception ==
AllMusic wrote: "Complete with urgent, angular riffs, pummeling drumwork, and a relentless, machine-like approach, this Atlanta-based band scorches through a baker's dozen songs that are sure to please fans of abrasive, intense punk." Drowned in Sound called the album "a fast-and-furious 31 minute lesson in quick-shot rock ‘n’ roll punk; a genuine fire-cracker of a record." Alternative Press called it "a certified screamo-garage masterpiece".

== Track listing ==
1. "Dressed Up in Gatwick"
2. "Matador"
3. "These Words"
4. "I Want I Want"
5. "They Call It Rock N Roll (And Other Lies)"
6. "Trouble Sleeping"
7. "There's Room for One More"
8. "Don't Move"
9. "Perfection?"
10. "Costume in the Corner"
11. "A Song of Hope"
12. "A Book for Dummies"
13. "Operation Dead"
