= 11oz. =

EP by Guttermouth
- Released: 1993
- Recorded: Nov. 10–11, 1993
- Genre: Punk rock
- Label: Hopeless

Guttermouth chronology
P.C. (1993)	11oz. (1993)	The Chicken & Champagne EP (2000)

11oz. is an EP by the Huntington Beach, California punk rock band Guttermouth, released in 1993 by Hopeless Records. It was the first release put out by the label and is currently out of print. The song "Just a Fucking Lounge Version" is a lounge-singer-esque recreation of their song "Just A Fuck" from the band's debut 7" Puke, while "Sid Vicious Was Innocent" is a song originally performed by the Exploited, with altered lyrics written by Guttermouth. The EP's title and artwork are based on 11oz. bottles of Lucky Lager, which bore cryptograms inside their bottlecaps. The cryptogram on the cover equates to "fingerbang Guttermouth piece of shit."

== Track listing ==
All songs written by Guttermouth except where noted
Side A

1. "Hopeless"
2. "Just a Fucking Lounge Version"

Side B

1. "Pot"
2. "Sid Vicious Was Innocent' (written & originally performed by The Exploited)

== Performers ==
- Mark Adkins – Vocals
- Scott Sheldon – guitar
- Eric "Derek" Davis – guitar
- Clint "Cliff" Weinrich – bass
- James Nunn – drums

== Album information ==
- Record label: Hopeless Records
- Recorded and mixed at Westbeach Recorders November 10–11, 1993 by Donnell Cameron with assistance by Joe Peccerillo
- Mastered by John Golden at K Disc
- Artwork by Neil Skowronek and Jake Smirnoff
- All songs written by Guttermouth except "Sid Vicious Was Innocent" by the Exploited with altered lyrics by Guttermouth
