= Puke (EP) =

EP by Guttermouth
- Released: 1991
- Genre: Punk rock
- Length: ~6:35
- Label: Dr. Strange Records

Guttermouth chronology
Puke (1991)	Balls (1991)

Puke is the debut EP by the Huntington Beach, California punk rock band Guttermouth, released in 1991 by Dr. Strange Records. It is currently out of print, however all of the tracks were re-issued on the CD re-release of the band's debut album Full Length LP a year later.

== Track listing ==
All songs written by Guttermouth
Side 1

1. "Chicken Box"
2. "Just a Fuck"

Side 2

1. "Hypocrite"
2. "Marco-Polo"

== Performers ==
- Mark Adkins – vocals
- Scott Sheldon – guitar
- Eric "Derek" Davis – guitar
- Clint "Cliff" Weinrich – bass
- James Nunn – drums

== Album information ==
- Record label: Dr. Strange Records
