= Punk Sucks =

Punk Sucks is a California punk rock compilation album, released by Southern California-based Liberation Records in 1995.

== Track listing ==
1. Pennywise - "Slowdown"
2. No Use for a Name - "Soulmate"
3. Ten Foot Pole - "Racer X"
4. Sublime - "All You Need"
5. Home Grown - "Face in the Crowd"
6. Voodoo Glow Skulls - "Descendent's Song"
7. White Kaps - "Germs"
8. 88 Fingers Louie - "Too Many"
9. Neighbors - "Sometimes"
10. H.F.L. - "Old School Pride"
11. Everready - "I Hate You"
12. Bollweevils - "New Dreams"
13. Unwritten Law - "C.P.K."
14. Good Riddance - "Mother Superior"
15. Blink-182 - "M+M's"
16. Strung Out - "Support Your Troops"
17. Naked Aggression - "Right Now"
18. Jughead's Revenge - "49/61"
19. Funeral Oration - "Damn You"
20. Overlap - "Song #9"
21. The Bouncing Souls - "The Ballad Of Johnny X"
22. Boris the Sprinkler - "All My Time"
23. Glue Gun - "Skate The Haight"
24. Quincy Punx - "Cereal Killer"
25. Fed Up! - "Can't Figure It"
26. Straight Faced - "Omit"
27. F.Y.P - "2000 A.D."
28. Fighting Cause - "Bummers"
29. Supernovice - "Out On The Grass"
30. The Living End - "Deadbeat"
