= Musical Monkey =

Studio album by Guttermouth
- Released: July 15, 1997
- Recorded: 1997
- Genre: Skate punk
- Length: 28:16
- Label: Nitro
- Producer: Donnell Cameron, Guttermouth

Guttermouth chronology
Teri Yakimoto (1996)	Musical Monkey (1997)	Live from the Pharmacy (1998)

Professional ratings
Review scores
Source	Rating
AllMusic	3/5 stars
Los Angeles Times	2.5/4 stars

Musical Monkey is the fourth album by the Huntington Beach, California, punk rock band Guttermouth, released in 1997 by Nitro Records.

The album peaked at No. 44 on Billboard's Heatseekers Albums chart.

== Critical reception ==
The Los Angeles Times determined that Guttermouth's "ridicule of gays, animal-rights zealots, punk rock factionalists and sundry other targets is so over-the-top and scattershot that it obviously is just a prank against social rectitude, an emission not of seething malice but of junior-high-level perversity ... This approach robs Guttermouth of any real satiric bite (which would require moral outrage to buttress the foolery), but the band's raunchy humor in the service of knuckleheadedness does bring some guilty titters." The Illawarra Mercury opined that the band "are masters of the somewhat difficult art of combining social commentary with outrageous satire, and putting it to music that's hard, fast and strangely melodic for punk."

AllMusic wrote: "From Orange County comes a band that reflects all the worst aspects of the Orange County punk scene." OC Weekly deemed the album one of the band's "seminal OC punk records," writing that it "watermark[s] the time and place as well as anything put out during that era." Cincinnati CityBeat called "Lipstick" "a vindictive, twisted song—and also weirdly compelling and memorable."

== Track listing ==
All songs written by Guttermouth

No.	Title	Length
1.	"What's the Big Deal?"	1:55
2.	"Lucky the Donkey"	1:43
3.	"Big Pink Dress"	1:23
4.	"Do the Hustle"	2:23
5.	"Good Friday"	1:09
6.	"Baker's Dozen"	2:09
7.	"Abort Mission"	2:11
8.	"Corpse Rotting in Hell"	1:26
9.	"Lipstick"	2:52
10.	"When Hell Freezes Over"	1:19
11.	"S.D.F.B" (Suckin' Dick for Beer)	1:45
12.	"What If?"	2:25
13.	"Perfect World"	1:53
14.	"Gold"	1:36
15.	"Musical Monkey"	2:00
Total length:		28:16

== Performers ==
- Mark Adkins - vocals
- Scott Sheldon - guitars
- Eric "Derek" Davis - guitars
- Steve "Stever" Rapp - bass
- James Nunn (aka Captain James T. Nunn) - drums

== Album information ==
- Record label: Nitro Records
- Recorded at Westbeach Recorders by Donnell Cameron
- Mixed at Wesbteach Recorders by Donnell Cameron and Guttermouth
- Mastered by Eddie Schrayer at Oasis Mastering
