= Adam the Woo =

American YouTube travel vlogger (1974–2025)

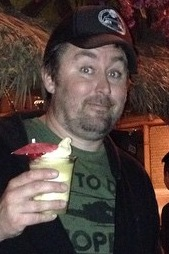
- Williams at Disneyland in 2016
- Born: David Adam Williams; August 10, 1974; Tupelo, Mississippi, U.S.
- Died: December 22, 2025 (aged 51); Celebration, Florida, U.S.
- Other name: Adam Williams

Instagram information
- Page: adamthewooATW

YouTube information
- Channels: adamthewoo; TheDailyWoo
- Years active: 2006–2025
- Genre: Travel
- Subscribers: 1.2 million
- Views: 425.1 million
- Last updated: August 24, 2026

David Adam Williams (August 10, 1974 – December 22, 2025), known by his online name Adam the Woo, was an American vlogger and musician. One of the earliest content creators to focus on travel and urban exploration-style content on YouTube, he specialized in amusement parks, filming locations, and abandoned attractions.

== Early life ==
David Adam Williams was born in Tupelo, Mississippi, to June, a retired school bus driver, and Jim, a Protestant youth minister. He grew up going to church every Sunday, and attended Bible classes twice a week. As a result of Jim Williams' ministry work, the family moved often, with Williams having to find ways to entertain himself on his own.

Jim Williams stated that the family would borrow a video camera from members of the church congregation and Adam would record video segments with his sister. The family did not own a television set until 1985, when Williams was 11. In order to watch movies, the family would rent a VCR for the weekend. Williams was homeschooled from the 8th through the 11th grade, when he took his GED test. After moving thirteen times throughout the American Midwest and South, in 1991 the family finally settled down in St. Cloud, Florida.

== Career ==
Williams started his eponymous "adamthewoo" YouTube channel in 2006, making him an early adopter of the vlogging platform. By 2008, he progressed to producing travel segments while living out of his van, covering roadside attractions while playing bass guitar on tour with American punk rock band Guttermouth.

Now referring to himself as "an 80s pop culture nerd with a desire to travel and video what I see", Williams started a second YouTube channel called "TheDailyWoo" in July 2012. It attracted higher viewership than his original channel, and Williams began what would become a five‑year streak of recording and uploading daily vlogs. His subject matter revolved around abandoned haunts, points of interest, roadside attractions, former movie filming locations, and theme parks (especially Disney Parks and Resorts) across the fifty U.S. states. Some of the movie locations he covered were for cult films that flopped at the box office, but which still had fans interested in trivial details of how the films were made. He attempted to attend a baseball game by the Tampa Bay Rays—his favorite team—at every stadium where they played. Williams ended the streak in September 2017, when he shifted to recording videos on an almost daily basis, still focused on his travels to amusement parks in the United States, Europe and other international locations, including the Korean Demilitarized Zone. His method in creating these videos has been described as having a "calm" and conversational approach, typically filmed in a first-person, walk and talk style, always introducing his vlogs with the catchphrase, "Join me, shall you?" He eventually produced 4,000 videos and garnered over a million subscribers on his YouTube channels. By February 2022, Williams had amassed almost 300 million views on his channels.

== Controversies ==
Williams was stopped at the gate of Disney's Hollywood Studios in January 2013, having been banned from Walt Disney World after management became aware of videos he made backstage at the park. The ban was lifted in 2015, and Williams resumed occasional visits to the park, though he subsequently refrained from entering restricted areas. Universal Orlando banned Williams in 2017 for recording inside two abandoned buildings on its property; the ban remained in effect until his death in 2025.

In 2025, Williams alleged that Netflix used clips from his 2019 video covering the viral Storm Area 51 event in their documentary Trainwreck: Storm Area 51 without his permission. The company did not respond to the allegations directly, but reportedly had the claim under review. The incident prompted discussion regarding the fair use of social-media influencers' content in traditional media company documentaries.

== Personal life and death ==
After living out of his van for three years, Williams moved into an apartment with a roommate in Orange County, California, in 2015. He relocated to Celebration, Florida, in 2021 and purchased a home there two years later. Williams frequently traveled with his parents and sister, Faith Murray, who appeared in his vlogs.

After returning to Celebration for the 2025 Christmas season following a European trip that included Disneyland Paris, Williams uploaded his final video featuring holiday decorations in his hometown. He was last seen alive by a friend on December 21, 2025. After Williams did not respond to his friend's call the following day, the police were called to do a welfare check, but they found the door locked and secured. Later that day, the friend climbed up to Williams's 3rd-story room from the outside using a ladder and saw that he was lying motionless in his bed. He was found deceased in his residence on December 22, 2025, at the age of 51, with early reports indicating no signs of foul play. A report issued the following month by the medical examiner's office in Orange County, Florida determined that Williams died of atherosclerosis and hypertensive heart disease, with obesity being a contributing factor.
