= The BillyBones =

American punk rock band

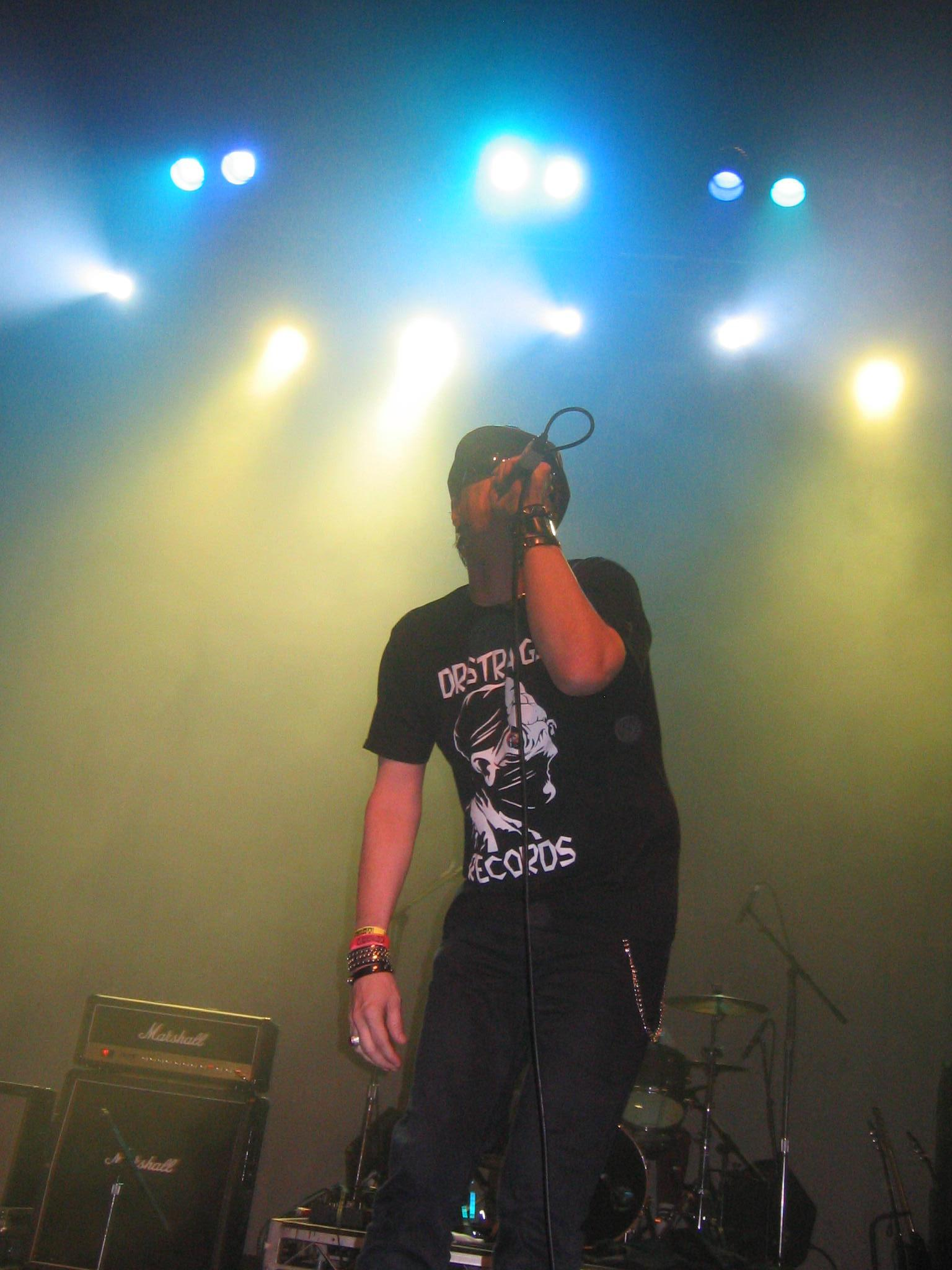
- Billy Bones performing at the Henry Fonda Theater, Los Angeles, 2007.

Background information
- Origin: Los Angeles, California
- Genres: Punk rock
- Years active: 2006–present
- Label: Dr. Strange Records
- Members: Billy Bones; Bad Otis Link; Easy Lou Jones; Dustin Snodgrass; Alex Gomez
- Past members: Drew Milford; Rob Blue; Alex Mack; Mike Livingston

The BillyBones is an American punk rock band. Based in Los Angeles, the band features Steven William "Billy Bones" Fortuna, formerly of The Skulls; drummer Alex Gomez, formerly of U.S. Bombs; tenor saxophonist Bad Otis Link; bassist Easy Lou Jones; and rhythm guitarist Dustin "Damone" Snodgrass.

== History ==
Billy Bones, lead singer the 1977 L.A. punk band The Skulls, as well as the band Forbidden Colors between 1979 and 1980, formed The BillyBones in 2006. The BillyBones released their debut 7-inch single We're Selfish on Dr. Strange Records in late 2007. Produced by Kevin Preston of the band Prima Donna, the record features two original songs and one cover. The A-side contains the title track and the song "All Excess". A cover of the song "Editions of You", originally performed by Roxy Music, takes up the B-side. In addition, saxophonist Aaron Minton of Prima Donna makes a guest appearance on "Editions of You".

The record has been described as "upbeat" and "catchy" with "a real full sound, without sounding at all over-produced." "Definitely top ten material."

The BillyBones released their first full-length album, The Complexity of Stupidity, in 2013 on Dr. Strange Records. Produced by Steve Fishman, the release features saxophone performances by visual artist Bad Otis Link.

== Discography ==
Singles

• We're Selfish (7-inch EP) - Dr. Strange Records - (2007)

Albums

• The Complexity of Stupidity (LP and CD) - Dr. Strange Records - (2013)
