= Much the Same =

American punk rock band

Much The Same
- Also known as: Don't Look Down (1999-2001)
- Origin: Chicago, Illinois, United States
- Genres: Punk rock; pop punk; skate punk; melodic hardcore
- Years active: 1999–2007, 2011, 2015-2024
- Labels: Nitro Records, Lockjaw Records, Thousand Islands Records, Pee Records, A-F Records
- Past members: Gunner McGrath; Frank Tsoukalas; Dan O'Gorman; Jevin Kaye; John Feliciano; Mike Ford; Mook Snoreck; Andy Simon; Adam Mufich; Matt Haraburda

Much The Same was a punk rock band from the suburbs of Chicago, Illinois, United States. Their style is based on the fast, melodic skate punk of the mid-to-late 1990s made popular by bands such as NOFX, Lagwagon, and No Use for a Name.

The band began in 1999 under the name Don't Look Down and changed to Much The Same in 2001 after a legal dispute with the now-defunct New Jersey band Don't Look Down. They released Quitters Never Win on A-F Records in 2003 and Survive in 2006.

The band announced their break-up on April 23, 2007 following their first European tour.

They reunited for a final farewell performance on March 26, 2011 at Reggies Rock Club in Chicago. The sold-out show featured both fan favorite songs and a few the band rarely, if ever, played live.

The band announced on March 30, 2015, that they had reunited. They released their third and final album, Everything is Fine, in July 2019. On July 8, 2024, the band released a statement that they had disbanded for good.

== History ==
Lead singer and guitarist Chris "Gunner" McGrath, bassist Andy Simon, and drummer, Mike "Mook" Snoreck, began playing together in 1999. Shortly after, Adam Mufich took over bass duties as the band went on to play their first appearance on the Vans Warped Tour in Chicago in 2000. Simon briefly rejoined the band on guitar for later rejoined as a second guitarist in time to record the Caught Off Guard EP. Simon and Mufich left together and were replaced by Frank Tsoukalas on bass and Matt Haraburda on guitar. Dan O'Gorman replaced Haraburda six months later to finally create the first stable lineup in 2001 around the same time that the name changed to Much The Same, which acknowledged their similarity to many other popular punk bands of the time.

In December 2001, the new lineup recorded a 3-song demo which got the band signed to Anti-Flag's label A-F Records, where they released their first full-length album, Quitters Never Win in 2003, which was recorded by 88 Fingers Louie and Rise Against guitarist Dan Precision at Bombshelter Studio in Des Plaines, IL. Reception was largely positive and the band's reputation grew as they played with bands like Bad Religion, Thrice, and Rise Against.

Much The Same again played the Chicago dates of Warped Tour in 2002 and 2003, when they won the Ernie Ball Battle of the Bands, earning them an Ernie Ball sponsorship and twelve dates on the 2004 Warped Tour.

Snoreck chose to leave the band early in 2004 and was replaced by Jevin Kaye, a drummer they'd met in St. Louis, Missouri, just as songwriting was beginning for their sophomore album. Friends and tourmates A Wilhelm Scream made introductions between Much The Same and Nitro Records, who signed the band and released Survive in 2006, which increased the band's audience and credibility further. The album was also released by Radtone Records in Japan, with an exclusive track called Seasons Change.

In April 2007, after the band's European tour, McGrath left the band, prompting their first breakup.

After recording a cover of Lagwagon's song Making Friends for the documentary A Fat Wreck, the band announced on March 30, 2015 that they reunited with former Break the Silence drummer, Mike Ford, on drums, followed shortly by a performance at Groezrock Festival in Belgium. In April, 2017, the band announced that Jevin had returned as the full-time drummer and would accompany them on their first South American tour supporting Face to Face and Ignite. John Feliciano replaced Dan O'Gorman on that tour after O'Gorman's Stage 3 Cancer diagnosis. Feliciano continued to fill in on guitar on later tours even when O'Gorman was able to join the tour, including notable performances at Brakrock Ecofest and Punk Rock Holiday.

In 2019, the band self-released their third and final album, Everything Is Fine, recorded by Nick Diener of The Swellers, which contained songs mostly written by O'Gorman before and during his cancer treatment. Vinyl editions of this album were released by Thousand Islands Records in Canada, Lockjaw Records in the UK, and Pee Records in Australia.

On July 3, 2020, Quitters Never Win was re-released on vinyl and digitally with an updated mix. Soon after, Concord Music released Survive on vinyl.

On November 28, 2021, Much the Same announced that Feliciano was joining the band as a permanent member.

On July 8, 2024, Much The Same posted a statement on their Instagram, announcing they are disbanding. McGrath posted his own statement that the breakup was due to increasing anxiety and the difficulty of maintaining a part-time band when the members lived in different states.

== Members ==
=== Final line-up ===
- Chris "Gunner" McGrath – vocals, guitar (1999–2007, 2011, 2015–2024)
- Franky Tsoukalas – bass, vocals (2001–2007, 2011, 2015–2024)
- Dan O'Gorman – guitar, vocals (2001–2007, 2011, 2015–2024)
- Jevin Kaye – drums (2003–2007, 2011, 2017–2024)
- John Feliciano – guitar (2021–2024)

=== Past members ===
- Mike Ford – drums (2015–2017)
- Mike "Mook" Snoreck – drums (1999–2003)
- Andy Simon – bass (1999), guitar, vocals (2000–2001)
- Adam Mufich – bass, vocals (1999–2001)
- Matt Haraburda – guitar (2001)

== Discography ==
=== Studio albums ===
- Quitters Never Win (2003, A-F Records)
- Survive (2006, Nitro Records)
- Everything Is Fine (2019, Lockjaw Records, Thousand Islands Records, Pee Records)

=== Extended plays ===
- Caught Off Guard EP (2001, Tank Records)

=== Compilations ===
- Fun With Dirt: The Greatest Bands You've Never Heard (1999, Fun With Dirt Records)
  - "Father & Son" (Original Version)
- Fun With Dirt 2: Songs You'll Like If You Have Good Taste (2000, Fun With Dirt Records)
  - "Sample"
- 2 Sugar Sampler Vol. 2 (2002, Jumpstart Records)
  - "Quitters Never Win" (Demo version)
  - "One of a Kind" (Demo version)
- I Killed Punk Rock (2006, Bouncing Betty Records)
  - "The Greatest Betrayal" (Demo Version)
- HAIR: Chicago Punk Cuts (2006, Thick Records)
  - "The Greatest Betrayal" (Alternate demo version)
- A Fat Wreck: The Compilation (2015)
  - "Making Friends" (Lagwagon cover)

== Trivia ==
- In their song "Wish," they use a quote from the film Boondock Saints.
- In their song "Moto," they use a quote from the film That Thing You Do!.
- Though having nothing to do with the movie, the title of "Miss the Pain" was inspired by a line in the movie Swingers.
- On the Japanese import of their album Survive there is a bonus track entitled "Seasons Change" featuring guest vocals and guitar by Nick Diener, lead singer of The Swellers.
