= Beyond Warped Live Music Series =

Studio album with live DVD by Guttermouth
- Released: 2005
- Recorded: 2004
- Genre: Punk rock
- Label: Immergent Records

Professional ratings
Review scores
Source	Rating
Allmusic	link

Beyond Warped Live Music Series is a Dualdisc DVD/CD by the Huntington Beach, California punk rock band Guttermouth, released in 2005 by Immergent Records. The DVD side of the disc contains a 9-song live performance by the band on the 2004 Warped Tour, filmed in high definition and mixed in 5.1 Dolby surround sound. It also contains audio tracks of the studio album versions of each song from the setlist. The CD side of the disc contains the studio album versions of all 9 songs from the setlist. Some of the songs are mistitled on the album sleeve and DVD menus.

== Track listing ==
All songs written by Guttermouth

1. "Party of Two (Your Table is Ready)" – 2:54
2. "1, 2, 3...Slam!" – 1:46
3. "Lucky the Donkey" – 1:45
4. "Do the Hustle"* – 2:10
5. "Wasted Lives" – 2:10
6. "Octopus Hairpiece" – 2:22
7. "Bruce Lee vs. the KISS Army" – 1:30
8. "Lipstick"** – 2:53
9. "Perfect World" – 1:54

*Mistitled as "Skater's Anthem" on album sleeve and DVD menu
**Mistitled as "Mom" on album sleeve and DVD menu

== Personnel ==
- Mark Adkins - vocals
- Scott Sheldon - guitar
- Donald Horne - guitar
- Kevin Clark - Bass
- Brian Scott Doyle - drums

== Album information ==
- Record label: Immergent Records
- Live DVD portion recorded on the 2004 Warped Tour
- All songs written by Mark Adkins and Scott Sheldon
