= Bullet Train to Vegas =

American rock band

Bullet Train To Vegas was a Southern California-based rock band. The band put out their debut EP Profile This in 2003, then a self-titled two-song 7" in 2004. They signed with Nitro Records the following year and released their debut full-length, We Put Scissors Where Our Mouths Are, in 2005. They named themselves after a song by Drive Like Jehu, and have been compared to At The Drive In, Fugazi, Pretty Girls Make Graves and Sparta. They broke up shortly after recording their second full-length album The City and None of the Above.

== Members ==
- Dan Sena - Vocals, Guitar (2001-2007)
- Marty Cornish - Drums (2003-2007)
- Greg Horton - Bass, Vocals (2004-2007)
- Erik Bailey - Guitar (2004-2007)

Past Members

- Thomas Coatney - Guitar (2001-2002)
- John Kelley - Drums (2001-2002)
- Steve Hutchison - Bass (2001-2002)
- Jeb Sprague - Guitar (2003-2004)
- Toby Sterrett - Bass (2003-2004)
- Jarrod Alexander - Drums (2001, demo)

== Discography ==
=== Album ===
- We Put Scissors Where Our Mouths Are (Nitro, 2005)
- The City and None of the Above (Unreleased, 2007)

=== Singles & EPs ===
- Boob Eaters Demo (Self-released, 2001)
- Profile This EP (Letterbomb, 2003)
- Bullet Train To Vegas 7" (Can't Never Could, 2004)
