= The Threats =

British punk band

The Threats are a punk band from Dalkeith and Edinburgh, Scotland. Originally formed in 1979 as the Reflectors, the band soon renamed themselves Threats.

== History ==
The Threats formed in 1979 as the Reflectors.

By the early 1980s, many punk rock acts had begun to explore political issues. The Threats followed this trend, writing songs that addressed contemporary social issues. Their song Iron Maiden was directed at Prime Minister Margaret Thatcher. Afghanistan, which featured on the B-side of the Go to Hell single, was a response to the Soviet war in Afghanistan.

The name of the band is actually "Threats" although often with "The " preceding the name.

The Casualties covered the Threats track "Underground Army" on one of their 1998 album of the same name.

=== Line-ups ===
The line-ups of the band over the years are as follows:

==== 1st line-up ====
- Jim Threat - Guitar
- Scott Mcleary - Vocals
- Gogsy Threat - Drums
- Joe Amos - bass

This line-up never recorded any material but did gig around Edinburgh in the late 1970s.

==== 2nd line-up ====
- Jim Threat - Vocals and Guitar
- Gogsy Threat - Guitar
- Joe Amos - Drums
- Ian Simpson - Bass Guitar

This Line up Recorded the Backlash compilation and features on the Demos and Rarities CD album.

==== 3rd line-up ====
- Jim Threat - Vocals
- Gogsy Threat - Guitar
- Tin - Bass Guitar
- Mick Amos - Drums

This Line up recorded the Go To Hell single and features on the Demos and Rarities CD album.

==== 4th line-up ====
- Jim Threat - Vocals
- Gogsy Threat - Guitar
- Mick Amos - Drums
- Dylan - Bass Guitar

This line-up recorded the Politicians and Ministers 6 Track EP and features on the Demos and Rarities CD album.

==== 5th line-up ====
- Jim Threat - Vocals and Guitar
- Craig Robertson - Drums
- Dave Threat - Bass Guitar

This line-up Recorded the Back In Hell 3 Track EP.

==== 6th line-up ====
- Jim Threat - Vocals and Guitar
- Craig Robertson - Drums
- Dave Threat - Bass Guitar
- Gogsy Threat - Guitar
- Davie Metal - Drums

This line-up recorded the 6 Track Back in Hell EP.

==== 7th line-up ====
- Jim Threat - Vocals and Guitar
- Dave Threat - Bass Guitar
- Gogsy Threat - Guitar
- Davie Metal - Drums

This line-up recorded the Twelve Punk Moves album and recorded the Live at CBGB's vinyl album.

==== 8th line-up ====
- Jim Threat - Vocals and Guitar
- Dave Threat - Bass Guitar
- Gogsy Threat - Guitar
- Rick - Drums

This line-up recorded the God Is Not With Us Today album.

==== 9th line-up ====
- Gogsy Threat - Vocals and Guitar
- Bobe - Bass Guitar
- Rab - Guitar
- Rick - Drums

==== 10th line-up ====
- Gogsy Threat - Vocals and Guitar
- Chris - Bass Guitar
- Rab - Guitar
- Rick - Drums

==== 11th line-up (current) ====
- Gogsy Threat - Guitar
- Chris - Bass Guitar
- Rab - Guitar
- Rick - Drums
- Kev - Vocals

==== 12th line-up ====
- Jim Threat - Vocals and Guitar
- Dave Threat - Bass Guitar
- Gogsy Threat - Guitar
- Rick - Drums

== Releases ==
The early vinyl record releases were:-

- Backlash (Playlist Records). 1 Track on a multi sampler EP : Members - Jim, Gogsy, Simpson, Amos
- Go to Hell (Rondelet Records). 3 track 7" Single c/w Afghanistan and Wasted : Members - Jim, Gogsy, Tin, Amos
- Politicians and Ministers (Rondelet Records). 3 Track 7" single c/w Writing on the wall and Dead End Depression. : Members - Jim, Gogsy, Amos, Dylan
- Politicians and Ministers (Rondelet Records). 6 Track 12" single c/w Writing on the wall, Dead End Depression, Can't Stop Me, Underground Army, 1980's. : Members - Jim, Gogsy, Amos, Dylan
- Back in Hell 3 track vinyl on Intimidation records Members : Jim, Craigy, Dave
- Back in Hell 6 Track CD on Punknite Records : Members - Jim, Craigy, Dave, Gogsy, Metal
- 12 Punk Moves Dr. Strange Records 2003 : Members - Jim, Gogsy, Dave, Metal
- Live at CBGB's Dr Strange Records 2003 : Members - Jim, Gogsy, Dave, Metal
- Demos and Rarities Dr Strange Records 2003: Members - Jim, Gogsy, Simpson, Amos, Tin, Dylan
- God is not with Us Today Dr Strange Records 2007: Members - Jim, Gogsy, Dave, Rick
- Live at the Banshee Labyrinth BandCamp 2019: Members - Gogsy, Rick, Rab, Chris, Kev
