= Quitters Never Win =

Studio album by Much the Same
- Released: May 13, 2003
- Genre: Punk rock, melodic hardcore
- Length: 33:10
- Label: A-F Records
- Producer: Mr. Precision

Much the Same chronology
Caught Off Guard (2001)	Quitters Never Win (2003)	Survive (2006)

Professional ratings
Review scores
Source	Rating
Allmusic	3.5/5 stars
Alternative Press	4/5 stars
PunkNews.org	4.5/5 stars

Quitters Never Win is the first full-length studio album by Much the Same.

== Track listing ==
1. "Wish" – 3:00
2. "Conclusion" – 2:31
3. "New Years" – 2:31
4. "Liar" – 3:03
5. "Masquerade" – 3:06
6. "Hits Home" – 3:21
7. "Quitters Never Win" – 3:14
8. "One of a Kind" – 2:21
9. "Miss the Pain" – 2:21
10. "Someday Not Soon" – 2:18
11. "Still Falling?" – 1:43
12. "Father and Son" – 3:41

== Personnel ==
- Gunner McGrath - Lead Vocals, Guitar, Piano
- Mook Snoreck - Drums
- Franky Tsoukalas - Bass, Vocals
- Dan O'Gorman - Guitar
- Mr. Precision - Producer, Engineer, Mixing, Guitar
- Dan Wintercorn - Additional Vocals

== Trivia ==
- "Wish" includes a quote from the movie The Boondock Saints.
