= Jughead's Revenge =

American punk rock band

- Origin: Los Angeles, California, U.S.
- Genres: Punk rock, skate punk, hardcore punk, melodic hardcore
- Years active: 1989–2001; 2009–present
- Labels: SBÄM Records; Lawsuit Records; Do It! Records; BYO Records; Nitro Records
- Members: Joe Doherty; Eric Bootow; AJ Condosta
- Past members: Brian Preiss; Craig Riker; Kevin Heller; Nenus Givargus; Jarrod Thornton; Ty Smith; Andy Alvarez; Joey Rimicci
- Website: juggsrevenge.com

Jughead's Revenge is an American punk rock band. They originally formed in Los Angeles, California, United States, in 1989. To date, Jughead's Revenge has released six studio albums (the most recent being 1999's Pearly Gates). After 12 years of recording and touring extensively, Jughead's Revenge disbanded in 2001 due to a lawsuit with Archie Comics who owned the rights to fictional character Jughead Jones. The band reformed in 2009 and has continued to perform at a number of live shows since 2010, and as of 2018 the band is working on a new album.

== History ==
=== Early years (1989–1992) ===
Jughead's Revenge was formed in 1989 when guitarist Joe Rimicci and Bassist Brian Preiss (ex Broadax members) were looking for a singer for their new band and met Joe Doherty through mutual friends in Rimicci's band Cholos on Acid. The three along with drummer Kevin Heller started the first line up.

After performing their first show together in 1989, Jughead's Revenge recorded their first album, Unstuck in Time, in the spring of 1990 on the band's Lawsuit Records with new drummer Nenus Givargis. Recorded in two days at Westbeach Recorders in Hollywood, the album was produced by Bad Religion guitarist Brett Gurewitz and engineered by Donnell Cameron. It was limited to one thousand copies pressed on black twelve-inch vinyl. In the summer of 1990, the band set out on their first tour of the U.S. with local punk outfit One Direction. With the money they made on the first tour the band released a single with live and studio songs from Unstuck in Time. Out of Beer, Out of Tune and Out of Control was released in 1991. Limited to a pressing of five hundred on blue seven-inch vinyl it featured live songs recorded at 924 Gilman Street in Berkeley, California on the previous tour. Also a live version of "Fabric of the Mind" was recorded for a split single with NOFX for Ox Fanzine in Germany.

Jughead's Revenge's second full-length, It's Lonely at the Bottom, was released in 1992. Recorded between tours at Westbeach Recorders (where the previous album was recorded), it was produced by Poison Idea's Thee Slayer Hippie and engineered by Donnell Cameron. Originally a CD only release on Cash Money Records in the U.S., it was pressed on twelve-inch vinyl on Do It! Records in Germany. The band set out on their first tour of Europe in the spring of 1992. After this, George Snow would go on to play in the Bad Samaritans full-time.

=== BYO years (1993–1995) ===
After touring in support for It's Lonely at the Bottom, the band went to work on its third full-length album, Elimination, which was released in 1994. Recorded in the winter of 1993 at Paramount Studios Hollywood by Barry Conley, Elimination was the first of the band's catalog to be licensed to and distributed by BYO Records in order to be able to tour more; Unstuck and Lonely followed shortly after. The band recorded an alternate version of "Unlimited" for a split single with Strung Out to be released on Fearless Records. Following the release of Elimination, drummer Nenus Givargis eventually left Jughead's Revenge for family-related business. The band also had gained enough local popularity to bypass local promoters and started running their own shows, which kept door prices low and people safe from violent security guards. They also used this to allow lesser known bands from out of the area to be able to play where more commercial promoters would not have given them a chance. Those bands included Green Day, The Offspring and Blink-182.

In 1994, Jughead's Revenge set out on their first tour of Canada, supporting Face to Face. That was followed by a B-sides and rarities compilation, 13 Kiddie Favorites, which also marked its first release with new drummer Jarrod Thornton. Recorded in 1995 at Paramount Studios and produced by Barry Conley, it was originally meant for European release only on Do It! Records in Germany. One song, "49/61", was given to American label Liberation Records for the Punk Sucks compilation. The band later licensed 13 Kiddie Favorites to BYO in 1995. A video for "49/61" appeared on the Cinema Beer Goggles video compilation from Hopeless Records that same year. In 1996, the band did a number of compilations that featured mostly covers of bands they all grew up listening to. Punk Rock Jukebox contains a version of "Hitman" from the Plasmatics, and Before You Were Punk features "Young Turks" by Rod Stewart. Jughead's Revenge also released a split single with Lagwagon in 1995 that contains a version of "Just to Get Away" from Poison Idea as well as recording a version of "Jerkin' Back and Forth" by Devo for the We Are NOT Devo tribute compilation, produced by Jim Goodwin.

=== Final years, lawsuit and breakup (1995–2001) ===
In 1995, Jughead's Revenge signed to Nitro Records, founded by The Offspring frontman Dexter Holland, and released their fourth full-length album, Image Is Everything, a year later. Produced by The Vandals' Warren Fitzgerald, it was recorded at Paramount Studios and was engineered by Barry Conley. With this album, the band started including Joe and Brians lifelong passion of surf music into the line-up both on recordings and live on European tours. These included "Rumble at Waikiki" by Jon and the Nightriders and originals like "Skag Up My Ass". Jarrod Thornton soon left Jughead's Revenge and was replaced by former Vandals drummer Ty Smith. The band also hired Craig Riker as its second guitarist.

After the release of Image Is Everything, the band took time off from a relentless tour schedule to write their fifth full-length album, Just Joined, which was released the following year. Recorded at Westbeach Recorders (where their first two albums were recorded), it was produced by Face to Face's Trever Keith and engineered by Donnell Cameron. Andy Alvarez of Stranded would join as full-time drummer after the first leg on the US tour.

In 1999, Jughead's Revenge released their final album Pearly Gates, not long before the end of the Archie Comics lawsuit. Recorded by then-Death by Stereo bassist Paul Miner at For The Record in Orange, California, it was a good bye letter to friends and fans in hopes of going into a hiatus after years of touring and recording. Jughead's Revenge's last tour took place in 2001, throughout the U.S. and Canada with the plan of an undetermined hiatus after the tour.

In 2000, Archie Comics reached a settlement with Nitro Records, not requesting financial compensation if the band agreed to stop use of any likeness resembling the Jughead Jones character and changed their name to Jugg's Revenge. Shortly thereafter, Nitro announced the breakup of the band.

=== Reunion (2009–present) ===
In December 2009, it was announced that Jughead's Revenge would reunite to play shows for their twentieth anniversary in early 2010. Frontman Joe Doherty noted that the band had "been in rehearsal for a couple of weeks now" but were not going to announce "anything until some shows" are booked for March. Members of the band will still be in their other projects such as Kill Detail, Cellphish and Black Fag. Joe Doherty co-hosts the podcast Raised by Wolves.

Asked if the band was planning a new album and tour, Doherty replied "we have been tinkering around with some new stuff, but are sticking with whats in front of us which is picking what songs we are going to do in March, it's boiled down to about 40 songs right now but will go down from there. Then do a string of shows in California, Arizona, New Mexico and Nevada."

Jughead's Revenge's first reunion show took place at the Scotland Yard in Canoga Park, California on March 20, 2010. After this, guitarist Joey Rimicci went to Europe with one of his latest projects Black Fag in April and then Jughead's Revenge resumed their reunion tour schedule throughout the year.

On April 1, 2010, Jughead's Revenge, along with The Darlings, supported Bad Religion at the House of Blues in Anaheim. Their history with Bad Religion dates back to the early 1990s, when they supported them for a few dates on the Against the Grain tour and guitarist Brett Gurewitz produced the first Jughead's Revenge album Unstuck in Time.

By June 2011, Andy Alvarez was no longer drumming in Jughead's Revenge, and was replaced by A.J. Condosta.

In a July 2011 interview, frontman Joe Doherty stated that Jughead's Revenge was working on 7" releases with new material.

On February 4, 2018, Jughead's Revenge teased their first album in nearly 20 years via Twitter.

The band released their EP Vultures on SBÄM Records on May 5, 2023.

== Members ==
=== Current members ===
- Joe Doherty − vocals (1989–2001, 2009–present)
- Eric Bootow − bass (2009–present)
- A.J. Condosta − drums (2011–present)

=== Former ===
- Brian Preiss − bass (1989–2001)
- George Snow − guitar (1989–1993)
- Craig Riker − guitar (1996–1999)
- Kevin Heller − drums (1989)
- Nenus Givargus − drums (1989–1994)
- Jarrod Thornton − drums (1994–1996)
- Ty Smith − drums (1996–1998)
- Andy Alvarez − drums (1998–2001, 2009–2011)
- Joey Rimicci − guitar (1989–2001, 2009–2025, his death)

== Discography ==
=== Studio albums ===
- Unstuck in Time (1990)
- It's Lonely at the Bottom (1992)
- Elimination (1994)
- Image Is Everything (1996)
- Just Joined (1998)
- Pearly Gates (1999)

=== Compilation albums ===
- It's Lonely at the Bottom/Unstuck in Time (1995)
- 13 Kiddie Favorites (1995)

=== Compilation appearances ===
Jughead's Revenge has been featured on the following compilation albums:

- Welcome to Califucknia (Signal Sound Systems Records, 1993)
- Punk Sucks (Liberation Records, 1994)
- Go Ahead Punk... Make My Day (Nitro Records, 1996)
- Before You Were Punk (Vagrant Records, 1997)
- We Are NOT Devo (Centipede, 1997)
- Deep Thoughts (album) (Nitro Records, 1998)
- Short Music For Short People (Fat Wreck Chords, 1999)
- Punk Goes Metal (Fearless Records, 2000)
- The Thought Remains the Same (Nitro Records, 2000)
- Punk Rock Jukebox (Cherry, 2002)
- Farewell to Venice (BDF Records, 2006)
