= Kathy Kolla =

American filmmaker

- Kathy Kolla at the Downtown Film Festival Los Angeles in 2015.
- Occupation(s): Film director, Actor and Screenwriter
- Years active: 2003–present

Kathy Kolla is an American director, screenwriter, and actress.

== Biography ==
Her films include Plastic Daydream starring Shari Belafonte, the feature documentary Who Is Billy Bones? and the comedy Another Day, Another Dime.

She was awarded Best Director for the drama Plastic Daydream at the LA Live Film Festival in 2018.

Her debut short film, Another Day, Another Dime won the 2009 Audience Choice award at the Flint Film Festival in Flint, Michigan. Another Day, Another Dime was subsequently sold to the television network ShortsHD in 2014, and began airing in the United States on November 16, 2014. In 2011, Kolla directed a public service announcement featuring the singer Johnny Mathis for the Nat King Cole charity, Nat King Cole Generation Hope. Her environmental documentary The Great Los Angeles River was also awarded second-place honors at the 2013 Going Green Film Festival.

As an actress, Kolla has had roles in the television series American Dreams, Arrested Development and Eve. She is a vegan.

Kolla's debut feature film Who Is Billy Bones? premiered at the Downtown Film Festival Los Angeles in 2015. The documentary focuses on the life of Steven “Billy Bones” Fortuna, lead singer of the early Los Angeles punk rock band The Skulls. Who Is Billy Bones? was acquired by the cable television network KCETLink Media Group in 2016. It began airing nationwide on LinkTV and in Southern California on KCET in June 2016.
