= Elimination (album) =

Studio album by Jughead's Revenge
- Released: May 9, 1994
- Recorded: December 1993
- Studio: Paramount Studios, Hollywood, California
- Genre: Punk rock Skate punk Hardcore punk Melodic hardcore
- Label: BYO Records
- Producer: Jughead's Revenge, Barry Conley

Jughead's Revenge chronology
It's Lonely at the Bottom (1992)	Elimination (1994)	It's Lonely at the Bottom/Unstuck in Time (1995)

Elimination is Jughead's Revenge's third studio album, released in 1994. It was the first of the band's catalog to be licensed to and distributed by BYO Records. Although Elimination was not commercially successful, Jughead's Revenge gained critical recognition for the album and supported Face to Face on their first Canadian tour.

Elimination marked the first Jughead's Revenge album to be recorded as a four-piece; second guitarist George Snow had left the band in 1993 to play in the Bad Samaritans full-time. It was also their last album to feature drummer Nenus Givargus, who left for family related business.

== Track listing ==
All tracks by Joe Doherty & Joey Rimicci except where noted.

1. "Eliminator" – 2:12
2. "True Enemy" – 1:46
3. "Silver Spoon" (Doherty) – 2:05
4. "Measured in Time" – 3:05
5. "Show the World" – 2:15
6. "Angels" (Doherty, Brian Priess) – 1:43
7. "C-Biscuit" – 1:55
8. "Red" – 2:19
9. "Breaking Worlds" – 1:48
10. "Do and Die" – 3:38
11. "Get By" – 1:46
12. "The Message" – 2:12
13. "Unlimited" – 2:48
14. "Surfin' And Spyin' (The Go-Go's cover)" (Caffey, Smith) – 3:11

== Personnel ==
- Joe Doherty − vocals
- Joey Rimicci − guitar
- Brian Preiss − bass
- Nenus Givargus − drums
