= It's Lonely at the Bottom =

1992 album by punk rock band Jughead's Revenge

Studio album by Jughead's Revenge
- Released: 1992
- Recorded: June 1992
- Studio: Westbeach Recorders
- Genre: Punk rock Skate punk Hardcore punk Melodic hardcore
- Label: Hard Record (self-produced)
- Producer: Thee Slayer Hippie

Jughead's Revenge chronology
Unstuck in Time (1990)	It's Lonely at the Bottom (1992)	Elimination (1994)

Professional ratings
Review scores
Source	Rating
Sputnikmusic	4.5/5 stars

It's Lonely at the Bottom is Jughead's Revenge's second studio album, released in 1992. This marked the second and last album recorded as a five-piece, as guitarist George Snow left the band to play in the Bad Samaritans full-time. Jughead's Revenge continued as a four-piece, until 1998's Just Joined.

The album was re-released in 1995 by BYO Records along with the band's previous album, Unstuck in Time, as the 28-track compilation It's Lonely at the Bottom/Unstuck in Time.

== Track listing ==
No.	Title	Length
1.	"Fabric of the Mind"	2:18
2.	"Burn"	2:05
3.	"Thorn of My Rose"	1:18
4.	"Angry"	1:38
5.	"I Remember"	1:03
6.	"People Bomb"	1:39
7.	"Stabbed in the Back"	1:29
8.	"Whom Gods Destroy"	1:23
9.	"Love Me Tender" (Elvis Presley cover)	2:21
10.	"The Real World"	1:35
11.	"Deny Myself"	2:11
12.	"When the Party's Over"	1:52
13.	"Alone"	4:07
14.	"Flower Child"	2:07
15.	"Divided"	1:28
16.	"The Last, Last Laugh"	2:20

== Personnel ==
- Joe Doherty - vocals
- Joey Rimicci − guitar
- George Snow − guitar
- Brian Preiss − bass
- Nenus Givargus − drums
