= Jon and the Nightriders =

- Origin: Riverside, California
- Genres: Surf rock
- Years active: 1979–2001
- Labels: Voxx, Enigma Records, Line Records
- Website: johnblair.us

Jon & The Nightriders was an American instrumental surf music band known formed in Southern California in 1979. Fundamentally consisting of guitarist/songwriter John Blair, the band is credited for ushering in a renewed interest in the instrumental surf music genre, which had fallen out of popular favor since the popularity of The Beatles. The band name comes from a combination of the name of the Dick Dale song "Night Rider" and an alternate spelling of Blair's first name.

== History ==
=== Origins And Early Years ===
The band was formed by guitarist/record collector John Blair in 1979 after experiencing a tremendous interest in the book he had published the year before, The Illustrated Discography Of Surf Music: 1959-1965.

Blair had wanted to make a modern surf record since 1963, but when he realized how many people were also interested in the obscure genre, he finally put his plan into action. He first recruited Jeff Nicholson (AKA Niki Syxx), who had played bass at an impromptu jam session during the release party for the book. Next, he reached out to Dusty Watson, a friend of Nicholson's who was playing drums in the punk rock band The Press. Blair then recruited LA session guitarist Ed Black, who agreed to record for the record, but used the pseudonym Eddy B'Gianni (a combination of Duane Eddy and "Johnny B. Goode").

On July 22, 1979, John, Jeff, Dusty and Ed recorded four songs at a friend's house using two Teac four-track tape decks. These recordings would be pressed that August as a 7" EP on blue vinyl on their own California label simply titled Jon & The Nightriders.

Bomp Records owner and publisher of the music magazine Who Put The Bomp, Greg Shaw, heard the EP and was so impressed, he offered to release a full-length album. Over the course of 3 days in April, 1980, they recorded the material for their debut full-length Surf Beat '80. However, soon after, due to contractual obligations, Ed Black left the band, but local Riverside guitarist Dave Wronski jumped on board for the final recording session the next month. In his liner notes, Dick Dale wrote "I was so inspired by this record that it just might be the time to pick up my gold Fender Stratocaster, come out of retirement and, once again, share with the people what I've experienced on stage and on records. Once again we'll be one bunch of dancing surfers! Jon & The Nightriders have done their homework!"

A 7" EP and 12" LP had been recorded and released, but the band had still not played a single live show. All of this changed on Oct. 3, 1980, when they were booked as the opening act for the historic Surf Beat '80 concert at the Santa Monica Civic Auditorium, featuring headliners The Surf Punks and Dick Dale & His Del-Tones. The booking agent was so impressed, they proceeded to book the band at important, influential venues such as The Roxy and The Starwood, mixed in with more contemporary acts in the punk and new wave genres. As the press and fans caught wind of what was happening, the band continued to get prime bookings at The Whisky A Go-Go, The Troubadour, Madame Wong's West and The Golden Bear.

As early as December 1980, plans got underway for a second full-length release. Rather than go the typical route of another studio record, it was decided to record a live concert because of the reputation the band was acquiring for the high energy and attitude at their shows. This turned into a two night recording session on Jan. 9 and 10th, 1981 at the world famous Whisky A Go-Go on the Sunset Strip in West Hollywood, CA. The official full-length album Recorded Live At Hollywood's Famous Whisky A Go-Go was released in March 1981 on the Voxx label.

== Legacy ==
The punk rock band Jughead's Revenge included "Rumble at Waikiki" on their 1996 full-length Image Is Everything.

The songs "Fuel Injected" and "Surf Jam" were featured in the film, Surf II

The German surf band The Looney Tunes included a cover of "Rumble At Waikiki" on their 1993 full-length Cool Surfin'.

The Spanish surf band The Longboards included a cover of "Rumble At Waikiki" on their 2017 full-length 9 Surf Shots.

The British surf band The Surf Creatures included a cover of "Rumble At Waikiki" on their 1997 full-length X50.

Jerry Mac Neish included a cover of "Rumble At Waikiki" on his 1988 full-length Drive-In Guitars.

The surf band The Halibuts included a live cover of "Rumble At Waikiki" on their full-length Live At Toes, which also appears on their greatest hits compilation Hangin' Fourteen from 2019.

The surf band Slacktone included a live cover of "Rumble At Waikiki" on their 2005 release Rough Surf, Rough Mix, Live In Berlin.

The Spanish surf band The Panteras included a cover of "Rumble At Waikiki" on their 2010 full-length Introducing The Exciting Dry Surf Of The Fabulous....

"Beneath The Reef" from Stampede was featured in the Showtime TV movie The Cool And The Crazy in 1995

"Depth Charge" was used in the 1995 movie trailer for Destiny Turns On The Radio

== Band Members ==
=== Jon & The Nightriders 7" EP, Surf Beat '80 (1979-1980) ===
Sources:

- John Blair - Lead Guitar
- Ed Black - Rhythm Guitar
- Dusty Watson - Drums
- Niki Syxx - Bass

=== Recorded Live At The World Famous Whisky A Go-Go (1981) ===
- John Blair - Lead Guitar
- Dave Wronski - Rhythm Guitar
- Dusty Watson - Drums
- Niki Syxx - Bass

=== California Fun 7" EP, Charge Of The Nightriders (1981-1984) ===
Sources:

- John Blair - Lead Guitar
- Dave Wronski - Rhythm Guitar
- Greg Eckler - Drums
- Jeff Nicholson (Niki Syxx) - Bass

=== Stampede! (1986) ===
- John Blair - All Guitars
- Dusty Watson - Drums
- Jeff Nicholson - Bass
- George White - Saxophone

=== Fiberglass Rocket, Thunder Over Rincon 7" Single, Raw & Alive '98, Moving Target, Undercover (1996-2000) ===
Sources:

- John Blair - Lead Guitar
- Dave Wronski - Rhythm Guitar
- Dusty Watson -Drums
- Pete Curry - Bass

== Discography ==
- 1979: (EP) Jon and the Nightriders ["Rumble At Waikiki" / "Bustin' Surfboards" / "Ali Baba" / "Squad Car"] (California Records)
- 1980: Surf Beat '80 (Voxx Records (Bomp!))
- 1981: Recorded Live at Hollywood's Famous Whisky a Go-Go (Voxx Records)
- 1981: (EP) California Fun! (Line Records [Germany])
- 1982: (EP) Splashback! (prod. by Shel Talmy, Invasion Records)
- 1984: Charge of the Nightriders (prod. by Shel Talmy, Enigma)
- 1987: Stampede! (Rockhouse Kix 4 U [Netherlands]
- 1996: Fiberglass Rocket (Atomic Beat/AVI)
- 1998: Raw & Alive '98 (Gee-Dee Music [Germany])
- 1999: Moving Target (Gee-Dee Music [Germany])
- 2000: Undercover (Surf Waves [Belgium])

Compilation

- 2018: Rumble at Waikiki: The John Blair Anthology (Bear Family) 2-CD
