= Teri Yakimoto =

Studio album by Guttermouth
- Released: May 7, 1996
- Recorded: 1996
- Genres: Punk rock, Ska punk, Skate punk
- Length: 40:13
- Label: Nitro
- Producers: Ryan Greene, Guttermouth

Guttermouth chronology
Friendly People (1994)	Teri Yakimoto (1996)	Musical Monkey (1997)

Professional ratings
Review scores
Source	Rating
AllMusic	2/5 stars

Teri Yakimoto is the third album by the Huntington Beach, California punk rock band Guttermouth, released in 1996 by Nitro Records. It was their first album with bass player Steve Rapp and continued the band's style of fast, abrasive punk rock with tongue-in-cheek humor and sarcastic lyrics. This time, however, the band experimented with more melody and pop influence. By all accounts the recording process was plagued with problems, and at one point most of the recordings were scrapped and re-recorded with a new producer. A music video was filmed for the song “Whiskey” and the album became the band's only to reach the Billboard Heatseekers chart, reaching #33.

== Track listing ==
All songs written by Guttermouth except "Casserole of Life" by Dan Root and Guttermouth, and "Under the Sea"

1. "Use Your Mind" 1:51
2. "Trinket Trading, Tick Toting, Toothless, Tired Tramps...or the 7 T's" 2:17
3. "Generous Portions" 1:43
4. "A Day at the Office" 2:25
5. "Teri Yakimoto" 3:27
6. "Whiskey" 2:21
7. "Lock Down" 3:52
8. "God's Kingdom" 2:29
9. "Mark's Ark" 1:42
10. "Room for Improvement" 2:19
11. "Casserole of Life" 2:53
12. "Thought Provoking Sonic Device" 2:09
13. "I Saw the Light" 2:58
14. "1-2-3-4"* 6:30
15. "Under the Sea" 1:10

*"1-2-3-4" is a medley of 4 short songs: "Give Me a Gun," "Food for Thought," "Gar-bage (gar'bij), a Perfect Example of Uninteresting Poetry," and "Up Your Bum."

== Performers ==
- Mark Adkins - vocals
- Scott Sheldon - guitar
- Eric "Derek" Davis - guitar
- Steve "Stever" Rapp - bass
- James Nunn (aka Captain James T. Nunn) - drums

== Album information ==
- Record label: Nitro Records
- Recorded at Fat Planet Studios by Ryan Greene
- Additional recording at Westbeach Recorders by Steve Kravac
- Produced by Ryan Greene and Guttermouth
- Additional production by Steve Kravac with assistance by Adam Kramer
- Mastered by Eddie Schrayer at Futuredisc
- Design and layout by Daredevil Studios and C. Martin
- Band photo by Paul Cobb

== Charts ==
Chart (1996)	Peak position
US Heatseekers (Billboard)	33
