= The Letters Organize =

- Origin: Atlanta, Georgia, USA
- Genres: Hardcore punk Post-hardcore
- Years active: 2002–2006, 2010–present
- Label: Nitro
- Past members: Brent Jay, Garrett Range, Donnie Adkinson, Casey Maxwell, Zach Hinkle, Derek Wallace
- Website: The Letters Organize Nitro Records Page

The Letters Organize is a five-piece band from Atlanta, Georgia that was signed to Nitro Records. The band officially broke up in November 2006. The members of the band have all remained in Atlanta and formed new bands, most notably, "It's Elephant's" who released their first full-length album in 2008 called "Little Trouble in China Town" then in 2009 their follow-up album "Gets Along". It's Elephant's finished their 3rd LP called "The Of Corpse Session" due out in late 2010.

They were a supporting band for The Offspring in their 2005 Tour along with Send More Paramedics.

The Letters Organize officially announced their return in March 2010.

== Bio ==
The Letters Organize formed in 2002 in Atlanta, Georgia. The band's members are Brent Jay (vocalist), Garrett Range (bass and vocals), Donnie Adkinson (Drums), Casey Maxwell (Guitar), and Zach Hinkle (Guitar). Taking influences from bands such as Refused and other post-hardcore bands while incorporating their own style of schizophrenic rock and roll, the band recorded their first EP "Everyone Goes Yeah...Bash!" on Brand Name Records which would subsequently be re-released as "The Cure" later. Their sound earned them recognition in the independent music scene, playing with bands such as Vaux and the SXSW Festival. Nitro Records soon took interest and signed the band, releasing their only full-length "Dead Rhythm Machine" in early 2005, to much critical acclaim from magazines such as Alternative Press among many others.

== Final Line-Up ==
- Brent Jay - Vocals
- Garrett Range - Bass/Vocals
- Donnie Adkinson - Drums
- Casey Maxwell - Guitar
- Zach Hinkle - Guitar

== Other Members ==
- Chris Diehm - Guitar
- Ben Smith - Good Times/Lights/Other
- Jeremiah Martin - Guitar

== Discography ==
- Dead Rhythm Machine - ("Nitro Records" ) 2005
- The Cure - ("In At the Deep End Records!" UK Re-release) 2004
- The Cure / Song Of Hope - ("Everyone Goes Yeah...Bash!" Re-release) 2003
- Everyone Goes Yeah! Bash... EP - Unknown date
