= Gunner McGrath =

American singer

- Born: Christopher Leslie McGrath; September 29, 1978 (age 47)
- Origin: Berwyn, Illinois
- Genres: Punk rock Pop punk Skate punk Melodic hardcore
- Instruments: Vocals, guitar
- Years active: 1996–2007, 2011, 2015-Present
- Labels: Nitro Records, A-F Records

Christopher Leslie "Gunner" McGrath (born September 29, 1978) is the American founder, lead singer, and guitarist of the punk rock band Much The Same. In April 2007, he quit Much The Same citing an overwhelming frustration with the music industry, and the lifestyle of a touring musician. From 2009 to 2011, he was part of the Willow Creek Community Church Studio Choir. On March 30, 2015, Much The Same reunited released their third album, Everything Is Fine, in 2019. In July 2020, McGrath joined the band Winning Streak, and recorded vocals for their album, We Need a Plan.

== Discography ==
=== Studio albums ===
- 1998 - Peabody Myers - Twice the Conviction (lead vocals, guitar, piano)
- 2001 - Much The Same - Caught Off Guard (lead vocals, guitar)
- 2003 - Much The Same - Quitters Never Win (lead vocals, guitar)
- 2003 - Anti-Flag - The Terror State (backing vocals)
- 2004 - Break the Silence - Near Life Experience (backing vocals)
- 2005 - Last Annual - Last Annual (backing vocals)
- 2006 - Anti-Flag - For Blood and Empire (backing vocals)
- 2006 - Much The Same - Survive (lead vocals, guitar, piano)
- 2007 - Anti-Flag - A Benefit for Victims of Violent Crime (backing vocals)
- 2010 - Opposite Way - Just a Matter of Time (backing vocals)
- 2011 - A New Liturgy - No. 1: God is Love (backing vocals)
- 2011 - Trick Shots - Dreamers Never Die (guest vocals)
- 2017 - Bates Motel - High Expectations Higher Deceptions (guest vocals)
- 2018 - Winning Streak - Whichever Path You Take (guest vocals)
- 2019 - Much The Same - Everything Is Fine (lead vocals, guitar)
- 2020 - Winning Streak - We Need a Plan (backing vocals)

=== Compilations ===
- 1999 - Fun With Dirt: The Greatest Bands You've Never Heard
  - Don't Look Down "Father & Son" (lead vocals, guitar)
- 2000 - Fun With Dirt 2: Songs You'll Like If You Have Good Taste
  - Don't Look Down "Sample" (lead vocals, guitar)
  - Never Fails "Big Surprise" (guitar, Vocals)
- 2002 - 2 Sugar Sampler Vol. 2
  - Much The Same "Quitters Never Win", "One of a Kind" (lead vocals, guitar)
- 2004 - Rock Against Bush, Vol. 1
  - Anti-Flag "The School of Assassins" (backing vocals)
- 2006 - I Killed Punk Rock
  - Much The Same "The Greatest Betrayal (Demo Version)" (lead vocals, guitar)
- 2006 - HAIR: Chicago Punk Cuts
  - Much The Same "The Greatest Betrayal" (lead vocals, guitar)
- 2015 - A Fat Wreck
  - [Much The Same] "Making Friends" (lead vocals)
