= Shave the Planet =

Studio album by Guttermouth
- Released: August 22, 2006
- Genre: Punk rock
- Length: ~22:23
- Label: Volcom Entertainment

Guttermouth chronology
Eat Your Face (2004)	Shave the Planet (2006)

Professional ratings
Review scores
Source	Rating
Allmusic	2/5 stars

Shave the Planet is the ninth album by the Huntington Beach, California punk rock band Guttermouth, released in 2006 by Volcom Entertainment. It continued the band's style of fast, abrasive punk rock with tongue-in-cheek humor and sarcastic lyrics. The album was their first to feature drummer Ryan Farrell, and also marked the return of founding bassist Clint Weinrich, and was the final album to feature founding member Scott Sheldon and guitarist of four years Don Horne.

== Track listing ==
All songs written by Guttermouth

1. "Shave the Planet"
2. "Capitalizing from Plump Mistakes"
3. "My Chemical Imbalance"
4. "Flacidism"
5. "Primate Camp"
6. "The 23 Things That Rhyme with Darby Crash"
7. "'Mark' the Cubby Chaser/Newport Sweater Fat"
8. "What Then"
9. "God, Steve McQueen 'The Work Song'"
10. "Upside Down Space Cockroach"

== Performers ==
- Mark Adkins – vocals
- Scott Sheldon – guitar
- Donald "Don" Horne – guitar
- Clint Weinrich – bass
- Ryan Farrell – drums
- Jim Susoeff and David V. – backing vocals

== Album information ==
- Record label: Volcom Entertainment
- Recorded and mixed by Scott Sheldon and Donald Horne at the Volcom Boathouse
- Produced by Scott Sheldon and Donald Horne
- Mastered by Gene Grimaldi
- Art and layout by Ryan Immegart, based on concept by Mark Adkins
