= Gusto (album) =

Studio album by Guttermouth
- Released: August 13, 2002
- Genre: Punk rock
- Length: 34:57
- Label: Epitaph

Guttermouth chronology
Covered with Ants (2001)	Gusto (2002)	Live at the House of Blues (2003)

Professional ratings
Review scores
Source	Rating
AllMusic	1.5/5 stars

Gusto is the seventh album by California punk rock band Guttermouth, released in 2002 by Epitaph Records. It found the band taking their style of fast, abrasive punk rock in new directions, experimenting with elements of pop and other styles. Their usual tongue-in-cheek humor and sarcastic lyrics remain intact, but the album's overall sound is quite different from any of their others. This was due partly to a lineup change: founding member and frequent songwriter James Nunn had left the group the previous year, leaving guitarists Scott Sheldon and Eric Davis to fill in on bass, along with studio bassist Hedge. The album received generally poor reviews from both critics and longtime fans, and would later be regarded by the band as somewhat of a failed experiment.

== Track listing ==
All songs written by Guttermouth.

1. "Camp Fire Girl #62" 2:55
2. "Scholarship in Punk" 2:15
3. "Gusto" 2:13
4. "Vacation" 2:52
5. "Contagious" 2:51
6. "Pee in the Shower" 2:29
7. "Walk of Shame" 2:34
8. "My Town" 2:36
9. "Contribution" 2:17
10. "Foot-Long" 1:56
11. "Looking Out for #1" 1:48
12. "Twins" 2:09
13. "My Girlfriend" 2:35
14. "Lemon Water" 3:19

== Performers ==
- Mark Adkins – vocals
- Scott Sheldon – guitar, bass, guiro, backing vocals
- Eric "Derek" Davis – guitar, bass, keyboards, vocals
- Hedge – bass (tracks 1, 2, 5, 6 & 11)
- William Tyler "Ty" Smith – drums
- Eric Mayron – vocals on "Lemon Water"
- Emily "Agent M" Whitehurst (Tsunami Bomb) – backing vocals on "My Town" and "Twins"

== Album information ==
- Record label: Epitaph Records
- Recorded at Paramount Studios and Can Am Studios
- Mixed at Paramount Studios by Jim Goodwin
- Mastered by Gene Grimaldi at Oasis Mastering
- Produced by Scott Sheldon, Eric Davis, Jim Goodwin, and Mark Adkins
- All songs by Guttermouth
- Art by Mark Adkins
- Layout by C. Martin
