= Live from the Pharmacy =

Live album by Guttermouth
- Released: 1998
- Genre: Punk rock
- Length: 34:25
- Label: Nitro

Guttermouth chronology
Musical Monkey (1997)	Live from the Pharmacy (1998)	Gorgeous (1999)

Live from the Pharmacy is the fifth album by the Huntington Beach, California punk rock band Guttermouth, released in 1998 by Nitro Records. It was the band's first live album and consists of a live concert performance from 1994 and 4 new tracks recorded in 1998.

The live portion of the album was recorded when the band was kicked off of a tour in South Carolina due to their outrageous behavior, so they booked some shows at a local club and recorded them. These live tracks feature original bass player Clint Weinrich. The studio tracks were recorded with Steve Rapp, who replaced Weinrich in 1995, and were recorded by Vandals guitarist Warren Fitzgerald.

== Track listing ==
All songs written by Guttermouth except where noted

1. "Oats" (live)
2. "Just a Fuck" (live)
3. "Where Was I?" (live)
4. "Disneyland" (live)
5. "Chicken Box" (live)
6. "Jamie's Petting Zoo" (live)
7. "Marco-Polo" (live)
8. "Pot" (live)
9. "No Such Thing" (live)
10. "Race Track" (live)
11. "Bruce Lee vs. The KISS Army" (live)
12. "1, 2, 3...Slam!" (live)
13. "Veggicide" (live)
14. "What's Gone Wrong" (live) (Davis)
15. "Derek" (live)
16. "Asshole" (live)
17. "American Made"
18. "This Won't Hurt a Bit"
19. "Steak (The Underwater Version)"
20. "Born in the U.S.A."

== Performers ==
- Mark Adkins - vocals
- Scott Sheldon - guitar
- Eric "Derek" Davis - guitar
- Clint Weinrich - bass (tracks 1–16)
- Steve "Stever" Rapp - bass (tracks 17–20)
- James Nunn (aka Captain James T. Nunn) - drums

== Album information ==
- Record label: Nitro Records
- Live tracks recorded Summer 1994 by Jay Matheson at the Jam Room in South Carolina
- Studio tracks recorded May 1998 at Stall #2 and Formula One by Warren Fitzgerald
- Studio tracks mixed by Jim Goodwin at Westbeach Recorders
- Mastered by Eddie Schrayer at Oasis Mastering
- All songs copyright Uncomfortably Humid Music, BMI
- Art by Steve Rapp
