= Caught Off Guard =

EP by Much the Same
- Released: 2001
- Genre: Punk rock, skate punk
- Length: 16:39
- Label: Tank Records
- Producer: Much the Same

Much the Same chronology
Caught Off Guard (2001)	Quitters Never Win (2003)

Caught Off Guard is the first EP by Much the Same. At the time, the band was called Don't Look Down. This EP is now out of print and only available at DownloadPunk.com with a bonus track from the same recording session.

== Track listing ==
1. "Moto" – 2:24
2. "Here I Am" – 2:27
3. "Liar" – 3:03
4. "Crying Wolf" – 3:36
5. "Someday Not Soon" – 2:14
6. "Here All Along" – 2:55
7. "Cop Out" (Bonus Track) – 2:35

== Personnel ==
- Gunner McGrath - lead vocals, guitar
- Mook Snoreck - drums
- Adam Mufich - Bass, vocals
- Andy Simon - guitar, vocals
- Fergus Daly - engineer
