= Friendly People =

Studio album by Guttermouth
- Released: September 13, 1994
- Recorded: February – March 1994
- Genre: Punk rock
- Length: 24:01
- Label: Nitro
- Producer: Guttermouth

Guttermouth chronology
Full Length LP (1991)	Friendly People (1994)	Teri Yakimoto (1996)

Professional ratings
Review scores
Source	Rating
Allmusic	2.5/5 stars
Punknews.org	3.5/5 stars

Friendly People is the second album by the Huntington Beach, California punk rock band Guttermouth, released in 1994 by Nitro Records. It was the first release for the label, which was founded by Dexter Holland of The Offspring. The album continued the band's style of fast, abrasive punk rock with tongue-in-cheek humor and sarcastic lyrics.

The release of Friendly People gained Guttermouth supporting slots on national and world tours with bands such as The Offspring. During these tours the band developed a reputation for chaos and outrageous behavior, resulting in their being banned and blacklisted from several tours and venues. The most famous of these incidents included the band being banned for several years from performing in Canada on charges of public indecency due to onstage nudity in Saskatoon, and singer Mark Adkins' arrest for "assault with a deadly weapon" after using his onstage microphone to incite a near-riot during a show in San Bernardino.

Some early versions of the CD copy of the album contain technical errors. The songs are tracked out of order from their original listing, and the overall speed is slower making the recording sound like a slower mix. These inconsistencies are due to technical errors at the plant where the CDs were produced.

== Track listing ==
All songs written by Guttermouth except where noted

1. "End on 9" 2:07
2. "Derek" 2:08
3. "Jamie's Petting Zoo" 1:26
4. "Bullshit" 0:35
5. "P.C." 2:18
6. "Disneyland" 2:01
7. "Cant We All Just Get Along (At the Dinner Table)" 1:46
8. "Veggicide" 2:09
9. "Chaps My Hide" 1:13
10. "What's Gone Wrong" 1:39
11. "You're Late" 1:15
12. "Summer's Over" 1:47
13. "Asshole" 1:39
- Some early pressings of the CD have an incorrect playing order and a slower speed. On these versions the playing order is as follows:
1. "Disneyland"
2. "Jamie's Petting Zoo"
3. "Bullshit"
4. "Can't We All Just Get Along (At the Dinner Table)"
5. "Veggicide"
6. "Chaps My Hide"
7. "End on 9"
8. "What's Gone Wrong"
9. "P.C."
10. "Summer's Over"
11. "You're Late"
12. "Asshole"
13. "Derek"

== Performers ==
- Mark Adkins - vocals
- Scott Sheldon - guitar
- Eric "Derek" Davis - guitar
- Clint "Cliff" Weinrich - bass
- James Nunn (aka Captain James T. Nunn) - drums
- Joey Hernandez (Voodoo Glow Skulls) - saxophone
- Joe McNally (Voodoo Glow Skulls) - trombone
- D.I., Shawn Stern, Arancha, Steve Kravac, Joe Peccorillo, and Louis Posen - backing vocals

== Album information ==
- Record label: Nitro Records
- Recorded February–April 1994 at Westbeach Recorders
- Engineered by Joe Peccorillo
- Additional engineering and mixing by Steve Kravac
- Mastered by John Golden
- Art direction and packaging by Fred Hidalgo and Guttermouth
