= Dr. Strange Records =

- Founded: 1988
- Status: Active
- Genre: Punk; Rock
- Country of origin: United States
- Location: Alta Loma, California

Dr. Strange Records is a record label and record store located in Alta Loma, California. It started out as an apartment-based distro in 1988 and became a record label in 1989, run out of the "Doc's" apartment until 1997, when the store was first opened.

The company is located in the historic Alta Loma post office, built in 1906, at 7136 Amethyst Street (at the northwest corner of the intersection with Lomita Drive; 34.12441°N 117.59847°W).

The label features many well known punk bands.

== Bands ==
- The Bollweevils
- The BillyBones
- Black Market Baby
- Broken Bones
- Brown Lobster Tank
- Channel 3
- External Menace
- Face to Face
- Field Day
- Flux Of Pink Indians
- The Freeze
- The Frustrators
- Gameface
- Government Issue
- Guttermouth
- Ill Repute
- Jim Threat and the Vultures
- Mad Parade
- Manson Youth
- The Marshes
- Mandingo
- My Favorite Band
- Narcoleptic Youth
- 999
- The Partisans
- Peter and the Test Tube Babies
- Rhythm Colllision
- Riot/Clone
- Schleprock
- Sinkhole
- Skankin' Pickle
- Symbol Six (band)
- The Skulls
- Tank
- Texas Thieves
- The Threats
- The Voids
- Voodoo Glow Skulls
- Whatever
- Mad Parade
- Zoinks!
