= Donnell Cameron =

Donnell Cameron is a record producer known for his work with Sublime, Blink-182, and Avenged Sevenfold. He owned a recording studio, Westbeach Recorders, in Hollywood, California.

== Production ==
In 1991, Cameron produced the debut album for Drive Like Jehu which was a self-titled album. Later he worked on another album of theirs, called Yank Crime, not as a producer but on the engineering side. In 2010, it was announced in the news section of the Blues Venom website that Cameron and Jay Gordon were to be working together on a new album with Cameron and Gordon working on 10 songs, both producing and mixing them to make what Cameron hoped would be the ultimate rock/blues album.
