= Ty Smith (drummer) =

American drummer

Ty Smith (born January 2, 1977, in Alton, Illinois) is an American studio and internationally touring drummer.

== Early life ==
Born January 2, 1977, he grew up in Bethalto, Illinois. Smith taught himself to play the drums at the age of three and continued to study through high school. He studied many styles and techniques from an early age. At the age of 16, he started playing professionally in the local band Ultrafink and opened for such acts as Bloodhound Gang, Nerf Herder, W.A.S.P. and Goldfinger and also was placed in heavy rotation on the St. Louis radio station The Point.

== Career ==
Ultrafink opened for The Vandals in St. Louis in 1997 and Smith was approached by Joe Escalante, bass player of The Vandals, to fill in for their drummer Josh Freese while Freese was on tour with Devo. Smith subsequently toured with The Vandals on the 1997 Warped Tour.

Smith moved to Los Angeles in 1997 to pursue his music career and it was there he joined Jughead's Revenge as their touring and recording drummer. Guttermouth approached Smith a year later and he joined the band in 1998 and remained with them for nine years and five albums. Weary of their on and offstage antics, Smith ultimately called it quits with Guttermouth in 2006.

Smith maintained his relationship with his promising hometown band between touring and recording with Guttermouth. In 1998, Smith convinced the other members of what was to become Bullets and Octane to join him in Los Angeles in hopes of creating and nurturing his own band and music and separating from the reputation of Guttermouth. In 2003 Bullets and Octane received label interest and procured a manager. By 2004, the band was in the studio with Guns N' Roses guitarist Gilby Clarke recording 2004's "The Revelry" on Criterion Records and later re-released on Ares Records. The 2006 follow up "In the Mouth of the Young", on Sony BMG/RCA records was produced by Helmet guitarist Page Hamilton. The band toured with the Family Values Tour in 2006 along with such bands as Dir En Grey, Korn, Flyleaf, Stone Sour, and Deftones, as well as international tours with Avenged Sevenfold, Flogging Molly, and Social Distortion.

The band left RCA in 2007 and released "Song for the Underdog" in June 2007 on Ares Records. Smith quit the band soon after.

Black President, whose members consist of Charlie Paulson of Goldfinger, Greg Hetson of Circle Jerks and Bad Religion, Jason Christopher of Prong and Christian Martucci of the Dee Dee Ramone Band asked Smith to join them as their touring and recording drummer for this project in 2007. Smith toured with Black President in 2008.

Subsequently, Smith also played drums and toured with the industrial alternative rock/metal band Godhead for their 2008 album "At the Edge of the World" until the band went on hiatus in 2009 while singer Jason Miller pursued a solo career.

In May 2010, Smith joined the Todd Youth (Agnostic Front, Murphy's Law, D Generation, Danzig) led band The Chelsea Smiles/Royal Highness with Johnny Martin (Jesse Malin & the St. Marks Social, Dizzy Reed Band, The Cunninghams, Cousin Oliver), RJ Ronquillo (Dizzy Reed Band) and former Bullets and Octane bandmate Skye Vaughan-Jayne (Son of Sam, Beer City Rockers), replacing Karl Rosqvist (Michael Monroe Band).

As of June 2010, Smith has been the internationally touring and recording drummer for New York singer/songwriter Jesse Malin. He has also been performing with singer/songwriter rock artist Willie Nile, rockabilly artist Robert Gordon and toured with Dizzy Reed of Guns N' Roses.
