= Joe Doherty (singer) =

American singer

- Also known as: Joe D
- Born: Joseph Doherty; October 1, 1970 (age 55)
- Genres: Punk rock
- Occupation: punk rock singer
- Instruments: Musician, singer-songwriter
- Years active: 1980s-present
- Website: Jughead's Revenge's Official Web Site

Joe Doherty (born October 1, 1970) is the American lead for Jughead's Revenge, a punk rock band from Los Angeles, California, United States. He was involved in that band until first breakup in 2001, and is part of their 2009 reunion.

== Biography ==
=== Jughead's Revenge ===
After Doherty met guitarist Joe Rimicci and bassist Brian Preiss at a COA band practice, he started Jughead's Revenge in 1989, when he was only 18 1/2 years old. Cited as one of the seminal California punk groups, Jughead's Revenge released six full-length albums and was active until 2001, when they were forced to split up after a lawsuit from Archie Comics, which led the band to change their name to Jugg's Revenge.

It was announced in December 2009 that Doherty would be touring and possibly recording again with Jughead's Revenge. He was present at their first reunion show at the Scotland Yard in Canoga Park, California on March 20, 2010, and the band plans to play more live venues after this.

=== Raised by Wolves ===
Doherty is the co-host of the podcast Raised by Wolves.
