= Nitro Records =

Record label

- Parent company: Concord Music
- Founded: 1994
- Founder: Dexter Holland, Greg K.
- Defunct: 2007
- Distributor: Universal Music Group
- Genre: Punk rock; hardcore punk; post-punk
- Country of origin: U.S.
- Location: Huntington Beach, California
- Official website: www.nitrorecords.com

Nitro Records was an American independent record label, founded in 1994 and operated by The Offspring's Dexter Holland and Greg K. Nitro is famous for being an incubator for punk rock artists who have subsequently become successful, most notably AFI. The label has also released albums from classic punk bands, including The Damned and T.S.O.L.

In July 2013, Bicycle Music acquired Nitro Records.

== Former bands ==
- 30 Foot Fall
- AFI
- The Aquabats
- A Wilhelm Scream
- Bodyjar
- Bullet Train to Vegas
- Crime in Stereo
- The Damned
- Divit
- Don't Look Down
- Enemy You
- Ensign
- Exene Cervenka and the Original Sinners
- Guttermouth
- Hit The Switch
- Jughead's Revenge
- The Letters Organize
- Lost City Angels
- Much The Same
- No Trigger
- The Offspring (re-releasing old material)
- One Hit Wonder
- Rufio
- Sloppy Seconds
- Son of Sam
- TheStart
- Stavesacre
- T.S.O.L.
- The Turbo A.C.'s
- Up Syndrome
- The Vandals

== Compilations ==
- 1996 – Go Ahead Punk... Make My Day
- 1998 – Deep Thoughts
- 2000 – The Thought Remains the Same (re-issue of Deep Thoughts)
- 2001 – Punkzilla
