= List of members of the Offspring =

American punk rock band members

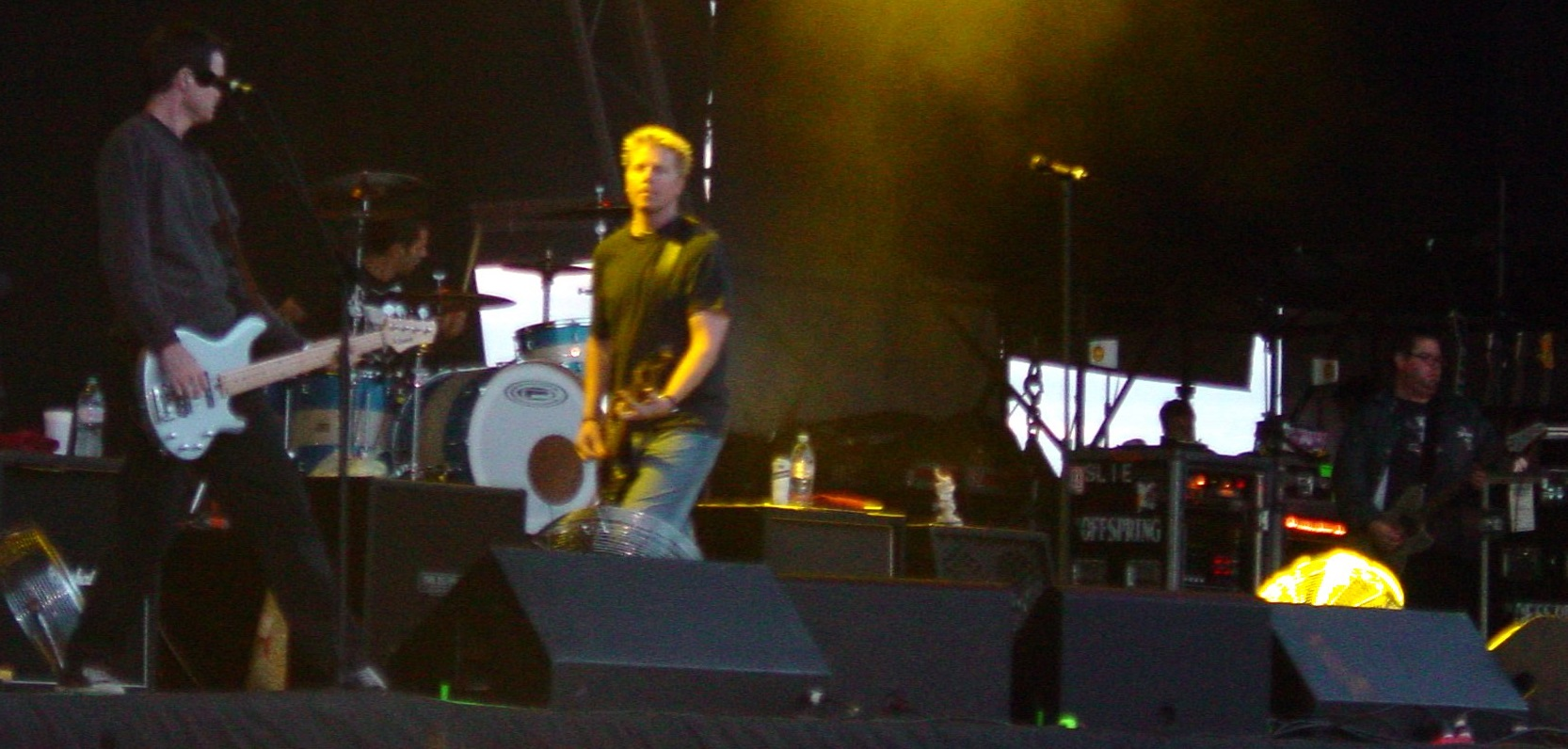
(left to right) Greg K., Atom Willard, Dexter Holland, and Noodles (Chris Higgins not shown)

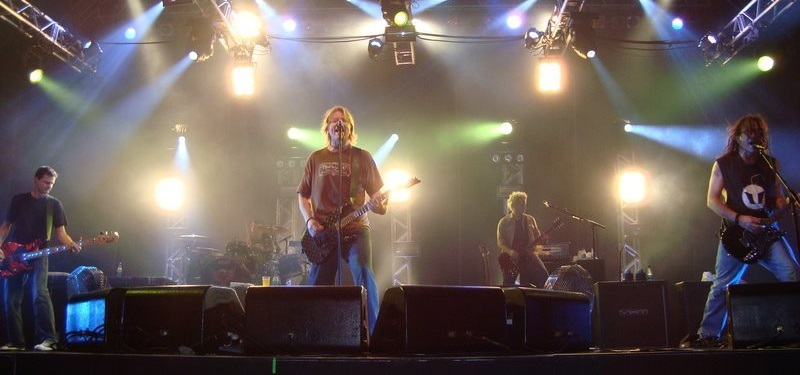
(left to right) Greg K., Pete Parada, Dexter Holland, Andrew Freeman and Noodles.

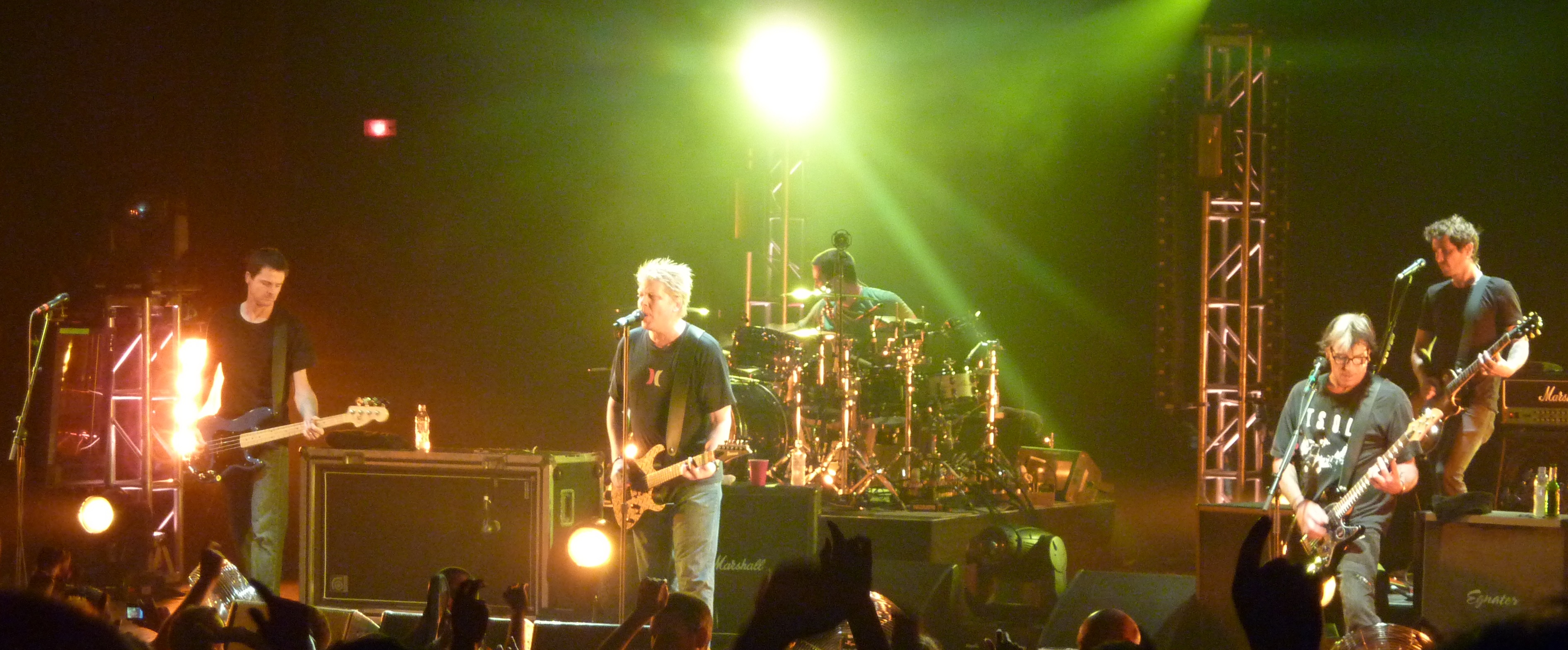
(left to right) Greg K., Dexter Holland, Pete Parada, Noodles and Todd Morse.

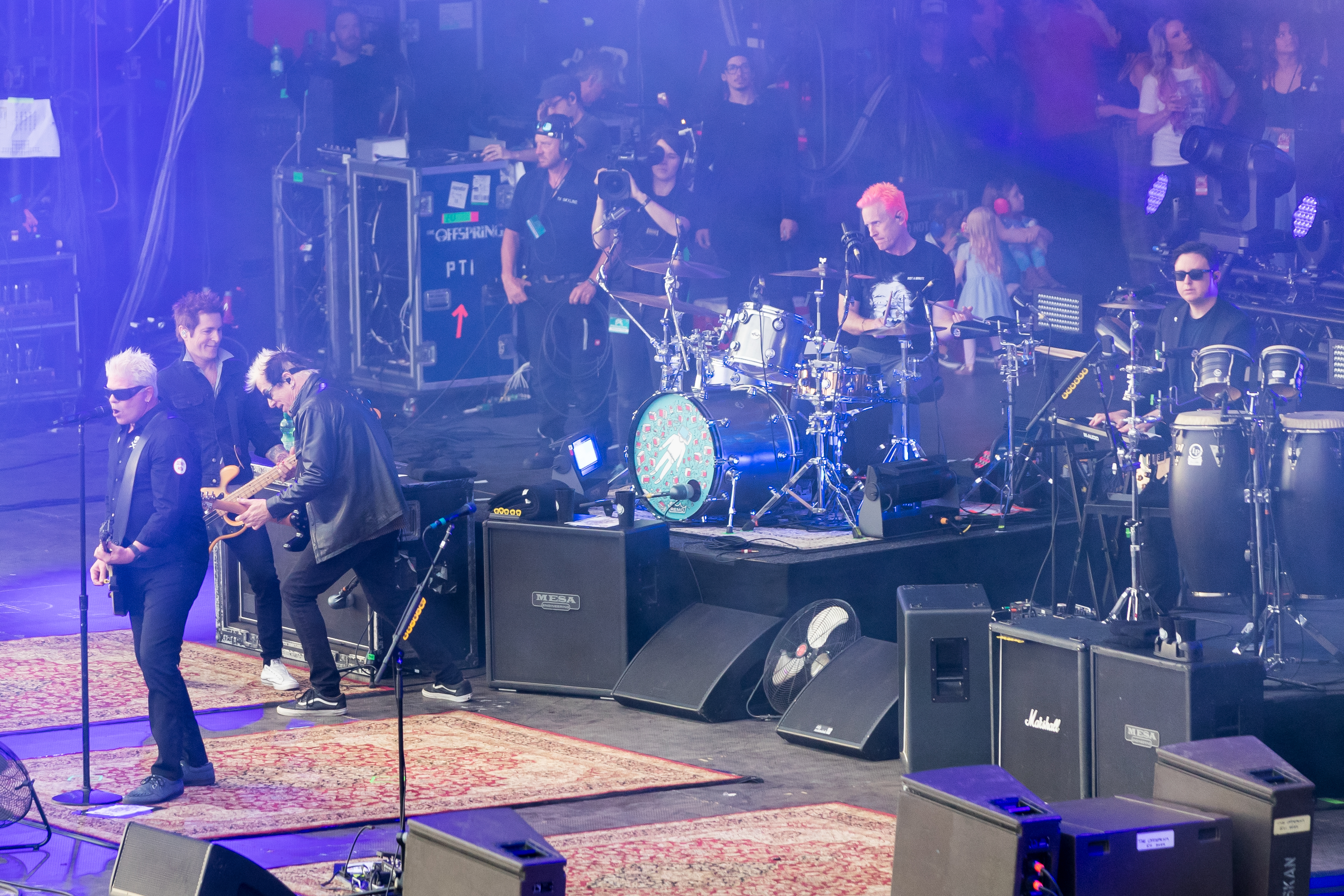
(left to right) Dexter Holland, Todd Morse, Noodles, Josh Freese and Jonah Nimoy

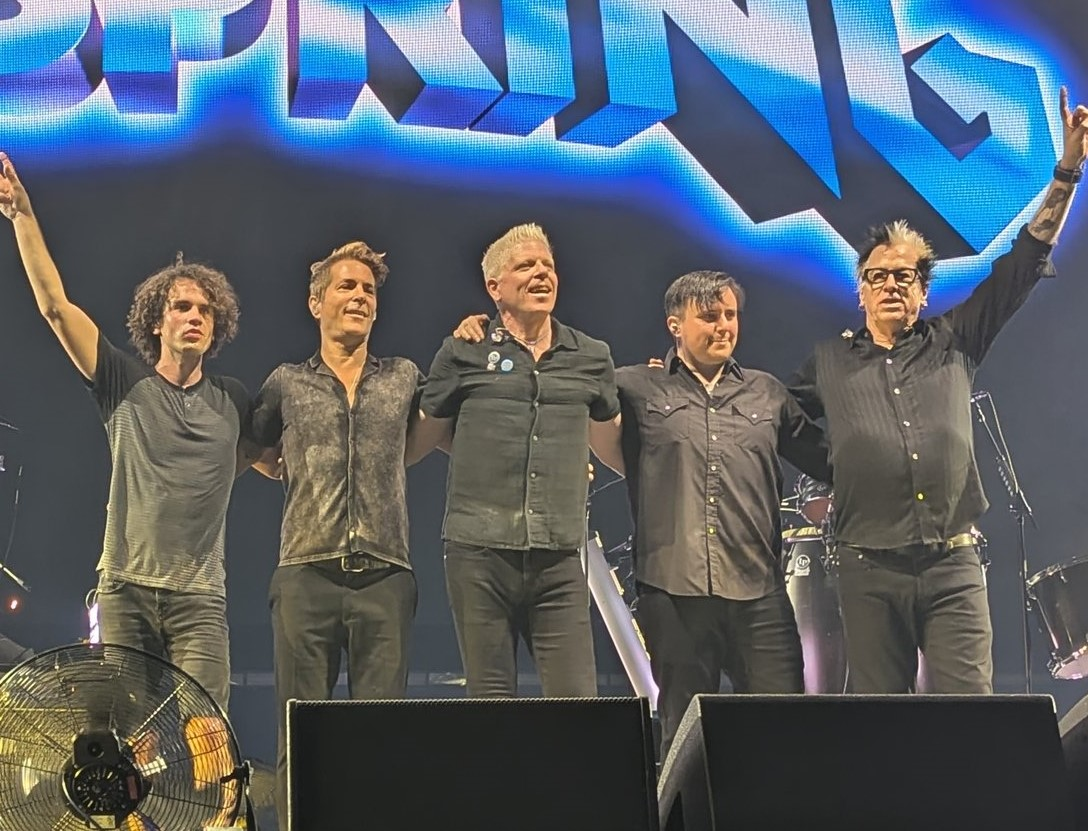
Six line-ups of the Offspring, performing in 2004, 2008, 2009, 2022 and 2025.

The Offspring is an American punk rock band from Garden Grove, California, formed in 1984. Originally formed under the name Manic Subsidal, the group originally included vocalist and guitarist Dexter Holland (real name Bryan Holland), bassist Greg K. (real name Greg Kriesel) and drummer James Lilja. The band's current line-up includes Holland, alongside lead guitarist Noodles (real name Kevin Wasserman; since 1985), bassist Todd Morse (since 2019, and touring rhythm guitars from 2009 to 2019), multi-instrumentalist Jonah Nimoy (since 2023, as touring musician from 2019 to 2023) and drummer Brandon Pertzborn (since 2023).

== History ==
The band changed its name to "the Offspring" in 1986. Lilja left the Offspring in 1987 to pursue a medical career in oncology and was replaced by Ron Welty, who was 16 years old at the time. The band's first touring member was Chris "X-13" Higgins, who at first provided backing vocals and later played percussion and rhythm guitar.

Welty was fired from the group in 2003, a few days before the recording sessions of Splinter started. Josh Freese recorded drums on the album while Atom Willard (real name Adam Willard) joined as Welty's official replacement. The tour to promote Splinter featured Ronnie King on keyboards, after King left Higgins also started playing keyboards.

After a world tour in 2005, the band took a break. During the hiatus, touring member Higgins left, while Willard was recruited by Tom DeLonge for his band, Angels & Airwaves. It was announced on July 27, 2007, that former Saves the Day drummer Pete Parada had been chosen to be the Offspring's new drummer. band's first shows with Parada were at the Summer Sonic festival in Japan in August 2007.

Warren Fitzgerald was hired as the band’s new touring guitarist in 2008 for the European Tour and was replaced in late 2008 by Andrew Freeman. Freeman was replaced by Todd Morse in 2009. Greg K. was fired from the Offspring in 2018 and was initially replaced on tour by No Doubt bassist Tony Kanal before Morse switched to bass and became an official member. Because of Kriesel's departure Dexter Holland remained as the only original member. The touring guitarist spot was taken by Jonah Nimoy, who also later played keyboards and percussion. Nimoy had previously performed with the band as substitute for Morse who covered for Noodles in 2017.

Shortly after releasing its tenth studio album Let the Bad Times Roll (2021), drummer Pete Parada revealed on August 2, 2021, on Twitter that he was fired from the Offspring after electing not to receive the COVID-19 vaccine due to possible complications with his previously diagnosed Guillain–Barré syndrome. Parada got replaced on tour by Josh Freese. On May 12, 2023, former Suicidal Tendencies and Marilyn Manson drummer Brandon Pertzborn joined the Offspring as Parada's official replacement, as Freese was unable to perform with the band because of commitments with the Foo Fighters. After Pertzborn's arrival, touring member Jonah Nimoy also became an official member.

On August 6, 2023, original Offspring drummer James Lilja joined the Offspring on stage for the first time in 36 years to play perform the song "Beheaded" (which he had co-written with Dexter Holland).

== Band members ==
=== Current ===
Image	Name	Years active	Instruments	Release contributions
	Dexter Holland	1984–present	lead vocals; rhythm and lead guitar; keyboards (2006–present); bass (2018–2024)	all releases
	Noodles	1985–present	lead and rhythm guitar; backing vocals	all releases except "Hopeless" (1984)
	Todd Morse	2019–present (touring musician 2009–2019)	bass (2019–present); backing vocals; rhythm guitar (2009–2019; as touring musician); lead guitar (2017 substitute for Noodles on summer tour)	Days Go By (2012); Supercharged (2024)
	Jonah Nimoy	2023–present (touring musician 2019–2023; 2017 substitute for Todd Morse who was covering for Noodles on summer tour)	rhythm guitar; backing vocals; keyboards (2019–present); percussion (2020–present)	Supercharged (2024)
	Brandon Pertzborn	2023–present	drums	Supercharged (2024); "I Wanna Be Sedated" (2026)

=== Former ===
Image	Name	Years active	Instruments	Release contributions
	Greg K.	1984–2018	bass; backing vocals	all releases from "Hopeless" (1984) to "Down" (2018)
	James Lilja	1984–1987 (one-off guest appearance in 2023)	drums; backing vocals	"Hopeless" (1984); "Tonight I Do"/"Call It Religion"/"Halloween" (1985); "I'll Be Waiting"/"Blackball" (1986)
	Ron Welty	1987–2003	drums; backing vocals (1989, 1994)	All releases from The Offspring (1989) to "Defy You" (2001)
	Atom Willard	2003–2007	drums	"Next to You" (2005)
	Pete Parada	2007–2021	drums	Days Go By (2012); Summer Nationals (2014); "Coming For You" (2015); "Sharknado" (2016); "Down" (2018); "Christmas (Baby Please Come Home)"; Let the Bad Times Roll (2021)

== Touring musicians ==
=== Former ===
Image	Name	Years active	Instruments	Release contributions
	Chris "X-13" Higgins	1994–2005	backing vocals; percussion (1997–2005); rhythm guitar (1998–2005); keyboards (2004–2005)	all releases from Americana (1998) to Rise and Fall, Rage and Grace (2008)
	Warren Fitzgerald	2008	rhythm guitar; backing vocals	none
	Andrew Freeman	2008–2009	rhythm guitar; backing vocals	none
	Tony Kanal	2018–2019	bass	none
	Josh Freese	2021–2023 (session 2003–present)	drums	all releases from Splinter (2003) except "Next to You" (2005), "Coming For You" (2015), "Sharknado" (2016), "Down" (2018), "Christmas (Baby Please Come Home)" (2020) and "I Wanna Be Sedated" (2026)

=== Substitutes ===
Image	Name	Years active	Instruments	Notes
	Scott Shiflett	2008	bass; backing vocals	substitute for Greg K. for fourteen shows.
	Tom Thacker	2013; 2017	rhythm guitar; backing vocals	substitute for Todd Morse in 2013 for two shows; 2017 substitute for Morse who was covering for Noodles on summer tour.
	Jamie Miller	2021; 2026	drums	substitute for Josh Freese for seven shows; 2026 substitute for Brandon Pertzborn for seven shows.
	Will Dorsey Jr.	2021; 2022	drums	2021 substitute for Josh Freese for one show; 2022 substitute for Josh Freese for two shows.

== Lineups ==
Period	Members	Releases
Mid 1984 – early 1985 (as Manic Subsidal)	Dexter Holland – lead vocals, guitar; Greg K. – bass, backing vocals; James Lilja – drums, backing vocals	"Hopeless" (1984)
Early 1985 – mid 1986 (as Manic Subsidal)	Dexter Holland – lead vocals, rhythm guitar; Noodles – lead guitar, backing vocals; Greg K. – bass, backing vocals; James Lilja – drums, backing vocals	none
Mid 1986 – early 1987 (as the Offspring)	Dexter Holland – lead vocals, rhythm guitar; Noodles – lead guitar, backing vocals; Greg K. – bass, backing vocals; James Lilja – drums, backing vocals	"Tonight I Do"/"Call It Religion"/"Halloween" (1985); "I'll Be Waiting"/"Blackball" (single version) (1986)
Early 1987 – May 1994	Dexter Holland – lead vocals, rhythm guitar; Noodles – lead guitar, backing vocals; Greg K. – bass, backing vocals; Ron Welty – drums, backing vocals	The Offspring (1989); Baghdad (1991); Ignition (1992); Smash (1994)
May 1994 – January 2003	Dexter Holland – lead vocals, rhythm guitar; Noodles – lead guitar, backing vocals; Greg K. – bass, backing vocals; Ron Welty – drums; Chris Higgins – rhythm guitar, percussion, backing vocals (touring)	"Smash It Up" (1995); Club Me (1997); Ixnay on the Hombre (1997); Americana (1998); Conspiracy of One (2000); "Defy You" (2001)
January – October 2003	Dexter Holland – lead vocals, rhythm guitar; Noodles – lead guitar, backing vocals; Greg K. – bass, backing vocals; Chris Higgins – rhythm guitar, percussion, backing vocals (touring)	Splinter (2003) (Note: The 2003 album Splinter was recorded by the lineup that lasted from January – October 2003 and released when the band had the lineup that lasted from October 2003 – July 2007.)
October 2003 – December 2005	Dexter Holland – lead vocals, rhythm guitar; Noodles – lead guitar, backing vocals; Greg K. – bass, backing vocals; Atom Willard – drums; Chris Higgins – rhythm guitar, keyboards, percussion, backing vocals (touring)	"Can't Repeat" (2005) (Note: Josh Freese played drums on "Can't Repeat" instead of Atom Willard.); "Next to You" (2005)
December 2005 – July 2007	Dexter Holland – lead vocals, rhythm guitar, keyboards; Noodles – lead guitar, backing vocals; Greg K. – bass, backing vocals; Atom Willard – drums	none
July 2007 – June 2008	Dexter Holland – lead vocals, rhythm guitar, keyboards; Noodles – lead guitar, backing vocals; Greg K. – bass, backing vocals; Pete Parada – drums	Rise and Fall, Rage and Grace (2008) (Note: The 2008 album Rise and Fall, Rage and Grace was recorded by the lineup that lasted from January – October 2003 and released when the band had the lineups that lasted from July 2007 – November 2018.)
June – July 2008	Dexter Holland – lead vocals, rhythm guitar, keyboards; Noodles – lead guitar, backing vocals; Greg K. – bass, backing vocals; Pete Parada – drums; Warren Fitzgerald – rhythm guitar, backing vocals (touring)	Rise and Fall, Rage and Grace (2008)
July 2008 – May 2009	Dexter Holland – lead vocals, rhythm guitar, keyboards; Noodles – lead guitar, backing vocals; Greg K. – bass, backing vocals; Pete Parada – drums; Andrew Freeman – rhythm guitar, backing vocals (touring)	Rise and Fall, Rage and Grace (2008)
May 2009 – November 2018	Dexter Holland – lead vocals, guitar, keyboards; Noodles – lead guitar, backing vocals; Greg K. – bass, backing vocals; Pete Parada – drums; Todd Morse – rhythm guitar, backing (touring)	Days Go By (2012); Summer Nationals (2014); "Coming for You" (single version) (2015); "Sharknado" (2016); "Down" (2018)
November 2018 – January 2019	Dexter Holland – lead vocals, guitar, keyboards, bass; Noodles – lead guitar, backing vocals; Pete Parada – drums; Todd Morse – rhythm guitar, backing vocals (touring); Tony Kanal – bass (touring)	"Christmas (Baby Please Come Home)" (2020) (Note: The 2020 single Christmas (Baby Please Come Home) was recorded by the lineup that lasted from November 2018 – January 2019 and released during the time the band had the lineup that lasted from January 2019 – August 2021.); Let the Bad Times Roll (2021) (Note: The 2021 album Let the Bad Times Roll was recorded by the lineup that lasted from November 2018 – January 2019 and released during the time the band had the lineup that lasted from January 2019 – August 2021.)
January 2019 – August 2021	Dexter Holland – lead vocals, guitar, keyboards, bass; Noodles – lead guitar, backing vocals; Todd Morse – bass, backing vocals; Pete Parada – drums; Jonah Nimoy – rhythm guitar, keyboards, percussion, backing vocals (touring)	"Christmas (Baby Please Come Home)" (2020); Let the Bad Times Roll (2021)
August 2021 – May 2023	Dexter Holland – lead vocals, guitar, keyboards, bass; Noodles – lead guitar, backing vocals; Todd Morse – bass, backing vocals; Jonah Nimoy – rhythm guitar, keyboards, percussion, backing vocals (touring); Josh Freese – drums (touring)	"Bell Will Be Ringing (Please Come Home For Christmas)" (2022) (Note: Dexter Holland played bass on "Bell Will Be Ringing (Please Come Home For Christmas)" instead of Todd Morse.)
May 2023 – October 2026	Dexter Holland – lead vocals, guitar, keyboards, bass; Noodles – lead guitar, backing vocals; Todd Morse – bass, backing vocals; Jonah Nimoy – rhythm guitar, keyboards, percussion, backing vocals; Brandon Pertzborn – drums	Supercharged (2024); "I Wanna Be Sedated" (2026) (Note: Dexter Holland played bass on "I Wanna Be Sedated" instead of Todd Morse. Jonah Nimoy does not appear on the track either.)
October 2026 – present	Dexter Holland – lead vocals, guitar, keyboards, bass; Todd Morse – bass, backing vocals; Jonah Nimoy – guitar, keyboards, percussion, backing vocals; Brandon Pertzborn – drums; Noodles – lead guitar, backing vocals (Not touring)	No to date
