= The Offspring discography =

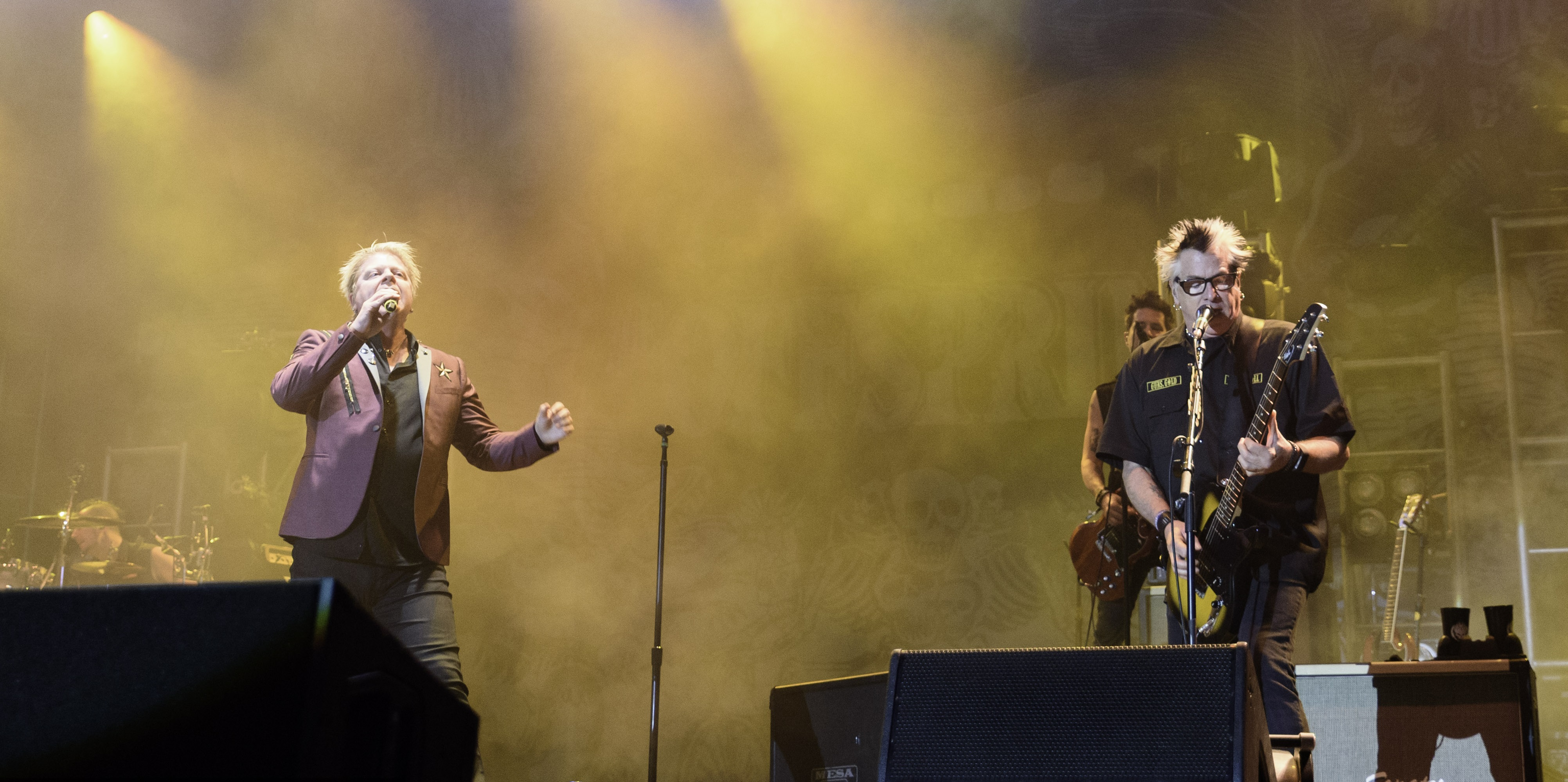
- The Offspring performing in 2016
- Studio albums: 11
- Extended plays: 5
- Soundtrack albums: 9
- Compilation albums: 6
- Singles: 38
- Video albums: 3
- Music videos: 27
- Demos: 5
- Other appearances: 1
- Non-album songs: 12
- Cover tracks: 29

The Offspring, a Southern California-based punk rock band, has released 11 studio albums, three extended plays (EP), six compilation albums, five demos, three video albums, and over 30 singles.

The Offspring were formed in 1984 under the name Manic Subsidal by singer/guitarist Dexter Holland and bassist Greg K., who later recruited Noodles as their guitarist. After Manic Subsidal changed its name to The Offspring in 1986, drummer Ron Welty finally joined in 1987, then the band recorded a demo a year later. The Offspring signed a record deal with short-lived label Nemesis Records, and released its first album, The Offspring, in 1989 on vinyl only. That album would not be released on CD until 1995. Two years later, after the release of the Baghdad EP and another demo, the band signed to Epitaph Records (a label owned by Brett Gurewitz), who released the band's second album, Ignition, in 1992.

In April 1994, The Offspring released Smash. At the time, Ignition had sold only 15,000 copies. Smash was a critically acclaimed album, also the band's most successful yet. Debuting at number four on the Billboard 200, Smash produced three hit singles: "Come Out and Play", "Self Esteem" and "Gotta Get Away". The album was certified 6 times platinum and sold over eleven million worldwide. With sales continuing 32 years after its release, Smash has become Epitaph's best-selling album of all time and the highest-selling independent album of all time. "Come Out and Play" was the band's breakthrough single, topping the US Modern Rock Tracks chart, and it became the band's biggest hit from the album in the US, while "Self Esteem" was the biggest hit from the album outside of the US.

After the release of Smash, The Offspring left Epitaph and signed a record deal with Columbia Records. The year 1997 saw the release of The Offspring's major-label debut, Ixnay on the Hombre. Although not as successful as Smash, Ixnay sold over three million copies. In the following year, the band released its next album, Americana, which debuted at number two of the U.S. charts, and produced three of the band's biggest hits: "Pretty Fly (for a White Guy)", "Why Don't You Get a Job?" and "The Kids Aren't Alright" making the album the peak of The Offspring's mainstream popularity.

In 2000, the band released its sixth album, Conspiracy of One. They intended to release the entire album online through the band's official website, to show support for downloading music on the Internet. However, under threat of legal action by Columbia through its parent company, Sony, only the first single, "Original Prankster", was released on the website (the rest of the record was leaked to fan sites).

While working on a followup to Conspiracy of One, longtime drummer Ron Welty left the band in early 2003 to concentrate on his new project Steady Ground. Soon after, the band released its next album, Splinter, which spawned the band's second number one on Alternative Songs. Uncomfortable with the idea of finding an immediate replacement for Welty, The Offspring opted to have session musician Josh Freese record the drums for Splinter, and later announced that Atom Willard would be the official replacement for Ron Welty. The album's original title was to be Chinese Democrazy, a name used to mock the name of the long-delayed album by Guns N' Roses. As a result, Axl Rose filed a cease and desist order against The Offspring. However, the order was dropped when it was realized that the announcement of the album's name came on April 1 (April Fools' Day).

The year 2005 saw the release of the band's first compilation album, Greatest Hits. It contains 13 of the band's hits between Smash and Splinter and two previously unreleased songs: lead single "Can't Repeat" and a hidden track, "Next to You" (originally by the Police). The compilation does not contain any material from the first album or Ignition. In support of the Greatest Hits album, the band played the Vans Warped Tour for the first time, and a tour in Europe and Japan followed.

After the Greatest Hits tour, The Offspring took an extended hiatus and Willard left the band in July 2007 to concentrate on his current project Angels & Airwaves. He was replaced by former Face to Face drummer Pete Parada. The band's eighth studio album, Rise and Fall, Rage and Grace, was released on June 17, 2008, but Parada did not record it due to contract issues. The band tapped Freese again to record the drum tracks. Second single "You're Gonna Go Far, Kid" went Gold in the US and became their third number one on Billboard Alternative Songs. The next album, Days Go By, was released four years later; this time, the drum tracks were handled by both Freese and Parada, making this his first recording with the band. After touring and playing festivals in support of the album and twenty years of Smash, single "Coming for You" was released in 2015 and became the band's second Billboard Mainstream Rock number one. The single would later appear on the band's tenth studio album, Let the Bad Times Roll, which was released nine years after Days Go By. The drum tracks were once again handled by both Freese and Parada, while Holland took bass duties after Greg K. was fired from the group in 2018. Let the Bad Times Roll would be the last album with Parada, who parted ways with the band in August 2021 for refusing to get a COVID-19 vaccination, due to suffering from Guillain–Barré syndrome. Parada was replaced on tour by Freese and was officially replaced in 2023 by Brandon Pertzborn. The band's eleventh studio album, Supercharged was released on October 11, 2024. The drum tracks were handled by both Freese and Pertzborn, while Holland and new bassist Todd Morse took bass duties.

As of 2015, The Offspring has sold over 40 million albums worldwide. According to Nielsen SoundScan, they have sold almost 17 million albums in the United States and 4.2 million tracks, of which 15 million are certified by the Recording Industry Association of America (RIAA).

== Albums ==
=== Studio albums ===
List of studio albums, with selected chart positions, sales figures and certifications
Title	Album details	Peak chart positions										Sales	Certifications
Title	Album details	US	AUS	AUT	CAN	GER	NLD	NZ	SWE	SWI	UK	Sales	Certifications
The Offspring	Released: June 15, 1989; Label: Nemesis; Formats: CD, LP, cassette, digital download	—	84	—	—	—	85	—	—	—	20	US: 500,000 (Note: Sales as of August 2015)	
Ignition	Released: September 25, 1992; Label: Epitaph; Formats: CD, LP, cassette, digital download	—	—	—	—	—	—	—	—	—	—	US: 1,105,000 (Note: Sales as of August 2015)	RIAA: Gold; ARIA: Gold; BPI: Gold; MC: Platinum
Smash	Released: April 8, 1994; Label: Epitaph; Formats: CD, LP, cassette, digital download	4	1	2	3	4	5	6	3	3	21	US: 6,700,000 (Note: Sales as of May 2012)	RIAA: 6× Platinum; ARIA: 4× Platinum; BPI: Platinum; IFPI AUT: Gold; IFPI SWE: Platinum; IFPI SWI: Platinum; MC: 6× Platinum; RMNZ: Platinum
Ixnay on the Hombre	Released: February 4, 1997; Label: Columbia, Epitaph (Europe); Formats: CD, LP, cassette, digital download	9	2	3	3	15	8	2	4	10	9	US: 1,800,000 (Note: Sales as of August 2015)	RIAA: Platinum; ARIA: 2× Platinum; BPI: Platinum; IFPI SWE: Gold; MC: 2× Platinum; RMNZ: Gold
Americana	Released: November 17, 1998; Label: Columbia; Formats: CD, LP, cassette, digital download	2	1	1	3	5	6	1	1	5	10	US: 5,750,000 (Note: Sales as of August 2015)	RIAA: 5× Platinum; ARIA: 5× Platinum; BPI: Platinum; BVMI: Gold; IFPI AUT: Platinum; IFPI SWE: 2× Platinum; IFPI SWI: Platinum; MC: Diamond; NVPI: Gold; RMNZ: 4× Platinum
Conspiracy of One	Released: November 14, 2000; Label: Columbia; Formats: CD, LP, cassette, digital download	9	4	5	4	8	32	11	8	4	12	US: 1,700,000 (Note: Sales as of August 2015)	RIAA: Platinum; ARIA: 2× Platinum; BPI: Platinum; BVMI: Gold; IFPI AUT: Gold; IFPI SWE: Gold; IFPI SWI: Platinum; MC: 2× Platinum; RMNZ: Platinum
Splinter	Released: December 9, 2003; Label: Columbia; Formats: CD, LP, cassette, digital download	30	12	10	26	31	98	27	56	13	27	US: 1,000,000 (Note: Sales as of August 2015)	RIAA: Gold; ARIA: Platinum; BPI: Gold; IFPI SWI: Gold
Rise and Fall, Rage and Grace	Released: June 17, 2008; Label: Columbia; Formats: CD, LP, digital download	10	3	7	4	13	73	9	52	5	39	US: 600,000 (Note: Sales as of August 2015)	RIAA: Gold; ARIA: Gold; BPI: Silver; MC: Platinum; RMNZ: Platinum
Days Go By	Released: June 26, 2012; Label: Columbia; Formats: CD, digital download	12	7	6	4	5	56	17	57	8	43	US: 240,000 (Note: Sales as of August 2015)	
Let the Bad Times Roll	Released: April 16, 2021; Label: Concord; Formats: CD, LP, digital download, streaming, cassette	27	2	1	16	5	38	1	7	4	3		
Supercharged	Released: October 11, 2024; Label: Concord; Formats: CD, LP, digital download, streaming, cassette	— (Note: Supercharged did not enter the US Billboard 200, but did peak at number 11 on the Billboard Top Album Sales chart.)	4	3	—	6	—	—	—	5	44		
"—" denotes a recording that did not chart or was not released in that territory.

=== Live albums ===
List of live albums, with selected chart positions, sales figures and certifications
Title	Album details	Peak chart positions										Sales	Certifications
Title	Album details	US	AUS	AUT	CAN	GER	NLD	NZ	SWE	SWI	UK	Sales	Certifications
Just The Punk Stuff (Live at The Stone Pony 2026)	Released: January 29, 2027; Label: Concord Records; Formats: CD, LP, cassette, digital download	—	—	—	—	—	—	—	—	—	—		
"—" denotes a recording that did not chart or was not released in that territory.

=== Compilation albums ===
List of compilation albums, with selected chart positions, sales figures and certifications
Title	Album details	Peak chart positions										Certifications
Title	Album details	US	AUS	AUT	CAN	FIN	GER	JPN	NZL	SWI	UK	Certifications
Greatest Hits	Released: June 20, 2005; Label: Columbia; Formats: CD, LP, DD, DualDisc	8	2	6	6	1	23	6	1	5	14	RIAA: Platinum; ARIA: 3× Platinum; BPI: Gold; BVMI: Gold; IFPI SWI: Gold; MC: Platinum; RIAJ: Platinum; RMNZ: Platinum
Happy Hour!	Released: August 4, 2010; Label: Sony Japan; Formats: CD, digital download, streaming	—	—	—	—	—	—	45	—	—	—	
Puck Punks: The Offspring Powerplay Hits	Released: February 9, 2024; Label: Round Hill; Formats: LP	—	—	—	—	—	—	—	—	—	—	
Supercharged: Worldwide in '25	Released: December 13, 2024; Label: UMG; Formats: digital download, streaming	—	—	—	—	—	—	—	—	—	—	
Anti-Valentine's Day with The Offspring	Released: February 6, 2025; Label: UMG; Formats: digital download, streaming	—	—	—	—	—	—	—	—	—	—	
Running & Cycling with The Offspring	Released: August 22, 2025; Label: UMG; Formats: digital download, streaming	—	—	—	—	—	—	—	—	—	—	
Just the Punk Stuff	Released: June 26, 2026; Label: UMG; Formats: digital download, streaming	—	—	—	—	—	—	—	—	—	—	
"—" denotes a release that did not chart.

=== Demo albums ===
Year	Demo details	Track listing
1984/1985	First Manic Subsidal Demo: Released: 1983/1985; Label: Not on label; Format: Cassette	Included "Hopeless" and snippets from Garage Days (Americana video)
1986	5 Songs: Released: 1986; Label: Not on label; Format: Cassette	1. "Ballroom Blitz" (Sweet parody) - 2:10; 2. "Fire and Ice" ("I'll Be Waiting") - 3:32; 3. "Halloween" - 3:08; 4. "Prophecy" ("Demons") - 3:19; 5. "Call It Religion" - 2:01
1986	6 Songs: Released: July 1986; Label: Not on label; Format: Cassette	A-side: 1. "Blackball" – 3:24; 2. "Tonight I Do" – 2:19; 3. "Call It Religion" – 2:01; B-side: 4. "Ballroom Blitz" (Sweet parody) – 2:10; 5. "Halloween" – 3:06; 6. "Fire and Ice" ("I'll Be Waiting") – 3:35
1988	Tehran: Released: 1988; Label: Not on label; Format: Cassette	A-side: 1. "Tehran" – 3:12; 2. "Crossroads" – 2:28; B-side: 3. "Jennifer Lost the War" – 2:44; 4. "Out on Patrol" – 2:45
1991	(No Title): Released: 1991; Label: Not on label; Format: Cassette	1. "Session"; 2. ????; 3. ????; 4. ????
1993	Smash Demo Tape: Released: 1993; Label: Not on label; Format: Cassette	A-side: 1. "In Colorado" ("Nitro (Youth Energy)"); 2. "Genocide"; 3. "Man on a Wheel" ("Smash"); 4. "It'll Be a Long Time"; 5. "Really, Really Punk" ("So Alone"); 6. "Something to Believe In"; 7. "Killboy" ("Killboy Powerhead"); 8. "Bad Habit"; B-side: 1. "Cogs" ("Gotta Get Away"); 2. "I'm Not the One" ("Not the One"); 3. "Old Slow One" ("Self Esteem")

=== Other appearances ===
Year	Details	Tracks
1996	Go Ahead Punk... Make My Day: Released: September 24, 1996; Label: Nitro; Formats: CD	"Hey Joe" (Billy Roberts cover); "Beheaded"

== EPs ==
Year	EP details
1991	Baghdad: Released: August 1991; Label: Nemesis; Formats: 7" vinyl
1997	Club Me: Released: January 1, 1997; Label: Epic; Formats: CD
2014	Summer Nationals: Released: August 11, 2014; Label: Time Bomb; Formats: CD
2026	Americana: Released: July 11, 2026; Label: Concord; Formats: Vinyl

== Singles ==
Year	Title	Peak chart positions										Certifications	Album
Year	Title	US	US Alt.	US Main.	AUS	CAN	GER	NLD	NZ	SWE	UK	Certifications	Album
1986	"I'll Be Waiting"	—	—	—	—	—	—	—	—	—	—		The Offspring
1994	"Come Out and Play"	— (Note: "Come Out and Play" was not released commercially as singles in the U.S., and therefore, did not chart on the Billboard Hot 100 chart (Before December 5, 1998, songs were not eligible to enter the Hot 100 unless they were commercially available as a single), but peaked at 38 on the Hot 100 Airplay chart.)	1	10	8	43	—	32	—	23	98	RIAA: Platinum; ARIA: Platinum; RMNZ: Platinum	Smash
1994	"Self Esteem"	— (Note: "Self Esteem" was not released commercially as singles in the U.S., and therefore, did not chart on the Billboard Hot 100 chart (Before December 5, 1998, songs were not eligible to enter the Hot 100 unless they were commercially available as a single), but peaked at 45 on the Hot 100 Airplay chart.)	4	7	6	34	3	4	39	1	37	RIAA: Platinum; ARIA: Gold; BPI: Gold; IFPI SWE: Gold; RMNZ: 2× Platinum	Smash
1995	"Gotta Get Away"	— (Note: "Gotta Get Away" was not released commercially as singles in the U.S., and therefore, did not chart on the Billboard Hot 100 chart (Before December 5, 1998, songs were not eligible to enter the Hot 100 unless they were commercially available as a single), but peaked at 58 on the Hot 100 Airplay chart.)	6	15	53	32	6	33	—	26	43	RIAA: Gold	Smash
1995	"Smash It Up"	— (Note: "Smash It Up" was not released commercially as singles in the U.S., and therefore, did not chart on the Billboard Hot 100 chart (Before December 5, 1998, songs were not eligible to enter the Hot 100 unless they were commercially available as a single), but peaked at 47 on the Hot 100 Airplay chart.)	16	—	—	—	—	—	—	—	—		Batman Forever Soundtrack
1997	"All I Want"	— (Note: "All I Want" was not released commercially as singles in the U.S., and therefore, did not chart on the Billboard Hot 100 chart (Before December 5, 1998, songs were not eligible to enter the Hot 100 unless they were commercially available as a single), but peaked at 65 on the Hot 100 Airplay chart.)	13	18	15	—	6	51	27	36	31		Ixnay on the Hombre
1997	"Gone Away"	— (Note: "Gone Away" was not released commercially as singles in the U.S., and therefore, did not chart on the Billboard Hot 100 chart (Before December 5, 1998, songs were not eligible to enter the Hot 100 unless they were commercially available as a single), but peaked at 50 on the Hot 100 Airplay chart.)	4	1	16	28	—	93	35	—	42	RIAA: Platinum; ARIA: Gold; RMNZ: Platinum	Ixnay on the Hombre
1997	"The Meaning of Life"	—	—	—	90	—	—	—	—	—	—		Ixnay on the Hombre
1997	"I Choose"	—	24	5	79	66	—	—	—	—	—		Ixnay on the Hombre
1998	"Pretty Fly (for a White Guy)"	53	3	5	1	5	2	1	—	1	1	RIAA: Platinum; ARIA: 4× Platinum; BPI: 2× Platinum; BVMI: Gold; IFPI SWE: 3× Platinum; NVPI: Gold; RMNZ: 2× Platinum	Americana
1999	"Why Don't You Get a Job?"	74	4	10	2	19	16	6	4	2	2	RIAA: Platinum; ARIA: 2× Platinum; BPI: Gold; IFPI SWE: Gold; RMNZ: Platinum	Americana
1999	"The Kids Aren't Alright"	— (Note: "The Kids Aren't Alright" did not chart on the Billboard Hot 100 chart but peaked on the Bubbling Under Hot 100 Singles chart at number 5.)	6	11	69	— (Note: "The Kids Aren't Alright" did not enter the Canadian Hot 100, but peaked at number 39 on the Canadian Digital Song Sales chart.)	45	29	39	16	11	RIAA: 3× Platinum; BPI: Platinum; BVMI: Platinum; RMNZ: 2× Platinum	Americana
1999	"She's Got Issues"	—	11	19	—	—	—	89	—	59	41		Americana
2000	"Original Prankster"	70	2	7	5	5	46	44	34	5	6	ARIA: Platinum; BPI: Silver	Conspiracy of One
2000	"Want You Bad"	—	10	23	35	—	—	—	—	46	15	RIAA: Gold; BPI: Gold; RMNZ: Gold	Conspiracy of One
2001	"Million Miles Away"	—	—	—	69	—	—	—	—	—	21	BPI: Silver	Conspiracy of One
2001	"Defy You"	77	8	8	54	—	62	—	—	—	—		Orange County Soundtrack
2003	"Hit That"	64	1	6	13	—	31	60	24	—	11	ARIA: Gold; BPI: Silver	Splinter
2004	"(Can't Get My) Head Around You"	— (Note: "(Can't Get My) Head Around You" did not chart on the Billboard Hot 100 chart but peaked on the Bubbling Under Hot 100 Singles chart at number 20.)	6	16	53	—	—	—	—	—	48		Splinter
2004	"Spare Me the Details"	—	—	—	—	—	—	—	31	—	—	RMNZ: Gold	Splinter
2005	"Can't Repeat"	— (Note: "Can't Repeat" did not chart on the Billboard Hot 100 chart but peaked on the Bubbling Under Hot 100 Singles chart at number 10.)	9	10	—	—	—	— (Note: "Can't Repeat" did not enter the Netherlands' Single Top 100 but peaked on the Netherlands' Single Tip Chart at number 22.)	—	—	—		Greatest Hits
2005	"Next to You"	—	37	29	—	—	—	—	—	—	—		Greatest Hits
2008	"Hammerhead"	— (Note: "Hammerhead" did not chart on the Billboard Hot 100 chart but peaked on the Bubbling Under Hot 100 Singles chart at number 5.)	2	8	91	53	—	—	—	—	—	MC: Gold	Rise and Fall, Rage and Grace
2008	"You're Gonna Go Far, Kid"	63	1	10	54	25	67	—	28	—	—	RIAA: 4× Platinum; BPI: Platinum; BVMI: Gold; RMNZ: 2× Platinum	Rise and Fall, Rage and Grace
2008	"Kristy, Are You Doing Okay?"	— (Note: "Kristy, Are You Doing Okay?" did not chart on the Billboard Hot 100 chart but peaked on the Bubbling Under Hot 100 Singles chart at number 6.)	7	38	—	— (Note: "Kristy, Are You Doing Okay?" did not enter the Canadian Hot 100, but peaked at number 24 on the Canada Rock chart.)	—	—	—	—	—		Rise and Fall, Rage and Grace
2009	"Half-Truism"	—	21	30	—	— (Note: "Half-Truism" did not enter the Canadian Hot 100, but peaked at number 34 on the Canada Rock chart.)	—	—	—	—	—		Rise and Fall, Rage and Grace
2012	"Days Go By"	— (Note: "Days Go By" did not chart on the Billboard Hot 100 chart but peaked on the Bubbling Under Hot 100 Singles chart at number 17.)	7	2	—	88	—	—	—	—	—		Days Go By
2012	"Cruising California (Bumpin' in My Trunk)"	—	—	—	70	—	—	—	—	—	—		Days Go By
2012	"Turning into You"	—	39	24	—	— (Note: "Turning Into You" did not enter the Canadian Hot 100, but peaked at number 34 on the Canada Rock chart.)	—	—	—	—	—		Days Go By
2015	"Coming for You"	—	16	1	—	— (Note: "Coming For You" did not enter the Canadian Hot 100, but peaked at number 2 on the Canada Rock chart.)	—	—	—	—	—		Let the Bad Times Roll
2018	"Down"	—	—	—	—	—	—	—	—	—	—		Non-album singles
2020	"Christmas (Baby Please Come Home)"	—	—	—	—	—	—	—	—	—	—		Non-album singles
2021	"Let the Bad Times Roll"	—	10	1	—	— (Note: "Let the Bad Times Roll" did not enter the Canadian Hot 100, but peaked at number 1 on the Canada Rock chart.)	—	—	—	—	—		Let the Bad Times Roll
2021	"We Never Have Sex Anymore"	—	—	—	—	—	—	—	—	—	—		Let the Bad Times Roll
2021	"Gone Away"	—	—	—	—	—	—	—	—	—	—		Let the Bad Times Roll
2022	"Behind Your Walls"	—	19	17	—	— (Note: "Behind Your Walls" did not enter the Canadian Hot 100, but peaked at number 41 on the Canada Rock chart.)	—	—	—	—	—		Let the Bad Times Roll
2022	"Bells Will Be Ringing (Please Come Home for Christmas)"	—	—	—	—	—	—	—	—	—	—		Non-album single
2024	"Make It All Right"	—	2	2	—	— (Note: "Make It All Right" did not enter the Canadian Hot 100, but peaked at number 9 on the Canada Rock chart.)	— (Note: "Make It All Right" did not enter the German Singles Chart, but peaked at number 39 on the Germany Airplay Chart.)	—	—	—	—		Supercharged
2024	"Light It Up"	—	—	—	—	—	— (Note: "Light It Up" did not enter the German Singles Chart, but peaked at number 64 on the Germany Airplay Chart.)	—	—	—	—		Supercharged
2024	"Come to Brazil"	—	—	—	—	—	— (Note: "Come to Brazil" did not enter the German Singles Chart, but peaked at number 7 on the Germany Alt. Singles Chart.)	—	—	—	—		Supercharged
2024	"OK, But This Is the Last Time"	—	2	25	—	— (Note: "OK, But This Is the Last Time" did not enter the Canadian Hot 100, but peaked at number 11 on the Canada Rock chart.)	— (Note: "OK, But This Is the Last Time" did not enter the German Singles Chart, but peaked at number 69 on the Germany Airplay Chart.)	—	—	—	—		Supercharged
2025	"Looking Out for #1"	—	40	—	—	—	—	—	—	—	—		Supercharged
2026	"Let the Good Times Roll" (featuring Electric Callboy)	—	—	21	—	—	— (Note: "Let the Good Times Roll" did not enter the German Singles Chart, but peaked at number 1 on the Germany Alt. Singles Chart.)	—	—	—	—		Tanzneid (Electric Callboy album)
2026	"Pretty Fly (for a White Guy)" (8onthebeat Mix)	—	—	—	—	—	—	—	—	—	—		Non-album single
2026	"I Wanna Be Sedated" (Ramones Cover)	—	—	—	—	—	—	—	—	—	—		Non-album single
2026	"Coming For You" (Hometown Remix)	—	—	—	—	—	—	—	—	—	—		Non-album single
2026	"Oi To The World!" (The Vandals Cover)	—	—	—	—	—	—	—	—	—	—		Non-album single
2026	"Jennifer Lost the War"	—	—	—	—	—	—	—	—	—	—		Just The Punk Stuff!! (Live at The Stone Pony 2026)
"—" denotes a release that did not chart.

== Soundtrack contributions ==
Year	Song	Film
1995	"Smash It Up" (The Damned cover)	Batman Forever
1997	"D.U.I."	I Know What You Did Last Summer
1998	"The Kids Aren't Alright"	The Faculty
1998	"The Meaning of Life"	Tekken: The Motion Picture
1999	"Beheaded (1999)" (Note: "Beheaded" was originally recorded for their 1989 self-titled album, and re-recorded for the Idle Hands soundtrack in 1999.)	Idle Hands
1999	"I Wanna Be Sedated" (Ramones cover)	Idle Hands
2000	"Bloodstains" (Agent Orange cover)	Ready to Rumble
2000	"Totalimmortal" (AFI cover)	Me, Myself & Irene
2002	"Defy You"	Orange County
2006	"Come Out and Play (Keep 'Em Separated)"	Click
2016	"Sharknado"	Sharknado: The 4th Awakens

== Non-album songs ==
Year	Song	Released on
1984	"Sorority Bitch" (as Manic Subsidal)	Unreleased
1984	"Hopeless" (as Manic Subsidal)	We Got Power II - Party Animal compilation
1986	"Tonight I Do"	The 6 Songs demo
1986	"Call It Religion"	The 6 Songs demo and the Subject to Blackout compilation
1986	"Halloween"	The 6 Songs demo and the Subject to Blackout compilation
1991	"Baghdad"	The Baghdad EP
1991	"The Blurb"	The Baghdad EP
1997	"D.U.I."	The Club Me EP, the "Gone Away" single, the I Know What You Did Last Summer soundtrack, The Thought Remains the Same compilation, and the Happy Hour! compilation
1999	"Beheaded" (1999 version)	The "Why Don't You Get a Job?" single and the Idle Hands soundtrack
1999	"Hand Grenades"	The Short Music for Short People compilation
2001	"Defy You"	The Orange County soundtrack and the Greatest Hits compilation
2005	"Mission from God"	The Punk-O-Rama 10 compilation

== Cover tracks ==
Song	Released on	Original artist
"52 Girls"	Contains No Caffeine	The B-52's
"80 Times"	Conspiracy of One vinyl; "Want You Bad" single; Happy Hour! compilation	T.S.O.L.
"...Baby One More Time"	Only played live (MTV Cover in the Park)	Britney Spears
"Autonomy"	"Want You Bad" single; Happy Hour! compilation	Buzzcocks
"Ballroom Blitz"	6 Songs demo	Sweet
"Basket Case"	Only played live	Green Day
"Blitzkrieg Bop"	Only played live	Ramones
"Bloodstains"	Ready to Rumble soundtrack	Agent Orange
"Do What You Want"	Summer Nationals EP	Bad Religion
"Down"	Never-Ending Summer EP	311
"Eyes Of a Stranger"	Only played live	Payolas
"Feelings"	Americana	Morris Albert
"Faith"	Only played live	George Michael
"Here Kitty Kitty"	Here Kitty Kitty EP	Clinton Johnson Band
"Hey Joe"	Baghdad EP; Go Ahead Punk... Make My Day; "Gone Away" single; Happy Hour! compilation	Billy Roberts
"Iron Man"	Only played live	Black Sabbath
"I Got a Right"	Club Me EP; "The Meaning of Life" single; Happy Hour! compilation	Iggy Pop and the Stooges
"I Wanna Be Sedated"	"Why Don't You Get a Job?" single; We're a Happy Family: A Tribute to Ramones; Idle Hands soundtrack	Ramones
"Killboy Powerhead"	Smash	The Didjits
"Kumbaya"	Huck It	Stephen Winick
"My Favourite Game"	Only played live (MTV Cover in the Park)	The Cardigans
"Next to You"	Greatest Hits	The Police
"No Control"	Summer Nationals EP	Bad Religion
"No Reason Why"	Summer Nationals EP	Pennywise
"O.C. Life"	Rise and Fall, Rage and Grace	Rikk Agnew / D.I.
"One Hundred Punks"	"Defy You" single; "Can't Repeat" single	Generation X
"Shout"	Only played live	The Isley Brothers
"Sin City"	"Million Miles Away" single; Happy Hour! compilation	AC/DC
"Smash It Up"	Batman Forever soundtrack; Club Me EP; "All I Want" single	The Damned
"Stand by Me"	Only played live (Dexter together with Pennywise)	Ben E. King
"Story Of My Life"	Only played live	One Direction
"Sweet Child o' Mine"	Only played live	Guns N' Roses
"The Beautiful People"	Only played live (MTV Cover in the Park)	Marilyn Manson
"The Chain"	Only played live	Fleetwood Mac
"Territorial Pissings"	Only played live	Nirvana
"Totalimmortal"	Me, Myself & Irene soundtrack	AFI
"Undone – The Sweater Song"	Only played live	Weezer
"When I Come Around"	Only played live	Green Day
"When You Say Nothing at All"	Only played live (MTV Cover in the Park)	Ronan Keating
"Whole Lotta Rosie"	Only played live	AC/DC

== Videos ==
=== Video albums ===
Year	Video album details	Certifications (sales thresholds)
1998	Americana: Released: December 8, 1998; Label: Nitro, Columbia; Formats: VHS, DVD	
2000	Huck It: Released: December 12, 2000; Label: Columbia; Formats: VHS, DVD	ARIA: Gold
2005	Complete Music Video Collection: Released: July 19, 2005; Label: Columbia; Formats: DVD, UMD	RIAA: Gold; ARIA: Platinum; MC: Gold

=== Music videos ===
Year	Song	Director / designer
1988	"Jennifer Lost the War"	
1994	"Come Out and Play"	Darren Lavett
1994	"Self Esteem"	Darren Lavett
1995	"Gotta Get Away"	Samuel Bayer
1997	"All I Want"	David Yow
1997	"The Meaning of Life"	Kevin Kerslake
1997	"I Choose"	Dexter Holland
1998	"Gone Away"	Nigel Dick
1998	"Pretty Fly (for a White Guy)"	McG
1999	"Why Don't You Get a Job?"	McG
1999	"The Kids Aren't Alright"	Yariv Gaber
1999	"She's Got Issues"	Jonathan Dayton and Valerie Faris
2000	"Original Prankster" (featuring Redman)	David Meyers
2001	"Want You Bad"	Spencer Susser
2001	"Million Miles Away"	Jennifer Lebeau
2001	"Defy You"	David Meyers
2003	"Da Hui"	Paul Cobb
2004	"Hit That"	John Williams and David Lea
2004	"(Can't Get My) Head Around You"	Joseph Kahn
2005	"Can't Repeat"	Ramon & Pedro
2008	"Hammerhead"	Teqtonik
2008	"You're Gonna Go Far, Kid"	Chris Hopewell
2009	"Kristy, Are You Doing Okay?"	Lex Halaby
2009	"Stuff Is Messed Up"	F. Scott Schafer and Sean Evans
2012	"Days Go By"	Lex Halaby
2012	"Cruising California (Bumpin' in My Trunk)"	Mickey Finnegan
2014	"Dividing By Zero / Slim Pickens Does The Right Thing And Rides The Bomb To Hell"	Anthony F Schepperd
2015	"Coming for You"	Josh Forbes
2020	"Here Kitty Kitty"	The Offspring
2020	"Christmas (Baby Please Come Home)"	The Offspring
2021	"Let the Bad Times Roll"	Marc Klasfeld
2021	"We Never Have Sex Anymore"	F. Scott Schafer
2021	"This is Not Utopia"	Samuel Bayer
2021	"The Opioid Diaries"	Daveed Benito
2021	"Gone Away (Live 2021)"	The Offspring
2022	"Behind Your Walls"	Jeb Hardwick
2022	"Bells Will Be Ringing (Please Come Home For Christmas)"	The Offspring
2024	"Make It All Right"	Margaret Bialis
2025	"Ok, But This Is The Last Time"	Marc Klasfeld
2025	"Come To Brazil"	CiRCUS HEaD
2025	"Truth In Fiction"	The Offspring
2026	"Pretty Fly (for a White Guy)" (8onthebeat Mix)	Pedro Aranda Mejia and David Francisco Aranda Mejia
2026	"I Wanna Be Sedated" (Ramones Cover)	The Offspring
2026	"Coming for You" (Hometown Remix)	The Offspring & Anaheim Ducks
2026	"Jennifer Lost the War" (Live at Stone Pony 2026)	The Offspring

== See also ==
- List of songs recorded by The Offspring
