= I'll Be Waiting (The Offspring song) =

1986 single by the Offspring

- From left to right: Dexter Holland, Noodles, James Lilja, Greg K

Single by the Offspring
- B-side: "Blackball"
- Released: July 1986
- Recorded: 1986 at South Coast Recording in Santa Ana, California
- Genre: Punk rock; hardcore punk
- Length: 3:26
- Label: Black Label
- Songwriter: Dexter Holland
- Producers: The Offspring; Jim Dotson

The Offspring singles chronology
"I'll Be Waiting" (1986)	"Come Out And Play (Keep 'Em Separated)" (1994)

"I'll Be Waiting"

Song by the Offspring

from the album The Offspring
- Released: June 15, 1989
- Recorded: March 1989
- Studio: South Coast Recording in Santa Ana, California (USA).
- Genre: Punk rock; hardcore punk
- Length: 3:12
- Label: Nemesis; Nitro
- Songwriter: Dexter Holland
- Producer: Thom Wilson

"I'll Be Waiting" is the first single by punk rock band the Offspring released in 1986. A re-recorded version of the song appeared as the tenth track on their self-titled debut album, which was released three years later. It was the band's first official release and is the only single issued by the band with original drummer James Lilja.

== Versions ==
Several versions of "I'll Be Waiting" were released. One was released in 1986 as a 7" single, with "Blackball" as the B-side, and was the band's first official release. This single was reissued in 1994, following the Offspring's commercial success with their third studio album Smash. A demo version of "I'll Be Waiting" (then-known as "Fire and Ice") was recorded for the band's demo 6 Songs earlier in July 1986. That version can be heard on the long-out of print Subject to Blackout compilation tape, which was also released in 1986 (this version is also available for free to download from the European Offspring website).

After James Lilja left the band, drumming duties were left to Ron Welty, who assisted the band in re-recording both tracks featured on the single for the Offspring's debut self-titled album which was released in 1989 (and re-released in 1995). "Blackball" and "I'll Be Waiting" were both produced by Thom Wilson.

The re-recording of "Blackball" (the B-side of the single) from the band's self-titled LP was featured in the video game Tony Hawk's Pro Skater 4.

== Cover ==
The band members are depicted as shadows on the "I'll Be Waiting" single's cover in black and white, behind the Offspring logo. On their self-titled LP's insert and back cover, as well as on the 1995 reissue of the same album, the same cover can be found.

== Track listing ==
All tracks are written by Dexter Holland.

No.	Title	Length
1.	"I'll Be Waiting"	3:26
2.	"Blackball"	3:06
Total length:		6:32

== Release ==
The band itself released "I'll Be Waiting" on Black Label Records (which the band named after a brand of beer), as a 7" vinyl record. Only 1000 copies of this record were made.

== Personnel ==
=== 1986 single version ===
- Dexter Holland (credited as B. Holland) – vocals, guitar (uncredited for guitar)
- Noodles (credited as Child C-2017) – guitar, backing vocals (uncredited for backing vocals)
- Greg K. (credited as Greggor) – bass, backing vocals (uncredited for backing vocals)
- James Lilja (credited as James Frederick Lilja) – drums, backing vocals (uncredited for backing vocals)

=== 1989 album version ===
- Dexter Holland – vocals, guitar
- Noodles – guitar
- Greg K. – bass
- Ron Welty – drums
