= Huck It =

Video by The Offspring
- Released: 2000
- Recorded: 1998–2000
- Genre: Punk rock Alternative rock Skate punk
- Length: Approx 55. minutes
- Label: Columbia
- Producer: Paul Cobb; Dexter Holland

The Offspring chronology
Americana (1998)	Huck It (2000)	Complete Music Video Collection (2005)

Professional ratings
Review scores
Source	Rating
AllMusic	3/5 stars
AllMovie	3/5 stars

Huck It is a video album (released in VHS and DVD formats) by the American punk rock band The Offspring. Created in the Conspiracy of One era, it is named after the bonus song on that album. The song itself is featured frequently in the video, alongside other Offspring songs, mainly from Ixnay on the Hombre, Americana, and Conspiracy of One.

The video's main content is that of stunt or skate videos to a soundtrack from The Offspring. Live performances and interviews or videos of each member of the band are also included. Numerous scenes from the video are also available on The Offspring's official YouTube channel, offspringtv.

== Track listing ==
1. "Intro" – The video opens with the instrumental section of "Pay the Man" over a time lapse of a hill and lake while the opening credits are displayed intermittently.
2. "Meet Greg K" – "Special Delivery" plays over a stunt video of Greg K., the band's bassist, scaling an extremely high structure, and then jumping off. The video does not show him using a parachute and instead jokingly ends with an obvious dummy hitting the ground at high speed. The instrumental part of "Pay the Man" then resumes as Greg plays golf at his house. He hits one of the balls through his window, then proceeds to hit the hole with his club.
3. "L.A.P.D." – A live performance of "L.A.P.D." (from Ignition) follows, performed at Huntington Beach. Crude special effects are in use, such as covering band members' skin with skulls and bones. Near the end of the song, singer Dexter Holland forgets the words.
4. "Skateboard Huck It" – The titular song, "Huck It", then plays over various stunts. The first stunt shows Dexter on a bicycle, pulling then-drummer Ron Welty, who is on a skateboard. Noodles and Greg are lying on the ground, a skateboard next to them. When Ron is close enough on the skateboard, he jumps to the other one and lands perfectly. From then on other skateboarders are shown skitching from a motorbike and then jumping over a large ramp.
5. "Staring at the Sun" – Following this is a continuation of the Huntington Beach show. The band tease the crowd by playing "Kumbaya" while a morphing effect is used on each member of the band's head. The Offspring then launch into a performance of "Staring at the Sun".
6. "Meet Ron Welty" – Shows him messing around and then the rest of the video is him surfing.
7. "Meet Dexter" – Featuring the song "Vultures" playing in the background while he does stunts in his plane then he jumps out of the plane and does stunts on his parachute and then an obvious dummy hits a barn wall.
8. "All I Want"
9. "BMX Huck It"
10. "Gone Away"
11. "Meet Noodles"
12. "Credits"

=== Bonus ===
1. "The Kids Aren't Alright"
2. "Meet the Crew" – Features a cameo of Daniel Johns from Silverchair.
3. "Random Outtakes"

== Certifications ==
Region	Certification	Certified units/sales
Australia (ARIA)	Gold	7,500^{^}
Canada (Music Canada)	Diamond	100,000^{^}
^{^} Shipments figures based on certification alone.
