= Coming for You =

Single by the Offspring

from the album Let the Bad Times Roll
- Released: January 30, 2015
- Recorded: 2014
- Genre: Punk rock; pop punk
- Length: 3:49
- Label: Time Bomb
- Songwriter: Dexter Holland
- Producer: Bob Rock

The Offspring singles chronology
"Turning into You" (2012)	"Coming for You" (2015)	"Sharknado" (2016)

Music video
- "Coming for You" on YouTube

"Coming for You" is a song by the American punk rock band the Offspring. It was premiered on Radio Contraband on January 30, 2015, and posted on YouTube and made available for digital download the same day. "Coming for You" was the Offspring's second official new release (following the 2014 covers EP Summer Nationals) since Days Go By (2012), and a modified version of the song appeared six years later on the band's tenth studio album, Let the Bad Times Roll (2021), with minor changes to the lyrics and re-recorded bass by frontman Dexter Holland (as original bassist Greg K. had left the band in 2018). The single climbed on various Billboard rock charts, reaching No. 1 on Mainstream Rock (the band's first since "Gone Away" in 1997), top 20 on Alternative Songs, and top 25 on overall Hot Rock Songs.

At first it was uncertain if "Coming for You" would be a one-off single or would appear on the band's then-upcoming tenth studio album, but a tweet from Holland heavily implied the album was in an unfinished state. The Offspring toured worldwide in support of the single. The song was named the official theme song for the WWE Elimination Chamber 2015.

== Videos ==
Accompanying the song's release was a video featuring still photos of the band performing at various venues and festivals around the world, interspersed with crowd shots. On March 18, 2015, the official music video was released. The video features a fight club, but with clowns. The band does not appear in the video.

== Reception ==
In a positive review, Zumic.com called the song a "mid-tempo punk anthem" with "aggressive distorted guitar chords." It also commented, "thick bass lines are strong, and drummer Pete Parada’s power behind the kit is relentless. The tune sounds fresh and alive, and proves that the band can still deliver high energy punk anthems." By mid April, "Coming For You" climbed to No. 1 on US Mainstream Rock, the band's second after "Gone Away".

== Charts ==
=== Weekly charts ===
Weekly chart performance for "Coming for You"
Chart (2015)	peak position
Canada Rock (Billboard)	2
Czech Republic Rock (IFPI)	1
Finland Airplay (Radiosoittolista)	61
US Hot Rock & Alternative Songs (Billboard)	22
US Rock & Alternative Airplay (Billboard)	7

=== Year-end charts ===
Year-end chart performance for "Coming for You"
Chart (2015)	Position
US Hot Rock Songs (Billboard)	85
US Rock Airplay (Billboard)	29

== Personnel ==
- Dexter Holland – vocals, guitar, bass (album version)
- Noodles – guitar, vocals
- Greg K. – bass, vocals (single version)
- Pete Parada – drums

== In popular culture ==
Since 2024, the Anaheim Ducks of the National Hockey League have used this song after scoring goals at their home arena, the Honda Center. The team began using this song following an Orange County-centered rebrand along with collaborations with the band the previous season.
