= A Chorus of Disapproval =

A Chorus of Disapproval may refer to:

- A Chorus of Disapproval (play), a 1984 play by Alan Ayckbourn
- A Chorus of Disapproval (film), a 1988 film adaptation of the play of the same title
- A Chorus of Disapproval (band), a straight edge hardcore band signed by Nemesis Records
