= David Kriesel =

David Kriesel may refer to:

- Greg K., American musician who was born Gregory David Kriesel
- David Kriesel (scientist), German computer scientist who revealed the Xerox character substitution bug
