= Chris Higgins (musician) =

American musician (born 1972)

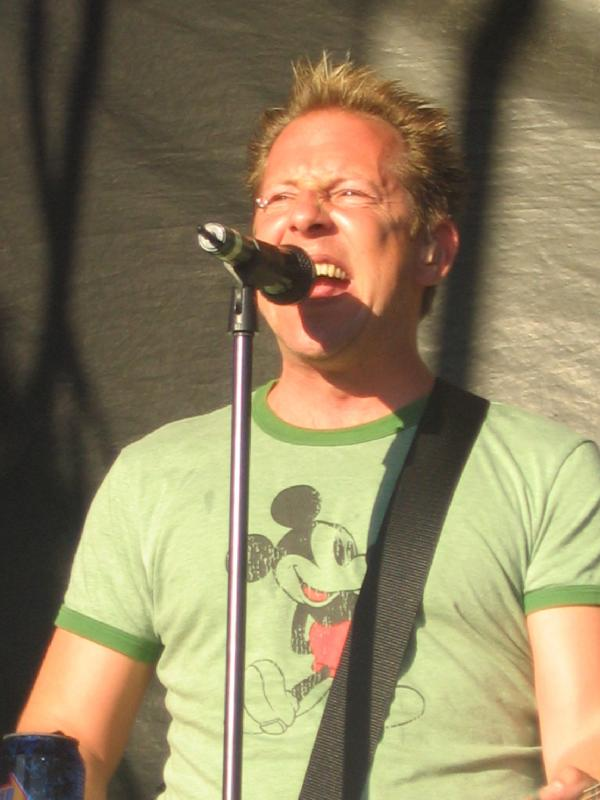

Background information
- Also known as: X-13, Cosmic Chris
- Born: Christopher Higgins; September 23, 1972 (age 53)
- Origin: United States
- Genres: Punk rock; pop punk; skate punk; alternative rock
- Occupation: Musician
- Instruments: Vocals; guitar; keyboards; percussion; bass
- Years active: 1994–present
- Label: Columbia
- Member of: Wank , Sleeping Dogs
- Formerly of: The Offspring, Good Kitty,

Christopher Higgins, best known by his stage name Higgins X-13 (born September 23, 1972), is an American musician, best known for being the touring guitarist, keyboardist, and percussionist for the punk rock band the Offspring.

== Career ==
=== The Offspring ===
Higgins joined the Offspring in 1994, shortly after their breakthrough with their third studio album Smash (1994) as a member of the road crew. Even during that first tour, he performed with the band on certain songs as "Come Out and Play". Over the years he transitioned into a touring member, playing percussion, rhythm guitar and keyboards. During his time with the band, he also handled a variety of roles, including running the group’s Orange County studio, producing demo recordings of its upcoming albums, serving as stage manager and providing backing vocals on several albums. He provided backing vocals for Offspring's studio albums between Americana and Rise and Fall, Rage and Grace. During his 11 years with the band, he performed live with the Offspring on tour and made an appearance in the music video for "Why Don't You Get a Job?".

As of 2005, he was no longer with The Offspring on the tour but he did backup vocals on Rise and Fall, Rage and Grace. According to his former bandmate Noodles, Higgins left The Offspring to spend more time with his family and church.

=== Wank ===
In 2017 Higgins joined the reformed band Wank, a 90s Orange County ska-punk band whose best known song was "Forgiven". In 1998 Wank was signed to Maverick Records, re-releasing their debut album Get a Grip on Yourself. Higgins appears on Wank's 2018 release "White Knuckle Ride" and the 2022 single "The States". Wank briefly worked with Die Laughing Records in 2019 and played various shows from 2015 through 2020, pausing due to the COVID-19 pandemic.

=== Sleeping Dogs ===
As of 2021 Wank created a spin-off project called Sleeping Dogs that includes the members of Wank with the addition of Keyboardist George Hughes - with both groups led by bassist and vocalist Bobby Amodeo. Sleeping Dogs' sound isn't significantly different from Wank, which makes sense considering the two bands share four members. Their debut song and video "No Mercy" was released in November 2021.

=== Further work ===
Higgins also played guitar and did some vocals in the bands Gentleman Jack, All the Madmen (Working Class Zeroes) and Good Kitty.

As of March 2023 he was involved in digital media and visual communications at St. John's Lutheran Church of Orange, California.

== Discography ==
=== With The Offspring ===
==== Studio albums ====
- 1998 — Americana
- 2000 — Conspiracy of One
- 2003 — Splinter
- 2008 — Rise and Fall, Rage and Grace

=== With AFI ===
==== Studio albums ====
- 2000 — The Art of Drowning (backing vocals)

=== With T.S.O.L. ===
==== Studio albums ====
- 2003 — Divided We Stand (backing vocals)
