= Next to You (The Police song) =

1978 song by English rock band The Police

Song by The Police

from the album Outlandos d'Amour
- Released: 2 November 1978
- Recorded: 1978
- Genre: Punk rock; pop-punk
- Length: 2:50
- Label: A&M
- Songwriter: Sting
- Producer: The Police

Music video
- "Next to You" on YouTube

"Next to You" is a song written by Sting and recorded by The Police as the opening track on their debut album Outlandos d'Amour in 1978.

The band performed the song regularly on its early tours, and Sting later included it during his "Broken Music" tour in 2005–2006. It was the song performed for the second encore during The Police's 2007 Reunion tour. In the Paris show (on 29 September), former band member Henry Padovani joined the band on stage to play this song. "Next to You" is the last song The Police played live together.

When Sting originally presented the song to his bandmates, they felt it was neither aggressive nor political enough for the band's early punk sensibility. Andy Summers and Stewart Copeland suggested replacing the lyrics, with Summers offering "I'm going to take a gun to you". Sting vetoed this and kept his original love song lyrics instead. The song also includes a slide guitar solo which Copeland dismissed as "old wave," yet Summers said in 2000 that he was still getting letters "about that brilliant slide guitar solo".

== The Offspring version ==
The American punk band the Offspring recorded a cover version of this song as one of the two singles for their Greatest Hits album along with "Can't Repeat". It's the band's only song to feature drummer Atom Willard. "Next to You" was released as a single to promote Greatest Hits and it peaked at No. 29 on the Mainstream Rock Tracks chart.

"Next to You"

Single by The Offspring

from the album Greatest Hits
- Written: Sting
- Released: 21 June 2005
- Recorded: 2004
- Genre: Punk rock
- Length: 2:39
- Label: Columbia
- Songwriter: Sting
- Producer: Jerry Finn

The Offspring singles chronology
"Can't Repeat" (2005)	"Next to You" (2005)	"Hammerhead" (2008)

=== Personnel ===
==== The Offspring ====
- Dexter Holland – vocals, guitar
- Noodles – guitar
- Greg K. – bass
- Atom Willard – drums
