= She's Got Issues =

1999 single by the Offspring

Single by the Offspring

from the album Americana
- Released: November 22, 1999
- Genre: Pop-punk
- Length: 3:48
- Label: Columbia
- Songwriter: Dexter Holland
- Producer: Dave Jerden

The Offspring singles chronology
"The Kids Aren't Alright" (1999)	"She's Got Issues" (1999)	"Original Prankster" (2000)

Music video
- "She's Got Issues" on YouTube

"She's Got Issues" is a song by American rock band the Offspring. It is the seventh track on their fifth studio album, Americana (1998), and was released as the fourth and final single in November 1999. The song also appears as the third track on the EP A Piece of Americana (1998).

== Composition ==
The lyrics to the song have a narrator calling out on his angsty, victim-playing girlfriend. As singer Dexter Holland described, "Today everyone has issues and no one takes responsibility because their mother or their father drank too much or whatever". The title is inspired by the "typical psychobabble" present in talk shows.

== Music video ==
The video, directed by Jonathan Dayton and Valerie Faris and animated by Wayne White, shows a usual workday of a young adult woman (played by a pre-fame Zooey Deschanel), and the things in her everyday life that she finds disturbing or annoying, are enhanced by grotesque cartoons, which represent her imagination. On the Making the Video episode for "She's Got Issues", Dexter Holland described it as an "anti-video" for its highly conceptual nature.

The woman is first shown sleeping in her bed. She wakes up and fries two eggs for breakfast. After watching TV while eating, she changes into her clothes and goes downstairs. She then takes the subway to work at a photo printing shop. She gets caught by her boss stealing a photo and is fired after an argument. She consults her psychiatrist about her issues. She then runs back to her apartment and is welcomed by the band playing there.

Dexter Holland states on the DVD commentary for The Complete Music Video Collection that while he enjoyed working with the directors, he ultimately didn't feel that the video turned out how he thought it would.

== Track listings ==
European maxi-CD single

No.	Title	Length
1.	"She's Got Issues"	3:49
2.	"The Kids Aren't Alright" (Full mix)	4:56
3.	"All I Want" (live)	2:29
4.	"Pretty Fly (for a White Guy)" (The Baka Boyz Low Rider remix)	3:01

UK CD1

No.	Title	Length
1.	"She's Got Issues"	3:49
2.	"The Kids Aren't Alright" (The Wiseguys mix)	4:56
3.	"The Kids Aren't Alright" (The Wiseguys instrumental)	4:56

UK CD2

No.	Title	Length
1.	"She's Got Issues"	3:49
2.	"All I Want" (Live)	2:02
3.	"The Kids Aren't Alright" (CD extra video)	4:56

== Charts ==
=== Weekly charts ===
Chart (1999–2000)	Peak position
Netherlands (Single Top 100)	89
Scottish Singles Sales (Official Charts)	34
Sweden (Sverigetopplistan)	59
Switzerland (Schweizer Hitparade)	60
UK Singles (Official Charts)	41
UK Rock & Metal (Official Charts)	1
US Alternative Airplay (Billboard)	11
US Mainstream Rock (Billboard)	19

=== Weekly charts ===
Chart (2000)	Position
US Mainstream Rock Tracks (Billboard)	90
US Modern Rock Tracks (Billboard)	91

== Release history ==
Region	Date	Format(s)	Label(s)	Ref.
United States	September 28, 1999	Mainstream rock; active rock radio	Columbia	
United Kingdom	November 22, 1999	CD; cassette	Columbia	
