= Thom Wilson =

American record producer

- Born: Thomas Wilson
- Died: February 8, 2015
- Genres: Punk rock
- Occupation: Record producer
- Years active: 1976–2003

Thom Wilson (died February 8, 2015) was an American punk rock record producer and engineer.

== Career ==
Wilson began his musical career in the mid-1970s, engineering recordings by soft rock artists Burton Cummings and Seals & Crofts. He began working on punk rock albums in the early 1980s while producing the Adolescents' self-titled debut album (also known as The Blue Album). Throughout his career, he would also produce and engineer albums for numerous artists, such as Dead Kennedys, T.S.O.L., D.O.A., Bad Religion, The Joykiller, Social Distortion, The Vandals, The Offspring, Christian Death, Automatic 7, Face to Face and The Bouncing Souls.

Wilson produced The Offspring's first three albums The Offspring (1989), Ignition (1992) and their breakthrough Smash (1994). He also produced the band's 1991 7-inch EP Baghdad.

Wilson died on February 8, 2015.

== Selected discography ==
- My Own Way to Rock - Burton Cummings (1977)
- Takin' It Easy - Seals and Crofts (1978)
- Disconnected - Stiv Bators (1981)
- The Adolescents - The Adolescents (1981)
- Dance with Me - T.S.O.L. (1981)
- Death of Innocence - Legal Weapon (1982)
- All by Myself - Rikk Agnew (1982)
- Only Theatre of Pain - Christian Death (1982)
- Plastic Surgery Disasters - Dead Kennedys (1982)
- 13.13 - Lydia Lunch (1982)
- Up and Down the Aisle - Red Wedding (1982)
- Weathered Statues - T.S.O.L. (1982)
- Peace thru Vandalism (EP) - The Vandals (1982)
- Beneath the Shadows - T.S.O.L. (1982)
- War on 45 - D.O.A. (1982)
- Into the Unknown - Bad Religion (1983)
- Sound & Fury - Youth Brigade (1983)
- Mommy's Little Monster - Social Distortion (1983)
- When in Rome Do as the Vandals - The Vandals (1984)
- Slippery When Ill - The Vandals (1989)
- The Offspring - The Offspring (1989)
- Baghdad (EP) - The Offspring (1991)
- Kings of Gangster Bop - Royal Crown Revue (1991)
- Ignition - The Offspring (1992)
- Smash - The Offspring (1994)
- Big Choice - Face to Face (1994)
- Sons of Intemperance Offering - Phil Cody (1996)
- Naughty Little Doggie - Iggy Pop (1996)
- Maniacal Laughter - The Bouncing Souls (1996)
- The Bouncing Souls - The Bouncing Souls (1997)
- How Ace Are Buildings - A (1997)
- Out on a Wire - Eve Selis (1998)
- Hopeless Romantic - The Bouncing Souls (1999)
- The Aquabats! vs. the Floating Eye of Death! - The Aquabats (1999)
- A Place Called Home - Ignite (2000)
- Devil in Paradise (EP) - Mock (2001)
- Disappear - T.S.O.L. (2001)
- Ready Sexed Go! - The Joykiller (2003)
