= Can't Repeat =

Single by the Offspring

from the album Greatest Hits
- Released: June 20, 2005
- Recorded: 2004
- Genre: Punk rock
- Length: 3:27
- Label: Columbia
- Songwriter: Dexter Holland
- Producer: Jerry Finn

The Offspring singles chronology
"Spare Me the Details" (2004)	"Can't Repeat" (2005)	"Next to You" (2005)

"Can't Repeat" is a single by American punk rock band the Offspring. "Can't Repeat" was released to radio on May 10, 2005. It is the first track on their compilation album, Greatest Hits, and is its only original track. It was released on June 20, 2005, a day before the album was released.

== Music video ==
The music video for the song simply featured the band playing in a derelict room, and it received little airtime on MTV. An alternate version was made showing actors looking back on photographs and memories, reflecting the song's subject matter, though this was very rarely shown. It was the second and final video to feature Atom Willard playing the drums.

=== DVD appearances ===
The music video also appears on the Complete Music Video Collection DVD. It was released in 2005.

== Track listing ==
No.	Title	Length
1.	"Can't Repeat"	3:27
2.	"One Hundred Punks" (Generation X cover)	3:13
3.	"(Can't Get My) Head Around You"	2:13

== Charts ==
=== Weekly charts ===
Weekly chart performance for "Can't Repeat"
Chart (2005)	Peak position
Canada Rock Top 30 (Radio & Records)	12
Finland (Suomen virallinen lista)	22
Netherlands (Dutch Top 40 Tipparade)	22
US Bubbling Under Hot 100 (Billboard)	10
US Alternative Airplay (Billboard)	9
US Mainstream Rock Airplay (Billboard)	10

=== Year-end charts ===
Year-end chart performance for "Can't Repeat"
Chart (2005)	Position
US Modern Rock Tracks (Billboard)	47
