= Baghdad (EP) =

EP by The Offspring
- Released: August 1991
- Recorded: February 1991
- Studios: Sound Chamber, Pasadena, California
- Genre: Punk rock
- Length: 11:01
- Label: Nemesis
- Producer: Thom Wilson

The Offspring chronology
| The Offspring (1989) | Baghdad (1991) | Ignition (1992) |

Baghdad is a 7-inch EP, released by American punk rock band the Offspring in August 1991. It is currently out of print, but sold 3000 copies within one week of its release. Although Baghdad has never been reissued on CD in its entirety, the title track, "Baghdad", a re-recorded version of "Tehran" from the band's debut studio album, was included on the Rock Against Bush, Vol. 1 compilation from Fat Wreck Chords. As of 2026, the band's official website does not list Baghdad in the discography.

== Track notes ==
The EP includes an early version of "Get It Right", of which a later version was released on their second studio album Ignition. The title track "Baghdad" was a re-recording of the song "Tehran" which appeared on the Offspring's debut self-titled album in 1989. It switches the words "Tehran" (the capital of Iran) for "Baghdad" (the capital of Iraq). The EP includes a re-recorded cover version of "Hey Joe" composed by Billy Roberts, the original recording of which was released as a bonus track on the cassette version of the 1989 debut (that same recording was released on the "Gone Away" single and Happy Hour!). A previously unreleased instrumental track "The Blurb", which would not appear on any future releases, served as the basis for an early version of "Genocide", as well as "Change the World".

== Track listing ==
All tracks are written by Dexter Holland, except where noted.

| No. | Title | Writer(s) | Length |
|---|---|---|---|
| 1. | "Get It Right" | | 3:07 |
| 2. | "Hey Joe" (Billy Roberts cover) | Billy Roberts | 2:38 |
| 3. | "Baghdad" | | 3:17 |
| 4. | "The Blurb" (Instrumental) | | 1:59 |
| Total length: | | | 11:01 |

== Personnel ==
=== The Offspring ===
- Dexter Holland (credited as Keith Holland) – vocals, guitar (uncredited for guitar)
- Noodles – guitar
- Greg K. – bass
- Ron Welty (credited as R. Welty) – drums

=== Production ===
- Thom Wilson – producer
- Rusty Striff – engineer
- Kirk Dominguez – insert/back photos
- Shelly, Rick and Michelle – posers on photos
- Joy Aoki – design

== See also ==
- List of anti-war songs
