= Go Ahead Punk... Make My Day =

Compilation album by Various Artists
- Released: September 24, 1996
- Genre: Punk rock
- Length: 39:31
- Label: Nitro Records
- Producer: Various

Professional ratings
Review scores
Source	Rating
AllMusic	2/5 stars

Go Ahead Punk... Make My Day is a 1996 compilation album released on the Nitro Records label. The title is a reference to the Dirty Harry quote "Go ahead, make my day".

Only five bands appear on this compilation, with each band represented twice. All tracks sample current releases by Nitro Records artists, with the exception of "Hey Joe" by the Offspring, which is taken from the 1989 cassette release of their debut album (erroneously stated to be a previously unreleased recording).

== Track listing ==
No.	Title	Artist	Length
1.	"God's Kingdom" (from Teri Yakimoto)	Guttermouth	2:29
2.	"Marry Me" (from The Quickening)	The Vandals	2:17
3.	"He Who Laughs Last" (from Very Proud of Ya)	AFI	1:51
4.	"Tearing Down The World" (from Image Is Everything)	Jughead's Revenge	1:55
5.	"Hey Joe" (from The Offspring)	The Offspring	2:38
6.	"Let The Bad Times Roll" (from Live Fast, Diarrhea)	The Vandals	1:49
7.	"People's Pal" (from Image Is Everything)	Jughead's Revenge	2:21
8.	"Derek" (from Friendly People)	Guttermouth	2:10
9.	"Wake Up Call" (from Very Proud of Ya)	AFI	1:43
10.	"Beheaded" (from The Offspring)	The Offspring	2:52
Total length:			39:31
