= Summer Nationals =

EP by The Offspring
- Released: August 5, 2014
- Recorded: July 2014
- Genre: Punk rock
- Length: 5:37
- Label: Time Bomb
- Producer: Bob Rock

The Offspring chronology
Days Go By (2012)	Summer Nationals (2014)	Let the Bad Times Roll (2021)

Summer Nationals is the third EP by the American punk rock band The Offspring, released digitally in 2014 to coincide with the Summer Nationals tour with Bad Religion, Pennywise, The Vandals, Stiff Little Fingers and Naked Raygun. The EP contains covers of Bad Religion and Pennywise songs, and was released on Time Bomb, making this The Offspring's first venture away from Columbia since 1994's Smash.

== Track listing ==
No.	Title	Writer(s)	Original artist	Length
1.	"Do What You Want"	Brett Gurewitz	Bad Religion	1:09
2.	"No Control"	Greg Graffin	Bad Religion	1:47
3.	"No Reason Why"	Pennywise	Pennywise	2:43
Total length:				5:37
