= The Offspring (album) =

- Original cover art

Studio album by the Offspring
- Released: October 1989
- Recorded: Summer 1989
- Studios: South Coast Recording in Santa Ana, California (USA).
- Genres: Punk rock; hardcore punk
- Length: 31:25
- Labels: Nemesis; Nitro
- Producer: Thom Wilson

The Offspring chronology
The Offspring (1989)	Baghdad (1991)

The Offspring studio chronology
The Offspring (1989)	Ignition (1992)

Singles from The Offspring
- 1. "I'll Be Waiting" Released: July 1986

Alternative cover
- Re-issue cover art

The Offspring is the debut studio album by American rock band the Offspring, released in October 1989, by Nemesis Records. After being out of print for years, the album was re-released by Nitro and Epitaph Records in 1995 with a different album cover. Both the re-releases on the two respective labels are nearly identical. The Offspring has rarely played any songs from this album live since the early-to-mid-1990s when they were touring for either Ignition or Smash.

== Background and history ==
After recording a demo tape in 1988, the Offspring began preparations for their first full-length album. They recorded it during the summer of 1989 at South Coast Recording in Santa Ana, California, with Thom Wilson producing. During the sessions, the band re-recorded their early songs "I'll Be Waiting" and "Blackball", which both originally appeared on the band's 1986 single "I'll Be Waiting".

The album was released in October 1989, in limited numbers by Nemesis Records, only in 12" vinyl and cassette format. When it was released, the album initially sold 5,000 copies and it took the band two and a half years to sell them all. The album's closing track "Kill the President" was met with a great deal of controversy and as a result, one of the copies was destroyed by Wally George at his show Hot Seat in 1992, thus leaving only 4,999 copies left. This song was removed from the reissues after 2001. Some copies also have the Cargo Records logo next to the Nemesis logo on the back cover. To support the album, The Offspring embarked on a six-week national tour, but Noodles was stabbed during a performance at the Hollywood anti-nuclear benefit. Following the small success of The Offspring, the band signed with Epitaph Records in 1991.

The band has rarely performed anything live from The Offspring since the commercial success of their third album Smash. "Beheaded" is the only song from the album that has appeared on setlists occasionally after the Smash tour, and has been performed live at least 60 times as of August 2026. In addition to "Beheaded", the band played "Jennifer Lost the War", "Elders", "Crossroads", "Tehran", "A Thousand Days" and "Blackball" for the first time in years on their "Just the Punk Stuff!" live shows in the summer of 2026.

For a long time, it had been incorrectly assumed that there were three distinct recordings of "Hey Joe" due to the song being erroneously credited as "previously unreleased" when it was re-released officially in 1996.

== Reception ==
Professional ratings
Review scores
Source	Rating
AllMusic	2.5/5 stars
The Rolling Stone Album Guide	2/5 stars

The Offspring received mixed reviews. AllMusic writer Stephen Thomas Erlewine stated that The Offspring "is a rawer, harder-edged collection than their breakthrough set, Smash, but that doesn't necessarily mean it's a better record", and that it "lacks the metal guitar crunch that dominated Smash.".

The Offspring did not initially reach the Billboard 200 chart or become a commercial success. However, when the album was reissued in 1995, it reached a peak position of number 85 on the Dutch Chart for three weeks.

== Reissues ==
The Offspring was reissued several times, with formats in different countries, and with different labels (see the table below). The album was reissued on CD (and again on vinyl and cassette) in 1995, a year after the Offspring's commercial success with its third studio album Smash. This version is nearly identical to the one released on Nemesis. It features a different artwork instead of the controversial "Guitar Alien" front cover artwork, designed by Marc Rude. The album was reissued once again on Nitro in 2001, with "Kill the President" omitted; according to frontman Dexter Holland, it was removed to prevent legal pressure falling upon the band and Nitro. Coinciding with Record Store Day, The Offspring was reissued in 2017 on blue translucent vinyl; like the 2001 reissue, it does not include "Kill the President".

Region	Date	Label	Format	Catalog #	Notes
United States	June 15, 1989	Nemesis Records	12" vinyl Cassette	NEMESIS 6	First pressing. Cassette release includes bonus track "Hey Joe".
Europe	November 18, 1995	Epitaph Records	CD; 12" vinyl Cassette	86460	First CD pressing; features an alternative cover.
United States	November 21, 1995	Nitro Records	CD; 12" vinyl Cassette	86460	First CD and cassette pressing; features an alternative cover.
Poland	1996	Audio Max	Cassette	704	Rare collector's item, released without The Offspring's consent; features an alternative cover.
United States	June 26, 2001	Nitro Records	CD	15803	Does not feature the last song "Kill the President"; features the same cover as 1995 reissue.
United Kingdom	July 16, 2001	Nitro Records	CD		Does not feature the last song "Kill the President"; features the same cover as 1995 reissue.
United States	April 22, 2017	Nitro Records	Vinyl	NTO00001	Does not feature the last song "Kill the President"; features the same cover as 1995 reissue.

== Album covers ==
Two covers of this album exist. The original version features an image of a man's body exploding as the xenomorph from the Alien franchise holding a Fender Stratocaster emerges from his chest. There is a report, which remains unconfirmed, that the album was banned from retail stores due to the "grotesque" cover.

The 1995 re-release shows a different image which features a blurry black-and-white picture of a person's face. Lead singer Dexter Holland admitted that the band and their studio were never really fond of the original artwork and saw the reissue as an opportunity to replace it. The reissue art was done by Mackie Osbourne.

The shadows on the back cover of the 1995 reissue also appear on the cover of the "I'll Be Waiting" single.

== Track listing ==
All tracks are written by Dexter Holland, except "Beheaded" (Holland, James Lilja) and "Hey Joe" (William M. Roberts).

No.	Title	Length
1.	"Jennifer Lost the War"	2:35
2.	"Elders"	2:11
3.	"Out on Patrol"	2:32
4.	"Crossroads"	2:48
5.	"Demons (A Mexican Fiesta)"	3:10
6.	"Beheaded"	2:52
7.	"Tehran"	3:06
8.	"A Thousand Days"	2:11
9.	"Blackball"	3:24
10.	"I'll Be Waiting"	3:12
11.	"Kill the President" (excluded on rerelease versions since 2001)	3:22
Total length:		31:25

1989 cassette-only track
No.	Title	Length
12.	"Hey Joe"	2:37

Notes

- Track 1, "Jennifer Lost the War", is featured on Punk-O-Rama Volume 1.
- Track 6, "Beheaded", is featured on Go Ahead Punk... Make My Day and was later re-recorded as "Beheaded (1999)" for the movie Idle Hands.
- Track 7, "Tehran", was later re-recorded as "Baghdad", which appears on their 1991 long-out of print EP Baghdad.
- Track 9, "Blackball", is featured on Tony Hawk's Pro Skater 4.
- Track 11, "Kill the President" is removed from rerelease versions since 2001 and is replaced by four seconds of silence. On the official website, the song is not mentioned in the track list. The song is also not featured on the iTunes, Spotify or Amazon Music versions of the album.
- Track 12, "Hey Joe" (only released on the 1989 cassette), is featured on Go Ahead Punk... Make My Day, the single for "Gone Away," and Happy Hour!. It was also re-recorded for the Baghdad EP.

== Personnel ==
=== The Offspring ===
- Dexter Holland (credited as Keith Holland on 1989 version) – vocals, guitar (uncredited for guitar)
- Noodles – guitar, backing vocals on "Blackball"
- Greg K. – bass, backing vocals on "Blackball"
- Ron Welty (credited as R. Welty) – drums, backing vocals on "Blackball"

=== Additional personnel ===
- Jason – backing vocals on "Blackball"
- Jeff 1 – backing vocals on "Blackball"
- Jeff 2 – backing vocals on "Blackball"
- Tyler – backing vocals on "Blackball"
- Rick – backing vocals on "Blackball"
- Michelle – backing vocals on "Blackball"
- Marvin – backing vocals on "Blackball"
- Cynthia – backing vocals on "Blackball"

=== Production ===
- Thom Wilson – producer
- Jim Dotson (credited as Jim Oddo) – engineer
- Mad Marc Rude – cover art (for 1989 version)
- Kirk Dominquez (credited as Kirk) – back cover picture (for 1989 version)
- Mackie Osborne (credited as Mackie) – art (for 1995 version)

== Charts ==
Chart performance for The Offspring
Chart (1995)	Peak position
Australian Albums (ARIA)	84
Dutch Albums (Album Top 100)	85
UK Rock & Metal Albums (Official Charts)	20

== See also ==
- List of anti-war songs
