= James Lilja =

American musician and gynecologic oncologist

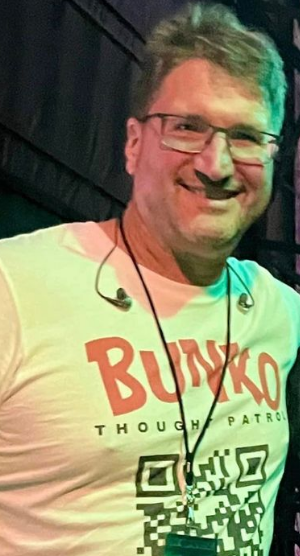
- Lilja in 2023

Background information
- Born: James Frederick Lilja; May 7, 1966 (age 59)
- Origin: United States
- Genres: Punk rock; hardcore punk
- Occupations: Musician; gynecologic oncologist
- Instrument: Drums
- Years active: 1984–present
- Label: Black Label
- Member of: Bunko
- Formerly of: The Offspring

James Frederick Lilja (born May 7, 1966) is an American gynecologic oncologist and a musician. He was the original drummer of the punk rock band the Offspring, performing with the band between 1984 and 1987.

== Collegiate education and The Offspring ==
Lilja attended the University of California, Los Angeles between 1984 and 1988, from which he graduated with a B.S. degree in Microbiology.

In 1984, Lilja joined the group Manic Subsidal, which eventually changed its name to The Offspring in 1986. Lilja played on the group's first demo tape in 1986, which earned them early exposure through a positive review in Maximumrocknroll magazine. Later that year, Lilja performed on the band's debut single, "I'll Be Waiting" released through Black Label Records. Lilja also helped write the song "Beheaded," later featured on the group's debut album, The Offspring (1989). Lilja amicably departed from the Offspring; frontman Dexter Holland has said that Lilja was so focused on getting into medical school that the band let him go on friendly terms. Lilja's position in the Offspring was filled by Ron Welty in 1987, who was only 16 years old at the time.

== Medical career ==
Lilja gained admission to the University of Pittsburgh School of Medicine, where he graduated with an M.D. degree in 1993.

After completing medical school, Lilja undertook an internship and residency at the University of Texas Health Science Center at Houston (1994–1997) and a fellowship at the University of Michigan Medical School (1998–2000). In 2001, he was board-certified by the American Board of Obstetrics and Gynecology as an obstetrician and gynecologist. He finished his fellowship at the University of Michigan in gynecologic oncology. In 2003, he was double board-certified as an obstetrician-gynecologist and gynecologic oncologist. He has practices in both San Jose and Fremont.

In 2018, while on trial in Oakland, California for medical malpractice, Lilja saved the life of a potential juror who went into cardiac arrest during the jury selection. Afterwards, the judge ruled a mistrial to avoid biases from any of the potential jurors who saw him save a life, and rescheduled his trial for a later date. The case went to arbitration and was dismissed.

== Later music endeavors ==
During medical school, Lilja formed a band with other medical students called the Oral Groove. In 2009, Lilja formed a band 11x. Lilja retains an active interest in rock music between practicing medicine. Lilja's latest band, Bunko was formed in 2016. Their debut EP, Thought Patrol was released on August 25, 2019. On August 5, 2023, Lilja joined the Offspring on stage for the first time since 1987 to perform the song "Beheaded" (which he had co-written with lead singer Dexter Holland).

== Discography ==
With Manic Subsidal

- We Got Power Part II – Party Animal (1985; the song "Hopeless")

With The Offspring

- I'll Be Waiting (1986)
- The Offspring (1989) (songwriting only)

With Bunko

- Thought Patrol (EP) (2019)
- "Halloween in China" (single) (2019)
- "Normal Guy" (single) (2019)
- "Dipship Man" (single) (2019)
