= Ignition (The Offspring album) =

Studio album by the Offspring
- Released: September 25, 1992
- Recorded: June 1992
- Studios: Westbeach Recorders, Hollywood; Track Record, Hollywood
- Genres: Punk rock; skate punk; hardcore punk
- Length: 37:24
- Label: Epitaph
- Producer: Thom Wilson

The Offspring chronology
Baghdad (1991)	Ignition (1992)	Smash (1994)

The Offspring studio chronology
The Offspring (1989)	Ignition (1992)	Smash (1994)

Ignition is the second studio album by American punk rock band the Offspring, released in September 1992, by Epitaph Records. Issued during the alternative rock and grunge era, the album brought the band small success in Southern California as they started to gather a following. This success would continue to grow with their next album, Smash (1994).

Ignition was certified gold on January 22, 1996, nearly two years after the release of Smash, and has sold over one million copies worldwide. For the album's 20th anniversary in 2012, The Offspring played Ignition in its entirety for some selected concerts. They also performed the album in 2017 at a benefit concert for 924 Gilman Street.

The band re-recorded Ignition's sixth track "Dirty Magic" for their ninth studio album Days Go By, released twenty years later.

== Background and recording ==
In 1991, The Offspring teamed up with producer Thom Wilson to record the Baghdad 7-inch EP. This EP was instrumental to the band's signing with Epitaph Records. Wilson had been trying to get The Offspring to switch to Epitaph, a label run by Bad Religion guitarist Brett Gurewitz. Gurewitz felt that The Offspring was just not quite pronounced enough for his label, but Baghdad convinced him to give the band a shot. Thanks to the success of Baghdad, The Offspring managed to record their second full-length album. The band entered two recording studios, Westbeach Recorders and Track Record, in June 1992 to record Ignition, in a similar fashion to the production schedule for The Offspring and Baghdad, which were both recorded in roughly a month or less.

Some of the material (including "Take It Like a Man", which was originally recorded in 1991 for a Flipside magazine compilation, The Big One, and "Get It Right", which appeared on Baghdad) are updated versions of songs that were recorded around The Offspring/Baghdad-era. The album also had one outtake, "Mission from God", which was later slightly remixed and then released on the compilation album Punk-O-Rama Vol. 10 in 2005. "Mission from God" was then released as a bonus download when Ignition was reissued on vinyl, albeit in its original 1992 mix.

== Release and reception ==
Professional ratings
Review scores
Source	Rating
AllMusic	4/5 stars
Christgau's Consumer Guide	(neither)
The Rolling Stone Album Guide	2.5/5 stars
Spin Alternative Record Guide	5/10

Like their self-titled debut album, Ignition did not chart on the Billboard 200; however, The Offspring began to gather small success in the Southern region of California, mainly the areas of San Diego, Orange County and Los Angeles, and spent a-year-and-a-half touring relentlessly behind the album. Although no videos were released for Ignition, "Kick Him When He's Down" was released as an airplay-only single in 1995. Ignition was certified Gold on January 22, 1996, nearly two years after the release of Smash.

The album has received generally favorable reviews in the years since its initial release, with several reviewers having deemed Ignition one of The Offspring's best albums. In October 2011, the album was ranked number two (between Alice in Chains' Dirt and Bad Religion's Generator) on Guitar World magazine's top ten list of guitar albums of 1992.

On June 17, 2008, Epitaph re-released Ignition (along with Smash) in remastered form. This reissue was released on the same day as then-current album Rise and Fall, Rage and Grace.

== Touring and promotion ==
The Offspring toured for a-year-and-a-half to promote Ignition. Their audience continued to hone, supporting such bands as Youth Brigade, The Vandals, Bad Religion, D.I., Guttermouth, Voodoo Glow Skulls, Glue Gun, Momentum, Final Conflict, Face to Face, Pennywise, Rancid, Unwritten Law, RKL, Untrust, Cadillac Tramps and Korn. The Offspring then managed to secure a slot in three major tours in 1993. They opened for NOFX on their White Trash, Two Heebs and a Bean tour, and in that summer, the band supported Lunachicks and Iceburn. After the tour ended, The Offspring took a break and went back into the studio to record their third album Smash. In early 1994, The Offspring landed the opening slot for Pennywise on their Unknown Road tour. The Ignition tour ended on April 1, 1994, at the Shrine Auditorium in Los Angeles, just one week before the release of Smash.

== Track listing ==
All tracks are written by Dexter Holland, except "Session" (Holland, Jill Eckhaus, Kristine Luna) and "Nothing from Something" (Holland, Marvin Fergusen).

No.	Title	Length
1.	"Session"	2:32
2.	"We Are One"	4:00
3.	"Kick Him When He's Down"	3:16
4.	"Take It Like a Man"	2:55
5.	"Get It Right"	3:06
6.	"Dirty Magic"	3:48
7.	"Hypodermic"	3:21
8.	"Burn It Up"	2:42
9.	"No Hero"	3:22
10.	"L.A.P.D."	2:45
11.	"Nothing from Something"	3:00
12.	"Forever and a Day"	2:37
Total length:		37:23

== Certifications and sales ==
Region	Certification	Certified units/sales
Australia (ARIA)	Gold	35,000^{^}
Canada (Music Canada)	Gold	50,000^{^}
United States (RIAA)	Gold	500,000^{^}
Summaries
Worldwide	—	1,000,000
^{^} Shipments figures based on certification alone.

== Accolades ==
Publication (2011)	Rank
Guitar World Magazine's Top 10	2

== Personnel ==
=== The Offspring ===
- Dexter Holland – vocals, guitar (uncredited for guitar)
- Noodles – guitar
- Greg K. – bass
- Ron Welty – drums

=== Production ===
- Thom Wilson – production, mixing
- Ken Paulakovich – mixing
- Donnell Cameron and Joe Peccerillo – assistant engineer
- Eddie Schreyer – mastering
