= Smash (The Offspring album) =

1994 studio album by the Offspring

Studio album by the Offspring
- Released: April 8, 1994
- Recorded: January–February 1994
- Studios: Track Record, North Hollywood, California
- Genres: Punk rock; skate punk; pop-punk; melodic hardcore; grunge
- Length: 46:47
- Label: Epitaph
- Producer: Thom Wilson

The Offspring chronology
Ignition (1992)	Smash (1994)	Club Me (1997)

The Offspring studio chronology
Ignition (1992)	Smash (1994)	Ixnay on the Hombre (1997)

Singles from Smash
- 1. "Come Out and Play" Released: August 29, 1994; 2. "Self Esteem" Released: February 13, 1995; 3. "Gotta Get Away" Released: August 7, 1995

Smash is the third studio album by American rock band the Offspring, released on April 8, 1994, through Epitaph Records. After touring in support of their previous album Ignition (1992), the band recorded their next album for nearly two months at Track Record in North Hollywood, California. Smash was the band's final studio album to be produced by Thom Wilson, who had worked with them since their 1989 debut album The Offspring. Smash was put together on the spot in the studio and there was no systematic work behind the recording of the album.

The rise of grunge, especially Nirvana's successful release of Nevermind (1991), paved the way for American punk rock to reach a wider audience, with punk rock serving as an important base to the grunge sound. While Ignition had exceeded both the band's and the label's commercial expectations, it did not give the Offspring a major commercial breakthrough; Smash was the band's introduction into worldwide popularity. It produced a number of hit singles, including "Come Out and Play", "Self Esteem", and "Gotta Get Away". Along with Green Day's Dookie, Smash was responsible for bringing punk rock into the mainstream, and helped pave the way for the then-emerging pop punk scene of the 1990s.

As a fan favorite, the album received generally positive reviews from critics and garnered attention from major labels, including Columbia Records, with whom the band would sign in 1996. Peaking at number four on the US Billboard 200, Smash has sold over eleven million copies worldwide, making it the best-selling album released by an independent record label; it was also the first Epitaph release to obtain gold and platinum status. In the United States, Smash has sold over six million copies and has been certified six times platinum by the RIAA.

== Background and recording ==
In 1991, the Offspring released the Baghdad 7". This EP was the turning point for the band; due to its success the band signed with Epitaph Records. Thom Wilson, who produced the Offspring's first two albums, had been trying to get the Offspring to switch to Epitaph, a label run by Bad Religion guitarist Brett Gurewitz. Gurewitz felt that the Offspring was just not quite pronounced enough for his label, but Baghdad convinced him to give the band a shot. Wilson and the Offspring entered the studio again and recorded Ignition. Released in 1992, Ignition exceeded all of the label's and band's expectations. Following the subsequent touring to support Ignition, the Offspring began writing new material for their third album in mid-1993.

Smash was recorded in 20 days between January and February 1994 at Track Record in North Hollywood. On the recording process of the album, frontman Dexter Holland told Flux Magazine in 1994, "When we recorded this album, our last one has sold maybe 15,000 copies, so the possibility of us getting played on the radio or anything like that was pretty much nonexistent. Especially because this kind of music is not generally considered acceptable by the mainstream - so, for something like this to happen, it really took us by surprise."

Smash had a small budget of $20,000, which frequently restricted the band. According to guitarist Noodles, "[we] were constantly calling our studio to find out when it was empty just so we could sneak in at a discount price". Holland recalled "writing up to the last minute". The last four songs recorded for the album were worked on through just two nights.

== Writing and composition ==
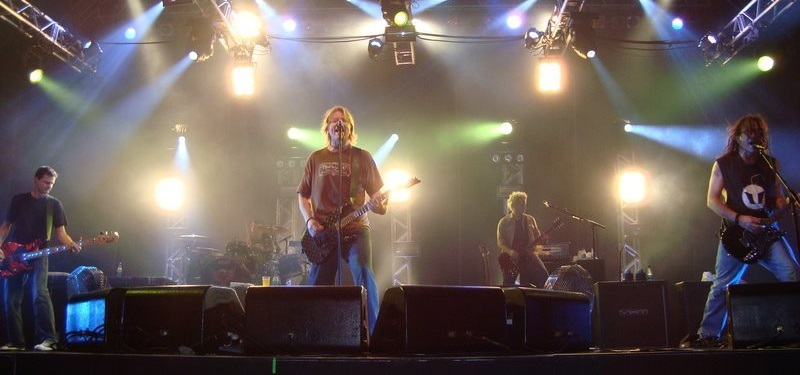
"Come Out and Play" and "Self Esteem" have been played at almost every live show.

Punk rock and pop-punk bands like Green Day and Rancid were gaining popularity, and riding on this wave of popularity, Smash's singles became radio rock hits. An example of this was the success of the Offspring's first major single release, "Come Out and Play", which reached No. 1 on Billboard Modern Rock Tracks chart.

The second single released from the album, "Self Esteem", became a radio hit, peaking at number 4 on the Billboard Modern Rock Tracks chart.

The third single, "Gotta Get Away" reached number 6 on the Billboard Modern Rock Tracks chart. Being the last song written for the album, the lyrics describe a point in Dexter's life when he was suffering from extreme pressure due to the then-upcoming deadline of the album. "What Happened To You" is driven by a Jamaican ska beat.

The only cover in the album was "Killboy Powerhead" by Didjits.

== Artwork ==
Smash, as well as the CD singles "Come Out and Play," "Self Esteem," and "Gotta Get Away" all share imagery of an X-ray style skeleton on their covers.

Smash, as well as the singles "Come Out and Play", "Self Esteem", and "Gotta Get Away" have a common artwork theme: an ominous (and highly distorted) skeleton on the cover, disc, and back of the CD case. The music videos for "Self Esteem" and "Come Out and Play" also have several scenes with a similar skeleton. This symbol is believed to represent the core motifs of the album: death, greed, suicide, violence, addiction, and abuse. The skeleton is used to represent that the continuation of these acts will inevitably lead to death (or alternatively, the end of the human species). The art direction is credited to Kevin Head and Fred Hidalgo, who also designed the artwork for the Bad Religion album Recipe for Hate.

== Release ==
=== Chart performance and sales ===
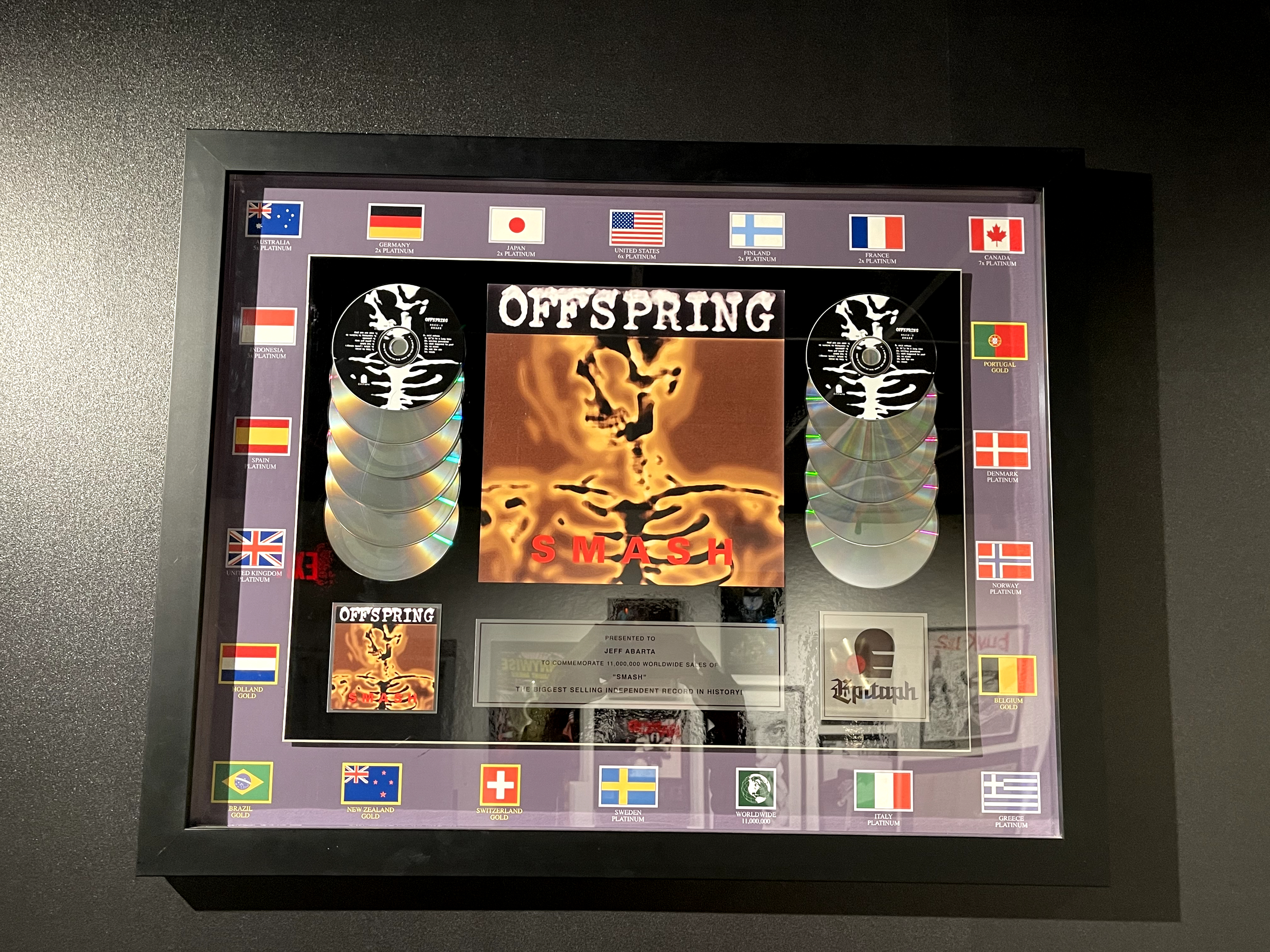
Worldwide sales plaque for the album "Smash" by The Offspring.

Despite obtaining early support from the Los Angeles modern rock radio station KROQ, Smash initially received little attention from radio and television stations. Despite this, the album shipped more than 50,000 units in its first week. On October 29, 1994, it peaked at number four on the Billboard 200, and since then, was in various places on the chart for 101 weeks. It also peaked at number one on the Heatseeker's Chart. On June 19, 1999, Smash peaked at number 12 on the Catalog Albums chart for one week.

Smash made history becoming the first album released on Epitaph Records to obtain gold and platinum status, and has been certified multi-platinum in three countries, including the US, Australia, and Canada. Additionally, it has achieved platinum status in Sweden and Switzerland, and gold status in Austria and Norway. Smash had sold over 11 million copies worldwide, with 6.3 million sales in the US according to Nielsen SoundScan and reported by Billboard in 2012. In France, it is the best selling album on an independent label, with 650,000 sales and 2× Platinum certification.

On July 30, 1994, "Come Out and Play", the album's first single, topped the Modern Rock Tracks, and stayed on the chart for 26 weeks. The song also charted at number 39 on the Pop Songs chart, while it reached number ten on the Mainstream Rock Tracks chart. "Self Esteem" reached number four on Modern Rock Tracks and would remain on that chart for 26 weeks, while it hit number seven on the Mainstream Rock Tracks chart. "Gotta Get Away", the album's third and last single, peaked at number six on the Modern Rock Tracks chart on January 14, 1995, where it would maintain some lower position on the chart for 20 weeks. Around the same time "Gotta Get Away" was officially chosen as the follow-up to "Self Esteem", "Bad Habit" was expected to be the third or fourth single from Smash when KROQ added it to its playlist and it became one of the radio station's most requested songs; however, no music video nor standard single was released to promote "Bad Habit". Still, although it was never released as a single, it became one of the most popular songs on the album, and gained recognition for the lyric which kept it off network television: "I feel like I'm God/You stupid dumbshit goddamn motherfucker".

=== Touring and promotion ===
The Offspring toured for more than two years to promote Smash. They began a two-month U.S. tour in May 1994, supporting such bands as SNFU, Battery Club and Pennywise, and then that summer, the band toured North America with Guttermouth and Big Drill Car, and Europe with Desaster Area. In the wake of the success of Smash, the Offspring was reportedly offered but turned down opening arena tours with bands like Stone Temple Pilots and Metallica (replacing Alice in Chains on the latter's summer 1994 U.S. tour), due to their desire to continue playing in clubs; Holland has been quoted as saying, "It just really didn't seem like the right thing to do. I still like the club thing, even if it's a big club. I like Stone Temple Pilots—it's not like we're saying we're too punk for that." The Offspring's next U.S. tour took place in October–November 1994, and was supported by Rancid, who were promoting their second album Let's Go. The band wrapped up the year with a European tour in November and a series of theater performances in December.

In January 1995, the Offspring embarked on their first tour of Japan and Australia, where they co-headlined Big Day Out with Ministry, Primal Scream, Hole, and the Cult. They toured the U.S. with Quicksand and No Use for a Name in February–March 1995, and then headlined a European tour, which was followed by another U.S. tour with the Vandals and Lunachicks, and another European tour in June–July. The Offspring took the rest of 1995 off before playing three shows in Southern California in December, and a one-off show in Orange, California with Rancid in April 1996. In August 1996, the band played its final dates of the Smash tour in Europe.

The Offspring embarked on a full-scale tour in the summer and fall of 2014 to commemorate the 20th anniversary of the release of Smash. On this tour, they played the Smash album in its entirety.

== Reception ==
=== Professional reviews ===
Professional ratings
Initial reviews (in 1994)
Review scores
Source	Rating
Chicago Tribune	3/4 stars
Entertainment Weekly	B−
Music Week	3/5 stars
NME	6/10
Rolling Stone	3/5 stars
Select	3/5

Professional ratings
Retrospective reviews (after 1994)
Review scores
Source	Rating
AllMusic	4.5/5 stars
The Great Rock Discography	7/10
The Rolling Stone Album Guide	4/5 stars
Spin Alternative Record Guide	7/10
Sputnikmusic	4/5

Critical reviews of Smash were mostly positive. Stephen Thomas Erlewine of AllMusic called it a "solid record, filled with enough heavy riffs to keep most teenagers happy". Erlewine praised the music as "relentlessly heavy". For the album, he claims that the Offspring had "crossed over", because of the success of its single "Come Out and Play", which "stopped and started just like Nirvana." Sputnikmusic reviewer Mike Stagno called it "a fun album to listen to." Robert Christgau was less favorable, giving the album a "neither" rating.

=== Legacy ===
Smash has inspired a number of musicians. During Trivium's early days, guitarist Matt Heafy performed a cover version of "Self Esteem" at his middle school talent show at Lake Brantley High School, while the British synthpop group Cuban Boys also covered that song on their only full-length album Eastwood. The album's other hit, "Come Out and Play", was covered by Richard Cheese on his 2000 album, Lounge Against the Machine and again released on the 2006 best-of album The Sunny Side of the Moon. Brett Gurewitz, the guitarist of Bad Religion and president of Epitaph, had also mentioned that he liked Smash and described it as "a very good record".

Along with Green Day's Dookie, Smash was among the most commercially successful punk rock albums released in 1994, a year when the genre reached arguably its greatest popularity. By the end of the year, Dookie and Smash had both sold millions of copies. The commercial success of these two albums attracted major label interest in punk rock, with bands such as Rancid, NOFX and Pennywise, all of whom had been labelmates with the Offspring at the time, being offered lucrative contracts to leave their independent record labels, though this offer was rejected. As Ian Cohen of Stylus Magazine reflected:

"...the success of Smash was still a heartening triumph of DIY. Before the creation of the mp3 blog and Lil' Jon blurring the lines in terms of what an independent label actually is, Smash destroyed the record for albums sold on an indie, despite nonexistent promotion and videos with A/V Club production values."

Smash has been listed on several publications' best album lists. In November 2011, the album was ranked number two on Guitar World magazine's top ten list of guitar albums of 1994, between Bad Religion's Stranger than Fiction and Weezer's Weezer. Guitar World also ranked Smash at number 31 in their "Superunknown: 50 Iconic Albums That Defined 1994" list. Although the Offspring is a punk rock band, Loudwire placed Smash at No. 4 on its "10 Best Hard Rock Albums of 1994" list. The album was included at number 6 on Rock Sound's "The 51 Most Essential Pop Punk Albums of All Time" list. NME listed the album as one of "20 Pop Punk Albums Which Will Make You Nostalgic".

== Reissues ==
Smash has been reissued at least twice. Remastered issues of Ignition and Smash were released on June 17, 2008, the same day as the Offspring's eighth studio album Rise and Fall, Rage and Grace. On April 8, 2014, the 20th anniversary of its original release, the Offspring announced that they would be releasing a special edition of Smash in mid-August on Epitaph. It was released as a special package that contained the remastered album on both CD and vinyl, restyled artwork, and a large format 24-page booklet containing never-before seen photos. The reissue was also released as a box set; it came with an art print (the first 250 of which are signed and on linen), a live photo print, tour pass replica and 20th anniversary items, including a pin, patch and guitar pick. The band toured in support of the reissue.

== Track listing ==
All tracks are written by Dexter Holland, except where noted. These tracks are as they appeared on the CD release. Audio cassette versions did not include spoken word interludes (eg., Time to Relax).

No.	Title	Length
1.	"Time to Relax" (Intro - not included on audio cassette release)	0:25
2.	"Nitro [Youth Energy]"	2:27
3.	"Bad Habit"	3:43
4.	"Gotta Get Away"	3:52
5.	"Genocide" (Followed by spoken word)	3:33
6.	"Something to Believe In"	3:17
7.	"Come Out and Play" ("Come Out and Play (Keep 'Em Separated)" on the remastered edition)	3:17
8.	"Self Esteem"	4:17
9.	"It'll Be a Long Time"	2:43
10.	"Killboy Powerhead" (Didjits cover)	2:02
11.	"What Happened to You?"	2:12
12.	"So Alone"	1:17
13.	"Not the One"	2:54
14.	"Smash"	10:42
Total length:		46:47

- "Smash" ends at 2:52. It is immediately followed by spoken word, then followed by "Genocide (Reprise)", in which the same riff and drum beat can be heard on "Change the World" from the band's next album. This ends at 4:09, followed by silence until 9:00, where the hidden track "Come Out and Play (Acoustic Reprise)" begins.

== Charts ==
=== Weekly charts ===
Weekly chart performance for Smash
Chart (1994–1995)	Peak position
Australian Albums (ARIA)	1
Australian Alternative Albums (ARIA)	1
Austrian Albums (Ö3 Austria)	2
Belgian Albums (Ultratop Flanders)	2
Belgian Albums (Ultratop Wallonia)	2
Canada Top Albums/CDs (RPM)	5
Danish Albums (Hitlisten)	6
Dutch Albums (Album Top 100)	5
Estonia Top CD Albums (Eesti Top 10)	3
European Albums (European Top 100 Albums)	3
Finnish Albums (Suomen virallinen lista)	2
French Albums (SNEP)	4
German Albums (Offizielle Top 100)	4
Hungarian Albums (MAHASZ)	18
Icelandic Albums (Tónlist)	1
New Zealand Albums (RMNZ)	6
Norwegian Albums (VG-lista)	9
Scottish Albums (Official Charts)	50
Spanish Albums (AFYVE)	17
Swedish Albums (Sverigetopplistan)	3
Swiss Albums (Schweizer Hitparade)	3
UK Albums (Official Charts)	21
UK Rock & Metal Albums (Official Charts)	1
US Billboard 200	4
US Heatseekers Albums (Billboard)	1
Chart (1999)	Peak position
UK Independent Albums (Official Charts)	17
US Top Catalog Albums (Billboard)	12

2001 chart performance for Smash
Chart (2001)	Peak position
French Albums (SNEP)	108

=== Year-end charts ===
1994 year-end chart performance for Smash
Chart (1994)	Position
Australian Albums (ARIA)	52
Canada Top Albums/CDs (RPM)	44
US Billboard 200	37

1995 year-end chart performance for Smash
Chart (1995)	Position
Australian Albums (ARIA)	11
Austrian Albums (Ö3 Austria)	2
Belgian Albums (Ultratop Flanders)	11
Belgian Albums (Ultratop Wallonia)	5
Canada Top Albums/CDs (RPM)	4
Dutch Albums (Album Top 100)	18
European Albums (European Top 100 Albums)	5
German Albums (Offizielle Top 100)	9
New Zealand Albums (RMNZ)	12
Spanish Albums (AFYVE)	42
Swedish Albums (Sverigetopplistan)	28
Swiss Albums (Schweizer Hitparade)	6
UK Albums (OCC)	75
US Billboard 200	11

=== Decade-end charts ===
1990s decade-end chart performance for Smash
Chart (1990–1999)	Position
US Billboard 200	56

== Certifications and sales ==
Region	Certification	Certified units/sales
Australia (ARIA)	4× Platinum	280,000^{^}
Austria (IFPI Austria)	Gold	25,000^{*}
Belgium (BRMA)	Platinum	50,000^{*}
Canada (Music Canada)	6× Platinum	600,000^{^}
Finland	—	74,500
France	—	650,000
Japan (RIAJ)	Platinum	200,000^{^}
Netherlands	—	50,000
New Zealand (RMNZ)	Platinum	15,000^{^}
Norway (IFPI Norway)	Gold	25,000^{*}
Sweden (GLF)	Platinum	100,000^{^}
Switzerland (IFPI Switzerland)	Platinum	50,000^{^}
United Kingdom (BPI)	Platinum	300,000^{*}
United States (RIAA)	6× Platinum	6,000,000^{^} / 6,300,000
Summaries
Europe (IFPI)	2× Platinum	2,000,000^{*}
Worldwide	—	11,000,000
^{*} Sales figures based on certification alone.^{^} Shipments figures based on certification alone.

== Personnel ==
=== The Offspring ===
- Dexter Holland – vocals, guitar
- Noodles – guitar, backing vocals
- Greg K. – bass
- Ron Welty – drums, backing vocals

=== Additional musicians ===
- Jason "Blackball" McLean – additional vocals on "Come Out and Play (Keep 'Em Separated)" (uncredited, but mentioned on Greatest Hits)
- John Mayer – spoken word on "Time to Relax", "Genocide" and "Smash" (uncredited)

=== Production ===
- Thom Wilson – producer, engineer
- Ken Paulakovich – engineer
- Eddy Schreyer – mastering
- Mike Ainsworth – assistant engineer
- Ulysses Noriega –assistant engineer
- Christopher C. Murphy – assistant engineer/runner
- Fred Hidalgo – art direction
- Lisa Johnson – photography

== Release history ==
Year	Type	Edition	Label	Catalog	Ref
1994	CD	—	Epitaph	86432	
1994	LP	—	Epitaph	86432	
1994	CS	—	Epitaph	86432	
1994	CD	Australian version	Shock Records	86432	
1994	CD	Brazilian version	Epitaph/Paradoxx Music	OXX 1127	
1996	CS	Russian version (Unofficial Release)	Global Music	?	
2008	CD	Remastered version	Epitaph	86868	
2008	LP	Remastered version (translucent orange vinyl); came with a coupon for a free MP3 download	Epitaph	86868	
"—" denotes that it was a standard release.

== See also ==
- List of best-selling albums in the United States
