= Nemesis Records =

American independent record label

- Founded: 1988
- Founder: Frank Harrison
- Defunct: 1993
- Status: Defunct
- Distributor(s): Cargo
- Genre: Hardcore punk, punk rock
- Country of origin: U.S.
- Location: Long Beach, California

Nemesis Records was an American independent record label which released the Offspring's debut studio album, The Offspring, in 1989 as well as their 1991 EP Baghdad. Nemesis was founded by Frank Harrison, distributed by Cargo Records from Canada and closed in 1993.

== Artists ==
- A Chorus of Disapproval
- Against The Wall
- Bloodline
- Bonesaw
- Billingsgate
- Brujeria
- B'zrker
- Chicano-Christ
- The Chorus
- Crankshaft
- Curious George
- Downside
- Face Value
- Final Conflict
- Fishwife
- Gameface
- Haywire
- Hunger Farm
- Insted
- Intent To Injure
- Left Insane
- The Offspring
- Olivelawn
- Once And For All
- One Step Ahead
- Our Band Sucks
- Pitchfork
- Point Blank
- Reason To Believe
- Schleprock
- Smile
- Toetag
- Uniform Choice
- Vision
- Visual Discrimination
- Walk Proud
