= Greg K. =

American bassist (born 1965)

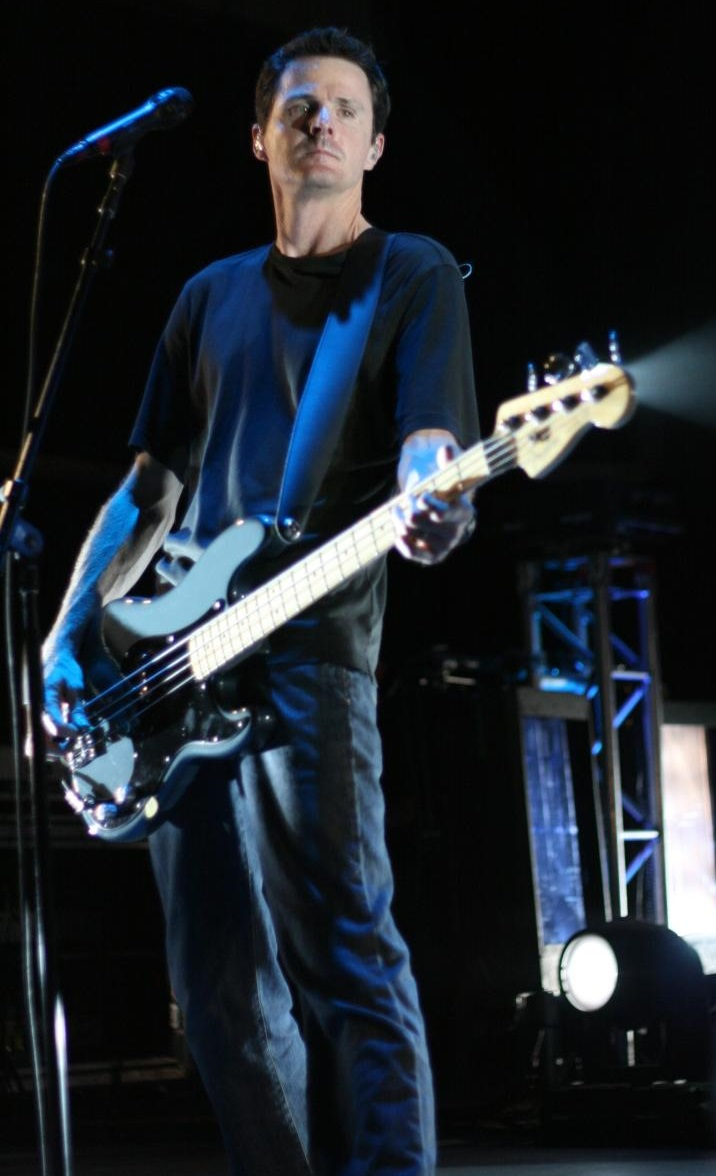
- Greg K. performing in 2009

Background information
- Born: Gregory David Kriesel; January 20, 1965 (age 61); Glendale, California, U.S.
- Genres: Punk rock; skate punk
- Occupation: Bassist
- Years active: 1984–2018
- Labels: Columbia; Black Label; Nemesis; Epitaph; Nitro; Time Bomb
- Formerly of: The Offspring

Gregory David Kriesel (born January 20, 1965) known by his stagename Greg K., is a retired American musician and the founding bassist of the rock band the Offspring. He is also the co-founder (along with bandmate Dexter Holland) of the record label Nitro Records.

== Career ==
In 1984 Kriesel formed the band alongside friend and cross-country teammate Dexter Holland after the duo failed to participate in a Social Distortion concert. The duo hired James Lilja as their drummer and after a year Noodles joined as guitarist, Manic Subsidal changed their name to the Offspring in 1986. After drummer Ron Welty joined the band in 1987 to replace James Lilja, the band started recording their debut album in 1989.

After recording a demo in 1988, the Offspring signed a deal with a small-time label, Nemesis Records, for whom they recorded their first full-length album, The Offspring, in March 1989. This album would eventually be re-issued in 1995, by Kriesel and Holland's own record label, Nitro Records.

In 1991, the Offspring signed with Epitaph Records (home of Bad Religion, L7, NOFX, Pennywise and other similar bands). Their first release on the label was Ignition, which was released in 1992. Their last album for that label was 1994's Smash, which still holds the world record for most sales of an album on an independent label. The band then signed with Columbia Records in 1996 (after Brett Gurewitz, owner of Epitaph and guitarist for Bad Religion, sold the contract to Columbia) for whom they released their next six albums, Ixnay on the Hombre (1997), Americana (1998), Conspiracy of One (2000), Splinter (2003), Rise and Fall, Rage and Grace (2008) and Days Go By (2012). Kriesel was fired from The Offspring on November 11, 2018.

=== Lawsuit ===
In August 2019, Kriesel filed a lawsuit against his two former Offspring bandmates, Dexter Holland and Kevin "Noodles" Wasserman, following an alleged decision by the two in November 2018 to fire Kriesel from the Offspring and exclude him from band related activities such as studio recordings and live performances. Kriesel and his lawyers also alleged that the two conspired to "seize the business, business opportunities, and assets" of Kriesel's stake in the band without compensation. As the result of his absence from touring, he had been filled in by Tony Kanal of No Doubt, with the Offspring’s touring guitarist Todd Morse later becoming Kriesel's official replacement. Holland and Wasserman later sued Kriesel back, stating that "Kriesel's arguments have no basis in fact" and that "there could be no such thing as an oral, permanent partnership, or a partnership which required two people to perform in perpetuity". Holland and Wasserman also claimed that Kriesel apparently was asked and agreed to leave the band after "differences developed between how both parties viewed the band's present and future." They further claimed that they attempted to "negotiate in good faith" to purchase his shares in the band and present him his part of the band's assets and those assets included the Offspring trademark and various royalty payments. Kriesel allegedly refused that deal, suing the band instead. The case was settled out of court in 2023.
