= Dexter Holland =

American rock musician (born 1965)

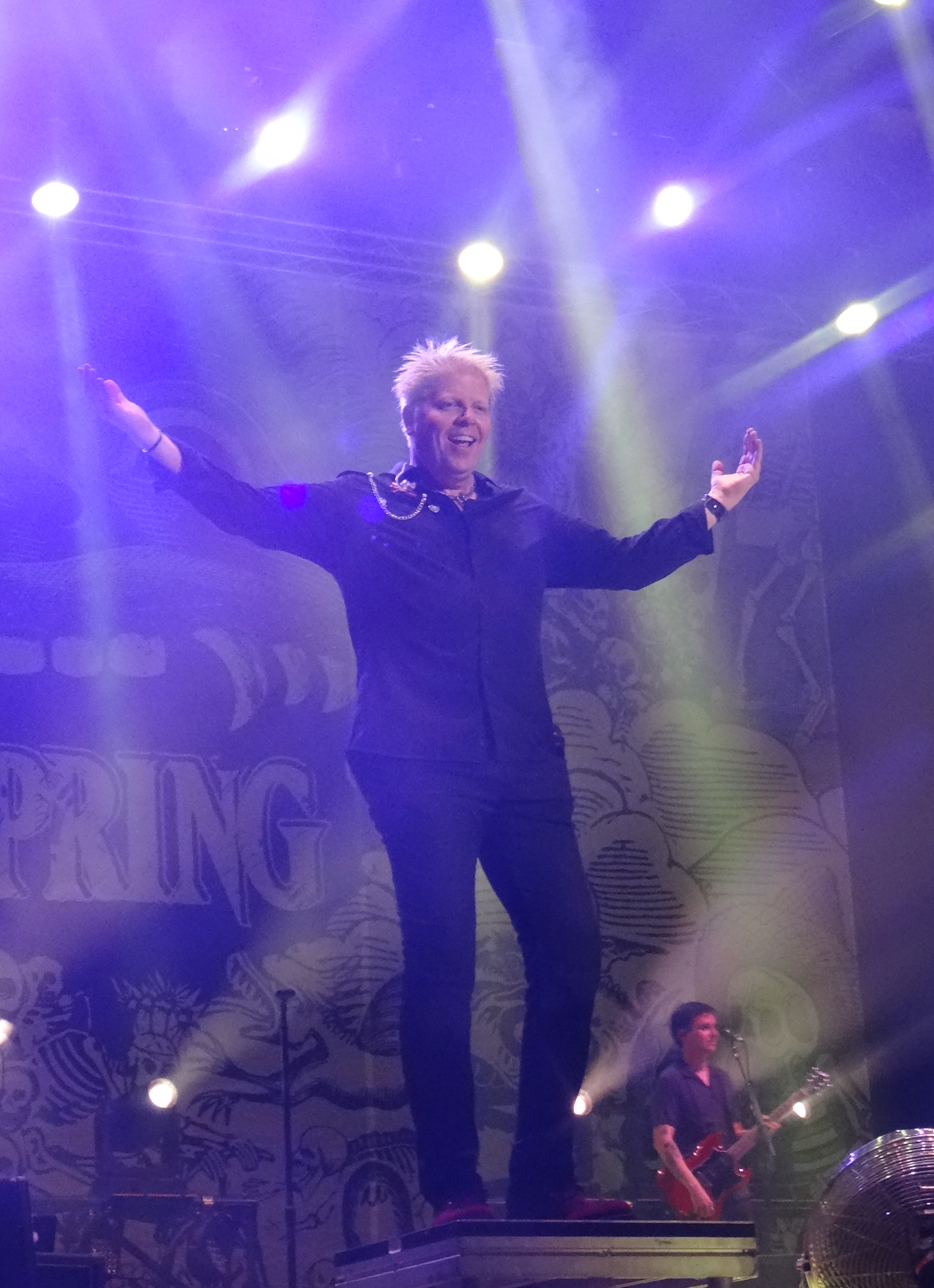
- Holland in 2017
- Born: Bryan Keith Holland; December 29, 1965 (age 60); Garden Grove, California, U.S.
- Occupations: Musician; singer; songwriter; virologist; businessman
- Years active: 1984–present
- Partners: Kristine Luna (m. 1995; div. 2012); Amber Sasse (m. 2013)
- Children: 3, including Alexa
- Musical career
- Genres: Punk rock; skate punk; pop-punk; ska punk; alternative rock
- Instruments: Vocals; guitar
- Labels: Columbia; Black Label; Nemesis; Epitaph; Nitro; Time Bomb; Concord
- Member of: The Offspring
- Website: offspring.com

Bryan Keith "Dexter" Holland (born December 29, 1965) is an American musician. He is the co-founder, lead vocalist, rhythm guitarist, main songwriter, and only constant member of the punk rock band the Offspring. He co-founded the record label Nitro Records, sold in 2013, with former bandmate Greg K. and also holds a PhD in molecular biology.

== Early life ==
Bryan Keith Holland was born in Garden Grove, California, on December 29, 1965. He attended Pacifica High School in Garden Grove, graduating as class valedictorian in 1984. He was the best student in his year at mathematics, which he found "just as exciting as punk rock". He acquired the nickname "Dexter" for his academic prowess, taken from the slang term "Poindexter".

Holland attended the University of Southern California, where he earned a B.S. in biology and an M.S. in molecular biology. He suspended his studies to focus on music when the Offspring found success in 1994, but later resumed and earned a PhD in molecular biology in May 2017. He defended his thesis, "Discovery of mature microRNA sequences within the protein-coding regions of global HIV-1 genomes: predictions of novel mechanisms for viral infection and pathogenicity", under doctoral advisors Suraiya Rasheed and Bob Baker.

== Career ==
=== Music ===
Holland started a punk band named Manic Subsidal in 1984 with his friend and cross-country teammate Greg "K." Kriesel. Holland played the drums. The band was formed when they failed to get into a Social Distortion concert. After James Lilja was hired as their drummer, Holland switched to vocals and guitars. Kevin "Noodles" Wasserman then joined on guitar, and Manic Subsidal changed their name to the Offspring in 1986. After recording a demo in 1988, the Offspring signed a deal with a small-time independent record label, Nemesis Records, for whom they recorded their first full-length album, The Offspring, in March 1989. This album would eventually be re-issued in 1995, by Holland's own record label, Nitro Records.

In 1991, the Offspring signed with Epitaph Records (home of Bad Religion, L7, NOFX, Pennywise and other similar bands). Their first release on the label was Ignition, which was released in 1992. Their last album for that label was 1994's Smash, which still holds the world record for most sales of an album on an independent label. The band then signed with Columbia Records in 1996 (after Brett Gurewitz, owner of Epitaph and guitarist for Bad Religion, sold the contract to Columbia, Holland claims) for whom they released their next six albums, Ixnay on the Hombre (1997), Americana (1998), Conspiracy of One (2000), Splinter (2003), Rise and Fall, Rage and Grace (2008) and Days Go By (2012). The albums Let The Bad Times Roll (2021) and Supercharged (2024) were released on Concord Records. Holland is one of the two members (along with Noodles) to appear on all of The Offspring's albums, and as of Greg K.'s split from the band in November 2018, he is the only remaining original member.

Holland sometimes plays the piano during live shows. Occasionally the band plays "Gone Away", with only Holland playing the song on piano. Holland sings in the tenor range.

He is also one of the co-founders of the record label Nitro Records, which he operated from 1994 to 2013, along with former bandmate Greg K.

=== Science ===
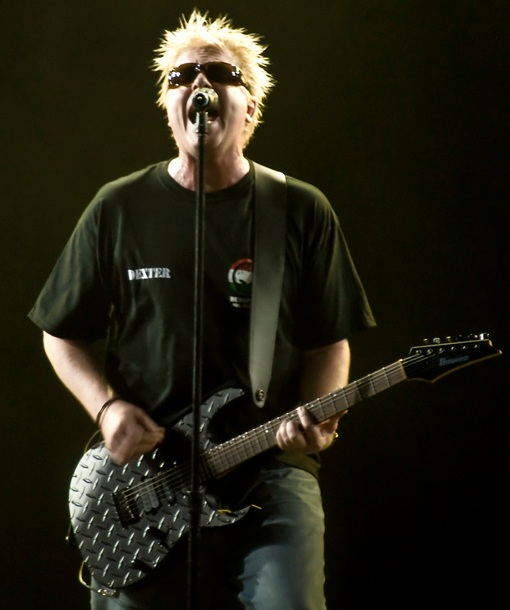
Holland performing in 2009

In a 1995 interview, Holland said that he would rather be a professor at a university than play music by the time he turns 40.

Holland was a doctoral student at the Laboratory of Viral Oncology and Proteomics Research, Keck School of Medicine, where he was supervised by Professor Suraiya Rasheed. In March 2013, Holland and co-authors published a paper in PLoS One regarding microRNA in HIV genomes, titled "Identification of Human MicroRNA-Like Sequences Embedded within the Protein-Encoding Genes of the Human Immunodeficiency Virus". The original academic paper describes the use of computational molecular biological (in silico) approaches to identify microRNA-like sequences in HIV. These sequences are suggested to have evolved to self-regulate survival of the virus in the host by evading its immune responses and thus influence the persistence, replication, and pathogenicity of HIV. Holland was awarded his Ph.D. in molecular biology during the USC Commencement on May 12, 2017.

=== Business ===
In 2004, Holland launched his own brand of hot sauce called Gringo Bandito. The label depicts Holland with bandoliers, revolvers, a sombrero and shades, a design that OC Weekly magazine described as parodying the logo for Tapatío hot sauce or Pancho Villa. Holland, who grew up in Southern California where Mexican cuisine is considered a "part of the way of life", wondered "if [he] could do [a hot sauce] better".

On the conception of the hot sauce, Holland states that in the early 2000s, while eating Mexican food, he began to read the label of a bottle of Tapatío; "It just clicked that I had to make one. People who like hot sauce are a certain type of people. They're passionate. They'll have a bottle with them wherever they go. I'm one of those people. And when I'm into something, I really get into it. It's like my music—I liked records, so I learned how to play a guitar. After that? A band."

It has sold over a million bottles and is available in over 500 restaurants and 7,000 stores.

The headquarters for Gringo Bandito are located in a Huntington Beach industrial park, next to the Offspring's recording studio.

== Philanthropy ==
In 1997, Holland and former Dead Kennedys singer Jello Biafra teamed up to form the FSU Foundation, which raised funds through charity concerts. The foundation organized benefit shows to raise money for various charities including AIDS Project Los Angeles, Poor People's United Fund, Trees Foundation, and Amnesty International.

Holland participated in the Los Angeles Marathon in 2006 and 2008 with his charity of choice being the Innocence Project, a non-profit legal clinic that handles legal cases where post-conviction DNA testing can yield conclusive proof of innocence.

== Artistry ==
Holland's early musical influences include Aerosmith, the Beatles, the Sex Pistols, the Ramones, Kiss, Bob Marley, Queen, and the Rolling Stones.

All of Holland's Ibanez RG body guitars are made out of mahogany and fitted with DiMarzio Super Distortion bridge pickups. During their latest recordings, Holland used a vintage Gibson SG Junior. He plays through a Mesa/Boogie Dual Rectifier.

== Personal life ==
Holland met hair stylist Kristine Luna in 1992, and they were married in 1995. She co-wrote the Offspring song "Session" and appeared in the music video for "I Choose". They divorced in 2012. He married Amber Sasse in 2013. His daughter from a previous relationship, Alexa (born 1986), is also a musician and goes by the stage name Lex Land. Holland also has two children from his current marriage.

A licensed aircraft pilot, Holland completed a 10-day solo flight around the world in November 2004. He also enjoys surfing and collecting postage stamps from the Isle of Man.

== Discography ==
=== The Offspring ===
All Offspring albums. For a complete list, see the Offspring discography.

- The Offspring (1989)
- Ignition (1992)
- Smash (1994)
- Ixnay on the Hombre (1997)
- Americana (1998)
- Conspiracy of One (2000)
- Splinter (2003)
- Rise and Fall, Rage and Grace (2008)
- Days Go By (2012)
- Let the Bad Times Roll (2021)
- Supercharged (2024)

=== Guest appearances ===
- The Vandals – Hitler Bad, Vandals Good (1998) (co-wrote "Too Much Drama")
- AFI – Black Sails in the Sunset (1999) (Backing vocals on "Clove Smoke Catharsis", "The Prayer Position" and "God Called in Sick Today")
- The Aquabats – The Aquabats vs. the Floating Eye of Death! (1999) (co-wrote "Amino Man!")
- The Vandals – Look What I Almost Stepped In... (2000) (co-wrote "Jackass" and does backing vocals on that song)
- Dwarves – The Dwarves Must Die (2004) (Backing vocals on "Salt Lake City" and "Massacre")
- Puffy AmiYumi – Splurge (2006) (co-wrote "Tokyo I'm on My Way")
- Ron Emory – Walk That Walk (2010) (backing vocals on "I'm Not Alone")
- Dwarves – The Dwarves Are Born Again (2011) (Backing vocals on "Looking Out for Number One" and "Happy Birthday Suicide")
- Dwarves – The Dwarves Invented Rock & Roll (2014) (backing vocals)
- Dwarves – Take Back the Night (2018) (sings on "Julio")
- Mötley Crüe – Cancelled (2024) (backing vocals)

Holland has also made cameo appearances in:

- Idle Hands (Movie, 1999) as Band lead singer (with The Offspring)
- Pauly Shore Is Dead (Movie, 2003) as Gas Station Guy
- Punk's Not Dead (Documentary, 2007) as himself
- One Nine Nine Four (Documentary, 2009) as himself
- The Damned: Don't You Wish That We Were Dead (Documentary, 2015) as himself
- The Last Sharknado: It's About Time (Movie, 2018) as British Captain

== Publications ==
- Holland, Bryan (2017). Discovery of mature microRNA sequences within the protein-coding regions of global HIV-1 genomes: predictions of novel mechanisms for viral infection and pathogenicity (Thesis). Los Angeles, California: University of Southern California. ProQuest 2071314868.

== See also ==
- List of artists and entertainers with advanced degrees
