= List of songs recorded by the Offspring =

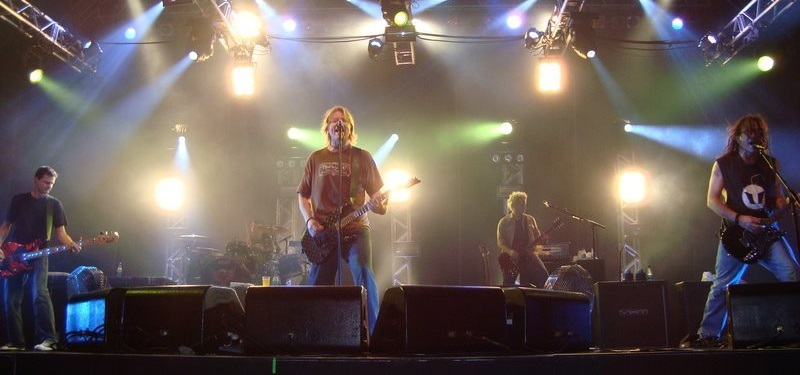
The Offspring in 2008

This is an incomplete list of songs released by American punk rock group the Offspring in alphabetical order. The list includes tracks from each of the Offspring's studio albums The Offspring (1989), Ignition (1992), Smash (1994), Ixnay on the Hombre (1997), Americana (1998), Conspiracy of One (2000), Splinter (2003), Rise and Fall, Rage and Grace (2008), Days Go By (2012), Let the Bad Times Roll (2021) and Supercharged (2024). It also includes the tracks from the compilation albums Greatest Hits (2005) and Happy Hour! (2010), as well as the two EPs Baghdad (1991) and Club Me (1997) and tracks that the band had recorded prior to 1989. Bonus tracks from studio albums, B-sides and tracks from various artists compilation albums and soundtracks are also listed here.

| Song | Release | Year | Writer(s) | Producer | Notes |
|---|---|---|---|---|---|
| "52 Girls" | Contains No Caffeine compilation | 1991 | Ricky Wilson, Jeremy Ayers | LOB | Track B18 (cassette only) |
| "80 Times" | Conspiracy of One | 2000 | T.S.O.L. | Brendan O'Brien | Track 14 (vinyl-only bonus track) |
| "All Along" | Conspiracy of One | 2000 | Dexter Holland | Brendan O'Brien | Track 10 |
| "All I Have Left Is You" | Days Go By | 2012 | Dexter Holland | Bob Rock | Track 7 |
| "All I Want" | Ixnay on the Hombre | 1997 | Dexter Holland | Dave Jerden | Track 10 |
| "Amazed" | Ixnay on the Hombre | 1997 | Dexter Holland | Dave Jerden | Track 13 |
| "Americana" | Americana | 1998 | Dexter Holland | Dave Jerden | Track 12 |
| "Army of One" | Let the Bad Times Roll | 2021 | Dexter Holland | Bob Rock | Track 4 |
| "A Thousand Days" | The Offspring | 1989 | Dexter Holland | Dexter Holland | Track 8 |
| "Autonomy" | Want You Bad Single | 2000 | Steve Diggle | Brendan O'Brien | Track 4; Buzzcocks cover |
| "Bad Habit" | Smash | 1994 | Dexter Holland | Thom Wilson | Track 3 |
| "Baghdad" | Baghdad | 1991 | Dexter Holland | Thom Wilson | Track 3 |
| "Ballroom Blitz" | 5 Songs demo | 1986 | Sweet | N/A | Track 4 |
| "Beheaded" | The Offspring | 1989 | Dexter Holland, James Lilja | Thom Wilson | Track 6 |
| "Beheaded (1999)" | Why Don't You Get A Job Single | 1999 | Dexter Holland, James Lilja | Dave Jerden | Track 2 |
| "Bells Will Be Ringing (Please Come Home For Christmas)" | Bells Will Be Ringing (Please Come Home For Christmas) | 2022 | Charles Brown | Bob Rock | Single |
| "Behind Your Walls" | Let the Bad Times Roll | 2021 | Dexter Holland | Bob Rock | Track 3 |
| "Behind Your Walls (acoustic)" | Behind Your Walls Single | 2022 | Dexter Holland | Bob Rock | Track 2 |
| "Blackball" | I'll Be Waiting Single | 1986 | Dexter Holland | The Offspring, Jim Dotson | Track 2 |
| "Blackball" | The Offspring | 1989 | Dexter Holland | Thom Wilson | Track 9 |
| "Bloodstains" | Ready to Rumble Soundtrack | 2000 | Michael Palm | Butch Vig | Track 1; Agent Orange cover |
| "The Blurb" | Baghdad | 1991 | Dexter Holland | Thom Wilson | Track 4 |
| "Breaking These Bones" | Let the Bad Times Roll | 2021 | Dexter Holland | Bob Rock | Track 5 |
| "Burn It Up" | Ignition | 1992 | Dexter Holland | Thom Wilson | Track 8 |
| "Call It Religion" | 5 songs demo | 1986 | Dexter Holland | N/A | Track 5 |
| "(Can't Get My) Head Around You" | Splinter | 2003 | Dexter Holland | Brendan O'Brien | Track 6 |
| "Can't Repeat" | Greatest Hits | 2005 | Dexter Holland | Jerry Finn | Track 1 |
| "Change the World" | Ixnay on the Hombre | 1997 | Dexter Holland | Dave Jerden | Track 14 |
| "Christmas (Baby Please Come Home" | Christmas (Baby Please Come Home) | 2020 | Jeff Barry; Ellie Greenwich; Phil Spector | Bob Rock | Single |
| "Come Out and Play" | Smash | 1994 | Dexter Holland | Thom Wilson | Track 7 |
| "Come Out Swinging" | Conspiracy of One | 2000 | Dexter Holland | Brendan O'Brien | Track 2 |
| "Coming for You" | Coming for You | 2015 | Dexter Holland | Bob Rock | Single |
| "Coming for You" | Let the Bad Times Roll | 2021 | Dexter Holland | Bob Rock | Track 6 |
| "Conspiracy of One" | Conspiracy of One | 2000 | Dexter Holland | Brendan O'Brien | Track 13 |
| "Come To Brazil" | Supercharged | 2024 | Dexter Holland | Bob Rock | Track 7 |
| "Cool to Hate" | Ixnay on the Hombre | 1997 | Dexter Holland | Dave Jerden | Track 5 |
| "Crossroads" | The Offspring | 1989 | Dexter Holland | Thom Wilson | Track 4 |
| "Cruising California (Bumpin' in My Trunk)" | Days Go By | 2012 | Dexter Holland | Bob Rock | Track 6 |
| "Da Hui" | Splinter | 2003 | Dexter Holland | Brendan O'Brien | Track 11 |
| "Dammit, I Changed Again" | Conspiracy of One | 2000 | Dexter Holland | Brendan O'Brien | Track 6 |
| "Days Go By" | Days Go By | 2012 | Dexter Holland | Bob Rock | Track 3 |
| "Days Go By (You Will Find a Way)" | Unreleased | 2012 | Dexter Holland | Bob Rock | Unreleased; title changed to Days Go By |
| "Defy You" | Orange County Soundtrack | 2001 | Dexter Holland | Brendan O'Brien | Track 1 |
| "Demons" | The Offspring | 1989 | Dexter Holland | Thom Wilson | Track 5 |
| "Denial, Revisited" | Conspiracy of One | 2000 | Dexter Holland | Brendan O'Brien | Track 11 |
| "Dirty Magic" | Ignition | 1992 | Dexter Holland | Thom Wilson | Track 6. Original version. |
| "Dirty Magic" | Days Go By | 2012 | Dexter Holland | Bob Rock | Track 9. Re-recorded version; originally from Ignition. |
| "Disclaimer" | Ixnay on the Hombre | 1997 | Dexter Holland | Dave Jerden | Track 1 |
| "Dividing by Zero" | Days Go By | 2012 | Dexter Holland | Bob Rock | Track 11 |
| "Do What You Want" | Summer Nationals | 2014 | Brett Gurewitz | Bob Rock | Track 1 |
| "Don't Pick It Up" | Ixnay on the Hombre | 1997 | Dexter Holland | Dave Jerden | Track 12 |
| "Down" | Down | 2018 | Nick Hexum, S.A. Martinez | Bob Rock | Single |
| "D.U.I." | I Know What You Did Last Summer | 1997 | Dexter Holland | Dave Jerden | Track 3 |
| "Elders" | The Offspring | 1989 | Dexter Holland | Thom Wilson | Track 2 |
| "The End of the Line" | Americana | 1998 | Dexter Holland | Dave Jerden | Track 9 |
| "The Fall Guy" | Supercharged | 2024 | Dexter Holland | Bob Rock | Track 3 |
| "Feelings" | Americana | 1998 | Morris Albert | Dave Jerden | Track 6 |
| "Fire and Ice" | 5 songs demo | 1986 | Dexter Holland | N/A | Track 2; Later changed to "I'll Be Waiting" |
| "Fix You" | Rise and Fall, Rage and Grace | 2008 | Dexter Holland | Bob Rock | Track 10 |
| "Forever and a Day" | Ignition | 1992 | Dexter Holland | Thom Wilson | Track 12 |
| "The Future Is Now" | Days Go By | 2012 | Dexter Holland | Bob Rock | Track 1 |
| "Genocide" | Smash | 1994 | Dexter Holland | Thom Wilson | Track 5 |
| "Get It Right" | Ignition | 1992 | Dexter Holland | Thom Wilson | Track 5. Re-recorded version. |
| "Get Some" | Supercharged | 2024 | Dexter Holland | Bob Rock | Track 8 |
| "Gone Away" | Ixnay on the Hombre | 1997 | Dexter Holland | Dave Jerden | Track 7. Original version. |
| "Gone Away" | Let the Bad Times Roll | 2021 | Dexter Holland | Bob Rock | Track 11. Re-recorded version; originally from Ixnay on the Hombre. |
| "Gotta Get Away" | Smash | 1994 | Dexter Holland | Thom Wilson | Track 4 |
| "Guerre Sous Couvertures" | Let the Bad Times Roll | 2021 | Dexter Holland | Bob Rock | Track 13 Japanese bonus track. |
| "Half-Truism" | Rise and Fall, Rage and Grace | 2008 | Dexter Holland | Bob Rock | Track 1 |
| "Halloween" | 5 songs demo | 1986 | Dexter Holland | N/A | Track 1 |
| "Hammerhead" | Rise and Fall, Rage and Grace | 2008 | Dexter Holland | Bob Rock | Track 4 |
| "Hand Grenades" | Short Music for Short People | 1999 | Dexter Holland | Dave Jerden | Track 45 |
| "Hanging By A Thread" | Supercharged | 2024 | Dexter Holland | Bob Rock | Track 9 |
| "Hassan Chop" | Let the Bad Times Roll | 2021 | Dexter Holland | Bob Rock | Track 10 |
| "Have You Ever" | Americana | 1998 | Dexter Holland | Dave Jerden | Track 2 |
| "Hey Joe" | Baghdad | 1991 | Billy Roberts | Thom Wilson | Track 2 |
| "Hey Joe" | The Offspring | 1989 | Billy Roberts | Thom Wilson | Track 12 (cassette-only bonus track) |
| "Hey Kitty Kitty" | Released on YouTube | 2020 | Clinton Johnson Band | Bob Rock | Clinton Johnson Band cover |
| "Hit That" | Splinter | 2003 | Dexter Holland | Brendan O'Brien | Track 4 |
| "Hopeless" | Party Animal | 1985 | Dexter Holland | N/A | Track 9 |
| "Huck It" | Conspiracy of One | 2000 | Dexter Holland | Brendan O'Brien | Track 14 (Australian and European bonus track) |
| "Hurting as One" | Days Go By | 2012 | Dexter Holland | Bob Rock | Track 5 |
| "Hypodermic" | Ignition | 1992 | Dexter Holland | Thom Wilson | Track 7 |
| "I Choose" | Ixnay on the Hombre | 1997 | Dexter Holland | Dave Jerden | Track 8 |
| "I Got a Right" | Club Me EP | 1997 | Iggy Pop | Dave Jerden | Track 3; Iggy Pop cover |
| "I Wanna Be Sedated" | Why Don't You Get A Job Single | 1999 | Dee Dee Ramone, Joey Ramone, Johnny Ramone | Dave Jerden | Track 3; The Ramones cover |
| "I Wanna Secret Family (With You)" | Days Go By | 2012 | Dexter Holland | Bob Rock | Track 10 |
| "I'll Be Waiting" | I'll Be Waiting Single | 1986 | Dexter Holland | The Offspring, Jim Dotson | Track 1 |
| "I'll Be Waiting" | The Offspring | 1989 | Dexter Holland | Thom Wilson | Track 10 |
| "Intermission" | Ixnay on the Hombre | 1997 | Irving Caesar, Vincent Youmans | Dave Jerden | Track 8 |
| "In the Hall of the Mountain King" | Let the Bad Times Roll | 2021 | Dexter Holland | Bob Rock | Track 8 |
| "Intro" | Conspiracy of One | 2000 | Dexter Holland | Brendan O'Brien | Track 1 |
| "It'll Be a Long Time" | Smash | 1994 | Dexter Holland | Thom Wilson | Track 9 |
| "It's Quick It's Easy It's The Law" | 6 songs demo | 1986 | Dexter Holland | N/A | Track 2 |
| "Jennifer Lost the War" | The Offspring | 1989 | Dexter Holland | Thom Wilson | Track 1 |
| "Kick Him When He's Down" | Ignition | 1992 | Dexter Holland | Thom Wilson | Track 3 |
| "The Kids Aren't Alright" | Americana | 1998 | Dexter Holland | Dave Jerden | Track 5 |
| "Kill the President" | The Offspring | 1989 | Dexter Holland | Thom Wilson | Track 11 (Removed in the 2001 re-issue) |
| "Killboy Powerhead" | Smash | 1994 | The Didjits | Thom Wilson | Track 10 |
| "Kristy, Are You Doing Okay?" | Rise and Fall, Rage and Grace | 2008 | Dexter Holland | Bob Rock | Track 7 |
| "L.A.P.D." | Ignition | 1992 | Dexter Holland | Thom Wilson | Track 10 |
| "Leave It Behind" | Ixnay on the Hombre | 1997 | Dexter Holland | Dave Jerden | Track 6 |
| "Let the Bad Times Roll" | Let the Bad Times Roll | 2021 | Dexter Holland | Bob Rock | Track 2 |
| "Let's Hear It for Rock Bottom" | Rise and Fall, Rage and Grace | 2008 | Dexter Holland | Bob Rock | Track 11 |
| "Light It Up" | Supercharged | 2024 | Dexter Holland | Bob Rock | Track 2 |
| "Lightning Rod" | Splinter | 2003 | Dexter Holland | Brendan O'Brien | Track 9 |
| "Living in Chaos" | Conspiracy of One | 2000 | Dexter Holland | Brendan O'Brien | Track 7 |
| "Long Way Home" | Splinter | 2003 | Dexter Holland | Brendan O'Brien | Track 3 |
| "Looking Out For #1" | Supercharged | 2024 | Dexter Holland | Bob Rock | Track 1 |
| "A Lot Like Me" | Rise and Fall, Rage and Grace | 2008 | Dexter Holland | Bob Rock | Track 5 |
| "Lullaby" | Let the Bad Times Roll | 2021 | Dexter Holland | Bob Rock | Track 12 |
| "Make It All Right" | Supercharged | 2024 | Dexter Holland | Bob Rock | Track 4 |
| "Me & My Old Lady" | Ixnay on the Hombre | 1997 | Dexter Holland | Dave Jerden | Track 4 |
| "The Meaning of Life" | Ixnay on the Hombre | 1997 | Dexter Holland | Dave Jerden | Track 2 |
| "Million Miles Away" | Conspiracy of One | 2000 | Dexter Holland | Brendan O'Brien | Track 5 |
| "Mission From God" | Punk-O-Rama Vol. 10 | 2005 | Dexter Holland | Thom Wilson | Track 12 |
| "Mota" | Ixnay on the Hombre | 1997 | Dexter Holland | Dave Jerden | Track 3 |
| "Neocon" | Splinter | 2003 | Dexter Holland | Brendan O'Brien | Track 1 |
| "Never Gonna Find Me" | Splinter | 2003 | Dexter Holland | Brendan O'Brien | Track 8 |
| "Next to You" | Greatest Hits | 2005 | The Police | Jerry Finn | Track 14 |
| "Nitro (Youth Energy)" | Smash | 1994 | Dexter Holland | Thom Wilson | Track 2 |
| "No Brakes" | Americana | 1998 | Dexter Holland | Dave Jerden | Track 10 |
| "No Control" | Summer Nationals | 2014 | Greg Graffin | Bob Rock | Track 2 |
| "No Reason Why" | Summer Nationals | 2014 | Pennywise | Bob Rock | Track 3 |
| "No Hero" | Ignition | 1992 | Dexter Holland | Thom Wilson | Track 9 |
| "The Noose" | Splinter | 2003 | Dexter Holland | Brendan O'Brien | Track 2 |
| "Not the One" | Smash | 1994 | Dexter Holland | Thom Wilson | Track 13 |
| "Nothing from Something" | Ignition | 1992 | Dexter Holland, Marvin Fergusen | Thom Wilson | Track 11 |
| "Nothingtown" | Rise and Fall, Rage and Grace | 2008 | Dexter Holland | Bob Rock | Track 8 |
| "OC Guns" | Days Go By | 2012 | Dexter Holland | Bob Rock | Track 8 |
| "O.C. Life" | Rise and Fall, Rage and Grace | 2008 | D.I. | Bob Rock | Track 13 (Japanese bonus track) |
| "Ok, But This Is The Last Time" | Supercharged | 2024 | Dexter Holland | Bob Rock | Track 5 |
| "One Fine Day" | Conspiracy of One | 2000 | Dexter Holland | Brendan O'Brien | Track 9 |
| "One Hundred Punks" | Defy You Single | 2001 | Generation X | Brendan O'Brien | Track 2 |
| "The Opioid Diaries" | Let the Bad Times Roll | 2021 | Dexter Holland | Bob Rock | Track 9 |
| "Original Prankster" | Conspiracy of One | 2000 | Dexter Holland | Brendan O'Brien | Track 3 |
| "Out on Patrol" | The Offspring | 1989 | Dexter Holland | Thom Wilson | Track 3 |
| "Pay the Man" | Americana | 1998 | Dexter Holland | Dave Jerden | Track 13 |
| "Pretty Fly (for a White Guy)" | Americana | 1998 | Dexter Holland | Dave Jerden | Track 4 |
| "Prophecy" | 5 songs demo | 1986 | Dexter Holland | N/A | Track 4; Later changed to "Demons" |
| "Race Against Myself" | Splinter | 2003 | Dexter Holland | Brendan O'Brien | Track 5 |
| "Rise and Fall" | Rise and Fall, Rage and Grace | 2008 | Dexter Holland | Bob Rock | Track 12 |
| "Secrets from the Underground" | Days Go By | 2012 | Dexter Holland | Bob Rock | Track 2 |
| "Self Esteem" | Smash | 1994 | Dexter Holland | Thom Wilson | Track 8 |
| "Session" | Ignition | 1992 | Dexter Holland, Kristine Luna, Jill Eckhaus | Thom Wilson | Track 1 |
| "Sharknado (Gigantor Theme)" | Sharknado 4: The 4th Awakens Soundtrack | 2016 | Eugene Raskin, Louis Singer | Bob Rock | Track 20 |
| "She's Got Issues" | Americana | 1998 | Dexter Holland | Dave Jerden | Track 7 |
| "Sin City" | Million Miles Away single | 2001 | Bon Scott, Angus Young, Malcolm Young | Brendan O'Brien | Track 3; AC/DC cover |
| "Slim Pickens Does the Right Thing and Rides the Bomb to Hell" | Days Go By | 2012 | Dexter Holland | Bob Rock | Track 12 |
| "Smash" | Smash | 1994 | Dexter Holland | Thom Wilson | Track 14 |
| "Smash It Up" | Batman Forever Soundtrack | 1995 | The Damned | Thom Wilson | Track 1 |
| "So Alone" | Smash | 1994 | Dexter Holland | Thom Wilson | Track 12 |
| "Something to Believe In" | Smash | 1994 | Dexter Holland | Thom Wilson | Track 6 |
| "Spare Me the Details" | Splinter | 2003 | Dexter Holland | Brendan O'Brien | Track 11 |
| "Special Delivery" | Conspiracy of One | 2000 | Dexter Holland | Brendan O'Brien | Track 8 |
| "Staring at the Sun" | Americana | 1998 | Dexter Holland | Dave Jerden | Track 3 |
| "Stuff Is Messed Up" | Rise and Fall, Rage and Grace | 2008 | Dexter Holland | Bob Rock | Track 9 |
| "Take It Like a Man" | The Big One compilation | 1991 | Dexter Holland | Mr. Brett | Track 5 |
| "Take It Like a Man" | Ignition | 1992 | Dexter Holland | Thom Wilson | Track 4 |
| "Takes me Nowhere" | Rise and Fall, Rage and Grace | 2008 | Dexter Holland | Bob Rock | Track 6 |
| "Tehran" | The Offspring | 1989 | Dexter Holland | Thom Wilson | Track 7 |
| "Totalimmortal" | Me, Myself & Irene Soundtrack | 2000 | AFI | Brendan O'Brien | Track 5; AFI cover |
| "A Thousand Days" | The Offspring | 1989 | Dexter Holland | Dexter Holland | Track 8 |
| "This Is Not Utopia" | Let the Bad Times Roll | 2021 | Dexter Holland | Bob Rock | Track 1 |
| "Time to Relax" | Smash | 1994 | Dexter Holland | Thom Wilson | Track 1 |
| "Tonight I Do" | 6 Songs demo | 1986 | Dexter Holland | N/A | Track 2 |
| "Trust in You" | Rise and Fall, Rage and Grace | 2008 | Dexter Holland | Bob Rock | Track 2 |
| "Truth In Fiction" | Supercharged | 2024 | Dexter Holland | Bob Rock | Track 6 |
| "Turning into You" | Days Go By | 2012 | Dexter Holland | Bob Rock | Track 4 |
| "Vultures" | Conspiracy of One | 2000 | Dexter Holland | Brendan O'Brien | Track 12 |
| "Walla Walla" | Americana | 1998 | Dexter Holland | Dave Jerden | Track 8 |
| "Want You Bad" | Conspiracy of One | 2000 | Dexter Holland | Brendan O'Brien | Track 4 |
| "Way Down the Line" | Ixnay on the Hombre | 1997 | Dexter Holland | Dave Jerden | Track 11 |
| "We Are One" | Ignition | 1992 | Dexter Holland | Thom Wilson | Track 2 |
| "Welcome" | Americana | 1998 | Dexter Holland | Dave Jerden | Track 1 |
| "We Never Have Sex Anymore" | Let the Bad Times Roll | 2021 | Dexter Holland | Bob Rock | Track 7 |
| "What Happened to You?" | Smash | 1994 | Dexter Holland | Thom Wilson | Track 11 |
| "When You're in Prison" | Splinter | 2003 | Dexter Holland | Brendan O'Brien | Track 12 |
| "Why Don't You Get a Job?" | Americana | 1998 | Dexter Holland | Dave Jerden | Track 11 |
| "The Worst Hangover Ever" | Splinter | 2003 | Dexter Holland | Brendan O'Brien | Track 7 |
| "You Can't Get There From Here" | Supercharged | 2024 | Dexter Holland | Bob Rock | Track 10 |
| "You're Gonna Go Far, Kid" | Rise and Fall, Rage and Grace | 2008 | Dexter Holland | Bob Rock | Track 3 |

== See also ==
- The Offspring discography
