= Happy Hour! =

2010 compilation album by The Offspring

Compilation album by The Offspring
- Released: August 4, 2010
- Recorded: March 1989 – July 2010
- Genre: Punk rock
- Length: 58:33
- Label: Sony Japan
- Producers: Thom Wilson, Dave Jerden, Brendan O'Brien, The Offspring

The Offspring chronology
Rise and Fall, Rage and Grace (2008)	Happy Hour! (2010)	Days Go By (2012)

Happy Hour! is a Japanese exclusive compilation album by the American punk rock band the Offspring. It was released on August 4, 2010. The album chronicles tracks from approximately 15 years of the band's career. It is The Offspring's first record that wasn't made available in America.

The album includes live versions and remixes of tracks from their studio albums Smash, Ixnay on the Hombre, Americana, Conspiracy of One, and Splinter. Although it was released two years after Rise and Fall, Rage and Grace, this compilation does not contain any live versions or remixes of tracks from that album. It also includes songs from soundtracks and various B-sides. The album also contains covers of tracks by bands such as The Buzzcocks, Iggy & The Stooges, T.S.O.L., Billy Roberts, and AC/DC.

== Track listing ==
All tracks are written by Dexter Holland, except where noted.

No.	Title	Original appearance	Length
1.	"Come Out And Play" (Live)	"(Can't Get My) Head Around You" single (2004)	3:11
2.	"Pretty Fly (for a White Guy)" (Live)	"The Kids Aren't Alright" single (1999)	3:05
3.	"All I Want" (Live)	"She's Got Issues" single (1999)	2:07
4.	"Gone Away" (Live)	"Original Prankster" single (2001)	4:17
5.	"Staring at the Sun" (Live)	"Million Miles Away" single (2001)	2:27
6.	"Hit That" (Live)	"(Can't Get My) Head Around You" single (2004)	2:47
7.	"Gotta Get Away" (Live)	"(Can't Get My) Head Around You" single (2004)	3:47
8.	"Dammit, I Changed Again" (Live)	"Million Miles Away" single (2001)	2:55
9.	"D.U.I." (music by Dexter Holland, lyrics by Kevin "Noodles" Wasserman)	"Club Me" EP (1997)	2:30
10.	"Beheaded (1999)"	Idle Hands Soundtrack (1999)	2:41
11.	"Sin City" (AC/DC cover)	"Million Miles Away" single (2001)	4:27
12.	"I Got A Right" (The Stooges cover)	Club Me EP (1997)	2:22
13.	"Hey Joe" (Billy Roberts cover)	The Offspring (1989)	2:39
14.	"80 Times" (T.S.O.L. cover)	"Want You Bad" single (2000)	2:07
15.	"Autonomy" (Buzzcocks cover)	"Want You Bad" single (2000)	2:36
16.	"Want You Bad" (Blag Dahlia Remix)	"Million Miles Away" single (2001)	3:10
17.	"Why Don't You Get a Job?" (The Baka Boyz Remix)	"Why Don't You Get a Job?" single (1999)	4:21
18.	"Million Miles Away" (Apollo 440 Remix)	"Million Miles Away" single (2001)	4:01
19.	"Pretty Fly (for a White Guy)" (The Baka Boyz Low Rider Remix)	"She's Got Issues" single (1999)	3:03
Total length:			58:33

== Personnel ==
The Offspring

- Dexter Holland – vocals, guitar
- Noodles – guitar, backing vocals
- Greg K. – bass, backing vocals
- Ron Welty – drums (all tracks except 1, 6, 7; uncredited)
- Atom Willard – drums (1, 6, 7; uncredited)

Additional musicians

- Chris "X-13" Higgins – rhythm guitar, keyboards, percussion, backing vocals (tracks 1–8; uncredited)
