= The Offspring Collection =

1999 compilation album

Box set by The Offspring
- Released: August 4, 1999
- Recorded: 1994–1998
- Genre: Punk rock Pop punk
- Length: 38:49
- Label: Musicrama Records; Koch Records; Epitaph Records
- Producer: Dave Jerden; Thom Wilson

The Offspring chronology
A Piece of Americana (1998)	The Offspring Collection (1999)	Conspiracy of One (2000)

The Offspring Collection is a box set containing four discs from American punk rock band the Offspring. The set contains four CD singles ("Come Out and Play," "Self Esteem," "Gotta Get Away," and "Pretty Fly (For a White Guy)"). In addition, the box set also includes 2 buttons; one reading "Pretty Fly", and the other reading "For A White Guy". It also includes an Offspring sticker, and a "31" temporary tattoo, as well as an XL T-shirt that has "Pretty fly" on the front with a small cartoon character and "Offspring 31" on the back. It is not an official release by The Offspring.

== Track listing ==
=== "Come Out and Play" ===
No.	Title	Length
1.	"Come Out and Play"	3:17
2.	"Session"	2:33
3.	"Come Out and Play" (Acoustic Reprise)	1:31

=== "Self Esteem" ===
No.	Title	Length
1.	"Self Esteem"	4:17
2.	"Burn It Up"	2:43
3.	"Jennifer Lost the War"	2:35

=== "Gotta Get Away" ===
No.	Title	Length
1.	"Gotta Get Away"	3:56
2.	"We Are One"	4:00
3.	"Forever and a Day"	2:37

=== "Pretty Fly (for a White Guy)" ===
No.	Title	Length
1.	"Pretty Fly (for a White Guy)"	3:08
2.	"Pretty Fly (for a White Guy)" (The Geek Mix)	3:07
3.	"Pretty Fly (for a White Guy)" (The Baka Boys Low Rider Remix)	3:03
4.	"All I Want" (Live)	2:02

== Personnel ==
- Dexter Holland – lead and backing vocals, rhythm guitar
- Noodles – lead guitar, backing vocals
- Greg K. – bass, backing vocals
- Ron Welty – drums
