= Greatest Hits (The Offspring album) =

2005 greatest hits album by The Offspring

Greatest hits album by The Offspring
- Released: June 20, 2005 (Europe, United Kingdom); June 21, 2005 (North America)
- Recorded: 1994–2004
- Genres: Punk rock; skate punk; pop-punk; alternative rock
- Length: 49:42
- Label: Columbia
- Producers: Jerry Finn; Thom Wilson; Dave Jerden; Brendan O'Brien

The Offspring chronology
| Splinter (2003) | Greatest Hits (2005) | Rise and Fall, Rage and Grace (2008) |

Singles from Greatest Hits
- 1. "Can't Repeat" Released: June 20, 2005; 2. "Next to You" Released: June 21, 2005

Professional ratings
Review scores
| Source | Rating |
|---|---|
| Allmusic | 3/5 stars |
| Blender | 4/5 stars |
| PopMatters | 7/10 stars |
| Sputnikmusic | 3/5 stars |

Greatest Hits is a 2005 compilation album by the American punk rock band the Offspring, compiling hit singles from five of their first seven studio albums along with the previously unreleased songs "Can't Repeat" and "Next to You", the latter a cover version of the Police song included as a hidden track at the end of the album. Greatest Hits peaked at no. 8 on the Billboard 200, with 70,000 copies sold in its first week of release, and has been certified Platinum by the Recording Industry Association of America.

"Can't Repeat" was released as a single to promote the album, and peaked at no. 9 on Billboard's Modern Rock Tracks chart and no. 10 on its Mainstream Rock Tracks. "Next to You" was also released as a single to radio stations, peaking at no. 29 on Mainstream Rock Tracks. A DVD/UMD video entitled Complete Music Video Collection was released a month later to complement Greatest Hits. It included the music videos for all fourteen songs on Greatest Hits (excluding "Next to You", for which no video was filmed), as well as three additional songs which had been released as singles but were not included on Greatest Hits: "The Meaning of Life" and "I Choose" from Ixnay on the Hombre, and "She's Got Issues" from Americana. These songs, along with several others the band had released as singles during the course of their career, had not charted as highly as those selected for Greatest Hits.

== Multiple drummers ==
The album's two new tracks, "Can't Repeat" and "Next to You", were recorded during the period in which Atom Willard was the band's official drummer. Original drummer Ron Welty was fired from the group in early 2003, and the Vandals drummer Josh Freese recorded the drum tracks for the band's 2003 album Splinter after his departure. Willard joined shortly after the album's release and appeared with them in the music video for the single "(Can't Get My) Head Around You". Willard appeared in the "Can't Repeat" music video and recorded the drum tracks for "Next to You". In July 2007 Willard officially announced that he was leaving The Offspring to focus on Angels & Airwaves. Freese again recorded drum tracks for the Offspring for their 2008 album Rise and Fall, Rage and Grace before it was announced that Willard's permanent replacement would be former Face to Face drummer Pete Parada who did not record on the album due contractual issues.

== Track listing ==
All music is composed by The Offspring except where noted.

| No. | Title | From | Length |
|---|---|---|---|
| 1. | "Can't Repeat" | previously unreleased | 3:24 |
| 2. | "Come Out and Play (Keep 'Em Separated)" | Smash, 1994 | 3:17 |
| 3. | "Self Esteem" | Smash, 1994 | 4:17 |
| 4. | "Gotta Get Away" | Smash, 1994 | 3:51 |
| 5. | "All I Want" | Ixnay on the Hombre, 1997 | 1:54 |
| 6. | "Gone Away" | Ixnay on the Hombre, 1997 | 4:27 |
| 7. | "Pretty Fly (For a White Guy)" (contains a sample of "Rock of Ages" by Def Leppard as written by Robert Lange, Joe Elliott, and Steve Clark) | Americana, 1998 | 3:08 |
| 8. | "Why Don't You Get a Job?" | Americana, 1998 | 2:49 |
| 9. | "The Kids Aren't Alright" | Americana, 1998 | 3:00 |
| 10. | "Original Prankster" (featuring Redman; contains portions of "Low Rider" by War) | Conspiracy of One, 2000 | 3:41 |
| 11. | "Want You Bad" | Conspiracy of One, 2000 | 3:22 |
| 12. | "Defy You" | Orange County soundtrack, 2001 | 3:48 |
| 13. | "Hit That" | Splinter, 2003 | 2:48 |
| 14. | "(Can't Get My) Head Around You": "Next to You" (hidden track, the Police cover) | Splinter, 2003 previously unreleased | 5:57 |
| Total length: | | | 49:42 |

=== International bonus tracks ===
- On each edition, "Next to You" appears as a hidden track on track 15.

Australian edition
| No. | Title | From | Length |
|---|---|---|---|
| 15. | "Spare Me the Details" | Splinter, 2003 | 3:24 |
| Total length: | | | 53:04 |

Japanese edition
| No. | Title | From | Length |
|---|---|---|---|
| 15. | "Da Hui" | Splinter, 2003 | 1:42 |
| Total length: | | | 51:13 |

European and South American editions
| No. | Title | From | Length |
|---|---|---|---|
| 15. | "The Kids Aren't Alright" (The Wiseguys remix) | "She's Got Issues", 1999 | 4:56 |
| Total length: | | | 54:36 |

=== DualDisc edition ===
The DualDisc edition of the album has the standard 14 track album on the CD side. The DVD side has the same 14 tracks in 5.1 surround sound, commentary by singer Dexter Holland and guitarist Noodles, and the two performing an acoustic rendition of the song "Dirty Magic" from the band's second album Ignition.

=== Vinyl edition ===
The vinyl edition of the album was released July 29, 2022. It came in three formats: a black LP with lyric insert, a limited-edition picture disc featuring the band's flaming skull logo and a limited-edition version with a slipmat also featuring the flaming skull logo. Prior to that, on Record Store Day 2022, Greatest Hits was released on vinyl in a limited run of 7,000 copies on either translucent or solid blue. All vinyl versions feature the standard 14 track album.

== Personnel ==
The Offspring

- Dexter Holland – vocals, guitar (uncredited for guitar)
- Noodles – guitar, backing vocals (uncredited for backing vocals)
- Greg K. – bass, backing vocals (uncredited for backing vocals)
- Ron Welty – drums on tracks 2–12, and on track 15 of the European and South American editions
- Atom Willard – drums on "Next to You" (uncredited)

Additional musicians

- Josh Freese – drums on tracks 1, 13, 14, as well as on track 15 of the Australian and Japanese editions
- Ronnie King – keyboards on "Hit That"
- Gabe McNair and Phil Jordan – horns on "Why Don't You Get a Job?"
- Derrick Davis – flute on "Why Don't You Get a Job?"

Additional vocalists

- Jason "Blackball" McLean – additional vocals on "Come Out and Play (Keep 'Em Separated)"
- Chris "X-13" Higgins – backing vocals, additional vocals on "Pretty Fly (For a White Guy)"
- Heidi Villagran and Nika Futterman Frost – additional vocals on "Pretty Fly (For a White Guy)"
- Jack Grisham, Davey Havok, and Jim Lindberg – backing vocals on "Pretty Fly (For a White Guy)"
- Redman – additional vocals on "Original Prankster"

Production

- Jerry Finn – producer and mixer of "Can't Repeat" and "Next To You"
- Joe McGrath – recording engineer of "Can't Repeat", assisted by Seth Waldman
- Thom Wilson – producer and engineer of tracks 2–4, with additional engineering by Ken Paulakovich
- Dave Jerden – producer and mix engineer of tracks 5–9
- Bryan Carlstrom – engineer of tracks 5–9
- Brendan O'Brien – producer and mix engineer of tracks 10–14
- Nick DiDia – engineer of tracks 10 and 11, recording of tracks 12 and 13
- Billy Bowers – additional engineering on tracks 10–14
- Chris Higgins – additional recording on tracks 10 and 12
- Karl Egsieker – recording (with DiDia) of "Hit That", recording of "(Can't Get My) Head Around You"
- Eddy Schreyer – mastering of all tracks except 1 and 13
- Brian Gardner – mastering of tracks 1 and 13

== Charts ==
=== Weekly charts ===
Weekly chart performance for Greatest Hits
| Chart (2005) | Peak position |
|---|---|
| Australian Albums (ARIA) | 2 |
| Austrian Albums (Ö3 Austria) | 6 |
| Belgian Albums (Ultratop Flanders) | 17 |
| Belgian Albums (Ultratop Wallonia) | 11 |
| Canadian Albums (Billboard) | 6 |
| Dutch Albums (Album Top 100) | 38 |
| Finnish Albums (Suomen virallinen lista) | 1 |
| German Albums (Offizielle Top 100) | 23 |
| Irish Albums (IRMA) | 8 |
| Italian Albums (FIMI) | 22 |
| Japanese Albums (Oricon) | 6 |
| New Zealand Albums (RMNZ) | 1 |
| Portuguese Albums (AFP) | 24 |
| Scottish Albums (Official Charts) | 11 |
| Spanish Albums (Promusicae) | 24 |
| Swedish Albums (Sverigetopplistan) | 24 |
| Swiss Albums (Schweizer Hitparade) | 5 |
| UK Albums (Official Charts) | 14 |
| US Billboard 200 | 8 |

2022 weekly chart performance
| Chart (2022) | Peak position |
|---|---|
| US Top Alternative Albums (Billboard) | 12 |
| US Top Rock Albums (Billboard) | 20 |
| US Vinyl Albums (Billboard) | 12 |

=== Year-end charts ===
Year-end chart performance for Greatest Hits
| Chart (2005) | Position |
|---|---|
| Australian Albums (ARIA) | 32 |
| New Zealand Albums (RMNZ) | 32 |
| Swiss Albums (Schweizer Hitparade) | 65 |
| US Billboard 200 | 196 |

== Certifications ==
Certifications and sales for Greatest Hits
| Region | Certification | Certified units/sales |
|---|---|---|
| Australia (ARIA) | 3× Platinum | 210,000^{^} |
| Canada (Music Canada) | Platinum | 100,000^{^} |
| France (SNEP) | Gold | 100,000^{*} |
| Germany (BVMI) | Gold | 100,000^{‡} |
| Ireland (IRMA) | Gold | 7,500^{^} |
| Japan (RIAJ) | Platinum | 250,000^{^} |
| New Zealand (RMNZ) | Platinum | 15,000^{^} |
| Russia (NFPF) | Gold | 10,000^{*} |
| Switzerland (IFPI Switzerland) | Gold | 20,000^{^} |
| United Kingdom (BPI) | Gold | 100,000^{^} |
| United States (RIAA) | Platinum | 1,000,000^{^} |
^{*} Sales figures based on certification alone.^{^} Shipments figures based on certification alone.^{‡} Sales+streaming figures based on certification alone.
