= The Offspring: Complete Music Video Collection =

2005 compilation of The Offspring's music videos and concert performances

Complete Music Video Collection

Video by The Offspring
- Released: July 5, 2005 (July 19, 2005 in the United States)
- Recorded: 1983–2005
- Genre: Punk rock Pop punk Alternative rock Skate punk
- Length: Over 2 Hours
- Label: Columbia
- Producer: Thom Wilson; Dave Jerden; Brendan O'Brien; Jerry Finn

The Offspring chronology
Huck It (2000)	Complete Music Video Collection (2005)

Professional ratings
Review scores
Source	Rating
Sputnikmusic	4.5/5

Complete Music Video Collection is an extensive video album (released in DVD and UMD formats) by the American punk rock band The Offspring. It was released to accompany the Greatest Hits CD, which arrived a month earlier, and shows all of the band's videos between 1994 and 2005 (except for "Million Miles Away"). It also contains 11 live performances, two extra videos, an interview, and commentary by the band.

== Track listing ==
- All songs with commentary, except for "Can't Repeat".
1. "Come Out and Play (Keep 'Em Separated)" – 3:16
2. "Self Esteem" – 4:26
3. "Gotta Get Away" – 4:12
4. "All I Want" – 1:57
5. "Gone Away" – 4:31
6. "The Meaning of Life" – 2:58
7. "I Choose" – 4:02
8. "Pretty Fly (for a White Guy)" – 3:14
9. "Why Don't You Get a Job?" – 3:13
10. "The Kids Aren't Alright" – 3:00
11. "She's Got Issues" – 3:49
12. "Original Prankster" – 3:41
13. "Want You Bad" – 3:24
14. "Defy You" – 3:48
15. "Hit That" – 3:01
16. "(Can't Get My) Head Around You" – 2:14
17. "Can't Repeat" – 3:25

== Bonus ==
=== Extra videos ===
1. "Da Hui" – 2:50
2. "Cool to Hate" – 2:59

=== Live performances ===
==== House of Blues 1998 ====
1. "Self Esteem" – 3:58
2. "All I Want" – 1:53
3. "Pretty Fly (for a White Guy)" – 3:00
4. "Why Don't You Get a Job?" – 2:56

==== MTV's Smash to Splinter ====
5. "Long Way Home" – 2:25
6. "Hit That" – 2:52
7. "Gotta Get Away" – 3:34
8. "The Worst Hangover Ever" – 3:13
9. "Come Out and Play (Keep 'Em Separated)" – 3:49
10. "(Can't Get My) Head Around You" – 2:04
11. "The Kids Aren't Alright" – 3:08

=== Other features ===
- The making-of "Da Hui" featurette where Noodles speaks about how the video for the song was made. – 9:55
- An interview between Dexter Holland and Guy Cohen, the actor who played the wigger in "Pretty Fly (for a White Guy)"'s music video. – 5:40
- A storyboard gallery for the songs "The Kids Aren't Alright", "Pretty Fly (for A White Guy)", and "Gone Away". – 4:29

== Hidden videos ==
- A 1983 video of Dexter Holland and Greg K. (both teenagers at the time) playing the drums and bass respectively in a garage in Cypress. In the same video, they are shown 15 months later, Dexter is now shown as the vocalist and playing the guitar. James Lilja is now playing the drums. This video also appeared on their first VHS/DVD Americana. – 2:45
- An instrumental marching band performance of "Hit That". – 2:28
- A live performance of the Ignition song "Get It Right", in London during 1993. – 2:02

== Charts ==
Chart (2005)	Peak position
Australian Music DVDs Chart	3
Greek Music DVDs Chart	3
Italian Music DVDs Chart	19
New Zealand Music DVDs Chart	9
US Music Videos Chart	13

== Certifications ==
Region	Certification	Certified units/sales
Australia (ARIA)	Platinum	15,000^{^}
Canada (Music Canada)	4× Platinum	40,000^{^}
United States (RIAA)	Gold	50,000^{^}
^{^} Shipments figures based on certification alone.
