= I Choose =

Single by The Offspring

from the album Ixnay on the Hombre
- Released: December 1997 (Aus)
- Recorded: 1996
- Genre: Punk rock
- Length: 3:54
- Label: Columbia
- Songwriter: Dexter Holland
- Producer: Dave Jerden

The Offspring singles chronology
"The Meaning of Life" (1997)	"I Choose" (1997)	"Pretty Fly (For a White Guy)" (1998)

"I Choose" is a punk rock song by the Offspring. It is the eighth track on their fourth studio album, Ixnay on the Hombre (1997), and was released in Australia as its fourth and final single.

The single enjoyed less commercial success compared with the previous singles from the album and was omitted from the band's Greatest Hits album (2005). However, it became another top 10 Hot Mainstream Rock Track for The Offspring.

== Literary reference ==
The song, in its second verse, contains a literary reference to J. D. Salinger's short story, "A Perfect Day for Bananafish." In the story, the protagonist, who is suicidally depressed, tells a little girl at a Florida beach a story about bananafish, a fictional species of fish that hides in its burrow, eating bananas, until it is trapped inside forever and dies of banana fever. In the original work, the bananafish is a tragic creature, but the song looks at the tragedy and laughs anyway, saying it "doesn't really matter" and shrugging off the self-pity of the original.

== Music video ==
The video for the song was directed by the band's lead singer and songwriter, Dexter Holland. The video takes place in an airport, where the band members depart from a taxi cab. While people are dancing, a skateboarder skates through. When his bag is checked, the x-ray sees a "ticking clock". Thinking that it is a bomb, a security guard chases him down only to open his bag and find a Flava Flav style clock necklace. This footage is spliced with footage of the band performing antics of their own (such as lead guitarist Noodles playing the solo on a conveyor belt) and performing in a completely different place where heavy winds blow trash into their equipment.

On the Greatest Hits DVD, the band joked about the idea of making a video like this now, with the seriousness of airport security. The band considered it one of their best music videos.

=== DVD appearances ===
The music video also appears on the Complete Music Video Collection DVD. It was released in 2005.

== Track listing ==
No.	Title	Length
1.	"I Choose"	3:54
2.	"All I Want" (Live)	2:02
3.	"Mota"	2:55

== Personnel ==
=== The Offspring ===
- Dexter Holland – vocals, guitar
- Noodles – guitar, backing vocals
- Greg K. – bass
- Ron Welty – drums

=== Additional musicians ===
- Paulinho da Costa – additional percussion

== Charts ==
Chart (1997)	Peak position
Australia (ARIA)	79
Australia Alternative (ARIA)	18
US Alternative Airplay (Billboard)	24
US Mainstream Rock (Billboard)	5
