= Million Miles Away (The Offspring song) =

2001 single by the Offspring

Single by the Offspring

from the album Conspiracy of One
- B-side: "Sin City"
- Released: June 25, 2001
- Length: 3:40
- Label: Columbia
- Songwriter: Dexter Holland
- Producer: Brendan O'Brien

The Offspring singles chronology
"Want You Bad" (2000)	"Million Miles Away" (2001)	"Defy You" (2001)

"Million Miles Away" is a song by the American punk rock band the Offspring. It is the fifth track on the band's sixth studio album, Conspiracy of One (2000), and was released to US radio in March 2001. It was released as a single in Europe in June 2001. The song was not included on the band's Greatest Hits (2005) or Complete Music Video Collection (2005), although the song was featured on the trailer for the film Orange County.

The single's B-side is "Sin City", which is a cover of the AC/DC song from their 1978 album Powerage. It appeared on the Offspring's 2010 Japan-only compilation album Happy Hour!.

== Reception ==
The song is fairly popular among many Offspring fans, often called the best on Conspiracy of One despite its release as a third single. Aside from being a stronger song, this also may be because it is less deliberately mainstream than the previous two singles and also has a more serious subject matter. However, it is rarely played live and remains one of their less well-known singles.

== Music video ==
The song's only music video was that of a live performance dubbed over by the recorded version of the song, and was directed by Jennifer Lebeau. This may have played a part in its lesser success as a single as well as its exclusion from the Greatest Hits compilation album and Complete Music Video Collection DVD. The recording took place at Wembley Arena.

== Live performances ==
On May 29, 2024, the band performed the song alongside the popular English musician Ed Sheeran.

== Track listings ==
Australia maxi-CD single

No.	Title	Length
1.	"Million Miles Away"	3:40
2.	"Dammit, I Changed Again" (live at Wembley Arena)	2:53
3.	"Sin City" (AC/DC cover)	4:24
4.	"Want You Bad" (Blag Dahlia mix)	3:15
5.	"Million Miles Away" (Apollo 440 remix)	4:02

UK CD1

No.	Title	Length
1.	"Million Miles Away"	3:40
2.	"Sin City" (AC/DC cover)	4:33
3.	"Staring at the Sun" (live; taken from the film Huck It)	2:26
4.	"Million Miles Away" (CD extra video)	3:40

UK CD2

No.	Title	Length
1.	"Million Miles Away"	3:40
2.	"Dammit, I Changed Again" (live at Wembley Arena)	2:53
3.	"Bad Habit" (live at Wembley Arena)	3:59

- This edition also includes a free poster.

== Personnel ==
- Dexter Holland – vocals, guitar
- Noodles – guitar, backing vocals
- Greg K. – bass, backing vocals
- Ron Welty – drums

== Charts ==
Chart (2001)	Peak position
Australia (ARIA)	69
Europe (Eurochart Hot 100)	74
Ireland (IRMA)	49
Italy (FIMI)	42
Latvia (Latvijas Top 40)	25
Switzerland (Schweizer Hitparade)	97
UK Singles (OCC)	21
UK Rock & Metal (OCC)	1

== Release history ==
Region	Date	Format(s)	Label(s)	Ref.
United States	March 20, 2001	Alternative radio	Columbia	
United States	May 15, 2001	Mainstream rock; active rock radio	Columbia	
United Kingdom	June 25, 2001	CD; cassette	Columbia	
Japan	July 18, 2001	CD	Epic	
Australia	August 6, 2001	CD	Columbia	
