= Want You Bad =

2001 single by the Offspring

Single by the Offspring

from the album Conspiracy of One
- B-side: "80 Times"
- Released: March 5, 2001
- Length: 3:23
- Label: Columbia
- Songwriter: Dexter Holland
- Producer: Brendan O'Brien

The Offspring singles chronology
"Original Prankster" (2000)	"Want You Bad" (2001)	"Million Miles Away" (2001)

"Want You Bad" is a song by American punk rock band the Offspring. The song appears as the fourth track on the band's sixth studio album, Conspiracy of One (2000), and was released to US radio in January 2001. It was released as a single overseas in March 2001. The song is also included on the band's Greatest Hits album (2005). It became another top-10 hit for the band on the US Billboard Modern Rock Tracks chart, peaking at number 10. The title is a play on words, with the narrator of the song saying to his girlfriend he wants her "to be bad" as in a dominatrix way, rather than he wants her "badly".

"Want You Bad" was remixed by the Dwarves singer Blag Dahlia. The remix appeared on some versions of the "Million Miles Away" single. Two of the single's B-sides, "80 Times" and "Autonomy", appeared on the band's 2010 Japan only compilation album Happy Hour!.

== Music video ==
The music video was filmed in Los Angeles, California, during January 10–11, 2001, and was directed by Spencer Susser. It takes place at a party, with the band playing in the background. The protagonist is a man trying it on with various women in attendance, failing each time. Soon, the partygoers start to open up cans with the Offspring logo on them. These explode violently with foam when opened leading to the party starting to get chaotic.

Eventually the man finds a woman who does not balk at his whispered suggestions. Meanwhile, the party has descended into chaos as the foam covers even the band and some of them are tackled to the ground by the partiers, though the music still plays. In the closing moments of the video, the woman is shown shaking one of the Offspring cans in front of the man. The man looks on excited as it finally explodes - the foam appears to blow his head off while the woman laughs and smiles as the camera fades to black.

Dexter Holland, the band's lead vocalist, said he hated this video, saying that it was too "cheesy", although it is one of his favorite songs.

The first model (in a black bikini) was played (supposedly) by Kim Smith, the second model (in a red dress) is Michelle Belegrin and the third model is Katelyn Rosaasen. The music video appears on the Complete Music Video Collection DVD, released in 2005.

== Track listings ==
Version 1

No.	Title	Length
1.	"Want You Bad"
2.	"80 Times" (T.S.O.L. cover)
3.	"All I Want" (live)
4.	"Autonomy" (Buzzcocks cover)

Version 2

No.	Title	Length
1.	"Want You Bad"	3:23
2.	"The Kids Aren't Alright" (live)	3:06
3.	"80 Times"	2:07
4.	"Want You Bad" (video CD extra)	3:23

Version 3

No.	Title	Length
1.	"Want You Bad"	3:23
2.	"All I Want" (live)
3.	"Autonomy"

== Personnel ==
- Dexter Holland – vocals, guitar
- Noodles – guitar
- Greg K. – bass
- Ron Welty – drums

== Charts ==
=== Weekly charts ===
Weekly chart performance for "Want You Bad"
Chart (2001)	Peak position
Australia (ARIA)	35
Austria (Ö3 Austria Top 40)	67
Canada (Nielsen Soundscan)	45
Europe (Eurochart Hot 100)	45
Finland (Suomen virallinen lista)	23
Ireland (IRMA)	43
Italy (FIMI)	36
Japan (Oricon)	47
Quebec (ADISQ)	27
Scotland Singles (OCC)	13
Sweden (Sverigetopplistan)	46
Switzerland (Schweizer Hitparade)	45
UK Singles (OCC)	15
US Alternative Airplay (Billboard)	10
US Mainstream Rock (Billboard)	23

=== Year-end charts ===
Year-end chart performance for "Want You Bad"
Chart (2001)	Position
UK Singles (OCC)	198
US Modern Rock Tracks (Billboard)	52

== Certifications ==
Certifications for "Want You Bad"
Region	Certification	Certified units/sales
New Zealand (RMNZ)	Gold	15,000^{‡}
United Kingdom (BPI)	Gold	400,000^{‡}
United States (RIAA)	Gold	500,000^{‡}
^{‡} Sales+streaming figures based on certification alone.

== Release history ==
Release dates and formats for "Want You Bad"
Region	Date	Format(s)	Label(s)	Ref.
United States	January 16, 2001	Mainstream rock; active rock radio	Columbia	
Australia	March 5, 2001	CD	Columbia	
Japan	March 7, 2001	CD	Epic	
United Kingdom	March 19, 2001	CD; cassette	Columbia	

== In popular culture ==
- The song was the opening song to the 2001 film Tomcats.
- The song was featured in the 2001 comedy film American Pie 2.
- The song was featured in the video game Crazy Taxi 3: High Roller.
