= Original Prankster =

2000 single by the Offspring

Single by the Offspring

from the album Conspiracy of One
- B-side: "Come Out Swinging"
- Released: October 25, 2000
- Length: 3:40
- Label: Columbia
- Songwriter: Dexter Holland
- Producer: Brendan O'Brien

The Offspring singles chronology
"She's Got Issues" (1999)	"Original Prankster" (2000)	"Want You Bad" (2000)

Music video
- "Original Prankster" on YouTube

"Original Prankster" is a song by American rock band the Offspring. It is featured as the third track from their sixth studio album, Conspiracy of One, and was released to radio as its first single on October 10, 2000. The song features additional vocals by Redman and is included on the band's 2005 Greatest Hits album.

Prior to the release of Conspiracy of One, the Offspring distributed the track for free as a downloadable MP3 file on their official website. A competition was held, featuring a prize of $1 million (USD), which was awarded to a randomly selected participant who downloaded the song.

"Original Prankster" reached the top 10 in several countries, including Australia, Sweden, and the United Kingdom, and went to the top 10 on the US and Canadian rock charts. The single went Platinum in Australia in 2001, becoming the third song by the Offspring to reach platinum status in that country after "Pretty Fly (for a White Guy)" and "Why Don't You Get a Job?."

== Music video ==
The song follows the prankster, the subject of the song, through his life, pulling various pranks on his superiors, being motivated by Redman as a spiritual guide. As a child, he slips his dog's feces into his father's sandwich. In his teen years, he uses a bunsen burner on a perverted science teacher. When sent to the principal's office, he sets up the principal to be photographed in a compromising position with two students. Throughout the video, the band is shown to be playing around the Venice Fishing Pier in Venice, Los Angeles.

Finally, in the present, he switches off the whole city's power supply, though the band still manages to play in the dark and the crowd use flares to light the scene. At the end of the video, lightning strikes the prankster and disintegrates him.

== Track listings ==
Version 1

No.	Title	Length
1.	"Original Prankster"	3:40
2.	"Come Out Swinging"	2:47
3.	"Staring at the Sun" (Live)	2:26

Australia CD Maxi

No.	Title	Length
1.	"Original Prankster"	3:40
2.	"Dammit, I Changed Again"	2:49
3.	"Come Out Swinging"	2:47
4.	"Gone Away" (Live)	4:19
5.	"Staring at the Sun" (Live)	2:26

== Personnel ==
The Offspring

- Dexter Holland – vocals, guitar
- Noodles – guitar
- Greg K. – bass
- Ron Welty – drums

Additional musicians

- Redman – additional vocals

== Charts ==
=== Weekly charts ===
Weekly chart performance for "Original Prankster"
Chart (2000–2001)	Peak position
Australia (ARIA)	5
Belgium (Ultratip Bubbling Under Flanders)	6
Belgium (Ultratop 50 Wallonia)	40
Canada (Nielsen Soundscan)	29
Canada Rock/Alternative (RPM)	5
El Salvador (El Siglo de Torreón)	3
Europe (Eurochart Hot 100)	14
European Radio Top 50 (Music & Media)	22
Finland (Suomen virallinen lista)	12
France (SNEP)	34
Germany (GfK)	46
Iceland (Íslenski Listinn Topp 40)	19
Ireland (IRMA)	24
Italy (FIMI)	11
Italy Airplay (Music & Media)	11
Netherlands (Dutch Top 40)	35
Netherlands (Single Top 100)	44
New Zealand (Recorded Music NZ)	34
Norway (VG-lista)	7
Portugal (AFP)	6
Quebec (ADISQ)	3
Scottish Singles Sales (Official Charts)	6
Spain Airplay (Music & Media)	11
Sweden (Sverigetopplistan)	5
Switzerland (Schweizer Hitparade)	20
UK Singles (Official Charts)	6
US Billboard Hot 100	70
US Alternative Airplay (Billboard)	2
US Mainstream Rock (Billboard)	7

=== Year-end charts ===
2000 year-end chart performance for "Original Prankster"
Chart (2000)	Position
Australia (ARIA)	93
Italy (Musica e dischi)	100
Sweden (Hitlistan)	52
UK Singles (OCC)	194
US Mainstream Rock Tracks (Billboard)	98
US Modern Rock Tracks (Billboard)	72

2001 year-end chart performance for "Original Prankster"
Chart (2001)	Position
Australia (ARIA)	68
Canada (Nielsen SoundScan)	193
US Mainstream Rock Tracks (Billboard)	47
US Modern Rock Tracks (Billboard)	60

== Certifications ==
Certifications for "Original Prankster"
Region	Certification	Certified units/sales
Australia (ARIA)	Platinum	70,000^{^}
United Kingdom (BPI)	Silver	200,000^{‡}
^{^} Shipments figures based on certification alone.^{‡} Sales+streaming figures based on certification alone.

== Release history ==
Release dates and formats for "Original Prankster"
Region	Date	Format(s)	Label(s)	Ref(s).
United States	October 10, 2000	Mainstream rock; active rock radio	Columbia	
Japan	October 25, 2000	CD	Epic	
Europe	October 30, 2000	CD	Epic	
United Kingdom	November 6, 2000	CD; cassette	Columbia	
United States	November 14, 2000	Contemporary hit radio	Columbia	
New Zealand	November 27, 2000	CD	Columbia	
