= Gone Away (song) =

1997 single by the Offspring

Single by the Offspring

from the album Ixnay on the Hombre
- B-side: "D.U.I"
- Released: March 1997
- Recorded: 1996
- Genre: Alternative rock; punk rock
- Length: 4:28
- Label: Columbia
- Songwriter: Dexter Holland
- Producer: Dave Jerden

The Offspring singles chronology
"All I Want" (1997)	"Gone Away" (1997)	"The Meaning of Life" (1997)

Music video
- "Gone Away" on YouTube

"Gone Away" is a song by American rock band the Offspring. Written by the band's singer, Dexter Holland, it is the seventh track on the band's fourth studio album, Ixnay on the Hombre (1997), and was released as its second single. It also appears as the sixth track on Greatest Hits (2005). A piano version of the song features as the eleventh track on the group's tenth studio album Let the Bad Times Roll (2021).

The lyrics were reportedly inspired by a real life incident in which singer Dexter Holland and his wife were shaken up after having to seek cover when an ice cream shop they were in was fired upon by gang members. Though no one was killed, Holland told the Bob Lefsetz Podcast, "The idea that we came so close to death was a real life-changing moment. It was right when we were recording Ixnay and I was coming up with the idea. I knew I wanted it to be heavy, but I didn't know what it was going to be about yet. I know it's not a direct connection, but it made you think about dying and about grief and about what that would feel like, and what if my wife would have been the one?"

The song became the Offspring's first No. 1 on the Hot Mainstream Rock Tracks, while reaching No. 4 on the Hot Modern Rock Tracks chart. Through 2009, the band played "Gone Away" with Holland performing on piano throughout Europe and the United States. Two of the tracks from this single ("D.U.I." and "Hey Joe") appear on the band's 2010 compilation album, Happy Hour!.

Former drummer Ron Welty said in 2002 that "Gone Away" was his favorite song to play live.

== Track listing ==
All tracks are written by Dexter Holland, except where noted.

CD single
No.	Title	Length
1.	"Gone Away" (single version)	4:27
2.	"Cool to Hate"	2:46
3.	"D.U.I." (music by Dexter Holland, lyrics by Kevin "Noodles" Wasserman)	2:27
4.	"Hey Joe" (Billy Roberts cover; written by Billy Roberts)	2:37

7" black vinyl
No.	Title	Length
1.	"Gone Away" (single version)	4:27
2.	"D.U.I."	2:27

Promo CD
No.	Title	Length
1.	"Gone Away" (single version)	4:27

== Personnel ==
=== The Offspring ===
- Dexter Holland – vocals, guitar
- Noodles – guitar
- Greg K. – bass
- Ron Welty – drums

== Certifications and sales ==
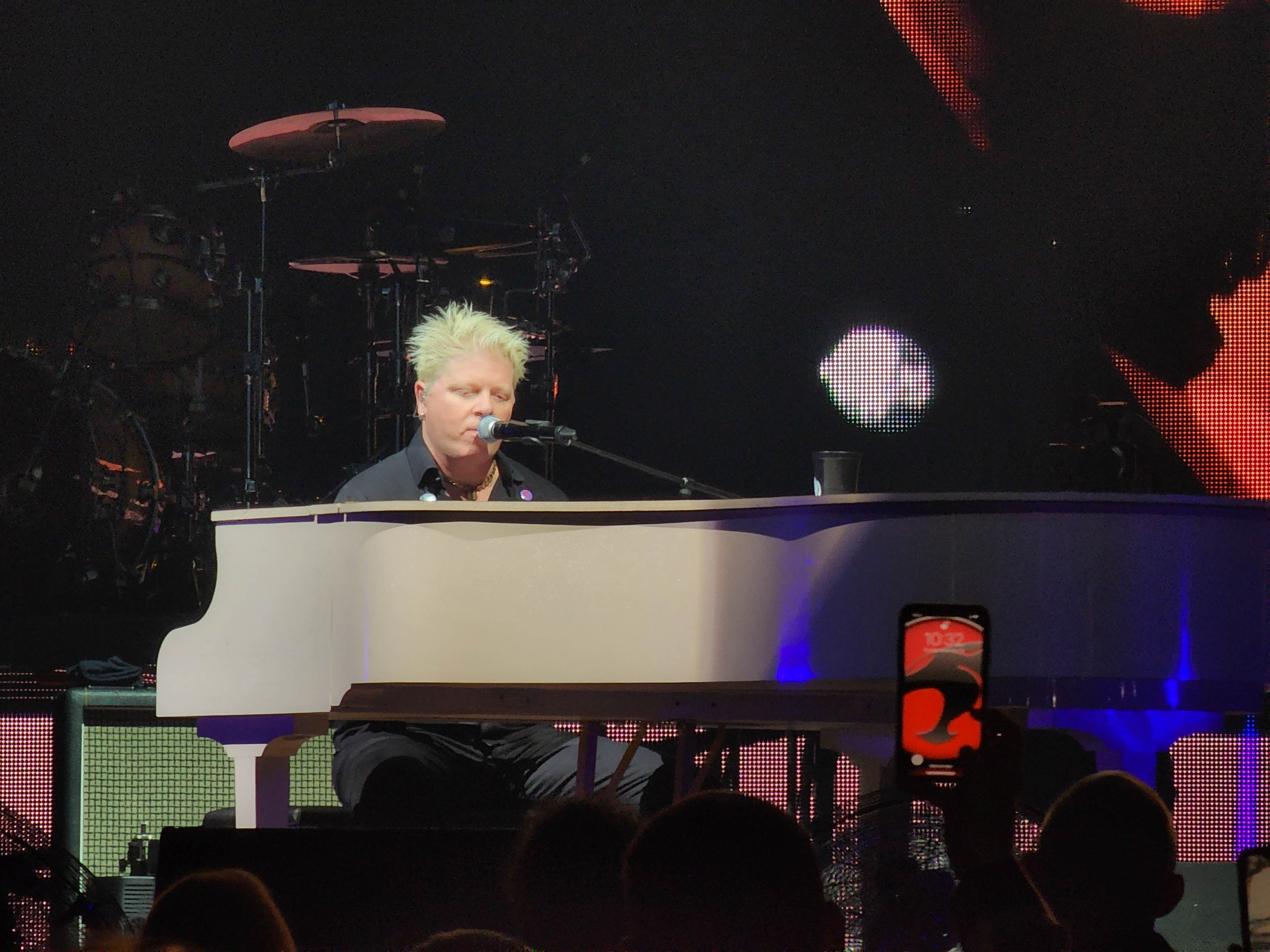
Dexter Holland performing "Gone Away" during a 2022 concert

The single was certified platinum by the RIAA on November 14, 2025. It was also certified Gold in Australia by the ARIA and New Zealand by the RMNZ.

== Music video ==
The music video, shot in grainy quality, was directed by Nigel Dick and was filmed on February 11, 1997 at the Morrell Meat Building in Los Angeles. It shows the band playing in a dark, and apparently abandoned slaughterhouse. Dexter Holland, for most of the video, sings to a shining hanging light bulb. He is the only band member to interact with this bulb, though other lightbulbs are shown in each band member's respective rooms. Holland also sings into a suspended microphone, which swings back and forth as the video fades to black.

=== DVD appearances ===
The music video appears on the Complete Music Video Collection DVD, released in 2005. The DVD also contains a storyboard version of the video (with the storyboard playing over top the music video).

== 2021 version ==
"Gone Away"

Single by the Offspring

from the album Let the Bad Times Roll
- Released: November 12, 2021
- Recorded: 2013–2020
- Genre: Orchestral rock
- Length: 3:16
- Label: Concord
- Songwriter: Dexter Holland
- Producer: Bob Rock

The Offspring singles chronology
"We Never Have Sex Anymore" (2021)	"Gone Away" (2021)	"Behind Your Walls" (2022)

The Offspring remade "Gone Away" for their tenth studio album, Let the Bad Times Roll (2021). The song is a stripped-down piano ballad version of the original version from 1997 and was released as the fourth single of the album.

=== Track listing ===
All tracks are written by Dexter Holland.

No.	Title	Length
1.	"Gone Away (2021)"	3:16
2.	"Gone Away (Live 2021)"	3:42
3.	"Gone Away (Alternative 2021)"	3:16
4.	"Gone Away (1997)"	4:28
Total length:		14:02

== Charts ==
=== Weekly charts ===
Chart (1997)	Peak position
Australia (ARIA)	16
Australia Alternative (ARIA)	4
Canada Top Singles (RPM)	28
Canada Rock/Alternative (RPM)	6
Germany (GfK)	93
Netherlands (Single Top 100)	93
New Zealand (Recorded Music NZ)	35
UK Singles (Official Charts)	42
US Radio Songs (Billboard)	50
US Alternative Airplay (Billboard)	4
US Mainstream Rock Airplay (Billboard)	1

=== Year-end charts ===
Chart (1997)	Position
Australia (ARIA)	86
US Mainstream Rock Tracks (Billboard)	2
US Modern Rock Tracks (Billboard)	24

== Certifications ==
Region	Certification	Certified units/sales
Australia (ARIA)	Gold	35,000^{^}
New Zealand (RMNZ)	Platinum	30,000^{‡}
United States (RIAA)	Platinum	1,000,000^{‡}
^{^} Shipments figures based on certification alone.^{‡} Sales+streaming figures based on certification alone.

== Notable cover versions ==
- Five Finger Death Punch covered the song on their 2017 compilation album, A Decade of Destruction, and on their 2018 studio album, And Justice for None. Their version peaked at No. 2 on Billboard's Mainstream Rock Airplay chart in April 2018.
