= The Kids Aren't Alright =

1999 single by the Offspring

Single by the Offspring

from the album Americana
- Released: August 9, 1999
- Genre: Punk rock; skate punk; pop-punk
- Length: 3:00
- Label: Columbia
- Songwriter: Dexter Holland
- Producer: Dave Jerden

The Offspring singles chronology
"Why Don't You Get a Job?" (1999)	"The Kids Aren't Alright" (1999)	"She's Got Issues" (1999)

Music video
- "The Kids Aren't Alright" on YouTube

Alternative cover

"The Kids Aren't Alright" is a song by American punk rock band the Offspring. It is the fifth track from the band's fifth studio album, Americana (1998), and was released as its third single. It became another top 10 hit on the US Modern Rock Tracks chart.

The song was played over the end credits of Woodstock 99: Peace, Love, and Rage. The song was used in the opening scene of the film The Faculty and appears on the soundtrack album. It is also available as downloadable content for the Rock Band video game series.

Q reported that the song's title is an allusion to the Who song "The Kids Are Alright" (from My Generation). The magazine also argued that the track "borrows heavily" from "Electricity" by Orchestral Manoeuvres in the Dark, and pointed to NOFX's punk rock cover of "Electricity" as evidence.

== Composition ==
The song lyrics tell the stories of several people from a town and the problems they faced growing up (unplanned pregnancy, unemployment, drug addiction, and suicide). Dexter Holland wrote the song after visiting his home town, Garden Grove, California, and discovering many of his old acquaintances had faced serious problems. Holland stated: "The neighborhood looks like Happy Days, but it's really Twin Peaks," while guitarist Noodles said that the song subverted the idea that "you grow up hoping you and your friends have a bright future."

== Track listing ==
=== Original pressing ===
No.	Title	Length
1.	"The Kids Aren't Alright"	3:00
2.	"Pretty Fly (for a White Guy)" (Live)
3.	"Walla Walla" (Live)

=== Alternative pressing ===
No.	Title	Length
1.	"The Kids Aren't Alright"	3:00
2.	"Pretty Fly (for a White Guy)" (Live)
3.	"Walla Walla" (Live)
4.	"Pretty Fly (for a White Guy)" (CD Extra Video)

=== Second alternative pressing ===
No.	Title	Length
1.	"The Kids Aren't Alright"	3:00
2.	"Pretty Fly (for a White Guy)" (Live)
3.	"Walla Walla" (Live)
4.	"Why Don't You Get a Job?" (Live)

=== Third alternative pressing ===
No.	Title	Length
1.	"The Kids Aren't Alright"	3:00
2.	"Walla Walla" (Live)
3.	"Pretty Fly (for a White Guy)" (CD Extra Video)

=== Promo CD ===
No.	Title	Length
1.	"The Kids Aren't Alright"	3:00

Cassette single

No.	Title	Length
1.	"The Kids Aren't Alright"	3:00
2.	"Pretty Fly (For a White Guy)" (Live)	3:10

== Personnel ==
=== The Offspring ===
- Dexter Holland – vocals, guitar
- Noodles – guitar
- Greg K. – bass
- Ron Welty – drums

== Music video ==
The music video features a room with a background of abandonment or family activity at different times. In the center of the room, there are scenes of various persons, including appearances by Bif Naked, Jonny Lee Miller, and Tom Lenk, doing stereotypical things and moves; occasionally band members appear. The camera pans around the room and the scenes constantly morph between each other.

The background can be seen shifting between two time lines, one where the scene is the past, where things are new and clean, and modern days, when it is dreary and drab, the room is run-down and the house is possibly abandoned.

The music video, directed by Yariv Gaber, released a month before the CD single, received heavy airplay on MTV. It was later nominated for Best Direction on the MTV Video Music Awards.

=== DVD appearances ===
The music video also appears on the Complete Music Video Collection DVD, released in 2004.

== Album art ==
The album art features two different drawings for this song. The first depicts a scarecrow falling into the tentacles shown prominently in other single and album covers from Americana. This art also appeared in the accompanying booklet for the album (however, this drawing appeared with the song "Have You Ever"). The second, alternative cover shows a young child reaching for a gun, with ominous blood near to it (the drawing that appears with the song in the Americana booklet).

== Critical reception ==
"The Kids Aren't Alright" is widely considered one of the Offspring's best songs. In 2012, Loudwire ranked the song number three on their list of the 10 greatest Offspring songs, and in 2021, Kerrang! ranked the song number one on their list of the 20 greatest Offspring songs.

== Other versions ==
Live versions of the song were released with "Want You Bad" and "Hit That". A remix (by the Wiseguys) appeared as the b-side to "She's Got Issues" and was later included on the Greatest Hits album. The download version of Splinter (2003) included "The Kids Aren't Alright (Island Style)", an instrumental version of the song featuring ukulele and steel guitar. It is also available on the Enhanced CD version of the album under the folder MP3.

Evergreen Terrace recorded a version of the song for their 2004 covers album, Writer's Block. The same year, the Massachusetts Institute of Technology a cappella group Logarhythms recorded the song for their album Soundproof. Chris Webby's "Fragile Lives" samples the song's chorus and uses a similar four-chord progression.

== Charts ==
=== Weekly charts ===
Weekly chart performance for "The Kids Aren't Alright"
Chart (1999)	Peak position
Australia (ARIA)	69
Belgium (Ultratop 50 Wallonia)	43
Europe (Eurochart Hot 100)	35
France (SNEP)	32
Germany (GfK)	45
Netherlands (Dutch Top 40)	27
Netherlands (Single Top 100)	29
New Zealand (Recorded Music NZ)	39
Scottish Singles Sales (Official Charts)	9
Sweden (Sverigetopplistan)	16
UK Singles (Official Charts)	11
US Bubbling Under Hot 100 (Billboard)	5
US Alternative Airplay (Billboard)	6
US Mainstream Rock (Billboard)	11

=== Year-end charts ===
Year-end chart performance for "The Kids Aren't Alright"
Chart (1999)	Position
Netherlands (Dutch Top 40)	194

== Certifications ==
Certifications and sales for "The Kids Aren't Alright"
Region	Certification	Certified units/sales
Australia (ARIA)	Gold	35,000^{‡}
Brazil (Pro-Música Brasil)	Gold	30,000^{‡}
Denmark (IFPI Danmark)	Gold	45,000^{‡}
Germany (BVMI)	Platinum	600,000^{‡}
Italy (FIMI)	Platinum	50,000^{‡}
New Zealand (RMNZ)	2× Platinum	60,000^{‡}
Poland (ZPAV)	Gold	25,000^{‡}
Spain (Promusicae)	Platinum	60,000^{‡}
United Kingdom (BPI)	Platinum	600,000^{‡}
United States (RIAA)	3× Platinum	3,000,000^{‡}
^{‡} Sales+streaming figures based on certification alone.
