= The Meaning of Life (The Offspring song) =

Single by the Offspring

from the album Ixnay on the Hombre
- Released: August 1997
- Recorded: 1996
- Genre: Skate punk
- Length: 2:56
- Label: Columbia
- Songwriter: Dexter Holland
- Producer: Dave Jerden

The Offspring singles chronology
"Gone Away" (1997)	"The Meaning of Life" (1997)	"I Choose" (1997)

"The Meaning of Life" is a song released by the American punk rock band the Offspring. It appears as the second track on their fourth studio album, Ixnay on the Hombre (1997), and was released as its third single in Australia and Japan. The single peaked at #90 on the Australian ARIA singles chart in August 1997.

== Music video ==
A music video was made in support of the single. It was directed by Kevin Kerslake and released in 1997. The video features a high-speed wheel chair race in the desert. The race footage was interspersed with shots of lead singer Dexter Holland hanging upside down in a tree with a capuchin monkey.

=== DVD appearances ===
The music video appears on the Complete Music Video Collection DVD, released in 2005.

== Track listing ==
=== CD single ===
No.	Title	Length
1.	"The Meaning of Life"	2:55
2.	"I Got a Right" (The Stooges cover)	2:19
3.	"Smash It Up" (Live, The Damned cover)	3:23

=== Promo CD ===
No.	Title	Length
1.	"The Meaning of Life"	2:56

== Charts ==
Chart (1997)	Peak position
Australia (ARIA)	90
