= Why Don't You Get a Job? =

1999 single by the Offspring

Single by the Offspring

from the album Americana
- B-side: "Beheaded (1999)"
- Released: March 15, 1999
- Genre: Pop-punk; ska punk
- Length: 2:51
- Label: Columbia
- Songwriter: Dexter Holland
- Producer: Dave Jerden

The Offspring singles chronology
"Pretty Fly (For a White Guy)" (1998)	"Why Don't You Get a Job?" (1999)	"The Kids Aren't Alright" (1999)

Music video
- "Why Don't You Get a Job?" on YouTube

"Why Don't You Get a Job?" is a song by American rock band the Offspring. The song is the 11th track on the Offspring's fifth studio album, Americana (1998), and was released as its second single on March 15, 1999. The song also appears as the eighth track on the band's Greatest Hits album (2005). The single peaked within the top 10 of the charts in several countries, including reaching number two in the United Kingdom, Australia, Iceland, and Sweden.

The song drew attention from multiple music writers for its similarities to the song "Ob-La-Di, Ob-La-Da", the Beatles' 1968 hit from their self-titled double album (also known as the White Album).

== Music video ==
The music video, directed by McG, was shot on the backlot of Universal Studios Hollywood. Lead singer Dexter Holland hang-glides down to a suburban street and starts singing acapella while walking down the street, beats are soon added by a girl with a boombox, the rest of the band and a man playing the steelpan. As the video progress, the group walks through several TV and movie set locations, such as Colonial Street and Courthouse Square. More and more people join them as the video progress into an impromptu parade, including a marching band, female contestants walking out on the filming of a dating game show, and both friends with terrible partners discussed in the song. Eventually the crowd walks up to a large red button labelled "Do not push" which Holland presses. This triggers an explosion and the crowd scatters in a panic.

Several cameos are featured: Bob Eubanks hosts the parody dating show, Chris "X-13" Higgins and Pussycat Dolls member Carmit Bachar are the deadbeat boyfriend and his girlfriend mentioned in the third verse, and Guy Cohen, who played the main character in the "Pretty Fly (for a White Guy)" video, makes an appearance shortly before the video ends. The video appears on the Complete Music Video Collection DVD, released in 2005.

== Track listings ==
Australia CD maxi

No.	Title	Length
1.	"Why Don't You Get a Job?"	2:51
2.	"Pretty Fly (for a White Guy)" (Lowriders Remix)	3:03
3.	"Beheaded (1999)"	2:39
4.	""Pretty Fly (for a White Guy)"" (Music Video in the CD-ROM)	3:09

Part 2

No.	Title	Length
1.	"Why Don't You Get a Job?"	2:51
2.	"Why Don't You Get a Job?" (The Baka Boyz Remix)	4:24
3.	"Beheaded (1999)"	2:39
4.	"I Wanna Be Sedated" (Ramones Cover)	2:21

Later version

No.	Title	Length
1.	"Why Don't You Get a Job?"	2:51
2.	"Beheaded (1999)"	2:39
3.	"I Wanna Be Sedated" (Ramones Cover)	2:21

== Personnel ==
=== The Offspring ===
- Dexter Holland – vocals, rhythm guitar
- Noodles – guitar
- Greg K. – bass
- Ron Welty – drums

=== Additional musicians ===
- Gabrial McNair – horn
- Álvaro Macías – vihuela
- Phil Jordan – horn
- Carlos Gómez – guitar
- Derrick Davis – flute

== Charts ==
=== Weekly charts ===
Chart (1999)	Peak position
Argentina	3
Australia (ARIA)	2
Austria (Ö3 Austria Top 40)	16
Belgium (Ultratop 50 Flanders)	17
Belgium (Ultratop 50 Wallonia)	25
Canada Top Singles (RPM)	19
Canada Rock/Alternative (RPM)	4
Denmark (Hitlisten)	13
Europe (Eurochart Hot 100)	6
Finland (Suomen virallinen lista)	14
France (SNEP)	29
Germany (GfK)	16
Greece (IFPI)	10
Iceland (Íslenski Listinn Topp 40)	2
Ireland (IRMA)	10
Italy (Musica e dischi)	12
Latvia (Latvijas Top 40)	2
Lithuania (M-1)	1
Netherlands (Dutch Top 40)	5
Netherlands (Single Top 100)	6
New Zealand (Recorded Music NZ)	4
Norway (VG-lista)	6
Quebec Airplay (ADISQ)	13
Scottish Singles Sales (Official Charts)	1
Sweden (Sverigetopplistan)	2
Switzerland (Schweizer Hitparade)	24
UK Singles (Official Charts)	2
UK Rock & Metal (Official Charts)	1
US Billboard Hot 100	74
US Alternative Airplay (Billboard)	4
US Mainstream Rock (Billboard)	10
US Pop Airplay (Billboard)	21

Chart (2017)	Peak position
Poland Airplay (ZPAV)	96

=== Year-end charts ===
Chart (1999)	Position
Australia (ARIA)	9
Belgium (Ultratop 50 Flanders)	94
Belgium (Ultratop 50 Wallonia)	95
Canada Rock/Alternative (RPM)	29
Europe (Eurochart Hot 100)	85
Netherlands (Dutch Top 40)	57
Netherlands (Single Top 100)	46
Romania (Romanian Top 100)	27
Sweden (Hitlistan)	11
UK Singles (OCC)	117
US Mainstream Rock Tracks (Billboard)	38
US Mainstream Top 40 (Billboard)	91
US Modern Rock Tracks (Billboard)	14

== Certifications ==
Region	Certification	Certified units/sales
Australia (ARIA)	2× Platinum	140,000^{^}
Italy (FIMI)	Gold	50,000^{‡}
New Zealand (RMNZ)	Platinum	30,000^{‡}
Spain (Promusicae)	Gold	30,000^{‡}
Sweden (GLF)	Gold	15,000^{^}
United Kingdom (BPI)	Gold	400,000^{‡}
United States (RIAA)	Platinum	1,000,000^{‡}
^{^} Shipments figures based on certification alone.^{‡} Sales+streaming figures based on certification alone.

== Release history ==
Region	Date	Format(s)	Label(s)	Ref.
United States	January 25, 1999	Active rock radio	Columbia	
Australia	March 15, 1999	CD	Columbia	
United States	March 23, 1999	Contemporary hit radio	Columbia	
Europe	March 30, 1999	CD	Columbia	
United Kingdom	April 26, 1999	CD; cassette	Columbia	
Japan	June 19, 1999	CD	Epic	

== Cover versions ==
Australian country singer John Williamson covered the song as part of the Andrew Denton's Musical Challenge album in 2000

South African singer Snotkop translated the song into Afrikaans as "Kry jou ass by die werk" (radio edit titled "Kry jouself by die werk").
