= Jugular Street Luge Racing =

1999 video game

- Developer: nFusion Interactive
- Publisher: HeadGames Publishing
- Platform: Microsoft Windows
- Release: December 14, 1999 (Microsoft Windows)
- Genre: Racing (Street luge)
- Modes: Single-player, multiplayer

Jugular Street Luge Racing is an offline luge racing game developed by nFusion Interactive and published by HeadGames Entertainment in North America on December 14, 1999, as another addition to the eXTreme Games series. The game was released with an ESRB rating of E.

== Gameplay ==
The game tasks the player racing down various courses in a street luge, playing as either Sean "The Duck" Mallard or Wade Sokol. The player must avoid various obstacles, and must also maintain control of their luge, and try to prevent rolling off of the course. Obstacles can include dogs, other players, and cars. There are 13 playable maps, each one having different landscapes and background, along with different course design. The game features two modes, practice mode and season mode. In practice mode, the player can race down the courses at their leisure, minus the obstacles featured in season mode as well as no opponents. In season mode the player races against opponents for cash, which they can use to upgrade their luge. Also, obstacles are present in this game mode. The game features music by The Offspring, with their album Ixnay on the Hombre. The tracks "Mota", "All I Want", and "Leave it Behind" being featured in the game.

== Reception ==
The game had poor reception to most critics and players. PC Player gave it a low 48/100, GameStar 41/100, and PC Joker 39/100. Many critics cited lack of interesting gameplay and the small scale of the game as reasons for its poor reception.

== Development ==
The game was developed by nFusion Interactive and published by HeadGames Entertainment (now a subsidiary of Activision). The game was originally developed for Microsoft Windows, but later released on the PlayStation 2.
