= Pretty Fly (For a White Guy) =

1998 single by the Offspring

- Standard artwork

Single by the Offspring

from the album Americana
- B-side: "No Brakes"; "All I Want" (live)
- Released: November 9, 1998
- Genre: Punk rock; pop-punk; alternative rock; comedy rock
- Length: 3:07
- Label: Columbia
- Songwriters: Dexter Holland; Steve Clark; Joe Elliott; Robert John "Mutt" Lange
- Producer: Dave Jerden

The Offspring singles chronology
"I Choose" (1997)	"Pretty Fly (For a White Guy)" (1998)	"Why Don't You Get a Job?" (1999)

Music video
- "Pretty Fly (for a White Guy)" on YouTube

"Pretty Fly (For a White Guy)" is a song by American rock band the Offspring. It is the fourth track from the band's fifth studio album, Americana (1998), and was released as its first single in November 1998. The song peaked at number 53 on the US Billboard Hot 100, number five on the Billboard Mainstream Rock Tracks chart, and number three on the Billboard Modern Rock Tracks chart. It was successful internationally, reaching number one in 10 countries, including Australia, where it stayed at number one for six weeks and was certified quadruple platinum. It later appeared on the Offspring's 2005 Greatest Hits album.

== Composition and lyrics ==
Beginning with a sample of the pseudo-German nonsense phrase "Gunter glieben glauchen globen" from Def Leppard's 1983 song "Rock of Ages", chanted as a replacement for the traditional "1, 2, 3, 4" to start the recording, the song ridicules a "wannabe gangsta" who is immersed in hip-hop culture, not because he truly loves or understands it but because it is trendy, makes him feel tough ("Friends say he's tryin' too hard, and he's not quite hip/But in his own mind, he's the, he's the dopest trip") and because he believes it attracts women ("and all the girlies say I'm pretty fly, for a white guy"). Holland also got inspiration from a time he went to Starbucks and saw the example of a wannabe gangster the song portrays. The "Give it to me baby" verse was done by voice actress Nika Futterman and Heidi Villagran.

As summed up by Dexter Holland, the people described in the lyrics "are from, like, Omaha, Nebraska, regular white-bread boys, but who act like they're from Compton. It's so fake and obvious that they're trying to have an identity." Holland detailed that he meets many teenagers like those in his native Orange County, "going to the mall, where they buy FUBU, Tommy Hilfiger, and Ice Cube's latest record." Given rap culture is the starting point, Holland clarified that it was not an attack on African-Americans, but "posers of any kind", but without wanting "to be preachy about it... We're getting amusement out of it more than anything else." When asked about the musical similarities with the Offspring's previous hit "Come Out and Play", Holland said he expected comparisons but added that the band attempted to "take it further than 'Come Out and Play'", with a particular focus on more percussion.

== Critical reception ==
Daily Record commented that on "Pretty Fly (For a White Guy)", the band "has obviously been inspired by early-Beastie Boys and Run DMC songs." In Australia, it was ranked at number one on the Triple J Hottest 100 of 1998.

== Music video ==
The music video for the song, directed by McG, begins with the "white guy" and some girls singing the opening lines, and Offspring guitarist Noodles walking on the pavement with his guitar, playing the introductory riff. The "white guy" drives through town in his lowrider and tries to act cool in front of African-Americans, playing with his car's hydraulic system and interrupting a break dance session to dance himself. He is then carried by a group of girls to a pool party and thrown into the pool. He jumps out of the pool and finds some bikini-clad dancers in front of him. These scenes are cut with the band playing. The video ends with the "white guy" returning home and scaring his little sister, who is wearing a fairy costume, because of his dishevelled appearance.

According to Dexter Holland, the band wanted Seth Green to play the "white guy", but he was unavailable. After seeing an audition tape with "five unknowns", they settled on Israeli actor Guy Cohen, who went on to cameo in the "Why Don't You Get a Job?" video and occasionally appear at Offspring concerts.

=== DVD appearances ===
The music video also appears on the Complete Music Video Collection DVD. It was released in 2005. The DVD also contains a storyboard version of the video, in which the storyboard plays over top of the music video.

== Track listings ==
US 7-inch single and UK cassette single

No.	Title	Length
1.	"Pretty Fly (For a White Guy)"	3:08
2.	"Pretty Fly (For a White Guy)" (The Geek mix)	3:01

Australian CD single

No.	Title	Length
1.	"Pretty Fly (For a White Guy)"
2.	"Pretty Fly (For a White Guy)" (The Geek mix)
3.	"No Brakes"

European CD single

No.	Title	Length
1.	"Pretty Fly (For a White Guy)" (album version)	3:08
2.	"Pretty Fly (For a White Guy)" (The Geek mix)	3:07

UK CD1

No.	Title	Length
1.	"Pretty Fly (For a White Guy)"	3:08
2.	"Pretty Fly (For a White Guy)" (The Baka Boyz remix)	3:01
3.	"No Brakes"	2:02

UK CD2

No.	Title	Length
1.	"Pretty Fly (For a White Guy)"	3:08
2.	"Pretty Fly (For a White Guy)" (The Geek mix)	3:01
3.	"All I Want" (live)	2:02

Italian 12-inch single

No.	Title	Length
1.	"Pretty Fly (For a White Guy)"	3:08
2.	"Pretty Fly (For a White Guy)" (The Geek mix)	3:07
3.	"Pretty Fly (For a White Guy)" (The Baka Boys remix)	3:01
4.	"All I Want" (live)	2:02

== Personnel ==
The Offspring

- Dexter Holland – vocals, guitar
- Noodles – guitar, backing vocals
- Greg K. – bass
- Ron Welty – drums

Additional musicians

- Chris "X-13" Higgins – additional vocals
- Heidi Villagran and Nika Frost – additional vocals

== Charts ==
=== Weekly charts ===
Weekly chart performance for "Pretty Fly (For a White Guy)"
Chart (1998–1999)	Peak position
Australia (ARIA)	1
Australia Alternative (ARIA)	1
Austria (Ö3 Austria Top 40)	2
Belgium (Ultratop 50 Flanders)	1
Belgium (Ultratop 50 Wallonia)	3
Canada Top Singles (RPM)	9
Denmark (Tracklisten)	2
Europe (Eurochart Hot 100)	2
European Radio Top 50 (Music & Media)	14
Finland (Suomen virallinen lista)	1
France (SNEP)	10
Germany (GfK)	2
Greece (IFPI)	1
Iceland (Íslenski Listinn Topp 40)	24
Ireland (IRMA)	1
Italy (Musica e dischi)	1
Italy Airplay (Music & Media)	10
Mexico International (Notitas Musicales)	3
Netherlands (Dutch Top 40)	1
Netherlands (Single Top 100)	1
Norway (VG-lista)	1
Quebec (ADISQ)	36
Scottish Singles Sales (Official Charts)	1
Sweden (Sverigetopplistan)	1
Switzerland (Schweizer Hitparade)	4
UK Singles (Official Charts)	1
US Billboard Hot 100	53
US Alternative Airplay (Billboard)	3
US Mainstream Rock (Billboard)	5
US Pop Airplay (Billboard)	13
US Rhythmic Airplay (Billboard)	31

=== Year-end charts ===
1998 year-end chart performance for "Pretty Fly (For a White Guy)"
Chart (1998)	Position
Australia (ARIA)	16
Sweden (Hitlistan)	54
US Mainstream Rock Tracks (Billboard)	85
US Modern Rock Tracks (Billboard)	76

1999 year-end chart performance for "Pretty Fly (For a White Guy)"
Chart (1999)	Position
Australia (ARIA)	5
Austria (Ö3 Austria Top 40)	10
Belgium (Ultratop 50 Flanders)	8
Belgium (Ultratop 50 Wallonia)	31
Brazil (Crowley)	88
Canada Top Singles (RPM)	93
Europe (Eurochart Hot 100)	8
France (SNEP)	47
Germany (Media Control)	18
Italy (Musica e dischi)	9
Netherlands (Dutch Top 40)	15
Netherlands (Single Top 100)	10
Romania (Romanian Top 100)	12
Sweden (Hitlistan)	5
Switzerland (Schweizer Hitparade)	16
UK Singles (OCC)	30
US Mainstream Rock Tracks (Billboard)	31
US Mainstream Top 40 (Billboard)	52
US Modern Rock Tracks (Billboard)	21

== Certifications ==
Certifications for "Pretty Fly (For a White Guy)"
Region	Certification	Certified units/sales
Australia (ARIA)	4× Platinum	280,000^{^}
Austria (IFPI Austria)	Gold	25,000^{*}
Belgium (BRMA)	Platinum	50,000^{*}
Denmark (IFPI Danmark)	Gold	45,000^{‡}
France (SNEP)	Silver	125,000^{*}
Germany (BVMI)	Gold	250,000^{^}
Italy (FIMI)	Gold	25,000^{‡}
Netherlands (NVPI)	Gold	50,000^{^}
New Zealand (RMNZ)	2× Platinum	60,000^{‡}
Norway (IFPI Norway)	2× Platinum	
Spain (Promusicae)	Gold	30,000^{‡}
Sweden (GLF)	3× Platinum	90,000^{^}
United Kingdom (BPI)	2× Platinum	1,200,000^{‡}
United States (RIAA)	Platinum	1,000,000^{‡}
^{*} Sales figures based on certification alone.^{^} Shipments figures based on certification alone.^{‡} Sales+streaming figures based on certification alone.

== Release history ==
Release dates and formats for "Pretty Fly (For a White Guy)"
Region	Date	Format(s)	Label(s)	Ref.
United States	October 6, 1998	Mainstream rock; modern rock radio	Columbia	
Australia	November 9, 1998	CD	Columbia	
United States	November 17, 1998	Contemporary hit radio	Columbia	
United Kingdom	January 18, 1999	CD; cassette	Columbia	

== Legacy ==
- The song was parodied by "Weird Al" Yankovic as "Pretty Fly for a Rabbi".
