= All I Want (The Offspring song) =

Single by the Offspring

from the album Ixnay on the Hombre
- B-side: "Way Down the Line"
- Released: January 20, 1997
- Recorded: 1996
- Genre: Melodic hardcore
- Length: 1:55
- Label: Columbia; Epitaph (Europe)
- Songwriter: Dexter Holland
- Producer: Dave Jerden

The Offspring singles chronology
"Smash It Up" (1995)	"All I Want" (1997)	"Gone Away" (1997)

"All I Want" is a song by American punk rock group the Offspring. It is the tenth track on their fourth studio album, Ixnay on the Hombre (1997), and was released as its lead single in January 1997. It reached No. 31 in the United Kingdom and No. 15 in Australia. In the US, it peaked at No. 13 on Modern Rock Tracks. The song also appears as the fifth track on their Greatest Hits (2005). The single was also (at 1:55) the shortest single to be released by the band.

== Origin ==
The song was written by Dexter Holland as part of a (perhaps tongue-in-cheek) Bad Religion songwriting competition at Epitaph Records, under the title Protocol. The song's lyrics originally consisted of significantly complex vocabulary, like many Bad Religion songs. However, when Dexter offered to play it for Epitaph owner and Bad Religion guitarist Brett Gurewitz, he was told to "play it on acoustic later or something." Dexter felt rejected and rewrote the song's lyrics to sound more like an Offspring song.

== Music video ==
The band made a video for the song, which was directed by David Yow of the Jesus Lizard.

The video consisted of shots of the band playing and singing the song mixed with a teenage boy seemingly running away from home, while the band is shown the video is often in psychedelic colors. The boy takes his clothes off down to his boxers while running through his town. At the end of the video he arrives in a park, and falls in a puddle of mud. In between the shots of the band and the shots of the running boy are old, black and white video clips from various situations, including a bicycle race, an airplane crashing into a barn, and a race car ploughing into a crowd.

As confirmed on the Complete Music Video Collection DVD, Buzz Osborne is the man wearing the mask while playing the piano.

=== DVD appearances ===
The music video also appears on the Complete Music Video Collection DVD. It was released in 2005.

== Track listing ==
=== CD single ===
No.	Title	Length
1.	"All I Want"	1:55
2.	"Way Down the Line"	2:37
3.	"Smash It Up" (The Damned cover)	3:25

=== Europe 7" green vinyl ===
No.	Title	Length
1.	"All I Want"	1:55
2.	"Way Down the Line"	2:37

=== Promo CD ===
No.	Title	Length
1.	"All I Want"	1:54

== Personnel ==
=== The Offspring ===
- Dexter Holland – vocals, guitar
- Noodles – guitar
- Greg K. – bass
- Ron Welty – drums

== Charts ==
=== Weekly charts ===
Chart (1997)	Peak position
Australia (ARIA)	15
Australia Alternative (ARIA)	3
Austria (Ö3 Austria Top 40)	25
Canada Rock/Alternative (RPM)	6
Europe (Eurochart Hot 100)	66
Finland (Suomen virallinen lista)	6
Netherlands (Dutch Top 40)	37
Netherlands (Single Top 100)	51
New Zealand (Recorded Music NZ)	27
Norway (VG-lista)	6
Scottish Singles Sales (Official Charts)	29
Spain (AFYVE)	4
Sweden (Sverigetopplistan)	36
UK Singles (Official Charts)	31
UK Rock & Metal (Official Charts)	2
US Alternative Airplay (Billboard)	13
US Mainstream Rock (Billboard)	18

=== Year-end charts ===
Chart (1997)	Position
US Modern Rock Tracks (Billboard)	88

== Appearances in media ==
The song has been heavily associated with Sega's Crazy Taxi video game franchise, being featured in multiple entries including the 1999 original, Crazy Taxi 3: High Roller, Crazy Taxi Tycoon, and Crazy Taxi: World Tour. The song also appears in Jugular Street Luge Racing, and as downloadable content in the Rock Band series. DDT wrestler To-y has used the song as his entrance theme since 2021.

A Flash animation was created based on the fact that the lyric "All I want" in the song is often heard by Japanese listeners as Doraemon.
