= Conspiracy of One =

Studio album by the Offspring
- Released: November 14, 2000
- Recorded: June–August 2000
- Studios: NRG Recording Studios; D-13 Studio, Huntington Beach; North Hollywood
- Genres: Punk rock; skate punk; pop-punk
- Length: 37:44
- Label: Columbia
- Producer: Brendan O'Brien

The Offspring chronology
Americana (1998)	Conspiracy of One (2000)	Splinter (2003)

Singles from Conspiracy of One
- 1. "Original Prankster" Released: October 25, 2000; 2. "Want You Bad" Released: March 5, 2001; 3. "Million Miles Away" Released: June 25, 2001

Conspiracy of One is the sixth studio album by American punk rock band the Offspring, released on November 14, 2000, by Columbia Records. By the time of its release, the band had come out in support of peer-to-peer file sharing, claiming it would not hurt sales. Conspiracy of One was originally planned to be released directly on their website before retail, until Columbia Records threatened to sue and the album ended up as a physical release. The album was the last to feature drummer Ron Welty, who was fired from the band in 2003 and went on to form his own band Steady Ground.

Conspiracy of One debuted at number nine on the US Billboard 200, selling over 125,000 copies in its first week of sales, and spawned the singles "Original Prankster", "Want You Bad", and "Million Miles Away". Although not as successful as their previous album Americana (1998), it was later certified platinum by the RIAA in the United States.

== Background and recording ==
The Offspring spent much of 1999 on tour promoting the Americana album. They also appeared at the infamous Woodstock 1999, where their performance was broadcast live on pay-per-view television. After some time off, the members reconvened in early 2000 to begin work on new material, nine songs of which were in the demo phase at the time. Frontman Dexter Holland told Rolling Stone in May 2000 that, "we came home last Christmas and we kind of took a month just trying to recoup and we started thinking, 'Well, do we want to get started on another record right away?'. "We're all pretty excited about the way things have gone so I spent a couple of months trying to come up with some new material and then [started] jamming out these demos." The Offspring entered the studio to begin recording sessions for Conspiracy of One in June 2000. For the recording of the album, the band tapped Brendan O'Brien as its producer and recorded the album at NRG studios in North Hollywood, California over a two-month period.

== Reception ==
Professional ratings
Aggregate scores
Source	Rating
Metacritic	60/100
Review scores
Source	Rating
AllMusic	3.5/5 stars
Alternative Press	6/10
Drowned in Sound	2/10
Entertainment Weekly	B
NME	1/10
Q	3/5 stars
Rolling Stone	3.5/5 stars
The Rolling Stone Album Guide	3/5 stars
Select	2/5 stars
Spin	7/10

Conspiracy of One was released on November 14, 2000, and peaked at number 9 on the US Billboard 200 album chart. Five weeks after its release, the album was certified gold and platinum. The album was also successful in Canada, selling 25,231 copies in its first week and debuting at No. 4 on the Canadian Albums Chart. The album was certified 2× Platinum by the CRIA in February 2007.

Liana Jonas of AllMusic described Conspiracy of One as the Offspring's "most musically mature collection to date". Jonas praised the music as "tight arrangements, vocal interplay and refined guitar work" and claims the band injected "elements of hip-hop, rap metal, and Nirvana-like grunge into a few songs". The album received a rating of three and a half out of five stars, while producing three singles, "Original Prankster", "Want You Bad" and "Million Miles Away", that earned the Offspring its commercial success. The album holds a score of 60 out of 100 from Metacritic based on "mixed or average reviews". The album was included at number 13 on Rock Sound's "The 51 Most Essential Pop Punk Albums of All Time" list.

== Track listing ==
All tracks are written by Dexter Holland except where noted.

No.	Title	Length
1.	"Intro" (fragment of Mike Love during a 1963 concert of the Beach Boys)	0:06
2.	"Come Out Swinging"	2:47
3.	"Original Prankster" (featuring Redman; contains a sample of "Low Rider" by War)	3:42
4.	"Want You Bad"	3:23
5.	"Million Miles Away"	3:40
6.	"Dammit, I Changed Again"	2:49
7.	"Living in Chaos"	3:28
8.	"Special Delivery" (contains a sample of "Hooked on a Feeling" by Blue Swede)	3:00
9.	"One Fine Day"	2:45
10.	"All Along"	1:39
11.	"Denial, Revisited"	4:33
12.	"Vultures"	3:35
13.	"Conspiracy of One"	2:17
Total length:		37:44

Vinyl edition bonus track
No.	Title	Length
14.	"Huck It"	2:38
Total length:		40:22

Japanese edition bonus tracks
No.	Title	Length
14.	"Huck It"	2:38
15.	"The Kids Aren't Alright" (live)	3:03
Total length:		43:25

== Chart performance ==
=== Weekly charts ===
Weekly chart performance for Conspriacy of One
Chart (2000–01)	Peak position
Argentine Albums (CAPIF)	1
Australian Albums (ARIA)	4
Austrian Albums (Ö3 Austria)	5
Belgian Albums (Ultratop Flanders)	35
Belgian Albums (Ultratop Wallonia)	18
Brazilian Albums (ABPD)	1
Canadian Albums (Billboard)	4
Czech Albums (IFPI)	11
Dutch Albums (Album Top 100)	32
Europe (European Top 100 Albums)	6
Finnish Albums (Suomen virallinen lista)	4
French Albums (SNEP)	3
German Albums (Offizielle Top 100)	8
Greece (IFPI Greece)	3
Hungarian Albums (MAHASZ)	31
Irish Albums (IRMA)	14
Italian Albums (FIMI)	12
Japanese Albums (Oricon)	5
New Zealand Albums (RMNZ)	11
Norwegian Albums (VG-lista)	11
Polish Albums (ZPAV)	7
Portuguese Albums (AFP)	5
Scottish Albums (Official Charts)	10
Spanish Albums (AFYVE)	15
Swedish Albums (Sverigetopplistan)	8
Swiss Albums (Schweizer Hitparade)	4
UK Albums (Official Charts)	12
US Billboard 200	9

=== Year-end charts ===
2000 year-end chart performance for Conspiracy of One
Chart (2000)	Position
Australian Albums (ARIA)	22
Canadian Albums (Nielsen SoundScan)	50
French Albums (SNEP)	39
Swedish Albums (Sverigetopplistan)	65
Swiss Albums (Schweizer Hitparade)	76
UK Albums (OCC)	100

2001 year-end chart performance for Conspiracy of One
Chart (2001)	Position
Australian Albums (ARIA)	38
Austrian Albums (Ö3 Austria)	43
Belgian Albums (Ultratop Wallonia)	75
Canadian Albums (Nielsen SoundScan)	118
European Top 100 Albums (Music & Media)	58
French Albums (SNEP)	113
Swiss Albums (Schweizer Hitparade)	61
UK Albums (OCC)	165
US Billboard 200	94

== Certifications ==
Certifications and sales for Conspiracy of One
Region	Certification	Certified units/sales
Argentina (CAPIF)	Gold	30,000^{^}
Australia (ARIA)	2× Platinum	140,000^{^}
Austria (IFPI Austria)	Gold	25,000^{*}
Belgium (BRMA)	Gold	25,000^{*}
Canada (Music Canada)	2× Platinum	200,000^{^}
Finland (Musiikkituottajat)	Gold	29,330
France (SNEP)	2× Gold	200,000^{*}
Germany (BVMI)	Gold	150,000^{‡}
Japan (RIAJ)	Platinum	200,000^{^}
New Zealand (RMNZ)	Platinum	15,000^{^}
Spain (Promusicae)	Platinum	100,000^{^}
Switzerland (IFPI Switzerland)	Platinum	50,000^{^}
United Kingdom (BPI)	Platinum	300,000^{‡}
United States (RIAA)	Platinum	1,000,000^{^}
Summaries
Europe (IFPI)	Platinum	1,000,000^{*}
^{*} Sales figures based on certification alone.^{^} Shipments figures based on certification alone.^{‡} Sales+streaming figures based on certification alone.

== Personnel ==
The Offspring

- Dexter Holland – vocals, guitar
- Noodles – guitar, backing vocals
- Greg K. – bass, backing vocals
- Ron Welty – drums

Additional musicians

- Redman – additional vocals on "Original Prankster"
- Chris "X-13" Higgins – backing vocals

Production

- Brendan O'Brien – producer, mixing
- Justin Beope – design
- Billy Bowers – engineer
- Nick DiDia – engineer
- David Dominguez – assistant engineer
- Karl Egsieker – mixing
- Ryan Williams – mixing
- Sean Evans – art direction
- Alan Forbes – illustrations
- Ross Garfield – drum technician
- Sarkis Kaloustian – design
- Steve Masi – guitar technician
- Eddy Schreyer – mastering
