= Americana (The Offspring album) =

Studio album by the Offspring
- Released: November 17, 1998
- Recorded: July–September 1998
- Studios: Eldorado Recording, Burbank, California
- Genres: Punk rock; skate punk; pop-punk
- Length: 43:37
- Label: Columbia
- Producer: Dave Jerden

The Offspring chronology
Ixnay on the Hombre (1997)	Americana (1998)	Conspiracy of One (2000)

Singles from Americana
- 1. "Pretty Fly (for a White Guy)" Released: November 9, 1998; 2. "Why Don't You Get a Job?" Released: March 15, 1999; 3. "The Kids Aren't Alright" Released: August 9, 1999; 4. "She's Got Issues" Released: November 22, 1999

Americana is the fifth studio album by American rock band the Offspring, released on November 17, 1998, by Columbia Records. Following a worldwide tour in support of Ixnay on the Hombre (1997), the band commenced work on a new album in July 1998, with the recording sessions lasting for about two months. It was the Offspring's second and last album to be produced by Dave Jerden.

Americana was a major success, debuting at number two on the US Billboard 200 (the highest chart position of any Offspring album), and selling over 198,000 copies in its first week. It is the band's second best-selling album after their 1994 breakout, Smash, and has sold over ten million copies worldwide. Americana spawned the hit singles "Pretty Fly (for a White Guy)", "Why Don't You Get a Job?" and "The Kids Aren't Alright", and was promoted with a worldwide tour that included an appearance at the Woodstock '99 festival.

== Background and recording ==
After the unexpected success of Smash (1994), the Offspring were signed to Columbia Records in 1996, releasing the fourth studio album, Ixnay on the Hombre (1997). Although Ixnay on the Hombre was not as well received as Smash, it managed simultaneous gold and platinum certifications in the United States in April 1997. After touring in support of Ixnay on the Hombre, the Offspring began writing new material for their next album. Frontman Dexter Holland told Rolling Stone in August 1998, "I wanted to write a record that wasn't a radical departure from what we've done before. I feel like we have managed to change stuff up from Ignition to Smash to Ixnay. We're in a place where we more or less set the boundaries where we can do a lot of stuff without having to stretch it out farther ... and do a swing song or something."

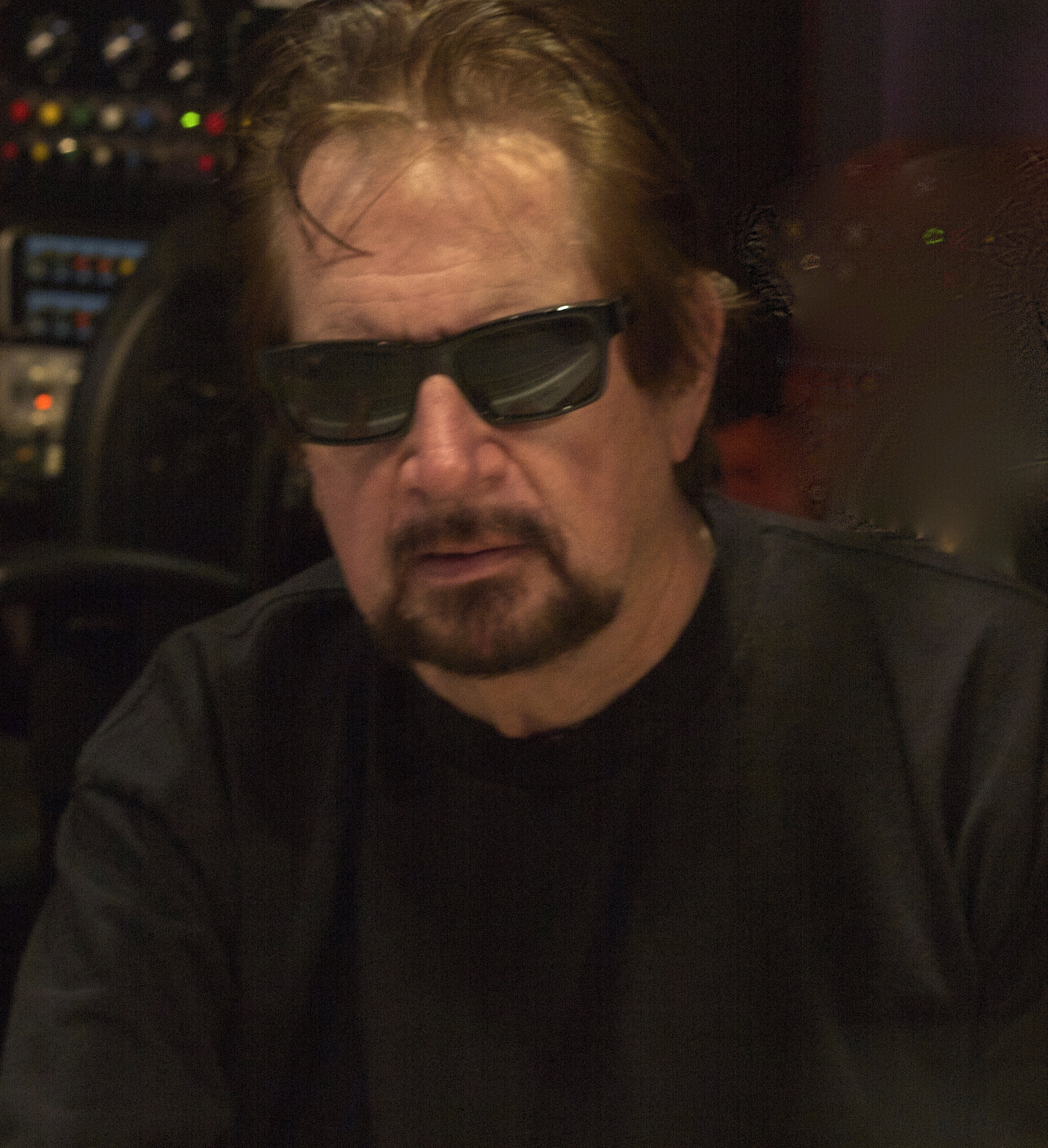
Americana was the second and last album by the Offspring to be produced by Dave Jerden.

Recording took place from July to September 1998 at Eldorado Recording Studios with producer Dave Jerden, who also produced Ixnay on the Hombre. Holland told Guitar World, "The idea wasn't to reinvent the wheel. We expanded our horizons on our last record and that's okay, but I don't feel like you have to be a completely different band on every record." While most songs are the regular punk rock the band popularized, others such as the Latino-influenced "Pretty Fly (for a White Guy)" and the psychedelic "Pay the Man" add variety, "so that there's enough in there so people don't get bored". "Pay the Man" was even left off Ixnay on the Hombre for sounding too different from anything else the band had currently made at that time. The structure of the song more resembles progressive rock (having no repetitive sections and no continuous musical theme).

== Composition ==
"I was thinking about how American culture is distorted really. It's not Norman Rockwell anymore; it's Jerry Springer. It's not living on the farm, it's going to Burger King. So, I kind of expanded on that and made a lot of the songs kind of vignettes of my version of America in 1998"

— Dexter Holland on Americana's lyrics

Americana contains themes of unhappy American lifestyles. Speaking of the album shortly after its release, Holland explained, "The songs on Americana aren't condemnations, they're short stories about the state of things and what we see going on around us. We want to expose the darker side of our culture. It may look like an episode of Happy Days out there in America, but it feels more like Twin Peaks." He detailed that Americana was not thought right away as a concept album and "this really cool social statement", though once the band recorded a few songs complaining about 1998 America, "then we realized we had a theme".

Holland also explained that Americana served as "a commentary on American culture", satirizing hypocritical lives and political correctness. One of the influences was The Jerry Springer Show, with the band even considering naming the album after the show's news tickers such as "Stripper Wars". A major source of inspiration was seeing the people in Holland's hometown of Huntington Beach, such as the "wiggers" who were mocked in "Pretty Fly (for a White Guy)". Despite dealing with aimlessness and disillusionment, derived from how the generation that had just got to adulthood was having problems in getting jobs and sustaining themselves, Holland declared that "I didn't want it to be a record that made you feel hopeless. At the end of the day I hope that you can get something positive out of it."

== Packaging ==
Artist Frank Kozik was hired to do the album artwork, as Holland found that his concert tour posters "had all the connotations we associated with Americana: very glossy, innocent and 1950s, but with a twisted aspect." Kozik, who had known the singer for a long time, was reluctant to work for the band because of how his fans would receive it, and he eventually demanded $75,000 to do the Americana illustrations. The album's cover art features a blond boy with an orthopedic boot seated on a swing holding a sand flea. From out of the frame, a tentacle reaches toward the boy. Kozik had originally done said illustration for a Nebraskan band, Ritual Device, and reused it as the cover of his book Man's Ruin: The Poster Art of Frank Kozik. On the CD booklet, which Holland described as "a little Kozik picture book", every song has its own accompanying illustration.

Some pressings of Americana are also enhanced CDs and contain the karaoke videos of "Staring at the Sun", "Pretty Fly (for a White Guy)" and "Why Don't You Get a Job?", and the previous MTV music videos from its predecessor, Ixnay on the Hombre.

== Release and reception ==
Professional ratings
Review scores
Source	Rating
AllMusic	3/5 stars
The Baltimore Sun	3/4 stars
Entertainment Weekly	B+
Los Angeles Times	2.5/4 stars
NME	3/10
Rolling Stone	3/5 stars
The Rolling Stone Album Guide	3.5/5 stars
Select	4/5
Spin	5/10
The Village Voice	A−

Americana was released on November 17, 1998, and peaked at number 2 on the Billboard 200 album chart, the highest position the band has attained as of 2023. Shortly after its release, the album was certified gold and then later platinum.

The album received mixed reviews. Michael Gallucci of AllMusic described the album as a "raucous ride through America as seen through the eyes of a weary, but still optimistic, young kid". Gallucci praised the music as "a hearty combination of poppy punk" and a "blend of salsa and alterna-rock sounds", stating the band's music was taking a different direction. The album received a rating of three out of five stars, while "Pretty Fly (for a White Guy)", "Why Don't You Get a Job?", "The Kids Aren't Alright" and "She's Got Issues" earned the Offspring its heaviest airplay on MTV and radio stations to date. Entertainment Weekly reviewer Dan Snierson considered Americana as post-punk done right, "with crafty yell-odies and winky lyrics". In his review for the Offspring's next album Conspiracy of One, The A.V. Club critic Stephen Thompson called Americana "the unbearable result being the kind of stupidity that thinks it's clever", considering it "bad enough to create a backlash against not only pop-punk, but also novelty songs, guitars, smug thirtysomethings, and the human race."

Americana is the 224th best selling album of all time according to Billboard as of 2009. The album was included in Rock Sound's 101 Modern Classics list at number 79. The album was included at number 23 on Rock Sound's "The 51 Most Essential Pop Punk Albums of All Time" list. NME listed the album as one of "20 Pop Punk Albums Which Will Make You Nostalgic".

The album was named at the 2000 Juno Awards as one of the best-selling albums that year.

== Track listing ==
All tracks are written by Dexter Holland, except "Feelings" (Morris Albert, Louis Felix-Marie Gaste, lyrical parody by Dexter Holland).

No.	Title	Length
1.	"Welcome"	0:09
2.	"Have You Ever"	3:56
3.	"Staring at the Sun"	2:13
4.	"Pretty Fly (For a White Guy)"	3:08
5.	"The Kids Aren't Alright"	3:00
6.	"Feelings" (parody/cover of Morris Albert's 1975 single)	2:52
7.	"She's Got Issues"	3:48
8.	"Walla Walla"	2:57
9.	"The End of the Line"	3:02
10.	"No Brakes"	2:04
11.	"Why Don't You Get a Job?"	2:52
12.	"Americana"	3:15
13.	"Pay the Man"	10:21
Total length:		43:37

- "Pretty Fly (For a White Guy)" contains a sample of "Rock of Ages" by Def Leppard, written by Joe Elliott, Steve Clark, and Robert John "Mutt" Lange.
- "Pay the Man" ends at 8:10, followed by silence, then the hidden track, "Pretty Fly (Reprise)," at 9:15. The hidden track "Pretty Fly (Reprise)" is a mariachi reprise of the song "Pretty Fly (for a White Guy)." The digital version of Americana has "Pay the Man" and "Pretty Fly (Reprise)" separately, with the reprise as track 14. The main riff on "Pay the Man", particularly the drum part, is the same as found on the title track of Smash during the acoustic version of "Come Out and Play."

== Charts ==
=== Weekly charts ===
Chart (1998–99)	Peak position
Australian Albums (ARIA)	1
Austrian Albums (Ö3 Austria)	1
Belgian Albums (Ultratop Flanders)	4
Belgian Albums (Ultratop Wallonia)	17
Canadian Albums (Billboard)	3
Czech Albums (IFPI)	4
Danish Albums (Hitlisten)	2
Dutch Albums (Album Top 100)	6
European Albums (European Top 100 Albums)	2
Finnish Albums (Suomen virallinen lista)	2
French Albums (SNEP)	2
German Albums (Offizielle Top 100)	5
Greek Albums (IFPI Greece)	1
Hungarian Albums (MAHASZ)	11
Irish Albums (IRMA)	25
Italian Albums (FIMI)	3
Japanese Albums (Oricon)	20
New Zealand Albums (RMNZ)	1
Norwegian Albums (VG-lista)	2
Polish Albums (ZPAV)	1
Portuguese Albums (AFP)	3
Scottish Albums (Official Charts)	92
Singapore Albums (SPVA)	3
Spanish Albums (AFYVE)	8
Swedish Albums (Sverigetopplistan)	1
Swiss Albums (Schweizer Hitparade)	5
UK Albums (Official Charts)	10
UK Rock & Metal Albums (Official Charts)	1
US Billboard 200	2

=== Year-end charts ===
Chart (1998)	Position
Australian Albums (ARIA)	22
Swedish Albums & Compilations (Sverigetopplistan)	74

Chart (1999)	Position
Australian Albums (ARIA)	3
Austrian Albums (Ö3 Austria)	1
Belgian Albums (Ultratop Flanders)	14
Belgian Albums (Ultratop Wallonia)	31
Canadian Albums (RPM)	5
Danish Albums (Hitlisten)	14
Dutch Albums (Album Top 100)	21
European Albums (Music & Media)	3
French Albums (SNEP)	9
German Albums (Offizielle Top 100)	9
Italian Albums (FIMI)	23
New Zealand Albums (RMNZ)	8
Spanish Albums (AFYPE)	49
Swedish Albums & Compilations (Sverigetopplistan)	5
Swiss Albums (Schweizer Hitparade)	17
UK Albums (OCC)	50
US Billboard 200	7

=== Decade-end charts ===
Chart (1990–1999)	Position
US Billboard 200	75

== Certifications ==
Sales certifications for Americana
Region	Certification	Certified units/sales
Argentina (CAPIF)	Platinum	60,000^{^}
Australia (ARIA)	5× Platinum	350,000^{^}
Austria (IFPI Austria)	Platinum	50,000^{*}
Belgium (BRMA)	Gold	25,000^{*}
Brazil (Pro-Música Brasil)	Platinum	250,000^{*}
Canada (Music Canada)	8× Platinum	800,000^{^}
Finland (Musiikkituottajat)	Platinum	52,798
France (SNEP)	2× Platinum	600,000^{*}
Germany (BVMI)	Gold	250,000^{^}
Italy (FIMI) sales since 2009	Platinum	50,000^{‡}
Japan (RIAJ)	Platinum	200,000^{^}
Mexico (AMPROFON)	Gold	100,000^{^}
Netherlands (NVPI)	Gold	50,000^{^}
New Zealand (RMNZ)	4× Platinum	60,000^{^}
New Zealand (RMNZ) Reissue	Platinum	15,000^{‡}
Norway (IFPI Norway)	Platinum	50,000^{*}
Poland (ZPAV)	Platinum	100,000^{*}
Spain (Promusicae)	Platinum	100,000^{^}
Sweden (GLF)	2× Platinum	160,000^{^}
Switzerland (IFPI Switzerland)	Platinum	50,000^{^}
United Kingdom (BPI)	Platinum	300,000^{^}
United States (RIAA)	5× Platinum	5,000,000^{^}
Summaries
Europe (IFPI)	3× Platinum	3,000,000^{*}
Latin America	—	600,000
Worldwide	—	10,000,000+
^{*} Sales figures based on certification alone.^{^} Shipments figures based on certification alone.^{‡} Sales+streaming figures based on certification alone.

== Personnel ==
Credits are adapted from the album's liner notes.

The Offspring

- Dexter Holland – vocals, guitar
- Noodles – guitar, backing vocals
- Greg K. – bass
- Ron Welty – drums

Production

- Dave Jerden – producer, mixing
- Bryan Carlstrom – engineer
- Annette Cisneros – assistant engineer
- Eddy Schreyer – mastering

Artwork

- Sean Evans – art direction
- Justin Beope – artwork
- Frank Kozik – artwork

Additional musicians

- Chris "X-13" Higgins – backing vocals, additional vocals on "Pretty Fly (For a White Guy)"
- Heidi Villagran and Nika Frost – additional vocals on "Pretty Fly (For a White Guy)"
- Calvert DeForest – spoken word on "Why Don't You Get a Job?," additional vocals on "Pretty Fly (Reprise)"
- John Mayer – spoken word on "Welcome", additional vocals on "Pretty Fly (Reprise)"
- Davey Havok, Jack Grisham, and Jim Lindberg – backing vocals
- Gabrial McNair – horn on "Why Don't You Get a Job?" and "Pretty Fly (Reprise)"
- Alvaro Macias – vihuela on "Why Don't You Get a Job?" and "Pretty Fly (Reprise)"
- Phil Jordan – horn on "Why Don't You Get a Job?" and "Pretty Fly (Reprise)"
- Carlos Goméz – guitar on "Why Don't You Get a Job?" and "Pretty Fly (Reprise)"
- Derrick Davis – flute on "Why Don't You Get a Job?" and "Pretty Fly (Reprise)"
