= Come Out and Play (The Offspring song) =

1994 single by the Offspring

Single by the Offspring

from the album Smash
- B-side: "Session"; "Come Out and Play" (acoustic)
- Released: August 29, 1994
- Genre: Punk rock; surf rock
- Length: 3:17
- Label: Epitaph
- Songwriter: Dexter Holland
- Producer: Thom Wilson

The Offspring singles chronology
"I'll Be Waiting" (1986)	"Come Out and Play" (1994)	"Self Esteem" (1994)

Music video
- "Come Out and Play" on YouTube

"Come Out and Play" (sometimes subtitled "Keep 'Em Separated") is a song by the American punk rock band the Offspring. It is the seventh track on their third album, Smash (1994), and was released in August 1994 by Epitaph Records as its first single. Written by frontman Dexter Holland, it is considered the Offspring's breakthrough song, as it received widespread radio play, with first attention brought by Jed the Fish of KROQ-FM. The song reached number one on the US Billboard Modern Rock Tracks chart, bringing both the band and the punk rock genre to widespread attention. Its accompanying music video was directed by Darren Lavett.

The song also appears as the second track on their Greatest Hits album (2005).

== Music and lyrics ==
Stylistically, the track combines "heavy riff-based punk" with surf-style guitar work.

Dexter Holland said that most songs on Smash "were just about whatever was happening in front of me". In the case of "Come Out and Play", it was about gang and school violence: "Back then I was a grad student and I was commuting to school everyday in a shitty car, driving through East L.A. Gangland central. I was there the day of the L.A. riots. So I was very aware of that part of the world, and a lot of that gun stuff came out in songs like 'Come Out and Play'." The line "you gotta keep 'em separated" was sung by Jason "Blackball" McLean, a friend and a fan of the band. Inspiration for this line came from Dexter Holland's experience in a laboratory cooling Erlenmeyer flasks full of hot liquids.

== Critical reception ==
Jennifer Nine from Melody Maker named "Come Out and Play" Single of the Week, saying, "If only all sweaty hardcore boys jumping around in their big boots sounded this cool and this happy. A big fat groovy thing." Pan-European magazine Music & Media wrote, "This single was shipped to American college and rock radio a while ago as promo-only. Contrary to expectations, airplay soared and the album Smash has now reached platinum status in the US. It's a quirky, noise-y rock song that sports an interesting rhythm that could go down well with album rock programmers in Europe."

== Music video ==
"Come Out and Play" was the first Offspring song for which a music video was created. The music video, directed by American director Darren Lavett, was shot in May 1994 and debuted on MTV in the summer of that year. The video is almost entirely in black-and-white with sepia tone segments, and features the band performing the song in the garage of a house with tinfoil covering the walls. There is also footage involving dogs fighting over a chew toy with a crowd watching, a horse race, a sword fight and some clips of several snakes and snake charmers, as well as some fencing scenes.

== Legal issues ==
In 1994, Posh Boy Records owner Robbie Fields submitted a written claim to Epitaph Records via the Harry Fox Agency, alleging that the two-bar Arabian guitar phrase repeated throughout "Come Out and Play" copied the guitar solo from "Bloodstains", a song by the Fullerton, California punk rock band Agent Orange written in 1979 to which Fields, as the song's publisher, owned the copyright. Offspring lead vocalist and primary songwriter Dexter Holland had cited "Bloodstains" as one of the songs that sparked his interest in punk rock, saying it "really influenced me, especially that Arabian-sounding lead. I've written a lot of stuff like that", and the Offspring's public admiration had brought Agent Orange increased attention. Fields contended that the similarity between the two guitar parts amounted to the Offspring sampling Agent Orange, and requested that Epitaph pay a licensing fee of US$0.01 for each copy of Smash sold—equating to $60,000 or more at the time—which he would split evenly with Agent Orange frontman and "Bloodstains" writer Mike Palm. A lawsuit was not filed, as Fields said "Nobody wants to pillory anybody. But I feel I have a fiduciary duty to represent Mike Palm's interests." Palm declined to give an opinion on the matter, later noting that he was not involved in filing the claim but did not disagree with it, and invited listeners to compare the two songs, saying "Anyone who listens will know what the issue is."

The Offspring's manager Jim Guerinot called Fields' claim baseless, saying the two guitar parts were "not even close to identical. They're both in the same scale, [and] there's no doubt there's an influence, [but] it doesn't mean that it's stolen. If he feels he has something, he'll sue, and if we've done something that is proven wrong [by technical analysis of the two songs] we should be sued. But we don't feel there's any merit to it." Randall Wixen, the Offspring's music publisher, stated that a musicologist hired by Epitaph determined the two guitar parts were not identical, despite being based in the same Middle Eastern scale. "We've told [Fields] a hundred times he's not getting paid. He's not getting a cent", Wixen said in 1996, stating that Fields and Palm would have to sue if they wished to pursue the claim. Although no lawsuit was ever filed, Palm maintained that he still deserved credit for the guitar riff: "I could show you interviews in which Dexter Holland outright admits that he took that riff from my song and used it in his song," he asserted in 2000, "In the rap world, when something like that is taken as a sample, they pay for it the same way I pay for guitar strings and picks." The claim became national news when the Offspring discussed it on MTV, leading to a backlash against Palm: "Some punk kid's perception of that is to think that I'm the bad guy," he said, "but they don't understand that the Offspring are millionaires and I'm just trying to retain whatever little tiny thing is mine."

Some fellow Californian punk rock musicians criticized the allegation. Frank Agnew, guitarist of fellow Fullerton band the Adolescents, remarked "I don't see how you can call that plagiarism; all it is, is an Arabic scale. It just reeks to me [as if] people are after a piece of the pie. If the Offspring did a guitar solo that was reminiscent of one of my guitar solos, I'd be honored, not [antagonized]. I think it's real petty." The Vandals, who were signed to Holland's label Nitro Records, released the song "Aging Orange" on their 1996 album The Quickening, with lyrics by bassist Joe Escalante mocking Palm's claim to ownership of a style rooted in ancient Middle Eastern music.

Back in ancient Egypt many pharaohs went to jail
For misappropriation of my Phrygian scale
I said "Listen, Tutankhamun, you're driving me insane
It's obvious those bellies are all dancing to 'Bloodstains'
I figured out you owe me, and please try not to laugh
But every time I hear it, I get one more golden calf"

Palm called the song "nothing but Joe's desperate attempt to brown-nose the Offspring", characterizing it as "lame and out of line. You think there was some ass-licking going on there?", sentiments echoed by Fields. Palm noted "Aging Orange" incorrectly implied he had sued the Offspring. Escalante, also an entertainment lawyer, said that Fields' and Palm's attempt to get money from Epitaph and the Offspring represented "the kind of crap I hate" in both the legal system and entertainment business, and that the Vandals—with their long tradition of satirizing things they perceived foolish within the punk scene—would have ridiculed the situation regardless of the parties involved. The Offspring later covered "Bloodstains" for the soundtrack of the 2000 film Ready to Rumble. "It's great that they recorded 'Bloodstains'", said Palm, "but it doesn't help me personally. Sometimes I feel like an old black bluesman who got ripped off."

== Alternate versions ==
- The Offspring themselves made a middle-eastern styled instrumental version of the song. It can be heard as a hidden track at the end of Smash as well as on the "Come Out and Play" single.
- The UCLA Bruin Marching Band is known to play a marching band version of "Come Out and Play".
- This song was covered by Richard Cheese on his 2000 album, Lounge Against the Machine and again released on the 2006 album, The Sunny Side of the Moon.
- The song is also played on wind instruments in the movie Click.
- "Weird Al" Yankovic wrote a parody version entitled "Laundry Day" which was played live on his tours from 1996 through 2000, but was never officially recorded for any of his albums. There are conflicting stories as to why his parody was never recorded; either Yankovic never approached the Offspring about releasing the parody, or the band denied permission.
- Aside from Yankovic, five other parody versions of the song were recorded and released: "Put the Cheese Away (Keep It Refrigerated)" by Joe and the Chicken Heads (1995), "Come Out and Pray" by ApologetiX (1997), "Wrong Foot Amputated" by Bob Rivers, "Get Them Immigrated" by Manic Hispanic (2001) and "Keep Her Penetrated" by Blowfly (2006).
- A master track of this song is featured in the video games Rock Band 2 and Rock Band Unplugged.

== Alternate appearances ==
As well as appearing on Smash, the song also appears as the second track on their 2005 Greatest Hits album. The music video also appears on the Complete Music Video Collection DVD, which was also released in 2005. The song is heard in the carnival fight scene in Nobody 2.

== Track listings ==
No.	Title	Length
1.	"Come Out and Play" (Keep 'Em Separated)	3:17
2.	"Session"	2:33
3.	"Come Out and Play" (Acoustic Reprise)	1:31

== Personnel ==
=== The Offspring ===
- Dexter Holland – vocals, guitar
- Noodles – guitar, backing vocals
- Greg K. – bass
- Ron Welty – drums

=== Additional musicians ===
- Jason "Blackball" McLean – additional vocals

== Charts ==
=== Weekly charts ===
Chart (1994–1995)	Peak position
Australia (ARIA)	8
Australia Alternative (ARIA)	1
Canada Top Singles (RPM)	43
European Hot 100 Singles (Music & Media)	67
European Alternative Rock Radio (Music & Media)	23
France (SNEP)	14
Iceland (Íslenski Listinn Topp 40)	2
Netherlands (Dutch Top 40)	38
Netherlands (Single Top 100)	32
Sweden (Sverigetopplistan)	23
UK Singles (Official Charts)	98
US Radio Songs (Billboard)	38
US Alternative Airplay (Billboard)	1
US Mainstream Rock (Billboard)	10
US Pop Airplay (Billboard)	39

=== Year-end charts ===
Chart (1994)	Position
Australia (ARIA)	54
US Album Rock Tracks (Billboard)	33
US Modern Rock Tracks (Billboard)	2

Chart (1995)	Position
Australia (ARIA)	61
France (SNEP)	69
Iceland (Íslenski Listinn Topp 40)	58

== Certifications ==
Region	Certification	Certified units/sales
Australia (ARIA)	Platinum	70,000^{^}
New Zealand (RMNZ)	Platinum	30,000^{‡}
United Kingdom (BPI)	Gold	400,000^{‡}
United States (RIAA)	Platinum	1,000,000^{‡}
^{^} Shipments figures based on certification alone.^{‡} Sales+streaming figures based on certification alone.
