= Noodles (guitarist) =

American guitarist

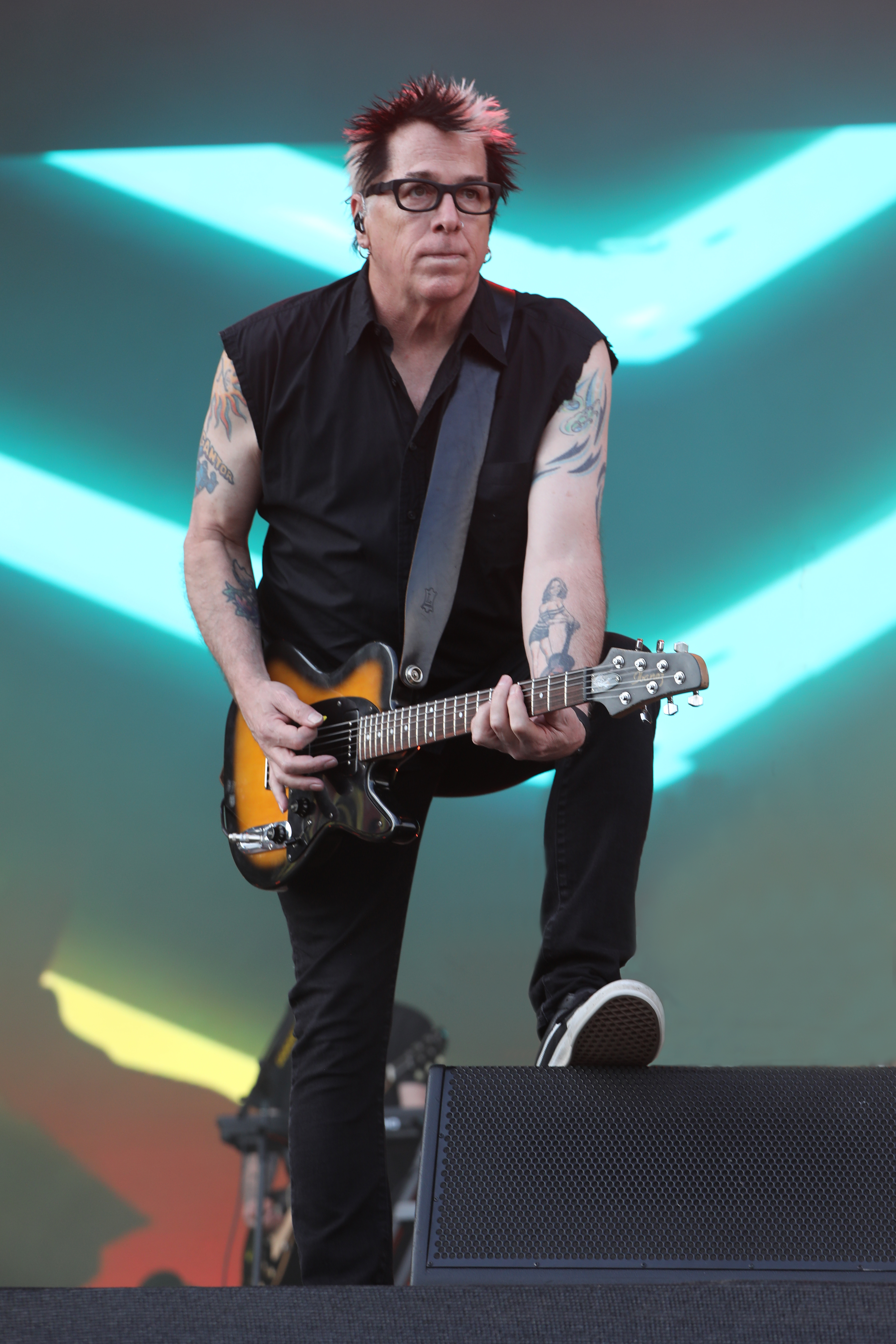
- Noodles performing in 2022

Background information
- Born: Kevin John Wasserman; February 4, 1963 (age 63); Los Angeles, California, U.S.
- Origin: Garden Grove, California, U.S.
- Genres: Punk rock; skate punk; pop-punk; alternative rock
- Occupation: Guitarist
- Years active: 1985–present
- Member of: The Offspring
- Website: offspring.com

Kevin John Wasserman (born February 4, 1963), better known as Noodles, is an American musician who serves as the lead guitarist and backing vocalist for the Offspring. He earned the nickname "Noodles" for his frequent noodling (improvising) on the guitar.

== Career ==
Before joining the Offspring, Noodles played in a local band called Clowns of Death along with some friends, including drummer James Lilja. Lilja got recruited by Dexter Holland to join his band Manic Subsidal, on an agreement that Lilja would play in Manic Subsidal, if Holland joined Lilja's band Clowns of Death. After Holland played with Clowns of Death, he asked Noodles to join their band. After drummer Ron Welty joined the band in 1987 to replace James Lilja, the band started recording their debut album in 1989. After recording a demo in 1988, the Offspring signed a deal with a small-time label, Nemesis Records, for whom they recorded their first full-length album, The Offspring, in March 1989. This album would eventually be re-issued in 1995, by bandmate Greg K. and Holland's own record label, Nitro Records.

In 1991, the Offspring signed with Epitaph Records (home of Bad Religion, L7, NOFX, Pennywise and other similar bands). Their first release on the label was Ignition, which was released in 1992. Their last album for that label was 1994's Smash, which still holds the world record for most sales of an album on an independent label. The band then signed with Columbia Records in 1996 (after Brett Gurewitz, owner of Epitaph and guitarist for Bad Religion, sold the contract to Columbia) for whom they released their next six albums, Ixnay on the Hombre (1997), Americana (1998), Conspiracy of One (2000), Splinter (2003), Rise and Fall, Rage and Grace (2008) and Days Go By (2012). The albums Let The Bad Times Roll (2021) and Supercharged (2024) were released on Concord Records. Noodles is one of the two members (along with Dexter Holland) to appear on all of The Offspring's albums.

During the band's early days, Noodles worked as a janitor at Earl Warren Elementary School in Garden Grove. Before Smash was released, he had been planning to quit the band, but the surprise success of "Come Out and Play" forced him to reconsider.

On their DVD release Huck It (2000), as part of a mock interview, Noodles claims to like the "finer things in life", such as red wine, classical music, cigarettes, poetry and pasta. He occasionally goes snowmobiling and snowboarding.

On October 21, 2026, it was announced that Wasserman would step away from performing with the band live for the immediate future, to deal with an undisclosed sudden and serious health issue.

== Equipment ==
=== Guitars ===
Noodles generally plays Ibanez guitars, and he has now had four signature models, each of which is a Talman. His first was the NDM1, which has a duct tape finish. Second was the NDM2, which has the Offspring's logo with glasses on the pickguard. His third signature guitar, the NDM3, had P90 pickups. His latest signature guitar is the NDM4. It also has P90 pickups and has a sunburst finish on it. He prefers DiMarzio Tone Zone pickups.

In the early days of the Offspring, he played a wider range of guitars, including Fender Telecasters, Ibanez Talmans and Gibson Les Pauls. He also owns other guitar models, such as Paul Reed Smith guitars, a Fender Stratocaster and other Fender models, Jackson guitars, and Gibson guitars. In an interview on the Offspring's Complete Music Video Collection, Noodles said that he gave his Stratocaster to one of the actors that appeared on the video for their 1994 single "Self Esteem".

=== Amplifiers ===
For early Offspring albums, Noodles used a Mesa/Boogie Mark IV. In 2013, he was turned on to VHT amplifiers by the band's guitar tech and has since used Mark IVs and VHTs in unison.

== Discography ==
=== The Offspring ===
- The Offspring (1989)
- Ignition (1992)
- Smash (1994)
- Ixnay on the Hombre (1997)
- Americana (1998)
- Conspiracy of One (2000)
- Splinter (2003)
- Rise and Fall, Rage and Grace (2008)
- Days Go By (2012)
- Let the Bad Times Roll (2021)
- Supercharged (2024)

=== Guest appearances ===
- Mötley Crüe – Cancelled (2024) (backing vocals)
