= Dave Jerden =

American record producer (1949–2025)

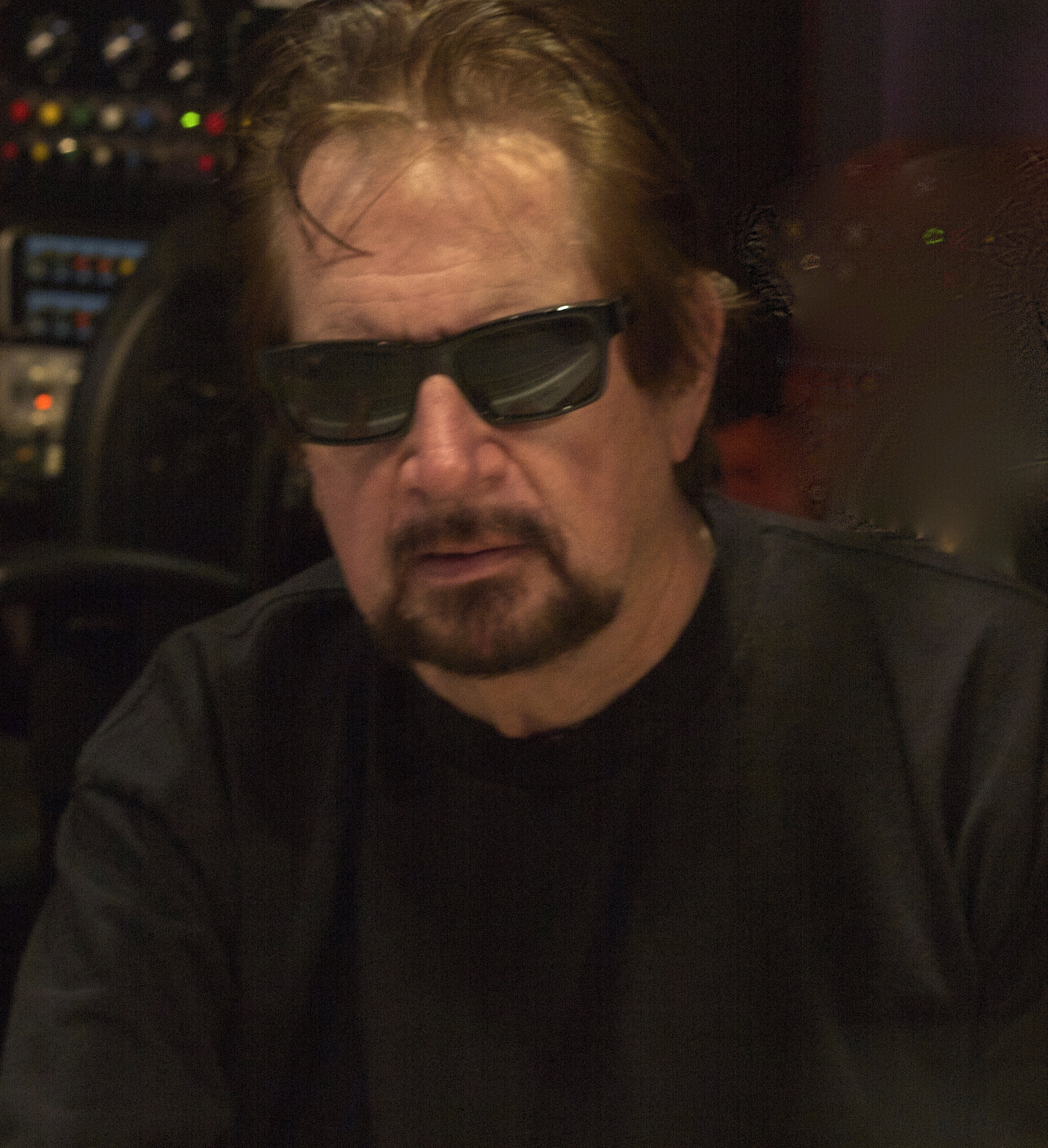
- Jerden in 2015

Background information
- Born: July 25, 1949
- Died: February 5, 2025 (aged 75)
- Genres: Rock; heavy metal; hard rock; punk rock; alternative rock; grunge
- Occupations: Record producer; recording engineer; audio mixing
- Years active: 1976–2025

David Jerden (July 25, 1949 – February 5, 2025) was an American record producer, audio engineer and mixer. He is best-known for producing, engineering and mixing albums recorded by a variety of bands from the mid-to-late 1980s and 1990s, including the Red Hot Chili Peppers, Jane's Addiction, Alice in Chains, Social Distortion, the Offspring, Anthrax, Fishbone, Meat Puppets and Spinal Tap. He had also engineered and mixed albums by the Rolling Stones, Talking Heads and Frank Zappa. However, Jerden had stated that he disliked the term "producer", preferring to refer to himself primarily as an engineer.

== Career in production ==
Jerden developed his engineering and mixing skills at Eldorado Recording Studios in Hollywood, California, beginning in the late 1970s. He engineered and mixed acclaimed and successful records by artists such as Talking Heads, David Byrne, Frank Zappa, Mick Jagger, the Rolling Stones and many others.

His career as a producer emerged in the late 1980s, beginning with albums by Jane's Addiction and Alice in Chains. Music Radar stated that these albums went against the prevailing sonic qualities of the day—dominated as it was by "hair metal bands"—and that Jerden had an important hand in shaping such genre-defining sounds. "Dave was a great guy," recalled Jane's frontman Perry Farrell, "but I wasn't always sure how he would receive my moves. I remember waiting for him to look the other way so I could push the sliders on the desk up higher."

As a producer and mixer, Jerden also worked with artists such as the Red Hot Chili Peppers Fishbone, Anthrax, the Offspring, Meat Puppets, Social Distortion, Biohazard and Sacred Reich.

In 1986, Jerden met with the Replacements about producing the album that would eventually become Pleased to Meet Me. Jerden's sobriety, however, was a disqualifying factor for the notoriously hard-partying Paul Westerberg and Tommy Stinson, who were both drunk for the meeting and expected any prospective producer to at least attempt to keep up with them, despite the band's then-recent firing of Stinson's brother Bob for his mounting drug and alcohol abuse. Jerden was also initially offered to produce Megadeth's 1990 album Rust in Peace, but, according to engineer Micajah Ryan, "after a few days, Dave Mustaine, the quote was, 'I think there's too many guys named Dave around here, we're gonna get rid of one of them.' And Dave Jerden got fired."

By the mid-1990s, Jerden felt overwhelmed by the trappings of his success and decided to "lay low": working on occasional projects, but primarily experimenting with recording equipment involved in the transition from digital to analogue domains.

Jerden was the co-owner of Tranzformer Studio in Burbank, California.

== Personal life and death ==
Jerden had two children: Michelle (Jerden) Forrest and Bryan Jerden.

Jerden died on February 5, 2025, at the age of 75.

== Selected discography ==
- 1980: Remain in Light - Talking Heads (engineer, mixing)
- 1981: My Life in the Bush of Ghosts - David Byrne/Brian Eno (engineer)
- 1981: The Red and the Black - Jerry Harrison (producer, engineer)
- 1983: The Man From Utopia - Frank Zappa (engineer)
- 1983: Future Shock - Herbie Hancock (engineer, mixing)
- 1984: The Red Hot Chili Peppers - The Red Hot Chili Peppers (engineer)
- 1984: Sidewalk - Icehouse (mixing)
- 1985: She's the Boss - Mick Jagger (engineer)
- 1986: Dirty Work - The Rolling Stones (engineer)
- 1987: Show Me - 54-40
- 1988: Nothing's Shocking - Jane's Addiction
- 1988: Life Sentence to Love - Legal Weapon (producer, engineer, mixing)
- 1989: Mother's Milk - Red Hot Chili Peppers (mixing)
- 1989: Jane Child - Jane Child (engineer)
- 1990: Social Distortion - Social Distortion
- 1990: Ritual de lo Habitual - Jane's Addiction
- 1990: Facelift - Alice in Chains
- 1991: Circa - Mary's Danish
- 1991: The Reality of My Surroundings - Fishbone
- 1991: Symbol of Salvation - Armored Saint
- 1991: Burning Time - Last Crack
- 1991: Swandive - Bullet LaVolta
- 1992: Break Like the Wind - Spinal Tap (mixing, producer)
- 1992: Somewhere Between Heaven and Hell - Social Distortion
- 1992: Dirt - Alice in Chains
- 1992: Rattlebone - Rattlebone
- 1992: That What Is Not - Public Image Ltd.
- 1993: Independent - Sacred Reich
- 1993: Sweet Water - Sweet Water
- 1993: Sound of White Noise - Anthrax
- 1993: Dig - Dig
- 1994: Love Spit Love - Love Spit Love
- 1995: Driver Not Included - Orange 9mm
- 1995: Hello - Poe
- 1995: Superfriends - Sweet Water
- 1996: Mata Leão - Biohazard
- 1996: Bar Chord Ritual - Rust
- 1997: Wacko Magneto - Ednaswap
- 1997: Hang-Ups - Goldfinger
- 1997: Ixnay on the Hombre - The Offspring
- 1998: Americana - The Offspring
- 1998: Darkest Days - Stabbing Westward
- 1998: Flight 16 - Flight 16
- 1999: Suicide - Sweet Water
- 1999: Rev - Perry Farrell (mixing, engineer, producer)
- 1999: F=0 - Dis.Inc.
- 2000: Deviant - Pitchshifter
- 2001: The Pleasure and the Greed - Big Wreck
- 2001: Cringe - Cringe
- 2002: A Passage in Time - Authority Zero
- 2003: Before Everything & After - MxPx
- 2004: Dropbox - Dropbox
- 2013: Entitled - Richie Ramone
- 2015: Rare Breed - The Shrine
