= List of awards and nominations received by the Offspring =

The Offspring awards and nominations
Awards and nominations
Award	Wins	Nominations
3D Awards	1	1
California Music Awards	2	2
Juno Awards	0	1
Kerrang! Awards	2	3
MTV Europe Music Awards	1	3
MTV Video Music Awards	0	2
Loudwire Music Awards	0	1
OC Music Awards	9	14
Billboard Music Awards	1	2

Totals (Note: Certain award groups do not simply award one winner. They acknowledge several different recipients, have runners-up, and have third place. Since this is a specific recognition and is different from losing an award, runner-up mentions are considered wins in this award tally. For simplification and to avoid errors, each award in this list has been presumed to have had a prior nomination.)
- Wins: 16
- Nominations: 29

The Offspring is an American punk rock band formed in 1984 and currently consisting of Dexter Holland (lead vocals, rhythm guitar), Noodles (lead guitar, backing vocals), Todd Morse (bass, backing vocals) and Brandon Pertzborn (drums).

The band has released twelve studio albums: The Offspring (1989), Ignition (1992), Smash (1994), Ixnay on the Hombre (1997), Americana (1998), Conspiracy of One (2000), Splinter (2003), Rise and Fall, Rage and Grace (2008), Days Go By (2012), Let the Bad Times Roll (2021), Supercharged (2024) and “((Running and Cycling with The Offspring)) (2025). The last two albums were released by Concord Records. Six albums were released by Columbia Records in the US, while the first three were released by Nemesis Records and Epitaph Records respectively. One of the most commercially successful punk rock bands, The Offspring has sold over 40 million albums worldwide.

== 3D Awards ==
The International 3D Awards is the largest and most respected set of awards for the 3D, computer graphics industry worldwide. The annual 3D Awards ceremony is held during the 3D Festival events in Copenhagen, Denmark. The Offspring has won one award.

Year	Nominee / work	Award	Result
2004	"Hit That"	Music Video Visual Effects	Won

== California Music Awards ==
The California Music Awards or CAMA is an annual awards ceremony held in California. The Offspring has won two awards.

Year	Nominee / work	Award	Result
2004	Splinter	Outstanding Alternative Album	Won
2009	Rise and Fall, Rage and Grace	Outstanding Alternative Album	Won

== Juno Awards ==
The Juno Awards are presented annually to Canadian musical artists and bands to acknowledge their artistic and technical achievements in all aspects of music. The Offspring has received one nomination.

Year	Nominee / work	Award	Result
2000	Americana	Best Selling Album (Foreign or Domestic)	Nominated

== Kerrang! Awards ==
The Kerrang! Awards is an annual awards ceremony held by Kerrang!, a British rock magazine. The Offspring has won two awards from three nominations.

Year	Nominee / work	Award	Result
1999	Pretty Fly (For a White Guy)	Best Video	Won
2002	The Offspring	Classic Songwriter	Won
2004	"Hit That"	Best Video	Nominated

== MTV Europe Music Awards ==
The MTV Europe Music Awards is an annual awards ceremony established in 1994 by MTV Europe. The Offspring has won one award from three nominations.

Year	Nominee / work	Award	Result
1999	The Offspring	Best Group	Nominated
1999	The Offspring	Best Rock Artist	Won
1999	Americana	Best Album	Nominated

== MTV Video Music Awards ==
The MTV Video Music Awards were established in 1984 by MTV to celebrate the top music videos of the year. The Offspring has received two nominations.

Year	Nominee / work	Award	Result
1999	"Pretty Fly (for a White Guy)"	Best Rock Video	Nominated
1999	"Pretty Fly (for a White Guy)"	International Viewer's Choice — MTV Russia	Nominated

== Loudwire Music Awards ==
Loudwire is an online magazine that covers hard rock and heavy metal music, Offspring has received 1 nomination

Year	Nominee / work	Award	Result
2014	"Dividing By Zero / Slim Pickens Does The Right Thing And Rides The Bomb To Hell"	Best Rock Video	Nominated

== OC Music Awards ==
The OC Music Awards is an annual awards ceremony established in 2000 and held in Orange County (California). The Offspring has won 9 awards from 14 nominations.

Year	Nominee / work	Award	Result
2001	Conspiracy of One	Best Album	Won
2001	"Original Prankster"	Best Song	Won
2001	The Offspring	Best Alternative	Nominated
2001	The Offspring	Best Punk	Won
2001	The Offspring	Best World	Won
2001	The Offspring	Best Live Band	Won
2004	Splinter	Best Album	Nominated
2004	"Hit That"	Best Song	Won
2004	The Offspring	Best Alternative	Nominated
2009	Rise and Fall, Rage and Grace	Best Album	Nominated
2009	"Hammerhead"	Best Song	Nominated
2013	The Offspring	Best Punk	Won
2014	The Offspring	Impact Award	Won
2014	The Offspring	Best Alternative	Won

== The Billboard Music Awards ==
The Billboard Music Award is an honor given by Billboard, a publication and music popularity chartcovering the music business. The Billboard Music Awards show had been held annually since 1989 in December until it went dormant in 2006. The awards returned in 2011 and is held annually in May.

Year	Nominee / work	Award	Result
1999	"The Offspring"	Modern Rock Artist of the Year	Won
1997	"Gone Away"	Modern Rock Tracks	Nominated
