= You're Gonna Go Far, Kid =

2008 single by The Offspring

Single by the Offspring

from the album Rise and Fall, Rage and Grace
- Released: September 4, 2008
- Recorded: November 2006–April 2008
- Studio: Maui, Hawaii and Orange County, California
- Genre: Punk rock; alternative rock
- Length: 2:58
- Label: Columbia
- Songwriter: Dexter Holland
- Producer: Bob Rock

The Offspring singles chronology
"Hammerhead" (2008)	"You're Gonna Go Far, Kid" (2008)	"Kristy, Are You Doing Okay?" (2008)

Music video
- "You're Gonna Go Far, Kid (Official Music Video) on YouTube

"You're Gonna Go Far, Kid" is a song by American punk rock band the Offspring. It is the third track from the band's eighth studio album, Rise and Fall, Rage and Grace (2008) and was released as its second single on September 4, 2008.

== Background ==
The song had previously impacted radio on August 12. It is the band's third number one single on the Hot Modern Rock Tracks chart, after "Come Out and Play" and "Hit That". The song stayed at No. 1 for 11 weeks and has sold 4 millions copies in the United States, making it the longest consecutive run for any Offspring single at number one. "You're Gonna Go Far, Kid" was certified quadruple platinum by the RIAA. The band has notched 16 top tens on the Alternative chart since then, including three number ones, the most recent being "You're Gonna Go Far, Kid".

== Track listing ==
Digital download
No.	Title	Length
1.	"You're Gonna Go Far, Kid" (radio edit)	2:58

CD maxi
No.	Title	Length
1.	"You're Gonna Go Far, Kid" (explicit album version)	3:00
2.	"You're Gonna Go Far, Kid" (live)	2:59
3.	"Hammerhead" (live)	4:36
4.	"You're Gonna Go Far, Kid" (video)	4:36

== Music video ==
The music video for this single was directed by Chris Hopewell, who has also directed videos for several other bands. On October 16, 2008, it was announced on the Offspring's official website that the video would debut Friday, October 17 at 3:00 pm Eastern/12 noon Pacific on Myspace.com.

As in the videos for "Hammerhead" and "Hit That", the video contains large amounts of CGI and does not include any footage of the band performing the song. However, unlike "Hammerhead" and "Hit That", the video also contains live actors recorded by camera mixed in with the CGI effects.

The plot follows a peasant working in a garden in a dystopian future. Suddenly, a nymph appears and gives the peasant a magical, golden acoustic guitar and he begins strumming to the song. He enters town and plays for the locals. The magical abilities of the guitar make the peasant a sensation, earning him much-needed money and causing various townsfolk to start dancing uncontrollably. The peasant then plays for plague-infested townspeople, and they are cured by the magic of the guitar. In return, he demands from one of them her expensive necklace while the nymph looks upon him disapprovingly. The peasant moves on to a very expensive hotel but is denied entry based on his appearance. He plays more to earn money for a nice suit. He buys the suit, enters the restaurant, and begins to play his guitar for the wealthy socialites, for more money. The nymph appears and punishes the peasant for his selfishness by first forcing him to dance alone to the music and then dragging him into the ground through a whirlpool. The guitar lands on the floor and dissolves into leaves at the end of the song.

== Personnel ==
=== The Offspring ===
- Dexter Holland – vocals, guitar
- Noodles – guitar
- Greg K. – bass

=== Additional musicians ===
- Josh Freese – drums

== Charts ==
=== Weekly charts ===
Weekly chart performance for "You're Gonna Go Far, Kid"
Chart (2008)	Peak position
Australia (ARIA)	54
Canada Hot 100 (Billboard)	25
Canada Rock (Billboard)	1
CIS Airplay (TopHit)	176
Germany (GfK)	67
New Zealand (Recorded Music NZ)	28
Spain (Promusicae)	19
US Billboard Hot 100	63
US Mainstream Rock (Billboard)	10
US Alternative Airplay (Billboard)	1

=== Year-end charts ===
2008 year-end chart performance for "You're Gonna Go Far, Kid"
Chart (2008)	Position
US Alternative Airplay (Billboard)	18

2009 year-end chart performance for "You're Gonna Go Far, Kid"
Chart (2009)	Position
US Hot Rock Songs (Billboard)	15

== Certifications ==
Certifications for "You're Gonna Go Far, Kid"
Region	Certification	Certified units/sales
Brazil (Pro-Música Brasil)	Gold	30,000^{‡}
Denmark (IFPI Danmark)	Platinum	90,000^{‡}
Germany (BVMI)	Gold	150,000^{‡}
Italy (FIMI)	Gold	25,000^{‡}
New Zealand (RMNZ)	2× Platinum	60,000^{‡}
Poland (ZPAV)	Gold	25,000^{‡}
Spain (Promusicae)	Gold	30,000^{‡}
United Kingdom (BPI)	Platinum	600,000^{‡}
United States (RIAA)	4× Platinum	4,000,000^{‡}
^{‡} Sales+streaming figures based on certification alone.
