= Da hui =

Da Hui may refer to:

- Dahui Zonggao, a 12th-century Zen master
- "Da Hui", a song by the Offspring from the 2003 album Splinter
