= (Can't Get My) Head Around You =

2004 song by The Offspring

Single by the Offspring

from the album Splinter
- B-side: "Gotta Get Away (Live)"
- Released: April 13, 2004
- Recorded: 2003
- Genre: Punk rock
- Length: 2:15
- Label: Columbia
- Songwriter: Dexter Holland
- Producer: Brendan O'Brien

The Offspring singles chronology
"Hit That" (2003)	"(Can't Get My) Head Around You" (2004)	"Spare Me the Details" (2004)

"(Can't Get My) Head Around You" is a punk rock song by the Offspring. The song features as the sixth track of the band's seventh studio album, Splinter (2003), and was released as its second single in 2004. "(Can't Get My) Head Around You" was released to radio on February 24, 2004. The song also appears as the 14th and final track on the band's Greatest Hits (2005).

== Music video ==
A music video was released in support of the single. The video clip features the band playing in a dome lit by fluorescent lights and was shot with over 125 cameras, in what the band's website calls 'the ultimate performance video'. The video was directed by Joseph Kahn, with Chris Watts supervising the visual effects and the multicamera system.

This is the first music video from the Offspring to show Atom Willard playing the drums.

The music video appears on the Complete Music Video Collection DVD, released in 2005.

== Track listing ==
Version 1
No.	Title	Length
1.	"(Can't Get My) Head Around You"	2:14
2.	"Gotta Get Away" (Live)	3:46
3.	"Come Out and Play" (Live)	3:10
4.	"The Kids Aren't Alright" (BBC Radio 1 Session)	4:16

Austria CD maxi
No.	Title	Length
1.	"(Can't Get My) Head Around You"	2:16
2.	"Come Out and Play" (Live)	3:12
3.	"Gotta Get Away" (Live)	3:44
4.	"Hit That" (Live)	2:50
5.	"(Can't Get My) Head Around You" (Video)	2:16

=== Limited edition 7" picture disc ===
No.	Title	Length
1.	"(Can't Get My) Head Around You"	2:14
2.	"Gotta Get Away" (Live)	3:44

=== Japan CD maxi ===
No.	Title	Length
1.	"(Can't Get My) Head Around You"	2:14
2.	"Hit That" (Live)	2:50
3.	"Come Out and Play" (Live)	3:12
4.	"Gotta Get Away" (Live)	3:44
5.	"The Kids Aren't Alright" (BBC Radio 1 Session)	4:16
6.	"(Can't Get My) Head Around You" (Video CD extra)	2:16

=== Promo CD ===
No.	Title	Length
1.	"(Can't Get My) Head Around You"	2:14

== Personnel ==
=== The Offspring ===
- Dexter Holland – vocals, guitar
- Noodles – guitar
- Greg K. – bass

=== Additional musicians ===
- Josh Freese – drums

== Charts ==
=== Weekly charts ===
Weekly chart performance for "(Can't Get My) Head Around You"
Chart (2004)	Peak position
Australia (ARIA)	53
Canada Rock Top 30 (Radio & Records)	15
Scotland Singles (OCC)	48
UK Singles (OCC)	48
UK Rock & Metal (OCC)	5
US Bubbling Under Hot 100 (Billboard)	20
US Mainstream Rock (Billboard)	16
US Alternative Airplay (Billboard)	6

=== Year-end charts ===
Year-end chart performance for "(Can't Get My) Head Around You"
Chart (2004)	Position
US Modern Rock Tracks (Billboard)	37
