= Let the Bad Times Roll (song) =

Single by the Offspring

from the album Let the Bad Times Roll
- Released: February 23, 2021
- Recorded: 2020
- Genre: Pop rock
- Length: 3:18
- Label: Concord
- Songwriter: Dexter Holland
- Producer: Bob Rock

The Offspring singles chronology
"Christmas (Baby Please Come Home)" (2020)	"Let the Bad Times Roll" (2021)	"We Never Have Sex Anymore" (2021)

Music video
- "Let the Bad Times Roll" on YouTube

"Let the Bad Times Roll" is a song by American punk rock band the Offspring. It is the title track from their tenth studio album of the same name and was released as the album's second single on February 23, 2021. The single topped the Billboard Mainstream Rock chart, making it the band's third song to do so following "Gone Away" (1997) and "Coming for You" (2015). It also reached the top 10 on Alternative Airplay and peaked at No. 29 on the Hot Rock Songs chart. On the album, the song is reprised as a modified version on the closing track "Lullaby".

== Background ==
Originally written in 2016, the song was recorded in 2020 for the band's tenth studio album of the same name. According to lead vocalist Dexter Holland, the song's lyrics recount the ongoing socio-political obstacles of the time when it was written. "I feel like we're in a unique period in history where instead of our world leaders saying 'we're doing our best," Holland said, "it's more like they're saying 'fuck it,' and it's really scary." In particular, the song enjoys some political humor about Donald Trump, with lyrics such as "gonna build a wall" with references to Hillary Clinton "That bitch won't get in my way" "Lock Her Up, Lock Her up"."Hey Lincoln, how does your grave roll?", referencing the common idiom of a deceased person rolling in his/her grave.

== Music video ==
The music video for "Let the Bad Times Roll" premiered on March 25, 2021, a month after the song was released as a single. It shows an exaggerated view of life during the COVID-19 quarantine, with the video's characters experiencing bizarre and frightening situations while stuck at home. As of September 2021, it has gained over 4.6 million views.

== Critical reception ==
In a positive review, Ash Anders of Spinnaker called the song's chorus "catchy and fun" and noted that the song had "a very distinct sound" compared to the rest of the album. Tim Hoffman of Riff Magazine praised the song, describing it as having "a pop-rock aesthetic with a more upbeat and bouncy melody to contrast the cynical lyrics".

== Charts ==
=== Weekly charts ===
Chart (2021)	peak position
Canada Rock (Billboard)	1
Czech Republic Rock (IFPI)	2
Finland Airplay (Radiosoittolista)	52
US Hot Rock & Alternative Songs (Billboard)	29
US Rock & Alternative Airplay (Billboard)	5

=== Year-end charts ===
Chart (2021)	Position
US Rock Airplay (Billboard)	16

== Personnel ==
Credits adapted from YouTube video.

=== The Offspring ===
- Dexter Holland – vocals, guitar, bass
- Noodles – guitar

=== Additional musicians ===
- Josh Freese – drums
- Jason "Blackball" McLean – additional vocals
- Ricardo "Tiki" Pasillas – additional percussion
