= Spare Me the Details =

Single by The Offspring

from the album Splinter
- Released: September 2004 (Aus and NZ)
- Genre: Pop-punk
- Length: 3:24
- Label: Columbia
- Songwriter: Dexter Holland
- Producer: Brendan O'Brien

The Offspring singles chronology
"(Can't Get My) Head Around You" (2004)	"Spare Me the Details" (2004)	"Can't Repeat" (2005)

"Spare Me the Details" is a song by American rock band the Offspring. The song is featured as the tenth track from their seventh studio album, Splinter (2003), and was released as a single in 2004 in Australia and New Zealand only. Dexter Holland wrote the song inspired by a friend who was unsettled at a vivid account of his girlfriend cheating on him, and asked the person telling him 'Please! Spare me the details!'

== Promo CD Track listing ==
No.	Title	Length
1.	"Spare Me the Details"	3:24

== Personnel ==
The Offspring

- Dexter Holland – lead and backing vocals, rhythm guitar
- Noodles – lead guitar, backing vocals
- Greg K. – bass, backing vocals

Additional musicians

- Josh Freese – drums
- Brendan O'Brien – piano

== Greatest Hits ==
The song was included as the fifteenth track on the Australian version of the band's Greatest Hits (2005).

== Charts ==
Chart (2004)	Peak position
New Zealand (Recorded Music NZ)	31
