= Chris Watts (visual effects artist) =

American inventor, businessman and filmmaker

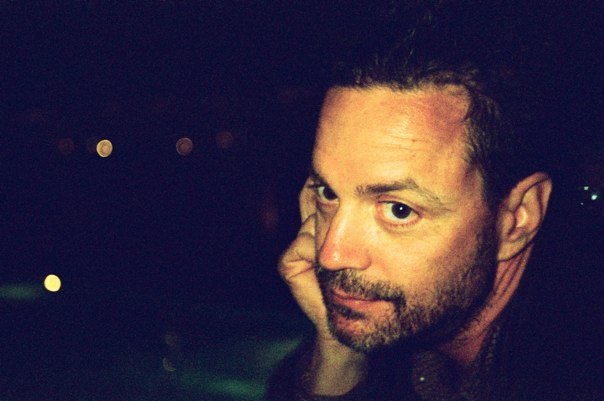
- Born: June 16, 1965 (age 60); Palm Springs, California, United States
- Occupations: President of bake visual effects inc., visual effects supervisor, filmmaker
- Years active: 1985–present
- Awards: Satellite Award for Best Visual Effects; VES Award for Outstanding Visual Effects in a Music Video
- Website: Bake VFX

Chris Watts (born June 16, 1965), is an American inventor, businessman, filmmaker, and visual effects supervisor.

== Biography ==
Currently president of Bake Visual Effects, Inc. located in Los Angeles, California, Watts began his film career with Dream Quest Images in 1989. Watts originated and implemented the digital intermediate process in 1995 when filming the New Line Cinema feature Pleasantville (1998).

Later in 2004, he pioneered the use of digital still cameras as a high resolution replacement for film cameras on Tim Burton's stop motion animated film Corpse Bride. Watts gained wide recognition with the 2007 box office hit 300, a Warner Bros. action film adapted from the graphic novel of the same name by writer-artist Frank Miller of Dark Horse Comics.

He later went on supervising the 2009 fantasy film Where the Wild Things Are.

== Filmography ==
Year	Film	Credit
1996	Matilda	Visual effects supervisor
1997	Gattaca	Visual effects supervisor
1998	Pleasantville	Visual effects supervisor
1999	The Insider	Visual effects supervisor
2000	Magicians	Visual effects supervisor
2002	Kung Pow! Enter the Fist	Visual effects supervisor
2002	American Icarus	Visual effects consultant
2003	Looney Tunes: Back in Action	Visual effects supervisor
2004	The Day After Tomorrow	Visual effects supervisor at Hydraulx
2004	Harry Potter and the Prisoner of Azkaban	Compositor
2004	The SpongeBob SquarePants Movie	Digital artist
2004	Fat Albert	Digital artist
2005	Corpse Bride	Visual effects consultant
2005	Venom	Visual effects supervisor at Hydraulx
2005	The Fog	Visual effects supervisor at Hydraulx
2006	300 (IMAX)	Visual effects supervisor
2007	Meet Bill	Visual effects supervisor, compositor
2008	Street Kings	Visual effects supervisor
2008	Disaster Movie	Visual effects supervisor
2009	Tales of the Black Freighter	Production designer
2009	Case 39	Visual effects supervisor
2009	Where the Wild Things Are (IMAX)	Visual effects supervisor
2010	Free Willy: Escape from Pirate's Cove	Visual effects consultant
2011	Detention	Visual effects supervisor, music licensing contract administrator
2013	Gravity	Visual effects consultant
2013	Horns	2nd unit visual effects supervisor
TBA	Akira	Visual effects supervisor
TBA	Paradise Lost	Visual effects consultant

=== Short films ===
- Five Shorts (2000) – co-writer and producer (directed by Billy Kent)
- In the Wall (2007) – Visual effects supervisor

=== Music videos ===
- Backstreet Boys – "Larger than Life" (directed by Joseph Kahn)
- Britney Spears – "Toxic" (directed by Joseph Kahn)
- Britney Spears – "Womanizer" (directed by Joseph Kahn)
- D12 – "Purple Hills" (directed by Joseph Kahn)
- DMX – "Who We Be" (directed by Joseph Kahn)
- DMX "X Gon' Give It to Ya" (directed by Joseph Kahn)
- Eminem – "We Made You" (directed by Joseph Kahn)
- Enrique Iglesias – "Hero" (directed by Joseph Kahn)
- Fiona Apple – "Across the Universe" (directed by Paul Thomas Anderson)
- Garbage – "Cherry Lips" (directed by Joseph Kahn)
- Katy Perry – "Waking Up in Vegas" (directed by Joseph Kahn)
- The Offspring – "Can't Get My Head Around You" (directed by Joseph Kahn)
- Papa Roach – "Between Angels and Insects" (directed by Joseph Kahn)
- The Pussycat Dolls – "I Hate This Part" (directed by Joseph Kahn)
- U2 – "Stuck in a Moment" (directed by Joseph Kahn)
- U2 "Elevation" (directed by Joseph Kahn)
- Wu Tang Clan – "Gravel Pit" (directed by Joseph Kahn)

=== Commercials ===
- 2004 – Coca-Cola x World of Warcraft x S.H.E
- 2005 – Sherwin-Williams Company
- 2008 – Clear
- 2008 – Sears
- 2009 – Deichmann Shoes
- 2009 – PokerStars (post-supervision; cameo)

== Awards and nominations ==
- 2001 – MTV Video Music Awards/(VMAs) – Best Visual Effects in U2's "Elevation" (nominated)
- 2004 – Visual Effects Society – Outstanding Visual Effects in a Music Video for Britney Spears' "Toxic" (won)
- 2007 – Satellite Award – Best Visual Effects for 300 (2006) (won)
- 2008 – Visual Effects Society – Best Single Visual Effect of the Year in 300 (2006) (nominated)
- 2008 – Saturn Award – Best Special Effects in 300 (2006) (nominated)

== Publications ==
- 2011 – Eurographics, Comprehensive Facial Performance Capture

== Press ==
- What to Expect at FMX by Studio Daily
