= Half-Truism =

Single by The Offspring

from the album Rise and Fall, Rage and Grace
- Released: May 12, 2009
- Recorded: November 2006–April 2008 in Maui, Hawaii and Orange County, California
- Genre: Punk metal
- Length: 3:27
- Label: Columbia
- Songwriter: Dexter Holland
- Producer: Bob Rock

The Offspring singles chronology
"Kristy, Are You Doing Okay?" (2008)	"Half-Truism" (2009)	"Days Go By" (2012)

"Half-Truism" is a song by the American punk rock band The Offspring. The song is featured as the opening track on the band's eighth studio album, Rise and Fall, Rage and Grace (2008), and was released as its fourth and final single on May 12, 2009. It impacted radio on the same day.

== Premiere ==
"Half-Truism" was first premiered before the release of the album at the Australian Soundwave Festival, which The Offspring headlined in 2008. It was the second song from the album to be played live (the first being "Hammerhead" which was played in 2007 at the Summersonic festival).

== Charts ==
Chart	Peak position
Canada Rock (Billboard)	34
US Alternative Airplay (Billboard)	21
US Mainstream Rock Airplay (Billboard)	30
US Hot Rock & Alternative Songs (Billboard)	31

== In popular culture ==
- "Half-Truism" is featured as a playable song in the video game Guitar Hero On Tour: Modern Hits.
- The song also appears in the commercial for the 2009 Virgin Tour.

== Personnel ==
=== The Offspring ===
- Dexter Holland – vocals, guitar
- Noodles – guitar
- Greg K. – bass

=== Additional musicians ===
- Josh Freese – drums
