= Kristy, Are You Doing Okay? =

Single by The Offspring

from the album Rise and Fall, Rage and Grace
- Released: November 25, 2008 (rock radio); February 10, 2009 (mainstream radio)
- Recorded: November 2006–April 2008 in Maui, Hawaii and Orange County, California
- Genre: Alternative rock
- Length: 3:42
- Label: Columbia
- Songwriter: Dexter Holland
- Producer: Bob Rock

The Offspring singles chronology
"You're Gonna Go Far, Kid" (2008)	"Kristy, Are You Doing Okay?" (2008)	"Half-Truism" (2009)

"Kristy, Are You Doing Okay?" is a song by American punk rock band The Offspring. The song features as the seventh track (fifth track on the LP) on the band's eighth studio album, Rise and Fall, Rage and Grace (2008), and was released as its third single. The song impacted radio on November 25, 2008.

== Content ==
The song was written about a girl that singer Dexter Holland knew as a child. She was sexually abused, and everybody in the neighborhood, including Dexter himself, knew about it but nobody took action. Holland wrote the song as an apology to the girl.

== Music video ==
A music video was made with director Lex Halaby. It premiered on February 2, 2009 on AOLmusic.com.

The video depicts a teenage girl (Natalie Dreyfuss) who writes continuously in her diary about being abused. A boy in the class (a younger Dexter, played by Trevor Morgan) notices her, and suspects that something is wrong. However, he does nothing, and she is left alone. At the end of the video, after exchanging glances, Kristy leaves her diary on the school grandstand for Dexter. The pages of the diary appear in the interspersed scenes of Dexter playing an acoustic guitar.

== Personnel ==
=== The Offspring ===
- Dexter Holland – vocals, guitar
- Noodles – guitar
- Greg K. – bass

=== Additional musicians ===
- Josh Freese – drums

== Charts ==
Chart (2008)	Peak position
Canada Rock (Billboard)	24
Mexico Airplay (Billboard)	48
US Adult Pop Airplay (Billboard)	21
US Bubbling Under Hot 100 (Billboard)	6
US Pop Airplay (Billboard)	31
US Mainstream Rock (Billboard)	38
US Alternative Airplay (Billboard)	7

== Release history ==
Release dates and formats for "Kristy, Are You Doing Okay?"
Region	Date	Format	Label(s)	Ref.
United States	February 10, 2009	Mainstream airplay	Columbia	
