= Rise and Fall, Rage and Grace =

Studio album by the Offspring
- Released: June 11, 2008
- Recorded: November 2006 – April 2008
- Studios: Plantation Mixing and Recording, Haiku; D-13 Studio, Huntington Beach; Henson Recording Studios, Los Angeles
- Genres: Punk rock; pop-punk
- Length: 43:40
- Label: Columbia
- Producer: Bob Rock

The Offspring chronology
Greatest Hits (2005)	Rise and Fall, Rage and Grace (2008)	Happy Hour! (2010)

The Offspring studio chronology
Splinter (2003)	Rise and Fall, Rage and Grace (2008)	Days Go By (2012)

Singles from Rise and Fall, Rage and Grace
- 1. "Hammerhead" Released: May 6, 2008; 2. "You're Gonna Go Far, Kid" Released: September 4, 2008; 3. "Kristy, Are You Doing Okay?" Released: February 10, 2009; 4. "Half-Truism" Released: May 12, 2009

Rise and Fall, Rage and Grace is the eighth studio album by American punk rock band the Offspring, released on June 11, 2008, by Columbia Records. It was the band's first album of new material in five years, following 2003's Splinter, marking their longest gap between studio albums at the time. The Offspring had been working on new material since the fall of 2004, but showed no further signs of progress until November 2006, when they announced on their official website that they had begun recording with producer Bob Rock. The writing and recording process, spanning four years and three recording studios, was finally finished in April 2008.

The album produced four singles: "Hammerhead", "You're Gonna Go Far, Kid", "Kristy, Are You Doing Okay?", and "Half-Truism".

== Writing and recording ==
Work for Rise and Fall, Rage and Grace dates back to September 2004, when frontman Dexter Holland said that he wanted to put out the next Offspring album in 2005 and that the new songs felt "pretty good". From June to August 2005, the band played the Vans Warped Tour for the first time, and followed that with a tour of Europe and Japan. To coincide with that tour, Sony Music released the first Offspring compilation album, Greatest Hits, which includes their hits from 1994 to 2005. After the Greatest Hits tour ended in the fall of 2005, the band took a break from writing, recording and touring. On February 7, 2006, Holland said in his journal that the band entered a demo studio to work on guitar tracks, and a week later, Holland said in his journal that he went out of town to "meet with a guy who might produce" the album. On June 13, 2006, Holland stated that the band (minus Willard) had been meeting every week and would begin recording shortly. On August 18, he posted another update on the band's journal, saying that they had demoed five songs and were looking to go into the studio soon. He described the new songs as "lots of guitar, energy, lots of energy, and good songs." In September 2006, it was announced that the album would be produced by Bob Rock, who was working with Holland and "helping him sort out songs."

On November 16, 2006, the Offspring announced on their website that they had begun recording the album with Rock, with an intended release date of spring 2007. Recording took place in Hawaii and California with Rock. By May 2007 the music for thirteen songs had been recorded, with a further 10 tracks demoed. At this time Holland announced that all of the songs were completely new with no re-recordings of older songs, jokingly remarking "that would be cheating, wouldn't it?" (in response to rumors that the unreleased song "Pass Me By" and the re-recording of their 1992-song "Dirty Magic" would appear on the album) and commenting that the new tracks "sound like a friggin' freight train." In July 2007, Holland also confirmed that the band had finished "two more songs" and the album was being recorded in Orange County, California. On the Christmas journal entry, he claimed that he had two more lyrics to write, "a couple more" to sing and "various tweaks" to do before mixing could begin. The band was at that time taking a break to spend Christmas with their families.

In January 2008, the band comically responded to upset fans who wanted news by having a "breaking news" story regarding the band buying plane tickets for their next show. In his journal, Holland explained that when there were no updates, it's usually because there's nothing to talk about- hence the faux "news." The next month, Holland said that the Offspring were "just in the studio getting some tracks down for the new record" and claims "it's a lot louder than the last couple". He also said the band wasn't "going to be making another Smash, or another Ixnay" but thought they were still "relevant to punk when they were created, and this one will be no different".

Holland announced on April 9, 2008, that the new album was finally finished and announced the name and release date, and that "Hammerhead" would be the first single. The album's title is derived from two tracks: "Rise and Fall" is the last track on the album and the song "Fix You" features the line "Rage and Grace".

== Promotion and release ==
In June 2008, shortly before the album's release, the influential L.A. station KROQ began playing "You're Gonna Go Far, Kid", making it seem possible that this could be the second single, though the station has played non-singles from the band in the past. Six other stations in the Southwestern United States followed suit. During the Offspring's three May 2008 concerts in California, "You're Gonna Go Far, Kid" was the only new song besides "Hammerhead" that was played, also causing fans to believe this would be the second single. "You're Gonna Go Far, Kid" was digitally released in Australia in July 2008 as a single and also appeared on the album cover as a sticker promoting the album as "includes the songs "Hammerhead and You're Gonna Go Far, Kid". In November 2008, KROQ briefly played "Stuff Is Messed Up", another song off the album, until the plug was pulled after "Kristy, Are You Doing Okay?" was confirmed as the third single.

On June 2, 2008, 30 second clips of each song on the new album were accidentally released by Amazon.com. They were removed swiftly but not before fans had ripped the clips and uploaded them to several fileshare and video sharing sites.

The official premiere of the album took place on the band's imeem site on June 9 at 3pm UTC.

== Promotional tour ==
In 2007, the Offspring first premiered "Hammerhead" at the Summersonic Festival, before any details of the new album had been revealed. The song would later be played again on the first night of the Australian Soundwave Festival, before being replaced on the set-list by "Half-Truism". "Hammerhead" was then played again on the last night of Soundwave Festival. In May 2008, during their performances on San Diego X-Fest, KROQ Weenie Roast, and the KJEE Summer Roundup, they also premiered "You're Gonna Go Far, Kid" alongside "Hammerhead", and have since played both songs in their sets at the Electric Festival in Spain, Rock in Rio 2008 in Portugal and Rock am Ring and Rock im Park in Germany. The band also played a series of Japanese dates from October 6–21, 2008. After headlining the nineteenth annual KROQ Almost Acoustic Christmas on December 13, 2008, they went on hiatus for a few months. In March 2009, the Offspring announced on their official website that they would be touring North America from May through July with Dropkick Murphys, Alkaline Trio, Street Dogs, Pennywise, Shiny Toy Guns and Sum 41. The Offspring also joined 311 on their summer 2010 Unity Tour. The 19-date tour was held in amphitheaters around the U.S., also featuring Pepper as a special guest. After this, the Offspring played Japan's Summer Sonic Festival that August. Before the 311 and Pepper tour, the Offspring played four East Coast Dates in June, which was supported by Terrible Things.

== Reception ==
Professional ratings
Aggregate scores
Source	Rating
Metacritic	52/100
Review scores
Source	Rating
AllMusic	2/5 stars
Billboard	3/5 stars
Consequence of Sound	2.5/5 stars
IGN	7.5/10
Kerrang!	4/5 stars
Los Angeles Times	3/4 stars
Now	3/5 stars
Rolling Stone	2.5/5 stars
Sputnikmusic	1.5/5
Uncut	2/5 stars

Rise and Fall, Rage and Grace received mixed reviews from critics. While AllMusic's Stephen Thomas Erlewine criticized the band for not changing their sound or moving forward, Kerrang! positively stated that the album is "an exquisite reminder of what a fabulous band they are".

=== Commercial performance ===
Rise and Fall, Rage and Grace debuted at number 10 on the Billboard 200 with 45,700 units sold, significantly higher than Splinter's peak position at 30, but with sales considerably lower than the debuts of its predecessors Splinter (87,000) and Conspiracy of One (125,000). As of June 2023, the album has sold more than 500,000 units in United States of America and was certified Gold status by RIAA.

== Track listing ==
All tracks are written by Dexter Holland, except where noted

No.	Title	Length
1.	"Half-Truism"	3:25
2.	"Trust in You"	3:09
3.	"You're Gonna Go Far, Kid"	2:57
4.	"Hammerhead"	4:38
5.	"A Lot Like Me" (track 7 on LP version)	4:28
6.	"Takes Me Nowhere"	2:59
7.	"Kristy, Are You Doing Okay?" (track 5 on LP version)	3:42
8.	"Nothingtown"	3:29
9.	"Stuff Is Messed Up"	3:32
10.	"Fix You"	4:18
11.	"Let's Hear It for Rock Bottom"	4:04
12.	"Rise and Fall"	2:59
Total length:		43:40

Japanese bonus track
No.	Title	Writer(s)	Length
13.	"O.C. Life" (D.I. cover)	Rikk Agnew	2:53
Total length:			46:35

Deluxe Edition
No.	Title	Length
13.	"You Gonna Go Far, Kid" (live at Hellfest 2022)	3:13
14.	"Hammerhead" (live at Hellfest 2022)	5:37
Total length:		52:30

== Personnel ==
The Offspring

- Dexter Holland – vocals, guitar, keyboards (uncredited for keyboards)
- Noodles – guitar, backing vocals
- Greg K. – bass, backing vocals

Additional musicians

- Josh Freese – drums
- Chris "X-13" Higgins – backing vocals

Production

- Bob Rock – producer, engineer
- Steve Masi – guitar technician
- Eric Helmkamp – engineer
- George Marino – mastering

Artwork

- Jason Goad – illustrations

== Charts ==
=== Weekly charts ===
Weekly chart performance for Rise and Fall, Rage and Grace
Chart (2008)	Peak position
Australian Albums (ARIA)	3
Austrian Albums (Ö3 Austria)	7
Belgian Albums (Ultratop Flanders)	36
Belgian Albums (Ultratop Wallonia)	32
Canadian Albums (Billboard)	4
Czech Albums (ČNS IFPI)	31
Dutch Albums (Album Top 100)	73
Finnish Albums (Suomen virallinen lista)	12
French Albums (SNEP)	6
German Albums (Offizielle Top 100)	13
Irish Albums (IRMA)	55
Italian Albums (FIMI)	27
Japan Hot Albums (Billboard Japan)	2
Japanese Albums (Oricon)	3
New Zealand Albums (RMNZ)	9
Polish Albums (ZPAV)	21
Portuguese Albums (AFP)	24
Scottish Albums (Official Charts)	47
Spanish Albums (Promusicae)	43
Swedish Albums (Sverigetopplistan)	52
Swiss Albums (Schweizer Hitparade)	5
UK Albums (Official Charts)	39
US Billboard 200	10
US Top Alternative Albums (Billboard)	4
US Top Rock Albums (Billboard)	4

=== Year-end charts ===
2008 year-end chart performance for Rise and Fall, Rage and Grace
Chart (2008)	Position
Australian Albums (ARIA)	80
French Albums (SNEP)	170
Japan Hot Albums (Billboard Japan)	54
Japanese Albums (Oricon)	60
Swiss Albums (Schweizer Hitparade)	21

== Certifications and sales ==
Region	Certification	Certified units/sales
Australia (ARIA)	Gold	35,000^{^}
Canada (Music Canada)	Platinum	80,000^{^}
Japan (RIAJ)	Gold	172,100
New Zealand (RMNZ)	Platinum	15,000^{‡}
Russia (NFPF)	Gold	10,000^{*}
United States (RIAA)	Gold	500,000^{‡}
^{*} Sales figures based on certification alone.^{^} Shipments figures based on certification alone.^{‡} Sales+streaming figures based on certification alone.

== Release history ==
Release dates from The Offspring's official website.

Date	Countries
June 11, 2008	Japan
June 13, 2008	Austria
June 13, 2008	Germany
June 13, 2008	Greece
June 13, 2008	Ireland
June 13, 2008	Italy
June 13, 2008	Netherlands
June 13, 2008	Switzerland
June 14, 2008	Australia
June 16, 2008	Belgium
June 16, 2008	Czech Republic
June 16, 2008	Denmark
June 16, 2008	France
June 16, 2008	Norway
June 16, 2008	Poland
June 16, 2008	Portugal
June 16, 2008	South Africa
June 16, 2008	Slovakia
June 16, 2008	United Kingdom
June 17, 2008	Asia
June 17, 2008	Canada
June 17, 2008	Latin America
June 17, 2008	Spain
June 17, 2008	United States
June 18, 2008	Finland
June 18, 2008	Sweden
