= Smash: 20th Anniversary Tour =

2014 concert tour by the Offspring

- World tour by The Offspring
- Poster to the first concert of the tour in Belgium
- Location: Europe; North America
- Start date: May 3, 2014
- End date: September 13, 2014
- Legs: 2
- No. of shows: 44

The Offspring concert chronology
- Days Go By Tour (2012–14); Smash: 20th Anniversary Tour (2014); Coming for You Tour (2015)

The Smash: 20th Anniversary Tour (also known as the Smash Anniversary Tour) was a concert tour by American rock band The Offspring, which celebrated the 20th anniversary of the band's third album Smash. The trek began on May 3, 2014 in Belgium, and wrapped up on September 13, 2014 in Sacramento.

== Background ==
The possibility of a Smash anniversary tour was mentioned in August 2012 by frontman Dexter Holland. In regards to the possibility, guitarist Noodles stated, "When it's 20 years of Smash, it's also 25 years of our first record. So, I don't know, we're going to have to do both of those back to back. I don't know, we'll see. That's only two years from now."

The Smash anniversary tour was announced on The Offspring's official website on April 8, 2014, the 20th anniversary of the album's original release date. On each date, the band played the Smash album in its entirety. To coincide with the anniversary, The Offspring released a special edition of Smash in mid-August on Epitaph Records, and toured to promote it. On May 12, 2014, it was announced that The Offspring would embark on the Summer Nationals 2014 tour from July to September, supported by their former labelmates Bad Religion and Pennywise as well as The Vandals, Stiff Little Fingers and Naked Raygun. To coincide with the Summer Nationals tour, The Offspring released cover versions of Pennywise's "No Reason Why", and Bad Religion's "Do What You Want" and "No Control" on their YouTube account.

== Tour dates ==
Date	City	Country	Venue
Europe
May 3, 2014	Meerhout	Belgium	Groezrock
June 6, 2014	Bulligny	France	Festival "Jardin du Michel"
June 8, 2014	Szántód	Hungary	Pannónia Fesztivál
June 9, 2014	Nuremberg	Germany	Rock im Park
June 12, 2014	Neuchâtel	Switzerland	Festi'neuch
June 13, 2014	Donington Park	United Kingdom	Download Festival
June 15, 2014	Nickelsdorf	Austria	Nova Rock Festival
June 20, 2014	Madrid	Spain	Neox Rocks Festival
June 21, 2014	Montendre	France	Free Music Festival
June 27, 2014	Tallinn	Estonia	Tallinn Song Festival Grounds
June 28, 2014	Norrköping	Sweden	Bråvalla Festival
July 1, 2014	Tromøya, Arendal	Norway	Hove Festival
July 2, 2014	Nibe	Denmark	Nibe Festival
July 4, 2014	Turku	Finland	Ruisrock
July 6, 2014	Sofia	Bulgaria	Sofia Rocks
North America
July 11, 2014	Costa Mesa	United States	OC Fair
July 29, 2014	Pittsburgh	United States	Stage AE
July 30, 2014	Baltimore	United States	Pier Six Pavilion
August 1, 2014	Asbury Park	United States	The Stone Pony Summer Stage
August 2, 2014	Philadelphia	United States	Electric Factory
August 4, 2014	New York City	United States	Terminal 5
August 5, 2014	New York City	United States	Terminal 5
August 7, 2014	Toronto	Canada	TD Echo Beach
August 8, 2014	Burlington	United States	Burlington Waterfront Park - Lake Champlain Maritime Festival
August 9, 2014	Montreal	Canada	Heavy MONTRÉAL
August 11, 2014	Boston	United States	House of Blues
August 14, 2014	Tampa	United States	MidFlorida Credit Union Amphitheatre
August 15, 2014	West Palm Beach	United States	Cruzan Amphitheatre
August 16, 2014	Cape Canaveral	United States	Exploration Tower at Port Canaveral
August 19, 2014	St. Augustine	United States	St. Augustine Amphitheatre
August 20, 2014	Atlanta	United States	The Masquerade
August 22, 2014	Oklahoma City	United States	Downtown Airpark
August 23, 2014	Albuquerque	United States	Isleta Amphitheatre - EdgeFest 2014
August 24, 2014	Englewood	United States	Fiddler's Green Amphitheatre
August 26, 2014	Magna	United States	The Great Saltair
August 27, 2014	Las Vegas	United States	The Joint
August 29, 2014	Mesa	United States	Mesa Amphitheatre
August 30, 2014	Chula Vista	United States	Sleep Train Amphitheatre
August 31, 2014	Mountain View	United States	Shoreline Amphitheatre
September 6, 2014	Sterling Heights	United States	Chill on the Hill
September 7, 2014	Cincinnati	United States	Horseshoe Casino Cincinnati
September 9, 2014	Milwaukee	United States	Eagles Ballroom
September 11, 2014	Council Bluffs	United States	Harrah's Ballroom
September 12, 2014	Chicago	United States	Riot Fest
September 13, 2014	Sacramento	United States	Aftershock Festival
