= Let the Bad Times Roll =

Studio album by the Offspring
- Released: April 16, 2021
- Recorded: January 2013 – June 2020
- Studios: D-13 (Huntington Beach); Plantation (Haiku); Henson Recording (Hollywood); Paramount (Los Angeles); The Warehouse (Vancouver)
- Genres: Punk rock; pop punk
- Length: 33:21
- Label: Concord
- Producer: Bob Rock

The Offspring chronology
Summer Nationals (2014)	Let the Bad Times Roll (2021)	Puck Punks: The Offspring Powerplay Hits (2024)

The Offspring studio chronology
Days Go By (2012)	Let the Bad Times Roll (2021)	Supercharged (2024)

Singles from Let the Bad Times Roll
- 1. "Coming for You" Released: January 30, 2015; 2. "Let the Bad Times Roll" Released: February 23, 2021; 3. "We Never Have Sex Anymore" Released: April 2, 2021; 4. "Gone Away" Released: November 12, 2021; 5. "Behind Your Walls" Released: April 9, 2022

Let the Bad Times Roll is the tenth studio album by American rock band the Offspring, released on April 16, 2021. Produced by Bob Rock, it is the band's first release on Concord Records, and their first studio album in nine years since Days Go By (2012), marking the longest gap between two Offspring studio albums. Let the Bad Times Roll also marks the band's first album without bassist and co-founding member Greg K., who was fired from the Offspring in 2018. Even though new bassist Todd Morse had already joined the band and appeared in the video for the album’s title track and "This Is Not Utopia", bass guitar accompaniment was provided by guitarist and vocalist Dexter Holland. It is the second and last album to feature drummer Pete Parada, who parted ways with the band in July 2021 for refusing to get a COVID-19 vaccination, due to suffering from Guillain–Barré syndrome.

The band's tour schedules, lineup changes, legal issues and the search for a new label after their split with Columbia Records, who released the Offspring's previous six albums, contributed to a years-long delay behind Let the Bad Times Roll. The band started recording new material for the album with Rock as early as the summer of 2013, and after re-recording it at various studios and at various periods between 2013 and 2020, it had been completed by 2020 and was ready for release later that year. However, due to the aforementioned issues, other inner disputes and the COVID-19 pandemic, the album's release was pushed back to 2021.

== Background, production and delays ==
Plans for a tenth studio album were first mentioned about six months after the release of Days Go By by Offspring guitarist Noodles, who stated that they would "sit down and take a look at a new record" after the completion of the Days Go By tour. Noodles had then hoped that the band would enter the studio in 2014 to begin recording their album. Vocalist Dexter Holland stated in a May 2013 interview that he had written a "punk" song about "the government keeping you down."

The Offspring entered the studio in August 2013 to begin tracking new material, with producer Bob Rock at the helm. Within the next few years, the album's progress was slowed down by grueling tour schedules and the end of their contract with Columbia Records, the label that the Offspring had been on since 1996. The band released their first song in over two years, "Coming for You", on January 30, 2015; at the time of its release, it was unclear if "Coming for You" would be released as a one-off single or would appear on the band's upcoming tenth studio album, but a tweet from frontman Dexter Holland heavily implied it was in an unfinished state. Noodles had stated, however, that "Coming for You" would appear on the album.

By September 2015, the Offspring were still in the studio and had finished 2-3 tracks. A month later, Noodles posted a picture of himself, Holland, Parada and Bob Rock in the studio on his Instagram page, which indicated that they were recording their tenth studio album. In a November 2015 interview Noodles said that he hoped the album would be released in 2016. However, in an August 2016 interview with EMP LIVE TV, Noodles said they had five or six songs done and they would release one or two songs soon. In the same interview, Noodles hoped the album would be finished by the end of 2016. In an October 2016 interview with Alaska Dispatch News, Noodles stated that the band was "planning on getting in the studio soon" to record the album, planned for release in 2017. On January 3, 2017, Noodles posted a picture of the band (except Greg K.) in studio on his Twitter page, "Here's a selfless selfie that I just took. Working!", implying that the band had finished or was still recording the album. In a May 2017 interview, Holland stated, "I actually plan to spend a lot more time in the studio. We didn't put it on hold but we've been less active on the recording side for the last few years so I would like to put out another record. The band is number one for me and what I am most passionate about."

In an interview during their appearance at Rock in Rio in September 2017, Noodles and Holland talked about the new Offspring album, with the former commenting, "We've got a few songs already done. We wanna do a couple more, and we definitely want to get something out soon. Our fans have waited long enough, I think, so we wanna get something in their hands that they can listen to and hold, and put in their ears." Holland added that the album would "for sure" be released in 2018. In an October 2017 interview, however, Holland said, "I think I want to do like an EP. It's kind of what people are doing these days and it makes for less time in between stuff. It has been five years for us so we have a few songs together and I'm hoping to get something out by early next year." In the same month, bassist Greg K. mentioned a possible 2018 release date for the new Offspring album, and revealed that one of the reasons for the album's slow progress was because they have been working on songs here and there. He also stated that the band was in no hurry to finish the album. In December 2017, Noodles told Front Row Live, "We're working on it. We were in the studio all this week. We finished up for the holidays on Tuesday, Wednesday, and then we're gonna get back in the studio as soon as the new year [rolls around], in January." On February 23, 2018, the band announced via Instagram that they had finished tracking down drums for the album. The Offspring were asked two months later on Twitter if their new album would be released soon, and replied, "We're hoping by summer."

On February 23, 2019, Noodles confirmed on his Instagram account that the new Offspring album was finished, writing "The album is done. Working on getting it to the fans now. Stay tuned!" A month later, Dexter Holland confirmed that the album was "98% finished" and mentioned a tentative fall 2019 release. Noodles reiterated that the album was ready for release in 2020 and they were in the process of searching for a new record label to release it. On April 21, 2020 the band released a rock cover of Joe Exotic's country song "Here Kitty Kitty" popularized by the 2020 Netflix documentary Tiger King. It was recorded while the band was in quarantine during the COVID-19 pandemic. In a June 2020 interview with Download TV, Holland confirmed that the new album was "basically done" but added that its release was "on hold at the moment" because of the coronavirus pandemic.

On February 8, 2021, Dexter and Noodles posted a video confirming that the album was finished with an official release date and single announcement coming soon.

On February 23, 2021, the Offspring announced Let the Bad Times Roll as the title of their tenth studio album, as well as its artwork, release date and track listing. The album's artwork was designed by Daveed Benito. The album's title track was released as a single on the same day.

== Critical reception ==
Professional ratings
Aggregate scores
Source	Rating
Metacritic	56/100
Review scores
Source	Rating
AllMusic	3/5 stars
Clash	4/10
Classic Rock	3/5 stars
Consequence of Sound	B−
DIY	1.5/5 stars
Kerrang!	3/5 stars
Sputnikmusic	2/5

Let the Bad Times Roll received mixed to negative reviews from music critics. At Metacritic, which assigns a normalized rating out of 100 to reviews from mainstream publications, the album received an average score of 56 based on 7 reviews, indicating "mixed or average reviews". DIY Magazine gave the album 1 and a half stars, saying "Rarely have Dexter Holland’s lyrics been so cliche, or the band as a whole revert to tropes worn thin before the group dropped their 1994 magnum opus, ‘Smash’. The faux-protest chorus of opener ‘This Is Not Utopia’ dilutes any earnest hostility with its inane repetition of “the roots” as Dexter chants “The roots of America / the roots of hysteria”." In a more positive review, Consequence of Sound stated that "Let the Bad Times Roll offers hints of creative tangents that could revitalize the band next time around – if they’re willing to challenge themselves."

== Track listing ==
All tracks are written by Dexter Holland, except "In the Hall of the Mountain King" (by Edvard Grieg).

Let the Bad Times Roll track listing
No.	Title	Length
1.	"This Is Not Utopia"	2:38
2.	"Let the Bad Times Roll"	3:18
3.	"Behind Your Walls"	3:21
4.	"Army of One"	3:11
5.	"Breaking These Bones"	2:46
6.	"Coming for You"	3:49
7.	"We Never Have Sex Anymore"	3:30
8.	"In the Hall of the Mountain King" (instrumental)	1:00
9.	"The Opioid Diaries"	3:01
10.	"Hassan Chop"	2:20
11.	"Gone Away" (stripped-down piano ballad version of the group's 1997 single of the same name)	3:16
12.	"Lullaby" (contains a reprise of "Let the Bad Times Roll")	1:12
Total length:		33:21

Deluxe edition bonus tracks
No.	Title	Length
13.	"Guerre Sous Couvertures" (French version of "We Never Have Sex Anymore")	3:30
14.	"The Opioid Diaries" (live at Pinkpop 2018)	3:50
Total length:		40:48

== Personnel ==
The Offspring

- Dexter Holland – vocals, guitar, bass, piano on "We Never Have Sex Anymore" (uncredited for bass and piano)
- Noodles – guitar, backing vocals
- Pete Parada – drums (all except 2, 7, 11, 12)

Additional musicians

- Josh Freese – drums (2, 7)
- Jason "Blackball" McLean – additional vocals on "Let the Bad Times Roll" (uncredited)
- Ricardo "Tiki" Pasillas – additional percussion (2, 7)
- Phil Jordan – trumpet on "We Never Have Sex Anymore"
- Jason Powell – clarinet and saxophone on "We Never Have Sex Anymore"
- Eric Marbauch – trombone on "We Never Have Sex Anymore"
- Alan Chang – piano on "Gone Away"

Production

- Bob Rock – producer, mixing, engineer
- Brendan O'Brien – producer drumtracks on "We Never Have Sex Anymore" at Henson Studios, Los Angeles, CA
- Adam Greenholtz – mixing
- John Dibiase – engineer
- Eric Helmkamp – assistant engineer (2, 6, 7)
- Nick DiDia – assistant engineer on "We Never Have Sex Anymore" at Henson Studios, Los Angeles, CA
- Emily Lazar – mastering at The Lodge, NY
- Chris Allgood – mastering at The Lodge, NY
- Dave Pierce – sound design on "Gone Away"
- Daveed Benito – cover art

== Charts ==
=== Weekly charts ===
Chart performance for Let the Bad Times Roll
Chart (2021)	Peak position
Australian Albums (ARIA)	2
Austrian Albums (Ö3 Austria)	1
Belgian Albums (Ultratop Flanders)	15
Belgian Albums (Ultratop Wallonia)	4
Canadian Albums (Billboard)	16
Croatian International Albums (HDU)	26
Czech Albums (ČNS IFPI)	14
Danish Vinyl Albums (Hitlisten)	12
Dutch Albums (Album Top 100)	38
Finnish Albums (Suomen virallinen lista)	10
French Albums (SNEP)	7
German Albums (Offizielle Top 100)	5
Hungarian Albums (MAHASZ)	26
Italian Albums (FIMI)	29
Japanese Albums (Oricon)	5
Polish Albums (ZPAV)	23
Portuguese Albums (AFP)	11
Scottish Albums (Official Charts)	4
Spanish Albums (Promusicae)	13
Spanish Physical Vinyl Albums (PROMUSICAE)	8
Swedish Physical Albums (Sverigetopplistan)	15
Swiss Albums (Schweizer Hitparade)	4
Swiss Albums (Romandie)	2
UK Albums (Official Charts)	3
UK Rock & Metal Albums (Official Charts)	1
US Billboard 200	27
US Independent Albums (Billboard)	3
US Top Alternative Albums (Billboard)	1
US Top Rock Albums (Billboard)	2
US Top Album Sales (Billboard)	5
US Top Rock & Alternative Albums (Billboard)	2
US Vinyl Albums (Billboard)	6

=== Year-end charts ===
Year-end chart performance for Let the Bad Times Roll
Chart (2021)	Position
Swiss Albums (Schweizer Hitparade)	90
