= Hammerhead (The Offspring song) =

Single by the Offspring

from the album Rise and Fall, Rage and Grace
- Released: May 6, 2008
- Studio: Maui, Hawaii and Orange County, California
- Genre: Punk metal
- Length: 4:38 (album version); 4:13 (radio edit)
- Label: Columbia
- Songwriter: Dexter Holland
- Producer: Bob Rock

The Offspring singles chronology
"Next to You" (2005)	"Hammerhead" (2008)	"You're Gonna Go Far, Kid" (2008)

"Hammerhead" is a song by American punk rock band the Offspring. The song is featured as the fourth track on the band's eighth studio album, Rise and Fall, Rage and Grace (2008), and was released as its first single. The song was first played at the Summer Sonic Festival in 2007. It peaked at No. 2 on Billboard's Alternative Songs chart.

The song was originally set to go to radio on May 6. However, the world premiere of the song took place on May 2 at 6 PM PST on KROQ Los Angeles (their hometown station). On May 5, 2008, the Offspring's official website released a free download of the song MP3 format, in much the same style as "Original Prankster" (from 2000's Conspiracy of One). To download it, users were required to provide an email address to receive a link to a high-quality MP3 of the track, which came free of digital rights management.

== Song meaning ==
According to singer/guitarist Dexter Holland, the lyrics are from the perspective of a gunman in a school shooting. This is supported by the closing lyrics "and you can all hide behind your desks now/and you can cry teacher come help me". Lead guitarist Noodles elaborated on this, stating that the lyrics describe a gunman who believes that everything he does is for the greater good - "take a life that others may live". He is affected by a huge force (Hammerhead - "it hammers in my head") in his mind that makes him deluded.

== Music video ==
=== Video contest ===
The band created a competition for fans of the band to create their own video for the song with their own original material. A YouTube group had been set up for this purpose. The band picked their favorite video and the winner received $10,000. The contest was only available to U.S. residents.

=== Video ===
The music video was directed by Teqtonik and debuted on IGN's website on June 9, 2008. The video alternates between the perspectives of the deluded shooter (who believes that he is a soldier) and that of the real world, often blending the two together. For instance, two children are shown tossing a "bomb" between one another, presumably simply a ball, while birds take the image of stealth fighters, and the shooter is consistently accompanied by the warped image of a military commander, presumably a personification of his military delusion.

== Reception ==
Reaction to the song has been generally positive. Describing it as a 'good harbinger' to base the album on, Michael Roffman of Consequence of Sound also said that the song 'works lyrically', and that 'Holland hasn't sounded quite this sincere since the very best Americana had to offer'. Richard Cromelin of the Los Angeles Times also claimed that "Hammerhead" had the strongest lyrics of the album, and The Dreaded Press praised the song's 'hard-hitting drums' and Dexter's 'urgent howling' giving a 'surprisingly fresh' result. However, Chris Fallon of AbsolutePunk.net claimed that it was too long and Roffman later commented that 'uninspired riffs' resulted in a lack of enthusiasm from the song.

== Track listing ==
No.	Title	Length
1.	"Hammerhead"
2.	"Hammerhead" (Radio Edit)

== Chart performance ==
The song debuted at number five on the Billboard Modern Rock Tracks airplay chart, making it the first song to debut on the top five of the Modern Rock Tracks since "What I've Done" by Linkin Park, and the band's highest debuting Modern Rock single. It went on to peak at number two for six weeks on that chart. It also debuted at number eighteen on the Mainstream Rock Tracks, peaking at number eight on that chart.

== Charts ==
=== Weekly charts ===
Weekly chart performance for "Hammerhead"
Chart (2008)	Peak position
Australia (ARIA)	91
Canada Hot 100 (Billboard)	53
Canada Rock (Billboard)	3
CIS Airplay (TopHit)	166
US Bubbling Under Hot 100 (Billboard)	5
US Mainstream Rock (Billboard)	8
US Alternative Airplay (Billboard)	2

=== Year-end charts ===
Year-end chart performance for "Hammerhead"
Chart (2008)	Position
Canada Rock (Radio & Records)	14
US Alternative Airplay (Billboard)	13
US Mainstream Rock (Billboard)	37

== In popular culture ==
- The censored version of "Hammerhead" is featured in the soundtrack for the 2008 American football videogame Madden NFL 09.
- "Hammerhead" is featured as downloadable content for the Rock Band video game. It was released on June 17, 2008. It was the first Offspring song to be released for the game.

== See also ==
- List of anti-war songs
