= Hit That =

2003 single by the Offspring

Single by the Offspring

from the album Splinter
- B-side: "Da Hui"
- Released: November 19, 2003
- Genre: Pop-punk
- Length: 2:48
- Label: Columbia
- Songwriter: Dexter Holland
- Producer: Brendan O'Brien

The Offspring singles chronology
"Defy You" (2001)	"Hit That" (2003)	"(Can't Get My) Head Around You" (2004)

European version

Import cover

"Hit That" is a song by American rock band the Offspring, included as the fourth track on the band's seventh studio album, Splinter (2003), and was released as its first single. The song also appears as the 13th track on their Greatest Hits (2005). "Hit That" was released to US rock radio on November 3, 2003.

Upon its release, "Hit That" reached the top 20 on the Australian ARIA Singles Chart and on the UK Singles Chart, as well as No. 64 on the US Billboard Hot 100. The song also topped the Billboard Modern Rock Tracks chart; this was the first time an Offspring song would reach No. 1 on that chart since their breakthrough single "Come Out and Play" was released a decade earlier in 1994.

== Composition ==
The song's lyrics, as put by Dexter Holland, are "about the consequences of promiscuity or the idea that no matter what the consequences might be, people are going to be out there doing it with each other", discussing how it results in teenage pregnancy and dysfunctional families.

Holland detailed:

"It's about taking responsibility. A generation ago, people were talking about the disintegration of the family because everyone was getting divorced, and how it was taking such a terrible toll on society. Well, you look around nowadays, and it's disintegrated so much more. Joe Blow has got three different kids by three different girls and vice versa, and it's happening more and more. And ultimately the kids are the ones who suffer from that. But when you get down to it, people are gonna hook up, so there's nothing you can do about it."

== Music video ==
The music video for the song, directed by John Williams and David Lea, tried to reflect the irresponsible male of the lyrics not in a literal way, but by telling the story of a dog that turns out to be an amoral force of mayhem, and needed to be caught and neutered to stop its destructive nature.

The video combines live-action footage and computer-generated effects, with Williams and Lea playing the part of the dog's owner, a blue man lip-syncing the song's lyrics by wearing gloves and a mask, onto which digital eyes and mouth were superimposed, by creating what Williams described as "a character you can't peg as either completely real or completely computer-generated". To create the same effect on the dog, there was an attempt at making a Great Dane wear a mask, but the dog did not like it, so instead an illuminated muzzle was worn that gave reference for the eventually superimposed animated head.

A first draft had caricatures of The Offspring's members through the video, but the band denied that, wanting to avoid something resembling a typical performance video.

The video appears on the Complete Music Video Collection DVD, released in 2005.

== Track listing ==
European CD maxi
No.	Title	Length
1.	"Hit That"	2:48
2.	"Da Hui"	1:32
3.	"Hit That" (USC Marching Band)

UK CD maxi
No.	Title	Length
1.	"Hit That"	2:48
2.	"The Kids Aren't Alright" (BBC Radio 1 Session)	4:16
3.	"Long Way Home" (Live)	2:34
4.	"Hit That" (USC Marching Band)	1:51
5.	"Hit That" (Video CD Extra)

Limited edition 7-inch picture disc
No.	Title	Length
1.	"Hit That"	2:48
2.	"(Can't Get My) Head Around You" (Live)

Germany limited edition 3-inch CD
No.	Title	Length
1.	"Hit That"	2:48
2.	"Hit That" (USC Marching Band)	1:51

== Personnel ==
=== The Offspring ===
- Dexter Holland – vocals, guitar
- Noodles – guitar
- Greg K. – bass

=== Additional musicians ===
- Josh Freese – drums
- Ronnie King – keyboards

== Charts ==
=== Weekly charts ===
Weekly chart performance for "Hit That"
Chart (2004)	Peak position
Australia (ARIA)	13
Austria (Ö3 Austria Top 40)	21
Belgium (Ultratip Bubbling Under Wallonia)	16
CIS Airplay (TopHit)	66
Croatia (HRT)	10
Czech Republic (IFPI)	9
European Singles Sales (Billboard)	17
Finland (Suomen virallinen lista)	13
France (SNEP)	32
Germany (GfK)	31
Ireland (IRMA)	33
Italy (FIMI)	19
Netherlands (Dutch Top 40 Tipparade)	2
Netherlands (Single Top 100)	60
New Zealand (Recorded Music NZ)	24
Paraguay (Notimex)	4
Scotland Singles (OCC)	8
Switzerland (Schweizer Hitparade)	57
UK Singles (OCC)	11
UK Rock & Metal (OCC)	1
US Billboard Hot 100	64
US Alternative Airplay (Billboard)	1
US Mainstream Rock (Billboard)	6

=== Year-end charts ===
Year-end chart performance for "Hit That"
Chart (2004)	Position
US Mainstream Rock Tracks (Billboard)	24
US Modern Rock Tracks (Billboard)	14

== Release history ==
Release dates and formats for "Hit That"
Region	Date	Format(s)	Label(s)	Ref(s).
United States	November 3, 2003	Mainstream rock; active rock; alternative radio	Columbia	
Japan	November 19, 2003	CD	Sony	
Australia	November 24, 2003	CD	Columbia	
Denmark	January 12, 2004	CD	Columbia	
United Kingdom	January 19, 2004	7-inch vinyl; CD	Columbia	
United States	January 19, 2004	Contemporary hit radio	Columbia	
