= Ixnay on the Hombre =

Studio album by the Offspring
- Released: February 4, 1997
- Recorded: June–October 1996
- Studios: Eldorado Recording, Hollywood
- Genres: Punk rock; skate punk; pop-punk; hardcore punk
- Length: 42:17
- Labels: Columbia; Epitaph
- Producer: Dave Jerden

The Offspring chronology
| Club Me (1997) | Ixnay on the Hombre (1997) | Americana (1998) |

The Offspring studio chronology
| Smash (1994) | Ixnay on the Hombre (1997) | Americana (1998) |

Singles from Ixnay on the Hombre
- 1. "All I Want" Released: January 20, 1997; 2. "Gone Away" Released: March 1997; 3. "The Meaning of Life" Released: August 1997 (Aus/Japan); 4. "I Choose" Released: December 1997 (Aus)

Ixnay on the Hombre is the fourth studio album and major label debut by American rock band the Offspring, released on February 4, 1997, by Columbia Records, as the band's first album on the label. After the massive commercial success of their previous album, Smash (1994), the band entered the studio in the middle of 1996 to record their fourth album and it was the first Offspring album not to be produced by Thom Wilson, instead being produced by Dave Jerden. The title combines Pig Latin ("Ixnay" is the version of the word "nix", familiar in 1940s Hollywood movies) and Spanish ("hombre", "man") to convey the message "fuck The Man", as in "fuck authority".

Ixnay on the Hombre was a moderate commercial success upon its release, debuting at number nine on the US Billboard 200, and was well received by both critics and fans. It was later certified platinum by the RIAA for shipments of over one million copies in the United States, and has sold over three million copies worldwide. Four singles were released from the album: "All I Want", "Gone Away", "The Meaning of Life", and "I Choose".

== Background and recording ==
By the time The Offspring began writing new material for their fourth studio album in 1995–1996, they were the biggest act of Epitaph's roster and had originally declined to leave the label before signing a recording contract with Columbia Records. Following the widespread commercial success of the band's previous album, Smash, frontman Dexter Holland wanted The Offspring to release more albums on Epitaph, or remain on the label for a long time. However, tensions were encountered when Epitaph founder and Bad Religion guitarist Brett Gurewitz decided to sell Smash to a major label in "return for a royalty override on it," an action that the band did not like. Gurewitz had approached several major labels, such as Geffen, Capitol and Sony, in attempt to sign The Offspring. The band eventually signed to Columbia, and Holland recalled that they "took less money" with the label and the signing "was not to try and make more money." Holland also claimed that The Offspring signed to Columbia because they would not "record for someone who thinks [Gurewitz] can force [them] to" and would not "record for a guy who's worse than a major label."

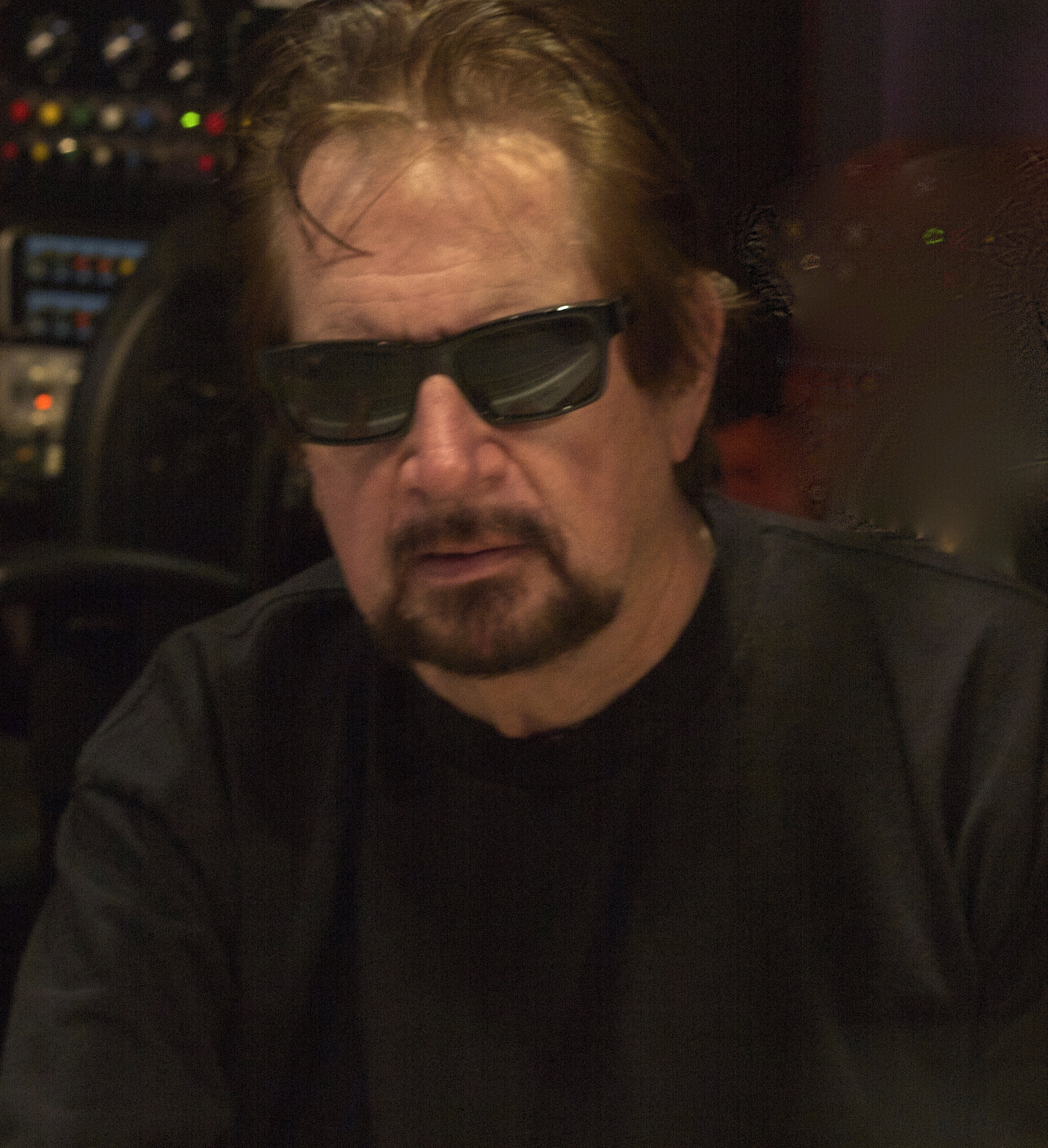
Dave Jerden was hired to produce Ixnay on the Hombre, after the band having Thom Wilson produce their first three albums.

The recording sessions of Ixnay on the Hombre took place from June to October 1996 at Eldorado Recording Studios with producer Dave Jerden, making it the first time The Offspring had not worked with Thom Wilson, who produced the band's previous three albums. On the recording process of the album, guitarist Noodles stated:

We recorded a few more songs than we needed, and if we had used some of the other ones that were left off, it would have ended up a little more risky. But we're not disappointed in what we kept. I think it's a great record and I love these songs. Maybe we'll save the limb-walking for the next one.

Noodles also noted that with Columbia's financing, they had more time to work on the album, specially with the guaranteed studio space - "We did Smash on no budget at all and were constantly calling our studio to find out when it was empty just so we could sneak in at a discount price." - and Holland added that they had "the time to get better sounds."

"Pay the Man" was one of the songs recorded during the Ixnay on the Hombre sessions but instead ended up being released on Americana. "Change the World" is a further development of the unnamed hidden track that appeared at the end of the previous album Smash (in which the guitar riff follows the same melody as the lead guitar in "Genocide"). "Change the World" itself contains a hidden track, a brief spoken piece by Larry "Bud" Melman of The David Letterman Show.

== Release and reception ==
Professional ratings
Review scores
| Source | Rating |
|---|---|
| AllMusic | 2.5/5 stars |
| Entertainment Weekly | B+ |
| NME | 2/10 |
| Rolling Stone | 3.5/5 stars |
| The Rolling Stone Album Guide | 3/5 stars |
| Select | 3/5 stars |
| Spin | 7/10 |
| Sputnikmusic | 5/5 |
| The Sydney Morning Herald | 1/5 stars |
| USA Today | 3/4 stars |

Ixnay on the Hombre was released on February 4, 1997, and is the first Offspring album distributed via Columbia Records. Their former label Epitaph Records released it in Europe because of disagreements between the band and the label's founder Brett Gurewitz. The band was able to release its album on Columbia for the US and other international releases but had to complete the album release in Europe through Epitaph. The Offspring would continue releasing albums on Columbia until it was announced in early 2013 that they had fulfilled their contract with the label.

Ixnay on the Hombre peaked at number 9 on the Billboard 200 album chart.

The AllMusic review by Stephen Thomas Erlewine awards the album 2.5 stars and states: "Ixnay on the Hombre sounds like a competent hard rock band trying to hitch themselves to the post-grunge bandwagon."

== Touring and promotion ==
The Offspring toured relentlessly for almost a year to promote Ixnay on the Hombre. Prior to its release, they headlined the Big Day Out tour in Australia in January–February 1997, along with Soundgarden and The Prodigy. The Ixnay on the Hombre tour kickstarted on February 11, 1997, at Foothill in Long Beach, California, with One Hit Wonder, who had just been signed to Holland's label Nitro Records. A week later, they played five shows in the East Coast of the United States with The Joykiller, which was followed by a ten-date tour with AFI and Strung Out and a European tour with The Vandals and Lunachicks. The Offspring continued to tour over seven-month period from May to December 1997, which included U.S. tours with AFI/L7, Voodoo Glow Skulls/The Joykiller and Hagfish/One Hit Wonder/Good Riddance, as well as a Canadian tour with Doughboys, three Brazilian shows with Charlie Brown Jr., and four shows in Australia with The Living End. Social Distortion also supported The Offspring on selected dates. The Ixnay on the Hombre tour ended on December 18, 1997, in Osaka, Japan, with AFI supporting them.

== Track listing ==
All tracks are written by Dexter Holland, except "Intermission" (music by Irving Caesar, Vincent Youmans; additional lyrics by Holland).

| No. | Title | Length |
|---|---|---|
| 1. | "Disclaimer" | 0:45 |
| 2. | "The Meaning of Life" | 2:56 |
| 3. | "Mota" | 2:57 |
| 4. | "Me & My Old Lady" | 4:33 |
| 5. | "Cool to Hate" | 2:47 |
| 6. | "Leave It Behind" | 1:58 |
| 7. | "Gone Away" | 4:28 |
| 8. | "I Choose" | 3:54 |
| 9. | "Intermission" | 0:48 |
| 10. | "All I Want" | 1:54 |
| 11. | "Way Down the Line" | 2:36 |
| 12. | "Don't Pick It Up" | 1:53 |
| 13. | "Amazed" | 4:25 |
| 14. | "Change the World" | 6:23 |
| Total length: | | 42:17 |

Vinyl bonus track
| No. | Title | Length |
|---|---|---|
| 12. | "Cocktail" | 0:48 |
| Total length: | | 43:05 |

- "Change the World" is followed by the hidden spoken word track "Kiss My Ass" at 6:17 after silence.

== Personnel ==
Credits are adapted from the album's liner notes.

The Offspring

- Dexter Holland – vocals, guitar
- Noodles – guitar, backing vocals
- Greg K. – bass
- Ron Welty – drums

Additional musicians

- Jello Biafra – spoken word on "Disclaimer"
- John Mayer – spoken word on "Intermission"
- Calvert DeForest – spoken word on "Cocktail" and "Kiss My Ass"
- Jason "Blackball" McLean – additional vocals on "Mota"
- Paulinho da Costa – additional percussion
- Davey Havok (credited as Davey Havoc) – backing vocals

Production

- Dave Jerden – production and mixing
- Bryan Carlstrom – engineering
- Brian Jerden – assistant engineering
- Annette Cisneros – assistant engineering
- Eddy Schreyer – mastering
- Bryan Hall – guitar tech
- Sean Evans – art direction
- Enrique Chagoya – cover illustration
- Lisa Haun – photography
- Michael Bolkin – runner

== Charts ==
=== Weekly charts ===
| Chart (1997) | Peak position |
|---|---|
| Australian Albums (ARIA) | 2 |
| Austrian Albums (Ö3 Austria) | 3 |
| Belgian Albums (Ultratop Flanders) | 19 |
| Belgian Albums (Ultratop Wallonia) | 8 |
| Canadian Albums (Billboard) | 3 |
| Czech Albums (IFPI) | 3 |
| Dutch Albums (Album Top 100) | 8 |
| Europe (European Top 100 Albums) | 6 |
| Finnish Albums (Suomen virallinen lista) | 2 |
| French Albums (SNEP) | 3 |
| German Albums (Offizielle Top 100) | 15 |
| Hungarian Albums (MAHASZ) | 31 |
| Icelandic Albums (Tónlist) | 13 |
| Japanese Albums (Oricon) | 20 |
| New Zealand Albums (RMNZ) | 2 |
| Norwegian Albums (VG-lista) | 9 |
| Portuguese Albums (AFP) | 12 |
| Scottish Albums (Official Charts) | 13 |
| Spanish Albums (AFYVE) | 4 |
| Swedish Albums (Sverigetopplistan) | 4 |
| Swiss Albums (Schweizer Hitparade) | 10 |
| UK Albums (OCC) | 9 |
| US Billboard 200 | 9 |

=== Year-end charts ===
| Chart (1997) | Position |
|---|---|
| Australian Albums (ARIA) | 20 |
| Austrian Albums (Ö3 Austria) | 33 |
| Canadian Albums (Nielsen Soundscan) | 52 |
| Canadian Hard Rock Albums (Nielsen Soundscan) | 5 |
| Dutch Albums (Album Top 100) | 54 |
| US Billboard 200 | 78 |

| Chart (1998) | Position |
|---|---|
| Australian Albums (ARIA) | 98 |

=== Singles ===
| Year | Song | Chart | Peak position |
|---|---|---|---|
| 1996 | "All I Want" | Hot Mainstream Rock Tracks | 18 |
| 1996 | "All I Want" | Hot Modern Rock Tracks | 13 |
| 1996 | "All I Want" | Australian Singles Chart | 15 |
| 1996 | "All I Want" | Austrian Singles Chart | 25 |
| 1996 | "All I Want" | UK Singles Chart | 31 |
| 1997 | "Gone Away" | Hot Mainstream Rock Tracks | 1 |
| 1997 | "Gone Away" | Hot Modern Rock Tracks | 4 |
| 1997 | "Gone Away" | Australian Singles Chart | 16 |
| 1997 | "Gone Away" | UK Singles Chart | 42 |
| 1997 | "I Choose" | Hot Mainstream Rock Tracks | 5 |
| 1997 | "I Choose" | Hot Modern Rock Tracks | 24 |

== Certifications ==
| Region | Certification | Certified units/sales |
|---|---|---|
| Australia (ARIA) | 2× Platinum | 140,000^{^} |
| Canada (Music Canada) | 2× Platinum | 200,000^{^} |
| Finland (Musiikkituottajat) | Gold | 26,511 |
| Japan (RIAJ) | Platinum | 200,000^{^} |
| New Zealand (RMNZ) | Gold | 7,500^{^} |
| Spain (Promusicae) | Gold | 50,000^{^} |
| United Kingdom (BPI) | Gold | 100,000^{^} |
| United States (RIAA) | Platinum | 1,000,000^{^} |
Summaries
| Europe (IFPI) | Platinum | 1,000,000^{*} |
| Worldwide | — | 3,200,000 |
^{*} Sales figures based on certification alone.^{^} Shipments figures based on certification alone.
