= Splinter (The Offspring album) =

Studio album by the Offspring
- Released: December 9, 2003
- Recorded: January–August 2003
- Studios: Henson, Hollywood; D-13 Studio, Huntington Beach; Southern Tracks, Atlanta
- Genres: Punk rock; pop-punk
- Length: 32:00
- Label: Columbia
- Producer: Brendan O'Brien

The Offspring chronology
| Conspiracy of One (2000) | Splinter (2003) | Greatest Hits (2005) |

The Offspring studio chronology
| Conspiracy of One (2000) | Splinter (2003) | Rise and Fall, Rage and Grace (2008) |

Singles from Splinter
- 1. "Hit That" Released: November 19, 2003; 2. "(Can't Get My) Head Around You" Released: April 13, 2004; 3. "Spare Me the Details" Released: September 2004 (Aus and NZ)

Splinter is the seventh studio album by American punk rock band the Offspring, released on December 9, 2003, by Columbia Records. It was the first album the band released without long-time drummer Ron Welty, who was fired three weeks before the recording sessions started.

Although not as successful as the Offspring's previous albums, Splinter received gold certification two months after its release. The album received average reviews, but still sold reasonably well, debuting at number 30 on the US Billboard 200 with around 87,000 copies sold in its first week. "Hit That" and "(Can't Get My) Head Around You" were the only two singles to accompany the album; "Spare Me the Details" was also released as a single, but charted only in New Zealand.

== Production and marketing ==
After spending nearly two years supporting the Conspiracy of One album, The Offspring began writing songs for Splinter in late 2002.

The recording sessions for the album lasted from January to August 2003, making it the first time The Offspring had recorded an album for that long (although their next album, 2008's Rise and Fall, Rage and Grace, took more than a year to record).

Three weeks prior to the recording sessions, longtime drummer Ron Welty, who had played on all six of the band's previous albums, was fired from the band and formed his own band, Steady Ground. Welty filed a lawsuit against the band on September 10, 2020 for unpaid royalties, but it was dismissed on March 6, 2023.

Due to the difficulty in finding, or auditioning, for an immediate replacement for Welty on such short notice, the band elected to have session musician Josh Freese play drums on the album; they had met Freese when his band The Vandals was signed by Dexter Holland's label Nitro Records, while Freese also happened to be in town for when they would start recording. Holland noted Freese "did all the drums in just a couple days, and he made it sound like the Offspring, not A Perfect Circle or anything else he does." After the album was finished, Atom Willard was hired to be their new drummer.

Splinter offers a variety of lyrical and musical themes, combining their usual punk rock with experiments into ska and electronic sounds, and comedic songs with heavier themes about fear, paranoia, hopelessness and anxiety. Holland said that “Half this record is pretty much fast, melodic, whatever, punk stuff. But you kind of get bored just doing that after a while. I do.", and also that given most groups are "either a happy band or they're dark", he felt only one side did not fully represent him, "so I really wanted to do both in my music." A case of the mixture was lead single "Hit That", with lyrics about promiscuity creating broken families, with funk-inspired keyboards played by Ronnie King. The lyrics of "Spare Me the Details" were inspired by how a friend of Holland did not like being given a detailed account on how his girlfriend cheated on him.

The crowd vocals in the opening track "Neocon" were recorded at Reading Festival in 2002 during the Offspring's set on the festival's main stage.

There was another song recorded for the album, called "Pass Me By". The band felt that it was too heavy for Splinter, which is why it was not included on the disc.

== Album title ==
On April Fools' Day 2003, the album's title was jokingly announced as Chinese Democracy, the same name of a repeatedly delayed album by Guns N' Roses. Holland quipped, "You snooze, you lose. Axl ripped off my braids, so I ripped off his album title." Holland detailed someone actually suggested Chinese Democracy as the band struggled to think of an album title and instead was saying comedic suggestions like Offspring Bloody Offspring, and that Guns N' Roses considered legal actions but were deterred by how album titles cannot be copyrighted before release. Regarding the name Splinter, which appears in a lyric of "Long Way Home", Holland explained that it reflected how "this record is pretty diverse and splintered", exploring different genres, while also having lyrics "told in first person through these different voices that are slightly demented like a splintered personality."

== Track listing ==
All tracks are written by Dexter Holland.

CD
| No. | Title | Length |
|---|---|---|
| 1. | "Neocon" | 1:06 |
| 2. | "The Noose" | 3:18 |
| 3. | "Long Way Home" | 2:23 |
| 4. | "Hit That" | 2:49 |
| 5. | "Race Against Myself" | 3:32 |
| 6. | "(Can't Get My) Head Around You" | 2:14 |
| 7. | "The Worst Hangover Ever" | 2:58 |
| 8. | "Never Gonna Find Me" | 2:39 |
| 9. | "Lightning Rod" | 3:20 |
| 10. | "Spare Me the Details" | 3:24 |
| 11. | "Da Hui" | 1:42 |
| 12. | "When You're in Prison" | 2:35 |
| Total length: | | 32:00 |

Japanese edition bonus track
| No. | Title | Length |
|---|---|---|
| 13. | "Defy You" (Acoustic) | 3:55 |
| Total length: | | 35:55 |

=== Enhanced version ===
The Enhanced CD portion of the CD contains the following:

- Da Hui Video
- Da Hui Video (with Audio Commentary)
- Demo Studio Tour
- 4 wallpapers
- 2 MP3 tracks:

MP3 tracks
| No. | Title | Length |
|---|---|---|
| 13. | "The Kids Aren't Alright" (Island Style) | 5:08 |
| 14. | "When You're in Prison" (Instrumental) | 2:34 |
| Total length: | | 39:42 |

== Critical reception ==
Professional ratings
Aggregate scores
| Source | Rating |
|---|---|
| Metacritic | 60/100 |
Review scores
| Source | Rating |
| AllMusic | 2.5/5 stars |
| Alternative Press | 3/5 stars |
| Blender | 4/5 stars |
| Drowned in Sound | 4/10 |
| Entertainment Weekly | B− |
| Mojo | 4/5 stars |
| Rolling Stone | 3/5 stars |
| The Rolling Stone Album Guide | 3/5 stars |
| Spin | 5/10 |
| USA Today | 2.5/4 stars |

Similar to Conspiracy of One, has been given a score of 60 out of 100 from Metacritic based on "mixed or average reviews".

Reviewers from sites such as Launch.com claimed Splinter was a welcome return to The Offspring's punk roots, citing songs such as "The Noose" and "Da Hui". The more mainstream songs, "Hit That" and "Spare Me the Details", were also praised.

AllMusic's Johnny Loftus also praised punk songs such as "Long Way Home" and "Lightning Rod", and claimed second single "Head Around You" was the album's standout. However, he criticized songs such as "The Worst Hangover Ever" and "When You're in Prison", calling them 'throwaways'. PopMatters also praised "Head Around You", "Race Against Myself", and other heavier songs on the album. However, it also called "Worst Hangover Ever" 'idiotic' and again criticized "When You're In Prison" and "Neocon". They also criticized the album’s short length, calling it “wasted potential".

In 2017, Loudwire ranked Splinter as the weakest album in the entire Offspring catalogue.

== Personnel ==
The Offspring

- Dexter Holland – vocals, guitar
- Noodles – guitar, backing vocals
- Greg K. – bass, backing vocals

Additional musicians

- Josh Freese – drums
- Ronnie King – keyboards on "Hit That"
- Chris "X-13" Higgins, Jim Lindberg and Jack Grisham – backing vocals
- 2002 Reading Festival Crowd – crowd vocals on "Neocon"
- Mark Moreno – DJ scratching on "The Worst Hangover Ever"
- Phil Jordan – trumpet on "The Worst Hangover Ever"
- Jason Powell – saxophone on "The Worst Hangover Ever"
- Erich Marbach – trombone on "The Worst Hangover Ever"
- Brendan O'Brien – piano on "Spare Me the Details"
- Lauren Kinkade – backing vocals on "When You're in Prison"
- Natalie Leggett, Mario De Leon, Eve Butler, Denyse Buffum, Matt Funes – violins on "When You're in Prison"
- Josefina Vergara – concert master on "When You're in Prison"
- Suzie Katayama – orchestration on "When You're in Prison"
- Larry Corbett – cello on "When You're in Prison"
- Gayle Levant – harp on "When You're in Prison"

Production

- Brendan O'Brien – producer, mixing
- Billy Bowers – engineer
- Nick DiDia – assistant engineer
- Brian Humphrey – assistant engineer
- Phil Martin – assistant engineer
- Kevil Mills – assistant engineer
- Jamie Sickora – assistant engineer
- Karl Egsieker – assistant engineer
- Bryan Cook – assistant engineer
- Steve Masi – guitar technician
- Eddy Schreyer – mastering
- Bernie Grundman – mastering

Artwork

- Sean Evans – art direction
- Justin Beope – CD Art Adaption
- Sarkis Kaloustian – CD Art Adaption
- Rupert Truman – photography
- Storm Thorgerson – design
- Peter Curzon – design
- Darrell Lance Abbott – design

== Charts ==
=== Weekly charts ===
| Chart (2003–2004) | Peak position |
|---|---|
| Australian Albums (ARIA) | 12 |
| Austrian Albums (Ö3 Austria) | 10 |
| Belgian Albums (Ultratop Flanders) | 70 |
| Belgian Albums (Ultratop Wallonia) | 71 |
| Dutch Albums (Album Top 100) | 98 |
| Finnish Albums (Suomen virallinen lista) | 33 |
| French Albums (SNEP) | 19 |
| German Albums (Offizielle Top 100) | 31 |
| Irish Albums (IRMA) | 70 |
| Italian Albums (FIMI) | 40 |
| Japanese Albums (Oricon) | 8 |
| New Zealand Albums (RMNZ) | 27 |
| Polish Albums (ZPAV) | 22 |
| Scottish Albums (Official Charts) | 24 |
| Spanish Albums (AFYVE) | 30 |
| Swedish Albums (Sverigetopplistan) | 56 |
| Swiss Albums (Schweizer Hitparade) | 13 |
| UK Albums (Official Charts) | 27 |
| US Billboard 200 | 30 |

=== Monthly charts ===
| Chart (2003) | Peak position |
|---|---|
| Russian Albums (NFPF) | 7 |

=== Year-end charts ===
| Chart (2004) | Position |
|---|---|
| Australian Albums (ARIA) | 73 |
| Japanese Albums (Oricon) | 61 |
| Swiss Albums (Schweizer Hitparade) | 80 |
| US Billboard 200 | 155 |

== Certifications ==
| Region | Certification | Certified units/sales |
|---|---|---|
| Australia (ARIA) | Platinum | 70,000^{^} |
| France (SNEP) | Gold | 100,000^{*} |
| Japan (RIAJ) | Gold | 100,000^{^} |
| Switzerland (IFPI Switzerland) | Gold | 20,000^{^} |
| United Kingdom (BPI) | Gold | 100,000^{‡} |
| United States (RIAA) | Gold | 500,000^{^} |
Summaries
^{*} Sales figures based on certification alone.^{^} Shipments figures based on certification alone.^{‡} Sales+streaming figures based on certification alone.
