= List of Adler's Appetite and Adler band members =

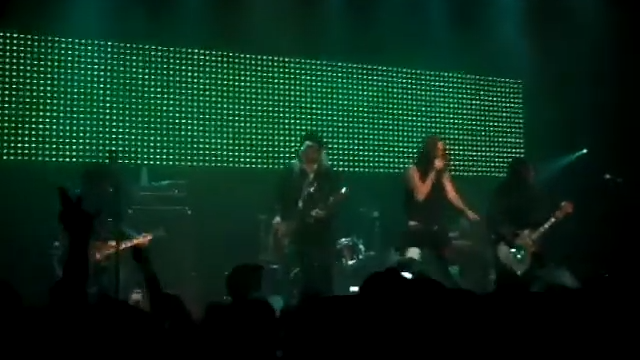
Adler's Appetite performing in 2011.

Adler's Appetite was an American hard rock band from Los Angeles, California. Formed in 2003 by eponymous former Guns N' Roses drummer Steven Adler, the supergroup was originally known as Suki Jones and included vocalist Jizzy Pearl, guitarists Keri Kelli and Brent Muscat, and bassist Robbie Crane. The group disbanded in 2011 and Adler formed an Adler (band) including vocalist Jacob Bunton, guitarist Lonny Paul and bassist Johnny Martin. After Adler broke up in 2017, the drummer kicked off a solo career in 2019, with the current lineup of his new band comprising Adler, Thomas, vocalist Ari Kamin, guitarist Alistair James and bassist Todd Kerns.

== History ==
=== 2003–2011 ===
Suki Jones was unveiled in March 2003, originally including Adler, vocalist Jizzy Pearl (of Ratt, Love/Hate and formerly L.A. Guns), guitarists Keri Kelli (formerly of Slash's Snakepit and L.A. Guns) and Brent Muscat (of Faster Pussycat, and formerly L.A. Guns), and Robbie Crane (of Ratt, and formerly the Vince Neil Band). During an early tour in May, Warrant guitarist Erik Turner temporarily substituted for Muscat, who was touring with Faster Pussycat. The band's name was changed to Adler's Appetite in June, to reflect the band's set list which included many songs from the debut Guns N' Roses album Appetite for Destruction. The following month, Pearl was replaced by Sean Crosby, frontman of AC/DC tribute act Back in Black. However, in August it was announced that Pearl had returned to the group for all upcoming tour dates. By the time the group recorded its self-titled debut EP, Muscat was no longer a member of Adler's Appetite. In March 2005, after the EP's release, Pearl left the band again.

Pearl was replaced by Sheldon Tarsha. Beautiful Creatures guitarist Michael Thomas, Izzy Stradlin's guitarist J.T. Longoria and Enuff Z'nuff bassist Chip Z'nuff subsequently replaced Kelli and Crane. In January 2006, it was reported that Adler had fired the band during a European tour. He later performed with several local musicians, including members of Guns N' Rose tribute bands. Adler addressed the European tour controversy in March, confirming that Tarsha, Thomas, Longoria and Z'nuff were no longer members of Adler's Appetite. The band toured in the summer with Faster Pussycat and Bang Tango, with a lineup including Adler, Crane and Bang Tango members Joe Lesté on vocals and Mark Simpson on guitar. Lesté had previously substituted for Pearl, who was unavailable due to "personal obligations", during a Japanese tour in March 2005. The band subsequently went on hiatus, although the previously unreleased song "Sadder Days" was released in April 2007.

In July 2007, Adler's Appetite's announced a run of summer shows, with the lineup consisting of Adler, Thomas, Z'nuff and new members Colby Veil of Guns N' Roses tribute band Hollywood Roses on vocals, and Kristy Majors of Pretty Boy Floyd on guitar. The band continued touring sporadically, before unveiling a new lineup in late 2008 – in November, former Quiet Riot guitarist Alex Grossi took the place of Majors on guitar, and in December he announced that Tarsha had returned to the group as frontman. The vocalist lasted just one US tour, before departing again in April 2009. He was replaced a few days later by Rick Stitch, and the group returned to touring. In June, former Quiet Riot bassist Chuck Wright temporarily filled in for Z'nuff.

The group began recording its debut album later in the year, with "Alive" released as the first new material in July 2010. "Stardog" and "Fading" were released later in December. In early 2011, Grossi left Adler's Appetite to focus on Quiet Riot, which he had recently rejoined; Stitch's Ladyjack bandmate Robo temporarily substituted for the guitarist, before both members left in March to focus on Ladyjack. Adler's Appetite returned in April with new vocalist Patrick Stone (of Aces 'N' Eights) and guitarist Lonny Paul. Despite news that the group had begun recording new material, in September it was announced that Z'nuff had left the band. Adler quickly clarified the bassist's departure, claiming that he was dismissed due to the drummer's intention to start a new group.

=== 2012–2017 ===
In March 2012, Adler unveiled his new eponymous band Adler, which would include Lynam frontman Jacob Bunton, Adler's Appetite guitarist Lonny Paul and bassist Johnny Martin. The band released its debut album Back from the Dead in November, which was produced by former Dokken and Dio bassist Jeff Pilson. Despite reports that a second album was due for release in February 2016, Adler announced the dissolution of his eponymous band in February 2017 with the claim that "rock and roll doesn't sell".

=== 2019–present ===
After another hiatus, in May 2019 Steven Adler started off with his solo shows in order to celebrate the anniversary of Appetite for Destruction, with the first performance on May 6. His band included his former Adler's Appetite bandmate Michael Thomas, vocalist Ari Kamin, rhythm guitarist Alistair James and bassist Tanya O'Callaghan. In November 2021, O'Callaghan left when Whitesnake hired her to replace long-time bassist Michael Devin, whom that band parted ways with, becoming Whitesnake's first female member and was replaced a few days later by Todd Kerns.

== Members ==
=== Current members ===
Image	Name	Years active	Instruments	Release contributions
	Steven Adler	2003–2006; 2007–2011; 2012–2017; 2018–present	drums	all Adler's Appetite and Adler releases
	Michael Thomas	2005–2006; 2007–2011; 2018–present	lead guitar	South America Destruction (2005); Alive (2012)
	Alistair James	2018–present	rhythm guitar; backing vocals	none as yet
	Ari Kamin	2018–present	lead vocals	none as yet
	Todd Kerns	2021–present	bass; backing vocals	none as yet

=== Former members ===
Image	Name	Years active	Instruments	Release contributions
	Robbie Crane	2003–2005; 2006	bass	Adler's Appetite (EP) (2005); "Sadder Days" (2007)
	Keri Kelli (Kenneth Fear Jr.)	2003–2005	lead guitar	Adler's Appetite (EP) (2005); "Sadder Days" (2007)
	Brent Muscat	2003–2004	rhythm guitar	none
	Jizzy Pearl (James Wilkinson)	2003; 2003–2005	vocals	Adler's Appetite (2005)
	Sean Crosby	2003	vocals	none
	Sheldon Tarsha (later Seann Nicols)	2005–2006; 2008–2009	vocals	South America Destruction (2005); "Sadder Days" (2007)
	Chip Z'nuff (Gregory Rybarski)	2005–2006; 2007–2011	bass	South America Destruction (2005); Alive (2012)
	J. T. Longoria	2005–2006	rhythm guitar	South America Destruction (2005)
	Joe Lesté	2006	vocals	none
	Mark Simpson	2006	guitar	none
	Colby Veil	2007–2008	vocals	none
	Kristy Majors	2007–2008	guitar	none
	Alex Grossi	2008–2011	guitar	Alive (2012)
	Rick Stitch	2009–2011	vocals	Alive (2012)
	Patrick Stone	2011	vocals	none
	Lonny Paul	2011; 2012–2017 (as Adler)	guitar; backing vocals	Back from the Dead (2012)
	Jacob Bunton	2012–2017 (as Adler)	vocals; guitar; piano	Back from the Dead (2012)
	Johnny Martin	2012–2017 (as Adler)	bass; backing vocals	Back from the Dead (2012)
	Constantine Maroulis	2018	vocals	none
	Carl Restivo	2018	rhythm guitar	none
	Sean McNabb	2018	bass	none
	Tanya O'Callaghan	2018–2021	bass; backing vocals	none

=== Touring musicians ===
Image	Name	Years active	Instruments	Release contributions
	Erik Turner	2003	guitar	Turner filled in for Muscat, who was touring with Faster Pussycat, during a United States tour in May 2003.
	Chuck Wright	2009	bass	Wright temporarily substituted for Z'nuff in June and July 2009, although no reason was given for the change.
	Robo	2011	guitar	Robo filled in for Alex Grossi on a European tour in February 2011, after the guitarist left to focus on Quiet Riot.

== Lineups ==
Names in bold represent new members.

Period	Members	Releases
March – July 2003 (Adler's Appetite)	Steven Adler – drums; Jizzy Pearl – vocals; Keri Kelli – guitar; Brent Muscat – guitar; Robbie Crane – bass	none
July – August 2003 (Adler's Appetite)	Steven Adler – drums; **Sean Crosby – vocals**; Keri Kelli – guitar; Brent Muscat – guitar; Robbie Crane – bass	none
August 2003 – November 2004 (Adler's Appetite)	Steven Adler – drums; **Jizzy Pearl – vocals**; Keri Kelli – guitar; Brent Muscat – guitar; Robbie Crane – bass	none
November 2004 – March 2005 (Adler's Appetite)	Steven Adler – drums; Jizzy Pearl – vocals; Keri Kelli – guitar; Robbie Crane – bass	Adler's Appetite (EP) (2005)
April – October 2005 (Adler's Appetite)	Steven Adler – drums; **Sheldon Tarsha – vocals**; Keri Kelli – guitar; Robbie Crane – bass	"Sadder Days" (2007)
October 2005 – January 2006 (Adler's Appetite)	Steven Adler – drums; Sheldon Tarsha – vocals; **Michael Thomas – guitar**; **J.T. Longoria – guitar**; **Chip Z'nuff – bass**	South America Destruction (2005)
Summer 2006 (Adler's Appetite)	Steven Adler – drums; **Joe Lesté – vocals**; **Mark Simpson – guitar**; **Robbie Crane – bass**	none
July 2007 – November 2008 (Adler's Appetite)	Steven Adler – drums; **Colby Veil – vocals**; **Michael Thomas – guitar**; **Kristy Majors – guitar**; **Chip Z'nuff – bass**	none
November 2008 – April 2009 (Adler's Appetite)	Steven Adler – drums; **Sheldon Tarsha – vocals**; Michael Thomas – guitar; **Alex Grossi – guitar**; Chip Z'nuff – bass	none
April 2009 – April 2011 (Adler's Appetite)	Steven Adler – drums; **Rick Stitch – vocals**; Michael Thomas – guitar; Alex Grossi – guitar; Chip Z'nuff – bass	Alive (2012)
April – November 2011 (Adler's Appetite)	Steven Adler – drums; **Patrick Stone – vocals**; Michael Thomas – guitar; **Lonny Paul – guitar**; Chip Z'nuff – bass	none
Band inactive November 2011 – January 2012
February 2012 – February 2017 (Adler)	Steven Adler – drums; **Jacob Bunton – vocals, guitar, piano**; Lonny Paul – guitar, backing vocals; **Johnny Martin – bass, backing vocals**	Back from the Dead (2012)
Band inactive March 2017 – April 2019
May 2019 – November 2021 (Steven Adler)	Steven Adler – drums; **Ariel Kamin – lead vocals**; Michael Thomas – lead guitar; **Alistair James – rhythm guitar, backing vocals**; **Tanya O'Callaghan – bass, backing vocals**	none
November 2021 – present (Steven Adler)	Steven Adler – drums; Ariel Kamin – lead vocals; Michael Thomas – lead guitar; Alistair James – rhythm guitar, backing vocals; **Todd Kerns – bass, backing vocals**	none to date
