= Amy Ramsey =

Hair stylist

Amy Ramsey (born 1981) is a professional hair stylist and winner of The Rock Style Awards' Celebrity Hairdresser of the Year 2010 in the "Metal Category".

Ramsey is well known among the Los Angeles heavy metal and rock'n'roll community for her innovative hairstyles. She has worked with many well known bands and musicians including Marilyn Manson, Lifehouse, Carcass, Morbid Angel, Anvil, Mastodon, Clutch and Kenny Loggins.

Ramsey was recently named as the personal hair stylist for Steven Adler's 2010 world tour with his band Adler's Appetite.

Amy released her own line of natural and organic hair products in October 2009. Called "AmyHair," the products are innovative because they can be used by both people and their pets. Ramsey donates 35% of the profits from AmyHair to "Beyoncé's House," a home for stray pets in Valley Village, California that Amy named for her voluptuous puppy Millie who she claims "has hips like Beyoncé."

== Awards ==
- The Rock Style Awards' Celebrity Hairdresser of the Year 2010 in the "Metal Category"
- 2009 "Coiff of Ages" Best Rock Hairstylist Lifetime Achievement Award
- 2008 "More Than Mullets" Metal Hairstylist of the Year
- 2007 "AquaNet Spray Style of The Year" third runner-up
- 2007 Kiss and Makeup Beauty Awards 2007: Best Blow Dry
