= Adler's Appetite =

American rock band

- Origin: Los Angeles, California, U.S.
- Genres: Hard rock; heavy metal
- Years active: 2003–2011
- Label: Shrapnel
- Past members: Steven Adler; Michael Thomas; Chip Z'nuff; Patrick Stone; Lonny Paul; See below
- Website: adlersappetite.com

Adler's Appetite was an American rock band from Los Angeles, formed in 2003. Along with original material, the band performs covers of drummer and namesake Steven Adler's former band Guns N' Roses, primarily songs from the album Appetite for Destruction.

Former Slash's Snakepit guitarist Keri Kelli first formed the band in 2003, with the original lineup consisting of Adler, Faster Pussycat guitarist Brent Muscat, former Ratt bassist Robbie Crane as well as then-Ratt singer Jizzy Pearl, also formerly of Love/Hate. The band toured the US and Europe, with a number of musicians filling in for band members due to touring commitments. Following the departure of Muscat in 2004, they recorded and released the Adler's Appetite EP in January 2005. The same year, Adler announced a new lineup of the band, adding singer Sheldon Tarsha (formerly of Icon and Quiet Riot), Enuff Z'Nuff bassist Chip Z'nuff, former Beautiful Creatures and Tuff guitarist Michael Thomas as well as Izzy Stradlin guitarist JT Longoria in place of Pearl, Crane and Kelli.

In 2007, Hollywood Roses singer Colby Veil replaced Tarsha, and Pretty Boy Floyd guitarist Kristy Majors replaced Longoria. The following year, Tarsha returned to the band, while Majors was replaced by former Quiet Riot and Beautiful Creatures guitarist Alex Grossi. Tarsha's return would be short-lived, once again departing the band with Ladyjack vocalist Rick Stitch joining in his place. With this lineup, they released the singles "Alive," "Stardog" and "Fading" in 2010. When Quiet Riot reformed the same year, Grossi departed Adler's Appetite in 2011, with Ladyjack guitarist Robo filling in for a European tour. However, following the tour, both Stitch and Robo departed the band, replaced by Aces 'N' Eights singer Patrick Stone as well as guitarist Lonnie Paul, former lead singer of Tilterworld and former Still Standing guitarist. The band dissolved once the tour was completed, with Adler and Paul forming new band "Adler".

== History ==
=== Early years and formation (2003–2004) ===
"Steven said that so many people came up to him at the [recent] Suki shows and told him that they had no idea that it was the former Guns N' Roses drummer's new band! Steven wants there to be no question that he is in the band, and while they are playing the Appetite For Destruction material, he believes that Adler's Appetite is more appropriate and less confusing."

— Statement released on name change.

After being fired from Guns N' Roses in 1990, drummer Steven Adler worked on a number of projects, reforming pre-Guns N' Roses band Road Crew, with members of Vain, and briefly joining BulletBoys, before joining a band, in 2003, formed by former Slash's Snakepit guitarist Keri Kelli, which also consisted of Faster Pussycat guitarist Brent Muscat, former Ratt bassist Robbie Crane as well as then-Ratt singer Jizzy Pearl, also formerly of Love/Hate. Choosing the name Suki Jones, the band toured the US, making their live debut in Kingman, Arizona in March of the same year. Their sets included songs from the Guns N' Roses albums Appetite for Destruction, G N' R Lies as well as the Live from the Jungle EP and songs by AC/DC, Thin Lizzy, Aerosmith, Led Zeppelin, and Queen. For a May tour of the East Coast, Suki Jones enlisted Warrant guitarist Erik Turner to fill in for Muscat, who had prior touring commitments with Faster Pussycat.

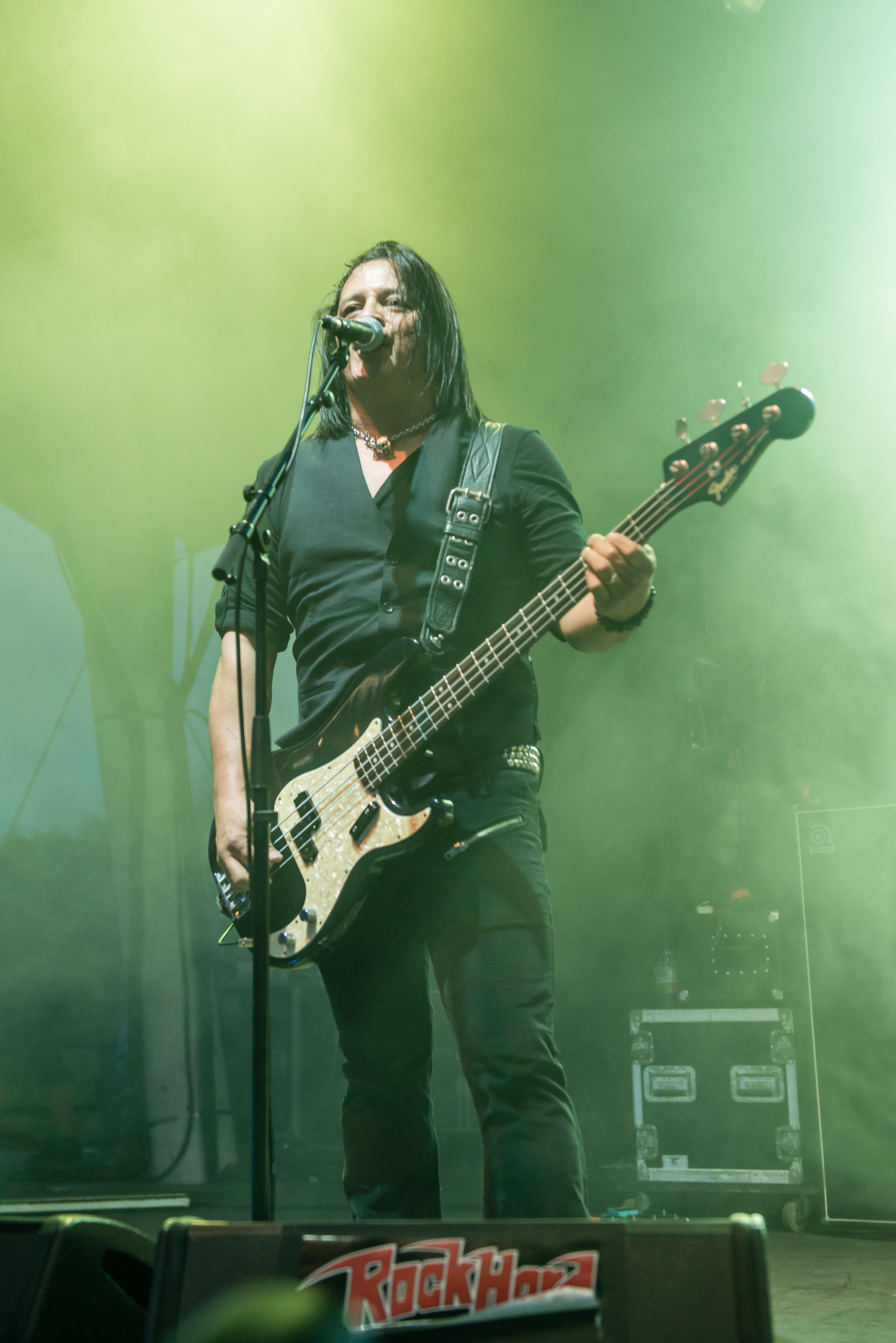
Founding member, bassist Robbie Crane.

The following month, they renamed the band Adler's Appetite, after Adler and the Appetite for Destruction album that they performed material from regularly. The band briefly parted ways with singer Pearl, who was replaced by Sean Crosby, before he rejoined the band months later. For 20th Anniversary of Appetite For Destruction, Adler's Appetite performed a show at the Key Club in Hollywood where they were joined onstage by Adler's former Guns N' Roses bandmates, Duff McKagan and Izzy Stradlin, for renditions of "Mr. Brownstone," "Paradise City" and "Knockin' on Heaven's Door". L.A. Guns also played that night. A tour of Europe and the US followed from January–February 2004, however, a number of the US shows were canceled, after the promoter failed to pay for transport and the band for the shows they performed. Adler's Appetite began writing material for their debut album and signed with Shrapnel Records for its release. A tour of Europe followed from June 25 – July 10, preceded by two US shows in May, during which former Beautiful Creatures and Tuff guitarist Michael Thomas filled in for Kelli, who had joined Vince Neil's solo band.

=== Adler's Appetite EP and lineup changes (2004–2006) ===
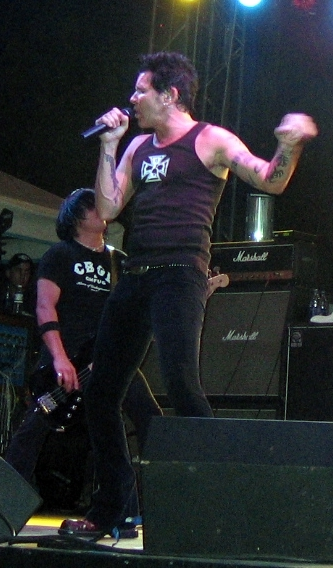
Founding member, vocalist Jizzy Pearl

Adler's Appetite began pre-production on their new album in September, with recording of an EP beginning in November. However, prior to recording, guitarist Muscat departed Adler's Appetite. Self-produced, they recorded the album at Dinky Music Recording Studios, in Corona, California, and Vibeville, in Irvine, California. The EP entitled Adler's Appetite featured four original songs and two covers; "Hollywood" by Thin Lizzy and "Draw the Line" by Aerosmith. A cover of Hanoi Rocks song "Obscured" was to be included on the EP, but was replaced with the Thin Lizzy cover. Adler's Appetite was completed and released, through the band's official website, in January 2005, and was followed by a tour of the US, UK and Europe. They were to support Hanoi Rocks for one show in the UK. However, they soon pulled out after Adler made disparaging comments about Hanoi Rocks guitarist Andy McCoy's wife during an interview. For a number of the headlining shows, guitarist Craig Bedford filled in for Kelli.

For a March tour of Japan, Adler's Appetite enlisted Bang Tango and Beautiful Creatures singer Joe Lesté to fill in for Pearl, who cited personal obligations for his absence. Following the tour, it was announced that they had parted ways with Pearl, though he left on good terms with singer Sheldon Tarsha brought in as his replacement. A three-date tour of Argentina followed, with the lineup consisting of Adler and Tarsha along with substitute musicians Enuff Z'nuff bassist Chip Z'nuff, former Beautiful Creatures guitarist Michael Thomas and Izzy Stradlin guitarist JT Longoria, in place of Kelli and Crane, who couldn't take part in the tour due to other commitments. A number of US shows preceded the Argentina tour. Along with Brides of Destruction and then-former L.A. Guns guitarist Tracii Guns, Adler's Appetite, were to tour Asia, in August, under the band name "Guns N' Roses Revisited". However, the tour was soon canceled when they were told, by Axl Rose's lawyers, that they could not use the Guns N' Roses logo. Adler's Appetite announced a tour of the US, UK and Europe was, taking place from December 31, 2005, to February 11, 2006, as well as plans to release a full-length album the same year. Adler announced prior to the tour that the lineup that toured Argentina was in fact the official new lineup of the band, and that Kelli and Crane had departed the band prior to the tour of Argentina.

Kelli, Crane, and Pearl threatened legal action, stating that none of them quit Adler's Appetite and that the "name and logo are registered trademarks owned by the partnership and its four remaining founding partners (Adler, Kelli, Crane, and Pearl)." They also revealed that no single member could hire or fire another without a majority vote from all four partners. Crane revealed that had Adler dealt with the situation properly, they would have given him the band name and partnership. Several shows into Adler's Appetite European tour, which saw GYPSY PISTOLEROS supporting, Adler reportedly fired the new lineup, hiring UK Guns 2' Roses tribute band to replace them, with Z'nuff and Tarsha stating on stage, in Bochum, Germany, that it was Adler's Appetite last show. Ultimately these claims were unfounded, although Thomas left the band at the culmination of the tour. Following the European tour, the band appeared at the Rock the Boat festival, traveling between Oslo, Norway and Fredrikshavn, Denmark, in April, with a tour of the US with Bang Tango and Faster Pussycat following in the summer. The band went on hiatus following the conclusion of this tour.

=== Hiatus and return to touring (2006–2009) ===
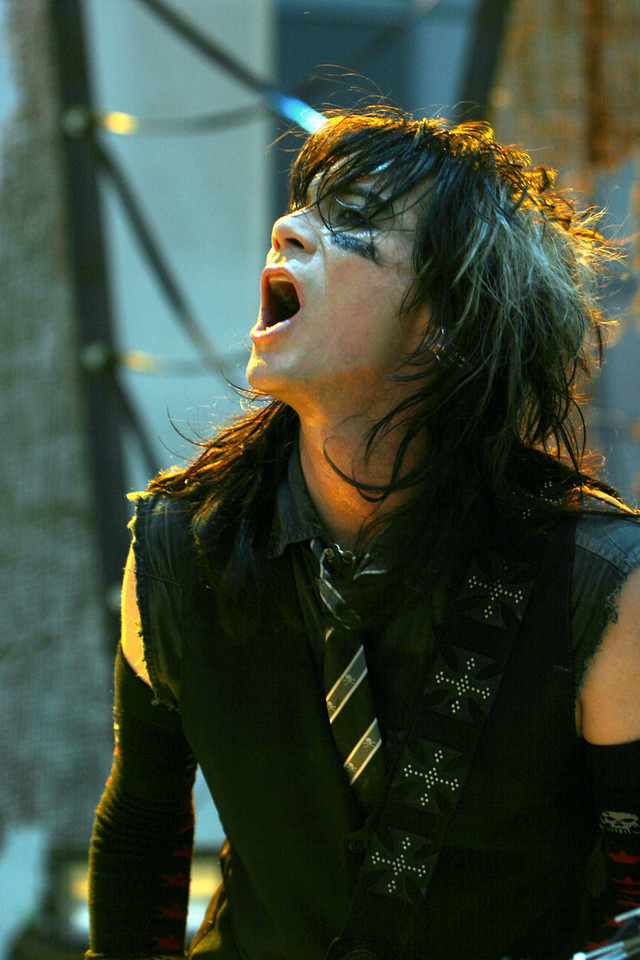
founding guitarist Keri Kelli.

During the period of inactivity, an unreleased song entitled "Sadder Days," featuring original members Kelli and Crane as well as Tarsha on lead vocals, was posted online in April 2007. It was soon followed by "Keep Satisfied".

Adler's Appetite reformed in 2007, with a lineup that included Adler and Z'nuff with a returning Michael Thomas and Kristy Majors of Pretty Boy Floyd replacing Longoria on guitars, and Colby Veil of Guns 'N' Roses cover band Hollywood Roses replacing Tarsha as lead vocalist. They first performed at Rocklahoma and then proceeded to tour the US from July 28 to August 10 of the same year. The band played a show at the Key Club in Hollywood on July 28, as part of their tour celebrating the 20th anniversary of Appetite for Destruction. During the show, Adler's Appetite were joined onstage by former Guns N' Roses members Izzy Stradlin and Duff McKagan, with Slash also attending the show. During a performance in Mexico City on the tour, Adler fell ill and was treated by paramedics, though he was not hospitalized. A European tour, that was to take place from November 21 – December 15, was canceled with Adler citing personal issues.

The following year, Adler's Appetite played the South Texas Rock Festival on July 12. Kristy Majors was then replaced by a new guitarist Alex Grossi, formerly of Quiet Riot, Angry Salad, and Beautiful Creatures, in November 2008. The previous month, Adler and Z'nuff formed a supergroup called Guns of Destruction, with L.A. Guns and former Brides of Destruction guitarist Tracii Guns, making their debut on November 19. The band was short-lived and Adler's Appetite scheduled a tour for the beginning of 2009 with Tarsha rejoining the band in place of Veil. They embarked on their first full US tour that took place from February 21 – March 20, 2009.

=== Lineup changes and dissolution (2009–2011) ===
Following Adler's Appetite's US tour, Tarsha departed the band, in April, to concentrate on his original band. Later Tarsha joined Phoenix band Icon and appeared at Rocklahoma as their frontman before changing his name to Seann Nicols and briefly joining Quiet Riot. He was subsequently replaced by Ladyjack singer Rick Stitch, with the band announcing more US shows, taking place from April 17 – August 15, as well as dates in Brazil and Argentina. From June to July 5, former Quiet Riot bassist Chuck Wright filled in for Z'nuff. Adler's Appetite also began recording new material in July, with hopes of releasing it by the end of 2009.

Adler's Appetite released their first new material, since 2005, with the single "Alive," released in conjunction with Adler's autobiography, My Appetite for Destruction: Sex, and Drugs, and Guns N' Roses, on July 29, 2010, with a full version released later in the year. The song was later licensed for use on Speed TV's WindTunnel with Dave Despain. Following a 50 date US tour, they began recording their debut album in November with Cinderella drummer Fred Coury producing. The following month they released two more singles entitled "Stardog" and "Fading", which was followed by a tour of Europe and the UK, during which Ladyjack guitarist Robo filled in for Grossi so as to let Grossi rejoin Quiet Riot (with Grossi quitting the band altogether shortly after), taking place from February 10–28. During a show in London, Duff McKagan joined the band onstage for renditions of "My Michelle" and "It's So Easy." After the tour, both Stitch and Robo departed Adler's Appetite to focus on Ladyjack. In April, the band announced that Aces 'N' Eights singer Patrick Stone had replaced Stitch, while they also added guitarist Lonny Paul to the lineup to replace Grossi. while, the following month, Z'nuff announced the band had signed a new record deal, though he could not reveal the label's name. Adler's Appetite began recording new material on September 26, at NRG Recording Studios. However, it was announced two days later that Z'nuff and Stone were no longer a member of the band, with Adler citing his forming a new band (and subsequent dissolution of Adler's Appetite), with Thomas, Paul, and an unknown singer, as the reasons for his departure. Later it was revealed that Adler's new band was to be named "Adler", and that Thomas was no longer part of the project, leaving only Adler and Paul from Adler's Appetite in the new band. The founding lineup of the new band consisted of Adler, Paul, former Mars Electric vocalist Jacob Bunton and L.A. Guns bassist Johnny Martin.

== Members ==
Final lineup

- Steven Adler – drums (2003–2011)
- Michael Thomas – lead guitar (2005–2011)
- Chip Z'Nuff - bass guitar (2005-2011)
- Patrick Stone - lead vocals (2011)
- Lonny Paul - rhythm guitar (2011)

== Discography ==
EPs

- Adler's Appetite (EP) (2005)
- Sadder Days (2007)
- Alive (2010)
