= Kiss or Kill =

Kiss or Kill may refer to:

- Kiss or Kill (1997 film), an Australian film directed by Bill Bennett
- Kiss or Kill (album), an album by Endeverafter
- Kiss or Kill (1918 film), a silent film
