= Back from the Dead (Adler album) =

Studio album by Adler
- Released: November 26, 2012
- Recorded: January–April 2012
- Studios: Pilsongs Studio, Santa Clarita, CA
- Genre: Hard rock
- Length: 40:02
- Label: New Ocean Media
- Producers: Jeff Pilson, Adler

Back from the Dead is the only studio album by American rock band Adler, released on November 26, 2012, on New Ocean Media. The album's release was preceded by the single "The One That You Hated", which was released on April 10, 2012, via iTunes. It was the first album that Steven Adler was completely involved with after he left Guns N' Roses (not including the two EPs that are only sold through certain internet websites during his previous time with the band Adler's Appetite), and the first full-length album he played all drum tracks on since Appetite for Destruction. The album was recorded from January 2012 to April 2012 in Los Angeles with producer Jeff Pilson and mixed by Jay Ruston.

== Track listings ==
All songs credited to Adler and Jeff Pilson

No.	Title	Writer(s)	Length
1.	"Back from the Dead"	Jacob Bunton, Lonny Paul, Jeff Pilson	4:17
2.	"Own Worst Enemy"	Bunton, Paul	3:22
3.	"Another Version of the Truth"	Bunton, Paul, Pilson	3:25
4.	"The One That You Hated"	Bunton, Paul	3:06
5.	"Good to Be Bad"	Bunton, Paul	3:19
6.	"Just Don't Ask"	Bunton	4:50
7.	"Blown Away"	Bunton	3:06
8.	"Waterfall"	Bunton, Paul	3:55
9.	"Habit"	Paul	3:23
10.	"Your Diamonds"	Bunton	4:08
11.	"Dead Wrong"	Bunton, Paul	3:09
Total length:			40:02

== Personnel ==
- Jacob Bunton – lead vocals, guitar, mandolin and piano
- Lonny Paul – guitar, vocals
- Steven Adler – drums, cowbell, shakers, tambourine, crowbar, shovel & screams
- Johnny Martin – bass, vocals

Additional musicians

- Jeff Pilson – bass on all tracks, six-string guitar, keyboards & vocals
- Slash – lead guitar on "Just Don't Ask"
- John 5 – lead guitar on "Good to Be Bad"
- Michael Lord – piano on "Waterfall"

Production personnel

- Jeff Pilson – production
- Jeff Pilson – engineering
- Jay Ruston – mixing
- Jason Elgin – additional recording
- Paul Logus – mastering

== Miscellaneous ==
- Adler frontman Jacob Bunton has said that there were thirteen tracks recorded for the album, though the CD only features eleven tracks.
- Both Jacob Bunton and Steven Adler have said, "When you hear this album, you hear everything from Journey, to Foo Fighters, to Guns N' Roses, to Elton John, to Lynyrd Skynyrd". Steven Adler also said "I'm not saying it's gonna be the next Appetite for Destruction, but there hasn't been a hard rock 'n' roll record out there that has feeling and soul and feel to it. I think we've come pretty close".
- Jacob Bunton has said "The process of making this record was incredible, our musical influences are all over the place, and this record is a perfect reflection of everything we love about rock n' roll. Steven Adler said "I'm so proud of this record, this is the record I've been wanting to make for over 20 years, and now I've finally found the band with the perfect chemistry to make it happen!"
- When Steven Adler was asked if his new album was better than the latest Guns N' Roses album Chinese Democracy, he remarked "Of course it is".
- Steven Adler also said "I haven't been this excited since the early days of GNR, and couldn't be happier with the way the record turned out. It was the record I wanted to make for 25 years, and can't wait for everyone to hear it".
- Steven uses Vater sticks, Rockett Drums and Paiste cymbals and Jacob uses Charvel Guitars, Fender Guitars, Bourgeois Guitars, Diezel Amplification, Audio Technica, Radial Engineering, and GHS strings for the new album.
- The art direction and concept was done by Lonny Paul, the layout and design was done by Ryan Russel, and Publicist was Doug Weber. The photographs were done by Liz Taylor of Smacdab Media, Carolina Adler, and Ryan Russel.
- A line from track eleven song "Dead Wrong" says "you never shut up" in the lyric booklet, when the song clearly seems to say "(you're) talking too much" when listened to.
- The lyric booklet also comes in two different designs, both black with red printing, and red with black printing on the front covers.
