= Bling! Bling! =

Studio album by Lynam
- Released: 2003
- Genre: Rock
- Label: EMG

Lynam chronology
White Trash Superstar (2002)	Bling! Bling! (2003)	Life in Reverse (2004)

Bling! Bling! is the second studio album released by Alabama rock group Lynam. The tracks "Losing Venus" and "Never Fade Away" were later re-released on the band's fourth studio album, Slave to the Machine. "Disco King" and "Bemused" originally appeared on Fame Among the Vulgar, the second album released by lead singer Jacob Bunton's first band, Mars Electric. Currently, if you purchase the album from iTunes, the track "Punk" has been replaced by "Left for Dead."

== Track listing ==
No.	Title	Length
1.	"Della"	03:21
2.	"Disco King"	03:12
3.	"Waste My Life"	02:17
4.	"Dixie River Gun Runners"	00:54
5.	"Bemused"	03:42
6.	"Gonna Getchoo"	02:09
7.	"It's All Over Now"	03:20
8.	"Losing Venus"	04:37
9.	"Never Fade Away"	02:48
10.	"Punk"	02:42
11.	"Left for Dead" (iTunes only)
