= Gotta Get Out =

Gotta Get Out may refer to:

- "Gotta Get Out", a song by 5 Seconds of Summer from the EP Somewhere New
- "Gotta Get Out", a song by Alec Empire from the album Futurist
- "Gotta Get Out", a song by the Bicycles from the album The Good, the Bad and the Cuddly
- "Gotta Get Out", a song by Endeverafter from the album Kiss or Kill
- Gotta Get Out, a 2026 album by the Linda Lindas
