= Steven Adler =

American drummer (born 1965)

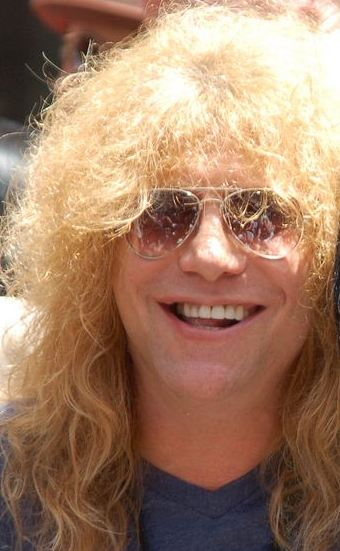
- Adler in 2012

Background information
- Born: Michael Coletti; January 22, 1965 (age 61); Cleveland, Ohio, U.S.
- Origin: Los Angeles, California, U.S.
- Genres: Hard rock; heavy metal; glam metal
- Occupations: Musician; songwriter
- Instrument: Drums
- Years active: 1982–1991; 1998–present
- Formerly of: Adler's Appetite; Guns N' Roses; Adler; BulletBoys

Steven Adler (born Michael Coletti; January 22, 1965) is an American musician. He was the drummer and co-songwriter of the hard rock band Guns N' Roses, with whom he achieved worldwide success in the late 1980s.

Adler played on Guns N' Roses' first two albums, Appetite for Destruction (1987) and G N' R Lies (1988). During the recording of the double-album Use Your Illusion I and Use Your Illusion II in 1990, he was fired from Guns N' Roses over his heroin addiction, but was featured on the track "Civil War". He reformed his pre-Guns N' Roses band Road Crew before ending his career in 1991. After years of personal struggles, he returned to music in 1998 by briefly joining BulletBoys. From 2003 to 2011, Adler was the drummer for his own band Adler's Appetite, and from 2012 to 2017, he held the same position in the band Adler. He has been performing tours as a solo artist since 2019.

Adler appeared on the second (2008) and fifth (2011) seasons of the reality TV show Celebrity Rehab with Dr. Drew, as well as on the first season of its spin-off Sober House (2009). He was inducted into the Rock and Roll Hall of Fame in 2012 as a member of Guns N' Roses.

== Life and career ==
=== 1965–1984: Early life and career ===
Steven Adler was born Michael Coletti in Cleveland, Ohio, to an Italian-American father, Michael Coletti, and a Jewish-American mother, Deanna. After his father left the family, his mother moved with her children to Los Angeles, California. Adler was originally named after his father at birth, but his mother renamed him Steven when she returned to her parents because Jewish naming conventions forbid naming children after living relatives. He took his stepfather's surname after his mother married Melvin Adler, who adopted her two oldest children (including Steven). He has one older brother, Kenny, and a younger half-brother, Jamie. Adler grew up in the San Fernando Valley until the age of 13, when he was sent to live with his grandparents in Hollywood due to his bad behavior. While attending Bancroft Junior High School, Adler befriended Saul Hudson, later known as Slash; they met when Adler had a skateboarding accident and Slash stopped to help him. After ninth grade, Adler returned to his parents' house in the Valley for the remainder of high school, during which time he learned to play drums.

After his return to Hollywood in 1983, Adler auditioned for Sunset Strip staple London. When the audition proved unsuccessful, he formed the band Road Crew—named after the Motörhead song "(We Are) The Road Crew"—with his childhood friend Slash. They placed an advertisement in a newspaper looking for a bassist, and received a response from Duff McKagan. They auditioned a number of singers, including one-time Black Flag vocalist Ron Reyes, and worked on material that included the main riff of what would become the Guns N' Roses song "Rocket Queen." Slash disbanded the group the following year due to their inability to find an adequate lead vocalist, as well as Adler's laziness compared to himself and McKagan. Adler then briefly joined local band Hollywood Rose, which featured singer Axl Rose and guitarist Izzy Stradlin (who left shortly after).

=== 1985–1990: Guns N' Roses ===
Adler in 1987

In June 1985, Adler joined Guns N' Roses, which was newly founded by Axl Rose, Izzy Stradlin, and L.A. Guns members Tracii Guns, Ole Beich and Rob Gardner. After the original drummer Gardner quit, Adler and Slash joined their former Road Crew bandmate Duff McKagan (who joined in March 1985) to complete the line-up. They played nightclubs—such as the Whisky a Go Go, The Roxy, and The Troubadour—and opened for larger acts throughout 1985 and 1986. After being scouted by several major record labels, the band signed with Geffen Records in March 1986.

In July 1987, Guns N' Roses released its debut album, Appetite for Destruction, which to date has sold over 30 million copies worldwide, 18 million of which were in the United States, making it the best-selling debut album of all time in the US. In December, during a tour with Alice Cooper, an intoxicated Adler broke his hand when he punched a streetlight after a barroom brawl; Fred Coury of Cinderella was brought in as his substitute for several shows until he recovered. In November 1988, Guns N' Roses released G N' R Lies, which sold over five million copies in the US alone, despite containing only eight tracks, four of which were included on the previously released EP Live ?!*@ Like a Suicide.

Adler was again absent during a performance at the American Music Awards in January 1989; Don Henley filled in for him on drums. His absence was originally attributed to a case of the flu, but it was later revealed that Adler had been in a drug rehabilitation program at the time. The following October, during a show as opening act for The Rolling Stones, Axl Rose threatened to leave the band if certain members of the band did not stop "dancing with Mr. Brownstone," a reference to their song of the same name about heroin use. Adler was among those who promised to clean up, but he continued to struggle with his addiction.

Adler was briefly fired from the band over his drug use in early 1990, but he was reinstated after signing a contract in which he vowed to stop taking drugs. However, by the time the band entered the studio to record the song "Civil War", his addiction had become so severe that he was unable to perform. By Adler's own admission, he tried to play the song "20, maybe 30 times". The song's drum track had to be heavily edited for his bandmates to be able to play along with it. When problems in the studio continued, causing recording sessions to abort for several days at a time, Adler was formally fired from Guns N' Roses on July 11, 1990. He had played his final show with the band on April 7 at Farm Aid IV.

Izzy Stradlin, who left the band in November 1991, later stated that replacing Adler with Matt Sorum of The Cult had a big impact on the band's sound. In response to an interviewer's suggestion that the line-up change had turned Guns N' Roses from a rock 'n' roll band into a heavy metal one, Stradlin said, "Yeah, a big musical difference. ... [Our songs] were written with Steve playing the drums and his sense of swing was the push and pull that give the songs their feel. When that was gone, it was just...unbelievable, weird. Nothing worked. I would have preferred to continue with Steve, but we'd had two years off and we couldn't wait any longer."

=== 1990–2002: Post-Guns N' Roses troubles and hiatus ===
Following his departure from Guns N' Roses, he was one of several drummers who auditioned to join AC/DC. However Adler claims that AC/DC's manager withdrew an offer, following Axl Rose announcing Adler's firing and branding him a drug addict onstage at the MTV Video Music Awards in September 1990. Adler instead reformed Road Crew with a new line-up, consisting of former Vain members singer Davy Vain, guitarist Jamie Scott, and bassist Ashley Mitchell, along with guitarist Shawn Rorie. They recorded an album and attracted attention from a major label, but due to Adler's persistent drug problems, the group disbanded shortly thereafter. Adler then entered a prolonged, self-imposed exile from the music industry; he later recalled, "I wish I could say that I did a lot of traveling or self-improvement, but all I actually did was sit on the couch and get high—while the TV watched me. It was a very, very hard time."

A year after his dismissal, in July 1991, Adler filed a lawsuit against his former Guns N' Roses bandmates, contending that he was fired because the opiate-blocking drug he had been taking to aid his detox interfered with his concentration. He also alleged that the contract he had been made to sign took away his financial interest in the band, stating, "I was told that every time I did heroin, the band would fine me $2,000. ... What these contracts actually said was that the band were paying me $2,000 to leave. They were taking my royalties, all my writing credits. They didn't like me any more and just wanted me gone." The case was settled out of court in 1993; Adler received a back-payment check of $2,250,000 and was granted 15% of the royalties for everything he recorded prior to his departure.

On May 5, 1995, Adler was arrested at his home in Calabasas on a felony charge of heroin possession.

In 1996, Adler suffered a stroke and was briefly comatose after taking a particularly potent speedball—a cocktail of heroin and cocaine used intravenously—which caused a temporary paralysis of the left side of his face, resulting in a speech impediment. The following year, he pleaded no contest to disturbing the peace in relation to a domestic violence charge involving a woman with whom he had been living; he was sentenced to four days in jail, three years' probation, and mandatory drug counseling.

In June 1998, Adler joined the newly reformed hard rock band BulletBoys, along with future Guns N' Roses guitarist DJ Ashba. The group recorded an album and announced a US summer tour with Faster Pussycat, Bang Tango and Enuff Z'nuff. However, Adler's return to music was cut short the following September, when he pleaded no contest to two counts of battery stemming from attacks on two other women in separate domestic violence incidents. He was sentenced to a 150-day term in prison and three years' probation, with the condition of undergoing a year of domestic violence counseling and a ban on using illegal drugs.

=== 2003–2011: Adler's Appetite and reality TV ===
In 2003, Adler formed the band Suki Jones, later renamed Adler's Appetite, with singer Jizzy Pearl, former Slash's Snakepit guitarist Keri Kelli, Faster Pussycat guitarist Brent Muscat, and former Ratt bassist Robbie Crane. With an ever-changing line-up due to members' previous commitments, the band toured the US and Europe throughout 2003 and 2004, playing mostly songs off Guns N' Roses' debut album Appetite for Destruction, as well as material by Aerosmith, Led Zeppelin, and Queen. In September 2003, Adler's Appetite performed a show at the Key Club in Hollywood, where they were joined on stage by Adler's former Guns N' Roses bandmates Slash and Izzy Stradlin, for renditions of "Mr. Brownstone", "Paradise City", and "Knockin' on Heaven's Door".

In January 2005, Adler's Appetite—minus Brent Muscat, who had departed the band—released through their official website a self-titled EP, which featured four original songs and the covers "Hollywood" by Thin Lizzy and "Draw the Line" by Aerosmith. The release was followed by a tour of the US, Europe, Japan, and Argentina. Later that year, the band announced plans to release a full-length album through Shrapnel Records, but it failed to materialize. In July 2007, the group played another show at the Key Club, as part of their tour celebrating the 20th anniversary of Appetite for Destruction, during which they were joined on stage by former Guns N' Roses members Izzy Stradlin and Duff McKagan. Although Slash was also in attendance, he did not join the band on stage, stating that he did not want to encourage the notion of a Guns N' Roses reunion.

In 2008, Adler participated in the second season of the reality TV show Celebrity Rehab with Dr. Drew. The show's resident medical expert, Drew Pinsky, regarded Adler as the "problem child" of the group; he described his behavior as "suicidal" and revealed that Adler had to be committed to a psychiatric hospital for two weeks prior to entering rehab. Adler also participated in the first season of the Celebrity Rehab spin-off Sober House. During the show's filming in July, an intoxicated Adler became so aggressive towards his cast mates that he was arrested at the Sober House premises. He was convicted of being under the influence of a controlled substance and sentenced to community service. The following January, he was arrested again for failure to complete his community service in the time frame stipulated by the judge.

In 2010, Adler collaborated with his former Guns N' Roses bandmate Slash on the latter's self-titled debut solo album, which was released in April. He appeared on the track "Baby Can't Drive", along with Red Hot Chili Peppers bassist Flea, Alice Cooper, and Nicole Scherzinger. The song was featured on an expanded edition of the album released by Classic Rock. The following July, Adler's Appetite—consisting of Adler, singer Rick Stitch, guitarists Michael Thomas and Alex Grossi, and bassist Chip Z'nuff—released the single "Alive", in conjunction with the release of Adler's autobiography My Appetite for Destruction: Sex, and Drugs, and Guns N' Roses. In December, the band released two more singles, entitled "Stardog" and "Fading". In 2011, following another relapse, Adler participated in the fifth season of Celebrity Rehab with Dr. Drew. Later that year he announced the end of Adler's Appetite, wanting to launch a new, more profitable musical project.

=== 2012–2017: Adler and guest appearance with Guns N' Roses ===
In 2012, Adler formed a new band, simply called Adler, with guitarist Lonny Paul, who had been a member of Adler's Appetite prior to the breakup, and singer-guitarist Jacob Bunton of Lynam and formerly of Mars Electric, with the lineup later rounded out by former L.A. Guns member Johnny Martin on bass. Adler stated, "I love the music that we're creating! I haven't been this excited about my band since the Guns N' Roses days." The band recorded their debut album in Los Angeles with producers Jeff Pilson and Jay Ruston. Titled Back from the Dead, the album features guest appearances from Slash and John 5, and was released on November 26, 2012, via New Ocean Media. The album's release was preceded by the single "The One That You Hated", which was released on April 10 via iTunes.

On April 14, 2012, Adler was inducted into the Rock and Roll Hall of Fame as a member of the classic lineup of Guns N' Roses. He headlined the induction ceremony with fellow inductees Slash, Duff McKagan, and Matt Sorum, as well as former member Gilby Clarke and Slash's collaborator Myles Kennedy. Adler stated that being inducted was "an honor and a dream come true."

In late October and early November 2012, Adler played on the Kiss Kruise, which sailed from Florida to the Bahamas. These shows marked the band's first-ever live performances. The following year, Adler's scheduled U.S. tour was postponed when Adler checked into a rehab facility to "continue working on his sobriety." Adler returned to touring in 2015 after a two-year hiatus.

On the July 6, 2016 stop of the Not in This Lifetime... Tour in Cincinnati, Ohio, Adler joined Guns N' Roses for performances of "Out Ta Get Me" and "My Michelle", which marked his first appearance with the band since 1990. He made other guest appearances during shows in Nashville, Los Angeles, and Buenos Aires. He was also rumored to take part in the band's surprise April 1 show at the Troubadour, but had back surgery which forced him to pull out.

In early 2017, he confirmed that due to low attendance at their live performances, the Adler project has been abandoned.

=== 2019–present: solo career ===
On May 3, 2019, Steven played his first show with his new band of a complete new lineup comprising Adler's Appetite guitarist Michael Thomas, vocalist Ari Kamin, guitarist Alistair James and bassist Tanya O'Callaghan. The first lineup change occurred in 2021, when Todd Kerns was brought in to replace O'Callaghan. She previously left to join Whitesnake. As of 2023 the band comprises Adler, Thomas, Kamin, James and bassist Cristian Sturba, and is touring the United States, performing songs of Adler's early years with Guns N' Roses, as well as songs off of Back from the Dead.

== Discography ==
=== with Guns N' Roses ===
Studio albums:

- Appetite for Destruction (1987)
- G N' R Lies (1988)

Singles:

- Civil War (1990)

=== with Adler's Appetite ===
- Adler's Appetite (2005)
- Sadder Days (2007)
- Alive (2010)

=== with Adler ===
Studio albums

- Back from the Dead (2012)

=== Session work ===
With Slash

- Slash (2010; "Baby Can't Drive")

== Citations ==
- Adler, Deanna; Spagnola, Lawrence J. (2011). Sweet Child of Mine: A Memoir of Steven Adler. Harper Paperbacks. ISBN 978-0-06-191713-4.
- Adler, Steven; Spagnola, Lawrence J. (2010). My Appetite for Destruction: Sex, and Drugs, and Guns N' Roses. It Books. ISBN 978-0-06-191711-0.
- Berelian, Essi (2005). The Rough Guide to Heavy Metal. Rough Guides. ISBN 978-1-84353-415-0.
- Slash; Bozza, Anthony (2007). Slash. HarperCollins. ISBN 978-0-00-725777-5.
- Stenning, Paul (2005). The Band That Time Forgot: The Complete Unauthorised Biography of Guns N' Roses. Chrome Dreams. ISBN 978-1-84240-314-3.
- Sugerman, Danny (1991). Appetite for Destruction: The Days of Guns N' Roses. St. Martin's Press. ISBN 978-0-312-07634-4.
- Wall, Mick (1992). Guns N' Roses: The Most Dangerous Band in the World. Hyperion. ISBN 978-1-56282-951-3.
