= I Wanna Be Your Man (disambiguation) =

"I Wanna Be Your Man" is a 1963 Lennon–McCartney song, recorded separately by the Beatles and the Rolling Stones.

I Wanna Be Your Man may also refer to:

- I Wanna Be Your Man (EP), a 1990 EP by L.A. Guns
- "I Wanna Be Your Man" (Ironik song)
- "I Wanna Be Your Man", a song by Endeverafter from Kiss or Kill

== See also ==
- "I Want to Be Your Man", a 1987 song by Roger Troutman
