= Adler (band) =

American rock band

- Origin: Los Angeles, California, U.S.
- Genres: Hard rock
- Years active: 2012–2017
- Label: New Ocean Media
- Spinoff of: Adler's Appetite
- Past members: Steven Adler; Jacob Bunton; Johnny Martin; Lonny Paul

Adler was an American hard rock supergroup from Los Angeles, California, formed in 2012 by former Guns N' Roses drummer Steven Adler. The band was formed following the dissolution of Adler's previous band, Adler's Appetite, and consisted of Adler along with current Lynam and former Mars Electric vocalist/guitarist Jacob Bunton, guitarist Lonny Paul (now also of Lynam), and L.A. Guns bassist Johnny Martin.

== History ==
After the breakup of his band Adler's Appetite in late 2011, original Guns N' Roses drummer Steven Adler was looking forward to forming a new group. The band's album, Back from the Dead, was released November 26, 2012, via New Ocean Media. During an interview, Jacob Bunton said that their producer Jeff Pilson "is like a 5th member of the band, he's brought out so much and help channel the songs", and "he brings so much to the table as a producer, a member and a bassist, he has the same passion that he has been performing into the studio". Steven Adler has said "My goal is to take this band into the Rock and Roll Hall of Fame in 25 years, I want to be a part of a team, like the Rolling Stones, Aerosmith, or Rush. These guys are buddies and love making music together, it's cool to be part of a gang".

An American tour was initiated early in 2013, with a European tour scheduled for the fall of that year. However, these plans were curtailed when Steven Adler entered rehabilitation in May 2013, and the band entered hiatus. The band returned to active service in 2015, undertaking a US tour in the summer of that year. In 2016, the band performed at the M3 and the Monsters of Rock West Coast Cruise. These proved to be the band's last performances however, as in February 2017 Steven Adler revealed that the band was over as a result of his disinterest in performing concerts with low attendances. In 2019, Steven started performing in his current solo incarnation, featuring an all new lineup of musicians.

== Personnel ==
- Steven Adler – drums, percussion
- Jacob Bunton – lead vocals, guitars, mandolin, keyboards, piano
- Johnny Martin – bass, vocals
- Lonny Paul – guitars, vocals

== Discography ==
- Back from the Dead (2012)
