= Rock the Bayou =

Rock festival

Coordinates: 29.6755°N 95.4075°W

Rock The Bayou was a four-day rock festival celebrating the 1980s rock scene. From Houston, Texas the inaugural show took place from Labor Day weekend, August 29–September 1, 2008 on the 100-acre (0.40 km^{2}) former location of Houston's AstroWorld theme park and featured a variety of musical acts from genres such as hard rock, heavy metal, glam metal, and classic rock.

The festival had more than 100 bands confirmed, contrary to initial estimates that 40 bands would be playing.

== 2008 main stage lineup ==
Over 100 bands appeared on four stages during the 4 days of Rock the Bayou. The headliners for the 2008 Rock the Bayou Concert were Queensrÿche, Sammy Hagar, Alice Cooper, and Bret Michaels. Besides the main stage, there were a second and third stage of other bands.

The following bands have performed for the main stage from the Rock the Bayou website:

Friday, August 29 — “Day 1”

- Queensrÿche
- Ratt
- Skid Row
- Y & T
- Lynch Mob
- Faster Pussycat
- Gilby Clarke
- Jetboy
- The Barfuss Boys

Saturday, August 30 — “Day 2”

- Sammy Hagar
- Lita Ford
- Dokken
- Great White
- Enuff Z'Nuff
- Bullet Boys with Steven Adler
- Britny Fox
- Little Caesar

Sunday, August 31 — “Day 3”

- Alice Cooper
- Warrant
- Yngwie Malmsteen
- Slaughter
- L.A. Guns
- Dangerous Toys
- Lillian Axe
- Black 'N Blue
- Seven Story Drop

Monday, September 1 — Day 4

- Bret Michaels from Poison
- Gypsy Pistoleros
- Twisted Sister
- Jackyl
- KiX
- Firehouse
- Pretty Boy Floyd
- Bang Tango
- Broken Teeth
