= Road Crew (band) =

American band

- Origin: Los Angeles, California, U.S.
- Years active: 1984, 1991
- Past members: Steven Adler; Slash; Duff McKagan; Davy Vain; Ashley Mitchell; Jamie Scott; Shawn Rorie

Road Crew was an American garage band from Los Angeles, formed in late 1983. The band consisted of future Guns N' Roses members Slash, Steven Adler and Duff McKagan. They auditioned a number of singers while writing material, but disbanded the same year with no releases.

Following his firing from Guns N' Roses in 1990, Adler joined Vain in 1991, with the band renaming themselves Road Crew the same year. The new lineup consisted of former members of California glam rockers Vain: Davy Vain, Ashley Mitchell, Jamie Scott, and Shawn Rorie. They recorded an album and gained some label attention. However, due to Adler's drug abuse, Road Crew disbanded once more without releasing the album.

== History ==
=== Early years, formation and disbanding (1984) ===
Following the breakup of his previous group Tidus Sloan, Slash found himself without a band. His childhood friend Steven Adler, who had learned to play drums suggested that they form a band together. After trying out for London they decided to form their own band, taking out an ad in The Recycler for a bass player before auditioning for singers. Though they received a few calls, only Duff McKagan wanted to meet with them.

McKagan had moved from Seattle to Los Angeles at this point having already been a member of the bands The Fartz, Fastbacks and 10 Minute Warning while he also played one show drumming for Johnny Thunders. Shortly after his move, he answered the ad and met with Slash and Adler at Canter's Deli. Describing McKagan's appearance upon meeting him at Canter's, Slash said that he was "this bone-skinny six-foot-plus guy, with short spiked blonde hair [who] rolled in wearing a Sid Vicious-style chain and padlock around his neck, combat boots, and a red-and-black leather trench coat in spite of the seventy-five-degree weather. No one had predicted that." Soon after meeting, the trio formed a group together, named Road Crew (after the Motörhead song "(We Are) The Road Crew") and began auditioning singers.

They auditioned a number of singers, including Ron Reyes who was briefly the singer for Black Flag, while working on material which included the main riff to what would become "Rocket Queen" (though Adler stated in a later interview stated that no Road Crew material was used until the recording of the Use Your Illusion albums). Despite there being a good chemistry between the trio, Slash disbanded the group citing not being able to find a singer as well as Adler's constant partying and lack of work ethic compared to himself and McKagan.

Slash would go on to play with Black Sheep and audition for Poison, while both Slash and Adler became members of Hollywood Rose. Hollywood Rose would break-up and reform (without Slash and Adler) eventually becoming Guns N' Roses. Slash, McKagan and Adler would replace Guns N' Roses members Tracii Guns, Ole Beich and Rob Gardner respectively. Along with Axl Rose and Izzy Stradlin, the lineup would be known as the "classic lineup" of Guns N' Roses.

=== Second incarnation (1991) ===
After being fired from Guns N' Roses in 1990, Adler would join the heavy metal group Vain. The band, who had by then recorded two albums, and whose lineup consisted at that time of singer Davy Vain, guitarists Jamie Scott and bassist Ashley Mitchell, as well as guitarist Shawn Rorie who had joined after the second album was completed, renamed themselves Road Crew and proceeded to record an album. However, despite gaining attention from a record label, the group disbanded due to Adler's drug problems at the time. 6 of the songs were later released on three of Vain's albums: "Move On It", "Fade" and "Enough Rope". Adler is credited as drummer on the songs "Cindy" and "Worship You" on 2011's "Enough Rope".

Following the breakup, Adler briefly joined BulletBoys, before forming the group Suki Jones, which eventually became Adler's Appetite, performing on and off with the band since 2003. Following the breakup of Adler's Appetite, he formed the eponymous group Adler in 2011. On April 14, 2012, Slash, McKagan and Adler were inducted into the Rock and Roll Hall of Fame as members of the classic lineup of Guns N' Roses. They headlined the induction ceremony with fellow inductee Matt Sorum, as well as former member Gilby Clarke and Alter Bridge singer Myles Kennedy.

== Members ==
First incarnation

- Steven Adler – drums (1984)
- Slash – guitar (1984)
- Duff McKagan – bass (1984)

Second incarnation

- Steven Adler – drums (1991)
- Davy Vain – vocals (1991)
- Ashley Mitchell – bass (1991)
- Jamie Scott – guitar (1991)
- Shawn Rorie – guitar (1991)
