= Steady Ground =

American alternative rock band

- Origin: Santa Ana, California, United States
- Genres: Alternative rock
- Years active: 2003–2007
- Label: Band-Aid on a Bullet
- Past members: Ron Welty; George Squiers; Aaron Pointon; Kyle Rogan; Jared Woods; Josh Anders; Rick Stitch; Benjamin Hatch
- Website: Steadyground.com

Steady Ground was an American alternative rock group best known for having former the Offspring drummer Ron Welty in its lineup.

On February 26, 2006, Steady Ground released three demos on Myspace, entitled "Everyone's Emotional", "I Can't Contain Myself", and "You Better Close Your Eyes." In 2007, the band released the studio album Jettison, and in the same year they broke up.

== Members ==
Final lineup

- George Squiers – guitars (2003–2007)
- Jared Woods – guitars (2003–2007)
- Kyle Rogan – bass (2003–2007)
- Ron Welty – drums (2003–2007)
- Benjamin Hatch – vocals (2007)

Former members

- Aaron Pointon – vocals (2003–2004)
- Josh Anders – vocals (2004–2006)
- Rick Stitch – vocals (2006–2007)

== Discography ==
=== Studio albums ===
| Year | Album details |
|---|---|
| 2007 | Jettison: Label: Band-Aid on a Bullet; Formats: CD |
