= Endeverafter =

American heavy metal band

EndeverafteR
- Origin: Sacramento, California
- Genres: Glam metal, heavy metal
- Years active: 2004–2012
- Labels: Razor & Tie, Epic Records
- Past members: Michael Grant; Kristan Mallory; Tommi Andrews; Austin SinClaire; Eric Humbert
- Website: Official MySpace

Endeverafter (stylized as EndeverafteR) was an American heavy metal band from Sacramento, California.

== History ==
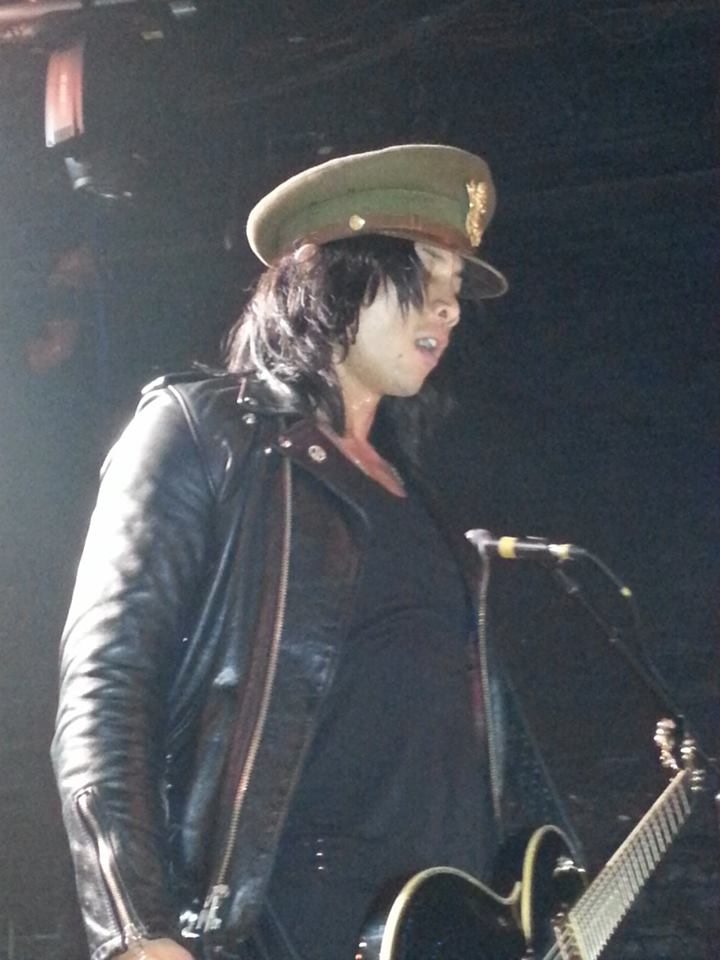
Band founder Michael Grant

Endeverafter was formed in 2004 by lead singer and guitarist Michael Grant. After the rest of the band was assembled, they released their debut EP in 2005 and played regular shows in their hometown, featuring confetti and strobe lights. In 2006 the group signed with Epic Records and recorded their debut album, From the Ashes of Sin, with producer Stacy Jones. Drummer Eric Humbert, formerly of The Red Hot Valentines, joined the group in early 2006, replacing Austin SinClaire. They toured in mid-2006 with Cinderella and Poison, also opened a couple of shows for Kiss in Japan, bringing their music nationwide while recording their album. After several label changes at Sony/Epic and numerous release date changes, Endeverafter finally released their full-length debut album Kiss or Kill on Indie label Razor & Tie in October 2007. Later that year, the single "I Wanna Be Your Man" hit #25 on the U.S. Billboard Mainstream Rock Tracks chart.

In late 2007 they toured with Trapt and Fuel. The band's song "No More Words", which appears on the album WWE The Music, Vol. 8 was used as Jeff Hardy's entrance theme and was released in March 2008. At the end of January 2008 Endeverafter performed a show at Motley Cruise, a four-day cruise in the Caribbean (Miami, Key West and Cozumel, MX) with Vince Neil, Skid Row, Slaughter, Ratt, Lynam and toured with Roadrunner Records artist Airbourne through spring 2008. They did a one-off interactive show on DeepRockDrive.com on May 23, 2008. They also released their second single, "Baby, Baby, Baby" to radio stations in late May, which peaked at #38 on the Mainstream Rock charts. They appeared on the "Road to Destruction" tour supporting Saving Abel through June 2008. On June 27, 2008, Endeverafter opened up for Alter Bridge and Shinedown in El Paso, Texas, at the KLAQ Downtown St. Festival.

Their song "I Wanna Be Your Man" is featured as a downloadable track in Rock Band 2. In 2009 the song also appeared in episode 1 of the 8th season of Scrubs, titled "My Jerks".

In November 2010 they released a new song titled "Barrel of a Gun" on MySpace and Facebook. However, as of March 2012 Endeverafter has split up according to Michael Grant's Facebook. As of January 2013 Michael Grant has joined LA Guns, replacing Frank Wilsey who left a month after joining. As of March 2018 Michael Grant has departed from L.A. Guns to pursue other interests including his solo project "Michael Grant and the Assassins" although later Michael Grant revealed he was fired .

=== ShipRocked ===
Endeverafter joined a variety of other hard rock acts on the November 2009 cruise entitled "ShipRocked". This ended up being the final show for the band before breaking up due to personal differences.

== Band members ==
- Michael Grant - lead vocals, lead guitar (2004–2012)
- Kristan Mallory - rhythm guitar, backing vocals (2004–2012)
- Tommi Andrews (The Artist Formerly Known As Drew Sims) - bass, backing vocals (2004–2012)
- Austin SinClaire - drums (2004–2006)
- Eric Humbert - drums (2006–2012)

== Discography ==
=== Studio albums ===
- Kiss or Kill (Razor & Tie, 2007)

=== Extended plays ===
- Blood on the Stage EP (2005)

=== Unreleased albums ===
- From the Ashes of Sin (Epic Records, 2007) - Not released

=== Other appearances ===
- "No More Words", from the album WWE The Music, Vol. 8

=== Singles ===
Year	Song	Peak chart positions	Album
Year	Song	US Main.	Album
2007	"I Wanna Be Your Man"	25	Kiss or Kill
2007	"Baby Baby Baby"	38	Kiss or Kill
"—" denotes a release that did not chart.
