= Angry Salad (album) =

Studio album by Angry Salad
- Released: May 25, 1999
- Genre: Pop rock Rock
- Label: Blackbird / Atlantic Records

Angry Salad chronology
Bizarre Gardening Accident (1997)	Angry Salad (1999)

Angry Salad is the third album released by the band Angry Salad. It was released in 1999 by Blackbird Records, a division of Atlantic Records. and is the name of their demo album.

In a review for Lollipop Magazine, Scott Hefflon wrote: "With lyrics like "Freedom’s just another word for watching TV"... more pop culture references than you can shake a really, really big stick at, and a cover of “99 Red Balloons,” you know you’ve got something here."

== Track listing ==
1. "The Milkshake Song" (3:46)
2. "How Does It Feel To Kill?" (3:59)
3. "Rico" (4:24)
4. "Stretch Armstrong" (3:35)
5. "99 Red Balloons" (2:55)
6. "Saturday Girl" (4:24)
7. "Empty Radio" (4:33)
8. "Scared Of Highways" (3:39)
9. "Coming To Grips" (3:45)
10. "Red Cloud" (6:04)

== Personnel ==
- Bob Whelan: Guitar and Vocals
- Alex Grossi: Guitar
- Brian Vesco: Bass
- Hale Pulsifer: Drums
