= Life in Reverse =

Studio album by Lynam
- Released: 2004
- Genre: Rock
- Label: EMG

Lynam chronology
| Bling! Bling! (2003) | Life in Reverse (2004) | Slave to the Machine (2006) |

Life In Reverse is the third studio album released by Alabama rock group Lynam. The tracks "Tanis," "Letting Go" and "By Your Side" were re-released on the band's fourth album, Slave to the Machine.

== Track listing ==
| No. | Title | Length |
|---|---|---|
| 1. | "Loved By Everyone" | 02:33 |
| 2. | "Tanis" | 03:37 |
| 3. | "Another Pretty Face" | 03:54 |
| 4. | "Everybody's Girl" | 02:57 |
| 5. | "In Case You Didn't Know" | 03:36 |
| 6. | "By Your Side" | 03:08 |
| 7. | "Letting Go" | 04:43 |
| 8. | "Dead Again" | 02:59 |
| 9. | "Descend" | 05:05 |
| 10. | "Last Chance" | 03:33 |
| Total length: | | 36:05 |
