= Slave to the Machine =

Studio album by Lynam
- Released: June 20, 2006
- Genre: Hard rock, glam rock
- Length: 41:28
- Label: DRT Entertainment / Universal Records

Lynam chronology
Life in Reverse (2004)	Slave to the Machine (2006)

Slave to the Machine is the fourth album by American rock band Lynam and the first full-length album of the band released on a major label. Released in 2006, this album peaked at #21 on Billboard's Top Independent Albums chart and #19 on its Top Heatseekers chart. Several of the tracks on this album can also be found on Lynam's earlier releases. "Losing Venus" and "Never Fade Away" were both on Bling! Bling! while "Tanis," "Letting Go," and "By Your Side" also appeared on Life in Reverse.

== Track listing ==
No.	Title	Length
1.	"It's All In Your Head"	03:42
2.	"Better"	03:09
3.	"Tanis (Change Your Mind)"	03:39
4.	"Slave to the Machine"	03:36
5.	"Losing Venus"	04:38
6.	"By Your Side"	03:02
7.	"What Is This?"	02:38
8.	"Sister Babylon"	03:10
9.	"Giving Up On Rock 'N' Roll"	03:33
10.	"Letting Go"	04:41
11.	"Never Fade Away"	02:47
12.	"I Hate My Generation"	02:53
Total length:		41:28
