= The Guinea Pig EP =

EP by Angry Salad
- Released: Fall 1993
- Genre: Pop rock Rock
- Length: 29:45
- Label: Breaking World Records

Angry Salad chronology
The Guinea Pig EP (1993)	Bizarre Gardening Accident (1997)

The Guinea Pig EP is the first album released by the band Angry Salad. It was released in 1993 by Breaking World Records.

== Track listing ==
1. "Did I Hurt You?"
2. "Given Up"
3. "I Want You Back"
4. "My Town"
5. "So Little"
6. "Dance"
7. "Rico"

== Personnel ==
- Bob Whelan: Guitar and Vocals
- Matt Foran: Bass Guitar and Backing Vocals
- Chris Davis: Guitar and Backing Vocals
- Hale Pulsifer: Drums
