= Rocket Queen =

Song by Guns N' Roses

from the album Appetite for Destruction
- Released: July 21, 1987
- Recorded: 1987
- Genre: Hard rock
- Length: 6:13
- Label: Geffen
- Songwriters: Axl Rose; Slash; Duff McKagan
- Producer: Mike Clink

"Rocket Queen" is a song by American rock band Guns N' Roses, featured on their debut studio album, Appetite for Destruction (1987). The song incorporates moans from a woman, Adriana Smith, who was recorded having sexual intercourse with the band's singer, Axl Rose.

== Background ==
Slash stated in his autobiography that he and Duff McKagan wrote the main riff to "Rocket Queen" when they first got together in the short-lived band Road Crew with Steven Adler, prior to Slash and Adler joining Hollywood Rose.

According to frontman Axl Rose:

I wrote this song for this girl who was gonna have a band and she was gonna call it Rocket Queen. She kinda kept me alive for a while. The last part of the song is my message to this person, or anybody else who can get something out of it. It's like there's hope and a friendship note at the end of the song. For that song there was also something I tried to work out with various people—a recorded sex act. It was somewhat spontaneous but premeditated; something I wanted to put on the record.

A credit in the booklet for Appetite for Destruction reads "Barbi (Rocket Queen) Von Greif", implying that she was "this girl" Rose mentions in the quote. Slash states that, while Von Greif was only 18 at the time, she had a notorious reputation and was "a queen of the underground scene back then. She'd eventually become a madam, but Axl was infatuated with her at the time." She was also mentioned in the acknowledgments section of L.A. Guns' self-titled debut album.

In an October 1991 interview in Guitar Player magazine, John Frusciante of the Red Hot Chili Peppers said Axl Rose told the Chili Peppers that Guns N' Roses had the Chili Peppers in mind when they recorded "Rocket Queen".

== Sexual recording ==
A woman named Adriana Smith, Guns N' Roses groupie and stripper at the time, had been with drummer Steven Adler for around a year. Smith later claimed in a TV interview that, after Adler insisted that she was not his girlfriend, she went to the mixing sessions at Mediasound Studios in New York City. Rose and Slash were there. Rose propositioned Smith that they have sex in a vocal booth so that the sounds that Smith made could be recorded and put over the bridge of the song. Smith replied that she would do it, "For the band, and a bottle of Jack Daniel's".

Steve Thompson, an engineer of the album, said:

Axl wanted some pornographic sounds on "Rocket Queen", so he brought a girl in and they had sex in the studio. We wound up recording about 30 minutes of sex noises. If you listen to the break on "Rocket Queen" it's in there.

Another engineer, Michael Barbiero, did not want to record the sex session, so he set up the microphones and left the task to his assistant, Vic Deyglio. Deyglio said the studio was "like a Ron Jeremy set", and he even had to enter the booth to adjust a microphone which Rose and Smith had crashed into. The Appetite for Destruction liner notes jokingly acknowledge Deyglio's contribution by crediting him as "Victor 'the fucking engineer' Deglio".

It was later stated in the music magazine Classic Rock, as well as Rolling Stone, that the person who had been recorded performing sex noises on the song was indeed Adriana Smith, an on-off girlfriend of Adler. She also allegedly had an intimate relationship with Rose. Smith revealed in an interview that Adler "freaked out" when he found out about the recorded sex session, and she spent some years using alcohol and drugs "because I had this extreme shame and guilt and stuff."

Smith also later said in The Girls Behind Guns N' Roses:

Somehow I became the Rocket Queen. And I have never, I have never, said, "I'm the Rocket Queen." It's just not me. The real Rocket Queen is Barbi.

However, further revelations could indicate that Smith and Rose have not been the only people recorded for the song. Mike Clink, longtime producer of the band, said: "The guys were taking turns fucking this girl in the studio. Those are actual sounds of sex, captured live on tape." Furthermore, a former Geffen employee claimed that Rose had sex several times with two or three girls on tape, unhappy with the results.

== Structure ==
The song contains two separate, distinct phases joined by a bridge. The first of these is in a format of verse, chorus, verse, chorus and is accompanied by lyrical bravado. There is also an instrumental section in the latter part of the first phase during which the sexual recording is also played.

The second phase of the song has no chorus and contains lyrics of affection and love in contrast to the bravado of the lyrics in the first phase of the song. The lyrics continue into the coda before the climax of the song (the conclusion of the song is not a fade out).

== Reception ==
In 2017, Paste ranked the song number four on their list of the 15 greatest Guns N' Roses songs, and in 2020, Kerrang ranked the song number three on their list of the 20 greatest Guns N' Roses songs.

== Live ==
- "Rocket Queen" made its live debut at The Troubadour in West Hollywood in September 1985 and has since been performed by every live incarnation of Guns N' Roses up to 2016.
- Adler would take a drum solo in the middle of the song while the band was supporting Appetite for Destruction in 1988, which expanded to include McKagan on an additional drum kit and Rose playing bass when the band opened four dates for The Rolling Stones in 1989 at Los Angeles Memorial Coliseum.
- In 1991, Rose stage dived into the audience during "Rocket Queen" to confiscate a camera that had been brought in by an attendee, and after failing to do so, canceled the remainder of the show in St. Louis, Missouri. The crowd vandalized the arena and surrounding property, leading to a riot and the eventual arrest of Rose.
- Slash has been regularly performing the song with Myles Kennedy while supporting his solo project since 2010.

== Personnel ==
- W. Axl Rose – lead vocals
- Slash – lead and slide guitar
- Izzy Stradlin – rhythm guitar
- Duff "Rose" McKagan – bass guitar
- Steven Adler – drums
- Adriana Smith – female moans (uncredited)

== Sources ==
- Slash; Bozza, Anthony (2007). Slash. Harper Entertainment. ISBN 978-0-00-725775-1.
- Davis, Stephen (2008). Watch You Bleed: The Saga of Guns N' Roses. Gotham Books. ISBN 978-1-59240-377-6.
