= Bizarre Gardening Accident =

Studio album by Angry Salad
- Released: Winter 1997
- Genre: Pop rock Rock
- Label: Breaking World Records

Angry Salad chronology
The Guinea Pig EP (1995)	Bizarre Gardening Accident (1997)	Angry Salad (1999)

Bizarre Gardening Accident is the second album released by the band Angry Salad. It was released in 1997 by Breaking World Records. The album's title is a reference to the rock mock documentary This Is Spinal Tap, in which the members of the fictional band Spinal Tap explain that one of their former drummers died in a "bizarre gardening accident".

== Track listing ==
1. "Empty Radio"
2. "Scared Of Highways"
3. "Stretch Armstrong"
4. "The Milkshake Song"
5. "Rico"
6. "99 Red Balloons"
7. "How Does It Feel To Kill?"
8. "Saturday Girl"
9. "Coming To Grips"
10. "Red Cloud"

== Personnel ==
- Bob Whelan: Guitar and vocals
- Alex Grossi: Guitar
- James Kinne: Bass and backing vocals (on Rio)
- Hale Pulsifer: Drums
- Steve Monayer: Bass (on all tracks except Rio)
- Jeff Bluestein: Piano, organ and backing vocals
- Seth Connolly: Additional guitar
- Rob Aquino: Additional guitar
