= White Trash Superstar =

Studio album by Lynam
- Released: 2002
- Genre: Rock
- Label: EMG

Lynam chronology
White Trash Superstar (2002)	Bling! Bling! (2003)

White Trash Superstar is the first studio album released by Alabama rock group Lynam. White Trash Superstar was re-released on iTunes in 2008. The song "The Party Starts Now" appeared on the soundtrack to the 2004 movie Catch That Kid.

== Track listing ==
No.	Title	Length
1.	"A"	00:04
2.	"The Best Thing"	03:53
3.	"Sex Pool"	03:44
4.	"The Party Starts Now"	03:08
5.	"Pet Vulcan"	03:28
6.	"Needle Park"	00:45
7.	"You'll Never Know"	03:16
8.	"Orenda"	00:46
9.	"Leave Me Alone"	03:05
10.	"Z"	00:32
Total length:		22:41
