= Blackout in the Red Room =

Studio album by Love/Hate
- Released: February 22, 1990
- Recorded: One on One Studios, North Hollywood, California; Ocean Way Recording, Hollywood, California
- Genre: Hard rock; glam metal
- Length: 40:44
- Label: Columbia
- Producer: Tom Werman, David Kahne

Love/Hate chronology
| Blackout in the Red Room (1990) | Wasted in America (1992) |

Singles from Blackout in the Red Room
- 1. "Blackout in the Red Room" Released: 1990; 2. "She's an Angel" Released: 1990; 3. "Why Do You Think They Call It Dope?" Released: 1990

Professional ratings
Review scores
| Source | Rating |
|---|---|
| Allmusic | 4/5 stars |

Blackout in the Red Room is the debut studio album by the American hard rock band Love/Hate. It was released on February 22, 1990, on Columbia Records. It reached #154 on the Billboard 200 album chart. The video for the single "Why Do You Think They Call It Dope?" received good rotation on MTV, chiefly on Headbangers Ball.

== Track listing ==
All tracks are written by Skid Rose

| No. | Title | Length |
|---|---|---|
| 1. | "Blackout in the Red Room" | 2:33 |
| 2. | "Rock Queen" | 2:21 |
| 3. | "Tumbleweed" | 3:31 |
| 4. | "Why Do You Think They Call It Dope?" | 3:57 |
| 5. | "Fuel to Run" | 3:18 |
| 6. | "One More Round" | 3:22 |
| 7. | "She's an Angel" | 4:08 |
| 8. | "Mary Jane" | 4:31 |
| 9. | "Straightjacket" | 3:14 |
| 10. | "Slutsy Tipsy" | 3:09 |
| 11. | "Slave Girl" | 3:51 |
| 12. | "Hell, Ca., Pop.4" | 2:44 |

== Personnel ==
- Jizzy Pearl – vocals
- Jon E. Love – guitar
- Skid (Rose) – bass, rhythm guitar on "Slave Girl", 12-string guitar on "She's an Angel"
- Joey Gold – drums

Additional musicians

- Greg Gottlieb – cellos on "Why Do You Think They Call It Dope?" and "Mary Jane"
- Paul Lewolt – bagpipes on "Why Do You Think They Call It Dope?"
- David Kahne – cellos on "She's an Angel"
