= My Jerks =

- Scrubs episode
- Episode no.: Season 8 Episode 1
- Directed by: Michael Spiller
- Written by: Angela Nissel
- Production code: 801
- Original air date: January 6, 2009

Guest appearances
- Courteney Cox as Dr. Taylor Maddox; Sam Lloyd as Ted Buckland; Travis Schuldt as Keith Dudemeister; Eliza Coupe as Dr. Denise Mahoney; Betsy Beutler as Katie Collins; Aziz Ansari as Ed Dhandapani; James Ritz as Mr. Hicks; Eric Artell as Rodney; Taran Killam as Jimmy; Aseem Batra as Josephine; Michael Spiller as Balloon Guy; Jack Grinnage as Marvell

Episode chronology
← Previous "My Princess"	Next → "My Last Words"
- Scrubs season 8

"My Jerks" is the first episode of the eighth season premiere and 151st overall episode of the American television sitcom Scrubs. The episode first aired on January 6, 2009, on ABC, following the show's departure from NBC. It was immediately followed by the second episode of the season. The episode was written by Angela Nissel and directed by Michael Spiller, who also has a small cameo appearance. This was the first Scrubs episode of the show to show moving footage over the credits, instead of its usual screenshots of scenes throughout the episode.

== Plot ==
J.D. notices the Janitor cleaning gum off a wall and comments, "that's new"; the Janitor, assuming J.D. had noticed his new watch, thinks he wants a compliment back and comments on J.D.'s newly grown "pubescent Miami Vice beard". J.D. then conducts rounds with his new interns and doesn't like any of them. He thinks Katie is a teacher's pet, Denise has a terrible bedside manner, and Ed is lazy. He welcomes the new Chief of Medicine for Sacred Heart, Dr. Taylor Maddox, and is surprised at how attractive and nice she is.

Later, during another session of rounds, J.D. leaves the interns alone in the ward to watch the patients and gives them specific instructions. When he returns, he finds that they allowed a patient to crash. He vows he is done teaching them and hands them over to Josephine. In the cafeteria, Dr. Cox tells J.D. that he was not too dissimilar from these new interns, and that it is his job to teach. He ends up giving the interns a second chance.

Meanwhile, Dr. Cox is upset that he is once again going to have to be "that guy" who always stands up to the Chief of Medicine. Nevertheless, when he notices that Maddox is keeping a patient in the hospital only because he has incredible insurance, he begins arguing with her.

After Keith calls Katie "Mini Elliot", Elliot obsesses that she is too self-involved. Carla tries to gently give her a reality check, but Elliot fails to see the signs that Keith is still hurt over their breakup. Ted shows her that he is still upset, and she realizes that she has indeed become too self-involved. Privately, she apologizes to Keith for breaking his heart.

After Dr. Maddox sees the Janitor trip up J.D. with his mop, she angrily fires him. When he fails to take her seriously and returns to work the next day, she marches him outside and takes his keys. At the end of the episode a new, friendly janitor introduces himself, to J.D.'s delight.

Dr. Kelso enjoys a muffin at Coffee Bucks and watches the hospital drama unfold. Ted tries to tell him off, but still does not have enough self-confidence to stand up to his hated ex-boss.

== Promotion ==
Bill Lawrence has stated that since switching to ABC, he and Scrubs have received a better level of promotion. This includes the introduction of webisodes of Scrubs on ABC.com and commercial promotion. ABC also released the first five minutes of the episode prematurely to promote the show's debut on the network.

== Cultural references ==
- In the episode's opening scene, J.D. approaches The Janitor and points at his "watch" and says "Huh, that's new." J.D.'s finger was placed so that it was pointing directly at the ABC logo on the original broadcast, in a reference to Scrubs' move from NBC to ABC.
- In the sequence that plays during the ending credits, J.D. mentions that Dr. Shalhoub wins everything during medical awards season, which is a jab at the number of awards won by Monk, in which Tony Shalhoub stars. Turk's comment that "the Nielsens certainly beg to differ" is a parallel to the show's performance with the Nielsen ratings.
- Courteney Cox becomes the second Friends alumnus to appear on Scrubs, after Matthew Perry's appearance in the Season 4 episode "My Unicorn".

== Trivia ==
- It is revealed that Turk is one-eighth Japanese.
- This one of the few times that Dr. Cox refers to J.D. by his real name, when he yells "Where the hell is Dorian?"
- Bill Lawrence directed the parts that Courteney Cox are in; they were shot months later than the other scenes, due to scheduling conflicts.

== Songs ==
The song that is played when Dr. Taylor Maddox enters is "I Wanna Be Your Man" by EndeverafteR.

== Reception ==
Seth Amitin gives a favorable review of the episode, saying "It's...unfair to point to an episode and ask it to represent the season, but...'My Jerks' is allowing us to do that. The episode is funny in ways that the show wasn't funny last year. It also mixes well with the dramatic while introducing a handful of new characters with relative ease. It's metonymical of Scrubs...Maybe Mr. Lawrence set up some lofty goals, but the first episode of the season follows through on [them]."

The Staten Island Advance deemed "My Jerks" a "hit" which balanced its comedy with more serious scenes well. Alan Sepinwall of The Star-Ledger concurred and felt that there "were moments of extreme silliness and moments of great pathos."
