= Alive (Adler's Appetite EP) =

EP by Adler's Appetite
- Released: April 2, 2012
- Recorded: 2010–2011
- Studios: NRG Recording Studios, North Hollywood, CA
- Genre: Hard rock
- Length: 16:49
- Label: Down Boys Records
- Producer: Fred Coury

Adler's Appetite chronology
Adler's Appetite (2005)	Alive (2012)

Singles from Alive
- 1. "Alive" Released: July 29, 2010; 2. "Fading" Released: December 22, 2010; 3. "Stardog" Released: December 22, 2010

Alive is an EP released by American hard rock band Adler's Appetite on April 2, 2012. It is a sequel to the band's first EP, the self-titled Adler's Appetite that was released in February 2005. In 2010 the band released their single “Alive" on iTunes from what was intended to be their upcoming album Alive that was slated to be released in 2011. Also a radio edit of the single was released on July 29, 2010 in conjunction with Steven Adler's tell-all autobiography, My Appetite for Destruction: Sex, and Drugs, and Guns N' Roses, and the band continued recording the album in fall 2011 in North Hollywood, California, and unlike the band's first EP which the band produced itself, Alive was produced by Cinderella band member and drummer Fred Coury, and was also recorded in a different studio as well. The album was mixed by Adler's long time friend Anthony Focx, and was released under the record label Down Boys Records. There is a digital as well as a limited-edition physical release, as Alive is available in both CD and digital music formats.

== Track listing ==
All tracks are written by Adler's Appetite and Fred Coury.

No.	Title	Writer(s)	Length
1.	"Alive"	Adler's Appetite	4:14
2.	"Stardog"	Adler's Appetite	4:03
3.	"Fading"	Adler's Appetite, Fred Coury	4:18
4.	"Alive (Instrumental)"	Adler's Appetite, Fred Coury	4:14
Total length:			16:49

== Personnel ==
- Steven Adler – drums
- Alex Grossi – guitar
- Rick Stitch – vocals
- Michael Thomas – guitars
- Chip Z'Nuff – bass

Technical personnel

- Fred Coury – production
- Anthony Focx – mixing

== Miscellaneous ==
- Alive comes with a few different art covers, the one that is red with a bald eagle on it and contains information about the song writing on the back of it, and has three tracks. The other one that contains three tracks has a black background with white and red artwork on the cover and has an Adler's Appetite online email address written on it. The longer version contains four tracks which one is the instrumental version of the song alive, and has the lincense info email address written on the back of it. Just like the band's first EP, the Alive EP is only sold though internet websites, and no version of it contains any booklet.
- Adler's Appetite's band members Rick Stitch, Chip Z'Nuff, and Alex Grossi had left the band before the release of the album.
- Unlike Adler's Appetite's first EP, all the tracks on Alive are completely written by Adler's Appetite and Fred Coury, and contain no cover songs.
- Alive (the version that features three tracks) is the album that Steven Adler has appeared on which has the fewest songs.
- Rick Stitch has said "The CD sounds like a more modern version of Guns N' Roses, and it definitely has everyone’s signature roots and influences on it".
- Steven Adler has said "The new songs are coming along great, after the response we got from performing Alive all summer, we are really excited to put out more original music and as much as we love doing all the old GN’R stuff, which of course we will continue to do, it will be nice to show the fans that there is so much more to this band than what people have seen”.
- Akex Grossi has said “We are really excited to be moving forward with original material, I think people are really going to like the direction we are going in".
