= Ron Welty =

American drummer

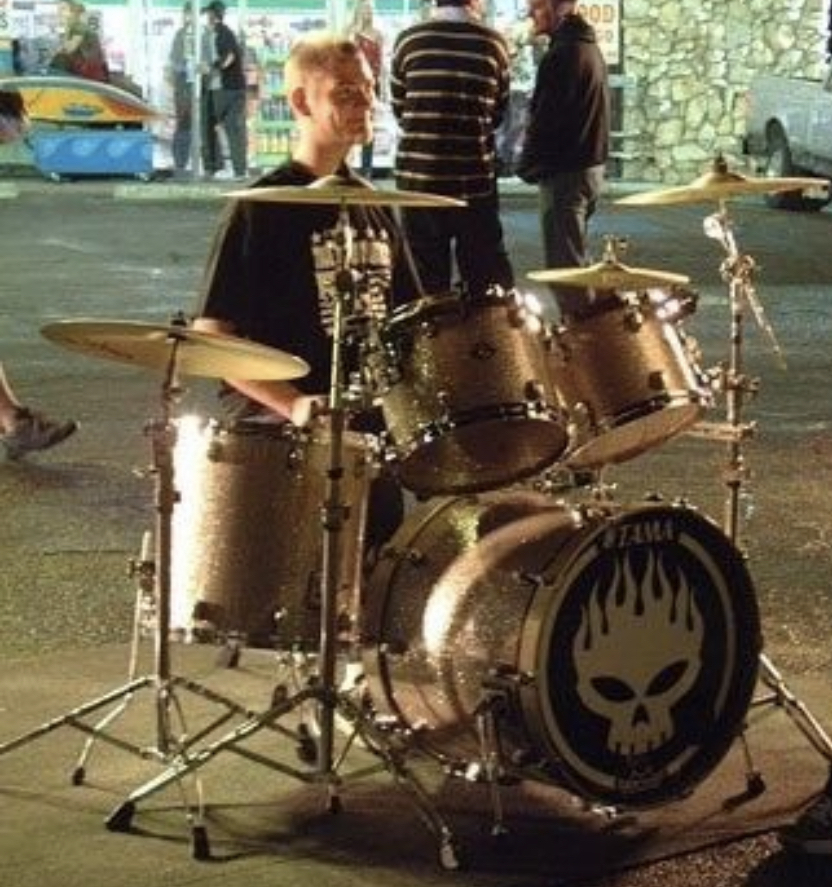
- Welty in 2001

Background information
- Born: Ronald Stephen Welty; February 1, 1971 (age 55)
- Origin: Long Beach, California, U.S.
- Genres: Punk rock; skate punk; alternative rock
- Occupation: Drummer
- Years active: 1986–2007
- Formerly of: The Offspring; Steady Ground

Ronald Stephen Welty (born February 1, 1971) is an American musician and the former drummer for the punk rock band the Offspring, where he was a member from 1987 to 2003 and served as the band's longest-serving drummer. After the Offspring, Welty formed Steady Ground.

== Career ==
Born and raised in Orange County, California, Welty started playing drums in eighth grade and cited Neil Peart and Lars Ulrich as early influences. Welty started playing the drums in 8th Grade, one of his first bands were called Fuck Quality X-Rays. He also played drums in a band called Spinning Fish. Ron Welty moved to Garden Grove for part of high school, and it was there that his older stepsister introduced him to Offspring frontman Dexter Holland.

=== The Offspring ===
In July 1987, 16-year-old Welty was brought in to the Offspring, to fill in for original drummer James Lilja. Welty knew other members of the Offspring and lived in the same neighborhood. Even though he was too young to get into many of the clubs where the band played, Welty convinced them to let him replace their previous drummer. During their first tour Welty's mother made frontman Dexter Holland sign papers saying he would take care of Ron for her while they were on tour.

Welty performed on the Offspring's first six studio albums: The Offspring, Ignition, Smash, Ixnay on the Hombre, Americana, and Conspiracy of One. On March 18, 2003, the band announced that Welty had left the band shortly before the sessions of Splinter. It was later revealed that Welty was "forced out of The Offspring without any prior notice." Of all the band's drummers, Welty's tenure of 16 years remains the longest.

In September 2020, Welty filed a lawsuit against the Offspring for unpaid royalties. Welty claimed he was owed millions more profits from the Offspring’s $35 million catalog sale and that former bandmate Dexter Holland tried to “erase” his contributions to the band's career by failing to pay him his rightful cut of the sale of the band’s rights to Round Hill Music in 2015, in addition to deleting his name from the liner notes on re-releases of albums he played on. The lawsuit was dismissed in 2023 with the presiding judge deciding the sale of the catalog followed industry practices.

=== Steady Ground ===
After the Offspring, Welty formed Steady Ground, in which he played drums and co-produced.

On February 26, 2006, Steady Ground released three demos on Myspace, entitled "Everyone's Emotional", "I Can't Contain Myself", and "You Better Close Your Eyes." In 2007, the band released the studio album Jettison, and in the same year they broke up.

== Discography ==
=== The Offspring ===
- The Offspring (1989)
- Ignition (1992)
- Smash (1994)
- Ixnay on the Hombre (1997)
- Americana (1998)
- Conspiracy of One (2000)

=== Steady Ground ===
- Jettison (2007)
