= Rick Stitch =

Canadian singer-songwriter

- Origin: London, Ontario, Canada
- Genres: Hard rock, heavy metal
- Occupations: Musician, artist, vocalist
- Instruments: Guitar, vocals, piano
- Years active: 1996–present
- Website: rickstitchofficial.com

Rick Stitch is a Canadian singer-songwriter who is the singer for Ladyjack Hotel Diablo and Adler's Appetite.

He has also played with First Born Unicorn, The Other Side of Morning and Steady Ground. Former Guns N' Roses guitarist Gilby Clarke was enlisted to produce Ladyjack's debut album.

== Early music career (1996–2007) ==
Rick Stitch started his musical career during the mid Nineties as a drummer with longtime high school friends Mark Pellizzer on guitar and Gary Rugala on bass. He left to join his older brother's (Chris Graham of The Framework) band as their new bassist.

It would be a year later that Stitch would become lead singer and songwriter of his newly formed band First Born Unicorn with Gary Rugala, David Christopher, Jon Fedorsen and Jaden. The band would perform through 2002–2004 in Toronto, Ontario.

After his relocation to Los Angeles, CA in early 2005, Stitch joined the band The Other Side of Morning as their new lead singer. Rick Stitch remained as singer through 2005 and in early 2006, he left the band and joined Steady Ground (featuring former The Offspring drummer Ron Welty) as their singer.

In 2007, Rick Stitch left the band to form, write, record and perform with what would become Ladyjack in early 2008.

== Ladyjack (2008–present) ==
In February 2008 Stitch formed Ladyjack with guitarist Robo. The duo would perform throughout 2008 at venues such as Canter's Kibitz Room, Rainbow Bar and Grill, and even busked on Hollywood Boulevard in search of bandmates.

In late 2009, bassist Corwin joined the band and a month later drummer Paul Tyler would take on the duties as the man behind the kit. In June 2009, guitarist Ryan Seelbach was added to the lineup.

== Adler's Appetite (2009–2011) ==
Following the departure for Sheldon Tarsha, Stitch joined Adler's Appetite as the group's new singer. The group announced more US dates as well as shows in Brazil and Argentina.

On 7 May the group announced dates for the second leg of their US tour.

== Hotel Diablo (2011–present) ==
He is currently in the band Hotel Diablo who put out their first album The Return To Psycho, California in 2012

== Solo (2002–present) ==
In 2002, Stitch began writing and performing his own music. He has continued to write and perform under his own name.

The song "Make It Right", written by Stitch, appears in the movie "Periphery" released in 2009.

== Discography ==
=== With Ladyjack ===
- Ladyjack (TBA)

=== With Adler's Appetite ===
- Alive

=== Singles ===
- Make It Right (2009) (solo)
