= Angry Salad =

Alternative rock band from Boston, MA

- Origin: Providence, Rhode Island, United States
- Genres: Alternative rock
- Years active: 1993–2001
- Label: Blackbird / Atlantic Records
- Members: Alex Grossi; Brian Holland; Hale Pulsifer; Bob Whelan
- Past members: Rob Aquino; Steve Monayer; Matt Foran; Rob Mull; Sean T. Cunningham; Chris Davis; James Kinne; Brian Vesco; Phil Surks; Ronnie Pudding; Harold Levey; Rory Billmeyer
- Website: The Official Website (Archived)

Angry Salad was an alternative rock band from Boston, Massachusetts. The band formed at Brown University in Providence, Rhode Island in 1993.

== Career ==
Before their major label deal, they had 1 full-length CD Bizarre Gardening Accident and 1 EP The Guinea Pig EP. Angry Salad had an enthusiastic New England following and filled local venues to capacity. They were known for their extensive crowd interaction.

In 1998 they secured a deal with Blackbird / Atlantic and re-released Bizarre Gardening Accident as a self-titled album in 1999. The band continued to tour for 2 years in support of the album, and then was in the process of recording demos for their next Atlantic release when AOL and Time Warner merged, and their Blackbird label (along with a number of other affiliate labels) was closed for financial reasons. Angry Salad was left with no label to release their recordings, and in lieu of standard Major Label contracts they lost rights to their name, music, and albums. Some members regrouped as Star64 and released a CD called You May Be Beautiful that contained the songs that Angry Salad had already begun recording.

Angry Salad were known in the industry as road warriors, and between the years of 1996–2000, they played an average of over 225 shows per year and spent as many as 300 days on the road each year.

In addition to the performing members of the band, the Angry Salad organization included Jim Dand (Tour Manager), Adam Lewis (Manager), and Adam Kamm (Sound Engineer - AKA "Mr. Furious").

Angry Salad's recording of the Bob Dylan song "My Back Pages" was used as the theme song for the short-lived WB Network series D.C. (starring Mark-Paul Gosselaar and Kristanna Loken)

Angry Salad's song "Stretch Armstrong" was used in pilot of the online sitcom series Family Practice.

== Albums/demos ==
- The Guinea Pig EP (1995, Breaking World Records)
- Bizarre Gardening Accident (1998, Breaking World Records)
- Angry Salad (1999, Atlantic Records)
- Angry Salad 1991 version (1991, A.Celly and Angry Salad)
