= Jizzy Pearl =

American singer (born 1958)

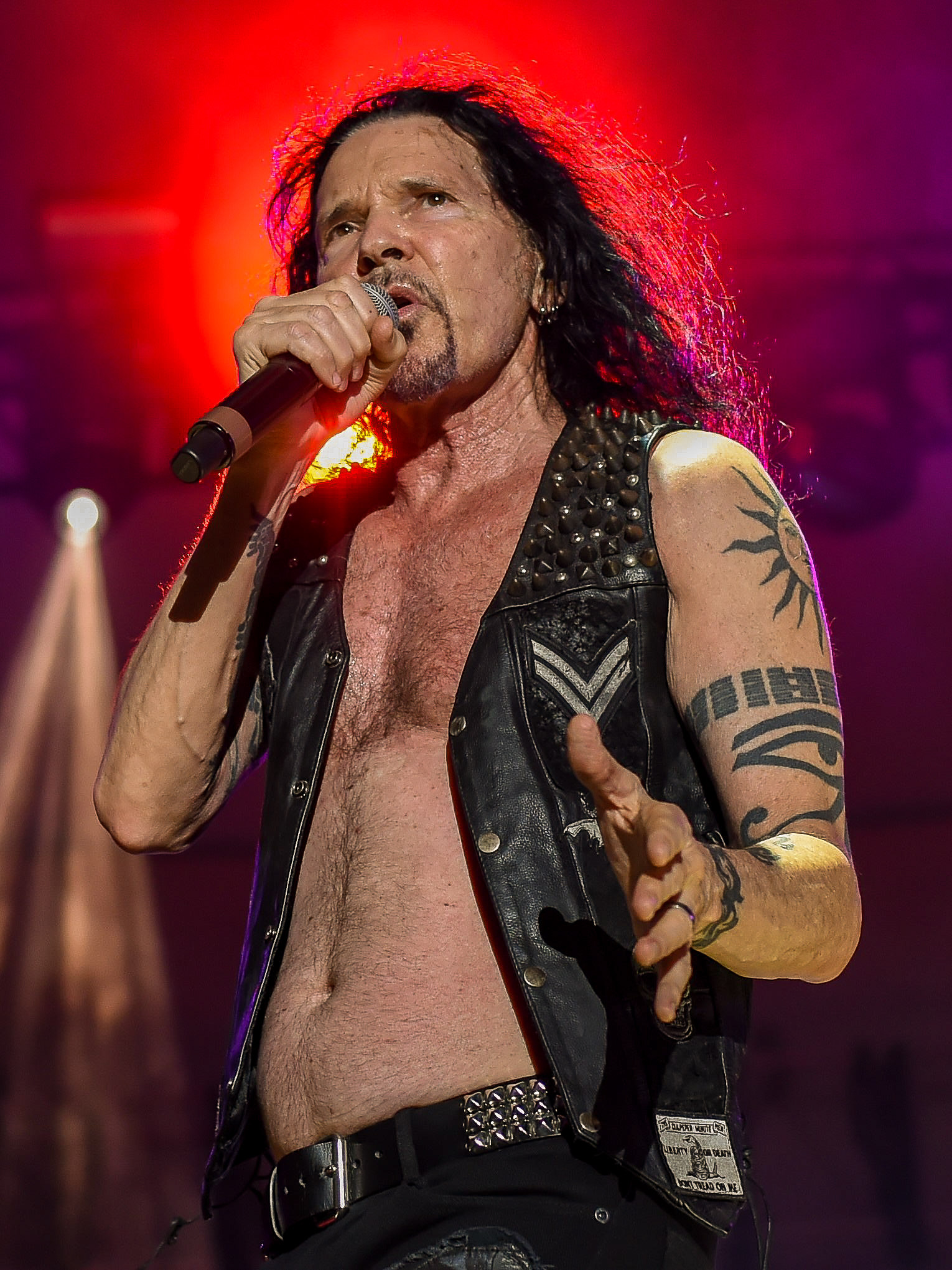
- Pearl on stage with Quiet Riot in 2024

Background information
- Born: James Wilkinson; March 17, 1958 (age 68); Chicago, Illinois, U.S.
- Genres: Hard rock, heavy metal, glam metal
- Occupation: Singer
- Years active: 1984–present

James Wilkinson (born March 17, 1958), better known professionally as Jizzy Pearl, is an American singer and songwriter. He first fronted the band Data Clan, which eventually became Love/Hate. Pearl has also sung for L.A. Guns, Ratt, Adler's Appetite, Quiet Riot and other, lesser known acts.

Pearl is known for, in the words of KNAC.com, his "gritty-sounding blues-influenced" vocals.

== Biography ==
In the late 1980s, Pearl sang for Love/Hate, which achieved notoriety for performances as the house band at the Whisky a Go Go in Hollywood. The group subsequently signed to Columbia Records.

In early 2007, Pearl announced he would reunite with Love/Hate after ten years, on February 24, 2007, at Club Vodka in Hollywood, California, to perform their classic record Blackout in the Red Room in its entirety.

In 2013, Pearl joined Quiet Riot, replacing then vocalist Scott Vokoun. The band decided to record a new album with Pearl that they set for release in early 2014.

That effort became Quiet Riot 10 (also alternatively known as just 10), which was the twelfth studio album by the heavy metal band and featured a mix of songs with Pearl as well as live tracks with founder vocalist Kevin DuBrow. The album came out on June 27, 2014. It has received mixed to positive reviews from publications such as KNAC.com and Music Enthusiast Magazine.

Pearl quit Quiet Riot at the end of 2016 to focus on his solo work, and was replaced by Seann Nichols, who was subsequently replaced by James Durbin in March 2017. Pearl re-joined in 2019 following Durbin's departure. On July 15, 2026, it was announced that he would once again leave the band upon completion of their summer tour. He was replaced by vocalist John Torra this time around.

== Discography ==
Title	Artist	Released	Label
Dataclan (EP)	Dataclan	1985	Independent Release
Blackout in the Red Room	Love/Hate	February 22, 1990	Columbia Records
Wasted In America	Love/Hate	March 10, 1992	Columbia Records
Let's Rumble	Love/Hate	April 1, 1994	Calibre Records
I'm Not Happy	Love/Hate	September 19, 1995	Mayhem Records
Livin' Off Layla	Love/Hate	1997	SK-9 Records
Let's Eat	Love/Hate	June 1, 1999	Perris Records
Shrinking Violet	L.A. Guns	June 1, 1999	Perris Records
Greatest & Latest	Love/Hate	April 25, 2000	Cleopatra Records
Adler's Appetite (EP)	Adler's Appetite	February 2005	Arrogant Bastard
Vegas Must Die	Jizzy Pearl	July 19, 2005	Shrapnel Records
Just A Boy	Jizzy Pearl	October 30, 2007	Shrapnel Records
Acoustic Gypsy Live	L.A. Guns	September 27, 2011	Favored Nations Entertainment
Crucified	Jizzy Pearl	December 20, 2013	Independent Release
Quiet Riot 10	Quiet Riot	June 27, 2014	RSM Records
All You Need Is Soul	Jizzy Pearl	May 11, 2018	Frontiers Records
Hell, CA	Love/Hate	February 11, 2022	Golden Robot Records
Punk Rock Fiesta!	Love/Hate	March 1, 2025	Kenyon Records
