= New Ocean Media =

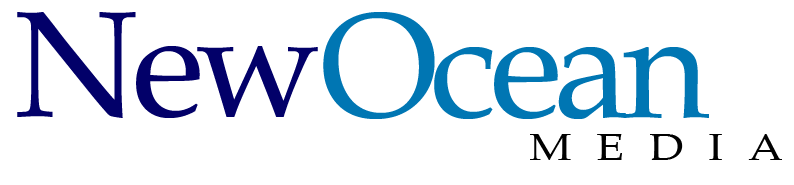
- Founded: 2005
- Country of origin: U.S.
- Official website: newoceanmedia.com

New Ocean Media is a Birmingham, Alabama-based public relations firm. It is a privately held corporation with offices in Birmingham, Alabama. It also operates a record label and an artist management firm.

New Ocean Media has divisions devoted to national PR, tour press, TV and film song placement, music video servicing, radio promotion, artist development, and social media.

== History ==
New Ocean Media was founded in 2005 and is a leading US music and entertainment public relations firm. It works with clients in various sectors of the entertainment industry including record labels, bands, artists, music supervisors, music management firms, radio stations, television and film companies, and music producers.

== Notable clients ==
- Warner Music Group
- Capitol Records
- EMI
- Universal Records
- Dualtone Records
- Glassnote Records
- Sony Music
- Island/Def Jam
- Motörhead
- Clutch
- Buckcherry
- Nothing More
- Dream Theater
- Saxon
- Red
- Asking Alexandria
- Adelitas Way
- Brian "Head" Welch
- A Day to Remember
- Jive Records
- Britney Spears
- Framing Hanley
- Adler
- Hinder
- Candlebox
- Tantric
- Union Entertainment Group (UEG)
- Silent Majority Group
- secondhand serenade
- Lynam
- In Flames
- Cinderella
- Sebastian Bach
- Kevin Costner
