= Lynam (band) =

American hard rock band

- Origin: Birmingham, Alabama, U.S.
- Genres: Hard rock, glam rock
- Years active: 2001-present
- Labels: E.M.G. (2001-2005); DRT Entertainment / Universal Records (2006-2007); New Ocean Media (2008-2009); Mascot Records / Megaforce Records (2009-2010); Island Def Jam (2011-2012)
- Members: Jacob Bunton; David Lynam; Mark Dzier
- Past members: David Brown; Brian Jones; Cody Elliott; Lonny Paul
- Website: www.lynammusic.com

Lynam is an American hard rock band from Birmingham, Alabama, United States.

== History ==
Formed in Birmingham, Alabama in 2001 after the breakup of Jacob Bunton's major-label band Mars Electric, Lynam is often aligned with the retro metal movement of the mid-2000s generation. Led by frontman and principal songwriter Jacob Bunton, the band is heavily influenced by Def Leppard and has drawn comparisons to Wolfmother.

From 2002 to 2004, the band self-released three albums; "White Trash Superstar"; "Bling! Bling!" and "Life in Reverse". Their fourth, 2006's Slave to the Machine, was released after the band signed to DRT Records/Universal Records. This album peaked at No. 21 on Billboard's Top Independent Albums chart and No. 19 on its Top Heatseekers chart. The album's first single, "Tanis" achieved the No. 1 spot on both the active rock independent chart and the mainstream rock independent chart. Their fifth album, Tragic City Symphony, was released on August 26, 2008 by New Ocean Media. This album features the song "Save My Soul," which peaked at No. 5 on the active rock independent chart. On October 5, 2010, Lynam announced that their live CD, Thank You Good Night!, would be their final album. The members of the band want to "explore different opportunities outside of Lynam" but stress that they are not breaking up any time soon and will continue to play shows. The summer of 2012 the band announced on their website that they would be recording an EP entitled "Halfway To Hell", to be released late in 2012.

In 2006 - 2008 Lynam opened tour dates for bands such as Saliva, Live, Fuel, and Puddle of Mudd. They opened for Hinder and Eighteen Visions on their 2006 tour.

At the end of January 2008 they performed on Motley Cruise, a 4-day cruise in the Caribbean (Miami, Key West and Cozumel, MX) with Vince Neil, Skid Row, Ratt, Slaughter and Endeverafter.

The band was set to open for Cinderella and Warrant during their summer 2008 tour. However, due to Tom Keifer of Cinderella having a hemorrhaged vocal cord, the tour was cancelled.

Lynam performed on another cruise, ShipRocked, November 15–20, 2009 with Queensrÿche, Tesla, Skid Row, Broken Teeth, EndeverafteR, Stereoside, and Stone Rider.

Despite the 2010 announcement, Lynam has continued to play shows regularly. Lynam played Rocklahoma 2012, on June 30, 2012 opened for Slaughter in New Orleans, LA and in September 2012 did a run of shows opening for Hinder.

In March 2012, it was announced that Jacob is now also the lead singer for Steven Adler's newest project, simply titled Adler. The Adler album, entitled "Back From the Dead" was released November 20, 2012 by New Ocean Media. The first single and video from "Back From the Dead" is entitled "The One That You Hated." Jacob's Adler bandmate Lonny Paul has since joined Lynam, along with returning bassist Mark Dzier.

== Members ==
=== Current members ===
- Jacob Bunton - guitar (2001–present), vocals (2003–present)
- David Lynam - drums (2001–present)
- Mark Dzier - bass (2002–2011, 2013–present)

=== Former members ===
- David Brown - vocals (2001-2003)
- Brian Jones - bass (2001-2002)
- Cody Elliott - bass (2011-2013)
- Lonny Paul - guitar (2013–2015)

== Discography ==
- White Trash Superstar (2002), E.M.G.
- Bling! Bling! (2003), E.M.G.
- Life in Reverse (2004), E.M.G.
- Slave to the Machine (2006), DRT Entertainment / Universal Records
- Tragic City Symphony (2008), Mascot/Megaforce Records
- Thank You Good Night! (2010), Island/Def Jam
- Halfway To Hell (2013), New Ocean Media
- Bombshell (2015), New Ocean Media
