= Kiss or Kill (album) =

Studio album by Endeverafter
- Released: October 30, 2007
- Genre: Glam metal
- Length: 46:15
- Label: Razor & Tie

Endeverafter chronology
Blood on the Stage (2005)	Kiss or Kill (2007)	From the Ashes of Sin (2007)

Professional ratings
Review scores
Source	Rating
AllMusic	2.5/5 stars
Hard Rock Hideout	9/10

Kiss or Kill is the first and only studio album by the heavy metal band Endeverafter. It was released in 2007 on Razor & Tie.

"I Wanna Be Your Man" was included on the North American release of Guitar Hero On Tour: Modern Hits and released as downloadable content for Rock Band 2. A music video for "Baby Baby Baby" was also made to promote the album during its release. The song "No More Words" was used for former WWE Champion Jeff Hardy's theme song.

== Track listing ==
Album release
No.	Title	Length
1.	"I Wanna Be Your Man"	3:06
2.	"Baby Baby Baby"	4:14
3.	"Gotta Get Out"	4:04
4.	"Poison"	4:14
5.	"Next Best Thing"	5:18
6.	"Tip of My Tongue"	4:06
7.	"Road to Destruction"	5:41
8.	"All Night"	3:35
9.	"Slave"	3:44
10.	"From the Ashes of Sin"	4:09
11.	"Long Way Home"	6:14
Total length:		48:25

Bonus track
No.	Title	Length
12.	"No More Words"	4:28

iTunes bonus track
No.	Title	Length
12.	"He Said She Said"	3:37

eMusic bonus track
No.	Title	Length
12.	"Let Go"	4:03
