= Mars Electric =

American rock band

- Mars Electric, 1999

Background information
- Also known as: Wish
- Origin: Birmingham, Alabama
- Genres: Hard rock Glam rock
- Years active: 1995–2000
- Labels: Atlantic Records; Columbia Records; Portrait Records; Atenzia Records
- Past members: Jacob Bunton; Carl Ray Hopper; Matt Finn; Michael Swann; Chris Simmons Jesse Suttle

Mars Electric was an American rock band from Birmingham, Alabama.

== History ==
Lead singer Jacob Bunton first formed the group under the name Wish in Birmingham in 1995. They signed with Atlantic Records in 1997 and recorded an album, but Atlantic dropped them before releasing any of their material. In 1999, legendary A&R guru John Kalodner signed the band to Columbia and released their debut record Beautiful Something in February 2000. The band consisted of Bunton on lead vocals, guitarist Michael Swann (later replaced by Chris Simons), Bassist Carl Ray Hopper, and drummer Matt Finn. The group toured with Stone Temple Pilots, Mötley Crüe, Live, 3 Doors Down, Nickelback, Vertical Horizon, Alice Cooper and Papa Roach following the album's release.

Mars Electric broke up at the end of 2000, and Bunton put together a group called Lynam, which would go on to have its own major-label contract a few years later. However, in 2003, Magnus Soderkvist of Swedish label Atenzia Records learned the group had recorded a second album which was never released, and offered to put it out on his label. The result was Fame Among the Vulgar, released in May 2003. By this time, Lynam had become Bunton's primary concern, and Simmons went on to play with Leon Russell later in the decade.

== Members ==
- Jacob Bunton - vocals, guitar (1995-2000)
- Carl Hopper - bass (1995-2000)
- Matt Finn - drums (1995-2000)
- Michael Swann - guitar (1995-1997)
- Chris Simmons - guitar (1997-2000)
- Jesse Suttle-drums 1995

== Discography ==
- Beautiful Something (Portrait/Columbia, 2000)
- Fame Among the Vulgar (Atenzia Records, 2003)
