= The Aquabats discography =

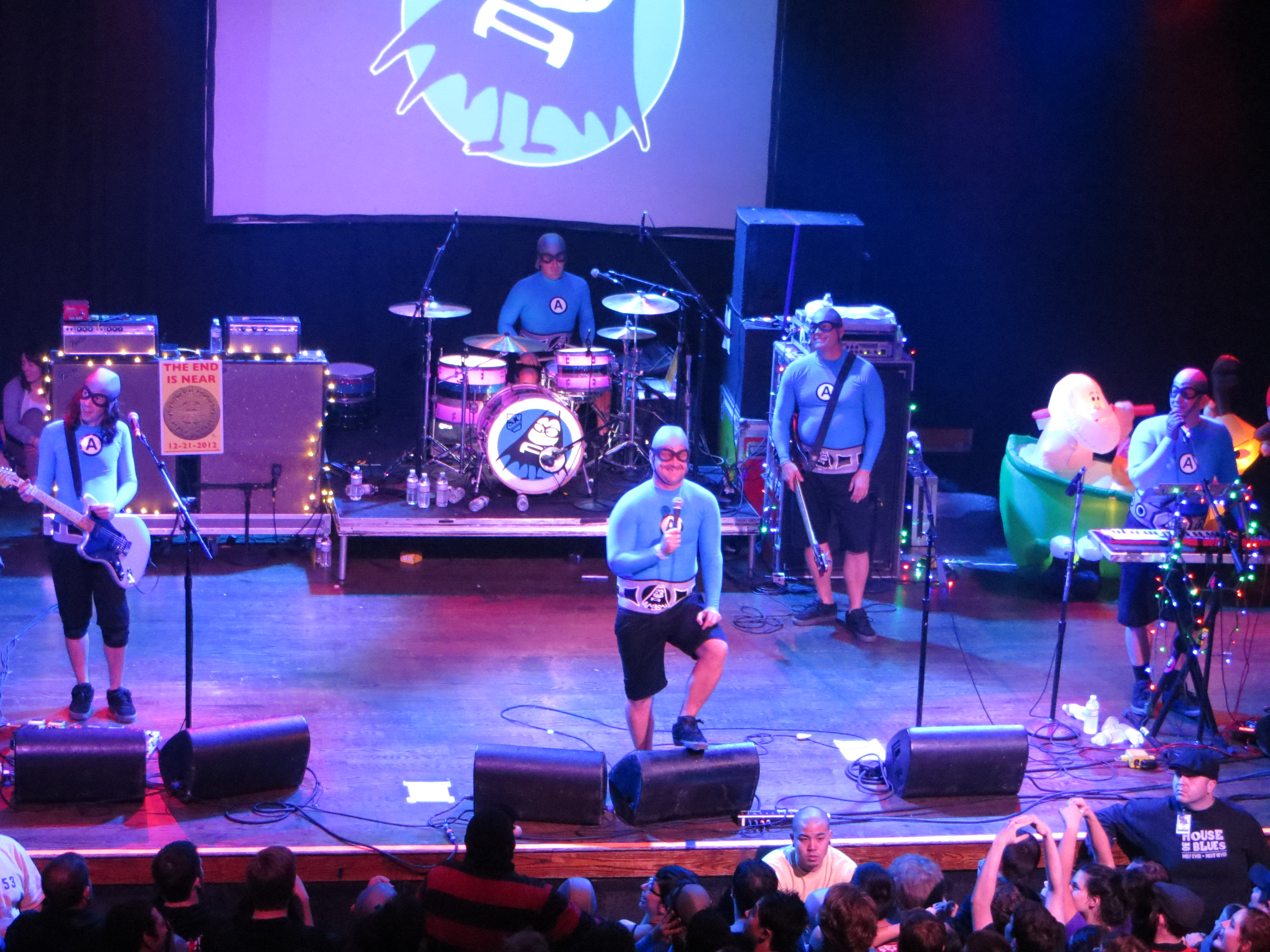
- Studio albums: 7
- Extended plays: 3
- Compilation albums: 2
- Video albums: 1
- Music videos: 8
- Other appearances: 11

The discography of The Aquabats, an Orange County, California-based rock band, consists of seven studio albums, two compilation albums, one soundtrack album, three EPs, one live album, one video album and eight music videos, among other recordings.

The Aquabats were initially formed as a ska band in 1994 by vocalist The MC Bat Commander, bassist Crash McLarson and trumpeter Catboy. Attracting a significant local cult following for their eccentric music and theatrical stage shows, the band independently recorded and released their debut LP, The Return of The Aquabats, in 1995, ultimately selling over 24,000 copies without any distribution. After being signed to Goldenvoice Records in 1997, the band released their sophomore album, The Fury of The Aquabats!, during the height of the American ska revival; it became their minor mainstream breakthrough, peaking at number 172 on the Billboard 200. The Aquabats' third album, 1999's The Aquabats vs. the Floating Eye of Death!, proved to be a relative commercial disappointment following the band's complete shift in musical direction, resulting in The Aquabats' dismissal from Goldenvoice in 2000.

Despite releasing a B-sides compilation and live DVD through Fearless Records in the early 2000s, The Aquabats spent most of this period in relative inactivity, leading to radical changes in both the band's line-up and musical style. In 2004, the group independently recorded the EP Yo! Check Out This Ride!, signing to Nitro Records several months later. 2005's Charge!!, The Aquabats' first release as a new wave-influenced quintet, effectively revitalized the band's career, meeting with positive reviews and a return to consistent touring. Although plans for a follow-up album were announced in 2007, The Aquabats were dropped from Nitro in 2009, continuing as an independent band before rejoining Fearless in late 2010 to release their fifth studio album, Hi-Five Soup!, which debuted at 181 on the Billboard 200.

In 2019, as the result of a successful Kickstarter campaign to help produce several new albums and the continuation of The Aquabats' live-action television series The Aquabats! Super Show!, the band digitally released their first live album, The Fury of The Aquabats! Live at The Fonda!, as well as a compilation of songs from Super Show!'s first season, The Aquabats! Super Show! Television Soundtrack: Volume One, which was later given a wide physical release and debuted at 165 on the Billboard 200, The Aquabats' highest placement on the chart to date. The band's sixth studio album, Kooky Spooky...In Stereo, was released on August 21, 2020 on The Aquabats' own independent label, Gloopy Records.

== Albums ==
=== Studio albums ===
Year	Album details	Peak chart positions			
Year	Album details	US	US Ind.	US Heat	US Rock
1995	The Return of The Aquabats: Released: December 8, 1995; Label: Horchata; Format: CD, CS, LP	—	—	—	—
1997	The Fury of The Aquabats!: Released: October 28, 1997 April 6, 2018 (re-issue); Label: Time Bomb Gloopy (re-issue); Format: CD, CS, LP	172	—	12	—
1999	The Aquabats vs. the Floating Eye of Death!: Released: October 26, 1999; Label: Goldenvoice; Format: CD, CS, LP	—	—	35	—
2005	Charge!!: Released: June 7, 2005; Label: Nitro; Format: CD	—	30	21	—
2011	Hi-Five Soup!: Released: January 18, 2011; Label: Fearless; Format: CD	181	24	5	45
2020	Kooky Spooky...In Stereo: Released: August 21, 2020; Label: Gloopy; Format: CD, LP	—	—	—	—
2024	Finally!: Released: June 21, 2024; Label: Gloopy; Format: CD, LP	—	—	—	—
"—" denotes releases that did not chart.

=== Compilation albums ===
Year	Album details	Peak chart positions			
Year	Album details	US	US Ind.	US Heat	US Rock
2000	Myths, Legends and Other Amazing Adventures, Vol. 2: Released: November 7, 2000; Label: Fearless; Format: CD	—	—	—	—
2019	The Aquabats! Super Show! Television Soundtrack: Volume One: Released: March 19, 2019 (digital release) June 7, 2019; Label: Gloopy; Format: CD, LP	165	3	1	32
"—" denotes releases that did not chart.

=== Live albums ===
Year	Album details	Notes
2019	The Fury of The Aquabats! Live at The Fonda!: Released: March 19, 2019; Label: Gloopy; Format: Digital download, streaming	A recording of The Aquabats' 20th anniversary performance of The Fury of The Aquabats! at The Fonda Theatre in Los Angeles, California on April 8, 2018. Released as an exclusive download for backers of The Aquabats' 2018 Kickstarter campaign, a general release was released May 8, 2020.

Live bootlegs

Year	Title	Notes
June 6, 2014	The Aquabats Cadet Beach Party	An 18-track bootleg recording of The Aquabats' all-request acoustic campfire sing-a-long set at the 2002 Aquacadet Summit in Huntington Beach, California on January 19, 2002. This was an officially endorsed bootleg released by Related Records and Pirate Ship Records as a limited run of 300 compact cassette tapes as well as a digital download.

== Extended plays and singles ==
=== EPs ===
Year	Album details	Peak chart positions
Year	Album details	US
Year	Album details	Hot Singles Sales
2004	Yo! Check Out This Ride! EP: Released: 2004; Label: none; Format: CD	—
2010	Radio Down!: Released: November 9, 2010; Label: Fearless; Format: MP3 download, CD	10
2021	I Want A Hippopotamus for Christmas Too!: Released: November 19, 2021; Label: Gloopy; Format: Download, CD	—

=== Singles ===
Cassette singles

Year	Title	Album	Notes
1996	"Martian Girl" "CD Repo Man"	The Return of the Aquabats	A cassette-only Horchata Records release of two songs from The Return... which was handed out by the band to promoters, venues and labels prior to the album's official release. The songs on this cassette were a different mix than the ones on the final album.

CD singles

Year	Title	Album	Notes
1997	"Super Rad!"	The Fury of The Aquabats!	Official CD singles issued by Goldenvoice and Time Bomb Recordings
1997	"My Skateboard!"	The Fury of The Aquabats!	Official CD singles issued by Goldenvoice and Time Bomb Recordings

Digital singles

Year	Title	Album	Notes
April 1, 2005	"Fashion Zombies!"	Charge!!	Digital download offered exclusively through The Aquabats' website, posted on the same day the band officially announced Charge!!.
December 14, 2010	"The Shark Fighter!"	Hi-Five Soup!	Digital stream first released through The Aquabats' Facebook page before being put up for iTunes download on January 4, 2011.
April 26, 2019	"COBRAMAN THEME! / BURGER RAIN!"	The Aquabats! Super Show! Television Soundtrack: Volume One	
October 25, 2019	"Skeleton Inside!"	Kooky Spooky...In Stereo	
April 10, 2020	"Pajamazon!"	Kooky Spooky...In Stereo	
May 1, 2020	"No One Wants to Party!"	Kooky Spooky...In Stereo	
July 31, 2020	"Karate Body!"	Kooky Spooky...In Stereo	
May 31, 2024	"No Rewind!"	Finally!	
June 14, 2024	"Dr. Space Mummy!"	Finally!	

Vinyl singles

From 1998 to 1999, The Aquabats planned to release a series of nine limited edition 7" picture discs, one for each member of the band, featuring an unreleased demo or B-side alongside a track from The Fury of The Aquabats!. Due to Goldenvoice Records' financial constraints at the time, only four of the nine discs were produced.

Year	Title	Tracks	Label
1998	Catboy vs. The Cat With 2 Heads	1. "Cat With 2 Heads"	Goldenvoice/Time Bomb
1998	Catboy vs. The Cat With 2 Heads	2. "Tiny Pants" (demo version)	Goldenvoice/Time Bomb
1998	Dr. Rock vs. Clowny Clown Clown	1. "Magic Chicken"	Goldenvoice/Time Bomb
1998	Dr. Rock vs. Clowny Clown Clown	2. "Why Rock?"	Goldenvoice/Time Bomb
1998	Ultra Kyu vs. The Sandfleas	1. "The Ballad of Mr. Bonkers" (demo version)	Goldenvoice/Time Bomb
1998	Ultra Kyu vs. The Sandfleas	2. "The Story of Nothing"	Goldenvoice/Time Bomb
1998	Chainsaw vs. Powdered Milk Man	1. "Powdered Milk Man"	Goldenvoice/Time Bomb
1998	Chainsaw vs. Powdered Milk Man	2. "Radiation Song" (demo version)	Goldenvoice/Time Bomb

In July 2017, to coincide with a U.S. tour, The Aquabats released an exclusive 7" single as part of a fan ticket package featuring alternate full-length recordings of two songs from The Aquabats! Super Show!.

Year	Title	Tracks	Label
2017	Burger Rain	1. "Burger Rain"	Self-released
2017	Burger Rain	2. "Beat Fishin'"	Self-released

Miscellaneous singles

Year	Title	Tracks	Notes
December 2009	Holiday Extravaganza!	1. "Holiday Road!" (Lindsey Buckingham)	A free CD-R passed out to attendees of The Aquabats' 2009 holiday shows. Its songs were later released for download on the band's website and much later appeared on their 2021 Christmas EP I Want a Hippopotamus for Christmas Too!.
December 2009	Holiday Extravaganza!	2. "Santa Claus' Party!"	A free CD-R passed out to attendees of The Aquabats' 2009 holiday shows. Its songs were later released for download on the band's website and much later appeared on their 2021 Christmas EP I Want a Hippopotamus for Christmas Too!.

== Demos ==
The following are demo versions and otherwise unreleased recordings of songs released exclusively by The Aquabats.

Year	Title	Tracks	Notes
1994	The Revenge of the Midget Punchers	1. "Ska Robot Army"	The Aquabats' debut demo cassette. Under 500 copies were released. The untitled track is a spoken story.
1994	The Revenge of the Midget Punchers	2. "CD Repo Man"	The Aquabats' debut demo cassette. Under 500 copies were released. The untitled track is a spoken story.
1994	The Revenge of the Midget Punchers	3. "Martian Girl"	The Aquabats' debut demo cassette. Under 500 copies were released. The untitled track is a spoken story.
1994	The Revenge of the Midget Punchers	4. "Marshmellow Man" [sic]	The Aquabats' debut demo cassette. Under 500 copies were released. The untitled track is a spoken story.
1994	The Revenge of the Midget Punchers	5. "Untitled"	The Aquabats' debut demo cassette. Under 500 copies were released. The untitled track is a spoken story.
1994	The Revenge of the Midget Punchers	6. "Pinch and Roll"	The Aquabats' debut demo cassette. Under 500 copies were released. The untitled track is a spoken story.
1995	Bat Boy	1. "It's Crazy, Man!"	Two different pressings of this demo cassette were printed in a combined run of 360 copies. The song "Doll Art" is an upbeat acoustic cover of Hole's "Doll Parts" with semi-improvised lyrics.
1995	Bat Boy	2. "Marshmallow Man"	Two different pressings of this demo cassette were printed in a combined run of 360 copies. The song "Doll Art" is an upbeat acoustic cover of Hole's "Doll Parts" with semi-improvised lyrics.
1995	Bat Boy	3. "My Skateboard"	Two different pressings of this demo cassette were printed in a combined run of 360 copies. The song "Doll Art" is an upbeat acoustic cover of Hole's "Doll Parts" with semi-improvised lyrics.
1995	Bat Boy	4. "Phantasma del Mar"	Two different pressings of this demo cassette were printed in a combined run of 360 copies. The song "Doll Art" is an upbeat acoustic cover of Hole's "Doll Parts" with semi-improvised lyrics.
1995	Bat Boy	5. "Doll Art"	Two different pressings of this demo cassette were printed in a combined run of 360 copies. The song "Doll Art" is an upbeat acoustic cover of Hole's "Doll Parts" with semi-improvised lyrics.
1999	Three Song Sampler	1. "The Thing in the Bass Amp"	A CD sampler of three unmixed and unmastered tracks from The Aquabats vs. the Floating Eye of Death!. "Better Than This?" is an alternately titled "Lotto Fever". Issued by Goldenvoice Records and Time Bomb Recordings.
1999	Three Song Sampler	2. "Giant Robot-Birdhead"	A CD sampler of three unmixed and unmastered tracks from The Aquabats vs. the Floating Eye of Death!. "Better Than This?" is an alternately titled "Lotto Fever". Issued by Goldenvoice Records and Time Bomb Recordings.
1999	Three Song Sampler	3. "Better Than This?"	A CD sampler of three unmixed and unmastered tracks from The Aquabats vs. the Floating Eye of Death!. "Better Than This?" is an alternately titled "Lotto Fever". Issued by Goldenvoice Records and Time Bomb Recordings.
July 2002	Versions Not Demos	1. "Awesome Forces"	This was a free CD-R printed in a limited run of 100 copies, passed out to attendees at an Aquabats show at the El Rey Theatre in Los Angeles on July 31, 2002.
July 2002	Versions Not Demos	2. "Comic Book Man"	This was a free CD-R printed in a limited run of 100 copies, passed out to attendees at an Aquabats show at the El Rey Theatre in Los Angeles on July 31, 2002.
May 2003	May 2003 Demos	1. "Awesome Forces" (new mix)	These were three demo tracks The Aquabats released through their website via download between the hours of 12 AM and 8 AM on May 9, 2003.
May 2003	May 2003 Demos	2. "Yo, Check Out This Ride"	These were three demo tracks The Aquabats released through their website via download between the hours of 12 AM and 8 AM on May 9, 2003.
May 2003	May 2003 Demos	3. "Mechanical Ape"	These were three demo tracks The Aquabats released through their website via download between the hours of 12 AM and 8 AM on May 9, 2003.

=== "Other Rarities" (digital b-sides) ===
In November 2000, to promote the release of the b-sides compilation Myths, Legends and Other Amazing Adventures, Vol. 2, The Aquabats launched a sub-section of their website providing free downloads of the majority of their then-unreleased demos and rarities dating from 1995 to 1999. The following songs are demos and b-sides that were not previously released on either a demo cassette or compilation:

"Cold Raw Gold"
"Giant Robot Birdhead" [instrumental]
"Green Ghost"
"The Grey Man"
"I Love the Monster"

"The Lonely Horseman"
"Mucho Gusto"
"Return of the British Knight"
"Sequence Erase" [instrumental]
"Todd-1 in Space Mountain Land"

== Videography ==
Year	Album details
2003	Serious Awesomeness!: Released: November 18, 2003; Label: Fearless; Format: DVD

=== Music videos ===
Year	Song	Director	Album
1995	"CD Repo Man"		The Return of The Aquabats
1997	"Super Rad!"	Bobcat Goldthwait	The Fury of The Aquabats!
2005	"Fashion Zombies!"	Christian Jacobs	Charge!!
2018	"Powdered Milk Man!"		The Fury of The Aquabats!
2020	"Pajamazon!"		Kooky Spooky...In Stereo
2020	"Karate Body!"		Kooky Spooky...In Stereo
2024	"No Rewind!"		Finally!
2024	"Dr. Space Mummy!"		Finally!
2024	"Let's Go Live in a Cave!"	Daniel Cupps	Finally!
2024	"Whatever Forever!"	Ben Lashes	Finally!
2025	"Whatever Forever!"	Lucas Nyhus	Finally!

== Compilation appearances ==
The following Aquabats songs were released on compilation albums. This is not an exhaustive list; songs that were first released on the band's albums are not included.

Year	Release details	Track
1996	California Ska-Quake, Vol. 2: The Aftershock: Released: September 3, 1996; Label: Moon Ska; Format: CD	"CD Repo Man" (alternate version)
1997	Take Warning: The Songs of Operation Ivy: Released: August 26, 1997; Label: Glue Factory; Format: CD	"Knowledge" (originally performed by Operation Ivy)
1997	We Are Not Devo: Released: September 30, 1997; Label: Centipede; Format: CD	"Love Without Anger" (originally performed by Devo)
1997	The Ska Parade: Runnin' Naked Thru the Cornfield: Released: October 14, 1997; Label: A to Y; Format: CD	"Theme Song!" (live on Ska Parade radio show)
1997	Freedom Sounds: A Tribute to the Skatalites: Released: October 21, 1997; Label: Shanachie; Format: CD	"Ska Boss" (originally performed by The Skatalites)
2000	Punk Goes Metal: Released: 2000; Label: Fearless; Format: CD	"Why Rock?"
2000	Rice Capades: Released: 2000; Label: Horchata; Format: CD	"Lovers of Loving Love!" (demo version); "Sandy Face!"
2005	Dead Bands Party: A Tribute to Oingo Boingo: Released: May 10, 2005; Label: Indianola; Format: CD	"The Controller" (originally performed by Oingo Boingo)
2010	Yo Gabba Gabba!: Music Is Awesome! Vol. 2: Released: August 31, 2010; Label: Filter U.S. Recordings; Format: CD, download	"Pool Party!" (alternate version)
2010	Mega64: The Soundtrack: Released: September 3, 2010; Label: Mega64; Format: CD	"Sequence Erase" (instrumental version)
2011	Yo Gabba Gabba!: Music Is Awesome! Vol. 3: Released: September 13, 2011; Label: Filter U.S. Recordings; Format: CD, download	"I Like to Share with My Friends"

== Horchata Records ==
Horchata Records was the record label owned and operated by The Aquabats from 1994 to 2001.

Named after the beverage of which the Jacobs brothers shared a particular affinity, Horchata Records was originally conceived by Parker Jacobs in the early 1990s for use with his band GOGO13. Though the Horchata label appeared on GOGO13's demo tapes and show posters, it was not made official until 1994 when Christian Jacobs established the Horchata Records LLC to release The Aquabats' early demos. Following The Aquabats' signing to Goldenvoice, Horchata became used for the band's mail order merchandise until 1999, when Parker Jacobs began re-developing it into a branded record label.

According to Parker Jacobs, he had planned to expand Horchata into its own entity, releasing music from bands both real and fictionalized within The Aquabats' universe: "it wasn't a specific sound", Jacobs explained, "but a movement of fun, theatrical bands like The Aquabats and Sandfleas". The official Horchata Records website listed The Aquabats and all of their respective side projects among their roster, including active bands such as GOGO13, The Sandfleas, The Moon Monkeys and Digital Unicorn, as well as either planned or entirely fictional groups like Planet V, Cactus Jack and The She-Goats. Horchata's roster also included the indie pop band Majestic, surf-punk group The Immortals, new wave band NU-TRA and Utah ska band The Soulutions, though none of these bands would ultimately release material through Horchata. Many of these bands, both real and fictional, were later represented on the 2000 Horchata sampler album Rice Capades.

Following their dismissal from Goldenvoice Records in 2000, The Aquabats entered a period of extended inactivity and limited finances, during which it became clear Jacobs' ambitions for Horchata had become unfeasible and the label eventually faded into non-existence in 2001.

The following is a list of releases under the Horchata Records label:

Year	Artist	Album
1993	GOGO13	Demo Tape O' Fun
1994	GOGO13	Toy Guns and Pixy Stix EP (unreleased)
1994	The Aquabats	The Revenge of the Midget Punchers
1995	The Aquabats	Bat Boy
1995	The Aquabats	The Return of The Aquabats
1996	Attaboy Skip	Size 8 EP
1999	The Moon Monkeys	So Far, Far Out! EP
1999	The Sandfleas	Four Songs Four Jerks EP
2000	Various artists	Rice Capades: Music Sampler Vol. 1
2001	Digital Unicorn	Theirs Travel Began and Loaded the Dream
