= Rice Capades =

Compilation album by Various artists
- Released: April 6, 2000
- Genre: Rock, ska, new wave, comedy, surf rock, electronic
- Length: 38:38
- Label: Horchata Records
- Producer: The Aquabats, Vahe Manoukian

The Aquabats and Horchata Records Present: Rice Capades, Music Sampler Vol. 1 is a 2000 compilation album independently produced and compiled by American rock band The Aquabats and released on their self-operated record label Horchata Records.

Rice Capades was originally made to be given away as a door prize to attendees of the 1999/2000 Aquacadet Summit, The Aquabats' then-annual fan convention, which was held at The Galaxy Theater in Santa Ana, California on April 6, 2000. The compilation was later sold online and at the band's concerts before eventually falling out of print.

== Compilation overview and track breakdown ==
As a sampler album for The Aquabats' Horchata Records label, Rice Capades is primarily a showcase for The Aquabats, GOGO13 and their side projects of varying levels of legitimacy, as well as several non-Horchata bands.

- The Aquabats contributed two then-unreleased demo tracks to Rice Capades, including an early demo of "Lovers of Loving Love!" from 1999's The Aquabats vs. the Floating Eye of Death! and an early version of "Sandy Face!" which would later appear on the 2000 compilation Myths, Legends and Other Amazing Adventures, Vol. 2.
- "Espionage" and "Idiot Box" were both recorded for GOGO13's 1994 EP Toy Guns & Pixy Stix, which went ultimately unreleased due to the band's dislike of the recording quality.
- Rice Capades features the only known recordings by Tiki Tonga, Wizzle and Planet V, all of whom were completely fictionalized bands conceived for the compilation and whose songs were largely written and recorded by The Aquabats themselves under aliases. One notable exception is the music to Planet V's "To Serve Man", which was composed by NU-TRA frontman Vahe Manoukian.
- "Funky Rubberband (Radio Lithuania Mix)" is a non-album track by one-man electronic project Digital Unicorn, fronted by The Aquabats' Adam Deibert under the pseudonym "Mann". Digital Unicorn would later release a full-length album on Horchata, 2001's Theirs Travel Began and Loaded the Dream.
- "My Baby's Got a Poopy Diaper" is taken from The Sandfleas' 1999 EP Four Songs Four Jerks on Horchata. At this time, the Sandfleas were a short-lived side project of The Aquabats, consisting of Parker Jacobs on vocals, Christian Jacobs on drums, Chainsaw on bass, Crash McLarson on guitar and Tyler Jacobs on backing vocals.
- NU-TRA was a new wave/synthpunk band who acted as a frequent opening act for The Aquabats' southern Californian shows. "Superhuman" was not released on an official album, though a music video for the song was shot in 2000 as a promo video for the launch of NU-TRA's website.
- "Sympathy for the Narwhal" was a solo track composed by Aquabats producer Scott Schultz under his pseudonym "The Seaghost". Schultz was also lead singer for the indie pop band Majestic, whose song "Bub" from their 1998 debut Live It Up! on Shelflife Records also appears on Rice Capades.
- "Le Pigbat" was the pseudonym of The Aquabats' graphic designer and GOGO13 co-founder Tyler Jacobs. A French pop-inspired endeavor, Le Pigbat performed live as part of The Aquabats' 1999/2000 Aquacadet Summit and intended to release an EP through Horchata entitled The 9th Richest Man in the World which was eventually cancelled.
- The Moon Monkeys, a surf band founded by original Aquabats guitarist Ben "The Brain" Bergeson, contributed the track "Big Top Stomp" from their album So Far, Far Out!, released in 1997 on Horchata Records.
- The Soulutions were a ska band from Cedar City, Utah which was formed in 1995 by several original members of GOGO13. "Do Right" is taken from the band's 1999 album This is What You Get on Orchard Records.

== Track listing ==
Track	Performer	Release
1. "Island Paradise" (S. Berrett, C. Jacobs, P. Jacobs)	Tiki Tonga	Unreleased
2. "Sandy Face!" (The Aquabats)	The Aquabats	Later appeared on Myths, Legends and Other Amazing Adventures, Vol. 2 (2000)
3. "Espionage" (GOGO13)	GOGO13	From the unreleased Toy Guns & Pixy Stix EP (1994)
4. "Funky Rubberband (Radio Lithuania Mix)" (Mann)	Digital Unicorn	Unreleased
5. "My Baby's Got a Poopy Diaper" (The Sandfleas)	The Sandfleas	From Four Songs Four Jerks (1999)
6. "Superhuman" (V. Manoukian)	NU-TRA	Unreleased
7. "Lovers of Loving Love (Really Bad Demo Version)" (The Aquabats)	The Aquabats	Unreleased demo from The Aquabats vs. the Floating Eye of Death! (1999)
8. "Sympathy for the Narwhal" (Seaghost)	DJ Seaghost	Unreleased
9. "Monsieur Hyde" (S. Gainsbourg)	Le Pigbat	Unreleased
10. "Fungus Lips" (The Aquabats)	Wizzle	Unreleased
11. "Bub" (S. Schultz, A. Watene)	Majestic	From Live It Up (1999)
12. "To Serve Man" (B. Bergeson, P. Jacobs, V. Manoukian)	Planet V	Unreleased
13. "Big Top Stomp" (The Moon Monkeys)	The Moon Monkeys	From So Far, Far Out! (1997)
14. "Do Right" (The Soulutions)	The Soulutions	From This Is What You Get (1999)
15. "Baja Bound" (M. Howe)	The Immortals	Unreleased
16. "Idiot Box (1994)" (C. Watkins, P. Jacobs)	GOGO13	From the unreleased Toy Guns & Pixy Stix EP (1994)
