= The Sandfleas =

- The Sandfleas (with Silver Skull in background), as seen in the liner notes of 1997's The Fury of The Aquabats!. Artwork by Parker Jacobs.

Background information
- Origin: Orange County, California
- Genres: Punk rock
- Years active: 1997-1999, 2005
- Label: Horchata Records
- Spinoff of: The Aquabats

The Sandfleas are a fictional gang of masked hooligans within the mythology of the superhero-themed American comedy band The Aquabats, who featured prominently as the latter's "arch enemies" in their stage shows and related media during the late 1990s.

From 1997 to 1999, The Sandfleas occasionally performed as a live band almost exclusively as an opening act for The Aquabats, fronted by Aquabats creative consultant and GOGO13 singer Parker Jacobs and filled out by a rotating roster of former and present Aquabats members. The group released one extended play on The Aquabats' Horchata Records label before disbanding shortly afterwards.

== Overview ==
As part of their comic book-inspired superhero aesthetic, The Aquabats have maintained an elaborate fictional mythology and origin story centering on their persona as costumed crime-fighters since the earliest days of their career, including an extensive roster of recurring villains who play into the band's live shows in mock fight scenes and comedic skits. Billed as "The Aquabats' arch enemies", The Sandfleas were depicted as a musical punk band of five obnoxious masked hooligans, intended to be the "bad guy" inversion of The Aquabats' own group of musical do-gooders.

Played by a rotating assortment of The Aquabats' friends and road crew, The Sandfleas became a staple of the band's late 1990s concerts when they would routinely crash The Aquabats' sets and comically antagonize them and the audience, segueing into a staged fight scene which The Sandfleas would inevitably lose. In the documentary "A Band Called the Aquabats!: A Sweaty History of Radness!" featured on the 2003 DVD Serious Awesomeness!, The Sandfleas are also shown having waged mock protests at The Aquabats' concerts, brandishing picket signs with messages including "The Aquabats R Dumb!" and handing out anti-Aquabat pamphlets to fans waiting in line.

In addition to The Aquabats' stage shows, The Sandfleas appeared in most of The Aquabats' promotional material and merchandise during the late 1990s, appearing in the liner note artwork for 1997's The Fury of The Aquabats! and 1999's The Aquabats vs. the Floating Eye of Death!, the band's 1997 coloring book, the 1998 7" picture disc single Ultra Kyu vs. The Sandfleas and a brief cameo in the 1999 television pitch promo The Aquabats in Color!.

In 2013, over a decade since their last canonical appearance with The Aquabats, The Sandfleas made a brief, non-speaking cameo in an animated segment in The Aquabats! Super Show! episode "Bad Apple!", appearing as an unnamed group of "ruffians" who attempt to rob The Aquabats. On April 7, 2018, the group reappeared as stage villains for an Aquabats show at Los Angeles' The Fonda Theatre celebrating the 20th anniversary of the Fury of The Aquabats! album, reprising their role three weeks later as part of the band's set at the Back To The Beach Festival in Huntington Beach.

== Live band ==
According to Parker Jacobs, The Sandfleas' history as a live band began at an Aquabats show in 1996 in which not all of The Aquabats had shown up, prompting the remaining members to don Sandfleas costumes and anonymously take the stage under the name "Mel and Friends". "They played awful surf/Christmas songs and received a violent response from the audience who were expecting the Aquabats", Jacobs recalled, "It was after that, (97?) that I wanted to make them an actual band".

The Sandfleas went through numerous changes in line-ups, frequently consisting of former or original members of The Aquabats. One of the more consistent early line-ups featured Jacobs, Jared Terry (brother of Boyd Terry), original Aquabats guitarist Ben Bergeson, Jamie Morris and Brian Cole, most of whom went on to form the instrumental surf band The Moon Monkeys when Jacobs left to tour with The Aquabats. A later incarnation of The Sandfleas was simply Jacobs backed by Orange County surf-punk band The Immortals.

In 1999, with the expansion of The Aquabats' Horchata Records label which was intended to host a large network of anonymous conceptual novelty bands, Jacobs spearheaded another version of The Sandfleas featuring Aquabats members Christian Jacobs (The MC Bat Commander) on drums, Chad Larson (Crash McLarson) on guitar, Corey Pollock (Chainsaw the Prince of Karate) and Aquabats graphic designer Tyler Jacobs on backing vocals. It was with this line-up that the band recorded the extended play Four Songs Four Jerks, which, according to Parker Jacobs, was written entirely the night before recording. The Aquabats later brought this version of The Sandfleas on tour following the release of their third studio album The Aquabats vs. the Floating Eye of Death!, effectively serving as their own opening band.

The Sandfleas disbanded shortly after the release of Four Songs Four Jerks. Following Parker Jacobs' resignation from full-time creative involvement with The Aquabats in 2000, The Sandfleas eventually disappeared from the band's live shows and mythology. On December 1, 2005, The Sandfleas played a one-off reunion with Aquabats colleagues Bad Credit, Digital Unicorn, GOGO13 and the Moon Monkeys at the Detroit Bar in Costa Mesa, though as of 2018, there has been no official announcement as to whether The Sandfleas will return as a performing band.

== Discography ==
Extended play

- Four Songs Four Jerks (1999, Horchata Records)

1. "Frog Jerky"
2. "My Baby's Got a Poopy Diaper"
3. "Girls Are Weak"
4. "You're Super Duper Dumb and Your Mom is Ugly Too [extended Fang mix]"

Other appearances

- A 20-second non-album track entitled "Smell My Feet" was streamed on The Sandfleas' profile on the Horchata Records website.
- "My Baby's Got a Poopy Diaper" was featured on the 2000 Horchata sampler compilation Rice Capades.

== Band line-up ==
Four Songs Four Jerks line-up

- Mel Sandflea (Parker Jacobs) - vocals
- Breath Sandflea (Chad Larson) - guitar
- Spodie Sandflea (Corey Pollock) - one-stringed bass
- Fang Sandflea (Christian Jacobs) - drums
- Bubba Sandflea (Tyler Jacobs) - backing vocals

Former members

- Taffy Sandflea (Ben Bergeson)
- Bird Sandflea (Jared Terry)
- Ludwig Sandflea (Jamie Morris)
- Cole Sandflea (Brian Cole)
- Mark "The Shark" Howe
- Chris Howe
- Joey
