= Super Rad! =

Single by The Aquabats

from the album The Fury of The Aquabats!
- Released: 1997
- Recorded: 1997
- Genre: Ska punk; surf rock
- Length: 3:02
- Label: Goldenvoice; Time Bomb Recordings
- Songwriter: The Aquabats
- Producer: Jim Goodwin

The Aquabats singles chronology
"Super Rad!" (1997)	"My Skateboard" (1998)

"Super Rad!" is a song by American band the Aquabats which appears on their 1997 album The Fury of The Aquabats!.

== Overview ==
Issued by the Aquabats' then labels Goldenvoice and Time Bomb Recordings, "Super Rad!" was the band's first widely distributed single, and what AbsolutePunk called "single-handedly the gem responsible for putting [The Aquabats] on the map". Musically, the song follows in the ska-influenced style the Aquabats were then known for, featuring a heavily brass-driven melody as well as the surf-inspired lead guitar lines which characterized much of the band's early material. "Super Rad!"'s lyrics have been described by reviewers as an introductory "mission statement" of sorts in reference to the band's superhero-themed persona, exemplified in the chorus "We're on our way/Here we go/We're gonna take over".

Despite not attaining any chart success, "Super Rad!" nevertheless received heavy airplay on college radio and stations such as Los Angeles' influential KROQ-FM during the short-lived American ska revival of the late 1990s, bringing the Aquabats their first taste of moderate mainstream exposure. As such, it is considered to be one of the band's most popular songs, and is almost always performed at every one of their concerts.

== Music video ==
The Bat Commander fights the Cyclopfenstein in a shot from the "Super Rad!" music video.

As the Aquabats started to attract mainstream attention in late 1997, singer Christian Jacobs (The Bat Commander) began to conceptualize adapting the band's superhero mythology for television. In a 2013 interview with the Nerdist, Jacobs mentioned that the video for "Super Rad!" was one of his attempts to show studios that the Aquabats could be "appealing comedic characters in addition to a good band". The video was directed by comedian Bobcat Goldthwait, who also worked with the band in developing and directing their 1998 unaired television pilot The Aquabats! for Buena Vista Television.

Like most of the Aquabats' video projects, the music video for "Super Rad!" features a deliberately campy and brightly colored aesthetic reminiscent of Saturday morning cartoons and 1970s television such as the works of Sid and Marty Krofft. The video's loose plot follows the Aquabats as they're dispatched individually by "The Professor" (Parker Jacobs) to rescue a young Aquacadet being menaced by a duo of thugs. Featuring heavy slapstick humor, each of the Aquabats endures various physical beatings and pratfalls before collectively saving the day.

Actor Ed Begley Jr. makes a brief cameo appearance in the video, driving a General Motors EV1 to which a jogging Jaime the Robot is attached via extension cord. In one scene, the Bat Commander fights with a costumed monster then known as the "Cyclopfenstein" (a portmanteau of cyclops and Scott Klopfenstein, trumpeter for the ska punk band Reel Big Fish, who frequently toured with the Aquabats); the design for this creature would later be used to develop the character of Muno for the children's television series Yo Gabba Gabba!, of which Jacobs co-created.

== Cultural references ==
- "Super Rad!" is featured on the soundtrack for the 1999 family film Soccer Dog: The Movie, where it's played both during a montage of the film's principle soccer team on a winning streak and over the ending credits. The song is also featured in the film's trailer.
- In issue #3 (Sept. 2014) of Marvel Comics' Guardians of the Galaxy spin-off Legendary Star-Lord, a spaceship AI asks Star-Lord if it can "play the Aquabats", to which he responds "Only if I can sing every word". Several pages later, the two are depicted singing aloud the words to "Super Rad!"'s bridge.

== Track listing ==
"Super Rad!" US Promo CD
No.	Title	Length
1.	"Super Rad!"	3:02

"Super Rad!" European CD single
No.	Title	Length
1.	"Super Rad!"	3:02
2.	"Lobster Bucket!"	2:41

== Credits ==
- The Bat Commander! - lead vocals
- Jaime the Robot! - saxophone, vocals
- Chainsaw, the Prince of Karate! - guitar, vocals
- Prince Adam - trumpet, vocals
- Crash McLarson! - bass guitar, vocals
- Catboy! - trumpet, vocals
- The Baron von Tito! - drums
- Ultra Kyu - guitar, vocals
