= GOGO13 =

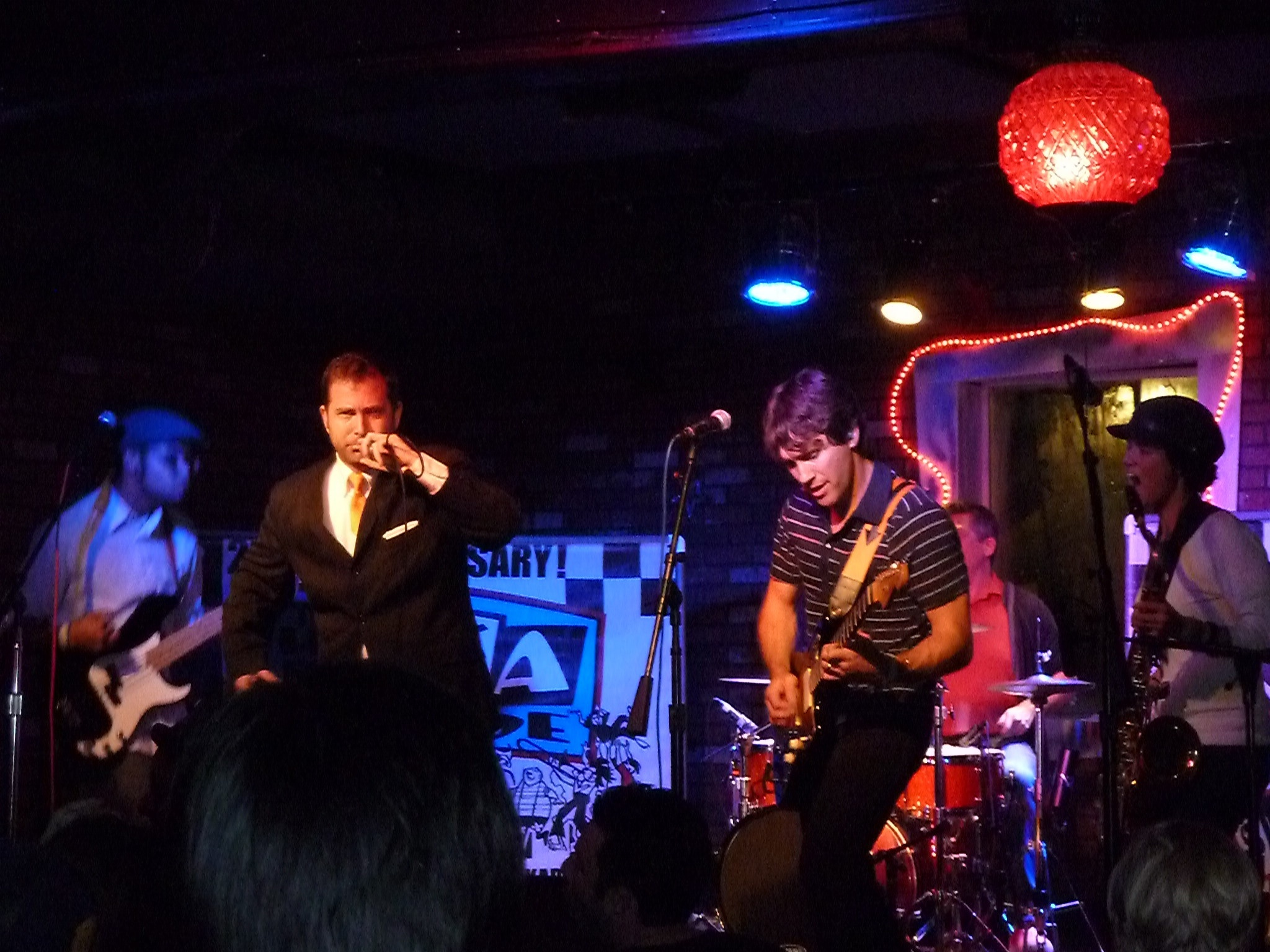
- GOGO13 in San Francisco in 2011.

Background information
- Origin: St. George, Utah; Huntington Beach, California
- Genres: Ska
- Years active: 1993-1994, 2001-present
- Labels: Horchata, Free Agent
- Website: www.gogo13.com

GOGO13 is an American ska band formed in 1993 by singer and artist Parker Jacobs and currently based out of Huntington Beach, California.

Originally formed in St. George, Utah, the first incarnation of GOGO13 lasted for just under a year, yet ultimately helped pioneer a thriving ska scene in Utah during the mid-1990s. In 2001, following their rediscovery through their association with the popular Orange County band The Aquabats, GOGO13 permanently reunited and continue to play shows throughout the southwestern region. The band released their first studio album I Like It! in April 2012.

== History ==
=== 1993-1994: original incarnation ===
GOGO13 was formed in late 1993 by singer Parker Jacobs and his brother Tyler, two former child actors who had recently relocated back to Utah from southern California. Billed as "Southern Utah's first ska band", GOGO13 were credited for helping build a flourishing ska scene in Utah during the first half of the 1990s alongside such regionally successful bands as Swim Herschel Swim, Stretch Armstrong and Model Citizen. Musically, GOGO13 were heavily influenced by the 2 Tone and Mod revival scenes of the late 1970s and early 1980s, in particular the bands Madness and Bad Manners, whose irreverent sense of humor was similarly adopted by the band: deriving their name from the Japanese spy manga Golgo 13, GOGO13 boasted a spy-themed aesthetic which manifested itself in such stage theatrics as cap gun fights and other assorted antics.

The first incarnation of GOGO13 lasted for less than a year, up until several factors - including Tyler Jacobs' relocation to Northern Utah and the impending missions of Parker Jacobs and co-vocalist Dustin "Skip" Blad - prompted an early disbandment. The band played their final shows in September 1994 with Reel Big Fish and Mealticket, concluding with a performance on a tennis court which ended with Parker Jacobs humorously firing each of the band members. Just prior to their break-up, GOGO13 had recorded a seven-track EP, Toy Guns & Pixy Stix, which was ultimately never released due to the band's dissatisfaction with the production, though two of its tracks, "Idiot Box" and "Espionage", would later appear on the compilation album Rice Capades in 2001.

Following the end of his mission, Parker Jacobs moved back to California where he became involved with his brother Christian's then up-and-coming band The Aquabats, providing artwork for their albums and merchandise as well as various creative and musical ideas, running their official fan club and, most notably, playing the role of "The Professor" in the band's live shows and music videos. In the earliest years of the band, The Aquabats regularly played older GOGO13 songs, the most notable of which being "Idiot Box", which was recorded for their 1996 album The Return of The Aquabats and again for their 1997 follow-up The Fury of The Aquabats!.

=== 2001-present: second incarnation ===
In 2001, a new version of GOGO13 featuring Parker and Tyler Jacobs as the only original members reunited for a one-off show in Orange County promoting the release of Rice Capades. The following year, GOGO13 decided to officially reunite, spending the next several years playing sporadic shows throughout Southern California and recording numerous demos with a frequently rotating line-up, with Parker Jacobs as the sole constant member. While the band primarily play smaller ska shows, GOGO13 have also performed to wider audiences as a regular opening act for The Aquabats and such 1990s ska bands as Five Iron Frenzy and My Superhero, as well as part of the 2010 and 2012 Warped Tour and at the 2013 Orange County Music Awards. In 2008, Jacobs was also interviewed for The Up Beat, a documentary film chronicling the Utah ska scene of the 1990s.

GOGO13 may be currently best known for their musical contributions to Yo Gabba Gabba!, namely the original song "Pick It Up", featuring Alex Désert of Hepcat, which was featured in an animated short designed by Jacobs. The short won the award for "Excellence in Humor" at the 2008 ASIFA-East Animation Festival, while the song remains a staple of GOGO13's live shows, eventually appearing several years later on the Gabba CD Music Is...Awesome!, Vol. 3 soundtrack ("at last", an enthusiastic review on AllMusic wrote). On April 13, 2012, nearly 20 years after their original formation, GOGO13 independently produced and released their debut studio LP, I Like It!, featuring both new and old songs spanning the band's entire career. I Like It! was released to positive critical reviews, with the OC Weekly calling GOGO13 "OC's most underrated ska band".

== Band members ==
=== Original line-up ===
- Parker Jacobs - vocals
- Dustin "Skip" Blad - vocals, harmonica
- Tyler Jacobs - keyboards
- Creed Watkins - lead guitar
- Jeff Dotson - rhythm guitar
- Mel aka Brad Gentry - bass
- Ben Crosby - drums
- Joe Gibson - bari saxophone
- Abe McCormick- trumpet
- Justin Vaden - tenor saxophone

=== Current line-up ===
- Parka AKA (Parker Jacobs) - vocals, ukulele
- Secret Agent Johnny Spleen (Johnny Beutler) - lead guitar
- Brian Gilmore - bass
- Jeffrey "Dex" McFerson - organ, trombone
- PK Deeeluxe (Paul Kloepfer) - drums
- Scout (Erin Ashley) - saxophone

Former members (2001–present)

- Ben Action (Ben Bergeson) - guitar
- Cris Crumpet (Stiles) - trumpet
- The Grik (Garrick Hargrove) - bass
- Tyler Jacobs - vocals, melodica
- Keith Chaos (Hetrick) - trumpet
- Duke Regal (Ryan Blake) - organ
- Gata Hari (Raechel Bunnell) - organ

== Discography ==
Studio albums

Year	Title	Label
2012	I Like It!	Free Agent Records

EPs

- Toy Guns & Pixy Stix (1994) (unreleased)
- It's a Trap! (2002)
- The Fluke Sessions (2004)

1. "Big Red Fluke"
2. "El Otro Comienzo" (acoustic)

- RAAAAWR!! (2005)

1. "Free Agent"
2. "Monster"

7" singles

- "¡Es Ploded!" / "Cereal" (2009)

Demos

- Demotape O' Fun (1994)
- The Jets Demos (1994)
- House Ape (2002)

1. "House Ape"
2. "Big Red Cup"
3. "El Otro Comienzo"

=== Videography ===
- The Bluebeat Lounge Goes O.C. (2005)

DVD release of a live concert hosted by Los Angeles ska music showcase The Bluebeat Lounge, also featuring material from the bands Go Jimmy Go, La Banda Skalavera and Chris Murray. Includes live performances of "Free Agent", "Big Red Cup", "Monster" and "House Ape".

- "Down in a Barrel" (2010)

Music video for a song which would eventually appear on I Like It!. Directed by Tyler Jacobs and shot on location in Huntington Beach, California.

=== Compilation appearances ===
- Rice Capades (2001)

A sampler compilation of The Aquabats' self-operated Horchata Records label, featuring the recordings of "Idiot Box" and "Espionage" from the ill-fated Toy Guns & Pixy Stix EP.

- Yo Gabba Gabba!: Music is...Awesome!, Vol. 3 (2011)

Soundtrack compilation featuring the original recording of "Pick It Up" with Alex Désert of Hepcat.
