= The Return of The Aquabats =

The Return of the Aquabats

Studio album by The Aquabats
- Released: December 8, 1995
- Recorded: Summer 1995
- Genre: Ska
- Length: 36:24
- Label: Horchata; Fearless (re-issue)
- Producer: The Aquabats, Jim Barnes

The Aquabats chronology
Bat Boy Demo Tape (1995)	The Return of the Aquabats (1995)	The Fury of The Aquabats! (1997)

The Return of the Aquabats is the debut studio album by American band The Aquabats, independently released on Horchata Records in December 1995, and subsequently re-issued by Fearless Records.

== Overview ==
The Return of the Aquabats firmly establishes the comedy-oriented songwriting the Aquabats would become known for, covering such familiar territory as pop culture satire, fantasy and science fiction-influenced narratives, and self-referential songs centered on the band's superhero aesthetic. Musically, however, The Return differs from the rest of the band's discography by being their most overtly ska-based, featuring some of the surf music influences which characterized their early material but little of the new wave or punk rock elements which would eventually become the core of the band's sound on future releases.

The Aquabats independently released The Return on their own record label Horchata Records in December 1995, pressing and selling the CDs themselves. As the band's local notoriety began to rise with the commercial resurgence of ska music, they eventually sold an impressive 24,000 copies without any distribution. By the end of the 1990s, The Return eventually fell out of print, and the album was re-issued and distributed by Fearless Records in 2002.

The Return was the only Aquabats album to feature original guitarist Ben the Brain (Ben Bergeson), keyboardist Nacho (Chad Parkin) and drummer Rod the Hammer (Rod Arellano), all of whom would leave the band prior to the recording of their next album.

At the 2006 San Diego Aquacadet Summit, the Aquabat's semi-annual fan club gathering, Adam Deibert joined the band's current line-up to perform the album in its entirety in celebration of its tenth anniversary.

== Track listing ==
All tracks written by the Aquabats, except where noted otherwise.

No.	Title	Length
1.	"Playdough"	3:40
2.	"Martian Girl"	3:45
3.	"Ska Robot Army"	2:11
4.	"Idiot Box" (Creed Watkins, Parker Jacobs)	2:11
5.	"Pinch and Roll"	4:20
6.	"Tarantula"	3:42
7.	"Marshmallow Man"	2:58
8.	"Aquabat March"	3:14
9.	"CD Repo Man"	3:17
10.	"It's Crazy, Man!"	5:06

=== Alternate and previous versions ===
- Earlier versions of tracks 1, 2, 5, 8 and 9 first appeared on the 1994 debut tape The Revenge of the Midget Punchers.
- Earlier versions of tracks 8 and 10 originally appeared on the 1995 demo Bat Boy.
- Tracks 1, 2 and 4 were re-recorded for the Aquabats' 1997 album The Fury of The Aquabats!.

== Personnel ==
=== The Aquabats ===
- The Caped Commander – vocals
- Chain Saw - guitar
- The Brain (Ben Bergeson) - guitar
- Crash McLarson – bass, backing vocals
- Roddy B. (Rod Arellano) – drums, backing vocals
- Nacho (Chad Parkin) - keyboards
- Cat Boy – trumpet, backing vocals
- Prince A. - trumpet

=== Additional musicians ===
- Ben Schultz – alto saxophone
- John Pantle – trombone
- Jim Barnes - trumpet solo on "CD Repo Man"
- Ultra Kyu - credited as "The 9the Man"
