= Idiot box =

Idiot box is slang for a television. It may refer to:

- The Idiot Box (TV series), a 1990 sketch comedy show on MTV starring Alex Winter
- Idiot Box (webcomic), by Matt Bors
- Idiot Box (film), an Australian movie starring Ben Mendelsohn and Jeremy Sims
- "Idiot Box" (Incubus song), from the 1997 album S.C.I.E.N.C.E. by Incubus
- "Idiot Box" (The Damned song), a song by The Damned on their 1977 album Music for Pleasure
- "Idiot Box", a song by GOGO13 from the 2001 compilation album Rice Capades
  - Covered by The Aquabats on their albums The Return of The Aquabats (1996) and The Fury of The Aquabats! (1997)
- "Idiot Box" (SpongeBob SquarePants), an episode of SpongeBob SquarePants
- "The Idiot Box", a song from the album The Art of Balance by Shadows Fall
