= Kooky Spooky...In Stereo =

Kooky Spooky...In Stereo!

Studio album by The Aquabats
- Released: August 21, 2020
- Recorded: June–July 2019
- Studios: Maple Studios, Orange County, California
- Genres: Pop punk, new wave, ska punk, comedy rock
- Length: 32:39
- Label: Gloopy Records
- Producer: Cameron Webb

The Aquabats chronology
| The Fury of the Aquabats! Live at the Fonda! (2020) | Kooky Spooky...In Stereo! (2020) | Finally! (2024) |

Singles from Kooky Spooky...In Stereo!
- 1. "Skeleton Inside!" Released: October 25, 2019; 2. "Pajamazon!" Released: April 10, 2020; 3. "No One Wants to Party!" Released: May 1, 2020; 4. "Karate Body!" Released: July 31, 2020

Kooky Spooky...In Stereo! is the sixth studio album and the ninth album overall by American band The Aquabats, released on August 21, 2020.

== Overview ==
Kooky Spooky follows much in the same guitar and synthesizer-driven rock and new wave-influenced musical direction The Aquabats first established on 2005's Charge!! and continued to develop on 2011's Hi-Five Soup!, incorporating various elements of punk rock, ska and synthpop in a mix which ReadJunk described overall as ranging from "Devo-esque electronica rock and 60s sounding synth rock to tongue-in-cheek hip hop and punk rock".

Excluding compilations and soundtracks, Kooky Spooky is the first album in The Aquabats' history not to feature any line-up changes from the band's previous studio album, retaining the same core five-piece line-up which recorded 2011's Hi-Five Soup!. Most significantly, the song "Pajamazon!" features former trumpeters Boyd Terry (Catboy) and Adam Deibert (Prince Adam), both of whom departed from the band in 2002 and 2004, respectively. As such, "Pajamazon!" marks the first Aquabats song to feature a horn section or any brass or woodwind instrument since the release of the 2000 compilation Myths, Legends and Other Amazing Adventures, Vol. 2

== Production history ==
Shortly after the release of The Aquabats' fifth studio album Hi-Five Soup! in January 2011, the band's independently produced television pilot The Aquabats! Super Show! was picked up as a series by American cable channel The Hub. Though lead singer Christian Jacobs (The MC Bat Commander) would frequently mention intentions to eventually record another studio album, The Aquabats spent most of the 2010s primarily focusing on production of the series and its soundtrack.

In July 2018, The Aquabats launched a high-profile Kickstarter campaign aimed at helping independently finance additional episodes of The Aquabats! Super Show!, money which would also help fund the production of at least three new albums. When the original Kickstarter failed to meet its $1.1 million goal, the campaign was relaunched with a new goal of $100,000 to help produce new Super Show! "mini-episodes" and a sixth studio album. The new campaign ultimately raised over $900,000, surpassing several stretch goals which included two new studio albums, among other releases.

Recording for The Aquabats' new studio album began on June 4, 2019, at Maple Studios in Orange County, California. Progress on the album was sporadically updated throughout the year by The Aquabats' individual members on their respective social accounts; guitarist Ian Fowles (Eaglebones Falconhawk) revealed on Instagram that the guitar tracks had been completed by June 22. On October 25, The Aquabats premiered "Skeleton Inside!", the first single from their then-untitled studio album on their official YouTube channel, though did not confirm a release date beyond "later this year".

In a February 2020 press release for a summer tour with Reel Big Fish, The Aquabats revealed the title for their upcoming album, Kooky Spooky...In Stereo, though again did not confirm a release date. On April 10, 2020, during the coronavirus pandemic which necessitated mass self-quarantining and social distancing, The Aquabats released the coincidentally relevant couch potato-themed single "Pajamazon!", which was followed by the release of a music video on April 25, The Aquabats' first new music video since "Fashion Zombies!" in 2005. A third single, "No One Wants to Party!", was released on May 1.

Kooky Spooky's original release date was set for June 20, 2020, on all digital platforms, with an indefinitely postponed physical release date in wake of coronavirus-related interruptions in manufacturing. On June 12, within the midst of the international George Floyd protests which prompted many artists to delay new releases and instead draw attention to anti-racist causes, The Aquabats announced they would push back Kooky Spooky's release date to August 21, writing in posts to their social media accounts that "There will always be time for goofy, rowdy rock...but it doesn't feel right to us to be loud and self-promoting at this moment in time. We'd rather give space to people who are saying they need to be heard", encouraging open discussion about race and racism and linking to resources from the National Museum of African American History and Culture. The album's fourth single, "Karate Body!", was also postponed from its planned June 5 release date, eventually being released on July 31.

== Reception ==
While Kooky Spooky's independent release flew under the radar of most major music publications, critical response from the punk and alternative music scene was generally positive. Punk rock website That's Good Enough for Me called the album a "fun romp through the creative minds" of the band, commenting "the fun here is infectious" and delivering particular praise on "Pajamazon!" as "the most pure anthem of the quarantine era", while ReadJunk rated the album four out of five stars, describing it as one of The Aquabats' best and "most diverse sounding" albums and praising its offbeat lyrical content, noting "If you can’t have a good time listening to The Aquabats then you need to check yourself at the door".

== Track listing ==
Kooky Spooky...In Stereo track listing
| No. | Title | Writer(s) | Length |
|---|---|---|---|
| 1. | "Karate Body!" | The Aquabats, Matt Gorney | 3:03 |
| 2. | "No One Wants to Party!" | The Aquabats | 3:09 |
| 3. | "Skeleton Inside!" | The Aquabats, Matt Gorney | 4:23 |
| 4. | "Bed Head!" | The Aquabats, Nate Pyfer | 2:19 |
| 5. | "Aliens and Monsters!" | The Aquabats, Nate Pyfer | 3:02 |
| 6. | "The Walk Off!" | The Aquabats | 3:07 |
| 7. | "Dangerous Leon!" | The Aquabats | 2:39 |
| 8. | "Pajamazon!" | The Aquabats, Matt Gorney | 2:48 |
| 9. | "She's Gonna Live Forever!" | The Aquabats | 3:14 |
| 10. | "Sneak Attack!" | The Aquabats, Matt Gorney | 3:23 |
| 11. | "Karate Body Part 2!" | The Aquabats, Cameron Webb | 3:12 |

=== Track information ===
- "Karate Body Part 2!" is a 25-second reprise of "Karate Body", followed by a hidden track of a jam session after thirty seconds of silence. The album's packaging erroneously lists this as a 12th track entitled "???!".

== Personnel ==
The Aquabats

- The MC Bat Commander – vocals ("'Vocalist'")
- Crash McLarson – bass guitar ("Bassening")
- Eaglebones Falconhawk – guitar ("Mystic Picker")
- Jimmy the Robot – keyboards, saxophone ("Synth-hornics")
- Ricky Fitness – drums, percussion ("Drumcopter")

Additional musicians

- "Prince Adam" Deibert - horns on "Pajamazon!"
- Boyd "Catboy" Terry - horns on "Pajamazon!"
- Optimus Ryme (Matt Gorney) - guest vocals on "Skeleton Inside!"
- Larry Hastings - additional keys and vocals on tracks 3, 8-11
- Curtis Mathewson - modular synthesizer programming on "Aliens and Monsters!"

Production

- Produced, mixed and engineered by Cameron Webb
- Executive produced by Ivan Askwith and Jordan McArthur
- Mastered by Andrew Alekel at Bolskine Studios
- Design and layout by Parker Jacobs
- Photography by Jeff Butcher
