= Serious Awesomeness! =

Video by The Aquabats
- Released: November 18, 2003
- Recorded: 1995–2003
- Genre: Rock, ska punk, new wave, ska
- Length: Approx. 180 minutes
- Label: Fearless Records
- Producer: The Aquabats, Christian Jacobs, Scott Schultz

The Aquabats chronology
Serious Awesomeness! (2003)	Charge!! Special One-Year Anniversary Edition (2006)

Serious Awesomeness! is a two-disc live DVD by American band The Aquabats, released on Fearless Records on November 18, 2003.

== Overview ==
Disc one of Serious Awesomeness contains a full-length recording of a live concert performance by The Aquabats at The Glass House club in Pomona, California in February 2003, accompanied by two official music videos and a documentary featurette on the band. The second disc features numerous live clips spanning The Aquabats' career from 1994 to 2003.

=== Content listing ===
Seriously Awesome! Live in Pomona, Feb. 2003

1. "Giant Robot Birdhead"
2. "Lovers of Loving Love"
3. "Martian Girl"
4. "Pizza Day"
5. "Cat With 2 Heads"
6. "Danger Woman"
7. "Playdough"
8. "Red Sweater"
9. "Powdered Milk Man"
10. "Super Rad"
11. "Pool Party"
12. "The Story of Nothing"
- "A Band Called the Aquabats!: A Sweaty History of Radness!" documentary
- "Super Rad!" music video
- "CD Repo Man!" music video

Sweet Clips That Rip!

1. "Journey to the Stars" + Prince Adam's hand solo (Pomona, CA - 1998)
2. "Playdough" + El Demonico vs. The Aquabats (Hollywood, CA - 1996)
3. "Lovers of Loving Love" + The Aquabats vs. A Tough-Looking Street Gang (Hollywood, CA - 2002)
4. "Red Sweater" + Dr. Space Mummy's evil plan (Chicago, IL - 1998)
5. "Cat With 2 Heads" + Space Monster "M" and The Sandfleas (Hollywood, CA - 1998)
6. "Tarantula" + El Demonico and The Sandfleas (Pomona, CA - 1998)
7. "My Skateboard" + The Wrestling Roadies vs. The Aquabats (Hollywood, CA - 1996)
8. "Lotto Fever" + The Red Spider Gang (Los Angeles, CA - 2003)
9. "Giant Robot Birdhead" + The 'Big Cheese' vs. The World (Los Angeles, CA - 2001)
10. "Powdered Milk Man" + Cyclopsis vs. The Aquabats (Pomona, CA - 1998)
11. "Anti-Matter" + The Aquabats vs. The Cobnobbler (Hollywood, CA - 2002)
12. "Pool Party" + Dr. Space Mummy's robot (San Diego, CA - 2003)
13. "The Thing in the Bass Amp" + The Mysterious Q's wish (Chicago, IL - 1999)
14. "Super Rad" (Hollywood, CA - 1998)

== Reception ==
In a contemporary review, Scott Heisel of Punknews.org gave Serious Awesomeness! four stars out of five, saying that it "should hopefully revive interest in this band's waning popularity, as this DVD shows they still have relevance. More importantly, this band is goddamn funny live, and people need to know that. A worthy buy if you're a fan or if you're looking to discover the Aquabats for the first time – all of their bests songs are on here in one form or another, and the Bat Commander is in rare form in these concert pieces."

== Personnel ==
The Aquabats

Band line-up at the time of DVD release:

- The Bat Commander - vocals
- Crash McLarson - bass
- Prince Adam - trumpet, keyboards, guitar
- Chainsaw - guitar
- The Robot - saxophone, keyboards
- Ricky Fitness - drums
