= A Fighting Choice =

- Genre: Adventure; Biography; Drama; Family; Western
- Written by: Craig Buck
- Directed by: Ferdinand Fairfax
- Starring: Patrick Dempsey; Beau Bridges; Karen Valentine
- Music by: Brad Fiedel
- Country of origin: United States
- Original language: English

Production
- Producer: Nelle Nugent
- Cinematography: Robert E. Collins
- Editor: Stanford C. Allen
- Running time: 100 minutes
- Production company: Walt Disney Television

Original release
- Network: ABC
- Release: April 13, 1986

A Fighting Choice is a 1986 American made-for-television biographical drama film directed by Ferdinand Fairfax. Produced by Walt Disney Television, the film stars Patrick Dempsey as a teenager suffering from epilepsy. It originally aired April 13, 1986 as a presentation of The Disney Sunday Movie on ABC.

== Plot ==
16-year-old Kellin Taylor has epilepsy. He has not had a seizure in five months and is visiting the nation's most praised doctor. Due to his two-weekly visits to Dr. Tobin, he has been neglecting school work. This upsets his parents, who are disappointed considering the joy they experienced months earlier when they could enroll Kellin in a regular high school for the first time in his life. To better his grades, he is assigned to a tutor student, Susie Fratelli, whom he immediately falls in love with. Despite his shyness, Susie takes a liking in him as well, and invites him to jog with her the next morning. All these new adjustments cause him to have another epileptic seizure at night. The next day, Susie is initially upset that he did not show up for jogging, until Kellin reluctantly informs her about his epilepsy. Susie is not scared off, like he suspected, and they grow even closer.

Dr. Tobin is worried about Kellin's seizure, realizing that the drugs have no effect on him anymore. He tells Kellin's father Thad that an experimental brain surgery could be the only solution, but Thad fears about its dangers and opposes to it. Kellin finds out about the possibility through a letter and gets mad at his parents for not having informed him. Unlike his parents, Kellin is interested in the operation, and continues proceedings without his parents' support. Topping this, he considers suing his parents for independence, which would enable him to decide for himself to have the operation.

When Thad and Meg find out that they are being sued. They contact an expert, who informs them that although the operation could stop the seizure, other seizures could make a way. Meanwhile, Kellin is advised by his attorney Virginia Hagan, to move out of the house during trial. The trial and its press attention tear up the family, prompting Kellin to listen to Virginia and move in with her, even though feeling guilty that all this affects his little brother Harvey, as well. The case causes Thad to be transferred from work, and Harvey feels ignored by his parents. Furthermore, Kellin starts to have second thoughts about surgery and has his first epileptic seizure in front of Susie.

At trial, Virginia calls for Eli Rhodes, a former epileptic patient who underwent surgery successfully. Kellin is inspired by his story and now wants to continue the operation. During the final stages of trial, he becomes intimate with Susie for the first time. Judge Rosenstiel decides to give consent to the operation. Even though Thad and Meg are disappointed with the outcome, they give up the personal war with their son and decide to support him during surgery. Surgery proves difficult and lasts for five hours, but a successful outcome is the result. Kellin awakes, surrounded by his family and girlfriend.

== Cast ==
- Patrick Dempsey as Kellin Taylor
- Beau Bridges as Thad Taylor
- Karen Valentine as Meg Taylor
- Danielle von Zerneck as Susie Fratelli
- Frances Lee McCain as Virginia Hagan
- Lawrence Pressman as Dr. Tobin
- Allan Arbus as Dr. Andreas Hellman
- Alice Hirson as Judge Rosenstiel
- Parker Jacobs as Harvey 'Boss' Taylor
- Allen Williams as Dan Goodman
- Philip Linton as Eli Rhodes
- Robin Thomas as Dr. Gardner
- Charles Lanyer as Dr. Leonard Faraday
