= My Superhero =

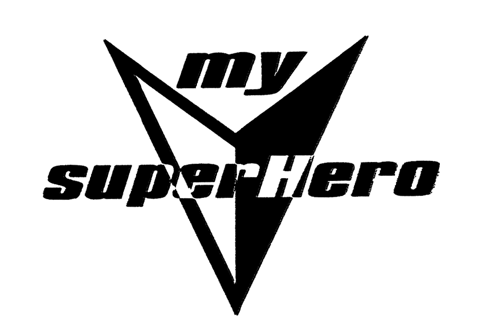

Background information
- Origin: Anaheim, CA United States
- Genres: Ska punk, third wave ska, pop punk
- Years active: 1994–2003, 2011
- Labels: Sick Little Monkey, Risk, Vegas
- Website: http://www.my-superhero.com

My Superhero was an American ska punk band formed in Anaheim, California, who were originally active from 1994 to 2003.

== Biography ==
My Superhero formed in 1994 and quickly released their debut album entitled SKAteboard Music in 1995 under their own independent label Sick Little Monkey Music. In 1997, the band released their most successful album, Solid State 14, which received positive reviews from such prestigious publications such as The Los Angeles Times and AllMusic, the latter having been quoted as saying "[i]t's unusual to find a debut effort from a punk-ska band that sounds this good".

In 1998, My Superhero re-recorded SKAteboard Music, releasing it on Vegas Records, before signing to Risk Records to re-release Solid State 14, which helped them find success on the national commercial radio charts. The following year, the band worked with producer Thom Wilson to release their third album entitled Station One under Risk Records. They spent the next 2 years touring nationally alongside bands including Reel Big Fish, The Aquabats, The Hippos, Fenix TX and Frenzal Rhomb, as well as touring as part of the 1999 and 2000 Warped Tour. My Superhero received regular exposure on KUCI's pioneering Ska Parade radio show, managing to tie the record held by Long Beach's One Eye Open for the most on-air live performances.

In April 2000, the band attracted minor controversy through an article published by the OC Weekly which revealed numerous homophobic comments frontman Brian Gilmore had posted on My Superhero's own eGroups message board, among them his beliefs that gay men were pedophiles and several uses of the word "fag". When pressed for comment, the band's manager initially stated that "the real haters" were people who took issue with Gilmore's comments, claiming "that's also hatred on their part", though later called the event "unfortunate" and added that Gilmore felt "apologetic".

In 2000, My Superhero attempted to reorganize the band and play as a power pop trio. In 2002, they recruited a fourth member and recorded their final release, the Send Gas EP. The group quietly disbanded after front man Brian Gilmore got married. My Superhero's final performance was at Gilmore's wedding in 2004.

=== Reunion shows and beyond ===
On September 17, 2011, the four original members of My Superhero played a reunion show at The Glasshouse in Pomona, California, headlining a concert organized by Tazy Phyllipz and the Ska Parade. A while later on November 5, the band again reunited at The Glasshouse to open for The Aquabats, the first time the two groups have played together since 1998.

=== Pick It Up- Ska in the 90's ===
In April 2018 My Superhero member Mike Berault signed on to Executive Produce the documentary Pick It Up!- Ska in the'90s "I felt that our story had to be told, The story of all these great bands that came up in the 90's who had each other, and a DIY ethos that lead ultimately to global success". Mike went on to promote several screenings of the film in San Diego and Long Beach, California.

== Discography ==
- SKAteboard Music (1995) (1999, re-recorded)
- Solid State 14 (1997) (1998, remastered)
- Station One (1999)
- Send Gas EP (1999)

== Band members ==
- Brian Gilmore - vocals, guitar, bass (1994–2003, 2011)
- Chris Clawson - drums (1994–2003)
- Huey Huynh - guitar (1994–2003, 2011)
- Mike Berault - keyboards, accordion (1994–1999, 2003, 2011)
- Dan Park - bass (1994–1998, 2011)
- James Salomone - bass (1999)
- Ean Brown - guitar (2001–2003)
- Chris Bivens - drums (1999-2000)
- Tim Bivens - drums (2011)
