= Charles Gray (musician) =

American musician

- Gray's professional headshot, taken 2017.

Background information
- Also known as: Ultra Kyu; The Mysterious Kyu
- Born: Charles Wallace Gray; October 26, 1976 (age 49); Huntington Beach, California
- Genres: Ska, Rock music, Opera
- Occupation: Musician
- Instruments: Guitar, Violin
- Years active: 1993–present

Charles Wallace Gray (born October 26, 1976) is an American musician, best known for his tenure as the former guitarist for the Orange County rock band The Aquabats, of which he served as a member from 1997 to 1999 under the stage name of Ultra Kyu and later The Mysterious Kyu (pronounced as the letter Q).

Gray was the guitarist on The Aquabats 1995 debut album The Return of the Aquabats, and on their subsequent release, 1997's The Fury of the Aquabats!. Gray remained a member of The Aquabats until his departure in 1999, Gray currently is pursuing a career in opera in New York.

== Biography ==
Charles Gray was born and raised in Huntington Beach, California in 1976, the youngest of 2 other siblings

Gray went to Huntington Beach High School alongside fellow band members, Adam Deibert and Courtney Pollock, who all joined the band "The Goodwin Club" afterwards. Gray played the guitar for the band, frequently opening for The Aquabats, until 1995, when they disbanded after some members left for college.

Not too long after, Gray first recorded with The Aquabats on their first album, The Return of the Aquabats, playing additional guitar. Although he was not credited for such. Later, in early 1997, Gray joined The Aquabats, playing guitar alongside Courtney Pollock, under the stage name "Ultra Kyu", or alternatively "The Mysterious Kyu". Soon after, he recorded his first album with the band, The Fury of the Aquabats!, playing additional guitar and other instruments. Gray started to be one of the core members of the band, appearing in both TV pilots and subsequently playing on another album with them, The Aquabats vs. the Floating Eye of Death!.

During the production of the album, due to tensions between the band and their producer at the time, Thom Wilson, Gray abruptly quit the band. Shortly after, Gray went on to join the band Dig Bunnee in Early 1999, a side project by Adam Deibert along with fellow colleagues, Corey Pollock who played guitar, and Gabe Palmer who was on drums. All four sharing relations to The Aquabats. Then not too long after, Gray also joined the band Bikeride alongside fellow Aquabats member Adam Deibert, being a multi-instrumentalist, notably playing guitar and bass.

In 2002 Gray left Bikeride. He later moved to Brooklyn, New York in 2006, where he pursued a career in opera in 2011 as a baritone. The first opera that he was involved in was the role of Plagio with Amore Opera in 2011 in Saverio Mercadante’s I due Figaro. Since then he has played in many other operas, most notably being involved with producer David Serero in an Off-Broadway performance of Don Giovanni at the Center for Jewish History in New York City in 2018, singing the role of the servant Leporello.

Gray continues to do opera to the present day, with him especially being involved with Amore Opera, a non-profit all volunteer company in New York City that is dedicated to producing high-quality operas and getting people of all ages involved in their productions.

Gray currently lives a quiet life in Williamsburg, Brooklyn.

== Discography ==
=== The Goodwin Club ===
- Soda/Join the Club (2015) - guitar

=== The Aquabats ===
- The Fury of the Aquabats! (1997) – electric and acoustic guitars, finger cymbals, piano, banjo, EBow, violin, sitar, Mellotron, vocals, Moog synthesizer
- The Aquabats vs. the Floating Eye of Death! (1999) – guitar
- Myths, Legends and Other Amazing Adventures, Vol. 2 (2000) – guitar

=== Bikeride ===
- Summer Winners / Summer Losers (2000) - guitar, programming, theremin
- Morning Macumba (2002) - guitar
