= Mealticket =

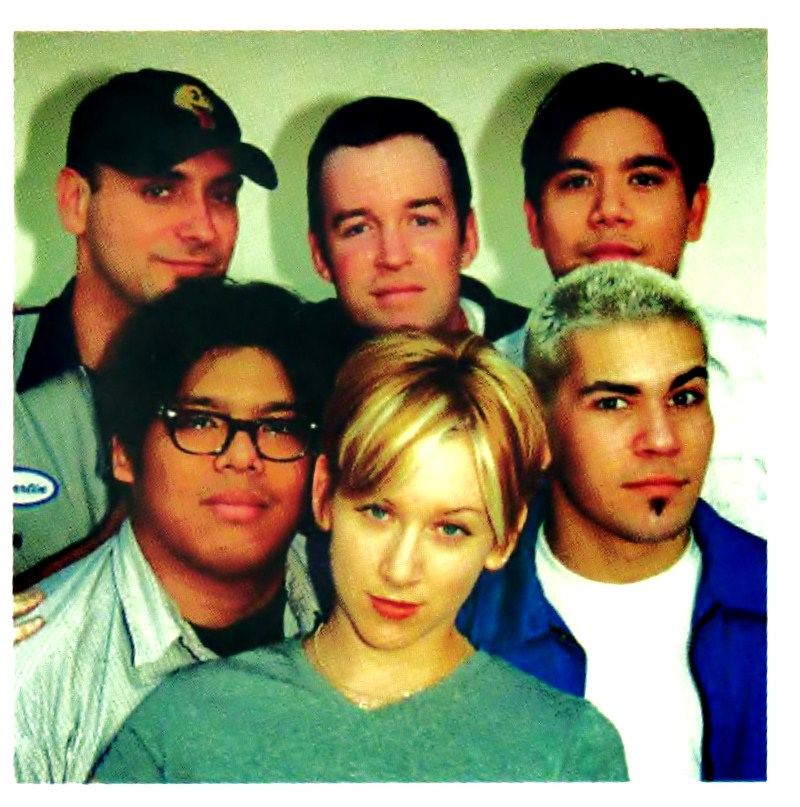
- Spring 1997 - Clockwise from top: Dennis Leipert, Jim Cushnie, David Ferreria, Ricky Estrada, Genai Canale, Richard Ferreria

Background information
- Origin: Los Angeles, California, U.S.
- Genres: Ska punk
- Years active: 1991–1997
- Labels: Pork n Beans; Asian Man
- Past members: Genai Canale; Ricky Estrada; David Ferreria; Dennis Leipert; Richard Ferreria; Jim Cushnie; Winnie Lee; Bill Meadows; Edwin Portillo; Chris Taylor; Carlos de la Garza; Pat Phelan; Alphie Larreiu; Derrick Conyers

Mealticket was an American ska punk band, formed in the San Fernando Valley area of Southern California, United States, in late 1991. Although part of the larger third wave ska revival, Mealticket offered a unique sound thanks to its serious musicianship, complex compositions, and silky, jazz influenced female vocals.

== History ==
The band formed in 1991 in Van Nuys, California and consisted of members of the Van Nuys High School marching band. The members of the band in 1991 were Alfie Larreau (saxophone and vocals), Edwin Portillo (bass guitar) Bill Meadows (guitar), Richard Ferreria (Trombone), Derrick Conyers (Trumpet), Chris Taylor (Drums) and David Ferreria (keyboards and guitar).

After playing their first gig at the Natural Fudge Cafe in Los Angeles in 1991, the line-up went through some shifts as Edwin and Alfie left the band and David switched to bass.The band went through a number of singers before the band was joined by Genai Canale in 1992. The band often played shows at the Cobalt Cafe on Sherman Way in Canoga Park.

Mealticket began playing the Orange County ska scene regularly in 1994. That same year they released their debut CD Misconceptions. Influenced by the American punk rock scene, the band decided to release the album DIY on their own label "Pork 'n Beans Records." Soon thereafter, the CD became a hit among the rapidly growing national ska scene.

In 1995, Mealticket went through another lineup change as Derrick and Chris left the band. They were replaced by Jim Cushnie on saxophone and Carlos De La Garza (formerly from the OC band Suburban Rhythm) on drums on the interim. Mealticket's next permanent drummer, Dennis Leipert, joined shortly thereafter. This new lineup recorded and released the second Mealticket CD 13 Apologies in 1996.

In 1996, Mealticket changed guitar players. The new guitar player, Ricky Estrada, recorded the last Mealticket release Lisa Marie. Unlike the previous two releases, Lisa Marie was released by Asian Man Records.

The band's relationship with Asian Man Records also yielded a Japanese release Superpositive, a retrospective of the band's earlier releases. It was to be the band's last release. Mealticket disbanded in 1997 amicably.

== Discography ==
=== Studio albums ===
Year	Title	Label
1994	Misconceptions	Pork n Beans Records
1996	13 Apologies	Pork n Beans Records
1998	Super Positive	Tachyon Records (Japanese Import)

=== EP's / 7" vinyl releases ===
Year	Title	Label	Tracks
1993	Appetizers - EP	Pork n Beans Records	Side A: "Looking Glass"/"Back Later"/"Defunct"/"Brass Man"; Side B: "Bus Driver"/"Her"/"98"/"Mealticket"
1997	Lisa Marie - 7"	Asian Man Records	Side A: "Lisa Marie"; Side B: "Picture This"/"Parachute"

=== Compilations ===
Year	Title	Track
1994	Blackpool Skampilation Vol II	"Brass Man" (live)
1994	We Don't Skare (French Import)	"Looking Glass"
1994	Step to it: Best of Ska Parade	"Brass Man"
1995	Misfits of Ska	"Neanderthal"
1995	Generic Skaca	"Stale"
1996	Salad Bowl Theory	"Bust of Instinct"
1997	California Ska-Quake, Vol. 2: The Aftershock	"Bliss"
1997	Punk Goes Ska	"No Message Here"
1997	Girls Go Ska	"Worried ABout You"
1997	Ska Down Her Way	"Super-Positive"
1997	Disc Makers Annual Top SoCal Acts	"Better Half"
1997	Black, White & Red All Over - (Video Comp)	"Live Performance"
1998	Punk Trash (Japanese Import)	"Lisa Marie"

== Pushover ==
Members of Mealticket went on to form the basis of Pushover. This band was also signed to Asian Man Records and release two albums.
