= Parker Jacobs =

Actor; musician; television art director

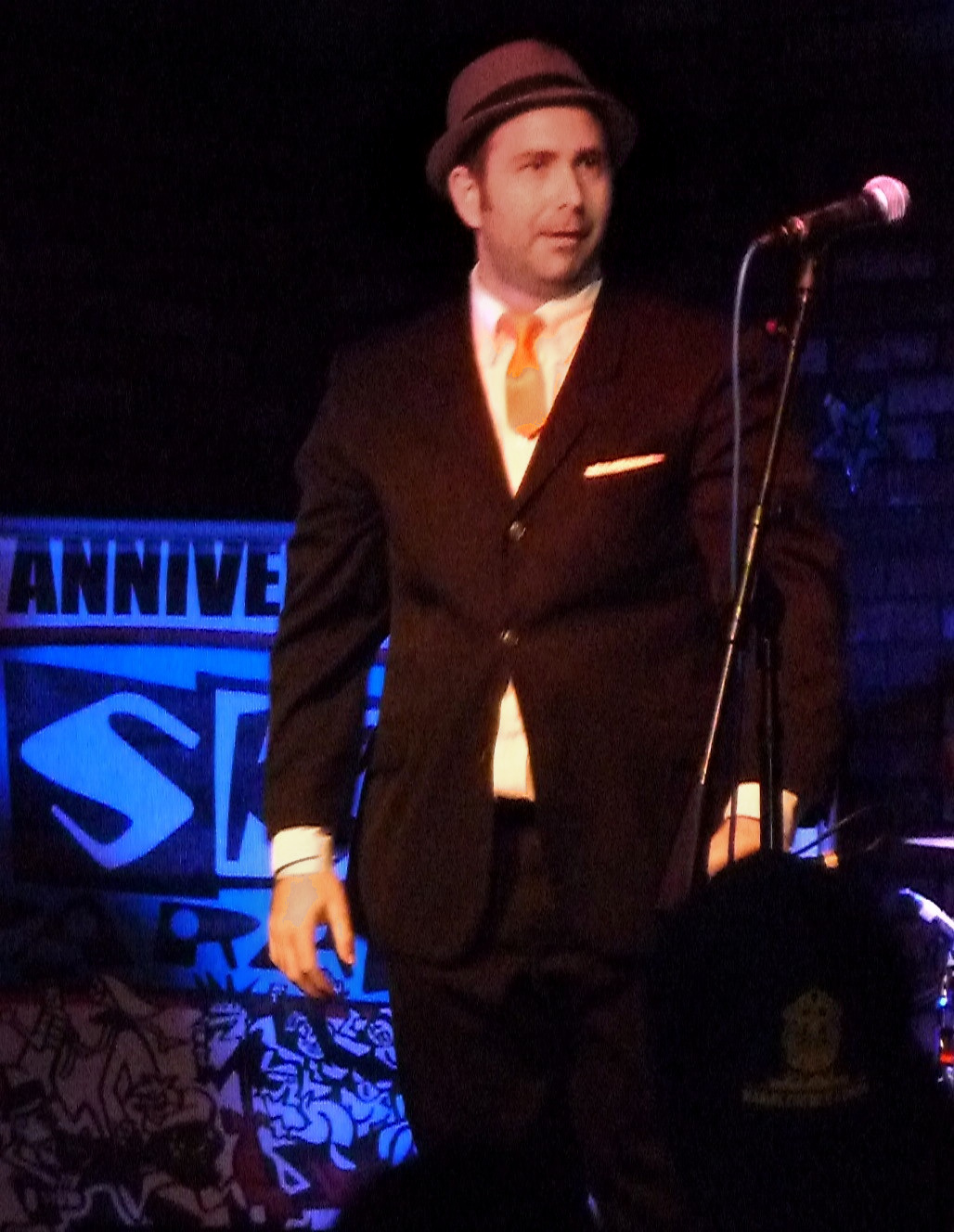

Background information
- Born: Parker LeGrand Jacobs; July 17, 1975 (age 51); Ogden, Utah, U.S.
- Instruments: Vocals, ukulele
- Years active: 1982–present

Parker LeGrand Jacobs (born July 17, 1975) is an American artist, musician, author and actor. He is known for his work as an art director on the children's television series Yo Gabba Gabba!, for which he has been nominated for four Daytime Emmy Awards, as well as for his involvement with the Californian bands GOGO13, The Aquabats and The Sandfleas.

== Biography ==
=== Early life ===
Parker LeGrand Jacobs was born in Ogden, Utah in 1975, the third child born into a LDS family. His middle name is in honor of his great-grandfather, prominent Latter-day Saint leader LeGrand Richards. Following his family's relocation to California in 1976, Jacobs – like his older siblings Christian and Rachel and younger brother Tyler – worked as a child actor, appearing in numerous commercials and television shows in his preadolescence. His most notable acting work included a starring role on the sitcom The Cavanaughs, in which he appeared in every episode during the series' run from 1986 to 1989, and as the recurring character "Purdle the Turtle" on The Wonder Years. Jacobs retired from show business in 1991, and shortly thereafter moved from California to St. George, Utah with family members.

While living in St. George, Jacobs formed the ska band GOGO13 with his brother Tyler in 1993, where he assumed the role of co-lead singer and songwriter. Though GOGO13 became a notable local success, the original incarnation of the band lasted just under a year until Jacobs left Utah in 1994 to serve his mission for the LDS Church, spending two years in West Virginia. Upon his return, he moved back to California and became involved with his brother Christian's then-up-and-coming band The Aquabats, providing artwork for their logos, albums and merchandise, as well as contributing lyrics, various creative ideas and running their fan club. Most visibly, however, Jacobs played the role of "The Professor" in The Aquabats' music videos and stage shows, taking part in the band's onstage skits and occasionally supplying backing vocals. Additionally, under the stage name "Mel", Jacobs was the lead vocalist for The Sandfleas, The Aquabats' costumed surf-punk side project, and recorded an EP with them in 1999. Jacobs retired from The Aquabats in the early 2000s, though sporadically continues to design posters and merchandise for the band, and occasionally appears as The Professor in concerts.

=== Recent activities ===
Jacobs joined Paul Frank Industries as an artist and graphic designer in 2000, eventually earning the title of Senior Design Director. In addition to designing the company's products, Jacobs was notable for writing and illustrating the company's very first children's book, Only in Dreams: A Bedtime Story, featuring the Paul Frank mascot Julius the Monkey. In 2005, he briefly worked with Josh Agel, the artist better known as Shag, to help develop a clothing line which never came to fruition.

That same year, Jacobs helped contribute art design for an independently filmed pilot called Yo Gabba Gabba!, a children's television series being developed by his brother Christian and his creative partner Scott Schultz. In 2007, the series was picked up by Viacom's Nick Jr. Channel, prompting Jacobs to leave his job at Paul Frank to work full-time on the show. His various titles on Yo Gabba Gabba! have included character design, animation direction, set design, color styling, writing, composing, voiceovers, art direction and costume design, the latter two of which earned him three nominations for a Daytime Emmy Award. In the September 22, 2008 episode "Birthdays", Jacobs made an on-camera appearance in the "Cool Tricks" segment, showcasing his affinity for baking birthday cakes.

Jacobs served as a "creative consultant" for both seasons of The Aquabats' live-action television series The Aquabats! Super Show!, contributing ideas and bits of writing to each episode between his work as art director on Yo Gabba Gabba!. In 2012, Jacobs, alongside Christian Jacobs and Jon Berrett, created The Goon Holler Guidebook, a children's book about a Bigfoot and a wizard. Jacobs has expressed plans to pitch Goon Holler as a television series, and published the first of four children's books based on the concept, Welcome to Goon Holler, in November 2014.

Jacobs spent most of his career in Huntington Beach, California, but currently lives in Boise, Idaho with his foxy wife, author Jennifer "JSP" Jacobs. He has two daughters and four stepsons. Since April, 10 2008, Jacobs has posted a drawing every day online in a feature he calls #ThisIsYourDailyDoodle.

== Discography ==
=== As musician ===
GoGo13 (all as vocals, ukulele and artwork)

- Demotape O' Fun (1994)
- The Jets Demos (1994)
- Toy Guns & Pixy Stix EP (1994) (unreleased)
- It's a Trap! EP (2002)
- House Ape Demo (2002)
- The Fluke Sessions EP (2004)
- RAAAAWR!! EP (2005)
- ¡Es Ploded!/Cereal 7" single (2009)
- I Like It! LP (2012)
- Yo Gabba Gabba! Hey! LP (2017)
- GoGo13 Goes To Hollywood LP (2025)

The Aquabats!

- The Fury of The Aquabats! (1997) – backing vocals, album artwork, songwriting credit on "Idiot Box!"
- The Aquabats vs. the Floating Eye of Death! (1999) – backing vocals, album artwork
- Myths, Legends and Other Amazing Adventures, Vol. 2 (2000) – backing vocals, album artwork
- Finally! (2024) - backing vocals, album artwork

The Sandfleas

- Four Songs By Four Jerks (1999) – lead vocals, album artwork

Santa On A Panda

- Santa On A Panda (2020) – lead vocals, album artwork

Goon Holler

- Toobaloth of Goon Holler (Original Soundtrack) (2021) – lead vocals, album artwork

=== As artist ===
Parker Jacobs has provided cover artwork and/or illustrations for the following albums, not including the albums listed above:

- Mealticket – Misconceptions (1996)
- The Insyderz – Skalleluia! (1998)
- The Insyderz – Skalleluia Too! (1999)
- Digital Unicorn – Theirs Travel Began and Loaded the Dream (2001)
- The Insyderz – The Greatest and Rarest (2001)
- Lederhosen Lucil – Tales from the Pantry (2003)
- The Vandals – Internet Dating Superstuds (2003)
- Josh Wink – When a Banana Was Just a Banana (2009) + Remixed and Repeeled (2010)
- Yo Gabba Gabba! – Music Is...Awesome!, Vol. 3 (2011)
- Yo Gabba Gabba! – Music Is...Awesome!, Vol. 4 (2012)
- Lone Raspberry – Children Of The Horn (2012)
- Yo Gabba Gabba! – A Very Awesome Yo Gabba Gabba Christmas, (2024)

== Filmography ==
=== Acting ===
Year	Title	Role	Notes
1982	Scamps	Jinx	Unsold TV pilot
1983	Trapper John, M.D.	1st Boy	Episode: "Eternally Yours"
1983	Charles in Charge	Max Shrimner	Episode: "Friends & Lovers"
1983	E/R	Alan Turner	Episode: "Both Sides Now"
1985	The Jeffersons	Johnny	Episode: "Sayonara: Part 2"
1985	Simon & Simon	Little Boy	Episode: "The Third Eye"
1986	A Fighting Choice	Harvey Taylor	Made for TV movie
1986	My Town	Tug Wheeler	Made for TV movie
1986	Amazing Stories	John Willson	Episode: "Welcome to My Nightmare"
1986–1989	The Cavanaughs	John Cavanaugh	Series regular
1987	Valerie's Family: The Hogans	Nick Avery	Episode: "Liars and Other Strangers"
1988	My Sister Sam		Episode: "Grand Prize"
1988	The Wrong Guys	Kid Glen	Feature film
1989–1991	The Wonder Years	Purdle the Turtle	Recurring character
1998	The Aquabats!	The Professor	TV pilot
1999	The Aquabats! In Color!	Professor Monty Corndog	TV pilot
2003	Serious Awesomeness!	The Professor	
2008	Yo Gabba Gabba!	Himself	Episode: "Birthday" – segment: "Cool Tricks"
2008	The Up Beat: A Documentary on Utah Ska	Himself	Documentary film

=== Production ===
Year	Title	Role
1999	The Aquabats! In Color!	Graphics
2007–present	Yo Gabba Gabba!	Art director, character design, animation, composing
2012–2014	The Aquabats! Super Show!	Creative consultant

== Bibliography ==
Year	Title	Role
March 26, 2008	Only in Dreams: A Bedtime Story	Author and illustrator
October 1, 2012	The Goon Holler Guidebook	Illustrator; co-authored with Christian Jacobs and Jon Berrett
January 1, 2013	Super Gabba Friends!	Illustrator; adapted by Tina Gallo
November 18, 2014	Welcome to Goon Holler	Illustrator; co-authored with Christian Jacobs
June 2, 2015	Goon Holler: Goon Fishin'	Illustrator; co-authored with Christian Jacobs
March 1, 2019	Ranger Rick's Storybook: Favorite Nature Tales from Ranger Rick Magazine	Illustrator
April 20, 2021	Toobaloth of Goon Holler	Author and Illustrator

== Accolades ==
Year	Nominee / work	Award	Result
2008	Daytime Emmy	Outstanding Achievement in Costume Design/Styling	Nominated
2009	Daytime Emmy	Outstanding Achievement in Costume Design/Styling	Nominated
2011	Daytime Emmy	Outstanding Achievement in Art Direction/Set Decoration/Scenic Design	Nominated
2012	Daytime Emmy	Outstanding Achievement in Costume Design/Styling	Nominated
2016	Daytime Emmy	Outstanding Achievement in Costume Design/Styling	Nominated
2026	Children's & Family Emmy Award	Outstanding Costume Design / Styling	Nominated
