= The Fury of The Aquabats! =

The Fury of the Aquabats!

Studio album by The Aquabats
- Released: October 28, 1997
- Recorded: 1997
- Genre: Ska; ska punk; surf rock
- Length: 51:16
- Label: Goldenvoice; Time Bomb; Gloopy (remaster)
- Producer: The Aquabats, Jim Goodwin

The Aquabats chronology
The Return of The Aquabats (1995)	The Fury of the Aquabats! (1997)	The Aquabats vs. the Floating Eye of Death! (1999)

Singles from The Fury of the Aquabats
- 1. "Super Rad!" Released: 1997; 2. "My Skateboard!" Released: 1997

The Fury of the Aquabats! is the second studio album by American rock band the Aquabats, released on October 28, 1997, by Goldenvoice Records and Time Bomb Recordings.

== Overview ==
Much like their debut album, The Fury of the Aquabats! is driven by its blatantly "wacky" comedic sensibility, anchored by the Aquabats' characteristic songwriting staples of self-referential anthems ("Theme Song!"), songs developing characters in the band's stage shows (e.g. "Powdered Milk Man!"), cartoon and comic book-influenced narratives (e.g. "Captain Hampton & the Midget Pirates!") and pop culture satire ("Idiot Box!").It also includes some of their more well-known songs, like Red Sweater and Super Rad.

While the album is also predominantly rooted in ska music, it features noticeably emphasized elements of surf rock and punk rock over that of its predecessor, as well as featuring streaks of eccentric genre experimentation the Aquabats would continue to develop on further releases: among its sixteen tracks, The Fury includes two instrumentals, pastiches of tango ("Attacked by Snakes!") and Dixieland jazz ("Lobster Bucket!"), and extensive use of unconventional instruments including clarinets, electric sitars, banjos, sousaphones and even hand music.

The Fury was the first Aquabats album to feature dual keyboardist and saxophonist Jimmy the Robot (James Briggs, credited under his then-stage name of Jaime the Robot) and the only album to feature drummer The Baron von Tito (Travis Barker), who would amicably part ways with the band in 1998 after accepting an offer to join pop punk trio Blink-182.

== Release and reception ==
Released at the height of the late 1990s American ska revival which the Aquabats were initially a part of, The Fury proved to be the band's minor commercial breakthrough, peaking at number 172 on the Billboard 200, which remained their highest placement on the chart for over 20 years until The Aquabats! Super Show! Television Soundtrack: Volume One debuted at number 165 in 2018. The Fury also reached number 12 on Billboard's Top Heatseekers, which would also eventually be surpassed in 2011 by their fifth studio album Hi-Five Soup! debuting at number 5.

The song "Super Rad!" was issued as The Fury's lead single, receiving heavy rotation on modern rock stations such as Los Angeles' influential KROQ-FM, while its music video - directed by comedian Bobcat Goldthwait, who was then involved with the band's 1998 television pilot - was regularly played on MTV. Despite decent airplay, "Super Rad!" failed to achieve any significant chart success, nor did the album's follow-up single "My Skateboard!".

Critical reception to The Fury was mostly positive. Stephen Thomas Erlewine of AllMusic rated the album with four stars out of five, writing that it "fulfills the promise of their debut, offering an infectious collection of ska-punk. Although the group's songwriting is a little uneven, and they have the tendency to wallow in sophomoric, 'wacky' humor, they have enough hooks and energy to satisfy ska junkies."

== Track listing ==
No.	Title	Writer(s)	Length
1.	"Super Rad!"	C. Jacobs, C. Larson	3:02
2.	"Red Sweater!"	C. Jacobs, C. Larson	3:24
3.	"Magic Chicken!"	C. Jacobs, C. Pollock	3:40
4.	"Fight Song!"	C. Gray	1:13
5.	"Cat with 2 Heads!"	C. Jacobs, C. Pollock	3:01
6.	"The Story of Nothing!"		2:54
7.	"Captain Hampton and the Midget Pirates!"	C. Jacobs, C. Larson	4:03
8.	"Martian Girl!"	C. Jacobs, C. Larson, M. Van Gundy	2:46
9.	"Attacked by Snakes!"	C. Gray, C. Jacobs	5:01
10.	"Idiot Box!" (C. Jacobs, Creed Watkins, Parker Jacobs)		2:00
11.	"Powdered Milk Man!"	C. Jacobs, C. Larson	3:04
12.	"My Skateboard!"	A. Deibert, C. Jacobs	2:43
13.	"Phantasma del Mar!"	C. Larson, B. Terry	3:12
14.	"Lobster Bucket!"	J. Briggs, A. Deibert, C. Gray, C. Jacobs, C. Pollock	2:42
15.	"Theme Song!"	Bill Hardie, C. Jacobs, C. Larson, C. Pollock, B. Terry	1:48
16.	"Playdough!" (hidden track)	C. Jacobs, B. Terry, M. Van Gundy	6:43
Total length:			51:16

20th anniversary version
No.	Title	Writer(s)	Length
17.	"Hockey Fight!"	C. Jacobs, C. Larson	0:41
18.	"Adventure Today! (demo version)"	C. Gray, C. Jacobs	2:58
Total length:			54:55

=== Previous and subsequent versions ===
- Earlier recordings of tracks 12 and 13 first appeared on the 1995 demo tape Bat Boy.
- Tracks 8, 10 and 16 are re-recordings of songs from The Return of the Aquabats.
- The version of "Adventure Today!" which appears on the 20th anniversary remaster is a demo of a track that would later appear on the 2000 compilation Myths, Legends and Other Amazing Adventures, Vol. 2.

== Personnel ==
The Aquabats

- The Bat Commander! – lead vocals
- Jaime the Robot! – alto, tenor and baritone saxophones, clarinet, piano, vocals, Clavinova, Mellotron, flute
- Chainsaw, The Prince of Karate! – electric and acoustic guitars, vocals, sampling, electric sitar
- Prince Adam! – trumpet, Roland Juno-106, vocals, programming, Farfisa, hand wind
- Crash McLarson! – bass guitar, organ, vocals
- Catboy! – trumpet, cornet, vocals, sousaphone, Hammond B3
- The Baron von Tito! – drums, percussion
- Ultra Kyu! – electric and acoustic guitars, finger cymbals, piano, banjo, EBow, violin, sitar, Mellotron, vocals, Moog synthesizer

Additional musicians

- Ikie Owens - keyboards
- Blake Handler - piano on "Lobster Bucket!"
- Parker Jacobs, Bill Hardie, Patrick McDonald - backing vocals

== Charts ==
Chart (1997)	Peak position
US Billboard 200	172
US Heatseekers Albums (Billboard)	12
