= Yo Gabba Gabba! =

American children's musical puppet television series

- Genre: Children's television series Musical; Educational
- Created by: Christian Jacobs; Scott Schultz
- Developed by: Kay Wilson Stallings
- Presented by: Lance Robertson
- Voices of: Adam Deibert; Christian Jacobs; Amos Watene; Erin Pearce; Emma Jacobs
- Opening theme: Yo Gabba Gabba! Theme
- Ending theme: Closing Theme
- Country of origin: United States
- Original language: English
- No. of seasons: 4
- No. of episodes: 66 (list of episodes)

Production
- Executive producers: Michael Polis; Jon Berrett
- Producers: Justin Lyon; Ritamarie Peruggi
- Camera setup: Multi-camera
- Running time: 25 minutes
- Production companies: The Magic Store; Wildbrain Entertainment

Original release
- Network: Nickelodeon (2007–2011); Nick Jr. Channel (2012–2015)
- Release: August 20, 2007 – November 12, 2015

Yo Gabba Gabba! is an American children's musical television series created by Christian Jacobs and Scott Schultz. It is developed by Kay Wilson Stallings. The show is about a human musician named DJ Lance Rock and 5 friendly costumed toys: Muno, the red cyclops; Foofa, the pink flower bubble; Plex, the magical yellow robot; Brobee, the little green broccoli bee/forest creature; and Toodee, the blue cat-dragon. It is co-produced by the Magic Store and Wildbrain Entertainment. Its first episode premiered on Nickelodeon on August 20, 2007, as a part of its Nick Jr. block. In 2011, beginning with the fourth season the series moved to the Nick Jr. Channel. The final episode aired on November 12, 2015, and following the end of the fourth season, Nickelodeon announced that Yo Gabba Gabba! had been cancelled and would not be renewed for a fifth season. However, reruns aired on the Nick Jr. Channel until October 24, 2016. The television program spawned a touring live stage show, several toys, and branded clothing.

In 2021, it was announced that the series would be revived for Apple TV+. The revival series, titled Yo Gabba GabbaLand!, consists of 20 new episodes. The first season premiered on August 9, 2024 and the second season premiered on January 30, 2026. Apple TV+ has also acquired the previous episodes and specials for its service.

== Overview ==
Hosted by a human musician named DJ Lance Rock (who wears an orange suit), the show follows live-action segments featuring 5 friendly costumed toys: Muno (a red cyclops), Foofa (a pink flower bubble), Plex (a yellow robot), Brobee (a little green broccoli bee/forest creature), and Toodee (a blue cat-dragon). In between them are lots of animated sketches and songs.

Among the varied animation sequences during the show is "Super Martian Robot Girl", designed by indie cartoonists Evan Dorkin and Sarah Dyer. The title character of the segment was voiced by Ariela Barer in season one and Caroline Jacobs in season three.

Kidrobot made the toy models of the characters that appear at the beginning and end of each episode. The title of the show pays homage to "Gabba Gabba Hey" by the punk rock band Ramones.

A single topic is addressed in each episode (such as "Adventure", "Friends", or "Dance") through songs and short storylines. Additionally, the show teaches children life and social skills, such as sharing and trying different foods. It also encourages viewers to move along with and dance with the characters in the program. The show is noted for its guest stars consisting of largely indie music acts, and for drawing visual inspiration from 8-bit video games and H.R. Pufnstuf, among other television shows. Created by Jacobs (lead singer of the Aquabats) and Schultz, the show's learning process has parents, older siblings, and younger children watch the show together rather than letting it act as a babysitter.

== History ==
Yo Gabba Gabba! was developed by two Southern California punk rockers, Christian Jacobs (best known under the stage persona The MC Bat Commander in The Aquabats) and Scott Schultz, who first started working together as teenagers, producing and directing skateboarding videos. Their goal was to design a kids' show that was entertaining while featuring real artists and real performers. Both had no past experience writing scripts for television, let alone children's broadcasting or education. In developing the show, they took inspiration from a number of classic children's series including Sesame Street, The Electric Company, Pee-wee's Playhouse, Zoom, as well as the Sid and Marty Krofft puppet shows The Banana Splits and H. R. Pufnstuf.

After becoming parents, Jacobs and Schultz started playing around with ideas for children's television and produced a pilot independently financed by small loans from friends and family. Yo Gabba Gabba! did not get much attention until it started circulating on the Internet. Jared Hess, the director of Napoleon Dynamite and Nacho Libre, saw the pilot online and recommended it to Brown Johnson, the executive vice president and executive creative director of Nickelodeon Preschool.

== Episode format ==
All episodes follow a similar format. In the opening scene of the episode, DJ Lance is shown walking on a plain white background while holding a silver radio with colorful buttons. He then arrives at a table with four different colored lands and a silver design underneath it. He then places down the boombox, and then he shouts "Yo Gabba Gabba!" and opens the boombox, and inside it are five toys from left to right: Muno, Foofa, Plex, Brobee, and Toodee. He places down the toys one-by-one, and then they become alive.

The episode features four main segments (shortened to three after the first season) that are connected to each other as a plot. They involve DJ Lance and the Gabba gang doing an activity. After each main segment, a short clip is shown that shows a child dancing around. The child says his or her name and that they like to dance.

Between the main segments, there is another segment called "The Super Music Friends Show", which features a performance by an artist or a band about the episode's theme. Other small segments include "Mark's Magic Pictures" and "Biz's Beat of the Day".

Near the end of each episode, DJ Lance and the Gabba gang do a mix-like song about what had occurred during the main segments. After it is finished, DJ Lance thanks the children at home for playing along and shouts "Yo Gabba Gabba!" once again. Then Muno, Foofa, Plex, Brobee, and Toodee turn back into toys. One-by-one, DJ Lance puts them back in the boombox, closes it, and then walks off carrying it, thus ending each episode.

== Characters ==
- DJ Lance Rock (played by Lance Robertson) is a human musician. He is the host of the show. He is the friend of Muno, Foofa, Plex, Brobee, and Toodee (the Gabba gang) who he brings to life in a magical silver boombox where they start out toys at the beginning and end of every episode. He usually wears an orange jumpsuit. His hobbies are dancing, playing his keyboard, singing songs, and flying.
- Muno (voiced by Adam Deibert) is a red cyclops. He is the tallest member of the Gabba gang. He is known for being clumsy. He is close friends with Foofa. Muno is also the band's guitarist. He lives in a rock-filled, summer-themed desert-like place called "Muno Land". His hobbies are playing his guitar, seeing bugs, skateboarding, and building a castle out of blocks. His realm resembles the desert and he has a pet horse alongside a family.
- Foofa (voiced by Emma Jacobs) is a pink flower-bubble hybrid. She is seemingly fond of flowers, rainbows, dolphins, and unicorns. She lives in a spring-themed place called "Foofa Land". She is the band's tambourinist. Her realm is a spring meadow with flower covered green hills and a trio of colorful flowers (purple, yellow, and orange). Her hobbies are watering her flowers, whistling like a bird, playing her tambourine, and riding her bike.
- Plex (voiced by Christian Jacobs) is a yellow magical robot. He is described as being very smart and the leader of Gabba Land. Plex often teaches lessons to his friends and he is a father figure to the gang. He can also use his special ray to bring things into existence and can also transport living things. He is the band's keyboardist who plays the keytar (part keyboard, part guitar). Unlike the rest of the Gabba gang, he has no realm in particular, though he seems to have a "docking station" between Foofa Land and Brobee Land which is shaped like a battery. However "Yo Gabba Gabba Land" showcased that he resides in an underground factory, His hobbies are driving his car, beaming DJ Lance Rock down and playing his keytar. He is presumably the oldest member of the Gabba gang.
- Brobee (voiced by Amos Watene) is a little and furry green broccoli bee-like monster. He lives in an autumn-themed place called "Brobee Land". He is the band's drummer. He is one of the only main characters whose facial expression changes depending on the specific situation; his normal smiling face turning into a frown, and vice versa. His hobbies are trying different foods, playing his drums, riding his scooter, and coloring. His realm is a large autumn forest filled with lots of trees, a stump, and a log. He is around 4 years old as he celebrated his birthday in one episode of the show making him the only one of the Gabba gang to have a confirmed age.
- Toodee (voiced by Erin Pearce) is a blue cat-dragon who loves to have fun. She has a close friend with Plex and she is also the band's bassist. She lives in an arctic winter-themed realm filled with icicles called "Toodee Land". She loves jumping. Her hobbies are ice-skating, playing her bass, surfboarding in the ocean, and tap-dancing.
- Gooble (voiced by Joel Fox and later Christian Jacobs) is a very sad white ghost. He usually cries a lot. He is generally portrayed with a sad expression, with black eyes and a frowning red mouth. While he sometimes tends to magically pop up from time to time occasionally in Gabbaland, he lives in a spooky place on his own known as "Gooble Land" where he seemingly resides in a mansion.
- Super Martian Robot Girl (voiced by Ariela Barer in Season 1) is a green and pink humanoid superhero with the power of common sense who appears in her title segment from Season 1. She eventually returned as a guest during the Story Time Segment in 1 episode of Season 3 and she was voiced by Caroline Jacobs.
- Mark Mothersbaugh is a member of Devo. He appears as a artist drawing pictures in his segment "Mark's Magic Pictures" that become alive.
- Biz Markie is a human D.J. who demonstrates beatboxing in "Biz's Beat of the Day".

Other minor characters besides the main ones listed below that had also appeared throughout the show include The Yo Dazzlers, Barbara the giant moth lady, recurring guest star, Leslie Hall, The Magic Ball Friends, Super Soapy Pal, Balloony the balloon, The Trash Can, Toodee's younger brother, Keedee, Plex's niece, Plexee, Archibald the purple worm and his children, Annie and Armand, The Oskie Bugs, Chibo, Muno's big sister, Muno's parents (Bruno and Una), Gogo, Muno's baby brother, Foofle (Foofa's surfer dude older brother), and a assortment of animated animals, insects, trees, rocks, icicles, hills, and flowers, There were also puppets on the show including the talking motorbike Jack Black rode on, Carl the Giant Dragon, Super Soapy Pal, and Croakey the Frog.

=== Guest stars ===
Yo Gabba Gabba! featured hundreds of guest stars:

- Mos Def
- Bootsy Collins
- Ladytron
- The Killers
- Enon
- The Clientele
- Jimmy Eat World
- Solange Knowles
- Taking Back Sunday
- Datarock
- The Aquabats
- Devo
- Anne Heche
- Joy Zipper
- Of Montreal
- Chromeo
- My Chemical Romance
- Weezer
- Cornelius
- Hot Hot Heat
- The Faint
- The Roots
- Paul Williams
- Mates of State
- MGMT
- Peter Bjorn and John
- Trunk Boiz
- The Shins
- The Aggrolites
- The Flaming Lips
- Mýa
- Blitzen Trapper
- The Ting Tings
- Money Mark
- Mariachi El Bronx
- "Weird Al" Yankovic
- Erykah Badu
- Sean Kingston
- Rob Dyrdek

Other celebrities to have appeared include Leslie Hall (a recurring guest star), Jason Bateman, Jack Black, Andy Samberg, Melora Hardin, Tony Hawk, Elijah Wood, Sarah Silverman, Laila Ali, Héctor Jiménez, John Francis Daley, Samm Levine, Martin Starr, Bill Hader, and Anthony Bourdain.

== Regular segments ==
- Jingles, each episode has animated music videos featuring music by a guest performer and animation by guest artists, designers, and animators. They often happen after the first segment in every episode.
- Mark's Magic Pictures, starring Mark Mothersbaugh, drawing simple pictures that often come alive at the end of the segment.
- Biz's Beat of the Day, starring Biz Markie, demonstrating new beatboxing beats.
- The Super Music Friends Show, featuring musical guests and introduced by Matt Chapman as the announcer and John Reis as "The Music Swami".
- Dancey Dance Time, featuring celebrity guests doing dance moves with the characters. It was rarely used after season 1.
- Numbers, live action music video similar to the jingles, usually with counting up numbers or back.
- Cool Tricks, in which child or an adult demonstrates a special talent.
- Storytime, where a child narrates a story.
- Super Martian Robot Girl, a comic book segment featuring a helpful green-haired superheroine who saves the day, but only solves extremely contrived misunderstandings of uninformed citizens, instead of fighting crime. This segment was used in season 1 and returned for one episode ("Superhero") in season 3.
- Learn with Plex, a solo segment in which Plex teaches kids basic daily skills like brushing their teeth, making lemonade, putting on pajamas, etc. in children's shouts, using four repeated steps. Only used in season 1.
- Play Pretend with Muno, in which Muno encourages viewers to pretend along with him, as he imagines himself as different animals, even an astronaut and a Christmas tree. Only used in season 1.
- Listen to Sounds with Toodee, in which Toodee listens to sounds and encourages the viewers to help her identify them. Only used in season 1.
- Color with Brobee, in which the viewers guess what color Brobee is thinking of by the examples he gives. Only used in season 1.
- Play Games with Foofa, in which Foofa solves simple puzzles, such as mazes and matching games, and encourages the viewers to help her find the solution. Only used in season 1.
- DJ Lance Dance, in which DJ Lance teaches children doing a random dance.
- Funny Faces, in which DJ Lance Rock encourages children to make funny faces.
- Knock-Knock Joke of the Day, a segment where Jack McBrayer and Paul Scheer tell knock-knock jokes. This segment first appeared in season 2.
- Look Back at Today, each episode ends with a music video recap of that episode, featuring special effects, and a remix of every song featured in that episode.

== Episodes ==
Season	Episodes	Originally aired (U.S. dates)	
Season	Episodes	First aired	Last aired
Pilots	3	October 17, 2004, unaired	December 8, 2006, unaired
1	20	August 20, 2007	May 23, 2008
2	20	September 22, 2008	October 16, 2011
3	13	March 8, 2010	September 20, 2011
4	13	December 18, 2011	November 12, 2015
5	20	August 9, 2024	January 30, 2026

== Production ==
For the first season, Jacobs and Schultz both served as writers and alternated as directors for each episode, with Bradley Zweig serving as the story editor for the entirety of the season. Before the second season, Zweig stepped down from his position as story editor to work as a writer for the first season of another Nickelodeon television series, The Fresh Beat Band. Dan Clark was brought in to fill Zweig's position, and also served as a writer for that season, alongside Jacobs, Schultz, Matthew Fackrell, Jason deVilliers, Tiffany Campbell, Sarah Dyer, Evan Dorkin, and Jordan Kim. Fackrell and deVilliers also joined the directing staff for the second season.

The third season saw Jacobs, Schultz, Fackrell, deVilliers, Dyer, Dorkin, and Kim all return, joined by new writers Craig Windes, Joel Fox, Kevin Sukho Lee, and Jacobs' younger brother Parker. Fox was also added to the directing staff. For the fourth and final season, the Jacobs brothers, Schultz, Fackrell, deVilliers, Kim, Windes, and Lee all stayed on, with Kim and Windes also added as directors, joined by several new writers, including brothers Matt and Mike Chapman, Sean Mortimer, Julia Vickerman, Christian and Parker's younger brother Tyler, Bryce Clark, Brent Johnson, Fackrell's brother Nathan, and series star Lance Robertson. The Chapmans, Vickerman, Tyler, Johnson, and Nathan also served as directors.

For the entirety of the show's run, Justin Lyon and Ritamarie Peruggi served as producers, with Peruggi also serving as supervising producer for several episodes. Michael Polis and Jon Berrett were executive producers of the series.

== Home media ==
=== Main releases ===
Name	Release date	Number of episodes	Episode titles	Distributor
The Dancey Dance Bunch	October 14, 2008	4	"Friends"; "Eat"; "Dance"; "Happy"	Paramount Home Media Distribution
New Friends	April 7, 2009	4	"New Friends"; "Find"; "Greetings"; "Share"	Paramount Home Media Distribution
Halloween	August 25, 2009	4	"Halloween"; "Scary"; "Fun"; "Careful"	Paramount Home Media Distribution
Meet My Family	October 20, 2009	4	"Family"; "Games"; "Together"; "Imagine"	Paramount Home Media Distribution
Birthday Boogie	February 2, 2010	4	"Birthday"; "Dress Up"; "Talent"; "Ride"	Paramount Home Media Distribution
Clubhouse	June 15, 2010	4	"Clubhouse"; "Adventure"; "Summer"; "Animals"	Paramount Home Media Distribution
Let's Visit the Doctor	January 11, 2011	4	"Doctor"; "Teeth"; "Clean"; "Car"	Paramount Home Media Distribution
Circus	June 14, 2011	4	"Circus"; "Treasure"; "Flying"; "Fun"	Paramount Home Media Distribution
Music Makes Me Move	August 9, 2011	4	"Band"; "Move"; "Differences"; "Train"	Paramount Home Media Distribution
Yo Gabba Gabba! Live! There's a Party in My City!	March 13, 2012	1	"Live show in Los Angeles with bonus features"	NCircle Entertainment
Super Spies	April 17, 2012	4	"Super Spies"; "Mystery"; "Space"	Paramount Home Media Distribution
A Very Awesome Christmas	October 29, 2013	2	"A Very Awesome Christmas Special"; "Christmas"	NCircle Entertainment
A Very Awesome Holiday Show!	October 14, 2014	1	"A Very Awesome Holiday Show"	NCircle Entertainment

=== Episodes on Nick Jr. compilation DVDs ===
Name	Release date	Episode Title
Sleepytime Stories	April 15, 2008	"Sleep"
All About Fall!	July 29, 2008	"Halloween"
All-Star Sports Day	March 10, 2009	"Move"
Celebrate Family!	June 9, 2009	"Family"
Animal Friends!	September 15, 2009	"Animals"
We Love Our Friends	January 5, 2010	"Love"
Go Green!	March 30, 2010	"Green"
Happy Halloween	August 24, 2010	"Halloween"
Food with Friends!	May 17, 2011	"Eat"
Summer Vacation	June 21, 2011	"Summer"

== Soundtrack releases ==
Four albums have been released featuring songs from the show performed by the cast and the segment, "Super Music Friends Show".

- Music is. Awesome! (2009)
- Music is. Awesome! Volume 2 (2010)
- Music is. Awesome! Volume 3 (September 13, 2011)
- Music is. Awesome! Volume 4 (October 9, 2012)
- Hey! (2017)
- Fantastic Voyages (2017)

ABC for Kids released a CD in 2011 titled Yo Gabba Gabba! Party In My Tummy.

== Stage shows ==
The world premiere live concert tour of Yo Gabba Gabba! took place in Australia in May 15, 2009. DJ Lance Rock, Muno, Foofa, Plex, Brobee, and Toodee performed in Wollongong, Melbourne, Brisbane, and Sydney with an indie house-band and secret special guests at each show. Additional tours in the United States and other countries have been performed throughout 2011. Shows have been toured including three presented by Kia Motors and a special Christmas one presented by Citi, Just Dance Kids, and Toys for Tots.

1. "Yo Gabba Gabba! LIVE on Stage!" (2009)
2. "There's a Party in My City!" (2009-2011)
3. "It's Time to Dance!" (2011)
4. "Get the Sillies Out!" (late 2012-early 2013)
5. "A Very Awesome Holiday Show!" (late 2013)
6. "Music Is Awesome!" (2014)
7. "Yo Gabba Gabba! LIVE!" (2025)

Nick Jr. Australia released a tour in 2009 called Yo Gabba Gabba: LIVE on Stage!

=== Stage show format history ===
Yo Gabba Gabba! LIVE! rollout timeline
Show title	Active date	Country/territory	Release partner(s)
Yo Gabba Gabba!	May 12, 2009 - May 30, 2009, June 4, 2011 - June 11, 2011, June 8, 2013 - June 15, 2013	Australia	Nick Jr. (May 12, 2009 - May 30, 2009); Myer (May 12, 2009 - May 30, 2009)
Yo Gabba Gabba!	November 14, 2009 - December 12, 2010, September 15, 2011 - March 24, 2013, November 29, 2013 - December 7, 2014, April 12, 2025 - April 19, 2025	United States	Kia (August 27, 2010 - December 11, 2011); Citi (November 29, 2013 - December 29, 2013); Just Dance Kids 2014 (November 29, 2013 - December 7, 2014); Apple Music (April 12, 2025 - April 19, 2025)
Yo Gabba Gabba!	November 29, 2009	New Zealand	
Yo Gabba Gabba!	March 17, 2010 - September 19, 2010, September 22, 2011 - November 11, 2011, October 23, 2014	Canada	Kia (September 4, 2010 - November 11, 2011)
Yo Gabba Gabba!	July 17, 2010 - August 1, 2010	Argentina	TuEntrada
Yo Gabba Gabba Live: Yo Gabba GabbaLand	August 1, 2025 - onward	United States	Apple TV

== Critical reception ==
On April 30, 2008, the television show received a Daytime Emmy nomination for Outstanding Achievement in Costume Design/Styling. The show has been nominated for a Daytime Emmy in both 2008 and 2009 for Best Costume Design. Time magazine's James Poniewozik, who said the show "will convince you someone slipped something into your Fruity Pebbles" named Yo Gabba Gabba! one of the Top 10 new TV series of 2007, ranking it at #8. In November 2008, the Yo Gabba Gabba! production team won a BAFTA Children's Award, International. The show has also become popular among some college-aged young adults because of the artists often featured. Due to the show's popularity amongst both adults and children, they performed at Coachella 2010 as special guests. Their live touring show also won a Creative Content Award at the 2010 Billboard Touring Awards. The Television Critics Association Awards have nominated Yo Gabba Gabba! for Outstanding Achievement in Children's/Youth Programing. The years include 2008–2012. Yo Gabba Gabba! won for the year 2009 and 2010. In February 2013, Yo Gabba Gabba! won two Kidscreen Awards for "Best Non-Animated or Mixed Series 2013" and "Best Music 2013".

== In other media ==
- In 2009, the cast was featured in their own float in the Macy's Thanksgiving Day Parade.
- Muno was featured in a commercial for the Kia Sorento that aired during the 2010 Super Bowl and other Kia commercials in 2011. Also, the character Brobee appeared in a 2011 advertisement for Wonderful Pistachios.
- The cast appeared in the Big Time Rush episode "Big Time Cameos".
- Yo Gabba Gabba! appeared in True Jackson, VP in the episode Trapped in Paris.
- Garry Lyon, of The Footy Show, an Australian Football League panel show, performed an interpretive cycle (Yo Gabba Gazza!) based on the Yo Gabba Gabba! dancing style after losing a humorous bet. The choice of the Yo Gabba Gabba! dance was based on a number of physical similarities to Brobee, including bushy eyebrows and excessive androgenic hair.
- In the Mad episode "So You Think You Can Train Your Dragon How to Dance / Yo Gagga Gagga!", Lady Gaga hosts Yo Gagga Gagga! featuring her dolls – Taylor Swift, T-Pain, Miley Cyrus, and Triple H – and the cast is seen watching a monster movie at the end.
- In 2011, the cast appeared in the Raising Hope episode "Sabrina Has Money".
- The title of the Futurama episode "Yo Leela Leela" parodies this, as does the show Leela produces during the episode, known as "Rumbledy Hump".
- On 2009, The Fresh Beat Band's 15th episode in season three "Yo! Fresh Beats Go Gabba Gabba!" (a crossover episode) the "Gabba Gang" gets beamed into the episode by way of a malfunctioned Plex has with robotic hiccups which was caused by Gearmo: a gear who always causes trouble.
- Insane Clown Posse recorded a cover of the song "Hold Still" for the 2012 album Smothered, Covered & Chunked.
- The South Park episode "Taming Strange" features Foofa becoming a spoof of Miley Cyrus after Kyle's adopted younger brother, Ike, attends a performance and "tames Foofa's strange" in front of everyone seeing the show.
- The cast appeared in a Delta Air Lines safety video which first aired in August 2015.
- In 2017, a spin-off called DJ Lance and The Upbeat Retreat!, produced by WildBrain Studios (now WildBrain Spark Studios) premiered on YouTube, featuring DJ Lance Rock with his new friends.
- The cast appeared in Cupcake Wars.
- The cast appeared in Top Chef Masters.
- The series is spoofed in the Robot Chicken episode "May Cause Light Cannibalism".
- The series is briefly featured in the Marvel Cinematic Universe miniseries WandaVision, appearing on Agnes' television screen in the seventh episode "Breaking the Fourth Wall".

== Yo Gabba GabbaLand! ==
=== Phase 1 - Revival TV series ===
On September 10, 2021, WildBrain announced that the series would be revived for 20 new episodes, which would be produced in collaboration between WildBrain and Yo Gabba Gabba LLC (the co-owners of the Yo Gabba Gabba! brand).

In April 2024 it was confirmed that the revival, now titled Yo Gabba GabbaLand! and featuring 10 new episodes, would premiere on Apple TV+ on August 9, 2024. The revival features a new host, Kammy Kam, played by 12-year-old Kamryn Smith along with all five of the original show's characters with the original voice actors reprising their roles. Much like the original series, Yo Gabba GabbaLand! also features a variety of guest celebrity stars including Reggie Watts, Sam Richardson, Gillian Jacobs, Utkarsh Ambudkar, Lauren Lapkus and Chelsea Peretti, as well as music stars like Diplo and Flea of the Red Hot Chili Peppers. The second season was released on January 30, 2026.

=== Phase 2 - Promotional live appearances ===
In December 2024, the cast and monsters from Yo Gabba GabbaLand! appeared at a Tiny Desk Concert.

On April 12, 2025, Yo Gabba Gabba!'s set featured guest appearances from Flavor Flav, DJ Lance Rock, Thundercat, "Weird Al" Yankovic, Paul Williams, Portugal. The Man and cartoon WildBrain costumed characters at Coachella.

On August 1 through August 31, 2025, they give out Yo Gabba Gabba Live Show. This is Kammy Kam's first live concert with the Gabba Friends with brand new songs and also original songs from Yo Gabba Gabba.
