= Scott Schultz (producer) =

American television producer

- Born: September 15, 1971 (age 53)
- Occupation(s): Television producer, art director, musician
- Television: Yo Gabba Gabba!, The Aquabats! Super Show!

Scott Schultz (born September 15, 1971) is an American television producer known for his collaborative work with Christian Jacobs in the creation of the Nick Jr. Channel children's television series Yo Gabba Gabba! and The Hub series The Aquabats! Super Show!.

== The Magic Store ==
In 2005, Schultz, Jacobs and Justin Lyon founded the production company The Magic Store, through which they created the original pilots for their preschooler television series. The series was picked up by Nick Jr. in 2007 and found enormous popularity, with Schultz earning nominations for several Daytime Emmys for art direction and costume design. As of 2012, he is also the co-creator and executive producer of The Aquabats! Super Show!.

== Biography ==
Schultz is a longtime close friend of Christian Jacobs, as well as a cousin by marriage. The two have worked together on numerous art, music and video projects since the late 1980s.

As a musician, Schultz began playing guitar in a shoegaze group with Jacobs called The Moon Men, who eventually disbanded when Jacobs left to form The Aquabats in 1994. The following year, Schultz started the indie pop group Majestic, who recorded two albums before going on hiatus in 2001. He has also contributed composing credits to Yo Gabba Gabba!. Schultz has worked behind-the-scenes with Jacobs' band The Aquabats since their inception, having produced, edited and served as art director for many of their video projects, usually under the pseudonym of "The SeaGhost". He is also credited for co-writing the song "Anti-Matter!" on The Aquabats' 1999 album The Aquabats vs. the Floating Eye of Death!.

Schultz lives in Brea, California with his wife and four children. He is a member of the Church of Jesus Christ of Latter-day Saints.

== Filmography ==
Year	Film	Role
1999	The Aquabats in Color!	Co-creator, producer
2003	Serious Awesomeness!	Director, producer, editor, art director, video mixing
2007–2015	Yo Gabba Gabba!	Co-creator, executive producer, writer, director, art director, composer
2012–2014	The Aquabats! Super Show!	Co-creator, executive producer, writer
2017	RAD Lands	Creator, director
