= Chad Larson =

American musician (born 1965)

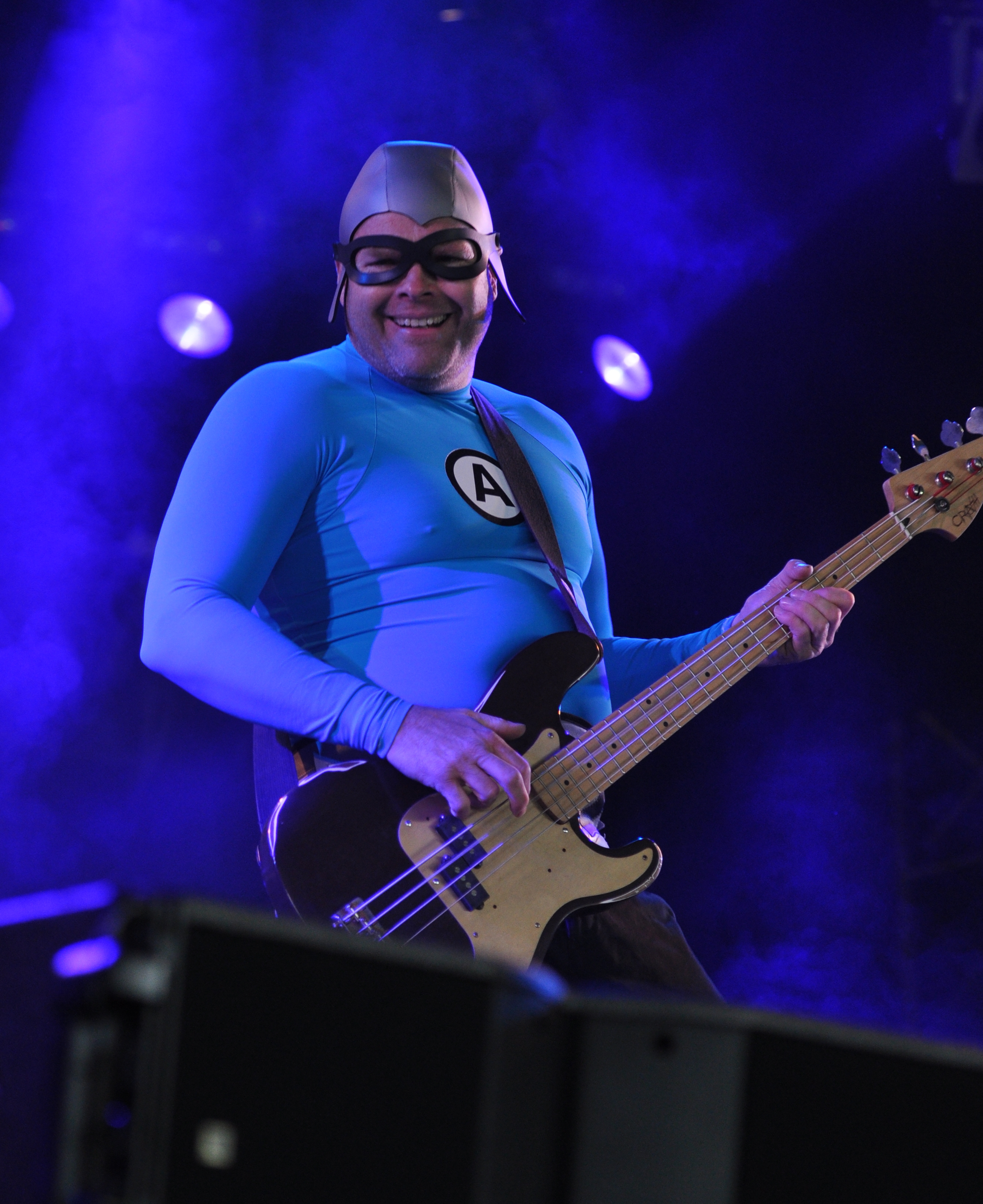
- Larson performing with The Aquabats in 2013

Background information
- Also known as: Crash McLarson
- Born: Chad Albert Larson; October 27, 1965 (age 60); Los Angeles County, California, U.S.
- Genres: Rock, pop punk, punk rock, new wave, ska
- Occupations: Musician, electrician
- Instruments: Bass guitar, trombone
- Years active: 1994–present

Chad Albert Larson (born October 27, 1965) is an American musician, best known as the co-founder and bass guitarist for the Orange County rock band The Aquabats, in which he performs under the stage name and persona of Crash McLarson. From 2012 to 2014, Larson also played Crash McLarson on The Hub original series The Aquabats! Super Show! and on the series' 2019 YouTube-based revival The Aquabats! RadVentures!.

== Biography ==
Larson has been a member of The Aquabats since the group's inception, having co-founded the band alongside Christian Jacobs and Boyd Terry in 1994. In the earliest days of the band, Larson played trombone before switching to bass guitar. Since then, he's acted as one of The Aquabats' most prominent songwriters, writing or co-writing a majority of the band's material. On The Aquabats! Super Show!, Larson worked as an occasional composer alongside his other bandmates in addition to his co-starring role, as well as contributing screenwriting credits, most prominently on the 2013 episode "The Shark Fighter!".

In the early 1990s and up until their break-up in 1997, Larson was also the bassist for the hardcore punk band B.H.R., an acronym whose meaning regularly changed. In 1999, Larson performed anonymously with other members of The Aquabats in the side project The Sandfleas, where he played guitar under the stage name "Breath".

Outside of The Aquabats, Larson makes a career as a professional electrician. He currently lives in Huntington Beach, California with his wife and four children, and, like bandmates Jacobs and Ian Fowles, is a member of the Church of Jesus Christ of Latter-day Saints.

== Discography ==
=== The Aquabats ===
See The Aquabats discography for a full list of recordings

- The Return of the Aquabats (1996) - bass
- The Fury of the Aquabats! (1997) - bass, organ, vocals
- The Aquabats vs. the Floating Eye of Death! (1999) - bass, vocals
- Myths, Legends and Other Amazing Adventures, Vol. 2 (2000) - bass guitar
- Yo! Check Out This Ride! EP (2004) - bass guitar
- Charge!! (2005) - bass, vocals
- Radio Down! (2010) - bass, backing vocals
- Hi-Five Soup! (2011) - bass, vocals
- The Aquabats! Super Show! Television Soundtrack: Volume One (2019) - bass, vocals
- Kooky Spooky...In Stereo (2020) - bass, vocals
- Finally! (2024) - bass guitar, guitar, vocals

=== B.H.R. ===
- Breaking In! (1993)
- Guttermouth/B.H.R. 7" split (1993)

=== The Sandfleas ===
- Four Songs Four Jerks (1999) - guitar
