= Ska Parade =

Radio Show

Ska Parade, also known as SP Radio One, is a southern California radio show whose goal is to promote up-and-coming ska artists, as well as other types of new bands. The show was created by Tazy Phyllipz and Albino Brown. The show was a part of the Orange County third-wave ska movement of the mid-1990s. In 1998, the Ska Parade was raided by the heavy metal band Gwar, who fought The Aquabats. Ska Parade's first compilation album, Step On It: The Best of The Ska Parade Radio Show, helped the career of Sublime and helped launch third wave ska onto the airwaves of many commercial radio stations (e.g. KROQ-FM, KCXX, 91X). Ska Parade's second compilation, Runnin' Naked Thru the Cornfield, featured exclusive tracks by Reel Big Fish, The Specials, Save Ferris and The Aquabats. **Ska Parade (based in OC, CA) currently airs on www.DirtyRadio.FM (commercial alternative) every Sunday from 8p-10p Pacific.
