= Christian Jacobs =

American musician, TV producer, and actor (born 1972)

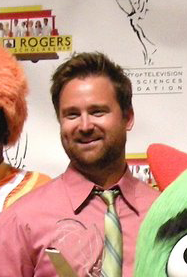
- Christian Jacobs in 2008

Background information
- Also known as: The Caped Commander, The Bat Commander, MC Bat Commander
- Born: Christian Richards Jacobs; January 11, 1972 (age 54); Rexburg, Idaho, United States
- Genres: Rock; new wave; punk rock; ska; synth-pop; children's music
- Occupations: Musician, television producer, actor
- Instrument: Vocals
- Years active: 1982–present

Christian Richards Jacobs (born January 11, 1972) is an American musician, television producer, and actor. He is perhaps most recognized as the co-creator of the award-winning Nick Jr. series Yo Gabba Gabba!, on which he additionally serves as a writer, director, composer, and voice actor.

Under the stage persona of The MC Bat Commander, Jacobs is also well known for his work as lead singer for the Orange County rock band The Aquabats, which he co-founded in 1994. In addition to his musical work with the band, Jacobs also portrayed the character of the Bat Commander on the live-action comedy television series The Aquabats! Super Show!, which he also co-created and produced, from 2012 to 2014.

== Biography ==
=== Early life ===
Jacobs was born in Rexburg, Idaho in 1972, the second of five children. Following his family's relocation to Los Angeles at the age of 4, Jacobs and his siblings, namely his older sister Rachel and younger brothers Parker and Tyler, began working as child actors. Throughout the course of his childhood and into his late teens, Jacobs appeared in numerous productions, most prominently playing the role of Joey Stivic in the short-lived All in the Family spin-off Gloria, but primarily playing small roles in teen films such as Pretty in Pink and Gleaming the Cube and episodes of sitcoms like Married... with Children and Roseanne, before retiring from acting in the early 1990s, citing a dislike of the competitive nature of the business.

While working on Gleaming the Cube, Jacobs befriended a number of well known and highly influential skateboarders and artists. In 1990, he worked alongside Mark Gonzales and Jason Lee on Blind Skateboards' Video Days, and as an artist, Jacobs designed board graphics for Tony Hawk's Birdhouse Skateboards and for the Jason Lee and Steve Berra pro models.

The great-grandson of prominent Mormon leader LeGrand Richards, Jacobs is a lifelong member of the Church of Jesus Christ of Latter-day Saints. In 1991, he left the United States to serve as a missionary in the Sendai, Japan mission and lived in and around Tōhoku, Japan for two years. Upon returning to California, he began working different jobs and moonlighting in bands.

=== The Aquabats ===
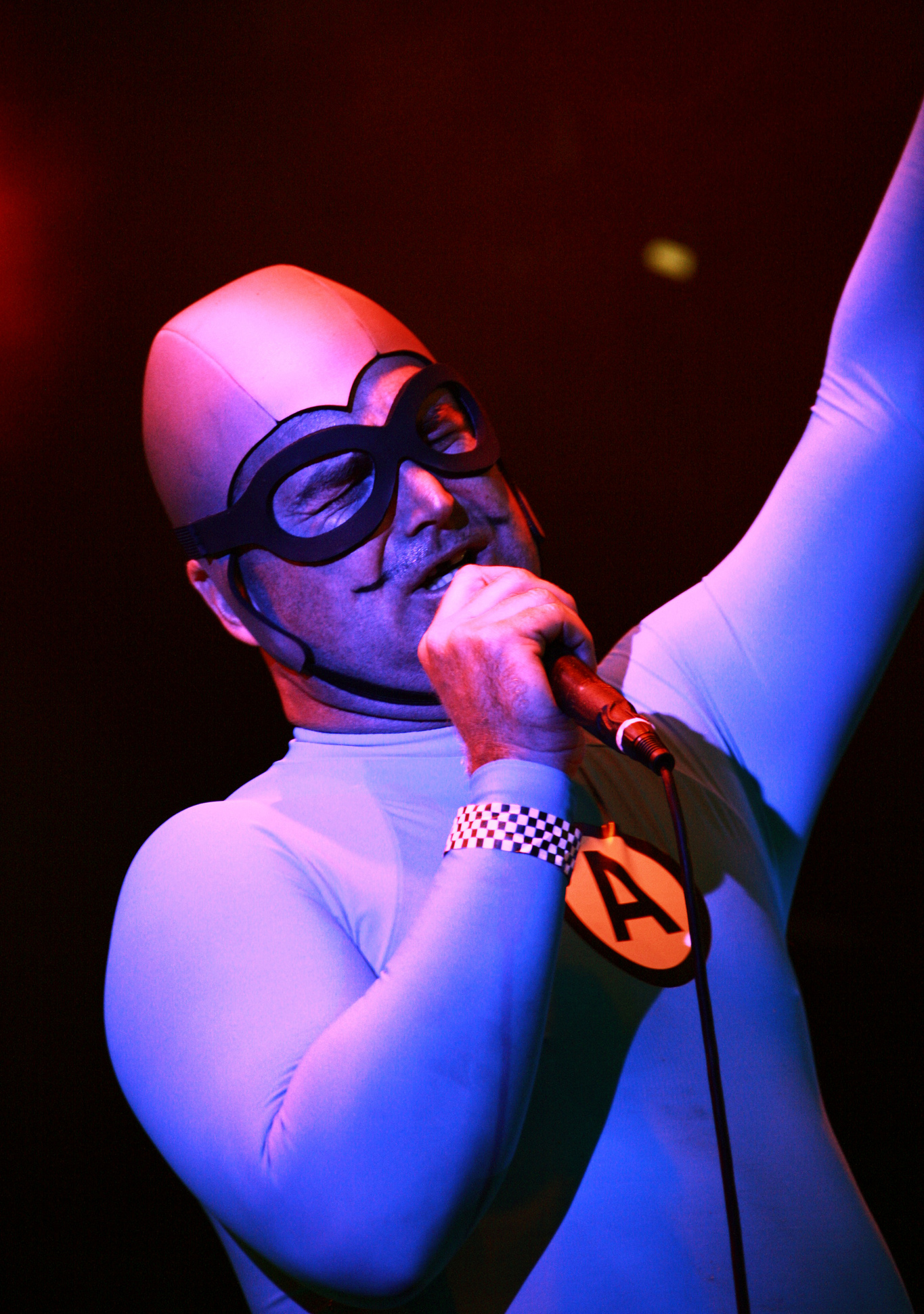
Jacobs performing with The Aquabats as "The MC Bat Commander".

In 1994, Jacobs, along with friends Chad Larson and Boyd Terry, formed the Orange County-based band The Aquabats, wherein he acted as lead singer and lyricist under the stage name of The MC Bat Commander (formerly "The Caped Commander" and "The Bat Commander"). Noted for their matching costumes and theatrical stage shows centered around their superhero-themed alter-ego, The Aquabats initially formed as part of the burgeoning Orange County ska scene, though since 2000 have evolved into playing more punk and new wave-influenced rock music.

Though The Aquabats are most recognized for being a cult act, the band experienced brief mainstream commercial success in the late 1990s during the height of the American ska revival, when their second album The Fury of The Aquabats! peaked at number 172 on the Billboard 200, granting the band national exposure on MTV and as part of the 1998 Vans Warped Tour. During this time, Jacobs was also active producing skateboarding videos with his friend and creative partner Scott Schultz. In 1999, Jacobs anonymously performed with other members of The Aquabats in the side project The Sandfleas, playing drums under the stage name "Fang". In 2018, the band did a live show with popular drummer Travis Barker, for their 20-year reunion show, and at the "Back to the Beach" festival the same year with other old members.

As of 2022, The Aquabats continue to tour and record, and the band's sixth studio album, Kooky Spooky...In Stereo was released in August 2020. On March 3, 2012, The Aquabats! Super Show!, a live-action musical television series starring the band, premiered on cable channel The Hub, with Jacobs serving as co-creator, producer, writer and star. Despite accumulating six Daytime Emmy nominations over the course of two seasons, winning one for stunt coordination, The Hub declined to pick Super Show! up for a third season, effectively cancelling the series. Following a successful Kickstarter campaign in 2018, Super Show! was retooled as a bi-weekly YouTube series which began airing in late 2019.

=== Yo Gabba Gabba! ===
In 1999, Jacobs and Schultz formed a production company which was later formalized as "The Magic Store" with the goal of creating family-oriented television entertainment. Together, the two independently created, wrote and directed two pilot episodes in 2005 for a preschooler-targeted children's television series called Yo Gabba Gabba!. The series was picked up by ViacomCBS's Nickelodeon channel in 2007, eventually becoming an international success and winning numerous television awards. Yo Gabba Gabba! has since completed four seasons. The pilot started in 1999.

== Personal life ==
Jacobs lives in Huntington Beach, California, with his wife and four children.

== Discography ==
=== The Aquabats ===
- The Return of The Aquabats (1996) - vocals
- The Fury of The Aquabats! (1997) - vocals
- The Aquabats vs. the Floating Eye of Death! (1999) - vocals
- Myths, Legends and Other Amazing Adventures, Vol. 2 (2000) - vocals
- Yo! Check Out This Ride! EP (2004) - vocals
- Charge!! (2005) - vocals
- Radio Down! (2010) - vocals
- Hi-Five Soup! (2011) - vocals
- The Aquabats! Super Show! Television Soundtrack: Volume One (2019) - vocals
- Kooky Spooky...In Stereo (2020) - vocals
- Finally! (2024) - vocals, guitar

=== Collaborations ===
- "Got Sumethin' (That You Ought to Know)" from Bad Credit's album Giving Back by Giving Up (2004)
- "This Gigantic Robot Kills" from MC Lars' album This Gigantic Robot Kills (2009)
- ”The Final Parade” from The Mighty Mighty Bosstones’ album When God Was Great (2021)

== Filmography ==
=== Film ===
Year	Film	Role
1986	Pretty in Pink	Boy in record store
1989	Gleaming the Cube	Gremic
1994	There Goes My Baby	Jeff
2008	Punk Rock Holocaust 2	MC Bat Commander

=== Television ===
Year	Title	Role	Notes
1982	Cassie & Co.	Caleb Merritt	Episode: "Dark Side of the Moon"
1982	The Love Boat	B.J.	Episode: "The Best of Friends/Too Many Dads/Love Will Find a Way" S6 E7
1982–1983	Gloria	Joey Stivic	Series regular
1984	Second Sight: A Love Story	Bruce	Television film
1984	Finder of Lost Loves	Scott Hargrove	Episode: "Maxwell, Ltd." (series pilot)
1984	Highway to Heaven	Danny	Episode: "Catch a Falling Star"
1984	ABC Weekend Special	Kurt Landry	Episode: "Henry Hamilton, Graduate Ghost"
1985	The History of White People in America	Tommy Harrison	Television film
1985	The Canterville Ghost	Rob	Television film
1985	Berrenger's	Bob	Episode: "Dangerous Ground"
1985	V	Billy	Episode: "Breakout"
1985	Adventures of the Gummi Bears	Cavin	Voice, season 1
1986	The History of White People in America: Volume II	Tommy Harrison	Television film
1987	In Love and War	Jimmy (age 14)	Television film
1987	Convicted: A Mother's Story		Television film
1988	Portrait of a White Marriage	Tommy Harrison	Television film
1988	Out of This World	Derek Rogers	Episode: "Broadway Danny Derek"
1988	Just the Ten of Us	Club Leader / Todd	2 episodes
1989	Married... with Children	Shep	Episode: "A Three Job, No Income Family"
1989	Hard Time on Planet Earth	Mark Brady	Episode: "Rodeo Show"
1989	ABC Afterschool Special	Danny	Episode: "My Dad Can't Be Crazy...Can He?"
1989	Roseanne	Andrew	Episode: "Chicken Hearts"
1990	Guns of Paradise	Henry	Episode: "The Gates of Paradise"
1990	Exile	Derf	Television film
1990	Major Dad	Private LaBonte	Episode: "Infant-ry"
1999	The Aquabats in Color!	Bat Commander	Television pilot; also co-creator, writer and director.
2007–2015	Yo Gabba Gabba!	Plex	Voice; also co-creator, writer and director.
2008, 2012–2014	The Aquabats! Super Show!	MC Bat Commander	Also co-creator and writer
2012	The Fresh Beat Band	Plex	Voice, episode: "Yo! Fresh Beats Go Gabba Gabba!"
2013	Big Time Rush	Security Guard, Plex	Voice, episode: "Big Time Cameo"

=== Music Videos ===
Year	Title	Role
1996	Reel Big Fish - Everything Sucks	Co-directed with Jeff Gordon
1997	Chopper One - Touch My Fuzz	Sammy Boujelias

== Awards ==
The following list is of awards Christian Jacobs has been personally nominated for:

Year	Nominee / work	Award	Result
1983	Young Artist Award	Best Young Actor in a New Television Series (Gloria)	Nominated
1986	Young Artist Award	Outstanding Young Actor - Animation Voice Over (Disney's Adventures of the Gummi Bears)	Nominated
2008	Daytime Emmy	Outstanding Achievement in Costume Design/Styling (Yo Gabba Gabba!)	Nominated
2009	Daytime Emmy	Outstanding Achievement in Costume Design/Styling (Yo Gabba Gabba!)	Nominated
2011	Daytime Emmy	Outstanding Achievement in Art Direction/Set Decoration/Scenic Design (Yo Gabba Gabba!)	Nominated
2011	Daytime Emmy	Outstanding Pre-School Children's Series (Yo Gabba Gabba!)	Nominated
2012	Daytime Emmy	Outstanding Achievement in Costume Design/Styling (Yo Gabba Gabba!)	Nominated
2012	Daytime Emmy	Outstanding Pre-School Children's Series (Yo Gabba Gabba!)	Nominated
2013	Daytime Emmy	Outstanding Children's Series (The Aquabats! Super Show!)	Nominated
2014	Daytime Emmy	Outstanding Writing for a Children's Series (The Aquabats! Super Show!)	Nominated
