= Adam Deibert =

American musician and voice actor

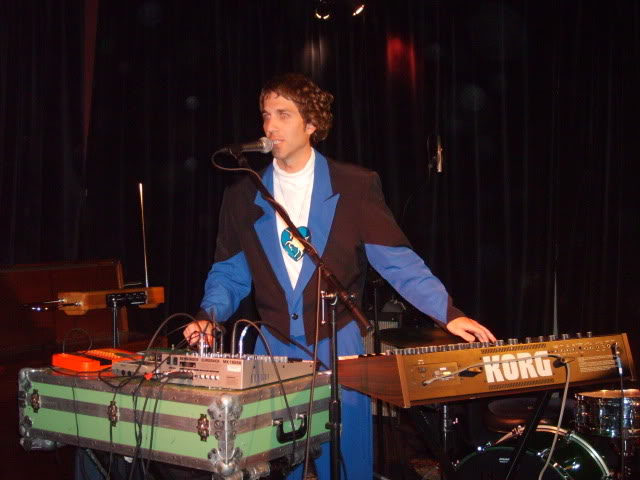
- Deibert performing as part of Digital Unicorn in 2007.

Background information
- Also known as: Prince Adam
- Born: Adam Warren Deibert; August 12, 1976 (age 49); Los Angeles County, California, U.S.
- Origin: United States
- Genres: Rock, indie pop, electronic, ska, experimental, children's music
- Occupations: Musician, composer
- Instruments: Keyboards, guitar, bass guitar, trumpet, hand music
- Years active: 1994–present

Adam Warren Deibert (born August 12, 1976) is an American musician and voice actor, known for his work as a member of The Aquabats from 1994 to 2004, where he played guitar, trumpet and keyboards under the stage name of Prince Adam, and as the bass guitarist for the indie rock band Bikeride, among other projects. He also played trumpet in the Orange County Ska band The Goodwin Club in the early nineties.

Deibert worked as a composer for the Nick Jr. children's series Yo Gabba Gabba!, as well as providing the voice for the character of Muno the Cyclops. An educated musician, Deibert studied at the University of California, Santa Barbara as a music composition major.

== Solo projects ==
=== Digital Unicorn ===
Electronic duo Digital Unicorn came into existence after an opening band at an Aquabats show was unable to attend. Deibert grabbed whatever was readily available for a costume, a mixtape and a keyboard and went onstage. The project soon evolved into a part-time two-member band, with Deibert (as "Mann: Realiser of Music") performing on keyboards, synthesizers and drum machines while a friend in a horse costume (stage name "Hoerse: Creator of the Dance") provided dancing accompaniment. The band released only one album, 2001's Theirs Travel Began and Loaded the Dream on Horchata Records, before entering a quasi-hiatus, reducing their concerts to at least once a year. Digital Unicorn last performed on July 31, 2010 in Pomona, California.

=== Call Sound Call Noise ===
Call Sound Call Noise was one of Deibert's solo projects. He released a self-titled debut album on 13 March 2007.
