= Pool Party! =

2000 song performed by The Aquabats

Song by The Aquabats

from the album Myths, Legends and Other Amazing Adventures, Vol. 2
- Released: May 17, 2000
- Recorded: 1999
- Genre: Comedy rock, pop rock
- Length: 4:15
- Label: Fearless Records
- Songwriter(s): The Aquabats
- Producer(s): Cameron Webb

"Pool Party!" is a song by American band The Aquabats which appears on their 2000 album Myths, Legends and Other Amazing Adventures, Vol. 2, which itself was a compilation of B-sides and unreleased tracks from the recording sessions for the band's 1999 studio album The Aquabats vs. the Floating Eye of Death!.

Despite having never been released as a single, "Pool Party!" eventually became a perennial favorite among Aquabats fans, and has since been played at every one of the band's concerts, almost always as the closing number. In 2007, the song gained minor media attention when it was performed by The Aquabats on the popular Nick Jr. Channel television series Yo Gabba Gabba!, appearing on several soundtrack compilations as well as Yo Gabba Gabba!'s live tours. "Pool Party!" has been described as one of The Aquabats' most popular and well-liked songs, and can arguably be labeled as one of the band's signature songs along with "Super Rad!", "Fashion Zombies!", "Martian Girl!", and "Pizza Day".

== Background ==
In a track-by-track commentary of Myths posted to The Aquabats' website shortly before the album's release, singer Christian Jacobs (The MC Bat Commander) elaborated on the history of "Pool Party!", revealing that the song was originally conceived by former co-founder and trumpeter Boyd Terry (Catboy) during the writing sessions for the band's 1997 studio album The Fury of The Aquabats!. After Terry had written the lyrics, the rest of the band attempted to write accompanying music in several different musical styles, including "a Devo-esque version, Crash's more punk rock version and a kind of '80s cheese pop New Edition style", but were ultimately unsatisfied with any of them and postponed further work on the song indefinitely.

According to Jacobs, "Pool Party!" became an in-joke among the band members to refer to song ideas that get talked about but never get finished. Around 1999, The Aquabats took another shot at reviving "Pool Party!", using an unfinished song called "Windmills!" and combining parts of their previous attempts to eventually arrive at the final version of the song. Jacobs concluded his commentary by noting "Catboy wins for coming up with a funny idea that we never gave up on".

== Overview ==
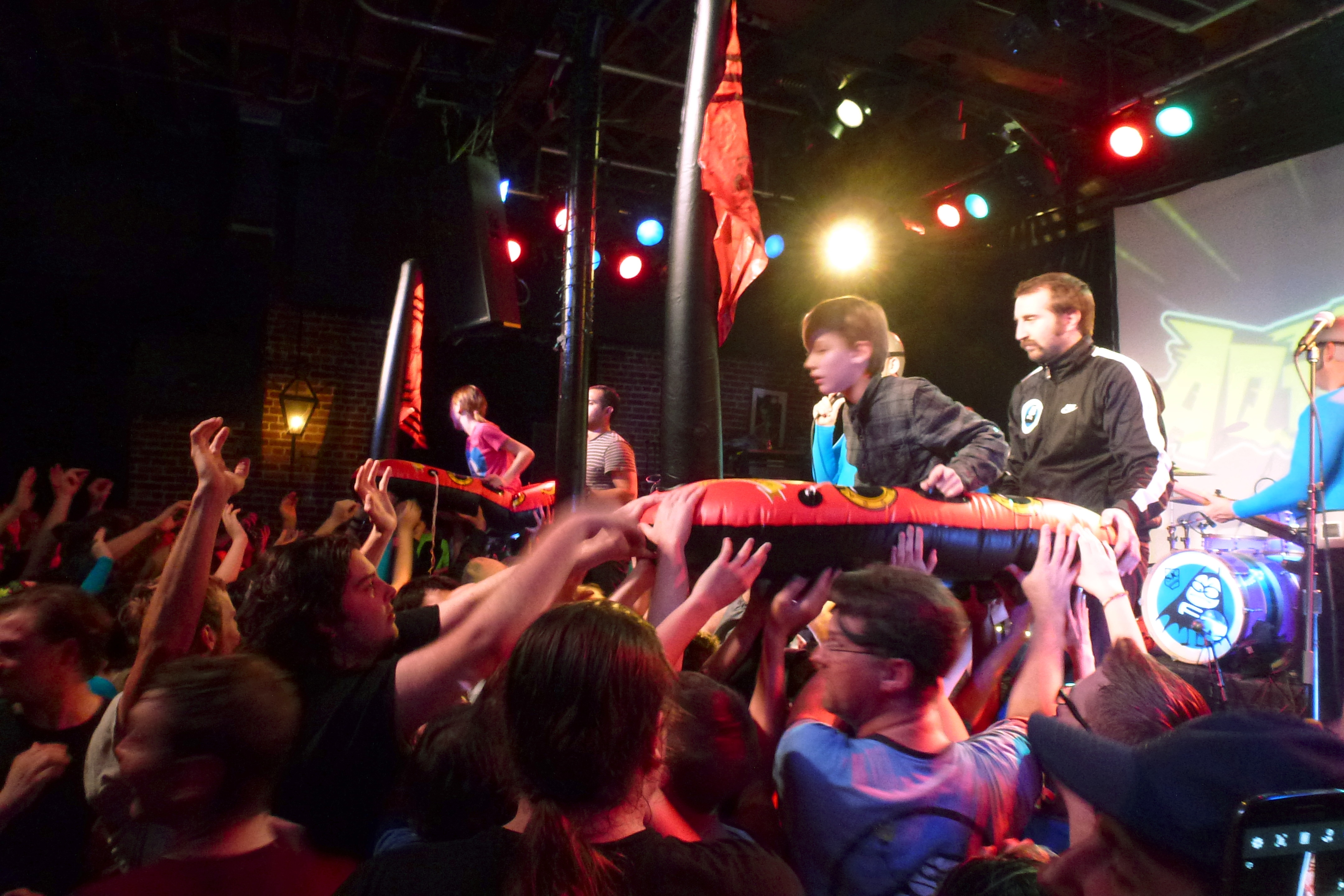
Making extensive use of inflatable pool toys, "Pool Floatie Races" are a common way The Aquabats segue into a live performance of "Pool Party!".

After predominantly experimenting with ska music on their first two albums, The Aquabats consciously decided to move away from an overtly ska-based sound for their studio follow-up and explore much more diverse and eclectic material. "Pool Party!" is no exception, being completely absent of the ska rhythms and brass instruments which characterized the band's previous albums in favor of a guitar-driven pop rock sound and new wave-influenced synthesizer melodies, elements which would both eventually become an integral part of The Aquabats' music on their subsequent studio albums. The bridge of the song features a brief rap breakdown, followed by a short instrumental section which incorporates the main synthesizer melody from Rush's 1981 single "Tom Sawyer".

Lyrically, "Pool Party!" is one of the simplest songs in The Aquabats' repertoire, featuring little of the surreal humor or comic book/fantasy-inspired narratives which make up much of the band's material, instead centering on the description of a "cool pool party" "for the cool kids in my school" being hosted by the narrator. Emphasized by the lyric "there hasn't been a party like this since 1981", "Pool Party!" is a tongue-in-cheek parody of the early 1980s Southern Californian youth culture which most members of The Aquabats grew up in, evidenced by its repeated use of surf and skater slang like "dude" and "bro" and a chorus of female backing vocalists speaking in obvious Valley girl accents delivering such lingo as "your pool rips!" and "holy guacamole!".

The beginning of the track features a spoken word dialogue between The MC Bat Commander and Catboy which segues into the song's lyrics, where the two discuss the titular party while affecting stereotypical California English dialects. At one point, the MC Bat Commander boasts that the party will have "food, and girls, and more food, and Mike Gerudo's coming!", a reference to co-composer Catboy, whose fictionalized character biography on The Aquabats' website listed his "alter ego"'s name as such.

Live shows

Although Myths & Legends failed to meet with any commercial success upon release, "Pool Party!" nevertheless became a favorite among fans and critics alike, with such publications as Geekscape calling it "the greatest singalong song ever". Documented as early as 2003 on the DVD release Serious Awesomeness!, "Pool Party!" quickly moved its way up The Aquabats' setlists, almost always being played as the last song - or the last song before the encore - to close out each of the band's concerts.

As is expected of The Aquabats' stage show, live performances of "Pool Party!" are always accompanied by heavy theatrics. Typically, The Aquabats will invite young children in the crowd to dance onstage throughout the duration of the song, filling out the rest of the stage space with costumed characters and members of their road crew or opening bands. At the start of the song, the band releases scores of beach balls, inflatable pool toys and pool noodles upon the crowd to be tossed about by the audience members.

== Yo Gabba Gabba! version ==
"Pool Party!"

Song by The Aquabats

from the album Music is...Awesome!, Vol. 2 and Yo Gabba Gabba! Hey!
- Released: August 31, 2010
- Recorded: 2007
- Genre: Comedy rock, pop rock
- Length: 1:59
- Label: Filter US
- Songwriter(s): Christian Jacobs, Chad Larson, Boyd Terry
- Producer(s): The Aquabats, Cameron Webb

On August 21, 2007, The Aquabats appeared on the second episode of the first season of Yo Gabba Gabba!, a Nickelodeon children's television series which Christian Jacobs co-created and produced, where they performed to a re-recorded version of "Pool Party!". Outside of a shortened running time which omitted the bridge and final chorus, the re-recording was mostly identical to the original composition, with the exception of a more prominent keyboard mix and an added chorus of children cheering and singing along to parts of the song.

Although the original "Pool Party!" contained no objectionable lyrical content, The Aquabats still chose to rewrite parts of the lyrics to be suitable for Yo Gabba Gabba!'s primary demographic of preschool-aged children. For example, "Girls look cute in their swimming suits" was changed to "Grab your swimming suit, it'll be a hoot", while the main chorus of "It was a pool party for the cool kids in my school" was altered to "It was a pool party for everybody in the world". Despite these changes the band continues to use the original lyrics.

In the wake of Yo Gabba Gabba!'s international critical and commercial success, media attention was turned towards The Aquabats owing both to Jacobs' involvement and the band's frequent appearances in the series. Many internet publications, including About.com and Idolator, placed The Aquabats' performance of "Pool Party!" on their lists of Yo Gabba Gabba!'s best musical guests, while DVD Talk, reviewing the episode on a home video release, considered the band "a perfect addition to the show" and highly praised the episode's music, calling "Pool Party!" "tremendous".

On August 31, 2010, the re-recording of "Pool Party!" was officially released on the Yo Gabba Gabba! soundtrack album Music is...Awesome! Volume 2, also appearing on a later Australian compilation entitled The Best of Yo Gabba Gabba! in November 2012. A live performance of "Pool Party!", filmed as part of a Yo Gabba Gabba! live tour at Los Angeles's Nokia Theater, was included on the DVD Yo Gabba Gabba! Live!: There's a Party in My City!, released on March 13, 2012.

== Credits ==
Original 2000 recording

- The M.C. Bat Commander - vocals
- The Mysterious Kyu - guitar
- Chainsaw Karate - guitar
- Crash McLarson - bass
- The Robot - keyboards
- Doctor Rock (Gabe Palmer) - drums

Although trumpeters Prince Adam and Catboy were part of The Aquabats' line-up during this time, no brass instruments were featured in the song.

2007 re-recording

- The MC Bat Commander- vocals
- EagleBones Falconhawk - guitar
- Crash McLarson - bass
- Jimmy the Robot - keyboards
- Ricky Fitness - drums
