= Yo! Check Out This Ride! EP =

EP by the Aquabats
- Released: 2004
- Recorded: Spring 2004
- Genre: Rock
- Length: 13:32
- Label: The Aquabats Music
- Producer: Adam Deibert; the Aquabats

The Aquabats chronology
| Myths, Legends and Other Amazing Adventures, Vol. 2 (2000) | Yo! Check Out This Ride! EP (2004) | Charge!! (2005) |

Yo! Check Out This Ride! EP is an EP by American band the Aquabats, independently recorded and released by the band themselves in 2004.

== Overview ==
After being dismissed from Goldenvoice Records in 2000 and subsequently failing to find another record label, the Aquabats entered an extended period of relative inactivity in the first half of the 2000s, delaying all plans for extensive touring or future recording due to financial constraints. Yo! Check Out This Ride!!, the Aquabats' first self-produced album since 1996's The Return of the Aquabats, was recorded to both appease the band's fanbase after four years of no new material, as well as to serve as a potential demo to attract interest from record labels. This would ultimately prove successful, as the Aquabats were signed to Nitro Records later in the year.

Yo! Check Out This Ride! was recorded during a transitional period in the Aquabats' career. Following the departure of trumpeter and co-founder Catboy in 2002, the band had dropped their once characteristic horn section and predominant ska elements to focus more exclusively on the guitar and synthesizer-driven rock and new wave influences which had dominated their previous studio album. Musically, the album showcases a hip hop-tinged rock song in the title track and straight synthpop in "Todd-1 in Space Mountain Land!", while featuring cover songs from power pop bands the Plimsouls and the Kinks, and vocal group the Kids of Widney High.

The EP was the first Aquabats album to feature drummer Ricky Fitness, who joined the band in 2002, as well as the final to feature original member Prince Adam as an official member. The cover art, depicting a horseback Aquabat lassoing a dinosaur-like creature, was painted by Brandon Bird.

== Reception ==
Scott Auth of Punknews.org gave Yo! Check Out This Ride! 3½ out of 5 stars, writing "Musically this isn’t the greatest work they’ve ever prepared; sadly there's not a trace of ska to be found on Yo! Check Out This Ride! As heartbreaking as that is, it's still a quality EP worthy of purchase."

== Track listing ==
| No. | Title | Writer(s) | Length |
|---|---|---|---|
| 1. | "Yo! Check Out This Ride!" | The Aquabats | 3:32 |
| 2. | "Todd-1 in Space Mountain Land!" | The Aquabats | 1:31 |
| 3. | "Zero Hour!" | The Plimsouls | 2:07 |
| 4. | "Big Sky!" | The Kinks | 3:03 |
| 5. | "Throw Away the Trash!" | The Kids of Widney High | 3:19 |

=== Previous versions ===
- A demo version of "Todd-1 in Space Mountain Land!", an outtake from the Floating Eye of Death! recording sessions, was first released on The Aquabats' website in the early 2000s.

== Personnel ==
=== The Aquabats ===
- The MC Bat Commander – vocals
- Crash McLarson – bass guitar
- Jimmy The Robot – saxophone, keyboards
- Prince Adam – rhythm guitar, synthesizer, trumpet
- Chainsaw, Prince of Karate – lead guitar
- Ricky Fitness – drums

=== Production ===
- Produced, engineered and mixed by Adam Deibert and the Aquabats
- Mastered by Alex Reverberi
- Recorded at "Global International Worldwide Studios" in Santa Ana, California and "The Deibert Ranch Studios" in Huntington Beach, California.
