= Fashion Zombies! =

Single by The Aquabats

from the album Charge!!
- Released: April 1, 2005
- Recorded: 2005
- Genre: Comedy punk; new wave
- Length: 3:16
- Label: Nitro
- Songwriter: The Aquabats
- Producer: Cameron Webb

The Aquabats singles chronology
"My Skateboard!" (1997)	"Fashion Zombies!" (2005)	"Radio Down!" (2010)

"Fashion Zombies!" is a song by American band The Aquabats and the leading single from their fourth studio album Charge!!, released on Nitro Records in 2005.

== Overview ==
"Fashion Zombies!" was the first single released from The Aquabats' 2005 album Charge!!, which itself was the first album the band had released after a nearly six-year quasi-hiatus from studio recording, during which they had experienced several major changes in their line-up which resulted in a significant shift in musical style. Musically, the song matches the stylistic direction of the rest of the album, featuring a guitar and keyboard-driven rock sound which Johnny Loftus of Allmusic described as a "concise [slice] of new wave-inspired pop that retain[s] that particular Aquabatian flair for the totally wiggy".

Lyrically, the song satirizes social fads and popular fashion, in particular that of the goth and emo subcultures, likening people who adhere to such scenes as "zombies". In the documentary How About Charge!!? on the album's "Special One-Year Anniversary" DVD, singer Christian Jacobs explained that the song was written as the band's reaction towards the newest trend in what he called "fashion rock", popular music that was merely a "soundtrack to the clothes that you wear".

The bridge of the song parodies the bridge of Michael Jackson's "Thriller", repeating Vincent Price's narration of "Darkness falls across the land/The midnight hour is close at hand/Creatures crawling in search of blood..." verbatim, though finishes with "to accessorize their black zipper hoods" in place of the original's "to terrorize your neighborhood".

== Release and reception ==
On April 1, 2005, The Aquabats posted an update on their website where they revealed the release date, title, track listing and cover art for Charge!! along with an MP3 download of "Fashion Zombies!", describing it as one of their "favorite songs from the new record" rather than a single. On June 1, less than a week before the release of Charge!!, the band offered a contest that whoever could help get the song airplay on local radio would be treated to an all-expenses paid meal with The Aquabats. The prize was claimed after a fan got "Fashion Zombies!" played on Los Angeles' KROQ-FM and was taken to a T.G.I. Friday's.

After the moderate success of Charge!! and the band's extensive, well-hyped touring schedule, The Aquabats appeared as musical guests on the September 23, 2005 episode of the G4 news and variety program Attack of the Show! where they performed "Fashion Zombies!" and "Nerd Alert!".

Along with Charge!! as a whole, "Fashion Zombies!" received a very positive response from critics, with most praising the band's effective shift in style and the song's clever lyricism. AbsolutePunk complimented the song's "catchy keyboard harmonies", writing "'Fashion Zombies!' alone confirms that the Bats are progressing in their own unique way, regardless of what's going on in the rest of the music industry".

== Music video ==
A music video for "Fashion Zombies!" was directed by singer Christian Jacobs and Justin Lyon and shot in Los Angeles over the course of two nights during the first week of June 2005. The video was released on The Aquabats' website on July 12, 2005, later receiving an official home media release on the Charge!! "Special One-Year Anniversary Edition" CD/DVD on June 10, 2006.

The first half of the video depicts four groups of varying subcultures - specifically, what appear to be goths, New Romantics, preppies and hipsters - as they square off in a dark alleyway and start fighting each other, intercut with footage of The Aquabats performing the song on a soundstage. In the audio commentary for the music video featured on the DVD of the Charge!! "Special One-Year Anniversary Edition", Jacobs explained that these parts of the video were inspired by the 1979 film The Warriors and Michael Jackson's video for "Beat It". The second half of the video parodies zombie films such as Night of the Living Dead, as The Aquabats arrive at the brawl to settle things down, only to be chased into a foggy forest by all of the "fashion zombies", whose eyes are now glowing pink. The band is cornered into a dilapidated shack where they try to fight back with their instruments, but at the end of the video are ultimately overpowered and given fashionable makeovers, turning into zombies themselves.

Within the canon of the band, the "Fashion Zombies!" music video is notable as the only official Aquabats media to feature guitarist Popeye (Michael Vogelsang), who toured with the band as an additional guitarist in the summer of 2005 though was ultimately never promoted to full-time member status or appeared on any recorded material.

== Credits ==
=== The Aquabats ===
- The MC Bat Commander - vocals
- Crash McLarson - bass, vocals
- Chainsaw - guitar
- Jimmy the Robot - keyboards, vocals
- Ricky Fitness - drums
