= Myths, Legends and Other Amazing Adventures, Vol. 2 =

Compilation album by The Aquabats
- Released: November 7, 2000
- Recorded: Summer 1999, 2000
- Genre: Rock, new wave, punk rock
- Length: 45:46
- Label: Fearless
- Producer: Cameron Webb, The Aquabats

The Aquabats chronology
The Aquabats vs. the Floating Eye of Death! (1999)	Myths, Legends and Other Amazing Adventures, Vol. 2 (2000)	Yo! Check Out This Ride! EP (2004)

Myths, Legends and Other Amazing Adventures, Vol. 2 is a compilation album by American band The Aquabats, released on November 7, 2000 by Fearless Records. The album is a collection of studio outtakes, b-sides and miscellaneous unreleased tracks recorded during the production of the band's 1999 studio album, The Aquabats vs. the Floating Eye of Death!.

== Overview ==
Following the release of their 1997 album The Fury of The Aquabats!, The Aquabats began writing scores of new material in preparation for their next studio album, producing upwards of forty different songs, partial songs and demo recordings. Approximately thirty of those songs received professional recordings during the sessions for what would become 1999's The Aquabats vs. the Floating Eye of Death!, with only fourteen ultimately selected to appear on the official album and the remaining tracks released on Myths & Legends. A large number of unfinished demos and unreleased b-sides were released for free on The Aquabats' website in April 2000 to coincide with the compilation's release.

Myths & Legends covers a broad range of musical styles, as The Aquabats had stated they wanted to explore more diverse musical textures after predominantly showcasing ska music on their first two albums. Much like Floating Eye, most of the tracks on Myths draw heavily upon punk rock and new wave-influenced sounds, with a pronounced usage of keyboards and synthesizers. The compilation also includes songs in synthpop ("Worms Make Dirt"), ska punk ("Pizza Day") and jazz ("Radiation Song") styles, as well as a parody of nu metal bands such as Korn and Limp Bizkit ("I Fell Asleep on My Arm").

As with Floating Eye, Myths & Legends represents the final Aquabats studio material to feature drummer Dr. Rock and lead guitarist The Mysterious Kyu, both of whom would part ways with The Aquabats prior to the recording of their next album. Myths & Legends also marks the last appearance of co-founding trumpeter Catboy, who would leave the band in 2002 though later rejoin as an official member in 2024.

== Reception ==
Jeremy Salmon of Allmusic gave Myths & Legends two stars out of five, saying that "for all the weirdness, oddballity, and the delighted sense of stupid that one gets from the songs, one is disappointed by their uneven quality. Some of these tracks are relatively poor, but more are enjoyable in spite of themselves. If nothing else, this release shows that the Aquabats are as capable with track editing and song inclusion as they are with making their silly songs."

== Track listing ==
All songs written by The Aquabats.

No.	Title	Length
1.	"Robot Theme Song"	1:05
2.	"Hey Luno"	2:48
3.	"Pool Party"	4:15
4.	"Pizza Day"	4:04
5.	"Dear Spike"	4:04
6.	"I Fell Asleep on My Arm"	4:02
7.	"Radiation Song"	3:23
8.	"Adventure Today"	2:55
9.	"The Baker"	3:47
10.	"Danger Woman"	3:43
11.	"Worms Make Dirt"	2:50
12.	"Sandy Face"	2:58
13.	"The Wild Sea"	5:48

== Personnel ==
=== The Aquabats ===
- The MC Bat Commander – vocals
- Prince Adam – synthesizers, trumpet, theremin
- Jimmy the Robot – keyboards, woodwinds
- Crash McLarson – bass guitar
- Doctor Rock (Gabe Palmer) – drums
- Catboy – trumpet, vocals
- The Mysterious Kyu – guitar, banjo
- Chainsaw the Prince of Karate – guitar

=== Production ===
- Produced by Cameron Webb and The Aquabats
- "Adventure Today" recorded and produced by Thom Wilson
