= Charge!! =

Studio album by The Aquabats
- Released: June 7, 2005
- Recorded: 2005
- Genre: Rock; new wave; synth-pop
- Length: 38:32
- Label: Nitro
- Producer: Cameron Webb

The Aquabats chronology
Yo! Check Out This Ride! EP (2004)	Charge!! (2005)	Radio Down! (2010)

Alternate cover
- Special One-Year Anniversary Edition cover

Singles from Charge!!
- 1. "Fashion Zombies!" Released: April 1, 2005

Charge!! is the fourth studio album by American comedy rock band The Aquabats, released on June 7, 2005 by Nitro Records.

Following a nearly six year semi-hiatus which resulted in numerous line-up changes, Charge!! was The Aquabats' first studio album to showcase the band's radical shift in sound, featuring a reduced five-member line-up and a reinvented musical style of new wave-influenced rock and punk music. Released to largely positive reviews and several successful international tours, Charge!! effectively revitalized The Aquabats' then-stalling career into the new century.

== Overview ==
Following their dismissal from Goldenvoice Records in 2000, The Aquabats entered a lengthy period of relative inactivity, bringing much of their touring and recording plans to a standstill and resulting in the eventual departure of several of the band's key members, including the loss of their once prominent horn section. In 2004, The Aquabats independently released the EP Yo! Check Out This Ride! in an attempt to generate label interest, successfully signing to Nitro Records later in the year and commencing work on a new studio album in the fall. Despite this fortuitous turn of events, the band were still uncertain of their future following their semi-hiatus and radical shift in line-up. Singer Christian Jacobs (The MC Bat Commander) later commented that the band thought Charge! would possibly be their final album together.

While the lyricism of Charge!! continues in the typical Aquabats tradition of comedic self-referential narratives and pop culture and geek culture-oriented satire, the music introduced a bold new sound for the band, featuring a predominant focus on guitar and keyboard-driven rock, punk and Devo-influenced new wave rather than the ska-driven eclecticism of their earlier albums. Notably, Charge!! was the first Aquabats studio album not to feature brass instruments, indeed one of the most remarked upon aspects of the album by reviewers; in a 2006 interview, Jacobs stated that the band attempted to write a saxophone solo into one of the album's songs but ultimately felt it sounded too out of place.

Up until his return to the band in 2024 for their album Finally!, Charge! would be the last Aquabats album to feature longtime guitarist Corey Pollock (Chainsaw) as an official member, as he would eventually leave the band in 2006 as a result of their increased touring activity interfering with his day job. However, Pollock continued to frequently perform with the band live as a second guitarist and contributed guitar tracks to nearly all of their subsequent studio material.

== Release and promotion ==
On April 1, 2005, Charge!! was announced for release in two months' time. Alongside this, the album's track listing and artwork, and an MP3 of "Fashion Zombies" was posted online. They offered a contest that whoever could get their local radio station to play the song would win an all expenses paid dinner with The Aquabats. The prize was claimed after a fan got the song airtime on Los Angeles' KROQ-FM and was taken to a T.G.I. Friday's.

Charge!! planned for release on June 14, 2005 through Nitro Records, before it was released a week earlier on June 7. It charted modestly upon release, reaching #21 on Billboard's Top Heatseekers. Copies of the album were packaged with Aquabats trading cards featuring pictures of the band and song lyrics. Although the cards were produced in sets of thirteen, each CD came with only two, with an insert humorously instructing fans to buy more CDs in order to collect them all.

In promotion of the album, the music video for "Fashion Zombies!" was released online on July 13, 2005, and on September 23, 2005, The Aquabats made their debut appearance on national television on the G4 program Attack of the Show, performing "Fashion Zombies!" and "Nerd Alert!".

=== Touring ===
In June and July 2005, the Aquabats embarked on a twelve-week tour of the US, dubbed the Teenage Pajamas From Outer Space tour, which was supported by the Epoxies and the Phenomenauts. Following this, they toured in August 2005 with the Eyeliners, the Phenomenauts and Time Again. In October 2005, they supported the Offspring for nine shows in Japan, which was followed by the Good to Go Tour in the UK with Never Heard of It, Army of Freshmen and Sonic Boom Six. In December 2005, the band played a short series of holiday shows with Valient Thorr and Goons of Doom. In May 2006, following the album's reissue, the Aquabats went on the This Better Work Or We Are Dead Tour, with Streetlight Manifesto and No Trigger supporting the West Coast dates and Whole Wheat Bread and The Aggrolites supporting the East Coast. In January 2007, the band announced they were finally wrapping up their touring to start work on a new studio album, performing their "last" show at The Glass House club in Pomona on January 27, where they played Charge!! in its entirety.

== Reception ==
Professional ratings
Review scores
Source	Rating
Allmusic	4/5 stars
Alternative Press	4/5 stars
IGN	7.9/10
PopMatters	6/10
Punknews.org	4/5 stars

Critical reaction to Charge!! was generally positive, with many reviewers praising The Aquabats' transition in genre. Johnny Loftus of Allmusic gave the album four stars out of five, remarking that the band had "refocused its musical and ideological attack" during the six years since their previous studio album: "Intact are the pop references, zany in-jokes, and Batman villain fetishism...But Charge!! is much more rewarding musically. It doesn't loiter awkwardly between punk, pop, ska, and broad humor — it keeps the pressure on with a catchy guitar- and keyboard-driven blend of anthemic choruses and appropriately squawky elements." A review on IGN also complimented this shift in style, writing "The neo-new-wave result is superbly effective, especially considering the band's campy, Saturday-morning-cartoon feel."

Tim O'Neil of PopMatters also commented on the band's change of sound, writing that "The Aquabats' current strategic manifesto bears a strong resemblance to some of No Doubt's great late-period tactical accomplishments, especially on portions pertaining to the plague of 'Fashion Zombies!' and the propaganda manifesto 'Look at Me, I’m a Winner!'. Ironically, considering their near wholesale abandonment of the [ska] strategy, the greatest victory on Charge!! comes on the only battle to utilize the almost totally discredited Ska Force to full effect, the ebullient 'Waterslides!'" Jesse Raub of Punknews.org, though giving the album a four out of a possible five stars, lamented the album's lack of ska music but ultimately praised The Aquabats' humor, noting "I guess as long as the Aquabats are around, I won't be able to escape their siren song of goofiness. Strictly for the music, this album has the catchiest damn hooks I've heard in a long time. It's poppy as hell, and it definitely shows the progression of the band. You really are going to be missing out on a lot if you let this pass by you".

== Special One-Year Anniversary Edition ==
In June 2006, The Aquabats released a tongue-in-cheek "First Anniversary" re-issue of Charge!!, featuring three previously unreleased bonus tracks from the original recording sessions, a DVD and brand new album art by artist Brandon Bird. Printed in a limited run, the anniversary re-issue was made available only through The Aquabats' website and live shows.

=== DVD contents ===
- "How About Charge!!??", a 45-minute documentary on the making of the album, featuring a track-by-track commentary by The Aquabats.
- "Fashion Zombies!" music video, with optional audio commentary by The Aquabats and producer Justin Lyon.
- "Behind the Scenesters", behind-the-scenes footage of the making of the "Fashion Zombies!" music video.
- "Charge!! Photoshoot", behind-the-scenes footage of the album cover photo shoot.
- Charge!! web teasers, a collection of in-studio teaser trailers promoting the album.
- Trading card photo gallery

== Track listing ==
All songs written by The Aquabats.

No.	Title	Length
1.	"Now, Stand Back for Your Own Safety!"	0:06
2.	"Fashion Zombies!"	3:16
3.	"Stuck in a Movie!"	2:48
4.	"Tiger Rider vs. the Time Sprinkler!"	2:25
5.	"Nerd Alert!"	3:14
6.	"Plastic Lips!"	2:42
7.	"Look at Me (I'm a Winner)!"	3:35
8.	"Hot Summer Nights (Won't Last Forever)!"	3:49
9.	"Meltdown!"	3:38
10.	"Mechanical Ape!"	3:06
11.	"Demolition Rickshaw!"	3:14
12.	"Waterslides!"	3:48
13.	"Awesome Forces!"	2:51

Special One-Year Anniversary Edition
No.	Title	Length
14.	"Cheeseburger Politics!"	2:45
15.	"Video Nite!"	2:56
16.	"Hi-Five City!"	2:48

== Charts ==
Chart (2005)	Peak position
US Heatseekers Albums (Billboard)	21
US Independent Albums (Billboard)	30

== Personnel ==
=== The Aquabats ===
- The MC Bat Commander – vocals
- Crash McLarson – bass, vocals
- Chainsaw – "viking axe" guitar
- Jimmy the Robot – keyboards, vocals
- Ricky Fitness – drums, percussion, sequencing, vocals

=== Production ===
- Produced, engineered and mixed by Cameron Webb.
- Mastered by Gene Grimaldi at Oasis Mastering, Studio City, California.
- Recorded at Maple Studios in Santa Ana, California and Grandmaster Recorders in Hollywood, California.
