= James Briggs (musician) =

American multi-instrumentalist (b. 1978)

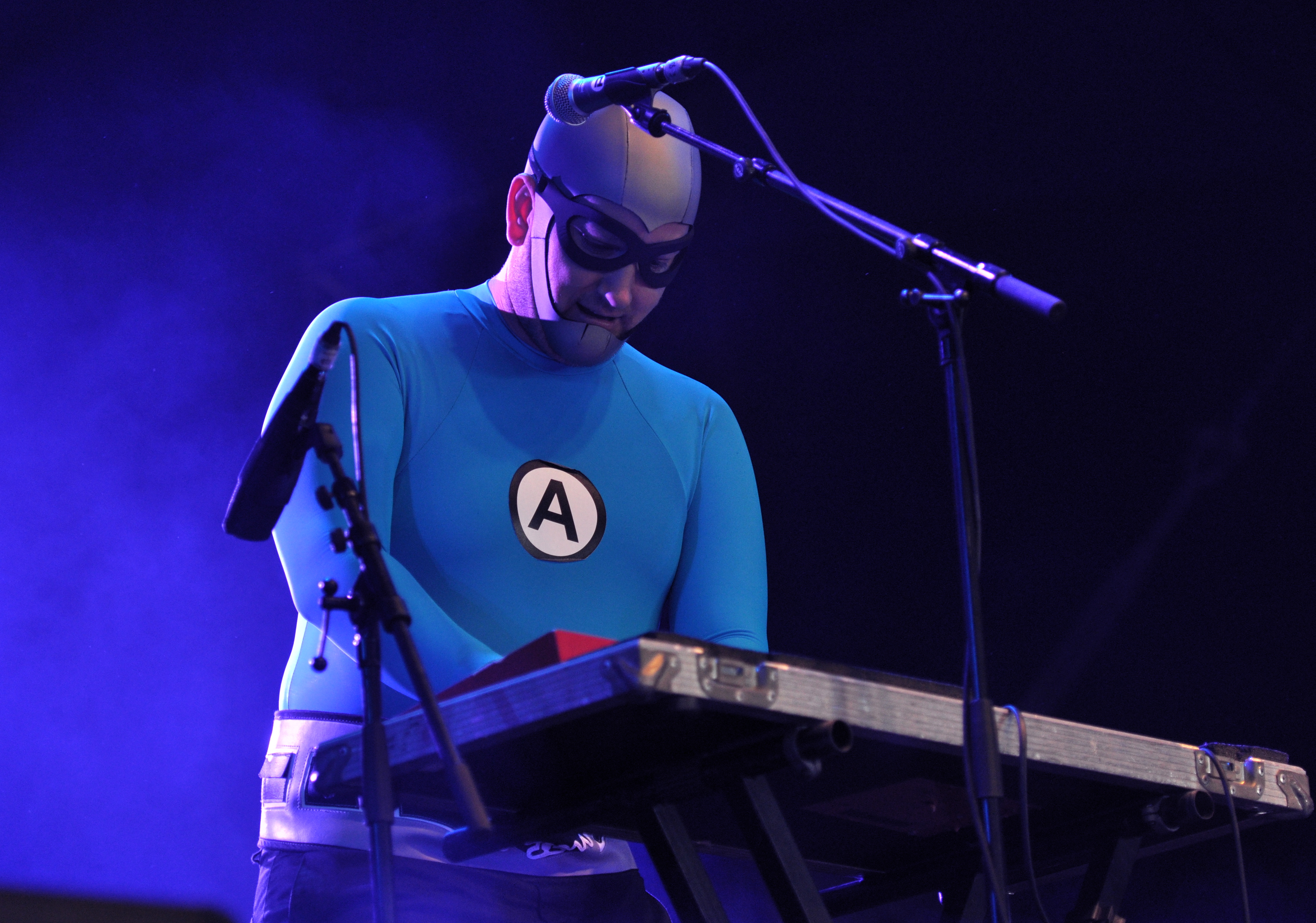
- Briggs performing with The Aquabats in April 2013.

Background information
- Also known as: Jimmy the Robot
- Born: James Randall Briggs Jr. February 27, 1978 (age 48); San Bernardino County, California, U.S.
- Genres: Rock, new wave, ska, synthpop
- Occupations: Musician, numismatist
- Instruments: Keyboards, synthesizer, tenor saxophone, woodwinds
- Years active: 1996–present

James Randall Briggs Jr. (born February 27, 1978), credited professionally as James R. Briggs Jr., is an American musician and multi-instrumentalist, best known as the keyboardist and saxophonist for the California rock band The Aquabats, of which he has been a member since 1996 under the stage name and persona of Jimmy the Robot. Briggs also portrayed this role on The Aquabats' 2012-2014 television series The Aquabats! Super Show! and again on its 2019 YouTube revival series The Aquabats! RadVentures!.

== Biography ==
Briggs joined The Aquabats in 1996, at the age of 18. In addition to keyboards, Briggs also contributed tenor saxophone to much of the band's music, up until the departure of trumpeters Catboy and Prince Adam in the early 2000s led to the band's decision to continue without a horn section, transitioning Briggs' role in the band entirely to keyboards and synthesizers, performing solo saxophone parts only on select songs for The Aquabats' live shows.

Briggs' original stage name, as credited in the liner notes for The Fury of The Aquabats!, was "Jaime the Robot", "Jaime" being a Spanish-language twist on the name Jimmy, given to him by fellow Aquabat Catboy. In 1998, while The Aquabats were developing a television pilot with Buena Vista Television, Briggs' name was changed to simply "The Robot" to avoid copyright issues with the Get Smart character Hymie the Robot. Briggs kept this title until 2004, when it was changed to his current stage name.

Outside of his work with The Aquabats, Briggs has contributed saxophone to several albums by the indie pop band Bikeride featuring former Aquabats members Adam Deibert and Charles Gray, as well as having contributed saxophone to the Rx Bandits' 1997 debut Those Damn Bandits. Outside of The Aquabats, Briggs works for his family's rare coin store, Briggs and Coops, in Redlands, California.

== Discography ==
=== The Aquabats ===
- The Fury of the Aquabats! (1997) - alto, tenor and baritone saxophones, clarinet, piano, vocals, Clavinova, Mellotron, flute
- The Aquabats vs. the Floating Eye of Death! (1999) - woodwinds, keyboards, vocals
- Myths, Legends and Other Amazing Adventures, Vol. 2 (2000) - keyboards, woodwinds
- Yo! Check Out This Ride! EP (2004) - keyboards, backing vocals
- Charge!! (2005) - keyboards, vocals
- Radio Down! (2010) - keyboards, backing vocals
- Hi-Five Soup! (2011) - keyboards, backing vocals
- The Aquabats! Super Show! Television Soundtrack: Volume One (2019) - keyboards, lead and backing vocals
- Kooky Spooky...In Stereo (2020) - keyboards, saxophone, backing vocals
- Finally! (2024) - saxophone, keyboards, vocals, other percussion

=== Bikeride ===
- Thirty-Seven Secrets I Only Told America (1999) - tenor sax (as Randall J. Briggs)
- Summer Winners, Summer Losers (2000) - saxophone (as Randall J. Briggs)
- Morning Macumba (2002) - clarinet, saxophone, backing vocals (as Randall J. Briggs)

=== Miscellaneous ===
- The Pharmaceutical Bandits - Those Damn Bandits (1997) - saxophone (as Randy Briggs)
