= The Aquabats =

American rock band

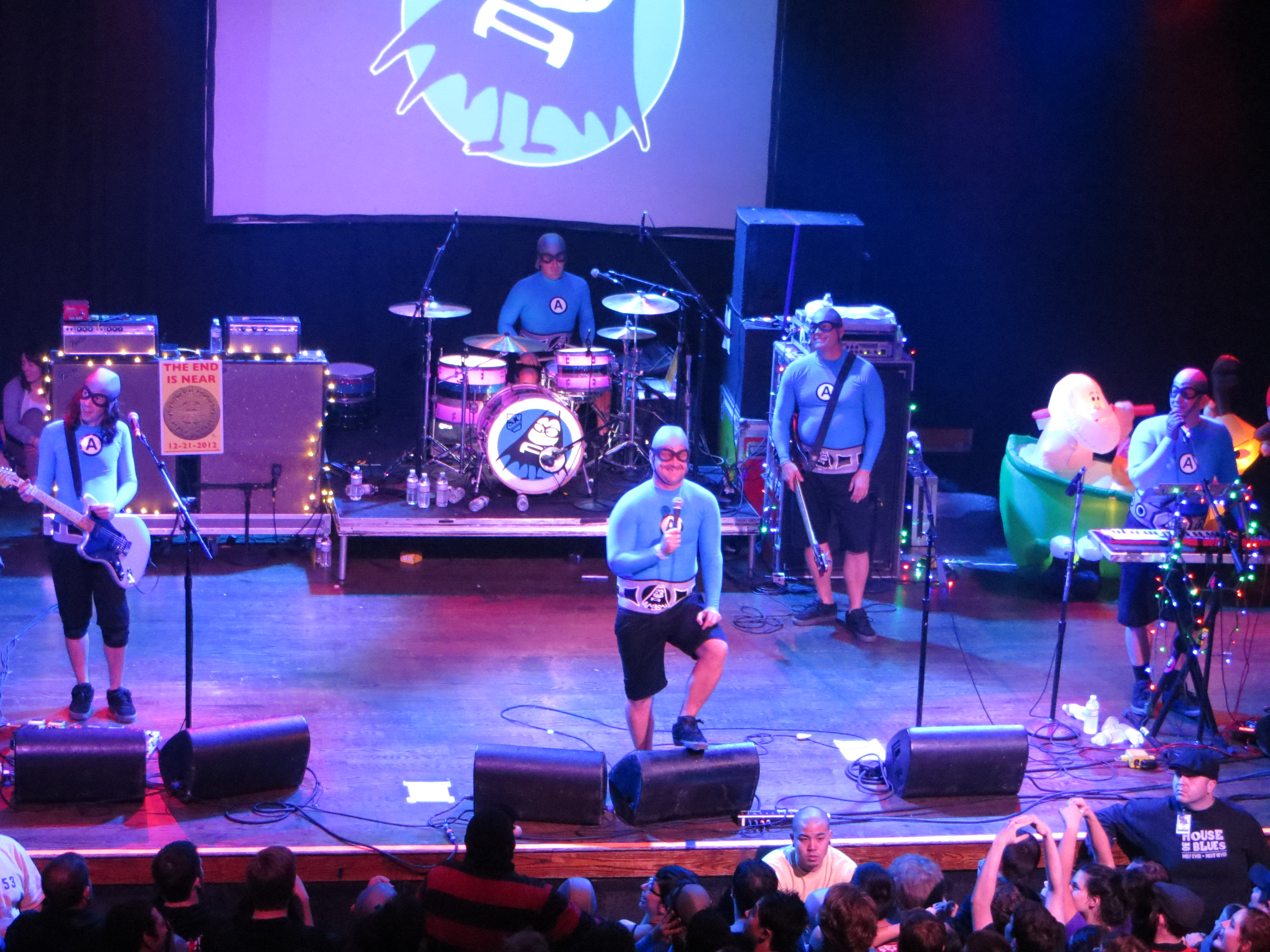
- The Aquabats performing in Anaheim, California, in December 2012

Background information
- Origin: Huntington Beach, California, U.S.
- Genres: Comedy rock; pop-punk; ska punk; new wave; power pop
- Works: The Aquabats discography
- Years active: 1994–present
- Labels: Horchata; Goldenvoice; Time Bomb; Fearless; Nitro; Gloopy
- Spinoffs: The Sandfleas; Moon Monkeys; Digital Unicorn; The Goodwin Club
- Spinoff of: GOGO13
- Members: The MC Bat Commander; Crash McLarson; Eaglebones Falconhawk; Jimmy the Robot; Ricky Fitness; For an exhaustive list of members please see the extended lineup list
- Past members: See: The Aquabats former members
- Website: theaquabats.com

The Aquabats are an American rock band formed in Huntington Beach, California, in 1994. Throughout many fluctuations in the group's lineup, singer the MC Bat Commander and bassist Crash McLarson have remained the band's two constant fixtures. As of 2026, the Aquabats' main lineup consists of saxophonist and keyboardist Jimmy the Robot, drummer Ricky Fitness, and guitarist Eaglebones Falconhawk. During live performances, the band frequently expands its roster, with regular contributors including guitarist Chainsaw, the Prince of Karate, trumpeter Cat Boy, and keyboardist Gorney.

Easily identified by their masks and matching costumes, the Aquabats are perhaps most recognized for their comedic persona in which they claim to be crime-fighting superheroes. This theme serves as subject for much of the band's music and as part of their theatrical stage shows, which typically feature various stunts and fight scenes with costumed villains and monsters. Musically, the Aquabats have continuously evolved over the course of their career, initially starting as a ska band before reinventing themselves in the early 2000s as a new wave–influenced rock band. The band's current musical style mixes rock and punk with elements of new wave, ska and synth-pop.

The Aquabats have released seven studio albums, three extended plays, two compilation albums and one soundtrack album, among other recordings. To date, three of the Aquabats' albums have charted on the Billboard 200: 1997's The Fury of The Aquabats!, 2011's Hi-Five Soup! and 2019's The Aquabats! Super Show! Television Soundtrack: Volume One. The Aquabats' seventh studio album, Finally!, was released on June 21, 2024.

From 2012 to 2014, the Aquabats also created and starred in The Aquabats! Super Show!, a live-action musical action-comedy television series which aired on American cable channel The Hub. The series ran for three seasons, earning a total of eight Daytime Emmy Award nominations and ultimately winning one. Following a successful Kickstarter campaign, the series was independently revived as a YouTube series from 2019 to 2025.

== History ==
=== Formation ===
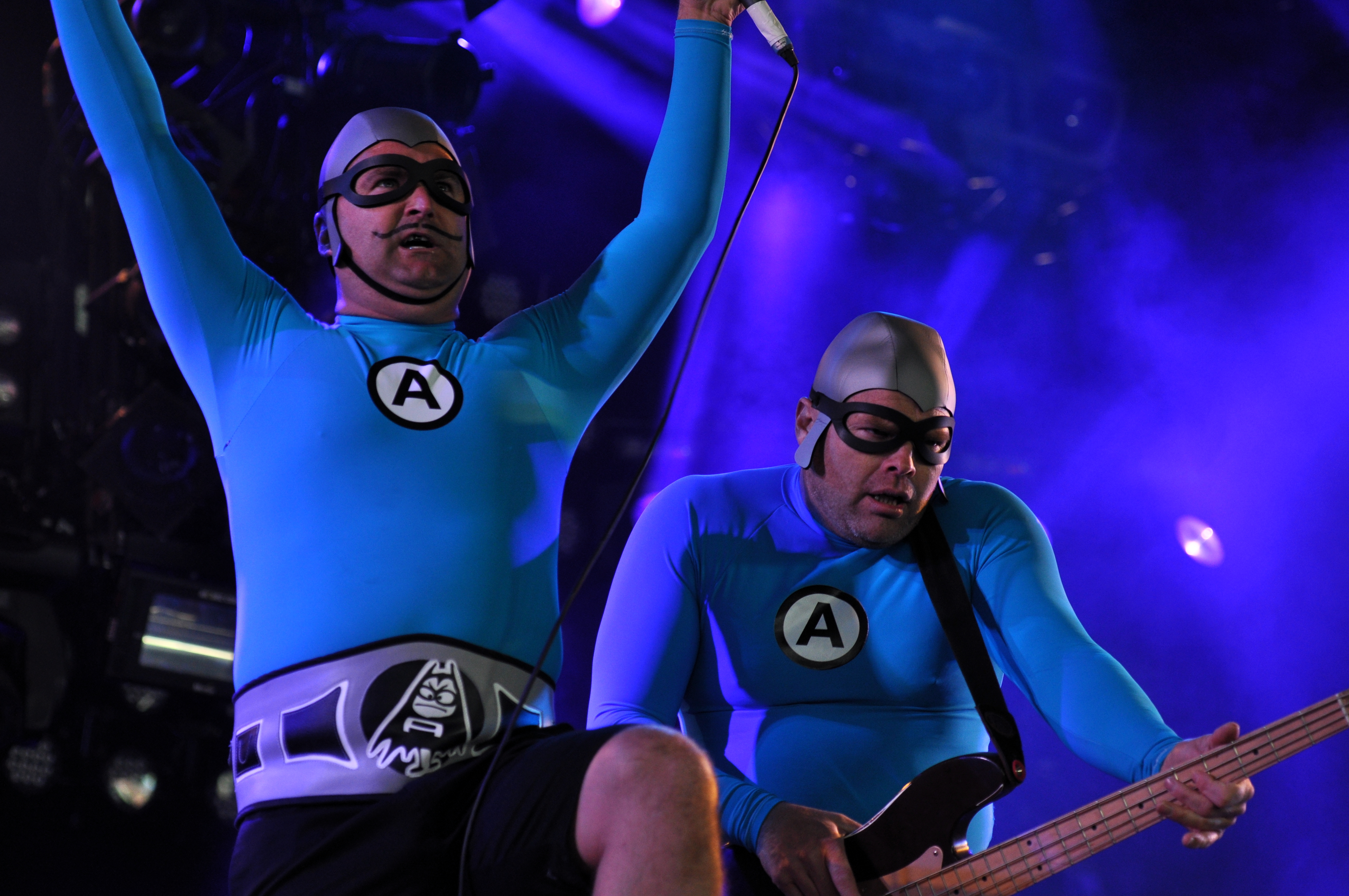
Singer Christian Jacobs and bassist Chad Larson (pictured above in 2013) formed the Aquabats with former trumpeter Boyd Terry as a joke band in 1994.

In the early 1990s, musicians Christian Jacobs, Chad Larson and Boyd Terry met and befriended each other while living in Brea, California. Having all been active in various local punk and alternative rock bands, the three eventually conceived the idea of forming a joke band satirizing the Orange County punk scene, which Jacobs described at the time as being overwhelmed with "testosterone, beer and people fighting". The concept was to start an unabashedly silly punk band as a complete antithesis to the genre's more aggressive and humorless bands, with the intention of performing at punk shows to poke fun at the scene. While later attending a ska show in Orange County, Jacobs was exposed to the area's burgeoning ska scene and was impressed by its ethos: as he recalled, "No one was fighting or pushing each other but having a good time". It was then decided that they would start a ska band instead, "to be part of the fun".

With Jacobs assuming vocal duties, Larson on bass guitar and Terry on trumpet, the band also featured Matt Van Gundy on guitar, Rod Arellano on Drums and Chad Parkin on keyboards. Each member of the original line-up had musical backgrounds in various genres, including ska, punk, surf and new wave, all elements which were incorporated into the band's music and aesthetic: for example, the name "The Aquabats" was created to sound like a classic surf band, while a shared admiration of Devo inspired the idea of matching costumes. Jacobs simply recalled in a 2013 interview, "We wanted to combine Devo with surf music and ska". Rehearsing only once in a house Jacobs and Larson shared at the time, The Aquabats played their first show a mere week after forming at a house party in August 1994. Larson remembered this show as merely "a joke...we weren't trying to be a band. We were trying to have fun". Nevertheless, encouraged by a positive audience reception, The Aquabats started performing more local shows, soon becoming familiar faces within the Orange County underground.

=== 1994–1996: early years ===
With professionalism far from foremost concern, The Aquabats' earliest band line-ups changed with almost every concert, occasionally featuring as many as twelve to fourteen musicians at a time onstage, with the majority typically playing brass instruments. As they gradually developed a steady following and began playing shows with more regularity, the band settled into a tighter and more manageable unit consisting of around eight to nine musicians, filled out by a horn section, two guitarists and a keyboardist. It was with this type of line-up that The Aquabats began recording, independently producing the demo tapes The Revenge of the Midget Punchers in 1994 and Bat Boy in 1995.

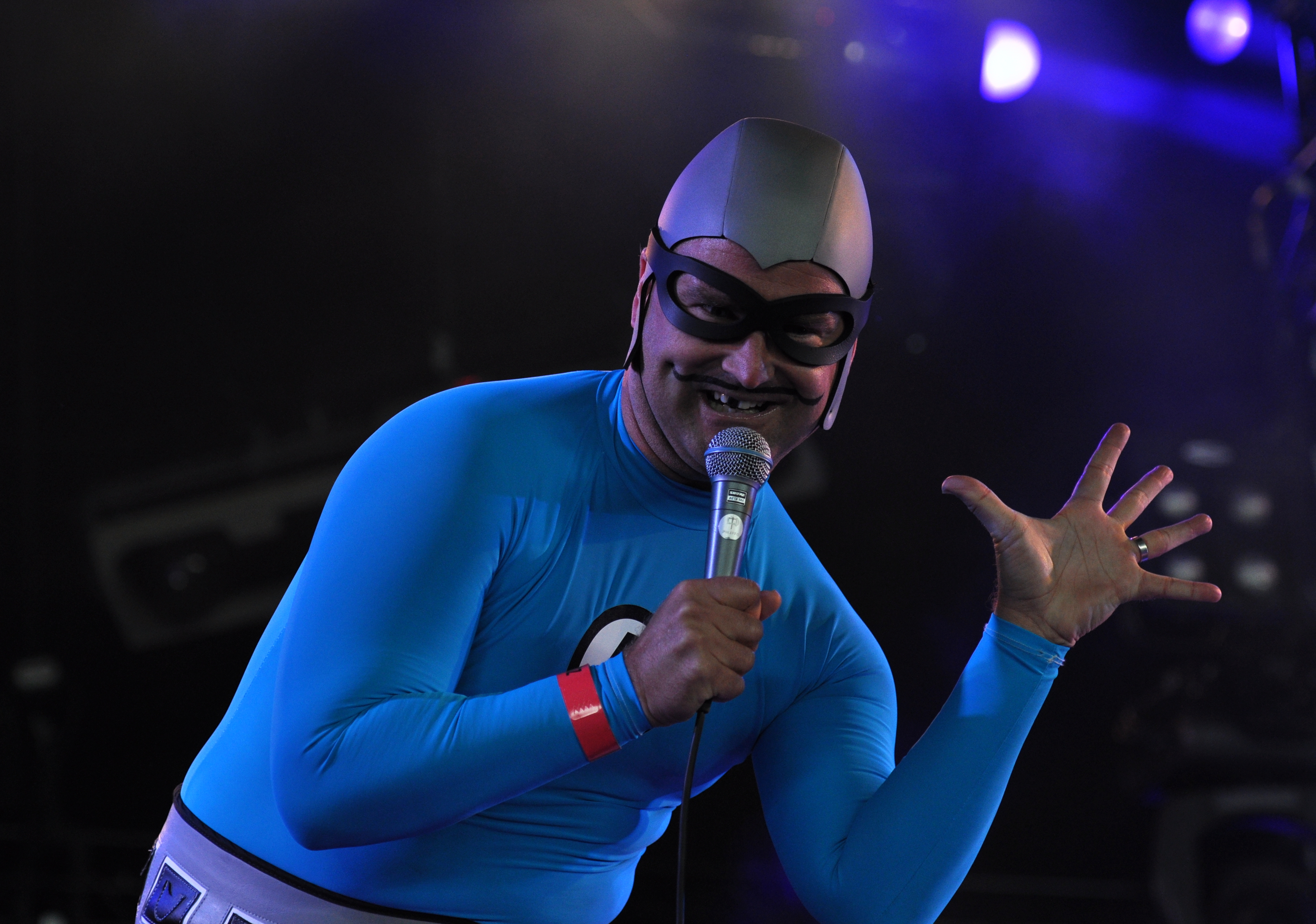
As part of the band's superhero image, each member of The Aquabats adopted a stage name and backstory. Christian Jacobs' alter ego is "The MC Bat Commander", whose trademark look includes a drawn-on mustache and blacked-out tooth.

Initially, The Aquabats intended to make each of their performances unique by wearing a different set of matching costumes for every concert, ranging from chef's uniforms to grass skirts and fezzes, all with an individual persona — during one show wearing chef outfits, for instance, the band hosted an actual onstage barbecue. When the group's props and get-ups soon became more cumbersome to transport than their musical equipment, it was ultimately decided a singular costume was required. Terry, a future apparel designer who was employed by the wetsuit manufacturing company Aleeda at the time, acquired a large amount of spare rubber and neoprene and fashioned together a set of helmets and rashguards for the band members. The addition of customized vinyl belts, donated to the band by then-unknown artist Paul Frank, effectively completed the style The Aquabats would maintain for the rest of their career.

To accompany their distinct new uniforms, The Aquabats constructed a backstory which alleged they were actually superheroes hailing from the distant island of "Aquabania", though Larson admits the entire mythology was simply made up piece by piece as they went along from one interviewer to the next. As their mythology grew, the members soon adopted superhero stage names and identities, and began tailoring their live shows around a comic book aesthetic by incorporating onstage stunts and mock battles with costumed villains, antics which were originally ploys to get the band's friends into shows for free. Jacobs' brothers Parker and Tyler, a cartoonist and graphic artist, respectively, were brought in to help develop the band's cartoon-influenced visual style, designing their logos and promotional material as well as playing characters in The Aquabats' stage shows and mythology.

In 1995, The Aquabats independently produced and recorded their debut album, The Return of The Aquabats, pressing the CDs themselves. Having already amassed a sizable cult following for their live shows, the band managed to sell 20,000 copies of their album without any marketing or distribution. With the growing mainstream popularity of ska music, The Aquabats quickly rose to prominence within Orange County's booming ska scene, regularly touring alongside the likes of bands such as No Doubt, Sublime and Reel Big Fish and bringing them to the brink of achieving mainstream recognition.

=== 1996–1998: The Fury of The Aquabats! and mainstream breakthrough ===
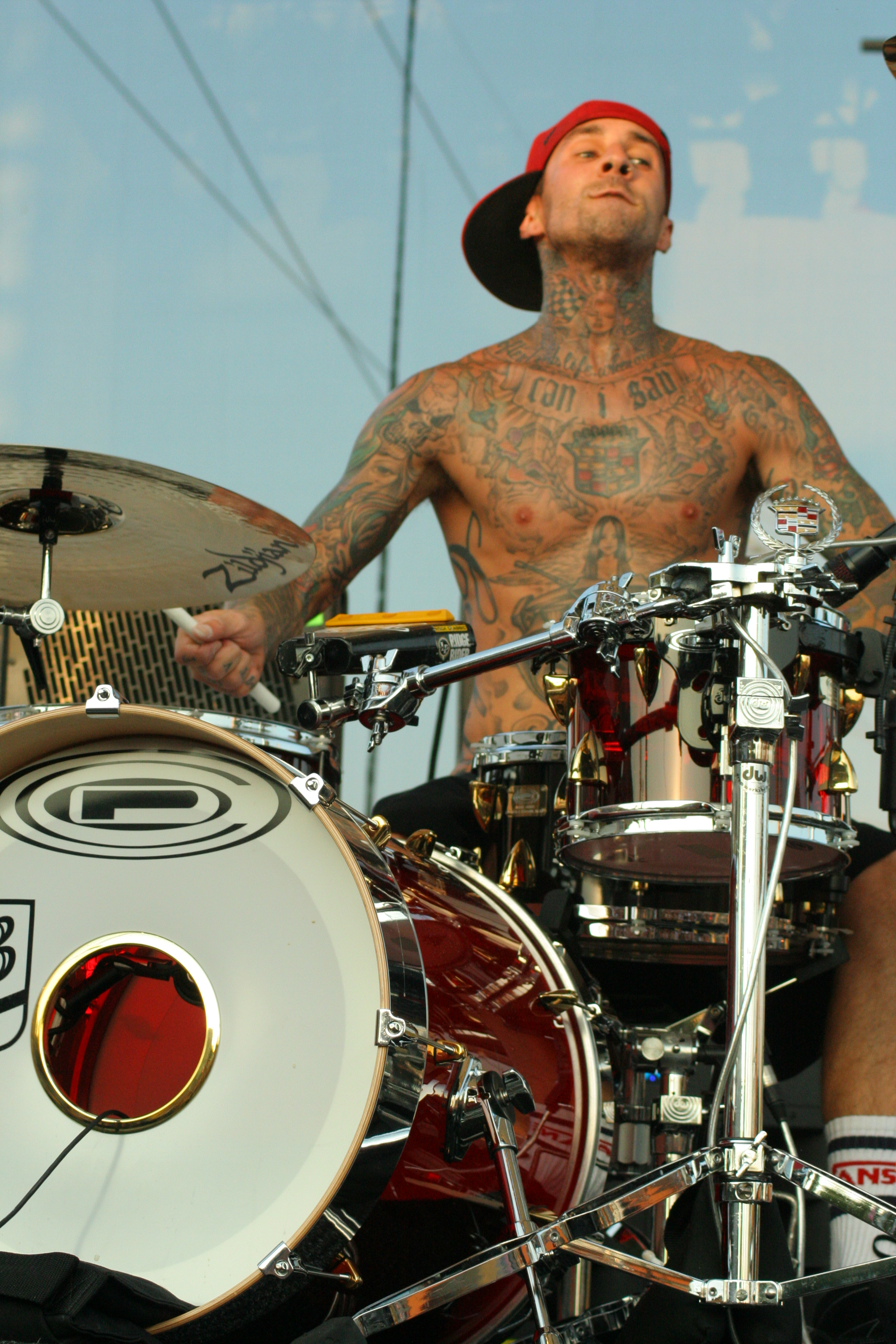
Drummer Travis Barker was a member of The Aquabats during their commercial peak in 1997 and 1998, before leaving to join pop punk band Blink-182.

By late 1996, propelled by the multi-platinum success of No Doubt and Sublime, ska had broken through into the American mainstream to become one of the most popular forms of alternative music. With record labels now turning their attention towards ska bands, The Aquabats were promptly signed to Goldenvoice Records and released their second album, The Fury of The Aquabats!, in October 1997 through Time Bomb Recordings. While still predominantly a ska album, The Fury showcased a more ambitious musical streak than The Return, incorporating stronger elements of punk and surf, as well as featuring instrumentals, parodies of ragtime and tango music, and a variety of unconventional instruments including sousaphones and banjos. Released at the commercial height of the American ska revival, The Fury earned The Aquabats minor mainstream success, peaking at number 172 on the Billboard 200 and number 12 on its Top Heatseekers, while lead single "Super Rad!" found regular airplay on MTV and Los Angeles' influential KROQ-FM. On July 25, 1998, they fought the alien rock band Gwar during The Ska Parade.

The Aquabats spent 1997 and 1998 touring extensively behind The Fury, carrying out both supporting and headlining tours of the United States and traveling internationally as part of the 1998 Warped Tour. By this time, the band had settled into a stable touring line-up of Jacobs (The Bat Commander), Larson (Crash McLarson), Terry (Catboy), drummer Travis Barker (The Baron Von Tito), guitarists Charles Gray (Ultra Kyu) and Courtney Pollock (Chainsaw, the Prince of Karate), trumpeter Adam Deibert (Prince Adam) and keyboardist/saxophonist James Briggs (Jaime the Robot, later Jimmy the Robot). This line-up would last The Aquabats up until 1998, when, in the middle of a tour with pop punk trio Blink-182, Blink unexpectedly fired their drummer Scott Raynor and recruited Barker as a last-minute replacement to sit in for the rest of the tour. By the tour's close, the band was so impressed with Barker's performance that they invited him to join Blink-182 as a full-time member, an offer which Barker accepted, amicably parting ways with The Aquabats. Barker was succeeded by Gabe Palmer (Doctor Rock), solidifying a line-up which would last the remainder of the decade.

With the band now finding enough success to generate both an adequate income and media visibility, Jacobs — a former child actor with ties in the entertainment industry — began to conceive the idea of adapting The Aquabats' superhero mythology into a television series. After pitching the concept to several networks, Buena Vista Television eventually agreed to help produce a short live-action pilot in 1998, directed by comedian Bobcat Goldthwait. Titled simply The Aquabats!, the pilot followed the fictional misadventures of the eight band members in an intentionally campy style similar to Saturday morning cartoon shows. The pilot, which has yet to be made available for public viewing, failed to attract any network interest and was later openly disowned by the band themselves.

=== 1998–2004: change in genre, career decline and semi-hiatus ===
By the time The Aquabats began writing new material for their next studio album in 1998, the group had begun to feel pigeonholed by their public status as a "cheesy ska band" and consciously decided to start exploring more diverse musical styles rather than merely returning to a ska-based sound. As such, the band's third album, The Aquabats vs. the Floating Eye of Death!, marked an abrupt stylistic shift, completely abandoning the ska rhythms which dominated their previous albums in favor of more punk and new wave-influenced textures, emphasizing guitar and synthesizer-driven melodies over brass and woodwinds. With the total absence of The Aquabats' formerly marketable ska sound, Goldenvoice expressed mixed feelings over Floating Eye, reportedly telling the band that the album had no potential single material and would be difficult to promote. In a 2005 interview, Larson retrospectively lamented upon Floating Eye's lack of a commercial sound, noting that while he and the band felt the material was strong, it "probably wasn't the record we should have put out at that time".

True to their predictions, Floating Eye failed to match the commercial success of its predecessor, charting only at a mere 35 on Billboard's Top Heatseekers. Despite the album's underwhelming performance, Goldenvoice nevertheless granted The Aquabats a small budget for a music video, which the band instead used to film a five-minute promotional video as another prospective television pilot, The Aquabats! In Color!, an action-oriented series styled similarly to Japanese tokusatsu shows. Despite potential interest from the Fox Family Channel prior to their acquisition by Disney which cancelled all development deals, the pilot again failed to generate any interest, bringing The Aquabats' career to a standstill.

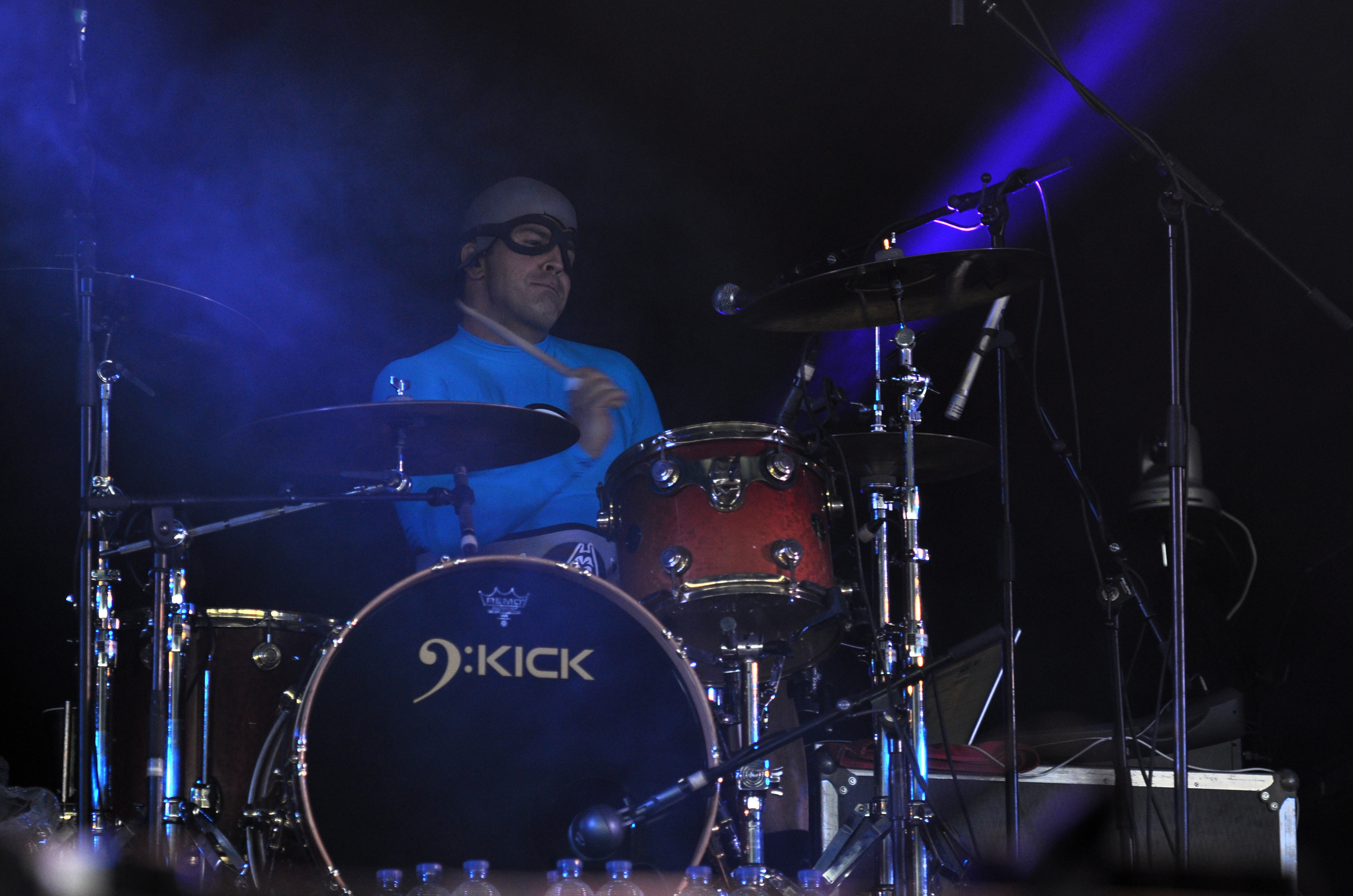
Ricky Falomir (Ricky Fitness) joined the band during their career lull in 2002, eventually serving the longest tenure of any Aquabats drummer.

Following the huge financial losses Goldenvoice suffered from the inaugural Coachella Valley Music and Arts Festival in 1999, the company was eventually forced to cease operations, leaving The Aquabats without a record label. After an unsuccessful search for a new label, the band eventually turned to the Internet to independently manage and promote themselves while the members resumed their day jobs to continue funding the band. Jacobs likened the experience to a superhero's alter ego, working by day and fighting crime [read: being an Aquabat] by night. While The Aquabats could not secure a proper recording contract, the band did negotiate a distribution deal with Fearless Records, releasing a collection of outtakes and demos from the Floating Eye sessions entitled Myths, Legends, and Other Amazing Adventures, Vol. 2 before slipping back into a period of relative inactivity.

With a lack of label support leaving the band to finance themselves entirely out of pocket, The Aquabats indefinitely postponed all plans for future recording or extensive touring, limiting their activity primarily to sporadic shows in the southwest United States. The loss of touring income, coupled with the band members' return to their jobs and families, eventually contributed to the departure of several key members: in 2000, guitarist Gray left the band, followed by Palmer and co-founder Terry in 2002. To avoid the financial constraints of hiring two new members, Adam Deibert assumed a dual role as trumpeter and guitarist for the band's live shows, while Palmer was replaced by former Assorted Jelly Beans drummer Ricky Falomir (Ricky Fitness). With this more stable and compact line-up, The Aquabats returned to the studio to record original music for Evan Dorkin's Welcome to Eltingville, a 2002 animated television pilot which aired on Adult Swim but was ultimately not picked up as a series. The following year, the band would release their first DVD, Serious Awesomeness!, featuring a full live performance filmed in Pomona, California, and numerous clips spanning their entire career.

In 2004, with almost five years passed since having released any official studio material, The Aquabats independently recorded and released the five-track EP Yo! Check Out This Ride! as an attempt to both satisfy the band's fanbase and serve as a potential demo to attract interest from record labels. As their first recording with only six members and no use of a horn section, Yo! Check Out This Ride! marked the most drastic shift yet in The Aquabats' sound, taking the band even further into keyboard-driven rock and new wave-influenced songwriting. This would also mark Deibert's final recording with the band, as he would officially retire from the group later in the year, reducing The Aquabats to a quintet.

=== 2004–2009: Charge!! and renewed success ===
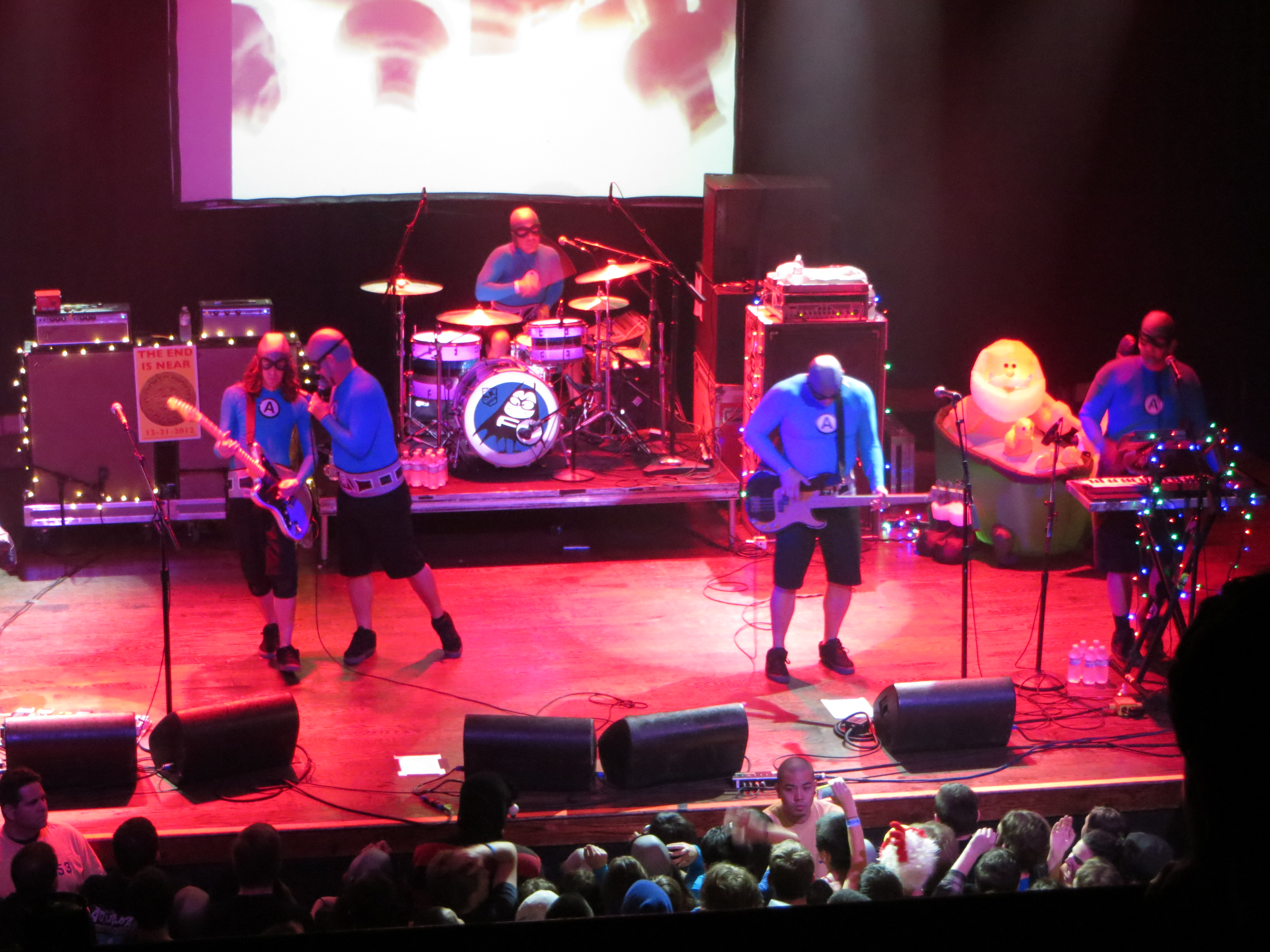
The departure of Adam Deibert in 2004 left The Aquabats a five-piece, effectively changing the band's sound and setting the stage for their career rejuvenation with Charge!!.

In the summer of 2004, The Aquabats were signed to independent label Nitro Records and began work on a new studio album in the fall. Despite this fortuitous turn of events, the group were still uncertain of their future following their semi-hiatus and radical shift in line-up; Jacobs later admitted that the band spent the recording sessions under the belief that it could possibly be their last album. After several months of production and much online hype, The Aquabats released their fourth album, Charge!!, on July 7, 2005. Continuing with the direction set by Yo! Check Out This Ride!, Charge!! was a bold introduction to The Aquabats' new musical style of guitar-driven, new wave-influenced rock.

Released to a largely positive critical reception with many critics praising the band's shift in genre, Charge!! effectively revitalized The Aquabats' career as the band recommitted themselves to regular touring. Days after the album's release, The Aquabats headlined a successful 34-city tour of the United States with similarly theatrical bands The Epoxies and The Phenomenauts, followed by tours of the United Kingdom and Japan, the latter supporting Nitro Records founders The Offspring. On September 23, 2005, The Aquabats made their national television debut on the G4 program Attack of the Show, performing Charge!!'s lead single, "Fashion Zombies!".

While the following year would present even more lucrative touring opportunities for The Aquabats, the band's renewed success would also have its drawbacks. In May 2006, it was announced that guitarist Pollock had reluctantly departed the group after 12 years, claiming the band's increased touring activity was conflicting with his business schedule. Pollock was succeeded by former Death by Stereo member Ian Fowles (Eaglebones Falconhawk), though he would continue to contribute guitar tracks to The Aquabats' studio albums and perform with the band as a second guitarist for their southern California concerts and major festival shows. After releasing a limited-print tongue-in-cheek "One Year Anniversary Edition" of Charge!!, The Aquabats carried out another national tour before announcing a brief hiatus in January 2007 to focus on writing their next album.

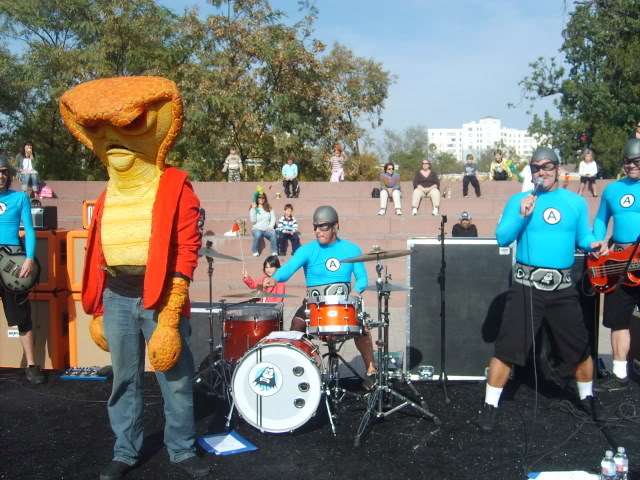
"Cobraman" crashes a show in 2008. Costumed characters are staples of The Aquabats' concerts, appearing as part of mock fights or comedic skits.

During this period, Jacobs had been pursuing a career in television production with his creative partner and longtime Aquabats collaborator Scott Schultz, independently filming prospective pilots for family television shows. In 2007, Jacobs and Schultz successfully sold one of their pilots, a preschooler show called Yo Gabba Gabba!, to Viacom's Nick Jr. Channel. As a musically oriented program, Yo Gabba Gabba! featured several guest appearances by The Aquabats, appearing onscreen performing both old and new songs and starring in various sketches. The series went on to become an award-winning international sensation, bringing a generous amount of media attention towards both Jacobs and The Aquabats, just enough to persuade Gabba's production company Wild Brain to help produce a new pilot again based on the band.

Shot on location throughout California in early 2008, The Aquabats' third television pilot, titled The Aquabats! Super Show!, was a fully realized half-hour episode featuring both live-action and animated storylines starring and featuring original music by the band. The Aquabats spent the remainder of 2008 heavily promoting the Super Show! pilot through extensive viral advertising and further touring, including appearances at the 2008 San Diego Comic-Con, where the pilot was publicly debuted for fans, high-profile festivals including the Bamboozle Left and Groezrock in April 2009, and opening for Blink-182 on two dates of their 2009 reunion tour.

Though The Aquabats continued to be a popular touring draw, the band experienced a tumultuous period of pre-production on their proposed fifth studio album lasting for nearly two years. Though a July 2007 news update announced that preliminary recording had already begun, no new material ever surfaced from these sessions or was ever performed live. As the band resumed touring throughout the United States and Europe, fewer updates were reported on the album's progress until all plans were abruptly ceased in April 2009, when The Aquabats were dropped from Nitro Records due to "trying economic times and a struggling musical landscape", according to Jacobs. With a glum confirmation of "no record company, no record", The Aquabats' future seemed once again shadowed in doubt.

=== 2009–2014: Hi-Five Soup! and The Aquabats! Super Show! ===
Despite the lack of a record label, The Aquabats continued to tour internationally throughout 2009, 2010 and 2011, headlining tours of the United States and the United Kingdom, as well as appearing at the 2010 Soundwave festival in Australia — the band's first ever visit to the continent. In August 2010, The Aquabats suddenly announced on their website that they would be independently releasing their next studio album in November of that year. However, following a last-minute distribution deal with Fearless Records, the album's release date was postponed to 2011 to provide for proper marketing and promotion, and an EP containing its first single, Radio Down!, was released in its place. Hi-Five Soup!, The Aquabats' fifth full-length album, was released on January 18, 2011, becoming the band's highest-charting album since The Fury, debuting at number 181 on the Billboard 200 and number 5 on Top Heatseekers. In promotion of the album, the band embarked on a 21-city national tour supporting Reel Big Fish, followed by a performance at the 2011 Coachella Valley Music and Arts Festival.

On March 24, 2011, it was formally announced via press release that The Aquabats! Super Show! had been acquired as a series by family cable channel The Hub, a joint venture between Hasbro and Discovery which launched in 2010 as a replacement for Discovery Kids. Created and produced by Jacobs, Schultz and Jason deVilliers, the series followed the fictionalized adventures of The Aquabats in a deliberately campy style inspired by the 1960s Batman TV series, mixing live-action storylines with cartoon shorts, parody commercials and musical interludes featuring new original music and songs written and performed by the band.

After spending the majority of 2011 in production, the first season of The Aquabats! Super Show! ran for thirteen episodes from March 3, 2012, to June 16, 2012, meeting with a largely positive critical reception and consistently high ratings for the modestly sized channel, eventually earning a Daytime Emmy nomination for Outstanding Children's Series, which it ultimately lost to fellow Hub series R. L. Stine's The Haunting Hour. In October 2012, production began on the series' second season, which premiered on June 1, 2013, with a short run of five episodes. The following October, three additional episodes were filmed, though The Hub later explicitly referred to these episodes as "specials" rather than a continuation of season two. These three specials aired from December 21, 2013, to January 14, 2014.

In a Huffington Post feature on the band prior to the 2014 San Diego Comic-Con, Jacobs revealed that The Hub had opted not to renew The Aquabats! Super Show! for another season following extensive network rebranding by Hasbro and Discovery, effectively canceling the series. Jacobs admitted he was surprised by this turn of events, noting "Everything we heard was that the show has been a real Cinderella story for the Hub and that it was rating really well with viewers. We just assumed that we'd eventually go back into production or at least get picked up for Season 3", but ultimately concluded "it is what it is" in regard to the network's decision.

=== 2014–2018: continued touring and anniversary shows ===
Since the 2012 premiere of The Aquabats! Super Show!, The Aquabats largely cut back on extensive touring in order to accommodate their television production schedule, once again limiting their live shows to occasional performances within the Southwestern United States. In April 2013, the band carried out a six-show tour of Europe and the United Kingdom, concluding with an appearance at the Groezrock punk rock festival in Belgium. The following June, The Aquabats were once again featured on the Warped Tour, though only played eight shows in the Southwest region. Despite playing a limited portion of the tour, the band were regularly featured on the second season of Fuse's Warped Roadies, a reality series documenting the road crew of the Warped Tour, where they were most notably the subject of one episode in which they incur the wrath of a stage manager for repeatedly playing over their set times.

On March 17, 2014, in celebration of their 20th anniversary as a band, The Aquabats announced the first leg of their "20th Anniversary Tour" for May, their first extensive headlining United States tour in years, covering fifteen shows in nine states on the East Coast. The following July, the band carried out five more dates across California, Washington and Oregon, then announced eleven more dates covering six states across the western half of the country.

Following another stretch of relative inactivity for most of 2015 and 2016, The Aquabats announced a 13-date tour of the American Midwest and East Coast in May 2017, supported by Reggie and the Full Effect, C. J. Ramone and Kepi Ghoulie, subsequently followed by a six-date tour of the West Coast in October with Dog Party. Ticket options for these shows included "Super Rad Packages" with bonus exclusive merchandise, most notably a split 7" single of full-length versions of the Super Show! songs "Burger Rain" and "Beat Fishin'", The Aquabats' first new studio recordings since 2011's Hi-Five Soup. In mid-February 2018, The Aquabats played nine dates in the United Kingdom with Army of Freshmen supporting Bowling for Soup on their "Get Happy!" tour.

In celebration of the 20th anniversary of 1997's The Fury of The Aquabats!, the band worked with veteran producer and engineer Cameron Webb on a complete remaster of the album which was independently released on vinyl and CD with bonus material on April 6, 2018. The following day, The Aquabats played two sold-out shows at Los Angeles' Fonda Theater where they performed The Fury of The Aquabats! in its entirety, joined by former members Pollock, Terry and Deibert. Notably, Travis Barker appeared during the evening show to play three songs as his Baron von Tito persona, marking the first time Barker had performed with the band since 1998. Three weeks later on April 28, this extended line-up performed as part of Barker and John Feldmann's Back To The Beach ska festival in Huntington State Beach, where Barker again joined the band for three songs.

=== 2018–2025: The Aquabats! RadVentures!, Kooky Spooky...In Stereo, and Finally! ===
On July 31, 2018, after several weeks of teasing a major band announcement, The Aquabats launched a high-profile Kickstarter campaign with the goal of raising a minimum of $1.1 million to help finance an entire return season of The Aquabats! Super Show!, as well as the production and release of three albums: a new studio album, a Super Show! soundtrack and a re-recorded greatest hits compilation. The campaign video featured a slew of celebrity cameos voicing support for the band, though most prominently featured actor and musician Jack Black, who was confirmed by Billboard to serve as executive producer for the series' return. Along with the launch of the Kickstarter, The Aquabats began releasing a series of metafictional Super Show! "mini-episodes" exclusively to their YouTube channel, depicting the MC Bat Commander's quest to reunite the estranged Aquabats following their show's cancellation.

By August 28, mere days before the campaign's end date of September 1, the Kickstarter had only raised $601,629 of the band's desired $1.1 million goal. The funding was voluntarily cancelled and the campaign was significantly restructured, resurrected the same day with a new goal of $100,000 for a new album and continuing production of Super Show! "mini-episodes". The $100,000 mark was met within minutes and the project ultimately raised over $600,000, which was stated to be used to independently produce "at least twelve" mini-episodes of Super Show!, two new Aquabats studio albums, one live album, and two Super Show! soundtrack albums.

Throughout 2019, The Aquabats worked resolutely to fulfill their Kickstarter-funded projects. In March, the band simultaneously released The Aquabats! Super Show! Television Soundtrack: Volume One, a soundtrack compilation of songs from Super Show!'s first season, and The Fury of The Aquabats! Live at The Fonda!, a live recording of a 2018 performance of The Fury of The Aquabats!, as exclusive digital downloads for Kickstarter backers. In June, preceded by the release of the single "Cobraman Theme!", The Aquabats! Super Show! Television Soundtrack: Volume One was given a wide physical release on The Aquabats' self-operated label Gloopy Records, premiering at 165 on the Billboard 200 and number one on Top Heatseekers, the band's highest placement on each chart to date. Starting September 28, 2019, The Aquabats! Super Show! was officially relaunched as a biweekly YouTube-exclusive web series entitled The Aquabats! RadVentures!.

"Skeleton Inside!", the first single from The Aquabats' sixth studio album, premiered on the band's YouTube channel on October 25, 2019, though did not make mention of an album title or a tentative release date beyond "later this year". The album's official title, Kooky Spooky...In Stereo, was revealed in February 2020, followed by the album's second single, the couch potato-themed "Pajamazon!", on April 10. Inspired by the ongoing COVID-19 pandemic in the United States, which necessitated mass self-quarantining and social distancing, "Pajamazon!" was promoted by a music video primarily made up of self-submitted videos of fans and friends of The Aquabats dancing to the song in their homes, marking The Aquabats' first music video since "Fashion Zombies!" in 2005. While Kooky Spooky...In Stereo was originally scheduled for a June 20 release date, manufacturing delays resulting from the coronavirus pandemic as well as political tensions from the ongoing George Floyd protests which began in late May 2020 prompted the band to postpone the album's release; in an uncharacteristically serious public statement, The Aquabats acknowledged that "There will always be time for goofy, rowdy rock...but it doesn't feel right to us to be loud and self-promoting at this moment in time", encouraging open discussion about race and racism and linking to resources from the National Museum of African American History and Culture and confirming a new digital release date of August 21, 2020.

On February 29, 2024, the band announced their seventh album, Finally!, as well as the return of Chainsaw, The Prince of Karate and Catboy and officially introduced Gorney. Gorney has performed as a fill-in bassist, as Smash McLarson, prior to his official introduction. The album released on June 21.

== Musical style ==
Over the course of their career, The Aquabats have experienced several radical evolutions in their sound and musical style.

"Super Rad!" (1997)
"Super Rad!", the leading single from The Fury..., exemplifies the rhythmic ska influence typical of the band's early material.

"Giant Robot Birdhead" (1999)
With guitar riffs and synthesizers taking precedence over brass melodies, Floating Eye marked The Aquabats' transition from ska into more textured punk and new wave sounds.

"Fashion Zombies!" (2005)
Charge!!, The Aquabats' first album as a quintet, established the band's current musical style of guitar-driven rock and punk.

Having originally formed as a part of Orange County's burgeoning third wave ska scene, much of the band's early material was rooted in the genre. Boasting an eight-piece line-up featuring two lead guitarists, a keyboardist and a horn section consisting of two trumpets and a saxophone, The Aquabats' style of ska was primarily driven by brass and guitar, incorporating elements of surf rock and punk rock. Their second album, 1997's The Fury of The Aquabats!, while still predominantly ska-based, found the band starting to expand their sound into newer territory, featuring more pronounced punk and surf influences and tongue-in-cheek experimentalism, including several instrumentals, pastiches of ragtime and tango music and the utilization of such unconventional instruments as clarinets, electric sitars and even manualism.

In 1999, The Aquabats underwent a significant shift in style for their third studio album, The Aquabats vs. the Floating Eye of Death!, and its companion piece Myths, Legends, and Other Amazing Adventures, Vol. 2, further exploring the multi-genre eclecticism which had been hinted at with The Fury. A conscious decision by the band to write more diverse material, these albums saw a near-complete forfeit of the brass-driven ska of their previous albums in favor of more guitar and synthesizer-structured songwriting, embracing a punk rock and new wave sound greatly influenced by Devo and Oingo Boingo, two of The Aquabats' biggest inspirations. The band also began widening their genre experimentation to encompass such disparate styles as electronica, synthpop and even hip-hop, elements which persist in their sound to present day.

During The Aquabats' career lull in the early 2000s, several of the band's key members departed from the line-up, eventually reducing the former octet down to a mere quintet of vocals, guitar, keyboards, bass, and drums. This inevitably had a profound impact on The Aquabats' sound, in particular the complete loss of their once characteristic horn section. 2005's Charge!!, the first release featuring this reduced line-up, marked an abrupt shift from the eclecticism of their previous records, firmly establishing The Aquabats' current rock-based musical style, mixing elements of punk, new wave and ska, a style which has also been described as some publications as "nerd rock" owing to the band's lyrical emphasis on pop culture.

In recent years, The Aquabats have introduced an increased presence of keyboards and synthesizers into this style, with critics noting their 2011 album Hi-Five Soup! as featuring more noticeable elements of synthpop and electronica.

=== Departure from ska genre ===
Although the band continues to incorporate occasional elements of ska into their music, The Aquabats have since distanced themselves from their association with the ska genre after having moved away from an overtly ska-based sound in the early 2000s, having since labeled themselves as simply a "rock band" in their official press biographies. In a 2012 interview, singer Christian Jacobs stated "I don't think we ever considered ourselves a ska band. We were just The Aquabats. And some of the songs we happened to play were ska", noting elsewhere, "It was never a deliberate thing [to stop playing ska], but I think it just naturally happened because there's a lot of different styles of music that we play. I've always been into bands like Ween and things like that, that can chameleon-like drift from genre to genre and play whatever music they want...there's no boundaries. If you set yourself up as a punk band, then you pretty much just have to play punk. Or if you're a ska band, you just play ska". Chad Larson, speaking on the same matter, explained "Having the same guitar rhythm for every song gets kind of boring...even on the earlier albums that had ska rhythms we were focusing more on the 'adventure' songs than really 'ska' songs. So as we grew as musicians, we wanted to experiment with different rhythms", adding "we were never really a good ska band anyway".

== Live performances ==
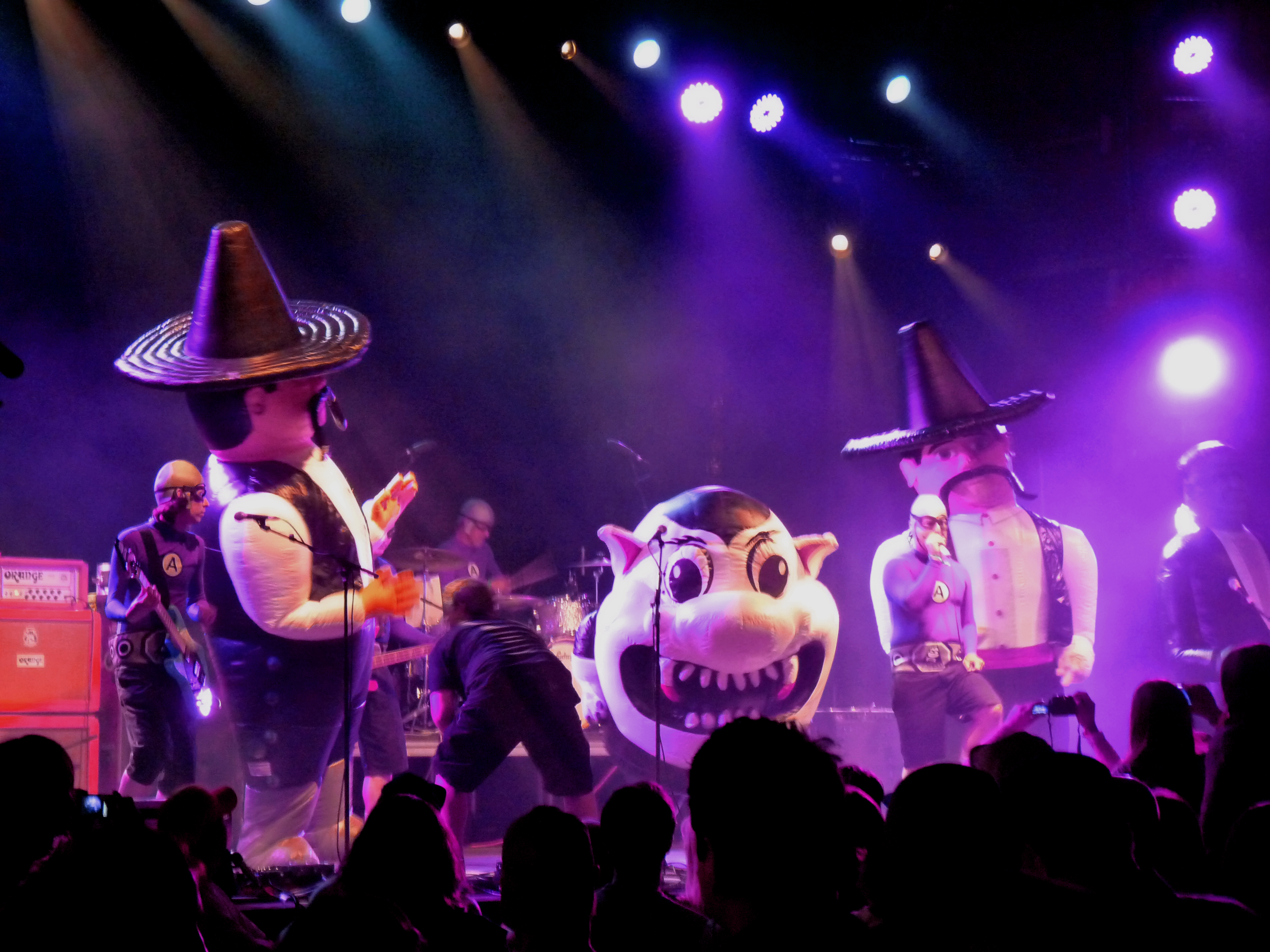
The Aquabats performing at the 2011 Coachella Festival, featuring an elaborate set-up of large inflatable characters

Since the earliest days of the band, The Aquabats have earned a reputation for their theatrical live performances featuring a variety of comedic stunts and antics based around their superhero-themed persona.

During the 1990s, when their concerts were at their most elaborately staged, a typical Aquabats performance would often include choreographed fight scenes with costumed villains, the use of numerous props, acrobatic stunts and varying degrees of pyrotechnics, ranging from small fireworks to The MC Bat Commander fire breathing. While many of these elements were eventually phased out of the live shows in the early 2000s, the one consistent staple of every Aquabats concert has remained the band's onstage "battles" with villains and monsters. These villains, typically played by The Aquabats' road crew, will crash the stage at one or two moments in the show and exchange humorous banter with the band before engaging each other in mock combat. These fights have ranged from short, improvised fistfights to fully choreographed stage combat utilizing breakable props, maneuvers such as flying kicks and back flips, and sometimes spreading out into the audience, with The Aquabats ultimately winning most—but not all—encounters. For some performances, in place of a villain, The Aquabats will feature a sketch with one of their "allies": for example, to segue into their song "Magic Chicken", the titular character— a man in a chicken suit— will come onstage to hand out fried chicken to audience members.

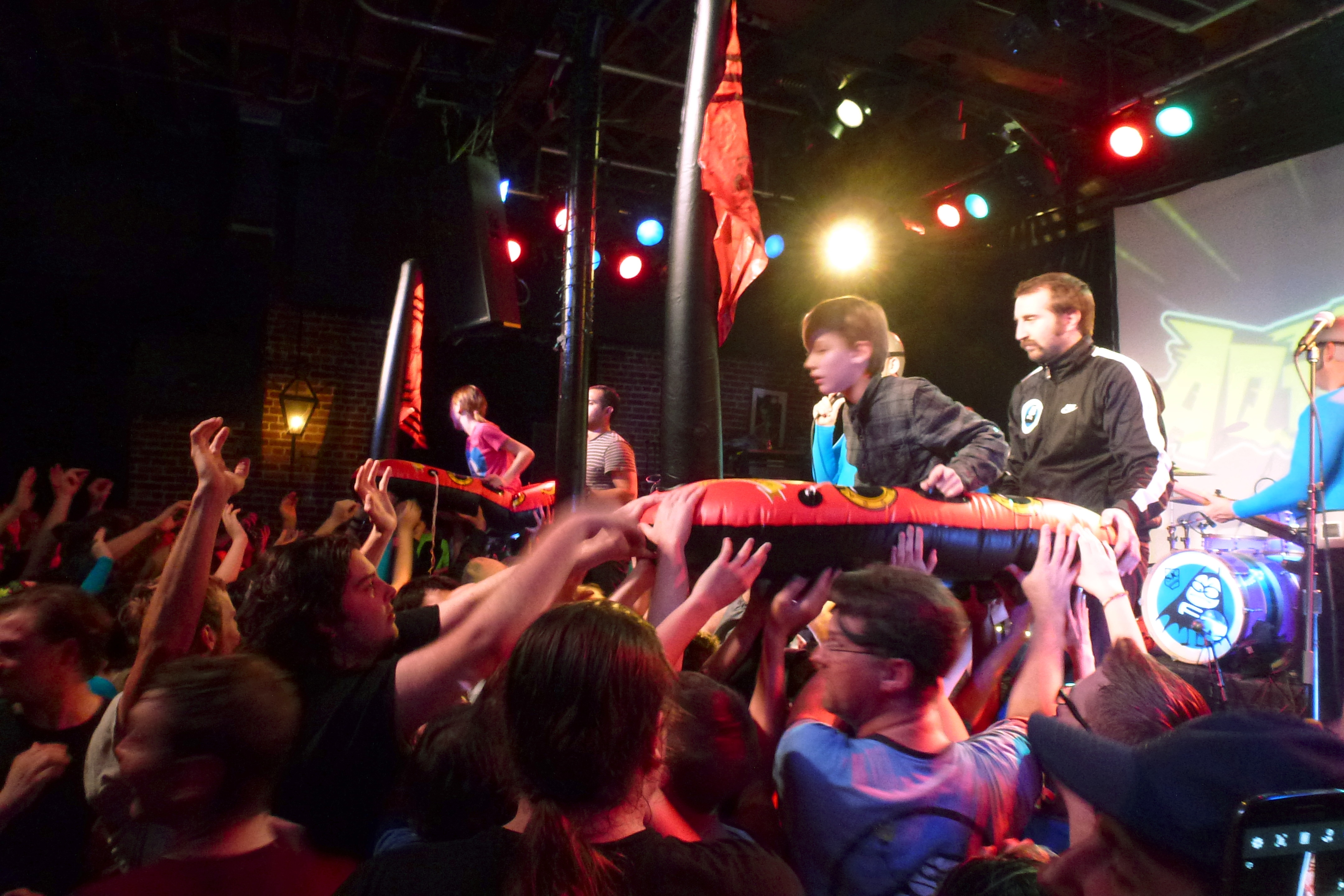
"Pool Floatie Races" is one of many ways The Aquabats incorporate audience participation into their shows.

Audience participation is a common element of The Aquabats' stage shows. Both the band and their onstage characters regularly interact with the crowd, including initiating mass games of beach ball volleyball or spraying them with substances like Silly String and fire extinguishers. Additionally, a few of The Aquabats' enemies are known only to be "defeated" by fans by being pelted with projectiles supplied by the band, usually large quantities of plastic balls. Acknowledging the younger members of their fanbase, The Aquabats often incorporate any children in the venue as part of their shows, inviting them to dance onstage with the band at the end of their sets. With parents' permission, children can also take part in onstage games and activities with the aid of the audience. The most common of these have included "pool floatie races", where two selected children mount inflatable rafts or pool toys and race across the venue via crowd surfing, and assisted stage diving, in which between songs the MC Bat Commander will gently throw children into a waiting audience so they may experience their "first punk rock moment".

On the visual end of these performances, keeping in line with their cartoon and pop culture-inspired aesthetic, The Aquabats' stage shows are accompanied by a large video screen backdrop which plays montage clips of various cartoons, movies, TV shows, and stock footage specifically edited to match each song. This screen also plays prerecorded comedy videos starring the band which introduce and close each show, as well as fake commercials for fictional Aquabats-brand products which serve as impromptu "commercial breaks" between songs. These visuals, along with the band's props and costumes, are regularly changed to accommodate special seasonal performances, in particular The Aquabats' annual holiday shows.

== Superhero mythology ==
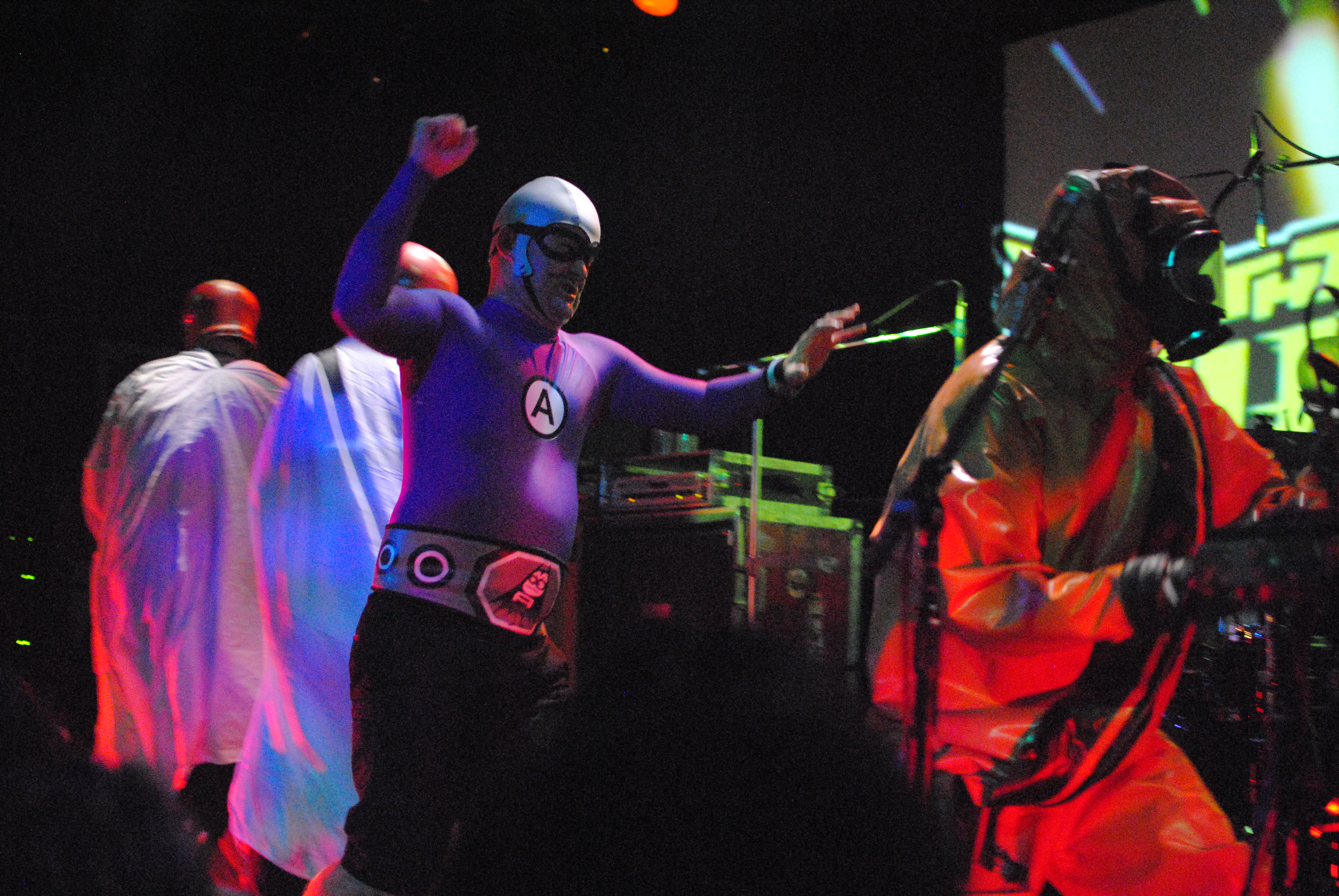
The Aquabats fighting villains in San Francisco in 2012. Many of these onstage villains have been established in The Aquabats' fictional superhero mythology, with developed backstories of their own.

The Aquabats are known for their superhero identity, which adheres to a comprehensive mythology reflected in the band's music, stage shows and promotional material in which the members are in fact a team of musical crimefighters on a quest to save the world.

Detailed in their lyrics, liner notes, website and television series, The Aquabats have developed a small but elaborate fictional universe surrounding this mythology, describing the band's fictitious history and outlandish adventures as well as conceiving an extensive roster of enemies and allies, many of whom are the subjects of specific songs and have appeared as part of The Aquabats' stage shows in mock fight scenes or comedic skits. Over the years, this mythology, and in particular the fictional backstory regarding their origins, has continually changed, evolved and occasionally been retconned to explain changes in the band's line-up.

The Aquabats' origin story can be separated into two distinct eras. For the first half of their career, the band maintained a consistently canonical backstory established over the course of their first two albums, alleging the band members were actually humanoid bat creatures hailing from a distant tropical island called Aquabania. According to legend, Aquabania had been invaded by the villainous Space Monster "M", forcing the surviving inhabitants to flee into the ocean where they eventually washed ashore in California and were taken in by Professor Monty Corndog, a mad scientist who used "chemicals" to give them superpowers. Donning costumes including such accessories as "radioactive rashguards", "power belts", and "anti-negativity helmets", The Aquabats chose to channel their powers through music in order to "take over the world" by attracting legions of fans to aid them in combating Space Monster "M" and reclaiming their homeland, fighting the numerous villains and monsters who'd attempt to thwart their musical quest along the way.

With the heavy line-up changes in the early-to-mid 2000s which left only two of the original members remaining, The Aquabats eventually dropped the Aquabania elements out of their backstory, reestablishing themselves as a group of freelance superheroes of indeterminate origin who travel the countryside, fighting evil and "destroying boredom". This loose framework would later serve as the basis for the band's television series, The Aquabats! Super Show!, where each member's character was further developed to showcase their own individual powers and personalities, transitioning the Aquabats' mythology from a story arc to a character ensemble. While the series' first season left the band's origins intentionally vague, several episodes of the second season feature each member of The Aquabats recounting the band's history in animated flashback sequences; while one of these sequences recalls the original Aquabania mythos, each member's flashbacks directly contradict one another, leaving it unknown which could be considered officially canonical.

== Aquacadets and The Aquabats Cadet Faction ==
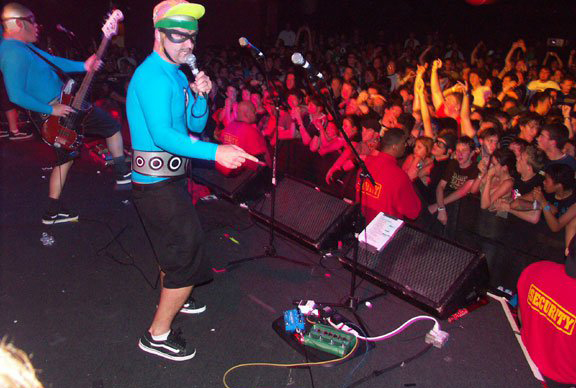
The Aquabats' dedicated fanbase and members of their official fan club are referred to as "Aquacadets".

Fans of The Aquabats are referred to by the band as Aquacadets or the more casual "Cadets", a title which has held alternately official and unofficial status among their fanbase for most of the band's career.

Throughout the late 1990s and into the mid-2000s, The Aquabats operated an official fan club known as The Aquabats Cadet Faction, selling membership packages which typically offered a variety of exclusive merchandise, access to exclusive web content, a subscription to an official newsletter written by members of the band and entrance into occasional semi-private "secret shows" held at smaller venues. Most significantly, enrollment into The Aquabats Cadet Faction granted card-carrying members admission into official fan conventions known as Cadet Summits, where fans could meet and interact with The Aquabats through Q&A panels, games and award shows where fans received trophies in categories including "Cadet of the Year". The Aquabats held five such Cadet Summits throughout Southern California from 1997 to 2006:

- October 25, 1997, Fountain Valley: The Aquabats hosted a day for fans at Bullwinkle's Family Fun'N'Food family entertainment center, which featured the premiere screening of the "Super Rad!" music video.
- December 5, 1998, Pomona: the band performed an exclusive show at The Glass House concert venue alongside screenings of various videos including the only public showing of The Aquabats! 1998 television pilot.
- April 6, 2000, Santa Ana: advertised as "The Third Sorta-Annual 1999/2000 Aquacadet Summit", The Aquabats performed an extended awards show-themed concert at The Galaxy Theatre, featuring additional performances by side projects The Moon Monkeys, Digital Unicorn and Le Pigbat.
- January 18, 2002, Huntington Beach: The Aquabats hosted a picnic gathering on the beach, highlighted by an acoustic singalong set made up entirely of fan requests. This performance was recorded and later released as an officially sanctioned bootleg cassette in 2014.
- June 6, 2006, in San Diego: hosted at the Concourse Meeting Hall during San Diego Comic-Con weekend, the band celebrated the 10th anniversary of The Return of The Aquabats by performing the album in its entirety with former member Prince Adam.

Following the 2006 Cadet Summit, The Aquabats Cadet Faction lapsed into an extended period of complete inactivity, upon which fans independently carried on unofficial fan club operations through social media, most notably the formation of numerous splinter factions based around certain themes, shared interests or geographic location: while most of these groups were small sub-sections within online fan communities such as Tumblr, some factions like "Piratebats" and "Ninjabats" cultivated a small real-world presence by attending The Aquabats' concerts in accordingly themed costume attire. In 2018, The Aquabats temporarily resurrected The Aquabats Cadet Faction as part of the Bring Back The Aquabats! Kickstarter campaign, again issuing personalized ID cards and exclusive merchandise and web content. On Dec. 7, 2024, a Cadet Summit was held in conjunction with the 30th anniversary shows at the Glass House in Pomona, Calif.

In 2019, independent record label Related Records, who had previously released the officially sanctioned 2014 bootleg of The Aquabats' acoustic performance at the 2002 Cadet Summit, compiled and released No Singles: A 20 Year Anniversary Tribute to The Aquabats vs. The Floating Eye of Death, a fourteen-track tribute album covering the entirety of the band's 1999 Floating Eye of Death album by various underground punk, electronica and experimental musicians.

== Side bands and related projects ==
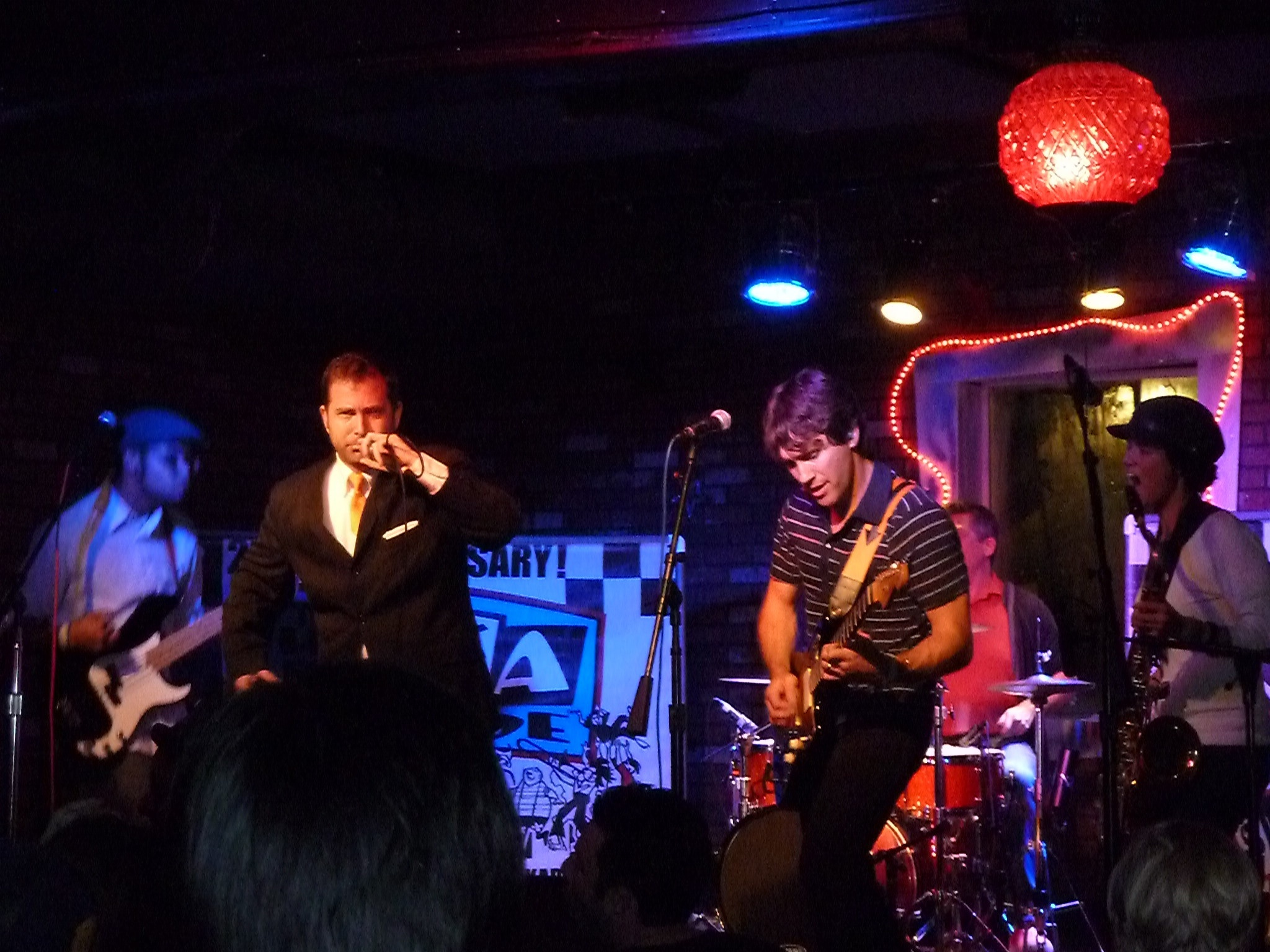
Sharing "the same DNA, songs, band members and resources", GOGO13 are credited for influencing the formation of The Aquabats, particularly in their use of humor and stage theatrics.

The roots of The Aquabats are usually traced back to GOGO13, a ska band founded by Christian Jacobs' brothers Parker and Tyler while they were living in St. George, Utah, in 1993. Following their abrupt disbandment in 1994, several of GOGO13's members moved on to play in The Aquabats' earliest line-ups, during which time the band's performances consisted of several GOGO13 songs, most notably "Idiot Box!", which was later recorded for The Aquabats' first two albums. Parker Jacobs permanently reformed GOGO13 in 2001 and continues to tour with a rotating line-up of musicians which, among others, have included original Aquabats trumpeter Boyd Terry and guitarist Ben "The Brain" Bergeson.

From 1993 to 1995, Adam Deibert, Charles Gray, Corey Pollock and Pat "Patbat" McDonald were all members of the Huntington Beach ska band The Goodwin Club, recording only one full-length album before disbanding in April 1995, playing their final show opening for The Aquabats. The Goodwin Club reunited in 2015 with Deibert, Pollock and McDonald returning from the original line-up and continue to sporadically perform throughout Southern California, including as support for The Aquabats and GOGO13. Prior to forming The Aquabats, Christian Jacobs sang in a shoegazing duo called The Moon Men with future Aquabats and Yo Gabba Gabba! collaborator Scott Schultz, while Chad Larson was the bass guitarist for the hardcore punk band B.H.R. until their break-up in 1997.

In 1997, Parker Jacobs formed The Sandfleas as a side project to perform as openers at The Aquabats' shows, based on the gang of masked villains who had become a staple of The Aquabats' mythology and onstage rogues' gallery. Consisting anonymously of Parker Jacobs on vocals and a rotating line-up of musicians including Christian and Tyler Jacobs, Larson and Pollock, The Sandfleas played deliberately sloppy punk rock songs which were humorously antagonistic and insulting towards their audience, intending to be the musical "bad guy" equivalent to The Aquabats' "good guys". The Sandfleas released an EP entitled Four Songs Four Jerks on The Aquabats' Horchata Records label in 1999 before breaking up shortly afterwards.

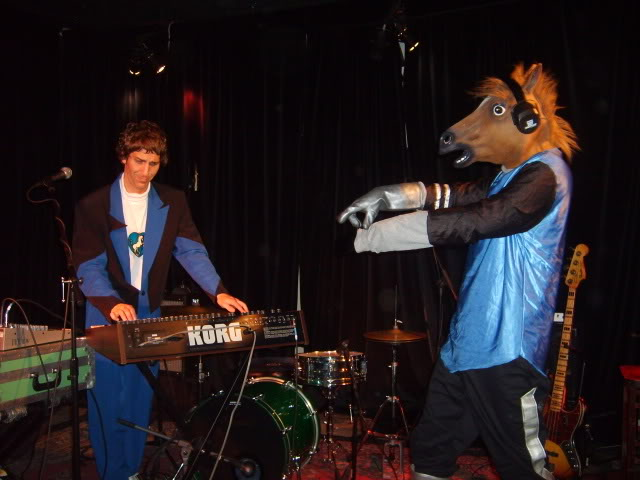
Adam Deibert formed Digital Unicorn as an opening band for an Aquabats tour in 1999, which ultimately evolved into a full-fledged solo project.

During their time in The Aquabats, Deibert and Gray both joined the Long Beach indie pop band Bikeride in 1999 as bassist and guitarist, respectively, recording on three of the band's studio albums, all of which featured James Briggs' guest contributions on saxophone and clarinet. Gray left Bikeride in 2002, though Deibert remained a member until lead singer-songwriter Tony Carbone's death from cancer in 2008. Shortly before Carbone's death, The Aquabats hosted a benefit show for Carbone in Pomona, California, where Deibert joined the band onstage during their encores. From 1999 to 2010, Deibert was also active in the two-man electronic project Digital Unicorn, which he had originally created as a last-minute replacement for an opening band who had dropped off a tour with The Aquabats. Digital Unicorn eventually progressed into a solo endeavor, culminating in the studio album Theirs Travel Began and Loaded the Dream, which was released on Horchata Records in 2001.

After leaving The Aquabats in 1996, Ben Bergeson founded the instrumental surf rock band The Moon Monkeys, playing numerous shows with The Aquabats and GOGO13 before releasing their sole studio EP So Far, Far Out! in 1999 on Horchata Records. Corey Pollock, following his own departure from The Aquabats in 2006, joined the Costa Mesa pop punk trio and longtime Aquabats tourmates Supernova in August 2008, playing with them under his Aquabat stage name of "Chainsaw" until their hiatus in January 2010. After his departure from the Aquabats and move to Canada from 1995-1997 , original guitarist Matt Van Gundy has stayed active, playing guitar in several local bands. In 2024 he formed CH3MTRAILs, a heavy atmospheric prog rock/metal band from northern Virginia.

As professional musicians, current guitarist Ian Fowles and drummer Ricky Falomir have performed and recorded with many bands and musicians of note, though are best known as original members of the punk rock bands Death by Stereo and Assorted Jelly Beans, respectively. In relation to The Aquabats, Fowles was a guest bassist for Hunter Burgan's Hunter Revenge and – in costume as EagleBones – Kepi Ghoulie's band during both groups' tours with The Aquabats, and in 2014, became an official member of My Chemical Romance singer Gerard Way's solo band after the two had become acquainted working together on The Aquabats! Super Show!, recording and co-writing on Way's 2014 debut Hesitant Alien. In June 2015, both Fowles and Falomir made up ex-Ramones bassist C. J. Ramone's backing band for an East Coast tour with Japanese band Shonen Knife. Ricky also toured playing drums for LA reggae band The Aggrolites in 2009.

The band's original instrumental version of "Sequence Erase!", recorded with Parry Gripp, was used as the title theme for the band's original television pilot, The Aquabats! In Color!. From 2004 to 2010, this recording was used as the theme song to the main series of Mega64, a video game-themed comedy series produced by a comedy troupe of the same name. As longtime friends and associates of The Aquabats, the main cast and crew of Mega64 would later go on to produce interstitial sketches for The Aquabats! Super Show! television series.

== Members ==
The Aquabats lineups
1994 Revenge of the Midget Punchers	Christian Jacobs – vocals; Ben Bergeson – guitar; Matt Van Gundy – guitar; Chad Larson – bass; Boyd Terry – trumpet; Adam Deibert – trumpet; Jeffery McFerson – trombone; Chad Parkin – keyboards; Rod Arellano – drums
1995–1997 Bat Boy The Return of The Aquabats	The Caped Commander – vocals; The Brain – guitar; Chain Saw – guitar; Crash McLarson – bass; Catboy – trumpet; Prince Adam – trumpet; Nacho – keyboards; Roddy B. – drums
1997–1998 The Fury of the Aquabats!	The Bat Commander – vocals; Ultra Kyu – guitar; Chainsaw the Prince of Karate – guitar; Crash McLarson – bass; Catboy – trumpet; Prince Adam – trumpet, synthesizer; Jaime the Robot – saxophone, keyboards; The Baron von Tito – drums
1998–2000 The Aquabats vs. the Floating Eye of Death! Myths, Legends, and Other Amazing Adventures, Vol. 2	The M.C. Bat Commander – vocals; The Mysterious Kyu – guitar; Chainsaw Karate – guitar; Crash McLarson – bass; Catboy – trumpet; Prince Adam – trumpet, keyboards; The Robot – saxophone, keyboards; Doctor Rock – drums
2000–2002 live shows only	The MC Bat Commander – vocals; Chainsaw the Prince of Karate – guitar; Crash McLarson – bass; Catboy – trumpet; Prince Adam – trumpet, guitar; The Robot – saxophone, keyboards; Doctor Rock – drums
2002–2004 Serious Awesomeness! Yo! Check Out This Ride! EP	MC Bat Commander – vocals; Chainsaw, Prince of Karate – guitar; Crash McLarson – bass; Prince Adam – trumpet, guitar, keyboards; The Robot – saxophone, keyboards; Ricky Fitness – drums
2004–2006 Charge!!	MC Bat Commander – vocals; Chainsaw – guitar; Crash McLarson – bass; Jimmy the Robot – keyboards; Ricky Fitness – drums
2006–2024 Hi-Five Soup! Kooky Spooky...In Stereo	MC Bat Commander – vocals; Eaglebones Falconhawk – guitar; Crash McLarson – bass; Jimmy the Robot – keyboards, saxophone; Ricky Fitness – drums
2024-present Finally!	MC Bat Commander –vocals; Crash McLarson – bass; Jimmy the Robot – saxophone, keyboards; Ricky Fitness – drums; Eaglebones Falconhawk – guitar; Cat Boy – trumpet; Chainsaw! The Prince of Karate – guitar; Gorney – keyboards

=== Core members ===
- The M.C. Bat Commander (Christian Jacobs) – vocals (1994–present)
- Crash McLarson (Chad Larson) – bass, backing vocals (1994–present)
- Jimmy the Robot (James Briggs) – keyboards, saxophone and woodwinds, backing vocals (1997–present)
- Ricky Fitness (Ricky Falomir) – drums, percussion, backing vocals (2002–present)
- Eaglebones Falconhawk (Ian Fowles) – guitar, backing vocals (2006–present)

=== Extended lineup ===
- Catboy (Boyd Terry) – trumpet, various brass instruments, backing vocals (1994–2002, 2024–present)
- Chainsaw the Prince of Karate (Courtney Pollock) – guitar (1995–2006, 2024–present)
- Gorney (Matt Gorney) – piano, keyboards, bass (as Smash McLarson prior to 2024) (2019–present)
- Johnny Christmas (John Christianson) – trumpet (2022-present)
- Keymaster Minh (Minh Quan) – keyboards and piano (2023-present)
- El Hefe (Aaron Abeyta) – trumpet (2025–present)

=== Former members ===
- Gumby (Matt Van Gundy) – guitar (1994–1995)
- Nacho (Chad Parkin) – keyboards (1994–1997)
- Rod the Hammer (Rod Arellano) – drums (1994–1996)
- Ben the Brain (Ben Bergeson) – guitar (1994–1996)
- Chief Captain PatBat (Patrick McDonald) – trumpet (1994)
- Moose Nuckle (John Pentle) – (1995–1996)
- Creedle (Wendall Creed) – guitar (1995)
- Erick Hauser – bass (1994)
- Big Harold – saxophone (1995)
- Captain Croxall (Brian Croxall) – trombone (1996)
- Le Pigbat (Tyler Jacobs) – (1997)
- The Baron von Tito (Travis Barker) – drums, percussion (1996–1998)
- Ultra Kyu/The Mysterious Kyu (Charles Gray) – guitar, various string instruments, synthesizer, backing vocals (1997–1999)
- Doctor Rock (Gabe Palmer) – drums, programming (1998–2002)
- Prince Adam (Adam Deibert) – trumpet, synthesizer, guitar, backing vocals, hand accompaniment (1994–2004)
- Popeye (Michael Vogelsang) – guitar (2005)

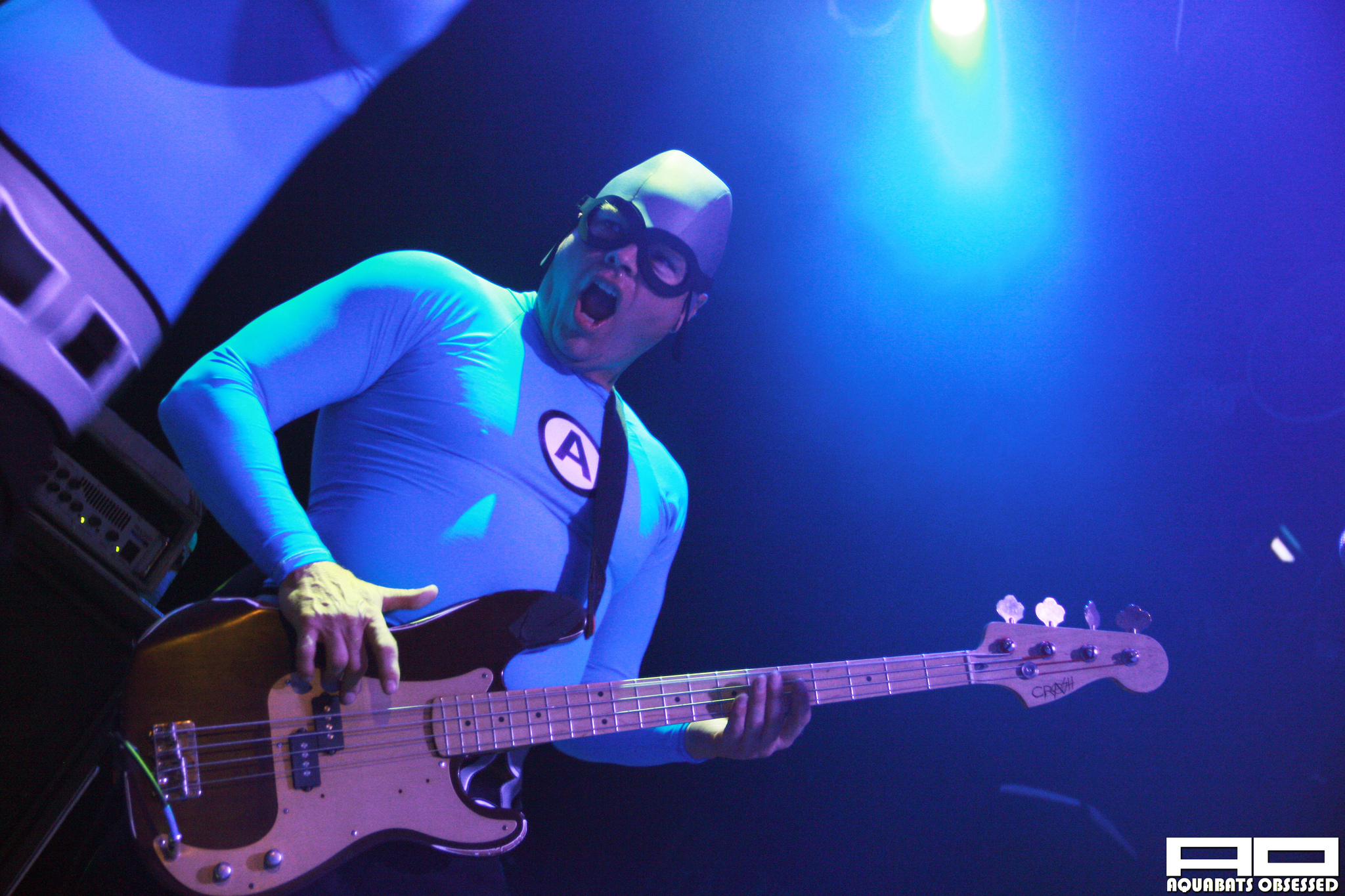
Bassist Crash McLarson co-founded The Aquabats in 1994

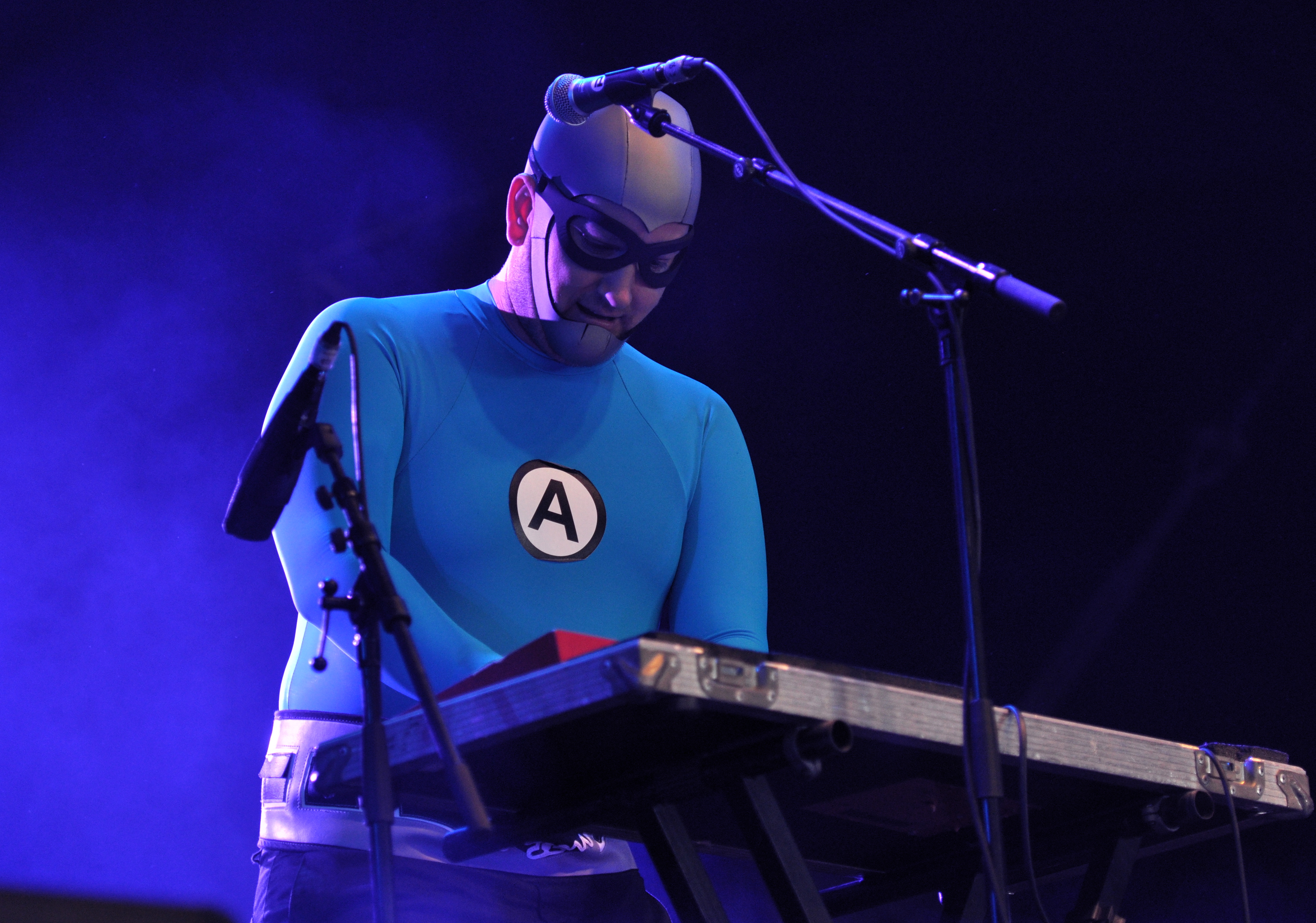
Jimmy the Robot joined the band in 1996 primarily as a saxophonist and eventually as dual sax and keyboardist

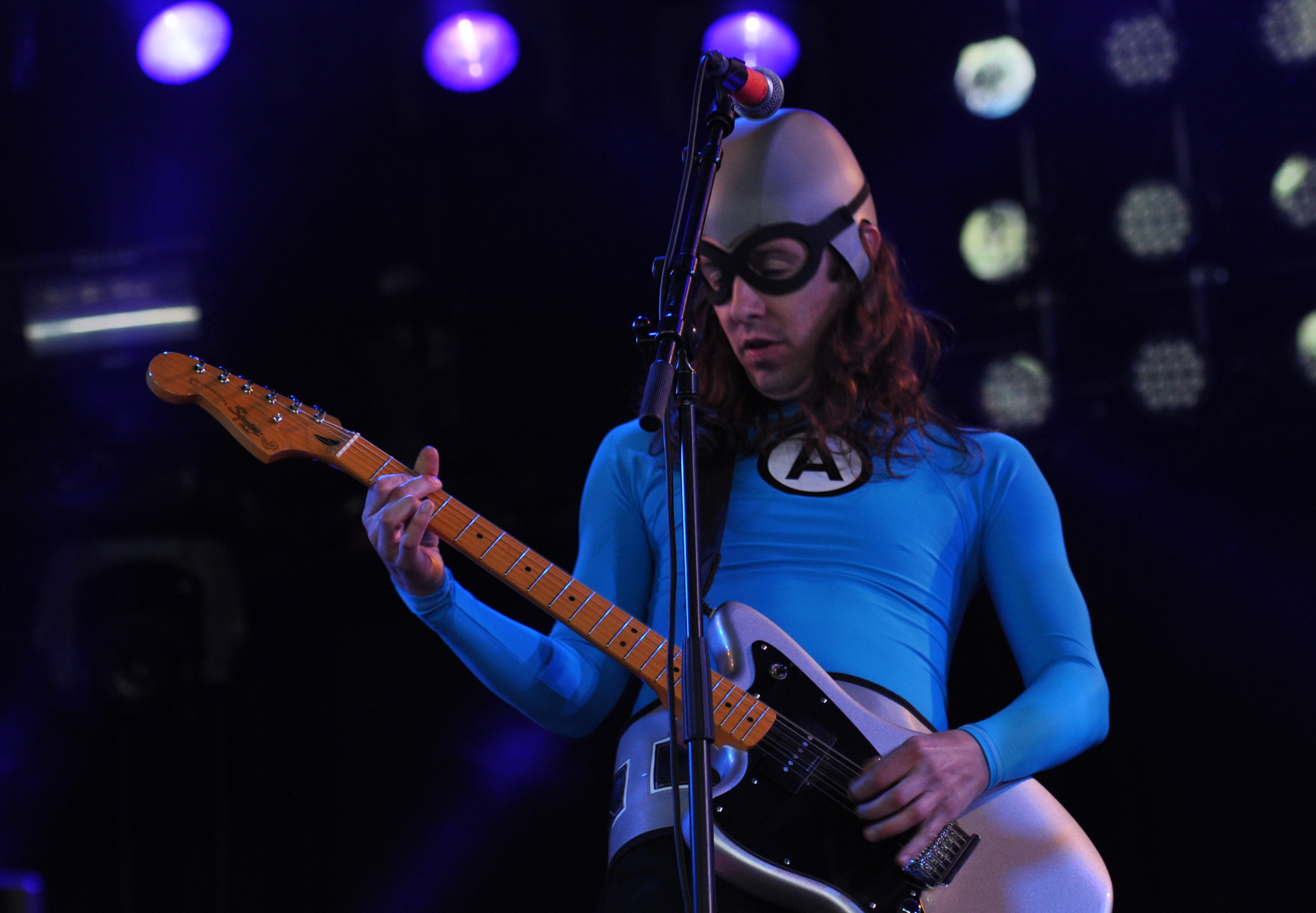
Eaglebones Falconhawk replaced longtime guitarist Chainsaw in mid-2006

== Discography ==
Studio albums

- The Return of The Aquabats (1995)
- The Fury of The Aquabats! (1997)
- The Aquabats vs. the Floating Eye of Death! (1999)
- Charge!! (2005)
- Hi-Five Soup! (2011)
- Kooky Spooky...In Stereo (2020)
- Finally! (2024)

EPs

- Yo! Check Out This Ride! EP (2004)
- Radio Down! (2010)
- I Want A Hippopotamus For Christmas! (2021)

Compilation albums

- Myths, Legends and Other Amazing Adventures, Vol. 2 (2000)

Soundtrack albums

- The Aquabats! Super Show! Television Soundtrack: Volume One (2019)
