= The Aquabats vs. the Floating Eye of Death! =

The Aquabats vs. The Floating Eye of Death!

Studio album by The Aquabats
- Released: October 26, 1999
- Recorded: Summer 1999
- Genre: Rock; new wave; punk rock
- Length: 46:19
- Label: Goldenvoice, Time Bomb
- Producer: Thom Wilson, Cameron Webb

The Aquabats chronology
The Fury of The Aquabats! (1997)	The Aquabats vs. The Floating Eye of Death! (1999)	Myths, Legends and Other Amazing Adventures, Vol. 2 (2000)

The Aquabats vs. the Floating Eye of Death! is the third studio album from American band The Aquabats, released on October 26, 1999, on Goldenvoice Records.

After the success of The Fury of The Aquabats!, Floating Eye found the band moving away from the ska-influenced sound of their previous albums and into more diverse and experimental musical textures. A commercial disappointment upon release, The Aquabats were dropped from Goldenvoice the following year, leading to a lengthy semi-hiatus from touring and recording until the band's 2005 comeback album Charge!! would renew their popularity.

== Overview ==
Following the modest commercial success and high-profile tours behind their 1997 album The Fury of The Aquabats!, The Aquabats had begun to feel pigeonholed by their media portrayal as a "cheesy ska band", unanimously agreeing to explore newer and more varied musical styles rather than just produce another ska album. As such, Floating Eye marked a drastic stylistic shift in The Aquabats' sound, almost entirely abandoning the brass-driven ska which had characterized their previous albums in favor of an eclectic mix of guitar- and keyboard-driven rock music strongly influenced by punk rock and new wave, a style the band would continue to develop on their subsequent albums.

Having written upwards of forty different songs and partial songs for the album, The Aquabats produced approximately thirty tracks during the recording sessions for Floating Eye, only fourteen of which were ultimately included on the album. In November 2000, the band released a companion compilation album, Myths, Legends and Other Amazing Adventures, Vol. 2, featuring the remaining songs not selected for inclusion, while also releasing a large number of unreleased songs and rough demos for free on their website.

The material recorded for Floating Eye and Myths & Legends mark the only Aquabats studio material to feature drummer Dr. Rock, as well as the last to feature guitarist The Mysterious Kyu. Up until 2024, this was also the last album to feature trumpeter Catboy as an official member, as he would depart from the band in 2002, as well as the final Aquabats album to feature a full-time horn section; following a guest appearance on The Aquabats' 2020 album Kooky Spooky...In Stereo, Catboy would rejoin the band in 2024 for their seventh album Finally!.

== Release and reception ==
With the near-complete lack of The Aquabats' formerly marketable ska sound, Goldenvoice Records expressed mixed feelings over Floating Eye, reportedly telling the band that the album had no satisfactory single and would be difficult to promote. In a 2005 interview, bassist Chad Larson retrospectively agreed with this assessment on the album's lack of a commercial sound, noting that while he felt the material was strong, it "probably wasn't the record we should have put out at that time". True to the label's predictions, Floating Eye failed to match the success of The Fury, placing only at number 35 on Billboard's Top Heatseekers chart. Goldenvoice nevertheless granted the band a budget to shoot a music video, which The Aquabats instead used to film an unsuccessful television pilot entitled The Aquabats! In Color!.

Despite its relatively poor commercial success, critical reception to Floating Eye was mostly positive. Steve Huey of Allmusic gave The Aquabats vs. the Floating Eye of Death! a rating of four stars out of five, writing "Sure, the humor is frothy and avoids substance like the plague, but anybody expecting anything else from a typical third-wave ska album is waging a pointless battle. Better to just hang on and enjoy the ride, because the Aquabats conduct that ride with a panache few other third-wavers can match, and their songwriting skills continue to improve with each record."

Coupled with Goldenvoice's ongoing financial troubles at the time as a result of the first Coachella Valley Music and Arts Festival, the disappointing sales of Floating Eye eventually contributed to The Aquabats' dismissal from the label in 2000, beginning an extended period of relative inactivity which would last the band throughout the early 2000s until they would independently return to recording in 2004, with the EP Yo! Check Out This Ride!, which helped them sign to Nitro Records later in the year.

== Track listing ==
All songs written by The Aquabats, except where noted otherwise.

No.	Title	Length
1.	"Sequence Erase"	3:10
2.	"Giant Robot-Birdhead"	3:34
3.	"Anti-Matter" (The Aquabats, Scott Schultz)	2:47
4.	"Lotto Fever"	3:29
5.	"Lovers of Loving Love"	2:42
6.	"Chemical Bomb"	3:08
7.	"The Man with Glooey Hands"	2:23
8.	"Monster's Wedding"	4:16
9.	"The Ballad of Mr. Bonkers"	3:42
10.	"Canis Lupus"	3:01
11.	"Tiny Pants"	3:10
12.	"The Thing on the Bass Amp"	4:14
13.	"Amino Man" (Jacobs, Dexter Holland)	2:51
14.	"Hello, Good Night"	3:36

=== Previous availability ===
- Demo versions of tracks 9 and 11 first appeared on a series of 7-inch picture discs released in 1998.

== Charts ==
Chart (1999)	Peak position
US Heatseekers Albums (Billboard)	35

== Personnel ==
=== The Aquabats ===
- The MC Bat Commander - vocals
- Crash McLarson - bass, vocals
- Catboy - trumpet, vocals
- The Robot - woodwinds, keyboards, vocals
- The Mysterious Kyu - guitar
- Prince Adam - synthesizers, trumpet
- Chainsaw Karate - guitar
- Doctor Rock (Gabe Palmer) - drums, programming

=== Production ===
- Produced, engineered and mixed by Thom Wilson
- Tracks 3, 5 and 13 produced, engineered and mixed by Cameron Webb
- Recorded in NRG Studios, Ocean Studios, and Citrus College, all in California.
- Mastered by Eddy Schreyer
