= Courtney Pollock =

American musician (born 1975)

- Born: Courtney Adam Pollock; January 31, 1975 (age 51); Orange County, California, U.S.
- Genres: Rock, pop punk, ska
- Occupation: Musician
- Instrument: Guitar
- Years active: 1995–present

Courtney Adam "Corey" Pollock (born January 31, 1975) is an American musician, best known as a member of the Orange County band The Aquabats, in which he plays guitar under the stage name of Chainsaw, the Prince of Karate (alternately Chainsaw Karate).

== Biography ==
Pollock joined The Aquabats in 1995, replacing original guitarist Matt Van Gundy (a.k.a. "Gumby") and subsequently recording on all of the band's studio releases since their 1996 debut. In the early 2000s, while The Aquabats experienced an extended period of inactivity after being dropped from Goldenvoice Records, Pollock began a full-time career managing a custom woodworking business. By 2006, realizing his work schedule could no longer accommodate the band's return to regular touring following the comeback success of 2005's Charge!!, Pollock voluntarily chose to part ways with The Aquabats to focus on his business. He was succeeded by Ian Fowles (a.k.a. "EagleBones Falconhawk").

Despite no longer being an official member of The Aquabats, Pollock continues to sporadically perform with the band as a second guitarist alongside Fowles, typically for shows in southern California or large festivals such as the 2010 Bamboozle and the 2011 Coachella Valley Music and Arts Festival. He has also continued to contribute guitar tracks to The Aquabats' most recent studio albums, credited as an "additional musician" under his stage name of Chainsaw, the Prince of Karate on the 2010 EP Radio Down! and the 2011 LP Hi-Five Soup!. In 2012, he made a cameo appearance in the "Showtime!" episode of The Aquabats! Super Show!, playing a lumberjack-like superhero appropriately named "Chainsaw".

Prior to joining The Aquabats, Pollock was guitarist for the Orange County ska band The Goodwin Club from 1993 to 1995 alongside future Aquabats Charles Gray and Adam Deibert, recording on one album and an EP before disbanding. The Goodwin Club reunited with Pollock and Deibert in 2015 and continue to play occasionally. In 1999, he performed anonymously with other members of The Aquabats in the costumed side project The Sandfleas, playing bass under the stage name "Spodie". In 2008, Pollock joined Orange County pop punk trio and longtime Aquabats tourmates Supernova as a temporary replacement following the departure of long-time guitarist Jodey Lawrence. Shortly after his debut with he band, he was announced as a full-time member, retaining his former title of "Chainsaw". He continued to play with Supernova up until their dissolution in 2010.

Pollock lives in Newport Beach, California with his wife and two children.

== Discography ==
The Aquabats

- The Return of the Aquabats (1996) - guitar (as Chain Saw)
- The Fury of the Aquabats! (1997) - electric and acoustic guitars, vocals, sampling, electric sitar
- The Aquabats vs. the Floating Eye of Death! (1999) - guitar
- Myths, Legends and Other Amazing Adventures, Vol. 2 (2000) - guitar
- Yo! Check Out This Ride! EP (2004) - lead guitar
- Charge!! (2005) - guitar, vocals
- Radio Down! (2010) - additional guitars (not credited as an official member)
- Hi-Five Soup! (2011) - additional guitars (not credited as an official member)
- Finally! (2024) - guitar, vocals

The Goodwin Club

- Join the Club EP (1993) - guitar
- Soda (1994) - guitar
- Soda + Join the Club re-issue (2015) - guitar

The Sandfleas

- Four Songs Four Jerks (1999) - one-stringed bass
