= Boyd Terry =

American musician

- Also known as: Catboy
- Born: Boyd Joseph Terry; October 29, 1969 (age 56); Los Angeles County, California, U.S.
- Occupation: Musician
- Instrument: Trumpet
- Years active: 1994–present

Boyd Joseph Terry (born October 29, 1969) is an American musician, best known as one of the founding members of the Californian band The Aquabats, of which he originally served as trumpeter from 1994 to 2002 under the stage name Catboy before rejoining the band's line-up in 2024.

== Biography ==
Terry helped form the original line-up of The Aquabats in 1994 alongside fellow musicians Christian Jacobs and Chad Larson, all of whom knew each other through mutual friends in the Church of Jesus Christ of Latter-day Saints (LDS Church). According to Larson, it was Terry's presence which was largely responsible for The Aquabats deciding to start out as a ska band with a horn section, as both he and Jacobs had wanted to include Terry as a member despite the trumpet being the only instrument he could play. Terry is also credited for creating the band's iconic costumes, having personally stitched together their original custom rashguards and helmets from spare lycra and neoprene he acquired from Aleeda, a wetsuit-manufacturing company both he and his brother worked for at the time.

During his tenure with The Aquabats, Terry played trumpet and similar valved instruments on all of the band's recordings from their 1994 demo tapes to the 2000 compilation Myths, Legends and Other Amazing Adventures, Vol. 2. He has been credited with writing or co-writing several of the band's songs, most notably "Pool Party!" and the b-side "Mucho Gusto", on which he also sang lead vocals. During The Aquabats' career lull in the early 2000s, Terry amicably parted ways with the band in 2002. His departure was informally announced on The Aquabats' website in a September 7, 2002 news update, facetiously stating that a vague "terrible accident" had left him "incapacitated indefinitely...allegedly".

Since leaving The Aquabats, Terry has pursued a career in apparel design, having worked for both RVCA and Nike. He has occasionally rejoined The Aquabats onstage for select shows in California, most notably in a series of 2009 holiday concerts and several shows in 2018 celebrating the 20th anniversary of The Fury of The Aquabats!. In 2012, Terry made a cameo appearance in the "Showtime!" episode of The Aquabats' television series The Aquabats! Super Show!, playing a superhero appropriately named "Catboy". In 2020, twenty years after his last performance on an Aquabats album, Terry appeared on the band's sixth studio album Kooky Spooky...In Stereo, performing trumpet on the song "Pajamazon!" alongside former member Adam Deibert.

In February 2024, it was announced that Terry had rejoined The Aquabats as an official member for their seventh studio album, Finally!.

== Discography ==
The Aquabats

- The Return of The Aquabats (1995) – trumpet
- The Fury of The Aquabats! (1997) – trumpet, cornet, vocals, sousaphone, Hammond B3
- The Aquabats vs. the Floating Eye of Death! (1999) – trumpet, vocals
- Myths, Legends and Other Amazing Adventures, Vol. 2 (2000) – trumpet, vocals
- Kooky Spooky...In Stereo (2020) - horns on "Pajamazon!" (credited as guest musician)
- Finally! (2024) - trumpet, vocals
