= List of The Aquabats! Super Show! episodes =

The following is a list of episodes for The Aquabats! Super Show!, an American action-comedy television series which aired on the United States cable network The Hub. The 1st season premiered on March 3, 2012 and finished on June 16, 2012 following a run of 13 episodes. The series' 2nd season began airing on June 1, 2013 and concluded on June 29 following a brief run of 5 episodes, while 3 half-hour "specials" aired on December 21 and 28, 2013, and on January 18, 2014. In July 2014, The Aquabats revealed that The Hub had opted not to renew Super Show! for a 3rd season, effectively cancelling the series.

The synopses below summarize the main live-action storyline for each episode. If applicable, also included in each capsule synopsis are brief summaries of the episode's animated segments - annotated by the title A Cartoon!, which may or may not consist of the Lil' Bat shorts - and parody commercials, labeled as Commercial. The list of Songs includes all songs either performed by The Aquabats or a similarly significant character but excludes score and incidental music, otherwise mentioned under Song Notes.

== Series overview ==
Season	Episodes	Originally released	
Season	Episodes	First released	Last released
Pilot		July 25, 2008	
1	13	March 3, 2012	June 16, 2012
2	8	June 1, 2013	January 18, 2014

== Episodes ==
=== Pilot (2008) ===
Title	Directed by	Written by	Original U.S. air date
"The Aquabats Super Show!"	Christian Jacobs and Scott Schultz	Christian Jacobs and Scott Schultz	July 25, 2008
Framed around an Aquabats concert (shot at the El Rey Theatre), the band presents 2 stories before an audience of fans. The Aquabats! in... Tortilla Trouble!: In a live-action segment, The Aquabats are attacked by a giant tortilla monster. Tracking it down to a remote Mexican village where it has grown even larger after being exposed to random toxic waste, the band works together to blow it up and provide the village children with plenty of delicious chips and guacamole. The Aquabats In... It's a Beautiful Under World: In an animated segment, The Aquabats attempt to bypass L.A. traffic by drilling underground in their BattleTram, only to find themselves in a lost underground where they're held captive by a sadistic unicorn. Guest starring Chris Phillips as the Narrator. Commercials: The Aquabats! Hovercraft 4000; InstaBro: The Party Buddy™ Songs: "The Aquabats! Super Show Theme Song!" (original version), "We Can Do It!", "This Is the Place", "Awesome Forces!" (from Charge!!)

=== Season 1 (2012) ===
In the series' 1st season, the A Cartoon! segments hosted 13 animated shorts featuring The Aquabats in a serialized adventure, with each ending in a cliffhanger resolved in the following episode. The Lil' Bat segments were presented without introductions, typically after a (network) commercial break.

No. in series	No. in season	Title	Directed by	Written by	Original U.S. air date	Production Code
1	1	"ManAnt!"	Jason deVilliers	Story by : Jason deVilliers, Christian Jacobs, & Dani Michaeli; Teleplay by : Dani Michaeli	March 3, 2012	101
While investigating a series of bizarre attacks on fast food restaurants, Crash is captured by the maniacal ManAnt, a half-man, half-ant creature who plans to siphon Crash's growth power to create an army of giant ants and take over the world. Meanwhile, skipping lunch as they attempt to find Crash, The Aquabats try not to let their hunger stand in the way of stopping ManAnt's scheme. Guest starring Mr. Lawrence as the voice of ManAnt, Art Mitchell as the body of ManAnt and Rip Taylor as Magic Genie. A Cartoon!: The BattleTram, sent into space by Space Monster "M", crash lands on the surface of the moon. The MC Bat Commander is kidnapped by a telepathic alien named Moon Cheese, while the rest of the band come under attack by a swarm of space bees (the deadliest bees in space). Lil' Bat: Lil' Bat Makes Breakfast! Commercial: Harry Hider Pine Scented Hair Shield Songs: "We Don't Stop", "Burger Rain"
2	2	"Mysterious Egg!"	Jason deVilliers	Evan Sinclair	March 10, 2012	102
When The Aquabats stumble upon a curiously large egg hidden deep in a forest, they decide to incubate it until it hatches, unaware of what danger lies within. Once the egg opens to reveal a mutated bird monster which proceeds to attack the band, Jimmy The Robot's maternal instincts kick in, rendering him too emotionally attached to the creature - which he has named "Jimmy Jr." - to destroy it and save his friends. Guest starring Mega64 (Derrick Acosta, Rocco Botte and Shawn Chatfield) as HandiGel actors (uncredited). A Cartoon!: After fending off the space bees, the Aquabats go off in search of the Commander only to wind up in the clutches of Moon Cheese, who plans to steal the Commander's mind energy to power an Earth-destroying Moon laser. Lil' Bat: Lil' Bat Opens A Coconut! Commercial: HandiGel Sanitary Gel Songs: "Space Bees", "A Robot Can Only Dream"
3	3	"EagleClaw!"	Matt Chapman	Matt Chapman, Matthew Gorney, & Dallas McLaughlin	March 17, 2012	103
Tensions and egos rise among The Aquabats after EagleBones' showboating guitar solos disrupt one of the band's concerts, prompting him to leave the group and "go solo". However, when EagleBones' estranged evil brother EagleClaw appears to challenge his kin to a guitar showdown, EagleBones' hubris gets the better of him, and it takes a spiritual vision and the aide of an invisible eagle to help him learn the true meaning of teamwork. Guest starring Jon Heder as EagleClaw, Lou Diamond Phillips as the Spirit of the Sun and Warren Fitzgerald as Dumpster Diver. A Cartoon!: After escaping from Moon Cheese and his Moon Shadow soldiers, The Aquabats wind up in a cavern where Jimmy is kidnapped by a gigantic moon octopus. Lil' Bat: Lil' Bat Humiliates A Ghost! Commercial: High Tides Songs: "The Legend Is True!" (From Hi-Five Soup!), "B-R-O"
4	4	"Laundry Day!"	Jason deVilliers	Warren Fitzgerald	March 24, 2012	104
Following a messy encounter with a gang of muck monsters at the city dump, The Aquabats head to their local laundromat to get their outfits cleaned. Unbeknownst to the band, the laundromat has been commandeered by the evil Dr. Eva Mudlark, a disgruntled scientist who creates monsters out of dirt and garbage, who seeks revenge against The Aquabats for killing her muck beasts. Guest starring Kate Towne as Dr. Eva Mudlark, Art Mitchell as Trusty Dusty, and Warren Fitzgerald as Hobo #1. A Cartoon!: Finding a Victorian-era submarine on the Moon, The Aquabats give chase through a series of underground lakes in search of Jimmy, who awakens to find himself imprisoned in strange dungeon. Lil' Bat: Lil' Bat humiliates a shark! Commercial: Ring in a Can Songs: "The Good Life", "Guy Stuff"
5	5	"LadyFingers!"	Jason deVilliers	Richard Grant Bennett & Jason deVilliers	March 31, 2012	105
During a leisurely night drive, The Aquabats save a group of partying beachgoers from a gang of laser-blasting mummies. Making a hasty retreat in their BattleTram, with the mummies in hot pursuit on motorcycles, the band continues the party on board, where Ricky falls smitten with a fellow party guest, unaware she's actually a 3-headed siren in disguise bent on destroying everyone in sight. Guest starring Janet Paraiso as Quera, Hera & Vera. A Cartoon!: After engaging in a heated submarine battle with the Moon octopus, The Aquabats discover a hidden underwater city where Jimmy's being held. Commercial: Tiny Burgers Songs: "Lady in the Corner", "Isn't It Lovely?"; Song notes: Though not performed in the episode, "B.F.F.!" (from Hi-Five Soup!) is heard in the background of a party scene. In another party sequence, 2 non-Aquabats songs are played, "Beat Fishin'" and "Wednesday" (a parody of "Friday" by Rebecca Black). Episode notes: This episode does not feature a Lil' Bat cartoon.
6	6	"Haunted BattleTram!"	Matt Chapman	Dan Kelly & Christian Jacobs	April 7, 2012	106
While goofing around in a spooky cemetery, the MC Bat Commander discovers a delicious burrito sitting atop a gravestone and decides to take it with him, unwittingly inviting a ghost into the BattleTram determined to get it back. With The Aquabats frightened out of their wits, the band is stuck trying to find a way to banish the phantom before he causes any more damage. Guest starring Matt Chapman as Bob Higginsbottom. A Cartoon!: As Jimmy contemplates how to escape from the Underwater King's dungeon, The Aquabats breach the underwater city's dome to bust him out, flooding the city in the process. Lil' Bat: Lil' Bat Finds An Onion! Commercial: Mummy Spray Songs: "What Is Friendship?", "Personal Property"
7	7	"Cowboy Android!"	Jason deVilliers	Jason deVilliers & Christian Jacobs	April 14, 2012	107
After the BattleTram runs out of gas in the middle of the desert, The Aquabats stumble across a peculiar Old West-styled town hidden in the hills. Soon discovering the town is actually a realistic theme park whose visitors have been held captive by a malfunctioning robot gunslinger (an homage to the 1973 movie Westworld), the band tries to devise a plan to save everyone from his clutches, enlisting the help of a flying naked mole-rat monster along the way. Guest starring Paul Scheer as The Cowboy Android Sheriff. A Cartoon: As the underwater city collapses around them, The Aquabats rescue Jimmy from the flood, only to realize that the water has short-circuited his hardware, paralyzing him. Commercial: The Aquabats! Lil' Bat Video Player! Songs: "Winging It", "Cowboy Android Theme Song"
8	8	"Überchaun!"	Jason deVilliers	Jason deVilliers & Richard Grant Bennett	April 21, 2012	108
During a rousing round of golf, The Aquabats accidentally cross paths with the Überchaun, a malevolent blue leprechaun, who places a curse upon the band members. To avoid being cursed forever, The Aquabats are given 3 challenges to complete, squaring off against killer trees, a grass monster, two mean old ladies, and an army of hyperactive gophers. Guest starring Dana Michael Woods as the Überchaun. A Cartoon!: Escaping from the moon just before it explodes, The Aquabats discover Jimmy is infested with alien parasites. Lil' Bat: Lil' Bat Terrorizes Some Ants! Commercial: Slushi Songs: "We Got This", "Summertime!"
9	9	"Pilgrim Boy!"	Jason deVilliers	Tyler Jacobs	April 28, 2012	109
The Aquabats meet Pilgrim Boy, a fellow superhero and inexplicable Pilgrim who possesses the power to shapeshift into anything, despite causing him physical pain in the process. After the band pester Pilgrim Boy one too many times to change into various things for their amusement, he gets fed up and leaves The Aquabats to face a giant potato bug attacking the Detroit pineapple plantation by themselves. Guest starring Samm Levine as Pilgrim Boy and "Weird Al" Yankovic as President Stuntcastin. A Cartoon!: In an attempt to rid Jimmy of his brain parasites, The Aquabats shrink down to size and venture inside his body to reboot his system. Meanwhile, the BattleTram is attacked by a vicious space worm. Lil' Bat: Lil' Bat Jumiliates A Fly! Commercial: Snakey Snacks Songs: "You Have No Idea", "The World Is Passing Us By"
10	10	"Floating Eye Of Death!"	Matt Chapman	Tyler Jacobs, Matt Chapman, & Christian Jacobs	May 19, 2012	110
Exhausted after a playing a rock concert, The Aquabats pull into an isolated truck stop to catch some sleep. Their peace and quiet is short-lived, however, when the mythical Floating Eye Of Death invades their rest area, transforming its inhabitants into mindless zombie drones. Holing up in the convenience store, The Aquabats must find a way to defeat the floating menace before they too start falling victim to its soul-stealing powers. Guest starring Becca Greene as Tina. A Cartoon!: As Jimmy's anti-virus software kicks in and eradicates his brain parasites, The Aquabats race to escape from Jimmy's body before they too are destroyed. Commercial: Stooped Fone! Songs: "The Shark Fighter!" (From Hi-Five Soup!), "Feel My Steel" Song notes: Though not performed in the episode, an instrumental section of "Hello, Good Night!" from, appropriately, the band's 1999 album The Aquabats vs. the Floating Eye of Death! is heard in the background of several scenes.
11	11	"Night Of The Cactus!"	Matt Chapman	Matt Chapman	May 26, 2012	111
When a strange meteorite crashes in the desert, The Aquabats arrive at the scene hoping to sell it for some quick cash, only to find it possesses dangerous otherworldly powers. With The MC Bat Commander horribly mutated from its effects, the band must find a way to not only restore their leader to his former self but also rescue a nearby woman from the clutches of a crazy cactus monster brought to life by the meteorite's same powers. Guest starring Paul Rust as Ronmark, Kate Freund as Zalga and Finau Tafua as the Cactus Monster. A Cartoon!: After escaping from Jimmy's body and successfully dodging the space worm, The Aquabats set a course for a strange nearby planet to repair the BattleTram. Commercial: S.C.A.B.S. Songs: "Doing Science", "Don't Break My Heart"
12	12	"CobraMan!"	Matt Chapman & Jason deVilliers	Jason deVilliers	June 2, 2012	112
In the midst of traveling on a world tour, The Aquabats are lured into a shady roadside sideshow advertising a "real-life CobraMan", only to end up having the BattleTram stolen by a wrestling mask-wearing carnival barker named Carl (modeled after co-director/performer Chapman's Strong Bad character). Facing certain unemployment without transportation, the band must challenge Carl to an all-or-nothing duel with his CobraMan monster to reclaim their vehicle, or else they'll have to return to their day jobs. Guest starring Matt Chapman as Carl, Keeley Larson as Scruffy Scruff actress and Brad Davis as the voice of CobraMan. A Cartoon!: When the Battletram lands on a planet inhabited by friendly barbarians (the Gnarbarians), The Aquabats try to find a way back home with the aid of a magic dagger. Commercial: Scruffy Scruff Songs: "Awesome Forces!" (From Charge!!), "Totally Gnarly Gnarbarian Party"
13	13	"Showtime!"	Jason deVilliers	Christian Jacobs & Dominic Abeyta	June 16, 2012	113
Down on their luck and out of money, The Aquabats try to find an opportunity to re-establish their superhero status in order to help sell their surplus of merchandise. When an impending alien invasion masterminded by the diabolical Space Monster "M" defeats the city's other, far more competent superhero teams, it's up to The Aquabats alone to summon their collective strengths and stop him before he destroys the planet. Guest starring "Weird Al" Yankovic as SuperMagic PowerMan!, Stephanie Allynne as Lanolin Lady!, and Dallas McLaughlin as Space Monster "M". Aquabats members Corey Pollock and Boyd Terry appear as fellow superheroes Chainsaw and Catboy, their respective Aquabats stage names. A Cartoon!: Using the magic dagger to repair the BattleTram, The Aquabats fly into space where they meet The Time Sprinkler, who throws the band into a time loop repeating the last year of their lives, effectively sending them back to the series' first episode. Commercial: Poppin' Shocker! Electrode Suit Songs: "It's Showtime!", "We Don't Stop" (reprise) Episode notes: This episode does not feature a Lil' Bat cartoon.

=== Season 2 (2013–2014) ===
Season 2 did not feature the serialized A Cartoon! segments of the previous season, instead featuring uniquely animated flashback sequences in the first 5 episodes. Starting with the season's 2nd episode, the A Cartoon! segments were used to introduce the Lil' Bat cartoons featured in every episode.

No. in series	No. in season	Title	Directed by	Written by	Original U.S. air date	Production Code
14	1	"The Return of The Aquabats!"	Jason deVilliers	Christian Jacobs	June 1, 2013	201
Following their previous encounter with Space Monster M, The Aquabats crash-land back on Earth, awakening to realize they have no memory of what happened or who they are. Hailed as heroes by the adoring public, the band starts slowly piecing together their identities. After managing to destroy a rampaging mutated Ronmark (from the episode "Night of the Cactus!"), the band find themselves overwhelmed with demands from citizens seeking their help. Guest starring Tony Hawk as Journalist #1, Eric Koston as Journalist #2 and Paul Rust as the Voice of Ronmark. Animated Segment: EagleBones explains in an animated flashback how he came to join The Aquabats, meeting the band in a desert roadhouse during an nomadicy journey. This segment is animated in a rotoscoping technique inspired by the 1981 film Heavy Metal. Lil' Bat: Lil' Bat Has A Dream! Commercial: Sonic Boom 3000 Songs: "Help Me!" Episode notes: This is the only episode of the series not to feature an A Cartoon! segment.
15	2	"The Thingy!"	Jason deVilliers	Story by : Richard Grant Bennett & Jason deVilliers; Teleplay by : Warren Fitzgerald, Matt Chapman & Jason deVilliers	June 8, 2013	202
While returning home from a relaxing ski vacation, The Aquabats get trapped in a snow embankment and are forced to spend the night without power in the BattleTram. In an overt parody of the 1982 film The Thing, a malicious shape shifting alien sneaks aboard the vehicle after disposing of Jimmy to assume his form and enacts a scheme to turn the Battle Wagon into a rocket to return to his galaxy while having the human Aquabat members turned into rocket fuel. Successfully evading capture, Crash must learn to overcome his fears and rescue his pals from certain doom. Animated Segment: Crash remembers how he met the other The Aquabats "on his first day of public school" (quoting the band's 2000 song "Pizza Day!"). This segment was animated by Shmorky of the humor website Something Awful. A Cartoon!: Lil' Bat Drinks A Soda Pop! Commercial: Meal-A-Rang Songs: "I'm a Bad Thingy!" Episode notes: Season 2 was played out of order in the original run on The Hub. Episode as per official listing on the band's YouTube page.
16	3	"Bad Apple!"	Jason deVilliers	Richard Grant Bennett & Jason deVilliers	June 15, 2013	203
After a giant mutant "flea beetle" attacks a local supermarket, The Aquabats trace it to a nearby farm growing genetically enlarged produce, which happens to be run by Jimmy the Robot's estranged parents. Tensions rise between Jimmy and his eccentric scientist father over Jimmy having abandoned his farm life, but when a gigantic mutant worm swallows Jimmy's mother, the 2 must work together to rescue her. Guest starring Mark Mothersbaugh and J.J. Neward as Jimmy's parents, Ralph and Martha Goodman. Animated Segment: Jimmy explains his version of how he joined The Aquabats, answering a newspaper ad for a band seeking a saxophone-playing robot. This segment utilizes an early computer animation style reminiscent of the Dire Straits' "Money For Nothing" music video. A Cartoon!: Lil' Bat plays tennis! Commercial: Dirt Clod Songs: "Open The Worm!"
17	4	"Summer Camp!"	Jason deVilliers	Matt Chapman & Dan Kelly	June 22, 2013	204
The Aquabats spend the summer participating at Camp RadVentures, a summer camp where kids are trained in The Aquabats' superpowers to become AquaCadets. When a group of campers are kidnapped in the middle of the night, the band realizes it's the work of a mythical shapeshifting beast, and the Commander's suspicions quickly fall upon the camp's beloved and irrepressibly perky counselor Jewel. Guest starring Leslie Hall as Camp Counselor Jewel. Animated Segment: The MC Bat Commander tells about The Aquabats' origins, recounting the band's original Aquabania mythos while quoting from their 1997 song "Theme Song!". This segment is animated in the same Anime style of the 1st season's cartoons. A Cartoon!: Lil' Bat Uses A Microwave! Commercial: Captain Turnip's Grocery Island Songs: "Summa Camp!", "The AquaCadet Anthem!" Episode notes: Season 2 was played out of order in the original run on The Hub. Episode as per official listing on the band's YouTube page.
18	5	"The Anti-Bats!"	Jason deVilliers & Gerard Way	Gerard Way, Christian Jacobs & Jason deVilliers	June 29, 2013	205
When The Aquabats act as judges for a local Battle of the Bands contest, Ricky falls in love with one of the performers, mediocre folk singer Rachel Moonbug, rigging the vote in her favor and infuriating the other contestants, death metal band Asthma and dubstep artist Skillsawz. Sensing their desire for revenge, the nefarious Silver Skull bestows Asthma and Skillsawz with his dark powers, transforming them into "The AntiBats" and sending them forth to destroy The Aquabats. Meanwhile, Ricky quits the band to run off with Rachel Moonbug, but as the Silver Skull and The AntiBats close in on The Aquabats, he must make a choice between true love and saving his friends. Guest starring Mark Fordham as Silver Skull, Mikey Way as Asthma Lead Singer, Noël Wells as Rachel Moonbug and Martin Starr as Shred Center MC; Animated Segment : Ricky remembers how he came to join The Aquabats, recalling his early life in the dance crews on the streets of Hi-Five City. This segment utilizes stop motion animation. A Cartoon!: Lil' Bat Goes To The Dentist! Commercial: Popcorn Pants Songs: "Everybody Needs Somebody Hugging!", "Young & Attractive!"
19	6	"Christmas With The Aquabats!"	Jason deVilliers	Tyler Jacobs	December 21, 2013	301
After getting lost on their way to a Christmas tree lighting ceremony, The Aquabats arrive in a remote village ruled by the tyrannical Krampus, a demonic beast-like creature who has outlawed all mention and celebration of Christmas under penalty of severe lashings with a switch. The overly-festive Aquabats are promptly captured and incarcerated by the townsfolk, and their only hope for rescue lies with the big man himself, Santa Claus. Guest starring Robert Smigel as the voice of the Krampus, Matt Walsh as Santa Claus and Jordan Burt as Marco. A Cartoon!: Lil' Bat Goes Caroling! Commercial: Christmas Tree Man Songs: "Christmas Is Special to Me!", "Christmas Is Awesome!"
20	7	"The Shark Fighter!"	Jason Hatfield	Chad Larson	December 28, 2013	302
When a gang of vicious mutant land sharks emerge from the sea to wreak havoc on land, The Aquabats join forces with the legendary Shark Fighter, a wavy-haired ocean vigilante on a self-imposed quest to fight sharks. Impressed by his potential, the Shark Fighter takes Crash under his wing to teach him the art of shark fighting, but Crash may just see more in the Shark Fighter as the big brother he's always wanted. Guest starring Rhys Darby as The Shark Fighter. A Cartoon!: Lil' Bat Grows A Plant! Commercial: Little Brother Song notes: Though not performed onscreen, the song "The Shark Fighter!" from The Aquabats' 2011 album Hi-Five Soup! is played during Crash's training montage, while an orchestral arrangement of the song plays throughout the episode.
21	8	"Kitty Litter!"	Munn Powell	Story by : Evan Sinclair; Teleplay by : Matt Chapman	January 18, 2014	303
When the city's cutest kittens start being abducted by gigantic teleporting cat men, The Aquabats trace it back to Kitty Litter, a ferocious feline using unwilling kittens to power a gigantic cat robot as part of a scheme to cover the planet with garbage. When most of the band are kidnapped by Kitty Litter, it's up to Crash to get over his pet dander allergies and save the world from becoming a global trash heap. Guest starring Ben Garant as the voice of Kitty Litter and Julia Prescott as Gina. A Cartoon!: Lil' Bat Raises A Fish! Commercial: Skeletiger Songs: "Cat Fight!"

== Mini-episodes (2018–2025) ==
In July 2018, following the launch of The Aquabats' Kickstarter campaign to help finance the return of The Aquabats! Super Show!, the band began releasing "mini-episodes" exclusively to their YouTube channel, both as means to promote the campaign as well as to serve as a continuation of the original series' canon.

=== The Aquabats! Saturday Morning! (2018) ===
No. overall	No. in series	Title	Original release date
1	1	"The Wizard of Hollywood!"	July 31, 2018 (re-uploaded August 28, 2018)
The MC Bat Commander pays a visit to the all-powerful Wizard of Hollywood and begs for his help to bring back The Aquabats! Super Show!. The Wizard agrees to aide the Commander, summoning his "legion of righteous comrades" for assistance, using a mystical animal horn whose sound turns those in its range into costume-clad Aquabats. Guest starring Jack Black as the Wizard of Hollywood, Robert Smigel as Triumph the Insult Comic Dog, Matt Chapman as Homestar Runner and Strong Bad, Tom Lennon as Lieutenant Jim Dangle and Adrian Young, Tom Dumont, "Weird Al" Yankovic, Oscar Nunez, Kate Micucci, Blake Anderson, Imagine Dragons, Travis Barker, Phil Lord and Christopher Miller, Felicia Day and Marty Krofft as themselves.
2	2	"The Return of SilverSkull!"	August 3, 2018
After visiting the Wizard of Hollywood and talking his way out of a parking ticket, the Commander rushes off to save Jimmy the Robot from his new job. Meanwhile, Silver Skull hatches a new plan to destroy The Aquabats.
3	3	"The Sand Crawler!"	August 8, 2018
Learning that Jimmy was sold by his former employer to a group of scavengers (depicted as an overt parody of Jawas from Star Wars), the Commander tracks them down in the desert and challenges them to a dance-off in exchange for his friend.
4	4	"Fortnite Dance Off!"	August 13, 2018
Failing the dance contest miserably, the Commander uses his mystical animal horn to turn the scavengers into Aquabats, thereby winning their support. Now rescued from the scrap heap, Jimmy informs the Commander that Silver Skull has been behind The Aquabats' separation. The two take off in the BattleTram to rescue EagleBones FalconHawk.
5	5	"Powdered MilkMan!"	August 15, 2018
Tracking down EagleBones, now working as a waiter in a fancy restaurant, the Commander and Jimmy attempt to convince him to rejoin The Aquabats, only to be interrupted by the arrival of Powdered Milk Man.
6	6	"Powdered MilkMan Returns!"	August 22, 2018
Powdered Milk Man attempts to attack The Aquabats but is quickly subdued by Jimmy's projectile weaponry and some breakfast cereal. Now free from his restaurant job, EagleBones rejoins The Aquabats and they take off to reunite the rest of the team, unaware that Silver Skull is close on their tail. Guest starring Patton Oswalt as Mr. Efron/Powdered Milk Man.
7	7	"At the Beach!"	August 27, 2018
The Aquabats catch up with Ricky, now an unsuccessful fruit vendor at the beach, but are intercepted by Silver Skull, who destroys the Commander's mystical horn and therefore their means to help recruit new Comrades. Their spirits broken, the remaining Aquabats nonetheless leave to find Crash.
8	8	"It's CobraMan!"	August 31, 2018
While wandering about the desert looking for Crash, The Aquabats stumble into CobraMan and Silver Skull, who lure them into a trap to be destroyed by a ferocious battle beast.
9	9	"ManAnt Returns!"	September 6, 2018
After a brief fight, The Aquabats discover the battle beast is in fact Crash in disguise as part of his new job. The rest of the band convince him to rejoin The Aquabats and play a benefit show in Los Angeles to recruit more people into the Legion of Righteous Comrades. An emotional Crash, now grown to super-size, stomps on CobraMan and Silver Skull as the group departs. Laying weakened on the ground, the two villains are approached by ManAnt, who proposes an idea to ruin The Aquabats' benefit concert.

=== The Aquabats! RadVentures! (2019–2025) ===
No. overall	No. in series	Title	Original release date
1	1	"Horsebeard Man!"	September 28, 2019
2	2	"Martian Girl!"	October 26, 2019
3	3	"The Mauler!"	November 10, 2019
4	4	"Lotto Fever!"	November 24, 2019
5	5	"Ninja Kidz!"	December 22, 2019
6	6	"No Fit Shape!"	January 25, 2020
7	7	"EagleBones Gets A Cape!"	March 7, 2020
8	8	"Pizza Pocket!"	March 28, 2020
9	9	"Shrinky Bats!"	May 11, 2020
10	10	"Clowny Clown Clown! 1"	May 26, 2021
11	11	"Clowny Clown Clown! 2"	July 31, 2021
12	12	"Spider Hunter!"	February 22, 2025
