= Burger Rain =

Single by The Aquabats
- B-side: "Beat Fishin'"
- Released: July 12, 2017
- Genre: Comedy pop
- Length: 3:30
- Songwriters: Richard Falomir, Matthew Gorney
- Producer: Cameron Webb

The Aquabats singles chronology
"The Shark Fighter!" (2010)	"Burger Rain" (2017)	"Skeleton Inside!" (2019)

B-side
- "Beat Fishin'"

"Burger Rain" is a song by American band The Aquabats, released as a 7" single in July 2017.

"Burger Rain", as well as its B-side "Beat Fishin'", is an alternate, full-length recording of a song from the first season of The Aquabats' 2012-2014 television series The Aquabats! Super Show!. Both songs would later appear on the soundtrack compilation The Aquabats! Super Show! Television Soundtrack: Volume One, released in 2019.

== Overview ==
=== Background ===
Composed by Aquabats drummer Richard Falomir (Ricky Fitness) and collaborator Matthew Gorney, "Burger Rain" was written for The Aquabats' cable television series The Aquabats! Super Show!, where it was featured in the series' premiere episode "ManAnt!". Within the context of the episode, the villain ManAnt and his minions attack the city's burger restaurants to draw the attention of The Aquabats as part of a ploy to capture bassist Crash McLarson - who has the superpower of growing to enormous size - and harnessing his growth powers to create an army of giant ants. Following ManAnt's defeat, an enlarged McLarson tears open a giant anthill, revealing a massive stash of burgers which he proceeds to shower over his hungry and regular-sized bandmates as they sing the song.

=== Recording, reception and release ===
The version of "Burger Rain" performed in Super Show! runs for approximately one and a half minutes. In a 2012 interview, series co-creator and lead singer Christian Jacobs (MC Bat Commander) revealed that "Burger Rain", among other songs written for the show, had been recorded in both full and abbreviated versions in the hope of eventually releasing a soundtrack album.

Critical reception to "Burger Rain"'s performance on Super Show! was largely positive, with Wired magazine calling the "borderline erotic spoof of Prince's 'Purple Rain'" as "wonderfully strange" and ToonZone noting it was "exactly as weird and funny as it sounds". Almost immediately, "Burger Rain" became a staple of The Aquabats' live shows, most often performed near the end of their set and often accompanied by the release of large inflatable cheeseburgers.

Although The Aquabats' intentions of a full soundtrack had not come to fruition by 2017, on May 11, 2017, the band announced plans to release "Burger Rain" and "Beat Fishin'" as a 7" single as part of a fan ticket package for an upcoming tour which commenced on July 12 in St. Louis, Missouri. The single version of "Burger Rain" is an alternate recording, featuring a second and third verse and running three and a half minutes in length.

In April 2019, "Burger Rain" was released to major streaming services as a B-side to the Super Show! song "Cobraman Theme!". Both songs, as well as "Beat Fishin'", were widely released on digital and physical media as part of The Aquabats! Super Show! Television Soundtrack: Volume One on June 7, 2019.

=== "Beat Fishin'" ===
The B-side to "Burger Rain" is "Beat Fishin'", another song taken from the soundtrack of The Aquabats! Super Show!, specifically the episode "Ladyfingers!", in which it's played during a party scene. Like "Burger Rain", the song is an alternate recording extended to full length. The cover of "Beat Fishin'" depicts Super Show! and Yo Gabba Gabba! producer Justin Lyon's head placed on a stock photo of a fisherman's body with exaggerated bling-bling, catching a turntable with a fishing rod.

== Personnel ==
The Aquabats

- MC Bat Commander - vocals
- Crash McLarson - bass, backing vocals
- Jimmy the Robot - keyboards, backing vocals
- Ricky Fitness - drums, backing vocals
- Eagle "Bones" Falconhawk - guitar, backing vocals
