= The Shark Fighter! =

Single by The Aquabats

from the album Hi-Five Soup!
- Released: December 14, 2010
- Recorded: 2010
- Genre: Pop rock, comedy rock, new wave
- Length: 2:56
- Label: Fearless Records
- Songwriter: The Aquabats
- Producer: Cameron Webb

The Aquabats singles chronology
"Radio Down!" (2010)	"The Shark Fighter!" (2010)	"Burger Rain" (2017)

"The Shark Fighter!" is a song by American band The Aquabats from their fifth studio album Hi-Five Soup!, released on Fearless Records in 2011. The song was issued as a single in December 2010, the second single released from Hi-Five Soup! following "Radio Down!" in November 2010.

== Overview ==
Like a good number of The Aquabats' songs such as "Captain Hampton and the Midget Pirates!" or "Tiger Rider vs. the Time Sprinkler!", "The Shark Fighter!" is a humorous narrative centered on the outlandish adventures of a fictional character. In this instance, the song pertains to the eponymous Shark Fighter, a wavy-haired ocean vigilante who dedicates his life to avenging the implied shark-related death of his past lover by single-handedly fighting the sea's shark population, with the song noting "He will not die/Until all sharks cry".

Musically, the song follows in the same guitar-driven pop rock direction as most of Hi-Five Soup!, featuring The Aquabats' characteristic new wave-influenced synthesizer melodies, a type of sound which Punknews.org specifically described as being like "Devo on a sugar high". The instrumentation of the song additionally features an introductory timpani roll and a simulated choir to lend the track a grand and pseudo-orchestral feel.

== Release and reception ==
On December 14, The Aquabats released "The Shark Fighter!" as an exclusive stream on their official Facebook page. On January 4, 2011, two weeks before the release of Hi-Five Soup!, "The Shark Fighter!" was released to iTunes as a downloadable single.

While critical response to Hi-Five Soup! was generally mixed, "The Shark Fighter!" received almost unanimous praise as one of the album's standout tracks and one of The Aquabats' overall best songs. Punk publication DyingScene listed "The Shark Fighter!" as one of the album's tracks which "definitely hold up to the sound of their past albums", sentiments echoed by the likes of Geekscape, who called the "wackiness" of the song's concept "classic 'Bats", and the OC Weekly newspaper, who opened their review with the first line of the song, writing "And with those words...The Aquabats are once again at it".

== The Aquabats! Super Show! ==
Though no music video for "The Shark Fighter!" was ever filmed, the narrative of the song was later adapted into an episode of the same name for The Aquabats' live-action television series The Aquabats! Super Show! and aired as the twentieth episode of the series on December 28, 2013.

Written by bassist Chad Larson (Crash McLarson), the episode centers on The Aquabats encountering the mythical Shark Fighter, played by guest star Rhys Darby, after he saves them from a roving gang of "land sharks". The band become endeared to the Shark Fighter, in particular Crash, who views him as a brotherly figure after he's selected to train as the Shark Fighter's apprentice. As Crash begins to distance himself from the rest of The Aquabats to study under the Shark Fighter, he's ultimately forced to decide between his loyalty to his new mentor or to his friends when another group of land sharks attack the city.

The studio version of "The Shark Fighter!" is played during a training montage in the episode depicting Crash training under the Shark Fighter, while an orchestral sting derived from the song's melody is played several times throughout the episode. Several lyrics from the song are quoted verbatim or near-verbatim by both the Shark Fighter and The Aquabats.

== Credits ==
The Aquabats

- The MC Bat Commander - vocals
- Crash McLarson - bass, vocals
- Eagle "Bones" Falconhawk - guitar, vocals
- Jimmy the Robot - keyboards, vocals
- Ricky Fitness - drums

Additional musicians

- Corey "Chainsaw: The Prince of Karate" Pollock - additional guitar
