= Krunk =

Krunk may refer to:

- Krunk (society), a cultural-charitable society in Abkhazia, 1990–2004
- Krunk or Crunk, a subgenre of hip hop music
- KrunK, renamed Kottak, an American punk rock/pop punk group
- Krúnk, the record label run by Icelandic band Sigur Rós
- Atlanta Krunk Wolverines or Charlotte Krunk, renamed Augusta Groove, an American basketball team
- Krunk UAV, an Armenian unmanned aerial vehicle

== Arts, media, and entertainment ==
- Krunk (Crash Bandicoot), a character in the video game series
- Krunk (Transformers), a character in The Transformers: Headmasters, a Marvel comics mini-series
- Krunk (profanity), a fictional expletive on American television series Late Night with Conan O'Brien
- The Infraggable Krunk, a purple superhero in The Justice Friends segment of the animated television series Dexter's Laboratory
- Krunk, a character in the television series Tim and Eric Awesome Show, Great Job!

== See also ==
- Crunk (disambiguation)
- Kronk (disambiguation)
