= Gogua =

Gogua (Georgian: გოგუა) is a Georgian surname. Notable people with the surname include:

- Alexey Gogua (1932–2025), Abkhaz writer
- Gogita Gogua (born 1983), Georgian footballer
