= Falomir =

Falomir is a surname. Notable people with the surname include:

- María Laura Corradini Falomir (born 1975), known professionally as Chenoa, Argentine-Spanish singer-songwriter
- Richard Falomir (fl. from 1996), American musician and composer
