= Hi-Five Soup! =

Studio album by The Aquabats
- Released: January 18, 2011
- Recorded: 2010 at Maple Studios in Orange County, California
- Genre: Pop-punk; new wave; synth-pop
- Length: 34:54
- Label: Fearless
- Producer: Cameron Webb, The Aquabats

The Aquabats chronology
| Radio Down! (2010) | Hi-Five Soup! (2011) | The Aquabats! Super Show! Television Soundtrack: Volume One (2019) |

Singles from Hi-Five Soup!
- 1. "Radio Down!" Released: November 9, 2010; 2. "The Shark Fighter!" Released: December 14, 2010

Hi-Five Soup! is the fifth studio album from American band The Aquabats, released on January 18, 2011 by Fearless Records.

== Overview ==
In interviews leading up to Hi-Five Soup!'s release, lead vocalist Christian Jacobs (The MC Bat Commander) described the album as "Yo Gabba Gabba!-meets-The Aquabats", noting "[the] themes of the songs are just kind of silly and stupid...it's less trying to appeal to a little bit older crowd and just trying to appeal to the Halloween costume crowd". Of the album's music, he mentioned "there's more stripped down punk kind of sounds" and "we have been relying a lot more on the keyboards and there's a lot more electronic stuff in there, but I think kids will be surprised that there are some songs that sound a lot like old school Aquabats".

Musically, Hi-Five Soup! continues in the guitar and keyboard-driven rock and new wave sounds that The Aquabats established on their previous album Charge!!, though incorporates slightly stronger elements of synthpop and electronica. The album also includes touches of hip-hop, present on songs such as "Hey Homies!", "Luck Dragon Lady!" and "Radio Down!", the latter featuring an appearance from Biz Markie, as well as a ska song, "In My Dreams!".

Lyrically, the album makes no deviation from The Aquabats' trademark style of comedic comic book-influenced narrative songs (most notably on "The Shark Fighter!") and pop culture homages (such as on "Luck Dragon Lady!", which is based on the 1984 fantasy film The NeverEnding Story and directly quotes a line from "Girl U Want" by Devo), while also retaining some of the geek-centric social satire present on Charge!!, as heard in "Pink Pants!" and "Just Can't Lose!".

Hi-Five Soup! is the first Aquabats studio album to feature guitarist Ian Fowles (Eagle "Bones" Falconhawk), who joined the band in 2006. Thus, it was also the first not to feature Falconhawk's predecessor Corey Pollock (Chainsaw, the Prince of Karate) as an official member, though Pollock did contribute guitar tracks to the album under the credit of an additional musician.

== Production history ==
In March 2010, after almost five years of minimal recording activity since the release of Charge!!, The Aquabats announced plans on their website to hopefully release a new studio album by the end of the year. The project went entirely unmentioned until October, when the band confirmed that an album had in fact been independently recorded with producer Cameron Webb and was set for release on November 9, 2010. However, The Aquabats secured a last-minute distribution deal with Fearless Records, who chose to push the release date to January 2011 to allow proper promotion and marketing, instead releasing the EP Radio Down! on November 9, containing the album's first single.

In mid-December, The Aquabats revealed the album's title and artwork, releasing its second single, "The Shark Fighter!", for digital download shortly thereafter. In promotion of the album, The Aquabats embarked on a tour supporting Reel Big Fish, playing 21 shows across the Midwest and east coast regions of the United States. In December 2011, the band underwent a five-show tour of Australia, their first visit to the continent.

Two months after Hi-Five Soup!'s release, it was announced that The Aquabats' independently filmed television pilot, The Aquabats! Super Show!, had been picked up as a series by United States cable channel The Hub. Spending most of 2011 in production, there was no further touring behind the album, nor was a music video produced. However, several songs from Hi-Five Soup! have appeared in the series, most prominently in the first-season episode "EagleClaw!", which included a live performance of "The Legend Is True!" filmed at a concert at The Glass House club in Pomona, California on November 5, 2011, and the second-season episode "The Shark Fighter!", which was based on the song of the same name and features both the original song and an orchestral arrangement.

== Reception ==
Upon its release, Hi-Five Soup! became the highest-charting Aquabats album since 1997's The Fury of The Aquabats!, peaking at 181 on the Billboard 200, as well as reaching 5 on Billboard's Top Heatseekers, the band's highest placement on the chart until 2019, when The Aquabats! Super Show! Television Soundtrack: Volume One debuted at number one.

Critical reception to Hi-Five Soup! was mostly positive, though many reviewers had slightly mixed feelings towards what they perceived was a prominent influence from Yo Gabba Gabba!, the popular children's television series Aquabats singer Christian Jacobs created and composed for, due to the album's light-hearted lyrical content and accessible synthpop and electronica elements. Punknews.org gave the album a 3.5 out of 5 star rating, feeling ambivalent towards the album's "kid-friendly" slant but stating "there’s still enough of the Aquabats’ exciting musical arrangements mixed with a newfound obsession with electronica alongside their zany cartoonish storytelling to make the album enjoyable for listeners of any age". Alternative Press echoed similar sentiments in another 3.5/5 rating, writing "While the Aquabats have never been known for mature songwriting, Hi-Five Soup! walks a thin line between fun pop-punk and a full-on children’s record", summarizing "The album is by no means a masterpiece, but the addition of a few of its most promising tunes to the Aquabats' live show will make the experience that much more entertaining for the parents and kids in the audience".

== Track listing ==
All tracks are written by The Aquabats.

| No. | Title | Writer(s) | Length |
|---|---|---|---|
| 1. | "The Shark Fighter!" | I. Fowles, C. Jacobs, C. Larson | 2:56 |
| 2. | "B.F.F.!" | R. Falomir, C. Jacobs, C. Larson | 3:20 |
| 3. | "The Legend Is True!" | J. Briggs, R. Falomir, I. Fowles, C. Jacobs, C. Larson | 3:21 |
| 4. | "Radio Down!" (Featuring Biz Markie) | R. Falomir, C. Jacobs | 3:31 |
| 5. | "Poppin' A Wheelie!" | | 2:15 |
| 6. | "Hey Homies!" | R. Falomir, C. Jacobs | 3:04 |
| 7. | "In My Dreams!" | C. Larson | 3:04 |
| 8. | "Just Can't Lose!" | C. Jacobs, C. Larson | 3:39 |
| 9. | "All My Money!" | J. Briggs, R. Falomir, I. Fowles, C. Jacobs | 2:48 |
| 10. | "Pink Pants!" (Featuring Strong Bad) | J. Briggs, I. Fowles, C. Jacobs, C. Larson | 2:31 |
| 11. | "Food Fight on the Moon!" | A. Deibert, C. Jacobs, C.Larson | 2:39 |
| 12. | "Luck Dragon Lady!" | R. Falomir, I. Walton, C. Jacobs, C. Larson | 3:46 |
| Total length: | | | 34:54 |

== Personnel ==
The Aquabats

- The MC Bat Commander – vocals
- Crash McLarson – bass, backing vocals
- Eagle "Bones" Falconhawk – guitar, backing vocals
- Jimmy The Robot – keyboards, backing vocals
- Ricky Fitness – drums, percussion, backing vocals

Additional musicians

- Biz Markie – vocals on "Radio Down!"
- Matt Chapman – vocals on "Pink Pants!"
- Chainsaw the Prince of Karate – additional guitars
- Hillary Haynie, Emma J. Deaver, Emily Greathouse, Elisabeth Larson, Cameron Webb, Evan Sinclair, Tyler Jacobs – backing vocals

== Charts ==
| Chart (2011) | Peak position |
|---|---|
| US Billboard 200 | 181 |
| US Heatseekers Albums (Billboard) | 5 |
| US Independent Albums (Billboard) | 24 |
| US Kid Albums (Billboard) | 7 |
| US Top Rock Albums (Billboard) | 45 |
