= List of Tim and Eric Awesome Show, Great Job! sketches and characters =

The following is a list of recurring characters and featured sketches from Tim and Eric Awesome Show, Great Job!. Some of the recurring characters on the list have also made appearances on Tom Goes To The Mayor and Check It Out! with Dr. Steve Brule.

== Characters ==
- James Quall – a standup comedian, celebrity impressionist, and singer that debuted during Season 2. He has also appeared on Tim & Eric Nite Live. He is famous for his bad impersonations of celebrities such as Bill Cosby, Bob Hope, Michael Jackson, and Jack Nicholson, as well as American presidents Gerald Ford and Ronald Reagan. He usually incorporates the phrase "spaghetti and meatballs" into his work. Quall has been featured singing self-styled songs such as "Beach Blast" and "The Car of the Future." Quall himself was impersonated by comedian Bill Hader for the fictional James Quall Story feature film during Season 3. Quall has often teamed with fellow recurring character David Liebe Hart in fictional movies such as Back to Squall, an Odd Couple-themed film starring Quall, "John A. Hill" (actor Jonah Hill), and Hart, about the misadventures of two roommates at Admiral David Liebe Hart's Sailing Quallage, in Season 4, and Quall of Duty, a police crime drama co-starring Hart, in Season 5. Quall is a personal friend and next door neighbor of Hart, and has appeared with him on Hart's Public-access television cable TV show in Los Angeles, California.
- Tairy Greene (Zach Galifianakis) – a multi-talented actor known for his work in a Gravy Robbers restaurant employee training video, as the lead-role in Little Dancing Man, and from the hit action television show The Snuggler, where he played a man who helps people by snuggling them. As The Snuggler, he rescued Tim from the woods after an attack by Chippy's mother, nursing him back to health with snuggles and rehabilitation. Tairy stars in the Snuggler video game, in which players must snuggle and earn energy crystals, which can be traded in for a number of green shields. He hosts the Tairy Greene Acting Seminar For Children. As a graduate of James Sprunt Community College and having studied under the tutelage of Randy Tutelage, Greene often embellishes his acting credentials and abilities, usually to the dismay of the children. He is perceived as a little bit crazy; he attributes this to having once stuck his tongue in a burrito. Greene directed the fictional Channel 5 movie Back To Squall and the fictional film Little Danson Man starring Ted Danson and David Cross. Cinco produces "The Tairy Greene Machine," a video jukebox pre-loaded with every appearance Greene had ever made. The device runs on "Greene technology," as it only runs on tap water.
- Casey Tatum (Heidecker) – A teenaged singer who is regularly featured on Uncle Muscle's Hour. Tatum is portrayed as being uncomfortable and easily overcome by extreme, debilitating stage fright, and is often on the threshold of either crying and/or vomiting. Tatum has a severe case of facial eczema, which he treats with generous applications of Vaseline. During his performances, Casey is accompanied by his unnamed, sunglasses-wearing brother (Wareheim), with the duo billed as "Casey and His Brother". He either dances or otherwise acts out the song alongside him. In the season 2 premiere "Vacation", it was revealed that during the events of the season 1 episode "Missing", Tatum had died in a fiery car crash at the age of 17; subsequent episodes would feature "classic" Casey and His Brother performances. In the season 5 episode "Reanimated", a young girl finds Casey's remains in the woods—which his brother uses to reassemble and reanimate him. However, during his comeback performance, his body falls apart.
- Richard Dunn – senior citizen who appears in nearly every episode since the first, in which he portrayed a congratulatory version of Tim's Dad. He hosted multiple shows on the Public-access television Channel 5, including Dunngeon and Getting It Dunn. He also hosted and officiated the Tim & Eric Tennis Challenge in the Season 4 finale "Tennis". In line with Tim and Eric's unique brand of humor, Dunn often mispronounces and slurs words and is frequently shown in a state of minor confusion. Dunn died Friday, June 4, 2010, due to complications from a stroke. The episode that aired on Sunday, June 6, on Adult Swim was dedicated to Dunn. He was 73.
- David Liebe Hart – a singer and puppeteer who performs listless songs with an assortment of ventriloquist dummies. His songs usually have positive, upbeat themes but are usually accompanied by his excessive voice vibrato. He almost always has a Bluetooth headset in his right ear, and is often accompanied by psychedelic green screen effects. He also co-starred in the fictional Channel 5 Tuesday Afternoon Movie Back to Squall as the headmaster of Admiral David Liebe Hart's Sailing Quallage. He stars as himself alongside Bill Hader in The James Quall Story. Hart often sings about aliens and seems to have a particular affinity for the Korendian race; he had to apologize in a season four episode after an uncharacteristically sexual remark about Korendian women's "spicy tacos."
- Palmer Scott – a middle-aged, overweight, balding man wearing what appears to be outdated Jordache apparel from the late '80s or early '90s. He is noted for his matching denim shirt and jeans, gyrating torso, and unusually spry pelvic thrusts. However, he is best known for what he does: he "sits on you". He also makes an appearance in Season 4, where a woman who appears to be pregnant requests that her "bub-bubs" be bounced. Where three men fail to bounce her bub-bubs, Palmer succeeds. In Season 2, his name was revealed to be Palmer Scott during the Channel 5 Dance Party.
- Michael Q. Schmidt – recurs in several episodes. Schmidt was part of Tom Goes to the Mayor as Tom's wife Joy, and has performed in several of the Awesome Show's live tours, as well as being 'Winter Man' for the Chrimbus Special.
- Pierre (actor/comedian Ron Austar) – a children's entertainer whose obsessions include young boys, their dads, and barbecue meat. Pierre frequently appears in videos purportedly intended for children but inevitably showcasing his fixations, such as a public service announcement informing children that "all the food is poison" and they should therefore eat something else, "Doo Dah Doo Doo" (a line dance that features increasingly suggestive directions, as well as lyrics expressing his desire to meet the participants' dads), and a meditation lesson for children (which turns into a ploy to get their dads' e-mail addresses). One sketch revealed that Pierre's ideal dreams include a "beautiful boy" and the boy's mustachioed dad inviting him to a barbecue dinner, where he is fed meat while looking at various websites on an extremely fast internet connection. While hosting the Channel 5 Dance Party, Pierre commented that he once impregnated Casey's mother.
- Chippy – an animated character whose origin dates back to Tom Goes to the Mayor, Chippy is a wild creature often seen in very brief bits in which he is found hiding in a background. Chippy resembles a hirsute baby, with a handlebar mustache and an abnormally large unibrow. Chippy is always in distress and a scene with Chippy almost always ends with it emitting a high-pitched screech. In the episode "Forest," Chippy's mother (Wareheim) viciously attacks Tim while on a nature hike.
- Jan and Wayne Skylar (Heidecker and Wareheim) – a husband and wife who are television news anchors, billed as "Channel 5's Only Married News Team", and less than modest about displaying affection on air. These characters were carried over from Tom Goes to the Mayor.
- Dr. Steve Brule (John C. Reilly) – an inept Channel 5 news reporter who often appears uncomfortable being on air, and seems uncontrollably attracted to his colleague Jan Skylar – whose husband Wayne disapproves of his advances toward her. Canadian comedian Ron Sparks played Brule in a short video for the charity event Other People's Stuff. in 2008. Brule also became the subject of a spin-off series, Check It Out! with Dr. Steve Brule.
- Steve Mahanahan (Wareheim) – the eccentric owner of a retailer that sells children dressed as clowns for the use of the buyer's amusement. In his commercials he is always shown with constant visual effects and video glitching. He also gave Casey Tatum a ride in the season 1 episode, 'Missing'. Steve Mahanahan also has a brother named Mike (played by Tim) who appeared in one episode and sells shoes for the aforementioned child clowns, and like his brother, is constantly featured in his commercials with video glitching. Often the two brothers profess their love for each other and their endorsement of their brother's store. In season 5, Steve Mahanahan was arrested for touching a child clown and Mike Mahanahan was shot in the face for no discernible reason. With these two gone, their father Donald Mahanahan (played by Will Ferrell) took over the business breeding child clowns. Donald Mahanahan breeds the clowns using his own seed and women who possess "real clown traits".
- Glen Tennis (A.D. Miles) – a film producer and actor, characterized by his short temper and a penchant against "crappy acting". He starred alongside Ron Stark in a low-budget sci-fi film, Crystal Shyps. In "Carol", Tennis is seen selling Crystal Shyps merchandise on Shopping Indoors, but is interrupted by his brother David—who calls in to "harmlessly rib" him, prompting Tennis to destroy the merchandise in anger. In "Tennis", Tennis is seen promoting his new film The Pillgrums, with the film's badly rendered CGI co-star, Grum.
- Spagett (Heidecker) – a hyperactive overweight middle-aged man with a black ponytail, visible hair plugs, and dried spaghetti sauce around his lips. He is the host of a hidden camera TV show, where he hides in various locations to "spook" people by yelling out his name. However, his hiding places are always in plain view and as a result, his victims are rarely frightened. In one episode Tim stars as Spagett in the Steven Spielberg (portrayed by look-alike Howie Slater) movie Spagett and the Quest for the Golden Treasure. He also serves as a spokesman for Cigarette Juice.
- The Beaver Boys (Heidecker and Wareheim) – a pair of party boys named Dilly and Krunk who often prowl the beach for women. They are seen as having a penchant for cocktail shrimp and white wine, which is further emphasized in the lyrics to their show's accompanying theme song.
- Carol and Mr. Henderson (Wareheim and Heidecker) – set in a typical office, Carol is an obese lady who has a sexual obsession with Mr. Henderson, her balding and bespectacled boss. Henderson often stops by Carol's cubicle to sexually harass/tease her. This always excites Carol, and just when she is most excited, Mr. Henderson throws his coffee in her face. Henderson secretly adores Carol, but won't show it. In The Tim and Eric Chrimbus Special, Carol and Henderson are shown to have married. Henderson, while playing with his guillotine collection, is nearly beheaded by Carol. However, thanks to a speedy trip to the hospital, Henderson is rehabilitated by Gary, twin brother of office employee Larry. A deleted scene from the Chrimbus Special DVD reveals that Henderson's first name is Dick.
- Ron Stark – a self-proclaimed actor, director, and producer, who often has various roles throughout every Tim and Eric season. In season 1, such roles included a user of "Balls Insurance". He also hosts a show called Stark On Stark in season 2, in which he interviews himself.
- Will Grello (Will Forte) – host of several shows featuring activities such as fort building and quilting. Although his shows start out calmly and innocently, he inevitably unravels, as repressed thoughts surface about his abusive father who would punish him with a whipping belt and make him do disturbing things such as "cook the dog" and preserve his bowel movements in the toilet for his father's inspection. He frequently urinates involuntarily when he gets on his tangents about his father.

== Recurring sketches ==
- Cinco: Carried over from Tom Goes to the Mayor, Cinco is a family-owned megacorporation with various subsidiaries, including the Cinco Chemicals and Toy Division, among others. Most sketches involving Cinco take the form of commercials for its products and services—often of questionable appeal or based on outdated technology—such as the Cinco-Fone (a mobile phone that has a single button for "easier" operation, and multiple antennas, but cannot receive calls, only has enough battery life for one call, and is prone to overheating), insurance plans for groin injuries, "MyEggs" (a drug that causes "feces-activated" chicken embryos to become eggs that are "laid" in the toilet), as well as several body modifications – all of which promoted by the two middle-aged characters Rudy and Kent (Jay Mawhinney and Bob Ross) – that require the user's teeth be removed for safety regardless of the product.
- Channel 5 Kid Break: A series of pseudo-educational interstitial music videos, in which two "children" (Heidecker and Wareheim) rap about personal hygiene and family situations such as sitting down on the toilet while urinating, wearing a father's dirty socks, incest (having a crush on one's sister), not wiping one's rear end, bloody nipples, and eating one's boogers because of food insecurity.
- Brule's Rules: A Channel 5 interstitial where Steve Brule provides "advice" on various topics, "for your health".
- Uncle Muscle's Hour: A variety show on Channel 5 hosted by the titular Uncle Muscles ("Weird Al" Yankovic), almost always featuring performances by Casey and His Brother. One episode featured a talent show known as the "Uncle Muscle's Grand Championship"—which was won by Michael Q. Schmidt and his nude "Raise my Roof" dance routine.
- Afternoon Review: The Daytime Show for Women: Purportedly a daytime talk show, it instead features surreal performances by various men, with the show eventually cutting back to the title card with little explanation of what had just happened. Season 5 featured a variation, Morning Meditations, which follows a similar format.
- Child Showcase: A poorly-archived Channel 5 program on which "children" (an adult's head, including those of Rainn Wilson and Patton Oswalt, superimposed over a child's body) perform musical numbers that are somewhat inappropriate in subject matter, much to the chagrin of the host.
- Video Match: A Dating Service: A series of dating service videos featuring undesirable men looking for love. Such men, who are shown with compressed faces and prominent moustaches, include one with petite, feminine feet and another who is a gamer with only a "tip" for a penis (Rainn Wilson).
- Song Legends Karaoke: Karaoke videos featuring songs about subjects such as adultery, stalking, and living in an apartment with one's father. An elderly woman named Ruth Carr is featured prominently in two of the segments.

Occasionally a sketch will end with a freeze frame; the colors fade to black and white, and a voice announces, "Great job!" while these words are written over the frame.

== Death of Richard Dunn ==
On Friday June 4, 2010, character actor Richard Dunn died at age 73. Dunn's agent stated that Dunn had been at a Hollywood hospital, unconscious since the previous Sunday. Dunn was laid to rest at Hollywood Forever Cemetery.

On June 12, 2010, a special tribute bump for Dunn was aired on Adult Swim after the 12:30 a.m. showing of The Oblongs, describing Dunn as an irreplaceable part of the Tim and Eric family and saying how much he'll be missed, not just as a great character actor, but as a great friend as well.
