= Crunk (disambiguation) =

Crunk / Krunk is a style of hip hop music originating in the southern United States.

Crunk may also refer to:

- Crunk, a portmanteau of "crazy drunk", deriving from the alcoholic drink
- Crunk Energy Drink, a brand of non-alcoholic energy drink, and Crunk Juice, a later version of the drink with alcohol, based on the "crunk juice" cocktail suggested by the Lil Jon album of the same name
- "Crunk", being under the influence of both cannabis and alcohol
- "The Crunk", a character in the 1943 film Mr. Lucky

== Music ==
- Crunk&B, a hybrid music genre
- Crunk rock, a hybrid music genre
- Crunk Juice, an album by Lil Jon & the East Side Boyz
- "Crunk Muzik", a song by rapper Jim Jones
- Gangsta Crunk, an album by rapper Daz Dillinger

== See also ==
- Krunk (disambiguation)
- Kronk (disambiguation)
