= Kronk =

Kronk may refer to:

- Gary W. Kronk (born 1956), American amateur astronomer and writer
  - 48300 Kronk, an asteroid named after Gary Kronk
- Paul Kronk (born 1965), Australian retired tennis player
- KRONK Gym, a professional boxing gym in Detroit
- Kronk Pepikrankenitz, a character in the animated film The Emperor's New Groove (2000) and the eponymous characer of its sequel, Kronk's New Groove (2005)

== See also ==
- Krunk (disambiguation)
- Crunk (disambiguation)
