= Jake Najor =

American musician and drummer

Jake Najor is a drummer who has played on a Grammy Award winning album and has recorded and/or performed with Big Daddy Kane, Empire of the Sun, TV On the Radio, Kelis, Redman, Jason Mraz, the Beatnuts, Mindi Abair, Karl Denson, Weapon of Choice, Bad Credit, Raphael Saadiq, Robert Walter, Incredible Moses Leroy, Breakestra, Connie Price and the Keystones, Joss Stone, Soul of John Black, De La Soul, AJ Croce, Aloe Blacc and more.

He is the brother of Zak Najor, a founding member of The Greyboy Allstars.

Jake Najor currently plays with his own San Diego Music Award-nominated project Jake Najor and the Moment of Truth in addition to being a drummer in The Redwoods.
