= The Aquabats! Super Show! Television Soundtrack: Volume One =

Soundtrack album by The Aquabats
- Released: March 19, 2019 (Kickstarter advance); June 7, 2019
- Genre: Rock, pop rock, soundtrack
- Length: 47:59
- Label: Gloopy
- Producer: Cameron Webb

The Aquabats chronology
Hi-Five Soup! (2011)	The Aquabats! Super Show! Television Soundtrack: Volume One (2019)	The Fury Of The Aquabats! Live At The Fonda! (2020)

Singles from The Aquabats! Super Show! Television Soundtrack: Volume One
- 1. "Cobraman Theme! / Burger Rain!" Released: April 26, 2019; 2. "Feel My Steel!" Released: May 15, 2019

The Aquabats! Super Show! Television Soundtrack: Volume One is a soundtrack album for the first season of the American television series The Aquabats! Super Show!, consisting primarily of songs performed by the series' eponymous rock band, The Aquabats.

First released digitally for backers of the band's successful 2018 Kickstarter campaign alongside the live album The Fury of The Aquabats! Live at The Fonda! in March 2019, The Aquabats! Super Show! Television Soundtrack: Volume One was released independently on June 7, 2019, where it debuted at 165 on the Billboard 200 and topped the magazine's Top Heatseekers chart.

== Production history and release ==
The first season of The Aquabats! Super Show! premiered on March 3, 2012 on the American family-oriented cable channel The Hub. The series, which revolves around the comic exploits of a fictionalized version of the real-life California rock band, typically featured one to two original songs per episode performed by The Aquabats or their individual member(s), though much of Super Show!'s music was written by series composer Matt Gorney and/or series music supervisor Warren Fitzgerald in collaboration with the members of the band.

While the songs performed on the show were shortened to around a minute to account for each episode's brief 22-minute runtime, each were written and recorded as full-length songs with the intention of releasing a soundtrack album as well as for future live performances. Aquabats lead singer Christian Jacobs expressed plans to release the series' full-length songs on a soundtrack album shortly after the series premiere in 2012, though such plans ultimately never came to fruition within their expected timeframe; Jacobs nonetheless consistently confirmed eventual plans to release a soundtrack, even past the series' cancellation in 2014. It wasn't until July 2017, however, that The Aquabats would first release the full-length recordings of the season one songs "Burger Rain!" and "Beat Fishin'!" as a 7" single, initially as part of an exclusive tour package and later through their own merchandise retailers.

In late 2018, as The Aquabats were promoting their Bring Back The Aquabats! Kickstarter campaign which successfully met its $100,000 goal within minutes, enabling the band to independently produce and release new music and episodes of Super Show! among other things, Jacobs revealed that the season one soundtrack would be one of the first projects to be realized, that the album had been recorded for years but the band "hadn't had all the rights tied up until now".

On March 19, 2019, digital copies of The Aquabats! Super Show! Television Soundtrack: Volume One and The Fury of The Aquabats! Live at The Fonda! were e-mailed to backers of the campaign. Preceded by the release of "Cobraman Theme!" and "Burger Rain!" as a digital single on April 26, the soundtrack was given a national release on CD and vinyl through The Aquabats' self-operated label Gloopy Records on June 7, 2019.

== Track listing ==
No.	Title	Writer(s)	Featured performer(s)/lead vocalist(s)	Length
1.	"Super Show Theme Song!"	Warren Fitzgerald, The Aquabats	The Aquabats (MC Bat Commander)	1:02
2.	"Doing Science!" (from "Night of the Cactus!")	Chad Larson, Ian Fowles, Christian Jacobs	The Aquabats (Jimmy the Robot, EagleBones FalconHawk, Ricky Fitness)	2:50
3.	"Cobraman Theme!" (from "Cobraman!")	Cameron Webb, C. Jacobs, Matt Gorney, Richard Falomir	Matt Gorney	2:47
4.	"Showtime!" (from "Showtime!")	R. Falomir, C. Jacobs	The Aquabats (MC Bat Commander)	2:22
5.	"Feel My Steel!" (from "Floating Eye of Death!")	C. Jacobs, R. Falomir, Matt Chapman	The Aquabats (MC Bat Commander)	3:12
6.	"Cowboy Android Theme!" (from "Cowboy Android!")	M. Gorney, Jason Devilliers	Archie Thompson	2:49
7.	"ManAnt! Fight!" (from "ManAnt!")	W. Fitzgerald, The Aquabats	Instrumental	2:19
8.	"Burger Rain!" (from "ManAnt!")	M. Gorney, C. Jacobs	The Aquabats (MC Bat Commander)	3:29
9.	"Beat Fishin'!" (from "Ladyfingers!")	M. Gorney, C. Jacobs	Matt Gorney, Gina Matthews	3:37
10.	"Space Bees!" (from "Mysterious Egg!")	M. Gorney	Matt Basson	0:28
11.	"Guy Stuff!" (from "Laundry Day!")	M. Gorney	Matt Gorney	0:41
12.	"The Aquabats! Will Be Right Back!"	The Aquabats	The Aquabats	0:06
13.	"Tiny Burgers!" (from "Ladyfingers!")	M. Gorney		0:08
14.	"And Now...!"	The Aquabats	The Aquabats	0:06
15.	"We Got This!" (from "Uberchaun!")	Ian Fowles, C. Jacobs	The Aquabats (MC Bat Commander)	1:52
16.	"I Summon the Dude Theme!"	R. Falomir, James Briggs	Eagle "Bones" Falconhawk	1:22
17.	"Personal Property!" (from "Haunted Battletram!")	M. Gorney	Matt Chapman	0:35
18.	"Don't Break My Heart!" (from "Night of the Cactus!")	R. Falomir, C. Webb, C. Jacobs	Jimmy the Robot	2:04
19.	"The Good Life!" (from "Laundry Day!")	W. Fitzgerald	The Aquabats (MC Bat Commander)	1:33
20.	"Bye Bye, (The World Pass Us By)!" (from "Pilgrim Boy!")	M. Gorney	Tanner Glazier	1:23
21.	"Summertime!" (from "Uberchaun!")	M. Gorney	Matt Gorney	1:19
22.	"Baby Baby!" (from "Mysterious Egg!")	M. Gorney, R. Falomir, M. Chapman	Ricky Fitness, Matt Chapman, Matt Gorney	2:38
23.	"B.R.O.!" (from "EagleClaw!")	M. Gorney	Matt Basson	2:18
24.	"Robot Dreams!" (from "Mysterious Egg!")	W. Fitzgerald	Jimmy the Robot	1:52
25.	"Lady in the Corner!" (from "Ladyfingers!")	C. Larson	Ricky Fitness	1:55
26.	"Winging It!" (from "Cowboy Android!")	W. Fitzgerald, The Aquabats	The Aquabats (MC Bat Commander)	1:22
27.	"We Don't Stop!" (from "ManAnt!")	R. Falomir, C. Jacobs	The Aquabats (MC Bat Commander)	1:50

== Personnel ==
The Aquabats

- MC Bat Commander (Christian Jacobs) - lead and backing vocals
- Crash McLarson (Chad Larson) - bass guitar, vocals
- Jimmy the Robot (James Briggs) - keyboards, vocals
- Ricky Fitness (Richard Falomir) - drums, vocals
- EagleBones FalconHawk (Ian Fowles) - guitar, vocals

Production

- Produced and mixed by Cameron Webb
- Engineered by Matthew Gorney, Cameron Webb, Richard Falomir and Ian Fowles
- Recorded at Maple Studios in Santa Ana, California ("...for the most part")
- Design and layout by Parker Jacobs
- Photography by Joel Fox and Ben Clark

== Charts ==
Chart (2019)	Peak position
US Billboard 200	165
US Heatseekers Albums (Billboard)	1
US Independent Albums (Billboard)	3
US Soundtrack Albums (Billboard)	10
US Top Alternative Albums (Billboard)	13
US Top Rock Albums (Billboard)	32
