= Alexey Gogua =

Abkhazian writer (1932–2025)

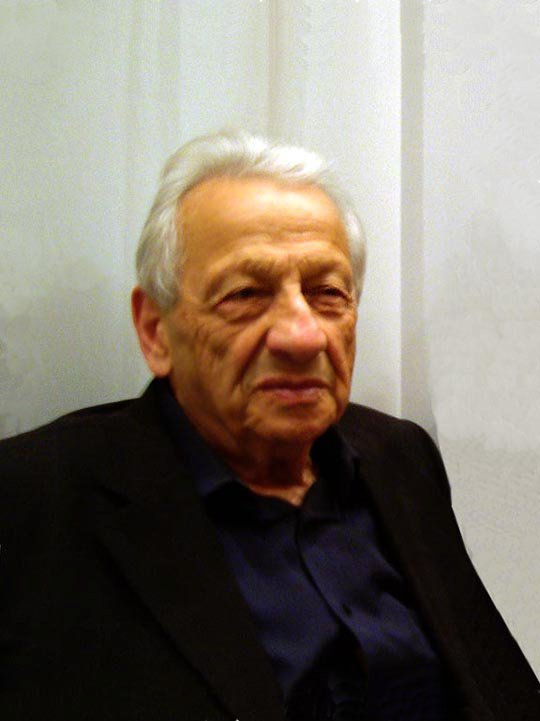
- Gogua in 2011
- Born: 15 March 1932; Gupi, Abkhaz ASSR, Georgian SSR, Transcaucasian SFSR, USSR
- Died: 7 May 2025 (aged 93)
- Education: Sukhumi Pedagogical University; Maxim Gorky Literature Institute
- Occupation: Writer

Alexey Nochevich Gogua (Abkhaz: Алықьса Ноча-иҧа Гәагәуа; 15 March 1932 – 7 May 2025) was an Abkhaz writer. He studied at the Sukhumi Pedagogical University and Maxim Gorky Literature Institute in Moscow. He was the first chairman of the organization Aidgylara. Gogua actively took part in the republic's political life and was a deputy of the Supreme Soviet of the USSR. His works are often considered to constitute the best prose in Abkhaz language. His works have been translated into many former USSR languages and English, German, Spanish, Hungarian, Polish and Bulgarian.

Gogua died on 7 May 2025, at the age of 93.
