= Radio Down! =

EP by The Aquabats
- Released: November 9, 2010
- Recorded: 2010 at Maple Studios, Orange County, California
- Genre: New wave, synthpop, pop rock
- Length: 10:22
- Label: Fearless
- Producer: The Aquabats, Cameron Webb, Warren Fitzgerald

The Aquabats chronology
Charge!! (2005)	Radio Down! (2010)	Hi-Five Soup! (2011)

Radio Down! is an EP single by American band The Aquabats, released on November 9, 2010.

== Overview ==
In early 2010 The Aquabats announced plans to release Hi-Five Soup!, their next studio album, by the end of the year, eventually confirming a tentative release date of November 9. After recording the album independently, the band signed a last-minute deal with Fearless Records, who agreed to distribute the album but suggested the release date be pushed to January 2011 to allow for proper marketing and promotion. Instead, an EP featuring the first single from the album and two non-album B-sides would be released in its place.

Radio Down! was issued primarily through digital download, though a limited run of 2000 CDs printed with DayGlo ink was made available shortly afterwards and sold at the band's concerts and through their website.

== Reception ==
Critical reception to Radio Down! was positive. Alternative Press described the EP's songs as "infectious" and "danceable", while The Marshalltown Chronicle summarized it as "fun synthpop from right start to finish". Sputnikmusic, though criticizing the EP's "overproduced and artificial" sound, awarded it a 3 out of 5 star rating, noting "Radio Down! is everything you’d expect from the Aquabats: catchy and smile-inducingly charming".

Upon release, Radio Down! debuted at number 10 on the Billboard Hot Singles Sales, a chart which measures sales of physical commercial singles.

== Track listing ==
1. "Radio Down!" (featuring Biz Markie) – 3:31
2. "Best Day Of My Life!" – 3:14
3. "Playin' It Cool!" – 3:36

== Personnel ==
=== The Aquabats ===
- The MC Bat Commander – vocals
- Crash McLarson – bass, backing vocals
- Eagle "Bones" Falconhawk – guitar, backing vocals
- Jimmy The Robot – keyboards, backing vocals
- Ricky Fitness – drums, percussion, backing vocals

=== Additional musicians ===
- Biz Markie – rapping on track 1
- Chainsaw, The Prince of Karate – additional guitars
