= Bad Credit =

Hip hop duo

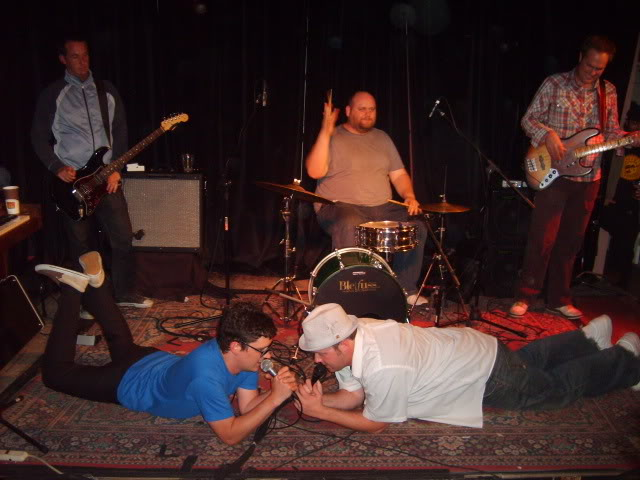
- Bad Credit performing in San Diego in March 2008.

Background information
- Origin: San Diego, California
- Genres: Comedy hip hop, hip hop, rap rock, nerdcore
- Years active: 2002–2008
- Past members: Optimus Rime; Dr. Cliff Mixtable

Bad Credit was an American comedy hip hop duo based out of San Diego, California which lasted from 2002 to 2008, fronted by musicians and comedians Matt Gorney (Optimus Rime) and Dallas McLaughlin (Dr. Cliff Mixtable).

Self-described as "financial hip hop", Bad Credit was a parody of the opulent "bling-bling" lifestyle portrayed by popular rap groups, subverting those themes into songs based on The Wall Street Journal articles and financial responsibility, exemplified by such titles as "Balance Your Checkbook". The group was also known for similarly themed stage antics, such as keeping a paper shredder onstage in which supposed unpaid bills would be shredded and thrown about as confetti.

== Overview ==
Bad Credit was spontaneously conceived one night by friends Gorney and McLaughlin when the former thought up the song title "Bill Gates Owes Me Five Bucks" and, both playing off the idea, developed the foundations of Bad Credit's gimmickry. Bad Credit first performed as part of an open mic night at the Blarney Stone Pub in Clairemont, San Diego, where they proved popular enough to be invited back for regular weekly gigs and eventually attracted the attention of Fluf frontman Otis "O" Barthoulameu, who solidified the band's line-up and booking schedule.

While Gorney and McLaughlin remained Bad Credit's two constant frontmen, the group performed with a rotating backing band of guitar, bass and drums (including Jake Najor), at various points featuring members of such local San Diego bands as Reeve Oliver and The Incredible Moses Leroy, all performing under humorous stage names including Methodist Man, EZ E-Literate, Q-Pon, Dolla Bill, Mr. Mapoji and Foot, among others.

With the San Diego City Beat describing them as "the most charming white-guy hip-hop you'll ever encounter", Bad Credit became a moderate success in the San Diego music scene, earning a nomination for "Best Hip-Hop" at the 2003 San Diego Music Awards and appearing several times on the XETV-TDT musical showcase Fox Rox. During the mid-2000s, Bad Credit struck up a lucrative touring partnership with the Orange County comedy rock band The Aquabats, performing at many of their Southern Californian concerts. Bad Credit's music was also regularly featured alongside The Aquabats on the sketch comedy program Mega64.

Following Bad Credit's disbandment in 2008, Gorney and McLaughlin were both involved as writers on Yo Gabba Gabba!, a children's television series created and produced by The Aquabats' Christian Jacobs and Scott Schultz, and later worked as writers and on-screen performers for Jacobs' and Schultz's The Aquabats! Super Show!, where Gorney also contributed significantly to the series' composing and original songs, most of which were compiled on The Aquabats! Super Show! Television Soundtrack: Volume One, several of which feature lead vocals from Gorney.

Outside of their own collaborative efforts, McLaughlin has pursued a career in comedy writing and stand-up comedy, while Gorney has pursued a musical career. In 2014, Gorney joined former My Chemical Romance singer Gerard Way's solo band as a bass guitarist, recording on his debut album Hesitant Alien. In the fall of 2019, Gorney briefly toured as a substitute bassist for The Aquabats, filling in for founding bassist Crash McLarson as his fictional cousin "Smash McLarson", and made a vocal cameo credited as Optimus Rime on their 2019 single "Skeleton Inside!", which later appeared on the band's 2020 album Kooky Spooky...In Stereo, which featured four songs co-credited to Gorney.

In the Summer of 2019 Bad Credit announced that they would be reuniting for a few shows and to release a live album that also features never before heard music.

== Discography ==
Albums

- Financial Hip Hop Inc. EP (2003)
- Giving Back by Giving Up (2004)

Music videos

- "B-A-D C-R-E-D-I-T"
- "So What!"
