= The Aquabats! Super Show! =

American television series

- Genre: Action/adventure; Sitcom; Musical
- Created by: Christian Jacobs; Jason deVilliers; Scott Schultz
- Starring: The Aquabats
- Narrated by: Mr. Lawrence
- Country of origin: United States
- No. of seasons: 2
- No. of episodes: 21 (+ pilot); 9 (The Aquabats! Saturday Morning!); 12 (The Aquabats! RadVentures!) (list of episodes)

Production
- Executive producers: Bob Higgins; Jon Berrett; Christian Jacobs; Scott Schultz
- Producers: Nate Rogers; Justin Lyon
- Running time: 22 minutes
- Production companies: The Magic Store Productions; FremantleMedia Enterprises; Wildbrain Entertainment

Original release
- Network: Hub Network
- Release: March 3, 2012 – January 18, 2014

The Aquabats! Super Show! is an American action-comedy musical television series which aired from March 3, 2012 to January 18, 2014 on The Hub Network, later resuming as an independent YouTube series from September 2019 to February 2025. The series was created by Christian Jacobs and Scott Schultz, both the creators of the Nick Jr. Channel series Yo Gabba Gabba!, and Jason deVilliers.

Based on the superhero mythology of The Aquabats, a real-life comedy rock band which series co-creator and lead singer Jacobs formed in 1994, The Aquabats! Super Show! follows the comic adventures of a fictionalized version of the band, a musical group of amateur superheroes, as they haphazardly defend the world from a variety of villains and monsters. Styled similarly to the campy aesthetics of 1960s and 1970s children's television and Japanese tokusatsu, Super Show! utilizes various mediums of visual styles and special effects, mixing live-action storylines with cartoon shorts, parody advertisements and musical interludes.

The series' first season concluded on June 16, 2012 following a run of 13 episodes, having met with a largely positive critical reception, consistently high ratings for the channel and a Daytime Emmy nomination for Outstanding Children's Series. The series' second season consisted of an initial five episodes which aired through June 2013, with three additional episodes airing in late December and January 2014, receiving similar acclaim and a further seven Daytime Emmy nominations, ultimately winning one for Best Stunt Coordination. In June 2014, co-creator Jacobs officially announced the series' cancellation, following news of The Hub's financial losses which led to the network's rebranding as Discovery Family later that October.

In July 2018, The Aquabats launched a successful Kickstarter to help independently finance new episodes of The Aquabats! Super Show!, promoting the campaign with a series of YouTube-exclusive mini-episodes continuing the original series' storyline. From September 2019 to February 2025, the band premiered 12 of these new episodes on YouTube, retitled as The Aquabats! RadVentures! though still retaining Super Show!'s theme song and title card.

== Series overview ==
=== Premise ===
Chronicled in both live-action and animated segments, The Aquabats! Super Show! is centered around the adventures of The Aquabats, a group of superhero rock musicians who travel the countryside on a self-appointed mission to fight evil and "destroy boredom", protecting the world from the villains and creatures who threaten to destroy it while aiming to become a famous rock and roll band in their own right.

If the person is over 30, I'd say it's like Batman meets The Monkees, with a little bit of Sid and Marty Krofft in it. If they're under 30, I'd say Power Rangers meets Flight of the Conchords, very sarcastic. If they're kids...superheroes fighting monsters. And at some point, something will explode.

— Christian Jacobs, on how he would describe The Aquabats! Super Show!.

The Aquabats consist of singer The MC Bat Commander (Christian Jacobs), the swaggering leader of the group; bassist Crash McLarson (Chad Larson), who can grow up to 100 feet in size; drummer Ricky Fitness (Richard Falomir), who has the power of super speed; guitarist EagleBones Falconhawk (Ian Fowles), who's armed with a laser-shooting electric guitar; and keyboardist Jimmy the Robot (James R. Briggs, Jr.), an android. Despite their superhuman strengths and abilities, The Aquabats are quite bumbling, disorganized, and sometimes cowardly when faced with danger; this has in fact led them to be labeled "the world's most inept superheroes". The band lives and travels by way of their "Battletram", a modified classic GMC motorhome which, despite its small exterior, has an implausibly massive interior (similar to the TARDIS from Doctor Who or The Big Bologna from The Kids From C.A.P.E.R.), which contains, among many things, a science lab, a command center, and a living room.

The Aquabats' origin story was left intentionally vague throughout the series, a choice Jacobs explains was done for the sake of the viewer's imagination, as he felt kids were more accepting of the inherent absurdity of the premise than adults tend to be: "'There's five guys. This is what each of the five guys does. There are monsters. They're gonna try to fight them'. It's so simple. And I think that's why it's so awesome with kids—they just take it and run with it". In the first five episodes of season two, each member of The Aquabats shares their memory of how they joined the band via animated flashback sequences; however, all of these flashbacks directly and intentionally contradict each other, leaving it unknown which—if any—could be considered officially canonical.

=== Format and influences ===
Many of the series' villains were carried over from The Aquabats' stage shows. Pictured above is "CobraMan", appearing as a villain at an Aquabats concert in 2008 (left) and on an episode of Super Show! in 2012 (right).

The Aquabats! Super Show! juxtaposes both live-action and animated segments starring The Aquabats, interwoven with various tangential skits and cartoon interstitials. The live-action storylines are the primary focus of each episode, following a self-contained villain of the week formula. In the first season, each episode featured brief anime-styled cartoon shorts which one of the characters would introduce at a random point of the show, often by finding "A Cartoon" (represented by a miniature television set) in an absurd location. Unlike the live-action segments, these cartoons followed a serialized story arc, with each installment ending in a cliffhanger to be resolved in the next episode. In season two, this format was replaced with a series of animated flashbacks recounting the origins of The Aquabats, each by a different animation studio and in a different animation style. Between these segments are pantomime cartoon shorts starring "Lil' Bat", The Aquabats' anthropomorphic bat mascot, and live-action parody commercials for outlandish fictional products, the latter of which has long been a staple of The Aquabats' multi-media stage shows.

Jacobs says the concept behind Super Show! was something he had always dreamed of doing, making a "campy, live-action, funky kid's show" in the vein of the 1960s and 1970s television that he and the rest of the series' producers had grown up with. While the show pays homage to many facets of pop culture, Jacobs has named the 1960s Batman television series as the primary influence on Super Show!'s "obviously silly" tone and visual style, ranging from set design to the trademark use of dutch angles for villain scenes. Other notable influences Jacobs has repeatedly mentioned include the works of Sid and Marty Krofft and Hanna-Barbera, Japanese tokusatsu series such as Ultraman and Johnny Sokko And His Flying Robot, the Shaw Brothers and Hong Kong cinema, and shows including Danger Island, Star Trek, The Rocky and Bullwinkle Show, and Pee-wee's Playhouse, noting "there's a good 30 years worth of television culture packed into these 22-minute episodes".

=== Demographic ===
As The Hub's key demographic were children aged 6 to 12, Super Show! was ostensibly targeted towards said age group, though Jacobs has stated that the series primarily aimed to appeal to an all-ages crowd, with the intent of creating entertainment that both kids and parents can watch and enjoy together or separately. In interviews prior to the series' premiere, he explained that this was merely an extension of The Aquabats' own family-friendly ethos: "There's just obviously something about the costumes and being superheroes that really appeals to younger kids, and I think we always knew that as a band...I think we'll want to put things in [the show] for an older audience, because we realize we have an older audience, but then also we want the young kids, to not have it go over their heads".

== Production history ==
=== History and previous attempts at a series ===
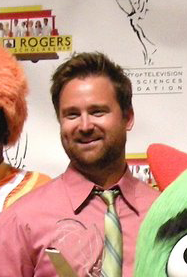
Christian Jacobs founded The Aquabats in 1994 and conceived the idea of a television series based on the band.

In 1994, musicians Christian Jacobs, Chad Larson and former member Boyd Terry formed The Aquabats in Brea, California. Influenced as much by cartoons and camp television as theatrical bands like Devo and Oingo Boingo, The Aquabats gained instant notoriety in the Orange County music scene for their eccentric persona in which they claimed to be a band of superheroes on a quest to save the world and their elaborate stage shows which regularly featured scripted fights with costumed villains alongside similar stunts and comedy sketches.

The Aquabats' second studio album, 1997's The Fury of The Aquabats!, proved to be a minor commercial breakthrough for the group, charting on the Billboard 200 and bringing them exposure through such venues as MTV, leading Jacobs – a former child actor with ties in the industry – to develop the concept of adapting the band's mythology for television. In 1998, Buena Vista Television helped produce a live-action mini-pilot directed by comedian Bobcat Goldthwait titled simply The Aquabats!, following the comic misadventures of the then-eight member band in an over-the-top camp style similar to Saturday morning cartoon shows. The pilot, which has yet to be made available for public viewing, failed to generate any network interest and was ultimately even disowned by the band themselves.

Undeterred, The Aquabats made an attempt at a second pilot the following year, using a music video budget granted by their record label Goldenvoice Records for their 1999 album The Aquabats vs. the Floating Eye of Death!. Independently directed and produced by Jacobs and his creative partner Scott Schultz, the result was a five-minute promo video entitled The Aquabats in Color!. In contrast to the wackier tone of the previous pilot, The Aquabats in Color! was a more action-oriented superhero series modeled after Japanese tokusatsu shows such as Kamen Rider. According to Jacobs, the Fox Family Channel reportedly expressed interest in the series and ordered production on a proper pilot episode, though following the channel's acquisition by Disney in 2001, the project was cancelled.

=== The Aquabats! Super Show! pilot (2008) ===
In 2005, Jacobs and Schultz formed the Orange County-based production company The Magic Store, focusing on creating family-oriented television entertainment. One of the company's independently produced pilots, the children's television series Yo Gabba Gabba!, was eventually picked up as a series by Viacom's Nick Jr. Channel, premiering in August 2007 and ultimately becoming an award-winning and critically acclaimed international success. In the wake of the series' popularity, Jacobs and Schultz persuaded Yo Gabba Gabba!'s joint production company Wild Brain to help produce a new pilot based around The Aquabats in conjuncture with The Magic Store.

Again creatively spearheaded by Jacobs and Schultz, The Aquabats' third pilot, titled The Aquabats! Super Show!, was shot on location throughout southern California in late 2007 and early 2008. Part of this filming took place at a free invitation-only concert for members of the band's official fan club at the El Rey Theatre in Los Angeles on January 12, 2008. While The Aquabats' previous pilots were short, live-action promotional videos, The Aquabats! Super Show! was a fully realized 22-minute episode featuring two separate storylines based on the adventures of The Aquabats, one live-action and one animated, and interspersed with parody commercials and live footage of the band. Speaking on the decision to structure the show in such a varied format, Jacobs said "[w]e did that for a strategic reason – some networks like cartoons more than other networks. We wanted to say, 'this could be both shows'."

Following a period of post-production, The Aquabats began widely self-promoting Super Show! in June 2008, redesigning their website to promote the pilot and releasing a teaser trailer and several exclusive clips through an official Super Show! YouTube channel. On July 25, 2008, the band screened the full pilot at a concert in San Diego held during the weekend of San Diego Comic-Con, while a segment of the episode was hosted on Boing Boing the same day. In 2009, Cartoon Network allegedly picked the series up for a run of 22 episodes, though following major staff changes within the company—which, according to Jacobs, included the termination of the executives who had green-lighted Super Show!—the project was again cancelled.

=== The Hub and season one ===
The Hub is not afraid...[t]hey're looking at new programming and doing things differently, from a different standpoint that a lot of networks are still scared or they aren't able to do. The Hub is fresh and new so they can take new ideas and new shows, things that are kind of funky, or things that other networks would say, 'The Aquabats? That's stupid! Those guys are old and fat!' Whereas The Hub goes, 'The Aquabats? Those guys are old and stupid and fat! Perfect!'"

— Christian Jacobs, on The Hub's acquisition of Super Show!.

After several more unsuccessful network pitches into the 2010s, The Aquabats! Super Show! was finally picked up as a series by family cable channel The Hub, a joint venture between Hasbro and Discovery which launched in 2010 as a replacement for Discovery Kids. The Hub formally announced the series in a press release on March 23, 2011, revealing Super Show! would be given a first season run of 13 episodes, produced in conjuncture with FremantleMedia. In promotion of the series, The Aquabats appeared as part of a panel at the 2011 San Diego Comic-Con where they discussed their initial plans for the show, while The Hub sponsored an Aquabats concert held at the nearby House of Blues during the same weekend.

Production on season one of Super Show! officially began in May 2011. The entirety of the first season was shot within and around The Aquabats' hometown of Orange County, California; according to the first season DVD audio commentary, episodes were shot on location in the cities of Irvine, Silverado, Yorba Linda, Huntington Beach and Fullerton, while a private sound stage in Santa Ana was used for interior shots of the Battletram. A public Aquabats concert held at The Glass House club in Pomona on November 5, 2011 was also filmed to provide live footage of the band which is featured in the series' opening credits montage and several individual episodes.

Much of Super Show!'s staff consist of friends and colleagues of The Aquabats who've previously worked with the band on various projects, ranging from members of Yo Gabba Gabba!'s production team to fellow musicians within the southern California music scene. Among the more notable examples include Dallas McLaughlin and Matthew Gorney, both members of the San Diego hip hop band Bad Credit, who prominently served as writers, composers and performers, Warren Fitzgerald, guitarist for The Vandals, who was hired as a writer and music director, internet sketch comedy group Mega64 were commissioned to produce original material, primarily the series' parody commercials, and Japanese artist Pey, who had designed much of The Aquabats' promotional art and merchandise during the 2000s, was hired to design the season's animated segments. Additionally, several industry professionals were brought in to help work on the show: Dani Michaeli, a staff writer on SpongeBob SquarePants, was hired as the series' story editor, while Matt Chapman, co-creator of the internet Flash cartoon Homestar Runner, acted as a writer, director and actor on several episodes. As none of the members besides Jacobs had any previous acting experience, comedian Matt Walsh of the Upright Citizens Brigade was brought in to help teach The Aquabats comedic acting and timing.

In further homage to the original Batman series, Super Show! features a variety of celebrity cameo appearances. The series' first season included appearances from actors Jon Heder, Lou Diamond Phillips and Samm Levine, comedians Rip Taylor, Paul Scheer and Paul Rust, and comedy musician "Weird Al" Yankovic, who appeared in two episodes as different characters. The first season also included several "Easter egg" cameos from original Aquabats members Corey "Chainsaw" Pollock and Boyd "Catboy" Terry, as well as from fellow musicians Warren Fitzgerald and Art Mitchell of the band Supernova.

Despite having been originally announced as part of The Hub's 2011 Fall line-up, production delays postponed Super Show!'s premiere to early 2012. The series' marketing campaign began in December 2011, with a later announcement of an official premiere date confirmed for March 3, 2012. Following a non-consecutive run of 13 episodes, the first-season finale aired on June 16, 2012.

=== Season two ===
On October 16, 2012, The Aquabats and The Hub confirmed production on new episodes of Super Show! through Facebook and Twitter, announcing a tentative debut date of Spring 2013. Principal photography on season two began on October 22 and wrapped on December 1. Unlike the first season, the majority of season two was shot in and around Salt Lake City, Utah, which Jacobs explained was considerably less expensive than shooting in California.

While no changes were made to Super Show's creative team, in December 2012 it was announced that season two would introduce the series' first guest director, musician and comic book writer Gerard Way, who co-directed and co-wrote the season finale "The AntiBats!" with Jacobs and deVilliers. Way's involvement with the series was heavily covered by the music press in the wake of the March 2013 break-up of their popular alternative rock band My Chemical Romance. Among the guest stars featured in season two were professional skateboarders Tony Hawk and Eric Koston, Devo frontman and Yo Gabba Gabba! cast member Mark Mothersbaugh, internet celebrity Leslie Hall, actor Martin Starr and My Chemical Romance bassist Mikey Way.

On December 2, 2012, deVilliers revealed on his Twitter account that the upcoming season would consist of only five new episodes, in what he called more "season 1.5" than a "season 2", though mentioned the possibility of more being made in the future. On May 1, 2013, it was announced through Entertainment Weekly that the series' second season would begin airing on June 1. After a run of only five episodes, the season concluded on June 29, 2013.

=== 2013–2014 specials ===
On August 22, 2013, series performer Chad Larson confirmed via Twitter that three additional episodes of Super Show! were being filmed near the end of the year, "and maybe more next". Principal photography on these episodes eventually began in Utah in early October. Throughout the month, The Aquabats posted numerous pictures of production on the new episodes on their Twitter and Instagram accounts, some of which revealed production code numbers of 301, 302 and 303, ostensibly indicating what would be a third season. Though these numbers were later verified by the Internet Movie Database, a November press release from The Hub explicitly referred to these three episodes as "specials".

The first of these specials, "Christmas with The Aquabats!", aired on December 21, featuring comedians Robert Smigel and Matt Walsh in guest roles. The second of these episodes, "The Shark Fighter!" (based on The Aquabats' song of the same name), featuring comedian Rhys Darby, aired the following week on December 28, while the final special "Kitty Litter!" aired on January 18, 2014. "Kitty Litter!" was helmed by another guest director, Munn Powell, best known for his work as cinematographer on the Jared and Jerusha Hess films Napoleon Dynamite and Gentlemen Broncos.

Following this short run of episodes, there was no confirmation by either The Hub or The Aquabats as to the production of any future episodes. In a December 2013 interview, Christian Jacobs acknowledged the network's unusually small order of episodes but didn't elaborate on any possible reasoning. In the same interview, he stated that the band had initially prepared for another order of 13 episodes, having written as many scripts for potential future episodes.

On May 1, 2014, the nominees for the 2014 Daytime Emmy Awards were announced, revealing that Super Show! had been nominated for five awards in four categories, including the award for Best Writing in a Children's Series for the episode "The AntiBats!". The awards ceremony was held on June 22, 2014, where the series ultimately won the award for Best Stunt Coordination for stuntman Skip Carlson.

=== Cancellation by The Hub and hiatus ===
In mid-2014, it was announced in entertainment press that Hasbro and Discovery had been in the process of rebranding The Hub following what they saw to be disappointing returns for the channel, changes which included the departure of CEO Margaret Loesch, who was instrumental in acquiring Super Show! as a series. In a Huffington Post feature about The Aquabats prior to the band's appearance at the 2014 San Diego Comic-Con, it was revealed that The Hub had opted not to renew Super Show! for a third season, effectively cancelling the series.

Jacobs admitted he was surprised by this turn of events, noting "Everything we heard was that the show has been a real Cinderella story for the Hub and that it was rating really well with viewers. We just assumed that we'd eventually go back into production or at least get picked up for Season 3", but ultimately concluded "it is what it is" in regard to the network's decision. Despite this, Jacobs remained optimistic about the series' future, saying "Given that we now live in a world where people are streaming TV shows directly onto their iPhones & computers, and given that companies like Netflix & Yahoo! are now picking up so much new content for their customers...I just find it hard to believe that The Aquabats! Super Show! is really over. I mean, we haven't even made any toys yet". He concluded by stating "It took us almost 15 years to get that TV series made. And even though we've got a bunch more concert dates lined up for the rest of this year, our first priority is to find a new home for The Aquabats! Super Show!".

On March 31, 2015, the nominees for the 42nd annual Daytime Emmy Awards were announced, with Super Show! earning nominations for Best SFX Mixer (Blaine Stewart) and Best Stunt Coordinator (Braxton McAllister).

On June 27, 2015, The Aquabats screened the entire first season of Super Show! before a sold-out crowd at the Frida Cinema in downtown Santa Ana, which was accompanied by a live performance by the band and Q&A sessions with The Aquabats and numerous members of the cast and crew. A similar presentation of the entire second season – including the three additional specials – took place at The Art Theater in Long Beach on December 16, 2017, coinciding with the release of the second season Blu-ray.

=== Bring Back The Aquabats! Kickstarter campaign ===
Following weeks of teasing a major announcement, The Aquabats launched a Kickstarter campaign on July 31, 2018 to help finance the return of The Aquabats! Super Show! as well as new studio albums from the band at a minimum projected cost of $1.1 million. The Aquabats promoted their campaign with a video featuring a slew of celebrity cameos, including Super Show! guest stars "Weird Al" Yankovic, Robert Smigel (as Triumph the Insult Comic Dog), Matt Chapman (as Homestar Runner and Strong Bad), former Aquabats member Travis Barker, Adrian Young, Tom Dumont, Oscar Nunez, Kate Micucci, Blake Anderson, Imagine Dragons, Felicia Day and Tom Lennon, all of whom appeared in The Aquabats' trademark uniforms and spoke the Kickstarter's promotional slogan "I am The Aquabats"/"We are The Aquabats". Most prominently featured, however, was comedian Jack Black, who was later confirmed by the campaign's press releases to act as executive producer for the series' return.

Along with their Kickstarter, the band began releasing a series of Super Show! "mini-episodes", depicting the MC Bat Commander's metafictional quest to reunite the estranged Aquabats following the series' cancellation. The band confirmed that as the Kickstarter progresses, further "mini-episodes" will be released to both promote the campaign as well as act as a continuation of Super Show!.

By August 28, mere days before the campaign's end date of September 1, The Aquabats' Kickstarter had raised only $601,629 of its projected $1.1 million goal. The funding was subsequently cancelled and the campaign was rebooted the same day with a smaller goal of $100,000 to instead finance one new album and the continued production of the Super Show!! "mini-episodes". The project's goal was met within minutes.

== Music ==
Original music for The Aquabats! Super Show! was primarily composed and performed by The Aquabats themselves, with additional scoring on most episodes provided by Matthew Gorney, Warren Fitzgerald or individual credits for Aquabats members James R. Briggs, Jr., Richard Falomir and Ian Fowles. Fitzgerald, guitarist for punk rock band The Vandals and former member of Oingo Boingo, acted as the series' music supervisor. The theme song to Super Show!, "Super Show Theme Song!", was co-written by The Aquabats and Fitzgerald.

Whereas most musically oriented shows like The Monkees typically break the narrative of an episode for a music video performance of a standalone song, each episode of Super Show! typically features one or two unique songs that tied directly into the plot, usually about and performed during the events of a particular scene. Most of these songs are rather brief, averaging a running time of just under a minute; Jacobs stated that many of the show's original songs were recorded as full-length pieces but trimmed down for inclusion in an episode, simply due to the show "trying to pack so much into 22 minutes".

Shortly after Super Show!'s premiere, Jacobs confirmed plans to eventually release the series' original full-length songs as a soundtrack album. However, these plans wouldn't fully come to fruition until 2019; in a 2018 interview, Jacobs retrospectively revealed that the album had been long completed but the band "hadn't had all the rights tied up" until then. The first original and full-length recordings from the series' first season debuted in July 2017, when "Burger Rain" and "Beat Fishin'" were released as a tour-exclusive 7" single. Songs from the series' first season were eventually compiled as The Aquabats! Super Show! Television Soundtrack: Volume One, which was released digitally in March 2019 and then onto physical media the following June, where it became The Aquabats' highest-charting album to date, debuting at the top of Billboard's Top Heatseekers chart and at 165 on the Billboard 200.

== Cast and characters ==
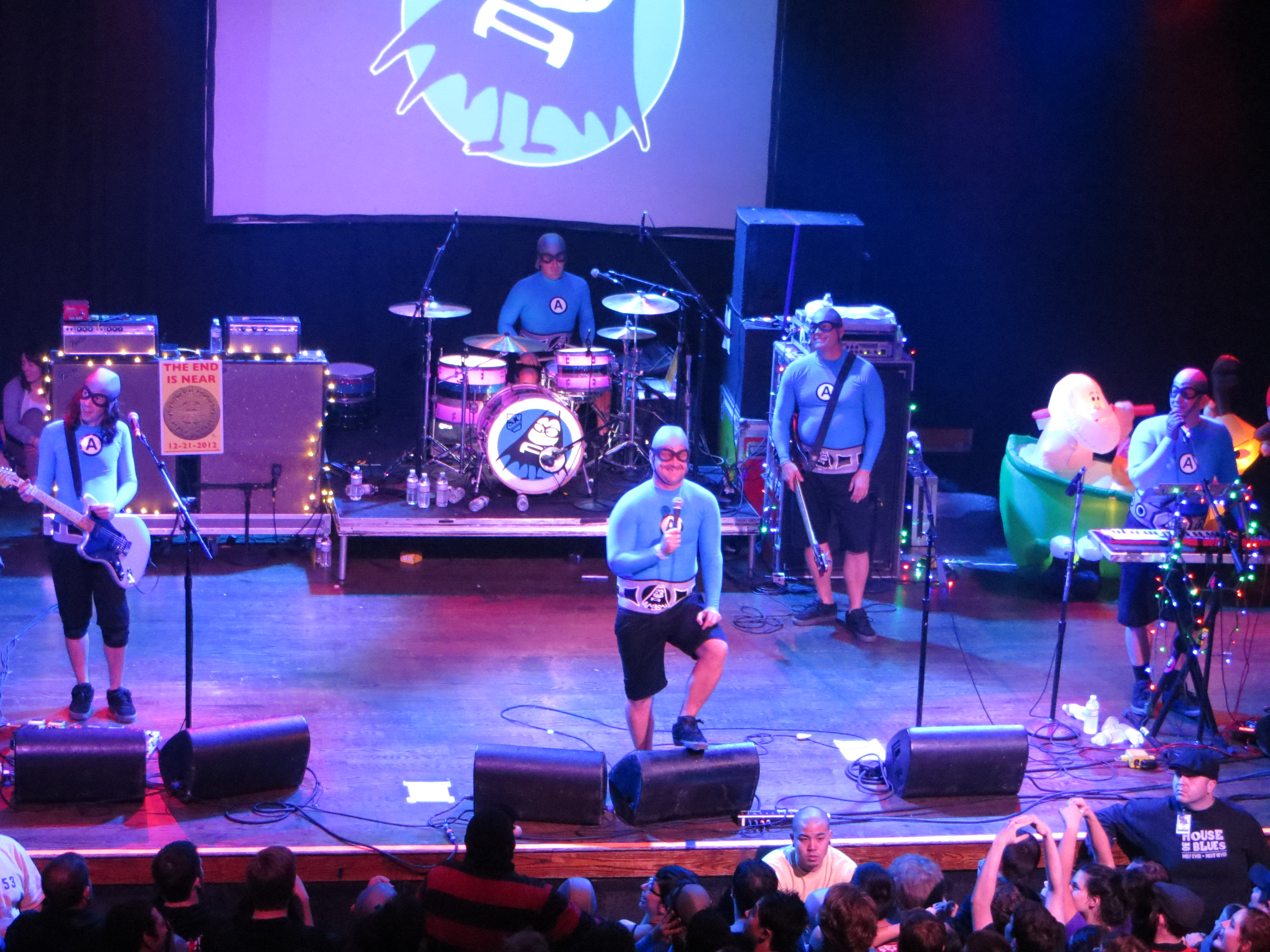
The Aquabats appear as their fictional stage characters in Super Show!.

The Aquabats! Super Show! stars and is based upon fictionalized versions of the then-current (since 2006) line-up of the California comedy rock band The Aquabats. Adapting the backstory the band has used for the entirety of their professional career, Super Show! depicts The Aquabats as a group of bumbling, out-of-shape superheroes on a self-appointed mission to fight the forces of evil, presented in both live-action and animated segments. The five members of The Aquabats are:

- The MC Bat Commander (played and voiced by Christian Jacobs) is the Aquabats' singer and de facto leader of the team. Though he doesn't have any superpowers of his own and is often quite stubborn and naive, the Commander is shown to be an effective strategist whose sharp leadership skills, bravery and determination regularly drive the band towards victory.
- Crash McLarson (played and voiced by Chad Larson) is the band's bass guitarist, who has the frequently uncontrollable ability to grow upwards of 100 feet in size when under emotional stress. Despite being the largest and strongest of The Aquabats, Crash has a gentle, childlike demeanor bordering on slight dim-wittedness, and as such is usually the most cowardly member of the team.
- Jimmy the Robot (played and voiced by James R. Briggs, Jr.) is the Aquabats' keyboardist. As his name implies, Jimmy is an android whose mechanical body houses a variety of built-in gadgets and weaponry, plus a comprehensive knowledge database which earns him the position of the group's resident scientist. Despite being a robot, Jimmy is generally perplexed by human emotions and behavior.
- Ricky Fitness (played and voiced by Richard Falomir) is the band's drummer, Ricky possesses the power of super speed. Despite being the most physically fit and health-conscious member of The Aquabats, some of the series' running gags revolve around Ricky's status as a handsome ladies' man and his fondness for "fresh, healthy veggies" in contrast to the rest of the team's voracious affinity for junk food.
- EagleBones Falconhawk (played and voiced by Ian Fowles) is the Aquabats' guitarist. The cocky and boyish maverick of the team, EagleBones is highly proficient on his custom weaponized electric guitar which shoots lasers from its headstock. Following a spiritual encounter early in season one, EagleBones also has the gift of second sight and is accompanied by "The Dude", an invisible spirit eagle whom he summons to aide The Aquabats in battle.

Voice actor and writer Mr. Lawrence provided the minimal narration for both seasons of Super Show!'s live-action segments, while staff writer Kyle McCulloch narrated the first season's animated segments.

=== Guest stars and recurring characters ===
Though each episode of the series introduced a new villain, ally and/or celebrity cameo, Super Show! never featured any major recurring characters throughout its run. However, every episode of the show included a very brief appearance by a character fans dubbed the "Fox Man", a man in a cheap-looking fox costume played by visual effects supervisor Joel Fox, who would appear hidden in the background of a random scene as an Easter egg for viewers to spot, although his character was never explained within the context of the series.

Comedy musician "Weird Al" Yankovic and comedian Paul Rust were the only two guest actors to appear in two episodes: Yankovic played two different roles as the President of the United States and superhero SuperMagic PowerMan! (in a 2012 interview, Jacobs alluded to the two possibly being the same character, though this isn't implied within the series), while Rust played a boorish slacker named Ronmark, first appearing in live-action in a first-season episode and subsequently lending his voice to a mutated monster version of the character in part of a second-season episode.

Matt Chapman of The Brothers Chaps plays the villain Carl in the episode "CobraMan!". Carl's voice and luchador styled mask are very similar to that of Strong Bad from the animated web series Homestar Runner Matt co-created with his brother, Mike Chapman. While it is never explicitly stated Strong Bad and Carl are the same person, Strong Bad has made a guest appearance in an Aquabats concert.

== Episodes ==
Season	Episodes	Originally released	
Season	Episodes	First released	Last released
Pilot		July 25, 2008	
1	13	March 3, 2012	June 16, 2012
2	8	June 1, 2013	January 18, 2014

== Distribution ==
=== International broadcast ===
Outside of North America, The Aquabats! Super Show! broadcast in Australia on the children's public broadcasting channel ABC3 and in the United Kingdom on the children's network CITV.

=== Home media ===
Coinciding with the run of the first season, each new episode of The Aquabats! Super Show! was released through the iTunes Store for digital download. Prior to the series debut, a season pass was made available for purchase to enable viewers to automatically receive a download of each new episode on its airdate. The first season of Super Show! was added to the video streaming service Netflix on December 1, 2012, later being added to Hulu on December 21.

Unlike the first season, the series' second season was not made available for iTunes pre-order, nor were episodes released for purchase. Though each episode was briefly streamed on The Hub's official website, none of the seasons' episodes were made available on Hulu, Netflix or similar streaming services.

Shout! Factory had the DVD publishing rights for The Aquabats! Super Show! within Region 1 for release of the first season. The company first announced their acquisition of the series and plans for a future DVD in a press release dated August 6, 2012, though did not initially confirm a set release date until several months later. On May 21, 2013, the first season of Super Show! was released on a two-disc DVD set.

On November 22, 2017, in conjunction with their announcement of a season two theatrical screening, The Aquabats confirmed an independent Blu-ray release for season two, including the three specials often considered a "season three". On December 5, pre-orders were launched on The Aquabats' merchandising site for an official release date of December 22, though copies were first made for public sale at the second season theatrical screening on December 16.

Starting in December 2014, The Aquabats gradually began uploading the series' full episodes onto their official YouTube channel. As of August 2019, all 21 episodes of Super Show! and its pilot episode have been publicly uploaded to their account.

DVD name	Episodes	Release date	Special features
The Aquabats! Super Show! Season One!	13	May 21, 2013 (NTSC)	The original series pilot; Aquabats commentary for the pilot and episodes "ManAnt!", "EagleClaw!", "Cowboy Android!", "CobraMan!" and "Showtime!"; Blooper reel; Behind the scenes featurettes
The Aquabats! Super Show! Season Two!	8 (including season three specials)	December 22, 2017 (NTSC)	Aquabats commentary for episodes "Return of The Aquabats!", "Summer Camp!", "The Thingy!", "The AntiBats!" and "Christmas with The Aquabats!"; Blooper reel; Deleted and alternate scenes

== Critical reception ==
Critical response to The Aquabats! Super Show! was predominantly positive, with most reviewers praising the series' intentionally campy tone and offbeat humor. The Onion's The A.V. Club gave the series premiere an A− rating, describing it as "a loving homage to basically everything ever done by the brothers Krofft": "the show adeptly flips from humor to melodrama to action, providing some awesomely cheap special effects, goofy songs, and gags that range from slapstick to sublime", summarizing "there's so much here that both kids and parents will be able to enjoy the proceedings on their own respective levels and rarely find themselves bored".

Brian Lowry of Variety wrote "you don't have to laugh at everything to admire the effort and sheer silliness", calling the show a "goofy and nostalgic" throwback to the "children's TV of baby boomers' youth, down to crappy production values and awful-looking 'monsters' that work to its advantage". He summarized "Although this Hub series at times feels like an SNL skit stretched to a half-hour, its sly mix of music, live-action crime-fighting, cartoons and mock ads ought to develop a cult following—and might be more popular with parents, at least those with the geek gene, than their kids".

Technology magazine Wired was consistently positive towards the series, calling it both "wonderfully strange" and "delightfully deranged", writing "[f]illed with self-deprecating music videos, toon interludes and ludicrous villains, The Aquabats! Super Show! has become one of television's strangely comforting finds".

Common Sense Media, who review shows based on age-appropriate content, gave Super Show! a rating of 4 out of 5 stars, calling it "demented and manic...fun by sheer dint of how many jokes, visual and otherwise, are thrown at the screen, both those calculated to appeal to kids and adults". The site praised the series for its lighter and sillier tone in comparison to more violent live-action superhero fare, and considered the "kind-hearted" Aquabats to be relatively positive role models. However, the reviewer suggested the show's violence and creatures may be too intense for very young children, and pointed out a distinct lack of central female characters.

Neil Genzlinger of The New York Times offered a more indifferent opinion, calling The Aquabats "indescribably odd" and the series "frenetic, semicoherent and generally harmless. Also somewhat hallucinogenic", noting Super Show!'s writing "may be over the heads of the 2-to-12 set", suggesting its most receptive audience might be "the college drinking-game crowd".

=== Awards and nominations ===
The Aquabats! Super Show! was nominated for the following awards:

Daytime Emmy Award

Year	Award	Result
2013	Outstanding Children's Series	Nominated
2014	Writing for a Children's Series (Episode: "The AntiBats!" – Jason deVilliers, Christian Jacobs and Gerard Way)	Nominated
2014	Achievement in Lighting Direction	Nominated
2014	Achievement in Sound Mixing – Live Action	Nominated
2014	Stunt Coordination (Skip Carlson)	Won
2014	Stunt Coordination (Braxton McAllister)	Nominated
2015	Sound Effects Mixing (Blaine Stewart)	Nominated
2015	Stunt Coordination (Braxton McAllister)	Nominated
