= Krunk (society) =

Krunk (Armenian: Կռունկ) was a cultural-charitable society in Abkhazia between Perestroika and 2004, headed by Albert Topolyan. It was the principal organisation representing Armenian interests in Sukhumi and eastern Abkhazia.

Krunk held its founding congress on 27 January 1990. On 21 February 1991, it became a founding member of the bloc of socio-political organisations Soyuz. On 15 April 2004, it merged with the Armenian Cultural Centre and the Mashtots to form the Armenian Community of Abkhazia.
