= Parody advertisement =

Short comedy scene imitative of marketing communication

Satirical advertisement on the topic of Australia Day, produced by The Juice Media.

A parody advertisement is a fictional advertisement for a non-existent product, either done within another advertisement for an actual product, or done simply as parody of advertisements—used either as a way of ridiculing or drawing negative attention towards a real advertisement or such an advertisement's subject, or as a comedic device, such as in a comedy skit or sketch.

== Overview ==
A parody advertisement should not be confused with a fictional brand name used in a program to avoid giving free advertising to an actual product, or to the use of a fictional brand name in an actual advertisement used for comparison, which is sometimes done as opposed to comparing the product to an actual competitor. (In some countries, Germany or Norway for example, it is illegal to make disparaging comments about a competitor's product in an advertisement, even if the statements are proven to be true.)

A parody advertisement can be one in which the advertisement appears to actually be a real ad for the false product, but then the advertisement is somehow exposed to be a parody and if it is an actual advertisement the actual brand becomes clear. If it is simply a parody it may or may not indicate that it is one.

== Notable examples ==
=== Candy ===
During the 1960s and 1970s, the Topps Chewing Gum Company released a product called Wacky Packages, in which stickers showing various products were shown in ridiculous scenes, such as

- Hawaiian Punch fruit drink, was parodied as "Hawaiian Punks. Beats you to a fruit-juicy pulp."
- Eveready Batteries, with its image of a cat having 9 lives, was parodied as "NeveReady Batteries, has 0 lives," and an image of a dead cat.

=== Film ===
- Tropic Thunder: In addition to Tropic Thunder's (in)famous fake movie trailers, the film has a parody ad for the fake products 'Booty Sweat' energy drink and 'Bust-A-Nut' candy bar. As part of the film's marketing 'Booty Sweat' has been made into a real life energy drink.
- Bamboozled: Spike Lee's satire has fake ads for 'Da Bomb' malt liquor and a racistly named parody of Tommy Hilfiger. In addition to the appearance in Bamboozled, 'Da Bomb' makes appearances in three other Spike Lee films, Clockers, Inside Man, and Sucker Free City.
- Grindhouse: The film Grindhouse has trailers for a number of fictional films. These include Machete, in which the FBI hires a mercenary rather than risk their own agents on a potential suicide mission; Werewolf Women of the SS about a group of women who run a Nazi death camp; Don't, an exploitative horror film; Thanksgiving, a slasher film in the genre of the Halloween series; and Hobo With a Shotgun about a vigilante killer similar to the premise of the film Death Wish. The trailer for Machete was so well received it has actually been made into a full-length feature film as well as Hobo with a Shotgun.
- RoboCop: Parody advertisements are seen throughout the RoboCop franchise for products such as the "6000 SUX", a parody of the low fuel economy of many American-made cars at that time, the game "NUKEM", a parody of Battleship, and "Magnavolt", a car security system designed to electrocute and kill would-be carjackers.
- UHF: The Weird Al Yankovic film UHF has a few fake ads within the film, such as "Spatula City", a store that sells nothing but spatulas, as well as promos for fake TV shows and movies like "Conan the Librarian" and "Gandhi II".
- Cяazy People: The 1990 film Cяazy People is about an advertising executive who work in a psychiatric hospital with a number of patients to create "truthful" advertisements, often over-the-top and with explicit language, for mostly real-life products and brands.
- The 2013 film Movie 43 featured a few parody ads such as "iBabe" spots, "Machine Kids" (a mock public service announcement), and a faux Tampax commercial.
- C.S.A.: The Confederate States of America: The 2004 mockumentary about the history of how the fictional Confederate States of America rose to power after winning the American Civil War is presented as a documentary airing on Confederate television. As such, the movie has commercial parodies that are racialist and are aimed towards white slave-owning families. Many of the products advertised in the film actually existed in the past.

=== Television ===
- The American sketch comedy series Saturday Night Live produces fictional commercials on a regular basis, usually shown after the guest host's monologue as an "introductory commercial", prior to the beginning of the main show. While many of these ads parody actual TV commercials, they are simple comedic parodies of the style of the real advertisement rather than its product.
- Likewise, many subsequent sketch comedy programs have utilized parody advertisements, including Robot Chicken, MADtv, In Living Color and The Idiot Box.
- Tim and Eric Awesome Show, Great Job! frequently featured surreal advertisements for products and services from an in-universe megacorporation known as Cinco. These commercials often advertised products of an outlandish, unappealing, or otherwise questionable nature, including badly-named toys such as the "B'owl" (a cross between a bat and owl) and "T'ird" (a cross between a bird and turtle), products based on outdated technology (such as the "Cinco-Fone" and "Cinco MIDI Organizer"), products related to urination and defecation, unusual body modifications (such as a "Food Tube", "Bro-oche", and "Eye Tanning System") that require the user's teeth be removed as part of installation, and a children's jukebox that generates hallucinatory "dance tones". Likewise, some sketches consisted of promos for equally-surreal programs on the in-universe television station Channel 5.
- Short Circuitz, an MTV sketch comedy show starring Nick Cannon, often featured parodies of popular advertisements. Its accompanying website, ShortCircuitz.mtv.com, allows users to upload their own parody advertisements to compete for a cash prize and a spot on the show.

==== Fictional advertisements for real products ====
- In the 1990s, the most famous series of parody advertisements were those for the Energizer battery. A parody itself of a Duracell battery commercial, in its initial commercial episode first shown in October 1989, a toy pink rabbit, is being filmed in a commercial. The toy, powered by the battery, escapes the studio and begins a rampage, pounding a drum and rolling through other commercials being made, including those for coffee, wine, a fictional upcoming TV series, long-distance service, breakfast cereal, and sinus medication. A total of 120 fictional commercials and 4 real ones (for Twinkies, Purina Cat Chow, Pepsi, and Duracell) in both English and Spanish involving the Energizer Bunny were made.
- In 1991, Eveready Battery Company sued the Adolph Coors Company over an ad for Coors beer it was producing, which showed actor Leslie Nielsen in a full-size rabbit suit pounding a drum, which was parodying Eveready's Energizer Bunny commercials, which themselves are parodies of Duracell advertisements and television program previews. Eveready claimed Coors' ad constituted copyright and trademark infringement. The court ruled that Coors' ad was a valid parody of Eveready's, considering that Mr. Nielsen "is not a toy, and does not run on batteries." Eveready Battery Co. v. Adolph Coors Co., 765 F. Supp. 440 (N.D. Ill. 1991).
- The GEICO insurance company ran a series of television commercials in which a victim in a disadvantaged situation hears their fate from the antagonist, that they have good news, only the good news is for the antagonist (The antagonist will usually say as the punchline, "I just saved a bunch of money on my car insurance by switching to GEICO"). Some examples involved a fictional congressional hearing where the witness (the victim) is being informed he is subject to criminal penalties while the chairman of the committee (the antagonist) has saved money on his car insurance, a home repair show reminiscent of Bob Vila showing a victim couple with a home badly in need of repair, a fictional news report on a volcanic eruption, and a fictional hair restoration commercial. Another example parodied advertisements for reality TV shows, by showing a couple getting married, and getting disgruntled at living in a tiny house (the punchline: a voiceover saying "The drama may be real, but it won't save you any money on car insurance", followed by the wife asking her spouse in their tiny hot tub "Why haven't you called GEICO?").
- The Coca-Cola company's lemon-lime soft drink Sprite ran a series of ads for other fictional drink products, which had actual or fictional celebrities endorsing the other product, with the implication that the fictional product was inadequate for quenching one's thirst.
- The gimmick of characters from a commercial invading other spoof ads was first used by the British Lager brewers Carling Black Label. The advert featured a wild west outlaw being roped by a posse and dragging them off their horses and into adverts for a love compilation Album and Washing up powder.
- The 2005 "Poser Mobile Posse" in a print, online and point-of-sale campaign created by Publicis Seattle for T-Mobile's pay-as-you-go cell phone plan was an ethnically diverse group of hip-hop posers with racially stereotyped Latino, Asian, and white characters like "Big Spenda Lopez", "The Fee Jones", "25 cent Chang" who inauthentically appropriate Black culture, and in one video ad arrive in a stereotypical rice burner faux sports car. The group ambush cell phone customers demanding hidden cell phone service charges and fees, but are rebuffed and called "posers" or "clowns". It is somewhat of a parody on Boost Mobile's "Where You At?" advertising campaign which features prominent hip-hop artists such as Ludacris, Kanye West, and The Game.

=== Magazines and print ===
==== Mad Magazine ====
Mad Magazine was notorious for regularly running obviously fictional ads for nonexistent products. However, many of these nonexistent products were clearly intended to be parodies of specific well-known brands of real-world products; frequently, the fictional advertisement in Mad parodied a specific genuine ad campaign for a recognizable brand-name product. For example, in the 1960s (when cigarettes could still be advertised on television), Kent Cigarettes ran a commercial featuring a series of line drawings illustrating the lyrics of a catchy jingle titled "The Taste of Kent". Mad promptly ran a fake print ad, using drawings which parodied the style of the line art, illustrating verses about lung cancer and emphysema to a lyric that parodied Kent's jingle, now titled "The Taste of Death".

According to Frank Jacobs's biography The Mad World of William M. Gaines, Mad's parodies of real advertisements generated so much attention that Mad publisher William Gaines received requests from the promotional departments of many real products, asking Mad to run parodies of their advertisements. Gaines's standard reply to such requests: "Come up with a really stupid ad campaign, and we'll be happy to make fun of it."

==== Hustler ====
The most serious incident involving a fictional advertisement in a magazine caused a lawsuit which reached all the way to the U.S. Supreme Court, when Hustler Magazine ran a parody of a liquor ad which would ask people about their "first time." In the actual ad, what we are led to believe is that the person is being asked about their first sexual experience, when it turns out the question is about their first time they used the sponsor's product, a liqueur.

In the parody advertisement in Hustler, the Reverend Jerry Falwell, at the time a prominent promoter of social conservatism and opponent of pornography, is supposedly quoted describing the first time he had sexual intercourse with his mother in an outhouse while intoxicated. Falwell sued Hustler Magazine and its publisher Larry Flynt for invasion of privacy, libel and emotional distress. The jury found for the magazine on the issue of libel (the fictional advertisement clearly indicated it was a parody), but awarded Mr. Falwell $350,000 in damages for the emotional distress and invasion of privacy claims. The Supreme Court ruled that, since the advertisement was so obviously a parody that no reasonable person could have believed it, Falwell was not libelled and thus is not entitled to damages for emotional distress, and he was not entitled to damages for invasion of privacy because he is a well-known public figure. Hustler Magazine, Inc. et al. v. Jerry Falwell, 485 U.S. 46, (1988).

==== Other examples ====
- The Adbusters Media Foundation's magazine Adbusters features advertisement parodies that are intended as sharp commentary on the social implications of either the product or the advertising campaign involved (also known as "Culture jamming"). One example is a parody of the "Joe Camel" advertising campaign for Camel Cigarettes, with a pseudo Joe Camel in a hospital bed, his head bald and an intravenous drip bottle leading into his arm, with the legend "Joe Chemo" on the faux ad, implying that the many years of smoking cigarettes has left "Joe" with cancer and requiring chemotherapy treatment.
- The Wrigley Company created fictional print ads for Juicy Fruit, such as boy bands, an upcoming fictional movie poster, and a phony handheld game system.
- Games Magazine, a monthly publication featuring game- and puzzle-related material, through the 1980s carried a fake ad feature noted (without page number) in each issue's contents with the tagline, "Which of the pitches is full of hitches?" One featured item was an abacus simulator running on PCs made by the nonexistent Nat Soh Software Co. of Hong Kong . The challenge to readers was to scrutinize all of the ads to spot the fake.

=== Miscellaneous ===
- Superhero-themed rock band The Aquabats are notorious for styling their live shows after Saturday morning cartoons, including engaging in scripted onstage battles with costumed monsters and villains. Normally, when these villains crash the stage, the concert will "cut to commercial" and a video screen behind the band will project a pre-recorded advertisement for an outlandish (and obviously fake) toy or product before returning to the show. In 2012, The Aquabats produced their own television series, The Aquabats! Super Show!, which also regularly features such parody commercials.
- An edited ad for a fictional Girl of the Year character wearing a track suit, bob haircut and wielding a semi-automatic pistol while defiantly violating face mask guidelines mandated due to the COVID-19 pandemic as a personification of the "Karen" stereotype, provoked criticism from Mattel subsidiary American Girl who took umbrage to the use of their name and trade dress, stating that they were "disgusted" by a post from brand strategist Adam Padilla under the online persona "Adam the Creator", and "are working with the appropriate teams at American Girl to ensure this copyright violation is handled appropriately." Boing Boing however expressed doubts over the merits of American Girl's proposed legal action against the "Karen" parodies citing the Streisand effect, though it has also noted the debate on whether the satirical intent of the parody advertisement is protected by law.
- Italy's most listened radio show "Lo Zoo di 105" ran a parody ad featuring a fictional luxury watches' brand Orologi Fumagazzi: two young listeners registered the trademark overnight, launching a real watches' collection with hilarious names and descriptions the very same week.
