= Ian Fowles =

American musician, author, and actor (b. 1979)

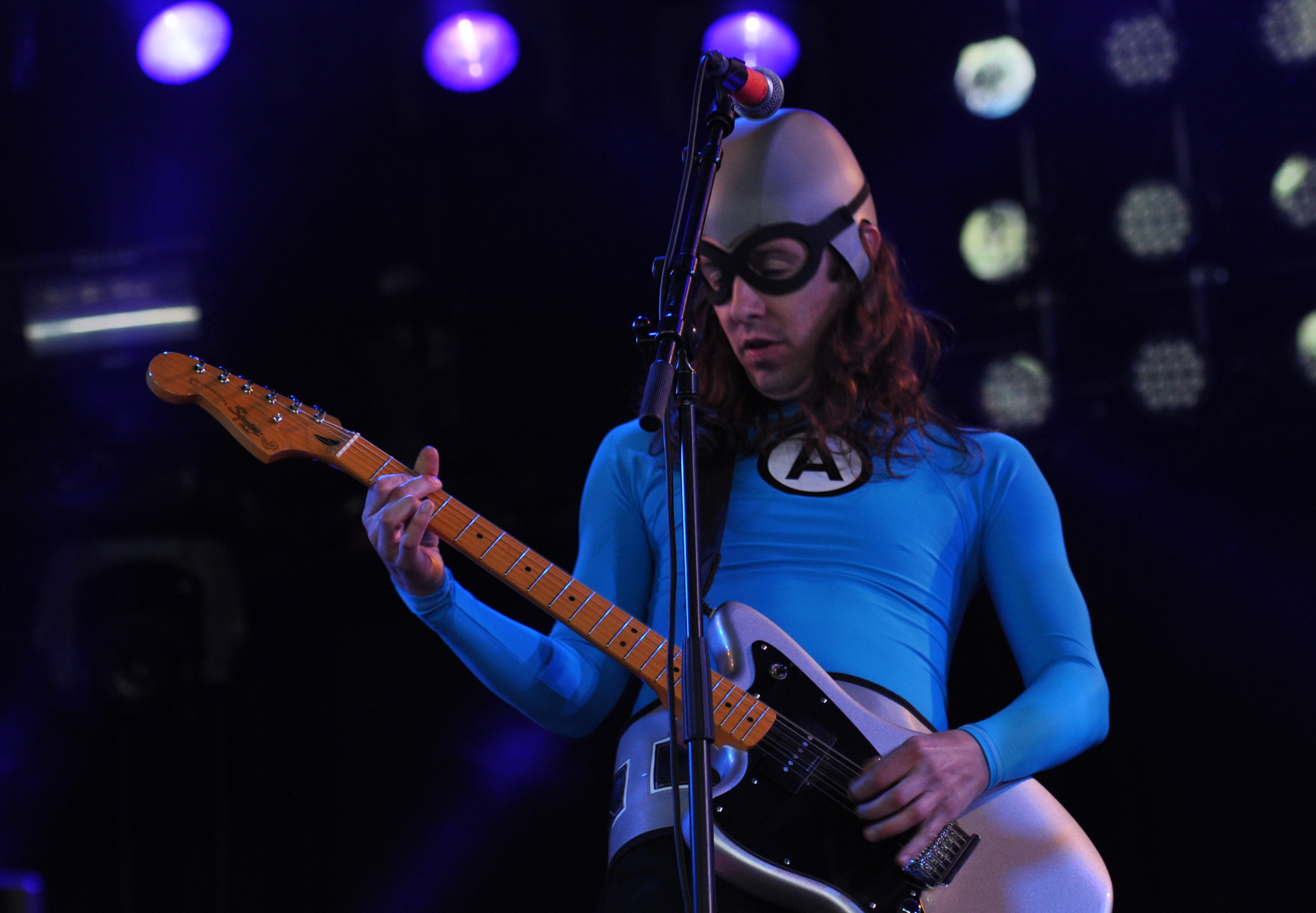
- Fowles performing with The Aquabats in December 2012

Background information
- Also known as: Eagle "Bones" Falconhawk; EagleBones Falconhawk
- Born: Ian Walton Fowles; January 1, 1979 (age 47)
- Genres: Punk rock; hardcore punk; new wave; emo
- Occupations: Musician; author; actor
- Instruments: Guitar; bass guitar
- Years active: 1995–present

Ian Walton Fowles (born January 1, 1979) is an American musician, author, and actor, best known as the current guitarist for the Orange County rock band The Aquabats, in which he performs under the stage name and persona of EagleBones Falconhawk (originally Eagle "Bones" Falconhawk). Prior to joining The Aquabats, Fowles was also one of the founding members of the hardcore punk band Death by Stereo.

== Biography ==
=== Early life and Death by Stereo ===
Fowles grew up in Orange County, California, and started playing guitar in his early teen years, having been inspired by seeing the guitarist character of Marty McFly in the film Back to the Future. By age 14, he was regularly playing in local punk bands, including one band called CleanX, who opened for The Aquabats in the late 1990s. In 1997, Fowles put together the original formation of Orange County hardcore punk band Death by Stereo, naming the band, designing its logo, and writing/recording on the band's early demos and EPs. In late 1998, Fowles left the group to serve a two-year mission for the LDS Church in Ohio. Though he didn't record on Death by Stereo's debut LP If Looks Could Kill, I'd Watch You Die, he was given writing credits on nine of the album's fourteen songs, many of which had appeared on earlier demos and EPs.

=== The Aquabats ===
In 2006, Fowles joined the Huntington Beach superhero-themed comedy rock band The Aquabats as a full-time member, succeeding longtime guitarist Corey Pollock (aka "Chainsaw, the Prince of Karate"). His stage name was conceived in The Aquabats' van during his first tour with the band: "Bones" was derived from his slender stature, while the bird names were playing off his surname's similarity to "fowl". Fowles first started writing and recording with the band in 2007 on original songs for the children's television series Yo Gabba Gabba!, on which he also appeared onscreen with the band and played a guitar solo as part of the show's "Cool Tricks" segment. He later made his album debut with The Aquabats on their 2010 EP Radio Down!.

From 2012 to 2014, Fowles portrayed Eaglebones Falconhawk in two seasons of The Aquabats' live-action cable television series The Aquabats! Super Show!, on which he also worked composing original songs as well as bits of the series' score. Starting in September 2019, he has since continued this role on the series' independent YouTube-based relaunch, The Aquabats! RadVentures!.

=== Other musical endeavors ===
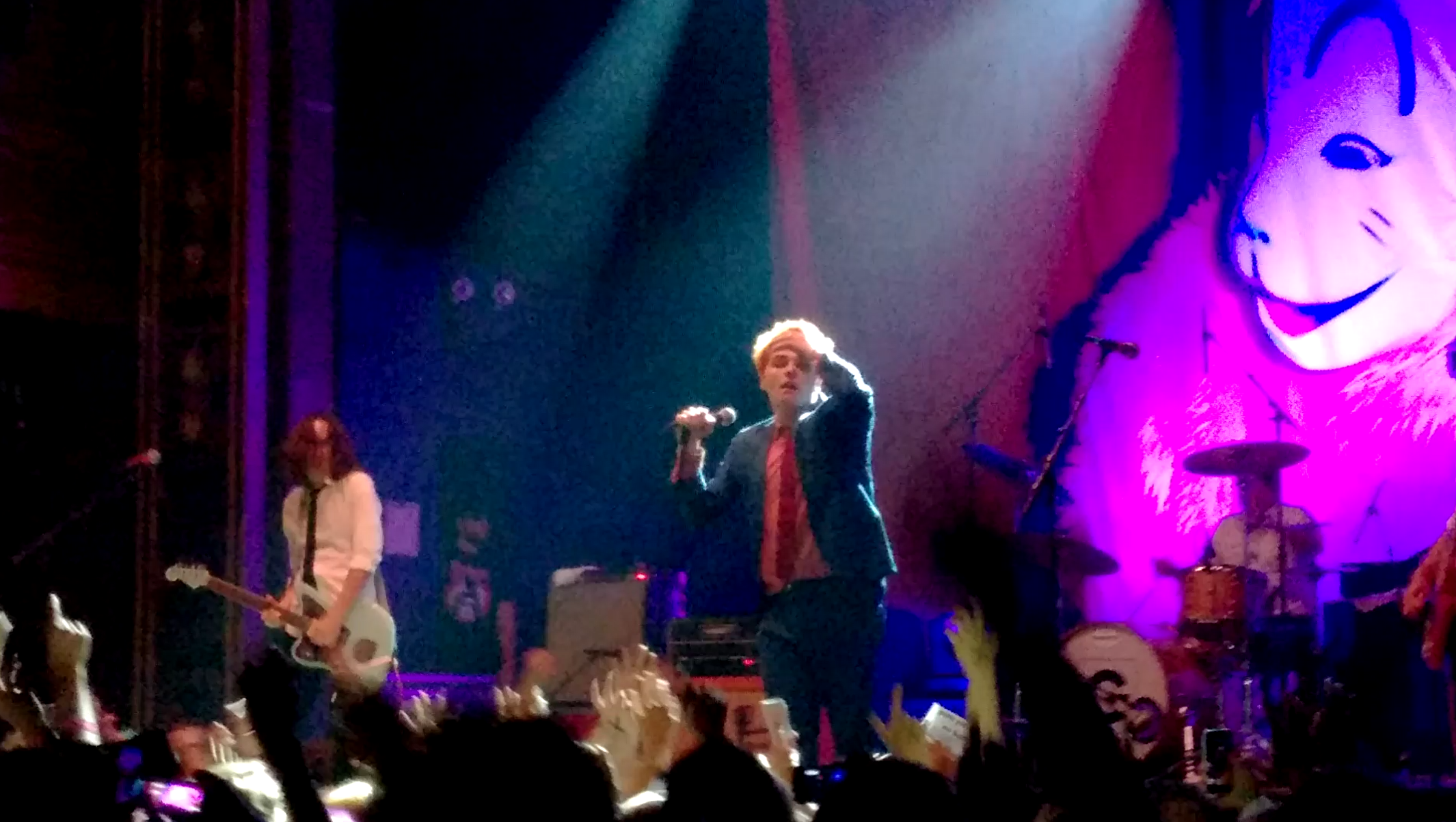
Fowles (left) performing with Gerard Way in New York in 2014.

Fowles has played live and/or recorded with a myriad of other projects, typically spanning the genres of pop punk and alternative rock. While attending high school in the mid-1990s he played in the bands CleanX and D-cons. In late 2000 he formed a short-lived 1980s pop tribute band called The Electric Youth that featured friends from Esperanza High School Brandon Saller of Atreyu and Nathan Willett of Cold War Kids. In 2003 he was the touring guitarist of Sense Field. In 2005–2006 he toured as the guitarist of Further Seems Forever. Among the groups he has collaborated with are Checkpoint Charley, Brandon Saller, and Dead Sara. In 2007, Fowles played bass for AFI member Hunter Burgan's side project Hunter Revenge, who accompanied The Aquabats on their winter holiday tour that year. In 2013 he also played bass with Kepi Ghoulie's band when they toured with The Aquabats on their holiday tour. In June 2015, Fowles and Aquabats drummer Ricky Falomir played in former Ramones bassist C. J. Ramone's band for an East Coast tour with Shonen Knife. Fowles has continued to play guitar for C.J. Ramone from time to time since.

In August 2014, Fowles was revealed to be the guitarist for My Chemical Romance frontman Gerard Way's solo project, recording guitar and percussion for Way's debut album Hesitant Alien, appearing in the music video for its single "No Shows", and doing all the live touring with him during 2014–2015.

=== Personal life ===
Fowles is left-handed, and currently plays a left-handed Fender Squier Vintage Modified Jazzmaster model guitar with The Aquabats and a left-handed Fender Kurt Cobain Jaguar model with Gerard Way. In 2022 he released the "Falcondrive" pedal for guitars, based on his signature overdriven sound.

Like fellow Aquabats bandmates Christian Jacobs and Chad Larson, Fowles is a practicing Latter-day Saint. He is also a doctoral student at Claremont Graduate University, where he studies at the School of Religion. In November 2010, Fowles published his first book, an extension of his master's thesis entitled A Sound Salvation: Rock N' Roll as a Religion, a thesis which argues that rock music and culture satisfy an influential definition of "religion" in contemporary religious studies.

== Bibliography ==
- A Sound Salvation: Rock N' Roll as a Religion (2010)

== Filmography ==
=== Television ===
Year	Title	Role	Notes
2012–2014	The Aquabats! Super Show!	Eaglebones Falconhawk/ Composer	21 episodes
2007–2014	"Yo Gabba Gabba!"	Eaglebones Falconhawk/ Production Assistant	23 Episodes

== Discography ==
=== Gerard Way ===
- Dasher single (featuring Lydia Night) (2018) – guitar
- Baby You're a Haunted House single (2018) – guitar
- Pinkish/Don't Try 7" (2016) – guitar
- Hesitant Alien (2014) – guitar, percussion

=== Extra Arms ===
- Up From Here (2019) – guitar solo on title track

=== Kepi Ghoulie ===
- Lost And Loving It (2016) – guitar
- Valentines Day 7" (2015) – guitar, producer

=== The Aquabats ===
- Finally! (2024) - guitar, bass
- Kooky Spooky...In Stereo (2020) – guitar, vocals
- The Aquabats! Super Show! Television Soundtrack: Volume One (2019) – guitar, bass, lead and backing vocals
- Hi-Five Soup! (2011) – guitar, backing vocals
- Radio Down! (2010) – guitar, backing vocals

=== Checkpoint Charley ===
- Pomp, Twaddle & Bombast: Songs 13–24 (2018) – guitar
- Songs One Through Twelve (2005) – guitar

=== Death By Stereo ===
- If Looks Could Kill, I'd Watch You Die (1999) – writing credits on tracks 3,5,6,7,8,9,11,12,13
- Devil's Night – Live Compilation 7" (1998) – guitar
- Fooled By Your Smile 7" (1998) – guitar
- Demo Cassette (1998) – guitar

=== D-Cons ===
- The Operation Room CDEP (1998) – guitar, backing vocals
- Can't Pull My Strings 7" (1997) – guitar, backing vocals
- Fed Up Demo Tape (1996) – guitar
