= Ricky Falomir =

American drummer (born 1976)

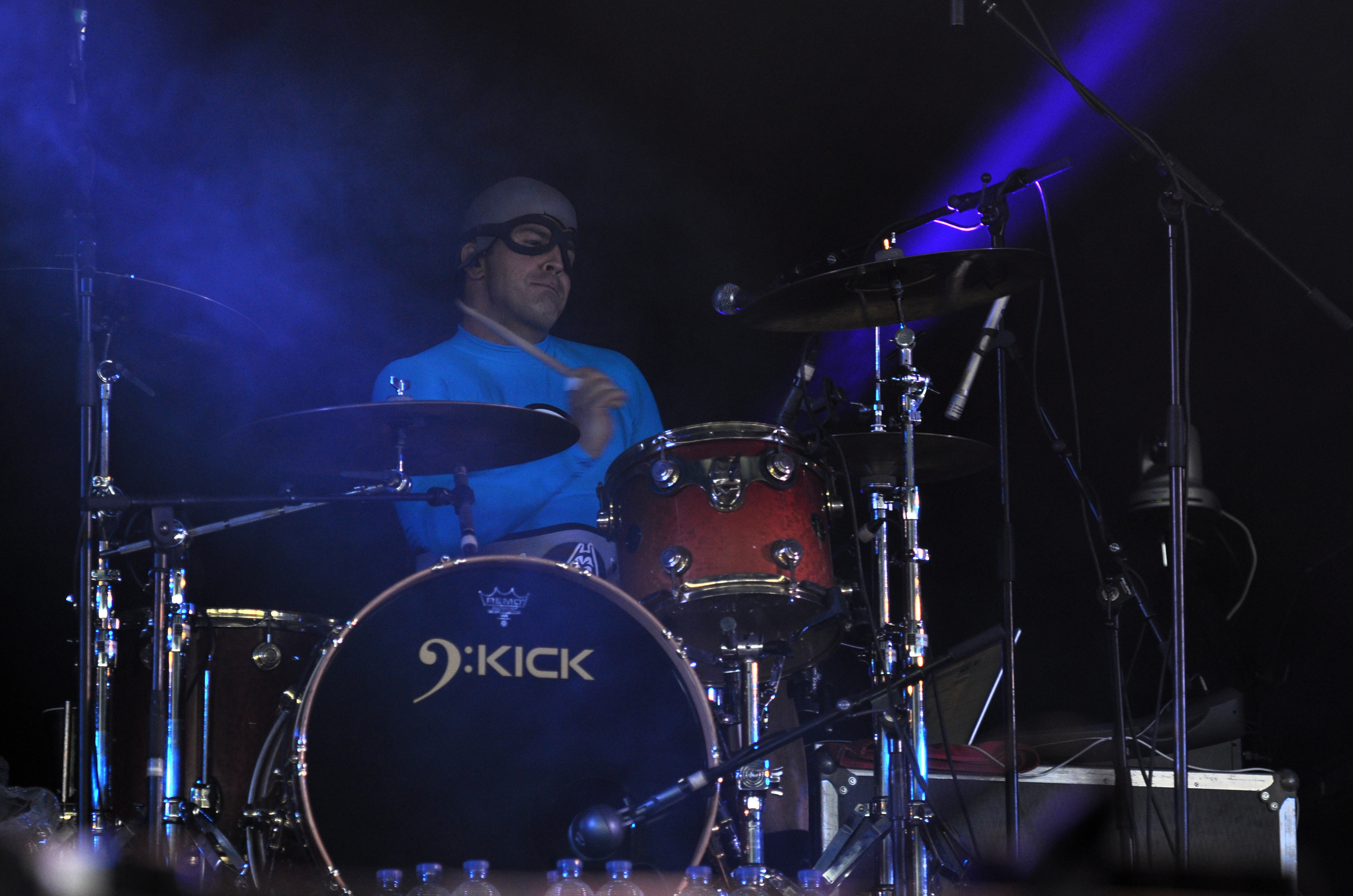
- Falomir with The Aquabats in 2013

Background information
- Also known as: Ricky Fitness
- Born: Richard Timothy Falomir; May 12, 1976 (age 50); Los Angeles, California, U.S.
- Occupations: Musician, composer
- Instruments: Drums, percussion
- Years active: 1996–present
- Member of: The Aquabats
- Formerly of: Assorted Jelly Beans

Richard Timothy Falomir (born May 12, 1976) is an American musician and composer, perhaps best recognized as the current drummer for the Orange County rock band The Aquabats, in which he performs under the stage name and persona of Ricky Fitness.

== Biography ==
Prior to joining The Aquabats in 2002, Falomir was an original member of the Riverside punk rock band Assorted Jelly Beans, up until the group's disbandment in 1999. Assorted Jelly Beans reunited in 2008 and continue to play sporadically throughout southern California. In 2009, Falomir also briefly served as a touring drummer for the Los Angeles reggae group The Aggrolites, and in June 2014 played drums for C. J. Ramone on an East Coast US tour alongside fellow Aquabats guitarist Ian Fowles.

Outside of his band, Falomir works as a composer, arranger and music director for the children's television series Yo Gabba Gabba!, alongside several other members of The Aquabats including series co-creator Christian Jacobs. He has made several onscreen appearances on the series, playing both costumed monsters and as his Ricky Fitness persona. From 2012 to 2014, Falomir also portrayed Ricky Fitness in The Aquabats' cable television series The Aquabats! Super Show! and again on the series' 2019 YouTube revival The Aquabats! RadVentures!, where he also serves as a composer for many of the songs featured in the show.

On June 16, 2024, Falomir released his first solo EP titled "Soul Cool".

== Discography ==
=== Assorted Jelly Beans ===
- Assorted Jelly Beans - Assorted Jelly Beans (1996) - drums, vocals
- Assorted Jelly Beans - What's Really Going On!? (1998) - drums, vocals
- Assorted Jelly Beans - WWW.Y2KTheory.EP..A.J.B..Com (1999) - drums, vocals

=== The Aquabats ===
- Yo! Check Out This Ride! EP (2004) - drums
- Charge!! (2005) - drums
- Radio Down! (2010) - drums, vocals
- Hi-Five Soup! (2011) - drums, vocals
- The Aquabats! Super Show! Television Soundtrack: Volume One (2019) - drums, lead and backing vocals
- Kooky Spooky...In Stereo (2020) - drums, vocals
- Finally! (2024) - drums, percussion, vocals

=== Solo Works ===
- Soul Cool - EP (2024)
