= Christopher Moll =

American songwriter

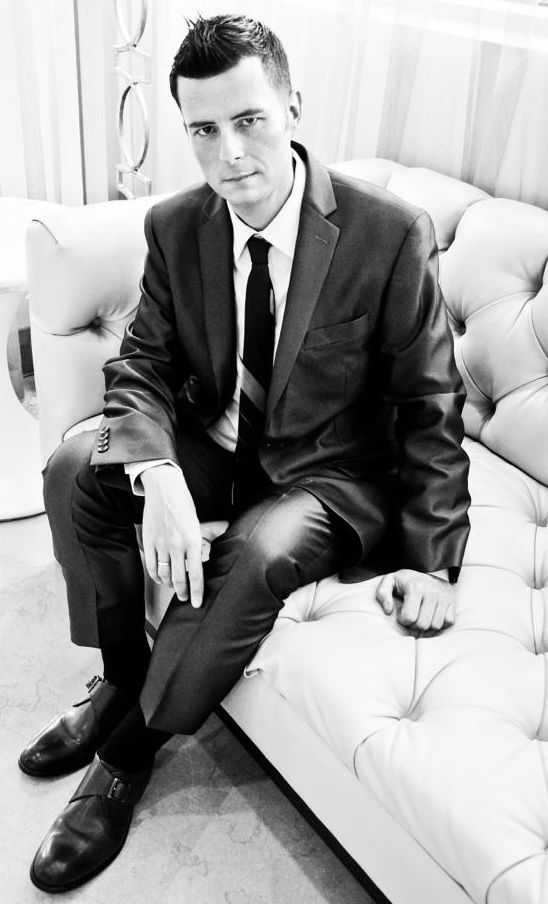

Background information
- Born: March 16, 1970 (age 56)
- Origin: Ogdensburg, New Jersey, United States
- Occupations: Singer-songwriter, composer
- Instruments: Guitars, bass, keyboards, vocals
- Labels: Unfiltered, ILG/, Warner Bros. Records

Christopher Moll is an American producer, singer-songwriter and multi-instrumentalist originally from Bronx, New York. He has produced, written and recorded under the name The Postmarks, releasing three CDs on Unfiltered Records/ILG/Warner Bros. Records. In 2014 he released an album as The Lovers Key.

== Career ==
=== Twenty-Three (23) ===
Upon relocation from New York City to Florida, Moll started his first band, Twenty-Three, which continued for three years with Moll (vocals/guitar), Alex Gimeno (drums) and Brian Hill (bass). Around the mid 1990s the trio decided to part musical ways yet still remain close friends.

=== See Venus ===
After Twenty-Three, Moll moved from Miami to West Palm Beach, Florida. At the end of the 1990s he met the principals of what would become See Venus. The group's first five songs were passed around as a homemade CD. A Swedish music dot-com interviewed Moll and thee songs received airtime on BBCradio. The band played a few local concerts, and obtained opening slots for national acts Trans Am and Rilo Kiley. They also performed in the fall of 2003 in Manhattan at the annual College Music Journal conference.

Including tracks recorded at various times between 2000 and 2003, March Records released Hard Time for Dreamers in early 2004.

=== The Postmarks ===
The Postmarks formed in 2004 when Christopher Moll began working with instrumentalist Jonathan Phillip Wilkins and singer Tim Yehezkely. The group recorded tracks at Moll's home studio in early 2005 for an album. The resulting songs led to Moll being described by Jeff Stratton of Broward Palm Beach New Times as a "gifted producer, with a reputation for transforming humdrum recordings into sharply re-conceptualized, marketable musical offerings", and attracted the notice of Andy Chase, who signed them to his Unfiltered Records label. The self-titled album The Postmarks received airplay before its February release. It entered at number thirteen on the College Music Journal Top 200 charts, rising as high as number seven.

The band spent the rest of the year touring, with appearances at CMJ, SXSW, and the Lollapalooza festival as well as receiving positive reviews in Rolling Stone and Spin, as well as Pitchfork Media. The group is also featured in the "Love" episode of the Nick Jr. show, Yo Gabba Gabba!.

In 2008, Christopher decided to record and release a new song each month with each month represented by a cover version of a song with a number in it; January was "One Note Samba," February was "You Only Live Twice," and so on. In November the songs were collected on CD under the title ‘By-the-Numbers’. Spin Magazine gave it 3 1/2 stars. Pitchfork gave it a 7.4 and CMJ Magazine had this to say: "a hauntingly beautiful work of art...even when performing covers, The Postmarks are an instant classic."

Meanwhile the band had begun work on its next album, Memoirs at the End of the World. Featuring the same core lineup, the album was released in September 2009, and featured more indie pop based on '60s film music. Following the release of the album, the most extensive touring to date took place, including the band's first visit to Europe.

==== The Lovers Key ====
After The Postmarks European tour, Moll took an extended sabbatical from music. He occasionally worked on songwriting projects until meeting singer, Maco Monthervil in the summer of 2012. While traveling to visit his family near the Gulf Coast of Florida, Moll noticed a highway sign for Lovers Key State Park. Moll decided to name his new project "The Lovers Key" and began working toward self-releasing an album in Spring 2014. Completed instead in September, the album, titled Here Today, Gone Tomorrow, was praised by Zachary Houle of Pop Matters as "an enjoyable listening experience, bar none".

== Discography ==
=== See Venus ===
Hard Times for Dreamers (2004)

=== The Postmarks ===
The Postmarks (2007)
By the Numbers (2008)
Memoirs at the End of the World (2009)

=== The Lovers Key ===
Here Today Gone Tomorrow (2014)
