= List of Yo Gabba Gabba! episodes =

The following is an episode list for the Yo Gabba Gabba! television series. The series debuted on Nickelodeon on August 20, 2007, and its original run ended on November 12, 2015. In 2021, it was announced that Apple TV+ had ordered 20 new episodes (Season 5) for its streaming service.

== Series overview ==
| Season | Episodes | Originally aired (U.S. dates) | |
| Season | Episodes | First aired | Last aired |
|---|---|---|---|
| Pilots | 3 | October 17, 2004, unaired | December 8, 2006, unaired |
| 1 | 20 | August 20, 2007 | May 23, 2008 |
| 2 | 20 | September 22, 2008 | October 16, 2011 |
| 3 | 13 | March 8, 2010 | September 20, 2011 |
| 4 | 13 | December 18, 2011 | November 12, 2015 |
| 5 | 20 | August 9, 2024 | January 30, 2026 |

== Yo Gabba Gabba! ==
=== Pilots: 2004-2006 ===
These pilots have not been broadcast.

| Prod. code | Title | Credited guests | Directed by | Written and storyboarded by | Original release date | Closing remix |
|---|---|---|---|---|---|---|
| Test Demo | "Yo Gabba" | Kids: Oskar Jacobs, Max Schultz | Unknown | Unknown | October 17, 2004, Unaired | None |
Games with Brobee: Shapes; Song:"Try It, You'll Like It"; Play Pretend with Muno: Tree; Learn with Plex: Make Your Bed
| P1 | "Short Story (Show #1)" | Biz Markie, Paul Frank's Julius the Monkey, Parker Jacobs; Kids: Brittney Chandara, Darla Jacobs, Oskar Jacobs, Tihane Wolfgramm, Max Schultz | Scott Schultz | Christian Jacobs | September 14, 2006, Unaired | Digital Unicorn |
Songs:"Don't Take it Away", "Party in My Tummy", "Jumpy, Jump, Jump", "Keep Trying"; Jingle: "Please, Thank You" by Parker Jacobs, Music by GOGO13; Biz's Beat of the Day Dancey Dance: "The Peanut Butter Stomp" with Paul Frank's Julius the Monkey; Funny Faces: Pull Mouth; Animation: "Animals in Nature", Music by Chad VanGaalen; Story Time: "The Bat Commander in Who Stole the Candy?"; Learn with Plex: Make Your Bed
| P2 | "Play (Show #2)" | Ashley 1st, Biz Markie; Kids: Ham Wolfgramm, Juliet Ingram, Quincy Doss, Acia Sinclair | Christian Jacobs | Scott Schultz | December 8, 2006, Unaired | Craig Borell and Lance Robertson |
Songs:"Try It, You'll Like It", "I Love Flowers", "Don't Bite Your Friends", "I Like Bugs"; Funny Faces: Open Mouth; Numbers:'"La La Doodles"; Dancey Dance: "The Twirly Whirly" with Ashley 1st; Play Pretend with Muno: Tree; Story Time: "Bubblebeard the Pirate and the Jellybean House"; Biz's Beat of the Day; Colors with Brobee: Blue

=== Unaired Episode: 2015 ===
Episode not made to be broadcast.

| Prod. code | Title | Credited guests | Directed by | Written by | Super Music Friends Show | Original release date | Closing remix |
|---|---|---|---|---|---|---|---|
| N–A | "Mason" | Mason Fontana and Family | Unknown | Will Kindrick | "Lovely, Love My Family" by The Roots | Unaired | Unknown |
Mason goes to Gabbaland on a helicopter chair. Songs: Unknown Story Time: "Amazing Restaurant" Note: This episode is unaired, made specifically for Mason Fontana and his family with help from the Make-A-Wish Foundation.

=== Season 1: 2007–08 ===
All first-season episodes are written by Christian Jacobs and Scott Schultz (including others).

| Prod. code | Title | Credited guests | Directed by | Written by | Super Music Friends Show | Original release date | Closing remix |
|---|---|---|---|---|---|---|---|
| 1 | "Eat" | Elijah Wood; Mark Mothersbaugh; Kids: Holland Baum, Darla Jacobs, Myles Caldwell, Allison Bell | Scott Schultz | Christian Jacobs, Scott Schultz | None | August 20, 2007 | Digital Unicorn |
Songs: "Party in My Tummy", "Snacky, Snack, Snack", "Try It, You'll Like It", "Clean it Up"; Jingle: "Be Nice to Animals" by The Salteens; Learn with Plex: Brush Your Teeth; Dancey Dance: "The Puppetmaster" with Elijah Wood; Mark's Magic Pictures: Potato Bug; Numbers: Foods (Four); Funny Faces: Thumbs in Ears; Story Time: "Goon Fishin'"
| 2 | "Summer" | Adrian Turner; Kids: Erica O'Barr, Karlie Pascuzzo, Ben Harvey, Alex Lee | Christian Jacobs | Christian Jacobs, Scott Schultz | "Pool Party!" by The Aquabats | August 21, 2007 | Broken Spindles |
Songs: "Bubbles", "Summertime", "Jumpy, Jump, Jump", "Wait Your Turn"; Jingle: "This is What the Summer Brings" by Tony Goddess and The Silver Lining; Learn with Plex: Make Lemonade; Cool Tricks: Adrian Turner Cup stacking; DJ Lance Dance: "The Arm Wiggle"; Super Martian Robot Girl: "Jumbo Shrimp"; Listen to Sounds with Toodee: Ocean
| 3 | "Fun" | Kirstin Dorn; Kids: Caleb Carlin, Naomi Wong, Maren Hemeon, Jordan Robinson | Christian Jacobs | Christian Jacobs, Scott Schultz | "Banana" by The Aggrolites | August 22, 2007 | Sukho Lee |
Songs: "Breakfast Party in My Tummy", "What is Fun?", "Use Our Bodies", "Get the Sillies Out"; Jingle: "Listen" by Paco; Play Pretend with Muno: Monkey; DJ Lance Dance: "The Baby Isaac"; Cool Tricks: Kirstin Dorn Doing Gymnastics; Story Time: "Toot Your Horn"; Colors with Brobee: Green
| 4 | "Dance" | Héctor Jiménez, Yuko Araki, John and Sean Scott; Kids: Delaney Lamb, Karter Reid, Nicholas Vargas, Madison Lamb | Scott Schultz | Christian Jacobs, Scott Schultz | None | August 23, 2007 | Ricky Fitness |
Songs: "I Like to Dance" with Do It, "The Freeze Game", "I'm So Sorry", "Beaty Beat Beat"; Jingle: "Dancing's Easy" by Sizzle Me This; Play Pretend with Muno: Dinosaur; Dancey Dance: "Jumping Jellyfish" with Héctor Jiménez; Musicians Who Like to Play: Drums with Yuko Araki; Cool Tricks: John and Sean Scott Tap dancing; Funny Faces: Pull Mouth Wide; Super Martian Robot Girl: "Dance Party"; Listen to Sounds with Toodee: Chicken
| 5 | "Sleep" | Mark Mothersbaugh; Kids: Naomi Rossiter, Sadie Mei Lin, Dillon Metoyer, Brooklyn Borgquist | Scott Schultz | Christian Jacobs, Scott Schultz | "Pajama Party Time" by Chaos Chaos | August 27, 2007 | DJ Nobody |
Songs: "Hold Still (Settle Down)", "Nap Time", "Happy Thoughts", "Dreams"; Jingle: "Bedtime Lullaby" by Mark Kozelek; Learn with Plex: Put on Your Pajamas; Mark's Magic Pictures: Dog; Numbers: Sheep (Six); Funny Faces: Puffed Cheeks; Story Time: Moochy and Pooty in "Monster Truck"; Listen to Sounds with Toodee: Crickets
| 6 | "Happy" | Mark Mothersbaugh, Sukho Lee, Leslie Hall; Kids: Nathaniel Wong, Haydn Norwood, Megan Lamb, Skylar Hutcheon | Scott Schultz | Scott Schultz, Christian Jacobs | "I'm So Happy I Can Dance" by The Salteens | August 28, 2007 | Adventure Time |
Songs: "I'm Not Afraid", "Hugs are Fun", "I am So Happy", "Sometimes We Win, Sometimes We Lose"; Jingle: "Kites are Fun" by The Parallelograms, originally by The Free Design; Listen to Sounds with Toodee: Bird; Mark's Magic Pictures: Happy Face; Cool Tricks: Sukho Lee playing "Brahms' Lullaby" on the theremin; Super Martian Robot Girl: "Where's My Mama?"; Games with Foofa: Matching Game - Purple Octopus
| 7 | "Friends" | Mýa, Mark Mothersbaugh, Marshall Hough; Kids: Jordan Riley Bassallo, Calista Witten, Logan Blake, Phoenix Linn Wright | Christian Jacobs | Christian Jacobs, Scott Schultz | None | August 29, 2007 | Otis Fodder |
Songs: "My Friends", "High Fives", "It's Your Turn", "Hands to Yourself"; Jingle: "Share" by The Aquabats; Learn with Plex: Put Your Toys Away; Dancey Dance: "The Peanut Butter Stomp" with Mýa; Mark's Magic Pictures: Fish; Cool Tricks: Marshall Hough Hanging a spoon from his nose; DJ Lance Dance: "The Eagle Has Landed"; Story Time: "Faldarz and the Yellow Alien"; Colors with Brobee: Yellow
| 8 | "Careful" | Biz Markie; Kids: Ke-Ming Yen, Logan Ricketts, Gracie Lamb, Max Schultz | Scott Schultz | Scott Schultz, Christian Jacobs | "Up & Down" by Supernova | August 30, 2007 | Frequent Flyer feat. Ricky F |
Songs: "Up, Down", "Shake it Off", "Don't Throw Things at Friends", "Danger!"; Jingle: "Family Tree" by Low; Learn with Plex: Make a Snack; Biz's Beat of the Day; Numbers: Skating (Nine/Ten); Funny Faces: Pull Ears; Story Time: Moochy and Pooty in "Gettin' Messy"; Colors with Brobee: Red
| 9 | "Move" | Tony Hawk, Ricky Fitness, Venum Break Dancers; Kids: Kelly Byers, Evan Gilbert, Diego Calderon, Nichole Tabio | Christian Jacobs | Scott Schultz, Christian Jacobs | None | September 24, 2007 | Weird Science |
Songs: "Hold Still (Play a Game)", "Skippy, Skip, Skip", "Nice and Easy", "Hands To The Beat"; Jingle: "Pick It Up" by GOGO13 and Alex Désert; Musicians Who Like to Play: Drums with Ricky Fitness; Learn with Plex: Wash Your Hair; Dancey Dance: Skateboarding with Tony Hawk; Cool Tricks: Venum Break Dancers; Funny Faces: Pull Lips Down; Story Time: "Bruce the Moose"
| 10 | "Greetings" | Biz Markie; Kids: Xanthe & Xoe Villa, Lamese Patterson, Timothy Li, Keeley Larson | Scott Schultz | Scott Schultz, Christian Jacobs | "Medley of the Yo Gabba Gabba! Classics" by The Wolfgramms | September 25, 2007 | La Casa Azul |
Songs: "The Hello Song", "The Name Game", "Excuse Me (You're Excused)", "The Goodbye Song (Magic Ball Friends Version)"; Jingle: "Hello, Goodbye" by I'Kona; Animation: "Please, Thank You"; Biz's Beat of the Day; Numbers: Drumming Numbers (Eight); DJ Lance Dance: "The Rock-Rock"; Super Martian Robot Girl: "Do You Like My Haircut?"; Colors with Brobee: Brown
| 11 | "Together" | Mark Mothersbaugh, Nikki Flores; Kids: Max Edward Fackrell, Angel Gibbs, Andrea Augustus, Aidan Masinsin | Christian Jacobs | Christian Jacobs, Scott Schultz | None | September 26, 2007 | Mark DeNardo |
Songs: "The Face Song", "Baby Steps, Big Steps", "Don't Bite Your Friends", "Teamwork"; Jingle: "Love Every Living Thing" by Call Sound Call Noise; Play Pretend with Muno: Horse; Dancey Dance: "The Twirly Whirly" with Nikki Flores; Mark's Magic Pictures: Monkey; Numbers: Fingers (Ten); DJ Lance Dance: "The Funky Penguin"; Super Martian Robot Girl: "Dance of the Cobraman"
| 12 | "Scary" | Leslie Hall, DJ Dr. Laura, Junior Gems, Mark Mothersbaugh, Adam Deibert; Kids: Audrey Brown, Cole Bates, Maddie South, Collin Niles | Christian Jacobs | Christian Jacobs, Scott Schultz | None | September 27, 2007 | Turbo Funky |
Songs: "Don't Be Afraid", "I Like Bugs", "Try It, You'll Like It", "Tiny Ugly Germs"; Jingle: "Different Shapes" by Frequent Flyer; Play Pretend with Muno: Astronaut; Dancey Dance: "The Razzle Dazzle" with Leslie Hall, DJ Dr. Laura, and The Junior Gems; Mark's Magic Pictures: Cat; Cool Tricks: Adam Deibert playing "Twinkle, Twinkle, Little Star" with his hands; DJ Lance Dance: "The Big Bounce"; Games with Foofa: Matching Game - Shapes
| 13 | "Halloween" | Rebecca Gallo; Kids: Seth Yu, Emma Blackburn, Oskar Jacobs, Sadie Templin | Christian Jacobs | Christian Jacobs, Scott Schultz | "Halloween at the House of Spooks" by Shiny Toy Guns | October 29, 2007 | DJ Sifa |
Songs: "It is Fall", "Halloween", "Trick or Treat", "Too Much Candy"; Jingle: "It's Halloween" by I Monster and Philly Smith; Listen to Sounds with Toodee: Cat; DJ Lance Dance: "The Teeter-Totter"; Cool Tricks: Rebecca Gallo demonstrates Taekwondo; Super Martian Robot Girl: "Halloween Party"; Colors with Brobee: Orange
| 14 | "Car" | Sugarland, Biz Markie, Ian Fowles, Jodey Lawrence; Kids: Sean Fujiwara, Kate Sneddon, Lauren Haneke-Hopps, Devon Dahl | Christian Jacobs | Christian Jacobs, Scott Schultz | None | November 26, 2007 | Mouse on Mars |
Songs: "Keep Trying (Plex and Muno)", "Dangerous", "Remember", "Driving in a Car"; Jingle: "Look Both Ways" by The Aggrolites; Play Pretend with Muno: Snake; Dancey Dance: "The Electric Eel" with Sugarland; Biz's Beat of the Day; Cool Tricks: Ian "Bones" Fowles from The Aquabats and Jodey Lawrence from Supernova playing guitar; Funny Face: Thumb to Nose; Story Time: "Naughty Gordy"; Listen to Sounds with Toodee: Laughing
| 15 | "Share" | Biz Markie; Kids: Juliet Ingram, Sydney Shepherd, Alyssa Augustus, Damon Dahl | Scott Schultz | Scott Schultz, Christian Jacobs | "Count Five or Six" by Cornelius | November 27, 2007 | Ann Shenton |
Songs: "Mine and Yours", "I Love to Share", "Catch and Throw", "Don't Take it Away"; Jingle: "Sometimes You Win, Sometimes You Lose" by Dean & Britta; Play Pretend with Muno: Elephant; Biz's Beat of the Day; Numbers: Blocks (Five); DJ Lance Dance: "The Jump Step"; Super Martian Robot Girl: "Sounds of the Dolphin"; Colors with Brobee: Purple
| 16 | "Find" | Sean Kingston, Mark Mothersbaugh, Rahzel; Kids: Kamryn Knapp, Mason Johnson, Garrison Raine, Sarah Wang | Christian Jacobs | Christian Jacobs, Scott Schultz | None | November 28, 2007 | Languis |
Songs: "I Like Fish", "Peek-a-Boo", "What is It?", "Keep Trying (Toodee and Brobee)"; Jingle: "Come and Play" by The Little Ones; Listen to Sounds with Toodee: Pig; Dancey Dance: "The Mini Spinny" with Sean Kingston; Mark's Magic Pictures: Truck; Cool Tricks: Rahzel performs beatboxing; Funny Face: Tongue to Nose; Super Martian Robot Girl: "Funny Bunny"; Learn with Plex: Wash Your Hands
| 17 | "Train" | Laila Ali, Biz Markie; Kids: Gillian Anderton, Ham Wolfgramm, Hannah Dahl, Johann Johnson | Scott Schultz | Christian Jacobs, Scott Schultz | None | November 29, 2007 | Twink |
Songs: "Teamwork", "Don't Be Afraid", "Train Ride", "Inside Voice, Outside Voice"; Jingle: "Train Ride" by Tahiti 80; Games with Foofa: Maze; Dancey Dance: "The Dog" with Laila Ali; Biz's Beat of the Day; Numbers: Objects (Ten); Funny Face: Push Up Nose; Story Time: Moochy and Pooty in "Up, Down"; Colors with Brobee: Pink
| 18 | "Christmas" | Mark Mothersbaugh, The Snow Princess (claymation, stop motion); Kids: Ollie Schultz, Gabreon Womack, Madison Reid, India Clash-King | Scott Schultz | Scott Schultz, Christian Jacobs | None | December 21, 2007 | Mike Relm |
Songs: "I Love Winter", "Decorate the Tree", "Making Presents", "For Me, For You"; Jingle: "Christmas Time" by Jason Lytle; Play Pretend with Muno: Christmas Tree; Dancey Dance: "The Snowy Jingle" with The Snow Princess (voiced by Shannon Friden)*; Mark's Magic Pictures: Snowman; Numbers: Animals in the Forest (Five); Funny Face: Face Squish; Story Time: "Santa's Helpers"; NOTE: The Snow Princess is the first stop motion Dancey Dance friend.
| 19 | "Love" | Mark Mothersbaugh; Kids: Brayden Blackburn, Quincy Doss, Imani Pullman, Hailey Abbott | Scott Schultz | Scott Schultz, Christian Jacobs | "Balloons" by The Postmarks | February 14, 2008 | The Salteens |
Songs: "Keep Trying (Toodee and Foofa)", "I Love You", "I Love Flowers", "Be Nice to Everyone (With DJ Lance solo)"; Jingle: "I Found Love" by Trembling Blue Stars, originally by The Free Design; Mark's Magic Pictures: Elephant; Numbers: Surfing – Part 1 (Five); DJ Lance Dance: "The March"; Storytime: "Alfcore"; Matching Game with Foofa
| 20 | "Imagine" | Kids: Penelope Jacobs, Julia Bergeson, Sila Patterson, Max Larson | Christian Jacobs | Christian Jacobs, Scott Schultz | "It's O.K., Try Again" by The Shins | May 23, 2008 | Majestic |
Songs: "Let's Pretend", "Balloons (Full Cast)", "Tell the Truth", "Things Inside Your Body"; Jingle: "Some Things Are Big, Some Things Are Small" by Jason Falkner; Maze Game with Foofa; Numbers: Surfing – Part 2 (Ten); DJ Lance Dance: "The Boing"; Story Time: "Charlie C"; Colors with Brobee: Blue

=== Season 2: 2008–11 ===
Production of the second season was greenlit on December 18, 2007. Production started in March 2008 in Orange County, California.

| Prod. code | Title | Credited guests | Directed by | Written by | Super Music Friends Show | Original release date | Closing remix |
|---|---|---|---|---|---|---|---|
| 21 | "Teeth" | Amy Sedaris, Shannon Edwards and Strawberry the Donkey, Mark Mothersbaugh; Kids: Curtis & Jon Jon Bucher, Alexis Fowlkes, Indy Alter | Scott Schultz | Scott Schultz, Christian Jacobs | "Smile for the Camera" by Datarock | October 23, 2008 | Twink |
DJ Lance recalls the day Muno lost his baby teeth and awaits a visit from the Tooth Fairy. Songs: "Baby Teeth", "Tooth Fairy", "Baby Teeth, Big Teeth"; Jingle: "Brush, Brush, Brush" by of Montreal; Mark's Magic Pictures: Tooth; Story Time: "The Alligator and the Tiny Ugly Cavities"; Cool Tricks: Shannon Edwards makes Strawberry the Donkey smile
| 22 | "Birthday" | Biz Markie, Melora Hardin, Parker Jacobs, Mark Mothersbaugh; Kids: Preston Rex, Marina Nakamura, Hui Hui Mothersbaugh, Jake Johns | Christian Jacobs | Christian Jacobs, Scott Schultz | "Happy Birthday" by The Ting Tings | September 22, 2008 | Tyger Ryder |
It's Brobee's fourth birthday today, so the Gabba Gang throw a surprise birthday party for him. Songs: "My Birthday", "It's a Party for Brobee", "Having a Party"; Jingle: "Happy Birthday" by Tyger Ryder; Biz's Beat of the Day; Cool Tricks: Parker Jacobs Baking special birthday cakes; Dancey Dance: "The Birthday Party Dancey Dance" with Melora Hardin
| 23 | "Games" | Jaclyn Paris Jacobs, Mark Mothersbaugh, The Clientele; Kids: Margaux Windes, Jada Ugapo, Maxton Seitz | Matthew J. Fackrell | Scott Schultz, Christian Jacobs, Matthew J. Fackrell | "No One Wants to Be Left Out" by Mates of State | September 23, 2008 | Mark Denardo |
The Gabba Gang play some games for Game Day. Songs: "DJ Lance Says", "Freeze Tag", "March with Me"; Jingle: "Play With Me" by The Clientele; Mark's Magic Pictures: Golf; Story Time: "Bayou Boat Race"; Cool Tricks: Jaclyn "Jackie" Paris Jacobs Playing the Recorder Through Nose
| 24 | "Green" | Ethan Bortnick, Mark Mothersbaugh; Kids: Keturah Harris, Myles Tan, Jacob Dahl | Christian Jacobs | Dan Clark | "Hello World" by Selema Masekela and The Gabbaland Band | April 22, 2009 | Digital Unicorn |
The Gabba Gang learn about keeping the world nice and clean. Songs: "Water", "Throw Us Away", "We're Counting on You"; Jingle: "Fruit" by YMCK; Mark's Magic Pictures: Tree; DJ Lance Dance: "The Crazy Daisy"; Story Time: "Cloudie The Cloud"; Cool Tricks: Ethan Bortnick plays piano
| 25 | "Talent" | Logan Knight, Mark Mothersbaugh, Biz Markie, Amar'e Stoudemire; Kids: Jasmine Sablan, Rocky Steimle, Isaak Bowman | Scott Schultz | Dan Clark | "Time to Go Outdoors" by Hot Hot Heat | September 24, 2008 | The Parallelograms |
It is Talent Day in Gabbaland, but Brobee has one problem: he doesn't have a talent! Songs: "What is My Talent?", "Keep Thinking", "What's Your Talent?"; Jingle: "What Are Your Talents?" by Joy Zipper; Mark's Magic Pictures: Drawing of Mark; Biz's Beat of The Day; Dancey Dance: "The Amar'e Dribble" with Amar'e Stoudemire; Cool Tricks: Logan Knight performs The Belly Roll; Funny Face: Hands on Cheeks
| 26 | "Space" | Alien Guests: David Crespin, Joel Fox, Tara Pearce, Julia Vickerman, Mossi Watene; Kids: Gracie Caccavo, David DeVilliers, Mia Strong | Jason deVilliers | Jason deVilliers | "Zero Gravity" by Electrocute | February 25, 2011 | Blake Miller |
DJ Lance Rock and the Gabba Gang fly in a rocket to a sparkling planet. Songs: "Little Lights in the Sky", "Rocket Ride", "We're All Different"; Jingle: "Eye to The Sky" by Pinback; Story Time: "Lloyd and the Asteroids"; Numbers: Counting Astronauts; DJ Lance Dance: "The Moon Bounce"
| 27 | "Weather" | Jack McBrayer, Paul Scheer; Kids: Archer Calder, Honor Jones, Kyndell Jasper-Rainey | Scott Schultz | Scott Schultz | "Rainbow Connection" by Paul Williams | October 20, 2008 | Tyger Ryder |
Muno, Foofa, and Plex see a rainbow and follow it to a hidden treasure. Songs: "The Rain is Falling", "Rainbows", "Springtime Sunny Day"; Jingle: "I Love the Rain" by Frequent Flyer; Knock-Knock Joke of the Day: "Ken"; DJ Lance Dance: "The Rain Cloud"; Story Time: "Water Drops & Oil"; Numbers: "A Day in The Park"
| 28 | "Robot" | Rhys Darby, Mark Mothersbaugh; Kids: Indy Miller, Nathan Van Woerkom, Samantha Allred | Christian Jacobs | Christian Jacobs, Scott Schultz | "Robodancing" by Money Mark | October 22, 2008 | Blake Miller |
Plex teaches Brobee and Toodee about robots. Songs: "The Robot Song", "Electricity", "The Robot Game"; Jingle: "We are the Robots" by Enon; Mark's Magic Pictures: Robot Gorilla; Cool Tricks: Rhys Darby Pretends to be a Robot; DJ Lance Dance: "The Robot Recharge"; Story Time: "Prof. Whizbang and the Robot Planet"
| 29 | "Differences" | Leslie Hall, Mark Mothersbaugh; Kids: Hallee Fernley, Noah Walker, Taryn Lennon | Scott Schultz | Scott Schultz | "Just Because It's Different Doesn't Mean It's Scary" by I'm From Barcelona | October 21, 2008 | Guilie Milkyway |
Muno gets glasses after he can't see very well. Songs: "I've Got Glasses (I Can See Much Better)", "Don't Say Mean Things to Friends", "All My Friends are Different"; Jingle: "I Wear Glasses" by I'Kona; Mark's Magic Pictures: Carrot; Story Time: "Argyle the Octopus"; Numbers: "Love Me"
| 30 | "Animals" | Jack McBrayer, Paul Scheer; Kids: Al España, Ben Johnson, Chloe Turner | Christian Jacobs | Tiffany Campbell | "Beautiful Day" by Jimmy Eat World | September 25, 2008 | Tommie Sunshine |
The Gabba Gang learn about animals. Songs: "What is It?", "Who Made These Tracks?", "I Like to Dance (Animal Card Game Version)", Jingle: "Animal Sounds" by The Aggrolites; Knock-Knock Joke of the Day: "Interrupting Cow"; DJ Lance Dance: "The Fox on the Run"; Story Time: "Cammy, Jenny, & Slater"; Numbers: Animals on the Farm
| 31 | "Band" | Biz Markie, The Yo-Dazzlers; Kids: Breonnah LeBeaux, June Berrett, Matthew Von Der Ahe | Scott Schultz | Scott Schultz | "When I Hear Music" by L'Trimm | October 15, 2009 | Digital Unicorn |
The Gabba Gang start their own band after they see a real band. Songs: "We Like to Rock", "Practice", "Make a Hit" adapted from "2002 - A Hit Song" by The Free Design; Jingle: "You Have to Be Patient" by Call Sound Call Noise; Biz's Beat of the Day; DJ Lance Dance: "The Marching Band"; Story Time: "The Music of Sound"; Numbers: Piano
| 32 | "Big" | Gumpelstiltskin, Mark Mothersbaugh; Kids: Kai Rex, Zach Tapp, Katie Hull | Christian Jacobs | Sarah Dyer, Evan Dorkin | "Some Things are Big, Some Things are Small" by Jem & The Yo Dazzlers | February 9, 2011 | Rafter |
Brobee is tired of being the smallest of the gang. After he accidentally gets zapped by Plex, he becomes big! Songs: "Big and Small", "Big Things, Small Things", "Catch and Throw", "Be Yourself"; Jingle: "Grow" by Rafter; Mark's Magic Pictures: Fleas on Skis; Cool Tricks: Gumpelstiltskin makes a balloon dog; DJ Lance Dance: "The Big Bop"; Story Time: "Sprinkles & the Bake Off"
| 33 | "Mystery" | Jack McBrayer, Paul Scheer, Biz Markie; Kids: Bianca Tapp, Nathan Chung, Jacob Lamb | Scott Schultz | Dan Clark | "Use Your Mind" by Ladytron | October 16, 2011 | Ursula 1000 |
DJ Lance Rock becomes a detective and finds Muno's cowboy hat. When Toodee and Plex find a note from Foofa, they set out on an adventure to find her and they wonder who Foofle (Foofa's older brother) is. Songs: "Look Again", "It's a Mystery", "Scared of the Dark"; Jingle: "Some Things are a Mystery" by Autolux; Biz's Beat of The Day; Knock-Knock Joke of the Day: "Sherlock"; Numbers: Opposites; Story Time: "The Missing Mooky Mooky Boo Boo Towel"
| 34 | "Family" | Emilee Ann, Jakob, & Jeremy Keppelmann, Kemba Russell, Mark Mothersbaugh (credited, but does not appear), Biz Markie (Uncredited); Kids: Tahiti Tafua, Ben & Sean McCoy, Kyra & Khrie Park | Christian Jacobs | Christian Jacobs, Sarah Dyer, Evan Dorkin | "Lovely, Love My Family" by The Roots | October 12, 2009 (Note: This episode was first released in Celebrate Family DVD on June 9, 2009.) | Mark Denardo |
Muno's family pay a special visit to Gabbaland. Songs: "That's Our Family", "Nice to Meet You", "Lemonade"; Jingle: "That's My Family" by The Apples in Stereo; Biz's Beat of The Day; Cool Tricks: Emilee, Jakob, and Jeremy Keppelmann play music together as a family; Funny Face: Cheek Pull and Wave
| 35 | "Ride" | Kids: Allie Kendig, Jaiden DeBois, Demi Remolador | Scott Schultz | Scott Schultz | "Let's Ride" by Dean & Britta | February 10, 2011 (Note: This episode was first released on Birthday Boogie DVD on February 2, 2010.) | The Parallelograms |
Everyone in Gabbaland are on the go today, DJ Lance Rock rollerskates, Muno and Plex rides skateboards, Foofa rides her bike, Brobee rides his scooter, and Toodee and Foofle rides surfboards. Songs: "Bikes are Fun", "Ouch That Hurt/Keep Your Balance", "Let's Go Surf"; Jingle: "Ride Ride Ride" by Digital Unicorn; DJ Lance Dance: "The Buckle Up"; Story Time: "Bike Race"; Numbers: Ice Cream Truck
| 36 | "Boat" | Jaliala Leiani Ray, Mark Mothersbaugh; Kids: Khloe Gutierrez, Joey Parker Hoke, Mikki Wolfgramm | Christian Jacobs | Christian Jacobs, Jordan Kim | "I Like Sandwiches" by Reeve Oliver | October 14, 2009 | DJ Game Kid |
The Gabba Gang ride on a boat to an island. Songs: "Boat Trip", "Try It, You'll Like It"/"Party in My Tummy", "At the Beach"; Jingle: "Sea Friends" by Mason Jennings; Mark's Magic Pictures: Goat in a Boat; Story Time: "The Menehunes"; Cool Tricks: Jaliala Leiani Ray performs the Tahitian Dance From the Islands
| 37 | "New Friends" | Jack Black, Ron Schrab, Jack McBrayer & Paul Scheer; Kids: Kainoa Shintaku, Peyton & Megan Steen, Lily Flake | Scott Schultz, Christian Jacobs | Scott Schultz, Christian Jacobs | "You Can't Always Get What You Want" by The Yo-Dazzlers | April 3, 2009 | Cowboy Fluesmith featuring Tyger Ryder |
After Jack Black and his talking motorcycle crash into Gabbaland, he feels lost. So the Gabba Gang show him how fun it is to spend time with your friends. Songs: "It's Not Fun to Get Lost", "New Friends", "The Goodbye Song (feat. Jack Black)"; Jingle: "In a Safe Land" by Tanya Haden and Petra Haden; DJ Lance Dance: "The Find It"; Dancey Dance: "The Disco Roll" with Jack Black; Knock-Knock Joke of the Day: "Cargo"
| 38 | "Art" | Andy Samberg, Ray Barbee, Mark Mothersbaugh; Kids: Andrew Webster, Hui Hui Mothersbaugh, Prem Shelat | Christian Jacobs | Christian Jacobs | "Art is Everywhere" by MGMT | October 13, 2009 | Digital Unicorn |
Gabbaland is having an art show. Muno is making a Rock statue, Foofa paints a painting, Brobee makes a collage, Toodee makes an ice sculpture, and Plex takes pictures to make a photo gallery. Songs: "Mixing Up Colors", "Don't Say Mean Things to Friends", "Art Show"; Jingle: "Favorite Colors" by Neil Halstead; Mark's Magic Pictures: Eggs with Legs; Cool Tricks: Ray Barbee rides a skateboard; Dancey Dance: "The Aligator Chomp" with Andy Samberg; DJ Lance Dance: "Paint a Rainbow"
| 39 | "Dress Up" | Mark Mothersbaugh; Kids: Devon Goosby, Drew Hutton, Eliza Buhrley | Scott Schultz | Scott Schultz | "Let's Dress Up" by The Little Ones | October 16, 2009 | Frequent Flyer |
The Gabba Gang play dress up. They put on funny hats, play cowboys and cowgirls, and play "Save the Princess from the Dragon". Songs: "Funny Hat", "Cowboy Muno", "Save the Princess"; Jingle: "New Pair of Shoes" by Les Savy Fav; Mark's Magic Pictures: Pirate; Story Time: "The Princess and the Dragon"; Numbers: Magic Blocks
| 40 | "Clean" | Ahmir "Questlove" Thompson and Frankie "Knuckles" Walker, Rachel Dratch; Kids: Haley Boren, Catherine Fields, Timmy Borquez | Christian Jacobs | Christian Jacobs, Dan Clark | "Nice 'n' Clean" by Chromeo | February 27, 2009 | Tyger Ryder featuring DJ Game Kid |
The Gabba Gang practices good cleanliness by washing their hands, taking a bath, and taking a shower. Songs: "Tiny Ugly Germs", "Super Soapy Pal", "Bath Time", "Shampoo Time"; Jingle: "Cover Your Mouth" by The Bird and the Bee; Musicians Who Like to Play: Drums with Questlove and Frank Knuckles; Numbers: "Happy Computer"; Dancey Dance: "The Groovy Cat" with Rachel Dratch

=== Season 3: 2010–11 ===
The third season started production in September 2009 and began airing on Nickelodeon in 2010 with an order of 13 episodes. The season was later split in half, making a fourth season.

| Prod. code | Title | Credited guests | Directed by | Written by | Super Music Friends Show | Original release date | Closing remix |
|---|---|---|---|---|---|---|---|
| 41 | "School" | Angela Kinsey, Mark Mothersbaugh, Matthew Polis; Kids: Dean Berrett, Jillian & Ryan Norried, Ainsley Schultz | Scott Schultz | Craig Windes, Scott Schultz | "Teach Me Teacher" by The Faint | September 19, 2010 | Frequent Flyer featuring Tyger Ryder |
The Gabba Gang start school and their teacher is Miss Angela (played by Angela Kinsey). Songs: "First Day of School", "At School (Here with All My Friends)", "Time for Show and Tell"; Jingle: "What Story Do You Want to Hear?" by Dr. Dog; Mark's Magic Pictures: Crayon; Funny Face: Chin Stroke; Story Time: "Seymour the Skateboard"; Cool Tricks: Matthew Polis jumping on a pogo stick
| 42 | "Adventure" | Mark Mothersbaugh; Kids: Buster Jacobs, Mika McDonald, Lucas Tafua | Christian Jacobs | Christian Jacobs, Jason deVilliers | "Spaceship Adventure" by The Killers | February 7, 2011 | Tyger Ryder |
After Plex finishes a story about an adventurer to the Gabba Gang, Muno becomes an adventurer and he and the rest of the gang walk down a secret passage way to a jungle underneath Gabbaland. Songs: "Adventure", "Through the Jungle", "Climb Up and Up"; Jingle: "Imagination Adventure" by Sunbears; Mark's Magic Pictures: Helicopter; Numbers: "Safari Adventure"; Story Time: "Pookie's Adventure"
| 43 | "Nature" | Biz Markie, Marissa Jaret Winokur, Paul Scheer, Jack McBrayer; Kids: Aidan Dveirin, Piper Steimle, Hudson Lyon | Scott Schultz, Joel Fox | Scott Schultz, Joel Fox | "Out in Nature" by Band of Horses | February 8, 2011 | Ross Harris |
The Gabba Gang go camping on Gabba Mountain. Songs: "We're Going Camping", "Story Song", "Flying in Nature"; Jingle: "The Great Outdoors" by The Decemberists; Biz's Beat of the Day; Knock-Knock Joke of the Day: "Leaf"; Story Time: "Ruby, Harper, Clyde"; Numbers: Leaves
| 44 | "Doctor" | Anthony Bourdain, Biz Markie; Kids: Jake Harvey, Sydney Hardie, Shane Robertson | Christian Jacobs | Christian Jacobs | "Bananas, Rice, Applesauce, Toast" by of Montreal | March 10, 2010 | Digital Unicorn |
Toodee has a cold! Songs: "Rest Up", "The Doctor", "Help Your Friends"; Jingle: "New Day" by Swound!; Biz's Beat of the Day; Numbers: Food, Not Food; Story Time: "Dr. Black & the Fruit Tree"
| 45 | "Flying" | Biz Markie, The Geeks: Martin Starr, Samm Levine, John Francis Daley; Kids: Eden Witten, Porter Buhrley, Brennan Tominaga | Scott Schultz | Jason deVilliers, Scott Schultz | "Fly Like a Bird" by Chairlift | August 4, 2010 | Cameron Webb |
Brobee really wants to fly, so his balloon friend, Balloony, takes him up in the sky and meet a unicorn and giraffe hybrid, Sparkles. Songs: "Let's Fly", "Friends Can Help", "Up, Up and Away"; Numbers: "The Red Balloon"; Biz's Beat of the Day; DJ Lance Dance: "The Whirlybird"; Dancey Dance: "The Flying Dancey Dance" with The Geeks (Martin, Samm, and John); Jingle: "Balloon Ride" by Super Furry Animals
| 46 | "Superhero" | Biz Markie, Mos Def; Kids: Analena Jacobs, Jack Shintaku, Sydney Soriano | Christian Jacobs | Christian Jacobs, Sarah Dyer, Evan Dorkin | "Watch Us Work It" by Devo | March 11, 2010 | Warren Fitzgerald |
The Gabba Gang become superheroes and after a star monster falls on Earth and starts scaring everyone, the Gabba Gang works together to scare it away. Songs: "Superhero", "Super Teamwork", "Super Good"; Jingle: "We are Superheroes" by Robert Schneider; Biz's Beat of the Day; Story Time: "Super Martian Robot Girl & the Yeti"; Numbers: "The Aquabats"
| 47 | "Circus" | "Weird Al" Yankovic, Mark Mothersbaugh, Jack McBrayer, Paul Scheer, Sarah Silverman; Kids: Whitley Pourhassanian, Kaydon Skinner, Sofie Landsman | Scott Schultz | Scott Schultz | "We Love Clowns" by Black Kids | March 8, 2010 | The Parallelograms |
A ringmaster (played by "Weird Al" Yankovic) doesn't have any circus performers for his circus, so the Gabba Gang help him out by being his circus performers. Songs: "Circus Parade", "I'm a Clown Now", "Here at the Circus"; Jingle: "Circus Town" by Mates of State; Dancey Dance: "The Mime Dancey Dance" with Sarah Silverman; Mark's Magic Pictures: Hoop; Knock-Knock Joke of the Day: "Lion"
| 48 | "Fairy Tale" | Mark Mothersbaugh (credited but does not appear), Jack McBrayer, Paul Scheer; Kids: Mia Fackrell, Sydney Burnham, Sharief Morrow | Matthew Fackrell | Scott Schultz, Matthew Fackrell | "Fairytale Song" by The Flaming Lips | November 5, 2010 | Kevin Sukho Lee |
DJ Lance Rock reads the Gabba Gang, Jack and the Beanstalk. Songs: "A Better Day", "Magic Beans", "A Magic Place", "I'm So Sorry"; Jingle: "Golden Goose Fairy Tale" by The Submarines; DJ Lance Dance: "Climb the Beanstalk"; Knock-Knock Joke of the Day: "Banana"; Note: "A Better Day" is credited as Performed by See Spot and Composed by Andrew Fackrell.
| 49 | "Clubhouse" | Mark Mothersbaugh, Erykah Badu; Kids: Harrison & Charlotte King, Puma Curry, Conrad Olivier-Meier, Dallin Leckey | Jason deVilliers | Jason deVilliers, Christian Jacobs | "Treehouse Party" by The Sounds | August 6, 2010 | Love Search |
Muno and Brobee build a clubhouse out of wood, but they wouldn't let Toodee and Foofa join them. So Toodee and Foofa decide to build their own clubhouse: a treehouse! Songs: "Building a Clubhouse", "Do Our Own Thing", "Everything is More Fun"; Numbers: Clubhouse; Jingle: "Help Your Friends" by DeVotchKa; Dancey Dance: "When I Feel Down" with Erykah Badu; Mark's Magic Pictures: Tools
| 50 | "Treasure" | Mark Mothersbaugh, Fred Armisen, Charlyne Yi; Kids: Clara Berrett, Ollie Schultz, Magnolia Hammel | Scott Schultz | Jordan Kim, Scott Schultz | "Treasure" by Blitzen Trapper | September 20, 2011 (Note: This episode was first released in Circus DVD on June 14, 2011.) | Classixx |
Two elves named Edith and Larry tell the Gabba Gang about a treasure hidden in Gabbaland. Songs: "Treasure is Anything", "Treasure Hunt", "Treasure Dance"; Jingle: "Treasure Hunt" by Camera Obscura; Mark's Magic Pictures: Treasure Chest; DJ Lance Dance: "Dig for Treasure"; Story Time: "The Farmer's Jewels"
| 51 | "Pets" | Rachel Jacobs, Mark Mothersbaugh, Rob Dyrdek; Kids: Cashel Gubernick, Alex & Gavin Monson, Sofie Arnold | Christian Jacobs | Christian Jacobs, Kevin Sukho Lee | "We All Love Our Pets" by Taking Back Sunday | August 8, 2010 | Adrian Michna |
Foofa gets a new pet, a cute little creature called a Mokicho, but it becomes a lot of work. Songs: "I Love My Pet", "That's What Friends Are For", "A Promise to My Pet"; Jingle: "My Special Friend" by The Pepper Pots; Mark's Magic Pictures: Guinea pig; Dancey Dance: "The Rolly Polly" with Rob Dyrdek; Story Time: "Clyde and Harry"
| 52 | "Baby" | Mark Mothersbaugh; Kids: Brooklyn & McKenna Barlow, Kawika Jensen, Tikoa Tafua | Christian Jacobs | Christian Jacobs, Parker Jacobs | "Mama Loves Baby" by Solange Knowles | May 7, 2010 | D.J. Sifa |
The Gabba Gang learn about babies. Songs: "We Were All Babies", "Babies Need Our Help", "Give Baby Some Space"; Jingle: "Little Baby" by Hunter Revenge; Mark's Magic Pictures: Eggs in a Nest; Numbers: "Five"; Story Time: "Naming Baby"
| 53 | "Bugs" | Mix Master Mike, Mark Mothersbaugh; Kids: Sebastian Sartirana, Cricket Jacobs, Joei & Sofia Duran | Christian Jacobs | Christian Jacobs, Sarah Dyer, Evan Dorkin | "All My Friends Are Insects" by Weezer | March 9, 2010 | Travis Barker |
The Gabba Gang learn about insects. Songs: "I Love Bugs", "Follow the Oskie Bugs", "Eggs"; Jingle: "Bugs Are A Curious Fellow" by Black Moth Super Rainbow; Mark's Magic Pictures: Ant Farm; Cool Tricks: Mix Master Mike performs a DJ Mix; Story Time: "Buzzy the Bee"

=== Season 4: 2011–15 ===
Season four was cleared for production in March 2011. A number of unreleased episodes have been referred to by online sources. Nick Jr's website hosted clips from a number of them as well. Four episodes were first broadcast in January 2015.

| Prod. code | Title | Credited guests | Directed by | Written by | Super Music Friends Show | Original release date | Closing remix |
|---|---|---|---|---|---|---|---|
| 54 | "Gooble" | Greg Hawkes, Biz Markie, Mark Mothersbaugh, The Pains of Being Pure At Heart; Kids: Avery Morley, Isaac Morales, Jasper Zeibarth, Bruce Jacobs | Christian Jacobs | Christian Jacobs, Sean Mortimer, Jason deVilliers | "Friends Can Make You Smile" by The Bronx | October 28, 2012 | Digital Unicorn, Choiboy Fleuesmith |
The Gabba Gang decides to cheer Gooble up by throwing a spooky costume party. Songs: "Cheer Up", "Welcome to Gooble Land (Don't Be Scared)"; Jingle: "Everyone is Happy" by The Pains of Being Pure at Heart; Mark's Magic Pictures: Spooky Ghost; DJ Lance Dance: "The Happy Zombie"; Story Time: "Calm Down"; Musicians Who Like to Play: Keyboards with Greg Hawkes
| 55 | "DJ Lance's Super Music and Toy Room" | Paul Scheer, Jack McBrayer, Leslie Hall, Erykah Badu, Bootsy Collins, Questlove, Kemba Russell, Biz Markie, Mark Mothersbaugh | Scott Schultz | Scott Schultz, Kevin Lee, Lance Robertson | "Home" by DJ Lance and Papas Fritas | December 7, 2013 | Kevin S. Lee |
After DJ Lance Rock sees that the star on his hat is missing, he goes back to his super music and toy room to find it. Songs: "Ask If You Can Pick it Up", "Look Around", "We're Going to Party Today"; Knock-Knock Joke of the Day: "Boo" and "No One"; Biz's Beat of the Day; Mark's Magic Pictures: Magic Star; Jingle: "Birds" by Erykah Badu and James Pants Note: Unique show opening and titles
| 56 | "A Very Awesome Christmas Special" | Tori Spelling, Tony Hawk, Leslie Hall, Mark Mothersbaugh, Madelyn, Brian, and the Band; Kids: Kai Sablan, Paige & Syd Hoke | Christian Jacobs, Matt Chapman | Christian Jacobs, Scott Schultz, Matt Chapman, Mike Chapman | "Hot Chocolate" by Madelyn, Brian, and the Band and "Every Snowflake's Different" by My Chemical Romance | December 18, 2011 | Tyger Ryder, Coyboy Fleuesmith |
The Gabba Gang celebrates Christmas, but they couldn't think of any present to give Santa Claus. Songs: "Ready for Christmas", "Make it Yourself", "Holiday Lights"; Jingle: "To Give a Present" by James Husband; Story Time: "Douglas the Christmas Tree"; Madelyn, Brian, and the Band perform "Hot Chocolate"; DJ Lance and The Gabbaland Choir perform "Christmas is Upon Us" Note: Unique show opening and titles
| 57 | "Show" | Josh Freese; Kids: Bonnie Hoke, William Barron | Christian Jacobs, Matt Chapman | Christian Jacobs, Scott Schultz, Matt Chapman, Mike Chapman | Various from Five Previous Episodes ("Just Because It's Different Doesn't Mean It's Scary" by I'm From Barcelona (from Differences), "Mama Loves Baby" by Solange Knowles (from Baby), "Spaceship Adventure" by The Killers (from Adventure), "It's O.K., Try Again" by The Shins (from Imagine), and "Lovely, Love My Family" by The Roots (from Family)) | November 9, 2015 | None |
DJ Lance Rock and the Gabba Gang are invited to the Swami's super music friends show. Cool Tricks: Josh Freese plays drums and eats lunch at the same time; Jingle: "Everybody Has A Talent (Instrumental)" by Metric; DJ Lance Dance: "The Dance Machine"
| 58 | "Mermaids" | Kate Micucci as Tammy The Mermaid, Mark Mothersbaugh; Guest Voices: Slick Rick as Turbo, Justin Roiland as Sea Queen; Kids: Eddie Rodriguez, Melody Curtis, Clyde Berrett, Tyler Russell | Scott Schultz, Julia Vickerman | Scott Schultz, Julia Vickerman | "Dance Floor on the Sand" by Yelle | November 11, 2015 | Digital Unicorn |
After Foofa accidentally drops her doll into a pond, she and Toodee meet a mermaid named Tammy (played by Kate Micucci). Together they go to the Mer-kingdom (where Tammy lives) to find Foofa's doll. Songs: "Swim, Swim, Swim", "Just the Same", "Undersea Dance Contest"; Story Time: "Harris & Toby"; Mark's Magic Pictures: "Little Fish Guy", Numbers: "Undersea Friends", Jingle: "Mermaid, Will You Rescue Me?" by Memoryhouse
| 59 | "Olympics" | Bill Hader, Metta World Peace, Diamond World Peace, Biz Markie, Kayla Kalisz; Kids: Kumaka Jensen, Dane Peterson, Olivia & Isabella Greenbaum, Mazzy Immegart | Christian Jacobs, Tyler Jacobs | Christian Jacobs, Tyler Jacobs | "Fantastic Voyages" by Cut Copy | August 19, 2012 | Nowonder |
The Gabba Gang start their own Olympics. Songs: "We Can Do Anything", "Gabba Land National Anthem", "Yo Gabba-lympics", "We Are All Winners"; Jingle: "The Clapping Song" by Bibio; Biz's Beat of the Day; Dancey Dance: "The Rainbow Drop" with Bill Hader; Cool Tricks: Kayla Kalisz performs Acrobatics
| 60 | "Shopping" | Anne Heche, Greg Hawkes, Mark Mothersbaugh; Kids: Caleb Caballero, Dylan Arrighi, Finlee Mills, Annabelle & Lillian Williams | Matt Chapman, Mike Chapman | Matt Chapman, Mike Chapman, Bryce Clark, Jason deVilliers | "Supermarket Shuffle" by Inara George and Scottsdale Or Yacht | January 3, 2015 | DJ Game Kidd |
After Plex runs out of the ingredients he needs to make pancakes, he and the Gabba Gang go to the supermarket to get more. Songs: "Let's All Make a List", "Stick Together", "If You Break It, You Buy It"; Jingle: "Pancakes & Syrup" by Biz Markie; Mark's Magic Pictures: "Bag of Groceries"; Cool Tricks: Greg Hawkes plays the ukulele; DJ Lance Dance: "The Shopping Cart", Story Time: "Stubbins & The Beets"
| 61 | "Super Spies" | Jason Bateman as Bateman (The Bad Spy); Kids: Barrett Windes, Jacob Vargas, Harper Schultz, Ruby Schultz | Scott Schultz, Craig Windes | Scott Schultz, Craig Windes | “I'm the Bad Spy” by Jason Bateman and “I Wish I Was A Spy” by Peter Bjorn and John | June 22, 2013 (Note: This episode was first released in Super Spies DVD on April 17, 2012.) | Matt Gorney |
After a bad spy (played by Jason Bateman) steals the balloon art from the Gabba Gang's balloon art party, the Gabba Gang become super spies and stop the bad spy and get their balloon art back. Songs: "One of the Good Spies", "Chasing Down the Bad Spy", "Balloon Party"; Jingle: "Amazing Disguise" by Stars; Story Time: "Ian the Spy"; Spying Numbers; Note: DVD release: April 17, 2012
| 62 | "Dinosaur" | Patton Oswalt, Mark Mothersbaugh, Jack McBrayer, Paul Scheer; Kids: Brynn Orgill, Maiya Galloway, Marc Cohen, Roxy & Harrison Quealy | Christian Jacobs, Brent Johnson | Christian Jacobs, Brent Johnson | "Dinosaur Party" by Edward Sharpe and the Magnetic Zeros | January 3, 2015 | James Pants |
Muno, Brobee, and Toodee visit the land of the dinosaurs. Songs: "Dinosaurs are Really Really", "Plants or Meat", "Sleepytime"; Jingles: "Dinosaur" by CSS and "Atomic Frogs" by George Clinton; Mark's Magic Pictures: "Tyrannosaurus Rex"; Dancey Dance: "The Caveman Kaboom" with Patton Oswalt; Knock-Knock Joke of the Day: "Ice Cream"; DJ Lance Dance: "The T. Rex Stomp"
| 63 | "Restaurant" | Busy Philipps, Steve, Caleb, and Kayla Caballero, Tom Lennon; Kids: Charlie Falomir, Heidi & Susie Struhs, Ace & Rio Dumont | Matthew Fackrell, Tyler Jacobs | Tyler Jacobs | "He's a Chef" by Rocket from the Crypt | January 10, 2015 | Cutmaster Cool (aka, Vaughan Lee) & Everett (E-Plugg) Ramos |
The Gabba Gang goes to a restaurant. Songs: "Choices", "Let's Be Awesome While We Wait", "Mind Our Manners"; Jingle: "Gimmie, Gimmie, Gimmie" by Toro y Moi; Cool Tricks: Steve, Caleb, and Kayla Caballero Balancing Toothpicks; DJ Lance Dance: "The Noodle Twirl"; Story Time: "Amazing Restaurant"
| 64 | "Quest" | Jeffrey Tambor, Mark Mothersbaugh; Kids: Ollie Schultz, Regan Lennon, Brad Bochman, Sailor Steimle | Scott Schultz, Jordan Kim | Jordan Kim, Scott Schultz | "We Learn From Our Mistakes" by Neon Indian | November 12, 2015 | Daedelus |
The Gabba Gang head to a medieval village to help a king regain order in his kingdom. They become friends with a naughty dragon bully named Carl. Songs: "You Can Do It", "Don't Listen to the Bullies", "Anything for My Friends", Jingle: "You Can Do It" by Belle and Sebastian; Story Time: "Dragon Bully"; Mark's Magic Pictures: "Dragon"; Note: This is the series finale in airing order.
| 65 | "Farm" | Josh Holloway as Farmer Josh, The High Llamas; Kids: Mikey McCullough, Chandler Green, Luke Odgen, Ryan & Taylen Crandall | Matthew Fackrell, Nathan Fackrell | Scott Schultz, Matthew Fackrell, Nathan Fackrell | "When You're a Gardener" by Dr. Dog | July 27, 2013 | Mossi Watene, Ryan Augustine |
The Gabba Gang start their own farm. Songs: "On the Farm", "Mother Nature"; Jingle: "Living on a Farm" by The High Llamas; Funny Face: Freestyle; Dancey Dance: "The Super Sizzlin' Ho Down Party Dance" with Farmer Josh; Story Time: "Sally the Dog"
| 66 | "Day Camp" | Matthew Gray Gubler, Kemba Russell, Todd Oldham, Jack McBrayer, Paul Scheer, Biz Markie, Marissa Jaret Winokur Peyton & Megan Steen; Kids: Finn & Franco Windes, Nora & Hazel Wolfgramm, Ziggy & Rowan Watene, Lottie & Daniel Drozd | Scott Schultz | Scott Schultz, Craig Windes | "We Have Fun" by The Roots | January 10, 2015 | Cameron Webb |
The Gabba Gang go to day camp. Songs: "The Who am I? Game", "Follow the Leader", "We are a Family, We are a Team"; Jingle: "Going to Day Camp" by Rocketship; Biz's Beat of the Day; Knock-Knock Joke of the Day: Alligator; DJ Lance Dance: "The Canoe Ride"; Craft Time: T-Shirts with Todd Oldham; Cool Tricks: Peyton & Megan Steen Performing the Pattern, "Boom, Snap, Clap"

== Yo Gabba GabbaLand! ==
=== Season 1 (2024–26) ===
| No. | Title | Original release date | Prod. code |
|---|---|---|---|
| 1 | "Land" | August 9, 2024 | 101 |
| 2 | "Silly" | August 9, 2024 | 102 |
| 3 | "Air" | August 9, 2024 | 103 |
| 4 | "Little" | August 9, 2024 | 104 |
| 5 | "Home" | January 30, 2026 | 105 |
| 6 | "Me" | August 9, 2024 | 106 |
| 7 | "Light" | January 30, 2026 | 107 |
| 8 | "Grow" | August 9, 2024 | 108 |
| 9 | "Food" | January 30, 2026 | 109 |
| 10 | "Water" | August 9, 2024 | 110 |
| 11 | "Thanks" | January 30, 2026 | 111 |
| 12 | "New" | January 30, 2026 | 112 |
| 13 | "Help" | January 30, 2026 | 113 |
| 14 | "Body" | January 30, 2026 | 114 |
| 15 | "Make" | August 9, 2024 | 115 |
| 16 | "Wonder" | August 9, 2024 | 116 |
| 17 | "Try" | January 30, 2026 | 117 |
| 18 | "Outside" | August 9, 2024 | 118 |
| 19 | "Play" | January 30, 2026 | 119 |
| 20 | "Go" | January 30, 2026 | 120 |
