= LaVorgna =

LaVorgna is a surname. Notable people with the surname include:

- Adam LaVorgna (born 1981), American actor
- Bill LaVorgna (1933–2007), American jazz musician and music director
