= Jonathan Phillip Wilkins =

American musician and record producer (born 1971)

J. Phillip Wilkins
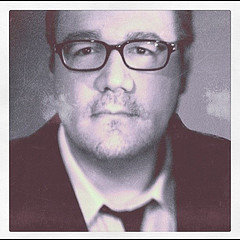

Background information
- Origin: Miami, Florida, United States
- Genres: Pop, indie rock, alternative rock, dub reggae, film music
- Occupations: Record producer, songwriter, engineer, screenwriter, film director
- Instruments: Drums, multi-instrumentalist
- Years active: 1993–present
- Formerly of: The Postmarks

J. Phillip Wilkins is an American record producer, singer-songwriter, multi-instrumentalist, composer and screenwriter. He is originally from Miami, Florida, currently residing in Los Angeles, California, and is a member of the band The Postmarks, which is currently on an indefinite hiatus. He has released two albums with The Postmarks, along with a covers album and an EP.

Wilkins worked for several supermarket tabloids from 1993 to 2005, including the Sun, Globe and Weekly World News. He filled various positions such as art director, writer, and production manager. He was at the Sun tabloid when several anthrax-filled letters were sent to the offices of American Media Inc. days after the September 11 attacks.

In 1997, Wilkins moved to San Francisco and worked for the Pacifica Tribune, and then trade magazine M Business. He played briefly in the indie rock trio Peachum.

He returned to South Florida in 2001 and became active in the burgeoning local music scene, playing and recording with several artists including Summer Blanket, The Freakin' Hott, Helen Horal, The Brite Side, I Am Stereo, John Ralston, See Venus and finally, The Postmarks.

Wilkins currently writes screenplays and composes for films.

== Discography ==
- (2003) Summer Blanket — "Charm Wrestling" — Pop Up Records – Producer, Drums, Bass, Keyboards
- (2004) Helen Horal — "There Is Only This Place" — Producer, Drums, Bass, Guitar, Keyboards, Package Design
- (2005) Summer Blanket — "Whisper Louder" — Pop Up Records – Producer, Drums, Bass, Keyboards
- (2005) The Brite Side — "Every Night's Another Story" — Producer, Drums, Guitar, Keyboards
- (2006) The Freakin' Hott — "Slip on the Lips" — Producer, Drums
- (2006) The Postmarks — "Remix EP" – Unfiltered Records
- (2007) John Ralston — "Sorry Vampire" — Vagrant Records – Co-Producer, Drums, Keyboards
- (2007) I Am Stereo — "EP" — Co-Producer, Guitar, Keyboards, Vibraphone, Background Vocal
- (2007) The Postmarks — The Postmarks — Unfiltered Records – Co-Producer, Drums, Bass, Keyboards
- (2008) The Postmarks — By The Numbers — Unfiltered Records – Co-Producer, Drums, Bass, Guitar, Keyboards
- (2009) The Postmarks — Memoirs at the End of the World — Unfiltered Records – Co-Producer, Drums, Bass, Guitar, Keyboards, Arrangements, Mixing, songwriter
- (2011) The Neverendings – Here & Now – Drums, Guitar, Keyboards

== Filmography ==
- (2003) One Fine Morning – Composer
- (2005) The Imperial Message – Actor
- (2007) The Flyer – Composer, Sound design
- (2007) The Postmarks "Know Which Way The Wind Blows" — Music video – Director
- (2008) The Postmarks "11:59" — Music video – Director
- (2009) The Postmarks "Looks Like Rain" — Music video – Director
