= There Is a Song =

There is a Song

Studio album by The Free Design
- Released: 1972
- Genre: Sunshine pop, baroque pop
- Length: 36:47
- Label: Ambrotype

The Free Design chronology
One By One (1971)	There is a Song (1972)	Cosmic Peekaboo (2001)

Professional ratings
Review scores
Source	Rating
Allmusic	3.5/5 stars

There is a Song is the seventh album from The Free Design, released in 1972. After feeling that they had reached a dead end with their albums on the Project 3 label, they left to record for a smaller label in upstate New York called Ambrotype. The album also coincided with Chris Dedrick's move from Maryland to Toronto, where he and his sisters, who comprised the rest of the group, were mentored by Canadian musician and philosopher Kenneth G. Mills. Some tracks were recorded in Rochester and some in Toronto. It was the last album the group recorded until Cosmic Peekaboo nearly 30 years later, and was extremely rare until its reissue on CD by Light in the Attic Records.

== Track listing ==
1. "Canada in Springtime" (Chris Dedrick)
2. "Kum Ba Yah" (Traditional)
3. "Peter, Paul and Mary" (Chris Dedrick)
4. "Pineapple, Crabapple" (Sandra Zynczak/John Hoover)
5. "The Symbols Ring" (Chris Dedrick)
6. "Stay" (Ellen Dedrick Griffin)
7. "I Wanna Be There" (Chris Dedrick)
8. "There is a Song" (Chris Dedrick)
9. "A Child is Born"
10. "Love Does Not Die" (Chris Dedrick)
11. "Chorale" (Chris Dedrick)
12. "Fugue" (Chris Dedrick)
