= Cosmic Peekaboo =

Studio album by The Free Design
- Released: 2001
- Genre: Sunshine pop
- Label: Marina

The Free Design chronology
There Is a Song (1972)	Cosmic Peekaboo (2001)	The Now Sound Redesigned (2005)

Cosmic Peekaboo is the eighth album by The Free Design. Released in 2001, it was the sunshine pop group's first album after a long hiatus.

The album features original members—and siblings—Sandy, Chris and Bruce Dedrick, along with Rebecca Pellett.

== Track listing ==
1. Peekaboo
2. Younger Son
3. McCarran Airport
4. Destiny
5. Springtime
6. Listen
7. The Hook
8. Music Room
9. The Only Treasure
10. Day Breaks
11. Perfect Love

== Personnel ==
- Chris Dedrick – vocals, soprano recorder, keyboards, recorder, piano, flugelhorn, percussion, trumpet, Native American drum, rhythm guitar, arranger, producer
- Bruce Dedrick – vocals
- Sandy Dedrick – vocals
- Rebecca Pellett – vocals, keyboards
- Tom Szczesniak – piano, bass
- Stefan Szczesniak – drums
- Christian Szczesniak – guitar, acoustic guitar
- John Johnson – soprano sax
- Brian Barlow – percussion, cocktail drums
- Mike Francis – guitar
- David Swan – piano
- Marie Bérard – violin
- Griffin Dedrick – guitar
- Douglas Perry – viola
- Brian Epperson – cello
