= Heaven/Earth =

Studio album by The Free Design
- Released: August 1969
- Genre: Jazz/Pop
- Label: Project 3
- Producer: Enoch Light

The Free Design chronology
You Could Be Born Again (1968)	Heaven/Earth (1969)	Stars/Time/Bubbles/Love (1970)

Heaven/Earth is the third album from The Free Design, released in 1969. It was produced by Enoch Light for his Project 3 label.

== Track listing ==
All songs were written by Chris Dedrick except where otherwise noted.

1. "My Very Own Angel"
2. "Now Is The Time"
3. "If I Were a Carpenter" (Tim Hardin)
4. "You Be You and I'll Be Me"
5. "Girls Alone"
6. "2002 - A Hit Song"
7. "Summertime" (George Gershwin/Ira Gershwin/DuBose Heyward)
8. "Where Do I Go" (Galt MacDermot/James Rado/Gerome Ragni)
9. "Hurry Sundown" (Earl Robinson/Yip Harburg)
10. "Memories" (Billy Strange/Mac Davis)
11. "Dorian Benediction"
