= ...Sing for Very Important People =

Studio album by The Free Design
- Released: 1970
- Genre: Pop
- Label: Project 3 Total Sound
- Producer: Enoch Light

The Free Design chronology
Stars/Time/Bubbles/Love (1970)	...Sing for Very Important People (1970)	One By One (1971)

...Sing for Very Important People is a 1970 album by The Free Design. It was the band's fifth album. The album was a children's album, inspired in part by Peter, Paul and Mary's album Peter, Paul and Mommy of the previous year. ...Sing for Very Important People included a combination of original songs, covers, and a number of songs that had appeared on the band's previous albums: "Bubbles", "Daniel Dolphin" and "Kites Are Fun". "Little Cowboy" was written by Arthur Dedrick, father of most of the band's members.

The song "Love You" began to achieve increased popularity around 2006, when it was used in the closing credits of the film Stranger than Fiction. In subsequent years, it was used in commercials for Drumstick ice cream in Australia, Smil chocolate in Norway, Cosmote in Greece, DC Shoes and Toyota, among others, as well as on the television show Weeds, and as the theme for the podcast Jordan, Jesse GO!. In 2015, the song was used in a commercial for Delta Air Lines, and in 2022 for a Zillow commercial.

== Track listing ==
1. Don't Cry, Baby (Chris Dedrick)
2. Can You Tell Me How to Get to Sesame Street? (Joe Raposo, Jon Stone and Bruce Hart)
3. Children's Waltz
4. Scarlet Tree
5. Little Cowboy (Art Dedrick)
6. Love You (Sandy Dedrick Zynczak and Joe Zynczak)
7. Ronda Go Round (Ellen Dedrick)
8. Bubbles (Chris Dedrick)
9. Daniel Dolphin (Chris Dedrick)
10. Kites Are Fun (Chris Dedrick)
11. Lullaby (Sandy Dedrick Zynczak)
