= You Could Be Born Again =

Studio album by The Free Design
- Released: 1968
- Genres: Jazz, pop
- Label: Project 3
- Producer: Enoch Light

The Free Design chronology
Kites Are Fun (1967)	You Could Be Born Again (1968)	Heaven/Earth (1969)

You Could Be Born Again is the second album by The Free Design; it was released in 1968. It is the band's first album as a quartet, with the members' sister Ellen Dedrick added to the lineup.

== Track listing ==
1. "You Could Be Born Again"
2. "A Leaf Has Veins"
3. "California Dreamin'"
4. "The Windows of the World"
5. "Eleanor Rigby"
6. "Quartet No. 6 in D Minor"
7. "I Like the Sunrise"
8. "I Found Love"
9. "Daniel Dolphin"
10. "Happy Together"
11. "Ivy on a Windy Day"
12. "An Elegy"

== Bonus Tracks ==
Overseas Records (Japan) 1998 reissue:

1. "The Proper Ornaments (Mono Mix)"

Light in the Attic Records 2004 reissue:

1. "Close Your Mouth (It's Christmas)"
2. "Christmas is the Day"

== Personnel ==
- Bruce Dedrick - vocals, guitar
- Chris Dedrick - vocals, guitar
- Ellen Dedrick - vocals
- Sandra Dedrick - vocals, keyboards
- Stefanie Dedrick – vocals
- Jay Berliner - guitar
- Ralph Casale - guitar
- Al Casamenti - guitar
- Tony Mottola - guitar
- Bucky Pizzarelli - guitar
- Russ Savakus - bass
- Paul Griffin - keyboards
- Dick Hyman - keyboards
- George Devens - percussion
- Phil Kraus - percussion
- Bill LaVorgna - percussion
- Bob Papaleoni - percussion
- Joe Venuto - percussion
- Earl Chopin - French horn
- Ray Alonge - French horn
- Tony Miranda - French horn
- Rusty Dedrick - trumpet
- John Frosk - trumpet
- Harold Lieberman - trumpet
- Paul Faulise - trombone
- Urbie Green - trombone
- Buddy Morrow - trombone
- Harvey E. Phillips - tuba
- Joe Palmer - woodwind
- Romeo Penque - woodwind
- Joe Soldo - woodwind
- Stan Webb - woodwind
- Julius Schacter - violin
- George Ricci - cello
- Harvey Shapiro - cello
