= Lance Robertson =

American musician

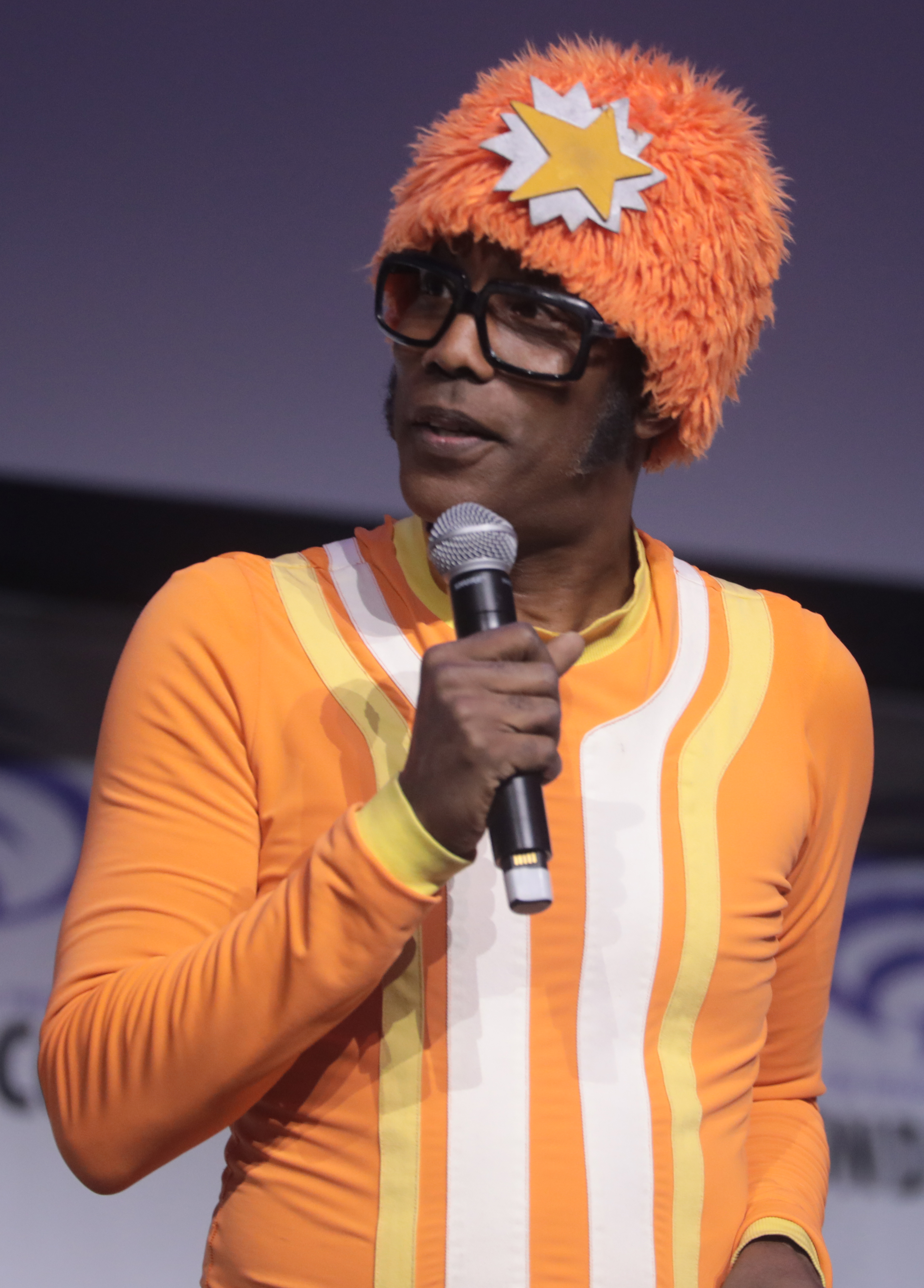
- Robertson at the 2023 WonderCon

Background information
- Born: April 5 St. Louis, Missouri, U.S.
- Genre: Children's music
- Occupations: Musician; singer; actor; author
- Instruments: Guitar; keyboards; vocals
- Years active: 2006–present
- Label: Nickelodeon

Lance Robertson (born April 5) is an American musician, singer, DJ and actor best known for the Nick Jr. kids' animated, puppet/musical television show Yo Gabba Gabba!, where he plays DJ Lance Rock. He was nominated for two NAACP Image Awards.

== Life and career ==
Originally from St. Louis, Robertson graduated from Hazelwood East High School in 1983. He was the vocalist for a local electronic band called My Other Self during the 1990s and the owner of a record store called Deep Grooves!

Robertson later relocated to Los Angeles, California. During this time, he was in the band the Ray Makers. He later met Scott Schultz of the Orange County indie pop band Majestic. They eventually played a couple of shows together. Years later, when Schultz was co-creating the show Yo Gabba Gabba!, Robertson was asked to serve as host DJ Lance Rock.

== Filmography ==
=== Film ===
Year	Title	Role	Note
2006	Yo Gabba Gabba!	DJ Lance Rock	Host
2010	Nickelodeon Mega Music Fest	DJ Lance Rock	
2011	Patti Down the Rabbit Hole	Mad Hatter	Short movie
2013	I Am Divine	—N/a	Producer
2021	The Sparks Brothers	Himself	
2022	Toomie: The Hungry Tumor	Bradford	

=== Television ===
Year	Title	Role	Note
2007–2015	Yo Gabba Gabba!	DJ Lance Rock	Main role; host
2010	True Jackson, VP	DJ Lance Rock	Episode: "Trapped in Paris"
2010–2011	Late Night with Jimmy Fallon	DJ Lance Rock	2 episodes; Episode: "September 1, 2010" (uncredited); Episodes: "October 10, 2011"
2012	The Fresh Beat Band	DJ Lance Rock	Episode: "Yo! Fresh Beats Go Gabba Gabba!"
2013	In the Night Castle...	DJ Lance Rock	Episode: "Nick Jr. Royal Party"
2019	Be Safe with Yo Gabba Gabba!	DJ Lance Rock	TV miniseries

== Awards and nominations ==
Year	Nominee / work	Award	Result	Ref.
2011	Himself	NAACP Image Award for Outstanding Performance in a Youth/Children’s Program (Series or Special)	Nominated	
2012	Himself	NAACP Image Award for Outstanding Performance in a Youth/Children’s Program (Series or Special)	Nominated	
