= Bill LaVorgna =

American jazz musician and music director

- Born: William A. LaVorgna; June 3, 1933; Paterson, New Jersey, U.S.
- Died: July 31, 2007 (aged 74) Stuart, Florida, U.S.
- Genres: Jazz, pop, folk, soul, rhythm and blues, country, American standards
- Occupations: Musician (drums), musical director
- Years active: 1950s–2000s

William A. LaVorgna (1933–2007) was an American traditional pop and jazz musician (drums) who for many years was musical director for American actress, dancer and singer, Liza Minnelli.

== Life and work ==
LaVorgna took up the drums as a child. He attended Paterson Central High School, from which he graduated in 1951. He then studied at New York University, where he earned degrees in music education and music.

According to his wife, LaVorgna was never without work as a studio musician, having performed in an estimated 10,000 recording sessions over his career. His first recordings were made in the early 1960s with jazz guitarist Tony Mottola. Beginning with Pat Boone, LaVorgna began a long career in the pop music field, working with singers such as Eddie Fisher, Bobby Darin, Judy Garland, James Brown, the Four Seasons, and The Toys, ringing up 19 million-sellers and many number one records.

In the field of jazz LaVorgna was involved in 35 recording sessions between 1961 and 1987. He performed with Sam Most, Stan Free, Toots Thielemans, Phil Woods, Spanky McFarlane, Marvin Stamm, Patrick Williams, Gary McFarland, and Paul Desmond. In the 1970s he also recorded with Gary Burton, Urbie Green, Joe Thomas, Kimiko Kasai, Bobby Scott, Barbara Carroll, and Ralph Burns. LaVorgna won two jazz Grammys with Gary Burton and Patrick Williams.

With Ted Sommer, LaVorgna released two easy-listening LPs in 1961.

== Career with Liza Minnelli ==
Lifelong friends, LaVorgna served as musical director for Liza Minnelli for more than 30 years.

The two first met in the mid-50s when Minnelli was a child and he was under contract to her mother, Judy Garland. LaVorgna worked with Garland in her 1961 Carnegie Hall appearance and her 1963 television series.

One of LaVorgna's earliest live collaborations with Minnelli was a week-long engagement at the Latin Casino in Cherry Hill, New Jersey, in January 1977. They previously had worked together on her soundtrack for the 1977 motion picture "New York, New York."

LaVorgna went on to serve as Minnelli's exclusive musical director and conductor from 1978 through 1999. For Minnelli's September 1979 Carnegie Hall appearance, musical director Lavorgna was described by John S. Wilson in his New York Times review of the concert as "a dynamic drummer who presided from the upper regions of the stage, casting down percussive commandments like a musical Moses."

Other LaVorgna credits include Minnelli's 1986 concert at the London Palladium; her three-week concert series at Carnegie Hall in May–June 1987; the 1991 celebration of the 60th anniversary of the Greek Theatre in Los Angeles with her "splashy, fun-filled show," "Stepping Out"; her 1992 performance at Radio City Music Hall; the 1993 television special "The Day After That"; and "Minnelli on Minnelli," her concert that ran at the Palace Theatre on Broadway from December 8, 1999, through January 2, 2000.

LaVorgna retired in 2000, but returned to work with Minnelli as her drummer and musical conductor in 2002.

Over the period spanning a half-century, LaVorgna was said to have become a true member of Minnelli's family. Minnelli claims she and LaVorgna developed a fast friendship when he espied her, at age 13, driving her mother's car around Las Vegas and smoking, and yet he never told on her. The episode remained their secret, and they became best friends. She nicknamed him "Pappy." Once when Minnelli played Atlantic City, the casino arranged for her to stay in a home on the water near the hotel. She had "Pappy" stay in one of the guest rooms. In March 2002, LaVorgna escorted Minnelli down the aisle for her wedding to David Gest.

In 2008, the year following LaVorgna's death, Minnelli appeared in a month-long concert at the Palace Theatre, "Liza's at The Palace....." Her performances were dedicated "in loving memory of Bill ‘Pappy' LaVorgna."

== Personal ==
LaVorgna was a veteran of the Korean War. A New Jersey native, he lived in Princess Anne on the Eastern Shore of Maryland for twenty years, where he raised and trained sporting dogs. Prior to that, he and his family lived in Walton, New York, and Sussex, New Jersey. He was living in Stuart, Florida, with his wife of 54 years, Joan, at the time of his death in 2007.

== Discography ==
- Dancing Percussion Music of the 30's - Ted Mazio Percussion Group, Ted Sommer, Bill LaVorgna (1961)
- Cole Porter in Pleasing Percussion - Ted Sommer & Bill LaVorgna (1961)
- The Corporation: a "sound" contemporary musical investment - Vinnie Bell, Dick Hyman, Phil Bodner, Bucky Pizzarelli, Russ Savakus, Bill Lavorgna (1968)

== Selected album credits ==
- Judy Garland: Judy at Carnegie Hall (1961)
- Laura Nyro: More Than A New Discovery (1967)
- The Free Design: Kites Are Fun (1967)
- The Free Design: You Could Be Born Again (1968)
- The Brass Ring: The Now Sound Of The Brass Ring (1968)
- The Brass Ring: Only Love (1969)
- Spanky and Our Gang: Like To Get To Know You (1968)
- Jerry Jeff Walker: Mr. Bojangles (1968)
- Pat Williams: Shades of Today (1968)
- Pat Williams: Think (1968)
- Pat Williams: Heavy Vibrations (1969)
- Paul Desmond: Bridge Over Troubled Water (1969)
- Dick Hyman: The Age of Electronicus (1969)
- Richie Havens: Stonehenge (1970)
- Tony Mottola: Tony Mottola's Guitar Factory (1970)
- Enoch Light & The Light Brigade: Permissive Polyphonics (1971)
- Barry Manilow: Barry Manilow II (1974)
- Original Motion Picture Score: New York, New York (1977)
- Original Soundtrack The Wiz (1978)
- Liza Minnelli: Live at Carnegie Hall (1981)
- Liza Minnelli: At Carnegie Hall (1987)
- Liza Minnelli: Live from Radio City Music Hall (1992)
