= Kites Are Fun =

Studio album by The Free Design
- Released: 6 April 1967
- Recorded: 1967
- Genres: Sunshine pop, baroque pop
- Length: 42:12
- Label: Project 3
- Producer: Enoch Light

The Free Design chronology
Kites Are Fun (1967)	You Could Be Born Again (1968)

Professional ratings
Review scores
Source	Rating
Allmusic	4/5 stars
Crawdaddy!	(favorable)

Kites Are Fun is the first album by The Free Design, released in 1967. The group was signed to the Project 3 label after a demo recording that was completed with the assistance of the band's father.

The tracks are composed of precise instrumental arrangements with high ranges in complex vocal harmonies. The title track was the group's only charting single, reaching #33 on the Billboard adult contemporary chart and #114 on the Billboard Hot 100/Bubbling Under chart.

== Track listing ==
1. "Kites Are Fun" (Chris Dedrick)
2. "Make the Madness Stop" (Chris Dedrick)
3. "When Love is Young" (Sandy Dedrick/Stephanie Dedrick)
4. "The Proper Ornaments" (Chris Dedrick)
5. "My Brother Woody" (Chris Dedrick)
6. "59th Street Bridge Song" (Paul Simon)
7. "Don't Turn Away" (Chris Dedrick)
8. "Umbrellas" (Bruce Dedrick)
9. "Michelle" (Lennon–McCartney)
10. "Never Tell the World" (Sandy Dedrick/Chris Dedrick)
11. "A Man and a Woman" (Francis Lai)
12. "Stay Another Season" (Chris Dedrick)

The title track, released as a single, was on Billboard's "Bubbling Under Hot 100" and "Top 40 Easy Listening" surveys.

== Charts ==
The title track, released as a single, was on Billboard's "Bubbling Under Hot 100" and "Top 40 Easy Listening" surveys.

- "Kites Are Fun" (song)
  - Billboard Top 40 Easy Listening (adult contemporary) chart: #33
  - Billboard pop chart: #114

== Personnel ==
- Bruce Dedrick - vocals, guitar
- Chris Dedrick - vocals, guitar
- Sandra Dedrick - vocals, keyboards
- Russ Savakus - Fender bass guitar
- Bill LaVorgna - drums
- Ralph Casale - guitar
- Jay Berliner - guitar
- Tony Mottola - guitar
- Marvin Stamm - trumpet
- Ted Weiss - trumpet
- Joe Wilder - trumpet
- Rusty Dedrick - trumpet
- Bernie Glow - trumpet
- Buddy Morrow - trombone
- Ray Alonge - French horn
- Tony Miranda - French horn
- George Ricci - cello
- Romeo Penque - woodwind
- Ray Beckenstein - woodwind
- Phil Bodner - woodwind
- Stanley Webb - woodwind
- Paul Griffin - organ
- Dick Hyman - organ
- Stan Freeman - harpsichord
- Bobby Rosengarden - vibraphone

"Kites are Fun" was covered by Tomorrow's World for the Songs for the Jet Set, Volume 1 compilation album.
