= Stars/Time/Bubbles/Love =

Studio album by The Free Design
- Released: May 1970
- Genre: Pop
- Label: Project 3 Total Sound
- Producer: Chris Dedrick

The Free Design chronology
Heaven/Earth (1969)	Stars/Time/Bubbles/Love (1970)	...Sing for Very Important People (1970)

Professional ratings
Review scores
Source	Rating
Pitchfork Media	8/10 stars

Stars/Time/Bubbles/Love is the fourth album from The Free Design. It was released in May 1970. In 2004, it was named "The Free Design's best album to date" by Dominique Leone on Pitchfork.

== Track listing ==
All songs are by Chris Dedrick except where otherwise noted.

1. "Bubbles"
2. "Tomorrow Is the First Day of the Rest of My Life" (C. C. Courtney)
3. "Kije's Ouija"
4. "Butterflies Are Free" (Stephen Schwartz)
5. "Stay Off Your Frown"
6. "Starlight"
7. "Time and Love" (Laura Nyro)
8. "I'm a Yogi"
9. "Raindrops Keep Fallin' on My Head" (Bacharach/David)
10. "Howdjadoo" (Carole Bayer Sager/George Fischoff)
11. "That's All People"
