= Kenneth G. Mills =

Canadian artist (1923–2004)

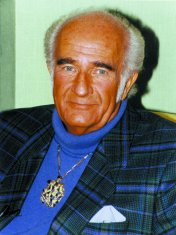
- Kenneth George Mills
- Born: January 25, 1923; St. Stephen, New Brunswick, Canada
- Died: October 8, 2004 (aged 81); Toronto, Ontario, Canada

Kenneth George Mills (January 25, 1923 – October 8, 2004) was a Canadian metaphysical/philosophical speaker and author. An exponent of the oral tradition, he gave spontaneous lectures and poetry for over 37 years. At the same time, he became noted for his accomplishments in music, particularly as the conductor of the choral ensemble The Star-Scape Singers. He excelled at composing, painting and design and has been described by some as a New Age man, a man for all seasons, and a Renaissance man.

== Life ==
Mills was born in St. Stephen, New Brunswick in January 1923. He attended Mount Allison University in Sackville, New Brunswick. Trained from the age of 7 in music, he became a concert pianist, with debuts in Toronto in 1952 and New York City in 1961. Though he chose to end his career as a concert pianist in 1963, he concentrated on teaching piano and adjudicating young musicians for another ten years. Living in Toronto, he began speaking spontaneously to those who requested that he do so, ultimately offering many thousands of hours of metaphysical/philosophical lectures and meetings over his lifetime.

Mills extended his musical interests in 1976 when he formed the a cappella vocal ensemble The Star-Scape Singers. He and his singers would eventually give concerts throughout Eastern and Western Europe and the United States. Mills also engaged in musical composition, creating both choral and orchestral works. In addition, he explored various types of designing, and in 1993 created a line of haute couture fashions. His interest in painting yielded more than 200 large canvases. He was recognized for mentoring and sponsorship of artists in all these disciplines, and he continued his mentoring and spontaneous speaking until shortly before his death in October 2004.

== Spontaneous lectures ==
In 1964, Mills decided to speak about his inner experiences, but only if asked to do so. He made this agreement after he received the same message from two different sources: "You must learn to speak the Word again." Then, people began seeking him out - sometimes arriving unexpectedly on his doorstep - asking about their deepest questions and concerns. Mills found himself speaking spontaneously to these seekers. When their number became too large to speak with individually, Mills began giving lectures. He defined his spontaneous speaking, which he called Unfoldment, as "an impromptu performance under the impelling of divine ideas. It is a projection from another dimension or plane of consciousness, causing those prepared to hear to awaken to the higher or greater possibilities of living beyond the limits of three dimensions and translating what seems to be the ordinary into another level of consideration." He also often spoke in poetry, offering some 3,000 extemporaneous poems during his lifetime.

Many of Mills' spontaneous lectures were recorded and transcribed. Ultimately, a number of them were gathered together and published as books or as spoken word recordings, described by one reviewer as offering metaphysical ideas which are "provocative and deeply inspiring." A reviewer of one of his poetry books observed that Mills' universal themes "revolve around wonder, light and love," while an endorsement on another of his books described Mills as having fun with the language and the sounds of words. It has also been pointed out that Mills' lectures and books "give a universal, metaphysical perspective on some of the most perplexing problems faced by men and women today."

In 1989, the Earth-Stage Actors, a New York City–based ensemble, began to dramatize excerpts from Mills' publications. Critics have called these dramatizations "a theatre of philosophy" and "modern-day Shakespeare."

== Music ==
Mills’ philosophy always possessed for him strong musical implications. "The purpose of Music is to reveal to man his innate at-one-ment with a harmonic state of Being", he said. When three singers (from the vocal group The Free Design) asked him for help with their voices in 1976, Mills soon found himself re-engaging the world of concertizing. Within a short time, the three singers were joined by seven others, and the a cappella vocal ensemble he called The Star-Scape Singers was formed. These singers were ultimately acclaimed in the United States and abroad as creators of a renaissance in choral art.

Star-Scape made their American debut at Carnegie Hall in 1981, ultimately performing seven different concerts there between 1981 and 1986. New York City critics described them as "an instrument of bright and extraordinary varied capacity" and "a vocal ensemble of rare distinction." In 1983, the Singers embarked upon their first tour to Europe, performing at several large choral festivals, and on subsequent tours at many of the great halls and cathedrals of both Western and Eastern Europe. One critic in Munich described their work with Mills as "phenomenal, artistic, one-of-a-kind vocal art." Mills and the ensemble made a total of seven lengthy European and Soviet tours. While on tour in 1984, they were asked to make a recording for broadcast on Radio Vatican, inaugurating the World Year of Music in 1985. One of their performances of The Fire Mass, considered the ensemble's major work, at Roy Thomson Hall in Toronto was broadcast nationwide by the (Canadian Broadcasting Corporation) in 1988. On their tour to the then-USSR in 1991, Mills and the Singers led the first non-military Victory Day Parade down Gorky Street in Moscow.

Mills co-composed or arranged over 150 pieces for the Star-Scape repertoire in collaboration with composer Christopher Dedrick. In 1996, Mills began composing spontaneous orchestral works, using four MIDI keyboards plus foot pedals to capture his instantaneous compositions. Critics have credited him with bridging the classical and new age genres. His goal was to approximate the sounds of real instruments as closely as possible with the keyboards, and in 2002 a CD of several of his orchestral compositions, titled Majestic Tonescape, was released, performed by musicians from the Toronto Symphony Orchestra.

== Other endeavors ==
In February 1993, Mills began to draw and paint for the first time. He soon became a prolific painter of large canvasses, creating more than 200 in less than three years. Most of his paintings depict huge flowers or otherworldly landscapes, and they have been recognized for the bold use of color and their energy. The paintings have been exhibited in both Canada and the U.S., and some are found in private collections.

Mills also ventured into the realm of fashion design. Ultimately, he created an elegant line of haute couture fashions, Moulins Originales, many of which were debuted in a fashion show titled The Integrity of Elegance. This showing was captured on a pioneering high-definition television recording at New York City's Ed Sullivan Theater in February 1993. Another showing of Mills' designs occurred at the Design Exchange in Toronto during the PRIME Mentors' 10th Anniversary Celebration, in 1997.

== Recognition ==
At the gala banquet of the MedArt International 1992 World Congress, a gathering of physicians and artists who specialize in bringing the arts to medicine, Mills was presented with a Special Recognition Award "for the outstanding healing power of his art" (i.e. his music).

A lifelong supporter of the arts, Mills founded Patrons of Wisdom in 1980, a non-profit organization that supported and encouraged young classical musicians and artists. In recognition of his continuous support of deserving individuals and "for being an exemplary mentor and for serving as a role model par excellence whom society could look up to for inspiration and guidance," he was chosen Honorary PRIME Mentor of Canada in April 1997.

In 1998, Mills was awarded an honorary doctorate of Humanities from Wolfe’s University. That same year, the Senate of Canada recognized Mills with their Award of Excellence "for outstanding achievement in humanity, education, philosophy and arts."

== Works ==
=== Lectures ===
==== Books ====
- Question and Answer Encounters with Kenneth G. Mills (2008) ISBN 978-0-919842-70-0
- The Candy Maker's Son: the memoirs of Kenneth G. Mills (2007) ISBN 978-0-919842-69-4
- The Cornucopia of Substance (2004) ISBN 978-0-919842-60-1
- Change Your Standpoint ~ Change Your World (1996) ISBN 978-0-919842-21-2
- Tyranny of Love (1995) ISBN 978-0-919842-17-5
- The Key: Identity (1994) ISBN 978-0-919842-18-2
- The Golden Nail (1993) ISBN 978-0-919842-13-7
- A Word Fitly Spoken (1980)
- The New Land! Conscious Experience Beyond Horizons (1978) ISBN 978-0-919842-01-4
- Given to Praise! An Array of Provocative Metaphysical-Philosophical Utterances (1976) ISBN 978-0-919842-00-7

==== Recordings ====
- Renaissance Man Kenneth G. Mills (2009)
- The Key: Identity (2006– )
- The Golden Nail (2003–2005)
- Change Your Standpoint ~ Change Your World (2001–2003) ISBN 978-91-984234-8-8
- The New Land! (2001)
- Freedom Is Found (1991) ISBN 978-0-919842-12-0
- The Quickening Spirit of Radiance (1990) ISBN 978-0-919842-10-6
- Near to the Fire (1979)
- The Seal of Approval (1979) ISBN 978-0-919842-03-8
- The Newness of the Unchanging (1978) ISBN 978-0-919842-02-1
- The Beauty Unfoldment (1977)
- Given to Praise! (1976)

==== Aphorisms ====
- Food for No Thought, Vols. I and II (1999, 2000) ISBN 978-0-919842-26-7, ISBN 978-0-919842-29-8

==== Poetry ====
- Words of Adjustment (1998) ISBN 978-0-919842-09-0
- The Tonal Garment of the Word (recording) (1995, 2002) ISBN 978-0-919842-24-3
- Embellishments (1986) ISBN 978-0-919842-08-3
- Anticipations (1980) ISBN 978-0-919842-07-6
- Surprises (1980)
- Flame on the Hearth (recording) (1978, 2001)
- Given to Praise: The Spontaneous Poetry of Kenneth G. Mills (recording) (1976)

=== Music ===
==== Instrumental compositions ====
- Majestic ToneScape (2002)
- Promethean Fire (2000)
- Arrival of the Unexpected (1998)
- Let Robots Melt (1997)

==== Choral recordings conducting The Star-Scape Singers ====
- Greatest Hits, Vols. 1 and 2 (2001, 2003)
- Tonal Persuasions, Vols. I and II (1993, 1994)
- The Song – The Heart of Christmas (1990)
- The Fire Mass (1990)
- A Sound Voyage (1986)
- The Heraldic Message (1985)
- Rapture of Freedom (1984)
- Rhapsody of Song (1984)
- Star-Scape Over Europe, Vols. 1, 2, and 3 (1983)
- The Sound of a Star (1982)
- Love Clothes the Jungle (1981)
- Sing Unto Me a New Song (1980)
- Watch! (1980)
- Sing Those Wonderful Words (1979)
- Alive at Ontanaka! (1978)
- On This Rock! (1977)

==== Dianne Forsyth ====
- Lady on the Landing (1982)

=== Drama (Earth-Stage Actors) ===
- Coat of Many Colors (1996)
- What If You Decided to Be Real? (1989)

=== Documentaries ===
- The Rapture of Being (1997)
- Did You Feel It? (1993)
