= Kites Are Fun (song) =

1967 song by The Free Design

Single by The Free Design

from the album Kites are Fun
- B-side: "The Proper Ornaments"
- Released: 1967
- Genre: Soft pop
- Length: 2:41
- Label: Project 3
- Songwriter(s): Chris Dedrick
- Producer(s): Enoch Light

The Free Design singles chronology
"Kites Are Fun" (1967)	"Umbrellas" (1967)

"Kites Are Fun" is a song by American group The Free Design from their debut studio album by the same name.

== Background and composition ==
"Kites Are Fun" is a 2-minute-41-second soft pop song switching between the keys of E major and A major, with a tempo of 138 beats per minute. The vocals range from F#3 to B4. The song is carried by instruments such as acoustic guitar, tambourines, bass guitar, soft drums and a flute.

The song, written by Chris Dedrick and produced by Enoch Light, uses kites to symbolize youth, innocence, and memories, describing a group of children, presumably the Dedrick siblings, running, laughing and flying kites in a field far away from their parents because the parents don't realize that kites are fun.

On the B-side is a song titled "The Proper Ornaments."

== Reception and charts ==
A writer for Billboard magazine called it an "interesting rhythm item by a unique pop group," said it had "some of the feel" of previous sunshine pop hits from 1966 and 1967 such as "Yellow Balloon" by The Yellow Balloon and "Up, Up and Away" by The 5th Dimension. A writer for Cashbox magazine described it as a "cute, bright and breezy glider with punchy lyrics — an easy-drifting ballad in the modern pop style," and compared the B-side to music from Spanky and Our Gang. PopMatters writer Dylan Nelson wrote "There's something, aside from the haze of '60s sentimentalism that makes the song sort of trippy. Perhaps it’s the very notion of bringing such sophisticated arrangements and such polished sounds to a song so simplistic and childish that feels paradoxically radical."

"Kites Are Fun" cracked the Bubbling Under Hot 100 chart (an extension of the Hot 100) at number 114 at the end of 1967, as well as number 33 on the adult contemporary chart, becoming the group's only charting song.

== In popular culture ==
- In 1968 Tony Mottola and the Groovies covered the song.
- In 1997 the band Tomorrow's World covered the song.
- A cover of the song by The Parallelograms appeared in the show Yo Gabba Gabba! in the 2007 episode "Happy."
- It was used as the theme music to the Irish comedy TV show Your Bad Self in 2010.
- The song reached minor traction on TikTok in April and May 2020 and its sound was even used by Doja Cat.
- In 2005 a London-based "jangle-pop" band named themselves The Proper Ornaments, after the title of this single's B-side.
