= The Postmarks =

Indie pop band

- Origin: Miami, Florida, U.S.
- Genres: Pop, indie pop
- Years active: 2004–2010 · 2024–present
- Label: Unfiltered
- Members: Christopher Moll; Tim Yehezkely; Jonathan Phillip Wilkins; Jeff Wagner; Brian Hill
- Website: www.thepostmarks.com

The Postmarks are an indie pop band originally from Pompano Beach, Florida formed in 2004. They released three albums and an EP between 2006 and 2009.

== History ==
The band formed in 2004 with an initial lineup of Tel Aviv-born Tim Yehezkely (vocals), who left her Chemistry course at Florida Atlantic University to join the band, along with multi-instrumentalists Christopher Moll and J. Phillip Wilkins, who had both previously played in See Venus. Their self-titled album was released in February 2007 and has been met with critical acclaim from Rolling Stone and Spin, as well as Pitchfork Media, and a host of other publications. The group was discovered by Andy Chase of Ivy and subsequently released on his Unfiltered Records label. Before the release of the album, an EP of remixes was released on iTunes featuring remixes by James Iha, Brookville, Roger O'Donnell, Tahiti 80 and more.

In Spring 2007, the band toured North America with Smoosh and Memphis. The lineup expanded to include Jeff Wagner on keyboards and Brian Hill on bass guitar. A brief summer tour took place to coincide with the band's appearance at the Lollapalooza festival. The group is featured in the "Love" episode of the Nick Jr. show, Yo Gabba Gabba!.

By the Numbers is a series of cover songs released every month of 2008 with each track containing a number in the title. The initial release of the series was exclusive to Emusic in the form of free downloads. The mp3s have since been removed, and the complete collection was released in November 2008. The album met with positive reviews, receiving a 7.4 rating from Pitchfork Media, and the Orlando Weekly saying "the album charms with a sense of whimsy". PopMatters called it "a LP's worth of surprisingly coherent recontextualisations...a luxuriating delight". American Songwriter called it "Moody and Cool".

The band's second album of original material titled Memoirs at the End of the World was released in 2009. The album received a 7.6 rating from Pitchfork Media, with Matthew Solarski calling it "a thing of pristine orchestrated pop beauty". Following the release of the album, the most extensive touring to date took place, including the band's first visit to Europe and a US tour with Stellastarr and Peter Bjorn and John.

The group went on hiatus in 2010. Tim Yehezkely has another project called Tim & Adam with Adam from shoegaze giant Whirlaway; They released a self-titled album in 2013. Christopher Moll has moved onto a self produced project with a retro-soul sound called The Lovers Key, along with singer Maco Monthervil. J. Phillip Wilkins continues with his personal music projects Our Man In Pompano, Grand Theft Otto, and film scores. Jeff Wagner has been active in the Miami Noise music scene since 2011, appearing with The Dot Dot Dot Orchestra and performing solo as Colour With Sound.

In 2024, The Postmarks began releasing new music, including a re-imagining of their 2007 Valentine's Day song "My Little Heart". For Halloween, they released the '60s-style dub track "Whispers In The Dark". In December, the band released the Winter track "The Glow Of The Snow" to address SAD (Seasonal Affective Disorder).

== Musical style and influences ==
The band's music has been described as indie pop or chamber pop. Paul Lester, writing in The Guardian, described them as "a cutie version of Cowboy Junkies/Mazzy Star's narcotic alt.country, Slowdive minus the feedback or Stereolab without the electronic effects". The band's music draws influence from film soundtracks and easy listening music.

== Discography ==
- Remixes EP (Unfiltered, 2006)
- The Postmarks (Unfiltered, 2007)
- By the Numbers (Unfiltered, 2008)
- Memoirs at the End of the World (Unfiltered, 2009)
