= By the Numbers =

Studio album by The Postmarks
- Released: November 11, 2008
- Genre: Indie pop
- Length: 44:42
- Producer: Christopher Moll, Jon Wilkins

The Postmarks chronology
The Postmarks (2007)	By the Numbers (2008)	Memoirs at the End of the World (2009)

Professional ratings
Review scores
Source	Rating
AllMusic	3.5/5 stars
Chart Attack	3.5/5 stars
Pitchfork Media	(7.4/10)

By the Numbers is an album of covers performed by The Postmarks, released in 2008.

== Track listing ==
1. "One Note Samba" (Antonio Carlos Jobim)- 3:05
2. "You Only Live Twice" (Nancy Sinatra) - 2:57
3. "Three Little Birds" (Bob Marley) - 3:51
4. "OX4" (Ride)- 4:56
5. "Five Years" (David Bowie) - 4:19
6. "Six Different Ways" (The Cure)- 4:15
7. "7-11" (The Ramones) - 3:40
8. "Eight Miles High" (The Byrds) - 4:15
9. "Nine Million Rainy Days" (The Jesus & Mary Chain) - 3:57
10. "Slaughter on Tenth Avenue" (Richard Rodgers) - 2:27
11. "11:59" (Blondie) - 3:47
12. "Pinball Number Count" (The Pointer Sisters) - 2:13

== Personnel ==
- Tim Yehezkely - Vocals, Instrumentation
- Christopher Moll - Guitar, Vocals, Instrumentation
- Jon Wilkins - Drums, Instrumentation
- Jeff Wagner - Piano, Organ, Moog Synthesizer
- Brian Hill - Bass
