= Memoirs at the End of the World =

Studio album by The Postmarks
- Released: August 18, 2009
- Genre: Indie pop
- Label: Unfiltered Records

The Postmarks chronology
By the Numbers (2008)	Memoirs at the End of the World (2009)

Professional ratings
Review scores
Source	Rating
Pitchfork Media	7.6/10.0 link

Memoirs at the End of the World is the second album by The Postmarks, and was released on August 18, 2009.

Pitchfork.com gave the album a 7.6/10.0

== Track listing ==
1. "No One Said This Would Be Easy" - 3:33
2. "My Lucky Charm" - 4:33
3. "Thorn In Your Side" - 3:29
4. "Don't Know Till You Try" - 3:08
5. "All You Ever Wanted" - 5:01
6. "Run Away Love" - 1:04
7. "For Better...or Worse?" - 3:19
8. "I'm In Deep" - 3:48
9. "Thorn In Your Side (Reprise)" - 1:33
10. "Go Jetsetter" - 3:01
11. "Theme from 'Memoirs'" - 2:14
12. "The Girl from Algenib" - 6:17
13. "Gone" - 4:30

== Personnel ==
- Tim Yehezkely - Vocals
- Christopher Moll - Guitar, Vocals, Instrumentation
- Jon Wilkins - Drums, Instrumentation
- Jeff Wagner - Keyboards, Instrumentation
- Brian Hill - Bass
