= The Postmarks (album) =

Studio album by The Postmarks
- Released: 2007
- Length: 39:32
- Label: Unfiltered

The Postmarks chronology
Remixes EP (2006)	The Postmarks (2007)	By the Numbers (2008)

Professional ratings
Review scores
Source	Rating
AllMusic	4/5 stars
Pitchfork	7.9/10

The Postmarks is an album by the Postmarks, released in 2007.

== Track listing ==
1. "Goodbye" – 3:30
2. "Looks Like Rain" – 3:32
3. "Summers Never Seem to Last" – 3:12
4. "Winter Spring Summer Fall" – 3:34
5. "Watercolors" – 4:05
6. "Know Which Way the Wind Blows" – 4:59
7. "Weather the Weather" – 2:21
8. "Leaves" – 1:45
9. "Let Go" – 4:07
10. "You Drift Away" – 3:49
11. "The End of the Story" – 4:38
