= The Free Design =

American sunshine/baroque pop vocal group

Background information
- Origin: Delevan, New York, United States
- Genres: Sunshine pop, baroque pop
- Years active: 1967–1972, 2000–2001
- Labels: Project 3, Ambrotype, Marina, Light in the Attic
- Past members: Chris Dedrick; Sandy Dedrick; Bruce Dedrick; Ellen Dedrick; Stefanie Dedrick; Rebecca Pellett
- Website: www.thefreedesign.com

The Free Design was a Delevan, New York–based vocal group, whose music can be described as sunshine pop and baroque pop. Though they did not achieve much commercial recognition during their main recording career, their work later influenced bands including Belle and Sebastian, Stereolab, Cornelius, Pizzicato Five, Beck and the High Llamas.

== Early life and career ==
The members were all members of the Dedrick family: Chris Dedrick (12 September 1947 – 6 August 2010), sister Sandy and brother Bruce were the original lineup. Chris Dedrick wrote most of the songs. Younger sister Ellen joined the group later, and youngest sister Stefanie (1952–1999) joined near the end of their initial career. Their dad, Arthur, was a trombonist and music arranger. Their uncle Rusty Dedrick was a jazz trumpeter with Claude Thornhill and Red Norvo. They formed the band while living in New York City. Chris has said the group was influenced by vocal groups like The Hi-Los (who performed in Greenwich Village frequently at the time) along with Peter, Paul and Mary and the counterpoint experiments of Benjamin Britten. Their trademark sound involved complex harmonies, jazz-like chord progressions and offbeat time signatures, due to the classical training by Chris.

The band released seven albums from 1967 to 1972, the first six on Enoch Light's Project 3 label and the last one, There is a Song, on the Ambrotype label. For the most part, they were accompanied on the albums by studio musicians.

Bruce Dedrick produced the 1969 single "You're Never Gonna Find Another Love", a Mickey Nicotra composition for The Sermon, which became a hit for the group. In addition to the production, the background vocals were provided by members of the Dedrick family.

== Post-breakup ==
After the band's breakup in 1972, Chris Dedrick recorded a solo album, Be Free, which went unreleased until 2000. He moved to Toronto, Ontario, where he became a music producer, arranger, and classical and soundtrack composer. He worked with directors Guy Maddin and Don McKellar, winning a Genie Award for Maddin's The Saddest Music in the World. He also made music for The Ray Bradbury Theater TV series. In 1997, Dedrick won a Gemini Award for his work on the television series Road to Avonlea. Chris was nominated sixteen times for Gemini awards, winning a total of four, the others for Million Dollar Babies, Shipwreck on the Skeleton Coast and The Great Canadian Polar Bear Adventure. He won a SOCAN award for Tripping the Wire and a Hot Docs award, also for Shipwreck on the Skeleton Coast.

Chris, Sandy and Ellen became the core members of the Star-Scape Singers in 1976, a classical vocal ensemble led by Dr. Kenneth G. Mills. Chris Dedrick also served as the group's main composer. The group performed and toured extensively throughout the 1980s and 1990s.

== Revived interest and later years ==
During their career, The Free Design did not gain commercial success. They remained in obscurity after disbanding in 1972. Starting in the mid-1990s, interest in them grew as part of a general resurgence of popularity in easy listening and sunshine pop from the 1960s and 1970s. In 1994, Japanese musician Cornelius reissued The Free Design catalog on his Trattoria label. In 1998, the Spanish Siesta label released four compilation albums of their music. Stereolab named a 1999 single "The Free Design" (though the song itself had no direct connection to the band).

In 2000 the band re-grouped, after a nearly 30-year retirement, to record the song "Endless Harmony" on the Beach Boys tribute album Caroline Now!: The Songs of Brian Wilson and the Beach Boys. This experience convinced them to record a new full-length album, 2001's Cosmic Peekaboo, which featured the original lineup (Chris, Sandy and Bruce) in addition to Rebecca Pellett, who had previously been Chris Dedrick's musical assistant for several years.

In 2001, the label Cherry Red released a Best of Free Design compilation. From 2002 to 2005, the original albums were reissued in the United States by the Light in the Attic label. In 2005, the label put out The Now Sound Redesigned, an album of Free Design remixes from established acts like Stereolab, Super Furry Animals and Peanut Butter Wolf.

Stefanie Dedrick died on April 5, 1999, from the effects of amyotrophic lateral sclerosis. Chris Dedrick died on August 6, 2010, from cancer, at age 62. According to a message posted on his official site by his wife Moira, Dedrick died “after a week of increasing radiance, yet with rapid physical decline.”

On December 19, 2023, a new version of "Shepherds and Wisemen" was released with a 1968 vocal married to a new backing track produced by Fernando Perdomo with horns by Probyn Gregory of Brian Wilson Band.

== In popular culture ==
The song "Love You" is featured during the credits of the film Stranger Than Fiction (2006), as the ending theme of season four on the Showtime hit Weeds, and season one (episode two) of Forever (2018). It is the theme song to the podcast Jordan, Jesse, Go!, which began in 2007. The song is also the basis of the 2007 episode "I Love You" of the animated web series Julius and Friends, by Paul Frank Industries.

"Love You" has been featured in TV commercials for Peters Drumstick ice creams in Australia (2007), Freia Smil chocolate in Norway (2008), mobile network operator Cosmote in Greece (2009), Toyota internationally (2009–2010), DC Shoes (2010), Delta Air Lines (2015), Zillow (2022) in the United States, and Canadian financial services company Tangerine in 2023.

The Free Design song "I Found Love" was included on the 2002 Gilmore Girls soundtrack. This song also plays during the intro in season 2 episode 4, "Thanks!", of Corporate, and during the end credits of the 2021 film Werewolves Within.

The song "Kites Are Fun" was used as the theme music to the Irish comedy TV show Your Bad Self in 2010.

== Cover versions ==
In 1997, the band Tomorrow's World covered their song "Kites Are Fun". The Free Design song "Bubbles" was covered by Dressy Bessy on the 2000 The Powerpuff Girls soundtrack, and performed live by LA power-pop band Wondermints in the late 1990s. Chicago's The Flat Five often covered "Kites Are Fun" in their live set in the 2010s.

Cover versions of their songs "Kites Are Fun", "I Found Love" and "2002 - A Hit Song" all appeared on the children's show Yo Gabba Gabba! "Kites Are Fun" was also covered by The Parallelograms, and appeared on the 2007 episode "Happy". "I Found Love" was covered by Trembling Blue Stars, and was featured on the 2008 episode "Love". "2002 - A Hit Song" was adapted for the 2009 episode "Band", and performed by the cast of the show.

== Discography ==
=== Selected singles ===
- "Kites Are Fun" (US/US Bub. No. 114)

=== Albums ===
- Kites Are Fun (1967)
- You Could Be Born Again (1968)
- Heaven/Earth (1969)
- Stars/Time/Bubbles/Love (1970)
- ...Sing for Very Important People (1970)
- One By One (1971)
- There is a Song (1972)
- Cosmic Peekaboo (2001)
- The Now Sound Redesigned (2005)
