= Adolescents discography =

- Studio albums: 11
- EPs: 6
- Live albums: 3
- Compilation albums: 1
- Singles: 2
- Video albums: 1
- Other appearances: 4

The discography of the Adolescents, a Southern California-based punk rock band, consists of eleven studio albums, three live albums, one compilation album, six EPs, two singles, and one video album.

The Adolescents formed in Fullerton, California in January 1980; the original lineup consisted of singer Tony Reflex, bassist Steve Soto, guitarists Frank Agnew and John O'Donovan, and drummer Peter Pan. They recorded several demos, two of which—"Who Is Who" and "Wrecking Crew"—were later released on BYO Records' inaugural release Someone Got Their Head Kicked In! (1982). O'Donovan and Pan left the band that June and were replaced, respectively, by Agnew's older brother Rikk Agnew and by Casey Royer. This lineup recorded the song "Amoeba" for the Rodney on the ROQ compilation (Posh Boy Records, 1980) as well as the band's first album, Adolescents, released in April 1981 through Frontier Records. Rikk Agnew left the group and was briefly replaced by Pat Smear, then by Steve Roberts; this lineup recorded the Welcome to Reality EP, but broke up two months before its October 1981 release through Frontier.

The Adolescents lineup reunited in 1986 and began working on a new album, but Frank Agnew and Royer left before recording began. They were replaced, respectively, by Agnew's younger brother Alfie Agnew and Sandy Hansen for the band's second album, Brats in Battalions, which was recorded in the summer of 1986 and released August 1987 through SOS Records. Alfie Agnew left the band in late 1986 and was replaced by Dan Colburn, but by the end of 1987 both Reflex and Colburn quit the group. Frank Agnew rejoined Soto, Hansen, and Rikk Agnew for one more album as the Adolescents, 1988's Balboa Fun*Zone (released through Triple X Records), before the group broke up again in April 1989. A live album, Live 1981 & 1986, was released in 1989 by Triple X, and the Adolescents lineup briefly reunited once again for live performances; a December 1989 show in Los Angeles was recorded and later released as Return to the Black Hole (Amsterdamned Records, 1997).

The Adolescents lineup once again reunited in 2001, but Royer soon left and was replaced by Derek O'Brien. The band began writing new material and recorded a live album and concert film, Live at the House of Blues (2004), part of Kung Fu Records' The Show Must Go Off! series. Rikk Agnew left, and the lineup of Reflex, Soto, O'Brien, and Frank Agnew recorded the Adolescents' reunion album, OC Confidential, released in 2005 through Finger Records. That year also saw the release of The Complete Demos 1980–1986 through Frontier Records, a compilation of the band's earliest demo recordings. More lineup changes took place over the next several years; since 2008, Reflex and Soto have been the Adolescents' sole constant members and primary songwriters, and the band has released four more studio albums through German label Concrete Jungle Records. 2011's The Fastest Kid Alive included drummer Armando Del Rio and guitarists Mike McKnight and Joe Harrison. Harrison was then replaced by Dan Root, and the band released the American Dogs in Europe EP (2012) and 2013's Presumed Insolent. Del Rio was replaced by Mike Cambra and McKnight by Leroy Merlin prior to 2014's La Vendetta..., and Merlin was replaced by Ian Taylor for 2016's Manifest Density. The band released their ninth album, Cropduster, on July 20, 2018. This marked the final album with founding member and bassist Steve Soto who died on June 27, 2018. On October 23, 2020, the band released their tenth album, Russian Spider Dump. The band released their eleventh album, Caesar Salad Days, on July 14, 2023.

== Studio albums ==
Year	Album details
1981	Adolescents: Released: April 1981; Label: Frontier (1003); Formats: LP, cassette, CD
1987	Brats in Battalions: Released: August 1987; Label: SOS (1001); Formats: LP, cassette, CD
1988	Balboa Fun*Zone: Released: 1988; Label: Triple X (51010); Formats: LP, cassette, CD
2005	OC Confidential: Released: July 12, 2005; Label: Finger; Formats: LP, CD
2011	The Fastest Kid Alive: Released: June 3, 2011; Label: Concrete Jungle (1044); Formats: LP, CD
2013	Presumed Insolent: Released: July 26, 2013; Label: Concrete Jungle (1082); Formats: LP, CD
2014	La Vendetta...: Released: July 11, 2014; Label: Concrete Jungle (1086); Formats: LP, CD
2016	Manifest Density: Released: July 8, 2016; Label: Concrete Jungle (1097); Formats: LP, CD
2018	Cropduster: Released: July 20, 2018; Label: Concrete Jungle; Formats: LP, CD, Digital Download
2020	Russian Spider Dump: Released: October 23, 2020; Label: Cleopatra Records; Formats: LP, CD, Digital Download
2023	Caesar Salad Days: Released: July 14, 2023; Label: Frontier Records; Formats: LP, CD, Digital Download

== Live albums ==
Year	Album details
1989	Live 1981 & 1986: Released: 1989; Label: Triple X (51015); Formats: LP, cassette, CD
1997	Return to the Black Hole: Released: September 23, 1997; Label: Amsterdamned (51225); Formats: CD
2004	Live at the House of Blues: Released: February 24, 2004; Label: Kung Fu (78824); Formats: CD/DVD

== Compilation albums ==
Year	Album details
2005	The Complete Demos 1980–1986: Released: March 22, 2005; Label: Frontier (31076); Format: LP, CD

== EPs ==
Year	Album details
1981	Welcome to Reality: Released: October 1981; Label: Frontier (101); Formats: EP
2003	Unwrap and Blow Me!: Released: 2003; Label: none; Formats: CD
2009	Burning Heads / Adolescents: Released: 2009; Label: Slow Death (SD 016); Formats: EP
2012	American Dogs in Europe: Released: August 3, 2012; Label: Concrete Jungle (1067); Formats: EP, CD
2012	Adolescents / Muletrain: Released: 2012; Label: Torreznetes Entertainment (TE 006); Formats: EP
2015	Hot War (split with Svetlanas): Released: January 13, 2015; Label: Altercation (034); Formats: EP

== Singles ==
Year	Song details
1990	"Amoeba": Released: 1990; Label: Posh Boy (PBS 6); Formats: 7"
2015	"Gin": Released: November 5, 2015; Label: Frontier (Boozewax 001); Formats: 7"

== Video albums ==
Year	Video details
2004	Live at the House of Blues: Released: February 24, 2004; Label: Kung Fu (78824); Formats: CD/DVD

== Other appearances ==
The following Adolescents songs were released on compilation albums. This is not an exhaustive list; songs that were first released on the band's albums, EPs, or singles are not included.

Year	Release details	Track(s)
1980	Rodney on the ROQ: Released: 1980; Label: Posh Boy (PBS 106); Format: LP	"Amoeba"
1982	Someone Got Their Head Kicked In!: Released: 1982; Label: BYO (BYO 001); Format: LP	"Who Is Who" (demo); "Wrecking Crew" (demo)
1987	Rat Music for Rat People Vol. III: Released: 1987; Label: CD Presents (CD 048); Format: LP, cassette	"All Day and All of the Night" (originally performed by The Kinks)
2011	Take It or Leave It: A Tribute to the Queens of Noise: Released: 2011; Label: Main Man (MMR 040); Format: CD	"School Days" (originally performed by The Runaways)
