= Live at the House of Blues (Adolescents album) =

Live album and concert film by the Adolescents
- Released: February 24, 2004
- Recorded: October 3, 2003
- Venue: House of Blues at Downtown Disney, Anaheim, California
- Genre: Punk rock
- Length: 52:37
- Label: Kung Fu (78824)
- Producer: Joe Escalante, Nate Weaver

Adolescents chronology
Unwrap and Blow Me! (2003)	Live at the House of Blues (2004)	The Complete Demos 1980–1986 (2005)

Live at the House of Blues is a live album and concert film by the American punk rock band the Adolescents, released in February 2004 on Kung Fu Records as part of the label's The Show Must Go Off! series. It marked a reunion of the band after a twelve-year breakup, and features songs from their original 1980–81 run and from their then-upcoming reunion album OC Confidential (2005).

== Background and recording ==
The Adolescents had disbanded in April 1989, following the release of their third studio album, Balboa Fun*Zone. The band's 1980–81 lineup of singer Tony Brandenburg, bassist Steve Soto, drummer Casey Royer, and guitarist brothers Rikk and Frank Agnew (who had recorded their 1981 debut album, Adolescents, also known as The Blue Album) reunited for a performance that December, which was released eight years later as the live album Return to the Black Hole. In the years following the breakup, the members were involved in other musical projects: Soto formed the parody group Manic Hispanic in 1992, and he, Frank Agnew, and former Adolescents drummer Sandy Hanson simultaneously started a band called Joyride. Frank Agnew soon left to focus on his family life and maintained a low-profile musical career in subsequent years, playing on albums by Tender Fury, Rule 62, and Mr. Mirainga. Soto and Hansen continued with Joyride until 1996, then formed the band 22 Jacks. Royer, meanwhile, resumed his other band, D.I., while Brandenburg started a new group, Sister Goddamn, and Rikk Agnew briefly rejoined the gothic rock band Christian Death and released two solo albums in the early 1990s.

In 1992, Brandenburg and Rikk and Frank Agnew joined other Southern California punk musicians for Pinups, an album of cover versions of punk rock songs from the 1970s and early 1980s on which Soto sang backing vocals. Brandenburg (now using the stage name Tony Reflex), Royer, and Rikk Agnew also formed ADZ; the group's name was a shortened form of Adolescents. Royer and Agnew both left ADZ after the band's first album, Where Were You?; both had substance abuse issues. Royer was addicted to heroin, while Agnew abused a variety of drugs and drank alcohol excessively throughout the 1990s and early 2000s, becoming obese in the process. Royer resumed D.I., while Rikk Agnew again briefly rejoined Christian Death. Brandenburg continued with ADZ throughout the 1990s with other members (Frank Agnew played lead guitar on five tracks on the band's 1995 album Piper at the Gates of Downey).

The Adolescents' Blue Album lineup reunited in 2001. Royer soon left to continue D.I. and was replaced by Derek O'Brien, formerly of Social Distortion, D.I., and Agent Orange. The band began writing new material and issued an EP titled Unwrap and Blow Me! in 2003, limited to 100 copies and consisting of six new songs: "Hawks and Doves", "Where the Children Play", "California Son", "OC Confidential", "Pointless Teenage Anthem", and "Within These Walls". They were approached by Kung Fu Records to record a performance for the label's series of concert films, The Show Must Go Off! The performance took place at the House of Blues at Downtown Disney in Anaheim, California on October 3, 2003. It was filmed with a seven camera setup using 24p digital video, and a 24-track recording system to capture the audio. The set included songs from Adolescents, the Welcome to Reality EP (1981), and the new songs "OC Confidential", "California Son", "Lockdown America", "Hawks and Doves", and "Within These Walls". Rikk Agnew left the band by the end of the year, and they recorded their reunion album, OC Confidential (2005) without him.

== Release and reception ==
Live at the House of Blues was released February 24, 2004 by Kung Fu Records as a combination DVD and compact disc; The CD includes the audio portion of the concert presented as a live album, while the DVD includes the concert film as well as audio commentary by the band, a multi-angle feature allowing the viewer to switch between the seven camera angles, a gallery photographs from the Adolescents' early years, and footage of the band performing a seven-song set in 1982. Scott Heisel of Punknews.org rated the package 2.5 stars out of 5, saying "the crew over at Kung-Fu's video department have put out another quality compilation of footage for their 10th release in the Show Must Go Off series. Editing is once again top-notch, as I hardly recall seeing any of the cameramen pop in the shots. The cuts are quick on the rash edgy So-Cal punk songs and the clips flow great among the members during the set. The sound of the show is admirable as well [...] The only [fault] I find production-wise is the brightness of the footage; it's rather dark and dreary. This could very well be a lighting issue from the club".

== Track listing ==
Writing credits adapted from the studio albums' liner notes.

No.	Title	Writer(s)	Length
1.	"No Way"	Rikk Agnew	2:34
2.	"Who Is Who"	Tony Reflex, Steve Soto, Frank Agnew	1:18
3.	"Self Destruct"	Reflex, Soto	0:53
4.	"Democracy"	Soto, Jim Housman	2:33
5.	"OC Confidential"	Reflex; R. Agnew; Frank Agnew, Jr.	3:29
6.	"Creatures"	R. Agnew	2:04
7.	"Welcome to Reality"	Reflex, Soto, F. Agnew	2:06
8.	"California Son"	Reflex, Soto	3:47
9.	"Wrecking Crew"	Reflex, Soto	2:10
10.	"Lockdown America"	Reflex, Derek O'Brien	3:11
11.	"L.A. Girl"	Reflex, F. Agnew	1:48
12.	"No Friends"	Reflex, Soto	2:34
13.	"Things Start Moving"	Reflex, F. Agnew, Steve Roberts	3:07
14.	"Rip It Up"	Reflex, R. Agnew	2:38
15.	"Hawks and Doves"	Reflex, R. Agnew	1:59
16.	"Within These Walls"	Reflex, F. Agnew	2:07
17.	"Word Attack"	Reflex, R. Agnew	3:02
18.	"Amoeba"	R. Agnew, Casey Royer	1:52
19.	"Kids of the Black Hole"	R. Agnew	3:15
Total length:			52:37

== Personnel ==
Credits adapted from the concert film's credits reel.

Band

- Tony Reflex – lead vocals
- Rikk Agnew – guitar, backing vocals
- Frank Agnew – guitar, backing vocals
- Steve Soto – bass guitar, backing vocals
- Derek O'Brien – drums

Production

- Joe Escalante – director, producer
- Kris Martinez – director
- Nate Weaver – producer, camera operator, DVD authoring
- Miki Takesue – production coordinator
- Jon St. James – recording engineer, mixing engineer
- Matt Bass – camera operator
- Tim Beckett – camera operator
- Brian Hodge – camera operator, film editor
- Mark Keinlen – camera operator
- Ren Messer – camera operator
- Glennon Stratton – camera operator
- Tom Escalante – DVD authoring
- Mickey Stern – packaging and menu graphics
