= OC Confidential =

Studio album by the Adolescents
- Released: July 12, 2005
- Studio: DOB Sound Studio, Glendale, California
- Genre: Punk rock
- Length: 42:26
- Label: Finger
- Producer: Derek O'Brien

Adolescents chronology
The Complete Demos 1980–1986 (2005)	OC Confidential (2005)	Burning Heads / Adolescents (2009)

OC Confidential is the fourth studio album by the American punk rock band the Adolescents, released in July 2005 on Finger Records. It was their first studio album since 1988, and followed their reunion in 2001 after a twelve-year breakup. The album features founding band members Tony Reflex, Frank Agnew, and Steve Soto, joined by drummer Derek O'Brien. It was the final Adolescents album to include Agnew, and their only studio album with O'Brien.

== Background ==
The Adolescents had originally been active from 1980–1981 and 1986–1989, disbanding after their third album, Balboa Fun*Zone (1988). The 1980–1981 lineup of singer Tony Reflex, bassist Steve Soto, drummer Casey Royer, and guitarist brothers Rikk and Frank Agnew (who had recorded 1981's Adolescents, also known as The Blue Album), reunited for a performance in December 1989, which was recorded and released eight years later as the live album Return to the Black Hole (Amsterdamned Records, 1997), but otherwise the Adolescents as a band remained inactive for over a decade. The members were involved in separate projects throughout the 1990s: Soto played in the parody group Manic Hispanic, and he, Frank Agnew, and former Adolescents drummer Sandy Hanson started a band called Joyride in 1992. Frank Agnew soon left to focus on his family life and maintained a low-profile musical career in subsequent years, playing on albums by Tender Fury, Rule 62, and Mr. Mirainga. Soto and Hansen continued with Joyride until 1996, then formed the band 22 Jacks. Royer, meanwhile, remained active his other band, D.I., while Reflex fronted Sister Goddamn from 1992–1995. Rikk Agnew occasionally rejoined the gothic rock band Christian Death for live performances, and released two solo albums in the early 1990s.

In 1992, Reflex and Rikk and Frank Agnew joined other Southern California punk musicians for Pinups, an album of cover versions of punk rock songs from the 1970s and early 1980s on which Soto sang backing vocals. Reflex, Royer, and Rikk Agnew also formed ADZ; the group's name was a shortened form of Adolescents. Royer and Agnew both left ADZ after the band's first album, Where Were You?; both had substance abuse issues. Royer was addicted to heroin, while Agnew abused a variety of drugs and drank alcohol excessively throughout the 1990s and early 2000s, becoming obese in the process. Reflex continued with ADZ throughout the 1990s with other members (Frank Agnew played lead guitar on five tracks on the band's 1995 album Piper at the Gates of Downey).

The Adolescents' Blue Album lineup reunited in 2001 to play a birthday party for Reflex's wife. Over the next few years the band played sporadically, including opening for Bad Religion at a benefit for Flipside and a headlining slot at Los Angeles' Galaxy Theater, but always as a revival act. Royer soon left and was replaced by Derek O'Brien, formerly of Social Distortion, D.I., and Agent Orange. Encouraged by the response to their reunion shows, Reflex suggested that the band start writing new material. Frank Agnew remarked that "When we were in Soto's apartment, it reminded me a lot of when we very first got together. The three of us—the three original members who were putting songs together in Tony's garage—it almost had the same nostalgic vibe, sitting around and throwing out ideas." The Adolescents issued an EP titled Unwrap and Blow Me! in 2003, limited to 100 copies and consisting of six new songs: "Hawks and Doves", "Where the Children Play", "California Son", "OC Confidential", "Pointless Teenage Anthem", and "Within These Walls". A live album and concert film, Live at the House of Blues, was recorded that October and featured performances of "OC Confidential", "California Son", "Hawks and Doves", "Within These Walls", and another new song, "Lockdown America".

Rikk Agnew, however, continued to drink excessively and was not invested in the reunion. He left the band by the end of 2003, halfway through the recording process for a new album. "None of it made me happy anymore," he reflected 11 years later, "I loathed it". He continued to struggle with alcoholism, drug abuse, depression, and morbid obesity over the next several years, but eventually gave up alcohol and hard drugs and improved his health.

== Recording ==
The Adolescents continued without Rikk Agnew, and recorded OC Confidential at O'Brien's recording studio, DOB Sound Studio in Glendale, California. O'Brien served as audio engineer and record producer for the sessions. The band re-recorded the seven new songs they had debuted on Unwrap and Blow Me! and Live at the House of Blues, and recorded six more: "Guns of September", "Death on Friday", "Into the Fire", "Let It Rain", "Monsanto Hayride", and "Find a Way". Jonny Wickersham of Social Distortion played second guitar on the album recording of "OC Confidential". The recording process ultimately took over two years to complete.

Tony Reflex wrote all of the album's lyrics. In 2011, he remarked that OC Confidential "was really a document about the loss of my brothers [...] I had a brother who committed suicide. I had a brother who was murdered. My family history isn't just written, it's also recorded in music." On Live at the House of Blues, which was recorded at the House of Blues at Downtown Disney in Anaheim, California, he introduced "OC Confidential" by saying the song was about growing up near Disneyland and feeling that he lived "in the shadow" of Mickey Mouse. In a 2005 interview prior to the album's release, he spoke of "Monsanto Hayride" being "about the Monsanto chemical company and the dumping of poisonous pesticides into the Anniston area and their bullying of farmers as they developed these Frankenfood seeds. They had a lawsuit where some seeds blew into a neighboring farmer's lot. Well, he benefited from that and they sued him for like copyright-type infringement. For blowing seeds. It'’s not like he intentionally grabbed them or whatever. But this is big business, agricultural bullying stuff."

The completed recordings were mixed by O'Brien and Jim Monroe at DOB Sound, Mad Dog Studios in Burbank, California, and JRM Productions in Orange, California. They were then mastered by Mark Chelecki at Capitol Mastering in Hollywood. Mark DeSalvo created the artwork for the front and back of the album cover, while Francine Diliberti created the art for the disc and interior insert. Frank Agnew declared the finished album to be "the best since the blue album! When we put it together, there was a lot of the original good feeling! The stars were right."

== Release and reception ==
OC Confidential was released July 12, 2005 on Finger Records. For touring in support of the album, the band was joined by Frank Agnew's son, Frank Agnew, Jr., on second guitar. Al Campbell of AllMusic rated the album 3.5 stars out of 5, remarking that "These 13 songs are a bit slower and more melodic than previous releases and a few are blatantly political: 'Hawks and Doves', 'Lockdown America', and 'Guns of September'. The band isn't spitting out Orange County punk with the energy they were once known for, nor are they simply rehashing the style of their early-'80s single 'Amoeba' [...] OC Confidential plainly gives an honest representation of where the Adolescents have been since 1988. Thankfully not rehashing hardcore clichés." Critic Robert Christgau gave the album an "honorable mention", saying "If only Green Day were this mad (they wouldn't have gotten near a Grammy)."

Chris Ziegler of OC Weekly remarked that "In some ways, OC Confidential is a record no one expected, especially after a post-blue-album career politely described as checkered [...] So OC Confidential isn't the blue album, first off—but it's the way that it's not the blue album that makes OC Confidential what it is. If anything, Tony's lyrics are more vicious: any subtlety pounded out ('This is a pointless teenage anthem/About how great things used to be') through cadence-call delivery and A-A-B-B rhyme schemes that make a harsh match to Steve and Frank's tendency to sometimes Beatles-esque (or Cheap Trick?) harmony. The Agnew family genetics are all over Confidential, which on songs like 'Lockdown America' and 'California Son' almost sounds more like Rikk and little brother Alfie's post-1981 band D.I. than the usual Adolescents, especially since Rikk left halfway through the recording (and is now playing with 45 Grave)."

== Track listing ==
Writing credits adapted from the album's liner notes.

All lyrics are written by Tony Reflex.

No.	Title	Music	Length
1.	"Hawks and Doves"	Rikk Agnew	2:03
2.	"Lockdown America"	Derek O'Brien	3:32
3.	"Where the Children Play"	Steve Soto	2:33
4.	"California Son"	Soto	3:31
5.	"Guns of September"	Soto, Frank Agnew	3:18
6.	"Pointless Teenage Anthem"	Soto	1:55
7.	"Death on Friday"	F. Agnew	3:14
8.	"Into the Fire"	F. Agnew	3:59
9.	"Within These Walls"	F. Agnew	3:16
10.	"Let It Rain"	Soto, F. Agnew	3:31
11.	"OC Confidential"	R. Agnew; Frank Agnew, Jr.	3:31
12.	"Monsanto Hayride"	O'Brien	3:43
13.	"Find a Way"	Soto, F. Agnew	4:20
Total length:			42:26

== Personnel ==
Credits adapted from the album's liner notes.

Band

- Tony Reflex – lead vocals, art direction, layout
- Frank Agnew – guitar, backing vocals
- Steve Soto – bass guitar, backing vocals
- Derek O'Brien – drums, backing vocals, audio engineer, mixing engineer, record producer, art direction, layout

Additional musicians

- Jonny Wickersham – second guitar on "OC Confidential"

Production

- Jim Monroe – mixing engineer
- Eric Corne – second engineer
- Rick Ballard – additional engineering
- Paul Mone – additional engineering
- Mark Chelecki – audio mastering

Artwork

- Mark deSalvo – front and back cover art
- Francine Diliberti – disc and insert art
- Erin Williams – band photograph
