= The Complete Demos 1980–1986 =

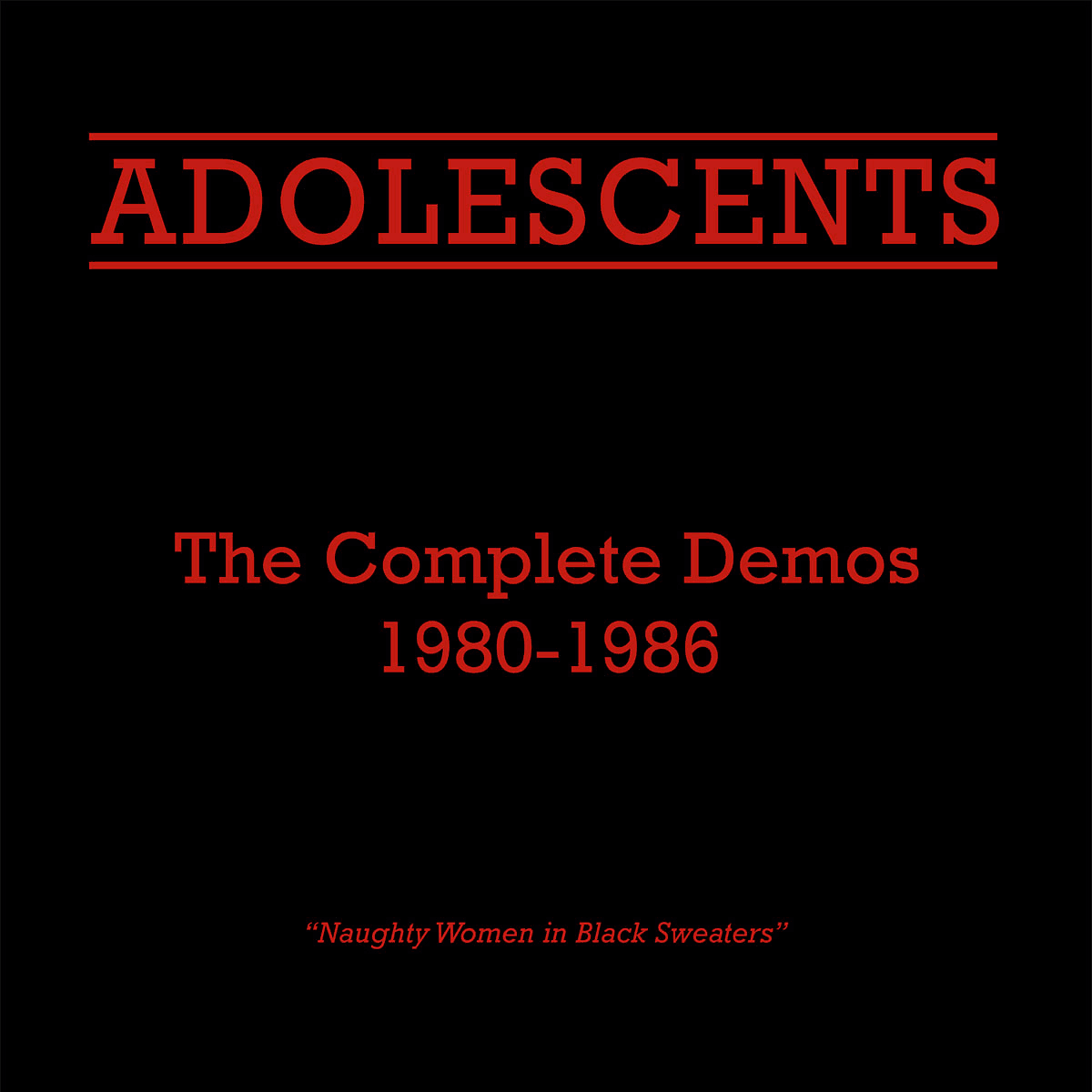

Compilation album by the Adolescents
- Released: March 22, 2005
- Recorded: March 14, 1980; May 1980; July 1980; July 1981; April 1986
- Studio: Phantom Studios, Midway City, California; The Casbah, Fullerton, California; Perspective Sound, Sun Valley, Los Angeles
- Genre: Punk rock
- Length: 29:29
- Label: Frontier (31076)

Adolescents chronology
Live at the House of Blues (2004)	The Complete Demos 1980–1986 (2005)	OC Confidential (2005)

The Complete Demos 1980–1986 is a compilation album of demo recordings by the American punk rock band the Adolescents, released in March 2005 on Frontier Records. It includes the band's first three demo tapes, recorded between March and July 1980; one outtake from the recording sessions for their 1981 EP Welcome to Reality; and two songs recorded during their 1986 reunion as demos for their second album, Brats in Battalions (1987). The first eight tracks are the only material recorded by the Adolescents' original lineup, which included guitarist John O'Donovan and drummer Peter Pan. The remaining tracks include their replacements Rikk Agnew and Casey Royer.

== Material ==
The Complete Demos 1980–1986 consists mainly of material recorded between March and July 1980. The Adolescents had formed in January 1980 with an initial lineup of singer Tony Brandenburg (credited on The Complete Demos by the stage name Tony Reflex), bassist Steve Soto, guitarists Frank Agnew and John O'Donovan, and a drummer who used the stage name Peter Pan. The first four tracks on The Complete Demos— "We Can't Change the World", "Black Sheep", "Growing Up Today", and "We Rule and You Don't"—comprise the band's first demo tape, recorded March 14, 1980 in Brandenburg's mother's garage in Anaheim, California using a Toshiba Reflexon cassette deck, and were never re-recorded for later releases. "I think we last played some of those songs...they left our set in about April or May of 1980", recalled Brandenburg in 2005.

The next four tracks—"I Hate Children", "No Friends", "Who Is Who", and "Wrecking Crew"—comprise the band's second demo tape, recorded in May 1980 at Phantom Studios in Midway City, California with audio engineer Richard Freund. The recordings of "Who Is Who" and "Wrecking Crew" from this tape were released two years later on BYO Records' inaugural release, the compilation album Someone Got Their Head Kicked In!; these were the only recordings released by the Adolescents' original lineup until The Complete Demos.

O'Donovan and Pan both left the band in June 1980 and were replaced by drummer Casey Royer and by Frank Agnew's older brother, guitarist Rikk Agnew, who brought with them several songs written for their prior group, the Detours. Encouraged by having their May 1980 demo tape played on the radio by KROQ-FM disc jockey Rodney Bingenheimer on his "Rodney on the ROQ" program, the new lineup recorded a third demo tape that July at the Casbah in Fullerton, California, with Chaz Ramirez and Eddie Joseph of local band Eddie and the Subtitles engineering the session. The five tracks from this demo—"Wrecking Crew", "Creatures", "Amoeba", "Self Destruct", and "Do the Eddie"—comprise tracks 9–13 of The Complete Demos. "Do the Eddie" was a joke song written about Eddie Joseph, who subsequently became the band's manager.

"I Hate Children", "No Friends", "Who Is Who", "Wrecking Crew", "Creatures", "Amoeba", and "Self Destruct" were all re-recorded for the band's first studio album, Adolescents (also known as The Blue Album), released in March 1981 on Frontier Records. Rikk Agnew left the band a few months after its release. With new guitarist Steve Roberts, the Adolescents recorded an EP, Welcome to Reality, in July 1981 at Perspective Sound in Sun Valley, Los Angeles with Thom Wilson as engineer and record producer. The fourteenth track on The Complete Demos, "Richard Hung Himself", was recorded during this session and intended to be the fourth song on Welcome to Reality, but was left off of the EP before its release. The Adolescents broke up in August 1981, two months before the EP's release on Frontier Records. "Richard Hung Himself" was rewritten by Royer for his subsequent group, D.I., appearing on 1983's D.I. EP with Royer singing, Rikk Agnew on drums, and Steve Roberts on guitar.

The Adolescents' Blue Album lineup reunited in April 1986 and began working on new material. The final two tracks on The Complete Demos—"The Liar" and "Peasant Song"—were recorded that month at the Casbah in Fullerton with Chaz Ramirez engineering. Frank Agnew and Royer both left the band after a few months, and were replaced by the youngest Agnew brother, Alfie, and by former Mechanics drummer Sandy Hanson for the band's second album, Brats in Battalions (1987), which included new recordings of "The Liar" and "Peasant Song" and a new version of "Do the Eddie" retitled "Do the Freddie". After further lineup changes the Adolescents issued one more album, 1988's Balboa Fun*Zone, before disbanding.

== Background ==
The Blue Album lineup reunited in 2001, though Royer soon left and was replaced by Derek O'Brien. The band worked on new material, but Rikk Agnew left by the end of 2003. Continuing without him, the Adolescents worked on material for their reunion album, OC Confidential (2005). On the occasion of Frontier Records' 25th anniversary in 2005, which also coincided with the Adolescents' 25th anniversary, Brandenburg suggested to the label's founder, Lisa Fancher, that they release a collection of the band's demos: "Lisa’s got this 25-year anniversary thing going on with her label (Frontier), and so I talked to her and I said, 'Hey, I've got some old material. Why don't we do a collection of these demos that I've got sitting here?' And because it's her 25 years and our 25 years, it worked out pretty nice."

Compiling the album involved tracking down several of the original recording tapes. O'Brien digitally repaired the March 1980 demo tape at his recording studio, DOB Sound. Frank Agnew had saved the master tape from the May 1980 session, allowing for its inclusion. The original master tapes from the July 1980 session were lost, so the recordings on The Complete Demos were "mastered from nth generation collector tapes" located by Rodney Bingenheimer, Mike Calacion, and Katz Seki. "The source tapes for that were lost but a collector happened to have four of the five songs on a pretty raw cassette", said Brandenburg. The recording of "Richard Hung Himself" was remixed by Paul DuGre for inclusion on the album. The original tapes of the April 1986 demos were also lost. "Lisa had actually forgotten that she had [them]," said Brandenburg, "but I told her, 'Look, you've got to go find those tapes. It's on there.'" Ultimately the recordings of these two songs were mastered from a Chrome Maxell cassette tape found in Brandenburg's garage.

Once the material was compiled, the album was mastered by Paul DuGre in Burbank, California. For the liner notes, Brandenburg, Soto, and Frank Agnew each wrote pieces describing their recollections of and reflections on the band's early years. Agnew designed the album cover, which bears the subtitle "Naughty Women in Black Sweaters". Brandenburg explained that this was an in-joke relating to the late-1970s/early-1980s Fullerton punk scene:

It's kind of a funny little title. And again, you have to kind of know the history of Fullerton music and the Adolescents in particular. There's an intentional inside joke there. The Naughty Women were a transvestite punk rock band from Fullerton who we all loved dearly, just a great rock band. Very, very punk rock, very, very fun. And they're a very funny bunch of guys. And the Black Sweaters were a group of girls that used to always hang around the scene, they were kind of the resident groupies of the early Fullerton scene. So we have Naughty Women in Black Sweaters. You can kind of put it all together and it has a whole new meaning. But even without that insight, the title's kind of funny on any level. But for us, when we did it we were all chuckling. They said, "Do you have an album title?" I said, "Yeah, how about this one?" And I threw that one out and they all just started to laugh.

== Release and reception ==
The Complete Demos 1980–1986 was released March 22, 2005 on Frontier Records. Richie Unterberger of AllMusic rated the album 3 stars out of 5, saying that "Although the speed and energy jumps off the VU meter, fans can't get too over the moon, as the fidelity is often pretty mediocre. True, that's not something that matters to punk listeners as much as it does to followers of many other styles of music. But be warned that, although this will certainly be of interest to Adolescents devotees, the sound is quite substandard on about half of this material, the vocals suffering the most."

== Track listing ==
Writing credits adapted from the album's liner notes.

No.	Title	Writer(s)	Length
1.	"We Can't Change the World" (March 1980 demo)	Steve Soto	1:11
2.	"Black Sheep" (March 1980 demo)	Tony Reflex, Rikk Agnew, Frank Agnew	2:01
3.	"Growing Up Today" (March 1980 demo)	Soto, F. Agnew	2:28
4.	"We Rule and You Don't" (March 1980 demo)	Soto, Reflex	1:39
5.	"I Hate Children" (May 1980 demo)	Soto, Reflex	1:39
6.	"No Friends" (May 1980 demo)	Soto, Reflex	2:19
7.	"Who Is Who" (May 1980 demo)	Soto, Reflex, F. Agnew	1:28
8.	"Wrecking Crew" (May 1980 demo)	Soto, Reflex	1:56
9.	"Wrecking Crew" (July 1980 demo)	Soto, Reflex	1:54
10.	"Creatures" (July 1980 demo)	R. Agnew	1:45
11.	"Amoeba" (July 1980 demo)	R. Agnew, Casey Royer	2:40
12.	"Self Destruct" (July 1980 demo)	Soto, Reflex	0:41
13.	"Do the Eddie" (July 1980 demo)	Reflex, F. Agnew	0:46
14.	"Richard Hung Himself" (outtake from Welcome to Reality sessions, July 1981)	Reflex, F. Agnew, Royer	2:11
15.	"The Liar" (April 1986 demo)	Soto, Reflex	2:09
16.	"Peasant Song" (April 1986 demo)	Reflex, F. Agnew	2:42
Total length:			29:29

== Personnel ==
Credits adapted from the album's liner notes.

Band

- Tony Reflex – lead vocals
- Frank Agnew – guitar, cover design
- Steve Soto – bass guitar
- John O'Donovan – guitar (tracks 1–8)
- Peter Pan – drums (tracks 1–8)
- Rikk Agnew – guitar (tracks 9–13, 15, and 16)
- Casey Royer – drums (tracks 9–16)

Production

- Derek O'Brien – digital repair (tracks 1–4)
- Chaz Ramirez – audio engineer (tracks 9–13,15, and 16)
- Eddie Joseph – audio engineer (tracks 9–13)
- Thom Wilson – audio engineer (track 14)
- Paul DuGre – remixing (track 14), audio mastering (all tracks)
