= Return to the Black Hole =

Live album by the Adolescents
- Released: September 23, 1997
- Recorded: December 1989
- Venue: Reseda Country Club
- Genre: Hardcore punk, punk rock
- Length: 45:20
- Label: Amsterdamned (51225)

Adolescents chronology
Live 1981 & 1986 (1989)	Return to the Black Hole (1997)	Unwrap and Blow Me! (2003)

Return to the Black Hole is a live album by the American punk rock band the Adolescents, released in September 1997 on Amsterdamned Records. It was recorded in December 1989 during a reunion performance by the band's 1980–81 lineup.

== Background and recording ==
Return to the Black Hole captures the second time that the Adolescents' early lineup had reunited. This lineup—singer Tony Brandenburg (here credited by the stage name Tony Adolescent), bassist Steve Soto, drummer Casey Royer, and guitarist brothers Rikk and Frank Agnew—had recorded the band's debut album, 1981's Adolescents, also known as The Blue Album. Rikk Agnew had left the band a few months after the album's release and was replaced, first by Pat Smear and then by Steve Roberts, and the Adolescents had recorded the Welcome to Reality EP before breaking up in August 1981. The Blue Album lineup had reunited for a performance in April 1986 that led to the band re-forming, but Frank Agnew had left after a few months and Royer had left that August. They were replaced, respectively, by Agnew's younger brother Alfie Agnew and by former Mechanics drummer Sandy Hanson for the album Brats in Battalions (1987). Alfie Agnew left by the end of 1986 and was replaced by Dan Colburn, but both he and Brandenburg left the band by the end of 1987. With Frank Agnew rejoining, the Adolescents had issued one more album, 1988's Balboa Fun*Zone, with Soto and Rikk Agnew sharing lead vocal duties, before disbanding in April 1989.

The Blue Album lineup reunited in December 1989 for a show at the Reseda Country Club, which is the performance presented on Return to the Black Hole. This reunion did not lead to a re-formation of the band, as their 1986 reunion had. Instead, the members remained active in other projects: Soto formed the parody group Manic Hispanic in 1992, and he, Frank Agnew, and former Adolescents drummer Sandy Hanson simultaneously formed Joyride. Agnew soon left to focus on his family life and maintained a low-profile musical career in subsequent years, playing on albums by Tender Fury, Rule 62, and Mr. Mirainga. Soto and Hansen continued with Joyride until 1996, then formed the band 22 Jacks. Royer, meanwhile, resumed his other band, D.I., while Brandenburg started a new group, Sister Goddamn, and Rikk Agnew briefly rejoined the gothic rock band Christian Death and released two solo albums in the early 1990s. In 1992, Brandenburg and Rikk and Frank Agnew joined other Southern California punk musicians for Pinups, an album of cover versions of punk rock songs from the 1970s and early 1980s on which Soto sang backing vocals. Brandenburg, Royer, and Rikk Agnew also formed ADZ; the group's name was a shortened form of Adolescents. Royer and Agnew both left ADZ after the band's first album, Where Were You? (1992), and Brandenburg kept the group going throughout the 1990s with other members.

By the time Return to the Black Hole was released in September 1997, Soto was active in 22 Jacks and Brandenburg in ADZ, Frank Agnew was doing occasional studio work as a producer and guest musician, and Royer and Rikk Agnew had both reduced their musical activities due to substance abuse issues: Royer was addicted to heroin, while Agnew abused a variety of drugs and drank alcohol excessively throughout the 1990s and early 2000s, becoming obese in the process. The Adolescents' Blue Album lineup would reunite again in 2001, leading to a relaunch of the band.

== Reception ==
Jack Rabid of AllMusic rated Return to the Black Hole 3 stars out of 5, saying "Not only does Return present a group of not-so-adolescent late twenty-somethings who play their instruments better than in the band's old days — the sheer glee of firing off together again is evident. This rips. This shreds. This blasts. You don't even need to know that this group helped kick off the second wave of punk in Southern California; having initially been outsold only by the Dead Kennedys, they were as popular as Circle Jerks, Black Flag, T.S.O.L., Youth Brigade, Channel 3, Agent Orange, and the young Social Distortion and Bad Religion. All you have to do is take in the might of the soaring leads more or less pioneered by Rikk Agnew and his brother Frank, even more thick and stinging live, and you understand.

== Track listing ==
No.	Title	Writer(s)	Length
1.	"No Way"	Rikk Agnew	3:29
2.	"Who Is Who"	Tony Adolescent, Steve Soto, Frank Agnew	1:28
3.	"Word Attack"	Adolescent, R. Agnew	1:11
4.	"Self Destruct"	Adolescent, Soto	0:42
5.	"L.A. Girl"	Adolescent, F. Agnew	2:02
6.	"Brats in Battalions"	Adolescent, R. Agnew	2:29
7.	"Welcome to Reality"	Adolescent, Soto, F. Agnew	2:10
8.	"Wrecking Crew"	Adolescent, Soto	2:23
9.	"Do the Eddy"	Adolescent, F. Agnew	1:03
10.	"I Love You"	Adolescent, R. Agnew	4:13
11.	"Losing Battle"	Adolescent, Soto, F. Agnew	2:32
12.	"Creatures"	R. Agnew	3:10
13.	"All Day and All of the Night" (originally performed by the Kinks)	Ray Davies	2:42
14.	"Rip It Up"	Adolescent, R. Agnew	2:31
15.	"Amoeba"	R. Agnew, Casey Royer	3:12
16.	"Kids of the Black Hole"	R. Agnew	5:45
17.	"I Got a Right" (originally performed by the Stooges)	Iggy Pop, James Williamson	4:18
Total length:			45:20

== Personnel ==
Credits adapted from the album's liner notes.

Band

- Tony Montana – lead vocals
- Rikk Agnew – guitar
- Frank Agnew – guitar
- Steve Soto – bass guitar
- Casey Royer – drums

Production

- Mark Linett – recording engineer
- Jim Goodwin – audio mixing
- Peter Heur – executive producer
- Dean Naleway – executive producer

Artwork

- Ray Ibe – original composition
- Jeffrey L. Zimmiti – final graphic design
- Kirk Dominguez – photographs
