= Brats in Battalions =

Studio album by the Adolescents
- Released: August 1987
- Recorded: Summer 1986
- Studios: Advanced Media Systems, Orange, California
- Genres: Punk rock, hardcore punk
- Length: 35:17
- Label: SOS (1001)
- Producers: Gordon R. Cox, Tony Montana, Rikk Agnew, Steve Soto, Sandy Hanson, Alfie Agnew

Adolescents chronology
Welcome to Reality (1981)	Brats in Battalions (1987)	Balboa Fun*Zone (1988)

Brats in Battalions is the second studio album by the American punk rock band the Adolescents, released in August 1987 on SOS Records, the band's independent record label. It followed a reunion of the band after a five-year breakup, and subsequent lineup changes which saw drummer Casey Royer and original guitarist Frank Agnew replaced, respectively, by Sandy Hanson of the Mechanics and by Agnew's younger brother, Alfie Agnew. Brats in Battalions explores several styles of punk rock and features new recordings of all three songs from 1981's Welcome to Reality EP, as well as cover versions of the traditional folk song "The House of the Rising Sun" and the Stooges' "I Got a Right". Singer Tony Brandenburg (here using the stage name Tony Montana) left the band after this album, and the Adolescents recorded one more album without him, 1988's Balboa Fun*Zone, before breaking up for another 12 years.

== Background and recording ==
The Adolescents had broken up in August 1981, two months before the release of their Welcome to Reality EP. Guitarist Rikk Agnew, who had left the band earlier that year after the release of their debut album, Adolescents, joined the gothic rock band Christian Death, playing on their 1982 album Only Theatre of Pain, and released a solo album, All by Myself (1982). Singer Tony Brandenburg formed a new band, the Abandoned, who released one album, Killed by Faith (1985). Bassist Steve Soto and guitarist Frank Agnew joined Los Angeles punk band Legal Weapon, playing on their 1982 album Death of Innocence; Agnew remained with them for Your Weapon, released later that year, then moved on to Hvy Drt, playing on their 1985 Hvy Drt EP. Drummer Casey Royer, meanwhile, started D.I., taking on the role of singer, and was joined by Rikk Agnew for the D.I. EP (1983). Agnew then brought in his younger brother, Alfie Agnew, and the two remained in D.I. until 1987, playing on the albums Ancient Artifacts (1985) and Horse Bites Dog Cries (1986), and the Team Goon EP (1987).

The Adolescents lineup of Brandenburg (now using the stage name Tony Montana), Soto, Royer, and Rikk and Frank Agnew played a reunion show in April 1986 at Fender's Ballroom in Long Beach, California which led to the band re-forming. They played more shows and began working on material for a new album, recording a demo of two new songs, "The Liar" and "Peasant Song". Frank Agnew left the band after a few months, however, and was replaced by his younger brother Alfie, then Royer left the group that August. "Casey wanted to keep D.I. going, and I lost interest", said Frank. "I think that when Casey left, the band lost a major part of its sound", reflected Brandenburg in 1989. "Casey always played this kinda surf beat. On top of that, he was a major part of the vocal attack. When Casey left, the band...changed". Royer's replacement was Sandy Hanson, formerly of the Mechanics, a fellow Fullerton, California band that had been a key influence on the Adolescents.

The new Adolescents lineup entered Advanced Media Systems in Orange, California in the summer of 1986 to record their new album, co-produced by the band members and Gordon R. Cox. In addition to "The Liar" and "Peasant Song", they recorded five new songs: "Brats in Battalions", "I Love You", "Skate Babylon", "Marching with the Reich", and "She Wolf". They also rewrote one of the band's early songs, "Do the Eddie"—a joke song from a July 1980 demo tape written about Eddie Joseph of the band Eddie and the Subtitles, who had engineered the demo and subsequently became the band's manager—as "Do the Freddy". The remainder of the album consisted of new recordings of all three songs from the Adolescents' 1981 EP Welcome to Reality ("Welcome to Reality", "Losing Battle", and "Things Start Moving"), and cover versions of the traditional folk song "The House of the Rising Sun" and the Stooges' "I Got a Right". Mike McKnight played additional guitar parts on "The Liar"; he would go on to join Soto and Hanson in their post-Adolescents band Joyride during the early 1990s, and join the re-formed Adolescents from 2008 to 2013, playing on the albums The Fastest Kid Alive (2011) and Presumed Insolent (2013). Brandenburg came up with the concept for Brats in Battalions' cover art, a photograph of young boys holding various firearms. Cover Kids (from Left to Right) Jim Edlund, Jason Shad, Bill Verkamp, Kenny Wetzel, Aaron Calvert, Jim Getz. Picture taken at Rio Vista Park in Anaheim, California.

== Release and reception ==
After completing the album, the Adolescents toured through much of the second half of 1986. Alfie Agnew then left the band at the end of the year to attend college and was replaced by Dan Colburn. The band toured for most of 1987, and Brats in Battalions was released that August in LP and cassette formats on the group's own label, SOS Records. In a retrospective review, Stewart Mason of AllMusic gave the album 2.5 stars out of 5, commenting that "much had changed on the hardcore scene since the band's [1981] split, and Brats in Battalions finds the group foundering a bit as they try to decide which of the several available fragmentary mini-genres they slot into best: Queers/Descendents-style pop/punk, Redd Kross-style sarcastic power pop, Social Distortion-like Americana, Suicidal Tendencies-like punk metal? All are tried on, and while most of them suit the band fine, none of them are exactly right. Interestingly, the best tracks are the Flamin' Groovies-inspired raucous covers of the proto-punk classic 'I Got a Right' and a 'House of the Rising Sun' that turns the Animals' version of the song into a grinding howl of post-hardcore energy."

== Legacy ==
Brats in Battalions was the Adolescents' last album with Brandenburg during the 1980s; both he and Colburn left the band by the end of 1987. Brandenburg stated in 1989, "I was interested in other things (I had joined another band, the Flower Leperds), and the Adolescents touring cut into my school work". Soto, Hanson, and Rikk Agnew decided to continue as the Adolescents with Soto and Agnew sharing lead vocal duties, and recruited guitarist Paul Casey, who left after a few months of touring. Frank Agnew rejoined the band and they recorded the album Balboa Fun*Zone (1988), released by Triple X Records. The band then broke up in April 1989. Triple X re-released Brats in Battalions in compact disc format in 1991. The Adolescents would reunite, with Brandenburg, in 2001.

Songs from Brats in Battalions are performed on each of the band's live albums: "I Got a Right", "The Liar", "Peasant Song", and all three of the Welcome to Reality songs appear on Live 1981 & 1986 (1989); "Brats in Battalions", "Welcome to Reality", "I Love You", "Losing Battle", and "I Got a Right" appear on Return to the Black Hole (1997), and "Welcome to Reality" and "Things Start Moving" appear on Live at the House of Blues (2004).

== Track listing ==
Writing credits adapted from the album's liner notes.

Side one
No.	Title	Writer(s)	Length
1.	"Brats in Battalions"	Tony Montana, Rikk Agnew	2:33
2.	"I Love You"	Montana, R. Agnew	4:14
3.	"The Liar"	Montana, Steve Soto	1:59
4.	"Things Start Moving"	Montana, Frank Agnew, Steve Roberts	3:11
5.	"Do the Freddy"	Montana, R. Agnew, F. Agnew, James Diliberti	0:57
6.	"Losing Battle"	Montana, Soto, F. Agnew	1:36
7.	"The House of the Rising Sun"	traditional; arranged by the Adolescents	4:08

Side two
No.	Title	Writer(s)	Length
8.	"Peasant Song"	Montana, R. Agnew, F. Agnew	2:42
9.	"Skate Babylon"	Montana, Soto	2:50
10.	"Welcome to Reality"	Montana, Soto, F. Agnew	2:02
11.	"Marching with the Reich"	Montana, Soto	2:05
12.	"I Got a Right" (originally performed by the Stooges)	Iggy Pop, James Williamson	2:46
13.	"She Wolf"	Montana, Soto	4:14
Total length:			35:17

== Personnel ==
Credits adapted from the album's liner notes.

Band

- Tony Montana – lead vocals, producer, front cover concept
- Rikk Agnew – guitar, backing vocals, producer
- Steve Soto – bass guitar, backing vocals, producer
- Dan Colburn – guitar
- Sandy Hanson – drums, producer
- Alfie Agnew – guitar, backing vocals, producer

Additional musicians

- Mike McKnight – additional guitar on "The Liar"
- Vince Meghrouni – harmonica on "The House of the Rising Sun"

Production

- Gordon R. Cox – record producer
- Bob Brown – recording engineer
- Mike Sessa – recording engineer
- Eddie Schreyer – audio mastering

Artwork

- Chris Fuhrer – front cover and insert photographs
- Steve Martinez – art direction
