= Fastest thing alive =

Fastest thing alive may refer to:

- Fastest animals
- "The Fastest Thing Alive", unofficial title of the theme song for the TV series Sonic the Hedgehog

== See also ==
- The Fastest Kid Alive, an album
- Flash (DC Comics character), sometimes known as the fastest man alive
  - "Fastest Man Alive", an episode of The Flash television series
- List of world records in athletics
