= The Fastest Kid Alive =

Studio album by the Adolescents
- Released: June 3, 2011
- Studio: Exile on Mountain Street, Glendale, California
- Genre: Punk rock
- Length: 40:11
- Label: Concrete Jungle (0206556)

Adolescents chronology
Burning Heads / Adolescents (2009)	The Fastest Kid Alive (2011)	American Dogs in Europe (2012)

The Fastest Kid Alive is the fifth studio album by the American punk rock band the Adolescents, released in June 2011 on Concrete Jungle Records. It was the band's first album not to include at least one of the Agnew brothers (Rikk, Frank, and Alfie), and began a string of albums with singer Tony Reflex and bassist Steve Soto as the only constant members. The Fastest Kid Alive was the band's only album with guitarist Joe Harrison, and the first of two with guitarist Mike McKnight and drummer Armando Del Rio.

== Writing and recording ==
Following touring in support of their 2005 album OC Confidential, the Adolescents began working on material for their next album. In March 2007, bassist Steve Soto stated that he, singer Tony Reflex, guitarist Frank Agnew, and drummer Derek O'Brien were working on new songs and hoped to have an album out by the end of the year. That September the band released a cover version of the unrecorded Germs song "Beyond Hurt, Beyond Help" for the Japanese re-release of the 1996 Germs tribute album A Small Circle of Friends. The band toured internationally in December 2008, performing in Mexico, Spain, Germany, the Czech Republic, Italy, Germany, and Belgium, followed by a string of dates in California in January 2009. By that March they were rehearsing their new material and Reflex was writing lyrics, with plans to record in early April and have the album finished by May. The band traveled to Europe again in December 2009, touring France, Switzerland, and Spain. To coincide with this tour they released a split EP with French band Burning Heads, featuring the new songs "Serf City" and "One Nation, Under Siege".

The Fastest Kid Alive was recorded at Exile on Mountain Street in Glendale, California with recording engineer Chris Heckman. The band re-recorded "Serf City" and "One Nation, Under Siege" for the album. Recording was completed in May 2010. The album's title was taken from a scene in the 2007 film Superbad, in which the character Evan (played by Michael Cera) is chased by police officer Michaels (played by Seth Rogen); failing to catch Evan, Michaels exclaims "He's a freak! He's the fastest kid alive!" According to Reflex, the album's lyrics dealt with "what has been going on in the war atmosphere of the last few years."

Having completed recording, the Adolescents performed at the Punk Rock Bowling festival in Las Vegas and the City Underground Festival in San Francisco, both in May 2010. To promote the album, they released three new songs through streaming media that July—"Tokyo au Go-Go", "Peace Don't Cost a Thing", and "The Jefferson Memorial Dance Revolution"—and another three the following month: "Learning to Swim", "Inspiration", and "Serf City". After performing on the 2010 Warped Tour, the band embarked on a tour from November 2010 to January 2011 that began in California and took them to Brazil, Texas, and Florida.

The Fastest Kid Alive was released June 3, 2011 on German label Concrete Jungle Records. The Adolescents supported it with a tour from June through August that took them to Germany, France, Spain, the United Kingdom, Luxembourg, the Czech Republic, Belgium, Switzerland, Italy, Australia, and Japan.

== Track listing ==
All tracks are written by Tony Reflex and Steve Soto

No.	Title	Length
1.	"Operation FTW"	2:09
2.	"Inspiration"	2:57
3.	"Wars Aren't Won, Wars Are Fought"	3:29
4.	"One Nation, Under Siege"	2:36
5.	"Babylon by Bomb"	2:31
6.	"Too Fast, Too Loud"	2:00
7.	"Learning to Swim"	3:01
8.	"Can't Change the World with a Song"	3:53
9.	"Orange Crush"	1:57
10.	"Serf City"	3:12
11.	"The Jefferson Memorial Dance Revolution"	2:12
12.	"Tokyo au Go-Go"	1:28
13.	"No Child Left Behind"	2:43
14.	"Branded"	1:48
15.	"Peace Don't Cost a Thing"	4:15
Total length:		40:11

== Personnel ==
Credits adapted from the album's liner notes.

Band

- Tony Reflex – lead vocals
- Steve Soto – bass guitar, backing vocals
- Mike McKnight – guitar
- Joe Harrison – guitar
- Armando Del Rio – drums, backing vocals

Additional performers

- Greg Stocks – additional vocals

Production

- Chris Heckman – audio engineer
- Jim Monroe – audio mastering

Artwork

- Mario Riviere – artwork, layout
