= Welcome to Reality (EP) =

EP by the Adolescents
- Released: October 1981
- Recorded: July 1981
- Genre: Punk rock
- Length: 6:47
- Label: Frontier (101)
- Producer: Thom Wilson

Adolescents chronology
Adolescents (1981)	Welcome to Reality (1981)	Brats in Battalions (1987)

Welcome to Reality is an EP by the American punk rock band the Adolescents, released in October 1981 on Frontier Records. Recorded after guitarist Rikk Agnew left the group, it was their only release recorded with guitarist Steve Roberts. The band broke up in August 1981, and when the EP was released two months later it was not well received. When the Adolescents re-formed five years later, a new lineup re-recorded all three songs from Welcome to Reality for their reunion album, 1987's Brats in Battalions.

== Background and recording ==
The Adolescents lineup of singer Tony Brandenburg (who used the stage name Tony Cadena), bassist Steve Soto, drummer Casey Royer, and guitarist brothers Rikk and Frank Agnew released their debut album, Adolescents, in March 1981 on Frontier Records. Though Rikk Agnew had contributed heavily to the album, tensions between him and the other band members were leading to frequent arguments. Just a few months after the album's release, during a performance at the Starwood in West Hollywood, he abruptly threw his guitar and walked offstage, quitting the band. "Rikk and I began to have conflicting ideas and Rikk left, citing musical differences", said Brandenburg. He was replaced by Pat Smear, formerly of the Germs. The band was planning their first tour, to begin late that summer and last into the fall. "We needed to tour to survive", recalled Brandenburg. "We had been banned from every club in Hollywood that could hold us—the Starwood, the Roxy, and the Whisky—and a lot of people wouldn't go to Pasadena (Perkins Palace) or East L.A. (The Vex) to see us". Smear, however, did not want to tour, and so left the band in June after only three months to allow them to find a guitar player who would tour.

Smear's replacement was Royer's roommate Steve Roberts, and the new lineup recorded the Welcome to Reality EP that July. It was produced by Thom Wilson, who had engineered and mixed Adolescents, and consisted of three songs. A fourth song, "Richard Hung Himself", co-written by Royer, was recorded and intended for the EP but was left off before release. It was released 24 years later on The Complete Demos 1980–1986. The band broke up the following month, before Welcome to Reality was released and before the planned tour had begun. Brandenburg later cited disagreements over the band's direction and his personal discomfort with their sudden popularity as reasons for the breakup.

== Release and reception ==
Welcome to Reality was released in October 1981 on Frontier Records, but was not well received. "It went over like a lead balloon and we threw in the towel", said Brandenburg. In a retrospective review, Ned Raggett of Allmusic rated it two stars out of five, commenting that "the title track is a fairly indifferent fear-of-the-bomb rant, while 'Losing Battle' and 'Things Start Moving' have the same general pace of the band's best early songs, though not the same immediate memorability (even if the latter has an attractive, slightly droning guitar opening). It's a bit of a nothing way of bowing out."

== Legacy ==
After the Adolescents' breakup, Brandenburg formed a new band, the Abandoned, who released one album, Killed by Faith (1985). Soto and Frank Agnew joined Los Angeles punk band Legal Weapon, playing on their 1982 album Death of Innocence; Agnew remained with them for Your Weapon, released later that year, then moved on to Hvy Drt, playing on their 1985 Hvy Drt EP. Royer, meanwhile, started D.I., taking on the role of singer. He was joined by Roberts and Rikk Agnew for the D.I. EP (1983), which included a new version of "Richard Hung Himself" rewritten by Royer with new lyrics. Agnew then brought in his younger brother, Alfie Agnew, and the two remained in D.I. until 1987, playing on the albums Ancient Artifacts (1985) and Horse Bites Dog Cries (1986) and the Team Goon EP (1987).

The Adolescents lineup of Brandenburg (now using the stage name Tony Montana), Soto, Royer, and Rikk and Frank Agnew played a reunion show in April 1986 at Fender's Ballroom in Long Beach, California which led to the band re-forming. They played more shows and began working on material for a new album, but Frank Agnew left the band after a few months and was replaced by his younger brother Alfie, then Royer left the group that August and was replaced by Sandy Hanson, formerly of the Mechanics. "Casey wanted to keep D.I. going, and I lost interest", said Frank. The new lineup recorded the Brats in Battalions album that summer, including new recordings of all three songs from Welcome to Reality. Songs from Welcome to Reality are performed on each of the band's live albums: All three songs appear on Live 1981 & 1986 (1989), "Welcome to Reality" and "Losing Battle" appear on Return to the Black Hole (1997), and "Welcome to Reality" and "Things Start Moving" appear on Live at the House of Blues (2004). The Welcome to Reality tracks were re-released on the compact disc version of Adolescents published by Frontier Records in 1990.

== Track listing ==
Writing credits adapted from the EP's liner notes.

Side one
No.	Title	Writer(s)	Length
1.	"Welcome to Reality"	Steve Soto, Tony Cadena, Frank Agnew	2:10
2.	"Losing Battle"	Soto, Cadena, Agnew	1:32

Side two
No.	Title	Writer(s)	Length
3.	"Things Start Moving"	Cadena, Agnew, Steve Roberts	3:05
Total length:			6:47

== Personnel ==
Credits adapted from the EP's liner notes.

Band

- Tony Cadena – vocals
- Frank Agnew – guitar
- Steve Roberts – guitar
- Steve Soto – bass guitar
- Casey Royer – drums

Production

- Thom Wilson – record producer

Artwork

- Edward Colver – cover photograph
- Diane Zincavage – artwork
