= Amoeba (song) =

Song by Adolescents

from the album Adolescents
- Released: April 1981
- Recorded: March 1981
- Genre: Punk rock, hardcore punk
- Length: 3:07
- Label: Frontier
- Songwriter(s): Rikk Agnew, Casey Royer, Tom Corvin
- Producer(s): Mike Patton

"Amoeba" is a song by American punk rock band the Adolescents. It is the eighth track on their self-titled debut album Adolescents, released in April 1981 on Frontier Records. It is the band's signature song.

An earlier version of the song was recorded in 1980 for inclusion on KROQ-FM disc jockey Rodney Bingenheimer's Rodney on the ROQ compilation album, released by Posh Boy Records in November 1980. This version became a hit on KROQ and led to the band's signing to Frontier Records in January 1981. Posh Boy owner Robbie Fields presented the band with gold singles for the track at a show at the Starwood in West Hollywood in early 1981, and the label later released this version of the song as a single in 1990.

== Background ==
"Amoeba" was one of several Adolescents songs that were written by rhythm guitarist Rikk Agnew and drummer Casey Royer for their prior group, the Detours. The original version of the song was written for Agnew and Royer's previous band Social Distortion, with lyrics written by Royer and also partially by original Social Distortion lead vocalist Tom Corvin and music composed by their Social Distortion bandmate Mike Ness. After Royer and Agnew left Social Distortion to play in the Detours and the Adolescents, Ness rewrote the lyrics to the music he composed, turning it into 1945, while Agnew composed new music for Royer's lyrics.

== Reception ==
AllMusic described the song as a "classic" when reviewing the album.

== In popular culture ==
The song was featured in the video games Tony Hawk's Pro Skater 3 (2001), Grand Theft Auto V (2013) and Call of Duty: Black Ops Cold War (2020).

== Covers ==
In 2009, Mark Hoppus and Travis Barker of Blink-182 covered "Amoeba" for the soundtrack to the film Endless Bummer.
