= Cropduster (Adolescents album) =

Studio album by Adolescents
- Released: 20 July 2018
- Genre: Punk rock
- Label: Concrete Jungle Records

Adolescents chronology
Manifest Density (2016)	Cropduster (2018)	Russian Spider Dump (2020)

Cropduster is the ninth studio album by the American punk band Adolescents. The record was released on 20 July 2018 on the label Concrete Jungle Records.

The album was recorded with original member Steve Soto, but Soto died at age 54 before the album saw its release. Thus it was the last album Soto appeared on.

== Reception ==
Razorcake praised the album as "the Adolescents at their finest".

In Germany, where the album was distributed by Edel Records, Rock Hard gave 7.5 out of 10 points, and Powermetal.de gave 8.5 points. The latter noted that "the band still has plenty of fire, carrying the raw, original spirit of punk rock into their songs". Every song was worthy of recommendation. Visions echoed that the album contained choruses which "still exude the same infectious passion as they did in the early '80s". That being said, the rewiever did not find the album noticeably better or worse than the rest of Adolescents' 2010s output. Ox-Fanzine featured two reviews, one of them bestowing 4 out of 5 stars on Cropduster. It was a "high point in the Adolescents' discography", being as "catchy and powerful" as the reviewer never had heard the band before. The other reviewer opined that some of the 18 songs were probably skippable, but that punk rock fans "should easily be able to identify a dozen genuine hits". Count Your Bruises Magazine's reviewer found the lyrics very pertinent to modern American society: "The entire spectrum of 21st-century American madness is tackled song by song".

== Artwork ==
The cover artist was Mario Riviere. Wrote Visions, "Some might find Mario Riviere's cover art a bit too comedic, but it fits perfectly into the discography of the band's third phase".
