= La Vendetta... =

Studio album by Adolescents
- Released: July 11, 2014
- Genre: Punk rock
- Length: 35:36
- Label: Concrete Jungle Records
- Producers: Paul Miner; Steve Soto

Adolescents chronology
Presumed Insolent (2013)	La Vendetta... (2014)	Manifest Density (2016)

Professional ratings
Review scores
Source	Rating
Classic Rock	3.5/5 stars
Punknews	3.5/5 stars
Ox-Fanzine	4/5 stars
Rock Hard	8/10
Powermetal.de	8/10

La Vendetta... is the seventh studio album by American hardcore punk band the Adolescents. The record was released on July 11, 2014, via Concrete Jungle Records label.

== Track listing ==
No.	Title	Length
1.	"Monolith at the Mountlake Terrace"	1:19
2.	"A Dish Best Served Cold"	2:17
3.	"Bulletproof"	2:05
4.	"Double Down"	2:34
5.	"Fukushima Lemon Twist"	1:35
6.	"The Last Laugh"	2:38
7.	"30 Seconds to Malibu"	2:23
8.	"Silent Water"	2:43
9.	"Talking to Myself"	2:43
10.	"Formula 13"	1:39
11.	"Rinse Cycle"	2:28
12.	"Ricochet Heart"	1:53
13.	"Nothing Left to Say"	2:24
14.	"Sludge"	2:50
15.	"Sanctuary & the High Cost of Misery"	1:49
16.	"Let It Go"	2:16
Total length:		35:36

== Personnel ==
- Leroy Merlin - rhythm guitar
- Paul Miner - producer, engineer, mastering, mixing, backing vocals
- Tony Reflex - lead vocals
- Mario Riviere - artwork
- Dan Root - backing vocals, lead guitar
- Efrem Martinez Schulz - backing vocals
- Steve Soto - bass, producer, backing vocals
- Greg Stocks - backing vocals
- Martin Wegner - mastering (vinyl)
