= Balboa Fun*Zone =

Studio album by the Adolescents
- Released: 1988
- Studio: Casbah Recording Studio, Fullerton, California
- Genre: Punk rock
- Length: 43:32 (LP, cassette); 52:50 (CD)
- Label: Triple X (51010)
- Producer: Chaz Ramirez, Rikk Agnew, Steve Soto, Frank Agnew, Sandy Hanson

Adolescents chronology
Brats in Battalions (1987)	Balboa Fun*Zone (1988)	Live 1981 & 1986 (1989)

Balboa Fun*Zone is the third studio album by the American punk rock band the Adolescents, released in 1988 on Triple X Records. Titled after the Balboa Fun Zone amusement area of Balboa Peninsula, Newport Beach, it is the band's only album recorded without singer Tony Brandenburg, who had left the group the prior year. Electing not to replace him, guitarist Rikk Agnew and bassist Steve Soto alternated lead vocals on Balboa Fun*Zone. The album also features the return of original Adolescents guitarist Frank Agnew (Rikk Agnew's younger brother), who had been absent from their prior album, 1987's Brats in Battalions. Balboa Fun*Zone is also the final Adolescents studio album to include Rikk Agnew and drummer Sandy Hanson. The band broke up in April 1989, reuniting in later years with different lineups.

== Background and recording ==
The Adolescents had spent much of 1987 touring in support of their second album, Brats in Battalions, but by the end of that year singer Tony Brandenburg and guitarist Dan Colburn both left the band. Brandenburg stated in 1989, "I was interested in other things (I had joined another band, the Flower Leperds), and the Adolescents touring cut into my school work". Bassist Steve Soto said there were also disagreements between Brandenburg and the other band members over taking the band's music in a more melodic direction. Soto, guitarist Rikk Agnew, and drummer Sandy Hanson decided to continue as the Adolescents, with Soto and Agnew sharing lead vocal duties. They recruited guitarist Paul Casey, who left after a few months of touring. Rikk's younger brother Frank Agnew, who had been one of the band's founding guitarists and had left a few months after their 1986 reunion, rejoined the group.

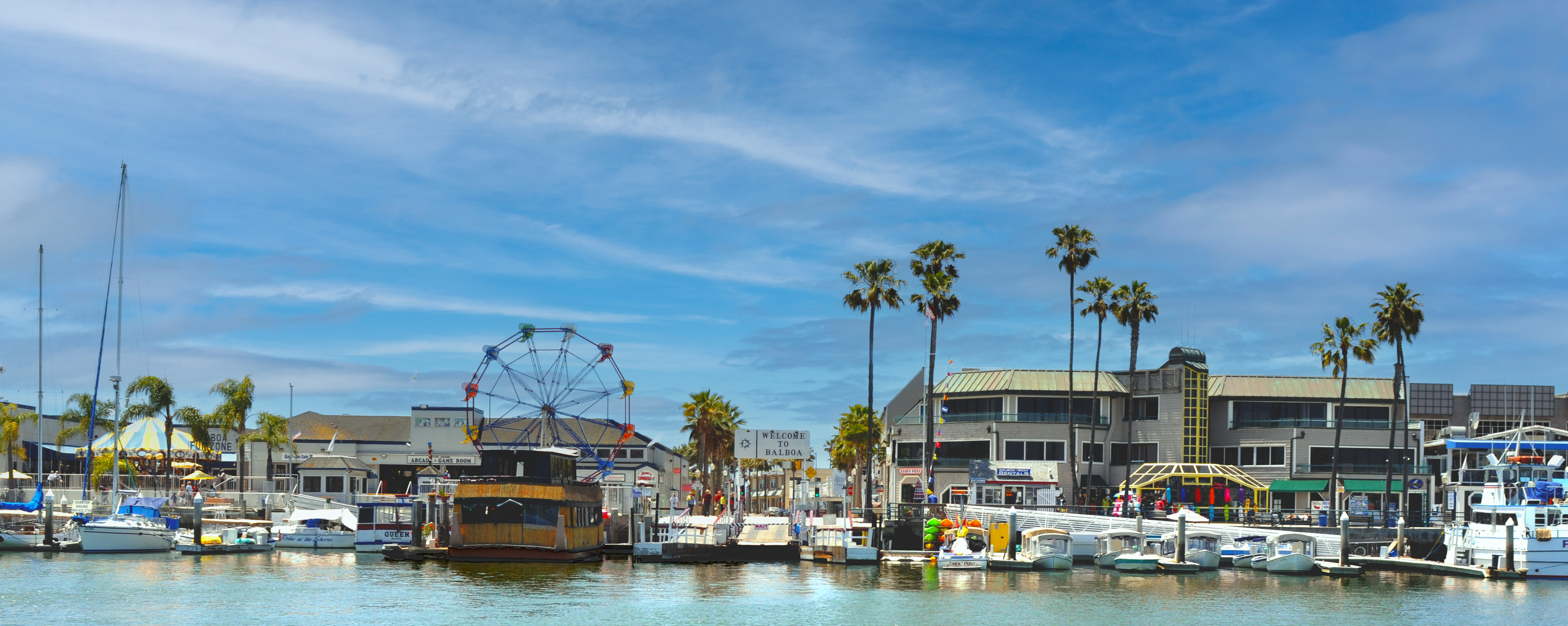
The album is titled after the Balboa Fun Zone amusement area of Balboa Peninsula, Newport Beach (pictured in 2010). The album cover is a photograph of the Fun Zone taken at night, showing the lights from the Ferris wheel and other attractions.

Soto and Rikk Agnew wrote the material for the band's next album, moving away from the Adolescents' prior hardcore punk sound and themes of politics and adolescent desperation in favor of exploring more openly melodic pop rock influences and writing songs that reflected their personal experiences. "Punk, which started out as being a totally liberating kind of music, can put a lock on you", Soto said. Agnew agreed: "The original idea of punk was individuality and breaking limits. So why not go out and break your own limits?"

They titled the album and its opening and closing tracks after the Balboa Fun Zone, an amusement area of Balboa Peninsula, Newport Beach, even though they had not visited there regularly and Hanson and Frank Agnew had never been there. "Balboa Fun Zone (Riot at the Beach)" was written by Soto to evoke the wildness of the band's early days, set to a fast punk beat with lyrics chronicling rioting that took place there in April 1987 involving about 700 youths. Soto had not experienced the riot, but based his lyrics on newspaper accounts. He also wrote "Allen Hotel", about a hotel in the band's hometown of Fullerton, California that was populated by drunks and drug addicts. "It's one of those last-chance hotels," he said, "the kind of place you could live in if you didn't have a job and you were scrounging on the street. People I knew that were into drugs and drinking, sure enough some of them started moving in there. It went from being a scary place to a possibility, and that was a scary thought. If I'd kept on doing the things I was doing, I would have been there myself, and so would everyone in the band. Fortunately for us, we didn't let it get that far. We woke up to it." Soto also wrote the album's closing song, "Balboa Fun Zone (It's in Your Touch)", a drastic departure from the Adolescents' earlier work due to it being a folk rock number played on acoustic guitars with lyrical singing about putting a past phase of life behind and looking toward the future.

Rikk Agnew's songwriting contributions included "Just Like Before"; written about his longstanding relationship with his girlfriend, it begins with anger over problems in a relationship but then transitions to calm reflection about how the romance endures despite the ongoing friction. Agnew said the lyrics could also apply to the Adolescents' career, since the band broke up in 1981 when the members were young and immature, but now had a chance to grow as they became adults. He commented, "Being a little older, you can realize that when one member is ragging on the others about the music, it has nothing to do with anything personal. Instead of having obstinate egos, we just have strong egos." He also wrote "It's Tattoo Time" about his fondness for tattoos—by 1988, he had over 30 tattoos on his body. The song's bridge features the sound of a tattoo machine; this was a recording of Agnew having his arm tattooed by artist Mark Mahoney.

Balboa Fun*Zone was recorded at Casbah Recording Studio in Fullerton with recording engineer Chaz Ramirez, and was co-produced by Ramirez and the band members. The band included a cover version of the John Lennon song "Instant Karma!" The album was mastered by Eddie Schreyer at Capitol Studios. Danny Dorrance designed the album cover, using photographs taken by Kim Dorrance: the front cover features a night view of the Balboa Fun Zone with its Ferris wheel and other attractions aglow with decorative lighting, while the back cover incorporates a photograph of the Fun Zone's old-fashioned carousel.

== Release and reception ==
Balboa Fun*Zone was released in 1988 on Triple X Records in LP, cassette, and compact disc formats, and was given a European release by Roadrunner Records. The CD version includes three additional tracks: "Runaway"; "She Walks Alone"; and "Surf Yogi", an instrumental interpretation of "If I Were a Rich Man" from the 1964 musical Fiddler on the Roof. Interviewing the Adolescents prior to an October 1988 performance in Huntington Beach, California, Mike Boehm of the Los Angeles Times called the album "excellent" and opined that it found the band "turning into adults, appreciating the deeper perspective that growing up brings, yet still cherishing the vibrancy they knew as young punk rockers." Ten years later, he included it in a list of "Essential Albums, '78–'98" giving an overview of Orange County punk and alternative rock, saying that it "[took] the Adolescents to musical adulthood that marked Soto's emergence as a significant singing and songwriting talent", but also that it was "a noble failure, too advanced for fans who craved the hard-and-fast stuff, and too ahead of its time for the wave that would lift pop-buoyed punk into the mainstream during the 1990s."

In a retrospective review, Stewart Mason of AllMusic gave Balboa Fun*Zone 3 stars out of 5 and said that Soto and Rikk Agnew's split songwriting and vocal performances "[give] the album an appealingly varied sound that ranges from the anthemic rocker 'Just Like Before' to the engagingly loose, Johnny Thunders-like 'It's Tattoo Time'. Best of the lot are the two entirely different tunes named after the album title, the smoking hardcore 'Balboa Fun Zone (Riot on the Beach)" and the much poppier, '60s-inspired 'Balboa Fun Zone (It's in Your Touch)'. Worst of the lot is a sloppy, basically pointless cover of John Lennon's 'Instant Karma!' Although there's little that truly stands out besides Agnew's anti-drug anthem 'Alone Against the World', the album is so consistently rocking and good-humored that it's a more entertaining listen than their uneven earlier records."

== Legacy ==
Balboa Fun*Zone was the Adolescents' final studio album released during the 1980s. The band broke up in April 1989, and the members moved on to other projects. Soto, Hanson, and Frank Agnew started a band called Joyride in 1992. Agnew soon left to focus on his family life and maintained a low-profile musical career, playing on albums by Tender Fury, Rule 62, and Mr. Mirainga. Soto and Hanson kept Joyride going until the mid-1990s, then formed the band 22 Jacks. Rikk Agnew, meanwhile, briefly rejoined the gothic rock band Christian Death and released two solo albums between 1990 and 1992. Also in 1992, Rikk and Frank Agnew joined Tony Brandenburg and other Southern California punk musicians for Pinups, an album of cover versions of punk rock songs from the 1970s and early 1980s on which Soto sang backing vocals. That same year, Brandenburg, Rikk Agnew, and former Adolescents drummer Casey Royer also formed ADZ; the group's name was a shortened form of Adolescents. Royer and Agnew both left after the band's first album, Where Were You? (1992).

The Adolescents lineup of Brandenburg, Soto, Royer, and Rikk and Frank Agnew reunited in 2001, though Rikk Agnew left by late 2003 and Frank Agnew in 2006. From 2008 to 2018, Brandenburg and Soto had been the band's sole constant members and primary songwriters until Soto's death, where Brandenburg has continued to release albums as the Adolescents with anchoring lineups as the only constant member. Songs from Balboa Fun*Zone do not appear on any of the Adolescents' live albums released after their 1989 breakup.

Since 2022, the first track and one of the title tracks off the album, Balboa Fun Zone (Riot on the Beach), has been incorporated into some of the band's touring setlists.

== Track listing ==
Writing and lead vocal credits adapted from the album's liner notes.

All tracks are written by Rikk Agnew and Steve Soto, except where noted.

Side one
No.	Title	Lead vocalist	Length
1.	"Balboa Fun Zone (Riot on the Beach)"	Steve Soto	3:02
2.	"Just Like Before" (written by Agnew and Dan Colburn)	Rikk Agnew	3:27
3.	"Instant Karma!" (written by John Lennon; originally performed by Lennon and Yoko Ono with the Plastic Ono Band)	Soto	3:13
4.	"Alone Against the World"	Agnew	4:19
5.	"Allen Hotel"	Soto	3:26
6.	"Frustrated"	Soto, Agnew	3:14

Side two
No.	Title	Lead vocalist	Length
7.	"Genius in Pain"	Agnew	3:37
8.	"It's Tattoo Time"	Agnew	3:34
9.	"'Til She Comes Down"	Soto	4:11
10.	"Modern Day Napoleon"	Agnew	3:38
11.	"I'm a Victim"	Soto	4:37
12.	"Balboa Fun Zone (It's in Your Touch)"	Soto	3:14
Total length:			43:32

Additional tracks on CD release
No.	Title	Lead vocalist	Length
13.	"Runaway"	Agnew	4:34
14.	"She Walks Alone"	Soto	3:26
15.	"Surf Yogi" (interpretation of "If I Were a Rich Man", written by Sheldon Harnick and Jerry Bock)	instrumental	1:18
Total length:			52:50

== Personnel ==
Credits adapted from the album's liner notes.

Band

- Rikk Agnew – guitar; producer; lead vocals on tracks 2, 4, 6, 7, 8, 10, and 13
- Steve Soto – bass guitar; producer; lead vocals on tracks 1, 3, 5, 6, 9, 11, 12, and 14
- Frank Agnew – guitar, producer
- Sandy Hanson – drums, producer

Additional performers

- Mark Mahoney – tattoo machine on "It's Tattoo Time"
- Thee Bretheren Percussio – percussion instruments on "Frustrated"

Production

- Chaz Ramirez – recording engineer, producer, Hammond organ on "I'm a Victim"
- Eddie Schreyer – audio mastering

Artwork

- Danny T. Dorrance – cover design
- Kim J. Dorrance – photographs
