= Presumed Insolent =

Studio album by Adolescents
- Released: July 26, 2013
- Genre: Punk rock
- Length: 32:55
- Label: Concrete Jungle
- Producer: Jim Monroe; Steve Soto

Adolescents chronology
The Fastest Kid Alive (2011)	Presumed Insolent (2013)	La Vendetta... (2014)

Presumed Insolent is the sixth studio album by American hardcore punk band the Adolescents. The record was released on July 26, 2013 via Concrete Jungle label.

== Track listing ==
All tracks written by Tony Reflex and Steve Soto, except where noted.

No.	Title	Writer(s)	Length
1.	"The Athena Decree"		2:14
2.	"Conquest of the Planet of the See Monkeys"		2:46
3.	"Forever Summer"		2:04
4.	"Riptide"		2:42
5.	"In This Town Everything Is Wonderful"	Reflex; Soto; Mia Brandenburg	2:15
6.	"Big Rock Shock"	Reflex/Root	1:21
7.	"Dissatisfaction Guaranteed"		2:56
8.	"Presumed Insolent"	Reflex; Soto; Brandenburg	2:23
9.	"Broken Window"	Reflex; Soto; Brandenburg	3:20
10.	"300 Cranes"		2:47
11.	"Snaggletooth and Nail"		2:00
12.	"Daisy's Revenge"		2:45
13.	"Tic Tac at the Alligator Tree"		3:22
Total length:			32:55

== Personnel ==
- Tony Cadena - vocals, lyrics
- Steve Soto - bass, lyrics, production
- Mike McKnight - guitar
- Dan Root - guitar
- Armando del Rio - drums
- Jim Monroe - mixing, recording, production
- Mia Brandenburg - lyrics
- Mario Rivière - artwork
- Josue Rivas - photographer
