= Ian Taylor (musician) =

American musician

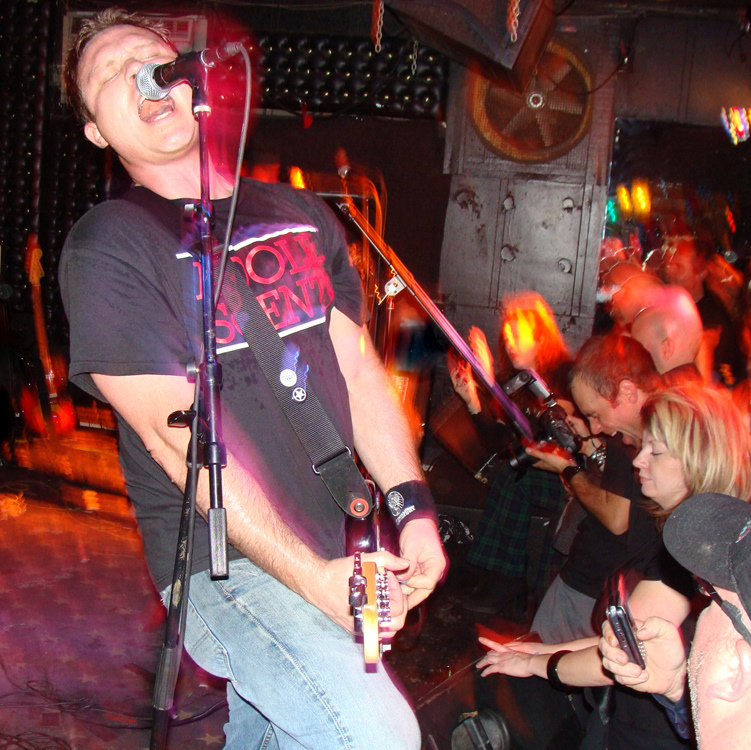

Background information
- Also known as: Ian Taylor
- Born: Ian Flannon Taylor; November 21, 1971 (age 54); Palm Desert, California
- Origin: Lake Arrowhead, California, United States
- Genres: Punk rock, skate punk, rock and roll, hard rock
- Occupation: Musician
- Instrument: Guitar

Ian Flannon Taylor (born November 21, 1971) is an American musician from Palm Desert, California. Taylor plays rhythm guitar in The Adolescents and was the long-time guitarist for Mondo Generator. Taylor was the front-man for 1990s San Diego skate punk band Furious IV and UNSOUND, (an early 1990s influential punk rock band from Palm Springs/Palm Desert, CA) and key member of what became known as the "Low Desert Sound".

In 2011, Taylor released a solo record titled The Sounds Between Us. Taylor owns a carpentry company called "Taylor Design And Build", which specializes in custom furniture, ADA modifications for local businesses, as well as scenery for theaters and television shows. In 2014, Taylor was tapped by veteran punk rock band the Adolescents by founding member Tony Cadena A.K.A Tony Montana A.K.A Tony Reflex to play guitar on tour. As of summer 2015, he is a full-time member of the band.
