= Adolescents (band) =

American punk rock band

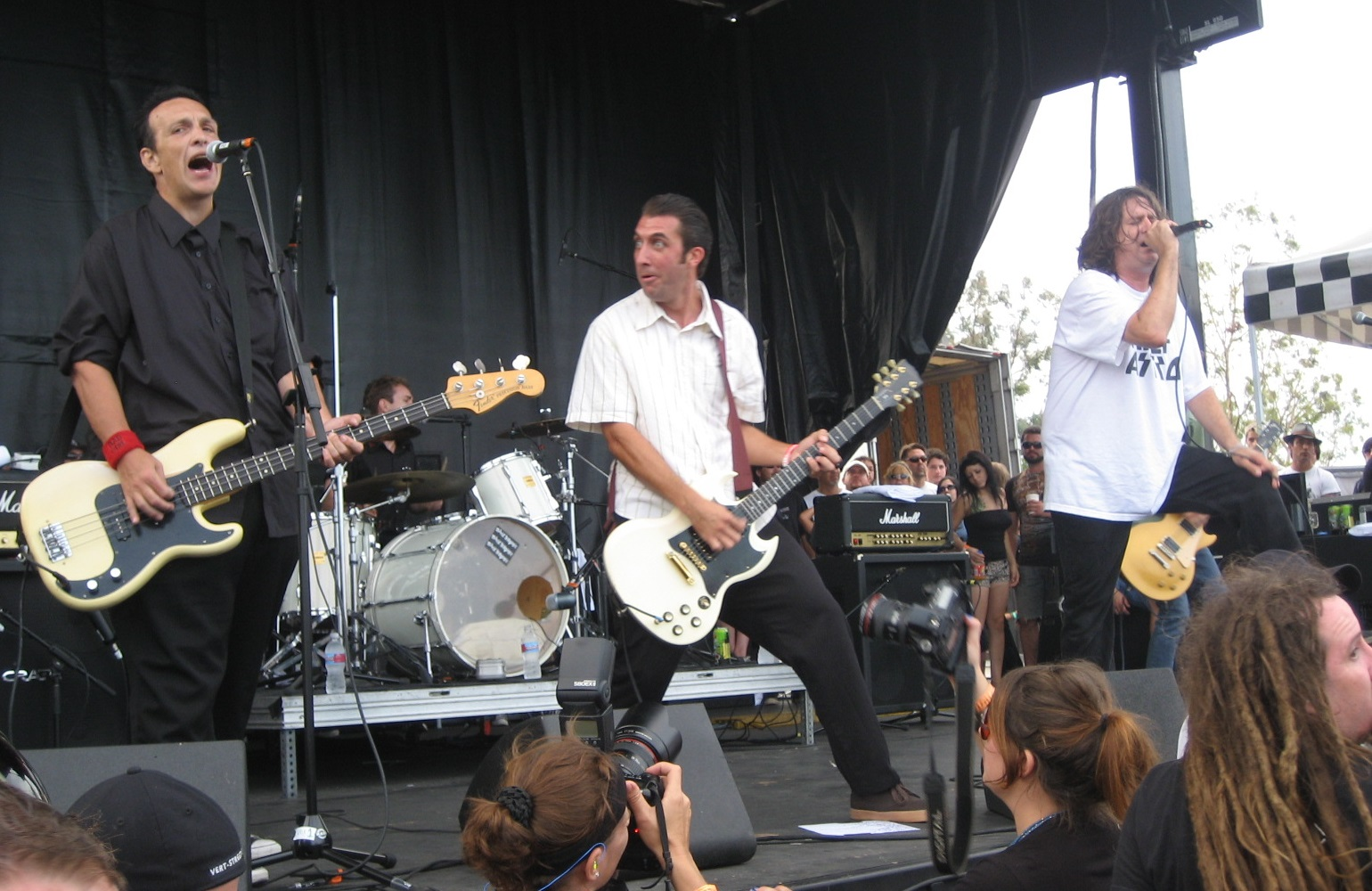
- The Adolescents in 2007 at Warped Tour

Background information
- Origin: Fullerton, California, United States
- Genres: Hardcore punk; punk rock
- Years active: 1979–1981; 1986–1989; 2001–present
- Labels: Posh Boy; Frontier; SOS; Triple X; Finger; Concrete Jungle
- Spinoffs: D.I.
- Spinoff of: Social Distortion
- Members: Tony Reflex; Dan Root; Mike Cambra; Ian Taylor; Brad Logan
- Past members: Steve Soto; Frank Agnew; John O'Donovan; Jeff Chaney; Rikk Agnew; Casey Royer; Pat Smear; Steve Roberts; Alfie Agnew; Sandy Hansen; Dan Colburn; Paul Casey; Derek O'Brien; Frank Agnew, Jr.; Joe Harrison; Mike McKnight; Armando del Río; Leroy Merlin
- Website: https://www.theadolescents.net/

The Adolescents are an American punk rock band formed in Fullerton, California in 1979. Part of the hardcore punk movement in southern California in the early 1980s, they were one of the main punk acts to emerge from Orange County, along with their peers in Agent Orange and Social Distortion. Founding bassist Steve Soto was the sole constant member of the band since its inception until his 2018 death, with singer Tony Reflex being in the group for all but one album.

During the 1980s the band went through several lineup changes, breakups, and reunions, most involving drummer Casey Royer and guitarist brothers Rikk, Frank, and Alfie Agnew. During that decade, they released three albums: Adolescents (1981), Brats in Battalions (1987), and Balboa Fun*Zone (1988, without Reflex), then broke up in April 1989. Most of the members remained active in other musical projects, and a reunion of most of the early members in 2001 resulted in the comeback album OC Confidential (2005). Soto and Reflex ultimately became the band's only constant members and primary songwriters. Adolescents released five more studio albums between 2011 and 2018: The Fastest Kid Alive (2011), Presumed Insolent (2013), La Vendetta... (2014), Manifest Density (2016), and Cropduster (2018). On June 27, 2018, Soto died at the age of 54, leaving Reflex as the only original founding member. Brad Logan replaced Soto and the band's tenth album, Russian Spider Dump, was released in October 2020. The band released their eleventh album, Caesar Salad Days, in July 2023.

== History ==
=== Formation and first recordings: 1980 ===
Prior to forming the Adolescents, the early band members were part of various formative punk rock groups in Fullerton, California during their teenage years in the late 1970s: Guitarist Rikk Agnew and drummer Casey Royer had played in the Detours and with Agnew's younger brother Frank in the early lineup of Social Distortion, while bassist Steve Soto was a founding member of Agent Orange. Soto met Tony Brandenburg at an Agent Orange show in November 1979, and the two, both aged 16, formed a bond, as Soto recalled: "I struck up a conversation with Tony. He was out of control and we became fast friends". "We would talk about music and the problems we were having in high school and about our weight problems", Brandenburg later recalled; "We found that we had a lot in common weight-wise—we were polar opposites [Soto was overweight while Brandenburg was tall and thin]—but neither of us could change it. All of our problems on the high school scene were caused by our musical taste and our weight. We were the object of constant ridicule, but what was worse was we couldn't get girls".

Soto thought Brandenburg would make a good singer, and suggested this to Rikk Agnew, who at the time used the stage name General Hospital (after the television show). Soto said: "The General was going to start a new band and I suggested Tony as the singer. He was into the idea but for some reason he ended up reuniting with his old band the Detours instead." Soto left Agent Orange in late 1979 because bandleader Mike Palm wouldn't include Soto's songs in the band's set, and started a new band in January 1980 with Brandenburg, who used the stage name Tony Cadena. Soto invited Rikk Agnew to join them in the group; he declined but suggested his younger brother Frank. "[Frank] was 15," recalled Brandenburg; "Steve told Frank that he was putting together a band and I was going to sing. Frank thought I was kinda weird but decided to try it out anyway". The lineup was completed with guitarist John O'Donovan and drummer Greg Williams (who went by the stage name Peter Pan), and the new group began practicing, first in Williams' garage and then at the Detours' rehearsal space, a modified chicken coop behind a house. "The band made life liveable", recalled Brandenburg; "High school was still hell, and when a couple of people found out I was in a punk band the ridicule escalated".

The group began performing as the Adolescents, a name taken from an all-female band from Petaluma who had discarded it. Their first show was in early 1980 at a Boys Club in Yorba Linda, playing with Social Distortion and Agent Orange. "We played six songs, all originals", said Brandenburg; "This is the irony of punk in Orange County: The only bands that played their own material were beginning punk bands. All the rock bands played cover songs". The Adolescents also played at Soto's high school (El Dorado High School in Placentia) and O'Donavan's (Servite High School in Anaheim), the latter ending chaotically. Brandenburg recalled: "John set up the gig. We played at lunch. We were pelted with garbage and the set ended with me insulting them through the P.A. I kept asking 'Where are your girlfriends?' and calling them fags. John was suspended and Servite swore there would never be another rock and roll band allowed there". The band recorded their first demo tape that March in Brandenburg's mother's garage in Anaheim, and played their first show with Los Angeles bands the following month, opening for the Germs at the Fleetwood in Redondo Beach. They recorded a second demo that May at a studio in Midway City, including the songs "I Hate Children", "No Friends", "Who Is Who", and "Wrecking Crew". The recordings of "Who Is Who" and "Wrecking Crew" from this tape were released two years later on BYO Records' inaugural release, the compilation album Someone Got Their Head Kicked In!; these were the only recordings released by the Adolescents' original lineup until 2005's The Complete Demos 1980–1986.

O'Donovan and Williams both left the band in June 1980. Soto later recalled "John was more concerned with acting like Johnny Thunders instead of playing like him, and Pan refused to shave his sorry excuse of a teenage mustache. I think Pan's girlfriend was supposed to pay for our first demo and then pleaded broke when it came time to pay the man". Rikk Agnew joined the band, initially as drummer: "Rikk started as our drummer and let me tell you, as a drummer Rikk was second only to Keith Moon", said Brandenburg; "He didn't have much of a drum kit...we had to borrow stuff at gigs, and Rikk kept breaking stuff that belonged to other people (he had this bad habit of kicking the drum kit over). For the sake of survival in an environment of increasingly hostile peer-bands, Rikk switched over to guitar, and Rikk's ex-Detours bandmate 'Uncle' Casey Royer joined on drums". Rikk and Royer brought with them several songs written for the Detours, including "Amoeba", "No Way", "Creatures", "Rip It Up", and "Kids of the Black Hole". "With the addition of Rikk and Casey, we'd moved to the next level", recalled Frank Agnew, "They were older and more experienced, so we improved quickly".

KROQ-FM disc jockey Rodney Bingenheimer played the band's second demo tape on his "Rodney on the ROQ" program showcasing local punk acts, giving them the encouragement to record another. They recorded a third demo that July with Chaz Ramirez and Eddie Joseph of local band Eddie and the Subtitles as audio engineers. This demo included "Creatures", "Amoeba", "Self Destruct", and "Do the Eddie", a joke song written about Joseph. Joseph became the band's manager and began shopping their demo to local record labels. "He even got us an advance check that he promptly cashed and left town...Thanks Eddie", Soto later recalled. The Adolescents continued performing locally and gained in popularity. "After the second party in a row we played turned into a bloodbath/riot (punks and longhairs fighting, then the cops coming and beating everyone up) we quit playing parties", said Brandenburg. "We had popularity with people in the Hollywood crowd because we'd stand up to our audience if they got violent, and wouldn't hesitate to stop a show if there was a fight. We felt it was inappropriate for punks to be fighting punks".

Bingenheimer approached the band to record a track for his Rodney on the ROQ compilation album (Posh Boy Records, 1980), which featured other Los Angeles and Orange County bands including Agent Orange, Black Flag, and the Circle Jerks. The Adolescents provided a recording of "Amoeba" which became a hit on KROQ that December; Posh Boy owner Robbie Fields presented them with gold singles for the track at a show at the Starwood in West Hollywood in early 1981, and the label later released this version of the song as a single in 1990 and included as a soundtrack for Sony PlayStation Tony Hawk's Pro Skater video game. The Adolescents also opened for the Germs at the Germs' final show, on December 3, 1980 at the Starwood.

=== First album, Welcome to Reality EP, and breakup: 1981–1985 ===
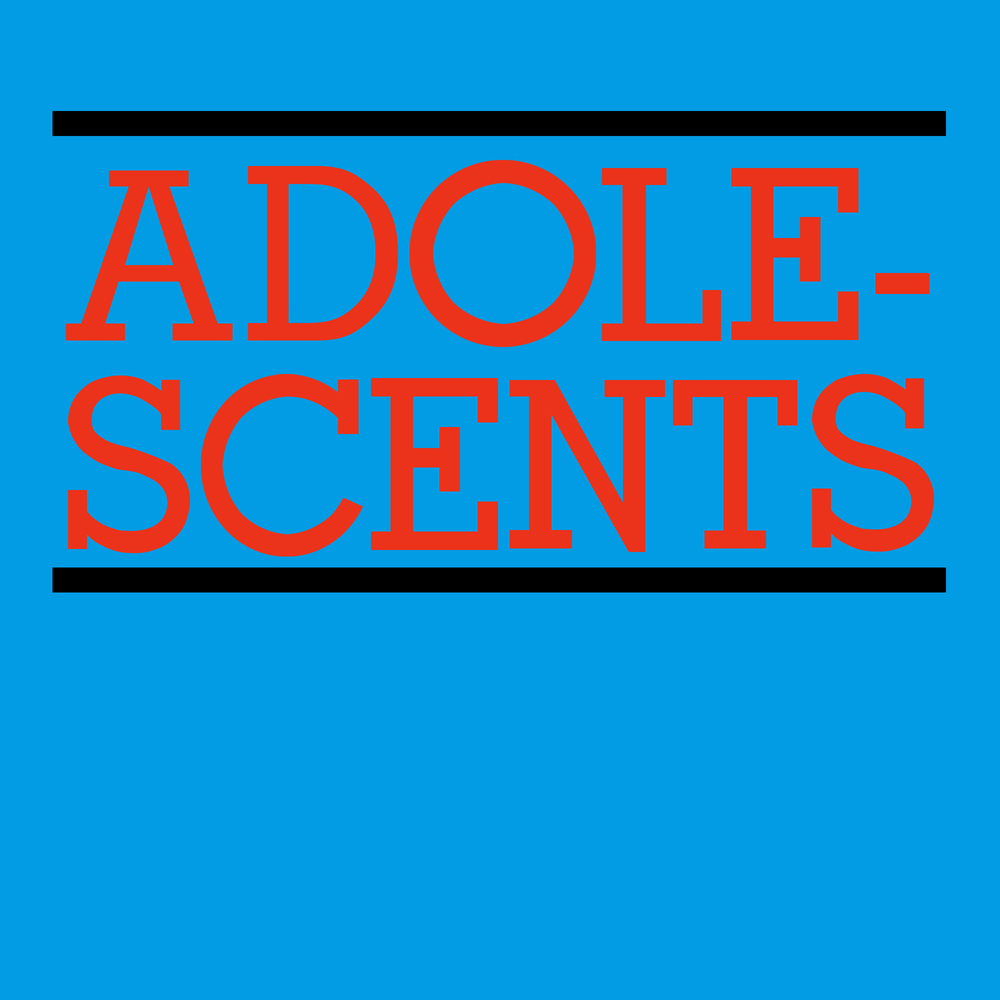
The band's first album, Adolescents (1981), also known as the "blue album".

The band gained the attention of local label Frontier Records, who signed them in January 1981. That March the Adolescents recorded their debut album, Adolescents, also known as The Blue Album due to its simple blue cover with the band's name in red typeface. Engineered and mixed by Thom Wilson and produced by Middle Class bassist Mike Patton, it was recorded, mixed, and mastered in only four days and featured most of the band's oeuvre at the time, including songs from their demos and Royer and Rikk Agnew's Detours songs. Released the following month, it was one of the first hardcore punk records to be widely distributed throughout the United States, and became one of the best-selling California hardcore albums behind the Dead Kennedys' Fresh Fruit for Rotting Vegetables (1980), selling over 10,000 copies.

Though Rikk Agnew had contributed heavily to the album, tensions between him and the other band members were leading to frequent arguments. Just a few months after the album's release, during a performance at the Starwood, he abruptly threw his guitar and walked offstage, quitting the band. "Rikk and I began to have conflicting ideas and Rikk left, citing musical differences", said Brandenburg. Rikk briefly rejoined the Detours until their breakup in 1982, then joined the gothic rock band Christian Death, playing on their 1982 album Only Theatre of Pain, and released a solo album, All by Myself (1982). He was replaced in the Adolescents by Pat Smear, formerly of the Germs. The band was planning their first tour, to begin late that summer and last into the fall. "We needed to tour to survive", recalled Brandenburg. "We had been banned from every club in Hollywood that could hold us—the Starwood, the Roxy, and the Whisky—and a lot of people wouldn't go to Pasadena (Perkins Palace) or East L.A. (The Vex) to see us". Smear, however, did not want to tour, and so left the band in June after only three months to allow them to find a guitar player who would tour. He was replaced by Royer's roommate, Steve Roberts, and in July the new lineup recorded a three-song EP, Welcome to Reality, produced by Thom Wilson.

Despite the success of the album, the planned release of the EP, and the forthcoming tour, the Adolescents broke up in August 1981. "Oddly enough, we'd never even made it out of California", Frank Agnew later reflected. Brandenburg later cited disagreements over the band's direction and his personal discomfort with their sudden popularity as reasons for the breakup:

There were big fights between me and most of the band for my refusal to take out the word "fuck" and change it to "suck". The parents of two members were upset by the profanity — this was our big chance to become junior pop stars; they wanted to tone it down for a wider audience. I looked at groups like Stiff Little Fingers and said "This is where that leads to". They wanted to sell out; I wasn't comfortable with being anybody's role model. I was an awkward, nerdy, goofy teen — within two years I was suddenly some spokesman for the angry teenager. I wasn't anyone's spokesperson; I could barely speak for myself! Everybody hated me, then they all loved me. I didn't have enough real friends around to differentiate between what friendship was and what was a passing infatuation. It just wasn't comfortable for me.

Welcome to Reality was released that October but was not well received. "It went over like a lead balloon and we threw in the towel", said Brandenburg. After the breakup, Brandenburg formed a new band, the Abandoned, who released one album, Killed by Faith (1985). Soto and Frank Agnew joined Los Angeles punk band Legal Weapon, playing on their 1982 album Death of Innocence; Agnew remained with them for Your Weapon, released later that year, then moved on to Hvy Drt, playing on their 1985 Hvy Drt EP. Royer, meanwhile, started D.I., taking on the role of singer. He was joined by Frederic Taccone, Tim Maag, Rikk Agnew, and former Social Distortion drummer Derek O'Brien for the D.I. EP (1983). Agnew then brought in his younger brother, Alfie Agnew, and the two remained in D.I. until 1987, playing on the albums Ancient Artifacts (1985) and Horse Bites Dog Cries (1986), and the Team Goon EP (1987).

=== Reunion, Brats in Battalions, and Balboa Fun*Zone: 1986–1989 ===
The Blue Album lineup of the Adolescents (Brandenburg, now using the stage name Tony Montana; Soto; Royer; and Rikk and Frank Agnew) played a reunion show in April 1986 at Fender's Ballroom in Long Beach, California which led to the band re-forming. They played more shows and began working on material for a new album, recording a demo of two new songs, "The Liar" and "Peasant Song". Frank Agnew left the band after a few months, however, and was replaced by his younger brother Alfie, then Royer left the group that August and was replaced by Sandy Hanson, formerly of the Mechanics. "Casey wanted to keep D.I. going, and I lost interest", said Frank. "I think that when Casey left, the band lost a major part of its sound", reflected Brandenburg in 1989. "Casey always played this kinda surf beat. On top of that, he was a major part of the vocal attack. When Casey left, the band...changed". The new lineup recorded the Brats in Battalions album that summer; it included new recordings of all three songs from Welcome to Reality, a new version of "Do the Eddie" (retitled "Do the Freddie"), and cover versions of "The House of the Rising Sun" and the Stooges' "I Got a Right". After touring through much of the second half of 1986, Alfie Agnew left the band at the end of the year to attend college and was replaced by Dan Colburn.

The lineup of Brandenburg, Soto, Colburn, Hanson, and Rikk Agnew toured for most of 1987, and Brats in Battalions was released that August on the group's own label, SOS Records. The band also contributed a cover version of the Kinks' "All Day and All of the Night" to the compilation Rat Music for Rat People Vol. III that year. By the end of 1987, however, Brandenburg and Colburn both left the band. Brandenburg stated in 1989, "I was interested in other things (I had joined another band, the Flower Leperds), and the Adolescents touring cut into my school work". He went on to record three studio albums with the Flower Leperds: Dirges in the Dark (1988), Heaven's Closed (1989), and Purple Reign (1990), sometimes using the stage name Tony Adolescent. Soto, Hanson, and Rikk Agnew decided to continue as the Adolescents with Soto and Agnew sharing lead vocal duties, and recruited guitarist Paul Casey, who left after a few months of touring. Frank Agnew rejoined the band and they recorded the album Balboa Fun*Zone (1988), released by Triple X Records. The band began working on a follow-up album with the same line-up as Balboa Fun*Zone, but eventually broke up in April 1989 before it could be completed. Triple X released the album Live 1981 & 1986 in 1989, combining recordings from two live performances. The Blue Album lineup reunited for a show in December 1989 at the Reseda Country Club, which was recorded and released eight years later as the live album Return to the Black Hole (Amsterdamned Records, 1997).

=== Post-Adolescents projects: 1990–2000 ===
Following the Adolescents' breakup, most of the members remained active in other projects. Soto formed the parody group Manic Hispanic in 1992 with Gabby Gaborno and other Chicano punk musicians, issuing their first album, The Menudo Incident, that year. He, Hanson, and Frank Agnew simultaneously started a band called Joyride, but Frank soon left to focus on his family life. He was replaced by guitarist Mike McKnight, who had played additional guitar on the Brats in Battalions track "The Liar", and Joyride continued until 1996, issuing two studio albums, Johnny Bravo (1992) and Another Month of Mondays (1994). Soto and Hanson subsequently formed 22 Jacks; Hanson left after the band's debut album, Uncle Bob (1996). 22 Jacks continued until 2001, issuing two more albums: Overserved (1998) and Going North (1999).

Royer remained active with D.I., who released What Good Is Grief to a God? in 1988 and Tragedy Again in 1989. Alfie Agnew rejoined D.I. from 1990 to 1992, joined by ex-Adolescent Dan Colburn on bass guitar; the two performed on the live album Live at a Dive (1993). Rikk Agnew, meanwhile, briefly rejoined Christian Death (performing on the live album Sleepless Nights: Live 1990) and released another solo album, Emotional Vomit (1990), under the name Rikk Agnew's Yard Sale; it featured contributions from his brothers Frank and Alfie. His third solo album, Turtle, was released in 1992. Following the Flower Leperds, Tony Brandenburg started a new group, Sister Goddamn, who issued two albums, Portrait in Crayon (1992) and Folksongs of the Spanish Inquisition (1995).

In 1992, the Adolescents' Blue Album members reunited in two projects. Brandenburg and Rikk and Frank Agnew joined other Southern California punk musicians including Bruce Duff (of 45 Grave, Twisted Roots, Sister Goddamn, and several Jeff Dahl projects), Jonny Wickersham, and Warner Young for Pinups, an album of cover versions of punk rock songs from the 1970s and early 1980s on which Soto sang backing vocals alongside Dave Naz (of the Chemical People, Down by Law, and the Last) and Rik L. Rik (of F-Word! and the Slaves). Brandenburg (now using the stage name Tony Reflex), Royer, and Rikk Agnew also formed ADZ; the group's name was a shortened form of Adolescents. Royer and Agnew both left ADZ after the band's first album, Where Were You? (1992); both had substance abuse issues. Royer was addicted to heroin, while Agnew abused a variety of drugs and drank alcohol excessively throughout the 1990s and early 2000s, becoming obese in the process. Royer resumed recording with D.I., issuing State of Shock in 1994, and continued to perform with various lineups throughout the decade. Rikk Agnew briefly rejoined Christian Death, playing on the live album Iconologia (1993). Brandenburg continued ADZ with other members, issuing two more albums during the 1990s: 1995's Piper at the Gates of Downey (with Frank Agnew playing lead guitar on five tracks) and 1998's Transmissions from Planet Speedball.

=== Reunion and OC Confidential: 2001–2005 ===
The Blue Album lineup of Reflex, Soto, Royer, and Rikk and Frank Agnew reunited again in 2001 to play a birthday party for Reflex's wife. Over the next few years the band played sporadically, including opening for Bad Religion at a benefit for Flipside and a headlining slot at Los Angeles' Galaxy Theater. During this time the band members remained active in their other projects: Royer released D.I.'s Caseyology in 2002, Reflex did one more studio album with ADZ, 2002's American Steel, while Soto did two more with Manic Hispanic, The Recline of Mexican Civilization (2001) and Mijo Goes to Jr. College (2003). Royer left the Adolescents again, going on to release On the Western Front with D.I. in 2007. He was replaced by drummer Derek O'Brien, formerly of Social Distortion, D.I., Agent Orange, and Extra Fancy. Encouraged by the response to their reunion shows, Reflex suggested that the band start writing new material. The Adolescents issued an EP titled Unwrap and Blow Me! in 2003, limited to 100 copies and consisting of six new songs: "Hawks and Doves", "Where the Children Play", "California Son", "OC Confidential", "Pointless Teenage Anthem", and "Within These Walls". They performed a show on October 3, 2003 at the House of Blues at Downtown Disney, which was filmed and recorded for Kung Fu Records' live series The Show Must Go Off!. The resulting live album and DVD, titled Live at the House of Blues, was released February 24, 2004 and featured songs from Adolescents and Welcome to Reality along with the new songs "OC Confidential", "California Son", "Lockdown America", "Hawks and Doves", and "Within These Walls".

Rikk Agnew, however, continued to drink excessively and was not invested in the reunion. He left the band by the end of 2003, halfway through the recording process for a new album. "None of it made me happy anymore," he reflected 11 years later, "I loathed it". He continued to struggle with alcoholism, drug abuse, depression, and morbid obesity over the next several years, despite being taken to drug rehabilitation by some of his former Detours bandmates in 2006. This resulted in a number of serious health problems, and by early 2010 his doctors predicted he would not live beyond three more months. He gave up hard drugs and alcohol, began dieting and exercising, and lost a significant amount of weight. By 2014 he was engaged to former Christian Death member Gitane DeMone, had started his own group, the Rikk Agnew Band, and had reunited with his first band, the Detours, which now included his brother Alfie.

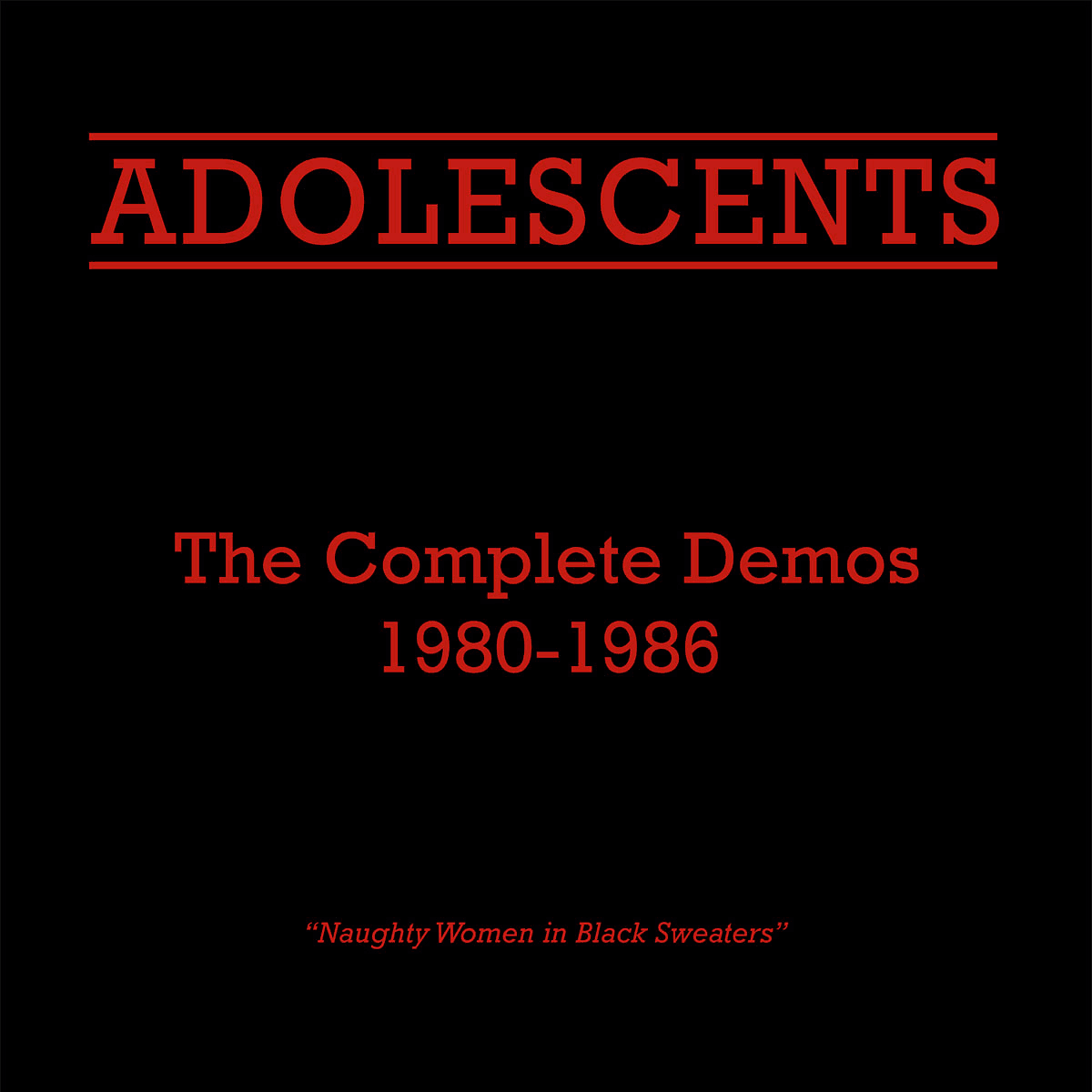
The Complete Demos 1980–1986 (2005) collected all the demo recordings from the Adolescents' early years.

Rikk's departure stalled the Adolescents' recording plans. Soto recorded another album with Manic Hispanic, 2005's Grupo Sexo. The Adolescents decided to continue as a quartet, re-recording the new songs they had done with Rikk and recording several more for their comeback album, OC Confidential (2005), which ultimately took over two years to complete. Prior to its release, they issued The Complete Demos 1980–1986, a compilation of all of the early lineups' demo recordings, released by Frontier Records in March 2005. OC Confidential followed that July through Finger Records. For touring in support of the album, the band was joined by Frank Agnew's son, Frank Agnew, Jr., on second guitar. Reflex wrapped up ADZ by recording a live album that September, released the following year as Live Plus Five.

=== Reflex and Soto-led lineups, Soto's death, Russian Spider Dump and Caesar Salad Days: 2006–present ===
The Adolescents toured in support of OC Confidential, but Frank Agnew left the band in 2006. Rotating through as the band's live guitarists over the next few years were Matt Beld, Joe Harrison, and Soto's former Joyride bandmate Mike McKnight. O'Brien left the band in 2008 and was replaced by Armando Del Rio. Reflex and Soto became the band's sole constant members and primary songwriters from this point forward, and signed the Adolescents to German label Concrete Jungle Records. A split EP with the band Burning Heads was released in 2009. For the band's next album, 2011's The Fastest Kid Alive, the lineup was Reflex, Soto, Del Rio, McKnight, and Harrison. The band also contributed a cover version of the Runaways' "School Days" to the tribute album Take It or Leave It: A Tribute to the Queens of Noise that year.

Dan Root took Harrison's guitar position in 2010, and the Adolescents released the American Dogs in Europe EP in conjunction with a European tour. This was followed by the band's sixth studio album, Presumed Insolent (2013). Del Rio was replaced by Mike Cambra, and McKnight by Leroy Merlin, for 2014's La Vendetta..., which was given a North American release the following year by Frontier Records. Hot War, a split EP with Russian band Svetlanas, followed in 2015, containing one song from Presumed Insolent and one from La Vendetta... The Adolescents' released Manifest Density, was released July 8, 2016 by Concrete Jungle, with Ian Taylor taking Merlin's place as rhythm guitarist.

On June 27, 2018, bassist and founding member Steve Soto died at the age of 54, days after completing an East coast tour with the band. Cause of death is unknown. Tony Reflex released a statement saying "With heavy heart I share the passing of Steve Soto, my friend and bandmate since 1979. I don't know what to do. Or to say. Goodbye my brother." The band released Cropduster, their ninth album and final album with Soto, on July 20, 2018. On July 14, 2023, the band released their eleventh studio album, Caesar Salad Days.

== Band members ==
Current

- Tony Reflex – lead vocals (1980–1981, 1986–1988, 2001–present)
- Dan Root – lead guitar (2010–present)
- Mike Cambra – drums (2013–present)
- Ian Taylor – rhythm guitar (2014–present)
- Brad Logan – bass (2018–present)

Touring

- Matt Beld – rhythm guitar (2006–2007)
- Warren Renfrow – bass (2007–2008)
- Gilbert Picardo – rhythm guitar (2013–2014)

Former

- Steve Soto – bass, vocals (1980–1981, 1986–1989, 2001–2018, died 2018)
- Frank Agnew – lead guitar (1980–1981, 1986, 1988–1989, 2001–2006)
- John O'Donovan – rhythm guitar (1980)
- Peter Pan (Greg Williams) – drums (1980)
- Rikk Agnew – rhythm guitar, vocals (1980–1981, 1986–1989, 2001–2003)
- Casey Royer – drums, backing vocals (1980–1981, 1986, 2001)
- Pat Smear – rhythm guitar (1981)
- Steve Roberts – rhythm guitar (1981)
- Alfie Agnew – lead guitar, backing vocals (1986)
- Sandy Hansen – drums (1986–1989)
- Dan Colburn – lead guitar (1986–1987)
- Paul Casey – lead guitar (1988; died 2015)
- Derek O'Brien – drums (2001–2008)
- Frank Agnew, Jr. – rhythm guitar (2005)
- Joe Harrison – lead guitar (2006–2012, 2014)
- Mike McKnight – rhythm guitar (2008–2013)
- Armando del Río – drums (2008–2013)
- Leroy Merlin – rhythm guitar, backing vocals (2014)

== Discography ==
Studio albums

- Adolescents (1981)
- Brats in Battalions (1987)
- Balboa Fun*Zone (1988)
- OC Confidential (2005)
- The Fastest Kid Alive (2011)
- Presumed Insolent (2013)
- La Vendetta... (2014)
- Manifest Density (2016)
- Cropduster (2018)
- Russian Spider Dump (2020)
- Caesar Salad Days (2023)
