= Manic Hispanic =

American Chicano punk rock band

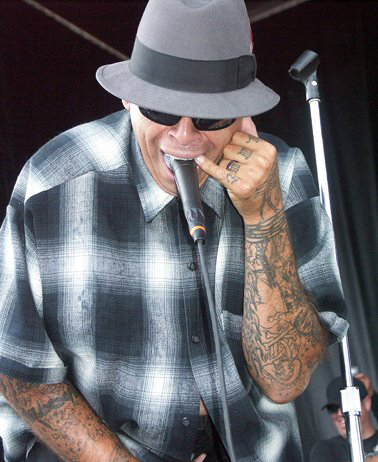
- Manic Hispanic at the Warped Tour

Background information
- Origin: Orange County, California
- Genre: Punk rock
- Years active: 1992–present
- Labels: Doctor Dream records (1995), BYO Records (2001-2005), Smelvis Records (2021-Present)
- Members: Warren "Oso" Renfrow, Ruben "Chino" Rivera, Maurice "Mo Grease" Torres, Efrem "Chuey Luis" Martinez Schulz, Elvis Cortez, Gilbert "Dreamer" Pichardo, Louie "Juan Solo" Perez El Tercero III
- Past members: Sonny "Tio" Lujan, Steve "Mad Ralphie" Acevedo, Ray "Bones" Rodriguez, "Huesos", Steve "Hoakie" Soto (deceased, 2018), Mike "Gabby" Gaborno (deceased, 2017)
- Website: Official Site

Manic Hispanic is an American Chicano punk rock band from Orange County and Los Angeles, California, United States. They are a comedy act that plays cover versions of punk rock "standards" by slightly renaming songs and adjusting lyrics with humorous references to Chicano culture. The band's members are all Mexican American and use stage names and dress in cholo attire further marking the Mexican/Chicano image of the band. Manic Hispanic is a supergroup made up of former and/or current members of The Adolescents, The Grabbers, Punk Rock Karaoke, The X-Members, 22 Jacks, Final Conflict, Agent Orange, Death by Stereo and The Cadillac Tramps. The band's music is self described as a reinterpretation of classic punk rock songs with a touch of Cheech and Chong meets Weird Al Yankovic.

== History ==
=== Band formation (1992-1995) ===
Manic Hispanic was originally started in 1992 by Mike "Gabby" Gaborno (a.k.a. Jefe) from The Cadillac Tramps and Steve Soto (a.k.a. El Hoakie Loco) from The Adolescents/22 Jacks, originally with the intent to perform doo-wop versions of punk songs. Steve Soto describes the origin of Manic Hispanic starting out as a joke between himself and Gabby when they worked together at the Doctor Dream Warehouse. The premise was a punk band covering Freddy Fender songs. Members later recruited are: Chino and Mo Grease (members of The Grabbers), Warren "Oso" Renfrow (from The Cadillac Tramps/Final Conflict), and Mad Ralphie (a.k.a. Steve "Ace" Acevedo a Sound Engineer and tour manager).

The band itself created their origin story, saying that in the early 1990's, an Orange County probation Officer named Freddie Gomez organized a work release program and encouraged some street thugs to form the band as an escape from "a life of lockdowns and orange jumpsuits". The band leaned into this origin story by wearing clothing popular with Southern Californian Cholo and gangster attire such as pendelton shirts and khaki pants.

When they got together to rehearse, they dropped the doo-wop idea and ended up playing classic Sex Pistols and Clash songs but swapped the lyrics for spanglish lyrics about barrio culture in an effort to make each other laugh.

They didn't initially plan anything beyond a couple of shows. Their first show was at the Doll Hut, followed by a second at the Cal State Fullerton pub. During their third show, Club Mesa, they asked Sonny "Tio" Lucas to come to the stage and sing the Sex Pistols "God Save the Queen" completely in spanish, which he did, and joined the band shortly thereafter.

=== Recordings (1995-2017) ===
Their first album was released in 1995 on Doctor Dream records. Entitled The Menudo Incident, a reference to Guns N' Roses' The Spaghetti Incident, it featured cover versions of songs by The Buzzcocks, The Damned, X, Black Flag, Wire, The Clash, and others. These cover versions featured rewritten lyrics humorously reflecting the Chicano identity of the band and Chicano/Mexican culture as a whole. Tracks commonly include lyrics sung in Spanish, English, and Chicano "slang" a.k.a. Caló. Examples include songs such as The Damned's "New Rose" retitled "New Rosa", and Eddie and the Subtitles' "American Society" retitled "Mexican Society." The Menudo Incident also contains a version of Tejano/country musician Freddy Fender's "Before the Next Teardrop Falls", a bilingual hit when released by Fender in the 1970s. The cover art mimicked the Guns N' Roses release, showing a bowl of menudo, the traditional Mexican tripe specialty.

The band returned with a second album in 2001, The Recline of Mexican Civilization (spoofing the 80's punk documentary film The Decline of Western Civilization) for BYO Records. The band's out-of-print debut album, The Menudo Incident, was reissued by BYO in 2003.

BYO also released Mijo Goes to Jr. College (aping The Descendents' Milo Goes To College) in 2003, and Grupo Sexo (spoofing the Circle Jerks' Group Sex) in 2005. Mad Ralphie is not credited for vocals for either Mijo Goes to Jr. College or Grupo Sexo, however the band credits a new bandmember "Huesos" on vocals for these albums.

The Band continued to play shows and festivals periodically throughout the late 90's and early 2000's at their convenience in between other band commitments. Despite missing members during shows due to other band commitments, Gabby remained the sole member to always play with the band in his part Lead Singer.

Ray "Bones" Rodriguez, hall of fame skateboarder and former X-Members bandmate, filled in as vocalist for live shows from 2005-2008, but departed in 2008 and was replaced with Efrem Schulz.

=== Band reformation (2017-present) ===
In early January 2017, founding member, Mike "Gabby" Gaborno, passed away at the age of 51 from liver cancer. After Gabby's Passing, the remaining members stated they were unsure of the band's future. After a period of grieving, Steve and the remaining members decided to reform the band, and added both Louie Perez III and Gilbert Pichardo as vocalists. Gilbert Pichardo had been a roadie for Manic Hispanic since 2009 and previously toured with Shulz. Louie Perez III, a Southern California tattoo artist, had been approached by Gabby and Steve earlier in the bands history to fill in as a guitarist but was unable to commit to being a member at the time. When approached again by Steve Soto after Gabby's passing, Louie was initially hesitant, stating he did not want to replace Gabby. Louie sent Steve Soto song ideas including the lyrics for the song "Chancla Abuser" a parody of "Sonic Reducer" by the Dead Boys. After rehearsing with the band, Louie confirmed his interest in joining and suggested recording an album, but to his surprise Steve had already begun recording the new tracks for an upcoming record.

In 2018, the second founding member, Steve Soto, passed away of natural causes. The remaining band members entered into another period of grief and uncertainty, though eventually decided to release albums worth of already recorded material, including some of Steve Soto's last guitar tracks remained unreleased. Louie stated "Steve wanted the idea and legacy of Manic Hispanic to go on", "As he (Steve) stated in is famous analogy, 'if the grandma dies before Christmas, the tia has to step up and make the tamales'". Left Alone frontman Elvis Cortez joined as a guitarist shortly after Steve's passing. Louie stated Steve Soto always wanted Elvis to join the band. Together the remaining original members and new additions worked on finalizing their new record.

Back in Brown, was released on September 19, 2021. In 2023, the band released A Message to you Chunti 7" EP, with "Paisa", a parody cover of Rancid (band)'s "Time Bomb", and the EP's title song, a cover of "A Message to you Rudy" by the Specials. In late 2025, Louie Perez III stepped away from touring with the band to deal with some medical issues but was expected to make a return to touring. In May 2026, the band released a full length "Self-Titled" album.

== Chicano identity ==
While most of the band's material is delivered with a sense of humor, political undertones do occasionally appear in their music, such as "Poem" from The Menudo Incident, tells a first-hand account of fearing a potential drive-by shooting, told over a doo-wop backing. In addition, their cover of Iggy & The Stooges' "I Got A Right" includes the lyric, "I got a right, got a right to speak/any language I want, yeah." The band also traditionally plays live in California on Cinco de Mayo.

== Lineup ==
Current

- Ruben "Chino" Rivera – Drums (1992-present)
- Maurice "Mo Grease" Torres – Guitar (1992-present)
- Elvis Cortez - Guitar (2018-present)
- Warren "Oso" Renfrow – Bass (1992-present)
- Efrem "Chuey Luis" Martinez Schulz – Vocals (2008-present)
- Gilbert "Dreamer" Pichardo - Vocals (2018-present)
- Louie "Juan Solo" Perez El Tercero III – Vocals (2018-present)

Former

- Mike "Gabby"/"Jefe" Gaborno - Vocals (1992-2017)
- Steve " El Hoakie Loco" Soto – Guitar/Vocals (1992-2018)
- Steve "Mad Ralphie" Acevedo – Vocals (1992-2003)
- Sonny "Tio" Lucas – Vocals (1992-2017)
- Ray Bones Rodriguez "Huesos" Vocals (2005-2008)
- "Huesos" - Vocals (2003-2005)

== Discography ==
- The Menudo Incident (1995, Doctor Dream Records; Reissued in 2003, BYO Records Reissued Limited Edition Vinyl in 2018 Indecision Records)
- The Recline of Mexican Civilization (2001, BYO Records)
- Mijo Goes to Jr. College (2003, BYO Records)
- Grupo Sexo (2005, BYO Records)
- Back In Brown (2021, Smelvis Records)
- A Message to you Chunti, EP (2023, Smelvis Records)
- Manic Hispanic (2026, Smelvis Records)
- Santa Got Run Over By My Chevy, Single, (Unknown, Unknown)
