= Burning Heads =

French band

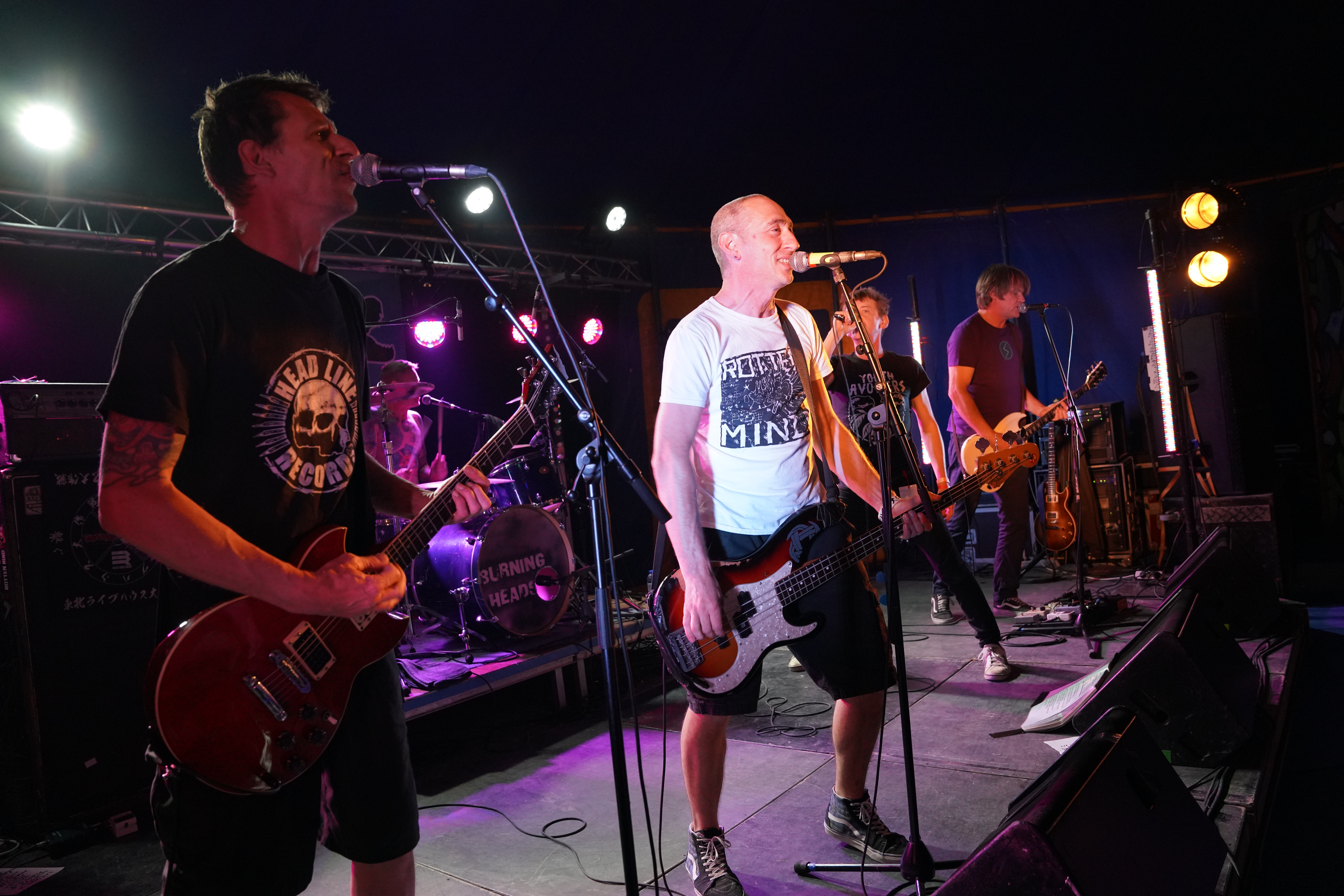

Background information
- Origin: Orléans, France
- Genres: Punk rock, Reggae
- Years active: 1987-present
- Labels: Play It Again Sam, Epitaph Records, Victory Records, Sony Records, Opposite Records
- Website: http://burningheads.propagande.org/

Burning Heads is a punk rock and reggae band from Orléans, France. The group formed in 1987, and started out releasing records independently before signing with Play It Again Sam in 1994. They became more popular in America with the release of their 1998 record, Be One with the Flames, on Epitaph Records, and 1999's Escape, on Victory Records. Later releases came out on Yelen Musiques, a label of Columbia Records which is a trademark of Sony Music Entertainment, and Opposite Records.

== Members ==
- Mikiss - guitar, back vocals (since 2005)
- DJ TDK (Thomas) - drums, back vocals (since 1987)
- JYB - bass, back vocals (since 1993)
- Phil - lead guitar, back vocals (1987-2001, since 2019)
- Fra - lead vocals (since 2019)

== Discography ==
- Burning Heads EP (1991)
- Burning Heads (1993)
- Dive (PIAS, 1994)
- Super Modern World (PIAS, 1996)
- The Weightless Hits (PIAS, 1997)
- Be One with the Flames (Epitaph Records, 1998)
- Wise Guy EP (Pinnacle Records, 1998)
- Escape (Victory Records, 1999)
- Opposite (Sony Records, 2002)
- Taranto (Sony Records, 2003)
- BHASS/Never Trust a Punk (Sony Records, 2004, with Alif Sound System )
- Bad Time for Human Kind (Opposite, 2006)
- Incredible Rock Machine (Opposite, 2006)
- Opposite 2 (Opposite, 2007)
- Split 12" with The Adolescents (Opposite / Slow Death / Wee Wee, 2009)
- Spread The Fire (Opposite, 2009)
- Hear This (Opposite Prod, 2011)
- Choose your trap (Opposite, KTC, Euthanase, 2014)
- Under Their Influence (Kicking Records, 2020)
- Fear EP (Kicking Records, 2021)
- Torches Of Freedom (Kicking Records, 2022)
