= Dan Colburn =

American musician

Dan Colburn is an American musician best known as a guitarist for the Southern California punk band The Adolescents from 1987 to 1989. He also played bass for D.I. from 1990–1992, appearing on their Live at a Dive CD. Colburn has been a member of many other Orange County bands since 1982 as well, including Primal Dance, White Rabbit, Jonestown, and Partners in Crime. Colburn joined Mind Over Four in 1988 but left in 1989 to rejoin The Adolescents during their "Balboa Fun Zone" era. He then joined D.I. for their first European tour and live album, followed by a second 1990 tour with a solo Rikk Agnew. Afterwards, Colburn worked a short stint with T.S.O.L. splinter group Tender Fury.

In 1997, Colburn dropped out of performing music to pursue career goals.

In 2000, at age 33, and following a 15-year hiatus, Colburn renewed his interest in skateboarding, competing in several "Legends" pool and bowl competitions. He has been involved in the website socalskateparks.com, run by longtime friend Mike Hirsch.

In 2007, Colburn again returned to performing, playing with the re-united Detours along with Detours founder Rikk Agnew.
