= Derek O'Brien (drummer) =

American drummer

- Born: Derek Shawn O'Brien; Fullerton, California, U.S.
- Occupations: Drummer, Producer

Derek Shawn O'Brien is an American punk rock drummer and producer. He is currently the drummer for the band Ultra Bomb.

== Early life ==
O'Brien started playing at Fullerton High School playing with the school Jazz Band, Marching Band and Orchestras and played in cover bands by night with guitarists Stan De Witt and Frank Agnew.

He joined local punk rock band Social Distortion (1981–84). His recordings with the band include the first EP "1945", Single ("Playpen"), BYO Compilation song "(Mass Hysteria)", and first full-length album Mommy's Little Monster. He featured in the documentary Another State Of Mind.

== Career ==
O'Brien was involved in D.I. (which featured many former members of Social Distortion and the Adolescents). He played on their 1983 EP D.I., which was later re-released as Team Goon on Triple X Records. Derek performed as the drummer for D.I. in the film Suburbia, and is part of D.I.'s 1983 self-promotional video Suburbia Sessions.

He also played with Social Distortion from 1981-1983 and played on the LP, 'Mommy's Little Monster' as well as the '1945' single both on the 13th Floor Records label. He also drummed on the song 'Mass Hysteria' which was included on the 1982 compilation, 'Someone's Gonna Get Their Head Kicked In' released on BYO records.

In 1984 O'Brien joined the final incarnation of the Long Beach-based art-rock band Outer Circle. Subsequent to Outer Circle's dissolution, O'Brien and fellow Outer Circle alumni Cole Coonce and Steve "Spit" Spingola formed the Fontanelles with ex-Saccharine Trust bassist Mark Hodson.

Bassist Brent Liles and O'Brien reunited from 1989 until 1992 with Agent Orange Touring North America and recording Real Live Sound - Agent Orange Live at the Roxy.

In 1992 Brian Grillo (ex-singer of Lockup) enlisted O'Brien to play with Extra Fancy, including guitarist Michael Hately and bassist David Foster. In 1995, Extra Fancy produced Sinnerman and an independent EP No Mercy which has songs featured in movie soundtracks. Extra Fancy continued until 1997.

1996 - 2015, O'Brien and other founding members Greg Hetson (Bad Religion, Circle Jerks) and Eric Melvin (NOFX) formed Punk Rock Karaoke. Their first show featured Mark and Bob Mothersbaugh (Devo) and others. O'Brien toured and played local shows as their full time drummer until 2015. Many members and "special guests" performed with the group over the years including: Mike Watt (Iggy Pop), Mike Ness, Jonny 2 Bags (Social Distortion), Matt Skiba (Alkaline Trio, Blink 182), Noodles (The Offspring), Randy Bradbury (Pennywise), Fat Mike (NOFX), several Ramones, members of Descendents, and Dave King (Flogging Molly)!

1998, 1999 saw O'Brien working with a female fronted synth rock / pop band called Ripe featuring Pete Thorn on guitar, also on guitar was Andrew Browning (who Derek later played drums for and produced 3 albums for Browning and the Nine Pound Hammers). Another female fronted band during this time was Drag Beat featuring Rick Ballard and PJ Wolfe (founders of Acetate Records).

O'Brien studied at UCLA, earning a degree in Audio Engineering and in 2001 founded D.O'B. Sound Recording Studios in Glendale, California. In 2009 he relocated the studio to Santa Fe Springs, California and now offers recording, mixing, mastering, rehearsals, a course in audio engineering and private drum lessons. O'Brien still performs on short international tours, local gigs, and recordings.

== See also ==
- Agent Orange (band)
- Miss Derringer
