= 22 Jacks =

American punk rock band

- Origin: California, United States
- Genres: Punk rock; pop punk
- Years active: 1995–2001; 2007–present
- Labels: SideOneDummy; BYO
- Members: Joe Sib; James Achor; Bill Fraenza; Jose Medeles
- Past members: Steve Soto; Sandy Hansen; Dave Nassie; Matt Riddle; Kelly LeMieux; C.J. Ramone; Chris Shiflett; Jason Cropper

22 Jacks is an American punk rock supergroup, consisting of members of Wax, The Breeders, The Adolescents and Royal Crown Revue. They were active from 1995 to 2001, and again from 2007 on.

== Career ==
In late 1995, Joe Sib, after the breakup of his band Wax, decided to get together with longtime friend Steve Soto (former member of The Adolescents and Agent Orange) to write some material. They soon gathered Sandy Hansen (The Adolescents), Scott Shiflett (Face to Face), and Jason Cropper (Weezer) to form 22 Jacks. In February 1996, 22 Jacks went to The Sandbox studio in Los Angeles and recorded 12 songs, which became the "Uncle Bob" record. With the three final additions to the band already having prior commitments, Sib and Soto went on a search for replacements to solidify the lineup. They found Kelly LeMieux (Fear), Jose Medeles (The Breeders, and Face to Face), and Bill Fraenza.

Before a fourth album could be recorded, 22 Jacks ended around 2001 as Sib left the band to concentrate on the future of SideOneDummy Records. Following the breakup, Soto went on to reform The Adolescents, and Medeles also joined the reunion of The Breeders as their new drummer.

During its six-year lifespan 22 Jacks toured with numerous bands, including Reel Big Fish, Lit, The Bloodhound Gang, Mighty Mighty Bosstones, Goldfinger, Social Distortion, Bouncing Souls, Unwritten Law, Face to Face, Voodoo Glow Skulls, and Ten Foot Pole. They also sang back up for Joey Ramone on a song for a Cheap Trick Tribute album.

== Reunion and Soto's death ==
On December 13, 2007, Punkbands.com reported that 22 Jacks had reformed to play three shows in California in January 2008, making it their first performance together since breaking up in 2001. On one of the dates, they were supported by Social Distortion. It was also announced that there may be a follow-up to that tour. As of this moment, the band has not yet expressed plans for a new studio album.

On June 27, 2018, founding member Steve Soto died suddenly in his sleep at the age of 54 just days after finishing a tour with his band The Adolescents.

== Members ==
- Joe Sib - Vocals (1995–2001; 2007 – present)
- Bill Fraenza - Guitars (1995–2001; 2007 – present)
- James Achor - Bass (2007 – present)
- Jose Medeles - Drums (1995–2001; 2007 – present)

=== Former members ===
- Steve Soto - Vocals, Guitars (1995–2001; 2007–2018, died 2018)
- Dave Nassie - Bass
- Matt Riddle - Bass
- Kelly LeMieux - Bass
- C.J. Ramone - Bass
- Scott Shiflett - Bass
- Jason Cropper - Guitar
- Sandy Hansen - Drums
- Chris Shiflett - Guitar

== Discography ==
=== Albums ===
- Uncle Bob (1996)
- Overserved (1998)
- Going North (1999)

=== Splits ===
- 22 Jacks ("Breakin'") & Clowns for Progress ("Insect") (7" Vinyl)
- 22 Jacks ("Fall") & The Smooths ("Sin Supposed To Be") (7" Vinyl)
- 22 Jacks ("Passport") & Mess ("You're a Drag & Five-O") (7" Vinyl)
- 22 Jacks ("Sky") & Wank ("Larry Brown") (7" Vinyl)

=== Singles ===
- "Swallow" (7" Vinyl)

=== Box sets ===
- Twenty-Two Jacks (1998)
