= Frank Agnew =

American guitarist & songwriter (born 1964)

- Born: Francis Thomas Agnew; August 18, 1964 (age 61)
- Genres: Punk rock; hardcore punk; skate punk; death rock; alternative rock
- Occupations: Musician; songwriter; record producer
- Instruments: Guitar; vocals; keyboards; bass guitar; drums; percussion
- Years active: 1980–present
- Labels: Frontier
- Formerly of: Adolescents; 45 Grave

Francis Thomas "Frank" Agnew (born August 18, 1964) is an American guitarist and songwriter, best known for being a member of punk rock band the Adolescents. Frank's brothers Rikk Agnew and Alfie Agnew, as well as his son Frank Agnew Jr., are also former Adolescents guitarists.

== Early life ==
Frank Agnew was born into a musical family, half Irish and half Mexican-American. In 1972, his parents moved from La Puente to Fullerton, California. He began playing guitar professionally at an early age, and his brother Rikk sometimes had to sneak him in through the back door of 18 plus or 21 plus venues.

Agnew dropped out of high school, but later pursued a liberal arts degree at Fullerton College. After finishing his studies, he went to work in the computer industry.

== Music career ==
Over the years, Agnew has played with a number of bands, including 45 Grave, the Tribe, Adolescents, Der Stab, HVY DRT, Legal Weapon, PinUps, Casey Royer's Social Distortion splinter group, and T.S.O.L.

Agnew joined The Adolescents in 1980 after playing in Casey Royer's Social Distortion splinter group. When the Adolescents broke up in the summer of 1981, Agnew joined Legal Weapon with fellow Adolescent Steve Soto, and then played as a touring guitarist with T.S.O.L. to promote their Dance With Me album. Agnew reunited with the "Blue Album" line-up of the Adolescents in 1986, but left along with drummer Casey Royer before the recording of the 1987 Brats in Battalions album. Agnew returned to play guitar for two tracks on the Adolescents' 1988 Balboa Fun*Zone album, but he did not permanently rejoin the band. Agnew took part in another Adolescents reunion in 2004 and was the sole guitarist on the resulting O.C. Confidential album.

In 2010, Agnew joined 45 Grave, proceeding to take part in the recording of the band's 2012 Pick Your Poison album, released on Frontier Records. In 2013, Frank Agnew met The Voice's Bree Fondacaro, then performing under the stage name Bree Harlow Bree and Frank collaborated on her 2013 cover of 'Paint it Black' released through Arcadian Records. This began a successful collaboration with Bree Fondacaro in a band called the Fatalists.

Agnew is credited as songwriter on a number of film soundtracks and also occasionally appears as an actor.

== Personal life ==
Agnew has two older siblings, Rikk and Toni (sister), and a younger brother, Alfie. He also has a half-brother, Jim, and a half-sister, Beverly, who are both older than Rikk. He has a son, Frank Agnew Jr.
