= Triple X Records =

US record label

Triple X Records was a Los Angeles-based record company started by three former employees of the bankrupt Greenworld Distribution: Dean Naleway, Peter Heur and Charley Brown.

The label was known for "a fearlessly eclectic catalogue that broke away from not just the mainstream, but the equally rigid guidelines of punk rock as well," according to Phoenix New Times writer Anita Jackson. The label's roster included such artists as Jane's Addiction, Acrophet, The Selecter, The Dickies, Psi Com, The Miracle Workers, L.A.P.D., Bo Diddley, D.I., the Adolescents, T.S.O.L., the Vandals, Mind Over Four, Nocturne, Social Distortion, Human Drama, Of Cabbages and Kings, Angry Samoans, Bad Manners, Mojo Nixon, Fish Karma, Benign Rebellion, Stephen Pearcy, Dr. Dre, Doggy Style, Spice 1, South Central Cartel, Slow Pain, Nino Brown, Gaza Strippers, Brownside and Mr. Shadow.

In 1987, Triple X released the debut album by Jane's Addiction. The live recording was titled Jane's Addiction and included the acoustic song "Jane Says". The release resulted in a bidding war among major labels that led to the band signing with Warner Bros.

In 1991 the label released the first V/A tribute to the Ramones (many similar compilations have been released since)- Gabba Gabba Hey: A Tribute to the Ramones. This initial compilation featured, among others, Bad Religion, Keith Morris, L7, D.I., Mojo Nixon, The Flesh Eaters, White Flag, and the Groovie Ghoulies.

In 1996, Dr. Dre and Interscope Records sued Triple X Records to remove an album of early Dre material titled First Round Knock Out from the marketplace.
