= Casey Royer =

American singer and drummer (born 1958)

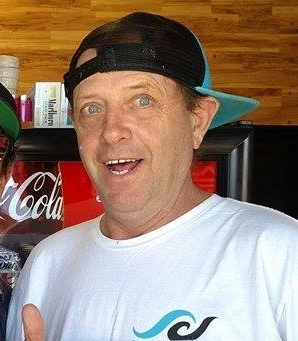

Background information
- Born: Casey A. Royer; October 8, 1958 (age 67)
- Genres: Skate punk; punk rock; hardcore punk
- Occupations: Singer; musician; songwriter
- Instruments: Vocals; drums
- Years active: 1977–present
- Labels: Frontier; Reject; Triple X; Cleopatra; Doctor Dream; Suburban Noize
- Member of: D.I.
- Formerly of: Social Distortion; Adolescents

Casey A. Royer (born October 8, 1958), is an American musician and an early pioneer of the hardcore punk rock genre in Orange County. In a career spanning more than 40 years, Royer is best known as the lead vocalist for Southern Californian punk rock band D.I. and as a drummer for the Adolescents.

As a teenager, he formed Social Distortion with Mike Ness, within which he was the drummer. After splitting up with Ness in 1979, Royer became the lead vocalist for a short-lived Social Distortion splinter group, before subsequently drumming with The Detours and later the Adolescents beginning in 1980. He formed D.I. after the Adolescents first break up in 1981, which has since become his primary band.

== Early life ==
Royer was born on October 8, 1958, at St. Joseph's Hospital in Orange, California. Royer was adopted as a baby by Jack Royer and Virgina Royer. Jack was a public servant, serving the City of Fullerton's Water & Utility District. Royer's father taught him electrical and plumbing skills from a young age, but it was Royer's uncle who introduced him to music and drumming at the age of 9. Royer was raised as a single child, but later reconnected with his biological sister whom he met later in life. Growing up, Royer's family had a second home by the beach in El Morro, California, where he learned how to surf. Southern California's surf scene and Royer's suburban upbringing would later influence much of the punk rocker's lyrical and fast-paced musical style.

Royer's biological father, Eddie Adamek, was a prize-winning cowboy who helped create Disneyland's Frontierland, and taught rope trick skills to actor Steve Martin, who performed his own rope tricks in movie and fiesta sequences. Although Royer never met Adamek, Royer attributes his athleticism and passion for performing to his biological father.

Royer attended Troy High School, and began playing music with friends in the neighborhoods of Fullerton and Placentia, California. A shifting group of friends formed bands and played at parties and other gigs during their high school years.

== Career ==
As a teenager, Royer began his music career as a formative member of Social Distortion with Mike Ness and the band's original drummer. In high school, Mike Ness spent time at Royer's family home in Fullerton, where Royer created the name "Social Distortion" for the band, and began to recruit members to play. In addition to forming and naming the band, Royer wrote "Mommy's Little Monster" and composed the group's early lyrics with occasional help from original lead vocalist Tom Corvin. He later drummed with the Detours, and after parting ways with Ness, Royer became the lead vocalist of a Social Distortion splinter group before disbanding it to drum for the Adolescents on and off between 1980 and 1987.

Royer wrote the song "Amoeba" with Rikk Agnew. Royer said he got the inspiration for Amoeba during his high school science class. The song has been featured in films and video games, such as Tony Hawk's Pro Skater 3 (2001), Grand Theft Auto V (2013) and Call of Duty: Black Ops Cold War (2020), SLC Punk, The Carrie Diaries, and more. In 2009, Mark Hoppus and Travis Barker of Blink-182 covered "Amoeba" for the soundtrack to the film Endless Bummer. After the Adolescents' first break-up in 1981, Casey formed D.I., where he is the lead vocalist, primary songwriter and only consistent member. He wrote "Richard Hung Himself", which has been covered by other artists, including Slayer.

In 1983, the cult film Suburbia was released, which features live footage of Royer and D.I. performing "Richard Hung Himself". Director Penelope Spheeris recruited street youths and punk-rock musicians to represent each role rather than hiring actors. To pay homage to the punk rock film, which put D.I. at the helm of the American Hardcore music scene, Royer got a T.R. (The Rejected) tattoo on his arm.

When the Adolescents reformed in 1986, Casey returned to the band but left before the 1987 reunion album Brats in Battalions was recorded. He rejoined them again in 2001–02 for their 20th Anniversary Tour. Casey also joined former Adolescents band members in the band ADZ from 1989–93, after which he again made D.I. his primary focus. He has been the only constant member through many D.I. line-up shifts since the band's inception. Due to creative differences, Adolescents founders Tony, Frank and Steve kicked out Blue Album line-up members Casey Royer and Rikk Agnew. Casey wrote a popular song on the Blue album titled "Amoeba", now considered a punk rock anthem. Steve, Tony, Frank, and Rikk shared songwriting credits for the rest of the Blue Album, creating the iconic Orange County sound recognized worldwide. In 2017, Casey and Rikk formed a Blue Album tribute band called the RADolescents with other former alumni of the Adolescents, including Rikk's young nephew Frank Jr. on vocals.

Royer was recognized by the County of Orange for pioneering the early punk rock scene in Orange County. With the onset of social media, his bands are seeing a popular resurgence across the globe. As his popularity continues to increase, he was asked to be a guest tour guide at the first-of-its-kind Punk Rock Museum in Las Vegas, owned by his longtime friend Fat Mike of punk band NOFX. Fat Mike of NOFX says it was seeing Royer perform when he was a teenager that inspired his own punk rock career. Noodles from the rock band The Offspring also cites D.I. and Royer as musical inspiration, as the two bands appeared on billings together during The Offspring's early musical career.

== Personal life ==
Royer was married in 1988 and had a son, Max Royer. After the marriage dissolved, Royer had a second son who is named Casey Royer, Pt. II, the Sequel. Royer raised his second son on his own.
