= Punk Rock Bowling Music Festival =

American punk rock festival

Punk Rock Bowling and Music Festival
- Genre: Punk rock
- Dates: Presidents day weekend (until 2009), Memorial Day weekend (2010-present)
- Locations: Las Vegas, Nevada, U.S.
- Years active: 1999–2019, 2021, 2023-present
- Founders: Shawn Stern, Mark Stern
- Website: punkrockbowling.com

The Punk Rock Bowling and Music Festival is an annual outdoor punk rock festival held since 1999 mixing a bowling tournament and live music performances.

The first occurrence was held in 1999 with a show at the now-defunct Huntridge Theater and originally based as a casual get-together bowling tournament and party for punk rock musicians, labels, fanzines and friends.

The live music components grew over the years into a full-fledged music festival from 2010 onwards including a 3-day outdoor music festival with additional night clubs performances, live music pool-parties, poker and bowling tournaments as well as other associated entertainment or punk culture events.

Notable acts such as Social Distortion, Devo, the Damned, Skatalites, and Suicidal Tendencies have performed at the festival, supported by smaller local bands from Las Vegas and other cities. As of 2024, it is estimated that eight to ten thousand people attend the festival per day.

The event became part of the Downtown Las Vegas entertainment offer and happened there every year with the exception of 2010 (held in Henderson, Nevada), 2020 and 2022 (did not occur due to the Covid-19 pandemic). The 2016 edition also included an additional weekend held in Asbury Park, New Jersey and Denver, Colorado.

== History ==
The festival was started in 1999 by brothers Mark Stern and Shawn Stern, members of the band Youth Brigade and owners of the independent record label BYO Records. Before moving to Las Vegas, a predecessor to the event was an amateur bowling tournament at Santa Monica's Bay Shore Lanes for local labels, zines, and bands in the SoCal punk community. BYO Records employee Andre Duguay, who ran the original SoCal league tournament, suggested the Sterns start a bowling night similar to Fat Wreck Chords' bowling league in San Francisco.

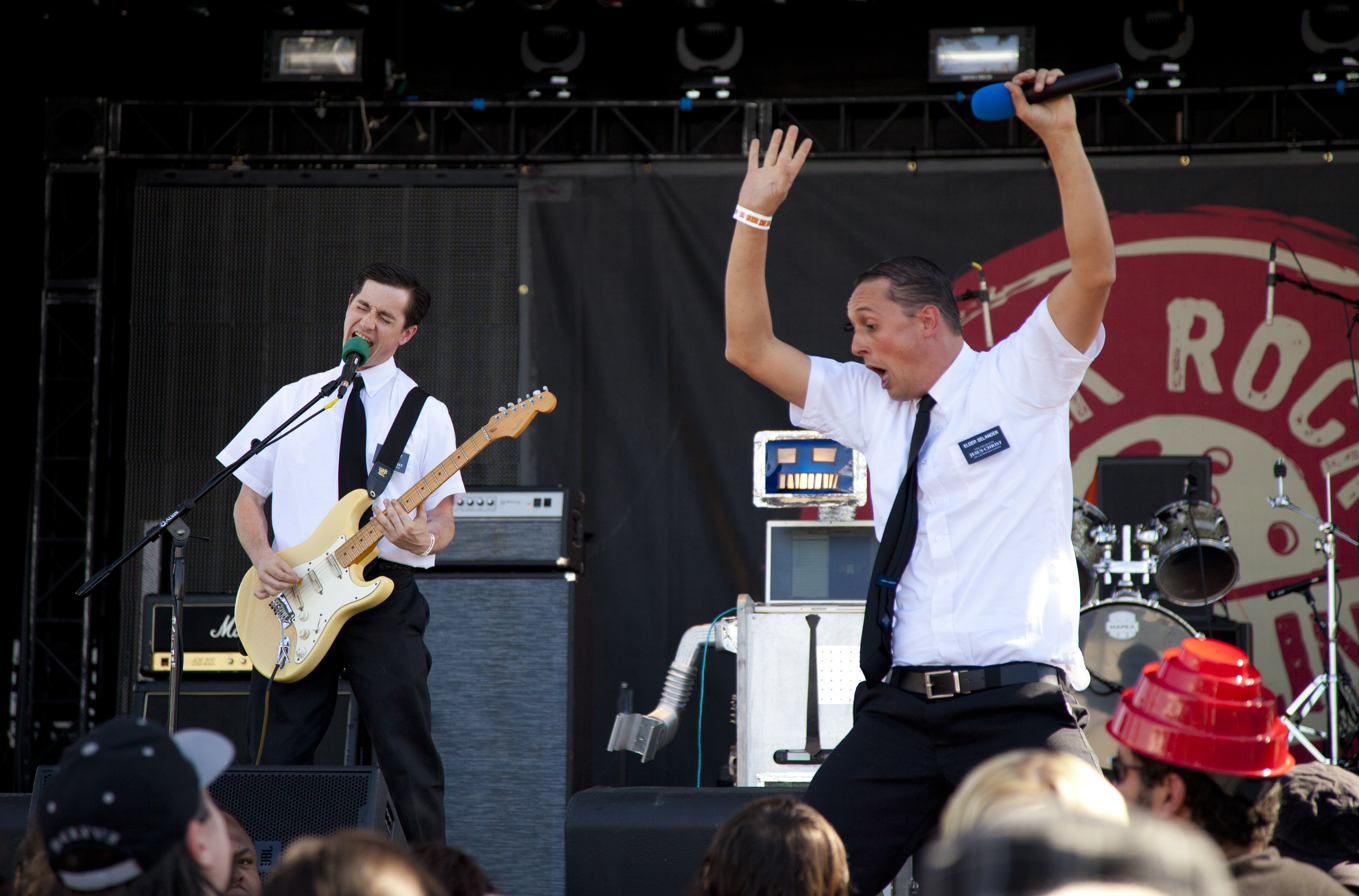
Band Tartar Control performing in 2013.

From 1999 to 2009, the festival took place during Presidents' Day weekend, and from 2010 forward has been on Memorial Day weekend. Originally held with the bowling tournament at the Gold Coast Hotel and Casino and the live music at Huntridge Theater, the event moved to Sam's Town in 2006, and in 2010 again moved to Sunset Station, as the venue had both an amphitheater and a bowling alley. From 2011 forward, the festival has been held in Downtown Las Vegas.

Due to the Covid-19 pandemic, the festival was canceled in 2020 and 2022.

In 2025, three bands from the Mexico, Sweden, and United Kingdom were unable to perform at the festival due to visa issues for entering the United States, which the organizers attributed to "xenophobic hysteria at the border". In line with punk music's historical focus on social and political issues, according to the LA Times, organizer Shawn Stern "sees his platform as an artist and a festival host as a crucial way to remind everyone to stand up against authoritarianism and fascism even if it's not directly affecting you and your surroundings just yet."

== Lineups by year 1999-2009 ==
=== 13–14 February 1999 - DIY Bowling Tournament ===
Bowling tournament at the Gold Coast Hotel and Casino

==== Friday 12 February ====
Kick off party

Location: Double Down Saloon, 4640 Paradise Rd, Las Vegas, Nevada

- Me First and the Gimme Gimmes

==== Saturday 13 February ====
Festival

Location: Huntridge Theater

- Dropkick Murphys
- NOFX
- Pulley
- Rancid
- The Aquabats!
- The Casualties
- The Damned

=== 18–20 February 2000 - 2nd Annual DIY Bowling Tournament ===
Bowling tournament at the Gold Coast Hotel and Casino

Live music

Location: Huntridge Theater

==== Friday 18 February ====
- NOFX
- T.S.O.L.

==== Saturday 19 February ====
- Dillinger Four
- Welt
- Enemy U
- Punk Rock Karaoke (in the lounge of the Huntridge)

=== 16–18 February 2001 - 3rd Annual DIY Bowling Tournament ===
Bowling tournament at the Gold Coast Hotel and Casino

Live music

==== Friday 16 February ====
Location: House of Blues

- Lagwagon
- NOFX
- Pistol Grip

=== 15–17 February 2002 - 4th Annual Punk Rock Bowling Tournament ===
Bowling tournament at the Gold Coast Hotel and Casino

Live music

Location: Hurricane Harry's, 3190 W Sahara, Las Vegas, Nevada

==== Friday 15 February ====
- Jackass
- Manic Hispanic
- The Lawrence Arms

==== Saturday 16 February ====
- Alkaline Trio
- Bouncing Souls

=== 7–9 February 2003 - 5th Annual Punk Rock Bowling Tournament ===
Bowling tournament at the Castaways Bowling Center, 2800 Fremont St Las Vegas, Nevada

Live music

==== Friday 7 February ====
Location: Huntridge Theater

- Dropkick Murphys
- The Forgotten
- The Unseen

==== Saturday 8 February ====
Location: Huntridge Theater

- GBH
- Circle Jerks
- Toxic Narcotic
- Daycare Swindlers

Location: Castaways Bowling Centre Cantina

- Manic Hispanic

=== 6–8 February 2004 - 6th Annual Punk Rock Bowling Tournament ===
Bowling tournament at the Castaways Bowling Center, 2800 Fremont St Las Vegas, Nevada

Live music

==== Friday 6 February ====
Location: House of Blues

- Flogging Molly
- Punk Rock Karaoke
- Throw Rag

==== Saturday 7 February ====
Location: Castaway Bowling Centre Cantina

- Manic Hispanic

Location: Castaways Bowling Centre Lounge

- Flock of Goo Goo
- Harvey Sid Fisher

=== 18–20 February 2005 - 7th Annual Punk Rock Bowling Tournament ===
Bowling tournament at the Gold Coast Hotel and Casino

Live music

==== Saturday 19 February ====
Location: Pink Room of the Gold Coast Hotel and Casino

- Flock of Goo Goo

Location: House of Blues

- Me First and the Gimme Gimmes
- Bouncing Souls
- The Briefs

Location: Rock Room of the Gold Coast Hotel and Casino

- Manic Hispanic

=== 19–22 January 2006 - 8th Annual Punk Rock Bowling Tournament ===
Bowling tournament at Sam's Town

Live music

==== Thursday 19 January ====
Location: Sam's Town Live

- Manic Hispanic

==== Friday 20 January ====
Location: Sam's Town Lounge

- Flock of Goo Goo

Location: Jillian's, 450 S Fremont St, Las Vegas, Nevada

- Swingin Utters
- The Briefs
- The Riverboats Gamblers

=== 18–21 January 2007 - 9th Annual Punk Rock Bowling Tournament ===
Bowling tournament at Sam's Town

Live music

Location: Sam's Town Live

==== Thursday 18 January ====
Kick off party

- Dillinger Four
- Nothington
- Strike Anywhere
- Bouncing Souls

==== Sunday 21 January ====
Award Ceremony

- Black Flag
- Me First and the Gimme Gimmes

=== 17–20 January 2008 - 10th Annual Punk Rock Bowling Tournament ===
Bowling tournament at Sam's Town

Live music and entertainment

==== Friday 18 January ====
Friday night kick off party

Location: Sam's Town

- 7Seconds
- Youth Brigade
- Adolescents
- American Steel
- Nothington

==== Saturday 19 January ====
Movie premiere: "Let The Know" - The story of Youth Brigade and BYO Recoards

==== Sunday 20 January ====
Award party

Location: Canyon Club, 202 Fremont St, Las Vegas, Nevada

- Manic Hispanic

=== 15–18 January 2009 - ===
Bowling tournament at Sam's Town

Live music

==== Friday 16 January ====
Location: El Premier Nightclub, 3015, E Fremont St, Las Vegas, Nevada

- Dwarves
- The Casualties
- American Steel
- The Ignorant
- Off With Their Heads

==== Saturday 17 January ====
Location: House of Blues

- Pennywise
- Circle Jerks
- Channel 3
- The Darlings

==== Sunday 18 January ====
Location: House of Blues

- Pennywise
- Pulley
- The Vandals
- Tiltwheel

Location: El Premier Nightclub, 3015, E Fremont St, Las Vegas, Nevada

- Manic Hispanic
- The Bodies

== Lineups by year 2010-2020 ==
=== 7–9 May 2010 - Punk Rock Bowling and Music Festival, Henderson, Nevada ===
Bowling tournament at Sunset Station (hotel and casino)

Live music festival and clubs

==== Friday 7 May ====
Location: Sunset Station Lounge - Club Madrid

- The Phenomenauts
- Filthy Thieving Bastards
- Old Man Markley

Location: Sunset Amphitheater

- NOFX
- Hot Water Music
- Fucked Up
- Teenage Bottlerocket
- Tony Sly
- Youth Brigade
- Guilty by Association

==== Saturday 8 May ====
Location: Sunset Station Lounge - Club Madrid

- Revival Tour featuring Chuck Ragan and Ben Nichols

Location: Sunset Amphitheater

- Flogging Molly
- Against Me!
- The Riverboat Gamblers
- Broadway Calls
- Cobra Skulls
- Swingin Utters
- Old Man Markley

==== Sunday 9 May ====
Location: Sunset Station Lounge - Club Madrid

- Me First and the Gimme Gimmes
- Saint Alvia
- The Cute Lepers

Location: Sunset Amphitheater

- Adolescents
- Channel 3
- T.S.O.L.
- 7Seconds
- Ill Repute
- D.R.I.
- Stretch Marks
- The Crowd
- The Dickies
- Dr. Know

=== 27–30 May 2011 - 13th Annual Punk Rock Bowling Music Festival ===
==== Friday 27 May ====
Location:

=== 25–28 May 2012 - 14th Annual Punk Rock Bowling & Music Festival ===
==== Friday 25 May ====
Location:

=== 24–27 May 2013 - 15th Annual Punk Rock Bowling & Music Festival ===
==== Friday 24 May ====
Location:

=== 23–26 May 2014 - Punk Rock Bowling & Music Festival ===
==== Friday 23 May ====
Location:

=== 22–25 May 2015 - 17th Annual Punk Rock Bowling & Music Festival ===
==== Friday 22 May ====
Location:

=== 2016 ===
==== 26–30 May 2016 - Las Vegas, Nevada Punk Rock Bowling & Music Festival ====
===== Friday 27 May =====
Location:

==== 10–12 June 2016 - Asbury Park, New Jersey Punk Rock Bowling & Music Festival ====
===== Saturday 11 June =====
Location:

=== 27–29 May 2017 - Punk Rock Bowling & Music Festival ===
==== Friday 26 May ====
Location:

=== 25–28 May 2018 - Punk Rock 20th Bowling & Music Festival ===
==== Friday 25 May ====
Location:

=== 24–27 May 2019 - 21st Punk Rock Bowling & Music Festival ===
==== Friday 24 May ====
Location:

=== 21–25 May 2020 - 22nd Annual Punk Rock Bowling ===
First postponed to September, the event was subsequently cancelled due to the Covid-19 pandemic. Parts of the planned lineups were rescheduled to 2021.

== Lineups by year 2021 onwards ==
=== 24–26 September 2021 - 22nd Annual Punk Rock Bowling ===
Originally planned for May 2021, the ongoing Covid-19 pandemic situation forced the event to be held in the Fall.

==== Thursday 23 September ====
Kick off party

Location: Backstage Bar & Billiards, 601 E Fremont St, Las Vegas

- D.I.
- Angry Samoans
- Monique Powell (Save Ferris)
- Lean 13
- DJ Lethal

Location: Sonic Rodeo Stage

- Fear
- Pegboy
- M.I.A.
- The Besmirchers

Location: Fremont Country Club, 601 E Fremont St, Las Vegas

- Dillinger Four
- Get Dead
- Teenage Bottlerocket

==== Friday 24 September ====
Morning Pool Party

Location: Citrus Grand Pool Deck

Festival

Monster Energy Stage

- Jerk!
- The Linecutters
- Bad Cop/Bad Cop
- Pears
- Dwarves
- The Queers
- Anti-Flag

Main Stage

- The Sunnydales
- The Darts
- FYP
- Dillinger Four
- The Menzingers
- Frank Turner
- The Descendents

Club shows

Location: Nerd Bar, 450 E Fremont St, Las Vegas

- Dr. Know
- Ill Repute
- False Confession
- Stäläg 13

Location: Sonic Rodeo Stage

- Lunachicks
- Dog Party
- Mean Jeans

Location: Fremont Country Club, 601 E Fremont St, Las Vegas

- The Run Around
- Strung Out
- Make War
- Suicide Machines

Location: Backstage Bar & Billiards, 601 E Fremont St, Las Vegas

- Guttermouth
- Narcoleptic Youth
- Modern Action
- Gob Patrol

==== Saturday 25 September ====
Morning Pool Party

Location: Citrus Grand Pool Deck

- Guttermouth
- Babe Patrol

Festival

Monster Energy Stage

- Suburban Resistance
- Decent Criminal
- Field Day
- Plague Vendor
- The Bronx
- The Aggrolites
- Youth of Today

Main Stage

- The Side Eyes
- Urethane
- Good Riddance
- Youth Brigade
- Leftover Crack
- Streetlight Manifesto
- Circle Jerks

Club shows

Location: Citrus Grand Pool Deck

- Laura Jane Grace
- Crazy and The Brains
- Drakulas
- A Giant Dog

Location: Fremont Country Club, 601 E Fremont St, Las Vegas

- Madball
- H2O
- 8 Kalacas
- D.F.L.

Location: Nerd Bar, 450 E Fremont St, Las Vegas

- MDC
- Verbal Abuse
- Middle Aged Queers

Location: Sonic Rodeo Stage

- Days N Daze
- Left Alone
- The Potato Pirates
- Dead 77

Location: Backstage Bar & Billiards, 601 E Fremont St, Las Vegas

- Lower Class Brats
- Slaughterhouse
- Hanover Saints
- Liberty & Justice

==== Sunday 26 September ====
Morning Brunch Event

- Blag Dahlia (from the Dwarves) acoustic set

Morning Pool Party

Location: Citrus Grand Pool Deck

- Dr. Know
- Field Day

Festival

Monster Energy Stage

- The Twits
- Crazy & The Brains
- Bridge City Sinners
- MDC
- Riverboat Gamblers
- The English Beat
- Municipal Waste

Main Stage

- Babe Patrol
- The Last Gang
- The Schizophonics
- All
- Murder City Devils
- Lunachicks
- Devo

Club shows

Location: Citrus Grand Pool Deck

- The Slackers

Location: Fremont Country Club, 601 E Fremont St, Las Vegas

- Slapshot
- Overexposure
- Youth of Today as surprise guest

Location: Sonic Rodeo Stage

- The Unseen
- Defiance
- Starving Wolves
- Soldiers of Destruction

Location: Backstage Bar & Billiards, 601 E Fremont St, Las Vegas

- Punk Rock Karaoke
- Toys That Kills
- Infamous Stiffs
- Raptors

=== 2022 ===
The event did not occur due to the ongoing Covid-19 pandemic.

=== 26–29 May 2023 - 23rd Annual Punk Rock Bowling & Music Festival ===
==== Thursday 25 May ====
Kick off party

Location: Fremont Country Club

- Dwarves
- Dead Boys
- Zeke
- Angelo Moore (Fishbone) presents Dr. Madd Vibe and the Missin Links
- Lean 13

==== Friday 26 May ====
Club Shows

Location:

Location: Citrus Grand

- Reverend Horton Heat
- The Delta Bombers
- Julian James & The Lovebombs
- The Luxuries
- Greg Antista & The Lonely Streets
- Los Empties

Location: Backstage Bar

- The Avengers
- The Skulls
- The Venomous Pinks
- Some Kind of Nightmare
- Unit F

Location: Place on 7th

- Lion's Law
- Wisdom & Chains
- Militarie Gun
- Anti-Vision
- H.A.L.T.

Location: Fremont

- Youth Brigade
- Swingin Utters
- The Side Eyes
- Loud Graves
- Bad Thoughts

Location: The Usual Place

- The Real McKenzies
- The Goddamn Gallows
- Flatfoot 56
- Doll Riot
- Battle Flask

Location: Sand Dollar Downtown

- Agent Orange
- J.F.A.
- The Take
- After The Fall
- Pure Sport

==== Saturday 27 May ====
Location: Citrus Grand

- Lion's Law
- Booze & Glory
- The Provos

Festival

Monster Energy Stage

- The Dollheads
- Dee Skusting & The Rodents
- The Crowd
- Surfbort
- Adolescents
- The Slackers
- Fishbone

Main Stage

- The Venomous Pinks
- Suzi Moon
- Channel 3 (CH3)
- Fesr
- Me First and the Gimme Gimmes
- The Interrupters
- Bad Religion

Club Shows

Location: Citrus Grand

- Roy Ellis and the Aggrolites
- Bedouin Soundclash
- The Skints
- Bad Operation
- Amalgamated
- Robert Stokes Band

Location: Fremont

- NIIS
- Slaughterhouse
- Alice Bag
- Me First and the Gimme Gimmes (billed as special guest)

Location: Place on 7th

- Strung Out
- The Copyrights
- Western Addiction
- Washed

Location: The Usual Place

- Anti-Heros
- The Generators
- Antagonizer
- Hunting Lions

Location: Backstage Bar

- The Briefs
- Wine Lips
- Spiritual Cramp
- Rat Fuck

Location: Sand Dollar

- Ignite
- Pulley
- End It
- The Hate

==== Sunday 28 May ====
Location: Citrus Grand

- The Briefs
- Bad Operation
- TV Party

Festival

Monster Energy Stage

- GBH
- The Casualties
- Anti-Heros
- Sloppy Seconds
- End It!
- Speed of Light
- Madam Bombs

Main Stage

- Rancid
- The Damned
- Face to Face
- Roy Ellis with the Aggrolites
- Noi!se
- Playboy Manbaby
- Rough Kids

Club Shows

Location: Citrus Grand

- Fishbone
- HR of Bad Brains
- Son Rompe Pers
- Los Astakados
- Secos
- Eclipse

Location: Fremont

- L7
- Svetlanas
- Grade 2
- Informal Society

Location: Backstage Bar

- The Dickies
- Ultrabomb
- Dog Party
- Winkler

Location: Place on 7th

- Booze & Glory
- The Rumjacks
- The Bar Stool Preachers
- The Provos

Location: Sand Dollar

- Against All Authority
- Redshift
- Shock Therapy
- Not For Sale

Location: The Usual Place

- Manic Hispanic
- Left Alone
- Vulturas
- Diskount Vodka

==== Monday 29 May ====
Location: Citrus Grand

- Sloppy Seconds
- Playboy Manbaby
- Madam Bombs

Festival

Monster Energy Stage

- The Exploited
- Agnostic Front
- The Chisel
- Fea
- Svetlanas
- Infamous Stiffs
- Desert Island Boys

Main Stage

- Dropkick Murphys
- L7
- Suicidal Tendencies
- Hepcat
- Ultrabomb
- Doki Doki
- Ratfuck

Club Shows

Location: Fremont

- TSOL
- Punk Rock Karaoke
- Spider
- The Infirmities

Location: Backstage Bar

- The Beltones
- The Chisel
- The Drowns
- Speed of Light

=== 24–27 May 2024 - 24th Annual Punk Rock Bowling & Music Festival ===
==== Thursday 23 May ====
Kick off party

Location: Fremont Country Club, 601 E Fremont St, Las Vegas

- DJ Lethal
- Strate Jacket
- Tim & the Polecats
- Calavera
- The Meteors
- El Vez

Location: The Usual Place, 100 S Maryland Pkwy, Las Vegas

Special screening of Punk Rock feature film 'Wrong Reasons (2022)' - hosted by Kevin Smith.

Live music

- Empired
- Franks & Deans
- The Aggrolites

==== Friday 24 May ====
Agnostic Front Art exhibit '40-years victim in pain' including signing by Vinnie Stigma and Roger Miret at The Notoriety

Club shows

Location: Citrus Grand Pool Deck

- All
- Bad Cop/Bad Cop
- Iron Roses
- Teen Mortgage
- Dollheads
- The Not

Location: Backstage Bar & Billiards, 601 E Fremont St, Las Vegas

- Redd Kross
- Playboy Manbaby
- The Side Eyes
- Spoon Benders
- Cosmic Kitten

Location: The Notoriety Chandelier Room

- Generacion Suicida
- Home Front
- DAK (Descartes A Kant)
- Terminal A
- Spelling Hands

Location: Sonic Rodeo Stage

- Throw Rag
- The Humpers
- Electric Frankenstein
- Thee Toe Tags
- Marching Party

Location: Fremont Country Club, 601 E Fremont St, Las Vegas

- Agnostic Front
- Underdog
- Conservative Military Image
- Problem
- Species

Location: The Notoriety Padded Room

- 8 Kalacas
- 3LH
- La Pobreska
- Sancho Villa
- Skabrones

Location: The Usual Place, 100 S Maryland Pkwy, Las Vegas

- Swami and the Bed of Nails
- Tijuana Panthers
- Toys That Kill
- Sweat
- Pure Sport

Location: The Sand Dollar downtown, 1 S Main St, Las Vegas

- Los Yesterdays
- Johnny Ruiz & The Escapers
- The Inciters
- Roots & the Barrio
- DJ Tommy Gunn

Location: The Notoriety Lounge

- Mac Sabbath
- Fartbarf
- Bonavega
- The Mormons
- Ukelele Hiro

==== Saturday 25 May ====
Matinee Pool Parties

- Bonavega
- DAK (Descartes A Kant)
- Home Front

Other matinee activities

- Screening of feature documentary 'The Art of Protest (2020)' and 'Ghost of the Chelsea Hotel - and other Rock & Roll Stories (2023)' at The Notoriety
- Agnostic Front Art exhibit '40-years victim in pain' including signing by Vinnie Stigma and Roger Miret at The Notoriety
- Bowling tournament preliminaries (126 teams of 4 people) at Sam's Town

Festival

Street Party Stage

- Katie Overbey and the Backlash
- The Iron Roses
- Teen Mortgage
- 999
- Madball
- Gorilla Biscuits

Main Stage

- Twist Off!
- Bad Cop/Bad Cop
- Skatalites
- Lagwagon
- Billy Bragg
- Descendents

Club shows

Location: Citrus Grand Pool Deck

- Suicide Machines
- Buck-O-Nine
- Escape From The Zoo
- Catbite
- Göners ÜK

Location: Backstage Bar & Billiards, 601 E Fremont St, Las Vegas

- Starcrawler
- Niis
- Slaughterhouse
- Soldiers of Destruction

Location: The Notoriety Chandelier Room

- Fear
- Zeke
- Røbber
- The Plagues

Location: Sonic Rodeo Stage

- The Queers
- Dwarves
- FYP
- Sidekick

Location: Fremont Country Club, 601 E Fremont St, Las Vegas

- The Chats billed as 'surprise guest'
- Cosmic Psychos
- The Fiends!
- Gus Baldwin & The Sketch

Location: The Notoriety Padded Room

- Mess
- Pistol Grip
- 21 Gun Salute
- Strongarm and the Bullies

Location: The Usual Place, 100 S Maryland Pkwy, Las Vegas

- Guitar Wolf
- The Lords of Altamont
- Schizophonics
- Shakewells

Location: The Sand Dollar downtown, 1 S Main St, Las Vegas

- Rich Kids on LSD (RKL)
- Dr Know
- The Grim
- Romper

Location: The Notoriety Lounge

- The Zeros
- The Hangmen
- Egg Drop Soup
- Madam bombs

==== Sunday 26 May ====
Matinee Pool Parties

- Zeke
- Doll Riot
- The Inciters
- Madam Bombs

Other matinee activities

- Screening of feature documentary 'The Art of Protest (2020)' and 'Nightclubbing - The Birth of Punk Rock in NYC (2022)' at The Notoriety
- Bowling tournament finals (32 teams) at Sam's Town - winning team 'Dad Religion'

Festival

Street Party Stage

- Muertos Heist
- Catbite
- Cosmic Psychos
- Snõõper
- Starcrawler
- The Chats

Main Stage

- LA Slum Lord
- Vial
- Niis
- Destroy Boys
- Subhumans
- Rocket From The Crypt
- Devo

Club shows

Location: Citrus Grand Pool Deck

- Billy Bragg
- John Doe
- Chad Hates George
- Ceshi (Codefendants) vs Jen Pop (The Bombpops)

Location: Backstage Bar & Billiards, 601 E Fremont St, Las Vegas

- Lower Class Brats
- Starving Wolves
- Rumkicks
- Nütt

Location: The Notoriety Chandelier Room

- Sonido Gallo Negro
- Sgt. Papers
- Viaje Nahual

Location: Sonic Rodeo Stage

- Lagwagon
- Cigar
- Mean Jeans
- Zach Quinn

Location: Fremont Country Club, 601 E Fremont St, Las Vegas

- Judge
- Madball
- Section H8
- Horripilation

Location: The Notoriety Padded Room

- N8noface
- Codefendants
- Zig Zags
- Knuckleheadz

Location: The Usual Place, 100 S Maryland Pkwy, Las Vegas

- Plague Vendor
- Strawberry Fuzz
- The Pinky Rings
- Kilfeather

Location: The Sand Dollar downtown, 1 S Main St, Las Vegas

- Bratmobile
- Fea
- Neighborhood Brats
- Trap Girl

Location: The Notoriety Lounge

- Saccharine Trust
- Dead Bob
- Covid Cola
- Detective Frog

==== Monday 27 May ====
Matinee Pool Parties

- Vial
- Snõõper
- The Pinky Rings
- DJ Swami John Reis

Festival

Street Party Stage

- Kate Clover
- Die Spitz
- Bratmobile
- Scowl
- Quicksand

Main Stage

- Doll Riot
- Vial
- The English Beat
- Stiff Little Fingers
- Gogol Bordello
- Madness

Club shows

Location: Fremont Country Club, 601 E Fremont St, Las Vegas

- Punk Rock Karaoke
- Guttermouth
- Raptors

Location: Backstage Bar & Billiards, 601 E Fremont St, Las Vegas

- Subhumans
- Die Spitz
- Bad Ass

== See also ==
- List of music festivals
- List of punk rock festivals
- Punk rock
