= Fort Worth Design District =

- Location: Fort Worth, Texas
- Coordinates: 32.933117°N 97.3334209°W
- Address: 1921-1953 Golden Heights Road
- Opened: 2018
- Developer: Ron Sturgeon Real Estate
- Owner: Ron Sturgeon Real Estate
- Floors: 2 to 3
- Website: fortworthdesigndistrict.com

The Fort Worth Design District is an outdoor shopping mall and entertainment complex located in Fort Worth, Texas. The park is a container park, with the tenants being housed in metal cubes and shipping containers. The park was constructed by Ron Sturgeon, and opened in 2018.
