= Downtown Container Park =

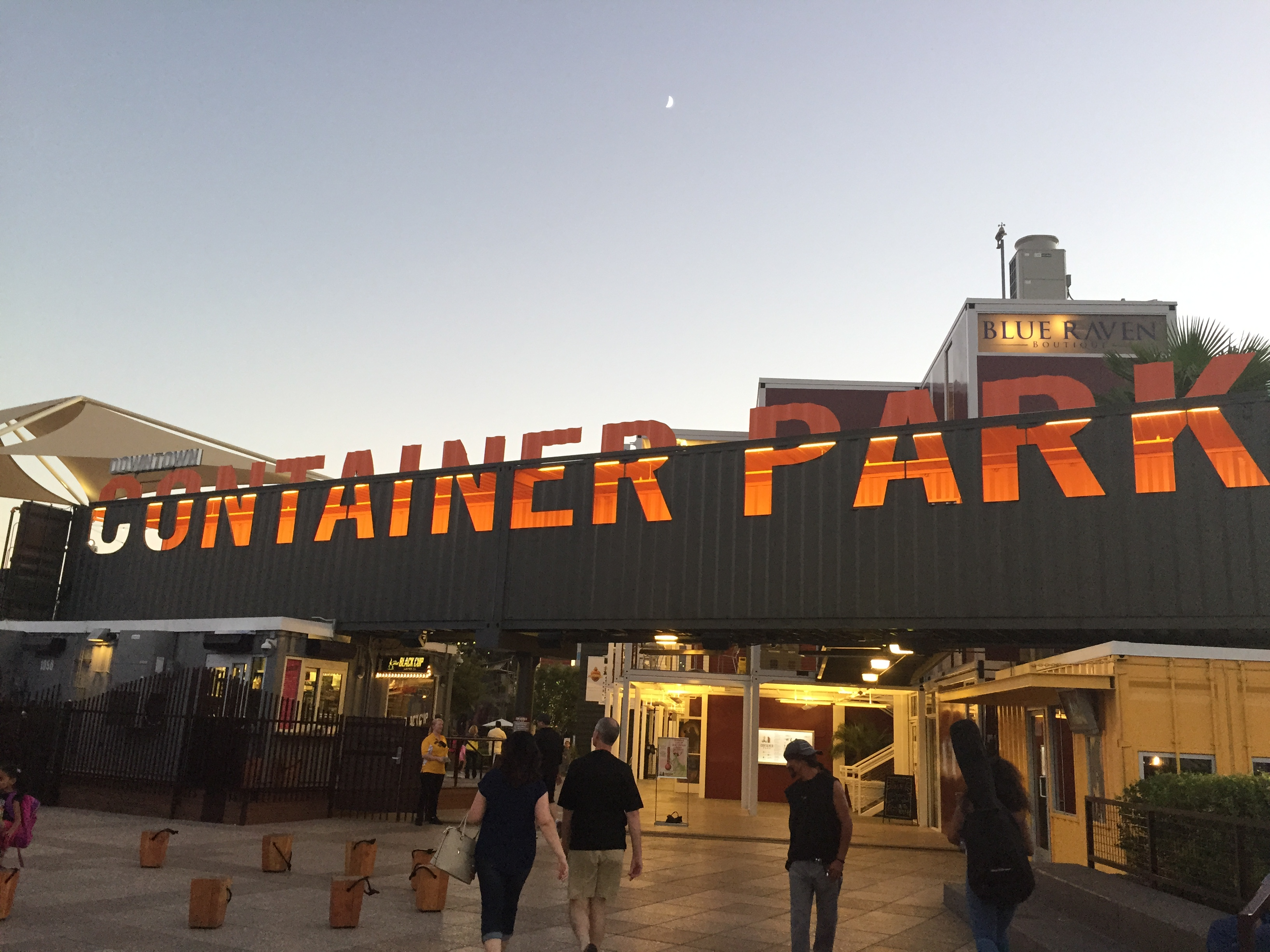
- Entrance
- Location: Downtown Las Vegas, Nevada
- Coordinates: 36.167590°N 115.138432°W
- Address: 707 East Fremont Street
- Opened: November 25, 2013
- Developer: Downtown Project
- Owner: Downtown Project
- Num. of stores: 39
- Floors: 2 to 3
- Website: downtowncontainerpark.com

Downtown Container Park is an outdoor shopping mall and entertainment complex located in downtown Las Vegas, Nevada. The tenants are housed in metal cubes and shipping containers. The project was conceived by Tony Hsieh and his Downtown Project, a group dedicated to revitalizing the downtown area. Construction began in 2012, and the project opened on November 25, 2013, with 34 tenants. The mall includes 43 shipping containers and 41 cubes.

== History ==
=== Construction ===
The Downtown Container Park was conceived by Tony Hsieh and his Downtown Project, a group dedicated to revitalizing downtown Las Vegas. The Container Park project was announced in May 2012, and would include shops, restaurants, and bars built into shipping containers. The idea to use shipping container architecture was inspired by other projects such as Boxpark in London. The Container Park was originally planned for a vacant parcel located on Fremont Street, between 6th and 7th Street. However, the plans expanded and the project was relocated across the street to a 1.3-acre site, at the intersection of 7th Street. The site was previously occupied in the 1960s by the Orbit Inn motel, which later became a Motel 6. Part of the site was also once occupied by a nightclub.

Breslin Builders was the general contractor. Although the project was originally intended to consist only of shipping containers, the design plans were altered to include metal cubes. The cubes, created locally by Xtreme Manufacturing, were usually made for gas, mining and oil excavations. The Downtown Project decided to use cubes for the Container Park after learning of Xtreme Manufacturing, which was headquartered near downtown Las Vegas. The project's shipping containers were provided by ConGlobal Industries, a Los Angeles company. The use of shipping containers was originally seen as a possible cost-saving way to construct the project. However, when the plans were expanded, the final construction costs were roughly equal with traditional building methods.

The Container Park would serve as a place for startup businesses to open. Such businesses would be funded by the Downtown Project. The Container Park was unanimously approved by the Planning Commission in August 2012. However, there were several concerns about the project, including its inward-facing design, which would limit exterior access. The nearby Neonopolis mall used a similar design, and was struggling financially as a result. Because of crime in the downtown area, the project would be largely surrounded by fencing for security, further restricting access. The Container Park would include a children's playground, although there were concerns about having such an attraction in a project that would also serve alcohol. There was also concern that local teenagers would try to procure alcohol from the Container Park.

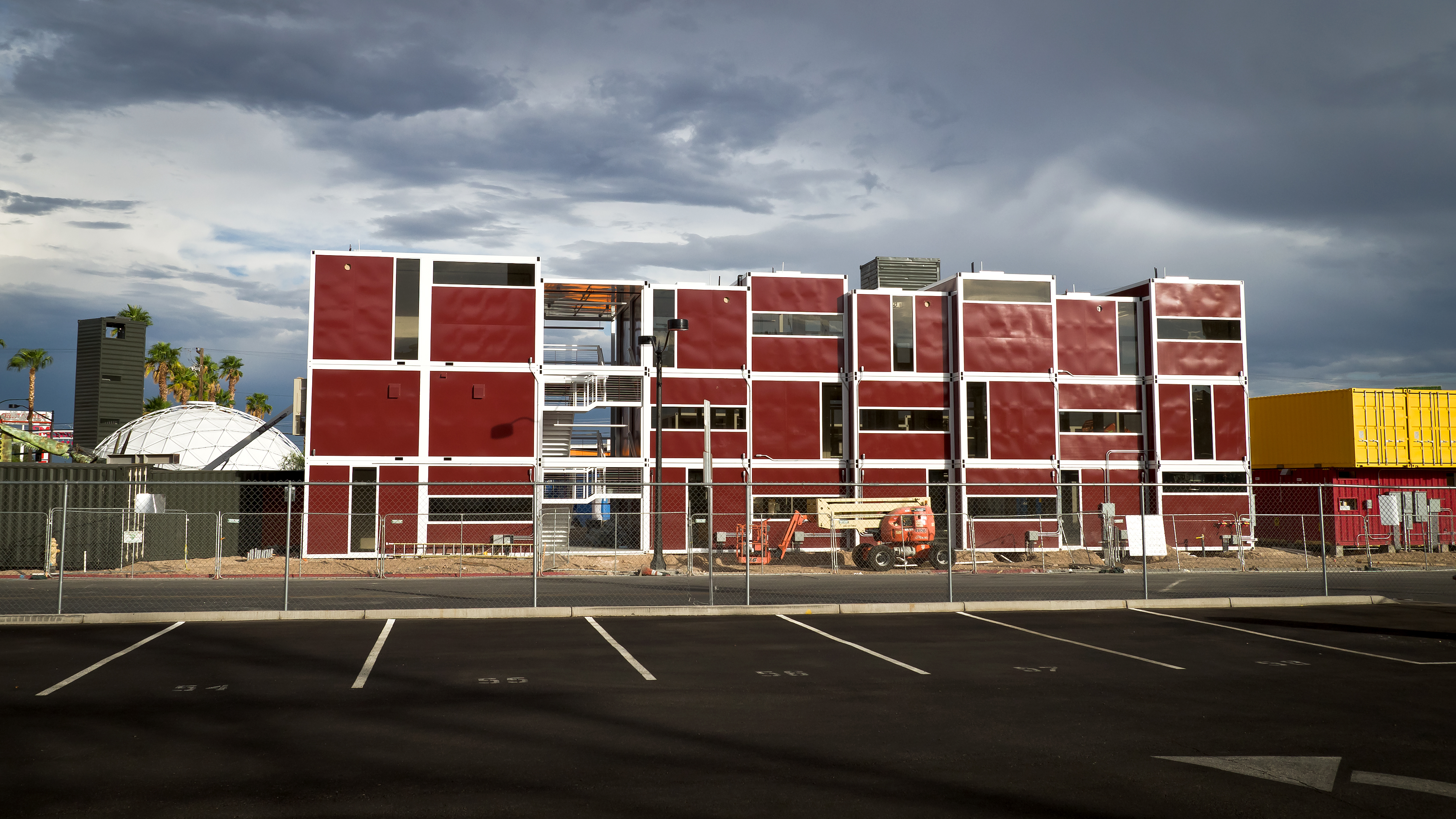
Construction in September 2013

It was determined that the Motel 6 would have been too costly to repurpose, so it was demolished in October 2012. That month, the Las Vegas City Council approved the Container Park and exempted it from a requirement stating that 250 parking spaces needed to be added. This led to concerns about a lack of parking in the area. Construction was underway at the end of 2012, and it lasted a little more than a year. One of the Container Park's focal points is a geodesic dome that projects various landscapes on its interior walls. The dome was constructed in April 2013.

Four months later, the city council approved an ordinance that would allow outdoor entertainment complexes, such as the Container Park, to serve alcohol despite the presence of children. Alcohol would not be allowed in the children's play area. The Container Park ultimately received a temporary tavern license, but only after agreeing not to include exterior signage for Pinches Tacos, one of the project's restaurants. In Spanish, "pinche" is sometimes considered a vulgar word, and its use as a restaurant name prompted criticism.

The Downtown Project initially hoped to have the Container Park open by October 26, 2013, coinciding with the first Life Is Beautiful festival in downtown Las Vegas. Ahead of the project's opening, servers were trained to spot and prevent underage drinking on the premises.

=== Operation ===
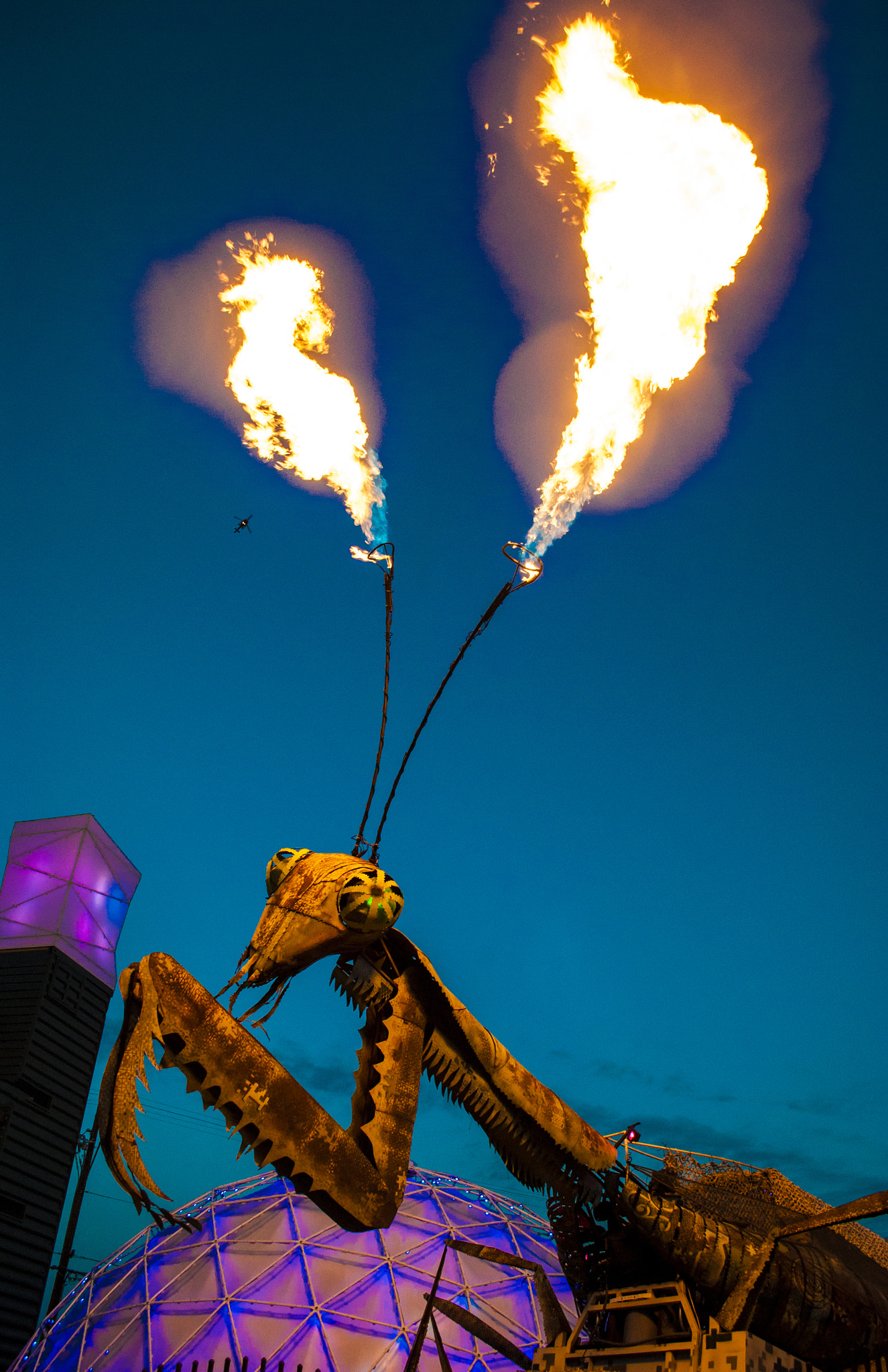
Praying mantis sculpture

Downtown Container Park had a soft opening on November 25, 2013. A larger grand opening was held on December 5, 2013. The Container Park had 153 employees, and 34 tenants, including restaurants, bars, art shops, and clothing stores. The mall includes 43 shipping containers and 41 cubes, with a total of 38 tenant spaces, although some businesses occupy two spaces, causing a fluctuation in the number of tenants. Tenant spaces range from 170 to 800 square feet. Interior dining space is limited in each cube, necessitating the use of outdoor dining tables. The containers, stacked two and three high, were customized for the needs of each business, and were fitted with insulation and windows. In addition to cubes and shipping containers, a railroad caboose was also retrofitted for the project, to house a barbershop. The Downtown Project avoided chain stores in favor of unique tenants. To further maintain a unique shopping experience, tenants were strategically chosen by the Downtown Project in order to avoid having two businesses that offer the same products.

The entrance is marked by a giant metal sculpture, depicting a praying mantis that spews fire from its antennae. The mantis also plays music through seven speakers. An individual operates the mantis from a small interior space. The sculpture was originally built for the annual Burning Man festival. Also located at the entrance is the Love Locket, a heart-shaped sculpture made of metal. Visitors are allowed to attach love locks to the sculpture, which was originally created for the first Life Is Beautiful festival. An outdoor stage is located on-site, and has hosted various musical performances. The playground area includes an artificial tree and treehouse made out of four shipping containers, with slides and interactive play panels.

Because of concerns regarding alcohol, the Container Park has age restrictions to keep children out starting at 9:00 p.m., and children need to be accompanied by adults at all other times. Some customers complained of random bag searches by security guards before being allowed to enter. The searches were done to prevent outside alcohol from being brought onto the premises. The searches were largely discontinued a few weeks after the opening.

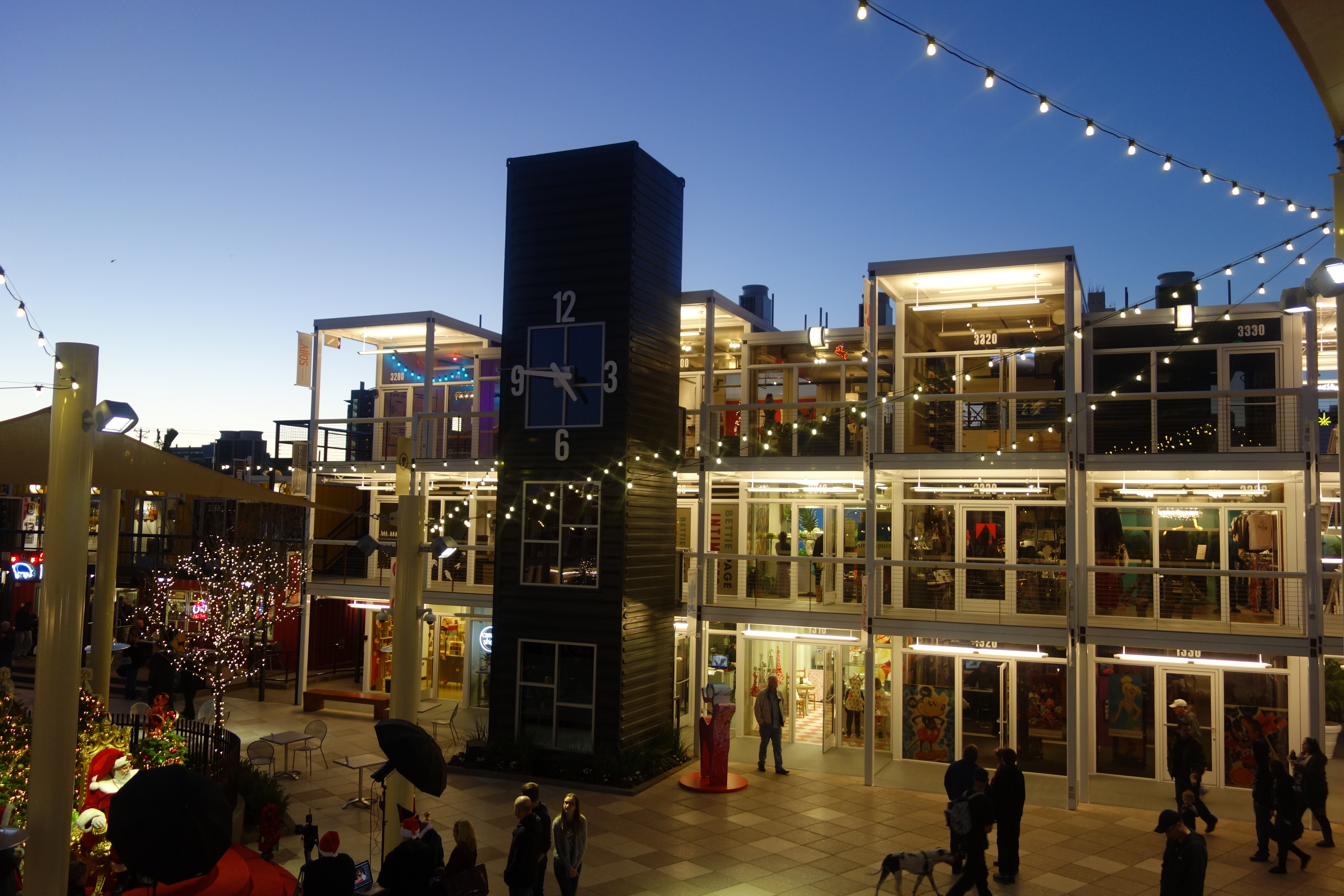
Shops during Christmas time

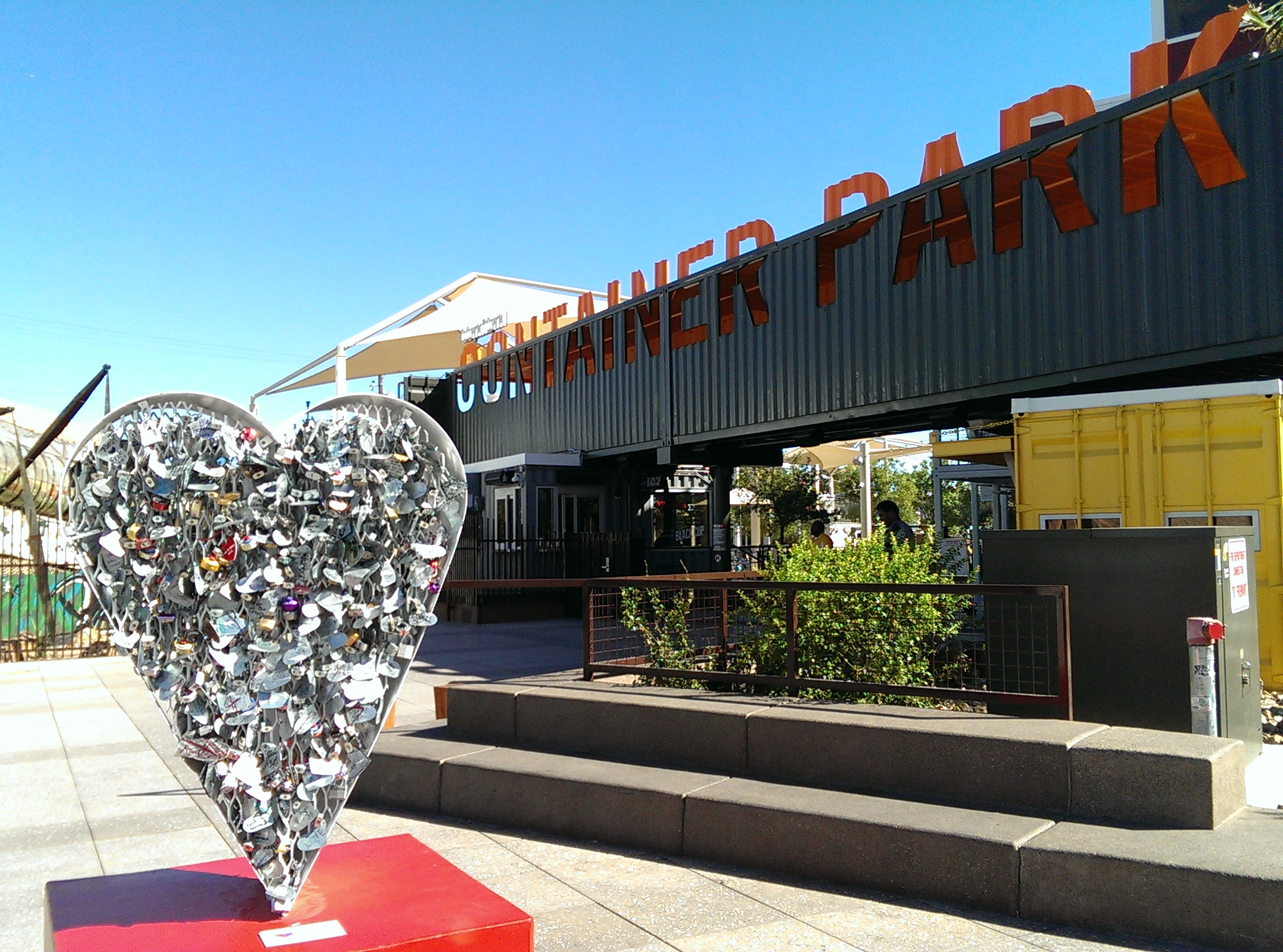
Love Locket sculpture

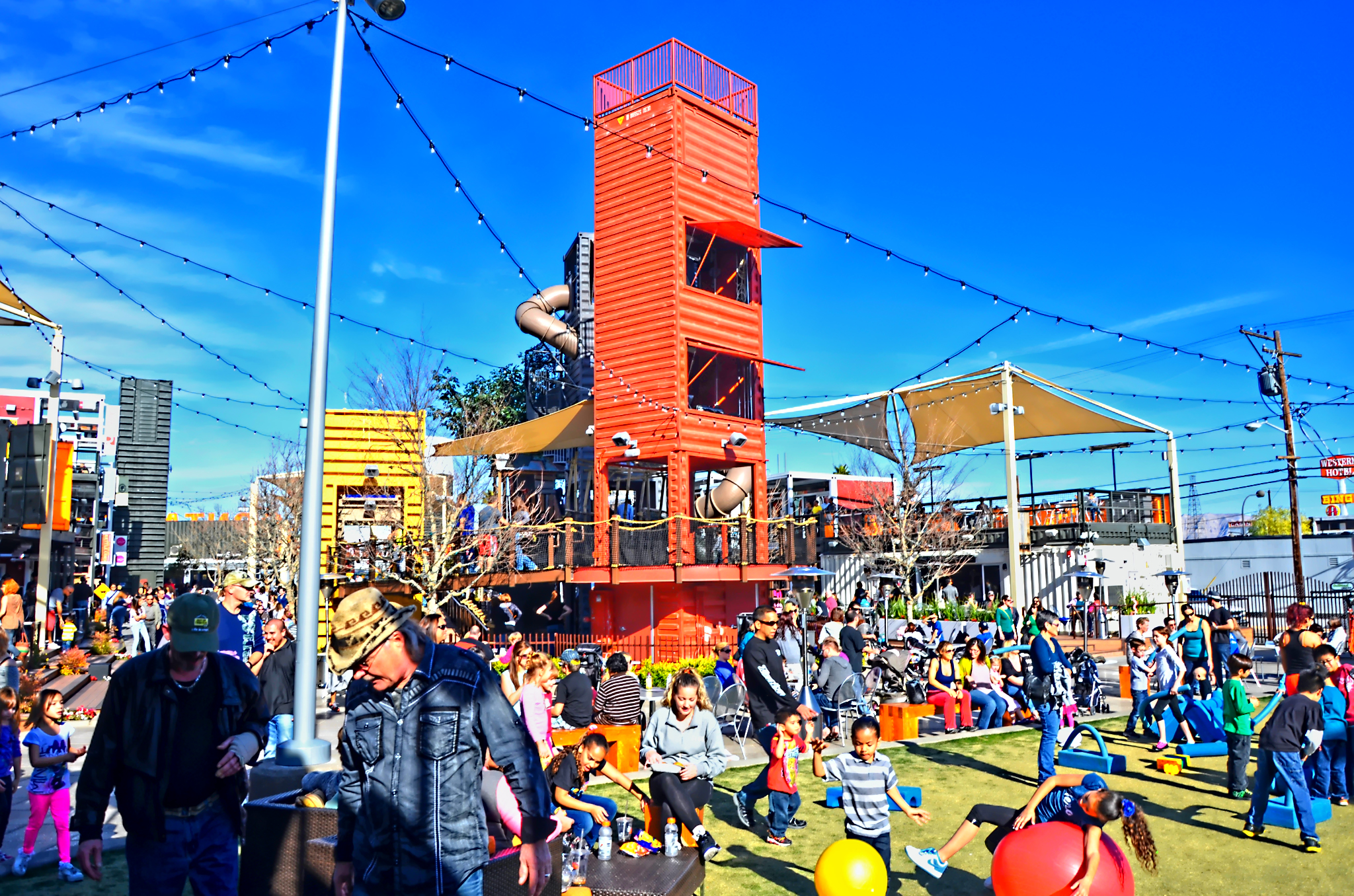
Playground area

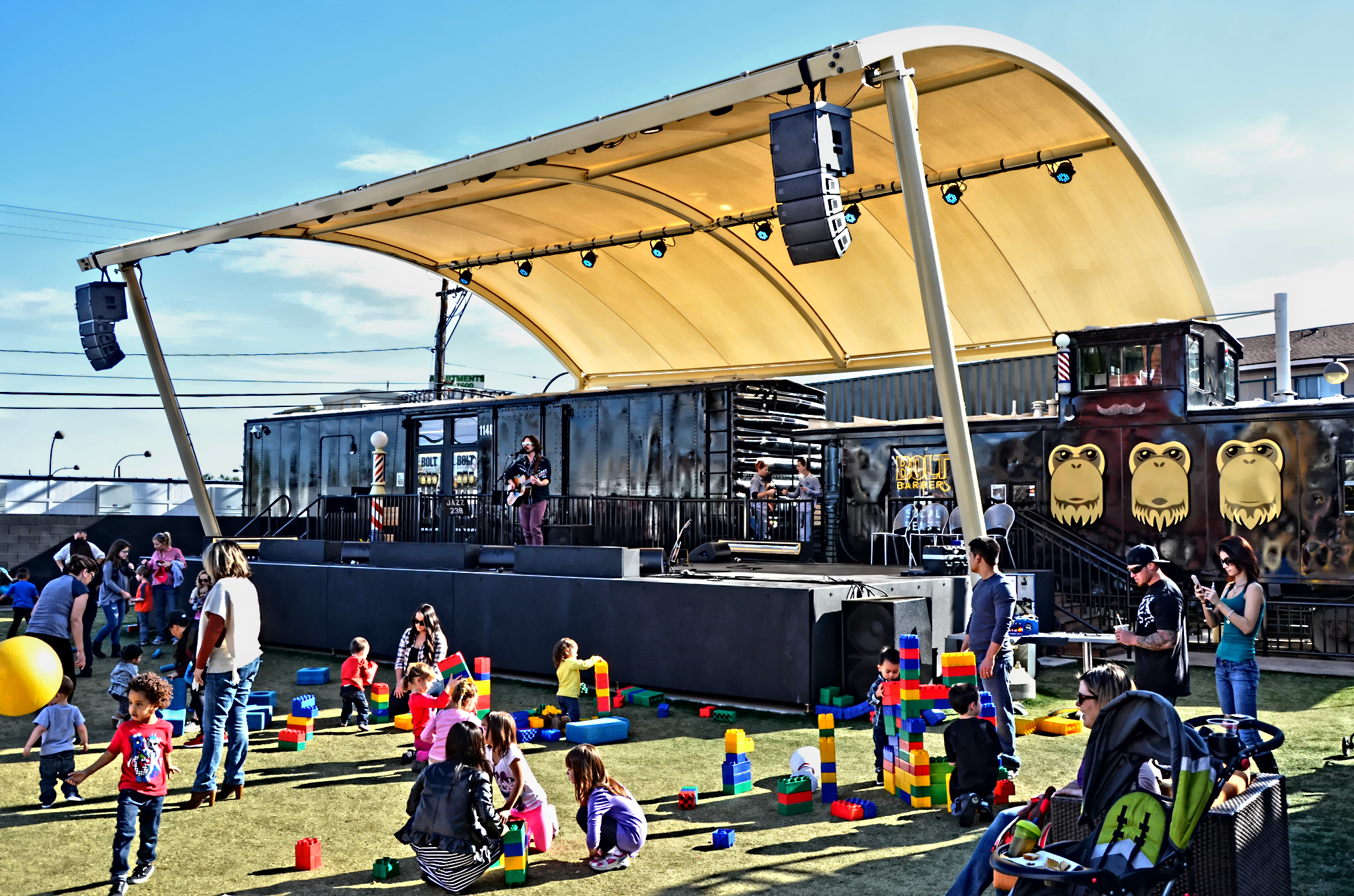
Outdoor stage

Early revenue exceeded expectations. Within three months of its opening, the property had attracted 300,000 visitors. Among families, the playground area was particularly popular. In February 2014, the city council voted to allow minors to enter the playground unattended, as long as they could provide identification. The nearby Las Vegas Academy had requested the change, as students wanted to perform at the Container Park.

Some tenant leases were written to last only a few months, and several businesses closed in April 2014. The Container Park's first full-service restaurant opened later that year. Five new tenants opened in April 2015. Las Vegas mayor Carolyn Goodman attended a ribbon-cutting ceremony to mark the occasion. Two months later, Goodman welcomed five more new tenants to the mall.

At the end of 2015, some current and former tenants expressed their frustration with the Container Park, saying that they received $75 fines from the Downtown Project for various offenses. The Downtown Project defended the fines and said they were in response to violations regarding the rules of operations. Such violations included tenants not being present to operate their businesses at all times. Earlier that year, the Container Park had considered letting tenants choose their own hours of operation, but ultimately decided against the idea, stating that consistent hours for all tenants would provide a better experience for shoppers.

Tenants also complained about a lack of foot traffic on the third floor, in part because of an elevator that would allegedly break down after rain storms. Tenants also alleged that the Downtown Project failed to adequately market the third floor. At the time, the Container Park had 32 businesses; 14 of them were original tenants from the mall's opening two years earlier. A wedding chapel was added at the end of 2015.

The Container Park's dome was originally rented out for private events such as cocktail parties, with capacity for 75 people. In April 2017, the dome began operating as a theater for short educational movies, as well as videos set to music by rock bands. The theater also offered an interactive laser tag video in which viewers shoot at asteroids. At the end of 2018, the Container Park had 39 tenants and averaged 2,000 daily visitors. Up to that time, the mall had attracted five million total visitors.

== See also ==
- Cosford Container Park, a similar park in Singapore.
