= Container park =

Retail spaces in shipping containers

A container park is a type of outdoor shopping or dining park in which the businesses are typically housed in shipping containers.

== Singapore ==
- Cosford Container Park

== United Kingdom ==
The first UK boxpark was created in Shoreditch, London, in 2011.

Other cities have featured temporary container parks, including Sheffield, Manchester and York.

== United States ==
- Downtown Container Park
- Fort Worth Design District
- Arlington, Texas – due to open in 2024

== See also ==
- Shipping container architecture
