= Cosford Container Park =

- Location: Changi, Singapore
- Coordinates: 1.3654°N 103.9787°E
- Address: 30 Cosford Road, Singapore 499550
- Opened: 29 January 2024
- Developer: Tee Tree Investments

Cosford Container Park is an outdoor entertainment complex located in downtown Changi, Singapore. The tenants are housed in metal cubes and shipping containers.

The park opened on 29 January 2024.

== History ==
In the 1930s, Cosford Road, the site used for the construction of Cosford Container Park, originally housed the main artillery of the British during World War II and has since been marked as a historic site by the National Heritage Board. In 1942, when the Japanese invaded Singapore from the Malay Peninsula, two of the sea-facing guns at Johore Battery were used to fire towards land and were later destroyed.

In 2023, plans to develop a site nearby Changi Airport were revealed, using 13 shipping containers for food and beverage. It was originally planned to be opened in the third quarter of 2023 and would cost S$3 million.

Opened on 29 January 2024, Cosford Container Park is Singapore's largest outdoor container park. The park has 13 food stores.

On 11 May 2025, Cosford Container Park hosted Singapore’s first mermaid tank performance in collaboration with local troupe The Dancing Mermaid, founded by Aliyah Wong. Held over Mother's Day weekend, the event featured choreographed routines in a transparent water tank and attracted large crowds and media attention.

The initiative is part of the park’s broader aim to serve as a cultural and recreational destination, offering a mix of heritage, gastronomy, and immersive experiences. Regular events such as live music, artisan markets, and community workshops contribute to its positioning as a lifestyle hub in eastern Singapore.

== See also ==
- Downtown Container Park, a similar park in Las Vegas.
- Container Park
