= Sunset Station (hotel and casino) =

Casino hotel in Nevada, United States

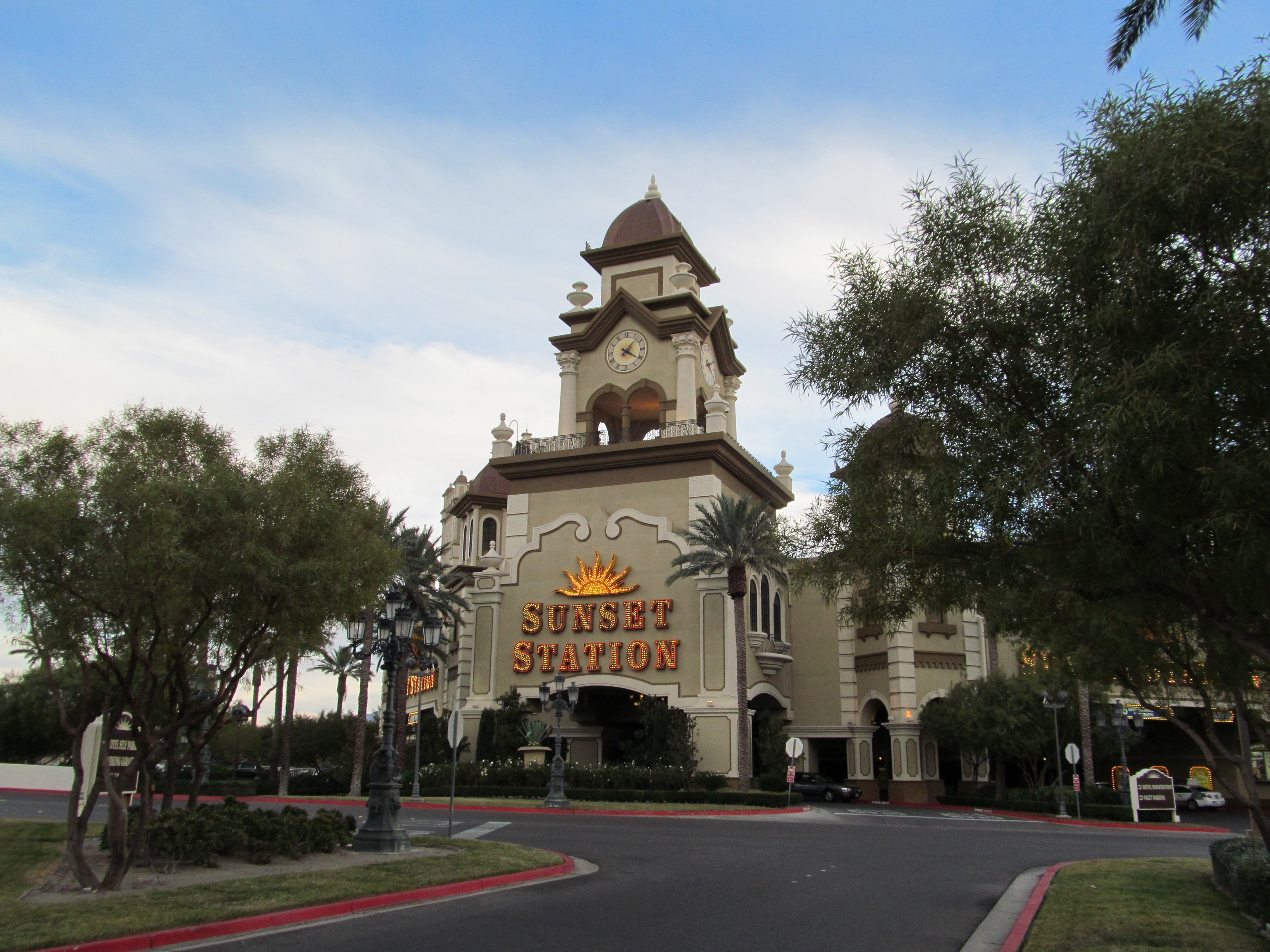
- Sunset Station in 2012
- Interactive map of Sunset Station
- Location: Henderson, Nevada, U.S.; 1301 West Sunset Road; 36°3′39″N 115°2′24″W
- Opened: June 10, 1997; 29 years ago
- Theme: Spanish/Mediterranean
- No. of rooms: 448
- Gaming space: 163,951 sq ft (15,231.5 m^{2})
- Signature attractions: Gaudí Bar; Strike Zone bowling alley Regal Cinemas
- Notable restaurants: The Brass Fork (formerly Grand Café); Feast Buffet (1997–2020); Sonoma Cellar; Hooters (until 2012); Pasta Cucina; Oyster Bar; Yard House
- Casino type: Land-based
- Owner: Station Casinos
- Renovated in: 2016
- Website: sunsetstation.com

Sunset Station is a hotel and locals casino in Henderson, Nevada. It is owned and operated by Station Casinos. It opened on June 10, 1997, as Henderson's first hotel-casino resort. The property features a Spanish/Mediterranean theme. Amenities include a 163,951 sq ft (15,231.5 m^{2}) casino and 448 rooms in a 21-story tower, the city's tallest building. Other features include a movie theater, a 72-lane bowling alley, and various restaurants.

== History ==
Station Casinos announced Sunset Station in February 1994. Groundbreaking was set to begin the following year, but was delayed by Station's purchase of the Texas hotel in North Las Vegas, as well as construction plans for a Kansas City casino. Sunset Station's hotel tower was eventually topped off on February 7, 1997. The resort cost $198 million.

Sunset Station opened on June 10, 1997, as Henderson's first hotel-casino resort. It was also the fourth Las Vegas Valley property opened by Station, as well as the company's most upscale, reflecting a growing trend among locals casinos in Las Vegas. The property was well received upon its opening, leading to an expansion the following year. Station would go on to build other upscale resorts in the Las Vegas Valley, including Green Valley Ranch (2001) and Red Rock Resort (2006).

Sunset Station employed approximately 1,800 people upon opening, and had 1,200 workers as of 2017. Two years later, employees voted in favor of unionizing the property by 83 percent. It would be the fifth Station property in Las Vegas to be unionized, with representation by the Culinary Workers Union.

== Features ==
Sunset Station includes a 163,951 sq ft (15,231.5 m^{2}) casino, as well as 448 rooms in a 21-story tower. Standing 230 feet, it is the tallest building in Henderson. The hotel tower was renovated in 2016. The casino measured 80,000 sq ft (7,400 m^{2}) upon opening, and included 2,800 slot machines, 40 table games, a 208-seat sportsbook, a poker room, and a keno lounge. In late 1998, the casino introduced health-conscious slot machines that incorporated stationary bikes and treadmills.

Sunset Station features a Spanish/Mediterranean theme. The interior was designed by Las Vegas-based Morris & Brown, which referred to architecture in Spanish cities such as Barcelona, Madrid, Segovia, Seville, and Valencia. The work of Spanish architect Antoni Gaudí prompted the Gaudi Bar at Sunset Station. The central feature of the 140-seat bar is a 6,000-square-foot (560 m^{2}) stained glass ceiling composed of thousands of glass pieces and weighing 12 tons. The resort interior also includes sky painted ceilings inspired by The Forum Shops, a mall on the Las Vegas Strip. Exterior facades, resembling Spanish villages, were created by a Hollywood film set designer.

The property opened with various restaurants, including a 760-seat buffet. Gordon Biersch Brewing Company operated a restaurant and 11,000 sq ft (1,000 m^{2}) microbrewery. However, the company ended its lease in March 1998, upon realizing that its premium alcohol did not appeal to the resort's budget-minded clientele. The casino took over the space and reopened it as Sunset Brewing Co.

Upon its opening, Sunset Station included a video game arcade and child-care facility. A 13-screen Act III movie theater opened a year prior to the rest of the resort. The facility has since been taken over by Regal Cinemas. A $45 million resort expansion began in 1998, on the property's south side. The project included construction of a parking garage, additional movie theater screens, new meeting space, and the Sonoma Cellar Steakhouse. More casino space was also added, for a total of 100,000 sq ft (9,300 m^{2}).

Sunset Station's entertainment venues include the 600-seat Club Madrid, and an amphitheater. Notable entertainers have included Foreigner, Gladys Knight, Jamie Foxx, Keith Urban, Merle Haggard, The Monkees, Pat Benatar, Tears for Fears, Toby Keith, Willie Nelson, and ZZ Top.

Strike Zone, a 76,000-square-foot (7,100 m^{2}) bowling alley with 72 lanes, was opened in 2005. Built at a cost of $26 million, it was the most expensive bowling alley in the country. In 2007, the alley hosted the PBA Tour's Motel 6 Classic.

A renovation of the casino floor began in October 2023, and will include a revamped sportsbook featuring a bar and a 150-foot video wall.

== Gallery ==
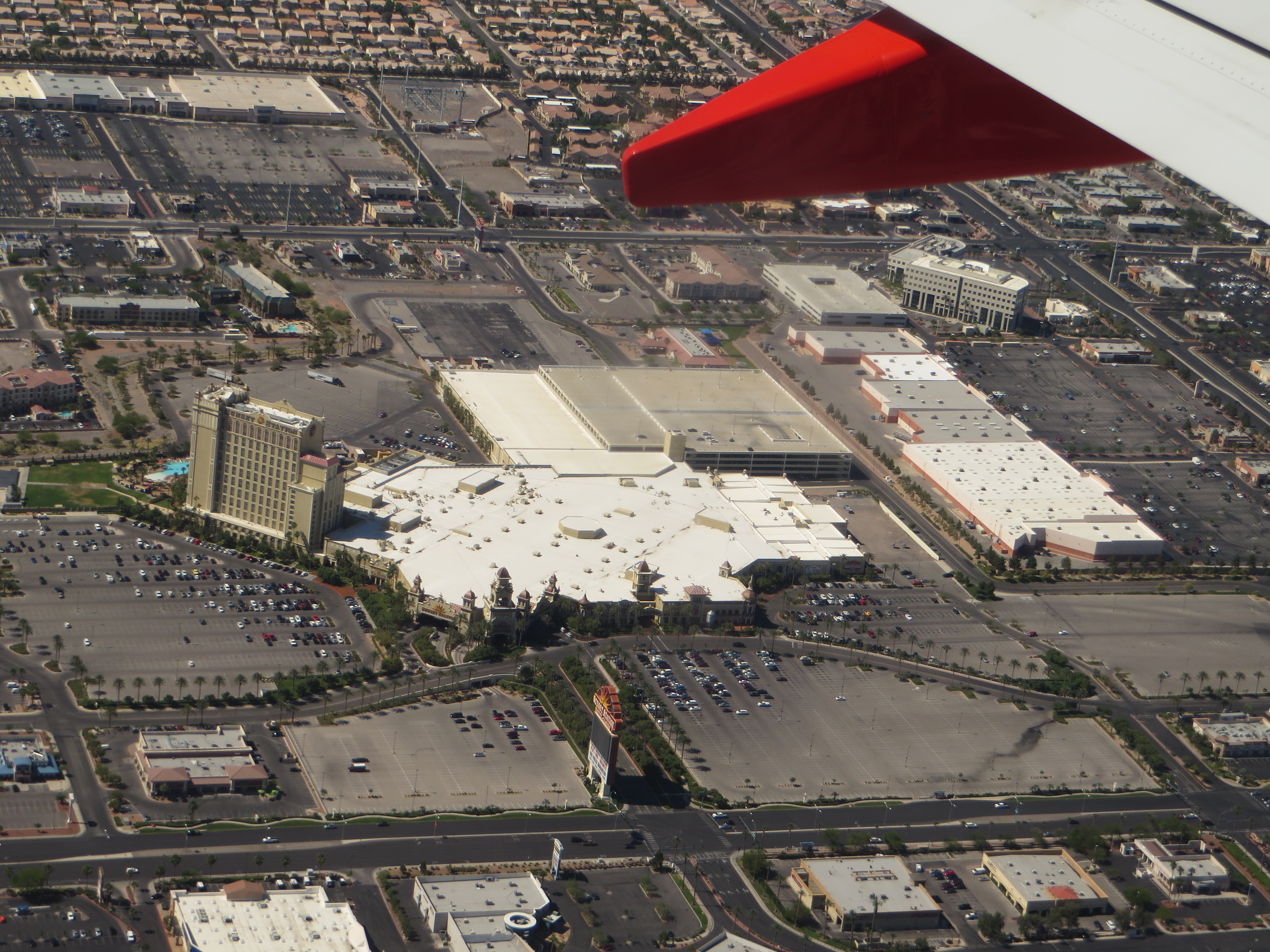
Aerial view of the resort, 2015

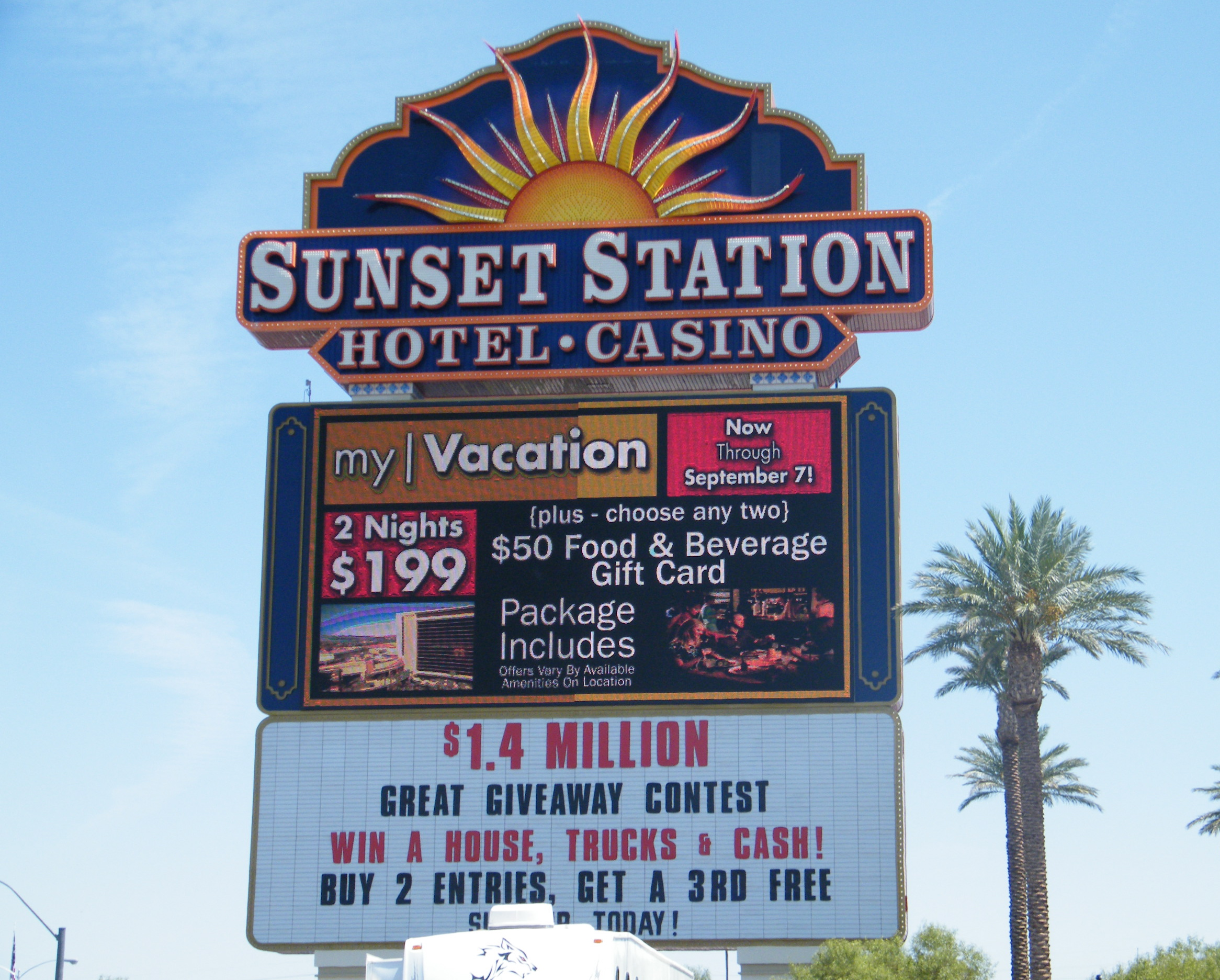
Roadside sign on Sunset Road

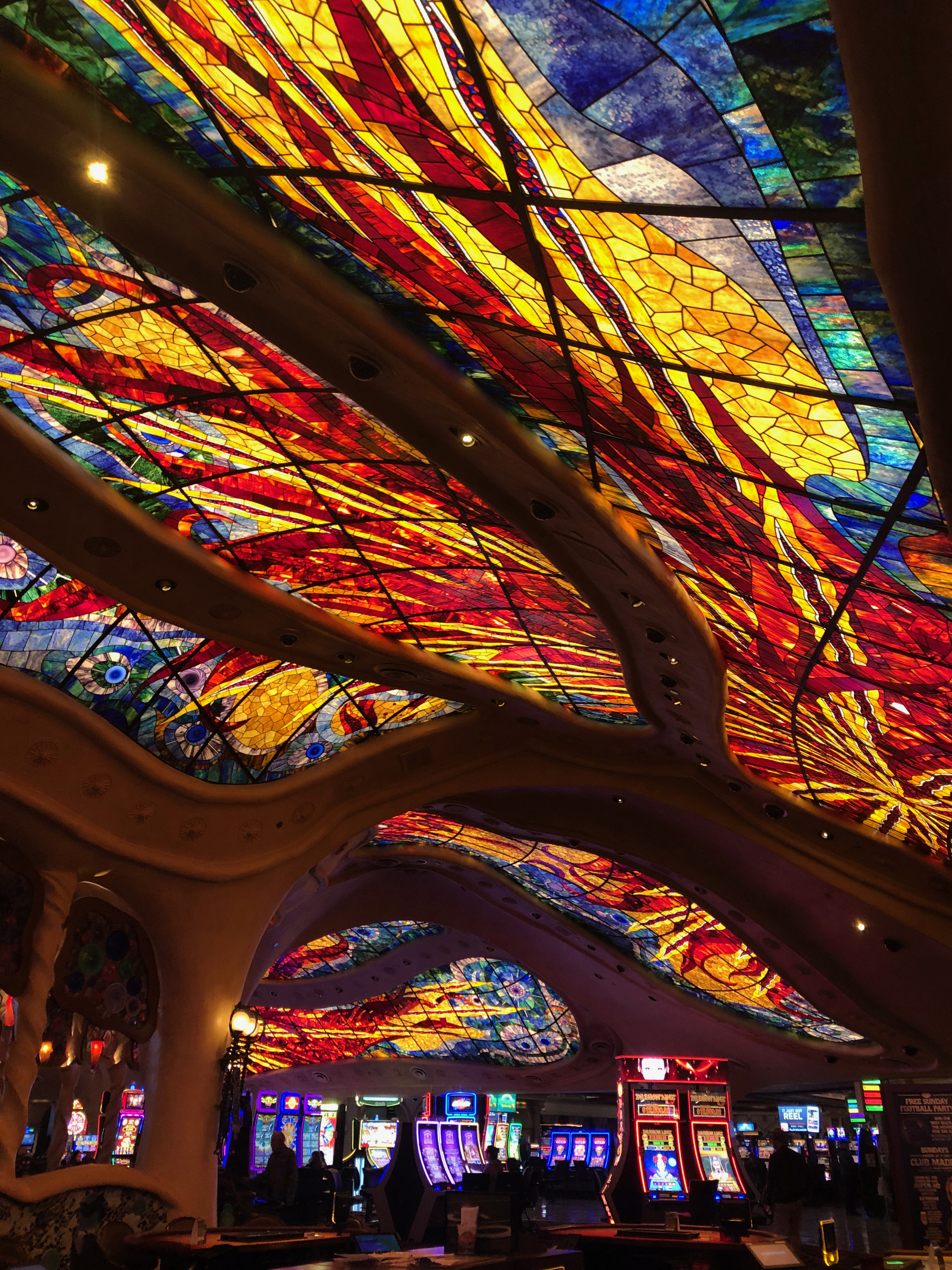
Gaudi Bar
