= Huntridge Theater =

Historic building in Las Vegas, Nevada, US

- U.S. National Register of Historic Places
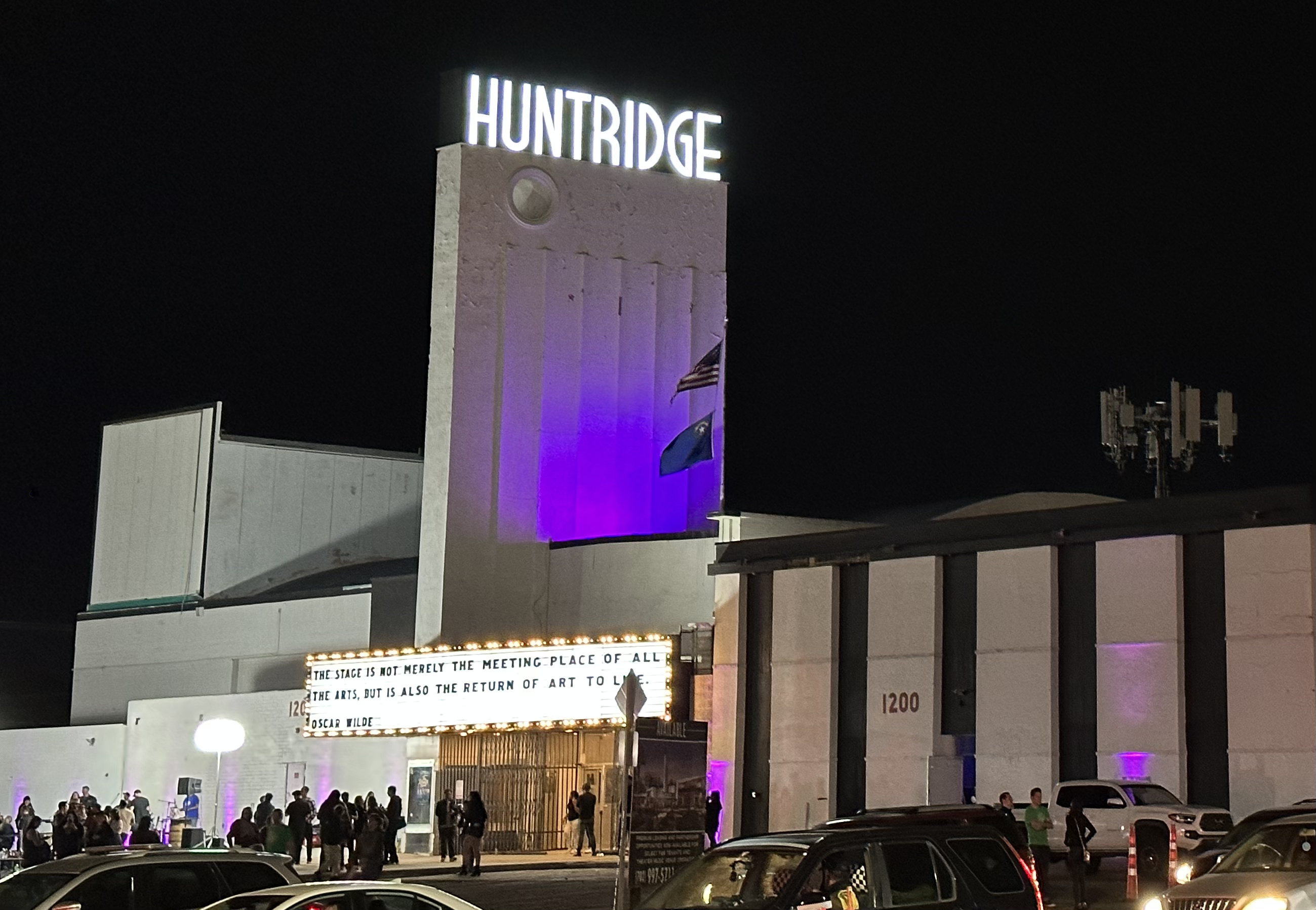
- Huntridge Theater in 2023

- Location within Nevada Location within the United States
- Location: 1208 E. Charleston Blvd. Las Vegas, Nevada
- Coordinates: 36°9′29.21″N 115°8′10.57″W
- Area: 2 acres (0.81 ha)
- Built: 1944
- Built by: Pioneer Construction Co.
- Architect: Lee, S. Charles
- Architectural style: Moderne; International
- Website: www.thehuntridge.com
- NRHP reference No.: 93000686
- Added to NRHP: July 22, 1993

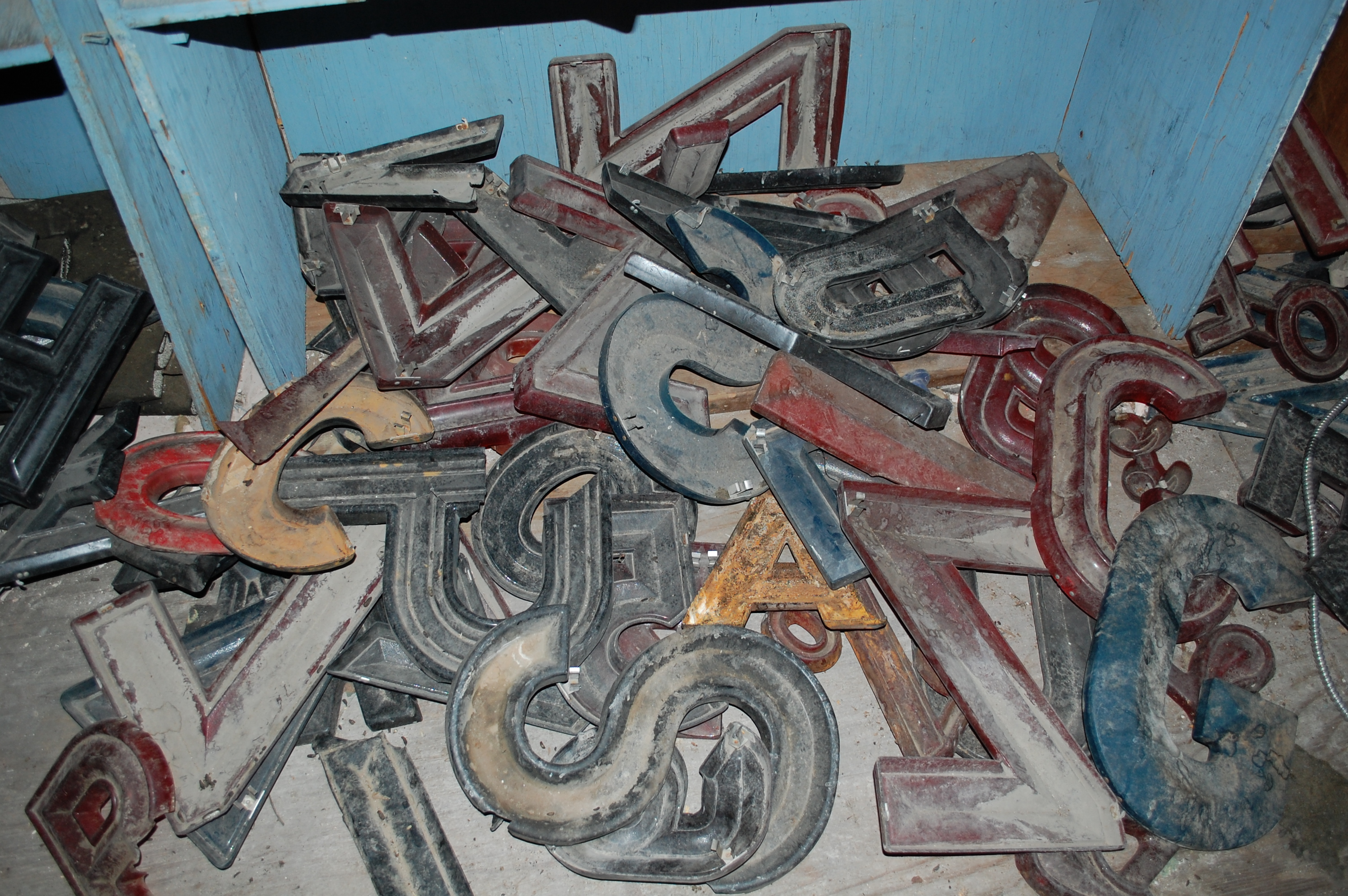
Photos of original marquee letters still stored on site taken July 2020

Huntridge Theater, sometimes known as the Huntridge Performing Arts Theater, is a Streamline Moderne building located in Las Vegas, Nevada, that is listed on the United States National Register of Historic Places. The building was designed by S. Charles Lee.

First opened as a cinema in 1944, the theater also hosted stage performances and was a concert venue throughout its lengthy history. In 2021, the Huntridge was bought after sitting abandoned for almost 17 years. The theater is expected to be fully remodeled and reopened to the public in the near future.

== History ==
Construction began with a ground breaking announcement in the Las Vegas Review-Journal on April 6, 1944. The theater opened on October 10, 1944. with a press release boasting seating for 950, and state of the art projection equipment that is manufactured to 100,000th of an inch tolerance ("eliminating eye strain!"). It was operated by the Commonwealth Theater Company of Las Vegas, and later the Huntridge Theater Company of Las Vegas, headed by Thomas Oakey of Las Vegas. The theater was built on land which had been owned by the international business magnate Leigh S. J. Hunt, before he left it to his son Henry Leigh Hunt in 1933. The Huntridge Theater and the surrounding Huntridge subdivision are named after the Hunt family.

In 1951, Nevada Theater Corp., managed by Lloyd Katz, leased the Huntridge Theater and would de-segregate them in the coming years. Katz is warmly regarded by those growing up in the neighborhood for his 25-cent admission for children during Saturday morning Kiddie Matinee, featuring Disney movies, Roy Rogers westerns, and Looney Tunes animated shorts. In 1963, the Huntridge hosted the world premiere of the film Love Is a Ball.

The theater was purchased by Frank Silvaggio in 1977, and in November 1980 the theater was partitioned into a 2-screen theater. In 1992, Richard Lenz leases the theater, tears down the dividing wall and converts it into a live events hall: Huntridge Performing Arts Theater.

Lenz enlisted the help of preservationist Elizabeth von Till Warren who wrote the application placing the Huntridge theater on the National Register of Historic Places in 1993. Questions raised by Warren during the application process, pertaining the mysterious origin story, the motivations of the developers of such a large theater, designed by a renowned architect, in a pre-Strip Las Vegas with a population of less than 14,000, how such construction could ever have been allowed during the strict wartime rationing of the Office of Price Administration and Emergency Price Control Act of 1942, and also the simultaneous re-naming of the adjoining street to Maryland Parkway, inspired her son Jonathan Warren to publish a complete investigation of theses origins in 2015. Dapper Companies utilized all the Warren research and more in successfully adding the Huntridge Theater to the City of Las Vegas Historic Register on September 1, 2021.

On July 28, 1995, the punk rock group Circle Jerks were to perform at the theater. Several hours before they were to arrive, the roof of the theater collapsed. There were no serious injuries. The lead singer, Keith Morris, later commented, "As soon as we got there, we were told that the roof had collapsed and the show was canceled. We didn't have anywhere else to go, so we just set up our equipment in the parking lot and played for the 30 or 40 people who were still there." The theater was built in 1944, amidst World War II, when steel was in high demand. As such the roof trusses were built with Douglas Fir pine, which baked in the Las Vegas heat for 50 years before ultimately collapsing.

While attempting to save the theater, it was operated by the non-profit Friends of the Huntridge Theatre, Inc., which was dissolved in 2002.

The Huntridge Theater closed on July 31, 2004, almost 60 years after it opened.

The property was controlled by the Mizrachi family of Las Vegas, who owned a furniture store occupying a part of the property which used to house a bank.

In July 2012, a local non-profit organization called The Huntridge Foundation had been working to preserve the architectural integrity, history and culture of the Huntridge Theater and the surrounding community. Among other activities, the foundation conducted oral history interviews of longtime Las Vegans who experienced the theater when it was open, collected theater memorabilia and photographs for an historic archives collection to be donated to the University of Nevada, Las Vegas Libraries Special Collections Department upon completion.

In April 2013, a potential redevelopment project started and the theater received new paint and exterior restoration. However, any future plans after that did not occur.

In 2014, the State of Nevada sued Eli Mizrachi alleging “his group had breached grant provisions by failing to pay for maintenance work and by keeping the theater closed for years.” However, the case was settled in 2016.

On March 31, 2021, the historic theatre was bought by Dapper Companies for $4 million. The founder of Dapper Companies, J Dapper, had been largely improving the surrounding area of the theatre. Dapper had been trying to acquire the Huntridge for almost a decade; but could not due to the legal issues that the Mizrachi family were facing. In a news release, the company stated that the project is to cost around $10 million and plans to finish within three years time.

On Friday, April 7, 2023, Dapper Companies held a public ceremony to relight the theater's deco-styled neon signage, allowing attendees to enter the theater to view a lobby photo exhibit representing some of the history of the theater, as well as enter the main performance space for additional photos and live musical performances. It was also announced that Soho Playhouse would act as the theater's operator and booking agent upon its reopening.

== Popular culture ==
In 2015, a Las Vegas record label emerged with the name Huntridge Records, in order to commemorate the historic theater. The label is based in 11th Street Records, and it has signed one band, named The American Weather.
