= Jillian's =

American restaurant and entertainment chain

JBC Entertainment Holdings, Inc.
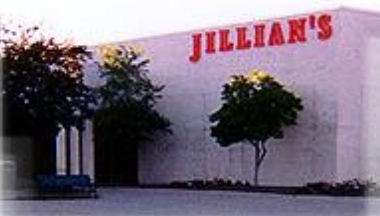
- Jillian's location inside Southern Park Mall
- Trade name: Jillian's
- Formerly: Carom Capital Corporation (1990-1991); Jillian's Entertainment Corporation (1991-1997); Jillian's Entertainment Holdings, Inc. (1997-2009)
- Company type: Private
- Industry: Entertainment/Restaurant
- Founded: 1985
- Founder: Stephen Foster
- Defunct: 2018 (last location in San Francisco, California)
- Fate: Bankruptcy in 2004, closures
- Successor: Dave & Buster’s; Lucky Strike Lanes; Several more
- Headquarters: Reno, Nevada
- Number of locations: 30 (2000); 1 (2018); 0 (2020)
- Area served: United States; Canada (formerly)
- Owner: Gemini Investors
- Website: Archived official website at the Wayback Machine (archive index)

Jillian's was a restaurant and entertainment chain with locations in the United States, headquartered in Reno, Nevada. As of December 2018, all former locations have been closed.

== History ==
Jillian's was founded in 1985 as a billiards club located near Fenway Park in Boston by Stephen Foster. The club was named after Foster's wife, Jillian. The couple later founded the chain Lucky Strike Lanes. Within several years, the owners opened another branch in Seattle.

By the early 1990s, it had become a competitor of Dave & Buster's, expanding its locations to include restaurants, video game arcades, bowling alleys, nightclubs, and conference rooms.

In 1990, they were purchased by Miami-based Metalbanc Corporation via Carom Capital Corporation, only to be renamed to Jillian's Entertainment Corporation a year after.

In 1992, Metalbanc, and its owner Howard Glicken, was indicted by the US government for money laundering and drug distribution tactics as part of the Drug Enforcement Administration's Operation Polar Cap relating to a deal with the Medellín Cartel of Colombia. The charges were later dropped against the company after Glicken struck a deal with the prosecutors that resulted in his business partner, Harry Falk, going to prison for 27 years.

In 1993, Jillian's announced that it had leased sites for new clubs to be located in Illinois, Maryland, and Massachusetts. A billiards club in Pasadena, California, Pasadena Billiards, was purchased. Each new outlet was set up as a separate subsidiary of the company.

During the investigation, Carom placed Jillian's into a new entity in case if they were forced to forfeit the company. After the case was dropped, Jillian's continued with the expansion plans.

In 1997, J.W. Childs Associates and seven shareholders (including the founder) took Jillian's Entertainment Corporation private and renamed it to Jillian's Entertainment Holdings. In 1998, the company moved its corporate headquarters from Boston to Louisville, Kentucky.

In 1999 Jillian's opened its first New York location, in Albany, and additional clubs were soon under construction in the towns of Rochester and Farmingdale.

By 2000, there were roughly 30 locations in the U.S. and one in Montréal, Canada. That same year, Jillian's partnered with Sony in early 2000 to offer HyperBowl, a Sony-developed virtual bowling game, at its locations.

In August 2001, the LA area Jillian's was seen on GSN as Jeffrey Ross hosted in between episode spots for one week during GSN's Let's Make a Deal-a-thon, the week GSN started airing LMAD reruns.

On May 25, 2004, Jillian's Entertainment Holdings, Inc. filed for Chapter 11 bankruptcy and arranged to sell its assets. Nine of the Jillian's locations and the Jillian's tradename were sold to Dave & Buster's. At least some of these locations were eventually converted to operation under the Dave & Buster's name, and some were rebranded as "Dave & Buster's Grand Sports Cafe".

In 2009, D&B, which itself was going through the process of being sold from one venture capital firm to another, sold the rights to the name to Gemini Investors. That company later established JBC Entertainment Holdings, Inc. to operate these locations.

Many of the locations no longer exist: the location at Neonopolis in downtown Las Vegas (which closed in 2008 after also being used as a concert venue) and the location at Peabody Place in Memphis, Tennessee, which shut down in 2009, and the Jillian's of Boardman Township, Ohio at the Southern Park Mall was closed down on January 30, 2011, but for reasons unknown, in the old Woolworth building.

The location in Charlotte, North Carolina closed down in February 2010. The Cleveland Heights, Ohio location also closed on February 20, 2011, and was converted into Myxx, a tapas bar, by its owner.

GameWorks Entertainment acquired the Seattle, San Francisco, and Chesapeake Jillian's locations along with the Jillian's Hi-Life Lanes location in Universal City in October 2011.

All of them later closed between 2014 & 2018, with the Chesapeake Jillian's becoming GameWorks (subsequently closed in 2020) on August 1, 2014, the Universal City location being replaced with Jimmy Buffett's Margaritaville in 2016, & the San Francisco Jillan's becoming Tabletop Tap House (a hipster-styled similar joint).

Around the same time as GameWorks acquired the 4 locations from JBC Entertainment Holdings, the Jillian's Indianapolis location closed after they were evicted by the landlord for not paying rent the year prior & bills in April, with the bowling alley & arcade eventually auctioned off.

In May 2013, the Jillian's Sports Grille location in Peoria, Illinois closed, and was eventually replaced by Marshalls.

In 2017, the Worcester, Massachusetts location closed, and the original Jillian's in Boston was converted into Lucky Strike Social, even though it kept the Jillian's branding.

After the San Francisco Jillian's was converted into Tabletop Tap House in 2018, the Jillian's brand no longer exists.
