= Neonopolis =

Entertainment complex in Las Vegas, Nevada

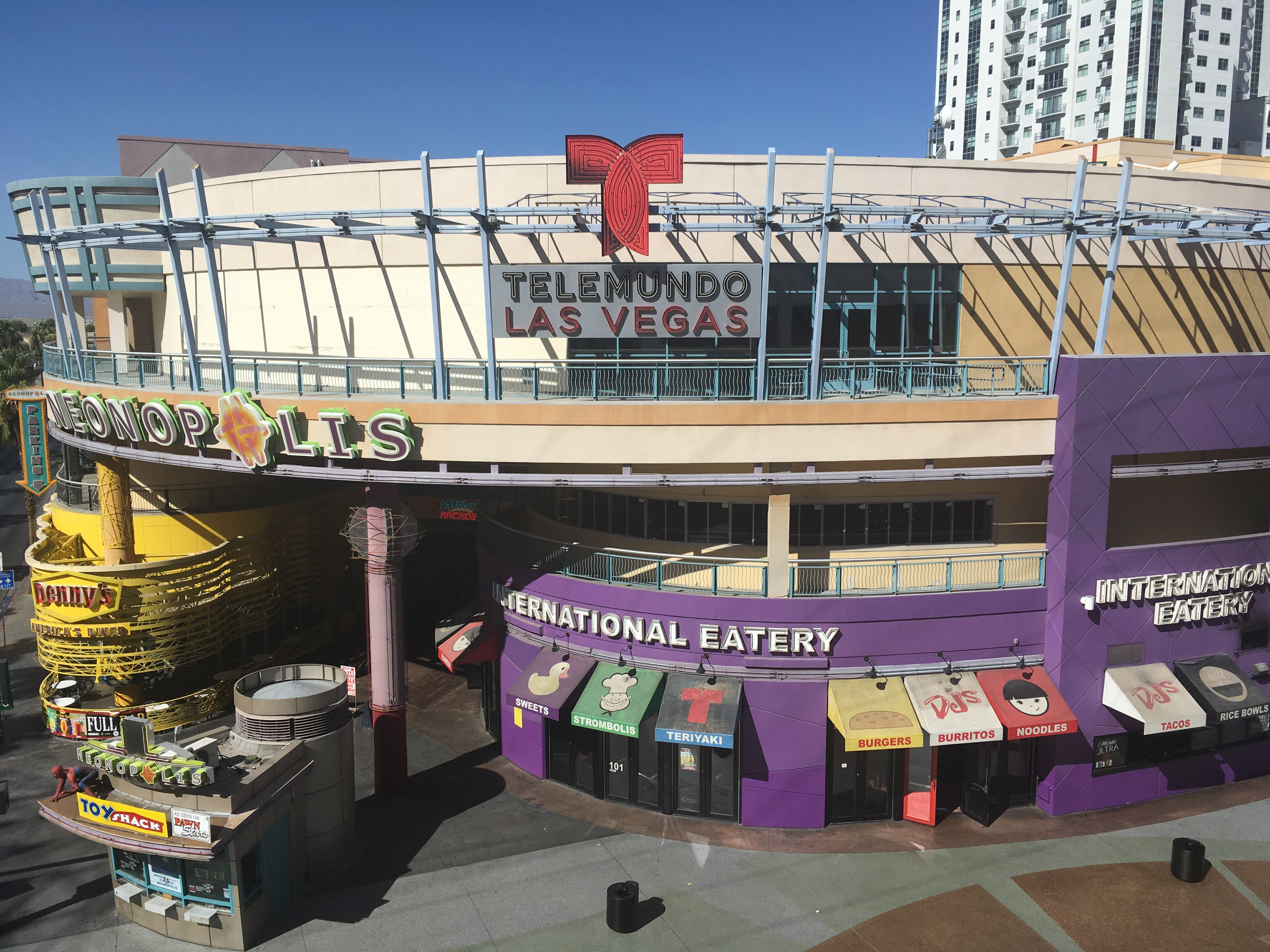
- Side along Fremont Street
- Location: Downtown Las Vegas
- Coordinates: 36.1701°N 115.1409°W
- Address: 450 Fremont Street; Las Vegas, Nevada 89101
- Opened: 2002
- Renovated: 2011
- Developer: Rohit Joshi
- Floor area: 250,000 square feet
- Floors: 3 shopping + 2 parking
- Parking: Underground garage
- Website: www.neonopolislv.com

Neonopolis is a shopping center in Downtown Las Vegas, Nevada. Located on Fremont Street at the corner of Las Vegas Boulevard, the 250,000 sq ft (23,000 m^{2}) complex features a mix of restaurants, entertainment venues, and shops. In keeping with the complex's name, it contains three miles of neon lights.

== History ==
Plans for Neonopolis were announced in December 1997. It opened on May 3, 2002.

In 2006, Prudential Real Estate sold Neonopolis to a development group led by Rohit Joshi for $25 million. Joshi undertook an abortive rebranding of the center as Fremont Square, but ultimately the Neonopolis name was retained. After temporarily closing in 2010 for redevelopment, Neonopolis underwent renovations in 2011 and reopened with new tenants.

== Current tenants ==
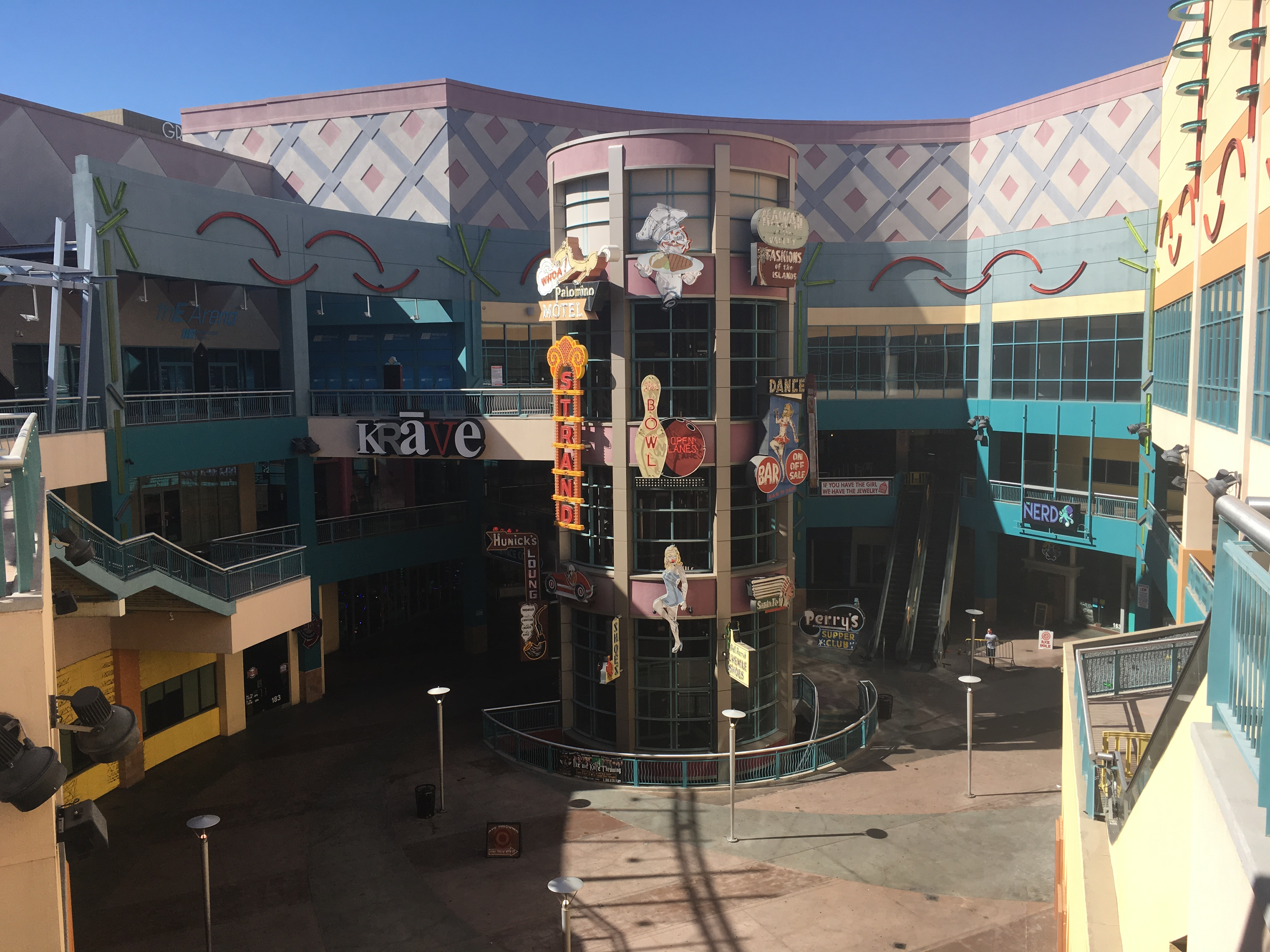
The interior courtyard of the shopping center.

- Axehole ― An axe throwing range, opened in 2017.
- Cat's Meow ― A 10,000-square-foot (930 m^{2}) karaoke club located on the second floor, opened in 2019. It is the second location of a popular, long-established club in New Orleans.
- Denny's ― A 6,400-square-foot (590 m^{2}) flagship location for the diner chain, featuring a wedding chapel. Opened in 2012.
- Dick's Last Resort — A chain restaurant known for its intentionally obnoxious waitstaff. Opened in 2021 in the former Jillian's space.
- Don't Tell Mama ― A piano bar located on the mall's ground floor. It moved to Neonopolis in 2019 from its previous location on Fremont East.
- Fat Tuesday ― A frozen daiquiri shop, opened in 2020.
- Fremont Watches -- A shop that repairs and sells used watches.
- Gene Woods Racing Experience ― An indoor go-kart track, opened in 2019.
- Heart Attack Grill ― A hamburger restaurant, known for its medical theme and for offering the world's highest-calorie burger, opened in 2011.
- Hush Puppy ― A restaurant known for southern "comfort food", announced in 2024 for a 2025 opening.
- International Eatery ― A food court with three outlets, opened in 2013 in the ground-floor former Luna Rossa Ristorante space, by HIG Management, a major operator of mall eateries.
- Little Neon Wedding Chapel ― A wedding chapel opened in 2016.
- The Nerd ― A nightclub and bowling alley themed around comic books and video games, opened in 2017 in the second-floor former Drink & Drag space.
- Notoriety ― An entertainment venue and lounge, with several rooms hosting concerts, comedy nights, and other events. Opened in 2019, in the former movie theater space on the third floor.
- Substance — a warehouse-themed nightclub opening in July 2024.
- Toy Shack ― A seller of vintage collectible toys. It moved to the shopping center in 2011 to capitalize on visitors familiar with its owner's frequent appearances on the television series Pawn Stars.
- Ultimate Sports Cards & Memorabilia ― A sports memorabilia shop, which moved to Neonopolis in 2012, like the Toy Shack, because of its owner's appearances on Pawn Stars.

== Previous tenants ==
- Banger Brewing ― A 3,000-square-foot (280 m^{2}) pub and microbrewery, opened in 2013 on the ground floor. Closed in 2023.
- Cannabition ― A marijuana-themed museum, opened in 2018. Among the exhibits was Bongzilla, billed as the world's largest bong. Closed in 2019.
- Del Prado Jewelers ― A jewelry store that moved to the second floor of Neonopolis in 2006. Closed in 2021.
- Drink and Drag ― A bowling alley and drag club, opened in 2012. Closed in 2013 because of legal and financial issues.
- Evapor8 ― An e-cigarette shop, opened in 2013.
- Fremont Arcade ― A video arcade, opened in 2016 on the ground floor.
- Galaxy Theatres ― An 11-screen movie theater. Opened in 2002 as Crown Theatres, the center's original anchor tenant, with 14 screens. Later reduced to 11 screens, and then taken over by Galaxy in 2006. Closed in 2009.
- House of Selfies ― An "Instagram museum", opened in 2019.
- Jillian's ― A two-story restaurant, bar, and entertainment complex. Opened in 2002 as one of the complex's anchor tenants. Closed in 2008.
- Krave Massive ― A gay nightclub, sister property of Drink and Drag, moved to the former Galaxy movie theater space from its previous location on the Las Vegas Strip in June 2013. It was planned to be the largest gay club in the world, but never fully opened. Closed after several months because of a tax dispute.
- Las Vegas Rocks Cafe ― A restaurant and lounge themed around the history of Las Vegas. Opened in 2009 in the former Jillian's space. Closed in 2011.
- Metropolitan Gallery of Las Vegas ― An art museum and gallery. Previously named the Southern Nevada Museum of Fine Art, it moved to Neonopolis in 2008. The name was changed in 2017.
- Millennial Esports ― A 15,000-square-foot (1,400 m^{2}) venue for competitive video gaming, opened in 2017 on the third floor.
- Poker Dome ― A studio for nationally televised poker events. Opened in 2006 on the third floor, in space previously occupied by three of the movie theaters. Closed in 2007.
- Southern Nevada Center for the Arts ― An arts center providing studio and gallery space for local artists. Opened in 2009 and closed later that year.
- Telemundo ― KBLR, the Las Vegas affiliate of the Spanish-language television network, moved its studios to a 17,500-square-foot (1,630 m^{2}) space on the third floor in 2009.
