= Live 1981 & 1986 =

Album by Adolescents

Live album by the Adolescents
- Released: 1989
- Genre: Hardcore punk, punk rock
- Length: 35:02 (LP); 44:07 (cassette, CD)
- Label: Triple X (51015)

Adolescents chronology
Balboa Fun*Zone (1988)	Live 1981 & 1986 (1989)	Return to the Black Hole (1997)

Live 1981 & 1986 is a live album by the American punk rock band the Adolescents, released in 1989 on Triple X Records. It consists of live performances recorded during the band's original 1980–81 run and during their 1986 reunion.

== Background and recording ==
The Adolescents had broken up in April 1989, after releasing their 1988 album Balboa Fun*Zone through Triple X Records. Live 1981 & 1986 was released later in 1989 by Triple X, consisting of previously recorded live material mastered by Eddie Schreyer at Capitol Studios. The album's liner notes, written by singer Tony Brandenburg (here using the stage name Tony Montana) in May 1989, give a history of the band including several personal stories.

The album does not state when or where the recorded performances occurred, nor which tracks are from which set of shows. Brandenburg's notes dedicate the album to, among others, "Rob Ritter (who recorded the Starwood show) ... and the guys in Connecticut and San Diego who taped the shows. I'm sorry, I forgot your names." The Starwood was a venue in West Hollywood, California that operated from 1973 to June 1981. The liner notes include six fliers for Adolescents shows in the Greater Los Angeles Area, but do not state if the recordings on the album come from any of these shows: February 6, 1981 at the Oxnard Community Center with Rich Kids on LSD, Scared Straight, Sikki Velvet, and Apocalypse; March 24, 1981 at the Starwood with Eddie and the Subtitles and 45 Grave; May 13, 1981 at the Whisky a Go Go in West Hollywood with the Ozie-Hares; July 4, 1981 at Perkins Palace in Pasadena with Stiff Little Fingers and D.O.A.; and May 30, 1986 at Fender's Ballroom in Long Beach (two fliers are pictured, one advertising the supporting acts as the Weirdos, the Blackjax, and Subterfuge; the other listing the Weirdos, the Blackjax, the Hickoids, and Nomeansno).

The album credits the performers as Tony Montana, Steve Soto, Casey Royer, and brothers Rikk, Frank, and Alfie Agnew. Montana, Soto, and Frank Agnew had founded the Adolescents in January 1980. Rikk Agnew and Royer had joined the band that June, and this lineup had recorded the group's debut album, Adolescents, also known as The Blue Album. Rikk Agnew left the band a few months after the album's April 1981 release, quitting mid-performance during a show at the Starwood. He was replaced by former Germs guitarist Pat Smear, who left the band that June and was replaced by Steve Roberts. This lineup recorded the Welcome to Reality EP, but the Adolescents broke up in August 1981, never having performed outside of California. The Blue Album lineup reunited for a show in April 1986 at Fender's Ballroom that led to the band re-forming, but Frank Agnew left the group after a few months and was replaced by his younger brother Alfie, then Royer left that August and was replaced by Sandy Hanson, formerly of the Mechanics.

== Release and reception ==
Live 1981 & 1986 was released by Triple X Records in 1989 in LP, cassette, and compact disc formats. The cassette and CD versions include five additional tracks, with the last three labeled as "bonus tracks". In a retrospective review, Ned Raggett of AllMusic gave the album 3 stars out of 5, stating "the Adolescents rip through things with energy and attitude to burn, and come out winners each time. Fidelity isn't always the best, but it's much better than many tapes out there, with more emphasis on the treble than anything (though Soto's underrated bass-playing abilities come out more clearly here than on the original album, actually!). [...] The versions of the three songs from the Welcome to Reality EP sound much more fun than the studio takes, so losing Rikk Agnew before the recording of that release really did have an effect."

== Track listing ==
Writing credits adapted from the album's liner notes.

Side one
No.	Title	Writer(s)	Length
1.	"Amoeba"	Rikk Agnew, Casey Royer	2:56
2.	"Who Is Who"	Tony Montana, Steve Soto, Frank Agnew	1:16
3.	"No Friends"	Montana, Soto	2:10
4.	"Welcome to Reality"	Montana, Soto, F. Agnew	2:07
5.	"Self Destruct"	Montana, Soto	0:48
6.	"Things Start Moving"	Montana, F. Agnew, Steve Roberts	2:49
7.	"Word Attack"	Montana, R. Agnew	1:02
8.	"Losing Battle"	Montana, Soto, F. Agnew	1:36
9.	"I Got a Right" (originally performed by the Stooges)	Iggy Pop, James Williamson	3:15

Side two
No.	Title	Writer(s)	Length
10.	"No Way"	R. Agnew	2:17
11.	"The Liar"	Montana, Soto	1:58
12.	"Rip It Up"	Montana, R. Agnew	2:20
13.	"L.A. Girl"	Montana, F. Agnew	1:28
14.	"Wrecking Crew"	Montana, Soto	2:06
15.	"Creatures"	R. Agnew	1:52
16.	"Kids of the Black Hole"	R. Agnew	5:02
Total length:			35:02

Additional tracks on cassette and CD releases
No.	Title	Writer(s)	Length
17.	"Peasant Song"	Montana, R. Agnew, F. Agnew	2:41
18.	"Do the Eddie"	Montana, F. Agnew	0:47
19.	"The Liar"	Montana, Soto	2:11
20.	"Who Is Who"	Montana, Soto, F. Agnew	1:25
21.	"Wrecking Crew"	Montana, Soto	2:01
Total length:			44:07

== Personnel ==
Credits adapted from the album's liner notes.

Band

- Tony Montana – lead vocals
- Rikk Agnew – guitar, backing vocals
- Frank Agnew – guitar, backing vocals
- Alfie Agnew – guitar, backing vocals
- Steve Soto – bass guitar, backing vocals
- Casey Royer – drums, backing vocals

Production

- Eddie Schreyer – audio mastering

Artwork

- Donna Trujillo – art direction
- Steve Martinez – art direction
- Chris Fuhrer –photographs
