= Caseyology =

Studio album by D.I.
- Released: May 21, 2002
- Genre: Punk rock
- Label: Cleopatra Records

D.I. chronology
State of Shock (1994)	Caseyology (2002)	On the Western Front (2007)

Professional ratings
Review scores
Source	Rating
Allmusic	1.5/5 stars

Caseyology is the sixth, fifth full-length, studio album by American punk rock band D.I., released in 2002 on Cleopatra Records. The title refers to the singer's his first name (Casey) and the word "ology" may be a reference to the word anthology. Despite the title, it's technically not a compilation album, but it does feature re-recordings and live versions of selected songs from the band's previous releases.

Much confusion has sprung up about the Caseyology album. It wasn't listed on their, and the music press often referred to 2007's On the Western Front as the group's first release since State of Shock in 1994. Some sources list it as a compilation album.

== Track listing ==
1. "Persecution for Profit" (3:18)
2. "Stick to Your Guns" (2:15)
3. "Anthony the Psycho" (2:09)
4. "Richard Hung Himself" (3:30)
5. "Black Surf" (3:01)
6. "She Don't Like Me" (4:47)
7. "Anxiety Attack" (2:55)
8. "Ride the Toxic Surf" (2:58)
9. "Perfect Girl" (2:39)
10. "Johnny's Got a Problem" (2:10)
11. "Tragedy" (live) (2:44)
12. "No Way" (live) (1:52)
13. "Euthanasia" (live) (2:09)
14. "Guns" (live) (2:27)
15. "Pervert Nurse" (live) (3:04)
- "Richard Hung Himself" is a re-recording of the song from their 1983 EP Team Goon, while "Stick to Your Guns" and "Johnny's Got a Problem" are re-recordings of songs from their 1986 album Horse Bites Dog Cries.
- The last five tracks were recorded at Korn Beach, California.
