= Steve Soto =

American musician

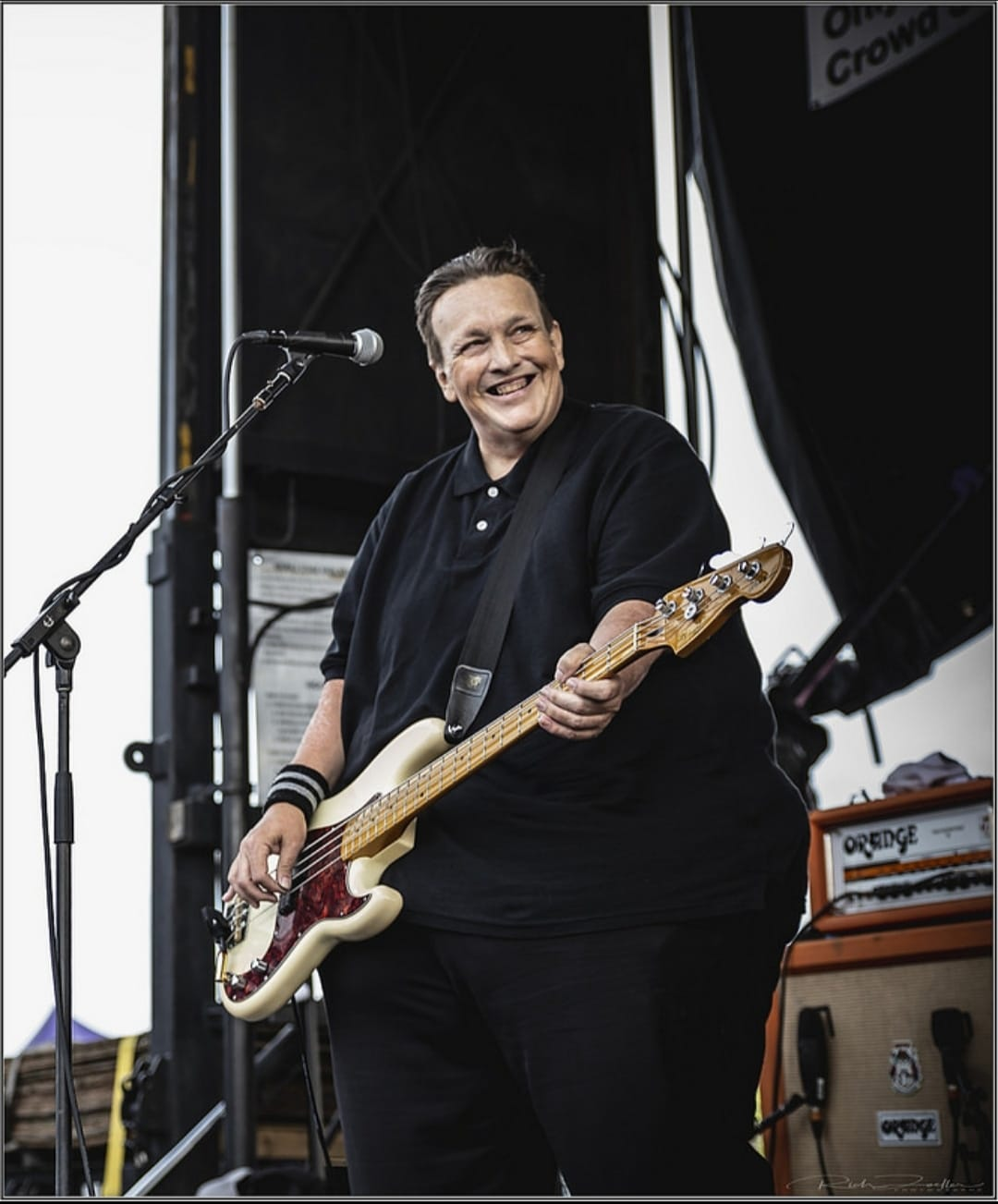
- Steve Soto Steve Soto performing in 2017 at the Vans Warped Tour in Wantagh, N.Y.

Background information
- Born: August 23, 1963
- Died: June 27, 2018 (aged 54)
- Genres: Punk rock; hardcore punk; skate punk; pop punk
- Occupation: Musician
- Instruments: Guitar; bass; vocals
- Years active: 1978–2018
- Labels: Frontier Records; Triple X Records; S.O.S. Records

Steve Soto (August 23, 1963 – June 27, 2018) was an American musician. Soto was the founding bassist of California punk rock bands Agent Orange and the Adolescents. Soto was also a member of Legal Weapon, Joyride, Manic Hispanic, Punk Rock Karaoke, and the punk supergroup 22 Jacks. Soto also fronted his own band, Steve Soto and the Twisted Hearts, starting in 2008.

Shortly after leaving Agent Orange, Soto cofounded the Adolescents with vocalist Tony Reflex in 1980, which became his primary band for most of his career. Following the Adolescents' first breakup in 1981, Soto played in Legal Weapon before the Adolescents' reformation in 1986. Following their second breakup in 1989, Soto played in Joyride, Manic Hispanic and 22 Jacks before the Adolescents reformed again in 2001. Side projects he played in since their second reformation included Steve Soto and the Twisted Hearts, Black Diamond Riders, and Punk Rock Karaoke.

Soto played on each of the Adolescents' first nine albums. Until his death in 2018, Soto and Reflex anchored the band's lineup.

== Career ==
=== Agent Orange (1979) ===
Soto was a founding member of the Placentia, California punk band in 1979. Soto attended El Dorado High School in Placentia, California.

Agent Orange was one of the first bands to mix punk rock with surf music.

In 1979, in order for Agent Orange to get signed to Posh Boy records, they recorded three tracks with Soto on bass. Those song tracks were 'Bored of You', 'America', and 'El Dorado'.

Soto would end up leaving Agent Orange in late 1979 to form ‘The Adolescents’.

(Bored of You, El Dorado and America would eventually be released later on following Steve's departure from the band. Included as bonus tracks for the Living in Darkness Remaster and Remix, which came out in 1992)

=== Adolescents (1980–81, 1986–89, 2001–2018) ===
Adolescents were formed in Fullerton, California, in 1980 and were one of the main punk acts to emerge from Orange County, along with their peers in Agent Orange and Social Distortion. The band's debut album, 1981's Adolescents (also known as the blue album) was one of the first hardcore punk records to be widely distributed throughout the United States, and became one of the best-selling California hardcore albums behind the Dead Kennedys' 1980 album, Fresh Fruit for Rotting Vegetables, selling over 10,000 copies. Following the release of their 1981 E.P. Welcome to Reality the band broke up. In 1986, the original Adolescents line-up reunited to perform a concert at Fenders Ballroom in Long Beach, California. The Concert was a major success with fans and critics alike, which lead to the reformation of the original group. Line-up changes including lead singer Tony Brandenburg leaving to join the Flower Leperds (A.K.A. Tony Cadena, Tony Reflex) caused Rikk Agnew to share vocal duties with Soto. In 1988 Soto was the main vocalist in the band. In 1989 The Adolescents broke up for a second time. In 2001, the blue album lineup of Adolescents reformed to perform at a birthday party for singer Tony Reflex's wife and over the next few years the band played sporadically. Encouraged by the response to their reunion shows, Reflex suggested that the band start writing new material. The Adolescents issued an EP titled Unwrap and Blow Me! in 2003, limited to 100 copies and consisting of six new songs. The band performed a show on October 3, 2003, at the House of Blues at Downtown Disney, which was filmed and recorded for Kung Fu Records' live series The Show Must Go Off!. The resulting live album and DVD, titled Live at the House of Blues, was released February 24, 2004. The following year the band released The Complete Demos 1980–1986 which collected all the demo recordings from the Adolescents' early years. Following the departure of Rikk Agnew, The Adolescents decided to continue as a quartet, re-recording the new songs they had done with Rikk and recording several more for their 2005 comeback album, OC Confidential, which ultimately took over two years to complete. Founding guitarist Frank Agnew left the band in 2006 leaving Soto and Reflex as the band's sole constant members and primary songwriters from this point forward. A split EP with the band Burning Heads was released in 2009 and in 2011 the band released the studio album The Fastest Kid Alive. In 2012, and the Adolescents released the American Dogs in Europe EP in conjunction with a European tour. Soto would release four more albums with the band including Presumed Insolent in 2013, La Vendetta... in 2014, Manifest Density in 2016 and the band's ninth album, Cropduster was released on July 20, 2018, a month after his death. Leftöver Crack's Brad Logan would replace Soto following his death with the band releasing their first album without him, Russian Spider Dump, on October 23, 2020.

=== Legal Weapon (1981–1982) ===
When The Adolescents broke up in 1981, Soto, together with Frank Agnew, joined the Los Angeles-based band Legal Weapon, performing on bass guitar from 1981–1982. Soto appeared on one album with Legal Weapon, 1982's Death of Innocence

=== Joyride (1989–1994) ===
Following the 1989 breakup of Adolescents, Soto went on to form the band Joyride with former Adolescent drummer Sandy Hanson. They released two albums, Johnny Bravo (1992) and Another Month of Mondays (1994), both on Dr. Dream records.

=== Manic Hispanic (1992–2017) ===
Manic Hispanic was formed in 1992 with Mike "Gabby" Gaborno and other members of the Cadillac Tramps and the Grabbers. The band has released five records on BYO Records, The Menudo Incident(1994), The Recline of Mexican Civilization (1998), Mijo goes to Jr. College (2002) Grupo Sexo (2005), and Back in Brown(posthumously, 2021).

=== 22 Jacks (1995–2018) ===
In 1995 Soto started the punk rock supergroup 22 Jacks consisting of members of Wax, The Breeders, and Royal Crown Revue. The band toured extensively and released three records, Uncle Bob(1997), Overserved (1999) and Going North (2001) on the SideOneDummy label.

=== Steve Soto and the Twisted Hearts (2008–2018) ===
Soto fronted the band Steve Soto and the Twisted Hearts with James Achor, Mike Duffy, Veikko Lepisto, and Mike Bolger and performed solo as a singer/songwriter. Soto released two records with the Twisted Hearts; An Exercise In Blue (2008) and West Coast Bound (2009).

=== Black Diamond Riders (2009–2018) ===
In late 2009/ early 2010 Soto helped form the Black Diamond Riders; and band of Punk Rockers masterfully playing 60s Soul along with Jonny “2 Bags” Wickersham from Social Distortion, bassist Warren Renfro from Cadillac Tramps and Manic Hispanic, drummer Jamie Reidling from U.S. Bombs and Die Hunns, saxophonist Vince Hizon, trumpet player Joseph Badaczewski and keyboardist Greg Kuehn from TSOL.

== Other projects ==
In 2001 Soto joined Punk Rock Karaoke with Eric Melvin (NOFX) Greg Hetson (Bad Religion/Circle Jerks) and Darrin Pfeiffer (Goldfinger); they played "punk classics" live, letting members of the audience sing along.

Soto performed regularly on guitar and bass guitar, as well as adding vocal harmonies on many musical acts such as Jack Grisham's group the Manic Low as well as guitar and backing vocals on CJ Ramone's album American Beauty as well as touring and performing on guitar.

Soto was part of a group known as Plan B alongside Nick Oliveri, Troy Van Leeuwen, and Joey Castillo.

Soto was part of a new wave tribute band known as Flock of GooGoo with Gabby Gaborno (Manic Hispanic)

== Personal life and death ==
Soto's family is originally from Mexico. Soto died peacefully in his sleep on June 27, 2018, at the age of 54 of natural causes.

== Discography ==
Adolescents

- Adolescents (1981)
- Welcome to Reality EP (1981)
- Brats in Battalions (1987)
- Balboa Fun*Zone (1988)
- Live 1981 & 1986 (1989)
- Return to the Black Hole (1997)
- Unwrap and Blow Me! EP (2003)
- Live at the House of Blues (2004)
- The Complete Demos 1980–1986 (2005)
- OC Confidential (2005)
- Burning Heads / Adolescents EP (2009)
- The Fastest Kid Alive (2011)
- American Dogs in Europe EP (2012)
- Adolescents / Muletrain EP (2012)
- Presumed Insolent (2013)
- La Vendetta... (2014)
- Hot War EP (2015)
- Manifest Density (2016)
- Cropduster (2018)

Legal Weapon

- Death of Innocence (1982)

Joyride

- Johnny Bravo (1992)
- Another Month of Mondays (1994)

Manic Hispanic

- The Menudo Incident (1994)
- The Recline of Mexican Civilization (1998)
- Mijo goes to Jr. College (2002)
- Grupo Sexo (2005)
- Back in Brown (2021)

22 Jacks

- Uncle Bob (1997)
- Overserved (1999)
- Going North (2001)

Steve Soto and the Twisted Hearts

- An Exercise in Blue (2008)
- West Coast Bound (2009)
