= Professor and the Madman (band) =

American rock band

- Origin: Fullerton, California, U.S.
- Genres: Rock music; indie rock; alternative rock; punk rock; pop-punk
- Years active: 2016–present
- Label: Fullertone Records
- Members: Alfie Agnew; Sean Elliott; Rat Scabies; Paul Gray
- Website: professorandthemadman.com

Professor and the Madman is a four-piece American rock band featuring co-frontmen/songwriters Alfie Agnew and Sean Elliott, drummer Rat Scabies and bassist Paul Gray. Agnew had been in the punk bands Adolescents and D.I. and Elliott had played guitar in D.I. Scabies and Gray were the rhythm section of The Damned, and they appeared together on a pair of The Damned's studio albums: The Black Album (1980) and Strawberries (1982). Gray also played in Eddie and the Hot Rods and UFO.

After playing in punk bands as an adolescent, Agnew left the scene for college at 18, and got out of music in the early '90s while going to graduate school. He is currently a math professor at CSU Fullerton. In 2015, his ex-bandmate, Sean Elliott, got in touch with him about playing music together again. Having reunited, they began collaborating on original music as Professor and the Madman. The band's name is a nod to Agnew's professorial career, while also a reference to the book The Professor and the Madman: A Tale of Murder, Insanity, and the Making of the Oxford English Dictionary by Simon Winchester.

In 2015, Elliott contacted Agnew to play a reunion show with The Critens for a private Christmas party in Costa Mesa, California. At this gig, they met Scabies, who sat in with them for an encore of The Damned song "Smash It Up" – both Agnew and Elliott were fans of The Damned's The Black Album. They quickly invited Scabies back to Agnew's home studio to collaborate on an early Professor and the Madman song. Pleased with the results, they invited him to be a permanent addition to the band and Scabies has played on all five Professor and the Madman albums. As a trio, they recorded the first two albums, 2016's Elixir 1: Good Evening, Sir! and Elixir 2: Election.

After that, they brought Gray into the project. In December 2016, Elliott reached out to him on Facebook, sent him some music, and Gray joined the band.

Co-produced by the band and David M. Allen (The Cure, The Damned, The Sisters of Mercy), the Disintegrate Me album was released February 23, 2018 on the band's own Fullertone Records. Agnew and Elliott wrote the music and lyrics and took turns singing lead.

The video for the track "Space Walrus" premiered on Alternative Press on January 17, 2018.

Agnew, Elliott, Gray and Scabies made their live concert debut as Professor and the Madman at London's 100 Club on August 10, 2018. This resulted in the live album, Live at the 100 Club, released by Fullertone Records on January 29, 2019. Due to the fact that Agnew and Elliott reside in Southern California, and Gray and Scabies in the UK, scheduling concerts for the recording quartet has proved challenging. As a result, Agnew and Elliott have occasionally performed in the Los Angeles area with guest musicians Frank Agnew (Adolescents, T.S.O.L., 45 Grave), Mark Tolbert (Doggy Style, Crash Kills Four), and local drummer Nick Scalzo.

The band's fifth album, Séance, released on November 13, 2020 on Fullertone Records, is a concept album revolving around a group of friends who hold a séance to say goodbye to their loved ones. As with Disintegrate Me, the album was recorded remotely with Agnew and Elliott sending sound files from California to Scabies and Gray in the U.K. to record the drums and bass.

== Discography ==
=== Studio albums ===
Title	Release date
Elixir 1: Good Evening, Sir!	2016
Elixir 2: Election	2016
Disintegrate Me	February 23, 2018
Séance	November 13, 2020

=== Live albums ===
Title
Live at the 100 Club
Release date

January 29, 2019
