= All by Myself (Rikk Agnew album) =

Studio album by Rikk Agnew
- Released: October 1982
- Studio: Perspective Sound
- Genre: Punk rock
- Length: 36:02
- Label: Frontier
- Producers: Rikk Agnew; Thom Wilson

Rikk Agnew chronology
All by Myself (1982)	Emotional Vomit (1990)

Professional ratings
Review scores
Source	Rating
AllMusic	3.5/5 stars

All by Myself is the debut solo studio album by the American multi-instrumentalist Rikk Agnew. It was originally released in October 1982, on the label Frontier. It was produced by Agnew, and co-produced by the then-Adolescents producer Thom Wilson. Agnew played all the instruments on the album. The band D.I., which Agnew joined in 1983, included cover versions of the songs "O.C. Life", and "Falling Out" from this album for their debut album, Ancient Artifacts, which was released in 1985.

== Critical reception ==
In a retrospective review for AllMusic, critic Ned Raggett gave the album three and a half out of five stars and wrote that "Possessed of a good mid-range punk voice – no sneering or bellowing, not really singing but not just talking over the songs either – he creates the same basic rush he brought to his early stints in the Adolescents and the faster Christian Death songs he [had] worked on, but with a slightly poppier bent at points that perfectly balances sass and strength, while not being afraid to experiment from time to time either".

== Track listing ==
All tracks are written by Rikk Agnew, except where noted.

Side one
No.	Title	Writer(s)	Length
1.	"O.C. Life"		2:50
2.	"10"		2:58
3.	"Yur 2 Late"		3:40
4.	"Everyday"	Frank Agnew; Rikk Agnew	4:30
5.	"One Shot"		3:07

Side two
No.	Title	Length
6.	"Falling Out"	2:52
7.	"Surfside"	4:05
8.	"It's Doing Something"	3:08
9.	"Fast"	1:26
10.	"Section 8"	7:26
Total length:		36:02

== Personnel ==
Credits are adapted from the album's liner notes.

- Rikk Agnew – lead and background vocals; lead, rhythm, and bass guitars; drums; ARP Solina String Ensemble SE-IV

Production team

- Thom Wilson – producer; engineer; mixer
- Rikk Agnew – producer
- Linda Taylor – insert and T-shirt artwork
- Glen Friedmann – front cover photography
- Ed Colver – back cover photography
