= Life Sentence to Love =

Studio album by Legal Weapon
- Released: 1988
- Genre: Punk rock
- Length: 36:46
- Label: MCA
- Producer: Dave Jerden

Legal Weapon chronology
Interior Hearts (1985)	Life Sentence to Love (1988)	Take Out the Trash (1991)

Life Sentence to Love is an album by the American punk rock band Legal Weapon, released in 1988 on MCA Records. It was produced by Dave Jerden.

== Critical reception ==
Professional ratings
Review scores
Source	Rating
AllMusic	2/5 stars
Robert Christgau	B−

Trouser Press gave the album a poor review, calling it "a keyboard-laden cross between Heart and the Cult over which [Kat] Arthur tries to emote."

== Track listing ==
No.	Title	Writer(s)	Length
1.	"SKB (Skateboard)"	Kat Arthur/Brian Hansen	3:54
2.	"Hurt"	Brian Hansen	3:59
3.	"Kiss Tomorrow Goodbye"	Brian Hansen	5:00
4.	"Just Like a Rose"	Kat Arthur/Brian Hansen	4:18
5.	"Life Sentence to Love"	Kat Arthur/Brian Hansen	4:34
6.	"Indigo Blue"	Kat Arthur/Brian Hansen	4:05
7.	"Interior Hearts"	Kat Arthur/Brian Hansen	3:17
8.	"Tears of Steel"	Kat Arthur/Brian Hansen	3:32
9.	"Midnight"	Kat Arthur/Brian Hansen/Adam Maples	4:07

== Personnel ==
Legal Weapon

- Kat Arthur – vocals
- Brian Hansen – guitar, vocals
- Adam Maples – drums, vocals
- Eddie Wayne – bass guitar, vocals

Additional musicians and production

- Robert Blakeman – photography
- Bob Carlyle – additional vocals
- Ronnie Champagne – recording
- Mark Ettel – recording
- Jeff Eyrich – production on "SK8 (Skateboard)"
- Tommy Funderburk – additional vocals
- Andy Harper – mixing
- Dave Jerden – production, engineering, mixing
- John Kosh – design, art direction
- Bob Ludwig – mastering
- Craig Ross – guitar
