= Tragedy Again =

Studio album by D.I.
- Released: 1989
- Genre: Punk rock
- Label: Triple X
- Producer: D.I., Dean Naleway

D.I. chronology
What Good Is Grief to a God? (1988)	Tragedy Again (1989)	State of Shock (1994)

Professional ratings
Review scores
Source	Rating
AllMusic	2/5 stars

Tragedy Again is the fourth full-length studio album by American punk rock band D.I., released in 1989.

Overall, this album is considerably more straightforward and as strong as the band's anticipated but disappointing 1988 album What Good Is Grief to a God? Like many of their albums, it became a cult favorite among die-hard D.I. fans. This was the only D.I. studio album to feature guitarist Sean Elliott, who replaced Mark "The Kid" Creak during the What Good Is Grief to a God? tour, but left around 1991.

Tragedy Again was also the first D.I. album not featuring any re-recordings of songs from their previous albums.

== Track listing ==
1. "Tragedy Again" (2:34)
2. "Chiva" (2:09)
3. "Nick the Whip" (3:00)
4. "Manhole" (2:19)
5. "Shashu" (1:21)
6. "Backseat Driver" (2:19)
7. "Blue Velvet" (1:50)
8. "Love to Me Is Sin" (1:40)
9. "HVY-DRT" (1:18)
10. "On Our Way" (3:29)
11. "Cocktail Flu" (2:47)

Note: The track listing of the CD version is actually different from the LP and cassette versions. Between "Shashu" and "Backstreet Driver", there is an untitled hidden track, and another between "On Our Way" and the last song.

== Personnel ==
- Casey Royer - lead vocals
- Sean Elliot - guitars, vocals
- John Bosco - guitars, vocals
- Hedge - bass
- Stevie DRT - drums
