= On the Western Front =

Studio album by D.I.
- Released: August 14, 2007
- Recorded: 2004–2007
- Genre: Punk rock
- Length: 28:00
- Label: Suburban Noize Records
- Producer: Ronnie King

D.I. chronology
| Caseyology (2002) | On the Western Front (2007) |

On the Western Front is D.I.'s seventh full-length. Like their previous album Caseyology (2002), frontman Casey Royer is the only original member performing on this album. Work on the album began in 2004, but it was not released until 2007. The album was delayed numerous times before finally being completed in 2007. The reason for the delay was because of a touring schedule and record company problems before they signed Suburban Noize Records, who released this album.

== Track listing ==
1. "On the Western Front" (2:13)
2. "OC's Burning" (3:01)
3. "Disease" (2:35)
4. "Gutters of Paradise" (3:19)
5. "Prison Riot" (2:21)
6. "Punk Rock Suicide" (3:02)
7. "Skate or Die" (0:51)
8. "Voices" (3:22)
9. "Fatso Nero" (2:11)
10. "Just Like You" (2:50)
11. "PCH" (1:38)
12. "It's Over" (2:37)

== Trivia ==
An older version of "Gutters of Paradise" appears on the Finger Records compilation Redefining Scenes.

== Personnel ==
- Casey Royer - Vocals
- Chckn - Guitars
- Clinton - Guitars
- Eddie Tater - Bass
- Joey Tater - Drums
