= Take Out the Trash =

Studio album by Legal Weapon
- Released: 1991
- Genre: Punk rock
- Length: 43:27
- Label: Triple X
- Producers: Ron Champagne, Legal Weapon

Legal Weapon chronology
Life Sentence to Love (1988)	Take Out the Trash (1991)	Squeeze Me Like an Anaconda (1994)

Take Out the Trash is an album by the American punk rock band Legal Weapon. It was released in 1991 on Triple X Records.

The photography for the album was by Edward Colver.

== Critical reception ==
Professional ratings
Review scores
Source	Rating
AllMusic	2.5/5 stars
Robert Christgau	(3-star Honorable Mention)

AllMusic called it a "generally decent, if less than exceptional, slice of hard rock/arena rock."

== Track listing ==
All songs written by Kat Arthur and Brian Hansen, except "96 Tears" by Rudy Martinez.

No.	Title	Length
1.	"Under Fire"	3:57
2.	"No Amount of Devotion"	4:20
3.	"Just a Mile"	3:50
4.	"Charlamaine"	3:24
5.	"Slow Burn"	4:41
6.	"96 Tears" (? and the Mysterians cover)	3:40
7.	"Who's Crying"	3:13
8.	"City in the Tears"	4:37
9.	"Sorry"	4:18
10.	"Vail"	4:03
11.	"Push"	3:29

== Personnel ==
Legal Weapon

- Kat Arthur – vocals
- Danny Halperin – drums
- Brian Hansen – guitar, vocals
- Tom Slick – bass guitar, vocals

Additional musicians and production

- Ron Champagne – production, engineering
- Ed Colver – photography
- Legal Weapon – production
- Pete Magdaleno – engineering
