= Adolescents (album) =

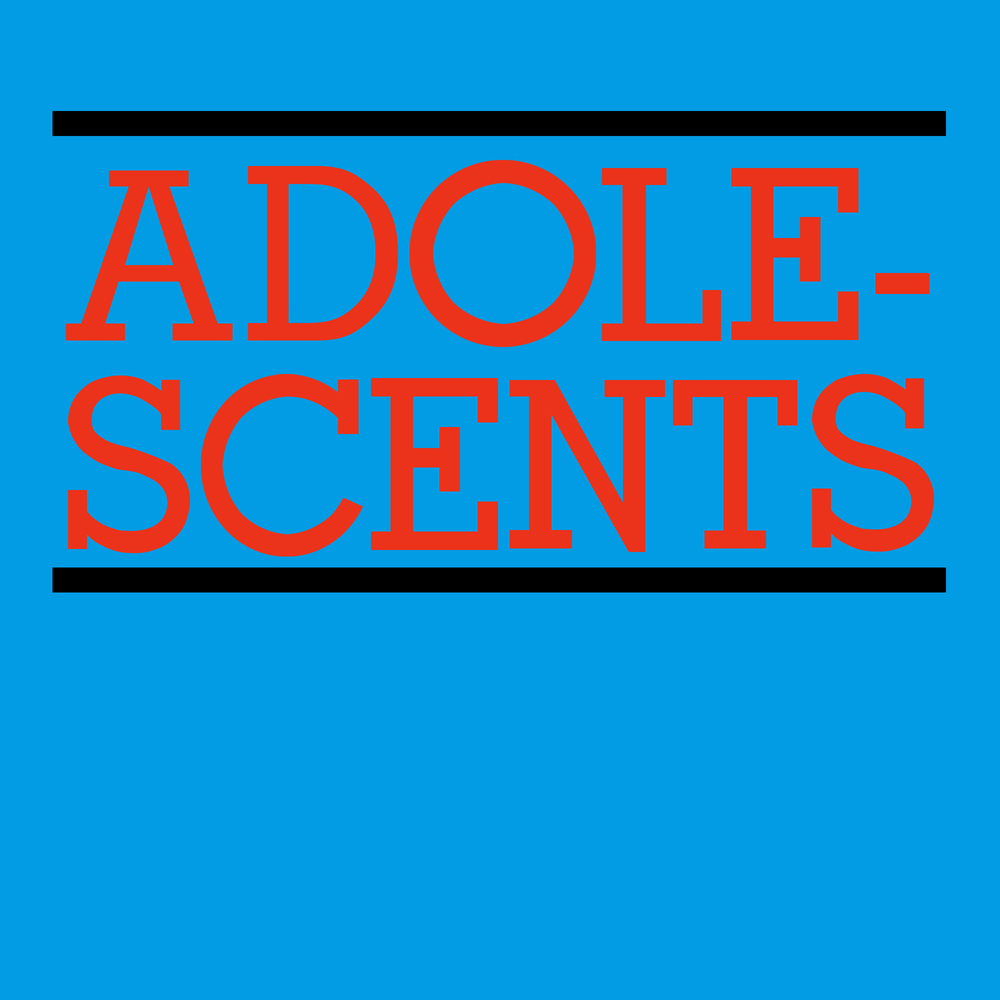

Studio album by the Adolescents
- Released: April 1981
- Recorded: March 1981
- Studios: Perspective Sound, Sun Valley, Los Angeles
- Genres: Hardcore punk, punk rock
- Length: 28:01
- Label: Frontier (1003)
- Producer: Mike Patton

Adolescents chronology
Adolescents (1981)	Welcome to Reality (1981)

Adolescents, also known as The Blue Album due to its cover design, is the debut studio album by American punk rock band the Adolescents, released in April 1981 on Frontier Records. Recorded after guitarist Rikk Agnew and drummer Casey Royer joined the band, it features several songs written for their prior group, the Detours, including "Kids of the Black Hole" and "Amoeba", which became two of the Adolescents' most well-known songs. Adolescents was one of the first hardcore punk albums to be widely distributed throughout the United States, and became one of the best-selling California hardcore albums of its time. The band never toured in support of it, and broke up four months after its release. The Blue Album lineup of Agnew, Royer, guitarist Frank Agnew, bassist Steve Soto and singer Tony Brandenburg reunited several times in subsequent years, but only for brief periods.

== Background and recording ==
The Adolescents formed in Fullerton, California, in January 1980. The original lineup consisted of singer Tony Brandenburg (who used the stage name Tony Cadena), bassist Steve Soto, guitarists Frank Agnew and John O'Donovan, and a drummer who went by the stage name Peter Pan. They began performing locally and recorded their first demo tape that March. A second demo tape, recorded that May, included the songs "I Hate Children", "No Friends", "Who Is Who" and "Wrecking Crew". "I Hate Children" was inspired by a conversation Brandenburg overheard while riding a bus: "It was a snapshot of a man saying to his wife — with his children there crying — that he hated children, can't stand them", he said in 2011. "And this was the same message that my father had given me. When I expressed that, people didn't understand where that was coming from. I wasn't saying this was me. I'm mirroring something that I'm seeing right now. This is what is going on in my life."

O'Donovan and Pan both left the band in June 1980. Frank Agnew's older brother, Rikk Agnew, joined the group, initially on drums, but soon switched to guitar and brought in drummer Casey Royer. Royer and Rikk Agnew brought with them several songs written for their previous band, the Detours, including "Amoeba", "No Way", "Creatures", "Rip It Up", and "Kids of the Black Hole". "Kids of the Black Hole" describes Social Distortion frontman Mike Ness' Fullerton apartment, a graffiti-covered drug den that was a hangout for punks and a site for parties, sex, and violence. "To me, it is one of the greatest punk rock songs of all time", said Soto in 2014, "and of course 'Amoeba' was catchy as fuck, and everybody wants to hear it, but to me, 'Kids of the Black Hole' was like Quadrophenia for us." Said his brother Frank, "Rikk's songwriting was really adventurous for punk rock. He was writing stuff that was punk but had a Beatles-esque quality with the guitar harmonies." He recalled, "With the addition of Rikk and Casey, we'd moved to the next level". They were older and more experienced, so we improved quickly."

KROQ-FM disc jockey Rodney Bingenheimer played the band's second demo tape on his "Rodney on the ROQ" program showcasing local punk acts, giving them the encouragement to record another. They recorded a third demo that July with Chaz Ramirez and Eddie Joseph of local band Eddie and the Subtitles as audio engineers. This demo included "Creatures", "Amoeba" and "Self Destruct". Joseph became the band's manager and began shopping their demo to local record labels. "He even got us an advance check that he promptly cashed and left town...Thanks Eddie", Soto later recalled. The Adolescents continued performing locally and gained in popularity. Bingenheimer approached the band to record a track for his Rodney on the ROQ compilation album (Posh Boy Records, November 1980), which featured other Los Angeles and Orange County bands including Agent Orange, Black Flag and the Circle Jerks. The Adolescents provided a recording of "Amoeba", which became a hit on KROQ that December and drew the attention of Frontier Records founder Lisa Fancher, who signed the band in January 1981. "'Amoeba' by the Adolescents is the song", she later said. "Definitely was a phenomenon. 'Amoeba' is a masterpiece of a single from any era of rock music."

In March 1981, the Adolescents entered Perspective Sound studios in Sun Valley, Los Angeles to record their debut album. Engineered and mixed by Thom Wilson and produced by Middle Class bassist Mike Patton (not to be confused for the Faith No More vocalist), it was recorded, mixed and mastered in only four days and featured most of the band's oeuvre at the time, including songs from their demos and Royer and Rikk Agnew's Detours songs. "L.A. Girl", a new song, was written by Brandenburg in response to being rejected by a new classmate who had come to Magnolia High School from Los Angeles after her parents divorced. "She made it very clear that I didn't breathe the same atmosphere as her", he recalled 26 years later. "I was trying to tell her we were on the same page, that I was her only ally. But like pretty much all the girls then, she just thought I was a dork, an insect." He wrote the song in response to the slight, later calling it an answer to the Doors' "L.A. Woman". The song's music, written by Frank Agnew, incorporates jarring shifts in tempo between fast, brash punk rock and slower heavy metal, which influenced later California bands. "No one was doing that," Brandenburg recalled, "and the only reason we did is that we were trying to be middle-class punk, but half the band also wanted to be Black Sabbath. Through the years, it seemed to really echo with people. People like NOFX, the Offspring, Rancid, the drummer in No Doubt (Adrian Young) — they have said how much it meant to them."

== Album cover ==
For the album cover, Brandenburg asked Fancher to have someone design a typeface logo similar to Cheap Trick's. Diane Zincavage designed the cover, and its simple composition—a blue field with "Adolescents" in red type—led to it being referred to as The Blue Album.

== Release and reception ==
Professional ratings
Review scores
Source	Rating
AllMusic	4.5/5 stars
Punknews	4.5/5 stars

Adolescents was released in April 1981. One of the first hardcore punk records to be widely distributed throughout the United States, it became one of the best-selling California hardcore albums behind the Dead Kennedys' Fresh Fruit for Rotting Vegetables (1980), selling over 10,000 copies. In a retrospective review, Jack Rabid of AllMusic gave the album 4.5 stars out of 5 and remarked that "the debut from these five Orange County kids established the mid-tempo, punk-pop 'Southern Cal sound', led by the long, great, pummeling, Johnny Thunders-derived solos of the two Agnew brothers, Rikk and Frank.... they're super-catchy, heavy-riffing rock & roll, proving again that punk was the true heir to the likes of Chuck Berry, Larry Williams, Bo Diddley, and Eddie Cochran."

== Legacy ==
Though Rikk Agnew had contributed heavily to the album, tensions between him and the other band members led to him quitting the band just a few months after its release. He was replaced by Pat Smear, formerly of the Germs, and the band planned their first tour to support the album, intending for it to begin in late summer 1981 and last into the fall:. Smear did not want to tour, however, and left the band that June after only three months. He was replaced by Royer's roommate, Steve Roberts, and the new lineup recorded the three-song Welcome to Reality EP in July, but broke up the following month, two months before the EP was released. "Oddly enough, we'd never even made it out of California", Frank Agnew later said.

Greg Graffin, whose band Bad Religion became friends with the Adolescents and played shows with them in 1980–81, became disillusioned with the violence surrounding the Los Angeles punk rock scene of the time and found reassurance in Brandenburg's lyrics to "Rip It Up", which spoke out against fans who used the aggressive music to justify fighting: "Have you had enough violence? / Just to kill boredom, makes no sense / We're not the background for your stupid fights / Get out of the darkness, it's time to unite / Do you think you're tough when you rip it up?"

The Adolescents' Blue Album lineup reunited several times in subsequent years. The first was a reunion show in April 1986 at Fender's Ballroom in Long Beach, California, which led to the band re-forming. They played more shows and began working on material for a new album, but Frank Agnew and Royer left after a few months. With further lineup changes, the Adolescents released two more albums over the next two years, Brats in Battalions (1987) and Balboa Fun*Zone (1988), then broke up again in April 1989. The Blue Album lineup reunited again for a show in December 1989 at the Reseda Country Club, which was recorded and released eight years later as the live album Return to the Black Hole (Amsterdamned Records, 1997). They reunited again in 2001 for more live performances, but Royer soon left, and Rikk Agnew left as well in 2003. Frank Agnew left after the band's reunion album, OC Confidential (2005), and Brandenburg and Soto later continued as the Adolescents with other lineups. Material from Adolescents dominates the band's live albums, accounting for 13 of 21 tracks on Live 1981 & 1986 (1989), 10 of 17 on Return to the Black Hole (1997), and 12 of 19 on Live at the House of Blues (2004).

Writing for the Los Angeles Times in 1998, Mike Boehm included Adolescents first in a list of "Essential Albums, '78–'98" giving an overview of Orange County punk and alternative rock, calling it "an underground classic. The 13 songs defined the O.C. punk experience, back when punk was a beleaguered subculture. 'Amoeba', with lyrics by Royer, is a metaphoric account of a single-celled creature, read punk youth culture, growing in size and self-awareness under the scornful, dismissive eye of adult authority. 'Kids of the Black Hole' was Rikk Agnew's epic tribute to the hedonistic, comradely denizens of a Fullerton crash pad that cradled the fertile North County punk scene during 1979–80. The two songs introduced a massed, harmonized 'octave guitar' blitz—an Orange County rock signature."

== Covers ==
In the decades since its release, several artists have recorded cover versions of songs from Adolescents. In 2005, NOFX covered "No Way" for their 7" of the Month Club while the Dropkick Murphys covered "Who Is Who" for the soundtrack to the video game Tony Hawk's American Wasteland. In 2009, Mark Hoppus and Travis Barker of Blink-182 covered "Amoeba" for the soundtrack to the film Endless Bummer, while Pulley covered "Wrecking Crew" and the Briefs covered "Who Is Who" for Let Them Know: The Story of Youth Brigade and BYO Records.

== Track listing ==
Writing credits adapted from the album's liner notes.

Side one
No.	Title	Writer(s)	Length
1.	"I Hate Children"	Tony Cadena, Steve Soto	1:44
2.	"Who Is Who"	Cadena, Soto, Frank Agnew	1:22
3.	"Wrecking Crew"	Cadena, Soto	2:06
4.	"L.A. Girl"	Cadena, F. Agnew	1:46
5.	"Self Destruct"	Cadena, Soto	0:47
6.	"Kids of the Black Hole"	Rikk Agnew	5:26

Side two
No.	Title	Writer(s)	Length
1.	"No Way"	R. Agnew	2:00
2.	"Amoeba"	R. Agnew, Casey Royer	3:02
3.	"Word Attack"	Cadena, R. Agnew	1:05
4.	"Rip It Up"	Cadena, R. Agnew	2:10
5.	"Democracy"	Soto, Jim Housman	2:07
6.	"No Friends"	Cadena, Soto	2:29
7.	"Creatures"	R. Agnew	1:57

Digital bonus tracks
No.	Title	Length
14.	"Welcome to Reality"	2:11
15.	"Losing Battle"	1:35
16.	"Things Start Moving"	3:06

== Personnel ==
Credits adapted from the album's liner notes.

Adolescents

- Tony Cadena – lead vocals
- Frank Agnew – lead guitar
- Rikk Agnew – rhythm guitar, backing vocals
- Steve Soto – bass
- Casey Royer – drums, backing vocals

Backing vocalists

- Danny Benair
- Jeff Beans

Production

- Mike Patton – record producer, backing vocals
- Thom Wilson – audio engineer, mix engineer
- Frank DeLuna – audio mastering

Artwork

- Diane Zincavage – art, design
- Paul Grant – typesetting
- Glen E. Friedman – back cover and insert photographs
- Jeri Liolios – insert photographs
- Larry Rainwater – insert photographs
