= What Good Is Grief to a God? =

Studio album by D.I.
- Released: August 8, 1988
- Recorded: 1987–1988 at The Music Grinder, Track Record, Los Angeles, California
- Genre: Punk rock
- Length: 37:32
- Label: Triple X
- Producer: Randy Burns

D.I. chronology
Horse Bites Dog Cries (1985)	What Good Is Grief to a God? (1988)	Tragedy Again (1989)

What Good Is Grief to a God? is D.I.'s third full-length studio album, which was released in 1988.

== Track listing ==
1. "They Lie, You Die/Fatso Nero" (3:22)
2. "Terrorist's Life" (3:19)
3. "Sinning Artist Max" (2:47)
4. "They Must Want to Die" (2:27)
5. "Girl Scout Camp" (1:31)
6. "No Mistakes" (3:23)
7. "Shadow of a Fool" (3:52)
8. "The Puppet" (2:39)
9. "Don't Do It" (3:13)
10. "Witch in the Canyon" (2:25)
11. "Wanderings of a Giant" (4:04)
12. "Johnny's Got a Problem" (2:10)
13. "She's Obscene" (2:20)

== Personnel ==
- Casey Royer - Lead Vocals
- John Calabro (John Bosco) - Guitars, Vocals
- Mark "The Kid" Cerneka - Guitars, Vocals
- Hedge - Bass
- Stevie DRT - Drums
- Cover Art Concept - Christian Fuhrer and Joy Aoki
- Back Cover and Insert Photos - Christian Fuhrer
