= Ancient Artifacts =

Studio album by D.I.
- Released: November 29, 1985
- Recorded: 1984
- Genre: Punk rock
- Label: Reject Records
- Producer: Thom Wilson, D.I.

D.I. chronology
D.I. (1983)	Ancient Artifacts (1985)	Horse Bites Dog Cries (1986)

Professional ratings
Review scores
Source	Rating
Allmusic	2/5 stars

Ancient Artifacts is the first full-length studio album by Orange County punk rock band D.I., released in 1985.

The songs “O.C. Life” and “Falling Out” were brought to the band by Rikk Agnew and had originally appearing on his solo album All By Myself in 1982. Two other songs on the album, "Hang Ten in East Berlin" and "Spiritual Law," were later re-recorded for the band's 1986 album, Horse Bites Dog Cries.

The song "O.C. Life" was later covered by Zebrahead as a bonus track for the Orange County OST, and also by The Offspring as a bonus track for their Rise and Fall, Rage and Grace album.

== Track listings ==
=== Original LP release ===
1. "O.C. Life" – 2:53
2. "Purgatory II" – 2:23
3. "Stand Up" – 2:11
4. "Eringzo" – 2:05
5. "(I Hate) Surfin' in H.B." – 1:54
6. "Falling Out" – 3:10
7. "Hang Ten in East Berlin" - 1:56
8. "Wounds from Within" - 3:57
9. "Spiritual Law" – 3:05

=== CD re-release ===
1. "O.C. Life" – 2:53
2. "Purgatory II" – 2:23
3. "Stand Up" – 2:11
4. "Eringzo" – 2:05
5. "(I Hate) Surfin' in H.B." – 1:54
6. "Falling Out" – 3:10
7. "Hang Ten in East Berlin" - 1:56
8. "Wounds from Within" - 3:57
9. "Spiritual Law" – 3:05
10. "Imminent War (Live)" - 2:22
11. "Pervert Nurse (Live)" - 3:49
12. "Guns (Live)" - 2:43
13. "Reagans der Fuhrer (Live)" - 2:21
14. "Little Land (Live)" - 2:56
15. "Kids of the Black Hole (Live)" - 5:03

== Notes ==
The live version of "Guns" is actually a mislabeled live version of "Stick To Your Guns". The song is even announced as the latter by vocalist Casey Royer before they proceed to play "Stick To Your Guns".

== Personnel ==
- Casey Royer - lead vocals
- Rikk Agnew - guitars, vocals
- Alfie Agnew - guitars, vocals
- John Bosco - bass, vocals
- John Knight - drums
