= Legal Weapon =

American band

- Origin: Los Angeles, California, U.S.
- Genres: Punk rock, hardcore punk
- Years active: 1980–2018
- Labels: Arsenal Records, MCA Records, Triple X Records, Last Resort Records, Sewer Line Records
- Past members: Kat Arthur; Brian Hansen; Charlie Vartanian; Patricia Morrison; Mike R. Livingston; Steve Soto; Frank Agnew; Adam Maples; Eddie Wayne; Margo Reyes; Derek O'Brien; Tom Slick; Danny Halperin; Jerry Jones Haskin; Sharon Needles; Steve Reed "Mad Dog" Karla

Legal Weapon were a Southern California-based punk band, initially composed of singer Kat Arthur and guitarist Brian Hansen (both previously of the Silencers), bassist Patricia Morrison (formerly of Bags and later of the Gun Club, the Sisters of Mercy and the Damned), drummer Charlie Vartanian and guitarist Mike R. Livingston.

The band's early full-length albums Death of Innocence (on which their lineup included Steve Soto and Frank Agnew of the Adolescents) and Your Weapon were well received. Later efforts moved away from punk to a more hard rock sound. The band released one album on a major label, 1988's Life Sentence to Love, during a period in which they were signed to MCA Records.

With her powerful voice, Arthur was often called "the Janis Joplin of punk". She died October 14, 2018, at the age of 62.

== Discography ==
Studio albums

- Death of Innocence (1982, Arsenal Records)
- Your Weapon (1982, Arsenal Records)
- Interior Hearts (1985, Arsenal Records)
- Life Sentence to Love (1988, MCA Records)
- Take Out the Trash (1991, Triple X Records)
- Squeeze Me Like an Anaconda (1994, Last Resort Records)
- Legal Weapon (2002, Sewer Line Records)

Singles and EPs

- No Sorrow EP (1981, Arsenal Records)
- The World Is Flat EP (1993, Last Resort Records)
- "Totally Knocked Up" 7" single (1996, Subway Records)

Compilation appearances

- "Daddy's Gone Mad" on Hell Comes to Your House (1981, Bemisbrain Records)
- "Pow Pow" on American Youth Report (1982, Bomp Records)
- "Time Forgot You" on Dudes - The Original Motion Picture Soundtrack Album (1987, MCA)
- "Warsaw Tuinal" on Spinning the Chamber (1995, Last Resort Records)
- "Equalizer" on Slam Chops (1995, Triple X Records)
