= Death of Innocence =

Studio album by Legal Weapon
- Released: 1982
- Genre: Punk rock
- Length: 28:50
- Label: Arsenal
- Producer: Thom Wilson

Legal Weapon chronology
No Sorrow (1981)	Death of Innocence (1982)	Your Weapon (1982)

Death of Innocence is the first album by the American punk rock band Legal Weapon. It was independently released in 1982 on Arsenal Records.

== Critical reception ==
Professional ratings
Review scores
Source	Rating
AllMusic	4.5/5 stars
Robert Christgau	B+

Trouser Press wrote that "Death of Innocence catapulted Legal Weapon into greatness, and is one of the [1980]’s most underrated punk albums."

== Track listing ==
All songs written by Kat Arthur and Brian Hansen, except "Waiting in Line" by Kat Arthur and Charlie Vartanian.

Side one
No.	Title	Length
1.	"Future Heat"	2:26
2.	"Waiting in Line"	3:15
3.	"Death of Innocence"	3:48
4.	"Out Of Control"	1:35
5.	"User"	2:05

Side two
No.	Title	Length
1.	"Don´t Pretend"	4:29
2.	"War Babies"	2:10
3.	"No Sorrow"	3:03
4.	"Wanna Be"	3:12
5.	"Daddy´s Gone Mad"	2:43

== Personnel ==
Legal Weapon

- Frank Agnew – guitar
- Kat Arthur – vocals
- Brian Hansen – guitar, vocals
- Steve Soto – bass guitar
- Charlie Vartanian – drums

Additional musicians and production

- Ed Colver – photography
- Eddie Dwayne – additional vocals
- Adam Maples – additional vocals, percussion
- Dan Vargas – cabasa, claps
- Thom Wilson – production
