= Tony Reflex =

American musician (born 1963)

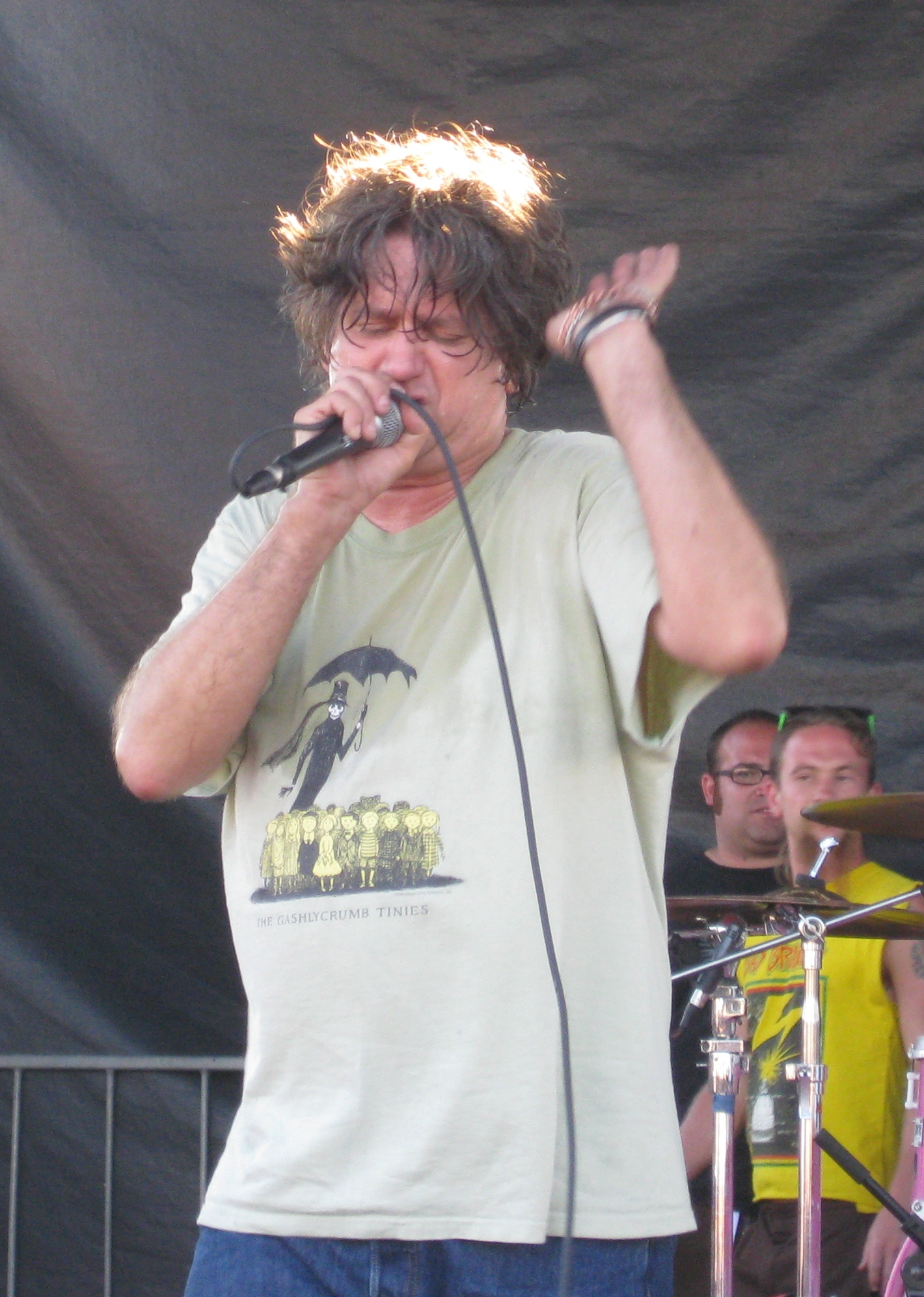
- Performing with the Adolescents on the 2010 Warped Tour

Background information
- Also known as: Tony Cadena; Tony Montana; Tony Adolescent; Tony Reflex
- Born: Anthony Brandenburg; February 24, 1963 (age 63)
- Origin: Oakland, California, United States
- Genres: Punk rock
- Occupations: Musician, songwriter, poet
- Instrument: Vocals
- Years active: 1979–present
- Member of: Adolescents
- Formerly of: Abandoned, Sister Goddamn, Flower Leperds, ADZ

Anthony Brandenburg (born February 24, 1963) is an American musician best known as the lead singer for the punk rock band the Adolescents. He has used the pseudonyms Tony Cadena, Tony Montana, and Tony Adolescent, and since 1992 has most consistently credited himself as Tony Reflex. Active in music since 1980, he has fronted several bands in addition to the Adolescents—including the Abandoned, the Flower Leperds, ADZ, and Sister Goddamn—and has performed on over 20 studio albums.

At age 16, Brandenburg founded the Adolescents in Fullerton, California with fellow punk musicians Steve Soto and Frank Agnew. Under the name Tony Cadena, he sang on the band's debut album Adolescents and the Welcome to Reality EP (both 1981), but the group disbanded shortly thereafter. Changing his stage name to Tony Montana, he started a new group, the Abandoned, which released one studio album. The Adolescents reunited, but Brandenburg left the band after 1987's Brats in Battalions, and they recorded one album without him before breaking up again. Brandenburg joined the Flower Leperds, replacing original singer Marc Olson, and released three studio albums with them between 1988 and 1990, sometimes calling himself Tony Adolescent. His next group, Sister Goddamn, issued albums in 1992 and 1995. Meanwhile, a brief Adolescents reunion in 1989 reconnected him with former bandmates Rikk Agnew and Casey Royer, and the three started a new group, ADZ, with Brandenburg now using the name Tony Reflex. Agnew and Royer left following the group's 1992 debut album, but Brandenburg kept ADZ going for the next thirteen years with other members and issued three more studio albums. The Adolescents reunited again in 2001 and have remained active, touring and releasing five studio albums with lineups anchored by Brandenburg and founding bassist Steve Soto. Brandenburg has also collaborated with the bands White Flag and Sun & Sail Club for records on which he has served as their singer.

Outside of bands, Brandenburg has pursued a career in teaching and has been a vocal advocate for the rights of people with autism and Asperger's Syndrome, as well as for music and fine arts in education. He has also written and performed poetry, and has written for music magazines including Flipside and Maximumrocknroll.

== Career ==
Tony's musical career started with a band he formed in junior high school, in which he played Tupperware, pots and pans, an Optigan organ, and also wrote the lyrics. The band practiced at his home—specifically in the garage—but split up soon after forming. In 1979, then 16-year-old Tony formed The Adolescents with Steve Soto while they talked at the end of an Agent Orange concert in Santa Ana, California. The band released a track on Rodney Bigenheimer's "Rodney on the Roq" in 1980 which led to the release of their self-titled debut album The Adolescents and an EP in 1981, and disbanded later that year. Cadena then moved on to bands such as The Abandoned and God Riots 73.

In 1986, he found himself playing in The Adolescents again, assuming the stage name "Tony Montana" when the band reformed. After leaving The Adolescents in 1987, Tony joined the Flower Leperds. After a reunion in 1989, Tony went on to start another band in the Adolescents tradition called ADZ, in which he currently remains. Tony has also done occasional guest vocal spots with Los Angeles veterans White Flag and Fu Manchu, France's Burning Heads, as well as with desert rockers Half Astro.

In 2001, Tony regrouped with the other original members of The Adolescents for a reunion tour in honor of the 20th anniversary of their self-titled album. They continue to tour worldwide and released a studio album in 2005 titled OC Confidential. Since 2007, the Adolescents had been working on their next studio album, The Fastest Kid Alive which was eventually released in 2011, as well as contributions for upcoming tributes to the Runaways, and the Seeds. With the Adolescents, he has received Best Punk Band by the OC Music Awards in 2010 and 2012, In 2003 the Adolescents were chosen as the greatest all time band from Orange County by the OC Weekly. In 2012 he began work on a four song EP with the Adolescents titled "American Dogs in Europe" for the German label Concrete Jungle.

Aside from his musical pursuits, Tony has a career in teaching, and for a period taught special education. He is a vocal advocate for the rights of people with autism and Asperger's Syndrome, as well as for music and fine arts in education. He has done numerous benefits to raise money for these interest groups, including benefit shows for the Silverlake Music Conservatory, and submitting a track for "Brats on the Beat" for St. Jude Children's Research Hospital.

In his spare time, Tony writes poetry that has been described as being "hilarious or heartbreaking"; a notable poetry reading was at the Parlour Club in Santa Monica on April 21, 2002. Tony was invited to read by poet Lydia Lunch and photographer/artist Steve Martinez. His poetry, most of which is unpublished, spans some 30+ years.

Tony has written for various magazines, most notably Flipside, "Maximum Rock and Roll", and Loud, Fast, Rules. His interviews with bands Manic Hispanic, Electric Frankenstein, and the Lee Harvey Oswald Band are among the earliest print interviews that exist for those bands. He has also written numerous liner notes for recorded and printed works, including liner notes for the Adolescents releases "Live 1981 and 1986" and "Naughty Women in Black Sweaters", Abandoned "LAMF", "Gabba Gabba Hey" (which he co-produced), "Blitzkrieg Over You", and "Beach Blvd.", as well written pieces in print releases by Bruce Duff, photographer Edward Colver, film maker Dave Markey, and photography in the poster/art book for New Jersey monster rockers Electric Frankenstein.

== Discography ==
Year	Artist	Title	Type	Role	Credited as
1981	Adolescents	Adolescents	studio album	lead vocals	Tony Cadena
1981	Adolescents	Welcome to Reality	EP	lead vocals	Tony Cadena
1985	Abandoned	Killed by Faith	studio album	lead vocals	Tony Montana
1987	Adolescents	Brats in Battalions	studio album	lead vocals	Tony Montana
1988	Flower Leperds	Dirges in the Dark	studio album	lead vocals	Tony Adolescent
1989	Flower Leperds	Heaven's Closed	studio album	lead vocals	Tony Montana
1989	Adolescents	Live 1981 and 1986	live album	lead vocals	Tony Montana
1989	Flower Leperds	One Miserable Bastard on a Pencil / The Starving Artist Sessions	EP	lead vocals	Tony Montana
1990	Flower Leperds	Purple Reign	studio album	lead vocals	Tony Adolescent
1990	Adolescents	Return to the Black Hole	live album	lead vocals	Tony Adolescent
1990	White Flag	"Young Girls"	single	lead vocals	Tony Adolescent
1991	Flower Leperds	Gabba Gabba Hey: A Tribute to the Ramones	tribute album	lead vocals on "Commando"	Tony Montana
1992	Jeff Dahl	"Lisa's World"	single	lead vocals on "One Chord Wonders"	Tony Brandenburg
1992	Sister Goddamn	Portrait in Crayon	studio album	lead vocals	Tony Montana
1992	Pinups	Pinups	studio album	lead vocals	Tony Montana
1992	ADZ	Where Were You?	studio album	lead vocals	Tony Reflex
1995	Flower Leperds	More Songs About Dames, Dope, and Debauchery	compilation album	lead vocals	Tony Montana
1995	ADZ	"Tetsuo"	single	lead vocals	Tony Reflex
1995	ADZ	Piper at the Gates of Downey	studio album	lead vocals	Tony Reflex
1995	Sister Goddamn	Folksongs of the Spanish Inquisition	studio album	lead vocals	Tony Reflex
1996	Abandoned	Los Angeles, Motherfucker!!!	compilation album	lead vocals	Tony Reflex
1996	ADZ	Hits for the Gutter	EP	lead vocals	Tony Reflex
1998	ADZ	Transmissions from Planet Speedball	studio album	lead vocals	Tony Reflex
1999	ADZ	Gigantor / ADZ	single	lead vocals	Tony Reflex
1999	ADZ	Odz 'n' Sodz	compilation album	lead vocals	Tony Reflex
2000	ADZ	ADZ / Electric Frankenstein	single	lead vocals	Tony Reflex
2000	ADZ	Five Fingers of Dr. X	compilation album	lead vocals	Tony Reflex
2002	ADZ	American Steel	studio album	lead vocals	Tony Reflex
2003	Adolescents	Unwrap and Blow Me!	EP	lead vocals	Tony Reflex
2004	Adolescents	Live at the House of Blues	live album	lead vocals	Tony Reflex
2005	Adolescents	The Complete Demos 1980–1986	compilation album	lead vocals	Tony Reflex
2005	Adolescents	OC Confidential	studio album	lead vocals	Tony Reflex
2006	ADZ	Live Plus Five	live album	lead vocals	Tony Reflex
2006	various artists	Brats on the Beat: Ramones for Kids	tribute album	lead vocals on "Cretin Hop"	Tony Reflex
2008	Half Astro	Hybrid	studio album	vocals on "IB4E (XCPTFTRT)"	Tony Reflex
2009	Adolescents	Burning Heads / Adolescents	EP	lead vocals	Tony Reflex
2010	White Flag	Benefit for Cats	live album	lead vocals on "Amoeba"	Tony Reflex
2011	Adolescents	The Fastest Kid Alive	studio album	lead vocals	Tony Reflex
2011	White Flag	Live at Bohemian Grove / Coco Hayley Gordon Moore	EP	lead vocals	Tony Adolescent
2012	Adolescents	American Dogs in Europe	EP	lead vocals	Tony Reflex
2012	Adolescents	Adolescents / Muletrain	EP	lead vocals	Tony Reflex
2013	Adolescents	Presumed Insolent	studio album	lead vocals	Tony Reflex
2014	Burning Heads	Choose Your Trap	studio album	vocals on "Stick Our Heads Up High"	Tony Adolescent
2014	Adolescents	La Vendetta...	studio album	lead vocals	Tony Reflex
2015	Adolescents	Gin	single	lead vocals	Tony Reflex
2015	Sun & Sail Club	The Great White Dope	studio album	lead vocals	Tony Adolescent
2016	Adolescents	Manifest Density	studio album	lead vocals	Tony Reflex
2018	Adolescents	Cropduster	studio album	lead vocals	Tony Reflex

== Filmography ==
- American Hardcore (2006) as himself
- The Other F Word (2011) as himself
- Clockwork Orange County (2012) as himself
