= Your Weapon =

Studio album by Legal Weapon
- Released: 1983
- Genre: Punk rock
- Length: 34:04
- Label: Arsenal
- Producers: Pat Burnette, Dan Vargas

Legal Weapon chronology
Death of Innocence (1982)	Your Weapon (1983)	Interior Hearts (1985)

Your Weapon is the second album by the American punk rock band Legal Weapon, independently released in 1982 on Arsenal Records.

== Critical reception ==
Professional ratings
Review scores
Source	Rating
AllMusic	3/5 stars
Robert Christgau	B+

Trouser Press wrote: "While not quite as consistent [as the debut], it has basically the same sound as its predecessor, but with meatier production and a solid, fulltime rhythm section." Maximumrocknroll called the album a "workmanlike collection of slow- to mid-tempo punk rock numbers made more enjoyable by fine female lead vocals."

== Track listing ==
All songs written by Legal Weapon.

Side one
No.	Title	Length
1.	"What a Scene"	2:01
2.	"The Stare"	4:54
3.	"What´s Wrong with Me"	3:54
4.	"Equalizer"	3:31

Side two
No.	Title	Length
1.	"Bleeders"	5:02
2.	"Only Lost for Today"	3:30
3.	"Ice Age"	3:23
4.	"Hand to Mouth"	3:08
5.	"Caught in the Reign"	4:41

== Personnel ==
Legal Weapon

- Frank Agnew – guitar
- Kat Arthur – vocals
- Brian Hansen – guitar, vocals
- Adam Maples – drums, vocals
- Eddie Wayne – bass guitar, vocals

Additional musicians and production

- Pat Burnette – production, engineering
- Ed Colver – photography
- Curb E. (Charlene) Hassencahl – illustrations
- Dan Vargas – production
