= Interior Hearts =

Studio album by Legal Weapon
- Released: 1985
- Genre: Punk rock
- Length: 35:38
- Label: Arsenal
- Producers: Pat Burnette, Dan Vargas

Legal Weapon chronology
| Your Weapon (1982) | Interior Hearts (1985) | Life Sentence to Love (1988) |

Interior Hearts is a studio album by the punk rock band Legal Weapon. It was independently released in 1985 by Arsenal Records.

== Critical reception ==
Professional ratings
Review scores
| Source | Rating |
|---|---|
| AllMusic | 3/5 stars |
| Robert Christgau | B− |

Interior Hearts earned mixed to positive reviews. The Los Angeles Times wrote that the band's "sound still packs a punch ... The hard-rock style shows off [Kat] Arthur’s vocal talents in a powerful, uncompromising package." Trouser Press called it "a likable but disappointing LP, with thin sound and more of a country/blues flavor."

== Track listing ==
All songs written by Legal Weapon.

Side one
| No. | Title | Length |
|---|---|---|
| 1. | "Interior Hearts" | 3:09 |
| 2. | "Tears of Steel" | 3:16 |
| 3. | "Too High" | 4:15 |
| 4. | "Ain't That a Lot of Love" | 2:44 |
| 5. | "Over the Edge" | 3:16 |

Side two
| No. | Title | Length |
|---|---|---|
| 1. | "Collisional Love" | 2:25 |
| 2. | "Except for You" | 4:25 |
| 3. | "No Direction" | 2:33 |
| 4. | "Charades" | 4:15 |
| 5. | "Damaged Memories" | 3:10 |
| 6. | "Don't Wreck My World" | 2:10 |

== Personnel ==
Legal Weapon

- Kat Arthur – vocals
- Brian Hansen – guitar, vocals
- Adam Maples – drums, vocals
- Eddie Dwayne – bass guitar, vocals

Additional musicians and production

- Legal Weapon – production, engineering
- Jimmy Zee – harmonica on "Ain't That a Lot of Love" and "Damaged Memories"
