= State of Shock (D.I. album) =

Studio album by D.I.
- Released: 1994
- Genre: Punk rock
- Length: 32:07
- Label: Doctor Dream Records
- Producer: D.I.

D.I. chronology
Tragedy Again (1989)	State of Shock (1994)	Caseyology (2002)

Professional ratings
Review scores
Source	Rating
AllMusic	4/5 stars
Los Angeles Times	3/4 stars

State of Shock is D.I.'s fifth full-length studio album. It was released in 1994 via Doctor Dream Records. The album marked a reunion with original drummer John Knight, who had departed after 1986's Horse Bites Dog Cries.

== Critical reception ==
AllMusic wrote that the album "confounds the stereotypes of ... re-formations by sounding authentic and energetic while featuring some of the best material the band has released." The Los Angeles Times wrote: "Still vigorous at 35, [Casey] Royer shows that, even for an inveterate and unchanging punk, there is a livable middle way between Neil Young's dreaded rust and a premature crash-and-burn. It's not a bad example for a big brother to set for a new generation of punk rock youth."

== Track listing ==
1. "Hated" (Michael Calabro, John Knight, Casey Royer) — 3:22
2. "Clownhouse" (Calabro, Knight, Royer) — 2:54
3. "What Is Life?" (Royer, Fredric Taccone) — 3:17
4. "Runaround" (Calabro, Knight, Royer) — 2:13
5. "Colors and Blood" (Taccone) — 3:00
6. "It's Not Right" (Royer, Taccone) — 2:45
7. "Paranoid's Demise" (Royer, Taccone)— 2:53
8. "Dream" (Taccone, Nichols, Royer) — 2:35
9. "Better Than Expected" (Royer, Taccone) — 3:06
10. "Martyr Man" (Calabro, Taccone, Knight, Royer) — 4:33
11. "Lexicon Devil" (Darby Crash, Pat Smear) — 1:47

== Cleopatra re-release bonus tracks ==
1. "Two Girls, One Stein" — 3:01
2. "Hysteria" — 2:18
3. "Buttons" — 3:14
4. "Loser" — 2:40

== Personnel ==
- Casey Royer - Lead Vocals
- Michael Calabro - Guitars
- Fredric Taccone - Bass
- John Knight - Drums
- Steve Lyen - Drums
- Tim Maag - Guitars
