= Horse Bites Dog Cries =

Studio album by D.I.
- Released: 1986
- Recorded: 1985
- Studio: Casbah Studios in Fullerton, California
- Genre: Punk rock; hardcore punk
- Length: 31:34
- Label: Original: Reject; Re-Release: Triple X
- Producer: Chaz Ramirez; D.I.

D.I. chronology
Ancient Artifacts (1985)	Horse Bites Dog Cries (1986)	What Good Is Grief to a God? (1988)

Professional ratings
Review scores
Source	Rating
AllMusic	link

Horse Bites Dog Cries is the second studio album by the American punk rock band D.I. It was originally released in 1986, on the label Reject. The album was recorded at Casbah Studios in Fullerton, California in 1985 with Chaz Ramirez (of Social Distortion fame). Due to a typo on the album itself, many fans believe that it was released in 1985, but this appears to be false because its release was delayed until 1986 to avoid confusion with the band's then-current album Ancient Artifacts. Horse Bites Dog Cries was the final album featuring the Agnew brothers (Rikk and Alfie) and drummer John Knight (until his return on 1994's State of Shock).

Although Horse Bites Dog Cries was not a commercial success, it has gained a cult following in recent times, and has been regarded by some music critics as D.I.'s best album. "Hang Ten in East Berlin" and "Spiritual Law" were originally recorded on Ancient Artifacts. "Johnny's Got a Problem" was re-recorded on their third album What Good Is Grief to a God? and would later be covered by the Kottonmouth Kings on their 2004 album Fire It Up, in which frontman Casey Royer makes a guest appearance in the cover song.

== Track listing ==
Side one
No.	Title	Length
1.	"Pervert Nurse"	2:42
2.	"Youth in Asia"	2:12
3.	"Hang Ten in East Berlin"	1:50
4.	"Obnoxious"	1:13
5.	"Johnny's Got a Problem"	2:03
6.	"Little Land"	2:09

Side two
No.	Title	Length
7.	"No Moms"	2:09
8.	"Imminent War"	1:26
9.	"Guns"	2:26
10.	"Spiritual Law"	3:20
11.	"Stick to Your Guns"	2:21
12.	"Living in the U.S.A."	3:59
Total length:		31:34

== Personnel ==
D.I.

- Casey Royer – lead vocals
- Rikk Agnew – guitars; vocals
- Alfie Agnew – guitars; vocals
- John "Bosco" Calabro – bass guitars; vocals
- John Knight – drums
