= D.I. (EP) =

EP by D.I.
- Released: 1983
- Recorded: 1983
- Genre: Punk rock
- Length: 13:31
- Label: Revenge
- Producer: D.I.

D.I. chronology
D.I. (1983)	Ancient Artifacts (1985)

D.I. is the eponymously titled debut EP by the American hardcore punk band D.I., released in 1983 through Revenge Records. It was recorded by the band's early lineup of Casey Royer, Rikk Agnew, Tim Maag, Derek O'Brien, Steve Roberts, and Frederic Taccone. The EP was re-released in 1987 by Triple X Records as Team Goon with four additional tracks: The first three—"Nuclear Funeral", "The Saint", and a cover version of Gary Glitter's "Rock and Roll Part II"—were recorded by the band's mid-1980s lineup of Royer, John Bosco, Steve Garcia, and brothers Rikk and Alfie Agnew, while the fourth—a cover version of Devo's "Uncontrollable Urge"—was recorded by the late-1980s lineup of Royer, Bosco, Steve Drt, Sean Elliott, and Hedge.

== Critical reception ==
D.I. received a positive review from Ruth Schwartz of Maximumrocknroll, who said "D.I. have well-executed, concise songs with interesting but not necessarily innovative arrangements. There are a lot of obvious influences here—Flipper, Adolescents, Circle Jerks, Misfits—but the witty lyrics and good production make it plenty entertaining."

== Track listing ==
=== D.I. ===
No.	Title	Writer(s)	Length
1.	"Richard Hung Himself"	Casey Royer	3:49
2.	"Guns"	Rikk Agnew, Royer, Cox, Beans	2:27
3.	"Venus de Milo"	Royer, Fredric Taccone	3:06
4.	"Reagan der Führer"	Steve Roberts, Royer	1:26
5.	"Purgatory"	Roberts, Royer	2:43
Total length:			13:31

=== Team Goon ===
No.	Title	Writer(s)	Length
1.	"Rock and Roll Part II" (originally performed by Gary Glitter)	Gary Glitter, Mike Leander	2:03
2.	"Nuclear Funeral"	Royer	2:16
3.	"The Saint"	Cox, Koeber, Agnew	0:55
4.	"Richard Hung Himself"	Royer	3:49
5.	"Guns"	Agnew, Royer, Cox, Beans	2:27
6.	"Venus de Milo"	Royer, Taccone	3:06
7.	"Reagan der Führer"	Steve Roberts, Royer	1:26
8.	"Purgatory"	Roberts, Royer	2:43
9.	"Uncontrollable Urge" (originally performed by Devo)	Mark Mothersbaugh	3:22
Total length:			22:07

== Personnel ==
- Alfie Agnew – guitar and backing vocals on "Rock and Roll Part II", "Nuclear Funeral", and "The Saint"
- Rikk Agnew – drums and keyboards on "Richard Hung Himself" and "Reagan der Führer"; guitar and backing vocals on "Rock and Roll Part II", "Nuclear Funeral", and "The Saint"
- John Bosco – bass guitar on "Rock and Roll Part II", "Nuclear Funeral", and "The Saint"; guitar on "Uncontrollable Urge"
- Steve Drt – drums on "Uncontrollable Urge"
- Sean Elliott – guitar on "Uncontrollable Urge"
- Steve Garcia – drums on "Rock and Roll Part II", "Nuclear Funeral", and "The Saint"
- Hedge – bass guitar on "Uncontrollable Urge"
- Tim Maag – guitar on "Guns", "Venus de Milo", and "Purgatory"
- Derek O'Brien – drums and percussion on "Guns", "Venus de Milo", and "Purgatory"
- Steve Roberts – guitar on "Richard Hung Himself" and "Reagan der Führer"
- Casey Royer – lead vocals (all tracks)
- Frederic Taccone – bass guitar on "Richard Hung Himself", "Guns", "Venus de Milo", "Reagan der Führer", and "Purgatory"
