= D.I. (band) =

Southern California punk rock band

- Origin: Fullerton, California
- Genres: Hardcore punk; punk rock
- Years active: 1981–present
- Labels: Revenge; Reject; Triple X; Doctor Dream; Cleopatra; Suburban Noize
- Spinoffs: X-Pistols
- Spinoff of: Adolescents; Social Distortion
- Members: Casey Royer; Clinton Calton; Eddie Tatar; Trevor Lucca; Josiah Darden
- Past members: Tim Maag; Steve Roberts; Rikk Agnew; Alfie Agnew; John "Bosco" Calabro; Mark "The Kid" Cerneka; Sean Elliott; Eric Felty; Wade Walston; Greg Antista; Fredric Taccone; Hedge; Dan Colburn; Derek O'Brien; John Knight; Stevie DRT; Steve Guevara; Lisa "Lisafer" Pifer; Steve Lyen; Joey Tatar; Adam Gomez

D.I. is an American punk rock band formed in 1981 in Fullerton, California. It was founded by vocalist and primary songwriter Casey Royer, after previously playing drums in the bands Adolescents and Social Distortion.

Since its formation, D.I. has had many line-up changes over the years with Royer being the only constant member of the band. The line-up began stabilizing in the 2000s, and as of 2024, the band consists of Royer, Trevor Lucca (guitar), Josiah Darden (drums) and longtime members Clinton Calton (guitar) and Eddie Tatar (bass). The band has continued to work, although they have had inactive periods, which include the band going on hiatus between albums. During their years of touring and recording albums, D.I. have never gained a huge mainstream success, but they have influenced many of the 1990s era melodic hardcore punk and punk rock revival bands, including Face to Face, Guttermouth, Jughead's Revenge, The Offspring, and Pennywise. Members of the band also joined up with Daddy X and the Dirtball of the Kottonmouth Kings, to create the punk rock band the X-Pistols, in 2010.

== History ==
=== Early history (1981–1986) ===
D.I. was formed in 1981 after the Adolescents' first break-up. The band's name initially stood for "Drug Ideology", but now, the initials no longer have any meaning. Their original line-up consisted of Casey Royer on vocals, Tim Maag on guitar, Fredric Taccone on bass guitar, and Derek O'Brien on drums. The band combined the Orange County hardcore punk sound with a decidedly surf and new wave style on their debut self-titled EP. The EP featured five songs, including "Richard Hung Himself" (originally written by Casey Royer while he played for the Adolescents, recorded with the Adolescents and later re-recorded with D.I.), "Venus De Milo", "Reagan der Führer", "Purgatory", and "Guns". This EP was later reissued as Team Goon with extra tracks including versions of Gary Glitter's "Rock and Roll Part II", “The Saint,” and “Nuclear Funeral.” The album was later released as a CD which added a cover of DEVO's “Uncontrollable Urge,” which itself was originally released by XXX Records as the B-side on the 7-inch EP along with “Surfing Anarchy.”

In 1983, D.I. appeared in the coming-of-age feature film Suburbia, directed by Penelope Spheeris. The band appeared onstage playing “Richard Hung Himself” and appeared on the film’s soundtrack at a time when there was scant representation of punk music in mainstream media. A longer set was later released on a DVD called DI - The Suburbia Sessions 1983.

The band's first studio album Ancient Artifacts was a more straight ahead Orange County-sounding album that included a new version of "Purgatory" from the EP. Not long after the release of Ancient Artifacts, D.I. returned to the studio to record their second album Horse Bites Dog Cries, which was not released until 1986 (although the album itself has copyright date of 1985). This is generally considered their best studio album.

=== Two more albums and hiatus (1987–1992) ===
Before recording sessions for their next album commenced, guitarist Rikk Agnew left D.I. in 1987 to pursue his career with the Adolescents. Agnew was replaced in D.I. by Hedge on bass guitar. Alfie Agnew played guitar, and Bosco was switched from bass to second guitar. Eventually Mark "The Kid" Cerneka from Brea Olinda High School replaced Alfie. The resulting album, What Good Is Grief to a God? (1988), was a commercial failure. After the 1988 US tour, "The Kid" left and was replaced by Sean Elliot. The 7-inch Single. "Don't Do It" b/w "Johnny's Got a Problem" was released that year on Triple X, blue vinyl in partnership with Circle A Skateboards. This was given away as a promo with a skateboard. Some released with picture sleeves. In 1989, D.I. released their next album Tragedy Again. That year another 7-inch Single was released on red vinyl again on Triple X records. "Surfin' Anarchy" (Beach Boys cover) b/w a cover of Devo’s "Uncontrollable Urge".

=== Return and more line-up changes (1993–2010) ===
A live album, Live at a Dive, was released in 1993. After Stevie DRT left the band, original drummer John Knight rejoined, and their fifth album State of Shock was released the following year. Chris Roboson and Steve Lyen joined and continued playing from 1995 to 1997. The band lost their record label soon afterwards. After two years of strictly playing live shows, and original guitarist Tim Maag replacing Roboson, D.I. headed back into the studio around 1997 to record what would be their follow-up to State of Shock and shopped the tracks around to labels without finding a taker.

Numerous line-up changes went on before they solidified their line-up, consisting of Royer, Chckn (guitars), Clinton Calton (guitars), Eddie Tatar (bass) and Joey Tatar (drums). Royer remained the only constant member of the band. D.I. continued touring for years and released their first original album in eight years, titled Caseyology, in 2002. Caseyology was followed up five years later by On the Western Front (2007) released on the Suburban Noize label, with all music and lyrics written by Royer and Tatar. In 2009, the band released the tracks "Potbelly", "D.I.", "The Dehumanizers", and "Embrace The Kill – Shut the Fuck Up and Listen!!!" through PB Records.

=== Legal troubles and more music (2011–present) ===
In March 2011, Casey Royer was arrested for child abuse, child endangerment and overdosing on heroin in the presence of his 12-year-old son. The child abuse and child endangerment charges were dropped, but he was sentenced to a 90-day jail term and placed on probation for three years for the substance abuse misdemeanor. After this, Royer got clean and sober, and D.I. returned to touring and playing live shows.

In 2012, the band released a new 7-inch EP, United We Slam through Hand Grenade Records.

== Line-ups ==
Dates	Members & prominent instruments	Releases
(1981–1983)	Casey Royer – vocals; Tim Maag – guitars; Fredric Taccone – bass; Derek O'Brien – drums	"Guns", "Venus De Milo" and "Purgatory from D.I. (1983)
(1983)	Casey Royer – vocals; Steve Roberts – guitars; Fredric Taccone – bass; Rikk Agnew – drums, keyboards	"Richard Hung Himself", "Reagan der Führer" from D.I. (1983)
(1983–1984)	Casey Royer – vocals; Rikk Agnew – guitars, keyboards; Alfie Agnew – guitars; Tim Maag – guitars; Derek O'Brien – drums; Wade Walston – bass	
(1984–1986)	Casey Royer – vocals; Rikk Agnew – guitars; Alfie Agnew – guitars; John "Bosco" Calabro – bass; John Knight – drums	Ancient Artifacts (1985); Horse Bites Dog Cries (1986)
(1986–1987)	Casey Royer – vocals; Rikk Agnew – guitars; Alfie Agnew – guitars; John "Bosco" Calabro – bass; Stevie DRT – drums	"Rock and Roll Part II", "Nuclear Funeral" and "The Saint" from Team Goon
(1987–1988)	Casey Royer – vocals; John "Bosco" Calabro – guitars; Mark "The Kid" Cerneka – guitars; Hedge – bass; Stevie DRT – drums	What Good Is Grief to a God? (1988)
(1988–1990)	Casey Royer – vocals; Sean Elliott – guitars, vocals; John "Bosco" Calabro – guitars, vocals; Hedge – Bass; Stevie DRT – Drums	Tragedy Again; "Surfin' Anarchy" 7-inch
(1990–1992)	Casey Royer – vocals; Sean Elliott – guitars, vocals; Alfie Agnew – guitars, vocals; Dan Colburn – bass; Stevie DRT – drums	Live at a Dive (1993)
(1992–1995)	Casey Royer – vocals; Michael Calabro – guitars; Fredric Taccone – bass; John Knight – drums	State of Shock (1994)
(1995–1997)	Casey Royer – vocals; Chris Roboson – guitars; Tim Maag – guitars; Fredric Taccone – bass; Steve Lyen – drums	
(1997–1998)	Casey Royer – vocals; Tim Maag– guitars; Fredric Taccone – bass; Derek O'Brien – drums	
(1998–1999)	Casey Royer – vocals; Chckn – guitars, vocals; Fredric Taccone – bass; Derek O'Brien– drums	
(2000–2001)	Casey Royer – vocals; Chckn – guitars; Sean Elliott – guitars; Lisa "Lisafer" Pifer – bass; Steve Guevara aka: "Steve Gee" – drums	
(2001–2003)	Casey Royer – vocals; Chckn – guitars; Clinton Calton; Eddie Tater – bass; Steve Gee – drums	
(2003–2008)	Casey Royer – vocals; Chckn – guitars – vocals; Clinton Calton – guitars; Eddie Tater – bass; Joey Tater – drums	On the Western Front (2007)
(2008–April 2018)	Casey Royer – vocals; Clinton Calton – guitars; Eddie Tatar – bass; Joey Tatar – drums	United We Slam (2012)
(April 2018 – present)	Casey Royer – vocals; Clinton Calton – guitars; Trevor Lucca – guitars; Eddie Tatar – bass; Joey Tatar – drums	
(April 2018 – late 2023)	Casey Royer – vocals; Clinton Calton – guitars; Trevor Lucca – guitars; Eddie Tatar – bass; Joey Tatar – drums	Flashback Favorites (2020); Greatest Hits A-Z (2021)
(late 2023)	Casey Royer – vocals; Clinton Calton – guitars; Trevor Lucca – guitars; Eddie Tatar – bass; Adam Gomez – drums	
(early 2024 – present)	Casey Royer – vocals; Clinton Calton – guitars; Trevor Lucca – guitars; Eddie Tatar – bass; Josiah Darden – drums	

== Discography ==
=== Studio releases ===
Year	Title	Notes
1985	Ancient Artifacts	Debut album.
1986	Horse Bites Dog Cries	Contains material from Ancient Artifacts.
1988	What Good Is Grief to a God?	Contains a re-recording of "Johnny's Got a Problem".
1989	Tragedy Again	First D.I. album not featuring re-recordings of any song from their previous albums.
1994	State of Shock	Also re-released with Demo EP Bonus Tracks recorded 1996–97.
2002	Caseyology	First studio album since 1994; also features re-recordings of original songs and features live tracks on some versions.
2007	On the Western Front	Second D.I. album featuring only one re-recording of a song from their previous albums.
2020	Flashback Favorites	Covers album

=== EP, compilation and live albums ===
Year	Title	Notes
1983	D.I.	EP; re-released in 1987 as Team Goon with four bonus tracks.
1987	Rat Music for Rat People, Vol. 3	Compilation (CD Presents, 1987)
1988	"Don't Do It" 7-inch	Promotional release given out with skateboard. Not all had sleeves.
1989	"Surfin' Anarchy" 7-inch	Single
1991	Gabba Gabba Hey: A Tribute to the Ramones	Covered "she's a sensation" on Triple X Records tribute album.
1993	Live at a Dive	Live
1996	"Zwei Frau Und Eins Stein" 7-inch	Single
1999	Short Music for Short People	Compilation including various other bands.
2003	Best of D.I.	Compilation
2004	Redefining Scenes 2	Compilation including various other bands.
2012	United We Slam	EP containing 4 new original songs, the first to be released on the band's own label Hand Grenade Records.
2021	Greatest Hits A-Z	Re-recordings of the band's "biggest and best hits"
