= Rikk Agnew =

American musician (born 1958)

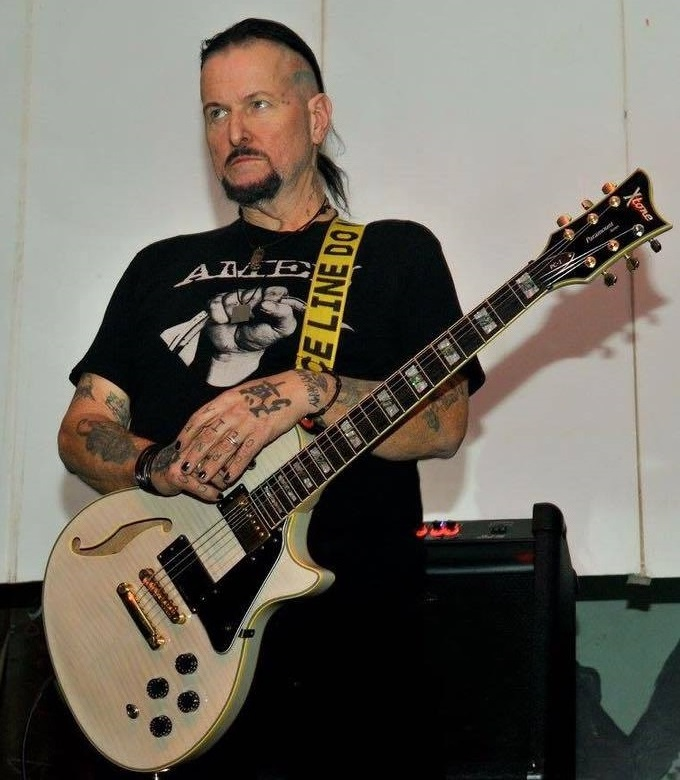
- Agnew at SubMission, with the Gitane Demone quartet, in 2015
- Born: Richard Francis Agnew, Jr. December 9, 1958 (age 67); Newport Beach, California, U.S.
- Occupations: Musician; singer; songwriter; record producer
- Years active: 1978–present
- Children: 1
- Relatives: Frank Agnew (brother); Alfie Agnew (brother)
- Musical career
- Genres: Punk rock; hardcore punk; skate punk; gothic rock; deathrock; post-punk
- Instruments: Vocals; guitar; drums; bass guitar; keyboards
- Labels: Frontier; Triple X
- Formerly of: Social Distortion; Adolescents; Christian Death; D.I.; 45 Grave

Richard Francis "Rikk" Agnew Jr. (born December 9, 1958) is an American musician with a career spanning more than 40 years. A multi-instrumentalist, he has previously been a member of some of the most influential bands of the Orange County hardcore punk genre, as well as the influential deathrock band Christian Death. During his years with the Adolescents, Agnew became known as one of the best guitarists in the Southern California hardcore punk scene.

Agnew has also pursued a solo career and released his debut studio album, All by Myself, in 1982. He has since released two more solo albums, Emotional Vomit in 1990 and Turtle in 1992.

== Early life and education ==
Richard Francis Agnew, Jr. was born on December 9, 1958, in Newport Beach, California. He is half Irish and half Mexican-American and was raised in a blue-collar neighborhood in Fullerton, California. He attended Fullerton High School. Despite graduating with a 4.2 GPA, he loathed high school, saying it "destroyed more than it taught socially" and describing it as a place where people going through the changes of puberty and angst are being taught together to learn stuff for their lives. Because he was shy, Agnew gravitated toward music, and played various instruments that he and his younger brothers Frank and Alfie found around the house.

== Career ==
With Casey Royer, Agnew played bass in Social Distortion from late 1978 to late 1979 and guitar in the Detours in 1979. He later played drums in the Social Distortion splinter group following his departure from Social Distortion. He joined the Adolescents in 1980, initially as a substitute drummer before becoming a guitarist. His guitar style and writing dominated the Adolescents' Blue Album, released in May 1981 on Frontier Records. Agnew left the band soon after the album's release due to personal and creative differences.

In 1981, Agnew attended a performance by Christian Death in Pomona, California. Attracted by their style and sound, he approached them after the show and asked if they needed another guitarist. Agnew joined Christian Death soon after leaving the Adolescents, writing and playing guitar on the seminal Only Theatre of Pain album, issued by Frontier in March 1982. He also performed on the band's Deathwish EP, recorded before the album during the sessions for the compilation Hell Comes to Your House but not released until 1984.

He joined D.I. in 1983, playing on their 1983 debut EP Team Goon (originally known simply as D.I.) as well as their first two albums (1985's Ancient Artifacts and 1986's Horse Bites Dog Cries) before deciding to leave the band in 1987.

When the Adolescents reunited in 1986, Agnew rejoined the band until its hiatus in 1989. He rejoined Casey Royer and Tony Adolescent to record Where Were You? with ADZ in 1992.

=== 1982–1992: Solo career ===
In 1982, Agnew released his first solo album, All by Myself (Frontier), on which he played all the instruments. Agnew went on to release two more solo albums, Emotional Vomit (under the name Rikk Agnew's Yard Sale) in 1990 and 1992's Turtle, both on Triple X Records. About the album Emotional Vomit, Agnew said, "A lot of (the songs) I wrote while I was in a very bad state, a very lonely and self-abusing state. It was a way of letting it out".

=== Recent work ===
In 2000, Agnew again regrouped with the Adolescents and continued to play with them until 2003.

Agnew toured with the reunited 45 Grave, in place of original guitarist Paul B. Cutler, in 2004 and 2005. He also played guitar in Poop (with Scott Hoogland, former frontman of the influential Orange County band The Mechanics) and the reunited Detours.

After playing in Christian Death 1334 with James McGearty and Eva O, Agnew joined the new lineup of Voodoo Church as second guitarist and performed on their 2009 album Eminence of Demons.

In 2013, Agnew was active playing in Wrong Beach, producing bands and recording solo work and various projects. He also rotated between guitar, drums and bass for Chaotic Stature. In 2015, Agnew was listed as active with the Detours and also had a touring band of his own, the Rikk Agnew Band. In Los Angeles he occasionally works on film soundtracks. He is also currently active in the Gitane Demone Quartet and Only Theatre of Pain (a band that performs the entire Christian Death album of the same name).

== Influences ==
Agnew has cited influences such as the Beatles, the Doors, Jimi Hendrix, Led Zeppelin's Jimmy Page, Cheap Trick's Rick Nielsen, Black Flag's Greg Ginn and Flipper's Ted Falconi.

== Personal life ==
Agnew struggled with alcohol and drug use over much of his career, but in 2010, had a health crisis and started an effort to stay sober. Besides being a musician, Agnew is also a visual artist, working in painting and sculpture.

In 1990, Agnew was engaged to Karen Mountain, with whom he had a daughter named Polina (Polli). He became engaged to fellow former Christian Death member Gitane DeMone on May 3, 2013. Each has a daughter from a previous relationship.

== Solo discography ==
Year of release	Album title	Label
1982	All by Myself	Frontier
1990	Emotional Vomit	Triple X
1992	Turtle	Triple X
