= T.S.O.L. discography =

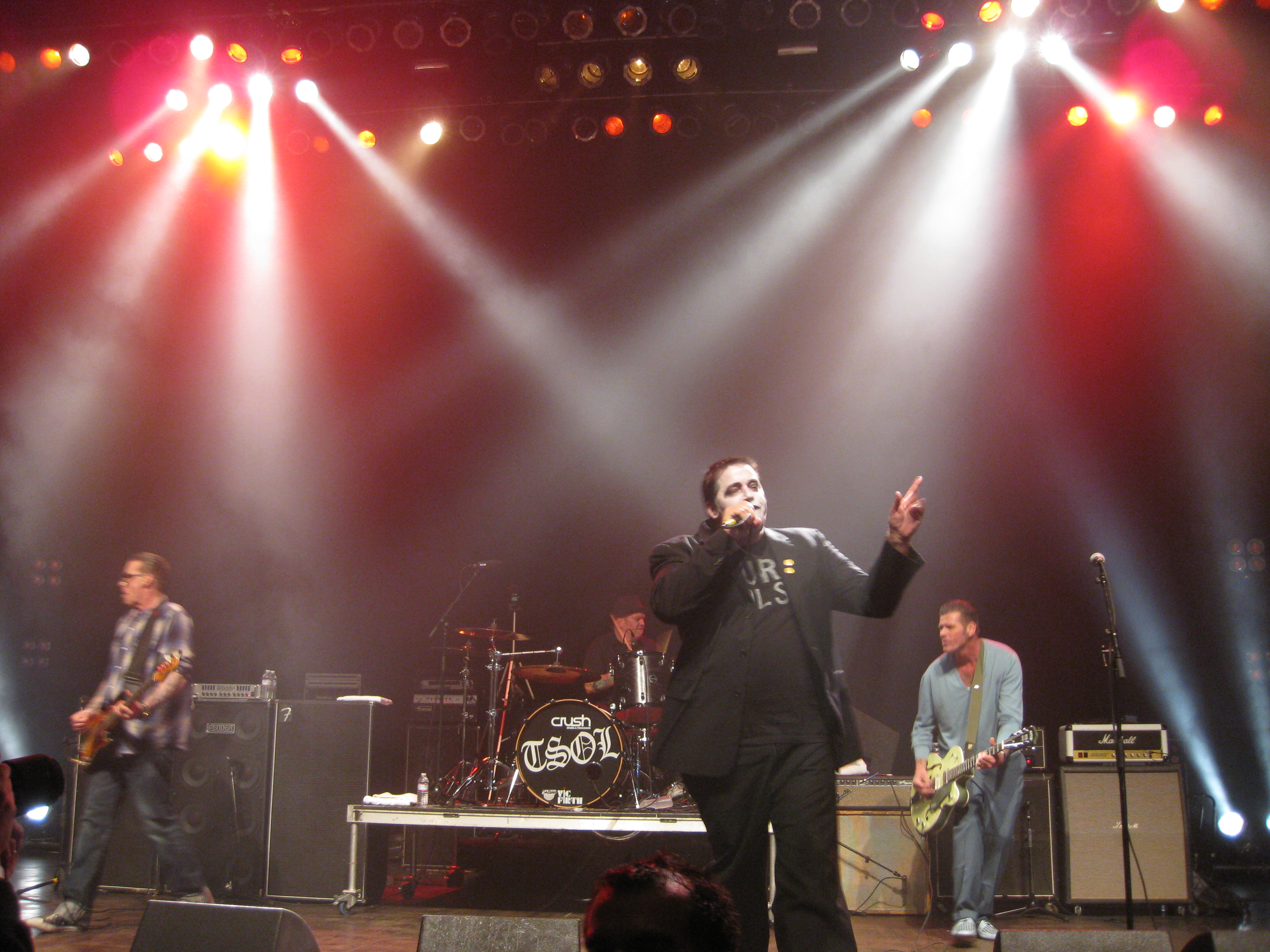
- Left to right: Roche, Buisu, Grisham, and Emory in 2011
- Studio albums: 11
- Extended plays: 3
- Live albums: 4
- Compilation albums: 3
- Singles: 9
- Video albums: 2
- Music videos: 5
- Other appearances: 6

T.S.O.L., an American punk rock band, has made eleven studio albums, three live albums, three compilation albums, two EPs, two video albums, three singles, and five music videos.

T.S.O.L. (True Sounds of Liberty) formed in Huntington Beach, California, in 1978 with an initial lineup of singer Jack Grisham, guitarist Ron Emory, bassist Mike Roche, and drummer Todd Barnes. Their eponymously titled debut EP was released in 1981 through Posh Boy Records and followed later that year by the full-length album Dance with Me through Frontier Records, combining hardcore punk and gothic rock styles. The Weathered Statues EP (1982) and Beneath the Shadows album (1983) followed via Alternative Tentacles, the latter adding keyboardist Greg Kuehn to the lineup. Grisham and Barnes left the band in late 1983 and were respectively replaced by Joe Wood and Mitch Dean, while Keuhn left and was not replaced.

The new lineup signed to Enigma Records and released Change Today? (1984) which began the launch of a ten-year run with Wood and Dean (who at times still play under the banner today). 1986's Revenge was another stylistic shift, this time towards hard rock. Hit and Run (1987) found them adopting a straight ahead rock sound and this was their only album to chart, reaching no. 184 on the Billboard 200. It was followed by the compilation album Thoughts of Yesterday: 1981–1982 (1987) and live album Live (1988). Emory then left the band and was eventually replaced by Marshall Rohner; This lineup released 1990's Strange Love. Roche then was quit and sold his rights to the name to Wood and Dean as did Emory later on leaving the band with no remaining original members. The compilation Hell and Back Together: 1984–1990 was released in 1992.

Meanwhile, the original T.S.O.L. lineup of Grisham, Emory, Roche, and Barnes re-formed and released Live '91. In the wake of the 1990s punk rock revival, Epitaph Records re-released Dance with Me in 1996 and Nitro Records re-released the T.S.O.L. and Weathered Statues EPs as a single compilation. In 1999 the original members regained legal rights to the band's name from Joe Wood, though Barnes died of a brain aneurysm that December and was replaced by Jay O'Brien. T.S.O.L. signed to Nitro, who reissued Beneath the Shadows. A new studio album, Disappear, was released in 2001 and found the band returning to their hardcore punk roots. Live from O.C., a video album recorded in 1991, was released in 2002. O'Brien was replaced by Billy Blaze for 2003's Divided We Stand, which also featured the return of keyboardist Greg Kuehn. In 2005, with new drummer Anthony "Tiny" Buisu, the band released the video album Live in Hawaii and the retrospective album Who's Screwin' Who?, the latter consisting of songs from T.S.O.L., Dance with Me, Weathered Statues, Beneath the Shadows, Disappear, and Divided We Stand re-recorded by the 2005 lineup (originally released through Anarchy Music, it was later re-released by Cleopatra Records under the titles F#*k You Tough Guy: The Collection and Code Blue). T.S.O.L. went on hiatus in 2006, and Nitro reissued Dance with Me the following year.

The hiatus was short, as T.S.O.L. began performing again in 2007. 2008 brought The Early Years Live video and the live album Live from Long Beach, recorded at their next to last show before the hiatus and released through Cider City Records. The band's tenth studio album, Life, Liberty & the Pursuit of Free Downloads, was released in 2009; It was given away as a free music download through a sponsorship from Hurley International. T.S.O.L.'s most recent studio album, The Trigger Complex, was released in January 2017 through Rise Records, with Buisu replaced by new drummer Chip Hanna. The Current Drummer of T.S.O.L. (2017–present) is Antonio Val Hernandez.

== Studio albums ==
Year	Album details	Peak chart positions
Year	Album details	US
Year	Album details	Billboard 200
1981	Dance with Me: Released: June 1981; Label: Frontier (1004); Formats: LP, CD	—
1983	Beneath the Shadows: Released: 1983; Label: Alternative Tentacles; Formats: LP, CD	—
1984	Change Today?: Released: 1984; Label: Enigma; Formats: LP, CD	—
1986	Revenge: Released: 1986; Label: Enigma (73211); Formats: LP, CD	—
1987	Hit and Run: Released: July 11, 1987; Label: Enigma (73263); Formats: LP, CD	184
1990	Strange Love: Released: 1990; Label: Enigma; Formats: LP, CD	—
2001	Disappear: Released: June 26, 2001; Label: Nitro (15838); Formats: CD	—
2003	Divided We Stand: Released: September 9, 2003; Label: Nitro; Formats: CD	—
2005	Who's Screwin' Who?^{[I]}: Released: January 25, 2005; Label: Anarchy Music; Formats: CD	—
2009	Life, Liberty & the Pursuit of Free Downloads: Released: January 8, 2009; Label: Hurley; Formats: download, LP	—
2017	The Trigger Complex: Released: January 27, 2017; Label: Rise; Formats: LP, CD, download	—
2024	A-Side Graffiti: Released: Label: Formats: LP, CD, download	—
"—" denotes releases that did not chart. 2024

I Who's Screwin' Who? was re-released by Cleopatra Records in 2008 as F#*k You Tough Guy: The Collection and in 2011 as Code Blue.

== Live albums ==
Year	Album details
1988	Live: Released: 1988; Label: Enigma, Restless; Format: LP, CD
1991	Live '91: Released: 1991; Label: Triple X; Format: CD
2008	Live from Long Beach: Released: October 13, 2008; Label: Cider City; Format: CD
2018	"Live At The Observatory": Hardline Enterprises; Format: LP

== Compilation albums ==
Year	Album details
1987	Thoughts of Yesterday: 1981–1982: Released: 1987; Label: Posh Boy (PBS 150); Format: LP, CD
1992	Hell and Back Together: 1984–1990: Released: March 31, 1992; Label: Enigma, Restless; Format: CD
1997	T.S.O.L. / Weathered Statues: Released: October 7, 1997; Label: Nitro (15814); Format: LP, CS, CD

== Extended plays ==
Year	EP details
1981	T.S.O.L.: Released: 1981; Label: Posh Boy (PBS 1013); Format: EP
1982	Weathered Statues: Released: 1982; Label: Alternative Tentacles (VIRUS 10); Format: EP
2013	"You Don't Have To Die": Label: TKO Records; Format EP; 800 copies on black vinyl

== Video albums ==
Year	Album details
2002	Live from O.C.: Released: May 21, 2002; Label: Screen Edge; Format: VHS, DVD
2005	Live in Hawaii: Released: January 18, 2005; Label: Hawaiian Express, Stuntdog; Format: DVD
2008	The Early Years Live: Released: April 15, 2008; Label: Audiovisual; Format: DVD

== Singles ==
Year	Single	Album
1990	"Man and Machine"	Thoughts of Yesterday: 1981–1982
2001	"Anticop"	Disappear
2007	"Code Blue"	Who's Screwin' Who?
2014	"Songs From Suburbia": not on a label	
2018	"Low Low Low": Dink Records	
2019	"1 Thing": Hardline Entertainment	
2019	"Ghost Train": Slope Records	
2020	"What A Wonderful World?": Last Hurrah Records	
2022	"Sweet Transvestite": Last Hurrah Records	

== Music videos ==
Year	Song	Director	Album
1986	"Colors (Take Me Away)"	Tony Kunewalder	Revenge
1986	"Nothin' for You"		Revenge
1986	"Revenge"		Revenge
2001	"Pyro"		Disappear
2017	"I Wanted to See You"		The Trigger Complex

== Other appearances ==
The following T.S.O.L. songs were released on compilation albums. This is not an exhaustive list; songs that were first released on the band's albums, EPs, or singles are not included.

Year	Release details	Track(s)
1983	Posh Hits Vol. 1: Released: 1983; Label: Posh Boy (PBS 8138); Format:LP	"Peace Thru' Power"
1984	Suburbia soundtrack: Released: 1984; Label: Restless (71093); Format:CD	"Wash Away" (live); "Darker My Love" (live)
1984	Flipside Vinyl Fanzine Volume 1: Released: 1984; Label: Flipside; Format: LP	"Suppose They Give a War and No One Comes" (originally performed by The West Coast Pop Art Experimental Band)
1984	Blazing Wheels and Barking Trucks: Skate Rock Vol. 2: Released: 1984; Label: Thrasher; Format: LP	"Otherside"
1985	The Enigma Variations: Released: 1985; Label: Enigma (72001); Format: 2xLP	"Flowers by the Door"
1987	Scream: The Compilation: Released: 1987; Label: Geffen (24177); Format: LP	"All Along the Watchtower"
1987	The Enigma Variations 2: Released: 1987; Label: Enigma (73247); Format: 2xLP	"Best Friends"
1998	Deep Thoughts: Released: August 8, 1998; Label: Nitro (15820); Format: CD	"Superficial Love"; "You Don't Have to Die" (demo)
2001	Plea for Peace / Take Action: Released: August 7, 2001; Label: Sub City (SC020); Format: CD	"Sold"
