= Hell and Back Together: 1984–1990 =

Compilation album by T.S.O.L.
- Released: March 31, 1992
- Recorded: 1984–90
- Genre: Gothic rock, hard rock, glam metal
- Length: 52:30
- Label: Restless (72581)
- Producer: Ron Goudie, Chris Gray, Howard Benson, Joe Wood, Marshall Rohner, Mike Roche, Mitch Dean

T.S.O.L. chronology
Live '91 (1991)	Hell and Back Together: 1984–1990 (1992)	Disappear (2001)

Hell and Back Together: 1984–1990 is a compilation album by the American rock band T.S.O.L. (True Sounds of Liberty), released in 1992 through Restless Records. It includes material from the band's hard rock/glam metal era with singer/guitarist Joe Wood and drummer Mitch Dean, which saw lineup changes resulting in the departure of original members Ron Emory and Mike Roche. It compiles tracks from the albums Revenge (1986), Hit and Run (1987), and Strange Love (1990), two tracks from other compilations, and three songs recorded live for radio station WBCN in Boston. It was the final album released by this incarnation of T.S.O.L.; in 1999 the original lineup of Emory, Roche, Jack Grisham, and Todd Barnes reacquired legal rights to the band's name and relaunched the group with a return to its hardcore punk roots.

== Background ==
T.S.O.L.'s original lineup of singer Jack Grisham, guitarist Ron Emory, bassist Mike Roche, and drummer Todd Barnes had released two albums and two EPs before Grisham and Barnes left the band in 1983. They were replaced by singer/guitarist Joe Wood and drummer Mitch Dean, and over the course of four studio albums released through Enigma Records between 1984 and 1990 the band moved away from the original lineup's hardcore punk sound in favor of hard rock and glam metal. Emory left the band in 1988 and was replaced, first by Scott Phillips and then by Marshall Rohner. Roche quit in 1990, the last original member to leave the band. Wood and Dean retained legal rights to the name T.S.O.L., eventually hiring Dave Mello as their new bassist. Rohner was unable to continue touring, so Phillips rejoined the band in September 1991.

Meanwhile, Emory and Roche joined Grisham and Barnes to reform the band's original lineup. Wood served legal papers on them to prevent them from using the name T.S.O.L., forcing them to bill themselves by their four full names for live performances and on the live album Live '91. For subsequent shows they would sometimes bill themselves as "T.S.O.L.: The Original Members". For a time, both incarnations of the band were active, sometimes playing the same cities on the same nights. Further complicating the matter was that Grisham and Wood were brothers-in-law, Wood having married Grisham's sister. The reunions were ultimately short-lived; the original members' drug habits kept them from performing regularly.

Hell and Back Together was released in March 1992 through the Enigma subsidiary Restless Records. It compiles tracks from Wood and Dean's tenure in the band, including the albums Revenge (1986), Hit and Run (1987), and Strange Love (1990). It also includes an alternate version of "Flowers by the Door" (a song originally from 1984's Change Today?), a cover version of "All Along the Watchtower", and three tracks recorded live for radio station WBCN in Boston.

== Reception ==
Bradley Torreano of Allmusic was highly critical of the compilation, saying the emphasis on T.S.O.L.'s late-1980s material "show[s] how vastly out of the loop the band had become. Proudly boasting the 'evolution' of the group, the inside liner notes were a detailed description of what had gone wrong with the band but written with the exact opposite intentions. The resurgence of underground music into the mainstream would have made a collection of their early-'80s material a more sensible way to promote the band, but the lack of original members clouded any insight T.S.O.L. had into their own history." In a review giving the album 2½ stars out of 5, he complained of the band's abandonment of their punk rock roots in favor of glam metal as the lineup transitioned to one with no original members:

Thus you are presented with a record that almost seems like two different groups, one that made excellent gloomy alternative rock and one that sounded like Guns N' Roses lite. The material from Revenge and Change Today? stands out for being the best on the collection, but the lack of material from the latter is quite disappointing. Still, tracks like "Flowers by the Door" and "Nothin' for You" display a passionate band on edge, making vital L.A. post-punk that practically crackled with electricity and intensity. The rest of the music is passable hair metal that hardly even sounds like the same band, shuffling through simplistic riffs and dull covers with a pedestrian delivery that betrays everything the original lineup stood for.

Hell and Back Together was the final album released by the hard rock/glam metal incarnation of T.S.O.L.; the band was dropped from Enigma Records' roster and dissolved soon after this release. In 1999 the founding members reacquired legal rights to the band's name from Wood and relaunched T.S.O.L. with a return to their original hardcore punk sound.

== Track listing ==
No.	Title	Writer(s)	Length
1.	"The Name Is Love" (from Hit and Run, 1987)	Joe Wood, Ron Emory, Mike Roche, Mitch Dean	3:08
2.	"One Shot Away" (live June 9, 1990 on WBCN)	Wood, Roche, Dean, Marshall Rohner	5:40
3.	"Flowers by the Door" (alternate version; from The Enigma Variations, 1985)	Wood, Emory, Roche, Dean	3:37
4.	"Gimme Shelter" (live June 9, 1990 on WBCN; originally performed by The Rolling Stones)	Mick Jagger, Keith Richards	4:04
5.	"Colors (Take Me Away)" (from Revenge, 1986)	Wood, Emory, Roche, Dean	4:11
6.	"It's Too Late" (from Hit and Run, 1987)	Wood, Emory, Roche, Dean	3:24
7.	"In the Wind" (from Strange Love, 1990)	Wood, Roche, Dean, Rohner	4:43
8.	"Strange Love" (from Strange Love, 1990)	Wood, Roche, Dean, Rohner, Scott Phillips	3:25
9.	"Revenge" (from Revenge, 1986)	Wood, Emory, Roche, Dean	3:06
10.	"Hit and Run" (from Hit and Run, 1987)	Wood, Emory, Roche, Dean	3:32
11.	"Nothin' for You" (from Revenge, 1986)	Wood, Emory, Roche, Dean	2:30
12.	"Red Shadows" (live June 9, 1990 on WBCN)	Wood, Emory, Roche, Dean	3:09
13.	"Let Me Go" (from Strange Love, 1990)	Wood, Roche, Dean, Rohner	5:01
14.	"All Along the Watchtower" (from Scream: The Compilation, 1987; originally performed by Bob Dylan)	Bob Dylan	3:00
Total length:			52:30

== Personnel ==
Band

- Joe Wood – vocals, guitar (all tracks); producer (tracks 7, 8, and 13)
- Ron Emory – guitar (tracks 1, 3, 5, 6, 9–11, and 14)
- Marshall Rohner – guitar (tracks 2, 4, 7, 8, 12, and 13); producer (tracks 7, 8, and 13)
- Mike Roche – bass guitar (tracks 1, 3, 5–11, 13, and 14); producer (tracks 7, 8, and 13)
- Dave Mello – bass guitar (tracks 2, 4, and 12)
- Mitch Dean – drums (all tracks); producer (tracks 7, 8, and 13)

Additional musicians

- "Jimmy Z" – harmonica (track 13)

Production

- Ron Goudie – producer (track 3); recording engineer (tracks 5, 9, and 11); mix engineer (tracks 1, 5, 6, and 9–11)
- Chris Gray – producer (track 3)
- Howard Benson – producer (tracks 1, 5, 6, 9–11, and 14); mix engineer (track 14)
- Randy Burns – recording engineer (tracks 3, 5, 9, and 11)
- Jeff Woodruff – additional engineering and mix engineer (tracks 5, 9, and 11)
- Mike Kloster – additional second engineer (tracks 5, 9, and 11)
- Jim Feraci – recording and mix engineer (tracks 1, 6, 10, and 14)
- Matt Freeman – assistant engineer (tracks 1, 6, 10, and 14)
- Scott Campbell – assistant engineer (tracks 1, 6, 10, and 14)
- Jeff DeMorris – assistant engineer (tracks 1, 6, 10, and 14)
- Ryan Dorn – recording engineer (tracks 7, 8, 11, and 13)
- John Jansen – mix engineer (tracks 7, 8, 11, and 13)
- Neal Avon – assistant engineer (tracks 7, 8, 11, and 13)
- Morgan Martin – assistant engineer (tracks 7, 8, 11, and 13)
- Nelson Ayres – assistant mix engineer (tracks 7, 8, 11, and 13)
- Steve Remote – recording and mix engineer (tracks 2, 4, and 12)
- Dave Hecht – assistant engineer (tracks 2, 4, and 12)
- Greg Zaremba – assistant engineer (tracks 2, 4, and 12)

Artwork

- Ed Colver – flame photos
- Gene Kirkland – band photo
