= Live (T.S.O.L. album) =

- Left to right on the cover: Mitch Dean, Joe Wood, Ron Emory, and Mike Roche

Live album by T.S.O.L.
- Released: 1988
- Recorded: January 17, 1988 at the Coach House, San Juan Capistrano, California
- Genre: Gothic rock, hard rock, glam metal
- Length: 59:15
- Label: Restless (72249)
- Producer: Joe Wood, Ron Emory, Mike Roche, Mitch Dean

T.S.O.L. chronology
Thoughts of Yesterday: 1981–1982 (1987)	Live (1988)	Strange Love (1990)

Live is a live album by the American rock band T.S.O.L. (True Sounds of Liberty), recorded January 17, 1988 at The Coach House in San Juan Capistrano, California and released later that year through Restless Records. It includes performances of songs from the band's three prior studio albums—Change Today? (1984), Revenge (1986), and Hit and Run (1987)—as well as two cover songs, one of The Doors' "Roadhouse Blues" and one of Bob Dylan's "All Along the Watchtower". Founding guitarist Ron Emory left the band after this album, leaving bassist Mike Roche as the only remaining original member.

== Background ==
T.S.O.L.'s original lineup of singer Jack Grisham, guitarist Ron Emory, bassist Mike Roche, and drummer Todd Barnes had released two albums and two EPs before Grisham and Barnes left the band in 1983. They were replaced by singer/guitarist Joe Wood and drummer Mitch Dean, and over the course of three studio albums between 1984 and 1987 the band moved away from the original lineup's hardcore punk sound in favor of gothic rock, hard rock, and glam metal. Live includes only material written by the Wood/Emory/Roche/Dean lineup. Emory left the band after this album, leaving Roche as the sole remaining original member. Roche would leave after 1990's Strange Love, and he and Emory would reform the band's original lineup with Grisham and Barnes the following year.

== Reception ==
Bradley Torreano of Allmusic cites Live and T.S.O.L.'s tours during this period as evidence of creative divisions within the band, remarking that Emory and Roche "were clearly uncomfortable" with the glam metal direction Wood and Dean had taken the band in, "and their contributions began to suffer because of it. Tours with the Red Hot Chili Peppers and Guns N' Roses only emphasized the dual personalities the band had developed during this period. [Live] practically documented the sound of the two sides of the band splitting".

== Track listing ==
All tracks are written by Joe Wood, Ron Emory, Mike Roche, and Mitch Dean, except where noted.

No.	Title	Length
1.	"Introduction"	1:08
2.	"Sixteen"	3:57
3.	"Red Shadows"	4:56
4.	"Hit and Run"	4:02
5.	"Nothin' for You"	2:20
6.	"It's Gray"	6:14
7.	"It's Too Late"	4:09
8.	"Colors (Take Me Away)"	4:55
9.	"The Name Is Love"	4:02
10.	"Roadhouse Blues" (Jim Morrison, Robby Krieger, Ray Manzarek, John Densmore; originally performed by The Doors)	7:39
11.	"No Time"	3:42
12.	"Dreamer"	3:46
13.	"All Along the Watchtower" (Bob Dylan; originally performed by Dylan)	4:04
14.	"Road of Gold"	4:21
Total length:		59:15

== Personnel ==
Band

- Joe Wood – vocals, guitar, producer
- Ron Emory – guitar, producer
- Mike Roche – bass guitar, producer
- Mitch Dean – drums, producer

Production

- Jim Faraci – recording engineer, mix engineer
- Michael Zoto – executive producer
- Charlie Brocco – editor
- Eddy Schreyer – mastering
- Regis Patoff – art direction
