= Live '91 =

- The cover image is the same photograph used for 1981'S T.S.O.L. EP, but given a different toning treatment.

Live album by T.S.O.L.
- Released: 1991
- Recorded: 1991 at Raji's, Hollywood
- Genre: Hardcore punk, deathrock
- Length: 35:26
- Label: Triple X (51070)
- Producer: Mark Linett

T.S.O.L. chronology
Strange Love (1990)	Live '91 (1991)	Hell and Back Together: 1984–1990 (1992)

Live '91 is a live album by the American hardcore punk band T.S.O.L. (True Sounds of Liberty), released in 1991 through Triple X Records. It marked a reunion of the band's original lineup of singer Jack Grisham, guitarist Ron Emory, bassist Mike Roche, and drummer Todd Barnes. At the time, the rights to the name "T.S.O.L." were held by Joe Wood and Mitch Dean, who had replaced Grisham and Barnes in 1984 and taken the band in a glam metal direction. Wood legally prevented the original members from using the name for their reunion, so they were billed by their four full names and Live '91 does not carry the name T.S.O.L. on its packaging.

== Background ==
T.S.O.L.'s original lineup of singer Jack Grisham, guitarist Ron Emory, bassist Mike Roche, and drummer Todd Barnes had released two albums and two EPs before Grisham and Barnes left the band in 1983. They were replaced by singer/guitarist Joe Wood and drummer Mitch Dean, and over the course of four studio albums between 1984 and 1990 the band moved away from the original lineup's hardcore punk sound in favor of hard rock and glam metal. Emory left the band in 1988, and Roche followed suit in 1990. Wood and Dean retained legal rights to the name T.S.O.L., and continued the band for a few more years with replacement members.

Meanwhile, Grisham formed the keyboard-driven Cathedral of Tears and then the blues rock-influenced Tender Fury. Barnes, in and out of jail during the 1980s, played on the first Tender Fury album but had difficulty playing the kick drum due to years of injecting amphetamines into his leg. After Emory and Roche quit T.S.O.L., the four founding members reconvened for a one-night reunion. Wood served legal papers on them to prevent them from using the name T.S.O.L., forcing them to bill themselves by their four full names. For subsequent shows they would sometimes bill themselves as "T.S.O.L.: The Original Members". For a time, both incarnations of the band were active, sometimes playing the same cities on the same nights. Further complicating the matter was that Grisham and Wood were brothers-in-law, Wood having married Grisham's sister.

Live '91 was recorded at Raji's in Hollywood and released through Triple X Records. The photograph used for the cover, taken by Edward Colver a decade earlier, is the same one used for the band's 1981 debut EP, but given a sepia tone rather than the high-contrast solarisation treatment used for the EP. Because they did not have the rights to use the name T.S.O.L., the band's name does not appear on the album packaging. Instead, it bears the four members' full names.

The T.S.O.L. reunions were ultimately short-lived; the members' drug habits kept them from performing regularly. Emory did heroin, while Roche descended into poverty and drug dealing. Grisham continued with music, forming The Joykiller in 1995, which initially included Emory. Following the punk rock revival of the 1990s, the original T.S.O.L. members overcame their drug habits and fought a legal battle with Wood, reacquiring rights to the band's name in 1999. Barnes died in 2000 and the band continued on with other drummers, releasing new albums in the punk rock style.

== Track listing ==
All tracks are written by Jack Grisham, Ron Emory, Mike Roche, and Todd Barnes, except where noted

No.	Title	Length
1.	"Silent Scream"	3:32
2.	"World War III"	2:05
3.	"Abolish Government / Silent Majority"	2:12
4.	"The Triangle"	3:40
5.	"Wash Away" (Grisham, Emory, Roche, Barnes, Greg Kuehn)	3:57
6.	"Funeral March"	1:42
7.	"Superficial Love"	1:56
8.	"Thoughts of Yesterday"	2:40
9.	"I'm Tired of Life"	2:30
10.	"Love Story"	2:15
11.	"Man and Machine"	2:02
12.	"Property Is Theft"	1:15
13.	"Dance with Me"	2:26
14.	"Code Blue"	3:14
Total length:		35:26

== Personnel ==
Band

- Jack Grisham – lead vocals
- Ron Emory – guitar; co-lead vocals on "I'm Tired of Life"
- Mike Roche – bass guitar
- Todd Barnes – drums

Production

- Mark Linett – producer, recording engineer, mix engineer
- Ed Colver – photography
- Steve Martinez – art direction
