= Dance with Me (T.S.O.L. album) =

Studio album by T.S.O.L.
- Released: 1981
- Recorded: 1981
- Studios: Redondo Pacific, Redondo Beach, California
- Genres: Hardcore punk, horror punk, deathrock
- Length: 25:50
- Label: Frontier (FLP004)
- Producer: Thom Wilson

T.S.O.L. chronology
T.S.O.L. (1981)	Dance with Me (1981)	Weathered Statues (1982)

Dance with Me is the first full-length album by the American hardcore punk band T.S.O.L. (True Sounds of Liberty), released in 1981 through Frontier Records. While the band's eponymously titled debut EP, released earlier that year, had been filled with radical leftist lyrics, Dance with Me moved away from politics in favor of horror film- and gothic-inspired subject matter. The album includes T.S.O.L.'s most well-known song, the necrophilia-themed "Code Blue". Following the punk rock revival of the 1990s, Dance with Me was re-released by Epitaph Records in 1996 and by Nitro Records in 2007.

== Recording and release ==
Following the release of the T.S.O.L. EP through Posh Boy Records in spring 1981, T.S.O.L. moved to Frontier Records to record a full-length album. This led to a dispute with Posh Boy owner Robbie Fields, who claimed the band had not honored their commitment to record a second EP for his label. The issue was settled several years later, with the band received back payments of royalties from Posh Boy while the label was able to purchase the master recordings and publishing rights to T.S.O.L.'s 1982 EP Weathered Statues.

Dance with Me was recorded at Redondo Pacific Studios in Redondo Beach, California with record producer Thom Wilson, who was initially hesitant to work with T.S.O.L. because of their violent reputation: "I was very apprehensive about it," he recalled in 1998, "People said to me, 'Are you sure you want to do this? They beat people up.'" However, he found that the band members took the recording process seriously and worked hard, the lone quirk being singer Jack Grisham's insistence on sitting while he recorded his vocal tracks. Wilson engineered and mixed the recordings, and they were mastered at K Disc. Paintings by artist Mark Wassman were used for the front and back cover, while photos for the back cover and insert were taken by photographers Glen E. Friedman and Edward Colver.

The album was released through Frontier in 1981 as catalog number FLP004. Grisham credited himself as Alex Morgon on the sleeve, following a tradition of using a different pseudonym on each release both to confuse audiences and to hide his true identity from the police. As part of his Alex Morgon persona, Grisham wore stage makeup resembling that of Adam Ant, though this was not entirely new: "I was wearing makeup when I was a skinhead three years ago, just to bum people out", he later recalled.

== Music and lyrics ==
"Code Blue"
The necrophilia-themed "Code Blue" is T.S.O.L.'s most well-known song, demonstrating the horror film- and gothic-inspired imagery of the album.

Lyrically, Dance with Me diverged from the radical leftist political themes of the band's debut EP in favor of horror film- and gothic-inspired topics. Steven Blush, author of American Hardcore: A Tribal History, writes that "T.S.O.L. were always a step ahead of the audience. Their self-titled EP with 'Abolish Government' was lauded for its political conviction. By 1981, [singer Jack Grisham] was smearing makeup on his face to affront the surf punks, and people called it 'goth'." According to Grisham, the band had been moving in a horror-inspired direction prior to the T.S.O.L. EP, and already had some of the Dance with Me material in their repertoire before recording the EP but withheld it for later use:

People talk about how T.S.O.L. changed so much from the first EP to Dance with Me, from political punk to gothic punk. But we had all those songs before we did the first EP. If you look on the first EP cover, my hair's sticking straight up, I'm wearing some Frankenstein suit, and I've got black makeup all over my eyes. We knew Posh Boy was gonna burn us, but we wanted to put out a record. So it was like, 'Let's give him these, and we'll save the good stuff for later.' During Dance with Me, we were labeled gothic/horror...whatever. Yeah, we dug up some graves but we dug up graves even before the first record. All that crap, like breaking into mortuaries, we'd done that before. Look at the first T.S.O.L. record, it thanks the church PA: we'd been busting into churches and desecrating the altars. We'd steal the PA and spraypaint the altars.

Photographer Edward Colver, who contributed photos for the album's insert, remarked "Back then, we called it death rock. It wasn't called goth yet. T.S.O.L., Christian Death, 45 Grave, and even Social Distortion started that whole mess. They all wore lots of pancake makeup and pissed off a lot of the punk rockers in the process."

== Reception and legacy ==
According to Blush, "Dance with Me's impact confirms SoCal hardcore as a source of the American goth scene." Bradley Torreano of Allmusic called the album "a phenomenal gothic punk record that paved the way for bands like the Misfits (even though the Misfits were already a band since 1977) and The Lords of the New Church to make similar music." In a retrospective review, Allmusic's Adam Bregman gave the album four stars out of five, calling it "no mere footnote in punk rock history", "slam pit-inducing, infectious stuff", and "loaded with fine numbers": "Other than the Misfits, no band has combined gothy subject matter and punk rock barre chords as well as T.S.O.L., who hit the nail on the head with this classic 1981 recording." Mike Boehm of the Los Angeles Times included Dance with Me in his list of "Essential Albums, '78–'98", celebrating twenty years of Orange County punk and alternative rock:

Dance with Me had little in common with the T.S.O.L. EP. Its cavalcade of moods and themes was kept on track by the dark authority of the playing. A spooky mood prevails on Dance with Me, underlined by a graveyard scene on the cover. The album inhabits a Halloween fun-house hall of horrors on the title song and "Code Blue", in which Grisham plays a necrophiliac giving a hilarious, if explicit, account of his preferences. It veers toward film noir for the cloak-and-dagger mystery "Triangle" and encompasses earnest accounts of embattled individualism.

In the wake of the 1990s punk rock revival, Dance with Me was re-released in 1996 with slightly altered artwork through Epitaph Records, who had also released albums by Grisham and guitarist Ron Emory's band The Joykiller. Dexter Holland and Greg Kriesel of The Offspring were fans of T.S.O.L., and listened to Dance with Me obsessively when they were getting into punk rock. When The Offspring found major success in 1994, Holland and Kriesel founded their own record label, Nitro Records, re-releasing the T.S.O.L. and Weathered Statues EPs in 1997 as a single compilation. When the original T.S.O.L. lineup reunited in 1999, they signed to Nitro and released the albums Disappear (2001) and Divided We Stand (2003). In 2007 Nitro released a remastered version of Dance with Me with its original artwork.

== Track listing ==
All tracks are written by Jack Grisham, Ron Emory, Mike Roche, and Todd Barnes (except "Silent Scream", written by David Lord Porter and T.S.O.L.). "Funeral March" contains a line from Edgar Allan Poe's "The Haunted Palace"

Side A
No.	Title	Length
1.	"Sounds of Laughter"	3:26
2.	"Code Blue"	2:08
3.	"The Triangle"	3:29
4.	"80 Times"	2:03
5.	"I'm Tired of Life"	1:50
6.	"Love Story"	2:05

Side B
No.	Title	Length
1.	"Silent Scream"	2:46
2.	"Funeral March"	1:23
3.	"Die for Me"	2:02
4.	"Peace Thru Power"	1:47
5.	"Dance with Me"	2:51
Total length:		25:50

== Personnel ==
Band

- Jack Grisham – lead vocals (credited as Alex Morgon)
- Ron Emory – guitars; co-lead vocals on "I'm Tired of Life"; lead vocals on "Die for Me"
- Mike Roche – bass guitar
- Todd Barnes – drums

Production

- Thom Wilson – producer, recording engineer, mix engineer
- Mark Wassman – front and back cover paintings
- Glen E. Friedman – back cover and insert photos
- Ed Colver – insert photos
- Diane Zincavage – design and art
- Paul Grant – typesetting
- Charles Kamm – layout
- Gene Grimaldi – remastering of 2007 reissue
