= The Trigger Complex =

2017 album by TSOL

Studio album by T.S.O.L.
- Released: January 27, 2017
- Genres: Gothic rock; hard rock; punk rock
- Label: Rise Records
- Producer: Paul Roessler

T.S.O.L. chronology
Life, Liberty & the Pursuit of Free Downloads (2009)	The Trigger Complex (2017)

The Trigger Complex is the tenth studio album by American punk rock band T.S.O.L. (True Sounds of Liberty). It was released in 2017 under the Rise label and produced by Paul Roessler.

== Overview ==
The Trigger Complex has been described as "melodic", "anthemic", and "simplistic" with a classic rock-inspired sound. The album is reminiscent of early-80s punk and goth bands including The Damned, Billy Idol, The Cult and Social Distortion.

== Reception ==
The album received mixed to positive reviews from music critics. Punknews.org said there was a lot of stuff to like about the album and gave it 3 and a half stars. Kerrang UK called the album "disappointing" while also noting that there were brief "moments" in songs like "Satellites" and "Why Can't We Do It Again". They gave the album 2 out of 5 stars. Cryptic Rock gave The Trigger Complex 5 stars while noting that the band delivered on their aim for the album.

Professional ratings
Aggregate scores
Source	Rating
Metacritic	67%
Review scores
Source	Rating
AllMusic	4/5 stars
CrypticRock	5/5 stars
Kerrang!	2/5 stars
Los Angeles Times	4/5 stars
Punknews.org	3.5/5 stars
Rock Sound	3/5 stars

== Tracklist ==
No.	Title	Length
1.	"Give Me More"	2:17
2.	"Sometimes"	2:27
3.	"Strange World"	3:38
4.	"Satellites"	3:08
5.	"The Right Side"	3:23
6.	"Why Can't We Do It Again"	4:40
7.	"I Wanted To See You"	4:42
8.	"Wild Life"	2:37
9.	"Nothing Ever Lasts"	2:15
10.	"Going Steady"	2:54
11.	"You're Still The Same"	2:27
12.	"Don't You Want Me"	4:02
13.	"Bats"	2:50

== Credits ==
T.S.O.L.

- Jack Grisham – vocals, composition
- Chip Hanna – drums
- Greg Kuehn – keyboards, piano, composition
- Mike Roche – bass guitar, composition
- Ron Emory – guitars, composition

Non-Members

- Frank Agnew – guitar, backing vocals, composition
- Beth Carmellini – backing vocals
- Alex Deyoung – mastering
- Jenni McElrath – backing vocals
- Paul Roessler – keyboards, production, backing vocals, mixing
