= Strange Love (T.S.O.L. album) =

- The cover painting by Aaron Smith is based on a tattoo design by singer/guitarist Joe Wood and technician Shawn Peterson.

Studio album by T.S.O.L.
- Released: May 1990
- Recorded: September 1989 at Sunset Sound Factory and Crystal Sound, Los Angeles
- Genre: Glam metal
- Length: 49:03
- Label: Enigma (73541)
- Producer: Joe Wood, Marshall Rohner, Mike Roche, Mitch Dean

T.S.O.L. chronology
Live (1988)	Strange Love (1990)	Live '91 (1991)

Strange Love is the sixth studio album by the American rock band T.S.O.L. (True Sounds of Liberty), released in 1990 through Enigma Records. It was the band's final studio album to include singer/guitarist Joe Wood and drummer Mitch Dean, and the only one to include guitarist Marshall Rohner. Bassist and sole remaining original member Mike Roche left the group after the recording of Strange Love, reuniting with the rest of the original lineup in 1991. Wood and Dean carried on for a few more years with other members, but Strange Love was a commercial disappointment and the band was eventually dropped from Enigma. In 1999 founding members Roche, Jack Grisham, Ron Emory, and Todd Barnes would win back legal rights to the name "T.S.O.L." from Wood and relaunch the band, taking it back to its punk rock roots.

== Background ==
T.S.O.L.'s original lineup of singer Jack Grisham, guitarist Ron Emory, bassist Mike Roche, and drummer Todd Barnes had released two albums and two EPs before Grisham and Barnes left the band in 1983. They were replaced by singer/guitarist Joe Wood and drummer Mitch Dean, and over the course of three studio albums and a live album between 1984 and 1988 the band moved away from the original lineup's hardcore punk sound in favor of gothic rock, hard rock, and glam metal. Emory left the band in 1988 during recording of demos for Strange Love, leaving Roche as the sole remaining original member; Emory has a writing credit on the track "Blow by Blow". He was replaced by guitarist Scotty Phillips from San Diego, who toured with the band and worked with them on the Strange Love material but left to pursue other musical endeavors; Phillips shares writing credit on three of the album's tracks. Los Angeles guitarist Marshall Rohner replaced him, and the band recorded Strange Love at L.A.'s Sunset Sound Factory and Crystal Sound in September 1989.

Roche quit the band prior to Strange Love's May 1990 release. "At this point we wondered if we should change the name [of the band]", said Dean, "We had eaten, shit, pissed, and bled T.S.O.L. for seven years, so didn't that give us a right to keep the name? Hell, yeah. Besides, we had just recorded the best record of our lives and weren't about to roll over and die. We had to tour to support the record." With signed permission from Emory and Roche, the band hired a touring bassist and toured in support of the album from May 1990 to June 1991. Following the tour, Dave Mello joined to fill the bass position. Rohner was unable to continue touring, so Phillips rejoined the band that September.

== Reception ==
Professional ratings
Review scores
Source	Rating
Sounds	5/5 stars

Allmusic biographer Bradley Torreano remarks that by 1990, T.S.O.L. was "a hair metal band in every way", and that "the superficial Strange Love was met with indifferent sales and a shrinking audience, a poor fate for the ailing band", attributing Roche's departure to "his growing discomfort with the direction of his band". Reviewer Alex Henderson rated the album 1½ stars out of 5, saying "T.S.O.L. had turned its attention to all-night parties and women in skin-tight dresses and high heels. Compare an early T.S.O.L. recording like 1981's 'Superficial Love' to anything on this CD, and it's hard to believe it's even the same band." However, he found some merit to the record: "There were those who cried 'Sellout!', but the fact remains that songs like 'White Lightning', 'Hell on Earth', and 'One Shot Away' are spirited, fun, and entertaining. Though it may not be in a class with AC/DC's Highway to Hell, Strange Love isn't anything to be embarrassed by either."

Strange Love ultimately became the final studio album by the hard rock/glam metal incarnation of T.S.O.L. A compilation album, Hell and Back Together: 1984–1990, was released in 1992, but the band was dropped from Enigma Records' roster and dissolved soon after. Meanwhile, the original T.S.O.L. lineup of Grisham, Emory, Roche, and Barnes had reunited and recorded the live album Live '91. In 1999 they reacquired legal rights to the band's name from Wood and relaunched T.S.O.L. with a return to their original hardcore punk sound.

== Track listing ==
No.	Title	Writer(s)	Length
1.	"Hell on Earth"	Joe Wood, Marshall Rohner, Mike Roche, Mitch Dean	4:50
2.	"Strange Love"	Wood, Rohner, Roche, Dean, Scott Phillips	3:22
3.	"In the Wind"	Wood, Rohner, Roche, Dean	4:40
4.	"Angel"	Wood, Rohner, Roche, Dean, Jim Faraci	4:45
5.	"White Lightning"	Wood, Rohner, Roche, Dean	4:03
6.	"One Shot Away"	Wood, Rohner, Roche, Dean	4:55
7.	"Blow by Blow"	Wood, Rohner, Roche, Dean, Ron Emory	3:29
8.	"Candy"	Wood, Rohner, Roche, Dean	5:16
9.	"Let Me Go"	Wood, Rohner, Roche, Dean	5:00
10.	"(Stop Me) At the Edge"	Wood, Rohner, Roche, Dean, Phillips	4:40
11.	"Good Goodbye"	Wood, Rohner, Roche, Dean, Phillips	4:03
Total length:			49:03

== Personnel ==
Band

- Joe Wood – vocals, guitar, producer
- Marshall Rohner – guitar, producer
- Mike Roche – bass guitar, producer
- Mitch Dean – drums, producer

Additional musicians

- Jimmy Z – harmonica on "Candy" and "Let Me Go"

Production

- Ryan Dorn – recording engineer
- Neal Avron – assistant recording engineer
- Morgan Martin – assistant recording engineer
- John Jansen – mix engineer
- Nelson Ayres – assistant mix engineer
- Pat Dillon – art direction
- Jeannine Pinkerton – typography
- Neil Zlozower – photography
- Aaron Smith – cover painting
