= Thoughts of Yesterday: 1981–1982 =

Compilation album by T.S.O.L.
- Released: 1987
- Recorded: 1981–82
- Genre: Hardcore punk
- Length: 19:48
- Label: Posh Boy (PBS 150)
- Producer: Robbie Fields, Thom Wilson

T.S.O.L. chronology
Hit and Run (1987)	Thoughts of Yesterday: 1981–1982 (1987)	Live (1988)

Thoughts of Yesterday: 1981–1982 is a compilation album of early material by the American hardcore punk band T.S.O.L. (True Sounds of Liberty), released in 1987 by Posh Boy Records. It combines the band's two EPs, 1981's T.S.O.L. and 1982's Weathered Statues, as well as an early version of "Peace Thru' Power", a song that was re-recorded for their first full-length album Dance with Me (1981). The album's release stemmed from a dispute between T.S.O.L. and Posh Boy owner Robbie Fields that began when the band left Posh Boy after releasing T.S.O.L., moving to Frontier Records for Dance with Me. Fields maintained that the band owed his label another EP, and withheld royalties from them as a result. The dispute culminated in singer Jack Grisham punching Fields in the face. Several years later, after Grisham and drummer Todd Barnes had both left T.S.O.L., a settlement was negotiated in which the band members received back royalty payments and Posh Boy acquired the rights to Weathered Statues, originally released through Alternative Tentacles. Posh Boy combined the two EPs to create Thoughts of Yesterday.

Originally released as an LP, the album was reissued on compact disc the following year with another Posh Boy release, Pariah's 1983 album Youths of Age, appended as bonus tracks. It was reissued again in 1992 by Rhino Records, with the Pariah tracks replaced by the 1988 debut album of Grisham and Barnes' post-T.S.O.L. band, Tender Fury, which was also originally released by Posh Boy.

== Background ==
The original T.S.O.L. lineup of singer Jack Grisham, guitarist Ron Emory, bassist Mike Roche, and drummer Todd Barnes released their debut EP, T.S.O.L., in 1981 through Posh Boy Records. According to Grisham, the band had already written most of the songs that would end up on their first full-length album, but were distrustful of Posh Boy owner Robbie Fields and chose to put out an EP through the label instead: "We knew Posh Boy was gonna burn us, but we wanted to put out a record. So it was like 'Let's give him these [songs], and we'll save the good stuff for later.'" Shortly after the EP's release the band moved to Frontier Records for their first studio album, 1981's Dance with Me. This caused a dispute with Fields, who claimed the band had not honored their contractual commitment to record a second EP for his label. "That chameleon [Grisham] had me drink the sweetest wine of fraternal love," said Fields, "and with my next breath I tasted the bitter bile of betrayal as he unleashed the running dogs of hatred upon me." The dispute culminated in Grisham punching Fields in the nose in 1982 outside a roller rink in Fullerton, California.

Several years later, Fields and the four original members of T.S.O.L. (Grisham and Barnes had left the band in 1983) worked out a settlement in which the band received back payments of royalties from the label, and Fields purchased the master recordings and publishing rights to T.S.O.L.'s 1982 EP Weathered Statues, originally released through Alternative Tentacles. Fields considered this "perhaps [my] greatest business coup" because a decline in popularity of 7-inch records during the mid-1980s allowed him to acquire "what [the band's] manager thought was essentially worthless material, that from the 7-inch EP. It had never occurred to the manager that I, too, knew that [7-inches] were no longer viable. Within a few weeks we had re-packaged all of the old and new T.S.O.L. masters, including 'Peace Thru' Power' from Posh Hits Vol. 1, and combined them in the new long play record, 1987's Thoughts of Yesterday."

== Re-releases ==
The compilation was originally released as an LP. When it was reissued on compact disc the following year, the tracks from another Posh Boy release, Pariah's 1983 album Youths of Age, were added to it as bonus tracks. It was reissued again in 1992 by Rhino Records with the Pariah tracks replaced by Tender Fury, the eponymously titled 1988 debut album of Grisham and Barnes' post-T.S.O.L. band, which was also originally released by Posh Boy. In the liner notes of the Rhino release, Fields described encountering Grisham at a party in March 1987, their first meeting since Grisham had punched him in 1982: "This time, he shook my hand vigorously and told me how pleased he was to see me again. I spent most of my time at the party explaining the liner notes for Thoughts of Yesterday, which Jack hadn't read yet. As it turned out Jack did take those comments of mine as a tribute of sorts. I even offered to let Jack write his side of the story for this compact disc." In 1997 Nitro Records purchased the master tapes of the two EPs from Posh Boy, remastered them, and re-released them as the compilation T.S.O.L. / Weathered Statues.

== Reception ==
Greg Prato of Allmusic gave the 1992 Rhino Records release of the compilation a 4½ star rating out of 5, remarking "It was in Tender Fury that the band played loose and bluesy rock & roll, and singer Jack Grisham sounds like the big brother of The Cult's Ian Astbury. But it's the T.S.O.L. punk material that they're best known for." He singled out "Thoughts of Yesterday" as "One of their best songs ... a surprisingly low-key and melodic number, which sticks out like a sore thumb amidst all the other furious thrashers."

== Track listing ==
All tracks are written by Jack Grisham, Ron Emory, Mike Roche, and Todd Barnes, except where noted.

Side A
No.	Title	Length
1.	"Peace Thru' Power" (from Posh Hits Vol. 1, 1983)	1:55
2.	"Property Is Theft" (from T.S.O.L., 1981)	1:27
3.	"Word Is" (from Weathered Statues, 1982)	2:35
4.	"Abolish Government / Silent Majority" (from T.S.O.L., 1981)	1:59
5.	"Weathered Statues" (from Weathered Statues, 1982)	3:12

Side B
No.	Title	Length
1.	"Thoughts of Yesterday" (from Weathered Statues, 1982)	2:37
2.	"Superficial Love" (from T.S.O.L., 1981)	1:20
3.	"Man and Machine" (from Weathered Statues, 1982)	1:39
4.	"No Way Out" (from T.S.O.L., 1981)	1:12
5.	"World War III" (from T.S.O.L., 1981)	1:52
Total length:		19:48

1988 Posh Boy Records CD bonus tracks: Pariah – Youths of Age
No.	Title	Writer(s)	Length
11.	"Youths of Age"	Tony Cox, Mike Smith, Ray Lujan, Greg Travers	3:33
12.	"Inside Looking Out"	Cox, Smith, Lujan, Travers	2:48
13.	"Blind Resistance"	Cox, Smith, Lujan, Travers	1:46
14.	"Faith in Mercy"	Cox, Smith, Lujan, Travers	3:04
15.	"White Line"	Cox, Smith, Lujan, Travers	2:56
16.	"All the Kings Men"	Cox, Smith, Lujan, Travers	2:20
17.	"Passion and Pride"	Cox, Smith, Lujan, Travers	2:29
18.	"Running for Cover"	Cox, Smith, Lujan, Travers	2:41
19.	"Striking Back"	Cox, Smith, Lujan, Travers	3:24
Total length:			44:01

1992 Rhino Records CD bonus tracks: Tender Fury – Tender Fury
No.	Title	Writer(s)	Length
11.	"The Apartment"	Grisham, Barnes, Daniel Root, Robbie Allen	2:24
12.	"Talk About Living"	Grisham, Barnes, Root, Allen	3:45
13.	"Big E's Night-Move"	Grisham, Barnes, Root, Allen	2:17
14.	"Statutory Story"	Grisham, Barnes, Root, Allen	2:34
15.	"Kill Cindy"	Grisham, Barnes, Root, Allen	3:16
16.	"What We Got"	Grisham, Barnes, Root, Allen	2:36
17.	"Running Around Again"	Grisham, Barnes, Root, Allen	2:37
18.	"Let It Go"	Grisham, Barnes, Root, Allen	3:37
19.	"Mercy Ride"	Grisham, Barnes, Root, Allen	3:35
20.	"Look Back in Anger" (originally performed by David Bowie)	David Bowie, Carlos Alomar, Brian Eno	3:45
Total length:			49:26

== Personnel ==
T.S.O.L.

- Jack Grisham – vocals
- Ron Emory – guitars
- Mike Roche – bass guitar
- Todd Barnes – drums

Pariah

- Tony Cox – vocals
- Mike Smith – guitar
- Ray Lujan – bass guitar
- Greg Travers – drums

Tender Fury

- Jack Grisham – vocals
- Daniel Root – guitar
- Robbie Allen – bass guitar
- Todd Barnes – drums

Production

- Robbie Fields – producer of tracks from T.S.O.L. and Posh Hits Vol. 1
- Thom Wilson – producer of tracks from Weathered Statues
- David Hines – mix engineer
- Vinny Golia – remixing
- Geoff Sykes – remix engineer
- Bill Inglot – remastering
- Ken Perry – remastering
- Marshall Wolf – cover design
