= Weathered Statues =

EP by T.S.O.L.
- Released: 1982
- Genre: Hardcore punk
- Length: 9:56
- Label: Alternative Tentacles (VIRUS 10)
- Producer: Thom Wilson

T.S.O.L. chronology
Dance with Me (1981)	Weathered Statues (1982)	Beneath the Shadows (1983)

Weathered Statues is an EP by the American hardcore punk band T.S.O.L. (True Sounds of Liberty), released in 1982 through Alternative Tentacles. In comparison to the band's previous material, its experimental nature and melodic leanings confused some of their fans and presaged the creative direction they would take on their second studio album, 1983's Beneath the Shadows. The material from Weathered Statues was later re-released on the compilation albums Thoughts of Yesterday: 1981–1982 (1987) and T.S.O.L. / Weathered Statues (1997).

== Background ==
Following the release of their 1981 full-length album Dance with Me through Frontier Records, T.S.O.L. moved to Alternative Tentacles, the label run by Jello Biafra and East Bay Ray of fellow California hardcore band the Dead Kennedys. Weathered Statues was recorded with producer Thom Wilson and released in 1982 as catalog number VIRUS 10. Singer Jack Grisham credited himself as Jack Ladoga on the sleeve, following a tradition of using a different pseudonym on each release both to confuse audiences and to hide his true identity from the police. Drummer Todd Barnes credited himself as Todd Scrivener, deriving the pseudonym from the name of the street he lived on.

In comparison to T.S.O.L.'s prior releases, Weathered Statues had melodic leanings that presaged the direction the band would pursue on their 1983 album Beneath the Shadows. Steven Blush, author of American Hardcore: A Tribal History, writes that "the experimental nature of Weathered Statues bewildered some fans". Greg Prato of Allmusic described the song "Thoughts of Yesterday" as one of the band's best from their early material, calling it "a surprisingly low-key and melodic number, which sticks out like a sore thumb amidst [their] other furious thrashers." "Word Is" stands out as a reggae-influenced track.

== Re-releases ==
T.S.O.L. had released their eponymously titled debut EP through Posh Boy Records in 1981, then moved to Frontier Records for their full-length album Dance with Me (1981). This caused a dispute with Posh Boy, who claimed the band had not honored their commitment to record a second EP for the label. Several years later, Posh Boy and the four original members of T.S.O.L. (Grisham and Barnes had left the band in late 1983) worked out a settlement in which the members received back payments of royalties from the label, and Posh Boy purchased the master recordings and publishing rights to Weathered Statues. Posh Boy combined Weathered Statues with the debut EP to make the 1987 compilation album Thoughts of Yesterday: 1981–1982 (later re-released through Rhino Records). Nitro Records purchased the master tapes from Posh Boy in 1997, remastered them, and re-released the two EPs as the compilation T.S.O.L. / Weathered Statues. Of the Nitro release, Allmusic's Steve Huey remarked that it "showcases the group's pulverizing early sound". Distant laughter heard during the break on the track “Thoughts of Yesterday” was edited out of all re-released versions, remaining only on the vinyl EP.

== Track listing ==
All tracks are written by Jack Grisham, Ron Emory, Mike Roche, and Todd Barnes

Side A
No.	Title	Length
1.	"Man and Machine"	1:37
2.	"Weathered Statues"	3:09

Side B
No.	Title	Length
1.	"Thoughts of Yesterday"	2:37
2.	"Word Is"	2:33
Total length:		9:56

== Personnel ==
Band

- Jack Grisham – vocals (credited as Jack Ladoga)
- Ron Emory – guitars
- Mike Roche – bass guitar
- Todd Barnes – drums (credited as Todd Scrivener)

Production

- Thom Wilson – record producer
- D. Zincavage – design
- Paul Grant – typesetting
