= Edward Colver =

American photographer (born 1949)

- Born: Edward Curtiss Colver; June 17, 1949 (age 77); Pomona, California, U.S.
- Occupation: Photographer
- Years active: 1978–present
- Spouse: Karin Swinney
- Website: edwardcolver.com

Edward Curtiss Colver (born June 17, 1949) is an American photographer, best known for his early punk photographs.

== Overview ==
Colver not only created a visual document of the birth of the hardcore punk in suburban Southern California from late 1978 to mid-1984, but also he greatly helped in defining the photography style and graphic identity of the American hardcore punk movement.

He was active in the Southern California hardcore punk scene during its early development. As he was personally involved in the community at that time, his early work serves as a primary record of the culture and events of that period.

His work was featured extensively in the book American Hardcore: A Tribal History (2001), written by Steven Blush, and in its documentary film version, American Hardcore (2006), directed by Paul Rachman.

== Early life and family ==
A third-generation Southern Californian born on June 17, 1949, in Pomona, California, Colver was named after an ancestor who arrived in the United States from Cornwall, England, in 1635. Edward's father, Charles Colver, was a forest ranger for 43 years. Upon his retirement, Charles was presented with the Theodore Roosevelt Conservation Award by President George H. W. Bush at the White House. The tallest peak southwest of Mount San Antonio aka Mount Baldy, was named Colver Peak after Charles.

== Photography ==
Essentially a self-taught photographer, Colver had a brief formal training during night classes at University of California, Los Angeles, where he studied beginning photography with Eileen Cowin. Largely influenced by Dada and Surrealism, Colver was most impressed in his early years by the art of Southern Californian native Edward Kienholz. In the late 1960s, Edward's perspective on life and art was changed by his exposure to composers such as Edgard Varèse, Karlheinz Stockhausen, Krzysztof Penderecki and John Cage.

Three months after he began taking photographs, Colver had his first photograph published: an image of performance artist Johanna Went, featured in BAM magazine. Since then he has shot photographs for dozens of record labels including EMI, Capitol and Geffen. His pictures have been featured on more than 500 album covers and include some of the most recognizable and iconic covers of the punk era.

== Selected cover art contributions ==
Year	Album title	Artist	Contribution
1980	Group Sex	Circle Jerks	front, back cover and inner sleeve photos
1981	"Louie Louie" (single)	Black Flag	front and back cover photos
1981	Damaged	Black Flag	front cover photo
1981	Danger Zone (EP)	China White	front cover photo
1981	Let Them Eat Jellybeans!	various artists	back cover photo
1981	Reagan's In	Wasted Youth	back cover and insert sheet photos
1981	T.S.O.L. (EP)	T.S.O.L.	front cover photo
1981	Dance with Me	T.S.O.L.	some inner sleeve photos
1981	Welcome to Reality (EP)	Adolescents	front cover photo
1982	How Could Hell Be Any Worse?	Bad Religion	front cover and some insert sheet photos
1983	Mommy's Little Monster	Social Distortion	back cover photo
1983	L'amour	Lewis	front cover photo
2019	Submit to the Blade	The Balboas	back cover photo

== See also ==
- Punk rock in California

== Further viewing ==
- Sample, Jack (2012). Contact Print: Edward Colver (documentary). The Film & Television Conservatory of the Orange County School of the Arts. Online at YouTube.
