= T.S.O.L. (EP) =

- Left to right on the cover: Ron Emory, Jack Grisham, Todd Barnes, and Mike Roche in a high-contrast solarised print of a photograph taken by Edward Colver

EP by T.S.O.L.
- Released: 1981
- Recorded: March 1981 at Brian Elliot Recording in North Hollywood, Los Angeles
- Genre: Hardcore punk
- Length: 7:37
- Label: Posh Boy (PBS 1013)
- Producer: Robbie Fields

T.S.O.L. chronology
T.S.O.L. (1981)	Dance with Me (1981)

T.S.O.L. is the eponymously titled debut EP by the American hardcore punk band T.S.O.L. (True Sounds of Liberty), released in 1981 through Posh Boy Records. Its fast tempos and politically radical lyrics established the band as a major force in the southern California hardcore scene of the time. T.S.O.L. quickly moved away from leftist political subject matter, however, shifting in a gothic rock direction and changing labels to Frontier Records for their full-length album Dance with Me (1981). This led to a dispute with Posh Boy owner Robbie Fields, who claimed the band owed his label another EP. The two parties eventually reached a settlement in which Posh Boy gained the rights to T.S.O.L.'s 1982 EP Weathered Statues, combining it with the debut EP in the 1987 compilation album Thoughts of Yesterday: 1981–1982. Nitro Records purchased the master recordings from Posh Boy in 1997 and re-released the two EPs as the compilation T.S.O.L. / Weathered Statues.

== Recording and release ==
Having made a name for themselves with their live shows, T.S.O.L. received an offer from Posh Boy Records owner Robbie Fields to make a record. According to singer Jack Grisham, the arrangement was based mostly on a verbal agreement which the band expected Fields would exploit:

It was shit money and a shit deal, but what did we care? The initial contract got flushed down the toilet at Sammy Wong's hotel when we were playing a gig in San Francisco, and we didn't even bother to sign a new one. We made a verbal agreement with the Fagin of punk rock. Robbie, or the "Posh One", was an ex-Brit, a sometimes substitute teacher who minored in punk rock exploitation. He was the perfect host for our first disc. Robbie had his own record company, Posh Boy Records. Jesus, even the name sounded like a scam.

The band had already written most of the songs that would comprise their debut album, Dance with Me (1981), but were distrustful of Fields and chose to only give him a few tracks: "We knew Posh Boy was gonna burn us," said Grisham, "but we wanted to put out a record. So it was like 'Let's give him these [songs], and we'll save the good stuff for later.'" The EP was recorded in March 1981 at Brian Elliot Recording in North Hollywood, Los Angeles with Fields and recording engineer David Hines. Hines mixed the tracks, and they were mastered by Stan Ross at Los Angeles' Gold Star Studios. The cover artwork consists of a high-contrast solarised print of a live photograph of the band taken by Edward Colver. "The Posh One went way out of pocket on this one," said Grisham. "He spent five hundred dollars making that disc, and the quality showed. You can even hear the sound of an uninvited motorcycle going by on the highway during one of the songs. It didn't matter, though; it was the feeling in the music and the lyrics that counted."

T.S.O.L. was released in 1981 through Posh Boy as catalog number PBS 1013. Grisham credited himself as Jack Greggors on the sleeve, beginning a tradition of using a different pseudonym on each release both to confuse audiences and to hide his true identity from the police. Drummer Todd Barnes credited himself as Francis Gerald Barnes.

== Music and lyrics ==
The songs on T.S.O.L. are fast-tempoed and have angry, leftist lyrics attacking the United States government and the renewal of the military draft. Grisham has described it as "four kids hating the government and refusing to get real jobs. It was muscular and threatening, anarchistic and confrontational. It was a straight up attack at the government of the United States and those involved with it." "Property Is Theft" employs Marxist rhetoric, echoing the communist belief in the abolishment of private property, while "Abolish Government / Silent Majority" is anarchist in nature. Reflecting on the EP thirty years later, Grisham recalled that the band already had most of the songs' lyrics written before he joined, and that he probably only penned those to "No Way Out". He criticized the lyrics' naivety, since the band members were too young to pay taxes or be drafted, and pointed out the lack of focus in "Superficial Love": "Superficial love, only for a fuck / But love is incest, and it's only for a buck / Eating to survive, surviving for free / Peacetime, wartime, trying to draft me...It's like, 'What the hell? Are you talking about this, or are you talking about that? What are you talking about?' When you break it down, it doesn't make much sense."

Grisham sings in a faux-British accent inspired by John Lydon of the Sex Pistols. "On those first recordings, I sounded like I was from Long Beach via England," he later reflected. "It was hard to listen to, but I mimicked the bands I loved; Siouxsie and the Banshees, Adam and the Ants, and The Damned were all English bands. There were some very cool American bands I also adored, but something about a British accent made punk rock what it was."

The band soon moved away from ultra-political subject matter, shifting in a gothic rock direction for their full-length album Dance with Me, released later that year through Frontier Records. "People talk about how T.S.O.L. changed so much from the first EP to Dance with Me", recalled Grisham, "from political punk to gothic punk. But we had all those songs before we did the first EP. If you look on the first EP cover, my hair's sticking straight up, I'm wearing some Frankenstein suit, and I've got black makeup all over my eyes."

== Reception and legacy ==
The EP's emotional sound and vicious attitude ensured T.S.O.L.'s standing as a major force in the southern California hardcore scene. According to Grisham, "the kids ate it up like candy, or cheap booze, and the shows grew in size." Steven Blush, author of American Hardcore: A Tribal History, writes that it was "lauded for its political conviction". In a retrospective review for Allmusic, Alex Henderson rated it four stars out of five. He remarked that the political stances of "Property Is Theft" and "Abolish Government / Silent Majority" seem opposing, representing two radically different schools of thought and making it unclear which ideology the band preferred. "What is clear", he said, "is that this record hits its mark musically even though its lyrics can be nebulous. Whatever you think of T.S.O.L.'s politics, this EP is an inspired and exhilarating slice of early '80s punk." Adam Bregman, reviewing Dance with Me, called the debut EP "exceptional".

== Re-releases ==
Following the EP's release, T.S.O.L. signed to Frontier Records for their full-length album Dance with Me. This caused a dispute with Posh Boy, who claimed the band had not honored their commitment to record a second EP for the label. Several years later, Posh Boy and the four original members of T.S.O.L. (Grisham and Barnes had left the band in 1983) worked out a settlement in which the band received back payments of royalties from the label, and Posh Boy purchased the master recordings and publishing rights to T.S.O.L.'s 1982 EP Weathered Statues, originally released through Alternative Tentacles. Posh Boy combined the two EPs to make the 1987 compilation album Thoughts of Yesterday: 1981–1982 (later re-released through Rhino Records). Nitro Records purchased the master tapes from Posh Boy in 1997, remastered them, and re-released the two EPs as the compilation T.S.O.L. / Weathered Statues. Of the Nitro release, Allmusic's Steve Huey remarked that it "showcases the group's pulverizing early sound".

== Track listing ==
All tracks are written by Jack Grisham, Ron Emory, Mike Roche, and Todd Barnes

Side A
No.	Title	Length
1.	"Superficial Love"	1:18
2.	"Property Is Theft"	1:25
3.	"No Way Out"	1:10

Side B
No.	Title	Length
1.	"Abolish Government / Silent Majority"	1:59
2.	"World War III"	1:45
Total length:		7:37

== Personnel ==
Band

- Jack Grisham – vocals (credited as Jack Greggors)
- Ron Emory – guitars
- Mike Roche – bass guitar
- Todd Barnes – drums (credited as Francis Gerald Barnes)

Production

- Robbie Fields – producer
- David Hines – recording engineer, mix engineer
- Stan Ross – mastering
- Edward Colver – cover photo
