= An American Demon =

Book by Jack Grisham

An American Demon: A Memoir
- Author: Jack Grisham
- Language: English
- Genre: Hysterical realism, Satire, Tragicomedy, Literary Fiction, Music
- Publisher: ECW Press
- Publication date: May 1, 2011
- Publication place: United States
- Media type: Print (paperback)
- Pages: 360 pp
- ISBN: 978-1-55022-956-1

An American Demon: A Memoir is a 2011 novel/memoir by Jack Grisham that mixes a detailed account of the author's life until the end of the 1980s with bits of philosophical fiction. The book deals with themes of religion, substance abuse, recovery programs, depression, child abuse, family relationships, punk rock, surfing, and cross dressing.

== Setting ==
This novel is based on the life of Jack Grisham, best known as the lead singer for the popular 1980s punk band T.S.O.L.

== Plot ==
The plot partially revolves around the author's life, but also delves into side topics such as religion and politics.

== Location ==
Grisham wrote the book while living in an office overlooking Huntington Beach, California. Reportedly the location was without any modern conveniences and as such was deemed an 'illegal' residence.
