= Live from Long Beach =

Live album by T.S.O.L.
- Released: October 13, 2008
- Recorded: November 25, 2006 at The Vault, Long Beach, California
- Genre: Hardcore punk
- Length: 77:54
- Label: Cider City (CIDEREYE08)
- Producer: Bob Emory

T.S.O.L. chronology
Who's Screwin' Who? (2005)	Live from Long Beach (2008)	Life, Liberty & the Pursuit of Free Downloads (2009)

Live from Long Beach is a live album by the American hardcore punk band T.S.O.L., released in 2008 through Cider City Records.

== Track listing ==
All tracks are written by Jack Grisham, Ron Emory, Mike Roche, and Todd Barnes, except where noted.

No.	Title	Length
1.	"See You Tomorrow" (Grisham, Emory)	2:36
2.	"Superficial Love"	1:12
3.	"Terrible People" (Grisham, Emory, Roche, Jay O'Brien)	2:02
4.	"Die for Me"	3:23
5.	"World War III"	1:45
6.	"Sounds of Laughter"	4:01
7.	"The Triangle"	4:17
8.	"Fuck You Tough Guy" (Grisham, Roche, Chris Higgins)	4:56
9.	"Socialite" (Grisham, Emory, Roche, O'Brien)	2:23
10.	"Dance with Me"	2:08
11.	"Man and Machine"	1:31
12.	"I'm Tired of Life"	3:02
13.	"Love Story"	3:58
14.	"Politics" (Brian James; originally performed by The Damned)	2:21
15.	"Beneath the Shadows" (Grisham, Emory, Roche, Barnes, Greg Kuehn)	4:02
16.	"In My Head" (Grisham, Emory, Roche, O'Brien)	5:25
17.	"Abolish Government / Silent Majority"	2:01
18.	"Sodomy" (Grisham, Emory, Roche, O'Brien)	3:34
19.	"Word Is"	4:00
20.	"Wash Away" (Grisham, Emory, Roche, Barnes, Kuehn)	3:58
21.	"Sex Not Violence" (Grisham, Emory)	3:37
22.	"Weathered Statues"	3:57
23.	"Funeral March"	2:27
24.	"Serious" (Grisham, Emory)	2:44
25.	"Code Blue"	2:34
Total length:		77:54

== Personnel ==
Band

- Jack Grisham – vocals
- Ron Emory – guitar; backing vocals; lead vocals on "Die for Me" and "In My Head"; co-lead vocals on "I'm Tired of Life"
- Mike Roche – bass guitar
- Anthony Biuso – drums
- Greg Kuehn – keyboards

Production

- Bob Emory – recording engineer, mix engineer
