= Lewis (musician) =

Canadian singer and musician

- Also known as: Lewis Baloue, Randy Duke
- Born: Randall A. Wulff
- Origin: Canada
- Instruments: Guitar, vocals
- Years active: 1980s–present
- Label: Light in the Attic

Randall A. Wulff, better known by his stage name Lewis, and also known as Lewis Baloue and Randy Duke, is a Canadian singer and musician. He released a number of albums in the 1980s, but did not become widely known until they were rereleased in 2014.

== Early and personal life ==
Lewis' family live in British Columbia but he is estranged from them; in August 2014 his brother stated that he had not seen Lewis since 2007. His father and uncle had lost touch with him some years previously. During the recording process of his 1980s albums Lewis worked as a stockbroker, and lived in Calgary. He lived with his girlfriend in an apartment with all-white furniture.

== Career ==
Lewis recorded two albums in 1983 and 1985 (L'Amour and Romantic Times) that were mostly forgotten until a record collector discovered L'Amour in an Edmonton flea market. They were both re-released by Seattle-based record label Light in the Attic in 2014.

L'Amour was recorded in Los Angeles in 1983. Lewis disappeared soon after the photoshoot by Edward Colver for the album cover, after his cheque to Colver bounced. Romantic Times was originally released in 1985 under the 'Lewis Baloue' pseudonym. An original copy of the album sold on eBay in 2014 for $2,000.

Two further albums - Love Ain't No Mystery (recorded under the 'Randy Duke' pseudonym) and Hawaiian Breeze were also released by different record labels in 2014 and 2015. Under a different pseudonym, Lewis is also believed to have recorded a number of "very soft, religious music" albums in Vancouver in the mid-2000s which were never released. In 2014 Lewis stated that he was continuing to perform music, but that he was not interested in his earlier releases.

In 2022, a short film concerning Lewis, entitled I Thought the World of You directed by Canadian filmmaker Kurt Walker, toured the film festival circuit and garnered praise: ″Walker’s film perfectly captures the hauntology of dollar-bin, vanity-pressing gold. He recreates the edges of Lewis’s life with a lush romanticism, following his white convertible down tree-lined highways, spying him through the window of his recording booth. All the while, Walker keeps Lewis turned away from the camera, reserving him a certain privacy.″

== Discography ==
Original release	Re-release	Title
1983	2014	L'Amour
1985	2014	Romantic Times
Unknown	2014	Love Ain't No Mystery
Unknown	2015	Hawaiian Breeze
