= Change Today? =

Studio album by T.S.O.L.
- Released: 1984
- Recorded: 1984 at Mad Dog Studio, Venice, California
- Genres: Punk rock, gothic rock, hardcore punk
- Length: 29:49
- Label: Enigma
- Producers: T.S.O.L., Chris Grayson

T.S.O.L. chronology
Beneath the Shadows (1983)	Change Today? (1984)	Revenge (1986)

Change Today? is the third studio album by the American rock band T.S.O.L. (True Sounds of Liberty), released in 1984 through Enigma Records. It was the band's first album with singer/guitarist Joe Wood and drummer Mitch Dean, replacing founding members Jack Grisham and Todd Barnes who had left the band in late 1983. The album was recorded using money loaned to T.S.O.L. by the Dead Kennedys, and found the new incarnation of the band moving away from the hardcore punk associations of the original lineup in favor of a traditional rock and gothic rock sound. Change Today? was reissued in 1999 through the Enigma subsidiary Restless Records, adding four tracks from the recording sessions that had been left off the original album.

== Background and recording ==
On their 1983 album Beneath the Shadows, T.S.O.L. had moved away from hardcore punk, adding keyboards to their lineup and shifting in a gothic rock direction in the vein of the Damned and Siouxsie and the Banshees. Though the album received positive reviews from critics, it was largely rejected by their hardcore fanbase. In late 1983 singer Jack Grisham, drummer Todd Barnes, and keyboardist Greg Kuehn all left the band. Grisham cited increased violence and police presence at shows, as well as audiences looking to him for instruction, as factors in his departure.

Guitarist Ron Emory and bassist Mike Roche continued on as T.S.O.L., assembling a new lineup in February 1984 that included drummer Mitch Dean, formerly of the Joneses, and singer/guitarist Joe Wood (Wood later married Grisham's sister). The Dead Kennedys loaned the group their van to tour the United States. They began to write new material that reflected the growing British gothic rock genre they admired, coming up with 20–30 songs. However, they faced a lack of interest from record labels in financing a recording session. The Dead Kennedys again assisted the band, loaning them money for studio time.

Over the course of four nights at Mad Dog Studio in Venice, California T.S.O.L. recorded their new songs with recording engineer Stuart Schanwetter and producer Chris Grayson. The tracks were mastered by Eddy Schreyer, and the band chose ten to comprise Change Today?, which was picked up for release by Enigma Records. The group toured constantly in the two months leading up to its release, playing nine of the album's ten songs in their set. "We would leave out 'Flowers by the Door'", recalled Dean, "because we thought it was weak and it just barely made it onto the album. Once the record was released it became the most popular song from Change Today?, which goes to show that sometimes the artists are too close to the music and basically don't know shit." They continued to tour in support of the album for almost two years on small budgets, making US$5–25 a night and staying at friends' houses or packing the entire band and crew into a single hotel room.

== Reception ==
Bradley Torreano of Allmusic remarks that Change Today? had "a different flair than the group had in the past. The guitars were gloomier and more focused, while Wood's melodramatic croon sharpened the whole affair into a unique L.A. goth sound." Allmusic's Robert Gabriel gave the album three stars out of five, saying that it "marked quite a stylistic twist for the band. Known up to that time as a hardcore punk outfit, T.S.O.L. suddenly became much more of a traditional rock group with more in common with the Doors than the Damned. All things considered, Change Today? is actually a fine album, most notable for its inspired songwriting and driving guitars."

== Reissue ==
Change Today? was remastered and reissued in 1999 through the Enigma subsidiary Restless Records. Eddy Schreyer, who mastered the album originally, performed the remastering, while Chuck Kelley served as producer. In addition to retrospective liner notes written by Wood and Dean, the reissue added four bonus tracks that had been recorded during the album sessions but had not made the cut for the record. "Otherside" was originally released on the 1984 compilation album Blazing Wheels and Barking Trucks: Skate Rock Vol. 2 put out by Thrasher magazine. Dean remarked that he "always thought it kicked ass and should have been included in the original package." A cover version of the West Coast Pop Art Experimental Band's "Suppose They Give a War and No One Comes" originally appeared on the compilation Flipside Vinyl Fanzine Volume 1 (1984) released by Flipside magazine. "Road of Gold" was re-recorded for the band's 1987 album Hit and Run. "This Is Your Life" was also re-recorded for an EP that was never released.

== Track listing ==
All tracks are written by Joe Wood, Ron Emory, Mike Roche, and Mitch Dean, except where noted

Side A
No.	Title	Length
1.	"Blackmagic"	2:34
2.	"Just Like Me"	2:43
3.	"In Time"	2:12
4.	"Red Shadows"	3:46
5.	"Flowers by the Door"	3:03

Side B
No.	Title	Length
1.	"American Zone"	2:48
2.	"It's Gray"	4:15
3.	"John"	2:32
4.	"Nice Guys"	1:46
5.	"How Do"	4:10
Total length:		29:49

1999 reissue bonus tracks
No.	Title	Length
11.	"Road of Gold"	3:01
12.	"Otherside" (from Blazing Wheels and Barking Trucks: Skate Rock Vol. 2, 1984)	2:45
13.	"Suppose They Give a War and No One Comes" (Roger Bryant, Bob Markley; originally performed by the West Coast Pop Art Experimental Band; from Flipside Vinyl Fanzine Volume 1, 1984)	3:40
14.	"This Is Your Life"	2:56
Total length:		42:11

== Personnel ==
Band

- Joe Wood – lead vocals, guitar
- Ron Emory – guitar; lead vocals on "In Time" and "How Do"
- Mike Roche – bass guitar
- Mitch Dean – drums

Production

- Chris Grayson – producer
- Stuart Schanwetter – recording engineer
- Eddy Schreyer – mastering, remastering of 1999 reissue
- Mofo – back cover photo
- Rhoda Rhonstock – photography
- Chuck Kelley – producer of 1999 reissue
