= Disappear (album) =

Studio album by T.S.O.L.
- Released: June 26, 2001
- Recorded: 2001 at Track Record, North Hollywood, Los Angeles
- Length: 29:28
- Label: Nitro (15838)
- Producer: Thom Wilson

T.S.O.L. chronology
Hell and Back Together: 1984–1990 (1992)	Disappear (2001)	Divided We Stand (2003)

Professional ratings
Review scores
Source	Rating
AllMusic	4/5 stars
Drowned in Sound	5/10
The Encyclopedia of Popular Music	3/5 stars

Disappear is a studio album by the American hardcore punk band T.S.O.L., released in 2001 through Nitro Records.

== Critical reception ==
The Los Angeles Times called the album a return to "a classic punk sound full of high-octane, slashing guitars." AllMusic wrote that "the album may be titled Disappear, but TSOL have in reality reappeared in all its former glory." Trouser Press called the band "as stylistically ravenous as ever," but wrote that the album contained "too much filler from a band that’s had so long to prepare."

== Track listing ==
All tracks are written by Jack Grisham, Ron Emory, Mike Roche, and Jay O'Brien.

No.	Title	Length
1.	"Motivate"	0:51
2.	"Sodomy"	1:44
3.	"Crybaby"	1:54
4.	"Anticop"	1:49
5.	"Terrible People"	2:01
6.	"Pyro"	2:24
7.	"In My Head"	2:29
8.	"Renounce"	2:35
9.	"Socialite"	2:19
10.	"Wasted"	1:51
11.	"Automatic"	2:45
12.	"Paranoid"	3:41
13.	"Disappear"	3:05
Total length:		29:28

== Personnel ==
Band

- Jack Grisham – vocals, piano
- Ron Emory – guitar; lead vocals on "In My Head"
- Mike Roche – bass guitar
- Jay O'Brien – drums

Additional musicians

- Pat O'Leary – backing vocals on "In My Head"
- Alan Morphew – trumpet on "Socialite"

Production

- Thom Wilson – producer, recording engineer
- Kris Stencel – layout and design
