= Divided We Stand (album) =

Studio album by T.S.O.L.
- Released: September 9, 2003
- Recorded: 2003 at Mad Dog Studios, Burbank, California
- Genre: Hardcore punk
- Length: 35:46
- Label: Nitro (15854)
- Producer: David Bianco

T.S.O.L. chronology
Disappear (2001)	Divided We Stand (2003)	Life, Liberty & the Pursuit of Free Downloads (2009)

Professional ratings
Review scores
Source	Rating
AllMusic	3.5/5 stars

Divided We Stand is a studio album by the American hardcore punk band T.S.O.L. It was released in 2003 through Nitro Records.

The album was released concurrently with Jack Grisham's campaign for the California governorship.

== Critical reception ==
The Houston Press wrote that the album "mixed trademark vitriol into an adult brew lacking none of [the band's] intelligence and intransigence."

== Track listing ==
All tracks are written by Jack Grisham and Ron Emory, except where noted

No.	Title	Length
1.	"Sedatives" (Grisham, Mike Roche, Chris Higgins)	2:25
2.	"Serious"	2:12
3.	"Fuck You Tough Guy" (Grisham, Roche, Higgins)	2:55
4.	"See You Tomorrow"	3:15
5.	"American"	2:56
6.	"Loaded"	3:38
7.	"Sex Not Violence"	2:44
8.	"Again" (Grisham, Roche)	2:17
9.	"Electric" (Grisham, Roche, Higgins)	2:34
10.	"Undressed" (Grisham, Roche)	3:01
11.	"Being in Love"	2:28
12.	"Happy"	2:16
13.	"Shine" (Grisham, Emory, Roche, Greg Kuehn)	3:05
Total length:		35:46

== Personnel ==
Band

- Jack Grisham – vocals
- Ron Emory – guitars, backing vocals
- Mike Roche – bass guitar
- Billy Blaze – drums

Additional musicians

- Greg Kuehn – piano, synthesizer, backing vocals
- Elvis Kuehn – backing vocals
- Bradley Ball – backing vocals
- Chris "X-13" Higgins – backing vocals
- "Angry John" – backing vocals

Production

- David Bianco – producer, recording engineer, mix engineer, percussion, guitar
- Rafael Serrano – second engineer, Pro Tools, backing vocals
- Bill Scoville – layout and design
