= Joe Wood (musician) =

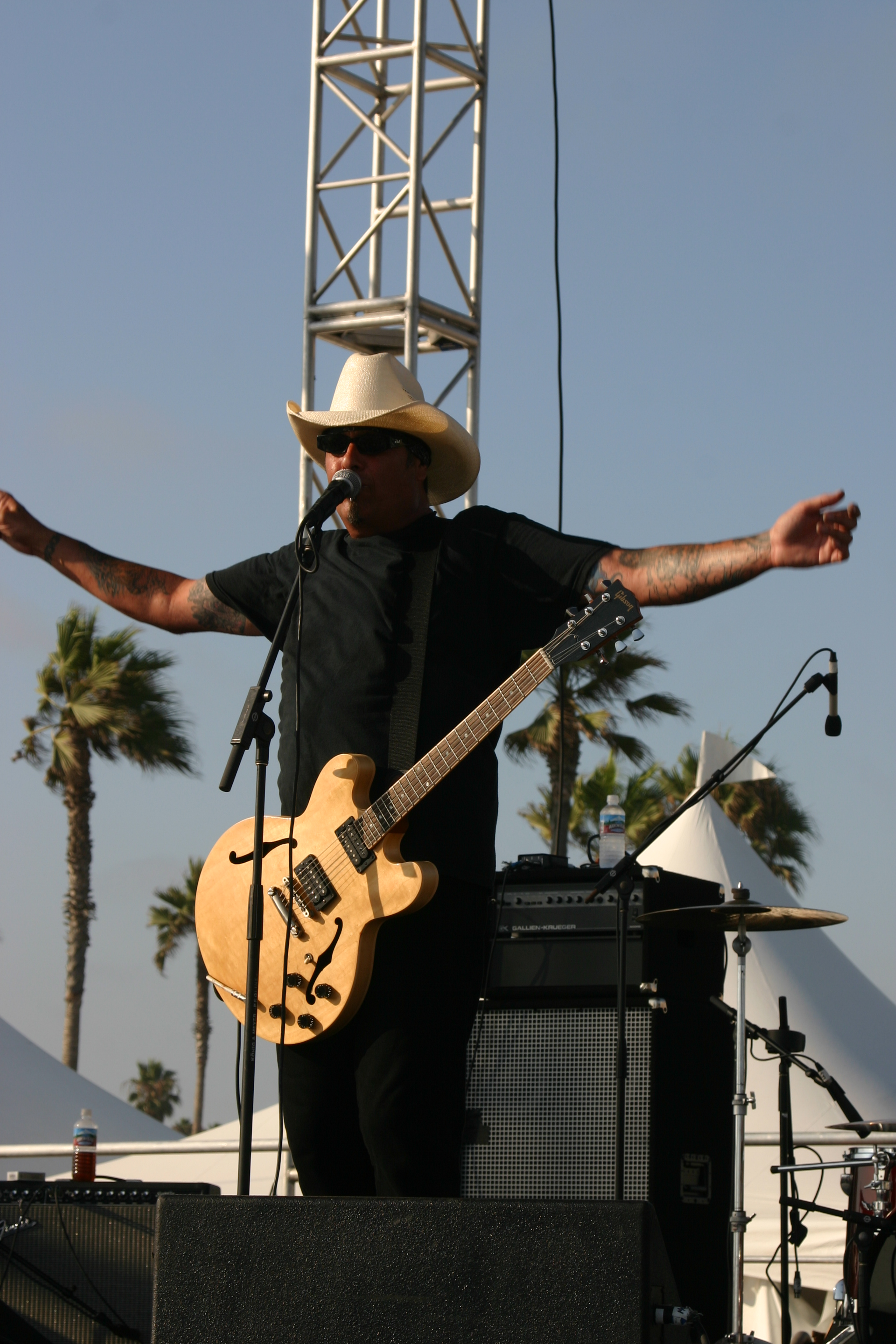

Background information
- Genres: Punk rock; blues rock; glam metal
- Occupations: Musician; songwriter
- Instruments: Vocals; guitar; bass
- Years active: 1979–present

Joe Wood is an American singer/songwriter, best known as the singer for T.S.O.L. from 1983 to 1993.

== Early life ==
Joe Wood was born in Long Beach, Ca. on Nov 28th 1960. From an early age he was surrounded by gospel music and country music on his dad's Roland Boyd Wood side and traditional Italian from his mom Theresa Saracino.

He has two siblings: Tony J Wood and Maria Wood

He started playing guitar at 16. In 1977 Joe went to his first punk show to see the germs at the Masque.

== Career ==
=== Der Stab, The Hated, The Loners ===
After seeing The Germs at the Masque, Wood formed his own band, Der Stab for which he played for about six to eight months, he would later play bass in The Hated, and later formed The Loners, a blues rockabilly band.

=== True Sounds of Liberty (T.S.O.L.) ===
In 1983, T.S.O.L. had broken up after vocalist Jack Grisham, keyboardist Greg Kuehn, and drummer Todd Barnes had quit the group amidst personal turmoil, guitarist Ron Emory had started playing with Wood in The Loners, he had asked Wood to start a new band with him and Mike Roche, joined by drummer Mitch Dean they chose to tour and record under the T.S.O.L. name.

=== Orange Wedge, Big Deluxe ===
In 1992, Wood formed a side project called Orange Wedge with Mitch Dean, Dave Mello, Dean Chamberlain, and Mike Dewey. Wood called this the best band experience

In 1997, Wood formed a band that played traditional blues called Big Deluxe, the group made an appearance in the 1998 film Pariah, in which Wood also plays a parent to one of the main characters.

== Discography ==
=== Singles ===
- For What It's Worth/Red, White, And Blue (1991, Triple X Records)

=== With The Hated ===
- Innocent People/Seize The Middle East (1981, Stress Records)
- Pressure/Stereotyped (1982, Stress Records)

=== With T.S.O.L. ===
- Change Today? (1984, Enigma Records)
- Revenge (1986, Enigma Records)
- Hit and Run (1987, Enigma Records)
- Strange Love (1990, Enigma Records)

=== Compilations ===
- Hell and Back Together: 1984–1990 (1992, Restless Records)

Compilation appearances

- Flipside Vinyl Fanzine Vol. 1 (Song: "Suppose They Gave A War...") (1984, Gasatanka Records)
- Blazing Wheels And Barking Trucks - Skate Rock Vol. 2 (Song: "Other Side", "In Time") (1984, Thrasher Magazine)
- The Enigma Variations (Song: "Flowers by the Door") (1985, Enigma Records)
- The Return of the Living Dead Soundtrack (Song: "Nothing For You") (1985, Enigma Records)
- Dangerously Close - Original Motion Picture Soundtrack (Song: "Change Today?") (1986, Enigma Records)
- Paranoia You Can Dance To (Song: "Suppose They Gave A War...") (1986, Weird System)
- 89 FM Internacional (Song: "Flowers by the Door") (1986, Young)
- Under Cover (Original Motion Picture Soundtrack) (Song: "Revenge") (1987, Enigma Records)
- Music To Keep You Up All Night/Music You'll Respect In The Morning (Song: "The Name Is Love") (1987, Enigma Records/Restless Records)
- The Enigma Variations 2 (Song: "Colors (Take Me Away)") (1987, Enigma Records)
- Heavy Metal Machine - Pull One (Song: "Hit And Run") (1987, Medusa Records)
- Scream (The Compilation) (Song: "All Along The Watchtower") (1987, Geffen Records)
- The Album Network CD Tune Up #3 (Song: "The Name Is Love") (1987, The Album Network)
- Sound. And Vision. Volume Two (Song: "Strange Love") (1989, Enigma Records)
- Levi's Presents Rockin' On Campus (Song: "White Lightning") (1990, Score Productions, Inc.)
- Tune-Master (Song: "Strange Love") (1990, Enigma Records)
- Turn It Up & Pass It On - Volume 2 (Song: "Hell On Earth") (1990, AIM Marketing)
- Restless Catalog Sampler (Song: "Strange Love") (1992, Restless Records)
- The Best Of Flipside Vinyl Fanzines (Song: "Suppose They Gave A War...") (1993, Flipside Records/Gasatanka Records)
- Yamaiko (Songs: "Flowers By The Door", "No Time") (1994, Toy's Factory)
- 89 A Revista Rock N°3 (Songs: "Flowers By The Door") (1998)
- Restless Sampler (Song: "Flowers By The Door") (2003, Restless Records)
- Enigma Promo N.01 (Song "It's Too Late") (Enigma Records)
- Vida Sobre Rodas (Song: "Flowers By The Door") (2010, EMI)

=== With Cisco Poison ===
- It's A Long Way To Heaven... (1994, Doctor Dream Records)

Compilation appearances

- Santa And Satan: One And The Same? (Song: "Silent Night") (1994, Doctor Dream Records)
- Rock Tune Up 130 (Song "Gun in My Mouth") (1995, The Album Network)
- My Recommendation Is... (Songs: "Everything I See", "26 Forever", "Silent Night")

=== With The Lonely Ones ===
- The Lonely Ones (2000)
- Blues Out of Long Beach, CA (2006)

=== With Change Today ===
- I Am (2023, Not Like You Records)
