= Revenge (T.S.O.L. album) =

- Left to right on the cover: Ron Emory, Joe Wood, Mike Roche, and Mitch Dean

Studio album by T.S.O.L.
- Released: June 20, 1986
- Recorded: 1986 at Music Grinder Studios, Hollywood
- Genre: Hard rock, punk rock
- Length: 31:43
- Label: Enigma (73211)
- Producer: Howard Benson

T.S.O.L. chronology
Change Today? (1984)	Revenge (1986)	Hit and Run (1987)

Revenge is the fourth studio album by the American rock band T.S.O.L. (True Sounds of Liberty), released in 1986 through Enigma Records. With increased exposure brought on by continuous touring, and influenced by the growing hard rock scene in their native Southern California, the band moved away from the punk- and gothic rock-influenced sound of their past in favor of simpler rock numbers. To promote the album, two songs were used in film soundtracks: "Nothin' for You" in The Return of the Living Dead (1985) and "Revenge" in Dangerously Close (1986). "Revenge" and "Colors (Take Me Away)" were also made into the band's first music videos.

== Background and recording ==
T.S.O.L. toured for almost two years in support of their 1984 album Change Today?, becoming quite popular in their home region of Southern California. With this increased exposure, their music, which had been rooted in punk rock and gothic rock, began to take on elements of the area's growing hard rock scene. However, singer/guitarist Joe Wood insisted that "no matter how much the music changes, our roots are still punk because we never played any instruments before punk." The band recorded Revenge at Music Grinder Studios in Hollywood with producer Howard Benson and recording engineer Ron Goudie. Several additional engineers assisted in the recording, and the tracks were mixed by Benson.

Revenge was released by June 20, 1986, by Enigma Records (catalog number 73211), under a new nationwide distribution deal between Enigma and Capitol Records. Prior to the album's release, the song "Nothin' for You" was used in the soundtrack for the 1985 horror film The Return of the Living Dead. The album's title track was included in the film Dangerously Close, and a music video was filmed that included scenes from the movie. A second music video was filmed for the song "Colors (Take Me Away)".

== Reception ==
Prior to the album's release, Randy Lewis of the Los Angeles Times predicted that it could give T.S.O.L. their shot at radio airplay: "Even more than its predecessor—1984's Change Today? LP—Revenge is a driving, often provocative work that shows the group's musical base extending beyond mere punk thrash. Although a couple of up-tempo tunes prove that the band can still muster blasts of raw punk power, [Ron] Emory's blazing guitar work and the raging, Jim Morrison-like intensity of Wood's vocals on 'No Time' and 'Memories' would fit comfortably alongside hard rock and heavy metal on album rock stations." Bradley Torreano of Allmusic remarked that with Revenge, "a general poppiness began to creep into [T.S.O.L.'s] sound that was more along the lines of the hard rock scene that was growing around them. Still, excellent tracks such as 'Nothin' for You' still displayed an edgy obsession with dark sounds and moods."

Allmusic's Robert Gabriel gave the album two stars out of five in a retrospective review, criticizing the hard rock direction the band took: "T.S.O.L. was barely hanging on to the last strands of its punk rock past. [Their] sound began to resemble the morbid cock rock of groups such as Alice Cooper and Danzig much more than the sarcastic resistance rock of California counterparts such as the Circle Jerks and the Dead Kennedys." He remarked that, despite the presence of a few fast-paced songs, the more hard rock-oriented tracks on the album "continued the trend toward rock simplicity. Revenge is really not much more than a record aimed to appease the juvenile mind."

== Track listing ==
All tracks are written by Joe Wood, Ron Emory, Mike Roche, and Mitch Dean.

No.	Title	Length
1.	"No Time"	2:36
2.	"Nothin' for You"	2:28
3.	"Memories"	3:07
4.	"Colors (Take Me Away)"	4:10
5.	"Madhouse"	3:53
6.	"Revenge"	3:07
7.	"Change Today"	2:17
8.	"Still the Same"	3:48
9.	"Your Eyes"	3:43
10.	"Everybody's a Cop"	2:34
Total length:		31:43

== Personnel ==
Band

- Joe Wood – vocals, guitar
- Ron Emory – guitar
- Mike Roche – bass guitar
- Mitch Dean – drums

Production

- Howard Benson – producer, mix engineer
- Ron Goudie – recording engineer
- Randy Burns – recording engineer
- Chris Grayson – recording engineer ("Nothin' for You" and "Everybody's a Cop")
- Robert Feist – recording engineer ("Nothin' for You" and "Everybody's a Cop")
- Jeff Woodruff – additional engineering, mix engineer
- Mike Kloster – additional second engineering
- Scarpati – photography
