= Chip Hanna =

American drummer

Chip Hanna (born 1965 in Baton Rouge, Louisiana) was the drummer of U.S. Bombs and One Man Army. He now plays drums for the U.S. Bombs occasionally. Chip also sang lead vocals and played snare drum for Busted Hearts out of Phoenix, Arizona.

Hanna currently has a project called Chip Hanna & The Berlin Three, which is a country/western/rockabilly/psychobilly/bluegrass band based out of Kreuzberg, Berlin, Germany. He plays guitar and sings lead. The project's first LP, Chip Hanna & The Berlin Three, was released in April 2007 on People Like You Records in Germany. Their second LP, Old South Jamboree, was released on February 1, 2008, on PLY. The Berlin Three are Andy Laaf drums, Tex Morton guitar/lap steel, and Valle bass fiddle; they are well known in the rockabilly/psychobilly-scene as members of Mad Sin. They currently play and tour every few months in Germany and western Europe.

In 2016, he joined T.S.O.L.,

Chip Hanna also performs solo and did two European tours in 2005 and 2006, the last one supporting The Real McKenzies and The Briggs on the Muttis Little Monsters tour.
