= Marshall Rohner =

- Born: Marshall Lambert Rohner; December 20, 1963; Iowa
- Died: October 18, 2005 (aged 41) Yucca Valley, California, U.S.
- Genres: Blues metal, blues
- Occupation: Musician
- Instrument: Guitar
- Years active: 1970s-2005

Marshall Lambert Rohner (December 20, 1963, in Iowa – October 18, 2005, in Yucca Valley, California) was an American guitarist whose credits include: T.S.O.L., The Cruzados, Jimmy and The Mustangs, Kenny Brown and Dino's Revenge.

Rohner appeared in several videos in the early MTV days including "Live at the Ritz" with the Cruzados, E.G. Daily's "Is Anybody Home" (after which both became romantically linked), and the 1980s sitcom Square Pegs.

Rohner was born in Iowa to Barbara Flaig and Lambert Rohner. However, Rohner spent most of his life in southern California.

His film credits include Road House. He was also featured in Voyage of the Rock Aliens starring Pia Zadora where he played "Dino" which is believed to be the origin of his band's name "Dino's Revenge". Dino's Revenge included the blues guitarist Hollywood Fats, Kevan Hill (The Twisters), Butch Acevedo (L.T.D., Tina Turner) and Steven Ameche (Philip Bailey).

He was known to keep a picture of his two children, Leo Marshall Rohner Baker and Marshall Leo Rohner, taped to the back of his amplifier during performances.

In the 1980s Rohner began experimenting with intravenous drugs. Rohner's drug use led him to several arrests, imprisonment and eventually AIDS. Rohner died on October 18, 2005, of AIDS-related causes in Yucca Valley, California, where he had lived for ten years.
