= American Hardcore: A Tribal History =

Book by Steven Blush

- Second edition cover (2010).
- Editor: George Petros
- Author: Steven Blush
- Cover artist: Edward Colver
- Language: English
- Subject: American hardcore punk movement (1980-1986)
- Publisher: Feral House
- Publication date: October 2001
- Publication place: United States
- Pages: 333
- ISBN: 0-922915-71-7
- OCLC: 48658495

American Hardcore: A Tribal History is a book written by Steven Blush that relates the history of the hardcore punk movement in Northern America between 1980 and 1986. It was first published by Feral House in 2001, receiving an updated and expanded edition in 2010. It was edited by George Petros. The book was the basis of the documentary film American Hardcore (2006), directed by Paul Rachman.

== Background and publication history ==
American Hardcore: A Tribal History was written by journalist Steven Blush, previously a band manager and music promoter; to write the book, he conducted over 150 interviews. In interviews, he described the project as an attempt to document a period he felt was overlooked in mainstream rock histories. The book was edited and designed by George Petros. Itwas first published by Feral House in 2001. Feral House released an extended second edition on November 1, 2010. The original book was 333 pages, and the revised edition 408.

The book cover features a colorized version by Eric Hammer of a black-and-white photograph, taken by Edward Colver, portraying Danny Spira, lead singer of Los Angeles hardcore punk band Wasted Youth, performing in 1981 at Godzilla's, a former bowling alley, nightclub, and music venue in Sun Valley, California. (Note: Blush [2001] 2010, p. 8)

== Contents ==
The book attempts to profile the North American hardcore movement from the early to mid 1980s. Individual chapters focus on specific bands, as well as specific cities and the punk movement there. It also includes the logos of many of the bands, song lyrics, artwork, and a discography of hardcore music.

The 2010 edition is heavily updated from the first, with a new chapter titled "Destroy Babylon", which explores the mutant forms of spirituality that came from the movement, and interviewed over twenty-five new subjects. Blush also has unearthed many new pieces of art, drafted two hundred plus new band bios, and featured an expanded discography. He also offered a new conclusion. The new edition is, according to the author, less critical.

== Adaptions ==
The book was the basis of the documentary film American Hardcore (2006), directed by Paul Rachman. The film premiered at the 2006 Sundance Film Festival and later screened at the Toronto International Film Festival.

== Reception ==
Curtz Schultz of The Oregonian praised it as a "deftly authoritative work", "frank, unsentimental, and crammed with anecdotes", praising it for its information on a nearly forgotten era. Journalist Joe S. Harrington was more critical, writing that Blush's arguments were unconvincing and relied "too much on bravado". Punknews.org wrote that the book attempted to cover scenes across the United States, The A.V. Club described it as "absolutely essential reading".

In a review of the updated 2010 edition, Carol Cooper writing for The Village Voice described the book as "a big, sloppy banquet of a book", complimenting Blush's approach to the material, which she said never let the material "devolve into self-serving autobiography", "a juicier, more satisfying record of this particular cultural moment than professional critics or academics ever could". Greg Barbrick, reviewing the 2010 edition, called it the "definitive word" on hardcore music, and far superior to the first edition.
