= Life, Liberty & the Pursuit of Free Downloads =

Studio album by T.S.O.L.
- Released: January 8, 2009
- Recorded: December 17–24, 2008, at Hurley Studios, California
- Genre: Punk rock
- Length: 29:39
- Label: Hurley
- Producer: David Bianco

T.S.O.L. chronology
Divided We Stand (2003)	Life, Liberty & the Pursuit of Free Downloads (2009)	The Trigger Complex (2017)

Professional ratings
Review scores
Source	Rating
AllMusic	4/5 stars
Punknews.org	3.5/5 stars

Life, Liberty & the Pursuit of Free Downloads is a studio album by American punk rock band T.S.O.L. released in 2009 to coincide with the band's thirtieth anniversary. The album was released for free as a download through Hurley; Hurley's website hosted video of the band recording the album. The band asked that fans consider donating to charity the money that they would have spent on purchasing the album.

== Production ==
Hurley funded the production of the album. It built a studio in one of its warehouses, where the band recorded in December 2008.

== Critical reception ==
AllMusic wrote that "the key weapon [is] busy keyboardist Greg Kuehn, [who] floors yet again, working off Ron Emory's spider web of neo-psych guitars, while extroverted Jack Grisham remains uniquely charismatic, even when not dominating a stage".

== Track listing ==
1. "Come Into My Nightmare" – 3:26
2. "She's Got a Bomb" – 2:17
3. "Modern Girl" – 3:00
4. "The Pain That We Go Through" – 3:07
5. "We're Together" – 2:45
6. "Go to Bed Sleepy" – 3:19
7. "Love That Mess" – 2:24
8. "Wait For Me" – 3:00
9. "What Stephanie Wants" – 3:19
10. "Someone Like You" – 3:02

== Personnel ==
- Ron Emory – guitars
- Mike Roche – bass
- Greg Kuehn – keys
- Jack Grisham – vocals
- Anthony "Tiny" Biuso (Tiny Bubs) – drums
