= Hit and Run (T.S.O.L. album) =

- Left to right on the cover: Mike Roche, Mitch Dean, Joe Wood, and Ron Emory. One critic called the photographs, which showed off the band's new glam metal persona, "forced and awkward."

Studio album by T.S.O.L.
- Released: July 11, 1987
- Recorded: 1987 at Music Grinder Studios and Preferred Sound Studios, Hollywood
- Genre: Glam metal
- Length: 41:08
- Label: Enigma (73263)
- Producer: Howard Benson

T.S.O.L. chronology
Revenge (1986)	Hit and Run (1987)	Thoughts of Yesterday: 1981–1982 (1987)

Hit and Run is the fifth studio album by the American rock band T.S.O.L. (True Sounds of Liberty), released in 1987 through Enigma Records. It marked a stylistic shift for the band, who departed from their earlier gothic rock and hard rock efforts in favor of a glam metal persona and sound. Hit and Run was T.S.O.L.'s only release to chart, reaching no. 184 on the Billboard 200, but the band's new direction alienated their fans in vast numbers and was criticized by reviewers. Enigma found the album difficult to market due to the group's change in musical style and image. It failed to be the commercial breakthrough the members had hoped for, and T.S.O.L. left Enigma as a result.

== Background and recording ==
On their 1986 album Revenge, T.S.O.L. had begun to move away from the punk- and gothic rock-influenced sound of their past in favor of simpler rock numbers influenced by the growing hard rock scene in their native Southern California. Hit and Run was an even further departure, as they adopted a look and sound reflecting the popular glam metal of the era. The album was recorded at Music Grinder Studios and Preferred Sound Studios in Hollywood with recording engineer Jim Faraci and Revenge producer Howard Benson. It includes a cover version of "Good Mornin' Blues', originally performed by the 1930s/1940s blues artist Lead Belly, which features additional instrumentation in the form of saxophone, congas, and harmonica. The song "You Can Try" was dedicated to guitarist Ron Emory's brother William, who died of a heroin overdose in 1986 at age 29.

Hit and Run was released July 11, 1987 through Enigma Records (catalog number 73263), and T.S.O.L. supported it by touring with the Red Hot Chili Peppers and Guns N' Roses. They became friends with Guns N' Roses, whose were rising to stardom on the success of their platinum-selling debut album Appetite for Destruction, released ten days after Hit and Run. T.S.O.L.'s opening spot on their tour dates, coupled with Guns N' Roses drummer Steven Adler wearing a T.S.O.L. T-shirt in the music video for "Sweet Child o' Mine", brought T.S.O.L. increased attention: "I hear more people telling me about seeing our T-shirt every day than anything else we've ever done", said bassist Mike Roche in 1988.

== Reception ==
Hit and Run became T.S.O.L.'s only release to chart, reaching no. 184 on the Billboard 200. In the album's liner notes, the band members called it "the best record we have done to date. It is in keeping with our ideal of complete freedom in music, as in life itself." Mike Boehm of the Los Angeles Times wrote in 1988 that it "served final notice that the band no longer was playing punk rock. It was a polished, accessible record that consisted mostly of the sort of mainstream, melodic heavy rock that has brought big-time success to bands such as Guns N' Roses and the resurgent Aerosmith." In the fall of 1987 T.S.O.L. travelled to New York City for a showcase concert for representatives from major record labels, hoping to land a major-label deal. No deal came through, a setback that singer/guitarist Joe Wood attributed partly to his problems with drugs and alcohol.

The band's shift to glam metal alienated their fans in vast numbers. Enigma Records found Hit and Run difficult to market because T.S.O.L.'s past image as a punk band conflicted with their attempt to break into the heavy rock mainstream: Their core audience was confused, while heavy metal audiences failed to pick up on the album. "The people who make rock bands happen see us as that punk band of yesterday", said Roche, "Our problem now is educating them that we're not a hard-core band or any kind of punk band." Hit and Run failed to be the commercial breakthrough the band hoped for: "I thought we'd done it," Roche bemoaned, "It was diverse, it was powerful, and it could be played on the radio and sound good. When it didn't [succeed]... I'm used to that kind of thing. It was time to reassess and move on." As a result, T.S.O.L. left Enigma in "an amicable split", feeling the label viewed them as a band with a cult following but without chart-topping potential.

Bradley Torreano and Victor Valdivia of Allmusic were both critical of the album. Torreano called it "a sudden departure for the group, seeing them adopt a persona that was in tune with bands such as Poison and Faster Pussycat. This was not only evident in the forced and awkward pictures adorning the album, but more unfortunately in their sound as well." He cited Hit and Run as evidence of creative divisions within the band, remarking that founding members Emory and Roche "were clearly uncomfortable with this new direction and their contributions began to suffer because of it." On the other side of the divide were Wood and drummer Mitch Dean, who had joined in 1984. Torreano commented that the album's supporting tours "only emphasized the dual personalities the band had developed during this period."

Valdivia gave the album two stars out of five, saying "Musically, Hit and Run would fit in comfortably with The Cult's Electric (which is fitting since The Cult underwent a similar transformation) or Guns N' Roses' Appetite for Destruction, a rather odd fit from a band that was earlier compared to Bad Religion and even the Dead Kennedys. Unfortunately, T.S.O.L. lacks the clever songwriting, outstanding personality, and superior production that those two albums had." Though he noted some standout moments, he found them "few and far between. Too much of this is generic, run-of-the-mill hard rock, without any distinction."

== Track listing ==
All tracks are written by Joe Wood, Ron Emory, Mike Roche, and Mitch Dean, except where noted

No.	Title	Length
1.	"It's Too Late"	3:26
2.	"Road of Gold"	3:17
3.	"The Name Is Love"	3:10
4.	"Dreamer"	3:51
5.	"Good Mornin' Blues" (Hudie "Lead Belly" Ledbetter, Alan Lomax; originally performed by Lead Belly)	4:24
6.	"Hit and Run"	3:33
7.	"Not Alone Anymore"	4:06
8.	"Sixteen"	3:59
9.	"Stay with Me"	3:27
10.	"Where Did I Go Wrong"	4:52
11.	"You Can Try"	3:03
Total length:		41:08

== Personnel ==
Band

- Joe Wood – vocals, guitar
- Ron Emory – guitar
- Mike Roche – bass guitar
- Mitch Dean – drums

Additional musicians

- Jamie Segel – backing vocals
- Andy Landis – backing vocals
- Bill Bergman – saxophone on "Good Mornin' Blues"
- Andrea Carol – congas on "Good Mornin' Blues"

Production

- Howard Benson – producer, mix engineer, keyboards
- Jim Faraci – recording engineer, mix engineer, backing vocals
- Matt Freeman – assistant engineer
- Scott Campbell – assistant engineer
- Jeff DeMorris – assistant engineer
- Brian Ayuso – art direction, design
- Neil Zlozower – photography
