= T.S.O.L. =

American punk rock band

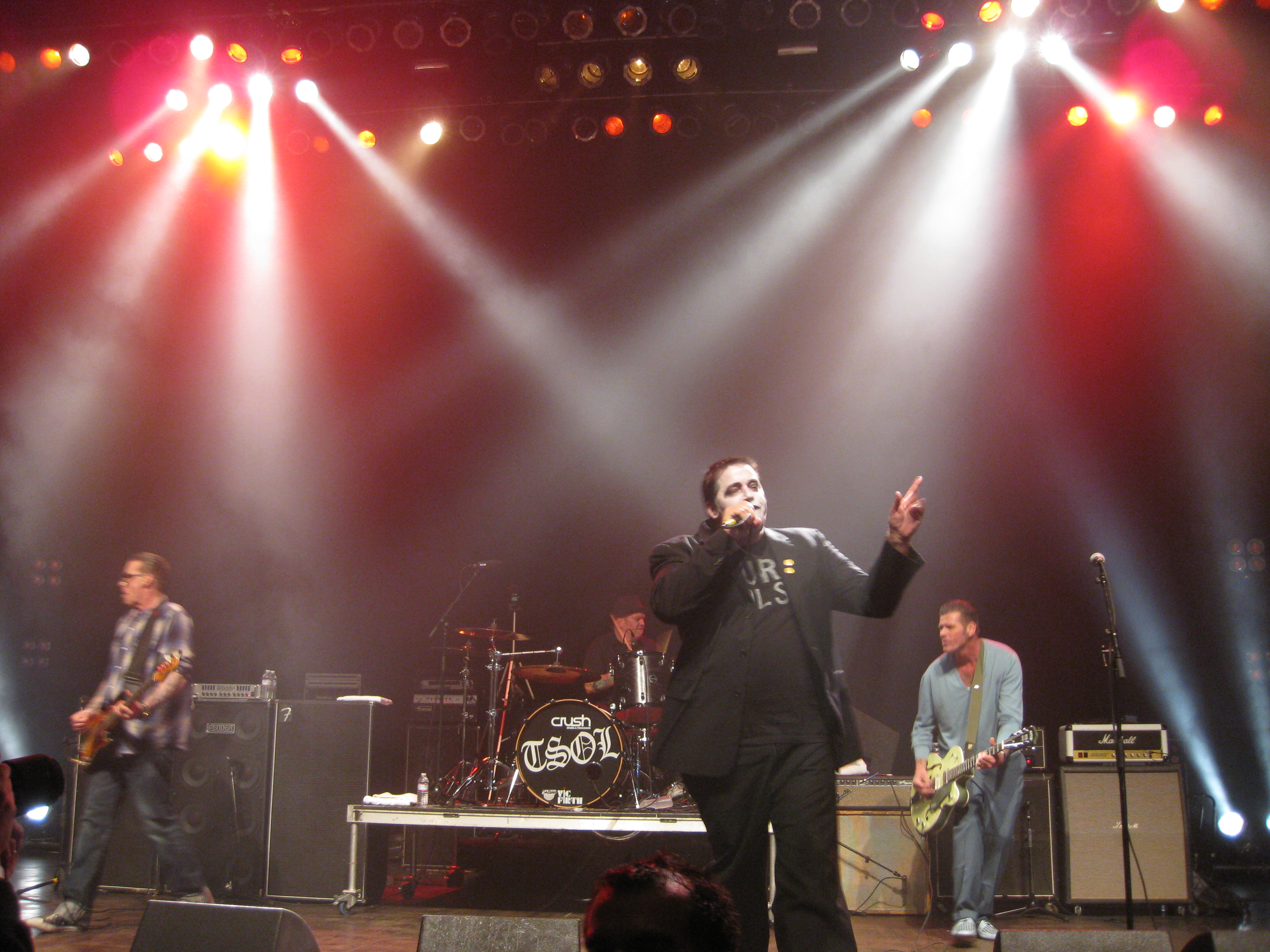
- Left to right: Roche, Biuso, Grisham and Emory in 2011

Background information
- Origin: Huntington Beach, California, U.S.
- Genres: Punk rock; hardcore punk; horror punk; gothic rock; deathrock; hard rock; glam metal
- Years active: 1978–1992; 1997-2006; 2007–2026
- Labels: Posh Boy; Frontier; Alternative Tentacles; Enigma; Restless; Triple X; Nitro; Anarchy; Cleopatra; Hurley International; DC-Jam; TKO; Rise
- Past members: Jack Grisham; Ron Emory; Mike Roche; Todd Barnes; Greg Kuehn; (see § Band members for others)

T.S.O.L. (True Sounds of Liberty) were an American punk rock band formed in 1978 in Huntington Beach, California. Although most commonly associated with hardcore punk, T.S.O.L.'s music has varied on each release, including such styles as deathrock, art punk, horror punk, other varieties of punk music, and hard rock.

== History ==
=== 1978–1983: Original lineup ===
While in high school, Jack Grisham and Todd Barnes were introduced through Barnes' girlfriend. Grisham and Barnes became friends, and took off with the girlfriend's guitar and amplifier and began playing around with sounds. In the beginning, Grisham claims, "All we did was make a bunch of noise and yell, ‘Fuck the neighbors’ all day." In 1978, Grisham and Barnes began rehearsing with Joneses guitarist Steve Houston (a.k.a. Steve Dead) and bassist Laddy Tirrell, forming the band Vicious Circle. They quickly gained a following within the beach cities and Los Angeles punk rock scene. Vicious Circle was notorious for Ultra-violence at shows in the early days of punk rock. Grisham is later quoted as saying "Whatever the logic, the Vicious Circle was a maniac attractor."

After the demise of Vicious Circle, T.SO.L. was formed in 1978 in Huntington Beach, CA. The original lineup consisted of vocalist Jack Grisham (who has been credited as Jack Greggors, Fatty G, Alex Morgon, Jack Ladoga, Jack Delauge and Jack Loyd, among pseudonyms), guitarist Ron Emory, bassist Mike Roche and drummer Todd Barnes. According to legend, the band acquired their instruments by casing a local music shop, waiting until closing, and then performing a smash-and-grab robbery.

T.S.O.L.'s debut five-song EP, T.S.O.L., was released in spring 1981 by Posh Boy Records, featuring the original lineup. This first release was harshly political, featuring tracks such as "Superficial Love", "World War III" and "Abolish Government".

Grisham brought a darker fashion and sound to the highly political punk rock scene in Southern California, painting his face white, dressing in all-black goth clothes and doing darker photo-shoots in cemetery locations in the dead of night. Their first full-length album, Dance with Me, was released later in 1981 on Frontier Records, and showcased a more gothic sound. Author Steven Blush attributed the shift from punk to goth as being influenced by The Damned, who had released The Black Album the previous year. For the album tour, the band added Frank Agnew of the Adolescentsas a second guitarist.

T.S.O.L continued in a gothic direction after signing to Alternative Tentacles, releasing the melodic Weathered Statues EP early in 1982, and the album Beneath the Shadows later that year; the latter featuring a new member, keyboardist Greg Kuehn.

The original T.S.O.L. broke up on January 9, 1983, following the infamous S.I.R. Studios "Sunset Strip Riot" at a headlining show featuring Redd Kross, Social Distortion, Los Olvidados. Approximately 2,500 people were in the audience for T.S.O.L.'s set, when a police riot squad arrived, ordering the music to stop. Grisham commanded the crowd to sit down in order to force the police to drag them out one by one, while the band played John Lennon’s “Give Peace a Chance”. He then ordered the audience to attack the police, and a riot ensued.

Seeing thousands of people follow his command, Grisham later said he did not like having the power to be “a punk rock Jim Jones”. He further articulated about this, "After that, people kept screaming, 'Jack, tell us what to do!' There was a backlash. 'Jack was God.' And 'Jack was my hero.' And I didn't want anything to do with it.” In the aftermath of this show, Grisham, Barnes, and Kuehn walked away from the band due to interpersonal turmoil.

=== 1984–1998: Joe Wood era ===
After his exit, Grisham formed Cathedral of Tears, who released a 1984 EP on Enigma Records. Following the release of the Cathedral of Tears EP, T.S.O.L.'s replacement drummer, Mitch Dean, referred to Cathedral of Tears as a "synthesizer band" whose music he did not particularly like, adding, "not to make fun of it or anything," but that "[Grisham's] doing what he wants."

T.S.O.L. chose to reconfigure with vocalist Joe Wood (Grisham's brother-in-law) and drummer Mitch Dean. after Emory and Wood, who were playing together in a blues band called The Loners, decided to start a new group. Originally they had not planned on being called T.S.O.L., but their manager said using the name could get a tour booked and a record deal.

This new lineup released four albums on Enigma, featuring a more polished production style,, starting with 1984's Change Today?. While this album continued to take the band in a goth rock direction, by 1986's Revenge, they had embraced a poppier hard rock sound, and their next album Hit and Run (1987), marked another sharp departure of both sound and image, drawing comparisons to Glam metal bands like Poison and Faster Pussycat. Hit and Run reached No. 184 on the Billboard 200 charts, and the band's followed it up with their first live album, Live, released in 1988. During this period, the band became friendly with Guns N' Roses, and Steven Adler wore a T.S.O.L. t-shirt in the video for their hit song "Sweet Child o' Mine". They were chosen as the opening act for tours with Guns N' Roses and the Red Hot Chili Peppers.

Emory left the band in 1988, during the recording of demos for a new album, leaving Roche as the sole remaining original member—though Emory was given a writing credit on the track "Blow by Blow". T.S.O.L. were joined briefly by guitarist Scotty Phillips, who quit before the band started recording the follow-up to Hit and Run. They eventually hired former Dino's Revenge guitarist and actor Marshall Rohner.

In 1989, T.S.O.L. recorded a new album titled, Strange Love, which would be released 1990. Roche left the band in October 1989, after internal problems caused their tour to be canceled after only a few dates, leaving the band with no original members. Meanwhile, Wood had allowed the original members of T.S.O.L. to reunite for what was planned to be a one off show at the Celebrity Theatre in Anaheim.

Because Wood and Dean were the legal owners of the name T.S.O.L., the original members were forced to use the name L.O.S.T. when they decided to do additional shows after their reunion, despite the fact that the Wood and Dean lineup broke up in 1992. The two reformed T.S.O.L. for shows in 1997 and 1998, with bassist Dave Mello, and guitarists Mike Martt and Drac Conley. Dean was subsequently replaced by Steve "Sully" O'Sullivan.

=== 1999–present: Second Grisham era ===
In 1999, Wood gave the rights to the band name back to the original members, in exchange for a cut of the next T.S.O.L. album's sales. However, Barnes died of a brain aneurysm on December 6, 1999, at the age of 34. After Barnes, death the remaining members recruited drummer Danny Westerman from Down By Law, but replaced him with Jay O'Brien shortly afterwards. This lineup played the 2000 Vans Warped Tour, and released the "Anticop" single (2001) and the albums Disappear (2001) and Divided We Stand (2003), all on Nitro Records, the latter of which featured Kuehn back on keyboards as well as Billy Blaze replacing O'Brien.

In 2005, with new drummer Anthony "Tiny" Buisu, the band released the video album Live in Hawaii and the retrospective album Who's Screwin' Who?, the latter consisting of songs from T.S.O.L., Dance with Me, Weathered Statues, Beneath the Shadows, Disappear, and Divided We Stand re-recorded by the 2005 lineup (originally released through Anarchy Music, it was later re-released by Cleopatra Records under the titles F#*k You Tough Guy: The Collection and Code Blue).

In November 2006, the band announced they were breaking up, with final performances having taken place earlier in the month. In September 2007, Cider City Records released the seemingly posthumous live album Live from Long Beach, recorded in November 2006 on the weekend of the band's two announced "farewell" performances.

The hiatus was short-lived, as they returned to perform local shows in late 2007, the same year Nitro reissued Dance with Me. In 2008, The Early Years Live, a video release, and the live album Live from Long Beach, recorded at their next to last show before the hiatus, were released.

In February 2008, T.S.O.L headlined the "Fuck the Whales, Save a Chckn" benefit, held to help with cancer treatment bills for guitarist Craig "Chckn" Jewett of D.I. In December 2008, the band entered the studio to record Life, Liberty & the Pursuit of Free Downloads, which was made available as a free download through sponsor Hurley International's website on January 8, 2009. It was also released on vinyl by DC-Jam Records in November 2009.

Grisham formed Jack Grisham's LOST Soul in 2012, a gigging ensemble featuring Kuehn and Biuso, with the intent of performing T.S.O.L. and The Joykiller material.

On April 20, 2013, T.S.O.L. released a 7-inch EP, You Don't Have to Die (TKO Records), for Record Store Day, composed of the title track (an unreleased 1980 demo) and two 1981 live tracks. That same year, the band toured Europe and South America; they also completed a US tour with Flag.

On January 27, 2017, the band released The Trigger Complex album on Rise Records. The album was co-written with and featured rhythm guitar by Frank Agnew. In August 2017, Antonio Val Hernandez joined the band as drummer, replacing Hanna.

In 2024, a new studio album, A-Side Graffiti was released on February 27.

In December 2025, Grisham issued a statement indicating their upcoming shows in January could be their last. By November of that next year, he confirmed that T.S.O.L. had ended, with him forming a new project called Jack Grisham and The Life Undone, Roche being unable to play due to Parkinson’s Disease, and Emory playing again in a group with Joe Wood. Wood and Emory perform together as Change Today, playing songs from Wood's era of T.S.O.L.

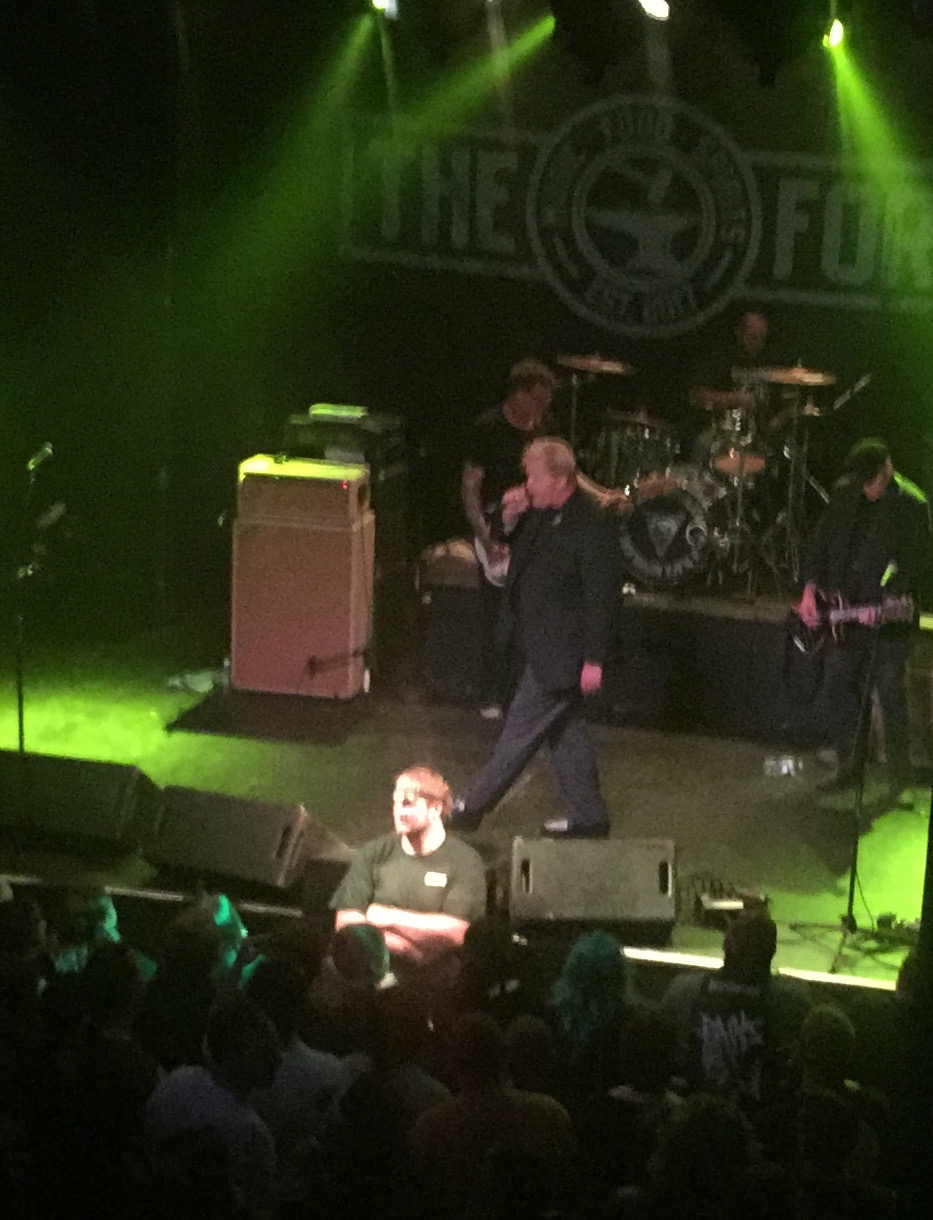
T.S.O.L. performing in 2018 at the Forge in Joliet, Illinois in support of Dead Kennedys

== Film and television appearances ==
In 1981, director Paul Young made Urban Struggle: The Battle of The Cuckoo's Nest, a film which featured live performances by T.S.O.L. as well as several Orange County punk and hardcore bands. Dave Markey's 1982 film The Slog Movie also featured live T.S.O.L. performances, as did Penelope Spheeris' 1984 Suburbia with their performances of "Wash Away" & "Darker My Love". Their music was featured as the soundtrack to the classic 1985 skateboarding/skaterock VHS video, Summer Sessions. They also appeared in the 1989 movie The Runnin' Kind. Their music was also featured in the popular 1985 horror movie The Return of the Living Dead and 1986 film Dangerously Close. They were also mentioned in the 2007 documentary Punk's Not Dead.

In 2003, the band made their debut in Hawaii and it was filmed for a DVD that was released by Hawaiian Express Records when they returned a year later. It includes footage of them playing in a club with no stage, plus at the Volcom House on the world-famous North Shore, and interviews by legendary skateboarder Jay Adams.

== Legacy and influence ==
The Offspring’s guitarist, Noodles, has stated, “Without T.S.O.L. there would be no Offspring.” They have covered "Superficial Love" and "Abolish Government/Silent Majority" live with Ron Emory, A studio cover of "80 Times" appeared on their Happy Hour! compilation, Other prominent groups have covered T.S.O.L. songs: Slayer recorded a medley of "Abolish Government" and "Superficial Love" for their 1996 album Undisputed Attitude, while "Code Blue" has been covered by the The Bouncing Souls in 1995 on Punk Rock Jukebox and again that year by Black Velvet Flag on Come Recline., and parodied by Manic Hispanic on 2003's Mijo Goes to Jr. College under the title "Code Brown". Alkaline Trio covered "Wash Away" in 2004 on the soundtrack for the video game Tony Hawk’s American Wasteland, and most recently Neil Hamburger recorded a version of "Sounds" of Laughter" on his 2018 album Still Dwelling.

Pennywise included the song "Property is Theft" on an Apple Music playlist titled "Songs that Influenced Us", and Green Day's Billie Joe Armstrong credits T.S.O.L. as one of the first bands that exposed him to punk rock. Brett Guerwitz credits T.S.O.L.’s use of keyboards in influencing Bad Religion to use them on the album Into the Unknown.

== Band members ==
- Mike Roche – bass (1978–1990, 1991, 1999–2026)
- Ron Emory – guitar, vocals (1978–1988, 1991, 1999–2026)
- Jack Grisham – vocals, piano (1978–1983, 1991, 1999–2026)
- Greg Kuehn – piano, synthesizers (1982–1983, 2005–2026)
- Todd Barnes – drums (1978–1983, 1991, 1999; died 1999)
- Joe Wood – vocals, guitar (1983–1999)
- Mitch Dean – drums (1983–1998)
- Marshall Rohner – guitar (1988–1992; died 2005)
- Dave Mello – bass (1990-1992, 1997-1999)
- Mike Martt – guitar (1997–1999; died 2023)
- Drac Conley – guitar (1997–1999)
- Steve "Sully" O'Sullivan – drums (1998–1999)
- Danny Westerman – drums (1999)
- Jay O'Brien – drums (1999–2003)
- Billy Blaze – drums (2003)
- Anthony "Tiny" Biuso – drums (2003–2014)
- Matt Rainwater – drums (2014–2016)
- Chip Hanna – drums (2016–2017)
- Antonio Val Hernandez – drums (2017–2026)

== Discography ==
Studio albums

- Dance with Me (1981)
- Beneath the Shadows (1983)
- Change Today? (1984)
- Revenge (1986)
- Hit and Run (1987)
- Strange Love (1990)
- Disappear (2001)
- Divided We Stand (2003)
- Life, Liberty & the Pursuit of Free Downloads (2009)
- The Trigger Complex (2017)
- A-Side Graffiti (2024)
