= Steven Blush =

American author and journalist

- Citizenship: United States
- Education: George Washington University
- Occupations: Writer, journalist, filmmaker
- Notable work: American Hardcore: A Tribal History

Steven Blush is an American author, journalist and filmmaker known for his book American Hardcore: A Tribal History and its documentary film adaptation. He founded Seconds magazine and has written about music and popular culture for publications including Spin, Kerrang! and The Village Voice. His work focuses primarily on punk and hardcore music.

== Early life and education ==
Blush grew up in suburban New Jersey in a Jewish family. He traveled frequently to New York City with his father, who operated a print shop on Manhattan's Lower East Side, and began spending time around the downtown music and fashion scene. He has described frequenting venues such as CBGB as well as local shops including Trash and Vaudeville.

Blush also spent time in England, where he encountered UK punk acts including the Clash and Sham 69. He later moved to Washington, D.C., to attend George Washington University. While there, he became involved in the local hardcore punk scene after attending a Black Flag concert, and he later worked with bands including Black Flag, Minor Threat, Circle Jerks and Dead Kennedys. He has also been described as briefly managing the band No Trend.

As a student, Blush worked as a DJ at the college radio station and booked concerts, including arranging for Dead Kennedys to play in the university cafeteria. After graduation, he returned to New York City and continued DJing in local clubs.

== Career ==
=== Journalism ===
Blush began writing about music and popular culture for magazines including Spin, Details, and Kerrang!. His first published assignment was an interview with the Cro-Mags. He founded Seconds, an interview-focused magazine, and conducted interviews with musicians including Glenn Danzig. It ran from 1987 to 2000.

A selection of interviews from Seconds was collected in 0.45 Dangerous Minds: The Most Intense Interviews From Seconds Magazine. Blush has also been profiled by Paper magazine.

=== Books ===
In the mid-1990s, Blush began researching and writing American Hardcore: A Tribal History, a history of the U.S. hardcore punk scene from 1980 to 1986. In interviews, he described the project as an attempt to document a period he felt was overlooked in mainstream rock histories. A documentary film adaptation, also titled American Hardcore, was released in 2006. The film premiered at the 2006 Sundance Film Festival and later screened at the Toronto International Film Festival.

Blush's book American Hair Metal examines the U.S. glam metal scene of the 1980s. Spin described the book as a retrospective of the era featuring commentary from musicians including members of Poison and Mötley Crüe. His book Lost Rockers profiles musicians whose careers did not achieve mainstream success.

New York Rock surveys the city's rock music history from the mid-1960s to the closing of CBGB in 2006. In interviews, Blush said he chose the period to reflect shifts in both the city's music scene and cultural life. Kirkus Reviews described the book as a "brisk overview of New York City's rock 'n' roll tradition, from doo-wop to hard core, mirroring the city's transformations". AM New York described it as a wide-ranging overview of well-known and lesser-known acts associated with the city's rock scene.

== Works ==
=== Books ===
- —— (2001). Petros, George (ed.). American Hardcore: A Tribal History. Los Angeles: Feral House. ISBN 0-922915-71-7.
  - —— (2010). Petros, George (ed.). American Hardcore: A Tribal History (2nd ed.). Port Townsend: Feral House. ISBN 978-1-932595-89-5.
- ——; Petros, George, eds. (2005). .45 Dangerous Minds: The Most Intense Interviews From Seconds Magazine. London: Creation Books. ISBN 1-84068-124-1.
- American Hair Metal (2006).
- Lost Rockers: Broken Dreams and Crashed Careers (2016).
- New York Rock: From the Rise of the Velvet Underground to the Fall of CBGB (2016).

=== Film ===
- American Hardcore (2006) – documentary film (based on the book).
