= Jack Grisham =

American singer

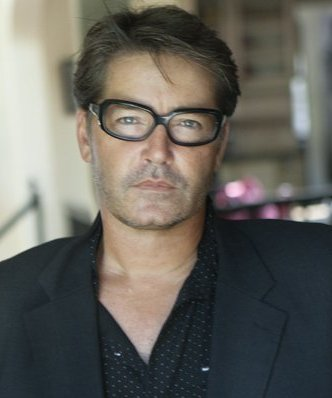
- Grisham in 2011

Background information
- Also known as: Jack Loyd Grisham, Jack Loyd Jones, Jack Greggors, Alex Morgan, Jack Ladoga, James DeLauge, Jim Woo, Arthur Chance
- Born: July 22, 1961 (age 65); Long Beach, California, U.S.
- Genres: Punk rock; hardcore punk; anarcho-punk; deathrock; horror punk
- Occupations: Singer, author
- Years active: 1978–present
- Website: jackgrisham.com

Jack Grisham (born July 22, 1961) is an American rock singer from Southern California. He is the vocalist for the punk rock band T.S.O.L. (True Sounds of Liberty), which emerged from the late 1970s Los Angeles hardcore punk rock scene, along with Black Flag, Circle Jerks and Bad Religion. Grisham has also fronted the bands Vicious Circle, the Joykiller, Tender Fury and Cathedral of Tears. He records with T.S.O.L., the Joykiller and the Manic Low.

== Biography ==
=== Early life ===
Jack Grisham was born in Long Beach, California. Grisham's father, a career military man who served thirty years in the Navy and Coast Guard, died in 1984. Grisham's mother was a military housewife. Grisham was one of five children and has an older sister, two older brothers, and a younger sister.

Grisham's older sister was part of the hippie subculture. Grisham was exposed to publications like Fritz the Cat and Zap Comix and albums by Frank Zappa and the Mothers of Invention, the Beach Boys, and the Ventures from a young age. Grisham cites the albums We're Only in it for the Money and Let it Bleed as two of his musical influences.

Growing up, Grisham was interested in surfing, skateboarding, and "causing trouble."

While in high school, he met future T.S.O.L. drummer Todd Barnes. Grisham and Barnes became friends, and soon began making music together. In the beginning, Grisham claims, "All we did was make a bunch of noise and yell, ‘Fuck the neighbors’ all day."

=== Adult life ===
As a teenager, Grisham began experimenting with mood altering substances, and soon became addicted to drugs and alcohol. He recalled, "I was a nut. I used to think I didn't have a problem because I didn't shoot up and I didn't take acid."

After several minor tangles with the law stemming from his drug and alcohol abuse, Grisham attained sobriety in 1989. He has two daughters, Anastasia and Georgia, and resides in Huntington Beach, California.

=== Vicious Circle ===
In 1978, Grisham began rehearsing as lead vocalist with future Joneses/The Klan/A.K.A. guitarist Steve Houston (a.k.a. Steve Dead) to form Vicious Circle with bassist Laddy Tirrell and future T.S.O.L. drummer Todd Barnes. Vicious Circle quickly got a following within the beach cities and Los Angeles punk rock scene. Vicious Circle was notorious for violence at shows in the early days of punk rock. Grisham is later quoted as saying "Whatever the logic, the Vicious Circle was a maniac attractor."

- A recording of Vicious Circle was made in 1978 consisting of 2 separate practice tapes and ultimately released in 2013 by TKO Records as an E.P. record of (200) copies on white vinyl with blue spatter.

=== True Sounds of Liberty (T.S.O.L.) ===
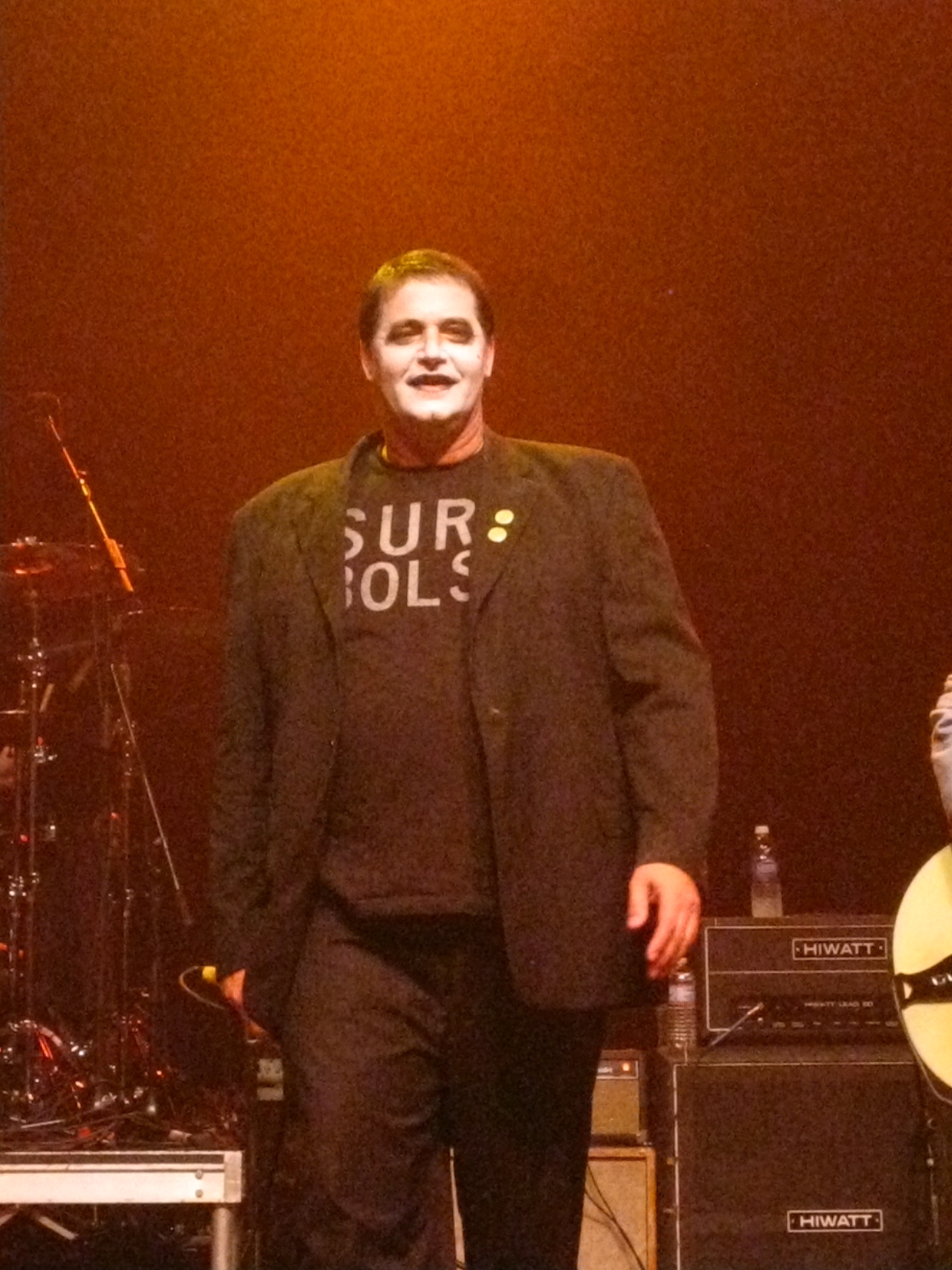
Grisham performing with T.S.O.L. in 2011

Childhood friends Grisham and Barnes were joined by Ron Emory and Mike Roche to form a band called T.S.O.L. The original line-up of the band included Grisham on vocals, Ron Emory on guitars, Mike Roche on bass, and Todd Barnes on drums.

T.S.O.L.'s initial line-up gained fans from the hardcore punk, art punk, death punk, deathrock, horror punk, and goth genres. During his time with T.S.O.L., Grisham brought a darker fashion and deathrock sound to the punk rock scene in Long Beach, California by painting his face white, dressing in goth clothes, and using cemeteries as photo shoots locations. The band were among the first wave of Southern California bands embarking on nationwide tours performing punk rock and death rock music in 1982 and also 1983. The band embraced the D.I.Y. ethos of the early punk rock scene, self-financing their concert tours with little to no outside assistance from the record industry.

The original T.S.O.L. disbanded in 1983 following a riot at S.I.R. Studios during a show also featuring Redd Kross, Social Distortion, and Los Olvidados. Grisham quit the band following this incident. Ron Emory and Mike Roche enlisted vocalist Joe Wood to replace Grisham.

The original T.S.O.L. reformed in 1989.

=== The Joykiller ===
Grisham and Ron Emory formed The Joykiller in 1995 along with Billy Persons (The Weirdos/Gun Club) on bass, Ronnie King on keyboards, and Chris Lagerborg on drums. The Joykiller released three albums on Epitaph records prior to disbanding in 1998. The band had a minor radio hit in the Netherlands with the song "Go-Bang." They later released their Greatest Non-Hits in 2003.

=== The Manic Low ===
In the fall of 2011, Grisham started a new musical project called The Manic Low. Their debut album, Songs For An Up Day, was released on Moonlight Graham Records in June 2012.

=== Film ===
Grisham appears as himself in the movies American Hardcore and the Geza X film Rage: 20 Years of Punk Rock West Coast Style (2001), having additionally written the track "Spit Up the Rage" from the latter film. In the 1984 Penelope Spheeris film Suburbia, he appears with T.S.O.L. performing "Wash Away" and "Darker My Love." In (2020) Grisham wrote and directed the short film "288," and in (2021) directed the feature-length documentary "Ignore Heroes."

=== Politics ===
In the early years of T.S.O.L., Grisham was an outspoken anarchist, with his lyrics often critical of the government, as exemplified in songs such as "Abolish Government/Silent Majority," "Peace Thru Power," and "Property Is Theft." Grisham later changed his anti-government stance, stating, "What I realized about anarchy is that we are not responsible enough to be anarchist. There's no way possible. We're not responsible enough to be that. That's a heavy concept."

Grisham was one of 135 candidates who ran for governor in the 2003 California gubernatorial recall election, receiving 2,200 votes. He ran on a social democratic platform as incumbent Democratic governor Gray Davis was recalled. During his campaign, he stressed the importance of healthcare and education, and supported the teaching of religious tolerance in schools. A concert event featuring The Adolescents, T.S.O.L., and Youth Brigade was held in October 2003 at the Henry Fonda theater in Los Angeles, California in support of the campaign.

=== Writing ===
In 2011, Grisham released his first novel An American Demon: A Memoir. In 2015, he released A Principle of Recovery: An Unconventional Journey Through the Twelve Steps.

In late 2021, Grisham released a noir novel. It is about a character named Arthur which is based on Jack himself, including many characteristics of Jack when he was on his road to sobriety. The back cover blurb of the book states: “When the ghosts of dreams bleed into real life, hard charging Arthur Chance must leave behind his isolation and step into the world of murder, extortion, and double-crossing lovers. Violence and retribution stand heavy in the wings, but will Arthur become lion or lamb?”

== Bibliography ==
Novels

- An American Demon: A Memoir (2011)
- Code Blue: A Love Story (2014)
- A Principle of Recovery: An Unconventional Journey Through the Twelve Steps (2015)
- I Wish There Were Monsters (2015)
- The Pulse Of The World (2022)
- True Stories (2023)
- The Coffee Maker (2024)
- Transmission (2025)

== Discography ==
=== Vicious Circle ===
- Vicious Circle EP (TKO) #192. RELEASE: 2013, Originally recorded in 1978.

Vinyl, 12", EP, White Vinyl With Blue Splatter

=== T.S.O.L. ===
==== LPs ====
- Dance with Me – (1981)
- Beneath the Shadows – (1983)
- Disappear – (2001)
- Divided We Stand – (2003)
- Who's Screwin' Who? – (2005)
- Live from Long Beach – (2007)
- Life, Liberty & the Pursuit of Free Downloads – (2009)
- The Trigger Complex – (2017)

==== EPs ====
- T.S.O.L. EP – (1981)
- Weathered Statues – (1982)

==== Singles ====
- "Anticop" – (2001)

==== Compilations ====
- Thoughts of Yesterday: 1981–1982 – (1988)
- Weathered Statues – (1997)

==== Bootlegs ====
- 1980 Demo – (1980)

==== Movie soundtracks ====
- Suburbia (1984) Soundtrack
- American Hardcore: The History Of American Punk Rock 1980–1986
- Rage: 20 Years of Punk Rock West Coast Style (2001)

==== Filmography ====
- Suburbia (1984) / a Penelope Spheeris film
- American Hardcore: The History Of American Punk Rock 1980–1986
- Rage: 20 Years of Punk Rock West Coast Style (2001)
- Punks not Dead
- Let it Rock
- Live In Hawaii (DVD) – (2004)
- Live In OC (DVD) – (2001)
- The Early Years / T.S.O.L. Live MVD release

=== The Joykiller ===
- The Joykiller (1995) on Epitaph Records
- Static (1996) on Epitaph Records
- Three (1997) on Epitaph Records
- Ready Sexed Go! (2003) on Epitaph Records
- Music for Break-Ups (2015)

Rob Dukes, lead singer for the metal band Exodus, performed background vocals on the Joykiller albums Static and Three.

=== Tender Fury ===
- Tender Fury (Posh Boy) 1988
- Garden of Evil (Triple X) 1990
- If Anger Were Soul, I'd Be James Brown (Triple X) 1991

=== Cathedral of Tears ===
- Cathedral of Tears (Enigma) 1984

=== Jack Grisham/Mike Roche/Ron Emory/Todd Barnes ===
- Live 1991 (Triple X) 1991

=== T.S.O.L./Slayer ===
- Abolish Government EP7 (Sub Pop) 1996

=== The Manic Low ===
- Songs For An Up Day (Moonlight Graham Records), 2012.

"Songs For An Up Day" features Sean Greaves on guitar and bass, Rob MiLucky on guitar, and Paul Roessler on keyboards.
