= Ron Emory =

- Born: Ronald Emory; May 20, 1962 (age 64); Lynwood, California, United States
- Origin: Huntington Beach, California
- Genres: Hardcore punk punk rock horror punk
- Occupations: Musician, Producer, Vocals, Guitarist
- Instruments: Guitar, Vocals
- Years active: 1979–present
- Website: www.ronemory.com

Ronald Emory (born May 20, 1962, Lynwood, California, United States) is an American rock musician and guitarist for the punk rock band T.S.O.L. (True Sounds of Liberty). An original member of the band, founded in Southern California in 1979, Emory left in 1987 prior to the release of the album Hit and Run. In 1996, he joined the other original members of T.S.O.L. to reform the band, which remains active. Emory worked on a solo project titled Walk That Walk, which was released on April 15, 2010.

Emory played with Social Distortion during their 2006 tour to fill in for his friend Mike Ness, who had broken his wrist in a skateboarding accident.

== Biography ==
=== Early life ===
He grew up in Southern California where he met Jack Grisham, Todd Barnes and Mike Roche to form the Punk Band, T.S.O.L. in 1979. T.S.O.L was the first SoCal punk group to draw widespread fame.

=== Adult life ===
Emory says he has been clean and been sober since February 10, 1999, and has amends and tried to make good decisions and, "...seek a healthy relationship with God." He owns and produces music from his own production studio, Prairie Productions Studio. He currently lives in Sioux City, Iowa, with his wife and children.

=== True Sounds of Liberty (T.S.O.L.) ===
Emory joined friends Jack Grisham, Todd Barnes and Mike Roche to form the Punk Band, T.S.O.L. The original line-up of the band was vocalist Jack Grisham, guitarist Ron Emory, bassist Mike Roche, and drummer Todd Barnes.

T.S.O.L.'s initial line-up gained a fans from the hardcore punk, art punk, death punk, horror punk, and goth genres. During his time with T.S.O.L., the band was notorious for their controversial, transgressive, and political lyrics.

The original T.S.O.L. broke up in 1983, and Emory and Mike Roche enlisted vocalist Joe Wood (Grisham's brother-in-law at the time) and drummer Mitch Dean into the band, playing hair metal, touring and recording under the name T.S.O.L.

The original T.S.O.L. reformed in 1989, but lost Todd Barnes who died of a brain aneurysm in 1999. T.S.O.L. has been touring and recording steadily since 1999.

=== Lunch Box ===
Emory teamed up with singer/song writer Tim Swenson, bassist Tracy Stevens, and drummer London May in 1987 to form the band Lunch Box. They played the Long Beach, CA rock/punk scene during their short reign from 1987-1990. There have been no official release of any of the groups vast archive of heralded material."

=== The Joykiller ===
Emory and Jack Grisham formed The Joykiller in 1995 along with Billy Persons (The Weirdos/Gun Club) on bass, Ronnie King on keyboards, and Chris Lagerborg on drums. The Joykiller released three albums on Epitaph records prior to disbanding in 1998 and had a minor radio hit in the Netherlands with the song "Go-Bang." They later released their Greatest Non-Hits in 2005.

=== Solo career ===
Emory recorded Walk That Walk at Hurley Studios in Costa Mesa, California. His inspiration for this album came from his family and close friends, Davey Warsop from the Beat Union, Dexter Holland from The Offspring, Mike Ness from Social Distortion, JonnyRay Bartel from the Knitters and Jack Grisham, Mike Roche and Tiny from T.S.O.L. Walk That Walk was released on April 15, 2010."
