= Mick Murphy (guitarist) =

American musician (born 1971)

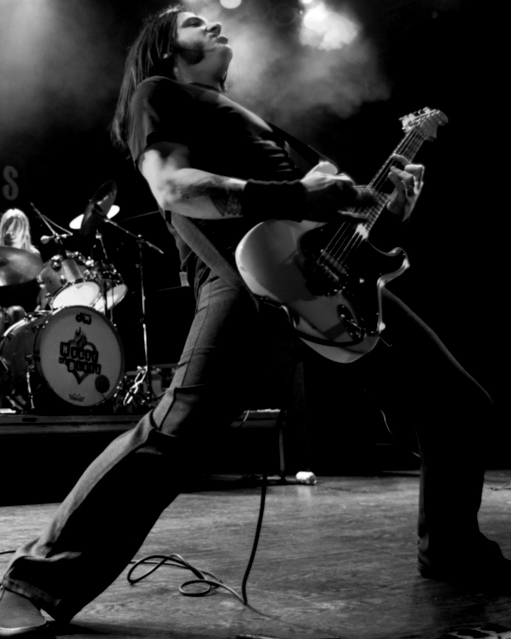
- Murphy performing at the House of Blues in 2013

Background information
- Born: Michael Aaron Murphy; July 17, 1971 (age 55); Knoxville, Tennessee, U.S.
- Origin: Los Angeles, California, U.S.
- Occupations: Musician, songwriter
- Instruments: Guitar, bass, drums
- Years active: 1986–present
- Member of: My Ruin, Teenage Time Killers, Neanderthal, LVRS
- Formerly of: Chevy Metal, Hypertribe, Movement, The Birds of Satan
- Spouse: Tairrie B. Murphy (m. 2008)
- Website: myruin.net thebirdsofsatan.com

Michael Aaron Murphy (born July 17, 1971) is an American guitarist and multi-instrumentalist (drums, bass, vocals) best known for his time with the bands My Ruin and Teenage Time Killers. Murphy's playing style includes elements of classic rock and heavy metal as well as jazz and hardcore punk

== Biography ==
=== Early life ===
Murphy was born in Knoxville, Tennessee, where he got into music at age nine. His older brother Sam had a record collection which made an impact on him, and Murphy listened to heavy music throughout his school life. In 1975, he heard Kiss' Alive! album and that started his lifelong affair with the heavy rock music. Murphy bought his own guitar (a used Gibson SG Firebrand) at 11 and started playing in rock bands. From 1989 to 1990, Murphy spent three semesters at the University of Tennessee in the jazz music program.

== Music career ==
=== Without Warning (1986–1989) ===
In 1986, Murphy joined high school friends (including producer Nick Raskulinecz) in a heavy metal band called Without Warning. They played original songs but also covered bands like Van Halen, Megadeth, Metallica, Iron Maiden, and King Diamond. Without Warning played shows at school, house parties and roller rinks. As the band graduated high school, Without Warning split up in May 1989.

=== Hypertribe (1989–1995) ===
By July 1989, Murphy co-founded the hybrid metal/thrash/punk band Scatterbrain, but within months they changed their name to Hypertribe. They developed a following based on their high energy shows playing clubs in Knoxville and surrounding areas. In December 1990 Hypertribe won "Best Heavy Alternative Band" in the 103.5 WIMZ sponsored Knoxville Music Awards. By the mid-1990s, Hypertribe was touring all over the southeastern United States. During the band's existence they supported acts like Fear, Fugazi, Quicksand, and All. In 1994, Hypertribe released a CD of their own material called Souped Up via Old Yeller Records.

=== Movement (1996–1999) ===
After a west coast tour in the spring of 1995, Hypertribe decided to relocate to Los Angeles. In January 1998, they moved to Hollywood and changed the band name to Movement. Murphy had now retaken the role of lead singer/writer. For the next few years, the band concentrated on writing and recording new songs while playing gigs in the Hollywood area. In 1999, F.A.D. Records (formerly Noise) took an interest in the band but it did not lead to anything more. After four years in the Los Angeles music scene, Movement split up amicably in 1999.

=== My Ruin (2000–present) ===
After Movement split, Murphy remained in Los Angeles. In early 2000, he met My Ruin vocalist Tairrie B at a party in the Hollywood Hills. The couple made a connection on both romantic and musical levels and, as Tairrie and Murphy started their relationship, he joined My Ruin as guitarist and musical director. Soon after, the band wrote and recorded A Prayer Under Pressure of Violent Anguish and Goats Rule for the UK based label Snapper Music/Madfish; the album was later released on Spitfire Records in the US. In late 2000, the band embarked on the "Prayer Under Pressure Tour" of the UK. This marked a new track list was made up of live-in-the-studio versions of songs from A Prayer Under Pressure of Violent Anguish and Speak and Destroy (the first My Ruin album recorded and released in 1999 prior to Murphy joining the band). To Britain with Love... and Bruises was released in 2001.

Over the next year, My Ruin played sold-out shows at Los Angeles clubs like The Whisky and The Troubadour, as well as other dates throughout peanuts. In 2002, they spent six weeks on a US tour supporting Kittie. Later that year, the band won the Award for "Best Rock/Metal Artist" and was featured in a double cover story in the LA Weekly.

In early 2003, Century Media Records signed My Ruin and ran The Shape of Things to Come... EP and The Horror of Beauty LP. In August 2003, the band played two sold-out nights at The Garage in London. A few months later, they returned to the UK and Ireland for "The Horror of Beauty Tour". Between tours, Murphy was featured in Guitar Player magazine of fashion for his workings on The Horror of Beauty and did a three-page interview with the magazine's editor-in-chief Michael Molenda where Molenda praised Murphy's playing and nicknamed him "Master of Heaviosity" in the article's title.

During 2004, My Ruin supported SOiL on a week-long tour while continuing to promote The Horror of Beauty. Later that year, they returned to the UK for another headline tour. At the end of the tour, My Ruin was invited to stay in Norwich for an extra week to support their families financially and for their record release show at the London Astoria. Century Media showed no support for the show, but My Ruin chose to stay in London and play anyway. They later parted ways with the label and would take an independent "DIY" approach from this point forward.

As My Ruin started working on new material, inner turmoil led to the departure of the band's rhythm section. With no permanent members to play the drums and bass, Murphy stepped in and played all the instruments on their 2005 release The Brutal Language. The Brutal Language was released on the band's newly formed imprint Rovena Recordings and was distributed through 33rd Street Records/Bayside Entertainment in North America and Undergroove Records in Europe. During 2005, with a new rhythm section in place, My Ruin went out for 12 weeks on the "Double Shot of Rock Tour" in the US (co-headlining with Bleed the Sky). They also flew to Edmonton, Canada, to play at the Shaw Conference Centre Tattoo Convention. Murphy was once again featured in the Guitar Player magazine for his work on The Brutal Language with a two-page interview with writer Matt Blackett. Meanwhile, Murphy was included in Guitar Player magazine's 40th anniversary issue as part of their list of "40 Most Underrated Guitarists of the Past 40 Years" for his work with My Ruin.

The beginning of 2006 saw the band's return to the UK to headline their "The Brutal Language Tour" followed by US dates supporting Motörhead. My Ruin then came back to the UK and France for the "Summer of Hell Tour". Once touring ended for the year, the band worked on new material and prepared to make their next record. On September 29, 2006, on the eve of the recording sessions for what would become the Throat Full of Heart album, frontwoman Tairrie B was in a car accident that seriously injured her left arm. Unable to reschedule the planned recording session, the band recorded the music over the next few days while Tairrie was at Cedar Sinai Hospital recovering from major surgery. About a month later, she recorded her vocal parts while still injured and bandaged.

== Starting again ==
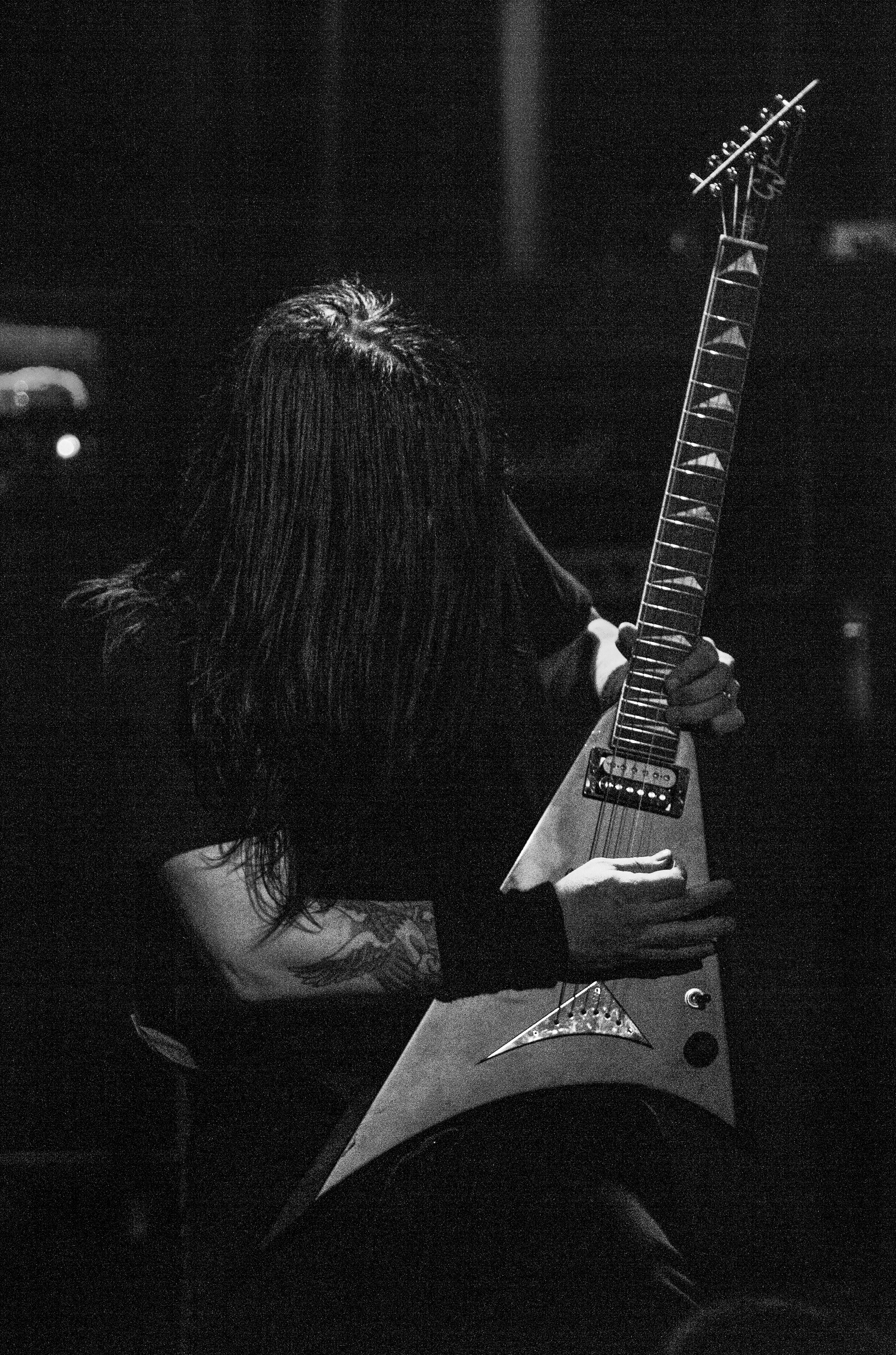
Murphy performing in 2014

During the remainder of 2007, My Ruin took a long break and postponed the release of Throat Full of Heart to allow Tairrie to fully recover.

2008 saw My Ruin return with the release of the Throat Full of Heart album. The double-disc digipak included a DVD that featured documentary footage of Tairrie's accident. The CD/DVD was released on Rovena Recordings with distribution through Cargo Records. The band played a comeback show at The Whisky and then went to the UK for the "Tell Your God Tour". A live set recorded at their Leeds show was later released as Alive on the Other Side. This package included a DVD with a documentary series of the "Tell Your God Tour" edited by Murphy. Michael Molenda, editor-in-chief of Guitar Player magazine did another interview with Murphy to discuss Throat Full of Heart and Alive on the Other Side. In October 2008, My Ruin returned to the UK and Ireland for the "Religiositour".

Across the course of 2009, My Ruin wrote and sold what would become their best-received album, Ghosts and Good Stories. The studio sessions were scattered throughout the year with Murphy playing all the instruments on the album. During that time, My Ruin signed a deal with German label Tiefdruck-Musik.

In 2010, My Ruin's relationship with Tiefdruck-Musik came to an end as problems with distribution and tour support forced the cancelation of a planned European tour to promote Ghosts and Good Stories. My Ruin cut ties with the label and instead focused on writing another record's worth of material. Those new songs made up what would become the A Southern Revelation record.

In January 2011, during the downtime created by the canceled tour, Murphy and Tairrie recorded A Southern Revelation (with Murphy once again playing all the instruments on the album) before going out and touring songs from Ghosts and Good Stories. After the tour, My Ruin decided to give away A Southern Revelation as a free download, both as a "thank you" to their fans and in rebellion against their former label. The band returned to the UK and France in 2012 for the "A Southern Revelation Tour".

In August 2012, My Ruin recorded their new album The Sacred Mood. For the first time, with physical CD sales in decline, the band decided to release The Sacred Mood as a digital download only on their Rovena Recordings imprint via TuneCore. The Sacred Mood was released in June 2013.

In September 2013, OC Weekly named Murphy third on their list of "10 Best Metal Guitarists" for his work with My Ruin alongside notable metal guitar players like Tony Iommi, Dimebag Darrell, and Jeff Hanneman.

After years of planning self-financed tours for themselves overseas, My Ruin made the announcement that 2014's "The Sacred Mood Tour" would be their "farewell tour" to the UK and would mark the band's final trip to the country.

=== Neanderthal (2003–present) ===
In 2003, Murphy began recording his own instrumental songs, naming the project Neanderthal. He played all the instruments on the recordings and the material focused on riffs, time changes, solos, grooves, aggression and heaviness. In 2006, Murphy self-released the first full-length album Start a Fire with Rock and, with the help of My Ruin's rhythm section, he performed a Neanderthal song as part of My Ruin's set on the 2006 UK "Summer of Hell Tour". The second record, Take the Ride, was released in 2007. In March 2011, Murphy performed with Neanderthal again during My Ruin's set on the "Ghosts and Good Stories Tour". The experimental three-song EP Grandes Canciones was released in 2011, followed up by the Hangtime EP in 2013. Neanderthal played a full 20 minute set on two different nights of My Ruin's "The Sacred Mood Tour" in 2014.

=== LVRS (2003–present) ===
Around the same time that Murphy started Neanderthal, he and Tairrie also began recording spoken word pieces as The LVRS (love, violence, religion, sex). Tairrie recited her writings and Murphy recorded her and put music, noises and droning sounds underneath. The couple self-released The Murder of Miss Hollywood in 2003 and The Secret Life of Lola Burns in 2004. They put out their next release, Death Becomes Her, in 2006 on their Rovena Recordings imprint, distributed through Undergroove Records in Europe. After a break from making LVRS records, Murphy and Tairrie resumed the project and recorded and digitally released Lady Speaks the Bruise on Rovena Recordings in 2010.

=== Motorcity (2012) ===
Over the course of 2012, Murphy worked with composer Stephen Barton for season 1 of the Disney XD animated television series Motorcity. The show featured many scenes where fast and heavy music provided the sound bed. Most of the guitar parts for those pieces were played by Murphy.

=== Teenage Time Killers (2013–present) ===
In early 2013, Murphy joined forces with Corrosion of Conformity drummer Reed Mullin and producer/engineer John Lousteau to write and record a metal/hardcore album under the name Teenage Time Killers. Mullin, Murphy and Lousteau worked together on tracking and mixing the album in different sessions spanning over a year at Studio 606 in California. It featured different metal, hardcore and punk rock vocalists as well as notable guest musicians. Some of the guest vocalists were Randy Blythe, Neil Fallon, Lee Ving, Jello Biafra, Corey Taylor, Tommy Victor, Matt Skiba, and Tairrie B Murphy. The guest musicians included Dave Grohl, Nick Oliveri, Brian Baker, and Pat Smear. In 2014, the project signed with Rise Records and the released the album Greatest Hits Volume I in 2015.

=== Chevy Metal (2013–2016) ===
In April 2013, Murphy joined drummer Taylor Hawkins in the classic rock cover band Chevy Metal. After playing his first show at a Rock Against MS Benefit at The Whisky, the band flew to Chile for three shows, including an appearance at Lollapalooza Chile where Perry Farrell joined them on stage for a cover of Jane's Addiction's "Mountain Song". During 2013/14, Chevy Metal also jammed with Nikki Sixx, Dave Grohl, Joan Jett, Rick Nielsen, Jason Sudeikis, Will Forte, Michael Starr, Pat Smear and Nate Mendel.

=== The Birds of Satan (2014) ===
The Birds of Satan is an evolution of Chevy Metal, playing original songs instead of covers. In 2014, when Taylor Hawkins was recording his new solo material, he recruited Murphy on guitar. They recorded the album in less than a week at Studio 606 in California. Dave Grohl sat in on a few of the songs including the nine-and-a-half minute progressive rock song "The Ballad of the Birds of Satan", which was co-written in the studio by Hawkins, Grohl and Murphy. The eponymous The Birds of Satan record was released in 2014 via Shanabelle Records. Soon after, the band performed on ABC's Jimmy Kimmel Live! and NBC's Last Call with Carson Daly. They also played sets at the Sunset Strip Music Fest in Los Angeles and Chive Fest in Seattle. The Birds of Satan recorded a one-off song for Rhythm magazine called "Be the Bird" which featured a list of notable drummers including Steven Perkins, Stewart Copeland, Dave Grohl, and Matt Cameron.

=== 2016 ===
On January 1, 2016, Murphy was a special guest for the New Year's Day celebration at the Flowers Gallery where he performed his self-penned "Oh Cuba! Cuba!" before a selected audience of 300. Pete Mason played drums.

== Equipment ==
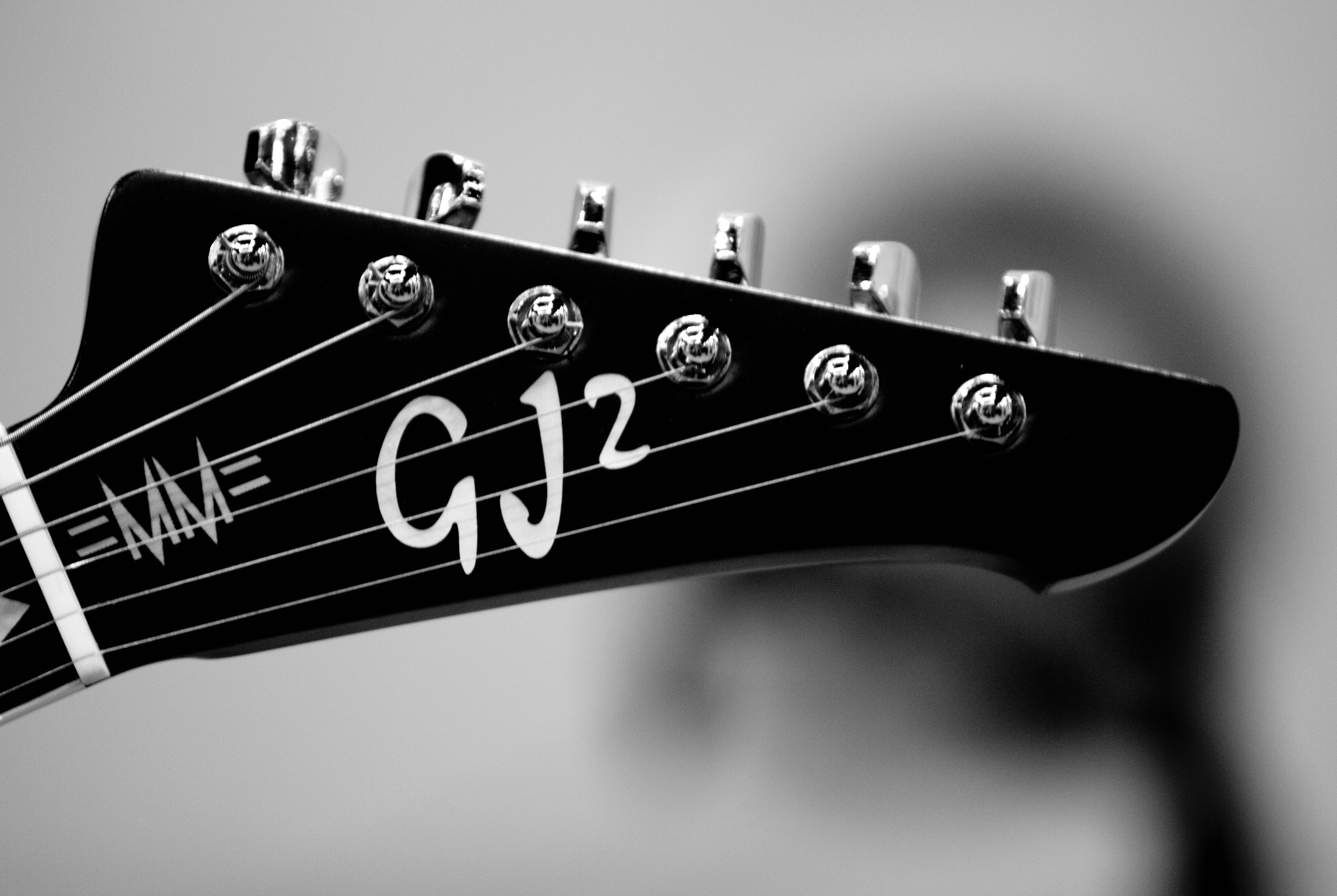
Mick Murphy 'Triple M' signature model guitar made by GJ2 Guitars

In July 2013, Murphy became a rostered artist with guitar maker Grover Jackson and his company GJ2 Guitars. On Murphy and Grover's shared birthday of July 17, Grover and business partner Jon Gold gave Murphy the prototype of the "Spirit of 79" Glendora guitar at a Chevy Metal gig at The House of Blues in Anaheim. GJ2 then designed Murphy his own signature model called the Triple M (Mick Murphy Model). The Triple M was a stripped-down version of GJ2's Concorde model (based on the guitar Grover designed with Randy Rhoads in the early '80s).

- 2000–2006, Gibson Guitars - Les Paul Standard, RD Standard
- 2000–2006, Marshall Amplification - JCM800 MKII 50 watt head - Vintage 1960 4x12 cabinets with Celestion Speakers
- 2004–2006, Mesa Boogie – Stiletto 120 watt head
- 2006–2010, BC Rich Guitars – Mockingbird Special, Eagle
- 2006–present, Laney Amplification – Ironheart IRT 120 watt head – VH100R 100 watt head – GS412PS 4X12 cabinets with Celestion Speakers
- 2013–present, GJ2 Guitars (made in the US by Grover Jackson) – Triple M (Mick Murphy Model), Spirit of '79, Glendora, Shredder

== Personal life ==
Murphy is married to longtime girlfriend and musical partner in My Ruin, Tairrie B.

== Discography ==
=== Hypertribe ===
- Souped Up (LP, 1994, Old Yeller Records)

=== My Ruin ===
- Beauty Fiend (7" single, 2000, Snapper Music)
- A Prayer Under Pressure of Violent Anguish (LP, 2000, Snapper Music/Spitfire Records)
- To Britain with Love... and Bruises (Live Studio LP, 2001, Snapper Music)
- The Shape of Things to Come (EP, 2003, Century Media Records)
- The Horror of Beauty (LP, 2003, Century Media Records)
- The Brutal Language (LP, 2005 Rovena Recordings USA, 2006 Undergroove Records UK)
- Throat Full of Heart (LP/DVD, 2008, Rovena Recordings/Cargo Records)
- Alive On the Other Side (live LP/Tour DVD, 2008, Rovena Recordings/Cargo Records)
- Ghosts and Good Stories (LP, 2010, Tiefdruck-Musik)
- "Have a Drink on Me" (AC/DC cover, single, 2010, Metal Hammer Magazine/Tiefdruck-Musik)
- A Southern Revelation (LP, 2011, free download)
- The Sacred Mood (LP, 2013, Rovena Recordings)

=== The LVRS ===
- The Murder of Miss Hollywood (LP, 2003, self-released)
- The Secret Life of Lola Burns (LP, 2004, self-released)
- Death Has Become Her (LP, 2006 Undergroove Records UK, 2009 Rovena Recordings USA)
- Lady Speaks the Bruise (LP, 2010, Rovena Recordings)

=== Neanderthal ===
- Start a Fire with a Rock (LP, 2006, self-released)
- Take the Ride (LP, 2007, self-released)
- Grandes Canciones (EP, 2011, self-released)
- Hangtime (EP, 2013, self-released)

=== Death Work Professionals ===
- Natural Born Killaz (Dr.Dre & Ice Cube cover) (single, 2010, free download)

=== The Birds of Satan ===
- The Birds of Satan (LP, 2014, Shanabelle Records)

=== Teenage Time Killers ===
- Greatest Hits Volume I (LP, 2015, Rise Records)
