= Greg Kuehn =

American songwriter

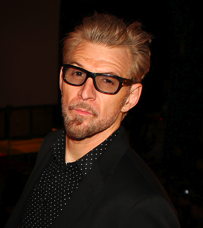
- Kuehn in 2016

Background information
- Born: Gregory Russell Kuehn; Anaheim, California, United States
- Genres: Punk rock, Rock, Film Music
- Occupations: Musician, composer
- Instruments: Keyboards, guitar
- Years active: 1982–present
- Website: www.peligromusic.com

Gregory Russell Kuehn is an American composer, songwriter, musician and producer.

== Career ==
=== As a performing musician ===
Kuehn's career began in Orange County's early punk scene, when he left his classical piano studies at California State University, Long Beach to join horror punk icons T.S.O.L. Together they made the album Beneath the Shadows, still a highly regarded and influential work.

Following his tenure in T.S.O.L., he spent several years as a recording and touring musician working with artists including Bob Dylan, The Church, Duane Peters, Megan Mullally, Berlin and Ian Astbury of The Cult. Most recently, Kuehn has been performing with LA punk legends X, filling in for the late Ray Manzarek of The Doors.

=== Composing film scores ===
Kuehn got his start in film working on the score for cult classic Repo Man, on which he arranged music and played keyboards. Since then, Kuehn has scored numerous films, including Confessions of a Superhero and Meet the Hitlers, both directed by Matt Ogens and produced by film maker Morgan Spurlock, A Small Section of the World, directed by Lesley Chilcott, and The Achievers, The Story of The Lebowski Fans. One of his songs was featured in the documentary The Other F Word, directed by Andrea Nivens. He worked with producer Peter Jackson scoring the trailer for the Amy Berg directed doc, West of Memphis, and has completed the score for Go North a new feature film directed by Matt Ogens, and starring Jacob Lofland, Sophie Kennedy Clark and Patrick Schwarzenegger. Kuehn composed the music for Shooting an Elephant, a narrative short film featured in the 2016 Tribeca Film Festival, directed by Juan Pablo Rothie and written by Alec Sokolow. Code Blue, a short film Kuehn scored based on the T.S.O.L. song and the Jack Grisham short story, was featured in the 2016 Cannes Film Festival Court Metrage (Short Film Corner).

=== Television and commercial work ===
Kuehn has composed the music for CNN Heroes, Stand Up 2 Cancer, Give it up For Greg Giraldo and The Daytime Emmys. Kuehn has scored hundreds of television commercials for clients including Toyota, Ancestry, HP, Subaru, MINI, Hyundai, Honda, Blue Shield, Nike, Adidas, DirecTV, Miller, Gatorade and Petco among many others. His company, Peligro Music and Sound is one of Los Angeles' most sought after boutique music houses.

== Personal life ==
Kuehn's sons Elvis and Max Kuehn are both founding members of LA band FIDLAR, although Elvis left the band in 2022. Greg lives in Los Angeles, CA.

== Discography ==
- T.S.O.L., Beneath the Shadows (1982)
- The Joneses, Criminals (1983)
- Repo Man Soundtrack (1984)
- Suburbia Soundtrack (1984)
- Cruzados, Cruzados (1985)
- Berlin, Count Three & Pray (1986)
- The Joneses, Keeping up with the Joneses (1986)
- Echo Park Soundtrack (1986)
- The Church, Starfish (1988)
- The Joneses, Tits and Champagne (1989)
- Tairrie B, Power of a Woman (1990)
- Angel Ferreira, Angel (1991)
- Candyman's Grooves, Acid Jazz (1992)
- Guru, Loungin' Remix (1993)
- Megan Mullally and Supreme Music Program, Sweetheart (1999)
- T.S.O.L., Divided We Stand (2003)
- The Diffs, Self-Titled (2005)
- The Joneses, Criminal History (2008)
- Duane Peters and the Great Unwashed, Beautiful Tragedy (2012)
- Blacklist Royals, Die Young With Me (2014)
- Tiger Army, V •••–(2016)
- T.S.O.L., The Trigger Complex (2017)
- Los Bolos, The Best of the Greatest Hits (2020)
