= James Bloor =

James Bloor may refer to:

- James Bloor (cricketer) (1857–1935), English cricketer
- James Bloor (actor) (born 1992), English actor and writer
