= Vintage Curses =

Studio album by Tairrie B
- Released: 2015
- Recorded: 2014–2015
- Genre: Hip hop
- Length: 38:00
- Label: Self-released
- Producers: Tairrie B; Josh Lynch; Micky Murphy; Joel Stooksbury

Tairrie B chronology
Power of a Woman (1990)	Vintage Curses (2015)

Vintage Curses is the second studio album by American rapper Tairrie B, released August 14, 2015 as a free download via her official Bandcamp page. The album marked her return to rap music after a hiatus of more than 20 years spent fronting the metal bands Tura Satana (a.k.a. Manhole) and My Ruin.

== Track listing ==
1. "Beware The Crone" 4:02
2. "Wicked Witch Of The West Coast" 3:58
3. "BTCHCRVFT" 3:30
4. "Ad Nauseam" 3:22
5. "Spirit Queen" 4:49
6. "Down As Dirt" 3:21
7. "Sky Above, City Below" 3:28
8. "Old School Gospel" 3:31
9. "Carpe Noctum" 3:39
10. "Devil May Care" 3:41

== Influences ==
Speaking to Vice Magazine, Tairrie B described the mood and musical stylings of Vintage Curses "I am a West Coast woman at heart and I respect the architects such as Ice T, Ice Cube, MC Ren, WC, Mack 10, King T, Low Profile, The D.O.C. and NWA. I wanted my album to reflect what I love and have listened to since the mid 80s as well as who I am today as an artist. It has an old school feel to it because I’m old school. The influence is honest"

== Singles ==
The video for the album's leading track 'Beware The Crone' was published to Tairrie B's official YouTube channel on June 15, 2015 accompanied by lyric video and album teaser In an interview with LA Weekly Tairrie discussed the song title 'Beware The Crone' and her return to rap music saying "On one hand, calling myself the 'Crone' is meant with a wink and a bit of tongue-in-cheek. On the other, I’m making a statement....Ageism has become as real as sexism and racism but — just as gender and race — has nothing to do with ability. I have never felt my art came with an expiration date." On September 16, 2015 Tairrie unveiled the 'Beware The Crone (Hecate Remix)' via SoundCloud by St Louis producer PaleFace Junkies and on October 28, 2015 Tairrie released the 'Wicked Witch Of The West Coast (Mediatrix Remix)' single via SoundCloud by British producer Nina Mediatrix
