= Bitchcraft =

Bitchcraft may refer to:

== Music ==
- Bitchcraft (album), a 2014 album by Blood on the Dance Floor
- Bitchcraft (EP), a 1998 EP by Strelnikoff
- Bitchcraft, a 1997 video by Rockbitch
- Bitchcraft, a 2022 album by Bitch
- "Bitchcraft", a 1995 song by the Electric Hellfire from Kiss the Goat
- "Bitchcraft", a 2014 song by Drake Bell from Ready Steady Go!
- "BTCHCRVFT", a 2015 song by Tairrie B from Vintage Curses
- "Bitchcraft", a 2020 song by Jax

== Television ==
- "Bitchcraft" (American Horror Story), an episode of American Horror Story: Coven
- Bitchcraft, a British web series produced by UNIT9

== Other uses ==
- "Bitchcraft", an issue of World War 3 Illustrated
- "Bitchcraft", an episode of About a Dog
