= Speak and Destroy =

Speak and Destroy may refer to:

- Speak and Destroy (album), a 1999 album by My Ruin
- Speak and Destroy (EP), a 2003 EP by Escanaba Firing Line
