= Teenage Time Killers =

American rock band

- Origin: Los Angeles, California, U.S.
- Genres: Hardcore punk; sludge metal; crossover thrash; punk rock
- Years active: 2014–present
- Label: Rise
- Members: Mick Murphy
- Past members: Reed Mullin (deceased)

Teenage Time Killers is a rock/punk supergroup formed in February 2014 by My Ruin guitarist Mick Murphy and Corrosion of Conformity drummer Reed Mullin. Guests include Dave Grohl (former drummer of Nirvana and current lead singer of the Foo Fighters), Stephen O'Malley (of Sunn O))) and Burning Witch), Corey Taylor (lead vocalist of Slipknot and founder of Stone Sour), Nick Oliveri (former bassist for Queens of the Stone Age, currently with The Dwarves), Jello Biafra (former front man of Dead Kennedys, currently with The Guantanamo School of Medicine), Matt Skiba (vocalist and guitarist of Alkaline Trio and former guitarist and vocalist for Blink-182) and Randy Blythe (lead vocalist of Lamb of God). The band's name refers to the Rudimentary Peni song of the same name. Their debut album, titled Teenage Time Killers: Greatest Hits Vol. 1, was recorded at Grohl's Studio 606, and was released July 28, 2015. through Rise Records, with whom the group signed in December 2014. The album contains a version of John Cleese's poem "Ode to Hannity," sung by Biafra. Mullin has stated that he isn't sure whether the group will tour, but that they are considering a live appearance on a show such as Jimmy Kimmel Live!, possibly with "three or four singers [coming] out at a time".

== Members ==
Current members

- Mick Murphy – guitars, bass

Past members

- Reed Mullin – drums, vocals (deceased 2020)

Guests on Teenage Time Killers: Greatest Hits Vol. 1

- Dave Grohl – bass
- Greg Anderson – guitars
- Brian Baker – guitars
- Pat "Adam Bomb" Hoed – bass
- London May – drums
- Mike Schaefer – guitars
- Mike Dean – bass
- Corey Taylor – vocals
- Randy Blythe – vocals
- Matt Skiba – vocals
- Neil Fallon – vocals
- Jello Biafra – vocals
- Lee Ving – vocals
- Mike "IX" Williams – vocals
- Tommy Victor – vocals
- Karl Agell – vocals
- Pete Stahl – vocals
- Vic Bondi – vocals
- Aaron Beam – vocals
- Clifford Dinsmore – vocals
- Phil Rind – vocals
- Tairrie B – vocals
- Tony Foresta – vocals
- Trenton Rogers – vocals
- Pat Smear – guitars, bass
- Woody Weatherman – guitars
- Jim Rota – guitars
- Jason Browning – guitars
- Nick Oliveri – bass
- Jonny Webber – vocals, composing
