= James Bloor (actor) =

English actor

- Born: 27 January 1992 (age 34); Bedford
- Education: University of Cambridge, Clare College
- Occupations: Actor, Writer
- Years active: 2015-present
- Notable work: Leatherface, Barkskins

James Bloor (born 27 January 1992) is an English writer and actor.

== Early career ==
Bloor graduated from the University of Cambridge in 2014 with a first-class degree in History and MPhil in the history of political thought.

== Career ==
In 2015, Bloor made his television debut with ITV's crime drama DCI Banks, where he played Spencer Foster.

Bloor has played one of the lead roles in the horror film Leatherface along with Sam Strike. Julien Maury and Alexandre Bustillo directed the film and it was released in 2017 by Lionsgate.

Bloor starred in the thriller film Go North along with Jacob Lofland, Sophie Kennedy Clark, and Patrick Schwarzenegger. Matthew Ogens directed the film.

Bloor wrote Soft Voice.

== Filmography ==
=== Film ===
Year	Title	Role	Notes
2016	La corrispondenza	Ragazzo	as James William Alan Bloor
2017	Leatherface	Ike	
2017	Go North	Gentry	
2017	Dunkirk	Irate Soldier	
2018	The Pagan King	Max von Buxhoeveden	original title: Nameja gredzens
2019	The Coldest Game	Agent White	
2021	Shoplifters of the World	Patrick	

=== Television ===
Year	Title	Role	Notes
2015	DCI Banks	Spencer Foster	2 episodes
2018	Less than Zero	Daniel	
2020	Barkskins	Charles Duquet	all episodes
