= Go North =

Go North may refer to:

- Go North (film), 2017 thriller film
- Go North (program), service provided by Nefesh B'Nefesh that encourages immigration to the northern part of Israel
- "Go North", 1970 song by Richard Barnes
- Welsh rugby union players switching code to rugby league
