= All Is Not Well =

Studio album by Manhole
- Released: April 16, 1996
- Recorded: 1995
- Studio: Indigo Ranch Studios (Malibu, California)
- Genre: Rap metal; nu metal
- Length: 38.20
- Label: Noise
- Producer: Ross Robinson

Tura Satana chronology
All Is Not Well (1996)	Relief Through Release (1997)

Alternative cover
- Due to a conflict with a pre-existing band, Manhole changed their name to Tura Satana, and their debut album was reissued with a different cover in 1998.

All Is Not Well is the debut studio album by American band Tura Satana. Produced by Ross Robinson, the album was initially released in 1996 when the band was still performing under the name Manhole, which they were later forced to change due to there being a pre-existing band of the same name.

== Recording ==
Tairrie B shelved her second rap album and left Ruthless Records in order to form a rap rock band where she could "rap over heavy music and address more socially conscious issues". The Los Angeles band named themselves Manhole, unaware that there had already been a Texas punk rock band of the same name who had released a seven inch record before them. The Los Angeles band Manhole caught the attention of Noise Records, who asked the Los Angeles band to be a part of their 1995 compilation The Fall and the Rise of Los Angeles, and the positive response to their appearance on the compilation led to the band signing a recording contract with the label. Subsequently, the band and the label discovered the existence of the Texas band, but Noise assured the Los Angeles band that the legal issues with the Texas band would be straightened out, and the Los Angeles band began searching for a producer for their debut album. After meeting with producers who wanted to tone down the content of Tairrie B's lyrics or replace the rest of the band with different musicians, the Los Angeles band was introduced to Ross Robinson by the band Korn, and decided to hire him as the producer for their debut, due to Manhole liking the production on Korn's debut album.

The lyrics of All Is Not Well dealt with subject matter such as rape, violence against women, abortion and racism.

Despite liking Robinson, the band were ultimately dissatisfied with his production on the album, with Tairrie B later saying that the band felt that had they worked with another producer who did not rush the album's production as they felt Robinson had, they could have made a stronger album.

== Release ==
Despite previously assuring Tairrie B's band that they would straighten out the legal issues involving the Texas band Manhole, Noise was unable to resolve the legal issues, forcing the Los Angeles band to change their name. Tairrie B chose the name Tura Satana, after the actress of the same name, due to Tairrie B finding the actress's character Varla in the film Faster, Pussycat! Kill! Kill! "empowering". The album was subsequently reissued by Noise with the cover and band name changed. The reissue added five live recordings as bonus tracks. In 2020, Tairrie B released the Manhole and Tura Satana albums for free on Bandcamp accounts, alongside additional content.

== Reception ==
Professional ratings
Review scores
Source	Rating
AllMusic	3/5 stars
Chronicles of Chaos	8/10
Collector's Guide to Heavy Metal	6/10
The Encyclopedia of Popular Music	2/5 stars
The Great Metal Discography	7/10
Kerrang!	4/5 stars
Terrorizer	4.5/5 stars

AllMusic called the album a "brutal, intense record".

== Track listing ==
All songs written by Tairrie B and Scott Ueda, except where noted.

1. "Hypocrite" — 2:33
2. "Sickness" (Tarrie B, Scott Ueda, Rico Villasenor) — 3:53
3. "Kiss or Kill" — 3:03
4. "Break" — 3:29
5. "Empty" — 2:31
6. "Put Your Head Out" — 2:55
7. "Victim" — 3:00
8. "Clean" — 3:03
9. "Roughness" (Tairrie B, Ueda, Ross Robinson, Marty Ramirez) — 2:44
10. "Six Feet Deep" — 3:01
11. "Cycle of Violence" — 3:05
12. "Down" (Ueda, Robinson, Kevin Beber, Lynn Strait) — 2:58
13. "Down (Reprise)" — 1:42

== Personnel ==
Adapted from liner notes and Bandcamp.

Manhole

- Tairrie B - Vocals
- Scott Ueda- Guitar
- Rico Villasenor - Bass
- Marcelo Palomino - Drums

Guest musicians

- Lynn Strait - vocals and lyrics on "Down"
- DJ Lethal - music on "Down (Reprise)"

Additional personnel

- Ross Robinson - Producer, Mixer
- Chuck Johnson - Engineer, Mixer
- Rob Agnello - 2nd Engineer

== Charts ==
Chart performance for All is Not Well
Chart (1996–1998)	Peak position
UK Rock & Metal Albums (OCC)	32
