= Angus Powell =

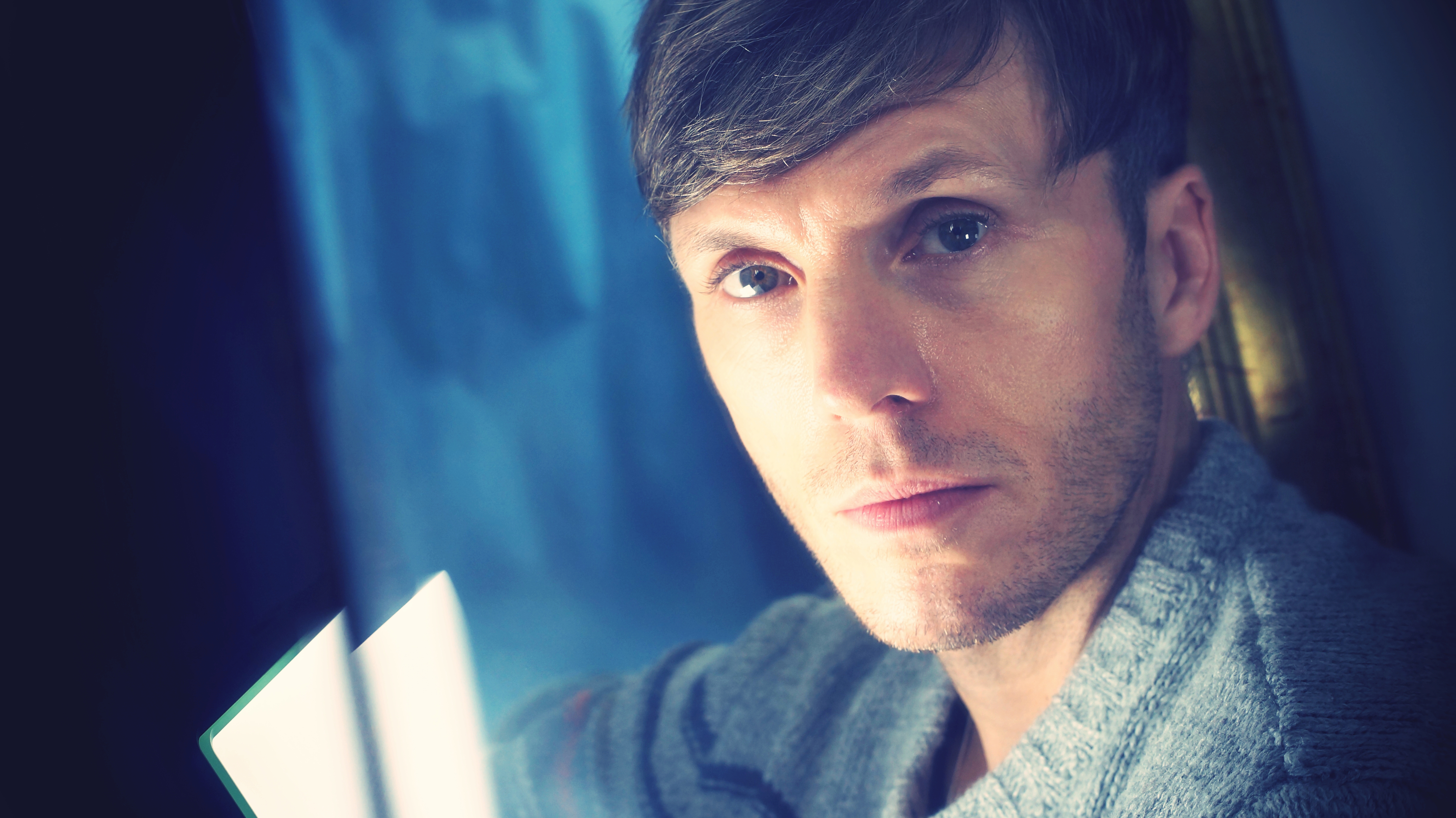

Background information
- Born: Angus John Clive Powell; High Wycombe, England
- Origin: Carno, Powys, Mid Wales
- Genres: Acoustic, folk, indie folk
- Instruments: Vocals, guitar, piano, ebow
- Years active: 2010 – present
- Labels: Warner Music UK Ltd, Rhino UK, Sony/ATV, Black Hole, Felin Records

Angus Powell is a Welsh singer, musician, songwriter and music producer.

== Career ==
Sending his music out to anyone he could, it came to the attention of Los Angeles-based film and television sync agent, Danny Benair (also formerly of The Quick and other power pop acts) who started to send his music out to music supervisors, with great reactions., Powell EP Monsters, the title track being used in worldwide TV shows Elementary (CBS), Kingdom (Audience Network) and the indie film Go North and another EP track "Hole In My Heart" being used in Bones (Fox), Finding Carter (MTV) and Idris Elba film 100 Streets.

Whilst Powell recorded his debut album with Paul Moessl producing, awareness of his music grew with KCRW in Los Angeles featuring "Monsters" as their Top Tune, and Paste Magazine premiered the video.

Halogen then followed up the EP with the release of his debut album, Before the Grey on 29 September 2017.

== Releases ==
=== EPs and albums ===
- Monsters EP (self-released, 2010)
- Waylaid EP (self-released, 2012)
- Monsters EP (re-release) (Halogen Media, 2014)
- Before The Grey Album (Halogen Media 2017)

=== Singles ===
- Monsters (self-released, 2010)
- Monsters – (re-release) (Halogen Media, Awal, 2014)
- Holding Up The Heavy – (Halogen Media, Awal, 2021)
- Grow Wings On The Way Down - (Halogen Media, Awal, 2022)
- Black Water - (Felin Records, 2023)
- Wait - (Felin Records, 2023)

=== Collaborations ===
- Already There – Angus Powell, Brian Laruso (Magic Island Deep, Black Hole, 2015)
- Not Alone – Angus Powell, Roger Shah, Brian Laruso (Magic Island Records, Black Hole, 2018)
- Go Right Through - Angus Powell, Westseven (2020)
- Headlights - Angus Powell, Jonas Saalbach (Radikon 2021)

=== Compilations ===
- 100 Streets [Original Motion Picture Soundtrack] – Various Artists

=== TV placements ===
- Elementary (CBS) – Enough Nemesis to Go Around (2014) 'Monsters'
- Kingdom (Audience network) – Please Refrain from Crying (2014) 'Monsters'
- Bones (Fox) – The Loyalty in the Lie (2015) 'Hole in my Heart'
- Finding Carter (MTV) – The Corrections (2015) 'Hole in my Heart'
- Criminal Minds (CBS) – False Flag (2017) 'Truth'
- Teen Mom: Young + Pregnant (MTV) – (Various episodes 2018–present) 'Trenches, Shiver', 'Hole In My Heart', 'Monsters', 'Pulls Me Under'
- Kingdom (Netflix) – Please Refrain from Crying (2020) 'Monsters

=== Film placements ===
- Visions (Universal Pictures) (2015) – 'Shiver'
- Soft Lad (2015) – 'Monsters', 'Shiver'
- 100 Streets (2016) – 'Hole in my Heart'
- Go North (2017) – 'Monsters'
- Daisy Winters (2017) – 'Monsters'
