= Ghosts and Good Stories =

Studio album by My Ruin
- Released: September 20, 2010
- Recorded: Entourage Studios North Hollywood, California
- Genre: Nu metal
- Length: 48:00
- Producer: Mick Murphy, Josh Lynch

My Ruin chronology
Throat Full of Heart (2008)	Ghosts and Good Stories (2010)	A Southern Revelation (2011)

Professional ratings
Review scores
Source	Rating
Louder Sound	3.5/5 stars

Ghosts and Good Stories is the sixth studio album by American metal band My Ruin, released on September 20, 2010. The album marked 10 years for the husband and wife duo Tairrie B Murphy and Mick Murphy making music together as My Ruin.

== Track listing ==
1. "Diggin' for Ghosts" - 4:34
2. "Long Dark Night" - 3:16
3. "Excommunicated" - 4:00
4. "Eyes Black" - 3:12
5. "Money Shot" - 2:53
6. "Abusing the Muse" - 3:26
7. "La Ciudad" - 4:11
8. "Suicide Tuesday" - 3:14
9. "Saviourself" - 3:46
10. "Malediction" - 3:58
11. "Repose" - 3:09
12. "Turned Out" - 4:24
13. "Death Knell" - 3:51
