= Firing Line =

Firing Line may refer to:

- Firing Line (TV program), American television series
- Firing Line (horse), American racehorse
- Firing Line: Cardiff Castle Museum of the Welsh Soldier, museum in Cardiff Castle, Cardiff, Wales, United Kingdom
- The Firing Line, a lost 1919 American silent film
- "The Firing Line", a 2023 song by Royal Blood from Back to the Water Below

== See also ==
- Fire line
- Escanaba Firing Line
