= Beneath the Shadows =

Studio album by T.S.O.L.
- Released: 1983
- Recorded: 1983
- Studios: Perspective Sound, Los Angeles
- Genre: Gothic rock • alternative rock
- Length: 33:41
- Label: Alternative Tentacles (VIRUS 29)
- Producer: Thom Wilson

T.S.O.L. chronology
Weathered Statues (1982)	Beneath the Shadows (1983)	Change Today? (1984)

Beneath the Shadows is the second studio album by the American hardcore punk band T.S.O.L. (True Sounds of Liberty), released in 1983 through Alternative Tentacles. With the addition of keyboardist Greg Kuehn to the lineup, the band moved away from punk rock in favor of a gothic rock sound in the vein of later releases by the Damned and Siouxsie and the Banshees, alienating much of their hardcore audience in the process. Though the album was critically well received and led to the band being featured in director Penelope Spheeris' film Suburbia, it was largely rejected by their fanbase within the punk scene.

By the end of the year founding members Jack Grisham and Todd Barnes had left the group. They were respectively replaced by singer Joe Wood and drummer Mitch Dean, with whom T.S.O.L. would continue further from punk rock, eventually becoming a glam rock outfit. The original four members reacquired rights to the name T.S.O.L. in 1999 and signed to Nitro Records, who re-released Beneath the Shadows and put out the band's two subsequent studio albums.

== Background ==
T.S.O.L. had released their first full-length album, Dance with Me, in 1981 through Frontier Records. Its combination of hardcore punk with horror film- and gothic-inspired subject matter had put the band at the forefront of what was becoming known as "Death Rock". Their subsequent EP, 1982's Weathered Statues, was released through Alternative Tentacles, the record label run by Jello Biafra and East Bay Ray of fellow California hardcore band the Dead Kennedys, with whom T.S.O.L. had performed. The experimental nature and melodic leanings of the EP presaged the musical direction the band would pursue on their next album.

With the addition of keyboardist Greg Kuehn to the lineup, the band expanded in new creative directions. According to singer Jack Grisham, improved musicianship and new musical influences were also factors in T.S.O.L.'s stylistic changes:

We learned to play. We wanted to try more things. We're not going to pretend we're something that we're not anymore. It's funny, [bassist] Mike Roche got mad at me for doing what I did, but he's the one who turned me on to Roxy Music. After hearing different singers and music I'd never heard before, you're bound to expand.

Beneath the Shadows was recorded at Perspective Sound in Los Angeles with producer Thom Wilson. It was released in 1983 through Alternative Tentacles as catalog number VIRUS 29. Grisham credited himself as Jack Delauge on the sleeve, following a tradition of using a different pseudonym on each release both to confuse audiences and to hide his true identity from the police. Drummer Todd Barnes credited himself as Todd Scrivener, a pseudonym he had also used on Weathered Statues derived from the name of the street he lived on.

== Reception ==
Beneath the Shadows received positive reviews from critics. AllMusic's Bradley Torreano remarks that the album "blew away all the preconceived notions about the group's sound. T.S.O.L. had put out a record that equaled Meat Loaf when it came to sheer sonic pomposity but still retained their gothic punk leanings. Fans were mildly confused, but the band garnered rave reviews". Robert Christgau gave the album a "B" score, criticizing Grisham's lyrics as uninteresting but calling the musicality "so robust and determined it blows all suspicions of nostalgia away."

Joe Viglione of AllMusic rated the album 4½ stars out of 5, likening it to "Orchestral Maneuvers in the Dark battling the Clash". He praised Wilson's production, Grisham's questioning vocals, and the clever nuances of Kuehn's keyboards: "Rather than merely copying, T.S.O.L. are exploring. The anti-thesis of 'The Sound of Philadelphia' by MFSB from the disco decade before, there's enough slashing strings and artistry here to satisfy the most rabid fan of true rock & roll when college radio and rock stations forget what they're supposed to be playing. It's there in the evaporated love turned to anger in 'Wash Away', as well as on the closing garage sounds of 'Waiting for You'. Heartbroken choruses which garner the band a Grade A for this excellent effort."

Such positive reviews led T.S.O.L. to be included, along with fellow Southern California punk groups D.I. and The Vandals, in director Penelope Spheeris' film Suburbia (1983). T.S.O.L. appears in the film performing "Wash Away" from Beneath the Shadows and "Darker My Love", an otherwise unreleased song.

Despite the warm critical reception, the band's change in musical direction confused and alienated their hardcore audiences. Mike Boehm of the Los Angeles Times commented that "Beneath the Shadows was drenched in rainy romanticism accented by glistening piano and synthesizer shimmers. The album disregarded punk's sonic and attitudinal boundaries and effectively ended the punk chapter of T.S.O.L.'s career." Steven Blush, author of American Hardcore: A Tribal History, writes that "the experimental nature of '82's Weathered Statues EP bewildered some fans, but T.S.O.L. lost their hard-to-please fanbase overnight with '83's Beneath the Shadows LP. As a wave of hardcore bands tried a more 'mature' sound in the vein of The Damned, it made sense at the time, but constituted a suicidal career move. Too bad, as Beneath the Shadows sounded powerful and progressive." According to Grisham, the use of synthesizers was unpopular with the hardcore punk crowd:

The trouble with being a popular band is that all your changes are aired for the public. So yeah, we ventured and a lot of the stuff went too far. But how do you know where you are if you don't go too far? Using synthesizers wasn't popular with hardcore. To be honest, a lot of the synth sounds at that time weren't very good, but we went for it. I've met a lot of people who say "That record was cool." At the time, it was...for me, at least.

Critic Jack Rabid, editor of The Big Takeover, has called Beneath the Shadows "one of the finest U.S. post-punk LPs ever" and cites audiences' rejection of it as a turning point in his dissatisfaction with hardcore:

Beneath the Shadows being rejected by the hardcore scene was the final straw for me, after many, many straws. Here was this most fascinating outgrowth of punk — they could've been our Damned or Siouxsie and the Banshees — retaining the original guts and drive, taking it into this unique direction. The hardcore audience rejected them, the rock & roll audience figured they were still hardcore, so there was no audience for the music. They broke up. It was a very bad time. It became a rugby game with no meaning.

== Band changes and re-release ==
Grisham and Barnes both quit T.S.O.L. in late 1983. Grisham cited increased violence and police presence at shows, as well as audiences looking to him for instruction, as factors in his departure. He renounced hardcore to continue in the musical direction of Beneath the Shadows, playing with the keyboard-driven Cathedral of Tears and then with Barnes in Tender Fury. Kuehn also did not stay with T.S.O.L. past Beneath the Shadows, going on to other musical credits including playing with Bob Dylan. Guitarist Ron Emory and bassist Mike Roche continued on as T.S.O.L., bringing in singer Joe Wood and drummer Mitch Dean. Over the course of four more studio albums, the new T.S.O.L. lineup would take the band's style even further from punk rock, moving first in a gothic rock direction, then into hard rock and glam rock before dissolving in 1990.

The original T.S.O.L. lineup of Grisham, Emory, Roche, and Barnes reunited in 1991 and won back legal rights to the band's name in 1999. They signed to Nitro Records, who re-released Beneath the Shadows. Though Barnes died in 2000, the band continued on with other drummers and released two studio albums on Nitro, with Kuehn returning for 2003's Divided We Stand. Of the ten songs from Beneath the Shadows, only "Wash Away" and the title track were included on releases by the reunited lineup: A live recording of "Wash Away" appears on Live '91 (1991), and a re-recorded version appears on Who's Screwin' Who? (2005). Live recordings of "Beneath the Shadows" and "Wash Away" are also included on Live from Long Beach (2008). Alkaline Trio covered "Wash Away" for the soundtrack of the 2005 video game Tony Hawk's American Wasteland.

== Track listing ==
All tracks are written by Jack Grisham, Ron Emory, Mike Roche, Todd Barnes, and Greg Kuehn

Side A
No.	Title	Length
1.	"Soft Focus"	3:33
2.	"Forever Old"	2:51
3.	"She'll Be Saying"	2:48
4.	"Beneath the Shadows"	3:51
5.	"Send My Thoughts"	2:46

Side B
No.	Title	Length
1.	"Glass Streets"	4:39
2.	"Other Side"	2:53
3.	"Walk Alone"	3:50
4.	"Wash Away"	3:44
5.	"Waiting for You"	2:46
Total length:		33:41

== Personnel ==
Band

- Jack Grisham – vocals (credited as Jack Delauge)
- Ron Emory – guitars
- Mike Roche – bass guitar
- Todd Barnes – drums (credited as Todd Scrivener)
- Greg Kuehn – keyboards

Production

- Thom Wilson – record producer
- Mike Zoto – executive producer
- Michael Rubin – photography and cover art
