= The Horror of Beauty =

Studio album by My Ruin
- Released: 2003
- Recorded: Rock Falcon; Hollywood, CA; The Deadstone; Hollywood, CA
- Genres: Alternative metal, nu metal
- Label: Century Media
- Producers: Nick Raskulinecz; Mick Murphy; Todd Osenbrugh

My Ruin chronology
To Britain with Love... and Bruises (2001)	The Horror of Beauty (2003)	The Brutal Language (2005)

The Horror of Beauty is a full-length album by the metal band My Ruin. It was released in 2003.

== Critical reception ==
Professional ratings
Review scores
Source	Rating
AllMusic	4/5 stars
Chronicles of Chaos	4/10

Chronicles of Chaos wrote that "no amount of musical invention would be able to drown out [Tairrie] B's relentlessly self-obsessed and tiresome whining." CMJ New Music Report called the album "the most dirt-encrusted rock Miss B has ever attempted," writing that My Ruin "walks the razor's edge between subversive femininity and pro-womanhood."

== Track listing ==
1. "Stage Fright" - 1:18
2. "Made to Measure" - 4:41
3. "American Psycho" - 4:02
4. "Spitfire" - 2:37
5. "Burn the Witch" - 3:25
6. "Radio Silence" - 3:31
7. "Hot in the House of God" - 3:40
8. "Nazimova" - 3:18
9. "Stinkface" - 2:52
10. "Weightless" - 2:36
11. "Bravenet" - 6:27
12. "Ten Minutes to Hollywood" - 3:45
13. "Get Pretty" - 3:28
14. "Rid of Me" (PJ Harvey cover) - 4:15

== Extra content ==
Also included on the CD are two videos that can be viewed by playing the disc through a computer: the promotional video for "Made To Measure" and a behind-the-scenes film of the making of the video.

== Personnel ==
- Tairrie B – vocals/lyrics
- Mick Murphy – guitars, producer on tracks 1, 2, 3, 4, 7, 10, 11, 12, 13 and 14
- Meghan Mattox – bass guitar
- Yael – drums
- Nick Raskulinecz – producer, engineer and mixer on tracks 5, 6, 8 and 9
- Roy Mayorga – recorded vocals on track 5
- Todd Osenbrugh – producer and engineer on tracks 1, 2, 3, 4, 7, 10, 11, 12, 13 and 14
- Lisa Klassen – engineer on tracks 1, 2, 3, 4, 7, 10, 11, 12, 13 and 14
- Roger Lian – mastering
