= Confessions of a Superhero =

- Directed by: Matthew Ogens
- Produced by: Matthew Ogens; Charlie Gruet
- Starring: Christopher Dennis; Jennifer Wenger; Joseph McQueen; Maxwell Allen
- Music by: Greg Kuehn
- Release dates: March 10, 2007 (SXSW); November 2, 2007 (United States)
- Running time: 92 minutes
- Country: United States
- Language: English

Confessions of a Superhero is a 2007 American documentary film directed by Matthew Ogens. The film documents the lives of four subjects who make a living performing as costumed superheroes on the Hollywood Walk of Fame.

== Synopsis ==
The film follows the lives of four main subjects through interviews with themselves, their friends, and their family members: Christopher Dennis, Jennifer Wenger, Joseph McQueen and Maxwell Allen, who portray Superman, Wonder Woman, the Hulk, and Batman, respectively. Each is an aspiring actor from a different background who earns a living posing for photographs with tourists outside of Grauman's Chinese Theatre in Hollywood.

Dennis grew up in Los Angeles as an orphan but claims to be the son of Academy Award-winning actress Sandy Dennis, whose family denies in the film that she ever had any children. Wenger was a small-town cheerleader before moving to Hollywood to pursue an acting career. McQueen moved to Los Angeles during the 1992 Los Angeles riots, was homeless for four years before performing as the Hulk, and becomes the most successful of the subjects, securing a small role in Justin Lin's Finishing the Game. Allen claims to be a former mobster with a violent past, although his wife and others interviewed in the film express doubts about the truthfulness of his stories.

As the film progresses, it explores the subjects' struggles with financial insecurity, personal relationships and the pursuit of fame.

== Reception ==
The film was well received by critics, and was an official selection at the 2007 SXSW film festival, and an official selection at the AFI fest. The review aggregator website Rotten Tomatoes reports an approval rating of 100% based on eleven reviews, with an average rating of 7.70 out of 10.
