= Manhole (band) =

American punk rock band from Houston

- Origin: Houston, Texas, U.S.
- Genres: Punk rock; hard rock
- Years active: 1991–1995 (Note: One-off reunions: 2005, 2011, 2012, 2016, 2023)
- Labels: Direct Hit
- Past members: Allison Gibson; Eev Rodriguez; Chris Nine; Beth Shaffer; D. Lavon; Joanne; Leah

Manhole was an American punk rock band from Houston, Texas.

== History ==
Manhole was formed in Houston in the summer of 1991 after bassist Eev Rodriguez met a drummer called Joanne at a venue called Pik n Pak and was asked to try out for an all-female band she was forming. She, Joanne and a guitarist called Leah held a few jam sessions playing songs by Danzig and Scorpions before meeting vocalist Allison Gibson, who heard them practicing and asked if she could join. After Leah and Joanne left Manhole due to creative differences, Rodriguez switched over to guitar and bassist Chris Nine joined in 1992. The band then signed with local independent record label Direct Hit Records, whose founder Rodriguez had worked with in the past. The band went through numerous drummers before settling on Beth Shaffer.

In late 1992, Manhole released a three-song extended play which garnered positive reviews from national fanzines. Rodriguez said that, despite it selling well internationally, Manhole did not send the EP to record labels as they wanted to given them a stronger release to show how serious they were. Initially scheduled for release in the summer of 1993, Manhole's eponymous debut album was delayed for several months, which Rodriguez blamed on the music industry around Houston. The album was ultimately released on November 25, 1994, which Manhole celebrated with a "release party" at Fitzgerald's. The Houston Press listed the album as one of the best local CDs of 1994. Thereafter, Manhole were forced into debt when Direct Hit went bankrupt and disbanded in August 1995.

In 1997, Manhole won a copyright infringement lawsuit against a Los Angeles band of the same name, who later renamed themselves Tura Satana. Gibson and Rodriguez claimed to have filed the suit in response to the band taunting them during two performances in Houston in late 1996, with vocalist Tairrie B throwing water on a fan wearing one of their t-shirts following a concert at The Abyss. As part of the settlement, the Los Angeles band's record label, Noise Records, was forced to surrender all of their merchandise, posters and albums to Gibson and Rodriguez, who planned to burn all of it in a bonfire. In December 2005, Manhole performed a one-off show in Houston as part of Island of the Misfit Boytoys, a concert intended to show off female punk musicians. In 2011, Manhole were featured in the documentary film When We Ruled H-Town, covering the 1990s Houston music scene. The band reunited for a show previewing the documentary in February 2011, and again following its DVD release in August 2012. The band played additional reunion shows in 2016 and 2023.

== Musical style ==
We write songs about experiences women—not only women—but people go through [...] A lot of people don't want to hear about incest or rape, but I think these things need to be talked about.

—Eev Rodriguez

Manhole were a punk rock and hard rock band; they initially played three-chord punk songs before pursuing a heavier sound. Lyrically, the band's songs were politically charged and addressed topics including racism, sexism, incest and rape. In a 1993 interview, Rodriguez said that although Manhole were "politically and socially aware" and identified as feminists, they did not consider themselves part of the riot grrrl movement.

== Band members ==
Final lineup
- Allison Gibson - lead vocals (1991–1995, 2005, 2011, 2012, 2016, 2023)
- Eev Rodriguez - guitar, vocals (1992–1995, 2005, 2011, 2012, 2016, 2023), bass (1991–1992)
- Chris Nine - bass, vocals (1992–1995, 2005, 2011, 2012, 2016, 2023)
- Beth Shaffer - drums (1993–1995, 2005, 2011, 2012, 2016, 2023)
Past members
- Leah - guitar (1991–1992)
- Joanne - drums (1991–1992)
- D. Lavon - drums (1992–1993)

== Discography ==
=== Studio albums ===
List of studio albums, with selected details
Title	Album details
Manhole	Released: November 25, 1994; Label: Direct Hit; Format: CD

=== Extended plays ===
List of EPs, with selected details
Title	EP details
Final Blow	Released: 1992; Label: Direct Hit; Format: 7" single
