= Soft Voice =

Thriller podcast

Soft Voice is a psychological thriller podcast written by James Bloor and produced by QCode. The show stars Bel Powley, Naomi Scott, and Olivia Cooke and won a 2022 Ambies award.

== Background ==
Soft Voices is a psychological thriller podcast produced by QCode. The podcast was written by James Bloor and was recorded over Zoom during the COVID-19 pandemic. The show stars Bel Powley, Naomi Scott, and Olivia Cooke. The podcast contains 10 episodes that are each about 30 minutes long. The episodes were released on a weekly basis. The show covers sensitive topics such as mental illness. The show follows a character named Lydia and her two conflicting internal voices—soft voice and dark voice. Soft Voice won "Best Scriptwriting, Fiction" at the 2022 Ambies.
