= Big Disco =

Studio album by Escanaba Firing Line
- Released: December 12, 2006
- Recorded: 2004–2005
- Studio: Woodshed Studios, Oak Park, Michigan
- Genre: Progressive rock; post-rock; experimental; indie rock
- Length: 56:18
- Label: ThinkTank Records
- Producer: Escanaba Firing Line

Escanaba Firing Line chronology
Live At Short's (2006)	Big Disco (2006)	Live at the Belmont (2010)

Big Disco is Escanaba Firing Line's first full-length studio album, released in 2006. The album was recorded at Woodshed Studios in Oak Park, Michigan with Tim Pak and features artwork and design by Jesse Younce.

== Track listing ==
All songs written and performed by Escanaba Firing Line.

1. "Broken Beat" – 3:36
2. "Terra Incognito" – 3:33
3. "Moderate Rock Tempo" – 2:47
4. "a little island" – 5:03
5. "Dakota" – 5:15
6. "pinot noir" – 5:52
7. "Awkward Child" – 2:33
8. "Instrumental" – 4:47
9. "False Start" – 11:19
  - 'Intellectual' (hidden track)
  - "In a Valley, On a River" (hidden track)

== Personnel ==
Escanaba Firing Line

- Jesse Younce – guitar, vocals
- Ryan Younce – guitar, vocals, bass (on "In a Valley, On a River")
- Tony Colombo – bass
- Jeremy VanSice – drums (4, 6–8, 11)
- Luke Purcell – drums (1–3, 5, 9), keys (5)

Production

- Tim Pak - engineering, mixing
- The Flying Pauleini Brothers – mixing
- Jesse Younce – art and design
- Jim Ribby – "Civil War Trilogy" sampled on "pinot noir"
- S. Miller – spirit guide
- Matthew James Wind – additional audio samples
