= Throat Full of Heart =

Studio album by My Ruin
- Released: January 18, 2008
- Recorded: The Hobby Shop in Highland Park, California
- Labels: Rovena Recordings; Cargo Records
- Producer: Mick Murphy

My Ruin chronology
The Brutal Language (2005)	Throat Full of Heart (2008)	Ghosts and Good Stories (2010)

Professional ratings
Review scores
Source	Rating
Thrash Hits	link
Rock Hard	6/10 stars

Throat Full of Heart is the fifth album by American heavy metal band My Ruin, released in January 2008. It includes artwork by vocalist Tairrie B, along with My Ruin's first ever full-length DVD with the music videos for "Ready for Blood" and "Religiosity" with bonus and behind-the-scenes footage of The Making of RFB by the guitarist Mick Murphy. The disc also includes a mini-movie of My Ruin In the Studio with never before seen footage of Tairrie B recording vocals for the new album and a very personal video/photo film she put together documenting her accident from the injury to the recovery.

== Track listing ==
1. "Ready for Blood" – 4:40
2. "Memento Mori" – 3:55
3. "Skeleton Key" – 3:53
4. "Me Without You" – 3:41
5. "Religiosity" – 4:26
6. "Slide You the Horn" – 3:35
7. "Not This Time" – 4:18
8. "Dragon Steel" – 3:21
9. "Nothing Is Sacred" – 4:00
10. "Through the Wound" – 4:49
