= Meet the Hitlers =

- Film poster
- Directed by: Matthew Ogens
- Produced by: Matthew Ogens
- Starring: David Gardner; Deborah Campbell; Hitler Gonzales; Romano Hitler; Emily Hittler
- Cinematography: Charles Gruet
- Music by: Greg Kuehn
- Release date: October 18, 2014 (New Orleans)
- Language: English

Meet the Hitlers is a 2014 documentary film about people around the world who share the name Hitler. The executive producer of the film was Morgan Spurlock.

== See also ==
- Heath Hitler
