= Heath Hitler =

White supremacist (born 1973)

- Born: Isidore Heath Campbell; 1973 (age 52–53)
- Other name: Nazi Dad
- Known for: Naming his son "Adolf Hitler Campbell"
- Political party: Hitler's Order

Isidore Heath Hitler (né Campbell; born 1973), sometimes called Nazi Dad, is an American white supremacist and self-described Neo-Nazi who attracted national media attention in December 2008 after the ShopRite in Greenwich Township, New Jersey, refused to make a cake celebrating his son Adolf Hitler Campbell's third birthday. A Walmart in Nazareth, Pennsylvania later baked and inscribed the cake. Hitler (then known as Heath Campbell) was featured in a documentary, Meet the Hitlers. He is also founder and leader of the pro-Nazi group Hitler's Order.

== Child-naming controversy ==
Rachel Maddow opined that it was ironic Walmart would bake a cake reading "Happy birthday Adolf Hitler" but would not sell Dixie Chicks albums because of profane lyrics. Forensic psychologist N.G. Berill claimed, "To strap a kid with that kind of name is incredibly abusive and short-sighted."

== Appearance and habits ==
Hitler has several Nazi-related tattoos and a toothbrush mustache to resemble Nazi dictator Adolf Hitler. When he was younger he sported long brown hair, but now keeps it in a short trimmed undercut hairstyle, typical of Nazi Germany during the Second World War. The swastika tattoo on his neck was criticized in The Young Turks as poorly drawn by the tattoo artist. However, the show concluded by a 2–1 vote that Hitler's children should be returned to him, with Cenk Uygur arguing, "You should be allowed to be a Nazi, neo-Nazi, any kind of thing, according to the First Amendment. Now if we say, 'Hey, you're allowed to do that, but we're gonna take your kids away,' I would argue that that's a very interesting First Amendment case, at the very least." When questioned about his tattoos, Hitler pointed out that he also has a yin yang tattoo and that the Nazis were not the only ones to use swastikas as a symbol.

Hitler began wearing a Nazi uniform in June 2012, when he founded the Hitler's Order. His landlord described the family as clean and non-destructive.

== Relationships and children ==
Hitler has had nine children with five women. One of his wives was Cathy Bowlby, who claimed Hitler beat her repeatedly and wanted to name his first-born son Lucifer until she convinced him to name him Heath.

Hitler's third wife was Deborah Campbell (born Deborah Lynn McCollum). According to a birth certificate, Adolf Hitler Campbell was born to them at 6:20 am on December 14, 2005 at Hunterdon Medical Center in Raritan Township, New Jersey. Their other children are JoyceLynn Aryan Nation, Honszlynn Hinler Jeannie, and Heinrich Hons. The latter was taken by Child Protective Services from them hours after being born.

Hitler also had a child, Eva Lynn Patricia Braun, with girlfriend Bethanie Rose Zito (AKA Bethanie White), who later became his fiancée when she was 22 years old. Hitler and Zito both went to a custody hearing wearing Nazi regalia.

Based on anonymous reports of violence, all of Hitler's children have been taken away by New Jersey's Division of Youth and Family Services and put in foster care. However, he has said that he will continue having kids as long as the government keeps taking them away. According to a lehighvalleylive article:

Zito, Deborah Campbell and Heath Campbell share a home in Holland Township, said Heath Campbell, who made international headlines in 2008 upon revelations that he named his children after Nazi figures.

Heath Campbell said he is not divorced from Deborah Campbell and lives with her and his girlfriend.

"They're like sisters," he said today. "They fight. Make up. Fight. Make up. That's how things go. It's a family thing." . . . .

Heath Campbell said he was not involved in Monday's dispute and didn't know what it was about.

"They both got in a spat. They were arguing. I left the house," he said. "Deborah went her own way."

As of June 2012, Hitler and Deborah were separated. An ABC News article says:

A neighbor turned over a handwritten note signed by Deborah Campbell, who dropped out of the 10th grade, that accused her husband of trying to kill her and expressed fear for her children's safety. The note, replete with spelling errors, said, "He thrend to have me killed or kill me himself hes alread tried it a few times. I'm scare to leave b/c I will be killed. I'm afread that he might hurt my children if they are keeptd in his care. He's already stabbed me with a screwdriver in the hand. He teaches my son how to kill someone at the age of 3." Asked about the letter during court custody proceedings, Deborah Campbell admitted that she wrote it but testified it was all a lie. She described her husband as "a perfect guy."

According to that article, "One of his ex-wives has a restraining order against him and has moved to an Air Force base with family in Florida to be away and safe from him, court papers said."

== Legal issues ==
At a June 3, 2013, court hearing, Campbell appeared in a Nazi uniform and said, "If they're good judges and they're good people, they'll look within, not what's on the outside."

Campbell was arrested on March 10, 2016 in Shippensburg, Pennsylvania and ordered held in lieu of $10,000 cash bond. He pleaded guilty in Superior Court to obstruction of justice and resisting arrest. He was sentenced to 180 days in jail and two years of probation. The charges stemmed from a report of domestic violence by Zito which she later recanted.

Specifically, Zito said her injuries weren't inflicted by Campbell as she originally claimed. She said he left after an argument and she was mad at him so she went to work in a shed. While there, she was throwing things around, and a shelf held up by a few nails fell on her, cutting her face She said she'd claimed Hitler caused the injury in retaliation for his leaving her for another woman. Another account Zito gave was that she collided with Deborah: "Technically, when she hit me, it was my fault. I'm the one who slipped downstairs into her elbow. We were both on the stairs."

Prosecutors proceeded without Zito's cooperation and charged Hitler (then named Campbell) with aggravated assault. He was extradited to New Jersey after having been on the list of most-wanted fugitives. Although earlier news stories said that he could not read, in August 2016 he claimed to have written Mein Kampf III and IV while in jail, and announced his intention to publish the new volumes after he finished working on them. In February 2017, on Valentine's Day, he filed to high court to legally change his last name to Hitler. A hearing was held on March 24 and the name change was approved on May 8.
