= The Birds of Satan =

American rock band

- Origin: Los Angeles, CA
- Genres: Hard rock, progressive rock, alternative rock, power pop
- Years active: 2014–2022
- Labels: Shanabelle Records, Kobalt
- Past members: Taylor Hawkins; Wiley Hodgden; Mick Murphy
- Website: Official website

The Birds of Satan were an American progressive hard rock supergroup, assembled in 2014 as a side-project led by Taylor Hawkins of the Foo Fighters. The band was also composed of members Wiley Hodgden and Mick Murphy who previously played with Hawkins in the cover band Chevy Metal.

== History ==
The Birds of Satan formed as an evolution of former cover band Chevy Metal.

The band's self-titled debut album was released on April 15, 2014 and pays tribute to seventies artists such as Queen, David Bowie, Wings, Alice Cooper, Van Halen, and Aerosmith. Fellow Foo Fighters band members Dave Grohl, Rami Jaffee, and Pat Smear are featured on the album alongside the band, while Hawkins' school friend and Yes vocalist Jon Davison also appears. Prior to the album's release, the band released a promotional single titled, "Thanks for the Line."

== Band members ==
- Taylor Hawkins – vocals, drums
- Wiley Hodgden – bass
- Mick Murphy – guitar

== Discography ==
- The Birds of Satan (15 April 2014)
- Be the Bird (single - 23 September 2014)

=== Track listing ===
No.	Title	Writer(s)	Length
1.	"The Ballad of the Birds of Satan"	Dave Grohl, Taylor Hawkins, Andrew Hester, Wiley Hodgden, John Lousteau, Mick Murphy	9:31
2.	"Thanks for the Line"	Hawkins, Hester, Hodgden, Lousteau, Murphy	3:40
3.	"Pieces of the Puzzle"	Hawkins, Hester, Hodgden, Lousteau, Murphy	4:45
4.	"Raspberries"	Jon Davison, Grohl, Hawkins, Hester, Hodgden, Rami Jaffee, Lousteau, Murphy	4:08
5.	"Nothing at All"	Hawkins, Hester, Hodgden, Lousteau, Murphy	2:57
6.	"Wait Til Tomorrow"	Grohl, Hawkins, Hester, Hodgden, Lousteau, Murphy	3:13
7.	"Too Far Gone to See"	Hawkins, Hester, Hodgden, Lousteau, Pat Smear	5:45
Total length:			33:59
