= My Ruin =

American alternative metal band

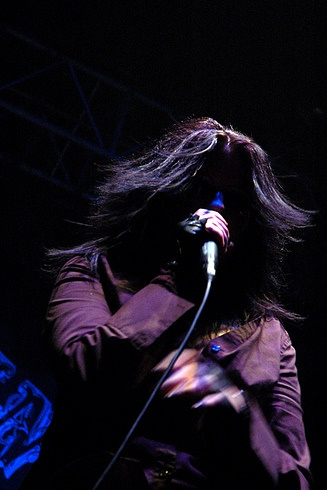
- Singer Tairrie B performing in 2008

Background information
- Origin: Los Angeles, California, U.S.
- Genres: Alternative metal; nu metal
- Years active: 1999–2014: 2025–present
- Labels: Snapper/Madfish; Spitfire; Century; Undergroove; Rovena; Cargo; Tiefdruck
- Members: Tairrie B Murphy; Mick Murphy

My Ruin is an American alternative metal band from Los Angeles, California, composed of the husband and wife duo Tairrie B and Mick Murphy. The band has been through various lineup changes since its formation in 1999. The band's sound consists of passionate vocals and heavy rock beats, with most of the fanbase in the UK. Vocalist Tairrie B has cultivated a reputation both on and off the stage for her aggressive performances and acerbic vocal style. The band's sound has evolved and become heavier with each album, and Murphy's guitar playing becoming a prominent feature along with his solos and riffs.

My Ruin are a "DIY" band who have control over every aspect of their output. In the past they have released several of their records via their own imprint, Rovena Recordings. These records include; The Brutal Language (2005), Throat Full of Heart (2008), and the live album Alive On the Other Side (2008). They have also been signed to numerous record labels, including Snapper, Spitfire, Century Media, Undergroove Records, Rovena Recordings, and Tiefdruck-Musik.

== History ==
=== Formation of My Ruin solo project and debut release; Speak and Destroy (1999–2000) ===
My Ruin was founded by frontwoman Tairrie B in February 1999, shortly after her previous outfit, Tura Satana, disbanded in late 1998 after the release of their second studio album, Relief Through Release.

Tairrie immediately started making plans for her next musical incarnation, which would be a solo project. Of the project in early 1999, Tairrie stated: "The band won't just be called Tairrie B, but it will be a solo thing – just like Nine Inch Nails is really just Trent Reznor… It's all down to me now. If it fails, then I won't have anyone else to blame."

The recording for Speak and Destroy started in February 1999.

Speak and Destroy, released on August 23, 1999 in the UK and Europe, would see Tairrie explore previously uncharted musical territory. The album would be an experimental amalgamation of styles, part spoken word, part metal, part industrial with electronic stylings; there are also some rap metal-style verses. The album received highly favorable reviews from the mainstream rock press, with the likes of Kerrang! rating the album 4k's out of 5.

Also, many journalists noted that the album was the perfect showcase for the "multi-faceted character" of Tairrie B and her perceived volatile persona, Kerrang! magazine stated: "With My Ruin the volatile vocalist has finally found a worthy platform for her talents."

The album and subsequent singles also charted high in the UK charts.

The collage of different styles on the record may have been due in part to the fact that the recording took place in four different locations around the world, with different musicians and bands contributing to the recording, writing and production. At the time in an interview, Tairrie said: "Bushaq recorded some of the songs here in England, Mel and I did some with Joe Bishara, Ares from downset. did some and Joe Bishara did some with Tura Satana. So there were four completely different scenarios."

Amidst the chaos, Tairrie found her main song-writing partner and guitarist in Melanie Makaiwi. Of the partnership and friendship that formed between the pair Tairrie said: "I probably enjoyed doing the stuff with Mel most of all. It was generally me going, 'okay, this is the scenario. What do I need to do?'. Melanie was writer, producer, artist, therapist, mentor, best friend, drink technician and drug partner on this album. She was everything a girl could be." Further to this, Tairrie cited Makaiwi as the one who led Tairrie to explore a more restrained vocal style than what she was used to: "Working with Melanie was a very cool influence because when we started working together it started as a very casual, experimental vibe. She'd say, 'You don't need to scream on everything, you need to try something different'."

==== Sick with It and 8mm film soundtrack ====
The track Sick with It went on to feature on the soundtrack for the Nicolas Cage film 8mm. The track was written with Tairrie's previous musical cohorts Tura Satana for inclusion on Speak and Destroy. In an early interview promoting Speak and Destroy, Tairrie revealed that she and her Tura Satana bandmates were still on good terms: "It's not like when we fired Scott (Udea, former Tura Satana guitarist). Me and the guys still hang out together."

In another interview regarding the song, Tairrie revealed that there are two versions of the song, the one on Speak and Destroy and the one on 8mm soundtrack: "The three Tura Satana guys [bassist Rico Villasenor, guitarist Brian Harrah and drummer Marcelo Palomino] are involved, and I've got Grady Avenell [vocals] and Michael Martin [bass] from Will Haven [who've just finished recording their second album 'WHVN'] on a track called 'Sick With It'. This was written by Brian Harrah, and a different version is on the soundtrack for the new Nicolas Cage movie 8MM."

==== Singles "Terror" and "Tainted Love" ====
Speak and Destroy spawned two singles: "Tainted Love" backed with "Blasphemous Girl", released in July 1999 and Terror backed with June 10, released in October 1999.

The singles were released on both CD and limited edition numbered vinyl. 1,000 copies of the Tainted Love single was released on red vinyl and 1,000 copies of the Terror single were released on standard vinyl.

The Tainted Love CD single was a three track single featuring the Tainted Love cover "Blasphemous Girl" and spoken word track "Scars".

The Terror CD single was a three track single of remixed versions of "Terror" (Trilogy Edit), "June 10" (Martyr Edit) and also a live studio recording of the Snot track, "Stoopid".

The track "Terror" somewhat bridged the gap between Tairrie's previous album, because it was a re-working of a hidden spoken word track at the end of Relief Through Release. The track also served as a statement of intent, kicking against the naysayers who said she was crazy for splitting up Tura Satana and that it would ultimately be her ruin. At the end of Terror, Tairrie states: "No one is going to ruin me; if I have to, I will ruin myself—and it will be My Ruin." This has served as a personal mantra for Tairrie through the years regarding the band.

==== Tainted Love and Stoopid covers ====
Following the tradition of recording and performing the occasional cover song throughout Tairrie's career, going back as far as Tairrie's days in Manhole, where she covered the song Hard Times by punk/thrash band Cro-Mags, the band covered Tainted Love and Stoopid.

Another cover which featured on Tairrie's Relief Through Release record was Negative Creep by Nirvana.

For Speak and Destroy, Tairrie would do her own interpretation of the much covered song Tainted Love. The song would go on to haunt the band many years later with fans requesting it live and Tairrie and Mick refusing and showing disdain for the song, which no longer fit with the ethos, vibe or feel of the band. This was made clear in many interviews.

In an interview in 1999, when asked why she did the cover of Tainted Love Tairrie simply stated: "I wanted to piss everybody off. We were listening to an old '80s tape on the way to the studio and I thought it suited what we were doing."

The track was originally made famous by Gloria Jones in 1965 and perhaps more memorably by Soft Cell in 1981. Marilyn Manson would later cover the song in 2001.

The cover of Stoopid was a tribute to Tairrie's very good friend Lynn Strait, Snot front-man, who had died in December 1998. In an interview with Kerrang! in 2000, Tairrie said of the cover: "When Lynn died on the same day as my Grandfather my band decided to cover 'Stoopid' when we went on tour. That was kind of my way of dealing with the grief that I was feeling."

==== Terror video and possible existence of unseen June 10 video ====
In a Kerrang! magazine feature from 1999, the magazine revealed that My Ruin had been busy recording two videos in London's Electrowerkz. The two videos and tracks in question were single Terror which was released to coincide with the release of the single and June 10, which to date has never surfaced. Both videos were said to be directed by photographer Paul Harries.

The June 10 video was mentioned again on myruin.com, when Tairrie was answering fan questions sent to her via email and on the then myruin.com message board. She said in relation to a tour video/DVD documenting the My Beautiful Pain Tour: "I might be going back to England mid November to edit down the tour video. I will be doing it with the guys who did the "TERROR" video with me. This is not for sure because I kind of want to stay in LA and edit but it may not be an option. The video will include lots of live footage, fans, backstage, and the bands we were with on tour, also the unedited versions of "TERROR" as well as making of the video footage and possibly June Tenth footage."

==== Live lineup ====
When it came to the final lineup of the band, the first incarnation of My Ruin was:

- Melanie Makaiwi (guitar)
- Lance Webber (guitar)
- Meghan Mattox (bass)
- Marcelo Palomino (drums)
- Todd Osenbaugh (keyboards and samples)

Marcelo Palomino had been the drummer for Tura Satana. At the time, Tairrie stated: "When I first walked out of Tura Satana, Marcelo was one of the reasons I left, so it's funny he's with me again now. I asked him to do this project because I really respect him as a musician. He is my backbone, he is my strength and without him I simply don't think I could do it. He's the best friend I've got."

Palomino would become a recurring member of My Ruin and he joined the live band once again for their Tell Your God Tour in 2008 whilst promoting the band's fifth studio album, Throat Full of Heart. He would also feature on the artwork and recordings of the 2nd live album, titled Alive on the Other Side, that followed in late 2008. In 2011, Palomino collaborated with the band again and co-directed the band's video for the track Tennessee Elegy from the seventh studio album, A Southern Revelation.

=== A Prayer Under Pressure of Violent Anguish (2000–2002) ===
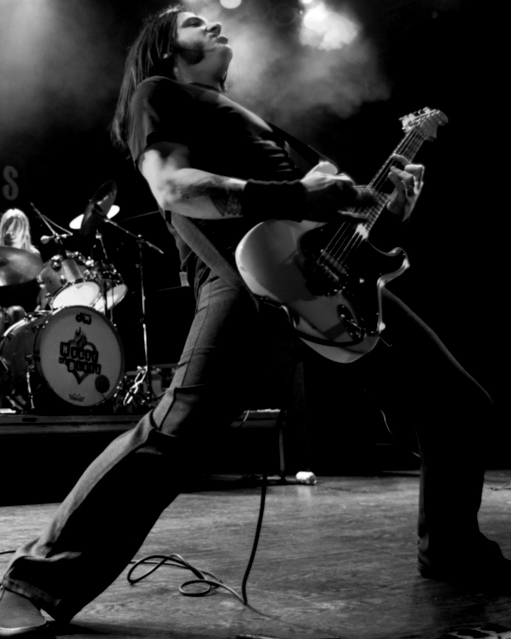
Mick Murphy performing

In 2000, the band would take on a new lineup, which saw the addition of former Movement vocalist/guitarist and longtime My Ruin guitarist/composer Mick Murphy. Mick would go on to be the band's longest serving member after Tairrie and became the sole songwriter. In an interview many years later, Tairrie said: "I released my first album under the name My Ruin and it was called "Speak and Destroy" on Snapper Music back in 1999. Soon after touring that album I actually met Mick Murphy, who is now my husband, my partner of ten years and my guitar player. He came in and we started dating and we got involved musically. It was the first time that's ever happened to me."

In a 2006 interview Mick said of meeting Tairrie: "I met Tairrie in February of 2000 at a party in Hollywood. We clicked right when we met and started hanging and got serious pretty fast. We also started writing "A Prayer Under Pressure of Violent Anguish," which was our first time working together musically, soon after that so it was a crazy, exciting, life changing kinda time."

Meghan Mattox would carry on playing bass and contributed to the songwriting process, but the rest of the band including Melanie Makaiwi would no longer be part of the My Ruin project. Regarding her departure in an interview, Tairrie stated that "Melanie had written a few songs with me. But we had to get a second guitarist in because she wasn't really a metal guitarist. She was really cool as she was the first woman I ever worked with. But when it came down to playing the heavier stuff live, it really wasn't her thing."

The "Prayer Under Pressure…" era saw My Ruin become a fully realized band and unit of contributing members, rather than being just Tairrie's solo project. During this time Tairrie stated: "This is the real deal. Not to sound like I'm dissing anyone but the truth is that I needed to break free of my past and although Marcelo is a good friend and awesome drummer his heart was not in it. Melanie was really cool but she did not understand the heavier side of things or "The Metal!" Lance and Toddy were basically just hired musicians for the tour."

Drumming duties on the album were undertaken by downset Drummer Chris Hamilton. 2000 also saw the addition of live drummer Yael, who would remain in the band until 2005. Yael went on to contribute to the band's The Shape of Things to Come... EP and The Horror of Beauty record.

In an interview with Kerrang!, Mick gave us a peek into the band's future which would take on a whole new sound through the years due to Mick's musicianship. He said: "I like the more old-school rock vibe...The fuzzy guitars, the big thick sounds, a lot of low-end power. Not that digital-sounding dance-metal."

The band underwent a winter 2000 concert tour of the UK in to promote A Prayer Under Pressure, supported by SugarComa. In an interview on the penultimate night of the tour, Tairrie explained her inspiration for the record's title: "The title comes from a couple of different prayer books I've been reading, in different parts. I kind of put it together, I read "A Prayer Under Pressure" in an old 1800s prayer book and then I read "Of Violent Anguish" somewhere else and I thought "That sounds kinda like my life and what we're doing" so I put them together and liked it."

A Prayer Under Pressure not only saw a change in lineup, but also a shift musically and a return to Tairrie's heavier roots. The record combined the harsher more abrasive elements of Speak and Destroy with Mick's trademark southern sounding guitar playing. Mick's style of playing would go on to play a major focal point in the years and records to come down the line. When comparing the heaviosity of A Prayer Under Pressure of Violent Anguish with Speak and Destroy, in an interview, Tairrie said: "Mick came in and had a lot of ideas that were really, really cool and a lot heavier."

In the same interview Mick commented: "I jumped into this band head first. I had a lot of musical ideas. I like to write, I like to write a lot. I like to be in control of what's going on musically, and we pushed her, encouraged her to do a heavy record."

He also went on to say that: "We did it because that's just the way I write music. One thing led to another, and before you know it we've got this brutally heavy album. I'm totally happy about that because I think metal needs to be raw, and not necessarily easy to listen to. I think that this record is truly heavy, so I'm proud of it."

The album was met with favorable reviews worldwide, with Kerrang! rating it 4 K's out of 5 and Metal Hammer rating it 8 out of 10.

A Prayer Under Pressure of Violent Anguish was released in September 2000. While the band were busy releasing A Prayer Under Pressure of Violent Anguish in the UK and Europe via Snapper Music, Speak and Destroy was simultaneously released in the US via Spitfire Records. A year later in 2001, A Prayer Under Pressure of Violent Anguish was released in the US via Spitfire Records.

==== Cover songs "Do You Love Me?" and "My War" ====
For this record, the band would cover two songs. The first being Nick Cave and the Bad Seeds Do You Love Me? and hidden track, My War originally by Black Flag (band). It has been well documented throughout Tairrie's career in interviews that she is a big fan of Nick Cave. Mick has also stated that Black Flag (band) is a big inspiration of his and that he previously covered the song My War in his prior band Movement. Tairrie liked the sound of it so they decided to cover the song, which became a duet between the two.

Mick and Tairrie would occasionally duet on a couple of songs through the vast My Ruin back catalog. Such duets include the 2005 cover of Mudhoney's Touch Me I'm Sick which featured on the band's The Brutal Language record and more recently Repose from the band's Ghosts and Good Stories record.

In the Kerrang! review for the album, both covers were praised: "A couple of starkly contrasting covers helps to keep My Ruin sounding fresh. A bleak reading of Nick Cave's Do You Love Me? is perfectly suited to Miss B's sultry drawl and loses none of its dark atmosphere in the translation. Black Flag's My War, on the other hand, is a breakneck blast that collapses into a dense wall of noise that Henry Rollins would be proud of."

==== "Beauty Fiend" single ====
In the year 2000, UK magazine Kerrang!, reviewed the band's hit single Beauty Fiend, taken from the A Prayer Under Pressure of Violent Anguish record, of which both received favorable reviews worldwide, with Kerrang! rating the single 3 Ks out of 5.

However, as is often the case, the review didn't come without its derogatory/backhanded comments regarding Tairrie's looks and body. The review opened with; "Despite being afforded far more attention this side of the Atlantic than a pretty face and a pair of tits warrants, Miss B is far from incapable of coming up with the goods every now and again."

The single became somewhat of an anthem among fans, challenging the oppressive, patriarchal and misogynist world of music and the media in general. The song would go on to be a My Ruin classic, fan favorite and set staple. In response to the review and speaking about the song in an interview with the same magazine, Tairrie stated: "This is exactly what Beauty Fiend is about! It's stating that I'm not gorgeous,, I'm not some f**cking beauty. It's nice to be called sexy and it's nice to be called pretty…It's always a compliment. Next week they'll call me f**cking ugly. That's nice too. But for the cover of the single, I've got all my make-up smeared and messed at the very end of a photoshoot. I know that I look like a hag, but it [the lyrics] kinda says it all: 'forgive me for not being pretty… Quit talking about my ass and my tits. Who gives a f**ck? I don't look at men like that. I don't look at Phil Anselmo and see a cock.'"

Despite such abuse, Tairrie has continued to break down barriers for women in rock and metal for over two decades. In a 2001 interview she stated: "My opinion is what it is... mine. Take it or leave it. Respect it or not. I will always have my own opinions and I am never be afraid to voice them. I don't want to revolutionize anything but myself. The more I learn, the more I change and the more I grow. I would rather be responsible for helping to open doors for women rather than closing them".

Furthermore, of the song Beauty Fiend, she stated: "Beauty Fiend is meant to be a real 'f**ck you' of a song...I'm not here to be your sex symbol, I'm not here to be your pretty girl on the cover. I'm here to be honest and to be beautiful on the inside while i'm ugly on the outside. What I'm giving you is pure. It's not f**cking fake or contrived. That's what real beauty is."

The single was released on CD and limited edition 7" vinyl, with 1,000 numbered copies being produced. The CD release was backed with the tracks Masochrist and the Black Flag cover of My War.

In 2004 the band announced that bassist Meghan Maddox had been asked to leave the band. No reason for Meghan being asked to leave was given at the time.

=== Ghosts and Good Stories (2010–2011) ===
During October 2009 in a press release, the band revealed that they had signed with the Tiefdruck-Musik record label.

The 6th studio album, titled Ghosts and Good Stories, was much neglected in terms of promotion and its hindered and botched release riddled with problems. These issues were due to their now ex record label, German based Tiefdruck-Musik.

Despite the issues surrounding the record behind the scenes the album went on to become the band's most critically acclaimed album to date. Reviews far and wide saw the band receive exposure in many European publications where the album was met with favorable reviews.

Kerrang! rated Ghosts and Good Stories 4 K's out of 5. Journalist Paul Travers wrote in his review: "As the singer and figurehead of Manhole and Tura Satana in the 90's, Tairrie B was among the first to channel screaming metallic rage through a female perspective... the vocalist gives vent to her inner demons, it's clear she's not mellowing with age... My Ruin create an abrasive, sludgy noise, punctuated by moments of melody and calm. It's stark, confrontational and aggressive, but also fiercely intelligent, ensuring the duo stay one step ahead of the screaming angst-ridden pack."

Metal Hammer UK and Italy came to the same conclusion regarding the album, with both grading it 8 out of 10. Dom Lawson of Metal Hammer UK wrote; "an exhilarating barrage of warped stoner metal riffs and blister-razing gutter-punk that lurches from harrowing, slow-motion menace (Diggin' For Ghosts) to floored-accelerator sludgecore (Long Dark Night); the whole scabrous din held together by its creators' unswerving passion. Easily the filthiest, heaviest and most exciting thing that Tairrie has put her scream to."

==== "Excommunicated" and "Long Dark Night" videos ====
On May 21, 2011 the band announced the video for the song Excommunicated. The video was filmed and edited by Tor Burrows of Notorious Design who had worked with the band previously on their other videos for their live Rick Derringer cover of Rock and Roll, Hoochie Koo and Me Without You from the band's Throat Full Of Heart album.

The Excommunicated video officially premiered via the band's website on May 22, 2011, to coincide with the 2011 end times prediction of Harold Camping.

Tor Burrows would later go on to direct and edit the video for Long Dark Night which premiered on the band's official site on August 8, 2011. The video contains live footage shot in the UK by Tor, mixed with footage shot in LA at the Whisky a Go Go shot by former My Ruin and Tura Satana drummer Marcelo Palomino as well as home footage shot of Tairrie herself. There are also various pieces of public domain stock footage and most strikingly of all, Hill of Crosses footage given to the band by film-maker Asatuurs Keim.

The Hill of Crosses is a Catholic pilgrimage site in northern Lithuania where, over many years Catholic pilgrims have left crosses and other religious paraphernalia. Tairrie stated she had always been intrigued by this religious site; "For some it is seen as a place of peace and power, for others a devotion and memorial. For me however, it is simply a scene of beauty whose landscape speaks to me on an otherworldly level when I view its images in photographs. It wasn't until Tor came across the footage shot by Asatuurs that this place began to speak to me subconsciously inviting me to have my own personal connection to it within this song, breathing a new scenery into my language." This revelation led to Tairrie reaching out to Asatuurs and writing him an email in which she asked if she could use the footage in the video for Long Dark Night, to this Asatuurs agreed. The footage goes hand in hand with the religious imagery with which the band have become notorious for using throughout their body work.

In keeping with the band's DIY ethic, Tairrie stated: "we had no budget to make this video. We are a DIY band and have always had to figure out a way to do it ourselves. With that in mind, we can say that it was a true labor of love made purely with passion, along with Premiere, After Effects and many long nights of editing and chatting on Skype from LA to the UK while cutting and pasting files, photos and footage into a shared folder in Dropbox and writing each other suggestions back and forth on Facebook. Welcome to the digital age! This video was made with no money but a million dollars worth of creativity and an artistic vision between two women who understand each other, the music one makes and the other one listens to."

==== Ghosts and Good Stories Tour ====
In May 2010 the band started releasing details of US, UK and German tour dates in order to promote the Ghosts and Good Stories album. But in early August 2010, the band issued a statement to press which revealed the cancellation of the tour dates.

Of the decision to cancel the dates at the time the band said; "As you know, My Ruin takes pride in being an independent and professional band with a strong DIY ethic and we realize [as we know you do] things like this happen all the time to bands both big and small but this is the first time in the 10-year history of our band that we have had to cancel a tour not to mention two very special shows in LA & London…Thank you all for your continued love and support. We are both sorry about this situation and hope you will understand that we did everything within our power to prevent this from happening."

The band went on to tour the album successfully after taking logistics into their own hands as they have done before without the help of a label. Late in August 2010, the band released information regarding the rescheduled dates for what would be the 10-date 2011 Ghosts and Good Stories Tour.

In December 2010, the band released information on the live rhythm section for the tour. The two new band members to join the band were announced as Luciano Ferrea of the LA based band Beggars Ball and familiar face Matt LeChevalier. Matt had previously recorded with the band on the Throat Full of Heart album in 2008. He also toured with the band during The Brutal Language Tour and Summer of Hell Tour in 2006.

==== Record label issues ====
A year after the release of Ghosts and Good Stories when unveiling details for 7th studio album, A Southern Revelation, the band spoke out about the issues surrounding the botched Ghosts and Good Stories release, Tiefdruck-Musik and the label boss himself. A statement issued by the band revealed that: "We had begun to confirm shows for a European tour and were looking forward to working with our new label when suddenly there was a strange and unexpected turn of events and Daniel Heerdmann changed from being our biggest supporter into our most vicious adversary overnight. We had no idea why or where this sudden shift in attitude had come from. We were now dealing with a completely different man and it was scary. We quickly began to discover many of his promises had been lies regarding money transfers, marketing, promotion and tour support. This led to our being forced for the first time in our career to cancel our tour as chaos and confusion set in. Our album release was delayed in every territory and our once friendly mutual respectful relationship was now done. To date My Ruin has never received any accounting from Tiefdruck Musik for album sales." These lies resulted in the album release being delayed many times and the cancellation of the Ghosts and Good stories Tour, which was to be rescheduled for the following year.

Turning a positive into a negative, the drama with Tiefdruck-Musik and owner Daniel Heerdmann would then go on to inspire the band's most critically lauded album A Southern Revelation.

== Side projects ==
The duo also pursue other projects which include The LVRS, a spoken word side project of "spoken word dirges set to music", Neanderthal, Mick's instrumental metal side project and Tairrie's Blasphemous Girl Designs.

=== The LVRS ===
This project involves both Tairrie and Mick. The LVRS project formed in 2003 when the couple self-released The Murder of Miss Hollywood via their official website. They then went on to self-release the 2nd album, The Secret Life of Lola Burns, in 2004, again through their own website. Due to the praise and success of the project from the fans, the duo decided to find an official home for the recordings. The first official CD release was titled; Death Has Become Her (2006) via record label Undergroove Records and was later re-released, digitally in 2009 via bandcamp.com. In a review for Death Has Become Her, Morley Seaver wrote; "The material is a mélange of autobiographical material courtesy of Tairrie B, and pieces of fiction inspired by several sources; the poet Virginia Woolf's suicide along with the Black Dahlia murder of 1947. Fittingly the material reflects the roots of the band's (as it were) name. The topics of Love, Violence, Religion and Sex figure prominently in these stories (look at the first letter in each of those words if you haven't caught on already) sometimes simultaneously." The 2nd official, digital only release is: Lady Speaks the Bruise (2010) also released via bandcamp.com. Both official releases were put together from the original recordings with the addition of new tracks.

On February 14, 2012, Valentine's Day, The LVRS announced via www.myruin.net that they would be making both Death Has Become Her and Lady Speaks the Bruise albums available as a free digital only download via www.bandcamp.com.

=== Neanderthal ===
Another side project is Mick Murphy's side project Neanderthal. This is a solo outing, often described by the man himself as instrumental-metal in which Mick writes, performs, records and produces all that is heard. The first album, Start a Fire with Rock, was released in 2006 as a 14-song CD and 2nd album, Take The Ride, was released in 2007. Both were also available as a USB wristband in the band's merchandise store. They have since been re-mastered and re-released online via bandcamp.com along with a number of other recordings.

=== Blasphemous Girl Designs ===
Blasphemous Girl Designs initially focused on My Ruin band merchandise and de-constructed clothing. The brand later went on to focus primarily on jewelry and wearable art. Blasphemous Girl Designs was founded in 2001 and an online store was opened in 2009. Tairrie hand makes everything herself again in keeping with her DIY ethic. In recent years the brands tagline has been; "Wearable art for the individual at heart". In an interview in September 2011, Tairrie expressed plans to grow her BGD brand: "When the time is right it might be nice to take it to the next level at some point and get a few of my ideas backed by a larger company."

== Band members ==
- Tairrie B Murphy – vocals
- Mick Murphy – guitar, bass, drums

== Discography ==
=== Studio albums ===
Title	Album details	Peak chart positions
Title	Album details	UK
Speak and Destroy	Released: August 23, 1999; Label: Snapper; Formats: CD, digital download	79
A Prayer Under Pressure of Violent Anguish	Released: September 18, 2000; Label: Snapper; Formats: CD, digital download	90
The Horror of Beauty	Released: October 20, 2003; Label: Century Media; Formats: CD, digital download	—
The Brutal Language	Released: November 7, 2005; Label: Rovena; Formats: CD, digital download	—
Throat Full of Heart	Released: January 18, 2008; Label: Rovena; Formats: CD, digital download	—
Ghosts and Good Stories	Released: September 20, 2010; Label: Tiefdruck; Formats: CD, digital download	—
A Southern Revelation	Released: December 7, 2011; Label: Self-released; Formats: digital download	—
The Sacred Mood	Released: June 11, 2013; Label: Self-released; Formats: digital download	—
"—" denotes a recording that did not chart or was not released in that territory.

=== Live albums ===
- To Britain with Love... and Bruises (2001)
- Alive on the Other Side (2008)

=== Compilation albums ===
- Blasphemous Girl (2002)
- Ruined & Recalled (2003)

=== Singles ===
- "Terror/June 10" (1999)
- "Tainted Love/Blasphemous Girl" (1999)
- "Beauty Fiend/Masochrist" (2000)

=== EPs ===
- The Shape of Things to Come... (2003)

=== Enhanced CDs and DVDs ===
- 13 Minute Film Noir EPK - The Horror of Beauty (2003)
- Tell Your God to Ready for Blood - Throat Full of Heart (2008)
- Tell Your God Tour - Alive on the Other Side (2008)
- Behind the Scenes Making of... - Ghosts and Good Stories (2008)
