= The Power of a Woman =

Studio album by Tairrie B
- Released: June 12, 1990
- Recorded: 1989
- Studios: Audio Achievements (Torrance, CA); Echo Sound (Los Feliz, CA)
- Genre: Hip hop
- Length: 49:44
- Labels: Ruthless; MCA
- Producers: Tairrie B (also exec.); Bilal Bashir; Greg Kuehn; QDIII; Schoolly D

Tairrie B chronology
The Power of a Woman (1990)	Vintage Curses (2015)

Singles from Power of a Woman
- 1. "Murder She Wrote" Released: April 20, 1990; 2. "Swingin' 'wit "T"" Released: September 28, 1990

The Power of a Woman is the debut solo studio album by American rapper Tairrie B. It was released on June 12, 1990, via Comptown/Ruthless/MCA Records. The recording sessions took place at Audio Achievements, in Torrance, and Echo Sound, in Los Feliz. The album was produced by Quincy Jones III, Bilal Bashir, Greg Kuehn, Schoolly D, and Tairrie B, who also served as executive producer. It features guest appearances from Eazy-E and Everlast.

Two singles, "Murder She Wrote" & "Swingin' wit' T", peaked at numbers 27 and 28, respectively, on the US Hot Rap Singles chart.

== Critical reception ==
Professional ratings
Review scores
Source	Rating
AllMusic	3/5 stars
Los Angeles Times	2.5/4 stars

The St. Petersburg Times concluded that "The Power of a Woman is a feminist discourse for the '90s, a dissertation that is cerebral but not musty, gutter-wise but sophisticated, sexually up front and somewhat obscene."

== Track listing ==
No.	Title	Writer(s)	Producer(s)	Length
1.	"Intro"			0:32
2.	"Swingin' wit' T"	Theresa Beth; Maurice White; Philip Bailey; Larry Dunn	QD3; Tairrie B	4:13
3.	"Anything You Want" (featuring Eazy-E)	Beth; Jesse B. Weaver, Jr.; Sylvester Stewart	Schoolly D	3:58
4.	"Vinnie tha' Moocha" (featuring Everlast)	Cab Calloway; Irving Mills; Clarence Gaskill	Greg Kuehn; Tairrie B	4:01
5.	"Step 2 This"	Beth; Bilal Bashir	Bilal Bashir; Tairrie B	6:09
6.	"Murder She Wrote"	Beth; Quincy Jones III	QD3; Tairrie B	3:16
7.	"Packin' a Punch"	Beth; Art Neville; Joseph Modeliste; Leo Nocentelli; George Porter, Jr.	Bilal Bashir; Tairrie B	5:28
8.	"Let the Beat Rock"	Jones III	QD3	3:31
9.	"Player"	Beth; Gregory Russell Kuehn	Greg Kuehn; Tairrie B	5:25
10.	"Schooll's In"	Beth; Weaver, Jr.; Joe Tex; Charles Bobbit; Fred Wesley; James Brown	Schoolly D	4:50
11.	"Ruthless Bitch"	Beth	Tairrie B	8:21
Total length:				49:44

Notes

- Track 3 contains a sample from "Sing a Simple Song"
- Track 4 is a variation of "Minnie the Moocher"
- Track 10 contains sample from "Givin' up Food for Funk"

== Personnel ==
- Theresa "Tairrie B" Beth – vocals, producer (tracks: 2, 4–7, 9, 11), mixing (tracks: 2–5, 7), executive producer, design, stylist
- Eric "Eazy-E" Wright – rap vocals (track 3)
- Erik "Everlast" Schrody – rap vocals (track 4)
- Quincy Jones III – producer (tracks: 2, 6, 8), mixing (track 2)
- Jesse "Schoolly D" Weaver, Jr. – producer (tracks: 3, 10)
- Greg Kuehn – producer (tracks: 4, 9)
- Bilal Bashir – producer (tracks: 5, 7), mixing (tracks: 4, 5, 7)
- Donovan "The Dirt Biker" Smith – recording (tracks: 2, 8, 9), mastering
- Bob Morse – recording (tracks: 3–7, 10), mixing (tracks: 4, 5, 7)
- Brian "Big Bass" Gardner – mastering
- Jeff Adamoff – art direction
- Peter Dokus – photography
- Missy Garland – make-up
- George Green – hair
