= Speak and Destroy (album) =

Studio album by My Ruin
- Released: 23 August 1999
- Genre: Nu metal
- Length: 60:00
- Labels: Snapper; Spitfire
- Producers: Paul Naylor, Tairrie B

My Ruin chronology
Speak and Destroy (1999)	A Prayer Under Pressure of Violent Anguish (2000)

Professional ratings
Review scores
Source	Rating
AllMusic	2.5/5 stars
Collector's Guide to Heavy Metal	3/10
Metal Hammer	5/10
NME	7/10

Speak and Destroy is the debut studio album released by the metal band My Ruin. It contains a cover of Soft Cell's "Tainted Love". It also contains the singles "Blasphemous Girl" and "Terror". It was the first album lead singer Tairrie B made since her metal band Tura Satana .

== Track listing ==
UK release

1. "Prologue" - 0:06
2. "Terror" - 5:25
3. "Preacher" - 3:33
4. "Tainted Love" - 3:45
5. "Blasphemous Girl" - 3:43
6. "Close Your Eyes" - 5:30
7. "Absolution" - 3:27
8. "Horrible Pain (Within My Heart)" - 4:07
9. "Monster" - 3:41
10. "Sick with It" - 3:41
11. "My Beautiful Flower" - 4:17
12. "Diavolina" - 4:45
13. "June 10" - 4:38
14. "Bright Red Scream" - 4:01
15. "Cosmetic" - 4:05
16. "Sycophant" - 3:59
17. "Epilogue" - 0:43
18. "Beware of God" - 0:28

US release

1. "Prologue"
2. "Terror"
3. "Preacher" (Live)
4. "Tainted Love" (Remix)
5. "Blasphemous Girl"
6. "Close Your Eyes"
7. "Absolution"
8. "Horrible Pain (Within My Heart)"
9. "Fever"
10. "Sick with It"
11. "My Beautiful Flower"
12. "Diavolina"
13. "June 10"
14. "Masochrist"
15. "Cosmetic"
16. "Sycophant"
17. "Epilogue"
18. "Beware of God"
