= A Southern Revelation =

Studio album by My Ruin
- Released: 7 December 2011
- Genre: Alternative metal, nu metal
- Producer: Mick Murphy & Joel Stooksbury

My Ruin chronology
Ghosts and Good Stories (2010)	A Southern Revelation (2011)

A Southern Revelation is the seventh studio album by the Los Angeles–based metal band My Ruin, released as a free download from their bandcamp page. Sound Sphere reviewed the album as "most impressive and emotional offering yet".

== Track listing ==
1. "Tennessee Elegy" – 3:35
2. "Highly Explosive" – 3:56
3. "Walk of Shame" – 4:20
4. "Deconsecrated" – 4:04
5. "Middle Finger" – 4:20
6. "Vultures" – 4:09
7. "Seventh Sacrament" – 3:11
8. "Reckoning" – 4:19
9. "The Soulless Beast" – 4:07
10. "Mean Street" (Van Halen cover) – 4:53
