= The Brutal Language =

Studio album by My Ruin
- Released: 7 November 2005
- Length: 36:20
- Label: Rovena Recordings; Undergroove
- Producer: Mick Murphy

My Ruin chronology
| The Horror of Beauty (2003) | The Brutal Language (2005) | Throat Full of Heart (2008) |

Professional ratings
Review scores
| Source | Rating |
|---|---|
| AllMusic | 3/5 stars |
| drownedinsound.com | link |

The Brutal Language is the fourth full-length album released by the metal band My Ruin. Metal Express Radio described the lyrics as evil but with a humorous side.

== Track listing ==
1. "Nature Boy" - 1:13
2. "Silverlake 6571" - 4:38
3. "The Devil Walks" - 3:44
4. "Spilling Open" - 3:48
5. "Cold Hands Warm Heart" - 3:53
6. "Metamorphosis - 4:42
7. "Summer of Hell" - 4:11
8. "Vince Vaughn" - 3:02
9. "Imitation of Christ" - 4:05
10. "Touch Me I'm Sick" (Mudhoney cover) - 2:56

== Personnel ==
- Tairrie B - vocals
- Mick Murphy - guitars, bass guitar, drums, keyboards on "Nature Boy", backing vocals on "Touch Me I'm Sick", producer
- Nick Raskulinecz - mixer, mastering
