= James Bloor (cricketer) =

English cricketer

Personal information
- Full name: James Henry Bloor
- Born: 29 September 1857; Clifton, Bristol, England
- Died: 9 March 1935 (aged 77); Brynmawr, Brecknockshire, Wales
- Batting: Right-handed
- Bowling: Right-arm medium

Domestic team information
- Years: Team
- 1887: Gloucestershire

Career statistics
Competition	First-class
Matches	3
Runs scored	44
Batting average	8.80
100s/50s	0/0
Top score	22
Balls bowled	64
Wickets	0
Bowling average	–
5 wickets in innings	–
10 wickets in match	–
Best bowling	–
Catches/stumpings	2/–
- Source: Cricinfo, 5 August 2012

James Henry Bloor (29 September 1857 – 9 March 1935) was an English cricketer. Bloor was a right-handed batsman who bowled right-arm medium pace. He was born at Clifton, Bristol.

Bloor made his first-class debut for Gloucestershire against Kent in 1887 at Rectory Field, Blackheath. He made two further first-class appearances for the county in 1887, against Sussex at the County Ground, Hove, and Middlesex at Lord's. In his three matches, he scored a total of 44 runs at an average of 8.80, with a high score of 22.

He died at Brynmawr, Brecknockshire, on 9 March 1935.
