= Strelnikoff Mary of Help of Brezje controversy =

Bitchcraft cover

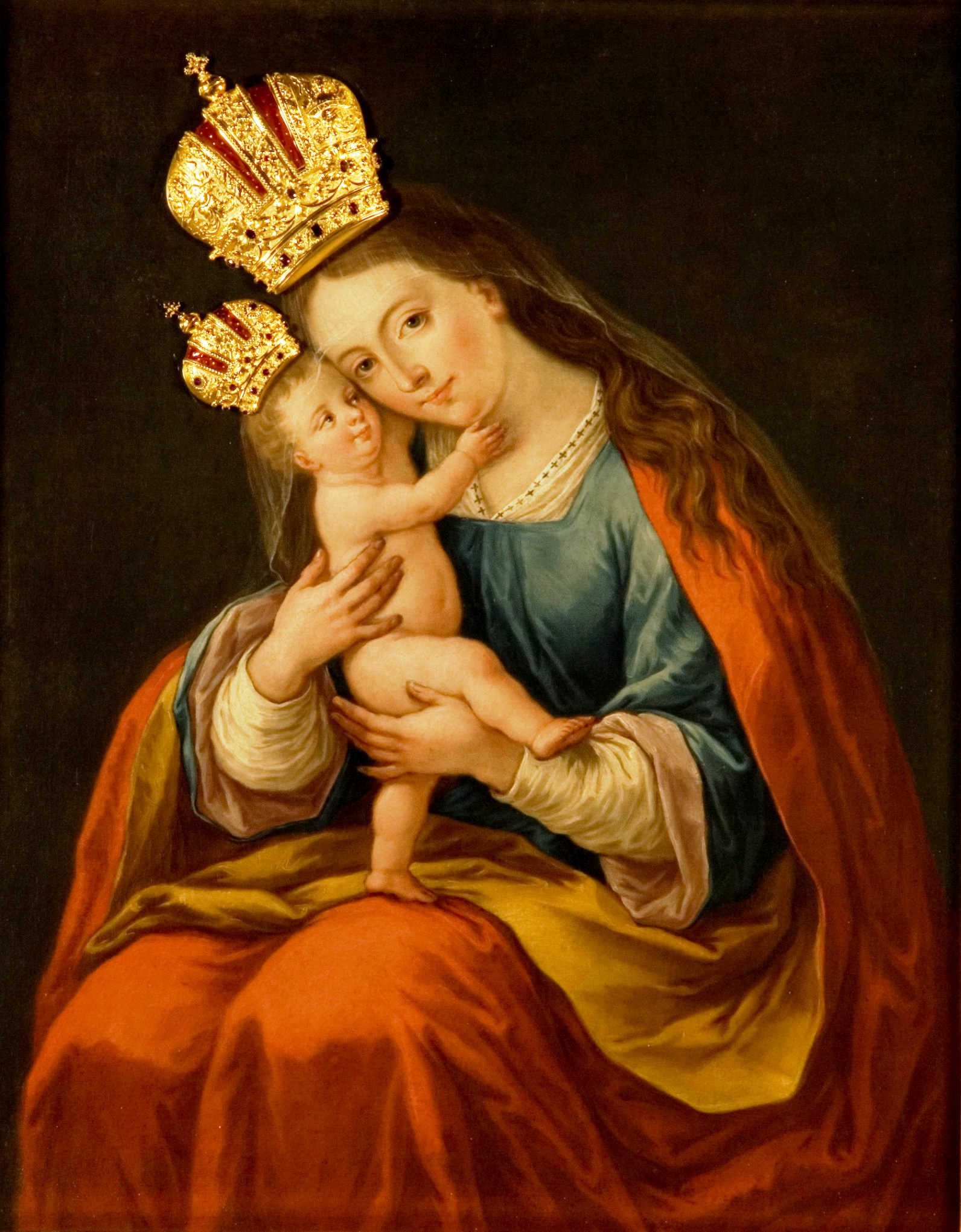
Mary of Help of Brezje

The Strelnikoff Mary of Help of Brezje controversy or the Strelnikoff Affair (Slovene: Afera Strelnikoff) began after a depiction of Mary of Help of Brezje holding a rat instead of Jesus was published by the Slovenian music group Strelnikoff on the cover of their 1998 extended play Bitchcraft. It was made in protest of the official views of the Roman Catholic Church in Slovenia and the statements of some of its highest representatives on the subject of abortion.

The first to condemn this depiction was Franc Rode, who was the Bishop of Ljubljana at the time. This was followed by general public outcry and expressions of the inappropriateness of the misuse of one of the most known symbols of Slovenian Catholicism. The State Attorney's Office received 3,867 public protests and 1,208 requests for indictment. These were united in one that was at first rebuffed before the Celje District Court. However, the state prosecutor Elizabeta Gyorkos filled a complaint. The group members also received phone calls and threats. In August 2003, the indictment was refused by the Ljubljana Higher Court as well. In accordance with the Constitution of Slovenia and the Slovenian law, the court concluded that the authors were "tasteless in their artistic project, however they did not surpass the boundary of allowed at all."
