= Escanaba Firing Line =

American rock band

- Left to right: Ryan Younce, Chris Davies, Jesse Younce, Chad Sturdivant

Background information
- Origin: Traverse City, Michigan, United States
- Genres: Progressive rock Experimental rock Alternative rock Post-hardcore
- Years active: 2002–present
- Members: Jesse Younce; Ryan Younce; Chad Sturdivant; Chris Davies
- Past members: Tony Colombo; Jeremy VanSice

Escanaba Firing Line is an American rock band formed in Traverse City, Michigan in 2002, by brothers Jesse and Ryan Younce. Shortly after the band's conception, they were joined by bassist Chris Davies and drummer Chad Sturdivant.

They take their name after the city of Escanaba, located in Michigan's Upper Peninsula. They have cited the genres of progressive rock, punk rock, jazz fusion, and Nuevo tango as major influences, as well as Middle Eastern, Celtic, and African musical styles.

The band has been on hiatus since 2012.

== History and critical reception ==
Following their formation in 2002, Escanaba Firing Line gained attention in regional print press. Their 2004 release was noted by Northern Express for filling a void in the Northern Michigan alternative music scene. In November of that year, Thirdeye Magazine profiled the group, acknowledging their distinctive approach to progressive and experimental rock.

The band's legacy within the regional DIY music community was later noted in a retrospective by Interlochen Public Radio, which highlighted their early performances at the American Legion Hall and impact on local youth subculture. Additionally, the band's history was detailed in the Lansing City Pulse during a feature covering the musical career of guitarist Ryan Younce.

== Members ==
=== Current members ===
- Ryan Younce – vocals, guitar
- Jesse Younce – vocals, guitar
- Chad Sturdivant – drums
- Chris Davies – bass guitar

=== Previous members ===
- Tony Colombo – bass (2002–2007)
- Mike Fuksman – drums (2004–2007)
- Jeremy VanSice – drums (2002–2004)

== Discography ==
=== Albums ===
- Big Disco (2006)

=== EPs ===
- Speak and Destroy (2003)

=== Live albums and compilations ===
- Live at Jacob's Well Traverse City, MI 2003 (2003)
- Live at Saint Andrew's Hall Detroit, MI 2003 (2003)
- Live at Short's 2005 (2006)
- Live at the Belmont 2010 (2010)
