= Speak and Destroy (EP) =

EP by Escanaba Firing Line
- Released: June 24, 2003
- Recorded: 2002
- Studio: Woodshed Studios, Oak Park, Michigan
- Genre: Progressive rock; indie rock
- Length: 46:24
- Label: ThinkTank Records
- Producer: Escanaba Firing Line

Escanaba Firing Line chronology
Speak and Destroy (2003)	Live At Short's (2006)

Speak and Destroy is an extended-play by the American rock band Escanaba Firing Line, released on June 24, 2003. Originally recorded for demo purposes only the recording was never meant to be released to the public and was only released in low quantities.

== Track listing ==
All songs written and performed by Escanaba Firing Line.

1. "Broken Beat" – 4:12
2. "Terra Incognito" – 4:02
3. "Awkward Child" – 2:32
4. "Moderate Rock Tempo" – 2:29
5. "pinot noir" – 5:11
6. "Instrumental" – 4:50
7. "a little island" – 5:02
8. "Talking to a Wall" – 3:23
9. "Dakota" – 4:07
10. "False Start" (live) – 11:56

== Personnel ==
Escanaba Firing Line

- Ryan Younce – guitar, vocals
- Jesse Younce – guitar, vocals, art and design
- Tony Colombo – bass, additional vocals
- Jeremy VanSice – drums, additional percussion and vocals

Additional musicians

- S. Miller – guest vocals

Production

- Tim Pak – engineering, mixing
- The Flying Pauleini Brothers – mixing
