= Relief Through Release =

Studio album by Tura Satana
- Released: September 29, 1997
- Studio: Titan Recording Studios (Sherman Oaks, California)
- Genre: Nu metal
- Length: 57:50
- Label: Noise
- Producer: Michael Vail Blum; Tura Satana

Tura Satana chronology
All Is Not Well (1996)	Relief Through Release (1997)

Alternative cover

Relief Through Release is the second and final studio album by the American band Tura Satana. It was the band's only release under their current name after changing their name from Manhole. It was released in Europe on September 29, 1997, and in the United States in April 1998.

== Composition ==
According to AllMusic, Relief Through Release "is a solid testament to the capability of the nu-metal genre", with Tairrie B's performance being compared to "a mixture of Courtney Love and Marilyn Manson". The band's music was categorized as a "relentless assault on one's ears, musically sounding as raw and heavy as early Coal Chamber".

== Reception ==
Professional ratings
Review scores
Source	Rating
AllMusic	3/5 stars
Chronicles of Chaos	10/10
Collector's Guide to Heavy Metal	4/10
The Encyclopedia of Popular Music	3/5 stars
The Great Metal Discography	7/10
Kerrang!	4/5 stars
Metal Hammer	6/10
Rock Hard	8/10
Vox	1/5 stars

Like its predecessor, Relief Through Release received mixed-to-positive reviews from critics. AllMusic called the album "a solid chunk of nu-metal sludge that goes a long way in proving that female-fronted groups can be just as unforgiving and brutal in this predominantly male genre."

== Track listing ==
All songs written by Tairrie B and Scott Ueda, except where noted.

1. "Welcome To Violence" — 0:09
2. "Luna" — 3:58
3. "Dry" (Ueda) — 3:53
4. "Venus Diablo" — 3:22
5. "Unclean" — 4:47
6. "Flux" — 3:46
7. "Eternalux" — 4:26
8. "Storage" — 3:50
9. "Scavenger Hunt" — 3:27
10. "Negative Creep" (Kurt Cobain) — 2:58
  - Nirvana cover featuring John Davis of Slick Fifty
11. "Relapse" — 3:55
12. "Last Rites" — 3:56
13. "Omnia Vinat Amor" — 15:05

== Personnel ==
- Tairrie B - Vocals
- Scott Mitsuo - Guitar
- Rico Villasenor - Bass
- Marcelo Palomino - Drums
- John Davis - Guest Vocals on Negative Creep
- Michael Vail Blum - Producer, Engineer, Mixer

== Charts ==
Chart (1997)	Peak position
UK Albums (OCC)	167
UK Independent Albums (OCC)	33
UK Rock & Metal Albums (OCC)	7
