= A Prayer Under Pressure of Violent Anguish =

Studio album by My Ruin
- Released: 18 September 2000
- Genres: Alternative metal, nu metal
- Length: 46:20
- Labels: Snapper, Spitfire
- Producers: Nick Raskulinecz, Mick Murphy, Tairrie B

My Ruin chronology
Speak and Destroy (1999)	A Prayer Under Pressure of Violent Anguish (2000)	To Britain with Love... and Bruises (2001)

Professional ratings
Review scores
Source	Rating
Allmusic	4/5 stars
Kerrang!	4/5 stars
Metal Hammer	8/10
NME	4/5 stars
Terrorizer	6.5/10

A Prayer Under Pressure of Violent Anguish is the second full-length album released by the metal band My Ruin. My Ruin covered two songs for this album, "Do You Love Me?" by Nick Cave and the Bad Seeds, and Black Flag's "My War". The song "Miss Ann Thrope" contains backup vocals from Jack Off Jill singer Jessicka. The album contains the single "Beauty Fiend".

== Track listing ==
1. "Morning Prayer" - 0:33
2. "Beauty Fiend" - 3:41
3. "Stick It to Me" - 3:02
4. "Heartsick" - 3:01
5. "Rockstar" - 3:37
6. "Sanctuary" - 3:19
7. "Miss Ann Thrope" (feat. Jessicka of Jack Off Jill) - 3:22
8. "Hemorrhage" - 4:15
9. "Letter to the Editor" - 3:22
10. "Let It Rain" - 3:30
11. "Post Noise Revelation" - 3:46
12. "Do You Love Me" (Nick Cave and the Bad Seeds cover) - 4:19
13. "Evening Prayer" - 4:01
14. "My War" (Black Flag cover) - 2:02

== Personnel ==
- Tairrie B – vocals, producer
- Mick Murphy – guitars, producer
- Meghan Mattex – bass guitar
- Chris Hamilton – drums
- Jessicka – guest vocals on "Miss Ann Thrope"
- Nick Raskulinecz – producer, sound engineer, mixer
