= Matthew Ogens =

American film director

- Born: United States
- Occupations: Film director, photographer, artist

Matthew Ogens is an American film director, creative director, photographer and artist, best known for his 2021 Netflix documentary short film, Audible, which was nominated for Best Documentary Short Subject at the 94th Academy Awards.

He directed and produced the feature documentary Confessions of a Superhero, which premiered at SXSW. Ogens also earned three Emmy Award nominations for work he directed for two original series on ESPN (The Life and Timeless). In addition, he directed a short film titled From Harlem with Love about the Harlem Globetrotters as part of the Emmy Award-winning series 30 for 30.

Ogens has directed numerous television projects including segments for the CNN Heroes Awards Show hosted by Anderson Cooper, Stand Up 2 Cancer, ESPN, MTV, VH1, and more.

His second feature documentary, Meet the Hitlers, was executive produced by Morgan Spurlock and premiered on Showtime in 2016.

In 2018, Ogens directed the narrative feature film Go North.
