= Sophie Kennedy Clark =

Scottish actress (born 1990)

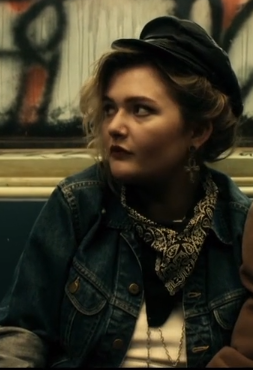
- Clark in Urban Myths: Madonna and Basquiat 2019
- Born: 1990 (age 35–36); Aberdeen, Scotland
- Occupation: Actress
- Relatives: Fiona Kennedy (mother); Calum Kennedy (maternal grandfather)

Sophie Kennedy Clark (born 1990) is a Scottish actress. She is the daughter of actress and singer Fiona Kennedy and the granddaughter of singer Calum Kennedy.

== Career ==
Her first big break came when she starred as David Tennant's eldest daughter in the television series Single Father. She next went on to do theatre in London's Southwark Playhouse in Eight Women and had appeared in a handful of projects including Lauren in the episode of Black Mirror entitled "The National Anthem". In 2012, she made a short appearance in Dark Shadows, with Johnny Depp. She also appeared in Stephen Frears' film Philomena (2013) and in Lars von Trier's film Nymphomaniac (2014).

In 2021, she acted and produced Sorority with director James Webber. She later won the Unrestricted View Film Festival award for Best Actress in a Feature.

She also plays the clarsach.

== Filmography ==
=== Films ===
- Dark Shadows (2012), Hippie Chick 1
- Philomena (2013), Young Philomena
- Nymphomaniac (2014), B
- Stonehearst Asylum (2014), Millie
- The Danish Girl (2015), Ursula
- Tomorrow (2016), Lee-Anne
- Go North (2017)
- Obey (2018), Twiggy
- Sorority (2021), Harriet
- Venice at Dawn (2022)

=== Television ===
- Single Father as Tanya (2010)
- Black Mirror as Lauren (2011)
- The Marriage of Reason & Squalor as Lydia (2015)
- The Cry as Kirsty (2018)
- Urban Myths: Madonna and Basquiat as Madonna (2019)
- The Phoebus Files as Marjorie (2023)
