= Go North (film) =

- Film poster
- Directed by: Matt Ogens
- Written by: Kyle Lierman; Matt Ogens
- Produced by: Josh Gold; Jay Thames
- Starring: Jacob Lofland; Sophie Kennedy Clark; Patrick Schwarzenegger; James Bloor
- Cinematography: John Tipton
- Edited by: Hal Honigsberg; Chris Chan Lee
- Music by: Greg Kuehn
- Production companies: Mother + Father; 77 Films
- Distributed by: Gunpowder & Sky; Orion Pictures
- Release date: January 13, 2017 (US)
- Running time: 105 minutes
- Country: United States
- Language: English

Go North is a coming-of-age thriller film directed by Matt Ogens and co-written by Kyle Lierman and Ogens. The film stars Jacob Lofland, Sophie Kennedy Clark, Patrick Schwarzenegger, and James Bloor.

== Cast ==
- Jacob Lofland as Josh
- Sophie Kennedy Clark as Jessie
- Patrick Schwarzenegger as Caleb
- James Bloor as Gentry
- Atif Hashwi as Ryan
- Derek Brandon as Connor
- Josh Close as Martin
- Jostein Sagnes as Jas

== Production ==
Josh Gold and Jay Thames produced the film. Greg Kuehn wrote the music. Matt Ogens and Kyle Lierman co-wrote the script and Ogens directed the film. Music Supervision by Donny Dykowsky. The cast included Jacob Lofland, Sophie Kennedy Clark, Patrick Schwarzenegger, and Atif Hashwi. James Bloor also joined the film later. Jostein Sagnes joined the cast in the feature film and starred in the promotional VR experience.

Principal photography on the film began on July 21, 2015, in Detroit, Michigan.

== Release ==
Gunpowder & Sky distributed the film through a limited release in US cinemas and video on demand on January 13, 2017.
