= Tura Satana (band) =

American metal band

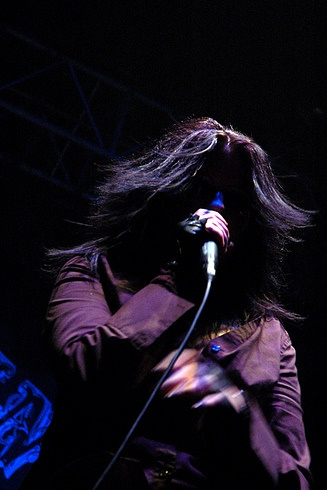
- Former Tura Satana vocalist Tairrie B.

Background information
- Also known as: Manhole (1994–1997)
- Origin: Los Angeles, California, U.S.
- Genres: Alternative metal; nu metal; rap metal; rap rock
- Years active: 1994–1998; 2002
- Label: Noise
- Past members: Tairrie B; Brian Harrah; Rico Villasenor; Marcelo Palomino; Scott Ueda; Marty Ramirez; Stephen Klein; Louiche Mayorga; Tommy Loya

Tura Satana was an American rock band formed by rapper and singer Tairrie B after she departed from her contract with the rap label Ruthless Records. Initially formed as a rap rock band under the name Manhole, the band changed their name due to a conflict with a Texas band of the same name, and shifted to a nu metal sound.

== Biography ==
While recording her second rap album for Ruthless Records, rapper and singer Tairrie B wanted to form a rap rock band, and recorded a rap version of Van Halen's "Runnin' with the Devil", entitled "Rhyming with a Devil", but no one at the label liked these ideas, and discouraged her from pursuing them. After seeing Ice-T performing with his band Body Count, Tairrie B became more motivated to pursue the formation of her own band, and shelved her second rap album and left the label so that she could form a group where she could "rap over heavy music and address more socially conscious issues". The band was formed under the name Manhole, and in 1994, Lethal Records released two songs by Manhole on a seven-inch vinyl record, and were subsequently asked by Noise Records to be a part of their 1995 compilation The Fall and the Rise of Los Angeles, which led to the band signing a recording contract with the label due to positive response to the band. After signing, however, the band learned that there was already a Texas punk rock band named Manhole which had formed before them, but Noise Records assured Tairrie B's band that they would remedy the situation, and the Los Angeles Manhole began looking for a producer to record their debut album.

Korn introduced Manhole to Ross Robinson, who Manhole hired to produce their debut album, All Is Not Well. The album's lyrics dealt with subject matter such as rape, violence against women, abortion and racism. Despite liking Robinson, the band were ultimately dissatisfied with his production on the album, with Tairrie B later saying that the band felt that had they worked with another producer who did not rush the album's production as they felt Robinson had, they could have made a stronger album.

Despite previously assuring Tairrie B's band that they would straighten out the legal issues involving the Texas band Manhole, Noise was unable to resolve the legal issues, forcing the Los Angeles band to change their name. Losing the Manhole name turned the musical output of the band in a different direction, as Tarrie B stated that it had changed her as a woman and as a writer.

Eventually, Tairrie B chose the name Tura Satana, after the actress of the same name, due to Tairrie B finding the actress's character Varla in the film Faster, Pussycat! Kill! Kill! "empowering". With the change in name, the band also shifted their musical style, moving away from their previous rap rock sound to one that was more "internal and emotional". Under the name Tura Satana, the band released the album Relief Through Release, which a retrospective review by AllMusic described as being "a solid testament to the capability of the nu-metal genre". Due to distribution problems with the label and internal struggles, the band broke up in 1998.

On January 18, 2002, Tura Santana's final lineup reunited for a performance at the Troubador in Hollywood. In January 2020, Tairrie B released All is Not Well and Relief Through Release for free on her Bandcamp page, alongside a compilation of nine demo recordings from the band's early years. In July 2020, she also released a live recording of Manhole performing in Paris on December 15, 1996.

== Band members ==
Final lineup

- Tairrie B - Vocals (1994–1998, 2002)
- Brian Harrah - Guitar (1997–1998, 2002)
- Rico Villasenor - Bass (1996–1998, 2002)
- Marcelo Palomino - Drums (1994–1998, 2002)

Former members

- Scott Ueda - Guitar (1994–1997)
- Marty Ramirez - Guitar (1994)
- Stephen Klein - Bass (1994–1995)
- Louiche Mayorga - Bass (1996)
- Tommy Loya - touring bassist (1997)

== Discography ==
=== Studio albums ===
List of studio albums, with selected chart positions
Title	Album details	Peak chart positions		
Title	Album details	UK	UK Ind.	UK Rock
All Is Not Well	Released: April 16, 1996; Reissue: February 1998; Label: Noise Records	—	—	32
Relief Through Release	Released: September 29, 1997 (UK); Label: Noise	167	33	7
"—" denotes a recording that did not chart or was not released in that territory.

=== Compilation albums ===
- The Early Years (2020)

=== Live albums ===
- Live in Paris (2020)

=== Singles ===
- "Victim" (1996)
- "Kiss or Kill" (1996)
- "Scavenger Hunt" / "Piece of My Heart" (1997)
- "Venus Diablo" (1998)
