= Clutch discography =

American rock band discography

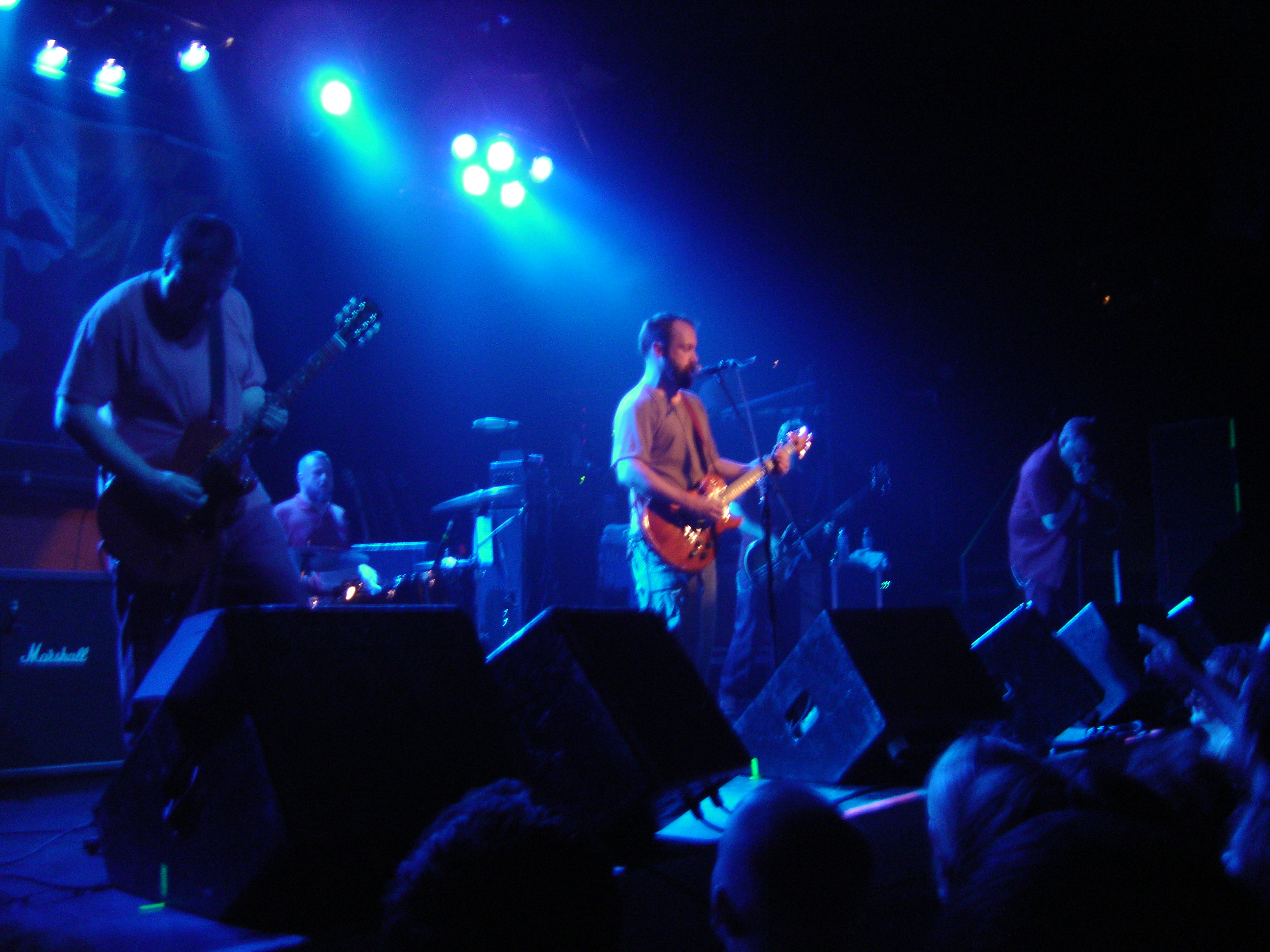
- Clutch performing in 2007
- Studio albums: 14
- Extended plays: 5
- Live albums: 6
- Compilation albums: 3
- Singles: 20
- Video albums: 2
- Music videos: 19
- Other appearances: 4

The discography of Clutch, an American rock band, consists of fourteen studio albums, five live albums, three compilation albums, five extended plays, twenty singles, nineteen music videos, and two video albums.

Clutch was formed in 1991 by vocalist Neil Fallon, guitarist Tim Sult, bassist Dan Maines and drummer Jean-Paul Gaster. The group debuted with Pitchfork, an EP released in October that same year. The band built a local following through constant gigging and released their second EP Passive Restraints through Earache). Clutch was signed by the East West Records label and released their full-length debut Transnational Speedway League. A self-titled album appeared two years later, which afforded the band some mainstream exposure.

Clutch then signed with major label Columbia for 1998's The Elephant Riders, but released 1999's Jam Room on their own River Road Records label.

In 2001 the band signed with Atlantic for the release of Pure Rock Fury, which included guest appearances from members of Spirit Caravan and Sixty Watt Shaman.

Their sixth album, Blast Tyrant, appeared three years later and was the first through DRT Entertainment, followed by Robot Hive/Exodus in 2005, which featured the first lineup change since the early 1990s; the addition of organist Mick Schauer. 2007 saw the release of From Beale Street to Oblivion, and in the next year their first video, entitled Full Fathom Five: Video Field Recordings, which was accompanied by a CD version Full Fathom Five: Audio Field Recordings.

In 2009, Clutch released Strange Cousins from the West on their own label, Weathermaker Music. The band was once again a four-piece, without Schauer in the line-up.

In 2013, they released their tenth studio album Earth Rocker again through Weathermaker, their highest charting record in the US at the time. It peaked at number 15 on the Billboard 200 chart.

In 2015, they released Psychic Warfare on Weathermaker, peaking at number 11 on the Billboard 200. That same year, they also released a compilation album, La Curandera, exclusively on pink vinyl, as part of the Ten Bands, One Cause campaign for breast cancer awareness.

In 2018, the band released Book of Bad Decisions on Weathermaker, their twelfth studio album.

In 2022, Clutch released Sunrise on Slaughter Beach on Weathermaker, their thirteenth studio album.

The band's fourteenth album, Wasted Lands, will be released on Weathermaker on January 22, 2027.

== Albums ==
=== Studio albums ===
Year	Album details	Peak chart positions					Sales
Year	Album details	US	US Heat.	US Ind.	NOR	UK	Sales
1993	Transnational Speedway League: Anthems, Anecdotes and Undeniable Truths: Released: June 17, 1993; Label: East West; Formats: CD, CS, LP	—	—	—	—	—	US: 114,847+
1995	Clutch: Released: May 9, 1995; Label: East West; Formats: CD, CS, LP	—	33	—	—	—	US: 138,730+
1998	The Elephant Riders: Released: April 14, 1998; Label: Columbia; Formats: CD, CS	104	1	—	—	—	US: 88,377+
1999	Jam Room: Released: October 1, 1999; Label: River Road Records; Formats: CD	—	—	—	—	—	
2001	Pure Rock Fury: Released: March 13, 2001; Label: Atlantic; Formats: CD	135	3	—	—	—	US: 100,000
2004	Blast Tyrant: Released: March 23, 2004; Label: DRT; Formats: CD	147	4	4	—	—	US: 59,963+
2005	Robot Hive/Exodus: Released: June 21, 2005; Label: DRT; Formats: CD	94	—	7	—	—	
2007	From Beale Street to Oblivion: Released: March 27, 2007; Label: DRT; Formats: CD	52	—	4	39	112	
2009	Strange Cousins from the West: Released: July 14, 2009; Label: Weathermaker; Formats: LP, CD	38	—	5	—	95	
2013	Earth Rocker: Released: March 15, 2013; Label: Weathermaker; Formats: LP, CD	15	—	3	13	50	US: 80,000
2015	Psychic Warfare: Released: October 2, 2015; Label: Weathermaker; Formats: LP, CD	11	—	2	—	20	
2018	Book of Bad Decisions: Released: September 7, 2018; Label: Weathermaker; Formats: LP, CD	16	—	2	—	13	
2022	Sunrise on Slaughter Beach: Released: September 16, 2022; Label: Weathermaker; Formats: LP, CD, digital	89	—	12	—	—	
2027	Wasted Lands: Released: January 22, 2027; Label: Weathermaker; Formats: LP, CD, digital	—	—	—	—	—	
"—" denotes a release that did not chart.

=== Live albums ===
Year	Album details
2002	Live at the Googolplex: Released: 2002; Label: River Road; Formats: CD
2004	Live in Flint, Michigan: Released: November 22, 2004; Label: River Road; Formats: CD
2007	Heard It All Before: Live at the HiFi Bar: Released: December 13, 2007; Label: New Found Frequency; Formats: CD
2008	Live at the Corner Hotel: Released: April 4, 2008; Label: New Found Frequency; Formats: CD
2008	Full Fathom Five: Audio Field Recordings (2007–2008): Released: September 9, 2008; Label: Weathermaker; Formats: CD
2010	Strange Cousins at the Prince: Released: February 25, 2010; Label: liveband.com.au; Formats: CD, MP3
2020	Live from the Doom Saloon Vol. 2: Released: August 7, 2020; Label: Weathermaker Music; Format: LP Vinyl
2020	Live from the Doom Saloon Vol. 3: Released: December 18, 2020; Label: Weathermaker Music; Format: LP Vinyl
2021	Live from the Doom Saloon Vol. 4: Released: November 26, 2021; Label: Weathermaker Music; Format: LP Vinyl
2023	PA Tapes - Copenhagen 23 Aug. 2022: Released: March 3, 2023; Label: Weathermaker Music; Format: Digital Download
2023	PA Tapes - Norfolk 25 Apr. 1993: Released: April 25, 2023; Label: Weathermaker Music; Format: Digital Download
2023	PA Tapes - Seattle 10 Oct. 2022: Released: July 12, 2023; Label: Weathermaker Music; Format: Digital Download
2023	PA Tapes - Nashville 24 Sep. 2022: Released: September 12, 2023; Label: Weathermaker Music; Format: Digital Download
2023	PA Tapes - Portland 9 Oct. 2022: Released: November 14, 2023; Label: Weathermaker Music; Format: Digital Download

=== Compilation albums ===
Year	Album details
2003	Slow Hole to China: Rare and Unreleased: Label: River Road Records; Formats: CD, LP
2005	Pitchfork & Lost Needles: Released: July 12, 2005; Label: Megaforce; Formats: CD
2015	La Curandera: Released: September 28, 2015; Label: Weathermaker; Formats: LP
2020	Monsters, Machines, and Mythological Beasts: Released: March 27, 2020; Label: Weathermaker; Formats: Digital
2020	The Weathermaker Vault Series, Volume 1: Released: November 27, 2020; Label: Weathermaker; Formats: CD, LP, Digital
2024	Slow Hole to China (2024 Remaster): Released: 5 July, 2024; Label: Weathermaker; Formats: CD, LP, Digital

=== Video albums ===
Year	Album details
2008	Full Fathom Five: Released: November 11, 2008; Label: Weathermaker; Formats: DVD
2010	Live at the 9:30: Label: Weathermaker; Formats: DVD

== Extended plays ==
Year	EP details
1991	Pitchfork: Label: Inner Journey; Formats: Vinyl, CD
1992	Passive Restraints: Label: Earache; Formats: Vinyl, CD
1997	Impetus: Label: Earache; Formats: CD
2012	Pigtown Blues: Label: Weathermaker; Formats: Vinyl
2014	Run, John Barleycorn, Run: Label: Weathermaker; Formats: Vinyl

== Singles ==
Year	Song	Peak chart positions	Album
Year	Song	US Main.	Album
1995	"Tight Like That"	—	Clutch
1998	"The Elephant Riders"	—	The Elephant Riders
2001	"Careful with That Mic..."	24	Pure Rock Fury
2001	"Immortal"	—	Pure Rock Fury
2002	"Pure Rock Fury"	—	Pure Rock Fury
2004	"The Mob Goes Wild"	39	Blast Tyrant
2005	"10001110101"	—	Robot Hive/Exodus
2005	"Mice and Gods"	—	Robot Hive/Exodus
2007	"Electric Worry"	38	From Beale Street to Oblivion
2009	"50,000 Unstoppable Watts"	—	Strange Cousins from the West
2012	"Pigtown Blues"	—	Non-album single
2013	"Earth Rocker"	—	Earth Rocker
2013	"Crucial Velocity"	—	Earth Rocker
2015	"X-Ray Visions"	—	Psychic Warfare
2018	"Gimme the Keys"	—	Book of Bad Decisions
2018	"How to Shake Hands"	—	Book of Bad Decisions
2018	"Hot Bottom Feeder"	—	Book of Bad Decisions
2018	"In Walks Barbarella"	—	Book of Bad Decisions
2026	"The Drifter Returns"	—	Wasted Lands
2026	"Wasted Lands"	—	Wasted Lands
2026	"Beware the Fever"	—	Wasted Lands
"—" denotes a release that did not chart.

data-sort-value="" style="background: var(--background-color-interactive, #ececec); color: var(--color-base, inherit); vertical-align: middle; text-align: center; " class="table-na" | —N/a

== Music videos ==
Year	Song	Director(s)
1992	"Wicker"	Hillary Johnson, Melissa Alonso
1993	"A Shogun Named Marcus"	Dan Winters
1998	"The Soapmakers"	unknown
2002	"Pure Rock Fury"	Stephen Smith
2004	"The Mob Goes Wild"	Bam Margera
2005	"Burning Beard"	Jeremy Hunt
2007	"Electric Worry"	Stephen Smith
2009	"50,000 Unstoppable Watts"	Jeremy Hunt
2013	"Crucial Velocity"	Aisha Tyler
2015	"X-Ray Visions"	Dan Winters
2016	"A Quick Death in Texas"	Dave Brodsky
2016	"Gone Cold"	Aisha Tyler
2018	"How to Shake Hands"	unknown
2018	"Hot Bottom Feeder"	unknown
2018	"In Walks Barbarella"	unknown
2019	"Ghoul Wrangler"	David Brodsky
2019	"Evil"	David Brodsky
2019	"Fortunate Son"	David Brodsky
2020	"Willie Nelson"	David Brodsky
2022	"Red Alert (Boss Metal Zone)"	David Brodsky
2022	"Slaughter Beach"	David Brodsky
2026	"Wasted Lands"	David Brodsky

== Other appearances ==
Year	Song	Album
2000	"Cross-Eyed Mary" (Jethro Tull cover)	Sucking the 70's
2006	"Red Hot Mama" (Funkadelic cover)	Sucking the 70's: Back in the Saddle Again
2007	"King of Arizona"	Viva la Bands, Vol. 2

== Unreleased material and B-sides ==
In addition to Slow Hole to China (remastered and re-released in 2009), Pitchfork & Lost Needles and Basket of Eggs, Clutch frequently hides B-sides or "Easter Eggs" on their albums. Some of these may be found in import version of classic albums, in deluxe packages (such as Earth Rocker: Deluxe Edition), in remasters and re-releases (such as those re-released on Weathermaker Music with bonus and live tracks), or as singles and EPs. Clutch has also released such songs for Record Store Day and even movie soundtracks. Some of these standalone songs, not generally attached to albums such as Slow Hole to China, Pitchfork and Lost Needles or Basket of Eggs, include:

No.	Title	Length
1.	"Molt"	6:51
2.	"The Wheel"	3:53
3.	"The Package"	4:43
4.	"Money" (Pink Floyd cover)	5:41
5.	"Neighborhood"	5:51
6.	"Apache" (Clutch outtake, appears on Big News EP)	7:27
7.	"Big News 3"	4:01
8.	"24 Earth Years" (The Elephant Riders era)	4:09
9.	"David Rose" (The Elephant Riders outtake)	4:31
10.	"Gifted & Talented" (The Elephant Riders outtake, appears on Wishbone Mini EP)	2:42
11.	"05" (The Elephant Riders outtake, appears on Wishbone Mini EP)	4:29
12.	"Cactus Mountain Blues"	9:51
13.	"Cross-Eyed Mary" (Jethro Tull cover, appears on Sucking the 70's)	3:33
14.	"Red Hot Mama" (Funkadelic cover with Five Horse Johnson; appears on Sucking the 70's - Back in the Saddle Again)	4:00
15.	"Metroliner Special" (Strange Cousins from the West outtake)	3:42
16.	"Pigtown Blues"	3:50
17.	"Motherless Child" (acoustic, appears on Pigtown Blues single)	4:10
18.	"Run, John Barleycorn, Run" (split single with Lionize for Record Store Day 2014)	5:01
19.	"Night Hag" (Earth Rocker outtake, appears on deluxe album version)	3:36
20.	"Scavengers" (Earth Rocker outtake, appears on deluxe album version)	4:05
21.	"We Need Some Money" (Psychic Warfare deluxe edition; Chuck Brown cover)	5:10
22.	"Outland Special Clearance" (Psychic Warfare deluxe edition)	3:17
23.	"Mad Sidewinder" (Psychic Warfare deluxe edition)	3:15
24.	"Boogeyman Blues" (Sunrise On Slaughter Beach Vinyl B-side)	2:56
25.	"Arts & Crafts" (Sunrise On Slaughter Beach Vinyl B-side)	3:33
26.	"Railroad Daisies" (Sunrise On Slaughter Beach Vinyl B-side)	4:16
Total length:		96:06

For Record Store Day 2014, Clutch released "Run, John Barleycorn, Run" as a split single with Lionize, featuring their song "Ether Madness". For 2015, Clutch released their 2009 album From Beale Street to Oblivion as a 2-LP set on purple vinyl, limited to 1,300 copies. For 2016, Clutch released an exclusive 12-inch vinyl EP with the two bonus tracks from their 2015 album "Psychic Warfare", containing "Mad Sidewinder" and "Outland Special Clearance", limited to 3,000 copies.
