= Wasted Lands =

Studio album by Clutch
- Released: January 22, 2027
- Recorded: 2025-2026
- Studios: Doom Saloon, Frederick, MD
- Genres: Stoner rock; hard rock; blues rock
- Length: 40:28
- Label: Weathermaker
- Producer: Machine

Clutch chronology
Sunrise on Slaughter Beach (2022)	Wasted Lands (2027)
- Singles: The Drifter Returns - August 28, 2026 Wasted Lands - September 25, 2026 Beware The Fever - November 10, 2026

Wasted Lands is the upcoming fourteenth studio album by American rock band Clutch. It will be released on January 22, 2027, through the band's own label Weathermaker Music.It will be the band's first album in five years since 2022's Sunrise on Slaughter Beach. The album was preceded by the singles "The Drifter Returns", "Wasted Lands", and "Beware The Fever". The album was produced by Machine who previously produced the band's albums Blast Tyrant, Earth Rocker and Psychic Warfare.The album was written and recorded at the band's home base Doom Saloon rehearsal studio in Frederick, MD.

== Track listing ==
All lyrics are written by Neil Fallon; all music is composed by Clutch.

Wasted Lands track listing
No.	Title	Length
1.	"The Drifter Returns"	3:17
2.	"Stage Fright"	3:19
3.	"Loaf 'N Jug"	3:30
4.	"High Class Action Lawsuit"	2:42
5.	"Chestburster"	3:33
6.	"Beware the Fever"	3:47
7.	"Wound Collector"	3:12
8.	"Colorado Fuel and Iron"	3:51
9.	"Streets Are His"	3:36
10.	"The Green Skull"	3:15
11.	"Wasted Lands"	3:14
12.	"The Message Is Clear"	3:12
Total length:		40:28

== Personnel ==
Clutch

- Neil Fallon – vocals, rhythm guitar
- Tim Sult – lead guitar
- Dan Maines – bass
- Jean-Paul Gaster – drums
