= Jam Room =

Studio album by Clutch
- Released: October 1, 1999; August 2004 (reissue)
- Recorded: May 1999
- Studio: Uncle Punchy Studios (Silver Spring, Maryland)
- Genre: Hard rock, stoner rock, blues rock, funk metal
- Length: 35:13 (original); 47:14 (reissue)
- Label: River Road; Megaforce (reissue)
- Producer: Clutch and Larry Packer

Clutch chronology
The Elephant Riders (1998)	Jam Room (1999)	Pure Rock Fury (2001)

Professional ratings
Review scores
Source	Rating
AllMusic	4/5 stars
Collector's Guide to Heavy Metal	8/10
Kerrang!	3/5 stars

Jam Room is the fourth full-length album by the American rock band Clutch, released in 1999 on the band's own label River Road Records.

== Album information ==
The initial limited release contained 12 tracks in 1999 and was a European release only to begin with, and had to be an import for their home country United States, but in 2004 it was reissued by Megaforce Records with three additional tracks, "The Drifter", "I Send Pictures", and "Sink 'Em Low" added to the album's song list.

The version of "Sink 'Em Low" found on the reissue is the demo version of the same track found on Pure Rock Fury, which is faster and heavier. The track "One Eye Dollar" was re-recorded in 2007 on the album From Beale Street to Oblivion.

It was another example of the band releasing demo versions to songs that would later become something slightly different, as they did with Impetus, Pitchfork & Lost Needles, and Slow Hole to China; the former being a reissue itself, the middle album a compilation of early material as well as unreleased, and the latter having its own reissue some years later with extra tracks, just like this album did.

It captures the various styles of the band, with a very diverse mix of punk / heavy roots, through their more stoner rocker styles, it adds some blues rock to the mix finally with unaccredited organ on some tracks (a style the band would embrace in the future much more prolifically) and continues with some of their funk metal efforts as well.

== Track listing ==
All songs written by Clutch.

No.	Title	Length
1.	"Who Wants to Rock?"	1:24
2.	"Big Fat Pig"	4:53
3.	"Going to Market"	2:00
4.	"One Eye Dollar"	1:13
5.	"Raised by Horses"	3:20
6.	"Bertha's Big Back Yard"	0:26
7.	"Gnome Enthusiast"	3:14
8.	"Swamp Boot Upside Down"	3:24
9.	"Basket of Eggs"	4:58
10.	"Release the Kraken"	3:35
11.	"The Drifter" (reissue)	4:29
12.	"I Send Pictures" (reissue)	3:35
13.	"Sink 'Em Low" (reissue)	3:56
14.	"Super Duper"	2:58
15.	"Release the Dub"	3:44
Total length:		47:14

== Personnel ==
- Neil Fallon - vocals
- Tim Sult - guitar
- Dan Maines - bass
- Jean-Paul Gaster - drums
- Delfeayo Marsalis - horns on "Release the Dub"
- Heartbeat - percussion on "I Send Pictures"
- Spoken word on "Release the Kraken" from the 'Brewers Dictionary of Phrases and Fables'

=== Production ===
- Produced by Clutch and Sir Lawrence Packer
- Recorded at Uncle Punchy Studios, Silver Spring, Maryland
- Engineering by Larry "Uncle Punchy" Packer
- Mastered at Masterdisk by Howie Weinberg
- Photography by Steve Truglio
