= Strange Cousins from the West =

Studio album by Clutch
- Released: July 13, 2009
- Recorded: March–April 2009
- Studio: The Magpie Gage (Baltimore)
- Genre: Stoner rock, hard rock, blues rock
- Length: 48:41
- Label: Weathermaker Music
- Producer: J. Robbins

Clutch chronology
Full Fathom Five (2008)	Strange Cousins from the West (2009)	Earth Rocker (2013)

Strange Cousins from the West is the ninth full-length studio album by the American rock band Clutch, released in the UK on July 13, 2009, and in the US on July 14.

== Album information ==
"Strange Cousins" was produced by J. Robbins--who previously worked with the band on Robot Hive/Exodus.

The album debuted at No. 38 on the Billboard 200 the week following its release with sales of 13,000 copies-- making it the band's highest debuting album. Following its release, Hammond organ player Mick Schauer, who had played with the band for the last two albums and their following tours, left the band. On May 13, 2009, the first single, "50,000 Unstoppable Watts" was released online. A video for this song was made available online on July 24, 2009. "Abraham Lincoln" can be listened to on the band's Ultimate Guitar profile.

In discussing the album's first single singer Neil Fallon said: "The song is more or less about where we rehearsed in Frederick, MD, next to an army base (Fort Detrick) where they do a lot of the chemical weapons manufacturing and testing. So, when I’m saying 'Anthrax' I’m talking about Anthrax the chemical weapon not the band. And there is a lot of ham radio operators-- well, old ham towers there. And one afternoon I was going to the liquor store and the lyrics just popped into my head after practice."

== Reception ==
Professional ratings
Review scores
Source	Rating
AllMusic	3.5/5 stars
NME	7/10
PopMatters	7/10

Initial critical response to Strange Cousins from the West was generally positive. At Metacritic (which assigns a normalized rating out of 100 to reviews from mainstream critics) the album received an average score of 72-- based on five reviews.

== Track listing ==
All songs written by Clutch, except "Algo Ha Cambiado" written by Norberto Aníbal Napolitano and originally recorded by his Argentine band Pappo's Blues.

No.	Title	Length
1.	"Motherless Child"	4:15
2.	"Struck Down"	4:23
3.	"50,000 Unstoppable Watts"	3:48
4.	"Abraham Lincoln"	5:58
5.	"Minotaur"	4:52
6.	"The Amazing Kreskin"	4:37
7.	"Witchdoctor"	4:11
8.	"Let a Poor Man Be"	5:31
9.	"Freakonomics"	3:21
10.	"Algo Ha Cambiado"	4:09
11.	"Sleestak Lightning"	3:47
12.	"Metroliner Special" (bonus track)	3:43

The track "Metroliner Special" is available as a bonus track on some releases of the CD, via special online merchandise orders and is also available for free at their official website to download.

== Personnel ==
- Neil Fallon – vocals, guitar
- Tim Sult – guitar
- Dan Maines – bass
- Jean-Paul Gaster – drums, percussion

=== Production ===
- Produced by Clutch and J. Robbins
- Engineered and mixed by J Robbins at the Magpie Gage, Baltimore, MD
- Mastered by Bob Weston at Chicago Mastering Service
- Design and artwork by Nick Lakiotes
- Photographs by Rick Malkin
- Assembly - Rich Warwick for Built By Icon
- Illustrations - Greg Franklin
- Management - Jack Flanagan for Issachar Entertainment / NYC

== Charts ==
Chart (2009)	Peak position
UK Albums (OCC)	95
US Billboard 200	38
