= The Elephant Riders =

Studio album by Clutch
- Released: April 14, 1998
- Recorded: 1997
- Studios: Electric Lady Studios (New York City); Manhattan Center Studios (New York City); Stonewall Studios (West Virginia)
- Genres: Stoner rock, funk metal, psychedelic rock, hard rock
- Length: 51:03
- Label: Columbia
- Producer: Jack Douglas

Clutch chronology
Impetus (1997)	The Elephant Riders (1998)	Jam Room (1999)

Professional ratings
Review scores
Source	Rating
AllMusic	3/5 stars
Collector's Guide to Heavy Metal	9/10
MusicHound Rock	2.5/5 stars
Scream Magazine	5/6
Wall of Sound	77/100

The Elephant Riders is the third full-length album by the band Clutch, released April 14, 1998, on Columbia Records, the only album Clutch made for the label.

== Recording and release ==
It was produced by Jack Douglas (whose other credits include The Who, Aerosmith, Blue Öyster Cult, John Lennon, James Gang and Mountain). The band convened in a 100-year-old house in West Virginia which they lodged in while making the album. Several incidents the band members experienced during their residence there became inspirations for some of the songs, notably in "The Soapmakers" and "Wishbone". Bassist Dan Maines had set up a BMX track in the yard surrounding the house.

== Background ==
The original concept for the title track and what became the title for the album, according to the bonus multimedia pack which came bundled with the original CD pressings, was an alternate history version of the Civil War in which airships were used for reconnaissance and the cavalry rode elephants rather than horses.

The album has a hidden track after the song "The Dragonfly". Each print of the album has one of three different hidden tracks. The Japanese version has all three hidden tracks.

The Elephant Riders is out-of-print. When asked about a possible reissue in 2012, vocalist Neil Fallon stated it was unlikely any time soon: "...maybe in the distant future [it] will revert to us, just because the terms of the contract will expire, but that’s not on our to-do list, because trying to talk to Sony’s lawyers is like launching a spacecraft."

== Commercial performance ==
The Elephant Riders debuted at number 104 on the Billboard 200, the first time a Clutch album had charted on the main chart, staying on the chart for one week.

By 2001, the album had sold 88,377 copies in the US.

== Track listing ==
All songs written by Clutch.

No.	Title	Length
1.	"The Elephant Riders"	3:50
2.	"Ship of Gold"	4:22
3.	"Eight Times Over Miss October"	4:21
4.	"The Soapmakers"	2:57
5.	"The Yeti"	4:59
6.	"Muchas Veces"	5:44
7.	"Green Buckets"	3:52
8.	"Wishbone"	3:43
9.	"Crackerjack"	5:10
10.	"The Dragonfly"	12:01
Total length:		51:03

The last track, "The Dragonfly", runs to 12:01 on the album itself; this is because each copy of the album contains one hidden track, after a few minutes silence. This gives most versions a run time of around 51 minutes, or 45:21 minutes without the extra track. The Japanese version of the album contains all three bonus tracks and has a longer run time of 57:01.

No.	Title	Length
11.	"David Rose"	4:30
12.	"Gifted & Talented"	2:41
13.	"05"	4:28
Total length:		57:01

The tracks listed below are unofficial bootlegs recorded during the album's sessions. They appear on an unofficial compilation called "Clutch: Rarities and B-Sides", alongside early hard-to-come-by Clutch songs. Its cover is a 'Clutch Cavalry - Pro-Rock' label. It is a precursor to the Slow Hole to China: Rare and Unreleased album the band would later release in 2003 under their own label, though it didn't have all of the bootlegged tracks from this unofficial release.

No.	Title	Length
1.	"Big News III"	4:00
2.	"Earth Years"	4:08

== Personnel ==
- Neil Fallon - vocals
- Tim Sult - guitar
- Dan Maines - bass
- Jean-Paul Gaster - drums
- Delfeayo Marsalis - trombone on "Crackerjack" & "Muchas Veces"

=== Production ===
- Produced by Jack Douglas
- Engineered and mixed by Jason Corsaro; except "Eight Times Over Miss October" which is mixed by Jack Joseph Puig
- Recorded at Electric Lady Studios and Manhattan Center Studios, New York City
- "Muchas Veces" and "Crackerjack" recorded by Larry Packer at Stonewall Studios, West Virginia
- Mixed at Avatar Studios, New York City, and Ocean Way Studios and Jack's Kingdom, Los Angeles
- Assistant engineers: Andy Salas, Kurt Garrison, Barbara Lipke, Jim Champagne
- Mastered by Howie Weinberg at Masterdisk, New York City
- Art direction: Sean Evans & Clutch
- Photography by Dan Winters

== Chart positions ==
Album

Year	Chart	Position
1998	The Billboard 200	#104
1998	Top Heatseekers	#1
