= Psychic Warfare =

Studio album by Clutch
- Released: October 2, 2015
- Studios: The Machine Shop, Austin, Texas; The Doom Saloon, Frederick, Maryland
- Genres: Stoner rock, hard rock, blues rock
- Length: 39:54
- Label: Weathermaker Music
- Producer: Machine

Clutch chronology
Earth Rocker (2013)	Psychic Warfare (2015)	Book of Bad Decisions (2018)

Professional ratings
Aggregate scores
Source	Rating
Metacritic	76/100
Review scores
Source	Rating
AllMusic	3.5/5 stars
AntiHero	8/10
Metal Injection	8/10
Pitchfork	6.9/10

Psychic Warfare is the eleventh studio album by the band Clutch, It was released on October 2, 2015, through the band's own label Weathermaker Music.

== Album info ==
Psychic Warfare has been released on: CD, Black & White, Newbury Comics Exclusive 500 Autographed Copy Limited Edition, Transparent Red, & UK Blue Vinyl, "Mad Sidewinder b/w Outland Special Clearance," a Record Store Day 12" 5000 Copy Limited Edition Vinyl Record, as well as a Digital-Only Deluxe Edition with bonus tracks.

Psychic Warfare was produced and mixed by "Machine" (aka Gene Freeman) who also worked with the band on previous albums: Pure Rock Fury, Blast Tyrant and Earth Rocker.

The album-package features photography and artwork by Dan Winters who has been collaborating with Clutch since their 1993 debut album Transnational Speedway League. The image is of the statue of Victory sculpted by Bela Pratt and mounted between the forward main guns of the first USS Massachusetts - the text on the statue's sword and foot inscriptions has been slightly modified. The album title comes from a line from the song "X-Ray Visions."

== Commercial performance ==
Psychic Warfare debuted at No. 1 on the Top Rock Albums Chart and No. 11 on Billboard 200-- selling 26,000 copies in the first week. This is the best chart-ranking achieved on both charts by the band as well as their best weekly sales.

== Track listing ==
All music written by Clutch except "Your Love is Incarceration" written by Clutch & Eugene Freeman (aka Machine) & "We Need Some Money" written by Chuck Brown & Curtis Johnson. All lyrics by Neil Fallon.

=== Original release ===
No.	Title	Length
1.	"The Affidavit"	0:25
2.	"X-Ray Visions"	3:42
3.	"Firebirds!"	3:00
4.	"A Quick Death in Texas"	3:57
5.	"Sucker for the Witch"	3:21
6.	"Your Love Is Incarceration"	3:14
7.	"Doom Saloon"	1:12
8.	"Our Lady of Electric Light"	3:51
9.	"Noble Savage"	2:49
10.	"Behold the Colossus"	3:51
11.	"Decapitation Blues"	3:11
12.	"Son of Virginia"	7:15
Total length:		39:54

=== Digital deluxe edition ===
Track 13-15 are bonus tracks on the deluxe edition.

No.	Title	Length
1.	"The Affidavit"	0:25
2.	"X-Ray Visions"	3:42
3.	"Firebirds!"	3:00
4.	"A Quick Death in Texas"	3:57
5.	"Sucker for the Witch"	3:21
6.	"Your Love Is Incarceration"	3:14
7.	"Doom Saloon"	1:12
8.	"Our Lady of Electric Light"	3:51
9.	"Noble Savage"	2:49
10.	"Behold the Colossus"	3:51
11.	"Decapitation Blues"	3:11
12.	"Son of Virginia"	7:15
13.	"Mad Sidewinder"	3:15
14.	"Outland Special Clearance"	3:17
15.	"We Need Some Money"	5:10
Total length:		51:36

== Personnel ==
Clutch

- Neil Fallon – vocals, rhythm guitar
- Tim Sult – lead guitar
- Dan Maines – bass
- Jean-Paul Gaster – drums

Technical personnel

- Machine – production, engineering & mixing
- Alberto De Icaza & Jeff Henson – engineering
- Paul Logus – mastering
- Dan Winters – art
- Andrew Massiatte Lopez – design

== Charts ==
Chart (2015)	Peak position
Australian Albums (ARIA)	23
Austrian Albums (Ö3 Austria)	65
Belgian Albums (Ultratop Flanders)	155
Belgian Albums (Ultratop Wallonia)	186
Canadian Albums (Billboard)	12
German Albums (Offizielle Top 100)	46
Swedish Albums (Sverigetopplistan)	18
Swiss Albums (Schweizer Hitparade)	46
Scottish Albums (Official Charts)	12
UK Albums (Official Charts)	20
UK Album Downloads (Official Charts)	23
UK Independent Albums (Official Charts)	5
UK Rock & Metal Albums (Official Charts)	2
US Billboard 200	11
US Independent Albums (Billboard)	2
US Top Hard Rock Albums (Billboard)	1
US Top Rock Albums (Billboard)	1
