= Full Fathom Five (album) =

Album by Clutch

Full Fathom Five: Audio Field Recordings

Live album by Clutch
- Released: September 9, 2008
- Recorded: 2007–2008
- Venue: The Metro Theatre, Sydney, Australia; Starland Ballroom, Sayreville, New Jersey; Mr. Smalls, Pittsburgh, Pennsylvania
- Genre: Stoner rock, hard rock, blues rock
- Length: 62:31
- Label: Weathermaker Music

Clutch chronology
From Beale Street to Oblivion (2007)	Full Fathom Five: Audio Field Recordings (2008)	Strange Cousins from the West (2009)

Full Fathom Five is a live album by the band Clutch. The full name of the album is Full Fathom Five: Audio Field Recordings, differentiating it from the accompanying DVD release Full Fathom Five: Video Field Recordings.

The DVD and Album differ in that four cities recorded at are on the DVD, but the album has only three cities, being: The Metro Theatre, Sydney, Australia (tracks 11–15, December 15, 2007); Starland Ballroom, Sayreville, New Jersey (tracks 4 & 5, December 29, 2007, and tracks 6 & 7, December 28, 2007); and Mr. Smalls, Pittsburgh, Pennsylvania (tracks 1–3 and 8–10, March 20, 2008).

The reference to the HiFi Bar as the Sydney concert in some source material is incorrect, as it is in Melbourne, Victoria, Australia (900 kilometers south of Sydney), which is from another live Australian recording, Heard It All Before: Live at the Hi Fi Bar. The same owners did open a venue in Sydney in 2012 with the same name.

== Track listing ==
No.	Title	Length
1.	"The Dragonfly"
2.	"Child of the City"
3.	"The Devil & Me"
4.	"Texan Book of the Dead"
5.	"Animal Farm"
6.	"The Mob Goes Wild"
7.	"Cypress Grove"
8.	"The Elephant Riders"
9.	"Ship of Gold"
10.	"The Yeti"
11.	"Promoter (Of Earthbound Causes)"
12.	"10001110101"
13.	"Mr. Shiny Cadillackness"
14.	"Electric Worry"
15.	"One Eye Dollar"

== Personnel ==
- Neil Fallon – vocals, guitar
- Tim Sult – guitar
- Dan Maines – bass
- Jean-Paul Gaster – drums, percussion
- Mick Schauer – Hammond B3, piano, Hohner clavinet
