= Robot Hive/Exodus =

Robot Hive / Exodus

Studio album by Clutch
- Released: June 21, 2005
- Studio: Bearsville, Uncle Punchy Studios, The Magpie Cage; 2005
- Genre: Stoner rock, hard rock, blues rock
- Length: 54:43
- Label: DRT Entertainment
- Producer: J. Robbins and Clutch

Clutch chronology
Blast Tyrant (2004)	Robot Hive / Exodus (2005)	Pitchfork & Lost Needles (2005)

Singles from Robot Hive/Exodus
- 1. "10001110101" Released: 2005; 2. "Mice and Gods" Released: 2005

Professional ratings
Review scores
Source	Rating
AllMusic	4/5 stars

Robot Hive / Exodus is the seventh full-length studio album by American rock band Clutch, released in 2005 on the DRT Entertainment label.

== Album information ==
The original release of the album contained 14 tracks, though it had 15 on some editions, namely the single and title track of the compilation album, Slow Hole to China: Rare and Unreleased. It included two blues covers, one originally by the legendary Howlin' Wolf and one by Mississippi Fred McDowell. It expands upon the band's musical virtuosity and their habit of playing various styles on their albums, especially exploring funk metal and blues rock, first touched upon in the prior album Blast Tyrant. Robot Hive/Exodus also signifies the beginning of keyboard player Mick Schauer's time with the band. Schauer would also contribute to their next album, From Beale Street to Oblivion, and subsequent tours.

== Reissues ==
A reissue of the album was released on September 28, 2010, with only the original 14 tracks, with a slightly different album cover design and an accompanying DVD of their performance at the "Sounds of the Underground" festival in July 2005.

In 2021, Clutch started a vinyl reissue series dubbed the "Clutch Collector's Series" in which each band member selected an album to remaster and reimagine. The 2004 album Blast Tyrant was the first installment, curated by Jean-Paul Gaster. The following year, Robot Hive/Exodus was the second installment as reimagined by bassist Dan Maines, getting a repress on vinyl limited to 7500 copies which included the album itself, as well as a band-signed insert and an extra 7" disc containing the songs "What Would A Wookie Do?" and "Bottoms Up, Socrates" both of which were included on the subsequent release Pitchfork & Lost Needles.

== In popular culture ==
- The song "Mice and Gods" was used as the entrance music for DaMarques Johnson at UFC 112.
- The song "10001110101" was featured in the video game Prey as a jukebox song.
- The song "Burning Beard" was featured in the video game MX vs. ATV Reflex.

== Track listing ==
All tracks written by Clutch, except where noted.

No.	Title	Writer(s)	Length
1.	"The Incomparable Mr. Flannery"		3:34
2.	"Burning Beard"		4:00
3.	"Gullah"		4:24
4.	"Mice and Gods"		3:55
5.	"Pulaski Skyway"		4:09
6.	"Never Be Moved"		4:04
7.	"10001110101"		5:00
8.	"Small Upsetters"		2:38
9.	"Circus Maximus"		3:42
10.	"Tripping the Alarm"		2:25
11.	"10,000 Witnesses"		3:29
12.	"Land of Pleasant Living"		4:06
13.	"Gravel Road"	Lyrics: Mississippi Fred McDowell	5:18
14.	"Who's Been Talking?"	Chester Burnett (Howlin' Wolf)	3:46
15.	"Slow Hole to China" (bonus track)		3:20
Total length:			54:43

Track 15 is included as a bonus track on some editions of this album.

"What Would A Wookie Do?" and "Bottoms Up, Socrates" were both recorded during the Robot Hive/Exodus sessions but appear on the compilation album Pitchfork & Lost Needles, which is a reissue of the original EP's Clutch released in the '90s; Pitchfork and Passive Restraints, and these 2005 session out-takes.

== Personnel ==
- Neil Fallon – vocals, guitar, percussion
- Tim Sult – guitar
- Dan Maines – bass
- Jean-Paul Gaster – drums, percussion
- Mick Schauer – Hammond Organ, Hohner Clavinet, Wurlitzer Electric Piano

=== Production ===
- Produced by Clutch and J. Robbins
- Recorded by J. Robbins at Bearsville Studios, Uncle Punchy Studios and the Magpie Gage
- Engineered by Chris Laidlaw and John Agnello at Bearsville Studios and Larry Packer at Uncle Punchy Studios
- Mixed by John Agnello and Assisted by Ted young at Water Music Records, Hoboken, New Jersey
- Mastered by Allan Douchess at West West Studio
- Art and layout by Nick Lakiotes for Six Point Harness

== Charts ==
Chart (2005)	Peak position
Billboard 200	94
