= Book of Bad Decisions =

Studio album by Clutch
- Released: September 7, 2018
- Studio: Sputnik Sound, Nashville, Tennessee
- Genre: Stoner rock; hard rock; blues rock
- Length: 56:54
- Label: Weathermaker Music
- Producer: Vance Powell

Clutch chronology
Psychic Warfare (2015)	Book of Bad Decisions (2018)	Sunrise on Slaughter Beach (2022)

Book of Bad Decisions is the twelfth studio album by American rock band Clutch, released on September 7, 2018, through the band's own label Weathermaker Music. It was released on CD, regular black vinyl, limited coke bottle clear vinyl and on picture disc, and was produced by Vance Powell.

== Reception ==
Professional ratings
Aggregate scores
Source	Rating
Metacritic	79/100
Review scores
Source	Rating
AllMusic	4/5 stars
Classic Rock	4.5/5 stars
Exclaim!	9/10
PopMatters	3/5 stars
Rolling Stone	3.5/5 stars
Sputnikmusic	3.5/5 stars

MetalSucks praised the album, calling it a "slightly disjointed record that sounds like the simmering undercurrent of disbelief, anxiety, and rage that lies just below the surface of the world today." Rolling Stone was also positive in their review, stating "Book of Bad Decisions is another solid latter-day Clutch record, bathed in the grit and liberal fuzz tone that have made their live shows legendary." Exclaim! gave the album a 9/10, stating that "this really needs to be said more, but Clutch are one of the best rock acts of the modern era".

== Track listing ==
All songs written by Clutch.

No.	Title	Length
1.	"Gimme the Keys"	3:33
2.	"Spirit of '76"	3:39
3.	"Book of Bad Decisions"	3:23
4.	"How to Shake Hands"	3:52
5.	"In Walks Barbarella"	3:49
6.	"Vision Quest"	3:18
7.	"Weird Times"	3:09
8.	"Emily Dickinson"	5:06
9.	"Sonic Counselor"	3:28
10.	"A Good Fire"	3:44
11.	"Ghoul Wrangler"	4:28
12.	"H.B. Is in Control"	3:01
13.	"Hot Bottom Feeder"	3:34
14.	"Paper & Strife"	3:02
15.	"Lorelei"	5:48
Total length:		56:54

== Personnel ==
Clutch

- Neil Fallon – vocals, rhythm guitar
- Tim Sult – lead guitar
- Dan Maines – bass
- Jean-Paul Gaster – drums

Additional personnel

- Chris Brooks – Hammond B3, wurlitzer and piano on "Book of Bad Decisions", "In Walks Barbarella", "Emily Dickinson", "Sonic Counselor", "Vision Quest" and "Hot Bottom Feeder"
- Mike Dillon – percussion, vibraphone on "In Walks Barbarella", "Hot Bottom Feeder", "Book of Bad Decisions" and "Lorelei"
- Kevin Gatzke – tenor, baritone saxophone and horn arrangement on "In Walks Barbarella"
- Vinnie Ciesielski – trumpet
- Roy Agee – trombone and bass trombone

Technical personnel

- Vance Powell – production, engineering and mixing
- Michael Fahey – production assistant
- Paul Logus – mastering

== Charts ==
Chart (2018)	Peak position
Australian Albums (ARIA)	57
Austrian Albums (Ö3 Austria)	22
Belgian Albums (Ultratop Flanders)	89
Belgian Albums (Ultratop Wallonia)	87
Canadian Albums (Billboard)	42
German Albums (Offizielle Top 100)	15
Hungarian Albums (MAHASZ)	17
Scottish Albums (OCC)	9
Swedish Albums (Sverigetopplistan)	26
Swiss Albums (Schweizer Hitparade)	20
UK Albums (OCC)	13
UK Independent Albums (OCC)	2
UK Rock & Metal Albums (OCC)	1
US Billboard 200	16
