= Impetus (album) =

EP by Clutch
- Released: 1997
- Recorded: 1991–1992
- Studio: Uncle Punchy Studios (Silver Spring, Maryland)
- Genre: Stoner rock; post-hardcore; alternative metal
- Length: 19:24
- Label: Earache Records

Clutch chronology
Clutch (1995)	Impetus (1997)	The Elephant Riders (1998)

Professional ratings
Review scores
Source	Rating
AllMusic	2/5 stars

Impetus is a reissue of the EP Passive Restraints by the band Clutch in 1997.

== Album information ==
The EP has two tracks added to it from the Naive album, a compilation of bands that Earache Records put out in 1992, which has since been unavailable due to a lawsuit from Evian, as the album cover looked exactly like the bottled water logo it uses. The contents of this EP are the same as the original, with a demo version of the title track added, and the song "Pile Driver" from the 12" vinyl edition of Pitchfork from 1991.

In late 2018, the EP was reissued on vinyl, using the artwork from the original three-track Passive Restraints release.

== Track listing ==
No.	Title	Length
1.	"Impetus" (Demo)	3:17
2.	"Pile Driver"	2:30
3.	"Passive Restraints"	3:01
4.	"Impetus"	3:31
5.	"High Caliber Consecrator"	7:03

== Personnel ==
- Neil Fallon - vocals
- Tim Sult - guitar
- Dan Maines - bass
- Jean-Paul Gaster - drums

Production

- Produced by "Uncle Punchy" Lawrence Packer at Uncle Punchy Studios in Silver Spring, Maryland

== Trivia ==
- The song "Impetus" was featured in the Tony Hawk's Underground soundtrack.
