= Live at the Googolplex =

Live album by Clutch
- Released: 2002; June 17, 2003 (reissue)
- Recorded: 2001–2003
- Genre: Stoner rock, hard rock, blues rock, funk metal, alternative metal
- Label: River Road, Megaforce

Clutch chronology
Pure Rock Fury (2001)	Live at the Googolplex (2002)	Slow Hole to China: Rare and Unreleased (2003)

Professional ratings
Review scores
Source	Rating
AllMusic	3.5/5 stars
Collector's Guide to Heavy Metal	8/10

Live at the Googolplex is a live album by American rock band Clutch, compiled from various live recordings on the Pure Rock Fury tour. Sources differ on the album's recording dates. According to some sources, it was recorded in Chicago (tracks 1–4, 12 & 13); Montreal (tracks 5, 6, 10 & 11); Kansas City (tracks 7–9) and Columbus, Ohio (tracks 14 & 15) on the tour dates of February 19 & 21, March 1 & 2 in 2002 and in early 2003, on the Pure Rock Fury North American tour; but it could also have been from 2001 and 2002 era recordings.

== Track listing ==
No.	Title	Length
1.	"Who Wants to Rock?"	1:17
2.	"Pure Rock Fury"	3:15
3.	"Sea of Destruction"	2:44
4.	"Immortal"	2:56
5.	"Careful with That Mic..."	5:25
6.	"Impetus"	3:28
7.	"El Jefe"	3:27
8.	"Rock and Roll Outlaw"	2:32
9.	"12 oz Epilogue"	2:13
10.	"Big News I"	5:31
11.	"Big News II"	2:44
12.	"Brazenhead"	5:51
13.	"The Soapmakers"	4:44
14.	"Escape from the Prison Planet"	5:52
15.	"Rats"	2:58
Total length:		54:57

== Personnel ==
- Neil Fallon – vocals
- Tim Sult – guitar
- Dan Maines – bass
- Jean-Paul Gaster – drums

Production

- Produced by Clutch
- Recorded by Lee Britnail
- Mixed by Greg Clark
- Mastered by Lawrence Packer
