= Earth Rocker =

Studio album by Clutch
- Released: March 15, 2013
- Recorded: October 2012
- Genres: Stoner rock, hard rock, blues rock
- Length: 44:21
- Label: Weathermaker Music
- Producer: Machine

Clutch chronology
| Strange Cousins from the West (2009) | Earth Rocker (2013) | Psychic Warfare (2015) |

Earth Rocker is the tenth studio album by American rock band Clutch. It was released on March 15, 2013 by Weathermaker Music. Earth Rocker is the first studio album to be released by Clutch since Strange Cousins from the West in 2009. The album was produced by Machine, who also produced the band's 2004 album Blast Tyrant.

== Background ==
Earth Rocker has been described as heavier and faster than the preceding albums. Drummer J.P. Gaster revealed that this ferocity may be attributed to Clutch's recent touring experience with Motörhead and Thin Lizzy:

"It was on that tour [with Thin Lizzy] that we realized there was really a lack of just straight up rock and roll records coming out these days. So I think we wanted to make something that was, front to back, a very focused kind of a recording. A very efficient kind of recording. One that had good energy from the very beginning to the end."

Clutch recorded 14 songs, although only 11 made it on the album. Frontman Neil Fallon expressed the opinion that they were "great songs", but the band was

"...committed to keeping this record in classic LP length...I think there's something to be said about the fact that you've got a side A and side B, and it still translates when you listen to those albums on CD. Whether you're listening to Paranoid or Dark Side of the Moon, when you listen to the tracks one through ten, there's a bit of a plot arc. I think we were cognizant of that when we were putting this thing together."

== Songwriting and recording ==
The band took a different approach to the songwriting for Earth Rocker by engaging in extensive pre-production work to flesh out the songs more fully prior to entering the studio. Dan Maines attributed this to the recording preferences of the producer, Machine, who "likes to have all the material in the bag before he hits record." The band recorded to a click track at its rehearsal space and then played along in the studio. As Maines explained, "the idea of doing any 'jamming' doesn't enter the picture. Our intent with these songs was to end up with something that had an intense focus of energy; each song needed to be direct with a no frills punch."

This had a cascading effect upon other aspects of the songs, with Tim Sult noting that the approach resulted in additional soloing: "I would've never expected to be playing as many solos on this album, but they definitely had more of a direction than they usually do. It definitely took a lot more concentration, but I walked away from this album liking them more than I have on any other album."

Neil Fallon opined that the planned songwriting approach resulted from a lack of satisfaction with aspects of previous albums:

"In the past, we would go into the studio and write. That never worked out to anyone's satisfaction. It was really important to do a lot of pre-production, knowing exactly what we would be doing when we went into the studio. It was crucial that we did all that prior to hitting 'record'...it was so mapped out that we weren't even in the studio together. You had to take a lot on faith. But once you know a part inside and out, you can move on to worrying about performance. If you're trying to remember it, then you're not playing from the heart - you're playing from the brain. That always sounds stale on playback."

== Reception ==
Professional ratings
Aggregate scores
| Source | Rating |
|---|---|
| Metacritic | 72/100 |
Review scores
| Source | Rating |
| About.com | 4.5/5 stars |
| AllMusic | 3.5/5 stars |
| Exclaim! | 8/10 |
| Metalinjection.net | 8/10 |
| Powerline | 4.5/5 stars |
| Sputnikmusic | 5/5 stars |

The album met with generally favorable reviews, with About.com comparing it to Blast Tyrant and praising it for "kick(ing) harder than a mule on steroids". Metal Injection described Earth Rocker as "a consistently rocking and rolling beast. On the journey through the world of modern hard-rock, Clutch is like the mad village storyteller. You might not get what he's trying to tell you right away, but after a while you discover he's the one you should have listened to all along." However, Q Magazine criticized the album as being "business as usual" despite being "a little more concise than their usual output".

The album debuted at No. 15 on the Billboard 200 and No. 6 on the Top Rock Albums chart, selling 22,000 copies in its first week. The album has sold 80,000 copies in the United States as of September 2015.

== Track listing ==
All tracks written by Clutch.

=== Original release ===
| No. | Title | Length |
|---|---|---|
| 1. | "Earth Rocker" | 3:31 |
| 2. | "Crucial Velocity" | 3:59 |
| 3. | "Mr. Freedom" | 2:43 |
| 4. | "D.C. Sound Attack!" | 4:37 |
| 5. | "Unto the Breach" | 3:29 |
| 6. | "Gone Cold" | 4:20 |
| 7. | "The Face" | 4:22 |
| 8. | "Book, Saddle, & Go" | 3:43 |
| 9. | "Cyborg Bette" | 3:13 |
| 10. | "Oh, Isabella" | 5:17 |
| 11. | "The Wolf Man Kindly Requests…" | 5:02 |
| Total length: | | 44:21 |

=== 2014 deluxe edition ===
A three-disc deluxe edition of Earth Rocker was released on June 24, 2014, containing the original album with two bonus tracks, a live recording of the album (originally only available on vinyl) on CD, and a live DVD of the show played at the Ogden Theatre, Denver, on November 14, 2013. It also has new artwork and liner notes.

Disc one
| No. | Title | Length |
|---|---|---|
| 1. | "Earth Rocker" | 3:31 |
| 2. | "Crucial Velocity" | 4:01 |
| 3. | "Mr. Freedom" | 2:44 |
| 4. | "Night Hag" | 3:36 |
| 5. | "D.C. Sound Attack!" | 4:38 |
| 6. | "Unto the Breach" | 3:31 |
| 7. | "Gone Cold" | 4:21 |
| 8. | "The Face" | 4:22 |
| 9. | "Book, Saddle, & Go" | 3:45 |
| 10. | "Cyborg Bette" | 3:14 |
| 11. | "Oh, Isabella" | 5:18 |
| 12. | "Scavengers" | 4:03 |
| 13. | "The Wolf Man Kindly Requests..." | 5:03 |
| Total length: | | 52:07 |

Disc two – Live
| No. | Title | Venue | Length |
|---|---|---|---|
| 1. | "Earth Rocker" (May 25, 2013) | House of Blues – Houston, TX | 3:33 |
| 2. | "Crucial Velocity" (May 26, 2013) | Meltdown Festival – San Antonio, TX | 4:03 |
| 3. | "Mr. Freedom" (May 25, 2013) | House of Blues – Houston, TX | 2:45 |
| 4. | "D.C. Sound Attack!" (May 23, 2013) | Bourbon Theater – Lincoln, ND | 4:05 |
| 5. | "Unto the Breach" (May 19, 2013) | The Vogue – Indianapolis, IN | 3:30 |
| 6. | "Gone Cold" (May 23, 2013) | Bourbon Theater – Lincoln, ND | 4:51 |
| 7. | "The Face" (May 25, 2013) | House of Blues – Houston, TX | 4:13 |
| 8. | "Book, Saddle, & Go" (May 26, 2013) | Meltdown Festival – Houston, TX | 3:47 |
| 9. | "Cyborg Battle" (May 25, 2013) | House of Blues – Houston, TX | 3:14 |
| 10. | "Oh, Isabella" (May 19, 2013) | The Vogue – Indianapolis, IN | 5:14 |
| 11. | "The Wolf Man Kindly Requests..." (May 22, 2013) | The Venue – Fargo, ND | 5:03 |
| Total length: | | | 44:18 |

- The songs "Night Hag" and "Scavengers" are the bonus tracks on the deluxe edition.

== Personnel ==
Clutch

- Neil Fallon – vocals, guitar, harmonica, percussion
- Tim Sult – guitar
- Dan Maines – bass
- Jean-Paul Gaster – drums, percussion

Technical personnel

- Machine – production, engineering and mixing
- Alberto De Icaza – additional engineering and editing
- Randy LeBouf – editing
- Zakk Cervini and Justin Aufdemkampe – assistant to producer
- Paul Logus – mastering

== Chart performance ==
| Chart (2013) | Peak position |
|---|---|
| Belgian Albums (Ultratop Wallonia) | 172 |
| Finnish Albums (Suomen virallinen lista) | 50 |
| German Albums (Offizielle Top 100) | 71 |
| Norwegian Albums (VG-lista) | 13 |
| Scottish Albums (Official Charts) | 39 |
| Swedish Albums (Sverigetopplistan) | 14 |
| US Billboard 200 | 15 |
| US Top Hard Rock Albums (Billboard) | 1 |
| US Top Rock Albums (Billboard) | 6 |
