= Pitchfork & Lost Needles =

Compilation album by Clutch
- Released: July 12, 2005
- Recorded: 1991–2005
- Genre: Stoner rock, post-hardcore, alternative metal
- Label: Megaforce Records

Clutch chronology
Robot Hive/Exodus (2005)	Pitchfork & Lost Needles (2005)	From Beale Street to Oblivion (2007)

Professional ratings
Review scores
Source	Rating
AllMusic	4/5 stars

Pitchfork & Lost Needles is a Clutch compilation album, released in 2005, of previous EPs by the band, with some demos and session outtakes.

== Album information ==
The album is a mix of original EPs from the early 1990s, being; the 4 track debut EP Pitchfork in 1991; the 3 track EP Passive Restraints in 1992. Tracks 1–4 are from the first EP, reissued here for the first time since 1991. Track 5, "Nero's Fiddle", is an early incarnation of "High Caliber Consecrator" from the EP Passive Restraints and which track 6 is the demo version of. Track 7 & 8 are the demo versions from the debut full-length album Transnational Speedway League and tracks 9 & 10 are from the Robot Hive/Exodus sessions in 2005 with Mick Schauer still in the band playing organ.

== Track listing ==
No.	Title	Length
1.	"Wicker"	3:30
2.	"Arcadia"	3:00
3.	"Juggernaut"	3:37
4.	"Far Country"	3:49
5.	"Nero's Fiddle"	3:33
6.	"Passive Restraints" (demo)	3:02
7.	"Bacchanal" (demo)	3:49
8.	"Milk of Human Kindness" (demo)	4:09
9.	"What Would a Wookie Do?"	4:26
10.	"Bottoms Up, Socrates"	3:40

== Personnel ==
- Neil Fallon – vocals, guitar
- Tim Sult – guitar
- Dan Maines – bass
- Jean-Paul Gaster – drums
- Mick Schauer – Hammond organ, Wurlitzer piano, clavinet
- Mark Stanley – guitar on tracks 2 & 3
- Scott Crawford – guitar on tracks 1 & 4

Production

- Produced by Clutch and J Robbins
- Recorded by Larry "Uncle Punchy" Packer
- Mixed by J Robbins and John Agnello
- Engineering by Chris Laidlaw, Larry "Uncle Punchy" Packer and Ted Young
