= Pitchfork (album) =

EP by Clutch
- Released: October 1991
- Recorded: 1991
- Studio: Uncle Punchy Studios, Silver Spring, Maryland
- Genre: Stoner rock, post-hardcore, alternative metal
- Length: 16:26
- Label: Inner Journey Records
- Producer: Clutch, Larry Packer

Clutch chronology
Pitchfork (1991)	Passive Restraints (1992)

Pitchfork is the debut EP by American rock band Clutch, released on vinyl 7" & 12" in October 1991 only in the US.

== Recording and release ==
There was the standard black vinyl pressing of the album, in 7" & 12". It also had a gold and a clear pressing (both rare), plus some misprinted versions, all only numbering in the 100s. It was released on the now defunct label 'Inner Journey Records'.

The 12" version had the extra track "Pile Driver", which would be released again on the EP Impetus, the reissue of Passive Restraints, their second EP. The tracks that form the EP were eventually reissued on the compilation album, Pitchfork & Lost Needles, which released in 2005, making it nearly 15 years since most people had heard the songs.

Mark Stanley and Scott Crawford also played guitar on the album and would both collaborate with the band again in later years.

== Background ==
The debut from Clutch was released in the beginnings of the Stoner Rock era of Sleep and Kyuss, but is considered a Punk/Heavy Metal/Hardcore album, as this is what the band members identified more with at the time.

It was not able to be purchased for some years, except as a second hand EP. Except in live sets by the band, the tracks were not heard by most fans until 1999, with its reissue on CD. It would also be the first of many recordings done with Larry "Uncle Punchy" Packer as the producer/engineer over the course of the band's career.

== Track listing ==
All tracks written by Clutch.

=== 7" vinyl EP ===
Side one
No.	Title	Length
1.	"Wicker"	3:30
2.	"Arcadia"	3:00

Side two
No.	Title	Length
1.	"Juggernaut"	3:37
2.	"Far Country"	3:49

=== 12" vinyl EP ===
No.	Title	Length
3.	"Pile Driver"	2:30
Total length:		16:26

== Personnel ==
- Neil Fallon – vocals
- Tim Sult – guitars
- Dan Maines – bass
- Jean-Paul Gaster – drums
- Mark Stanley – guitars
- Scott Crawford – guitars

Production

- Produced by Lawrence Packer at Uncle Punchy Studios, Silver Spring, Maryland
