= Sunrise on Slaughter Beach =

Studio album by Clutch
- Released: September 16, 2022
- Recorded: 2021
- Studios: The Magpie Cage Recording Studio, Baltimore, Maryland
- Genres: Stoner rock; hard rock; blues rock
- Length: 33:10
- Label: Weathermaker
- Producer: Tom Dalgety

Clutch chronology
Book of Bad Decisions (2018)	Sunrise on Slaughter Beach (2022)	Wasted Lands (2027)

Singles from Sunrise on Slaughter Beach
- 1. "Red Alert (Boss Metal Zone)" Released: April 5, 2022; 2. "We Strive for Excellence" Released: June 14, 2022; 3. "Slaughter Beach" Released: August 16, 2022

Sunrise on Slaughter Beach is the thirteenth studio album by American rock band Clutch. It was released on September 16, 2022, through the band's own label Weathermaker Music. It is Clutch's most recent studio album, preceded by 2018's Book of Bad Decisions. The album was originally intended as a positive counterpoint to the social volatility and divisiveness caused by the COVID-19 pandemic, but the lyrics eventually touched on a more diverse range of social topics.

== Critical reception ==
Professional ratings
Aggregate scores
Source	Rating
Metacritic	81/100
Review scores
Source	Rating
AllMusic	3.5/5 stars
Blabbermouth.net	8/10
Classic Rock	4.5/5 stars
Distorted Sound	8/10
Kerrang!	4/5 stars
Metal Hammer	4/5 stars
Metal Injection	9/10
MetalSucks	4.5/5 stars
Rock 'N' Load	8/10
Sputnikmusic	3.8/5

The album has an average score of 81 out of 100 on Metacritic based on 6 professional reviews, indicating "universal acclaim". According to Blabbermouth.net, the album fits within Clutch's long-term development, "never taking any drastic left turns, though progression and noticeable change has been evident over time." MetalSucks largely agreed, stating that "Sunrise on Slaughter Beach is your typical Clutch record," but "there’s always a little more going on under the hood of any Clutch offering." Kerrang! offered a positive review, stating that "13 albums in, Clutch are still uniquely brilliant, master craftsmen of a form at once ingeniously simple and amazingly clever." Metal Injection called the album "grand without pomposity, experimental without an inch of fat and underwritten with grooves so thick you could build a bridge out of them." According to Metal Planet Music, "Clutch have delivered a monster album here. It’s dirty, sludgy, heavy as hell and trippy when it needs to be." Rock 'N' Load wrote in their review, "Sunrise on Slaughter Beach is a grand entrance into newfound Clutch territory not seen before. Whilst still harnessing their iconic sound, the band have managed to widen their range and prove themselves once more pioneers; unafraid of throwing out a curveball."

== Track listing ==
All lyrics are written by Neil Fallon; all music is composed by Clutch.

Sunrise on Slaughter Beach track listing
No.	Title	Length
1.	"Red Alert (Boss Metal Zone)"	2:45
2.	"Slaughter Beach"	3:41
3.	"Mountain of Bone"	4:23
4.	"Nosferatu Madre"	3:27
5.	"Mercy Brown"	5:15
6.	"We Strive for Excellence"	2:55
7.	"Skeletons on Mars"	4:10
8.	"Three Golden Horns"	3:26
9.	"Jackhammer Our Names"	3:08
Total length:		33:10

Limited Edition / "The Complete Edition" bonus tracks
No.	Title	Length
10.	"Boogeyman Blues"	2:55
11.	"Arts and Crafts"	3:33
12.	"Railroad Daisies"	4:16
Total length:		43:54

== Personnel ==
Clutch

- Neil Fallon – vocals, rhythm guitar
- Tim Sult – lead guitar
- Dan Maines – bass
- Jean-Paul Gaster – drums, vibraphone

Additional personnel

- J. Robbins – theremin
- Deborah Bond – backing vocals
- Frenchie Davis – backing vocals

Production

- Tom Dalgety – production, mixing

== Charts ==
Chart performance for Sunrise on Slaughter Beach
Chart (2022)	Peak position
Australian Digital Albums (ARIA)	7
Australian Hitseekers Albums (ARIA)	12
German Albums (Offizielle Top 100)	54
Scottish Albums (Official Charts)	99
Swiss Albums (Schweizer Hitparade)	59
UK Independent Albums (Official Charts)	23
UK Rock & Metal Albums (Official Charts)	4
US Billboard 200	89
US Independent Albums (Billboard)	12
US Top Hard Rock Albums (Billboard)	3
US Top Rock Albums (Billboard)	16
