= Clutch (Clutch album) =

Studio album by Clutch
- Released: May 9, 1995
- Recorded: December 1994 – January 1995
- Studio: Uncle Punchy Studios (Silver Spring, Maryland)
- Genre: Stoner rock; hard rock; blues rock; funk metal
- Length: 55:05
- Label: East West Records
- Producer: Clutch and Larry Packer

Clutch chronology
Transnational Speedway League (1993)	Clutch (1995)	Impetus (1997)

Professional ratings
Review scores
Source	Rating
AllMusic	4/5 stars
Collector's Guide to Heavy Metal	9/10
MusicHound Rock	3.5/5 stars

Clutch is the second full-length album by American rock band Clutch. It was released on May 9, 1995 through East West Records. The album is considered a staple of the 1990s stoner rock genre.

== Recording and release ==
Clutch saw the return of "Uncle Punchy" Lawrence Packer to the production of the album and a return to Uncle Punchy Studios in Silver Spring, Maryland.

== Music and lyrics ==
This album captures the band's modus operandi of exploring new styles and genres, with an apparent injection of funk metal into the songs, drawing comparisons to Primus. The album is considered to be the point where the band had begun to evolve and expand on their stoner and blues rock roots. The record also retains their punk metal style, containing some heavier tracks. As with the band's previous releases, the influence of Black Sabbath and Led Zeppelin is apparent in the tracks. Additionally, the guitars are more prominent in the album's mix than on previous releases by the band. The album features some of their more "spacey" pieces such as "Big News", "Escape from the Prison Planet", "I Have the Body of John Wilkes Booth", and "Spacegrass".

The album's lyrics explore themes relating to outer space.

== Legacy ==
It is the band's best-selling album in the US, at over 138,730 copies to date. The album still receives regular live coverage with at least half the album's track list making their live performances on a regular basis, over 20 years after its first release. The album now enjoys cult status among fans of the genre.

== Track listing ==
All music and lyrics written by Clutch.

No.	Title	Length
1.	"Big News I"	5:13
2.	"Big News II"	2:23
3.	"Rock n' Roll Outlaw"	2:59
4.	"Texan Book of the Dead"	2:57
5.	"Escape from the Prison Planet"	4:53
6.	"Spacegrass"	6:33
7.	"I Have the Body of John Wilkes Booth"	4:27
8.	"Tight Like That"	4:49
9.	"Animal Farm"	2:01
10.	"Droid"	4:43
11.	"The House That Peterbilt"	3:32
12.	"7 Jam"	6:18
13.	"Tim Sult vs. The Greys"	4:11
Total length:		55:05

The Japanese release of the album contains the bonus track "Apache", which was initially released on the radio only promotional EP 'Big News', along with a demo version of "Spacegrass", which has never been reissued to date. It would appear on the bootleg 'Clutch: Rarities and B-Side' some years later.

No.	Title	Length
14.	"Apache"	7:23

== Personnel ==
- Neil Fallon – vocals
- Tim Sult – guitar
- Dan Maines – bass
- Jean-Paul Gaster – drums
- Richard Morel – organ (on tracks 5, 7, 12 and 13)

=== Production ===
- Production and engineering by Larry "Uncle Punchy" Packer at Uncle Punchy Studios in Silver Spring, Maryland
- Mixing by Steve Thompson, Michael Barbiero and Jay Ryan - "Uncle Punchy" on tracks 3 and 8
- Assistant engineering by Mike Hamady and Jay Ryan
- Digital engineering by Danio Saratak
- Mastered by Greg Calbi
- A&R representation by Wendy Berry
- Management by Jon Goldwater
- Photography by Dan Winters
- Design by Jennifer Roddie
- 3D typography by Rob Eberhardt

== Charting positions ==
Album

Year	Chart	Position
1995	Top Heatseekers	33
