= Pure Rock Fury =

Studio album by Clutch
- Released: March 13, 2001
- Recorded: September 2000
- Venue: 9:30 Club (Washington, D.C.)
- Studio: Uncle Punchy Studios (Silverspring, MD); IIWII (Weehawken, NJ); The Machine Shop (Hoboken, NJ); Show Place Studios (Dover, NJ)
- Genre: Stoner rock, hard rock, blues rock, funk metal
- Length: 61:24
- Label: Atlantic
- Producer: Uncle Punchy, Machine, Clutch

Clutch chronology
Jam Room (1999)	Pure Rock Fury (2001)	Live at the Googolplex (2002)

Professional ratings
Review scores
Source	Rating
AllMusic	4/5 stars
Kerrang!	5/5 stars
NME	8/10

Pure Rock Fury is the fifth album by American rock band Clutch, released on March 13, 2001, and is their only album release with Atlantic Records. The album liner notes state that it is dedicated to Ronnie True.

== Album information ==
This album features guest appearances by Scott "Wino" Weinrich (The Obsessed, Saint Vitus, Spirit Caravan), Leslie West (Mountain), and Dan and Joe of Sixty Watt Shaman, highlighting the band's habit of having musical contemporaries play on their albums.

The album yielded a minor hit with "Careful with That Mic...", a rap rock parody, which CMJ complimented for its clever rhymes. The song "Immortal" was originally released with different lyrics and arrangement as the song "Baby I'm Down" by Leslie West on his debut album Mountain. Clutch rearranged it and changed the lyrics somewhat, and it features a guitar solo by the original author, Leslie West, on it, who then had his band Mountain cover this Clutch version on their Mystic Fire album the following year.

Clutch vocalist Neil Fallon has stated in an interview that of all Clutch's albums, Pure Rock Fury is his least favourite.

== In popular culture ==
The song "Immortal" is featured in the video game Hitman: Contracts. The song "Pure Rock Fury" is featured in the video game MotorStorm: Pacific Rift.

== Track listing ==
All songs written by Clutch.

No.	Title	Length
1.	"American Sleep"	4:18
2.	"Pure Rock Fury"	3:21
3.	"Open Up the Border"	3:45
4.	"Careful with That Mic..."	3:27
5.	"Red Horse Rainbow"	5:58
6.	"The Great Outdoors!"	3:47
7.	"Smoke Banshee"	3:33
8.	"Frankenstein"	5:41
9.	"Sinkemlow"	3:55
10.	"Immortal"	3:39
11.	"Brazenhead"	6:28
12.	"Drink to the Dead"	5:58
13.	"Spacegrass (Live)"	7:28
Total length:		61:24

== Personnel ==
- Neil Fallon – vocals, guitars on "Brazenhead", organ on "Careful With That Mic..."
- Tim Sult – guitar
- Dan Maines – bass
- Jean-Paul Gaster – drums
- Scott "Wino" Weinrich – guitar solo on "Red Horse Rainbow" (left channel), guitars on "Brazenhead"
- Heartbeat – congas on "Frankenstein" and "Brazenhead", additional vocals on "Brazenhead"
- Leslie West – guitars and additional vocals on "Immortal"
- Dan Kerzwyck (Sixty Watt Shaman) – additional vocals on "Sinkemlow"
- Joe Selby (Sixty Watt Shaman) – guitar solo on "Frankenstein" (right channel)
- Machine – additional vocals on "Careful With That Mic..."

=== Production ===
- All songs produced by Lawrence "Uncle Punchy" Packer:
  "Open Up the Border" produced by Machine and Uncle Punchy
  "Careful with That Mic..." & "Drink to the Dead" produced by Machine
  "Immortal" produced by Jason Corsaro & Leslie West
- All songs recorded by Larry Packer at Uncle Punchy Studios, Silver Spring, MD except:
  "Careful with That Mic..." recorded by Machine at IIWII, Weehawken, NJ, The Machine Shop, Hoboken, NJ and Uncle Punchy Studios
  "Immortal" recorded by Jason Corsaro at Show Place Studios, Dover, NJ
- All songs mixed by Jason Corsaro at Show Place Studios, Dover, NJ except:
  "Careful with That Mic...", "Red Horse Rainbow" & "Drink to the Dead" mixed by Uncle Punchy
- All songs engineered by Ben Elliott and Assisted by Henry "Earthquake" Diaz, except:
  "Careful with That Mic...", "Drink to the Dead" and "Spacegrass"
- Live portions of "Smoke Banshee", "Frankenstein" & "Brazenhead" recorded by Larry Packer at The 9:30 Club, Washington, D.C., September 2000
  F.O.H. engineer: Shawn (Gus) Vitale

Monitor engineer: Chris Sherman

- All songs mastered by Larry Packer at Uncle Punchy Studios
- Executive producers: Neil Fallon, Jean-Paul Gaster, Dan Maines, Tim Sult

== Chart positions ==
Albums

Year	Chart	Position
2001	Billboard 200	135
2001	Top Heatseekers	5

Singles

Year	Song	Chart	Position
2001	"Careful with That Mic..."	Mainstream Rock Tracks	24
