= Live at the 9:30 =

Video by Clutch
- Released: 2010

Live at the 9:30 is a live DVD by American rock band Clutch. Disc 1 is a concert DVD of the band performing their self-titled album in its entirety at the 9:30 Club in Washington, D.C., while Disc 2, Fortune Tellers Make a Killing Nowadays, is a film documenting Clutch during their tour. That's really our hometown club. We're based out of Maryland and the old 9:30 Club is where we really got our start; it's a hometown show basically.

Behind the scenes footage features appearances by: Bob Balch of Fu Manchu, Robot Lords of Tokyo, General Tso, Lionize, Shavo Odadjian of System of a Down, Duff Goldman, and J. Robbins.

The Washington Post called it an "excellent live album".

== Personnel ==
- Neil Fallon – vocals and guitar
- Tim Sult – guitars
- Jean-Paul Gaster – drums and percussion
- Dan Maines – bass
- Agent Ogden – director / producer
- Will Duderstadt – producer
