= Heard It All Before: Live at the Hi Fi Bar =

Heard It All Before: Live at the HiFi Bar

Live album by Clutch
- Released: December 13, 2007
- Recorded: December 13, 2007
- Genre: Stoner rock, hard rock, blues rock
- Length: ≈140:00
- Label: New Found Frequency
- Producer: Clutch

Heard It All Before: Live at the HiFi Bar is the third live album by rock band Clutch. The album was recorded in Melbourne, Australia, on December 13, 2007, and released immediately after the shows end to the crowd, and also online. The first four tracks of the first disc are done by The Bakerton Group, an instrumental rock band, which is a side project of all Clutch members.

== Track listing ==
=== Disc one ===
1. "1906 Part 2/Great Bakertons"
2. "Bruce Bigsby"
3. "Last Orbit"
4. "Many Gators"
5. "Small Upsetters"
6. "Profits of Doom"
7. "Never Be Moved"
8. "You Can't Stop Progress"
9. "Power Player"
10. "The Devil & Me"
11. "Slow Hole to China"
12. "The Soapmakers"
13. "Burning Beard"
14. "Child of the City"
15. "Big News I/Big News II"

=== Disc two ===
1. "Burning Hell/How Many More Years"
2. "King of Arizona"
3. "Texan Book of the Dead"
4. "The Mob Goes Wild"
5. "Mr. Shiny Cadillackness"
6. "Cypress Grove"
7. "White's Ferry"
8. "A Shogun Named Marcus"
9. "10001110101"
10. "Basket of Eggs"
11. "Promoter (of Earthbound Causes)"
12. "Mice & Gods"
13. "Black Umbrella"
14. "Electric Worry/One Eye $"
