= Transnational Speedway League: Anthems, Anecdotes and Undeniable Truths =

Studio album by Clutch
- Released: June 17, 1993
- Recorded: January 1993 at Razor's Edge Studio (San Francisco, California); April 1993 at Spa Studio Inc. (New York City, New York)
- Genre: Stoner rock; alternative metal; post-hardcore; hardcore punk
- Length: 46:16
- Label: EastWest
- Producer: Jon Burnside; Steven Haigler

Clutch chronology
| Passive Restraints (1992) | Transnational Speedway League: Anthems, Anecdotes and Undeniable Truths (1993) | Clutch (1995) |

Transnational Speedway League: Anthems, Anecdotes and Undeniable Truths (often shorted to Transnational Speedway League) is the debut studio album by American hard rock band Clutch. Recorded at Razor's Edge Studio in San Francisco, California, with producer Jonathan Burnside and at Spa Studio Inc. in New York City with producer Steven Haigler, it was released by EastWest Records on June 17, 1993. The album was promoted by a music video for opening track "A Shogun Named Marcus", directed by Dan Winters.

== Background ==
Initial recording sessions for Transnational Speedway League began in January 1993 at Razor's Edge Studio in San Francisco, California with producer Jonathan Burnside, during which the songs "Binge and Purge", "Bacchanal", "Earthworm", "Heirloom", "Walking in the Great Shining Path of Monster Trucks", and "Effigy" were recorded and mixed. After a short break, Clutch returned to the studio in April to complete the album, working with producer Steven Haigler at Spa Studio Inc. in New York City on the remaining songs, "A Shogun Named Marcus", "El Jefe Speaks", "12 Ounce Epilogue", "Milk of Human Kindness", and "Rats".

Transnational Speedway League has been described by commentators as one of the heaviest releases of Clutch's career. Metal Hammer writer Mörat described the album as "a stark reminder of just how good angry music could sound", noting its presence in a scene dominated by "the grunge explosion" which was much less heavy. According to Mörat, the opening song "A Shogun Named Marcus" had to be removed from the band's live set lists for several years "because it incited people to kick the shit out of each other". The album received a Parental Advisory sticker for the repeated use of the word "motherfucker" in the song "Binge and Purge".

The album was promoted by the release of a music video for the song "A Shogun Named Marcus", which was directed by Dan Winters who also provided photography for the album. The band toured throughout 1994 in promotion of the album, including support dates for Brazilian groove metal band Sepultura, American industrial metal band Fear Factory, and British sludge metal band Fudge Tunnel.

== Reception ==
Professional ratings
Review scores
| Source | Rating |
|---|---|
| AllMusic | 3/5 stars |
| Collector's Guide to Heavy Metal | 8/10 |
| MusicHound Rock | 4/5 stars |

Media response to Transnational Speedway League was generally positive. Jeremy Ulrey of AllMusic praised the album for its "dogged hard rocking and consistent songwriting prowess", highlighting the first half of the album over the second half but overall dubbing it "one of the brighter debuts to emerge in the '90s". In a feature published in 2016, Metal Hammer columnist Mörat ranked "Binge and Purge" on his list of "The top 10 best Clutch songs", outlining that "it doesn't get much heavier than this, the third track from Clutch's debut album", and describing the song as "quite simply, music to kill people to". In an earlier feature, in which he hailed the album as being "in a class of its own", Mörat also praised opening track "A Shogun Named Marcus", which he credited as "the moment when many a rock fan became a Clutch devotee ... the 'wow' moment".

== Track listing ==
All tracks are written by Clutch

| No. | Title | Length |
|---|---|---|
| 1. | "A Shogun Named Marcus" | 2:52 |
| 2. | "El Jefe Speaks" | 3:49 |
| 3. | "Binge and Purge" | 6:29 |
| 4. | "12 Ounce Epilogue" | 2:49 |
| 5. | "Bacchanal" | 4:11 |
| 6. | "Milk of Human Kindness" | 4:17 |
| 7. | "Rats" | 2:45 |
| 8. | "Earthworm" | 4:31 |
| 9. | "Heirloom" | 5:34 |
| 10. | "Walking in the Great Shining Path of Monster Trucks" | 3:43 |
| 11. | "Effigy" | 5:09 |
| Total length: | | 46:16 |

== Personnel ==
- Neil Fallon – vocals
- Tim Sult – guitar
- Dan Maines – bass
- Jean-Paul Gaster – drums
- Jonathan Burnside – production, engineering and mixing (tracks 3, 5 and 8–11)
- Steven Haigler – production, engineering and mixing (tracks 1, 2, 4, 6 and 7)
- Billy Anderson – additional engineering (tracks 3, 5 and 8–11)
- Peter Stabuli – additional engineering (tracks 3, 5 and 8–11)
- Louis Driben – additional engineering (tracks 3, 5 and 8–11)
- Tony Olavarria – additional engineering (tracks 1, 2, 4, 6 and 7)
- George Marino – mastering
- Frank Gargiulo – art direction, design
- Mike Baugh – logo design
- Dan Winters – photography
