= Slow Hole to China: Rare and Unreleased =

Compilation album by Clutch
- Released: 2003
- Recorded: 1991–2002
- Labels: River Road (original), Weathermaker (reissue)

Clutch chronology
Live at the Googolplex (2003)	Slow Hole to China: Rare and Unreleased (2003)	Blast Tyrant (2004)

Alternative cover
- 2009 reissue cover

Alternative cover
- 2024 reissue cover

Slow Hole to China: Rare and Unreleased is an album by American rock band Clutch, consisting of various previously unreleased recordings, released in 2003. Clutch has since released two remastered reissues of the album: on April 28, 2009, re-titled Slow Hole to China: Rare and Re-released and in 2024, simply titled Slow Hole to China.

== Album information ==
The album was released on CD by River Road Records, and 3,000 copies were printed on 12" LP by Emetic Records, with 2,000 of these regular black vinyl, while 1,000 were rare red marble vinyl.

It is an album of rare recording of songs (that have been extensively bootlegged over the years), with cover versions and some of the rare singles by the band. It also has some 'alternate' earlier versions of songs that were released on albums in a different format to what was originally recorded, something the band have done with albums such as Jam Room before. The remastered reissue has three more of such tracks added to the original.

== Track listing ==
All tracks written by Clutch, except where noted.

Slow Hole to China: Rare and Unreleased
No.	Title	Writer(s)	Length
1.	"Slow Hole to China"		3:20
2.	"Nickel Dime"		2:59
3.	"Sea of Destruction"		2:50
4.	"Oregon"		5:23
5.	"Easy Breeze"		2:40
6.	"Four Lords (And One More)"		3:04
7.	"Rising Son"		4:01
8.	"Guild of Mute Assassins"		6:42
9.	"Willie Nelson"		3:17
10.	"Equinox" (John Coltrane cover)	John Coltrane	3:55
11.	"Hoodoo Operator"		4:57
12.	"Day of the Jackalope"		3:35

Slow Hole to China: Rare and Re-released
No.	Title	Writer(s)	Length
1.	"King of Arizona" (new track)		4:09
2.	"Slow Hole to China"		3:20
3.	"Nickel Dime"		2:59
4.	"Sea of Destruction"		2:50
5.	"Oregon"		5:23
6.	"Easy Breeze"		2:40
7.	"Hale Bopp Blues" (new track)		4:31
8.	"Four Lords"		3:04
9.	"Rising Son"		4:01
10.	"Guild of Mute Assassins"		6:42
11.	"Willie Nelson"		3:17
12.	"Equinox" (John Coltrane cover)	John Coltrane	3:55
13.	"Hoodoo Operator"		4:57
14.	"Day of the Jackalope"		3:35
15.	"Ship of Gold (West Virginia)" (new track)		4:33

== Personnel ==
- Neil Fallon – vocals
- Tim Sult – guitar
- Dan Maines – bass
- Jean-Paul Gaster – drums
