= Blast Tyrant =

Studio album by Clutch
- Released: March 23, 2004; May 10, 2011 (reissue)
- Recorded: 2003
- Studio: Water Music Recorders (Hoboken, New Jersey); The Machine Shop (Hoboken, New Jersey); Jean-Paul Gaster's living room
- Genre: Stoner rock, hard rock, blues rock
- Length: 54:31
- Label: DRT, Weathermaker
- Producer: Machine and Clutch

Clutch chronology
Slow Hole to China: Rare and Unreleased (2003)	Blast Tyrant (2004)	Robot Hive/Exodus (2005)

Basket of Eggs cover

Professional ratings
Review scores
Source	Rating
AllMusic	3.5/5 stars
Blabbermouth.net	8/10
Brave Words & Bloody Knuckles	10/10
Classic Rock	4/5 stars
Cokemachineglow	80%
Consequence of Sound	3/5 stars
Gigwise	4/5 stars
Kerrang!	3/5 stars
PopMatters	(favorable)
Stylus	7/10

Blast Tyrant is the sixth full-length studio album by American rock band Clutch and was released March 23, 2004. The album was reissued on May 10, 2011. It was the first release with DRT Entertainment by the band.

== Album information ==
The unabridged title of the album is Blast Tyrant Atlas of the Invisible World with Illustrations of Strange Beasts and Phantoms.

A reissue of the album was released through Clutch's own label, Weathermaker Music, and contains the original album along with a second bonus disc, entitled Basket of Eggs, which is a collection of acoustic versions of songs, from 2001 to 2011 by the band, including the "Polar Bear Lair Demos". The music video for the song "The Mob Goes Wild" was created by Ryan Dunn. Unlike some reissues the band have done, or some of the "import" versions of their albums to begin with, the track listing of the original album remains the same.

The album debuted at #147 on the Billboard 200, selling 8,000 copies in its first week.

== Track listing ==
All songs written by Clutch.

=== Original album ===
No.	Title	Length
1.	"Mercury"	3:00
2.	"Profits of Doom"	3:12
3.	"The Mob Goes Wild"	3:32
4.	"Cypress Grove"	2:45
5.	"Promoter (of Earthbound Causes)"	3:14
6.	"The Regulator"	5:25
7.	"Worm Drink"	3:13
8.	"Army of Bono"	4:36
9.	"Spleen Merchant"	2:38
10.	"(In the Wake of) The Swollen Goat"	3:01
11.	"Weathermaker"	0:47
12.	"Subtle Hustle"	2:46
13.	"Ghost"	4:37
14.	"(Notes from the Trial of) La Curandera"	5:49
15.	"WYSIWYG" (instrumental)	5:49
Total length:		54:31

=== Basket of Eggs and other reissues ===
In 2011, Blast Tyrant was reissued with a bonus disk of 10 tracks, half being acoustic versions of past Clutch songs such as The Regulator and Tight Like That (originally appearing on Clutch's self titled album). Tracks 1–4 were recorded between September 2010 and January 2011; track 5 was live in a Milwaukee radio station in 2001; tracks 6–10 were recorded in July 2002 and are known as the "Polar Bear Lair Demos", of which 6, 7 and 10 are previously unreleased tracks by the band.

No.	Title	Length
1.	"Box Car Shorty's Confession (acoustic)"	2:59
2.	"The Regulator (acoustic)"	5:30
3.	"Basket of Eggs (acoustic)"	3:43
4.	"Tight Like That (acoustic)"	4:55
5.	"Drink to the Dead (live acoustic)"	4:28
6.	"Cattle Car"	2:58
7.	"Walpole Man"	4:22
8.	"Promoter"	3:06
9.	"La Curandera"	4:06
10.	"Steve Doocy"	4:04
Total length:		38:11

On July 9th, 2021, Clutch reissued Blast Tyrant as the first installment in their Clutch Collector's Series. This new reissue did not include the bonus Basket Of Eggs disk. However, the reissue included the acoustic version of "The Regulator", as well as two colored 180-gram disks (one orange, one blue), a band-signed insert, new cover art, as well as a limited edition 25 oz. etched glass stein and a t-shirt with a metallic silver ink of album artwork if you were among the first 1000 to pre-order the album on Clutch's website.

== Personnel ==
- Neil Fallon – vocals, rhythm guitar, organ
- Tim Sult – lead guitar
- Dan Maines – bass
- Jean-Paul Gaster – drums

=== Production ===
- Produced by Clutch and Machine
- Recorded and mixed by Machine
- Drums were recorded at Water Music, Hoboken, New Jersey
- Pro-Tools by Nick Rowe and assisted by Ted Young
- Guitars and vocals were recorded at The Machine Shop, Hoboken, New Jersey
- Additional production of vocals and guitars recorded in Jean-Paul Gaster's living room
- Mixed at the Machine Shop, Hoboken, New Jersey
- Mastered by Ue Nastasi at Sterling Sound
- Artwork by Encarnacion Hernandez

== Chart performance ==
Album - Billboard (United States)

Year	Chart	Position
2004	Billboard 200	#147
2004	Top Heatseekers	#4
2004	Top Independent Albums	#9

Singles - Billboard (United States)

Year	Song	Chart	Position
2004	"The Mob Goes Wild"	Mainstream Rock Tracks	#39
