= The Bakerton Group =

American rock band

- Origin: Lewistown, Maryland, U.S.
- Genres: Blues rock; psychedelic rock; jam band; stoner rock
- Years active: 1999–present
- Labels: River Road; Emetic; Weathermaker Music
- Spinoff of: Clutch
- Members: Tim Sult; Dan Maines; Jean-Paul Gaster; Neil Fallon
- Past members: Mick Schauer

The Bakerton Group is an instrumental blues jam band and the side project of the blues rock band Clutch. They incorporate elements of blues rock, psychedelic rock, and jazz.

== Biography ==
The band is currently composed of all four members of the rock band Clutch (Tim Sult, Dan Maines, Jean-Paul Gaster, Neil Fallon) and has toured extensively throughout Canada and the United States. Taking a sidestep from the traditional Clutch sound, The Bakerton Group focuses on the instrumental talents of its members with songs of a psychedelic, groovy, "jazz-infected" feel.

The band's first release came in 2001 with the three-track EP Space Guitars, made available as a free download on the official Clutch website.

In August 2006, the band began recording new material for their first full-length release at the Magpie Cage in Baltimore. J. Robbins of Jawbox fame produced the album, which incorporated a new member, Mick Schauer, to play the Hammond organ. In October 2007, over a year after recording began, the eponymous album was released.

On February 17, 2009, The Bakerton Group released El Rojo. Also produced by Robbins, it is the band's first release on the Weathermaker Music label. After Schauer left the group in 2007, Per Wiberg of Opeth served as replacement on keyboards, organ, and synthesizers.

== Discography ==
Year	Title	Label
2001	Space Guitars EP	River Road Records
2007	The Bakerton Group	Emetic Records
2009	El Rojo	Weathermaker Music

== Members ==
- Tim Sult – guitar
- Dan Maines – bass guitar
- Jean-Paul Gaster – drums
- Neil Fallon – guitar

=== Former members ===
- Mick Schauer - organ (died 2019)
