= Clutch (band) =

American rock band

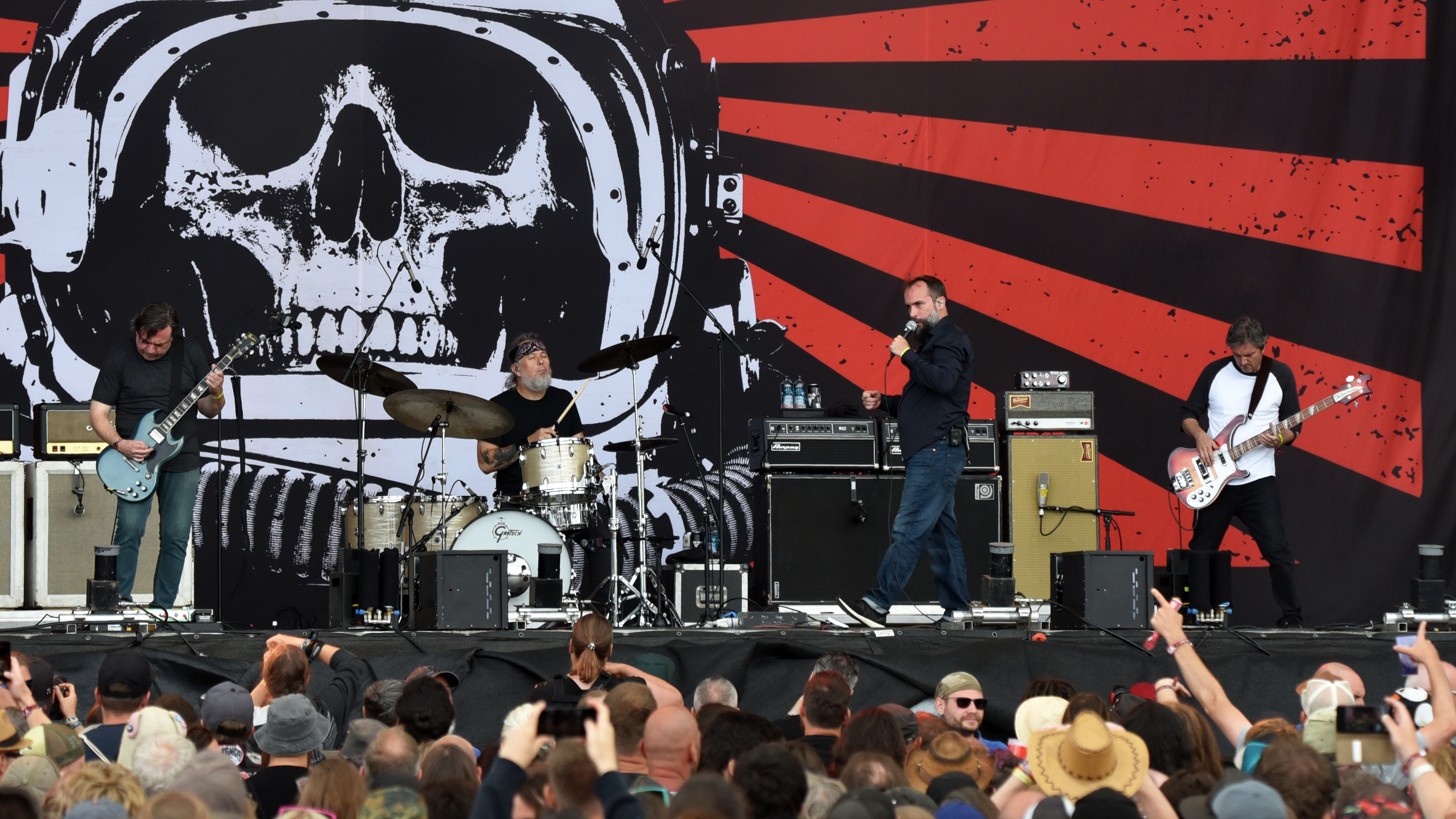
- Clutch performing in 2022

Background information
- Origin: Germantown, Maryland, U.S.
- Genres: Hard rock; stoner rock; blues rock; alternative metal
- Years active: 1991–present
- Labels: Atlantic; Columbia; DRT; Earache; Eastwest; Inner Journey; Megaforce; River Road; Weathermaker
- Spinoffs: The Bakerton Group
- Members: Tim Sult; Dan Maines; Jean-Paul Gaster; Neil Fallon
- Past members: Mick Schauer; Roger Smalls
- Website: clutchmerch.com

Clutch is an American rock band from Germantown, Maryland. Since its formation in 1991, the band lineup has included Tim Sult (lead guitar), Dan Maines (bass), Jean-Paul Gaster (drums), and Neil Fallon (vocals, rhythm guitar, keyboards). To date, Clutch has released thirteen studio albums, and several rarities and live albums. Since 2008, the band has been signed to their own record label, Weathermaker Music. Clutch is one of the pioneers of stoner rock.

== History ==
=== Early years and breakthrough: 1991–2003 ===
Clutch was formed in 1991 by bassist Dan Maines, drummer Jean-Paul Gaster, lead guitarist Tim Sult, and lead vocalist Roger Smalls in Germantown, Maryland. Before settling on the name Clutch, the band used the early names Glut Trip and Moral Minority. Smalls soon departed and was replaced by Neil Fallon, a longtime schoolmate of the other members at Seneca Valley High School. The band's name was chosen due to the band's interest in cars at the time, and it being a one-syllable name like many bands at the time, including Prong, who the band were fans of.

The band quickly gained notice through constant touring. The 12" single Passive Restraints on the Earache label was Clutch's first commercial release, garnering attention from other labels. Their debut LP, Transnational Speedway League, was released through EastWest Records in 1993. It was followed by a self-titled album in May 1995 that gained Clutch mainstream exposure. However, shortly after its release, the band's A&R rep was fired from EastWest, resulting in all of the rep's acts, including Clutch, being dropped. The band moved to the larger Columbia label for the 1998 album The Elephant Riders. They followed it in 1999 with a self-released groove-based album Jam Room.

The album Pure Rock Fury was released by Atlantic Records in 2001. The title track was initially released as the first single. The program director for North Carolina rock station WXQR (Rock 105), Brian Rickman, suggested that the label switch singles to another track from the album, "Careful with That Mic". Atlantic did so, and Clutch achieved a surprise hit single. The follow-up tracks, "Immortal" and "Open Up the Border", were also well received by American rock stations. In 2003 they issued Live at the Googolplex and the rarities record Slow Hole to China.

=== Commercial and critical success: 2004–2011 ===
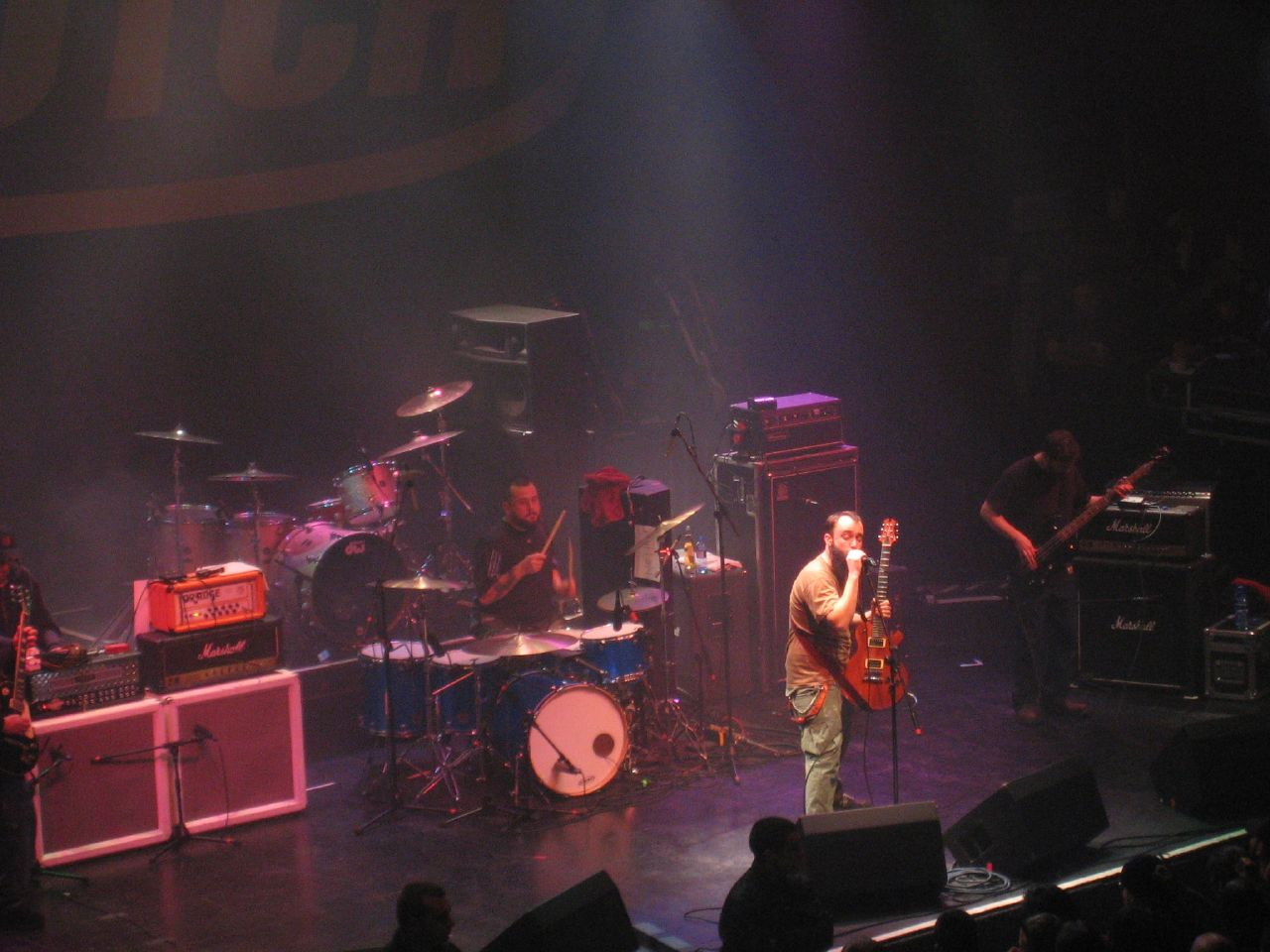
Clutch in 2006

The album Blast Tyrant was released in 2004, their first for DRT Entertainment. The band once again enjoyed more rock radio airplay and heavy rotation on the Music Choice cable service thanks to the single "The Mob Goes Wild". Its accompanying video was directed by Bam Margera and featured Margera's Viva La Bam co-stars Ryan Dunn, Brandon DiCamillo, and Don Vito. The video was filmed at Rex's in West Chester, Pennsylvania. The 2005 release Pitchfork & Lost Needles combined Clutch's 1991 Pitchfork 7-inch release with previously unreleased demos and early tracks. In 2005 the band saw their first lineup change since the early 1990s with the addition of organist Mick Schauer, who performed on the albums Robot Hive/Exodus (2005) and From Beale Street to Oblivion (2007). The later album was produced by Joe Barresi who has also produced for Kyuss, Melvins, Queens of the Stone Age, and Tool.

The band's first live DVD, Full Fathom Five, and accompanying CD, produced and directed by Agent Ogden, were released in September 2008. The band also released a remastered version of Slow Hole to China: Rare and Unreleased on April 28, 2009. The band's ninth studio album Strange Cousins from the West, was released on July 14, 2009. Songs from the album were played live on tour prior to the album's recording. A two-disc DVD set Clutch Live at the 9:30 was released on May 11, 2010, by the band's own label, Weathermaker Music. The set includes the entire December 28, 2009, show at Washington, D.C.'s 9:30 club, in which the band performed its entire 1995 self-titled LP.

On May 10, 2011, Clutch reissued their 2004 album Blast Tyrant on Weathermaker Music. The new edition contained a bonus album known as Basket of Eggs that includes unreleased songs as well as acoustic versions of previous hits. In its first week of release Blast Tyrant sold close to three thousand copies nationally, landing it at No. 26 on the Billboard Hard Rock Top 100, more than seven years after the original version debuted at No. 15.

=== Recent releases: 2012–present ===
On June 10, 2012, the band released a new single, "Pigtown Blues", backed with an acoustic version of "Motherless Child" from Strange Cousins from the West.

On March 16, 2013, Clutch released their tenth album Earth Rocker which entered the Billboard Top 200 chart at No. 15 giving Clutch their highest chart position to date. It remained on the chart for a total of five weeks. The album also reached No. 4 on iTunes' overall Top 100 album charts and was No. 1 on their rock chart. Earthrocker won Album of the Year 2013 from British publication Metalhammer, and was rated highly on many rock and metal magazines' and websites' end-of-the-year "top-tens".

In an interview on January 7, 2015, with music and entertainment company 88 Miles West, Fallon stated that the band was heading to Dripping Springs, Texas, to record their upcoming eleventh album. Fallon states the venture to Texas was due to the relocation of record producer Machine, with whom they worked on Blast Tyrant and Earth Rocker, and who recently opened a new studio there. He stated in the interview that "Septemberish, give or take a couple of months" is when they hope to release the new album.

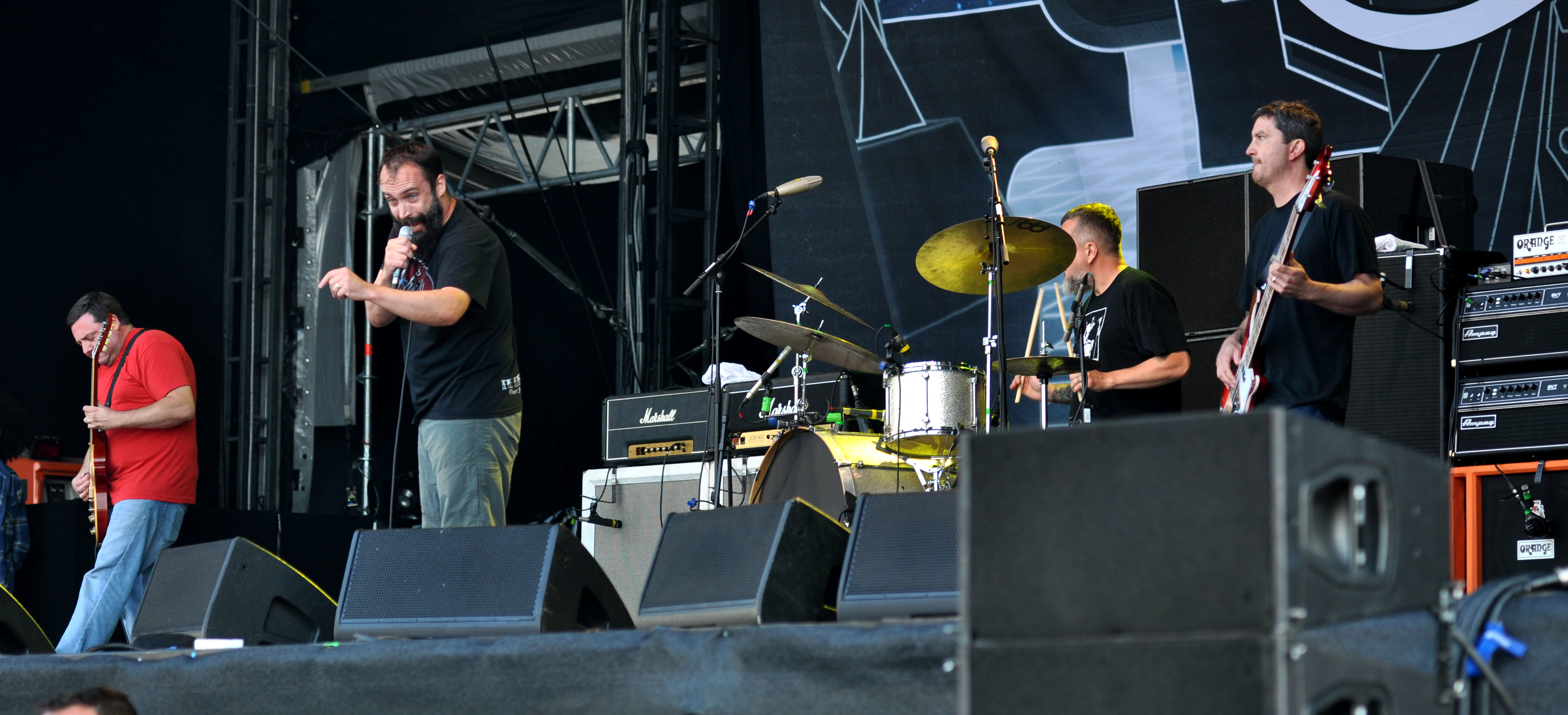
Clutch performing in 2013

Their eleventh studio album, Psychic Warfare, was released October 2, 2015. Fallon said the concept is influenced by science fiction author Philip K. Dick. "His general philosophy and questions have always crept into my lyrics, because I share an interest in it", he added. "On Earth Rocker, 'Crucial Velocity' was definitely a Philip Dick song for me. On this record, 'X-Ray Visions' certainly is." Gaster described the new material as more diverse than ever.

In April 2018, Neil Fallon announced through the radio station The Eagle Rocks that the band's twelfth studio album would be titled Book of Bad Decisions. The album was released on September 7, 2018. The album was recorded at Sputnik Sound Studio in Nashville, Tennessee, with producer and engineer Vance Powell.

Former keyboardist, Mick Schauer died of cancer on September 15, 2019, at age 46.

In an August 2020 interview on the Detroit-based radio station WRIF, drummer Jean-Paul Gaster stated that Clutch would "probably" begin recording their thirteenth studio album in the winter. In an interview with Metal Kaoz in April 2021, Gaster offered an update on the new album, saying: "Over the last year, we've written a lot of songs for our new album, and we've done some streaming shows too, which was something we knew nothing about prior to the pandemic. But we educated ourselves quickly, and that kept us busy for a lot of last year as well. We've been writing now for our new album that we will record in the fall, and I think we're spending more time than ever in the studio, just trying out different ideas. And most of the ideas don't ever really make it to the end; we try 10 things and we keep one." Gaster also stated that their new album would likely not be released until early 2022. The resulting album, Sunrise on Slaughter Beach, was released on September 16, 2022.

On July 9, 2021, Clutch began a series of reissues known as the Clutch Collector's Series in which each member picks a Clutch album and reimagines it. So far, the series only has two instalments: a new reissue of 2004's Blast Tyrant, released on July 9, curated by drummer Jean-Paul Gaster, and 2005's Robot Hive/Exodus, curated by bassist Dan Maines.

As of April 2024, Clutch has begun writing new material for their fourteenth studio album.

In August of 2024, Clutch rereleased their compilation album Slow Hole To China.

In October 2024, Fallon discussed the progress on the band's fourteenth album saying "we don't wanna just put out a record for the sake of putting out a record. We wanna put out an awesome record, and if that takes longer than, let's say, usual, then so be it." In April 2025, Fallon gave an update on the album saying “Yeah, we’re writing now. It’s taken longer than I think we would’ve liked to have, but to be honest, we toured a lot in the past three years, like really grounded down. When you come home from tour, you don’t wanna turn around the next day and say, ‘Let’s get together and write a song.’ Gotta take a bit of a break.” Clutch announced that their 2025 "Full Ahead Flank MMXXV Tour" will begin in North America in June with dates running until October and it will be followed with dates outside of North America from November to December. In May 2025, Fallon confirmed that pre-production on the band's fourteenth album has begun with producer Gene Freeman. In December 2025 Clutch announced a 2026 tour that would begin in April and Fallon gave an update on the band's next album saying "There will be another writing session in January, and the plan is to record in late January or early February. Nowadays, from finishing a record to mastering takes up to six months.There are a number of songs in the can, but I'm not going to predict when it might be released."

On August 28, 2026, the band released the song "The Drifter Returns" which is expected to appear on their next album. It marked the first new music to be released by the band since 2022.The band's fourteenth album, Wasted Lands, will be released on January 22, 2027. The band released the album's title track as the second single (along with a music video) on September 25, 2026.

== Other projects ==
In the late 1990s, Clutch and its sibling project The Bakerton Group (an instrumental jam band composed of all four Clutch members) formed an independent record label, River Road Records, to release their own music. River Road does not sign any other artists. The Bakerton Group has released one three-track EP titled Space Guitars and two full-length albums titled The Bakerton Group and El Rojo respectively. Clutch/Bakerton Group now runs its own independent record label for its own releases, Weathermaker Music.

The Company Band was started in 2007 by Neil Fallon, James A. Rota (Fireball Ministry), Brad Davis (Fu Manchu), Jess Margera (CKY) and Dave Bone. Initially, the bass was played by Jason Diamond (Puny Human).

Dunsmuir is a project featuring Neil Fallon, Dave Bone, Brad Davis and Vinny Appice. They released a self-titled album in 2016.

== Musical style ==
Clutch have been described as "hard rockers who blended elements of funk, Led Zeppelin, and metal with vocals inspired by Faith No More."

== Band members ==
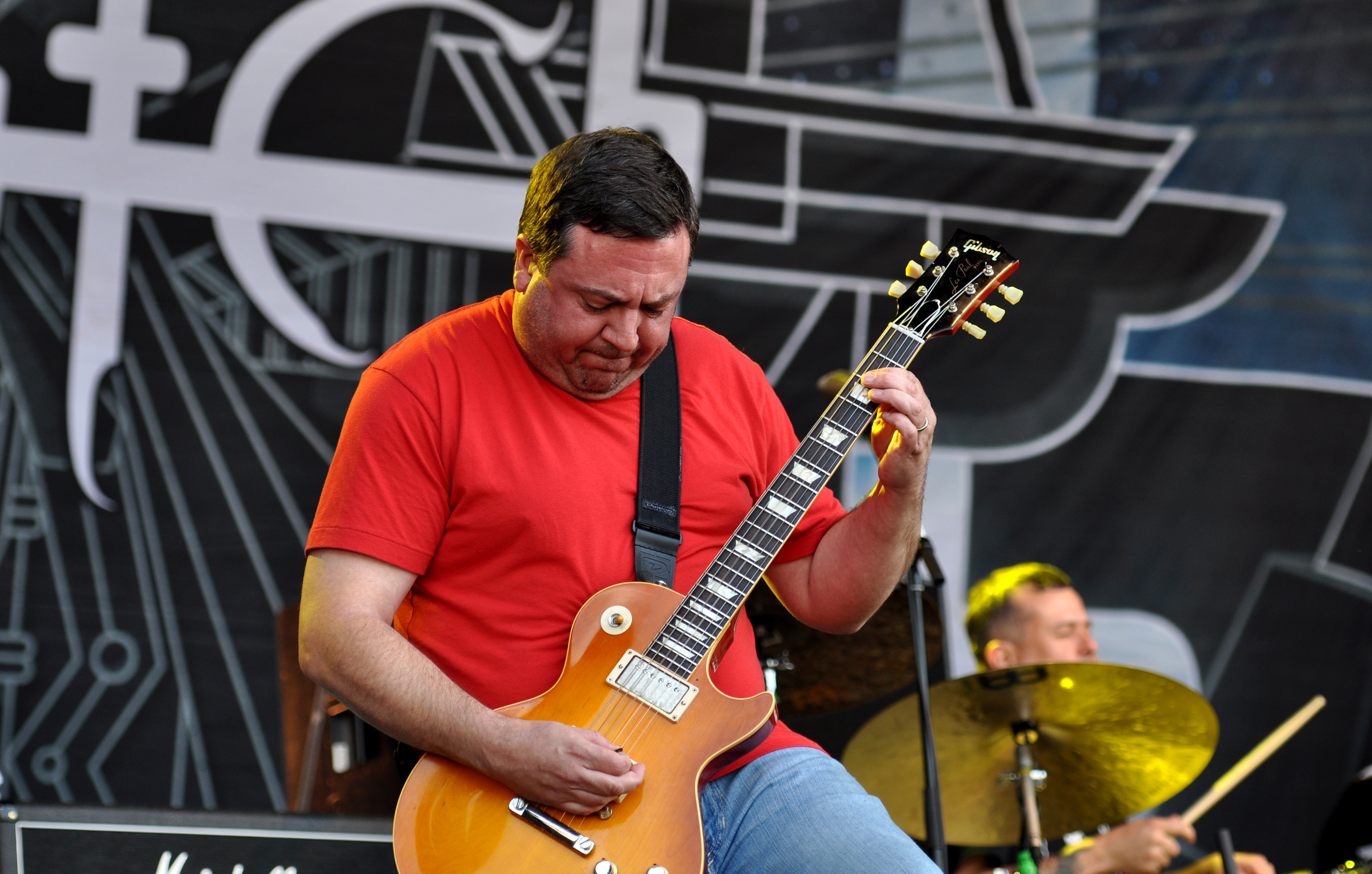
Tim Sult

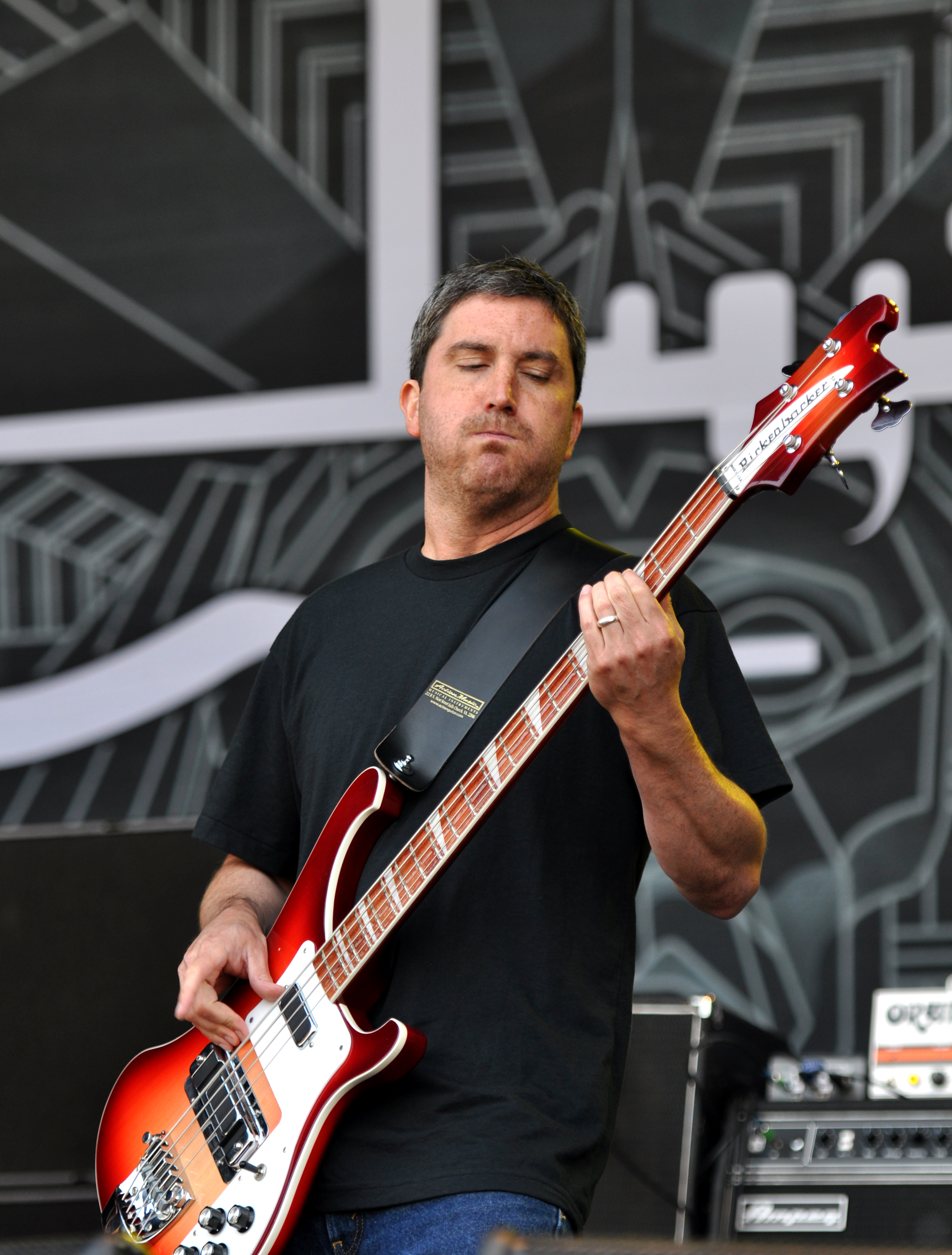
Dan Maines

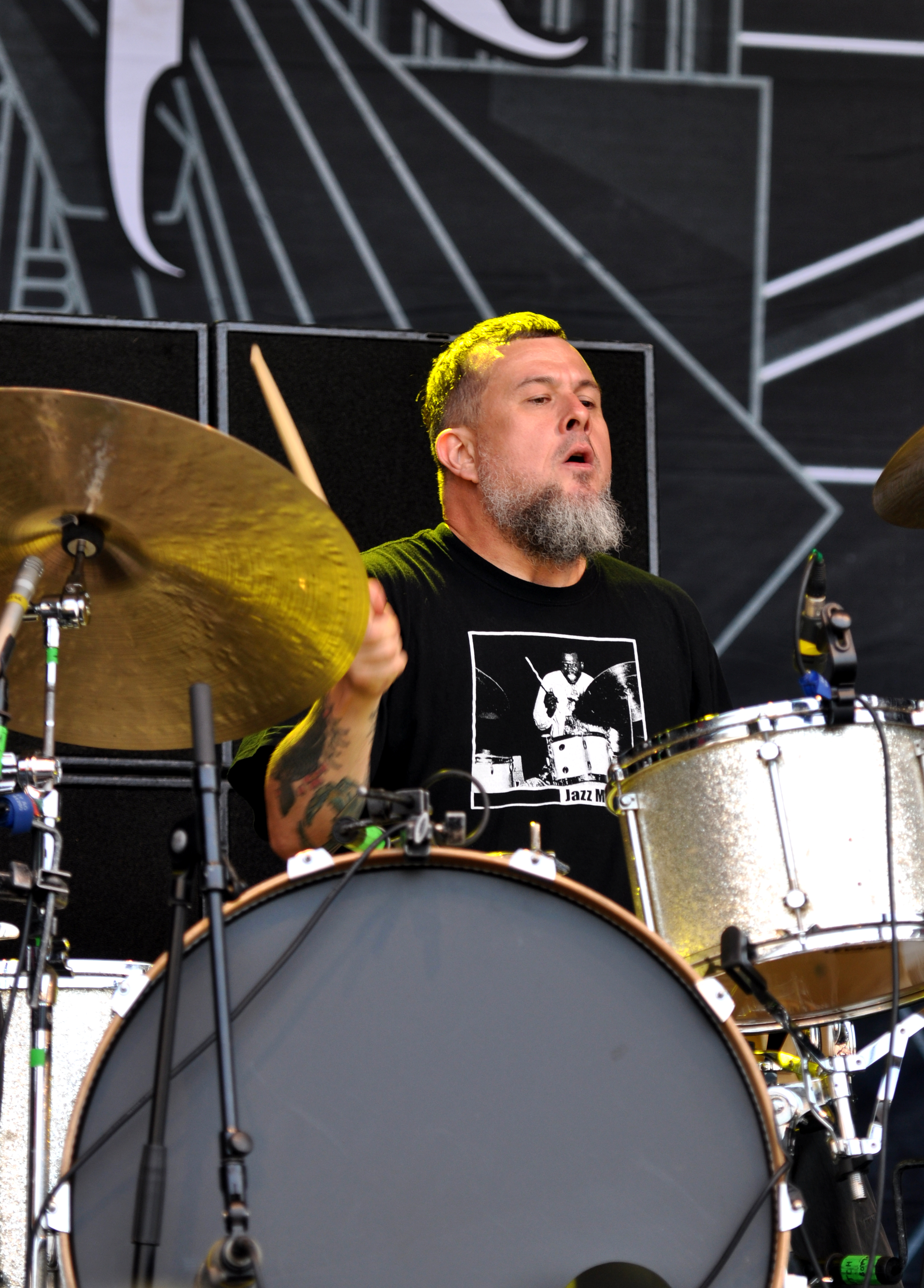
Jean-Paul Gaster

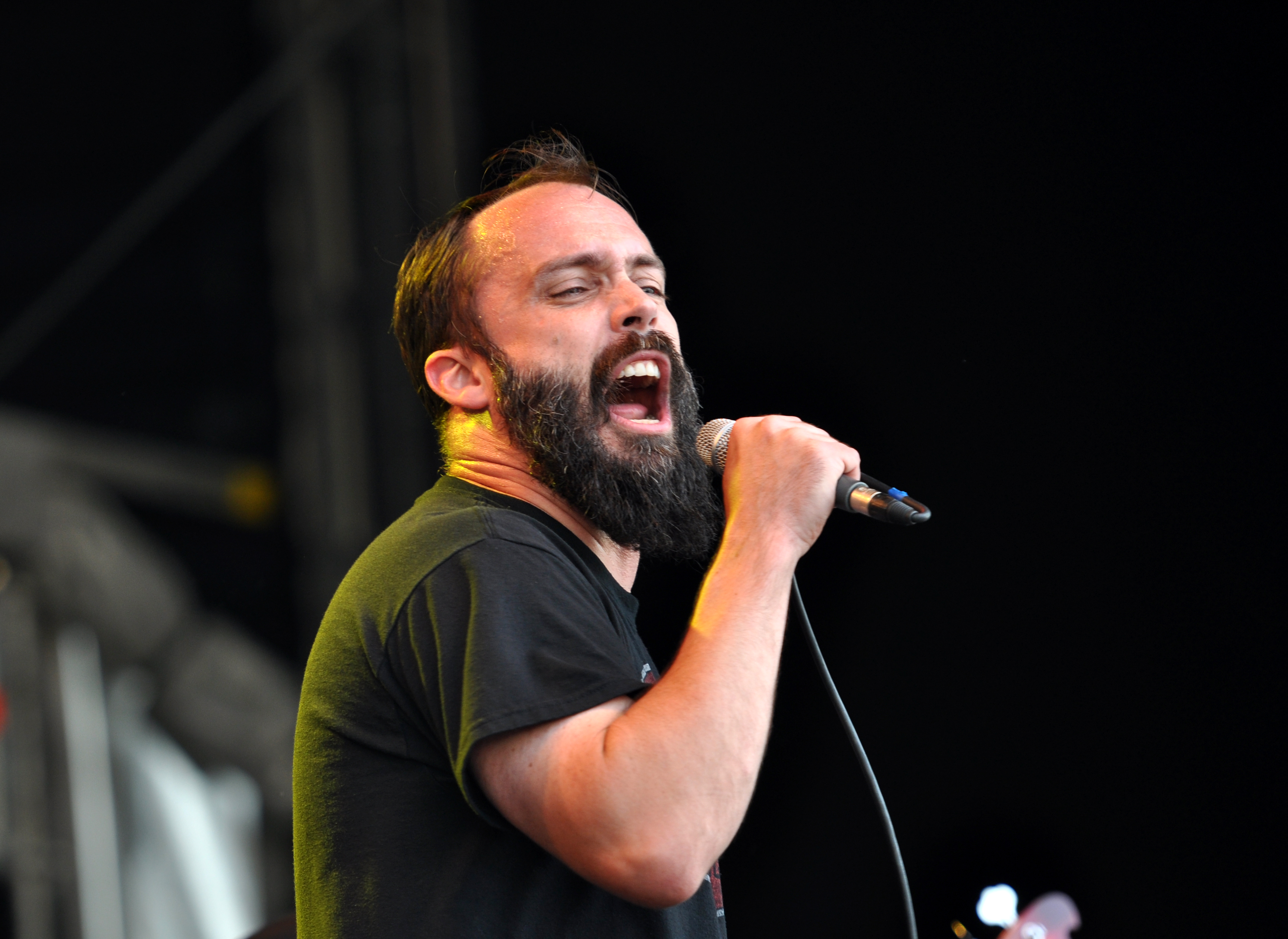
Neil Fallon

Current

- Tim Sult – lead guitar (1991–present)
- Dan Maines – bass (1991–present)
- Jean-Paul Gaster – drums, percussion (1991–present)
- Neil Fallon – vocals, rhythm guitar, occasional harmonica, occasional keyboards (1991–present)

Former

- Roger Smalls – vocals (1991)
- Mick Schauer – keyboards (2005–2008; died 2019)

== Discography ==
Studio albums

- Transnational Speedway League (1993)
- Clutch (1995)
- The Elephant Riders (1998)
- Jam Room (1999)
- Pure Rock Fury (2001)
- Blast Tyrant (2004)
- Robot Hive/Exodus (2005)
- From Beale Street to Oblivion (2007)
- Strange Cousins from the West (2009)
- Earth Rocker (2013)
- Psychic Warfare (2015)
- Book of Bad Decisions (2018)
- Sunrise on Slaughter Beach (2022)
- Wasted Lands (2027)

== Weathermaker Music ==
Weathermaker Music
- Founded: 2008
- Distributor: The Orchard
- Genre: Rock
- Country of origin: United States
- Official website: weathermakermusic.com

Weathermaker Music is the record label owned by the American rock band Clutch and their manager Jack Flanagan. Formed in June 2008, Weathermaker Music was mostly known to work with Clutch and their side project, the psychedelic jazz-rock alter ego The Bakerton Group.

In 2012, Weathermaker signed and released product by The Company Band and The Mob. Both groups include Weathermaker Music principal owners. On March 19, 2013, Weathermaker Music released the Clutch record "Earth Rocker" on CD and vinyl. At the end of 2013 Weathermaker Music released "Earth Rocker Live" which is a double 12 inch vinyl picture disc version of the "Earth Rocker" studio release on one LP, and the same track listing recorded live from various cities on their 2013 US tour on the second LP. In 2013 Weathermaker Music signed Deep Swell, featuring Clutch member Tim Sult on guitar. Their record, "Lore of the Angler" was released October 15, 2013. Weathermaker Music signed the Maryland-based group Lionize in 2013 as well. Entitled "Jetpack Soundtrack", this Lionize record was released on February 18, 2014, in North America, April 11, 2014, in Europe, and February 14, 2014, in the UK. The Lionize signing marks the label's first signing of an independent artist to Weathermaker Music.

In the summer of 2014, Weathermaker Music completed the Earth Rocker release cycle with a very special Double Vinyl 12" Picture Disc for collectors and released "Earth Rocker Deluxe", a 2xCD / DVD set. CD1 of the deluxe version features the original studio recordings with two previously unreleased songs, CD2 is a live version of all ER songs recorded at various stops on the Earth Rocker World Tour during the summer of 2013 and the DVD is a recording of Clutch's Denver, CO show from (11/14/13). As a bonus, the DVD contains three promotional videos, two of which were directed by Aisha Tyler.

Clutch released their 11th studio record, Psychic Warfare, on October 2, 2015, via Weathermaker Music. The first video from the album was "X-Ray Visions", Directed by Dan Winters. The album reached No. 11 on the Top 100 Billboard chart and No. 1 on both the Hard Rock and Rock Billboard charts. The second video from "Psychic Warfare" was "A Quick Death in Texas", directed and shot by My Good Eye ( David Brodsky/ Allison Woest). Clutch also participated in "10 Bands 1 Cause" breast cancer awareness program with a limited edition pink vinyl offering released September 18, 2015 distributed via RED. This vinyl will be reissued by Weathermaker Music on black vinyl on October 7, 2016.

On April 16, 2016, Weathermaker Music will release a Clutch special limited edition 12" vinyl release for Record Store Day. The album will contain two previously unreleased tracks from the Psychic Warfare sessions: "Mad Sidewinder" and "Outland Special Clearance". These two tracks, specifically mastered for this vinyl configuration by Paul Logus, will be on side A. The reverse side will have a large scale etching taken from the Psychic Warfare CD booklet design created by Dan Winters. The jacket is hand-numbered, thick, clear plastic showing the full art design, thus making this piece for Record Store Day 2016 a unique collector's item for all Clutch fans.

On September 7, 2018, WeatherMaker Music released the 12th Clutch album, Book of Bad Decisions. The album charted No. 1 on the Billboard Hard Rock Charts and came in at No. 16 on the Billboard top 200.

In early 2019, Weathermaker Music will release a complete box set of the full Clutch catalogue on vinyl.

Weathermaker Music has signed distribution agreements with The Orchard in North America, as well as international distribution agreements with Rough Trade Distribution in Europe, including the UK, and Rocket Distribution in Australia.

Weathermaker Music label manager is Stefan Koster.
