= Jean-Paul Gaster =

American drummer

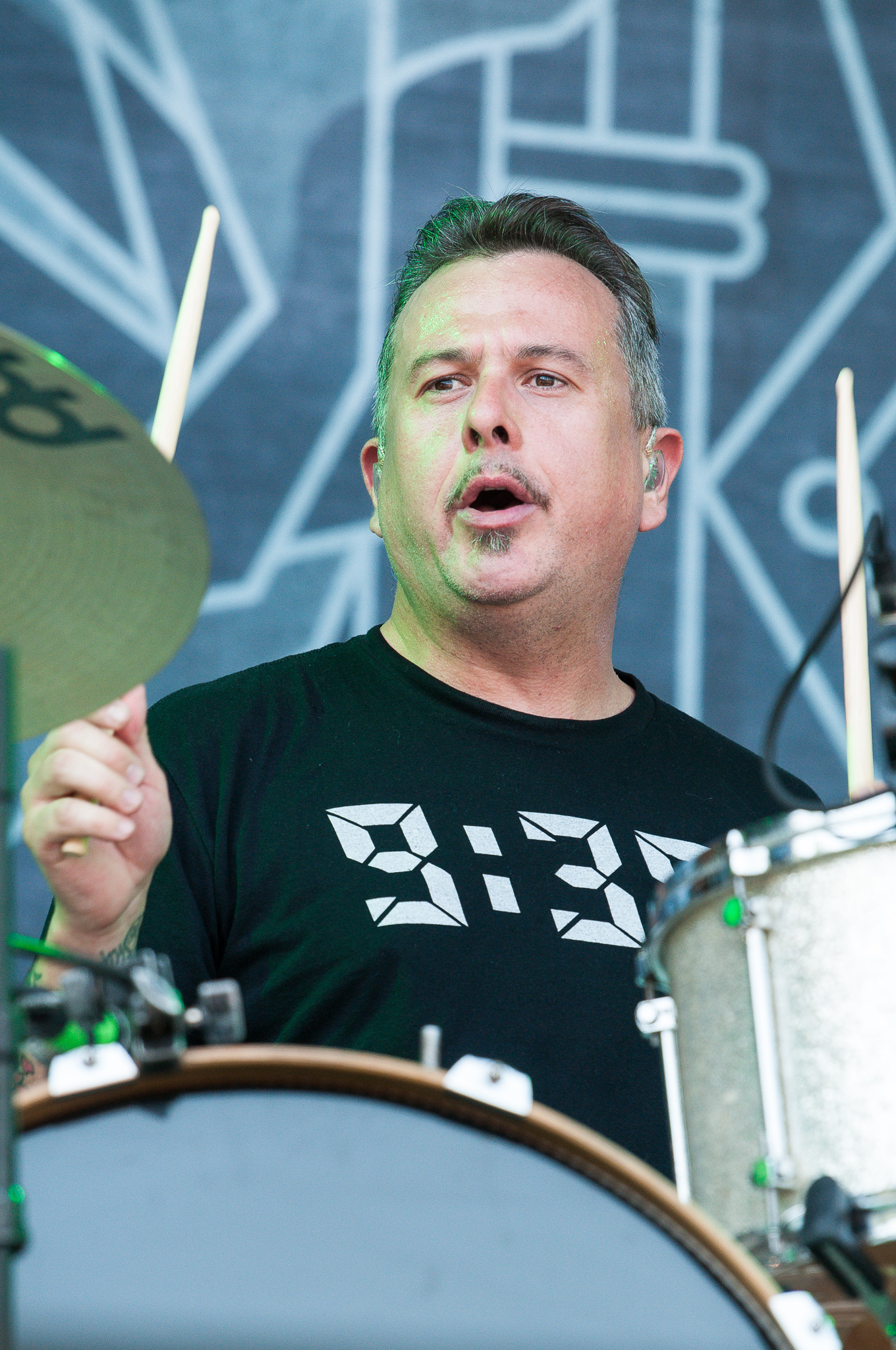
- Gaster performing with Clutch in 2015

Background information
- Born: June 19, 1971 (age 53)
- Origin: Frederick, Maryland, U.S.
- Genres: Hard rock; stoner rock; blues rock
- Occupation: Drummer
- Years active: 1990–present
- Member of: Clutch; The Bakerton Group; King Hobo; Wino
- Formerly of: Kamchatka

Jean-Paul Gaster (born June 19, 1971) is an American musician who is the drummer for the rock band Clutch.

== Style and influences ==
Gaster learned to play drums by playing along to 1960s and 1970s heavy rock bands like Jimi Hendrix, Cream, ZZ Top and Black Sabbath. Washington, D.C.'s Go-go music and in particular drummers such as Ju Ju House, Brandon Finley and Ricky Wellman were early influences as well. He is one of many students who studied with legendary Washington, D.C., drummer and educator Walter Salb. Some favorite drummers of Gaster are jazz drummers Elvin Jones and Jack DeJohnette, Bad Brains drummer Earl Hudson and New Orleans drummer Johnny Vidacovich.

== Career ==
=== Clutch ===
Gaster, Neil Fallon, Dan Maines and Tim Sult formed Clutch in 1991. After releasing the Pitchfork 7" the band embarked on its first U.S tour in the summer of 1992. Since then the band has released 13 studio albums and toured extensively through North America, Europe, UK and Australia. The band continues to be an important fixture on today's hard rock scene. Clutch plays an average of 120 shows a year and its most recent release Sunrise on Slaughter Beach went number Three on billboards rock chart. The band is currently on tour.

=== Other projects ===
In the late 1990s, Clutch formed the instrumental project The Bakerton Group. The Bakerton Group formed an independent record label, River Road Records, to release their own music. River Road Records would lay the ground work for what would become the Weathermaker music label. The Bakerton Group's El Rojo would be one of Weathermaker's first releases.

Gaster has played and recorded with the rock band Five Horse Johnson. He appears on the albums The Mystery Spot and The taking of Blackheart.

In 2007, Gaster collaborated with ex-Opeth keyboardist Per Wiberg and Kamchatka guitarist Thomas Andersson on a project called King Hobo.

During 2008, Gaster played drums on Maryland doom legend guitarist Scott Weinrich's solo album, Punctuated Equilibrium.

Gaster played on Mike Westcott's powerful blues rock album Justice Road in 2012 as well as his album Atomic Blues in 2017. He plays with Mike Westcott on a regular basis.

In 2013, Gaster provided pre-production on Lionize's Jetpack Soundtrack. He also co-produced Lionize's 2017 album Nuclear Soul & played drums on their record Panic Attack in 2019.

In 2014, Gaster recorded drums on Maryland guitarist Mark Stanley's Dark Brain album. The album also features guitarist Oz Noy as well as Spyro Gyra bassist Scott Ambush. Dark Brain is a mix of prog, jazz funk and ambient styles. He continues to collaborate with Stanley in the studio as well as live appearances.

Gaster played on Jay Turner's Art Music for Bass. "Jay's record was a challenge for me. It's the closest to a straight up jazz recording I've been involved with. The musicians he put together for those dates were amazing. I'm very proud of that one. I look forward to hitting the studio with Jay again soon"

Gaster collaborated with Kevin Hillard to record drums and percussion for the soundtrack to the movie Fishing Without Nets. The film won an award at the 2014 Sundance film festival.

Gaster recorded drums and percussion for Agent Ogden's movie When the Man Went South.

Gaster collaborates with Mark Morton of Lamb of God, Yanni Papadopoulos of Stinking Lizaveta and Chris Brooks of Lionize.

== Gear ==
Gaster's choice of set up has not changed much since the early days of Clutch. The set up usually consists of 14x26 bass drum, 9x13 tom tom, 16x16 floor tom and 5.5 x 14 chrome over brass snare drums. Favorite drum manufacturers of Gaster's include G.M.S, Slingerland, Gretsch and Ludwig. Gaster enjoys playing both vintage and new drums. Gaster states " I have a collection of vintage snares that I like to use in the studio. Old drums have a resonance that can add lots of character to the sound of a recording. My collection of drums are not museum pieces. If a throw off is in need of repair I'll fix it or replace it. These drums are meant to be played not sit on a shelf for display."

Gaster has been a Meinl endorser since 2002. Gaster plays a variety of models from Meinl's Byzance line. Some favorites are 23" and 24" medium and heavy rides. 20" and 22" Sand rides, 22" Spectrum ride, 14" and 15" vintage pure hi hats. Gaster does not play any "china" type cymbals. He states, "I find china cymbals to be awful and obnoxious sounding. I haven't used one since 1996. I saw Billy Cobham play one at Blues Alley once and he made it sound great. The one Brann Dailor plays sounds pretty good too. I just can't get a sound out of one."

Gaster is an Evans drum head endorser. He plays coated G2s on snare and tom toms. Resonant tom tom heads are clear G1s and resonant snare heads are hazy 300s. Bass drum batter heads are usually frosted EQ3.

Gaster's drums are not dampened or muffled. Sometimes a small pillow or towel is inside the bass drum on which a shure sm91 microphone rests to capture the batter side of the drum. Tuning is generally open and resonant. "Lately I've been tuning the resonant side of my tom toms about a half step higher than the batter side. That tuning approach seems to make the toms punch thru the band a little more. Right now I'm playing a Gretsch USA custom kit. Those drums seem respond very nicely to this approach".

Gaster plays Vater's West Side model drumsticks.
