= Neil Fallon =

American singer

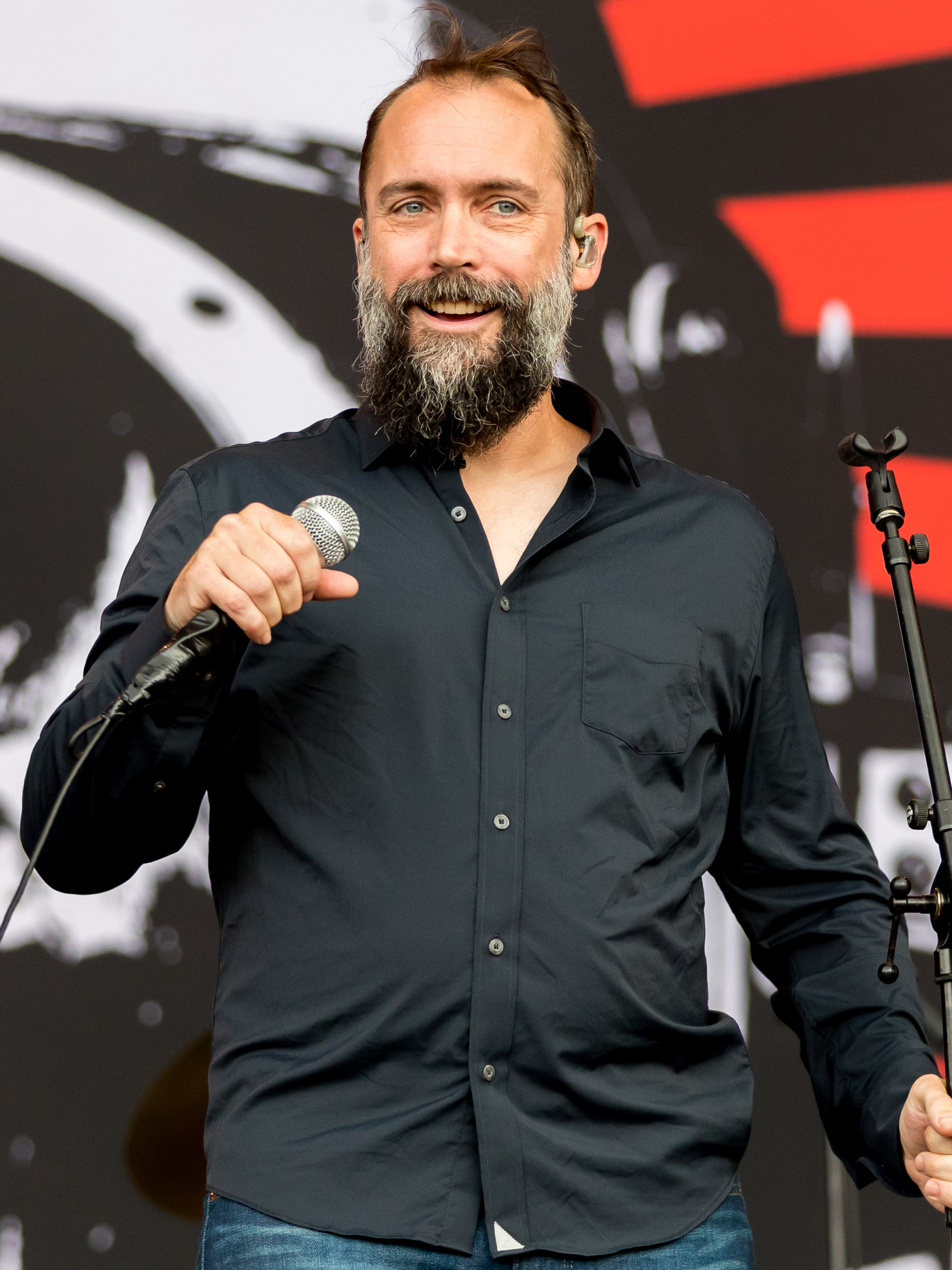
- Fallon performing with Clutch in 2022

Background information
- Born: October 25, 1971 (age 54); Portsmouth, Virginia, U.S.
- Genres: Hard rock; stoner rock; blues rock; heavy metal
- Occupations: Singer; musician; songwriter
- Instruments: Vocals; guitar
- Years active: 1990–present
- Member of: Clutch; The Company Band; The Bakerton Group; Dunsmuir

Neil Fallon (born October 25, 1971) is an American musician, best known as the lead singer and rhythm guitarist for the rock band Clutch. He is also the lead singer for The Company Band and Dunsmuir, and joined The Bakerton Group on guitar starting with their El Rojo album.

Fallon has provided guest vocals on the songs "Two Coins for Eyes" and "Empire's End" on the 2008 album Beyond Colossal by Swedish stoner rock band Dozer; "Crazy Horses" by Throat; "Slippin' Out" by Never Got Caught; "Mummies Wrapped in Money" by Lionize; and "Blood and Thunder" by Mastodon, on their 2004 album Leviathan; "Transistors of Mercy" by Polkadot Cadaver, on their 2013 album Last Call in Jonestown; "Ayatollah of Rock 'n' Rolla" by Soulfly, on their 2013 album Savages; “Crowned by the Light of the Sun” by Teenage Time Killers and appears on the song "Die to Live" on Volbeat's 2019 studio album Rewind, Replay, Rebound.

Fallon's younger sister Mary Alice Fallon-Yeskey appears on the Food Network show Ace of Cakes as office manager of Charm City Cakes in Baltimore, Maryland.

In September 2013, Fallon announced that Clutch would have to postpone their September tour (except for a hometown show in Baltimore, Maryland at the Shindig Festival), due to personal health issues. Fallon released a statement through the band's Facebook page saying "Dear friends, this week I've learned that a childhood injury to the neck, a genetic predisposition for spinal disease, and 20 some years of head banging will exact a toll. I've been diagnosed with an ugly case of cervical spinal stenosis and two herniated discs." Fallon had surgery on September 17, 2013 and the band resumed their tour in October. This ordeal inspired Fallon's lyrics in "Decapitation Blues", a track on Clutch's eleventh studio album, Psychic Warfare.

== Personal life ==
Fallon has a degree in English literature, as he graduated from the University of Maryland with a B.A. in English in 1993. He lives in Silver Spring, Maryland with his family.
