= Tim Sult =

American guitarist

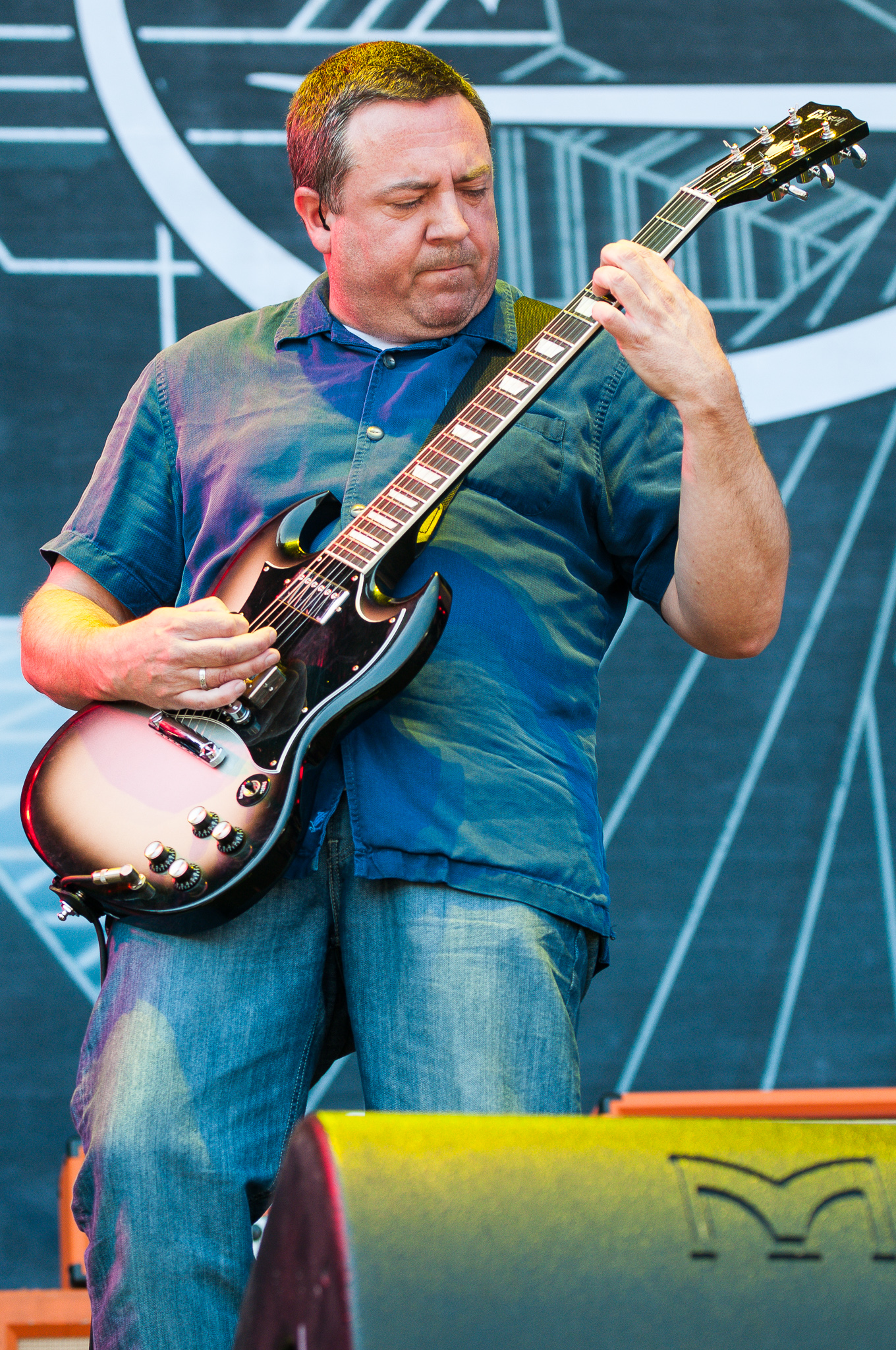
- Sult performing with Clutch in 2015

Background information
- Genres: Hard rock, stoner rock, blues rock
- Occupation: Guitarist
- Years active: 1990–present
- Member of: Clutch, The Bakerton Group

Richard Timothy Sult is an American musician best known as the guitarist for the rock band Clutch. He is also the guitarist for an instrumental side project, The Bakerton Group, and an occasional member of the reggae rock / stoner rock band Lionize, as well as the band Deep Swell.

== With Clutch ==
Sult has remained the guitarist for Clutch since the group started in 1991. Since then, the band has released 13 studio albums and toured extensively through North America, Europe, UK and Australia. The band continues to be an important fixture on today's hard rock scene, playing an average of 120 shows a year.

== Equipment ==
Sult has been most known to use a Gibson SG Standard, paired with a Wah-Pedal, a Phaser Pedal, a Line-6 DL-4, an MXR Carbon Copy, and an Electro-Harmonix POG.

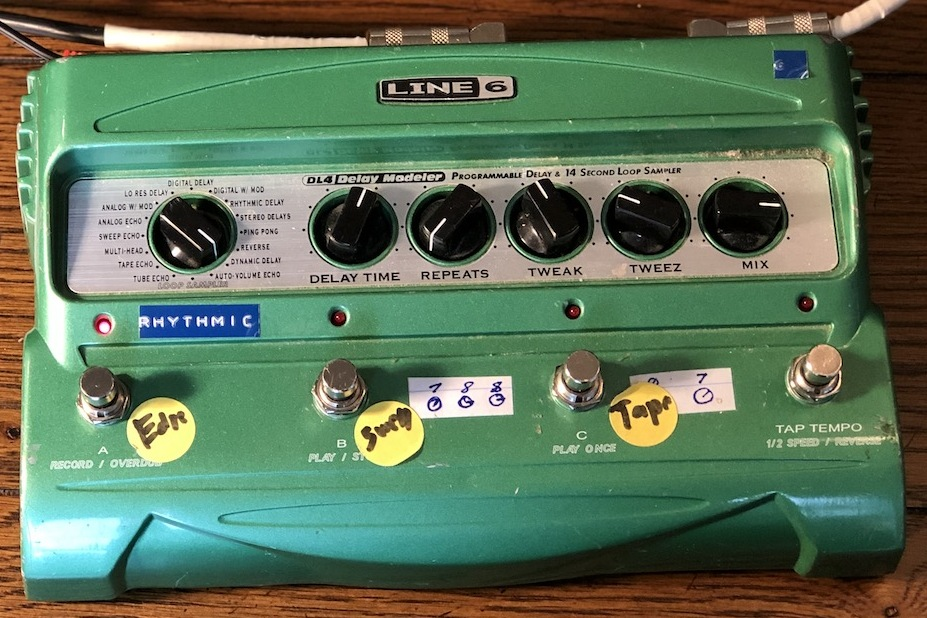
A Line-6 DL-4, the same make and model used by Tim Sult
