= Bad Brains discography =

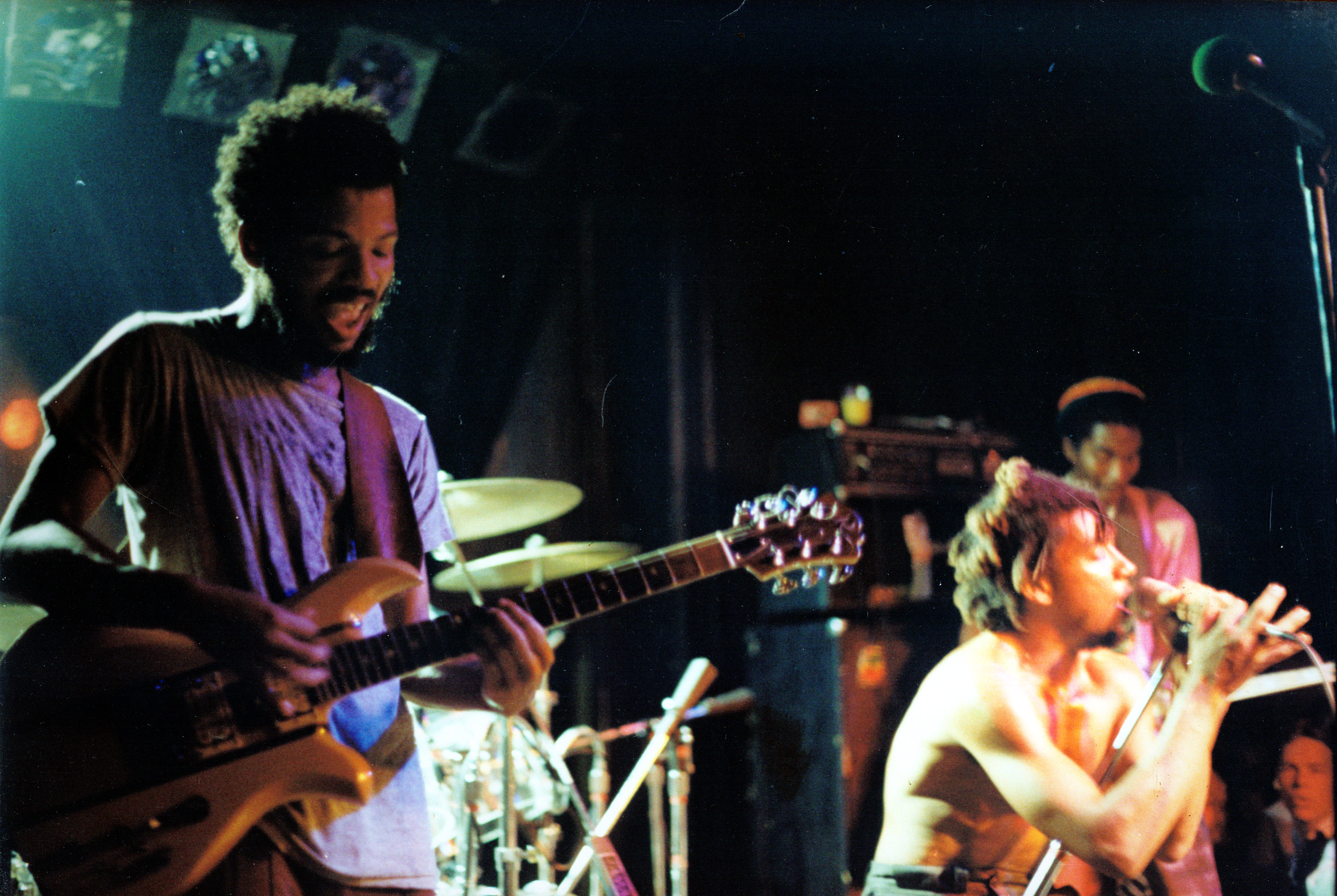
- Bad Brains at 9:30 Club, Washington, D.C., 1983
- Studio albums: 9
- Extended plays: 4
- Live albums: 4
- Compilation albums: 1
- Demos: 1

This is a comprehensive discography of Bad Brains, a Washington, D.C.–based hardcore punk band that also plays reggae and uses styles of funk and heavy metal into their music. To date, the band has released nine full-length studio albums (including an instrumental dub album), four EPs, four live recordings, one compilation album, one demo album, and more than a dozen singles.

== Studio albums ==
| Year | Title | Comments |
|---|---|---|
| 1982 | Bad Brains: Label: ROIR Records; Formats: CD, Vinyl LP, Cassette | Debut studio album.; This album was originally released only on cassette.; In-Effect Records released a CD version with the same track listing entitled Attitude: The ROIR Sessions in 1989. |
| 1983 | Rock for Light: Label: PVC Records; Formats: CD, Vinyl LP, Cassette | Contains a number of re-recorded tracks from their first album.; Reissued by Caroline Records in 1991. The reissue was remixed by the album's producer Ric Ocasek and bassist Darryl Jenifer.; Bad Brains broke up for the first time after the release of this album. |
| 1986 | I Against I: Label: SST Records; Formats: CD, Vinyl LP, Cassette | First release on SST Records.; Regarded as the highest selling album in the band's catalogue, I Against I is a critically acclaimed album of American hardcore punk mixed with funk, soul, and heavy metal.; This is the only Bad Brains album that does not include reggae music. |
| 1989 | Quickness: Label: Caroline Records; Formats: CD, Vinyl LP, Cassette | Earl is credited for drumming but didn't actually play on the album. Mackie Jayson of Cro-Mags handled the drum tracks instead.; On this album, the band continues the same style they used on I Against I. |
| 1993 | Rise: Label: Epic Records; Formats: CD, Vinyl LP, Cassette | First Bad Brains album on a major label.; The only Bad Brains album without H.R. and his brother Earl. Their respective replacements were Israel Joseph I on vocals and Mackie Jayson, who was a session drummer on Quickness. |
| 1995 | God of Love: Label: Maverick Records; Formats: CD, Vinyl LP, Cassette | The first Bad Brains album recorded with the original lineup in nine years.; Final album before disbanding again. |
| 2002 | I & I Survived: Label: Reggae Lounge; Formats: CD | Mostly an instrumental dub album featuring a large amount of reggae, ska, and dub elements with only occasional forays into hard rock and punk music, as opposed to their other albums which are the other way around.; Contains remakes of Bad Brains' past material.; H.R. does not appear on this album. |
| 2007 | Build a Nation: Label: Megaforce Records; Formats: CD, Vinyl LP | Bad Brains' first album of original material in 12 years.; The first Bad Brains album to appear on the Billboard 200, debuting at #100.; Produced by Adam Yauch of the Beastie Boys. |
| 2012 | Into the Future: Label: Megaforce Records; Formats: CD, Vinyl LP | |

== Live albums ==
| Year | Title | Comments |
|---|---|---|
| 1988 | Live: Label: SST Records; Format: CD, Vinyl LP, Cassette | This recording's concert is from the band's 1988 tour. |
| 1990 | The Youth Are Getting Restless: Label: Caroline Records; Format: CD, Vinyl LP, Cassette | Recorded live at the Paradiso (Amsterdam) Theater in Amsterdam, the Netherlands, in 1987 by VPRO Radio. The show was part of the band's I Against I tour. |
| 2001 | A Bad Brains Reunion Live from Maritime Hall: Label: 2B1 Records; Format: CD | Recorded live in 1999.; During this time, the band were unable to use the name "Bad Brains" as they were embattled in legal turmoil with their prior management company. For over three years, the band had to tour under the name "Soul Brains" even though the original lineup of Bad Brains was intact. |
| 2006 | Live at CBGB 1982: Label: MVD Records; Format: CD | Recorded live at the now-defunct New York City club CBGB's in 1982.; A DVD of this concert was also released. |

== Compilation albums ==
| Year | Title | Comments |
|---|---|---|
| 2003 | Banned in D.C.: Label: Caroline Records; Format: CD | This compilation spans all their material up to Quickness. |

== Demo albums ==
| Year | Title | Comments |
|---|---|---|
| 1996 | Black Dots: Label: Caroline Records; Format: CD, Vinyl LP, Cassette | This album - which served as the band's demo - was recorded at Inner Ear Studios in 1979, which at the time was in Don Zientara's basement. |

== Extended plays ==
| Year | Title | Comments |
|---|---|---|
| 1982 | Bad Brains: Label: Alternative Tentacles, UK; Format: 12" vinyl | Songs from ROIR sessions; Part of a series of EPs by American bands that Alternative Tentacles released exclusively in the UK |
| 1982 | I And I Survive: Label: Bad Brains Records; Format: 12" vinyl | From Rock for Light sessions, produced by Ric Ocasek; Released in the UK by Food for Thought Records |
| 1991 | Spirit Electricity: Label: SST Records; Format: CD, Vinyl LP, Cassette | Last release on SST Records.; The EP was actually recorded live during the I Against I tour. |
| 1997 | The Omega Sessions: Label: Victory Records; Format: CD, Vinyl LP | The material on this EP was recorded in 1980 but wasn't released until 1997. |

== Singles ==
| Year | Title | Comments |
|---|---|---|
| 1980 | "Pay to Cum" b/w "Stay Close to Me": Label: Bad Brains Records; Format: 7" vinyl | First release by the band.; The A-side was featured on the Let Them Eat Jellybeans! compilation, released by Alternative Tentacles in 1981.; The 1990 single of "Pay to Cum" released by Caroline Records is a different version, recorded live in 1987 and taken from The Youth Are Getting Restless. |

== Music videos ==
| Year | Title | Director |
|---|---|---|
| 1986 | "I Against I" | Paul Rachman |
| 1986 | "Hired Gun" | |
| 1989 | "Soul Craft" | Paul Rachman |
| 1993 | "Rise" | Paul Rachman |
| 1995 | "God of Love" | Samuel Bayer |
| 2007 | "Give Thanks and Praises/Jah Love" | Shavo Odadjian |
| 2013 | "Ragga Dub (Perro Bravo Remix)" featuring Angelo Moore of Fishbone | Jeff Pliskin |

== Other appearances ==
- Let Them Eat Jellybeans! (Alternative Tentacles LP, 1981) featured the 45 version of "Pay to Cum"
- New York Thrash (ROIR cassette, 1982) featured the songs "Regulator" and "Big Takeover" from Bad Brains
- Rat Music for Rat People (CD Presents, 1982) (Songs "How Low Can a Punk Get?" and "You")
- Pump Up the Volume Motion Picture Soundtrack (1990) (Song "Kick Out the Jams" with Henry Rollins)
- H.R. appeared on the song "Without Jah, Nothin'" by P.O.D., track 13 on the 2001 album Satellite.
- H.R. also appeared on the song "New Sun" on Long Beach Dub All-Stars' debut album Right Back (1999).
- The band contributed the music of "Re-Ignition" to a remix of Lil Jon's "Real Nigga Roll Call".
- "I Against I" appeared in the video game Matt Hoffman's Pro BMX 2 as well as EA's Skate.
- "Soul Craft" was featured in the video game Backyard Wrestling 2.
- "Banned in D.C." appeared in the video game Tony Hawk's Proving Ground.
- "Banned in D.C." also appeared in the video game Saints Row.
- "Right Brigade" appeared in the video game Grand Theft Auto IV.
- A considerable part of the punk documentary American Hardcore (2006) is devoted to Bad Brains.
- H.R. and Darryl Jenifer contributed to "Riya" on rapper Ill Bill's album The Hour of Reprisal.
- "Re-Ignition" is heavily sampled on drum and bass producer Hive's "Ultrasonic Sound."
