= Banned in D.C. =

Banned in DC: Bad Brains' Greatest Riffs

Compilation album by Bad Brains
- Released: April 8, 2003
- Recorded: 1979–1989
- Genre: Hardcore punk; reggae
- Length: 66:53
- Label: Caroline
- Producer: Ric Ocasek; Ron St. Germain

Bad Brains chronology
I & I Survived (2002)	Banned in DC: Bad Brains' Greatest Riffs (2003)	Live at CBGB 1982 (2006)

Banned in D.C. is a compilation of hardcore punk and reggae songs by Bad Brains. All the tracks have been previously released, except for the instrumental version of "Riot Squad". In addition, the original single version of "Pay to Cum" and the original mixes of several tracks from Rock for Light see their first appearance on CD here. The only studio albums not represented on this compilation are Rise and God of Love, although they were released between Quickness and Black Dots.

== Reception ==
Professional ratings
Review scores
Source	Rating
AllMusic	4.5/5 stars
Robert Christgau	A
Pitchfork	9.1/10
Rolling Stone	4/5 stars

In 2013, the singer Bilal named it among his 25 favorite albums, explaining that, "I just like the breakneck tempos and their I-don't-give-a-fuck attitude. It's just awesome."

== Track listing ==
1. "Pay to Cum" (7" version)
2. "I Against I" (The Omega Sessions album version)
3. "Don't Bother Me" (Black Dots album version)
4. "I" (Bad Brains album version)
5. "Regulator" (Black Dots album version)
6. "F.V.K." (Bad Brains album version)
7. "Re-Ignition" (I Against I album version)
8. "Sailin' On" (Rock for Light album version, original mix)
9. "How Low Can a Punk Get?" (Black Dots album version)
10. "At the Movies" (Rock for Light album version, original mix)
11. "With the Quickness" (Quickness album version)
12. "Sacred Love" (I Against I album version)
13. "Soul Craft" (Quickness album version)
14. "Voyage to Infinity" (Quickness album version)
15. "Banned in DC" (Rock for Light album version, original mix)
16. "Big Takeover" (The Youth Are Getting Restless album version)
17. "Joshua's Song" (Rock for Light album version, original mix)
18. "I and I Survive" (12" version)
19. "The Meek" (Rock for Light album version)
20. "I Luv I Jah" (The Omega Sessions album version)
21. "The Prophet's Eye" (Quickness album version)
22. "Riot Squad" (instrumental version)

== Personnel ==
- H.R. – vocals
- Dr. Know – guitar
- Darryl Jenifer – bass
- Earl Hudson – drums
