= Live at CBGB 1982 =

Live album by Bad Brains

Live album by Bad Brains
- Released: October 31, 2006
- Recorded: December 24–26, 1982
- Venue: CBGB (Manhattan, New York)
- Genre: Hardcore punk; reggae
- Label: Reggae Lounge

Bad Brains chronology
Banned in D.C. (2003)	Live at CBGB 1982 (2006)	Build a Nation (2007)

Live at CBGB 1982 is a live album and DVD capturing American rock band Bad Brains in concert at the historic New York City club CBGB in December 1982. The show features several tracks from the first three Bad Brains albums - Black Dots, Bad Brains, and the soon-to-be-released Rock for Light. The album also contains previously unreleased material, such as the reggae tunes "King of Glory" and "I And I Rasta."

== CD track listing ==
1. "Big Takeover"
2. "I"
3. "Jah the Conqueror"
4. "Supertouch/Shitfit"
5. "Rally Round Jah Throne"
6. "Right Brigade"
7. "F.V.K."
8. "I and I Survive"
9. "Destroy Babylon"
10. "Joshua's Song"
11. "Unity Dub"
12. "The Meek Shall Inherit"
13. "Banned in DC"
14. "How Low Can a Punk Get?"
15. "Riot Squad"
16. "I and I Rasta"
17. "We Will Not"
18. "The Regulator"
19. "All Rise to Meet Jah"

== DVD track listing ==
Live at CBGB's 1982

Video by Bad Brains
- Released: 2006
- Recorded: 1982

1. "Big Takeover"
2. "Attitude"
3. "I"
4. "I and I Rasta"
5. "Supertouch/Shitfit"
6. "King of Glory with Dave Hahn"
7. "Right Brigade"
8. "F.V.K."
9. "Banned in D.C."
10. "How Low Can a Punk Get?"
11. "The Meek Shall Inherit"
12. "Riot Squad"
13. "We Will Not"
14. "Coptic Times"
15. "At the Movies"
16. "Right Brigade"
17. "Rally Round Jah Throne"
18. "Redbone in the City"
19. "Pay to Cum"
20. "I and I Survive"

== Personnel ==
- H.R. - vocals
- Dr. Know - guitar
- Darryl Jenifer - bass
- Earl Hudson - drums
