= A Bad Brains Reunion Live from Maritime Hall =

A Bad Brains Reunion: Live at Maritime Hall SF

Live album by Bad Brains
- Released: 21 October 2001
- Recorded: 1999
- Genres: Hardcore punk; reggae

Bad Brains chronology
God of Love (1995)	A Bad Brains Reunion: Live at Maritime Hall SF (2001)	I And I Survived (2002)

A Bad Brains Reunion Live at Maritime Hall is the third live album by American rock band Bad Brains. It marks the reunion of the band after a four-year breakup. At the time, the band was unable to use the name "Bad Brains" as they were embattled in legal turmoil with their prior management company. For over three years, the band had to tour under the name "Soul Brains" even though the original lineup of Bad Brains was intact.

The album came under sharp criticism upon its release due to changes in the singing style of frontman H.R.. In contrast to his earlier high-energy style, he was accused of a lackadaisical performance at this reunion concert recorded live in 1999 at the Maritime Hall theater in San Francisco. Moreover, many of the tracks had already appeared on the previous two live Bad Brains albums.

One new song—"On Like Popcorn"—was also released as a single in preparation for a new studio album, but the band broke up once again in 2000. It was later included on their 2012 studio album Into the Future.

== Track listing ==
1. "Attitude" – 1:43
2. "Coptic Times" – 2:27
3. "At the Movies" – 2:44
4. "Right Brigade" – 2:36
5. "Day Tripper"/"She's a Rainbow" – 5:52
6. "Soulcraft" – 2:25
7. "Tongue Tee Tie" – 3:08
8. "Re-Ignition" – 6:47
9. "Sailin' On"/"I & I Survive" – 8:52
10. "House of Suffering " – 2:20
11. "On Like Popcorn" – 3:20
12. "Sacred Love" – 3:47
13. "Youth Are Getting Restless" – 6:46
14. "Pay to Cum" – 2:22
15. "I Against I" – 3:12

== Personnel ==
- H.R. – vocals
- Dr. Know – guitar
- Darryl Jenifer – bass
- Earl Hudson – drums
