= Spirit Electricity =

EP by Bad Brains
- Released: 1991
- Recorded: 1987
- Genre: Hardcore punk; roots reggae; dub
- Label: SST (228)

Bad Brains chronology
Quickness (1989)	Spirit Electricity (1991)	Rise (1993)

Professional ratings
Review scores
Source	Rating
AllMusic	3/5 stars

Spirit Electricity is an EP by American rock band Bad Brains, released by SST in 1991. It was recorded live in concert in 1987 during the same tour that spawned the live albums The Youth Are Getting Restless and Live. The EP includes several live classics as well as the only officially available live version of the rare "Return to Heaven."

== Track listing ==
1. Return to Heaven
2. Let Me Help
3. Day Tripper/She's a Rainbow
4. Banned in D.C.
5. Attitude
6. Youth Are Getting Restless

== Personnel ==
- Dr. Know – guitar
- H.R. – vocals
- Earl Hudson – drums
- Darryl Jenifer – bass
