= Build a Nation =

Studio album by Bad Brains
- Released: June 26, 2007
- Recorded: 2004–2007
- Genre: Hardcore punk; Reggae
- Length: 37:34
- Label: Megaforce
- Producer: Adam Yauch

Bad Brains chronology
I & I Survived (2002)	Build a Nation (2007)	Into the Future (2012)

Professional ratings
Aggregate scores
Source	Rating
Metacritic	73/100
Review scores
Source	Rating
AllMusic	3.5/5 stars
Alternative Press	3.5/5 stars
Entertainment Weekly	B+
IGN	8.8/10
The Observer	4/5 stars
Pitchfork Media	6.9/10
Rolling Stone	3/5 stars
Spin	7/10 stars

Build a Nation is the eighth full-length studio album by American rock band Bad Brains. Released on June 26, 2007, through Megaforce Records, with distribution by Oscilloscope Laboratories, the album was produced by Adam Yauch of Beastie Boys, a longtime friend and supporter of the band. The release coincided with the 30th anniversary of the band’s formation.

The album was issued on CD and as a limited-edition multi-colored vinyl pressing, featuring red, green, and yellow vinyl—a nod to the band's Rastafarian influences. The album's photography was done by Annie Leibovitz.

Build a Nation debuted at number 100 on the Billboard 200 during its first week of release.

== Background ==
Nearly three years in production, Build a Nation is Bad Brains' first album of original material since 1995's God of Love. The 1996 release Black Dots is a collection of early recordings, while I & I Survived (2002) is a remix album.

In April 2004, the Beastie Boys' official website revealed that Adam Yauch would produce Bad Brains' follow-up to God of Love. It was also announced that the band had recorded the album at Yauch’s studio and were in the process of mixing it.

In February 2005, bassist Darryl Jenifer told Billboard that Bad Brains were in the studio recording their first proper studio album in ten years, with plans for a release later that year. Yauch confirmed in interviews that he was producing the sessions, which featured basic tracks recorded by the band's original lineup. Frontman H.R. was also confirmed to be participating, and the album was expected to mark a return to the band's early hardcore punk sound.

In November 2006, guitarist Dr. Know described the sound of the new album, stating:

There's a lot of dubs and there's some old school-meets-new school Brains, not moderate tempo, but fast tempo. Yauch said, 'Man, I want y'all to do some old school-type shit,' so we did it like that. I want to start working on the next one, because we did that one two years ago already.

— Dr. Know

In January 2007, it was announced that Build a Nation would be the title of the album. In March, the band announced they had signed with Megaforce Records.

On April 26, 2007, the official release date of Build a Nation was confirmed as June 26, 2007.

The album was leaked online on May 10, 2007.

On May 15, 2007, it was announced that System of a Down bassist Shavo Odadjian would direct the music video for the album's first single, "Give Thanks and Praises." The video, which features a live concert performance, was available on the band's MySpace page as of August 2007. Odadjian appears at the end of the video alongside frontman H.R., with the two seen walking off stage and smoking a marijuana joint.

== Track listing ==
1. "Give Thanks and Praises" – 2:25
2. "Jah People Make the World Go Round" – 2:09
3. "Pure Love" – 0:56
4. "Natty Dreadlocks 'pon the Mountain Top" – 3:32
5. "Build a Nation" – 1:44
6. "Expand Your Soul" – 2:49
7. "Jah Love" – 3:07
8. "Let There Be Angels (Just Like You)" – 2:27
9. "Universal Peace" – 3:04
10. "Roll On" – 4:04
11. "Until Kingdom Comes" – 3:19
12. "In the Beginning" – 1:32
13. "Send You No Flowers" – 2:32
14. "Peace Be Unto Thee" – 3:54
15. "Married Again" (bonus track on 7" box set)

== Personnel ==
- H.R. – vocals
- Dr. Know – guitar
- Darryl Jenifer – bass
- Earl Hudson – drums
- Jamie Saft – keyboards
