= The Youth Are Getting Restless =

Live album by Bad Brains
- Released: 1990
- Recorded: 1987, Amsterdam, the Netherlands
- Genre: Hardcore punk; heavy metal; reggae; funk metal
- Label: Caroline

Bad Brains chronology
Quickness (1989)	The Youth Are Getting Restless (1990)	Spirit Electricity (1991)

The Youth Are Getting Restless is a live album by American rock band Bad Brains. It was recorded at the Paradiso Theater in Amsterdam, the Netherlands, in 1987 by the VPRO. The show was part of the band's I Against I tour. It remains one of the group's best selling albums.

The album captures Bad Brains in concert at the height of their commercial and critical peak, featuring a diverse mix of hardcore punk, mellow reggae, funk, and heavy metal. Two of the reggae tracks are cover songs: Dennis Brown's "Revolution," and a rearranged medley of the Rolling Stones's "She's a Rainbow" and The Beatles's "Day Tripper."

== Critical reception ==
Professional ratings
Review scores
Source	Rating
AllMusic	3/5 stars
Robert Christgau	(1-star Honorable Mention)
The Encyclopedia of Popular Music	3/5 stars
The New Rolling Stone Album Guide	4/5 stars

The New York Times wrote that the album is a "virtual greatest-hits collection, played with blistering intensity and engineered with its muscle intact."

== Track listing ==
1. "I" – 2:33
2. "Rock for Light" – 1:40
3. "Right Brigade" – 2:30
4. "House of Suffering" (Paul Hudson, Gary Miller) – 2:04
5. "Day Tripper/She's a Rainbow" (Lennon–McCartney/Jagger–Richards) – 4:53
6. "Coptic Times" – 2:10
7. "Sacred Love" (Hudson, Darryl Jenifer, Miller) – 3:27
8. "Re-Ignition" (Hudson, Jenifer, Miller) – 4:30
9. "Let Me Help" (Hudson, Jenifer, Miller) – 1:54
10. "The Youth Are Getting Restless" – 3:58
11. "Banned in D.C." – 2:14
12. "Sailin' On" – 1:52
13. "Fearless Vampire Killers" – 1:12
14. "At the Movies" – 2:50
15. "Revolution" (Dennis Brown) – 4:27
16. "Pay to Cum" – 1:41
17. "Big Takeover" – 3:26

All songs composed by Bad Brains except where noted.

=== Personnel ===
- H.R. – vocals
- Dr. Know – guitar
- Darryl Jenifer – bass
- Earl Hudson – drums
