= Live (Bad Brains album) =

Live album by Bad Brains
- Released: 1988
- Genre: Hardcore punk; heavy metal; reggae; funk metal
- Label: SST
- Producer: Phil Burnett

Bad Brains chronology
I Against I (1986)	Live (1988)	Quickness (1989)

Live is a live album by American rock band Bad Brains. It was recorded during a 1987 tour. "Day Tripper", a Beatles cover, appears on some editions. After the tour finished, the band commenced a series of departures, breakups, and reunions.

== Background ==
The album was produced by Phil Burnett. Two subsequent live albums were drawn from the same 1987 tour.

== Critical reception ==
Professional ratings
Review scores
Source	Rating
AllMusic	4.5/5 stars
The Encyclopedia of Popular Music	2/5 stars
MusicHound Rock: The Essential Album Guide	4/5 stars
The Rolling Stone Album Guide	2/5 stars
The New Rolling Stone Album Guide	3/5 stars
Spin Alternative Record Guide	8/10

AllMusic wrote: "Live is such a stunner because the basic inimitable qualities are still here: the unbelievable overload attack, the crashing power riffs, the stop-start precision marveled at by every casual listener who ever came across them, the explosive surges, the awesome musicians, the breathtaking exhilaration rush, and most of all, the irreplaceable singer H.R." Trouser Press called the album "impressive," writing that the band play "punk, thrashy rock and reggae with equal command and conviction (Earl Hudson’s deft drumming is crucial to the band’s gear-shifting ability)." The New Rolling Stone Album Guide deemed the album inferior to The Youth Are Getting Restless.

== Track listing ==
1. "I" – 2:27
2. "At the Movies" – 3:02
3. "The Regulator" – 1:16
4. "Right Brigade" – 2:34
5. "I Against I" – 3:02
6. "I & I Survive" – 6:12
7. "House of Suffering" – 2:17
8. "Re-Ignition" – 4:34
9. "Sacred Love" – 3:26
10. "She's Calling You" – 3:19
11. "Coptic Times" – 2:21
12. "F.V.K." (Fearless Vampire Killers) – 1:07
13. "Secret 77" – 4:06
14. "Daytripper" – 4:34

== Personnel ==
- H.R. – vocals
- Dr. Know – guitar
- Darryl Jenifer – bass
- Earl Hudson – drums
