= Attitude =

Attitude may refer to:

== Philosophy and psychology ==
- Attitude (psychology), a disposition or state of mind
  - Attitude change
- Propositional attitude, a mental state held towards a proposition

== Science and technology ==
- Orientation (geometry), or attitude, part of the description of how an object is placed in the space it occupies
- Aircraft attitude, in aircraft flight dynamics, relative to the atmospheric frame or terrain
- Spacecraft attitude, controlled by spacecraft attitude control
- Attitude or orientation of a vehicle, described using axes conventions

== Arts, entertainment and media ==
=== Music ===
- Attitudes (band), a 1970s pop/rock quartet
- Attitude Records, a record label of Gary Glitter

==== Albums ====
- Attitude (April Wine album) (1993)
- Attitude (Collette album) (1991)
- Attitude (Meisa Kuroki EP), 2010
- Attitude (Hyuna EP), 2024
- Attitudes (Lorie album), 2004
- Attitude (Rip Rig + Panic album) (1983)
- Attitudes (Demis Roussos album) (1982)
- Attitude (Susperia album)
- Attitude (Troop album) (1989)
- Attitude, a 2019 album by Mrs. Green Apple
- Attitudes, a 1982 album by Brass Construction
- Attitude: The ROIR Sessions, a 1989 reissue of the 1982 album Bad Brains

==== Songs ====
- "Attitude" (Alien Ant Farm song) (2002)
- "Attitude" (The Kinks song) (1979)
- "Attitude" (Misfits song) (1978)
- "Attitude" (Sepultura song) (1996)
- "Attitude" (Suede song) (2003)
- "Attitude" (Don Toliver song) (2024)
- "Attitude" (Ive song) (2025)
- "The Attitude", by Annihilator from Ballistic, Sadistic
- "Attitude", by Bad Brains from Black Dots
- "Attitude", by Nick Cannon from the album Nick Cannon
- "Attitude", by Fireflight from The Healing of Harms
- "Attitude", by Information Society from the album Information Society
- "Attitude", by Metallica from ReLoad

=== Television ===
- Attitude, a New Zealand TV show by Attitude Pictures Ltd
- Attitudes (talk show), an American TV show

=== Other uses in arts, entertainment and media ===
- Attitude (art), the posture or gesture given to a figure by a painter or sculptor
- Attitude (ballet position), in which the dancer stands on one leg with the other leg raised and turned out
- Attitude (magazine), a British gay lifestyle magazine
- Attitude: The New Subversive Cartoonists, a series of anthologies of alternative comics, photos and interviews
- WWF Attitude, a 1999 video game
- Attitudes!, a weekly comedy podcast

== Other uses ==
- Attitude (heraldry), the position in which a figure is emblazoned
- Attitude (obstetrics), relationship of fetal head to spine
- Attitude Era, a major era of professional wrestling
- Dodge Attitude, a series of vehicles sold by Fiat Chrysler Automobiles

== See also ==
- Bad Attitude (disambiguation)
- Altitude, a distance measurement, usually in the vertical or "up" direction
- Rotation formalisms in three dimensions
