= I & I Survived =

Studio album by Bad Brains
- Released: November 26, 2002
- Genre: Dub; reggae; hardcore punk
- Length: 53:54
- Label: Reggae Lounge
- Producer: Darryl Jenifer, Gary Miller, and Neil Robertson

Bad Brains chronology
A Bad Brains Reunion Live from Maritime Hall (2001)	I & I Survived (2002)	Banned in D.C. (2003)

Professional ratings
Review scores
Source	Rating
AllMusic	3/5 stars

I & I Survived is the seventh full-length studio album by American rock band Bad Brains.

This album inverts the emphasis of Bad Brains' previous albums, which stress their punk/metal/hard rock side alongside touches of reggae. In contrast, I & I Survived is a mostly instrumental offering emphasizing reggae, ska, and dub elements (including a horn section on several songs) with only occasional forays into hard rock and punk music. The voice of band vocalist H.R. does appear on the album, albeit in sampled form from previous albums.

The album includes new songs alongside completely revamped remakes of a few Bad Brains classics such as 1983's "How Low Can a Punk Get?", two versions of the Quickness classic "Gene Machine", and a dancehall reggae version of the usually mellow "I & I Survive".

Critic Todd Kristel of Allmusic.com gave the album 3-out-of-5 stars, describing it as "a solid effort even if it doesn't break a lot of new ground".

== Track listing ==
1. Jah Love (Jenifer, Miller)
2. Overdub (Jenifer, Miller)
3. How Low Can a Punk Get? (Jenifer, Miller)
4. I & I Survive (Jenifer, Miller)
5. Cowboy (Jenifer, Miller)
6. Gene Machine (Jenifer, Miller)
7. Ghetto (Ray Chinna Shim)
8. Rally (Jenifer, Miller)
9. September (Ray Chinna Shim)
10. Ragga Dub (Jenifer, Miller)
11. Gene Machine (remix) (Jenifer, Miller; remixed by Daryl Jenifer and Neil Robertson)
12. I & I Survive (Shiner Massive Mix) (Jenifer, Miller; remixed by Will Fulton, featuring Larry "Son Shiner" Devore)

== Personnel ==
- Dr. Know – guitar & keyboards
- Darryl Jenifer – bass, programming & melodica
- Earl Hudson – drums
- Ted Orr – Tablas
- Neil Robertson, Darryl Jenifer & Dr. Know – producers
