= Black Dots =

Demo album by Bad Brains
- Released: October 1, 1996
- Recorded: June 1979
- Studios: Inner Ear, Arlington County, Virginia
- Genres: Hardcore punk; reggae
- Length: 34:29
- Label: Caroline (CAR 7534)
- Producer: Bad Brains

Bad Brains chronology
God of Love (1995)	Black Dots (1996)	The Omega Sessions (1997)

Black Dots is a demo album by the American rock band Bad Brains, released in 1996 by Caroline Records. It consists of one of the band's earliest recording sessions, which took place in 1979 at Inner Ear Studios with recording engineer Don Zientara. Black Dots features early versions of several songs that were later recorded for the band's first two studio albums, as well as songs that had never previously been released in any versions. The album showcases the band's hardcore punk origins, as well as their early foray into reggae with the song "The Man Won't Annoy Ya."

== Background ==
In Prince George's County, Maryland, in early 1978, brothers Paul and Earl Hudson formed a band with their high school classmates Gary Miller, Darryl Jenifer, and Sid McCray. Paul was the rhythm guitarist, Earl the drummer, Miller the lead guitarist under the stage name "Dr. Know," Jenifer the bassist, and McCray the singer. Calling themselves Mind Power, they initially played jazz fusion in the style of Weather Report and the Mahavishnu Orchestra, and extolled the virtues of PMA (positive mental attitude). When McCray introduced the others to punk rock later that year, the band grafted their jazz musicianship onto punk's aggressive style and changed their name to Bad Brains, and Paul took the stage name H.R.

The material on Black Dots was written between late 1978 and mid-1979, when the band members were living together in a house on Bay Way in Forestville, Maryland, just outside of Washington, D.C. Dr. Know had acquired the house from the manager of a Rustler Steak House where he worked. H.R. and Jenifer also worked there briefly, then took jobs washing cars at a nearby car dealership, while Hudson washed clothes at a community hospital. Dr. Know and H.R. then began working late shifts at Atlantic Research and Development. At night, the band would rehearse at the Bay Way house, where they also put on a series of basement shows. McCray's girlfriend would often tackle him off the stage early in the set, leaving H.R. to take over the vocals for the rest of the show. McCray soon left the band, and H.R. switched from rhythm guitar to singer. "The cosmics at the time weren't making it happen with Sid," Jenifer later said. "He was way ahead of his time even with us. He was so esoteric, like the minute two people started clapping for Bad Brains he was like, 'This is commercial.' He stepped out of the picture and we took the band and ran with it." When the band left the Bay Way house, Jenifer moved in with McCray, who later became his bass tech, and the other members moved back in with their parents.

== Recording ==
By early 1979 Bad Brains were making a name for themselves in Washington, D.C.'s burgeoning hardcore punk scene, playing clubs including the Atlantis and Madam's Organ, and recorded a demo tape of one of their rehearsals. Local band the Slickee Boys heard the tape and suggested the band go into the fledgling Inner Ear Studios in Arlington County, Virginia to record the songs with engineer Don Zientara. Inner Ear then consisted of Zientara's basement, outfitted with a 4-track TEAC quarter-inch tape deck and a small drum booth set up to one side. Dr. Know, Jenifer, and Hudson set up in the basement space. Since it lacked an isolation booth, H.R. ran his vocal mic out to the back yard and performed there. Zientara set the recording equipment up in the kitchen on the first floor. The band recorded a version of their song "Don't Bother Me" there that March, produced by Slickee Boys guitarist Kim Kane, mixed by him and Skip Groff, and released that fall on The Best of Limp (...Rest of Limp), a compilation put out by Groff's Limp Records label. The recording session that produced Black Dots took place that June, and was the band's first full-length studio session. They played straight through their live set of the time, consisting of all the songs they had written up to that point. The spartan session resulted in a lot of reverberation on the drums. Zientara can be heard speaking with H.R. in between tracks, and Zientara's child can be heard asking about a tape recorder.

Finding themselves banned from The Bayou after opening for the Damned, and with the Atlantis being remodeled into the 9:30 Club, Bad Brains relocated to New York City to join its more fertile punk club scene. There, they recorded their 1982 debut album which included new recordings of several songs that had been part of their Inner Ear session: "Don't Need It," "Pay to Cum," "Supertouch/Shitfit," "Regulator," "Banned in D. C.," and "Attitude." In 1982 they recorded versions of "Black Dots," "Send You No Flowers," and "Redbone in the City" for a compilation they organized through producer Jerry Williams' East Village studio 171A, where they recorded and performed, but it was never released. Anthony Countey, who later became their manager, began working with them that year; Dr. Know gave him a list of all the band's recording sessions and where the tapes could be found, but with an offer from Ric Ocasek on the table to record their second album (1983's Rock for Light, which included "How Low Can a Punk Get?" as well as new versions of "Attitude" and "Banned in D. C."), Countey decided that it was not the right time to review older tapes. Thus, the tapes from the Inner Ear session remained with Zientara, unmixed and unreleased, for 17 years.

== Release ==
When the band broke up following their 1995 album God of Love, Countey retrieved the Inner Ear tapes and they were mixed in June 1996 by Sean Green at Applehead Recording in Woodstock, New York. The recordings were mastered by Howie Weinberg at Masterdisk. Dr. Know and Jenifer came up with the cover concept with Roger Gorman, who designed the album's packaging. Eight of the sixteen songs on Black Dots had never been previously released in any versions, including the title track, "At the Atlantis," "You're a Migraine," "Why'd You Have to Go?," "The Man Won't Annoy Ya," "Redbone in the City," "Just Another Damn Song," and "Send You No Flowers." "Don't Bother Me" had only been released on the Limp Records compilation in its earlier recorded version.

== Critical reception ==
Reviewing Black Dots for Entertainment Weekly at the time of its release, Tom Sinclair gave it an "A" rating and remarked that it "captures the seminal Washington, D.C., hardcore band as they began to cohere into something special. With early versions of the mosh-pit anthems 'Pay to Cum' and 'Banned in D.C.' (and a great Sex Pistols rip, 'Redbone in the City'), Black Dots could serve as a primer for neophyte punks. Come to think of it, the current incarnation of the band — whose recent work has been spotty — might do well to study this." Writing for AllMusic, critic Ned Raggett called it "an archival release of the best kind, something truly rare and unheard that also captured a band at its best." In a retrospective review for Citizine in 2004, Mark Prindle wrote that "Not only is Black Dots an excellent look at a great band in their earliest days, but it's a must-own for Bad Brains collectors because hidden among early run-throughs of classic material like 'How Low Can a Punk Get?' and 'Pay to Cum' are many, many rare and [un]released tracks with intriguing titles like 'You're a Migraine,' 'Redbone in the City,' and 'Just Another Damn Song.'"

== Track listing ==
All tracks are written by Bad Brains

No.	Title	Length
1.	"Don't Need It"	1:58
2.	"At the Atlantis"	1:58
3.	"Pay to Cum"	2:02
4.	"Supertouch/Shitfit"	3:02
5.	"Regulator"	1:28
6.	"You're a Migraine"	1:41
7.	"Don't Bother Me"	2:36
8.	"Banned in D.C."	2:47
9.	"Why'd You Have to Go?"	2:55
10.	"The Man Won't Annoy Ya"	2:42
11.	"Redbone in the City"	2:06
12.	"Black Dots"	1:12
13.	"How Low Can a Punk Get?"	2:39
14.	"Just Another Damn Song"	1:57
15.	"Attitude"	1:39
16.	"Send You No Flowers"	1:53
Total length:		34:29

== Personnel ==
Credits adapted from the album's liner notes.

- H.R. – vocals
- Dr. Know – guitar, cover concept
- Darryl Jenifer – bass, cover concept
- Earl Hudson – drums
- Bad Brains – producer
- Don Zientara – recording engineer
- Anthony Countey – mixing engineer
- Sean Green – mixing engineer
- Roger Gorman – cover concept, package design
- Roberto Sherbo – live photographs
- Yoshi Omigoto – studio photography
