= Rise (Bad Brains album) =

Studio album by Bad Brains
- Released: August 1993
- Recorded: March 1993
- Studio: Power Station, New York City
- Genre: Alternative metal; funk metal; crossover thrash
- Length: 41:15
- Label: Epic
- Producer: Beau Hill

Bad Brains chronology
Spirit Electricity (1991)	Rise (1993)	God of Love (1995)

Professional ratings
Review scores
Source	Rating
AllMusic	2/5 stars
Robert Christgau	(dud)
Entertainment Weekly	B−
Q	3/5 stars

Rise is the fifth studio album by American rock band Bad Brains. It is the first Bad Brains album to be released on a major label (Epic Records) and is notable for the absence of two original members: here, Israel Joseph I replaces vocalist H.R. and Cro-Mags drummer Mackie Jayson, who was a session musician on the band's previous album Quickness, replaces drummer Earl Hudson.

The album was released in the wake of a number of funk rock acts whose sounds recalled the latter work of Bad Brains.

== Track listing ==
No.	Title	Writer(s)	Length
1.	"Rise"	Israel Joseph I, Darryl Jenifer	3:38
2.	"Miss Freedom"	Joseph I, Jenifer	2:50
3.	"Unidentified"	Gary Miller, Mackie Jayson, Jenifer	2:39
4.	"Love Is the Answer"	Joseph I, Jenifer, Miller	3:13
5.	"Free"	Joseph I, Jenifer, Jayson	3:13
6.	"Hair" (Graham Central Station cover)	Larry Graham	4:04
7.	"Coming in Numbers"	Jenifer, Miller	2:22
8.	"Yes Jah"	Joseph I, Miller	4:52
9.	"Take Your Time"	Joseph I, Jenifer, Miller, Jayson	4:13
10.	"Peace of Mind"	Joseph I, Jenifer, Miller, Jayson	4:35
11.	"Without You"	Joseph I, Jenifer	5:02
12.	"Outro"	Jenifer, Miller	0:34

== Personnel ==
Bad Brains

- Israel Joseph I – vocals
- Dr. Know – guitar, keyboards
- Darryl Jenifer – bass
- Mackie Jayson – drums
