= Into the Future =

Studio album by Bad Brains
- Released: November 20, 2012
- Recorded: March 2011 – September 2012
- Genre: Hardcore punk; reggae; alternative metal
- Length: 36:54
- Label: Megaforce
- Producer: Darryl Jenifer

Bad Brains chronology
Build a Nation (2007)	Into the Future (2012)

Into the Future is the ninth studio album by the American rock band Bad Brains, released on November 20, 2012, through Megaforce Records. The album is dedicated to Adam Yauch of the Beastie Boys, a longtime friend of the band who died of cancer six months before its release, and produced their previous album Build a Nation. "Popcorn" first appeared on the Bad Brains tribute album Tribute to Bad Brains, where the band appeared under the name Soul Brains.

== Reception ==
Professional ratings
Aggregate scores
Source	Rating
Metacritic	74/100
Review scores
Source	Rating
AllMusic	3.5/5 stars
Consequence of Sound	3/5 stars
Los Angeles Times	3/5 stars
Revolver	3.5/5 stars

Into the Future has received positive reviews. Fred Thomas of AllMusic gave the album a positive review, saying that the album, like Build a Nation, "attempted a return to the ragged glory of the band's early speed-demon hardcore days, and probably came as close as possible given the years and whether they'd seen since ... turning out 13 new jams that volley between dub-styled reggae and the kind of loud-and-fast hardcore with funk and metal undertones that they've been perfecting for ages." However, he adds that "it's not quite as loud and just a little bit less fast than before."

== Track listing ==
1. "Into the Future" - 2:43
2. "Popcorn" - 3:12
3. "We Belong Together" - 1:39
4. "Youth of Today" - 3:25
5. "Rub a Dub Love" - 2:35
6. "Yes I" - 1:28
7. "Suck Sess" - 1:53
8. "Jah Love" - 3:35
9. "Earnest Love" - 3:14
10. "Come Down" - 1:25
11. "Fun" - 3:47
12. "Make a Joyful Noise" - 4:43
13. "MCA Dub" - 3:47

== Personnel ==
- H.R. – vocals
- Dr. Know – guitars
- Darryl Jenifer – bass
- Earl Hudson – drums
- Jamie Saft – keyboards
