= Rock for Light =

Studio album by Bad Brains
- Released: April 15, 1983
- Recorded: 1983
- Studio: Syncro Sound (Boston)
- Genre: Hardcore punk; reggae
- Length: 38:18 (vinyl); 42:04 (CD)
- Label: Passport (original), Caroline (re-issue), ORG Music (2021 ORG Remaster)
- Producer: Ric Ocasek

Bad Brains chronology
Bad Brains (1982)	Rock for Light (1983)	I Against I (1986)

Rock for Light is the second full-length studio album by American rock band Bad Brains, released in 1983. It was produced by Ric Ocasek of The Cars. The 1991 re-issue was remixed by Ocasek and bass player Darryl Jenifer. The re-issued version has some extra tracks, an altered track order, significantly different mixes and, on most tracks, a speed increase of the master which results in a raising of the pitch by one-half step.

The album contains a number of re-recorded songs from the band's first album, Bad Brains, as well as a number of new hardcore punk and reggae tracks. The only tracks from Bad Brains that did not get re-recorded for Rock for Light are "Don't Need It", "The Regulator", "Jah Calling", "Leaving Babylon", "Pay to Cum" and "I Luv I Jah". It was the last Bad Brains album to feature only these two styles of music, as the band eventually experimented with funk, soul and heavy metal.

As Bad Brains broke up after the release of Rock for Light, it was the band's last album for three years. This was the first of several such break-ups during their career.

The original mix was only available on the out-of-print PVC Records version and 1987 CD-versions until 2021. Some of the original mixes appeared on the Banned in D.C. compilation.

== Reception ==
Professional ratings
Review scores
Source	Rating
AllMusic	4/5 stars
Q	3/5 stars
The Rolling Stone Album Guide	4/5 stars
Spin Alternative Record Guide	8/10
The Village Voice	B+

Reviewing for The Village Voice in December 1983, Robert Christgau said, "More than ex-fusioneer Dr. Know on 'gits,' it's the distinctive if not exactly authoritative blackboard-screechy 'throat' of H.R. that provides the quality here, and I like it, kind of. Though this repeats five tunes from their ROIR cassette, it's definitive by virtue of its Ric Ocasek production and vinyl audio." Ian Cranna, appraising the album's 1991 re-issue for Q, noted that the original "never quite captured the band's full, fierce excitement", but praised the re-issue.

== Track listing ==
Original vinyl and CD issue
No.	Title	Length
1.	"Coptic Times"	2:11
2.	"Attitude"	1:12
3.	"We Will Not"	1:39
4.	"Sailin' On"	1:50
5.	"Rally 'Round Jah Throne"	4:39
6.	"Right Brigade"	2:13
7.	"F.V.K."	1:00
8.	"Riot Squad"	2:07
9.	"The Meek Shall Inherit the Earth"	3:35
10.	"Joshua's Song"	0:33
11.	"Banned In D.C."	2:03
12.	"How Low Can a Punk Get?"	1:55
13.	"Big Takeover"	2:35
14.	"I and I Survive"	5:17
15.	"Destroy Babylon"	1:23
16.	"Rock for Light"	1:40
17.	"At the Movies"	2:18
Total length:		38:18

Remastered Reissued CD
No.	Title	Length
1.	"Big Takeover"	2:29
2.	"Attitude"	1:09
3.	"Right Brigade"	2:07
4.	"Joshua's Song"	0:32
5.	"I and I Survive"	5:13
6.	"Banned In D.C."	1:57
7.	"Supertouch"	2:20
8.	"Destroy Babylon"	1:19
9.	"F.V.K. (Fearless Vampire Killers)"	0:58
10.	"The Meek"	3:37
11.	"I"	1:55
12.	"Coptic Times"	2:06
13.	"Sailin' On"	1:45
14.	"Rock for Light"	1:36
15.	"Rally 'Round Jah Throne"	3:58
16.	"At the Movies"	2:16
17.	"Riot Squad"	1:59
18.	"How Low Can a Punk Get?"	1:49
19.	"We Will Not"	1:34
20.	"Jam"	1:15
Total length:		42:04

2021 ORG Remaster
No.	Title	Length
1.	"Coptic Times"	2:11
2.	"Attitude"	1:12
3.	"We Will Not"	1:39
4.	"Sailin' On"	1:50
5.	"Rally 'Round Jah Throne"	4:39
6.	"Right Brigade"	2:13
7.	"F.V.K."	1:00
8.	"Riot Squad"	2:07
9.	"The Meek Shall Inherit the Earth"	3:35
10.	"Joshua's Song"	0:33
11.	"Banned In D.C."	2:03
12.	"How Low Can a Punk Get?"	1:55
13.	"Big Takeover"	2:35
14.	"I and I Survive"	5:17
15.	"Destroy Babylon"	1:23
16.	"Rock for Light"	1:40
17.	"At the Movies"	2:18
Total length:		38:18

== Personnel ==
- H.R. – lead vocals
- Darryl Jenifer – bass, backing vocals, percussion, Prophet 5
- Earl Hudson – drums, backing vocals, percussion
- Dr. Know – guitar, backing vocals, piano, organ
- Dave Id – backing vocals on "Destroy Babylon" and "Coptic Times"
