= It's About Luv =

Studio album by H.R.
- Released: 1985, 1987
- Genres: Hardcore punk, reggae
- Labels: Olive Tree Records, SST
- Producer: Daniel Rey

It's About Luv is the first solo album by Bad Brains lead singer H.R. (the band is also known as Human Rights). It was first released as an LP by Olive Tree Records (H.R.'s own label) in 1985 and reissued in 1986 by SST Records (#SST 179).

== Overview ==
This album consists of reggae, hardcore punk and jazz-funk songs. It was released after the first break up of the Bad Brains following a European Tour.

The cover art of It's About Luv shows the lion of Judah, the star of David, and pot leaves, that express H.R. Rastafari beliefs.

== Track listing ==
1. Roots
2. It'll Be Alright
3. We're Gonna Get You / Heaven Forbid
4. Let's Have A Revolution
5. Who Loves You Girl?
6. It's About Luv
7. Happy Birthday My Son
8. Free Our Mind

== Personnel ==
- Vocals - H.R.
- Guitar - David Jordan
- Drums - Earl Hudson
- Producer - David Byers
- Bass Guitar - Jose Juda II Gonzalez

== Album release ==
- It's About Luv, LP, Olive Tree Records, #101, 1985.
- It's About Luv, LP, SST Records, #SST 179, 1987.
- It's About Luv, CD Mini, SST Records, #SST CD 179, 1987.
