= The Omega Sessions =

EP by Bad Brains
- Released: November 11, 1997
- Recorded: 1980
- Genre: Hardcore punk; roots reggae; dub
- Length: 15:50
- Label: Victory

Bad Brains chronology
Black Dots (1996)	The Omega Sessions (1997)	A Bad Brains Reunion Live from Maritime Hall (2001)

Professional ratings
Review scores
Source	Rating
Allmusic	link

The Omega Sessions is a 5-song EP recorded by American rock band Bad Brains in 1980 and released in 1997. The tracks were recorded and mixed at the original Omega Recording Studios in Rockville, Maryland. The EP contains early versions of songs that eventually appeared on later releases, including a rendition of "I Against I," which would not appear on an official Bad Brains release for another six years.

The demos were remastered in 1997 and released in November of that year by Victory Records. The EP was released on both compact disc and 10" record with limited pressings on red, gold, and green vinyl (1000 of each), as well as an even more limited 8" picture disc. All versions of the release included two previously unpublished photos by Glen E. Friedman from the time of the recording. The record’s design and handwriting were by Sean Bonner.

== Track listing ==
1. "I Against I"
2. "Stay Close to Me"
3. "I Luv I Jah"
4. "At the Movies"
5. "Attitude"

== Personnel ==
- H.R. – vocals
- Dr. Know – guitar
- Darryl Jenifer – bass
- Earl Hudson – drums
