= Passive Restraints =

EP by Clutch
- Released: April 1992
- Recorded: 1992
- Studio: Uncle Punchy Studios (Silver Spring, Maryland)
- Genre: Stoner rock, post-hardcore, alternative metal
- Length: 13:39
- Label: Earache Records
- Producer: Clutch, Larry Packer

Clutch chronology
| Pitchfork (1991) | Passive Restraints (1992) | Transnational Speedway League (1993) |

Professional ratings
Review scores
| Source | Rating |
|---|---|
| AllMusic | 3/5 stars |

Passive Restraints is the second EP by American rock band Clutch, released in April 1992 via Earache Records. A reissue called Impetus was released in 1997 with extra songs.

== Recording and release ==
It was a three-song EP with some early punk/metal tracks that don't make the live set list much anymore, though they were a good example of their influence by bands such as Bad Brains. Vocalist Neil Fallon stated, after hearing Bad Brains on their debut self-titled album, Bad Brains:

"..Upon listening though [to the album], I was totally confused. I had nothing to compare it to. It was freakish. But after repeated listens, there was that eureka moment, and ever since then they have been on the loftiest of rock pedestals"

== Background ==
The second EP from Clutch was also to become a rare find. It was released on CD and 12" vinyl, but according to Earache Records the 12" is no longer available. It was also the second album produced/engineered with Lawrence "Uncle Punchy" Packer at his studios in their home state of Maryland.

== Track listing ==
All tracks written by Clutch.

Side one
| No. | Title | Length |
|---|---|---|
| 1. | "Passive Restraints" | 3:03 |
| 2. | "Impetus" | 3:32 |

Side two
| No. | Title | Length |
|---|---|---|
| 1. | "High Caliber Consecrator" | 7:04 |
| Total length: | | 13:39 |

== Personnel ==
- Neil Fallon – vocals
- Tim Sult – guitar
- Dan Maines – bass
- Jean-Paul Gaster – drums

Production

- Produced by "Uncle Punchy" Lawrence Packer at Uncle Punchy Stoudios in Silver Spring, Maryland
