= Luicidal (album) =

Studio album by Luicidal
- Released: October 14, 2014
- Genre: Punk rock
- Label: DC-Jam

Luicidal chronology
Luicidal (2014)	Born in Venice (2018)

Luicidal is the debut album by the American punk rock band Luicidal, released on October 14, 2014.

== Overview ==
Luicidal features multiple musicians including three of the four members of the Join the Army era Suicidal Tendencies lineup (Louiche Mayorga, R.J. Herrera and Rocky George) as well as Grant Estes and Amery Smith, who played guitar and drums respectively on Suicidal Tendencies' 1983 self-titled debut album. Mike Muir is the only original member of Suicidal Tendencies who does not perform on the album. Luicidal also features guest vocals by H.R. (Bad Brains), Dale Henderson (Beowülf) and Keven Guercio (No Mercy).

== Reception ==
Luicidal has received mostly positive reviews. Rich Dodgin from All About The Rock said, "This is an album of old school punk rock, Venice Beach style, and an album that I'm going to have on repeat play for a long time to come."

== Track listing ==
No.	Title	Length
1.	"West Side Familia"	1:59
2.	"Live for Today"	2:19
3.	"Kumbaya"	3:20
4.	"Changed World"	3:44
5.	"You Always Knew"	0:58
6.	"Knife Fight"	2:40
7.	"Mexican Crabs"	1:36
8.	"Sinister Love"	1:35
9.	"Least to Succeed"	4:17
10.	"Green Light"	1:28
11.	"Killing Skating Machine"	2:01
12.	"Kumbaya" (featuring H.R.)	3:04

== Personnel ==
Luicidal

- Mando Ochoa – vocals
- Marty Ramirez – guitar
- Louiche Mayorga – bass
- R.J. Herrera – drums

Additional personnel

- Dale Henderson - vocals
- Keven Guercio - vocals
- H.R. - vocals
- Rocky George - guitar
- Grant Estes - guitar
- Amery Smith - drums
