= Jesus EP =

Jesus

EP by the Feederz
- Released: 1980
- Recorded: 1980
- Studio: Gila Monster Studios
- Genre: Punk rock
- Length: 9:42
- Label: Anxiety Records, Placebo Records
- Producer: The Feederz, David Albert

The Feederz chronology
Jesus (1980)	Ever Feel Like Killing Your Boss? (1984)

Jesus is the debut EP by Arizona punk band the Feederz. It was recorded cheaply in their home state of Arizona and released in 1980 through Anxiety Records. It was reissued in 1983 on Placebo Records with a different sleeve. The EP generally received positive reviews. The title track (with the expanded title "Jesus Entering from the Rear") later appeared on the classic Let Them Eat Jellybeans! compilation, issued in 1981 on Alternative Tentacles. Later band releases are simply credited to "Feederz".

== Track listing ==
All tracks are written by Frank Discussion.

No.	Title	Length
1.	"Jesus"	3:07
2.	"Stop You're Killing Me"	1:53
3.	"Avon Lady"	1:38
4.	"Terrorist"	3:04
Total length:		9:42

== Personnel ==
=== Band ===
- Frank Discussion - vocals, guitar
- Clear Bob - bass
- Art Nouveau - drums

=== Technical ===
- David Albert, The Feederz - production
