= Luicidal =

American punk rock band

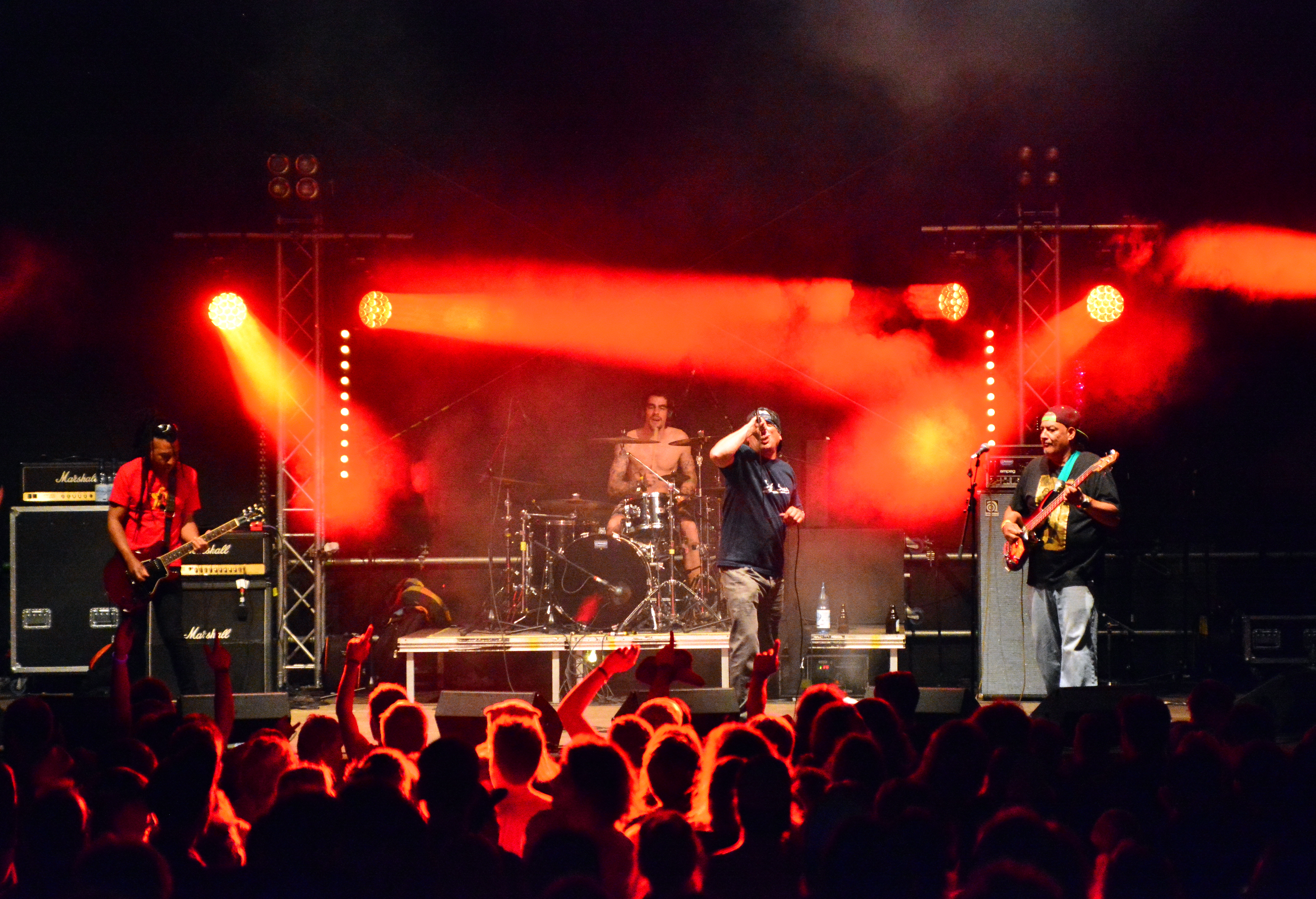
- Luicidal in 2015

Background information
- Origin: Venice, California, U.S.
- Genre: Punk rock
- Years active: 2012–present
- Labels: DC-Jam, Cleopatra
- Members: Mando Ochoa; Louichi Mayorga; Mike Clark; Rocky George; R.J. Herrera
- Past members: Ricky Reynaga Marty Ramirez Vince Sollecito
- Website: luicidal.com

Luicidal is a punk rock band from Venice, Los Angeles, California, formed in 2012. The band consists mostly of former members of Suicidal Tendencies, advertising themselves as "The OGs of Suicidal Tendencies".

== Band history ==
Bassist Louiche Mayorga decided to form Luicidal with his former Suicidal Tendencies bandmate R.J. Herrera after stating he missed "being on the stage as an artist". In order to put the band together, they were joined by Mando Ochoa (Sick Sense) on vocals and Ricky Reynaga (Rated X, Rolling Papers and Sancho's Revenge) on guitar. Luicidal performs songs from Suicidal Tendencies' first three studio albums, Suicidal Tendencies, Join the Army and How Will I Laugh Tomorrow When I Can't Even Smile Today; the first two featured Mayorga on bass, while the last two featured Herrera on drums.

Luicidal released their debut album Luicidal on October 14, 2014, on DC-Jam Records. Mayorga has described the musical direction as "badass like the 80's style Suicidal music." Luicidal features guest appearances by former Suicidal Tendencies members Rocky George, Grant Estes and Amery Smith as well as H.R. of the Bad Brains and Dale Henderson of Beowülf. Luicidal has received strong praise from the media. Rich Dodgin from All About The Rock said "This is an album of old school punk rock, Venice Beach style, and an album that I'm going to have on repeat play for a long time to come". Luicidal promoted the album with a U.S. and European tour. By early 2016, Herrera had left the band and was replaced by Vince Sollecito.

Luicidal released their second album Born in Venice on October 12, 2018, on Cleopatra Records.

== Discography ==
- Luicidal (2014)
- Born in Venice (2018)
