= God of Love (album) =

Studio album by Bad Brains
- Released: May 23, 1995
- Genre: Alternative metal; reggae; hardcore punk
- Length: 47:50
- Label: Maverick
- Producer: Ric Ocasek

Bad Brains chronology
Rise (1993)	God of Love (1995)	Black Dots (1996)

Professional ratings
Review scores
Source	Rating
AllMusic	2/5 stars
The Encyclopedia of Popular Music	3/5 stars
Entertainment Weekly	A−
Punknews.org	3.5/5 stars
Rolling Stone	3/5 stars
Spin	7/10 stars

God of Love is the sixth studio album by American rock band Bad Brains. It is the band's first album since I Against I, released in 1986, with its original lineup. It was released in 1995 on Maverick Records.

The release contains their usual mix of hardcore punk/metal and reggae, though with more the latter than any other Bad Brains album. The heavy-rock oriented title track received video airplay on MTV.

Backed by huge promotion from the label and an opening slot on the Beastie Boys' Ill Communication tour, the band fell apart as the volatile singer, H.R., was arrested several times; he was involved in beating a skinhead, a security guard, and the band's manager in separate incidents during the tour. The band missed a performance at Madison Square Garden with Beastie Boys due to H.R.'s behavior, leading to yet another breakup. The band reunited in 1997.

This album was re-released on Record Store Day, April 16, 2011, as only 2,000 copies along with a 7".

== Track listing ==
All tracks are written by Paul Hudson, Gary Miller, and Darryl Jenifer.

No.	Title	Length
1.	"Cool Mountaineer"	3:23
2.	"Justice Keepers"	3:14
3.	"Long Time"	4:46
4.	"Rights of a Child"	4:27
5.	"God of Love"	2:43
6.	"Over the Water"	4:23
7.	"Tongue Tee Tie"	2:51
8.	"Darling I Need You"	2:35
9.	"To the Heavens"	4:24
10.	"Thank Jah"	3:34
11.	"Big Fun"	5:09
12.	"How I Love Thee"	6:21

== Personnel ==
Bad Brains

- H.R. – vocals
- Dr. Know – guitar
- Darryl Jenifer – bass
- Earl Hudson – drums

Production

- Christopher Shaw – engineer
- Ric Ocasek – producer
