= DC-Jam Records =

- Founded: 2006
- Founder: Darron Hemann
- Genre: Punk, hardcore, ska
- Country of origin: U.S.
- Location: Springfield, Missouri
- Official website: www.dcjamrecords.com

DC-Jam Records is a Midwest American record label founded in 2006 by Darron Hemann that focuses primarily on punk rock, ska, and experimental music. The label features well-known classic punk rock artists such as T.S.O.L., JFA, Fishbone, Meat Puppets, Richie Ramone, The Adicts, Down By Law, Ultrabomb, Trusty, and Government Issue, and several others including The Soviet Machines, Porcupine, The Ragged Jubilee, Onward, etc., Luicidal, Dirty Filthy Mugs, The Generators, Kirkwood Dellinger Downtown Brown, and Fast Piece of Furniture (featuring Jeff Nelson of Dischord Records and Minor Threat).

== Discography ==
- Ultrabomb Dying to Smile LP & CD
- Ultrabomb Time to Burn LP & CD
- 16 Hi-Fi Hits Compilation LP
- Meat Puppets “Live in Manchester England” LP Picture Disc
- The Soviet Machines LP
- #Goals CD
- Porcupine “What You’ve Heard Isn’t Real” EP & CD
- Porcupine “Carrier Wave” LP & CD
- The Adicts All The Young Droogs CD & LP
- Fishbone Crazy Glue LP & CD
- Fishbone Live PIC DISC LP x2
- Government Issue The Punk Remains The Same CD & 7"
- JFA Speed of Sound CD
- JFA To All Our Friends CD & LP
- T.S.O.L. Life Liberty & the Pursuit of Free Downloads PIC DISC LP
- Dirty Filthy Mugs All Yobs In CD & PIC DISC LP
- Dirty Filthy Mugs Bodkin Downs 7"
- Dirty Filthy Mugs Up in The Downs CD
- 300 Pounds Trail of Numbered Days CD
- Downtown Brown Grabbleton Beach CD
- Downtown Brown “2001-2011” CD
- Downtown Brown “Masterz of the Universe” LP & CD
- Fast Piece of Furniture Adventures in Contentment LP
- Frontside Five Resurrection Cemetery CD
- Luicidal LP & CD
- The Heard Genesis CD
- Kirkwood Dellinger Gold CD
- Machine 22 Off The Record CD
- Minus One The Kids Don't Skate Here CD
- Minus One “No Sign of Angels” CD
- Minus One “Anthems of Byzanthium, The Early Years ‘81-‘86” CD
- Fishbone & Slightly Stoopid Split 7”
- Neon Wilderness (band)|Neon Wilderness Pure Power CD
- Painted Willie Mind Bowling CD
- Onward, etc. “Sonder On” CD
- The Rudy Schwartz Project Bowling for Appliances CD
- The Rudy Schwartz Project Delicious Ass Frenzy CD
- The Rudy Schwartz Project “Winter Dance of the Koala Sperm Harvest” CD
- The Rudy Schwartz Project “Full Frontal Klugman” CD
- The Rudy Schwartz Project “Don’t Get Charred...Get Puffy!” CD
- The Rudy Schwartz Project “Salmon Dave” CD
- The Rudy Schwartz Project Remembering a Summertime Rash CD
- The Rudy Schwartz Project The Year They Switched to Cornmeal CD
- Trusty Demo CD
- Venomous Preserved Emergencies CD
- The Generators Last of The Pariahs CD
- Richie Ramone Entitled CD & LP
- Richie Ramone “Cellophane” CD & LP

== Compilations ==
- Various “DC-Jam Skate Rock Vol.1” CD X2
- Various “17 Hi-Fi Hits” LP
