= Sid McCray =

American singer (1957–2020)

- Born: July 3, 1957
- Died: September 9, 2020 (aged 63)
- Genres: Punk rock; jazz fusion
- Occupation: Singer

Sidney Alexander McCray (July 3, 1957 – September 9, 2020) was an American punk singer.

== Biography ==
McCray was born into a military family which moved to Washington, D.C. in 1968, following the assassination of Martin Luther King Jr. In the 1970s, he met Darryl Jenifer, with whom he shared his knowledge and passion for music.

In 1977, McCray returned to Washington to create Mind Power, a jazz fusion group in succession of Return to Forever, Chick Corea, Mahavishnu Orchestra, and John McLaughlin. McCray was lead singer of this group. The group also included Dr. Know on guitar, Darryl Jenifer on bass, and Earl Hudson on drums. The band name was inspired by Success Through a Positive Mental Attitude by Napoleon Hill. The first concert took place in Hudson's basement.

In 1978, many punk rock bands were beginning to form, such as The Dickies, the Dead Boys, and the Sex Pistols. The band renamed themselves the Bad Brains after the song "Bad Brain" on the fourth album of the Ramones, titled Road to Ruin. In 1979, McCray was replaced by singer H.R., brother of drummer Earl Hudson, and the group evolved into reggae. However, McCray would continue to accompany the group on tour.

Sid McCray died on September 9, 2020.

== Filmography ==
- American Hardcore (2006)
- Punk the Capital: Building a Sound Movement (2019)
