= The Hour of Reprisal =

Studio album by Ill Bill
- Released: September 16, 2008
- Recorded: 2006–2008
- Genre: Hardcore hip-hop
- Length: 59:53
- Label: Uncle Howie; Fat Beats
- Producer: Cynic; Darp Malone; DJ Lethal; DJ Muggs; DJ Premier; Ill Bill; Necro; Sicknature; T-Ray

Ill Bill chronology
What's Wrong with Bill? (2004)	The Hour of Reprisal (2008)	Kill Devil Hills (2010)

Professional ratings
Review scores
Source	Rating
AllMusic	1.5/5 stars
Consequence Of Sound	C+
HipHopDX	4/5
RapReviews	8.5/10
Sputnikmusic	3.5/5

The Hour of Reprisal is the second studio album by American rapper and record producer Ill Bill. It was released on September 16, 2008, by Uncle Howie Records and Fat Beats Records. Production was handled by DJ Muggs, Necro, Sicknature, Cynic, Darp Malone, DJ Lethal, DJ Premier, T-Ray, and Ill Bill himself, who also served as executive producer. It features guest appearances from Everlast, B-Real, Darryl Jenifer, HERO, Howard Jones, H.R., Immortal Technique, Max Cavalera, Necro, Raekwon, Slaine, Tech N9ne and Vinnie Paz.

The album debuted at number 67 on the Top R&B/Hip-Hop Albums, number 40 on the Independent Albums and number 13 on the Heatseekers Albums charts in the United States.

It was included in HipHopDX's 'Top 25 Hip Hop Albums of 2008' list. DJ Premier also included the album in his personal 'Top 20 Albums of 2008' list, ranking it at No. 20

== Track listing ==
#	Title	Producer(s)	Performer(s)
1	"Babylon"	T-Ray	Verses: Ill Bill; Chorus: Howard Jones
2	"Doomsday Was Written in an Alien Bible"	Ill Bill	Ill Bill
3	"Trust Nobody"	Ill Bill	Ill Bill
4	"A Bullet Never Lies"	DJ Lethal	First Verse/Chorus: Ill Bill; Second Verse: Vinnie Paz
5	"White Nigger"	Ill Bill	Ill Bill
6	"My Uncle"	Ill Bill; Sicknature	Ill Bill
7	"Riya"	Ill Bill	Verses: Ill Bill; Chorus: H.R.; Bass: Darryl Jenifer
8	"War Is My Destiny"	Ill Bill	First Verse: Ill Bill; Second Verse: Immortal Technique; Chorus: Max Cavalera
9	"Society Is Brainwashed"	DJ Premier	Ill Bill
10	"This Is Who I Am"	DJ Muggs	Ill Bill
11	"Too Young"	Darp Malone	First Verse: E-Dot (of HERO); Second Verse: Ill Bill; Third Verse: Slaine; Chorus: Darp Malone (of HERO)
12	"Pain Gang"	Cynic	Intro: Howie Tenenbaum; First Verse: B-Real; Second Verse: Everlast; Third Verse/Chorus: Ill Bill
13	"U.B.S. (Unauthorized Biography of Slayer)"	Necro	Ill Bill
14	"Coka Moschiach"	Ill Bill	First Verse/Chorus: Ill Bill; Intro/Second Verse: Raekwon
15	"The Most Dangerous Weapon Alive"	Necro	Ill Bill
16	"Soap" (skit)	Ill Bill	
17	"I'm a Goon"	Ill Bill; Sicknature	Ill Bill
18	"Only Time Will Tell"	DJ Muggs	First Verse: Necro; Second Verse: Tech N9ne; Third Verse: Ill Bill; Chorus: Everlast

== Personnel ==
- William "Ill Bill" Braunstein – vocals, producer (tracks: 2, 3, 5–8, 14, 16, 17), recording (tracks: 1, 13), mixing (tracks: 1–8, 11–15, 17), executive producer
- Howard Jones – vocals (track 1)
- Anthony "Q-Unique" Quiles – voice (track 1)
- Vincenzo "Vinnie Paz" Luvineri – vocals (track 4)
- Paul D. "H.R." Hudson – vocals (track 7)
- Felipe "Immortal Technique" Coronel – vocals (track 8)
- Max Cavalera – vocals (track 8)
- Errol "E-Dot" Henry – vocals (track 11)
- George "Slaine" Carroll – vocals (track 11)
- Justin "Darp Malone" Ryan – vocals & producer (track 11)
- Louis "B-Real" Freese – vocals (track 12)
- Erik "Everlast" Schrody – vocals (tracks: 12, 18)
- Howie Tenenbaum – voice (track 12)
- Corey "Raekwon" Woods – vocals (track 14)
- Ron "Necro" Braunstein – vocals (track 18), producer (tracks: 13, 15)
- Aaron "Tech N9ne" Yates – vocals (track 18)
- Eric "DJ Eclipse" Winn – scratches (tracks: 3, 17), recording (tracks: 2, 9)
- Darryl Jenifer – bass (track 7)
- Christopher "DJ Premier" Martin – scratches, producer & mixing (track 9)
- St. Louis – keyboards (track 12)
- Lawrence "DJ Muggs" Muggerud – scratches (track 18), producer & mixing (tracks: 10, 18)
- Todd Ray – producer, recording & mixing (track 1)
- Leor "DJ Lethal" Dimant – producer (track 4), recording (track 7)
- Jeppe "Sicknature" Andersen – producer (tracks: 6, 17)
- Richard "Cynic" Alfaro – producer (track 12)
- Carlos Bess – recording (tracks: 1, 18), mixing (tracks: 1–8, 11, 12, 14, 15, 17)
- Anton Pukshansky – recording & mixing (track 1)
- Elliott Thomas – recording (tracks: 3–6, 8, 10–15, 17)
- Jeff Abell – recording & mixing (track 16)
- Larry Lachmann – mastering
- Lawrence Carroll – artwork
- Donna McLeer – artwork graphics, layout
- Eden Braunstein – photography
- Mike McRath – photography
- Howie Abrams – A&R, management
- Kenny Gabor – management
- Vaughn Lewis – management

== Charts ==
Chart (2008)	Peak position
US Top R&B/Hip-Hop Albums (Billboard)	67
US Independent Albums (Billboard)	40
US Heatseekers Albums (Billboard)	13
