= Quickness =

Studio album by Bad Brains
- Released: September 14, 1989
- Genre: Groove metal
- Length: 33:52
- Label: Caroline
- Producer: Ron St. Germain

Bad Brains chronology
Live (1988)	Quickness (1989)	The Youth Are Getting Restless (1990)

Quickness (also known as With the Quickness) is the fourth full-length album by the American rock band Bad Brains. At the time of its release, it was the best selling Bad Brains album and also featured an MTV video for the lead-off track "Soul Craft" directed by Paul Rachman who later went on to produce and direct the feature documentary American Hardcore. Drummer Earl Hudson, though pictured on the cover, does not play on the record, as drum parts were instead performed by Mackie Jayson of the Cro-Mags. In an interview with MTV, guitarist Dr. Know said that the album's title comes from urgency and swiftness.

== Musical style ==
Quickness was a crossover release that contained elements of several genres, including funk, hip hop, heavy metal, punk, and reggae, which made a notable return after being absent from its predecessor I Against I (1986). It has also been described as one of the first groove metal albums, being released a year before Prong's Beg to Differ and Pantera's Cowboys from Hell.

== Critical reception ==
Professional ratings
Review scores
Source	Rating
AllMusic	3/5 stars
Christgau's Record Guide	C+

Dave E. Henderson of Music Week considered that with this album the band "should finally achieve greater notoriety". But on the other hand it is losing its identity while presenting "frenetic punk-metal with all the growling cliches from years gone by" instead of previous mix of reggae and punk.

== Controversy ==
One of the songs on Quickness, "Don't Blow Bubbles", had lyrics that were criticized as homophobic for suggesting AIDS was God's punishment for homosexuality. In a 2007 interview where bassist Darryl Jenifer called their previous views "ignorant", he was asked about the song and the furor over the lyrics and replied "They don't understand that we've grown. Just like anyone, I'm not ashamed to say, 'Maybe I could have been…' Damn right, I was a homophobe! I shouldn't have to explain that to the world because everyone will do that. That's wisdom. You have to grow to be wise." On the 2022 reissue of the album, an instrumental version of "Don't Blow Bubbles" was included in place of the original version, with the song's title changed to "Instrumental".

== Track listing ==
1. "Soul Craft" (Miller, Jenifer, Hudson)
2. "Voyage Into Infinity" (Miller, Jenifer, Hudson)
3. "The Messengers" (Miller, Hudson, Hahn)
4. "With the Quickness" (Miller, Jenifer, Hudson)
5. "Gene Machine/Don't Bother Me" (Miller, Jenifer, Hudson)
6. "Don't Blow Bubbles" (Miller, Jenifer, Hudson)
7. "Sheba" (Miller, Hudson)
8. "Yout' Juice" (Miller, Jenifer, Hudson)
9. "No Conditions" (Miller, Jenifer, Hudson)
10. "Silent Tears" (Jenifer, Hudson)
11. "The Prophet's Eye" (Miller, Jenifer, Hudson)
12. "Endtro" (Miller, Jenifer)

== Personnel ==
Bad Brains

- H.R. – vocals
- Dr. Know – guitar
- Darryl Jenifer – bass
- Earl Hudson – drums (credited, but does not appear on album)

Additional musicians

- Mackie Jayson – session drummer
