= Let Them Eat Jellybeans! =

1981 hardcore punk compilation album

Compilation album by Various Artists
- Released: 1981
- Recorded: Various Dates
- Genre: Hardcore punk
- Length: 37:43
- Label: Alternative Tentacles
- Producer: Jello Biafra

Professional ratings
Review scores
Source	Rating
AllMusic	4.5/5 stars

Let Them Eat Jellybeans!, subtitled "17 Extracts From America's Darker Side", is a compilation album released by Jello Biafra's Alternative Tentacles in 1981. It was one of the earliest compilations of underground music in the United States and its original release included an insert of all of the punk bands known to be playing in the U.S. and Canada at that time. The first side of the LP features songs by a number of bands that formed the canon of American hardcore punk in the 1980s, while the second side features more of an art rock sound.

The album's title comes from the phrase "Let them eat cake" (supposedly said by Marie Antoinette). The use of the word jellybeans is in reference to Ronald Reagan, who was known to consider them his favorite candy.

At least two of the cuts on the punk side of the album have never been issued in the same form heard on Let Them Eat Jellybeans!. The version of Black Flag's "Police Story" heard on ...Jellybeans! was recorded during the sessions for the Six Pack EP and features Dez Cadena on lead vocals, although the album's insert features the then-current Damaged-era lineup with Henry Rollins. Also, the version of Dead Kennedys' "Nazi Punks Fuck Off!" is a wholly different recording than the versions heard on both In God We Trust, Inc. and the "Nazi Punks Fuck Off!" single. The version of Bad Brains' "Pay to Cum" is the original version first heard on their self-released 7" single, and differs from the version on their self-titled debut album.

According to Alternative Tentacles, it has not reissued the album because Black Flag would not give permission to use their track and because there has been "a falling out" between Biafra and another unnamed band on the record. Biafra would not re-release the album unless it is in its full, original form. Despite this, the album has been in widespread circulation on peer to peer file sharing networks and on the internet, plus used copies can be found in record stores.

== Track listing ==
Side A
No.	Title	Band	Length
1.	"Ha Ha Ha"	Flipper	2:19
2.	"The Prisoner"	D.O.A.	1:53
3.	"Police Story"	Black Flag	1:33
4.	"Pay to Cum"	Bad Brains	1:26
5.	"Nazi Punks Fuck Off"	Dead Kennedys	1:03
6.	"Paid Vacation"	Circle Jerks	1:29
7.	"Prostitution"	Really Red	1:21
8.	"Jesus Entering from the Rear"	The Feederz	3:08
9.	"Slave to My Dick"	Subhumans	2:38

Side B
No.	Title	Band	Length
10.	"Isotope Soap"	Geza X	2:22
11.	"Persecution, That's My Song"	BPeople	2:15
12.	"An Object"	Wounds	2:40
13.	"Everyone's A Bigot"	The Offs	4:33
14.	"Corporate Food"	Anonymous (Steve Fisk)	2:22
15.	"Fun Again"	Half Japanese	1:56
16.	"Joke's On You"	Christian Lunch	3:31
17.	"Sleep"	Voice Farm	2:50
Total length:			37:43

== Reception ==
In The Boston Phoenix, critic Doug Simmons wrote that "The LP divides roughly by sides. Side one comprises unadulterated hard-core — clawing guitars, a tuneless, yowling, generally unintelligible singer, and an amphetamined 4/4 beat. Side two is arty, a word that generally causes punks to scowl....Side two is harder to listen to because its sounds and styles are not nearly as unified. Not one of the songs subscribes to straightahead hard-core, but with few exceptions they're all good."

== See also ==
- List of punk compilation albums
- Ronald Reagan in music
