= The Feederz =

Punk rock band

Feederz
- Origin: Arizona, United States
- Genres: Punk rock, hardcore punk
- Years active: 1978–1987, 2002–2004, 2017–present
- Labels: Anxiety Records, Placebo Records, Flaming Banker, Broken Rekids, Slope Records
- Members: Frank Discussion; Clear Bob (Dan Clark)
- Past members: Art Nouveau (John Vivier); Mark Roderick; Jayed Scotti; Ben Wah; Denmark Vese; Brant Bolling; D.H Peligro
- Website: http://www.feederz.org/

The Feederz are a punk rock band, originally from Arizona. They are known for their controversial song "Jesus" (a.k.a. "Jesus Entering from the Rear"), which was featured on Alternative Tentacles' infamous Let Them Eat Jellybeans! compilation, and for their provocative album covers. The Feederz have strong Situationist tendencies, verging into communism and anarchism. Their songs were highly critical of government, consumerism and religion.

Lead singer Frank Discussion is also known for his "subvertisements" or "derailments", an adaptation of the situationist tactic of detournement, as well as what he calls "interventions" whereby one detournes physical events by intervening with an out-of-place element in the physical world, a tactic expressed as simply as placing disparate items in unsuspecting people's shopping carts, thereby raising the action beyond the level of mere prank to a conscious tactic used to undermine society and to express a unified critique of it. He is also known for being one of the developers of "antistasiology", along with Tara Humara, defined as the comparative study of various types of tactics, strategies and organizational structures used by various resistance movements, historically and currently.

== History ==
Frank Discussion and Clear Bob (Dan Clark) formed the Feederz in 1977. Art Nouveau (John Vivier) later joined as a drummer. Before performing publicly, the Feederz issued a press release that the local media mistook as a terrorist communique. At their first show, Discussion caused a panic by firing blanks from an AR-15 rifle into the audience. In 1980, the band released their first recording, the four-song EP Jesus.

In 1982, Discussion wrote "Bored with School", a diatribe against school and work posing as an announcement from the Arizona Department of Education, and distributed 5,000 copies to local high schools. He fled Arizona to escape arrest for this incident and settled in San Francisco.

Clark later recorded with Eddy Detroit and Victory Acres/Joke Flower.

The Jesus EP was reissued in 1983 by Placebo Records.

In 1984, Discussion reformed Feederz with Mark Roderick (credited as "Mark Edible") and D.H. Peligro (as "Darrin Henley"), with whom he recorded Ever Feel Like Killing Your Boss?. In Situationist style, the album sleeve was covered in sandpaper. In 1986, Teachers in Space was released, with Jayed Scotti replacing Peligro on drums. Scotti, a partner of Winston Smith, created album art for bands such as the Dead Kennedys, MDC and Crucifucks. The cover of Teachers in Space featured a photo of the Challenger disaster. Later in the decade, Discussion again disbanded the Feederz, but by then their orbit of influence had expanded, including Kurt Cobain among their fans. A fan's post to the Nirvana newsgroup, alt.music.nirvana, revealed that Cobain had taken a bumper sticker from the Feederz' Teachers in Space LP and stuck it on his all-black Fender Stratocaster, made famous at the 1991 Reading Festival in England, where Nirvana performed with Sonic Youth. The sticker read: "Vandalism: Beautiful as a rock in a cop's face". In small type underneath were these words: "Courtesy of Feederz: Office of Anti-Public Relations". (This bumper sticker message would become the title of Feederz' comeback release more than a decade later.) Cobain's use of this guitar in the 1991: The Year Punk Broke film later that year indirectly lent even more exposure to the Feederz (until Cobain smashed it into pieces at a Paris show the following spring).

Feederz reformed in 2002 and released Vandalism: Beautiful as a Rock in a Cop's Face, engineered by Jack Endino. This lineup included Ben Wah on drums and Denmark Vesey on bass, both from Seattle. They toured throughout 2003. Discussion and Wah both relocated to Los Angeles in 2003-2004, and continued the band, playing with bassist Brant Boling, until 2007, when they played their last show at Mondo-Video-A-Go-Go.

In 2017, Feederz once again reformed, with Discussion joined by early members Clark and Peligro. The trio recorded four songs with producer Cris Kirkwood of Meat Puppets, two of which were released by Slope Records on April 15 as the WWHD: What Would Hitler Do? EP.

As of December 2023, Feederz began to release material from the 2017 album recordings. They are in the process of recording new material and re-recording some the parts they weren’t satisfied with.

== Discography ==
=== Studio albums ===
- Ever Feel Like Killing Your Boss? (1983, Flaming Banker)
- Teachers in Space (1986, Flaming Banker)
- Vandalism: Beautiful As a Rock in a Cop's Face (2002, Broken Rekids)

=== EPs ===
- Jesus (1980, Anxiety Records)
- WWHD: What Would Hitler Do? (2017, Slope Records)

=== Compilation appearances ===
- "Jesus Entering from the Rear" on Let Them Eat Jellybeans! (1981, Alternative Tentacles)
