= Bad Brains (album) =

Studio album by Bad Brains
- Released: February 5, 1982
- Recorded: May 16, 1981; August–October 1981
- Studios: 171-A, New York, New York
- Genres: Hardcore punk; reggae fusion
- Length: 33:56
- Label: ROIR
- Producer: Jay Dublee

Bad Brains chronology
Bad Brains (1982)	Rock for Light (1983)

Alternate cover art
- 1989 reissue as Attitude: The ROIR Sessions.

Singles from Bad Brains
- 1. "Pay to Cum" Released: June 1980; 2. "Sailin' On" Released: 1982

Bad Brains (also known as The Yellow Tape or Attitude: The ROIR Sessions) is the debut studio album by American rock band Bad Brains. Recorded in 1981 and released on the cassette-only label ROIR on February 5, 1982, many fans refer to it as "The Yellow Tape" because of its yellow packaging.

== Background and recording ==
In 1979, Bad Brains recorded the 16-song Black Dots album project, and the 5-song Omega Sessions EP project was recorded in 1980, but these efforts were shelved, except for a single released as "Pay to Cum" in mid-1980. The band had no album out. After being banned from all the major clubs in their hometown of Washington, DC, Bad Brains moved to New York City in 1981. In addition to their regular gigs at CBGB's, the band frequented Jerry Williams' 171-A Studios in Alphabet City. Named for its location between 10th and 11th Streets on Avenue A, 171-A was a 60-foot room with a stage at one end and an elevated sound-proof booth at the other. When the Bad Brains played a gig at 171-A in May 1981, Williams recorded it on reel-to-reel tape. The band liked the sound and returned to 171-A to record between August and October 1981. 12 of the 15 tracks on the album came from these sessions, while "Jah Calling", "Pay to Cum" and "I Luv I Jah", were from Williams' live recording in May.

== Music ==
The music on Bad Brains has been characterized as "a quick-fire half hour of chaotic drums and scratchy, blown-out guitars."

== Release ==
Bad Brains was originally released on February 5, 1982, in cassette-only format (Note: ROIR #A106) on Reachout International Records (ROIR). The cover art depicts DC's Capitol Building being struck by a bolt of lightning. The original cover art, (created by seminal zinester/skatepunk/icon Donna Lee Parsons) unfolded to include a photo of the band, album credits, lyrics to all the songs, and liner notes by then New York Rocker and Soho News critic Ira Kaplan, who would later front the band Yo La Tengo. Rather than label the tape's sides A/B or one/two, the band designated them Side 1/Side A.

The original edition of the cassette had a white spine on the J-card and a red or yellow cassette shell. Subsequent editions had an all-yellow J-card with either red, gold, or green cassette shells, in a nod toward the band's Rastafarian leanings. Later versions appeared in solid white, solid orange, solid yellow and transparent red tape shells. Because the yellow cassette shell was most common and it came in a matching yellow package, many fans referred to it as "The Yellow Tape".

=== Bad Brains EP ===
In 1981 the Dead Kennedys' record label Alternative Tentacles opened an office in the United Kingdom to issue special editions of records by American punk bands for the UK market. The single version of "Pay to Cum" had appeared on the Alternative Tentacles compilation Let Them Eat Jellybeans! and with the ROIR sessions available, a few songs were selected for a 1982 UK release as a 12-inch EP. The record's sleeve featured the same lightning-strikes-the-Capitol art that appeared on the ROIR cassette, and the back cover had the inner J-card's band photo, credits, lyrics, and Kaplan's liner notes. The record also mimicked the tape's Side 1/Side A aesthetic, differing in that one side was reggae and the other hardcore punk, unlike the cassette, which interspersed the two genres. Because Alternative Tentacles UK was a short-lived venture, the Bad Brains EP is rare, and for eight years was the only appearance of these songs on vinyl.

== Reception and influence ==
Retrospective professional ratings
Review scores
Source	Rating
AllMusic	5/5 stars
Christgau's Record Guide	B+
The Rolling Stone Album Guide	5/5 stars
Sounds	5/5 stars
Spin Alternative Record Guide	8/10

Reviewing for The Village Voice in 1982, Robert Christgau said, "Turn a fusion band into hardcore propheteers and you end up with fast heavy metal. The best kind for damn sure, especially since they turn their rage into Positive Mental Attitude. I like it fine. But great punks give up more than a salubrious blur."

The album was a crucial step in the evolution of hardcore punk and the eventual fusion of hard rock and reggae adopted later by bands like Sublime, Fishbone, and 311.

Adam Yauch of Beastie Boys was quoted as saying that this album is "the best punk/hardcore album of all time".

The album was inducted into the Decibel Hall of Fame in 2007.

Chuck Eddy wrote that Bad Brains "incorporated metal dynamics, Rastafari dub (for which they'd never again find a pocket as deep as the one here), and reckless R&B polypercussion. The last factor's the one they're rarely given credit for, but the first time I heard their manned collision 'Pay to Cum', the only great song they will ever record, I thought it sounded like the Buzzcocks produced by Chic. Only nastier, and noisier."

== Reissues ==
In 1989, In-Effect Records released a CD version, with the same track listing, titled Attitude: The ROIR Sessions. (Note: In-Effect #88561-3002-2).

The same year the first vinyl pressing of this was issued by the german label We Bite Records. The album uses the same alternative cover art as the In-Effect Records CD.

In 1990, Dutch East India Trading, through its imprint Homestead Records, was the first label to release the album on vinyl in the United States. (Note: Dutch East India Trading #DEI2001-1)

In 1996, ROIR reissued the original album on CD, featuring a hidden bonus track, followed by an on LP version the following year. (Note: ROIR #RUSLP 8223)

Bad Brains regained the rights to the album from ROIR in 2020, and reissued the album on vinyl, CD, yellow cassette and digital outlets on their own Bad Brains Records imprint via a pressing and distribution with ORG Music. A limited edition pressing of the album with Blue Note Records-inspired cover art and layout scheme, designed by former Alternative Tentacles graphic artist John Yates, was released at the same time as the original cover's reissue, on translucent green vinyl.

== Re-recordings ==
Many of the album's tracks were re-recorded for their 1983 follow-up, Rock for Light, with the exception of "Don't Need It", "The Regulator", "Jah Calling", "Leaving Babylon", "Pay to Cum", "I Luv I Jah". The instrumental final track on Bad Brains, titled "Intro", became the first nine seconds of Rock for Light's title song.

== Track listing ==
Side one
No.	Title	Length
1.	"Sailin' On"	1:55
2.	"Don't Need It"	1:07
3.	"Attitude"	1:19
4.	"The Regulator"	1:08
5.	"Banned in D.C."	2:12
6.	"Jah Calling"	2:31
7.	"Supertouch/Shitfit"	2:31
8.	"Leaving Babylon"	4:10

Side two
No.	Title	Length
9.	"Fearless Vampire Killers"	1:07
10.	"I"	2:05
11.	"Big Take Over"	2:57
12.	"Pay to Cum"	1:25
13.	"Right Brigade"	2:27
14.	"I Luv I Jah"	6:22
15.	"Intro"	0:45

1996 CD reissue hidden bonus track
No.	Title	Length
16.	"Jah the Conqueror"	2:11
Total length:		34:31

== Personnel ==
Bad Brains

- H.R. – lead vocals
- Dr. Know – guitar, backing vocals
- Darryl Jenifer – bass, backing vocals
- Earl Hudson – drums, backing vocals

Production

- Jay Dublee – producer, recording, mixing
- Bad Brains – mixing
- Wayne Vlcan – engineer
- Stanley Moskowitz – mastering
- Donna Parsons (from Ratcage) – cover art
- Ira Kaplan – liner notes
- Donnell Gibson; Jay Jones – logo design
- Laura Levine – photography
- Neil Cooper – cover concept
