= Bad Attitude =

Bad Attitude may refer to:

- Bad Attitude (album), a 1984 album by Meat Loaf
- Bad Attitude (Simply Slang album), a 2006 album by Simply Slang
- "Bad Attitude", a song by Honeymoon Suite from their 1985 album The Big Prize
- "Bad Attitude", a song by Deep Purple from their 1987 album The House of Blue Light
- "Bad Attitude", a song by Laura Branigan from her 1990 album Laura Branigan
- "Bad Attitude" (Girlfriend song), a 1992 single by Girlfriend
- "Bad Attitude", a song by Lisa Germano from her album Happiness
- Bad Attitude (professional wrestling), a name of several professional wrestling tag teams
- B.A. ("Bad Attitude") Baracus, a character played by Mr. T in the television series The A-Team
