= The Heard =

American garage rock band

Background information
- Origin: Longview, Texas, United States
- Genres: Garage rock; psychedelic rock
- Years active: 1965–1967
- Label: One-Way
- Past members: Andy Clendenen; Randy Clendenen; Billy Hazard; Bill Lewis; Jack Batman

The Heard was an American garage rock band formed in Longview, Texas, in 1965. Within a year of their formation, the band gained a reputation as one of the loudest musical acts in Texas, soon receiving a string of gigs at Houston's Catacomb Club. In 1967, the Heard recorded the "Exit 9" single, an enduring piece in the musical genre of psychedelic rock. The band's blend of frantic melodies and studio techniques unique to most garage groups has brought praise to "Exit 9" and its B-side cover version of "You're Gonna Miss Me".

== History ==
In 1965, twin brothers, Andy (rhythm guitar, vocals) and Randy Clendenen (lead guitar) formed the group with three fellow students from Longview High School—Billy Hazard (keyboards), Bill Lewis (bass guitar), and Jack Batman (drums). Although the prelude to the Heard's (they rejected the first proposal of performing under the moniker Johnny Apple and the Seeds) rise to popularity in East Texas are unknown, music historian Andy Brown notes the band made a major splash on the Texan garage band scene in mid-1966. After making appearances in rural and suburban regions, the band promoted to high-publicity gigs in Texas's metropolitan areas of Dallas, Austin, and Houston. Houston in particular brought the Heard the most visibility, as they enjoyed a residency at the Catacomb Club. Andy Clendenen recalled the stay, highlighted by a bill with the Five Americans began when the club's manager, Bob Cope, was impressed by the group's cover of the Kinks' song "You Really Got Me" at a local battle of the bands competition and the reaction from the audience that followed.

Looking to capitalize on their following, the Heard booked studio time at Robin Hood Brian's Studio in Tyler, Texas, where other garage acts like the Basement Wall (the single "Never Existed") also went to commit songs to record. A state of the art recording studio equipped with an 8-track tape recorder, the only tape of its kind in Texas at the time, and homemade mixing board was at the group's disposal, but only for a one-day session. Much to the band's disapproval, Hood insisted the Heard use a new electronic apparatus called the Cooper Time Cube—a tape-delay echo device which succeeded in adding a unique effect to the Clendenen brothers' song, "Exit 9", but also made Andy Clendenen's vocals nearly incomprehensible. Nonetheless, with Clendenen's frantic vocal performance and Lewis's bass replicating the sound of an electric jug, the composition is arguably one of the top Elevators-inspired songs of the era. Despite the rise of flower power in the 1960s, "Exit 9" was defiantly anti-counterculture, telling listeners to "Take your hippies and leave me, child".

The recording of "Exit 9" required all of the Heard's time in the studio, leaving the group with the problem of having no B-side for the single. Tight on time and finances, the band booked time at Steve Wright Studios for the following week. The band recorded a rendition of "You're Gonna Miss Me", a popular cover at the Heard's live performances. In June 1967, 500 copies of "Exit 9" were pressed on One-Way Records, and distributed at the group's gigs. The single was a number one hit in East Texas thanks to a local deejay's high-powered radio station playing the record to a wider audience. Late in 1967, the Heard disbanded when the band members graduated from high school.

Although public reaction to the group's single was indifferent at the time, "Exit 9" is now one of the most-revered recordings of Texas garage rock. The song appears on the compilation albums The Cicadelic Sixties and Texas Flashbacks, while the cover of "You're Gonna Miss Me" is featured on Songs We Taught the Fuzztones. In 2003, Break-a-Way Records released the Heard's recordings on an EP along with another Texan band the Only Ones.

In 2012, the compilation The Heard and the Music of The Clendenen Twins was released on CTR Records. The double disc release features all known Heard recordings on one disc and a collection of songs the Clendenen twins recorded in the 1970s on the other. The opening track on disc one is the original 1/2" master of "Exit 9", featuring an infamous toilet flush, which was left off of the original 1967 release.

== Discography ==
=== Single ===
- "Exit 9" b/w "You're Gonna Miss Me" – One-Way Records (0001), 1967

=== EP ===
- The Heard Meet the Only Ones – Break-a-Way Records (BREAK007), 2003

=== Album ===
- The Heard and the Music of The Clendenen Twins – CTR Records (CTR1001), 2012

=== EP ===
- Grinnin' In Your Face – Andrew Clendenen – BCLLC Records (BCLLC100), 2018

=== Album ===
- Cowboydelic – Andrew Clendenen – BCLLC Records (BCLLC101), 2019
- Idol Time-The Compilation – Andrew Clendenen – BCLLC Records (BCLLC102), 2025

=== Single ===
- Nobody Knows – Andrew Clendenen – BCLLC Records (BCLLC102), 2023

=== EP ===
- Ghost Chaser – Andrew Clendenen – BCLLC Records (BCLLC103), 2023

=== Single ===
- The Women Of My Life – Andrew Clendenen – BCLLC Records (BCLLC104), 2024

=== Single ===
- Winona's Wedding Remix – Andrew Clendenen – BCLLC Records (BCLLC105), 2024

=== Single ===
- The Couple – Andrew Clendenen – BCLLC Records (BCLLC106), 2025

=== Single ===
- Voodoo Dream – Andrew Clendenen – BCLLC Records (BCLLC106), 2026
