= I Against I =

Studio album by Bad Brains
- Released: November 21, 1986
- Recorded: 1986
- Studio: Long View Farm
- Genre: Hardcore punk
- Length: 31:53
- Label: SST (065)
- Producer: Ron Saint Germain

Bad Brains chronology
Rock for Light (1983)	I Against I (1986)	Live (1988)

Professional ratings
Review scores
Source	Rating
AllMusic	4.5/5 stars
Pitchfork	9.3/10
The Rolling Stone Album Guide	5/5 stars
Spin Alternative Record Guide	9/10
The Village Voice	B−

I Against I is the third studio album by American rock band Bad Brains. It was released on November 21, 1986 through SST Records with the catalog number SST 065. The best-selling album in the band's catalog, I Against I finds the band branching out from their early hardcore punk style to touch on funk, soul, reggae and heavy metal. It is also included in the book 1001 Albums You Must Hear Before You Die. The title track was a Paul Rachman-directed video (Rachman would go on to direct the documentary film American Hardcore).

The title I Against I presumably refers to the common Rastafarian phrase I and I, which is used in place of the first-person plural (i.e. we) to signify the union of the speaker, audience, and Jah (God) in love and peace.

At the producer's suggestion, the vocals to "Sacred Love" were recorded over the phone from the prison where H.R. was serving time on a marijuana distribution charge.

== Legacy ==
I Against I has influenced diverse rock artists. Ska punk band Sublime and its follow-up project, Sublime with Rome, frequently cover "House of Suffering" and bassist Eric Wilson said that I Against I inspired them to blend different genres. The Dillinger Escape Plan singer Greg Puciato named it one of the four albums that changed his life, as well as "a critical step" in shaping his vocal style. Max Cavalera of Sepultura states that the beginning of 1996 song "Straighthate" was probably inspired by "I Against I" since his band admired the Bad Brains. According to Harley Flanagan of the Cro-Mags, the verse riff in 1986's "The Age of Quarrel" was based on the last part of "I Against I". Tim Commerford of Rage Against the Machine mentioned the album as one of his biggest influences. Danko Jones called the title track "one of the greatest songs ever written as far as I'm concerned." Beppo of German punk band Spermbirds affirmed, "I Against I had a huge impact on us, they taught us that you can also be hard by playing slow."

"I Against I" was covered by Jeff Buckley in 1992, BoySetsFire and Brother's Keeper in 1999, and Lamb of God in 2018; "House of Suffering" has been covered by Sublime in 1995, Machine Head in 1999 and The Bled in 2005; "Let Me Help" was covered by Potshot in 2000; and "Sacred Love" was covered by Storm Large in 2014. In 2019, Bad Brains rerecorded the title track with rapper Denzel Curry as a guest vocalist for a Spotify single.

"Re-Ignition" has been sampled on "Daddy's Home" by Chubb Rock, "Ice Man Cometh" by 2 Black 2 Strong MMG, "Ultrasonic Sound" by Hive (which later appeared on The Matrix soundtrack), and on a remix of the 2004 song "Roll Call" by Lil Jon and Ice Cube. A live version of "Re-Ignition" was featured in Guitar Hero: Warriors of Rock. "Re-Ignition" appeared on a 2019 episode of Black Lightning. The Canadian teen drama Degrassi: The Next Generation, which names each episode after a 1980s song, named an episode after the song "I Against I".

== Track listing ==
All tracks are written by Paul Hudson, Darryl Jenifer, and Gary Miller, except where noted.

No.	Title	Writer(s)	Length
1.	"Intro"	Jenifer, Miller	1:02
2.	"I Against I"		2:50
3.	"House of Suffering"	Hudson, Miller	2:29
4.	"Re-Ignition"		4:16
5.	"Secret 77"		4:04
6.	"Let Me Help"		2:17
7.	"She's Calling You"	Hudson, Jenifer	3:42
8.	"Sacred Love"		3:40
9.	"Hired Gun"		3:45
10.	"Return to Heaven"		3:19

== Personnel ==
Bad Brains

- H.R. (Paul Hudson) – lead vocals
- Dr. Know (Gary Miller) – guitar
- Darryl Jenifer – bass
- Earl Hudson – drums

Production

- Ron Saint Germain – producer
- Phil Burnett – engineer
- Patch – mixing
- Jesse Henderson; Bill Ryan – assistant engineers
- Eddie Krupski; Dennis Mitchell – additional mixing
- Bob Ludwig – mastering
- Marcia Resnick – photography, cover concept
- Paul Bacon Studio – calligraphy and development

== Release history ==
Region	Date
United States	November 21, 1986
United Kingdom	February 1987

== Accolades ==
Year	Publication	Country	Accolade	Rank
1989	OOR	Netherlands	"The Best Albums of the 80s"	29
1995	Alternative Press	United States	"Top 99 Of '85 to '95"	9
1995	BigO	Singapore	"The 100 Best Albums from 1975 to 1995"	99
1999	Tylko Rock	Poland	"100 Albums that Shook Polish Rock"	39
2000	Terrorizer	United Kingdom	"100 Most Important Albums of the Eighties"	—
2002	Revolver	United States	"The 69 Greatest Metal Albums of All Time"	32
2003	Blender	United States	"500 CDs You Must Own Before You Die"	—
2004	Les Inrockuptibles	France	"50 Years of Rock'n'Roll"	—
2005	Robert Dimery	United States	1001 Albums You Must Hear Before You Die	—
2006	Gary Mulholland	United Kingdom	"261 Greatest Albums Since Punk and Disco"	—
2008	VOLUME	France	"200 Records that Changed the World"	—
2008	Tom Moon	United States	"1000 Recordings to Hear Before You Die"	—
2016	Loudwire	United States	"Top 80 Hard Rock + Metal Albums of the 1980s"	49
2016	Classic Rock	United Kingdom	"The 10 Essential Funk Rock Albums"	—
"—" denotes an unordered list.
