= Pay to Cum =

Single by Bad Brains

from the album Bad Brains
- B-side: "Stay Close to Me"
- Released: June 1980
- Recorded: December 1979 at Dots Studio in New York City
- Genre: Hardcore punk
- Length: 1:33
- Label: Bad Brain
- Songwriters: Paul Hudson, Dr. Know, Darryl Jenifer, Earl Hudson
- Producer: Jimi Quidd

Bad Brains singles chronology
"Pay to Cum" (1980)	"Sailin' On" (1982)

"Pay to Cum" is the debut single by Washington, D.C.–based hardcore punk band Bad Brains. It was released in June 1980 on Bad Brain Records. The single was recorded in New York City by Jimi Quidd at his Dots Studios.

The A-side to the original single was "Pay to Cum", while the flipside was "Stay Close to Me", identified as Side 1. The original 7" had no B-side or Side 2.

== Reception ==
Trouser Press called it a "memorable ... 1:33 of free-fire guitar rage" that established Bad Brains' "mastery" of hardcore punk.

In 2007, Filter magazine called it "one of the fastest, most furious songs ever recorded".

== Track listing ==
Side A

1. "Pay to Cum!" – 1:33

Side B

1. "Stay Close to Me" – 2:34

== In popular culture ==
The song was featured in the 1985 film After Hours, directed by Martin Scorsese. It was later featured during the opening credits of the 2006 documentary American Hardcore.

== Personnel ==
- H.R. – lead vocals
- Earl Hudson – drums
- Darryl Jenifer – bass
- Dr. Know – guitar

Production

- Jimi Quidd – producer
- Steve Horton, Reese Virgin – engineers, mixing
- Leigh Sioris – assistant engineer
- Bob Ludwig – mastering
- Charles Davis – front cover photo
- Paul Bishow – photography
