= Bad Brains =

American punk band

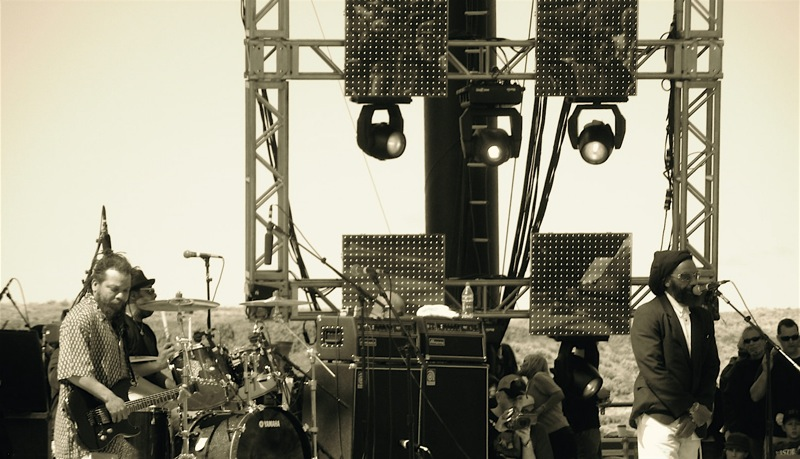
- Bad Brains at Sasquatch! Music Festival, 2007

Background information
- Also known as: Mind Power (1976–1979); Soul Brains (1998–2001)
- Origin: Washington, D.C., U.S.
- Genres: Hardcore punk; punk rock; heavy metal; reggae; jazz fusion (early)
- Works: Discography
- Years active: 1976–1995; 1998–present
- Labels: ROIR; Caroline; SST; Epic; SME; Maverick; Warner Bros.; Megaforce; Alternative Tentacles
- Members: Dr. Know; Darryl Jenifer; H.R.; Earl Hudson
- Past members: Sid McCray; Mackie Jayson; Taj Singleton; Chuck Mosley; Israel Joseph I; Chuck Treece; Jesse Royal
- Website: badbrains.com
- Logo
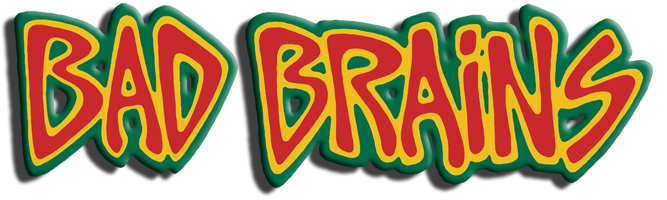

Bad Brains are an American punk rock band formed in Washington, D.C., in 1976. They are widely regarded as pioneers of hardcore punk. They are also a reggae band, while later recordings featured elements of other genres like funk, heavy metal, hip-hop, and soul. Rolling Stone magazine called them "the mother of all black hard-rock bands", and they have been cited as a seminal influence to numerous other subgenres in addition to hardcore punk, including various subgenres of heavy metal, such as thrash/speed metal, alternative metal, and funk metal. Bad Brains are followers of the Rastafari movement.

Bad Brains have released nine studio albums. They have broken up and reformed several times over their career, sometimes with different singers or drummers. The band originally formed in 1976 as a jazz fusion act under the name Mind Power. Their classic lineup includes Dr. Know (guitar), Darryl Jenifer (bass), and brothers Earl (drums) and Paul "H.R." Hudson (vocals, guitar). This lineup was intact until 1987 and has reunited periodically in the years since. Many notable bands and artists cite Bad Brains as an artistic influence on their music.

== History ==
=== Formation and early years (1976–1985) ===
The band's origins date to 1976, when the members first came together as a jazz fusion band called Mind Power, in the mold of bands such as Return to Forever and Mahavishnu Orchestra. The group included lead guitarist Dr. Know (Gary Miller), bassist Darryl Jenifer, and brothers Paul Hudson (later known as H.R.) on rhythm guitar and Earl Hudson on drums.

In 1977, the band's then-singer Sid McCray introduced them to punk rock. Mind Power decided to switch their sound to hardcore punk and changed their name to Bad Brains, after the Ramones song "Bad Brain.". The band members became interested in reggae music and the Rastafari movement after seeing Bob Marley in concert. McCray was briefly the singer for the new hardcore punk incarnation of the band, but he soon departed and H.R. switched from guitar to lead vocals.

The band gained a fan base in Washington D.C. due to their high-energy performances and occasional reggae songs. In 1979, they were blacklisted from many Washington area clubs due to their destructive fans; this was later addressed in their song "Banned in D.C.". Around 1980, the band relocated to New York City, where they would serve as a catalyst for that city's then-burgeoning hardcore scene.

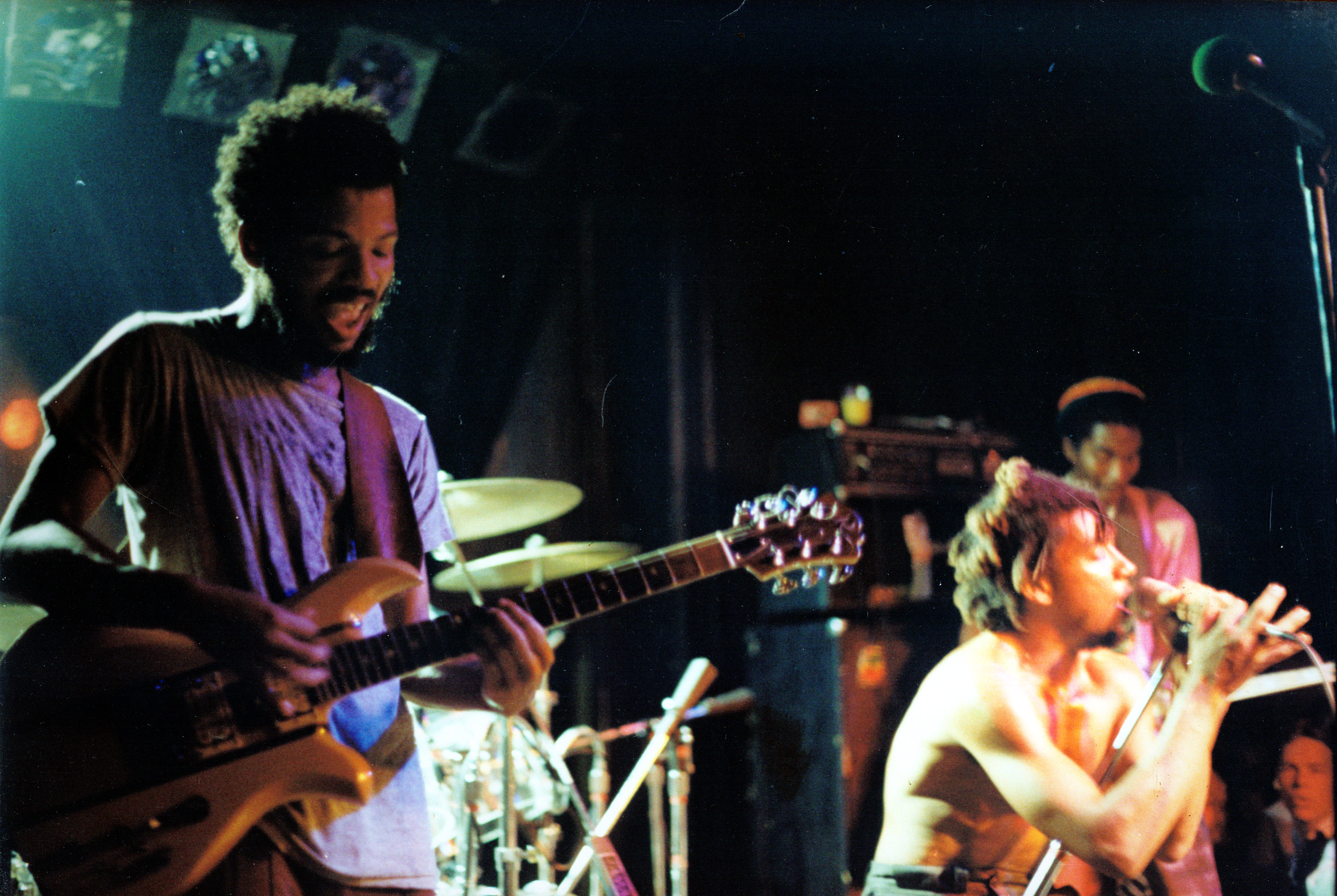
Bad Brains at 9:30 Club, Washington, D.C., 1983

By 1982, they were a regular act at the New York venue CBGB. Dr. Know recalled, "We played CB's every friggin' night. This whole 'Sunday matinee' thing is from us. When we first played, nobody was there. It's like, 'Who are these niggers?' And we're in their face, killing it. We got a weekend day, and by then a little buzz started happening." Their self-titled debut album was released on the ROIR label, originally on cassette only, in 1982, followed a year later by Rock for Light, produced by Ric Ocasek of The Cars. In 1985, the Bad Brains song "Pay to Cum" was featured in Martin Scorsese's film After Hours.

=== Stylistic expansion and lineup changes (1986–1994) ===
In 1986, Bad Brains signed with SST Records and released I Against I. In addition to the band's hardcore punk and reggae sounds, this album added elements from heavy metal and funk. H.R. provided the vocals for the song "Sacred Love" over the phone from the Lorton Reformatory while serving time for a cannabis charge. H.R. gained additional critical notice for his expanded vocal style on I Against I; according to Rick Anderson of AllMusic, "[HR] digs deep into his bag of voices and pulls them all out, one by one: the frightening nasal falsetto that was his signature in the band's hardcore days, an almost bel canto baritone, and a declamatory speed-rap chatter that spews lyrics with the mechanical precision of a machine gun".

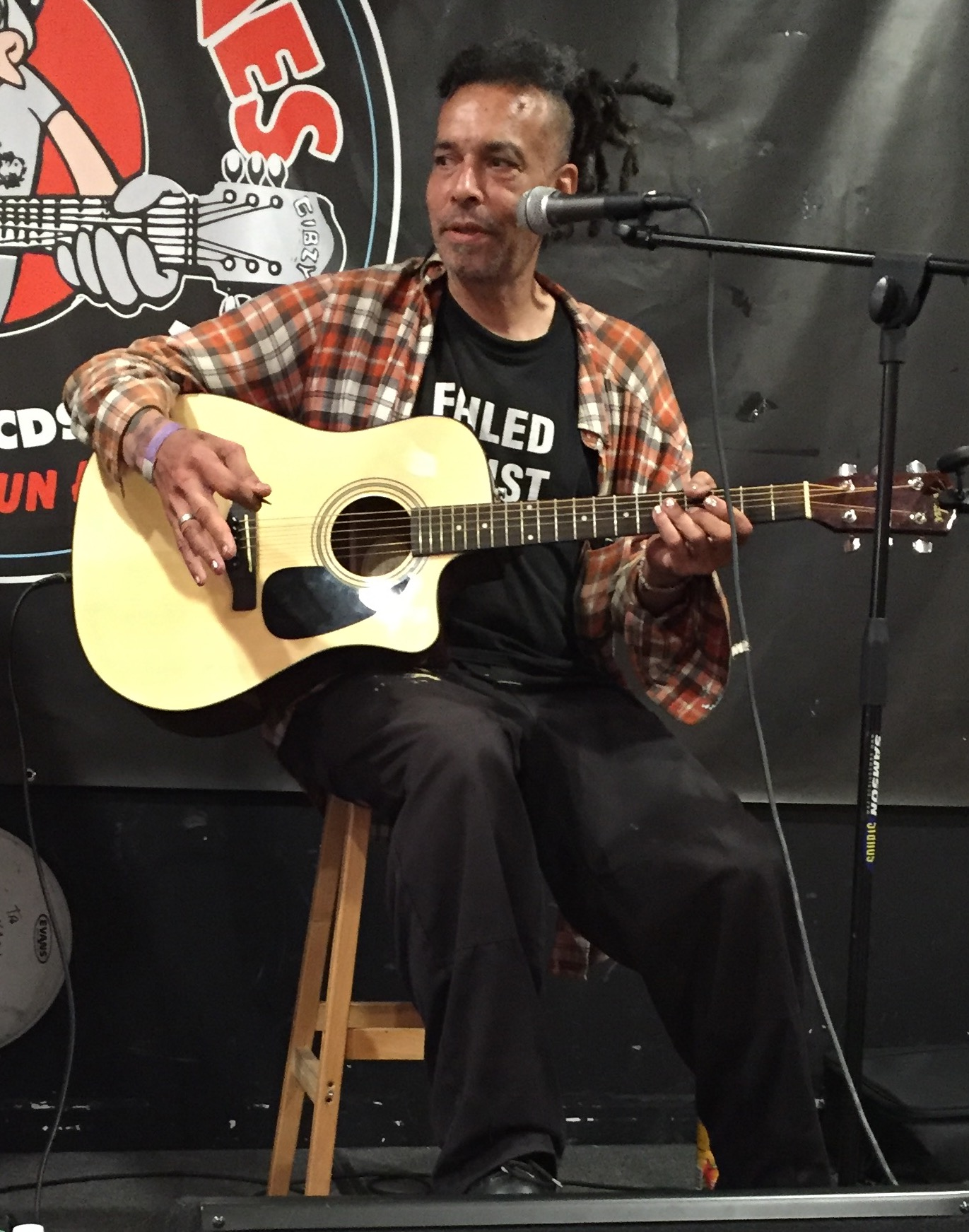
Chuck Mosley fronted Bad Brains from 1990 to 1991.

H.R. and Earl Hudson quit the band in 1987 to focus on reggae music. Touring for I Against I was completed with singer Taj Singleton and former Cro-Mags drummer Mackie Jayson. In 1988, Bad Brains signed with Caroline Records and began recording the album Quickness. The album was recorded with Singleton and Jayson, but the Hudson brothers returned to the band in 1989 and H.R. replaced Singleton's work with new lyrics and vocals. Released in September of that year, Quickness saw Bad Brains expand their sound from that of I Against I, and has also been recognized as one of the early groove metal albums.

During this period, the Hudson brothers, who wanted to steer the band toward reggae, often clashed with Dr. Know and Jenifer, who were increasingly interested in hard rock and heavy metal. H.R. often failed to turn up for scheduled concerts and recording sessions. After the tour supporting Quickness ended in 1990, the Hudson brothers again quit the band. Mackie Jayson rejoined on drums, while former Faith No More member Chuck Mosley took over on lead vocals, and was then replaced by Israel Joseph I (Dexter Pinto). Also in 1990, the band collaborated with Henry Rollins on a cover of The MC5's "Kick Out the Jams", which appears on the soundtrack to the film Pump Up the Volume.

As bands influenced by Bad Brains (such as Living Colour and Fishbone) enjoyed commercial success, Epic Records approached Dr. Know in 1992 and offered the band their first major-label record deal. The album Rise was released by Epic in 1993. Jayson left the band in the middle of the ensuing tour and was temporarily replaced by Chuck Treece.

=== Original lineup reunions and name change (1994–2004) ===
The Hudson brothers again returned to the band in 1994, and they signed with Maverick Records for the 1995 album God of Love. In support of the album, Bad Brains opened for the Beastie Boys on their Ill Communication tour, and headlined a U.S. tour with a then-unknown Deftones. However, the reunion did not last for long, because of H.R.'s erratic behavior while performing and several violent incidents against the band's manager, fans, and venue employees. H.R. landed in jail and the band broke up once again.

In 1997 Bad Brains reconvened to remaster some early recordings, which were released as the EP The Omega Sessions. From 1998 to 2001, the original lineup toured under the name Soul Brains and released a live album.

=== Build a Nation and Into the Future (2005–2015) ===
In 2005, the band, known once again as Bad Brains, announced that they were recording their first album of new material in ten years, with MCA of the Beastie Boys producing. They played their first shows in several years at CBGB in 2006. Build a Nation was released in 2007. . Daryl Jenifer released the solo album In Search of Black Judas in 2010. A short Bad Brains tour of Australia planned for 2010 was cancelled for health reasons.

Bad Brains announced the recording of another new album in 2011. Into the Future was released in late 2012, and included a tribute to the recently deceased MCA. On the ensuing tour, the band added touring keyboardist Jamie Saft. In 2014, the band hinted at another new album, though no such album has been released. Also in 2014, author Greg Prato released the book Punk! Hardcore! Reggae! PMA! Bad Brains! which recounted the band's history. In 2015 the band recorded the live EP The Woodstock Sessions; H.R. did not participate for undisclosed reasons and was replaced by Jamaican singer Jesse Royal. H.R.'s status at the band remained unclear throughout that year.

=== Members' health issues and current status (2015–present) ===
In November 2015, Dr. Know suffered a heart attack and was placed on life support due to the risk of organ failure. After three months in the hospital he made a full recovery, thanks in part to a GoFundMe campaign organized by his bandmates. In March 2016, H.R. announced that he had been diagnosed with a rare type of headache called SUNCT, and received treatment for this condition and other ongoing health issues thanks to another GoFundMe campaign.

In October 2016, Bad Brains were nominated for the Rock and Roll Hall of Fame, but were not inducted. In a December 2016 interview with Rolling Stone, Dr. Know and Darryl Jenifer discussed the band members' health issues and the future of the band. They announced that they hoped to record a new album titled Mind Power, after the band's short-lived original moniker. In June 2017, the band played a show featuring guest appearances by Lamb of God's Randy Blythe and original Bad Brains singer Sid McCray, who sang with the band for the first time in 39 years.

Former singer Chuck Mosley died in November 2017. Sid McCray died in September 2020.

While no official breakup or hiatus of Bad Brains was ever announced, the band has not performed live since 2017 due to H.R.'s continuous health struggles; many benefit shows were held to help pay for his medical bills, including one at the Teragram Ballroom in Los Angeles in December 2023 and another at the Brooklyn Bowl in New York in April 2024. Trust Records released Are You Ready: The First Studio Recording (Inner Ear - March 1979), a collection of songs Bad Brains recorded in 1979, on November 6, 2026. Mixed by Ian McKaye, it marked the first time all tracks from this session were officially released by the band after years of limited availability "among tape-trading punks".

== Legacy ==
Bad Brains have had a significant impact on music, particularly on rock and metal bands that followed them. Dave Grohl of Nirvana and Foo Fighters has stated that they were one of his favorite bands during his childhood and that he "learned to play drums by arranging pillows on my floor and my bed in the formation of a drum set and playing along to Bad Brains."

Bad Brains have also exerted massive influence over punk rock, being credited as pioneers of hardcore punk and the associated genre of youth crew, though the band's members have objected to the use of the term "hardcore punk" to describe their music. They are also cited as influences on thrash metal and extreme metal in general, being cited as an influence by bands such as Metallica, Slayer, Sepultura, and Anthrax.

Funk metal and ska punk also largely owe themselves to Bad Brains' innovations. Pioneering bands of these subgenres that have cited Bad Brains as an influence include the Red Hot Chili Peppers, Faith No More, Sublime, No Doubt, Fishbone, 311, and Living Colour.

Bad Brains were listed by Alternative Press among the ten most influential bands in hardcore, stating, "Their ultra-speedy approach to hardcore punk coupled with their reggae influences shaped a new sound that no one has ever quite recreated. Both their music and their progressiveness in fighting against political movements earns them a place as one of the most influential bands of all time."

Other bands and artists that have cited Bad Brains as an influence include the Beastie Boys, Guns N' Roses, Soundgarden, the Dillinger Escape Plan, Jane's Addiction, System of a Down, Rage Against the Machine, Deftones, Clutch, Green Day, the Offspring, the Roots, Lamb of God, P.O.D., and Corrosion of Conformity.

== Band members ==
Current members

- Dr. Know – lead guitar, keyboards (1976–1995, 1998–present)
- Darryl Jenifer – bass (1976–1995, 1998–present) backing vocals (1982–1983)
- H.R. – lead vocals, occasional rhythm guitar (1976–1987, 1989–1990, 1994–1995, 1998–present)
- Earl Hudson – drums (1976–1987, 1989–1990, 1994–1995, 1998–present) backing vocals (1982–1983)

Former members

- Sid McCray – lead vocals (1977–1979, 2017; died 2020)
- Mackie Jayson – drums (1988–1989, 1990–1993)
- Taj Singleton – lead vocals (1988–1989)
- Chuck Mosley – lead vocals (1990–1991; died 2017)
- Israel Joseph I – lead vocals (1991–1994, 2008)
- Chuck Treece – drums (1994)
- Jesse Royal – lead vocals (2015)

== Discography ==
- Bad Brains (1982)
- Rock for Light (1983)
- I Against I (1986)
- Quickness (1989)
- Rise (1993)
- God of Love (1995)
- I & I Survived (2002)
- Build a Nation (2007)
- Into the Future (2012)
