= H.R. (musician) =

American musician (born 1956)

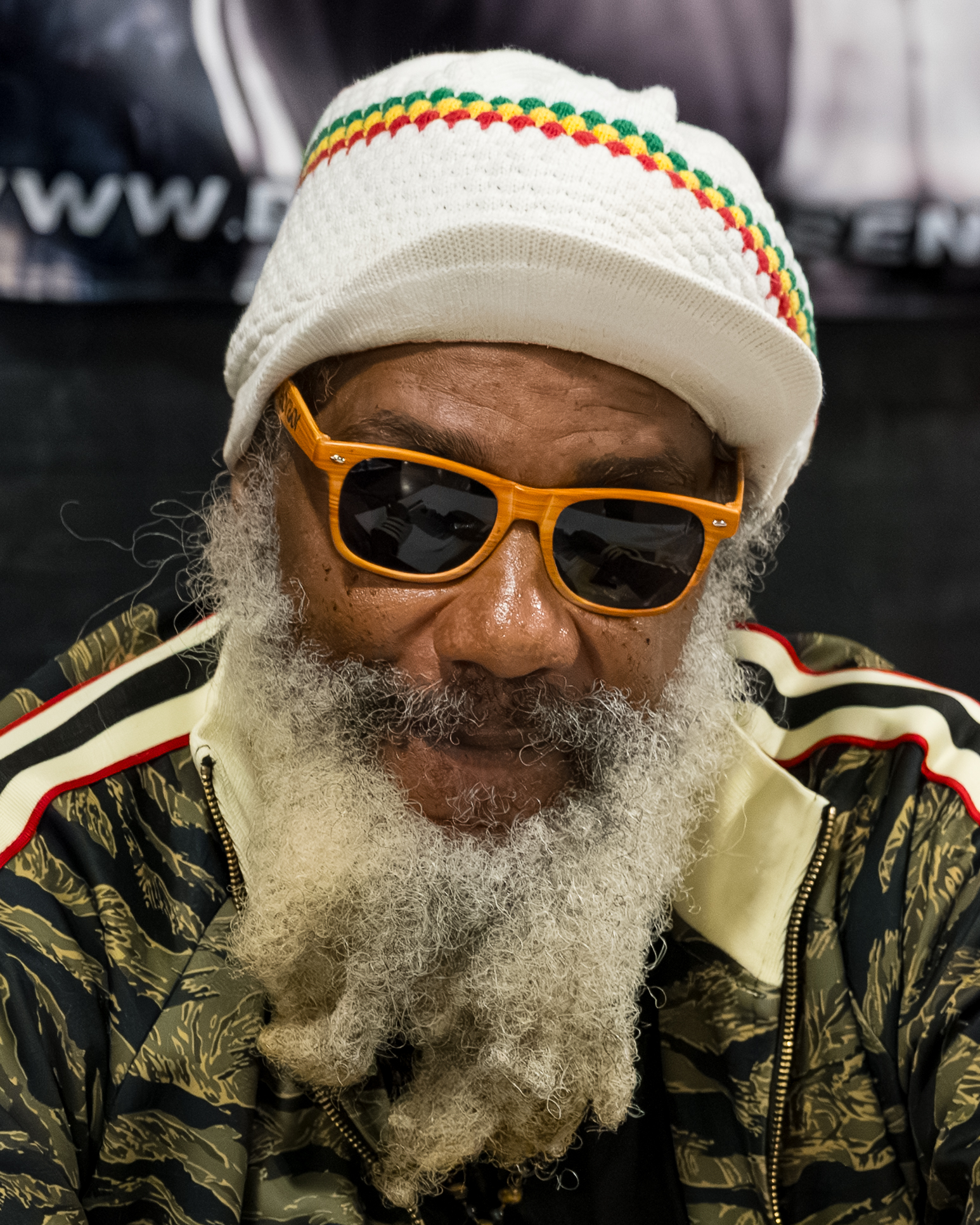
- H.R. at GalaxyCon Nashville in 2026

Background information
- Born: Paul D. Hudson; February 11, 1956 (age 70); Liverpool, England
- Origin: Washington, D.C.
- Genres: Hardcore punk; reggae
- Occupation: Singer
- Instruments: Vocals; guitar; bass guitar
- Years active: 1977–present
- Member of: Bad Brains
- Website: bio.site/HRmusic

Paul D. Hudson (born February 11, 1956), known professionally as H.R. (Human Rights), is an American musician who also leads the hardcore punk band Bad Brains, and is an instrumental figure in the development of the genre. His vocal delivery has been described as diverse, ranging from a rapid-fire nasal whine, to feral growling and screeches, to smooth near-crooning or staccato reggae rhymes. He has departed the band periodically to pursue solo efforts that are more inspired by reggae than Bad Brains' punk sound. He is the older brother of Bad Brains' drummer Earl Hudson.

== Early life ==
H.R. was born in Liverpool, England, to a Jamaican mother and American father stationed with the US Air Force in the UK. His family moved to the United States when he was a toddler, and proceeded to move around until finally settling in Washington, D.C. He was a gifted athlete from an early age, competing in swimming and pole-vaulting. He and his younger brother Earl both entered the local D.C. music scene as teenagers with their friends and future bandmates Dr. Know and Darryl Jenifer. H.R. was an early nickname that initially stood for "hunting rod", but which he changed to stand for "human rights".

== Musical career ==
H.R. and his bandmates became Rastafari around 1979 after attending a Bob Marley concert at the Capital Centre. This spiritual direction influenced the music of Bad Brains via his vocals, and inspired the creation of his reggae band, Human Rights (or H.R.).

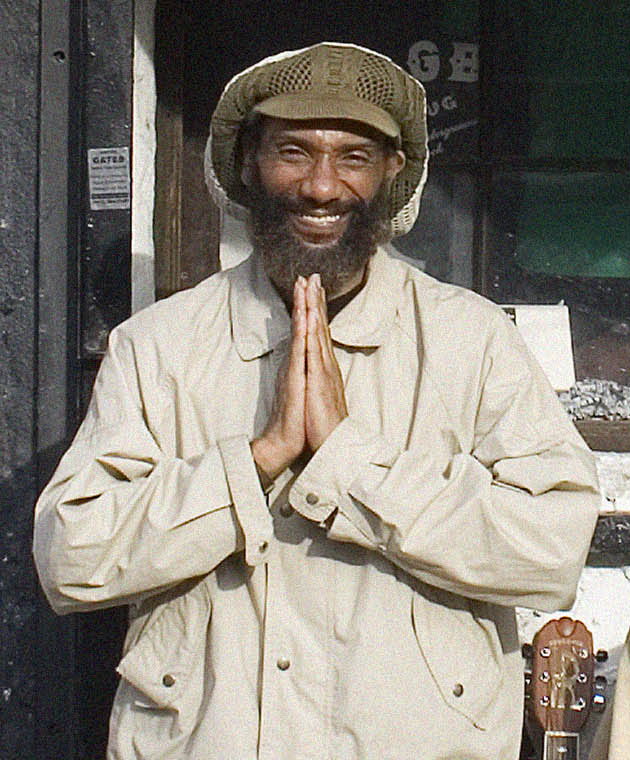
H.R. outside of New York's CBGB in 2006

Although reggae is the main focus of his solo material, he explores rock and other musical genres. He has had numerous albums released on SST Records. A Village Voice review of a Bad Brains concert described H.R.'s presence on stage: "like James Brown gone berserk, with a hyperkinetic repertoire of spins, dives, back-flips, splits, and skanks".

H.R. has collaborated with the Long Beach Dub Allstars on their song "New Sun" on the Right Back album, and with P.O.D. on their song "Without Jah, Nothin'", on the album Satellite.

In recent years, H.R.'s Human Rights performances have become markedly more mellow and restrained, focusing primarily on reggae. This is a stark contrast to his wildly animated, aggressive stage performances of the late 1970s and 1980s.

Interviews with H.R. feature prominently in the 2006 documentary American Hardcore, in which he discusses the early days of the hardcore scene in New York City and Washington D.C., and his association with peers like Minor Threat and the Cro-Mags. In particular, he recalls encouraging Ian MacKaye to fully articulate Minor Threat's emerging straight edge philosophy, to give young people a positive direction. As depicted in the 2012 documentary Bad Brains: A Band in D.C., H.R.'s bizarre behavior, such as wearing a motorcycle helmet during a performance and refusing to sing, caused friction with other members of the band.

In late 2016, the film Finding Joseph I: The HR From Bad Brains Documentary premiered in Europe and the United States. Directed by James Lathos, the documentary features interviews with H.R., as well as other musicians, peers, and family member, while chronicling his life, struggles, and philosophies, particularly "PMA" (positive mental attitude). The film's companion book was published by Lesser Gods in January 2017.

== Author ==
H.R. released his first children’s book, I've Got The PMA!, in 2020, with punk illustrators HECreative. This book is about positivity and teaching tomorrow’s adults about the message of Positive Mental Attitude that HR has been spreading for over 40 years.

== Personal life ==
H.R. has adult children from previous relationships and has been married to Lori Carnes since 2012.

In 2016, Lori revealed that H.R. has SUNCT syndrome, a rare neurological disorder which causes sporadic, excruciating headaches. He underwent brain surgery in early 2017 to relieve the headaches. In 2023, he revealed that the surgery had only been moderately successful and that the headaches continue. He also has schizoaffective disorder.

== Discography ==
For H.R.'s discography with Bad Brains, see Bad Brains discography.

- It's About Luv (Olive Tree, 1985)
- Keep Out of Reach (Olive Tree, 1986)
- Human Rights (Olive Tree/SST, 1987)
- Singin' in the Heart (SST, 1989)
- Charge (SST, 1990)
- I Luv (1991)
- Rock of Enoch (1992)
- Our Faith (1992)
- Hey Wella (2007)
- Out of Bounds (D.I.A, 2012)
- HR in Dubb (D.I.A./Hamma, 2013)
- HR Live at CBGB's 1984 (Catch a Fire Music, 2017)
- Give Thanks (Hardline Entertainment, 2019)

=== Appearances on albums by other artists ===
- "Heroes" and "Heroes Part 2" on Return from Incas by Lost Generation (Incas, 1984)
- "Zion", "Zion Dub" and "Road to Zion (Highest Region Dub)" on Zion by Zion Train (Olive Tree, 1986)
- "New Sun" on Right Back by Long Beach Dub Allstars (DreamWorks, 1999)
- "Black Eye" on 77 003 by Bargain Music (Beatville, 1999)
- "Like a Lily" on Se Viene El Bum by Lumumba (Gora Herriak, 1999)
- "Without Jah, Nothin'" on Satellite by P.O.D. (Atlantic, 2001)
- "Shame in Dem Game" on Everything Under the Sun by Sublime (Geffen, 2006)
- "Yummy, Yummy, Yummy", "More and More" and "Hip Hip Hooray" on The Epic Trilogy by Gone (SST, 2007)
- "Riya" on The Hour of Reprisal by Ill Bill (Uncle Howie, 2008)
- "Forty Deuce Hebrew" on The Grimy Awards by Ill Bill (Fat Beats, 2013)
- "Lucky Rabbit" on Pains by Islander (Victory, 2013)
- "Chant It Down" on Chaliwa by New Zion Trio (Veal, 2013)
- "Kumbaya" on Luicidal by Luicidal (DC-Jam, 2014)
- "Think It Over" on Power Under Control by Islander (Victory, 2016)
- "The Right to Swerve" on Lore of the Riff by Time Crystal Wizard (Rancho De La Luna Records, 2021)
- "Skateboard Flowers" on It's Not Easy Being Human by Islander (Better Noise, 2022)
- "The Era of the End of Eras" on Solidaritine by Gogol Bordello
- "Breathe" and "Chant" and "Listen" on Ras Asana by I Yahn I Arkestra and Chuck Treece (2017 Inity Records)
- "Trey's Song" on Until the Sun Explodes by Sublime (2025 Atlantic Records)
