= Earl Hudson =

American musician (born 1957)

- Born: December 17, 1957 (age 67); Alabama, United States
- Genres: Hardcore punk
- Occupation: Drummer
- Instrument: Drums

Earl Hudson (born December 17, 1957) is an American musician, best known as the drummer for Bad Brains. Born in Alabama in 1957, Hudson is the younger brother of the band's lead singer H.R. Although he has rarely recorded or performed outside of the band, he and bandmates, guitarist Dr. Know and bassist Darryl Jenifer, were recruited by rapper Lil' Jon, a longtime fan of the band, to record the song "Real Nigga Roll Call", which interpolated the music of I Against I's "Re-Ignition". He has also appeared on albums by H.R. as well as in H.R.'s live band in 1980s and 1990s.
