= Dr. Know (guitarist) =

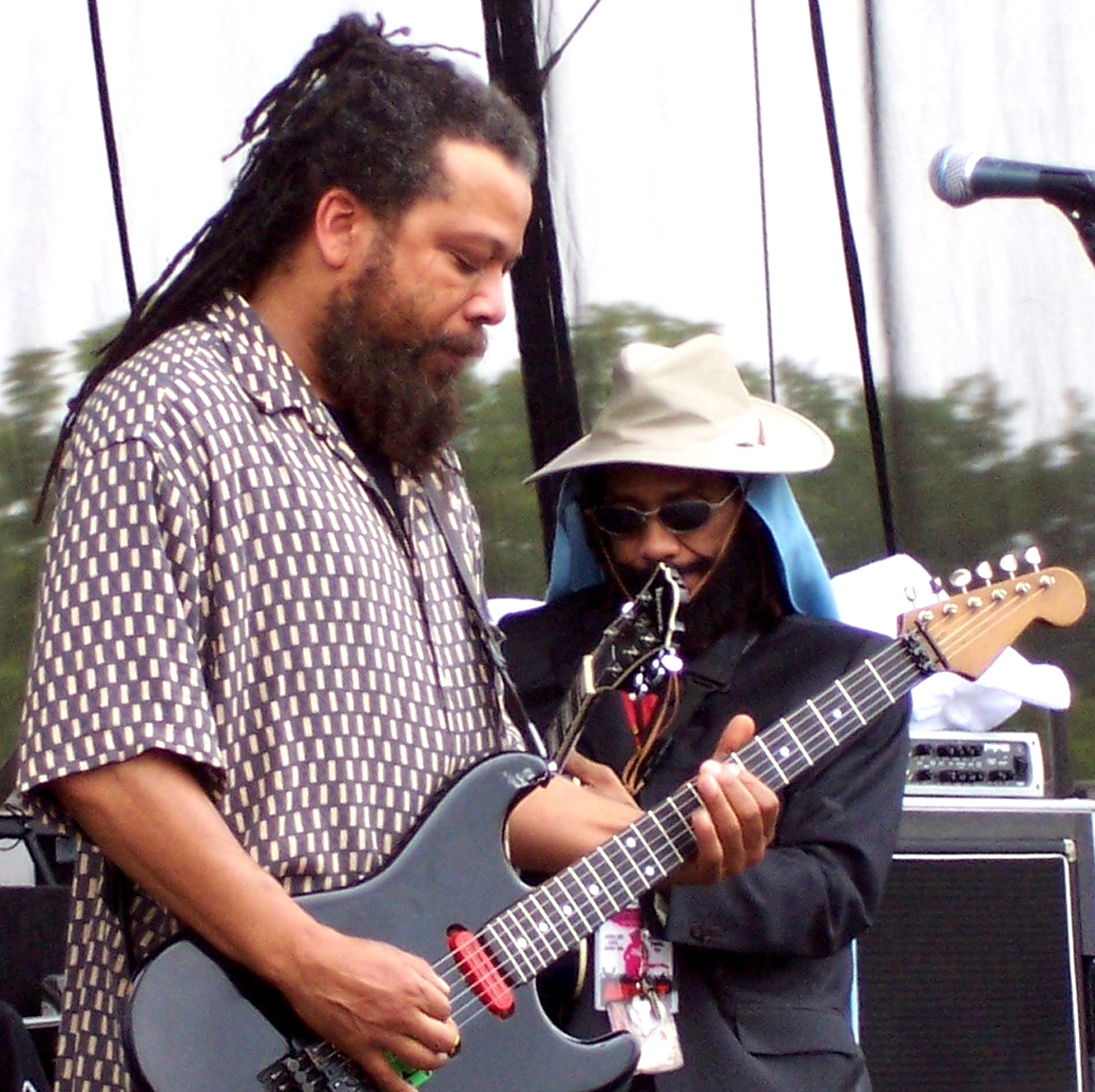
- Dr. Know in 2007

Background information
- Born: Gary Wayne Miller; September 15, 1958 (age 67); Washington, D.C., United States
- Origin: Washington, D.C., United States
- Genres: Punk rock; reggae; alternative metal
- Occupations: Musician; guitarist
- Instruments: Guitar; keyboards
- Years active: 1977–present

Gary Wayne Miller (born September 15, 1958), better known by his stage name Dr. Know, is an American musician, who rose to prominence as the guitarist for the Washington D.C. hardcore punk band Bad Brains, who were critically acclaimed for their innovative musical style and are regarded as one of the greatest and most influential punk rock bands of all time. Critic Rick Anderson praises Miller's "ability to meld the raw directness of hardcore punk with an almost supernatural virtuosity without sacrificing the power of either approach".

== Personal life and musical career ==
Born in Washington, D.C., Miller has recorded or performed very little outside the group Bad Brains, though he has performed with Mos Def's group Black Jack Johnson. He also performed a solo on the Coheed and Cambria song "Time Consumer" for their first album The Second Stage Turbine Blade, and he collaborated with Deftones on Saturday Night Wrist, although his contributions do not appear on the album. In early 2010, he made an appearance at the Trocadero in Philadelphia, PA, playing two songs with students from Paul Green's School of Rock Music at the Best of Season show.

In the 2012 documentary Bad Brains: A Band in D.C., Miller revealed that prior to forming Bad Brains the musicians were influenced by a wide variety of music, including disco and modern jazz. Performances by The Dead Boys and other underground bands turned them on to punk rock.

In the 2000s, he took on work at a Woodstock, N.Y.-area natural food grocery store, Sunfrost Farms.

=== Health issues ===
Miller suffered a heart attack in November 2015 and his condition quickly progressed to multiple organ failure. He was on life support for almost two weeks and was given a 5% chance of survival. His bandmates asked fans to help via a GoFundMe campaign to pay his expenses for rehabilitation. After nearly three months in the hospital, he was transferred to a medical rehabilitation facility for the physical therapy and treatment that he needed to make a full recovery.

=== Latest projects ===
In 2016, Miller formed the supergroup Saudade along with singer and guitarist Chino Moreno of Deftones, Team Sleep, Palms, and Crosses; jazz keyboardist John Medeski of Medeski Martin & Wood; bassist Chuck Doom, co-member of Crosses and Team Sleep; guitarist David Torn; and drummer Mackie Jayson of Cro-Mags and Bad Brains.
