= Darryl Jenifer =

American musician (born 1960)

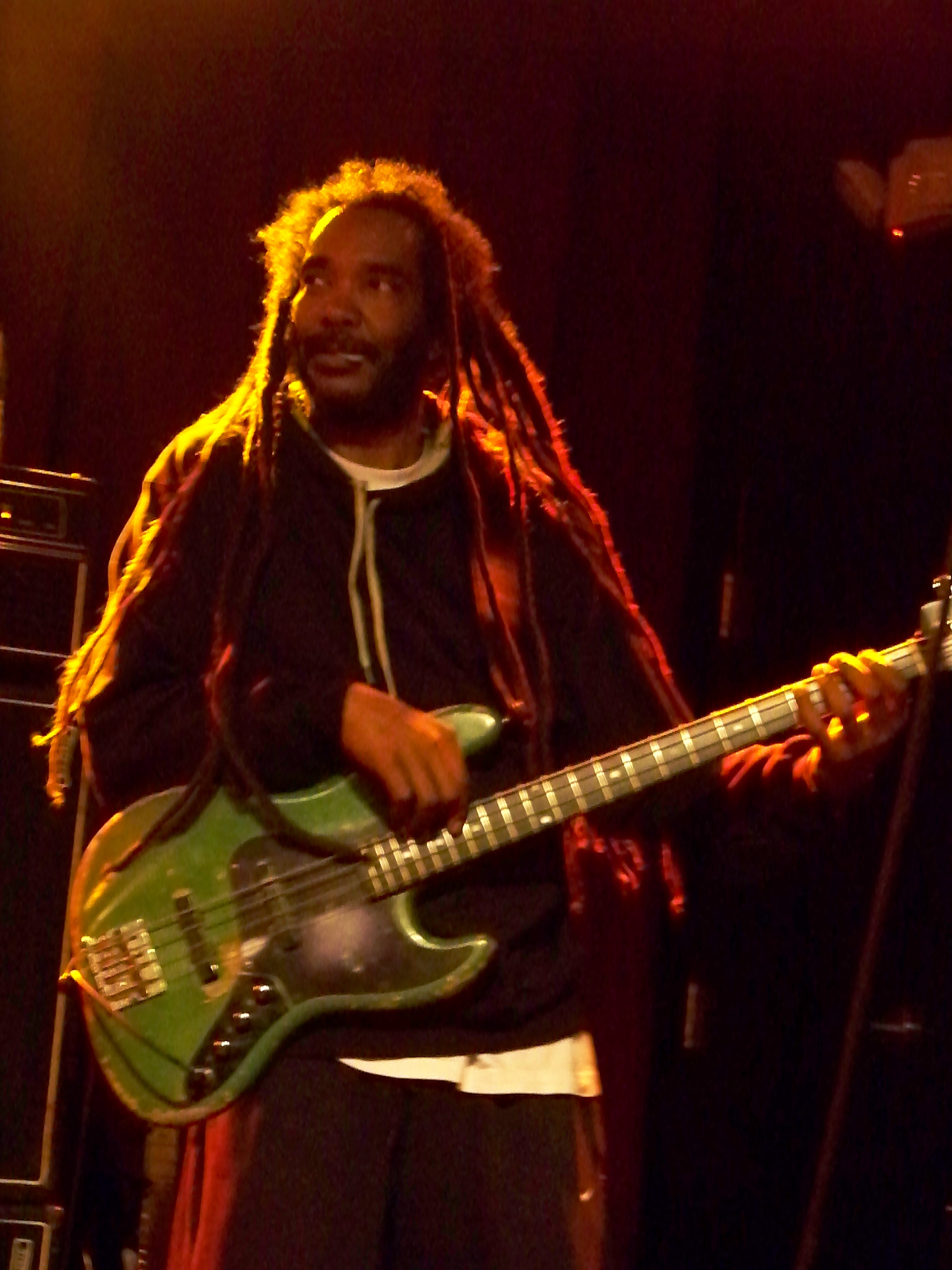
- Jenifer playing with Bad Brains, 2012

Background information
- Born: Darryl Aaron Jenifer; October 22, 1960 (age 65); Washington, D.C., U.S.
- Genres: Hardcore punk
- Instrument: Bass guitar

Darryl Aaron Jenifer (born October 22, 1960) is an American musician and music producer, widely known as the bassist for the hardcore punk band Bad Brains and for the rap-rock group The White Mandingos. He appeared in TV's Illest Minority Moments presented by ego trip and the three-part ego trip's Race-O-Rama on VH1.

Jenifer credits numerous musicians and bands for inspiring and influencing his playing, including Al Di Meola, James Jamerson, Geezer Butler, Larry Graham, Stanley Clarke, Percy Jones, Aston Barrett, Lloyd Parks, Errol Holt, Bob Marley, Mahavishnu Orchestra, 999, Eater, Stevie Wonder, Paul Simonon, the Ramones, Return to Forever, Brand X, Weather Report, Earth, Wind, and Fire, Lonnie Liston Smith, Roy Ayers, the Dickies, the Damned, Generation X, the Buzzcocks, Sly and the Family Stone, Led Zeppelin, Peter Frampton, and Black Sabbath.

Jenifer released his first solo album entitled In Search of Black Judas on October 26, 2010. The album had been in development for nearly a decade.
