= Lo-Pan =

Lo-Pan may refer to:

- Lo-Pan, a character in the 1986 film Big Trouble in Little China
- Lo-Pan (band), a hard rock band from Columbus, Ohio

== See also ==
- Lo Pan Temple, a historic building in Hong Kong
- Lopan River, a river in Russia
- Lo Pan, also transliterated as Lu Ban, the patron saint of Chinese builders and contractors
