= Sucking the 70's – Back in the Saddle Again =

2006 compilation album by Various

Compilation album by various artists
- Released: 2006
- Genre: Stoner metal
- Label: Small Stone Records

Various artists chronology
Sucking the 70's (2002)	Sucking the 70's – Back in the Saddle Again (2006)

Sucking the 70's – Back in the Saddle is a follow-up album to the 2002 compilation Sucking the 70's. It was released in 2006 by Small Stone Records. Like the original, it features stoner rock bands covering songs from the 1970s.

== Track listing ==
=== Disc 1 ===
1. "Are You Ready" - Sasquatch (originally performed by Grand Funk Railroad)
2. "Crazy Horses" - Puny Human (originally performed by The Osmonds)
3. "Red Hot Mama" - Clutch & Five Horse Johnson (originally performed by Funkadelic)
4. "Rock Candy" - Dixie Witch (originally performed by Montrose)
5. "Don't Lie to Me" - The Brought Low (originally performed by Big Star)
6. "Sin City" - Novadriver (originally performed by AC/DC)
7. "One Way or Another" - Colour Haze (originally performed by Cactus)
8. "Man on the Silver Mountain" - Alabama Thunderpussy (originally performed by Rainbow)
9. "Mongoloid" - Dozer (originally performed by Devo)
10. "The Stake" - Acid King (originally performed by Steve Miller Band)
11. "Honky Cat" - Halfway to Gone (originally performed by Elton John)
12. "Those Shoes" - Antler (originally performed by The Eagles)
13. "Outlaw Man" - Brad Davis (Fu Manchu) (originally performed by The Eagles)
14. "Season of the Witch" - Gideon Smith & the Dixie Damned (originally performed by Donovan)
15. "Runnin' With the Devil" - Whitey Morgan and the Waycross Georgia Farmboys (originally performed by Van Halen)

=== Disc 2 ===
1. "I Just Wanna Make Love to You" - Throttlerod (originally performed by Muddy Waters, covered by many 1970s bands)
2. "Saturday Night Special" - Red Giant (originally performed by Lynyrd Skynyrd)
3. "Bonie Moronie" - A Thousand Knives of Fire (originally performed by Ritchie Valens)
4. "Rock 'n' Roll Singer" - The Glasspack (originally performed by AC/DC)
5. "When the Levee Breaks" - Roadsaw (originally performed by Kansas Joe McCoy & Memphis Minnie & covered by Led Zeppelin)
6. "Super Stupid" - Greatdayforup (originally performed by Funkadelic)
7. "Turn to Stone" - Fireball Ministry (originally performed by Joe Walsh)
8. "Born to Be Wild" - Los Natas (originally performed by Steppenwolf)
9. "Two of Us" - Scott Reeder (originally performed by The Beatles)
10. "New Rose" - Orange Goblin (originally performed by The Damned)
11. "Garden Road" - Mos Generator (originally performed by Rush)
12. "Snortin' Whiskey" - Honky (originally performed by Pat Travers)
13. "I Don't Need No Doctor" - The Muggs (originally performed by Ray Charles & covered by Humble Pie)
14. "Neighbor, Neighbor" - Amplified Heat (originally performed by ZZ Top)
15. "Parchment Farm" - RPG (originally performed by Bukka White, covered by many 1970s bands)
16. "Dreamweaver" - Valis (originally performed by Gary Wright)
