= Morsel =

Morsel may refer to:

- Morsel (band), an indie rock ensemble
- Óláfr Guðrøðarson (died 1153), a twelfth-century King of the Isles
- Chocolate chip, also known as a chocolate morsel, a small piece of chocolate used in baking
