= On Fire (The Lights Out album) =

Studio album by The Lights Out
- Released: 2012
- Genre: Rock
- Label: Self-Released
- Producer: Benny Grotto

On Fire is the third full-length album from The Lights Out. It was released on June 1, 2012, and "Today Was the Day" was selected as MP3 of the Week by the Boston Phoenix. It was produced by Benny Grotto at Mad Oak Studios in Allston, Massachusetts. It was the first album where three band members sang lead vocals, and was also the first to include keyboards and synthesizers. During production, the power was knocked out to the studio, and the Boston Blackout occurred. The track, "Getaway", was featured on the final season of MTV's Jersey Shore. The band supported the album by performing at South by Southwest.

== Track listing ==
1. "New Mistakes"
2. "Steal Your Sunshine"
3. "Bitter Honey"
4. "Didja Hear Me Stutter?"
5. "On Fire"
6. "One Way To Die"
7. "Get Away"
8. "Today Was The Day"
