= Primetime (album) =

Studio album by The Lights Out
- Released: 2011
- Genre: Rock
- Label: Self-Released
- Producer: Benny Grotto

Primetime is the second full-length album from Boston-based rock group The Lights Out. Self-released at midnight on January 1, 2011, it was produced by Boston Music Awards Producer Of The Year: Benny Grotto at Mad Oak Studios in Allston, Massachusetts. The album's theme is about what it is like to be in a band. To promote the album, The Lights Out posted advertisements featuring their tour van on Craigslist, AutoTrader and Cars.com. The album cover features an image of the band's tour van which they named "Tim," with the reflection of the Allston bar, The Model Cafe, where the band got its start.

== Track listing ==
1. "Primetime"
2. "Can't Buy a Hero"
3. "Open Season"
4. "Enilyse"
5. "Interstellar Valentine"
6. "Ordinary Crime"
7. "Mamacita"
8. "Only on the Outside"
9. "Hollow You"
10. "After the Fall"
11. "Having it All"
