= Sucking the 70's =

Compilation album by various artists
- Released: January 1, 2002
- Genre: Stoner metal
- Length: 78:05 (disc 1); 77:54 (disc 2)
- Label: Small Stone Records

Various artists chronology
Sucking the 70's (2002)	Sucking the 70's – Back in the Saddle Again (2006)

Sucking the 70's is a two disc collection of 1970s songs, covered by modern stoner rock bands. It was released by Small Stone Records in 2002. A second album, Sucking the 70's – Back in the Saddle Again, was released in 2006. The album title is a reference to the Rolling Stones compilation Sucking in the Seventies.

== Track listing ==
=== Disc 1 (78:05) ===
1. "Never in My Life" – Five Horse Johnson 4:47 (originally performed by Mountain)
2. "Black Betty" – Throttlerod 3:48 (first recorded commercially by Lead Belly, covered by Ram Jam)
3. "On the Hunt" – Dixie Witch 6:05 (originally performed by Lynyrd Skynyrd)
4. "Cross Eyed Mary" – Clutch 3:31 (originally performed by Jethro Tull)
5. "T.V. Eye" – The Glasspack 4:47 (originally performed by The Stooges)
6. "Free for All" – The Last Vegas 3:22 (originally performed by Ted Nugent)
7. "Can't You See" – Halfway to Gone 4:53 (originally performed by The Marshall Tucker Band)
8. "Working Man" – Suplecs 7:42 (originally performed by Rush)
9. "Travelin' Band/Suzy Is a Headbanger" – Puny Human 4:19 (originally performed by Creedence Clearwater Revival/The Ramones)
10. "We're an American Band" – Raging Slab 3:35 (originally performed by Grand Funk Railroad)
11. "Brainstorm" – Los Natas 8:25 (originally performed by Hawkwind)
12. "For Madmen Only" – The Heads 4:11 (originally performed by May Blitz)
13. "Nasty Dogs & Funky Kings" – Lamont 2:33 (originally performed by ZZ Top)
14. "Child of Babylon" – Backdraft 4:39 (originally performed by Whitesnake)
15. "I Don't Have to Hide" – Black NASA 3:02 (originally performed by Bachman–Turner Overdrive)
16. "Dog Eat Dog" – Warped 3:42 (originally performed by AC/DC)
17. "Bron-Yr-Stomp" – Hangnail 4:35 (originally performed by Led Zeppelin)

=== Disc 2 (77:54) ===
1. "Vehicle" – Roadsaw 2:53 (originally performed by The Ides of March)
2. "20th Century Boy" – Novadriver 3:53 (originally performed by T. Rex)
3. "Hymn 43" – Alabama Thunderpussy 3:24 (originally performed by Jethro Tull)
4. "Communication Breakdown" – Disengage 2:39 (originally performed by Led Zeppelin)
5. "Out on the Weekend" – Porn (The Men Of) 7:47 (originally performed by Neil Young)
6. "Rumblin' Man" – Milligram 3:47 (originally performed by Cactus)
7. "Working for MCA" – Tummler 6:34 (originally performed by Lynyrd Skynyrd)
8. "Doctor Doctor" – Fireball Ministry 4:33 (originally performed by UFO)
9. "Wicked World" – Spirit Caravan 5:33 (originally performed by Black Sabbath)
10. "Freelance Fiend" – Lowrider 3:11 (originally performed by Leaf Hound)
11. "Walk Away" – The Mushroom River Band 3:24 (originally performed by James Gang)
12. "Woman Tamer" – Broadsword 5:26 (originally performed by Sir Lord Baltimore)
13. "Don't Blow Your Mind" – Doubleneck 2:54 (originally performed by Alice Cooper)
14. "Black to Comm" – Lord Sterling 4:33 (originally performed by MC5)
15. "Till the Next Goodbye" – The Brought Low 5:32 (originally performed by The Rolling Stones)
16. "Don't Call Us, We'll Call You" – Scott Reeder 3:29 (originally performed by Sugarloaf)
17. "How Can You Win" – Tectonic Break 2:53 (originally performed by Parish Hall)
18. "The Pusher" – Gideon Smith & the Dixie Damned 5:23 (originally performed by both Hoyt Axton and Steppenwolf)
