= (Le) Poisson Rouge =

Music venue in New York City

- LPR
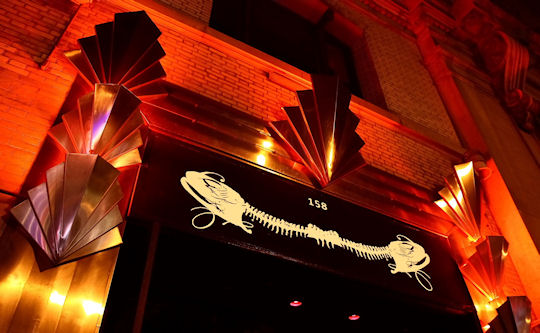
- The façade of (Le) Poisson Rouge
- Interactive map of (Le) Poisson Rouge
- Address: 158 Bleecker Street
- Location: New York City 10012, US
- Coordinates: 40.7284°N 73.999977°W
- Seating type: Standing, cabaret seating, or in-the-round
- Capacity: 700
- Type: Nightclub

Construction
- Opened: 2008

Website
- lpr.com

(Le) Poisson Rouge (often referred to as LPR) is a music venue and multimedia art cabaret in New York City founded in 2008 by Justin Kantor and David Handler on the former site of the Village Gate at 158 Bleecker Street. The performance space was designed and engineered by Walters-Storyk Design Group (WSDG). It has become known for its focus on artistry, bringing contemporary classical music into the club setting, and offering a variety of set ups so that a seated classical performance can be followed by a standing set by a rock band or a DJ. Responding to a performance of Olivier Messiaen's Quartet for the End of Time featuring pianist Bruce Brubaker at LPR, The Wall Street Journal reported: "The crowd – many of whom wouldn't even have known who Messiaen was – sat in rapt silence, and roared their approval at the end."

Kantor and Handler, both graduates of Manhattan School of Music, founded LPR with the stated desire of creating a venue that would foster the fusion of "popular and art cultures" in music, film, theater, dance, and fine art.

The venue is home to a myriad variety of genres focusing on classical, new music, avant garde music, indie rock, hip-hop, and jazz, but also playing host to readings, comedy, film, DJs, parties, theater, and burlesque.

A number of live albums have been recorded at (Le) Poisson Rouge, including an improvised album by J. Spaceman and Kid Millions and Grand Valley State University's New Music Ensemble recording of Terry Riley's In C.

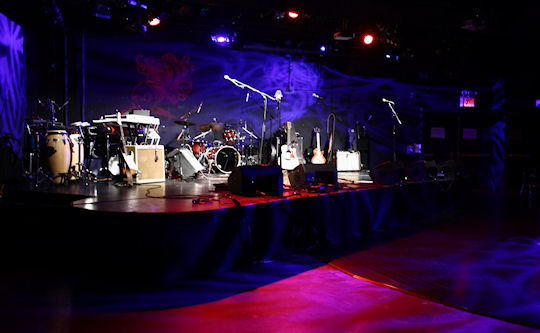
Main stage

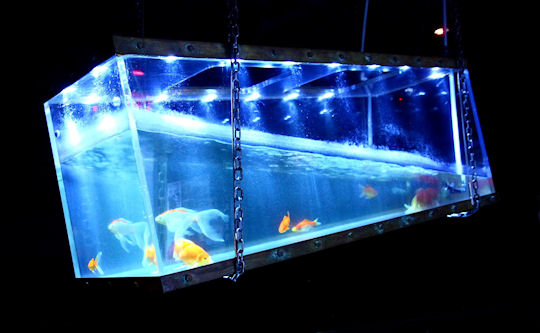
Hanging fishtank in the vestibule

== Awards ==
- 2013 Guest of a Guest's Best NYC Venues to Discover New Musicians
- 2012 & 2013 DownBeat magazine's Great Jazz Rooms of the World
- 2012 Foursquare: New York's Best Music Venues 2012
- 2012 iRockaes Top 50 Live Streaming Sources
- 2011 ASCAP's Victor Herbert Award for excellence in programming
- 2011 Lonely Planet Best of NYC
- 2011 Village Award from Greenwich Village Society for Historic Preservation
- 2011 New York Jazz Record Venue of the Year
- 2010 Paper magazine Best Party in NYC (The Freedom Party)
- 2010 Club Planet Venue of the Week
- 2009 New York magazine's Best High Brow Venue
- 2009 The Village Voice's Best Rock Venue
- Listed in Flavorpill's Best Venues of the 21st Century
- Multiple nominations for Paper magazine's best club in New York City
