= John Storyk =

American architect and acoustician

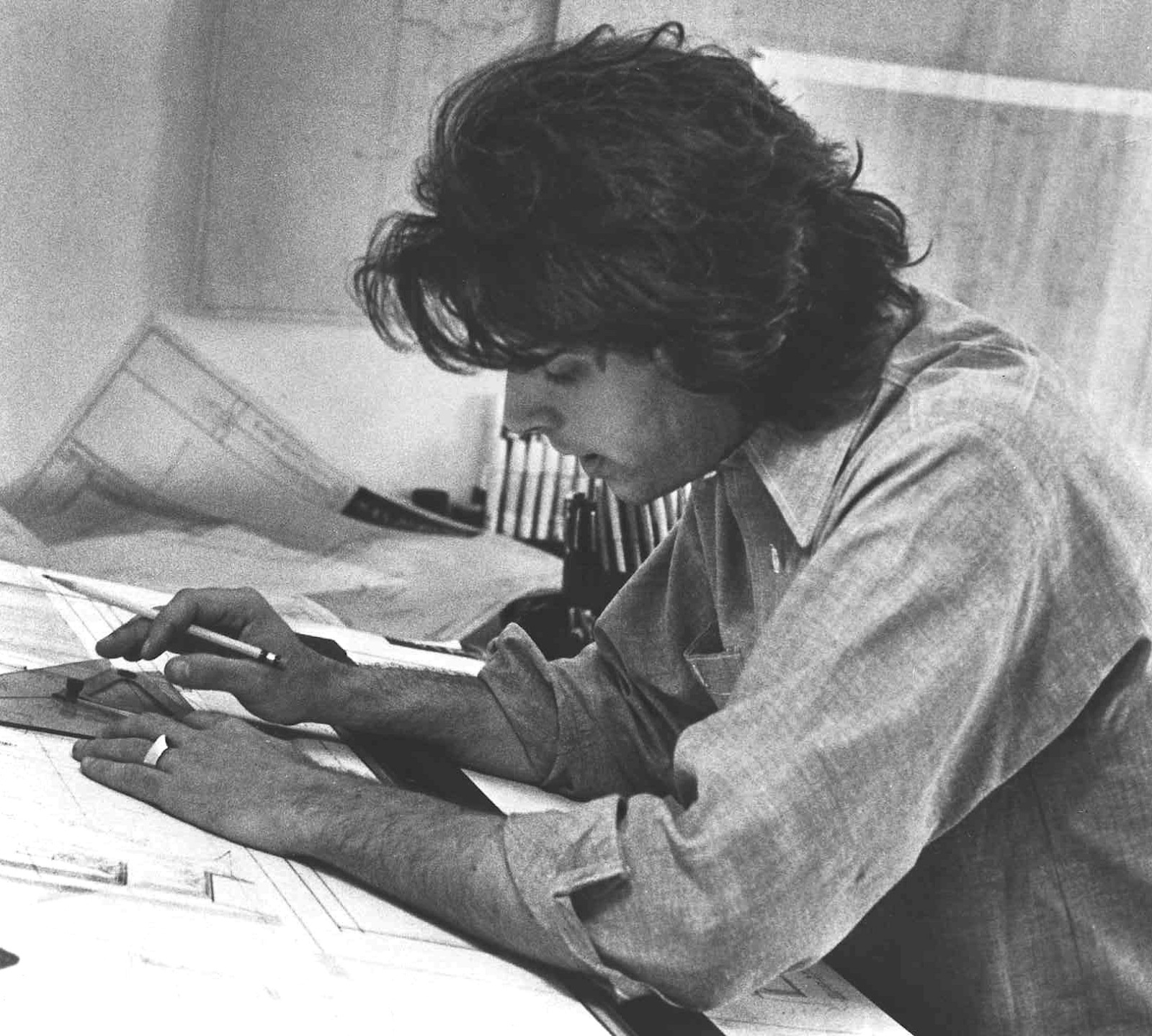
- Storyk at work
- Born: May 10, 1946 (age 80)
- Education: Princeton University
- Occupations: Architect and Principal at WSDG-Walters-Storyk Design Group
- Spouse: Beth Walters
- Website: https://wsdg.com/

John Storyk (born May 10, 1946) is a registered architect and acoustician who, together with wife and business partner Beth Walters, co-founded Walters-Storyk Design Group (WSDG). He began his career as an innovative recording studio designer in 1968 with Electric Lady Studios for Jimi Hendrix in New York City. Storyk and WSDG have produced the provided design, system integration, and construction supervision services for nearly 4000 professional audio recording and video production/post-production studios, performance venues, sports venues, houses of worship and educational facilities. His work includes private studios for Jay-Z, Bruce Springsteen, Alicia Keys, Whitney Houston, Bob Marley, Aerosmith, Green Day, Goo Goo Dolls and R. Kelly.

== Career ==
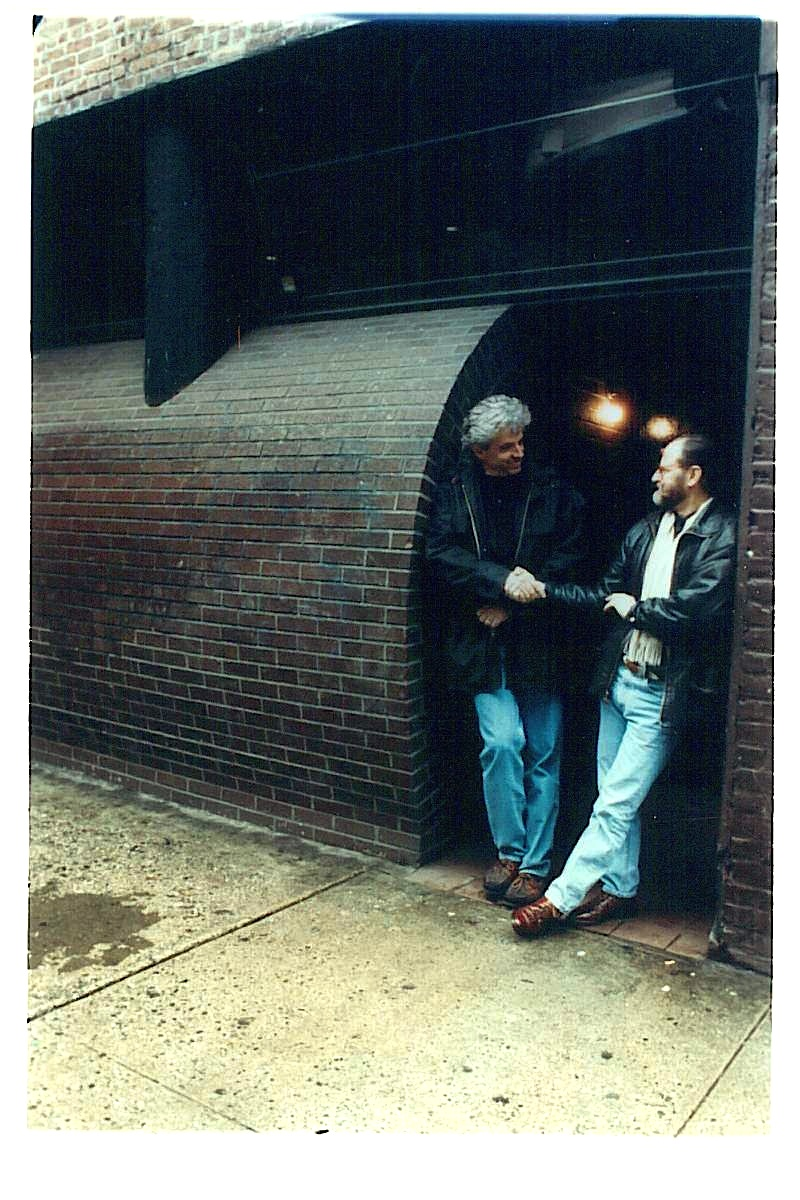
John Storyk and Eddie Kramer at Electric Lady Studios

As a musician and architecture student at Princeton and Columbia Universities, Storyk’s career has followed a pursuit of his two favorite subjects. After graduating from Princeton University in 1968, Storyk's first commission was for Jimi Hendrix's Electric Lady Studios in New York City's Greenwich Village, a studio that continues to be utilized by acts ranging from Adele to Daft Punk and Ed Sheeran.

John Storyk is a member of the American Institute of Architects (AIA) and the Audio Engineering Society (AES). He is a frequent contributor to AES Convention Panels and Papers. A recipient of the AES Fellowship Award, he lectures at schools around the U.S. and has established courses in acoustics at Yale University, Columbia, NYU, Ex’Pression College, San Francisco; Full Sail Center, Orlando; and Berklee College of Music. Committed to the support of pro audio education, Storyk also serves as an adjunct professor at the Berklee College of Music in Boston.

=== Walters-Storyk Design Group ===
In 1987, Storyk and his wife Beth Walters co-founded Walters-Storyk Design Group (WSDG). WSDG has produced the design and construction of over 3500 world-class audio and video production facilities, recording studios, radio stations, corporate media and conference rooms, educational, sports and entertainment facilities, clubs, restaurants and theaters. WSDG maintains a staff of fifty designers and engineers, and offices in New York City, Washington, D.C., San Francisco, Los Angeles, Miami, Buenos Aires, Belo Horizonte, Basel, Berlin, Beijing, Barcelona, Mexico City, Mumbai, and St. Petersburg.

WSDG recording studio credits include Alicia Keys' and Ann Mincieli's Jungle City Studios a $6+ million New York City ‘Destination Studio’ completed in 2011, which was featured in the New York Times and Vanity Fair, and recognized with a TEC Award. In 2013, multi-Grammy and Academy Award-winning producer Paul Epworth utilized WSDG for the renovation of The Church Studios in London. WSDG-designed 55TEC Studios in Beijing opened in May 2017, producing nearly a dozen China Top-ten hits in its first ten months, including six #1’s. Storyk and WSDG's credits range from large recording facilities in Kuala Lumpur to New York City’s Jazz at Lincoln Center performance complex, Le Poisson Rouge and Feinstein's/54 Below, to studios in Argentina, Brazil, Europe and China.

WSDG broadcast facility design credits include architecture and/or audio-acoustic planning and design for CBS, WNET, and Food Network in New York City, TSR Broadcasting in Geneva, UPC Broadcasting in Amsterdam, VGTRK All-Russia State Television and Radio Broadcasting Company in Moscow, and, in partnership with ARTEC Consultants, the audio studios at Jazz at Lincoln Center, now operating as XM Broadcasting facilities. Storyk also designed MJH Studios in Cranbury, New Jersey.

WSDG educational facility design credits include distance-learning facilities for Hunter College in New York City (2016), the Ross School in East Hampton, New York, the $6.8 million NYU Steinhardt James L. Dolan Recording/Teaching/Research Complex in New York City (2009), the Berklee Music Education/Production Complex at 160 Massachusetts Avenue in Boston (2014), Berklee Valencia in Valencia, Spain (2012), Drexel University in Philadelphia, Pennsylvania (2017), Rensselaer Polytechnic Institute in Troy, New York (2018), ICESI University in Cali, Colombia (2020), and Concordia University Irvine in Irvine, California (2020).

=== Notable projects ===
- Electric Lady Studios - New York City, USA
- Jazz at Lincoln Center - New York City, USA
- Synchrosound Studios - Kuala Lumpur, Malaysia
- Swiss Parliament - Bern, Switzerland
- Jungle City Studios - New York City, USA
- Maracanã Stadium - Rio de Janeiro, Brazil
- Mineirao Stadium - Belo Horizonte, Brazil
- Diante do Trono recording studio - Belo Horizonte, Brazil
- Circo Beat studio - Buenos Aires, Argentina
- Javeriana University - Bogota, Colombia
- Berklee Valencia - Valencia, Spain
- Oven Studios (Alicia Keys) - New York City, USA
- Roc the Mic Studios (Jay Z) - New York City, USA
- Mad Oak Studios - Boston, USA
- Food Network - New York City, USA
- MTV - Buenos Aires, Argentina
- TV Globo - Rio de Janeiro, Brazil
- Qatar Television - Doha, Qatar
- Zurich Airport - Zurich, Switzerland
- Faena Hotel+Universe - Buenos Aires, Argentina
- NYU - New York City, USA
- Art Institute - United States
- Le Poisson Rouge - New York City, USA
- Murray Arts Center] - Atlanta, USA
- Central Synagogue - New York City, USA
- Iglesia Los Olivos - Buenos Aires, Argentina
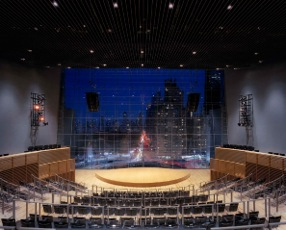
Jazz at Lincoln Center's Allen Room in New York, USA

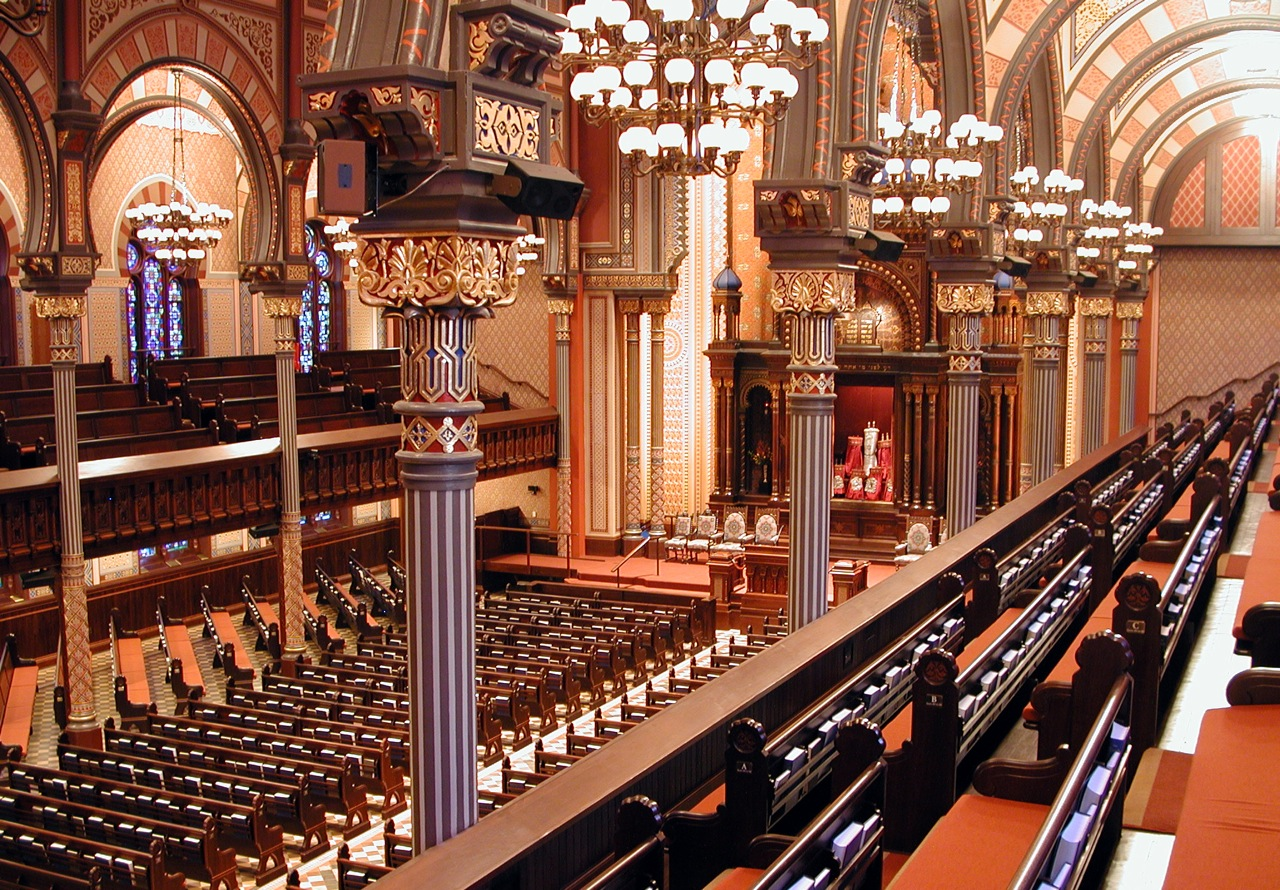
Central Synagogue in New York, USA

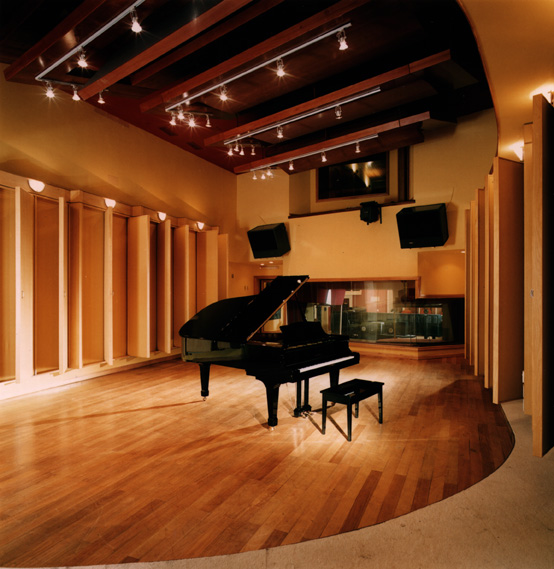
Circo Beat Studios in Buenos Aires, Argentina

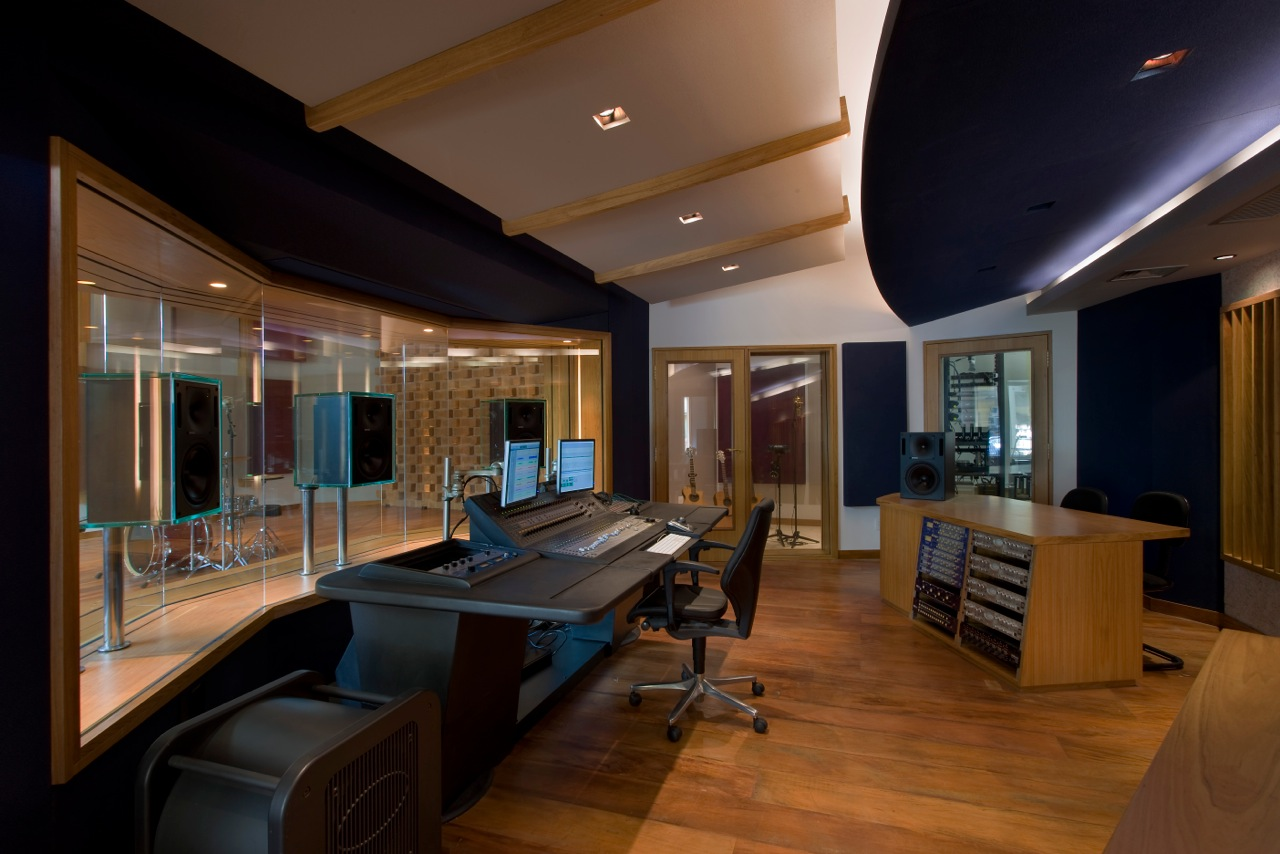
Diante Do Trono in Belo Horizonte, Brazil

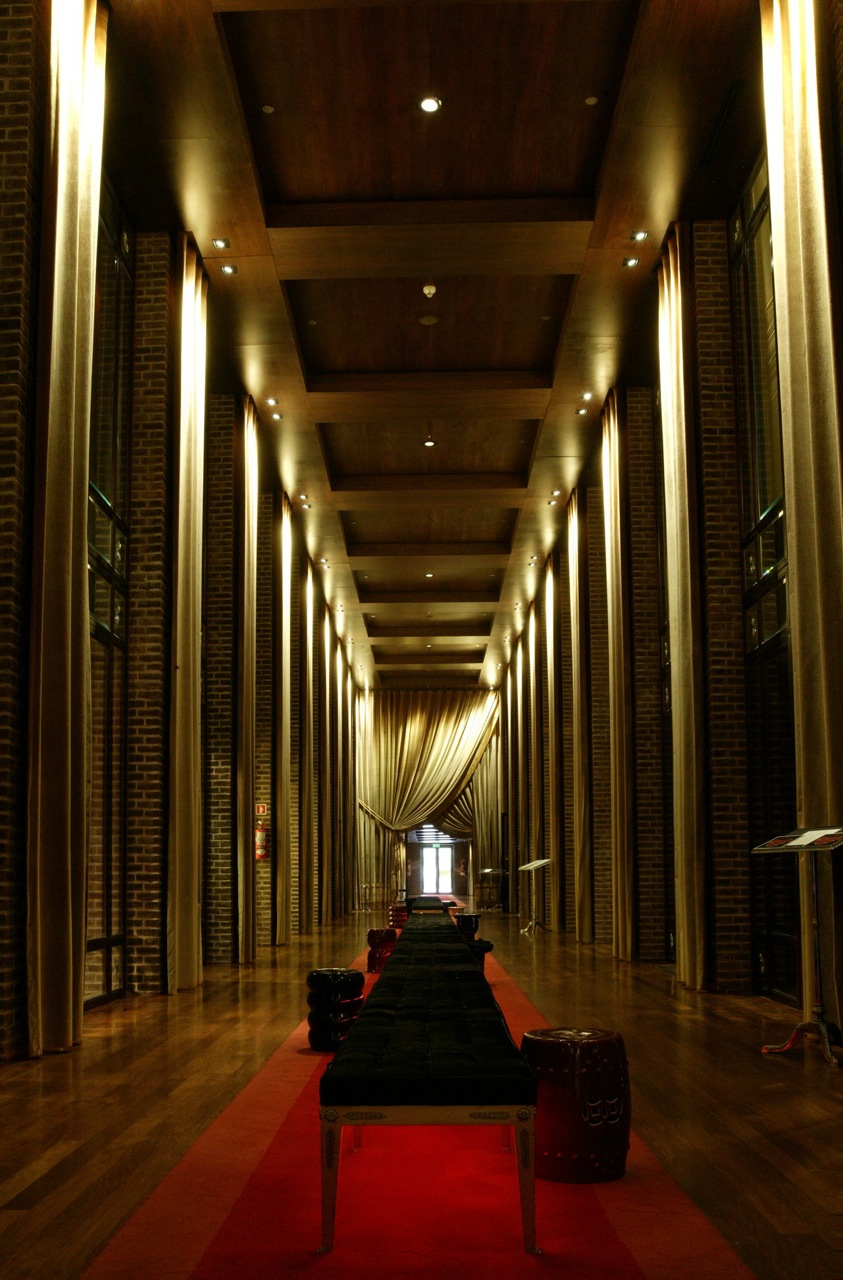
Faena Hotel + Universe in Buenos Aires, Argentina

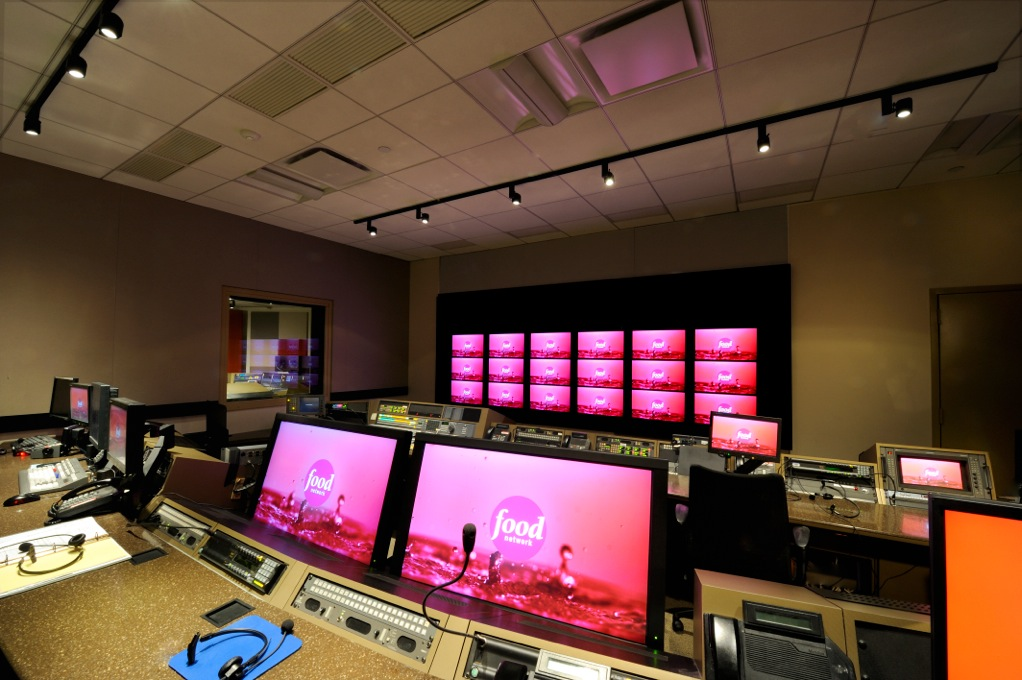
Food Network Master Control Room in New York, USA

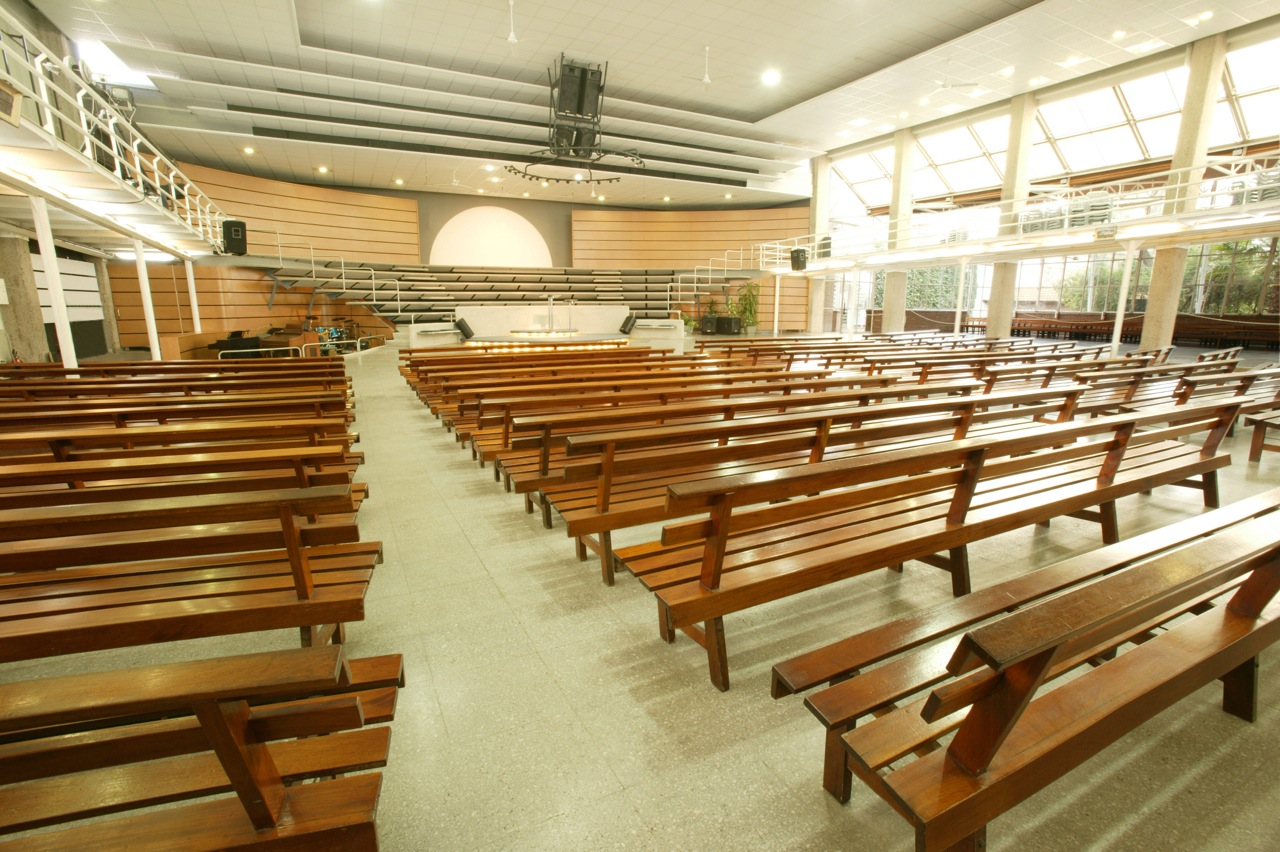
Iglesia Los Olivos in Buenos Aires, Argentina

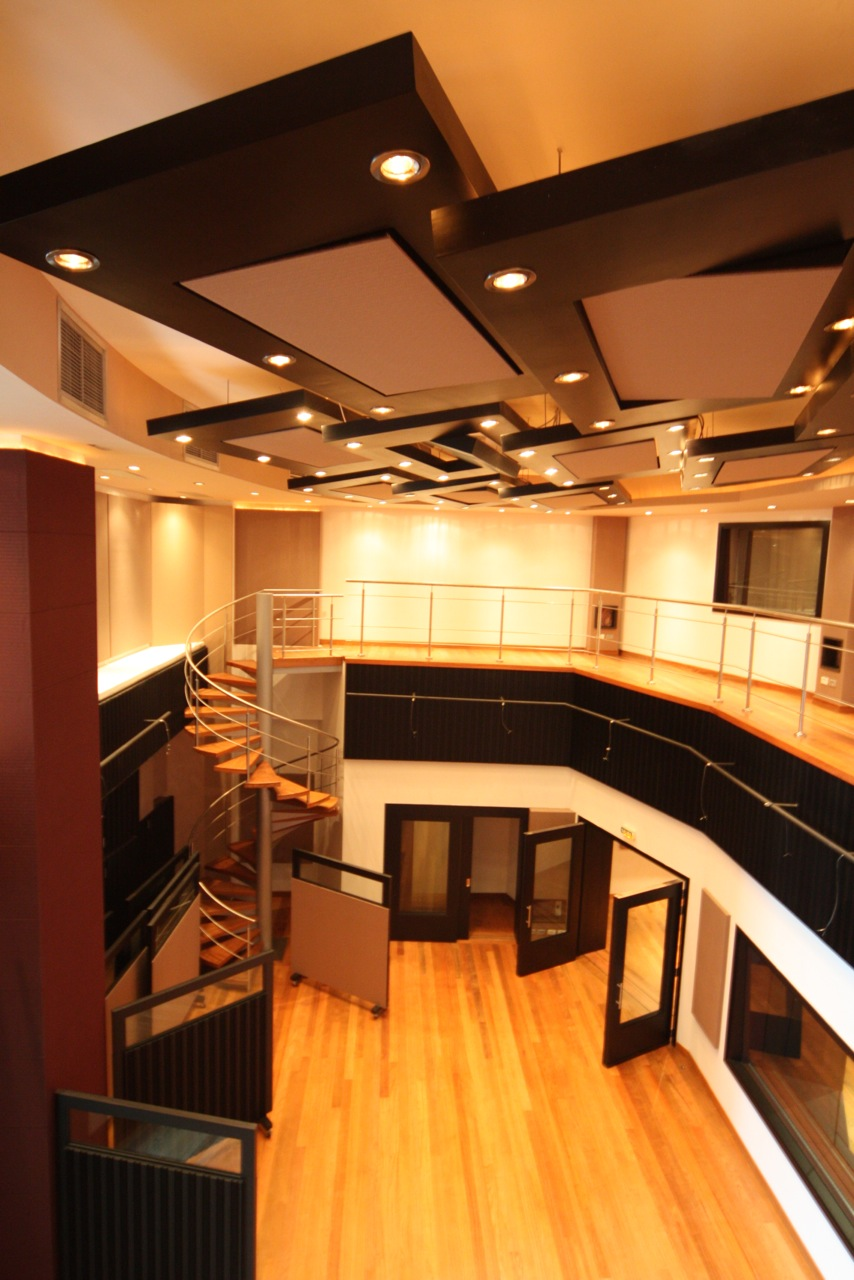
Javeriana University - Atico - Studio A in Bogotá, Colombia

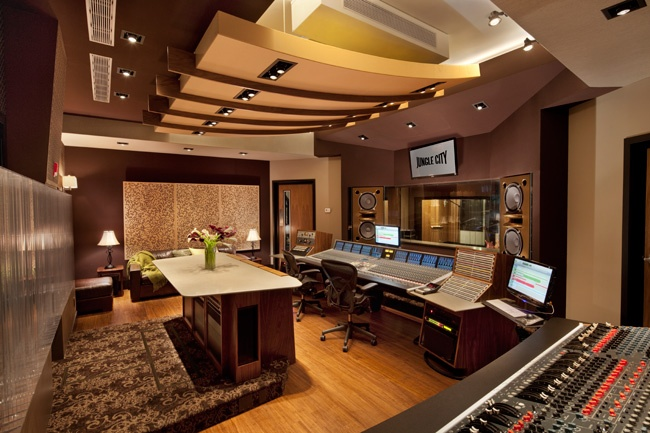
Jungle City Studios in New York, USA

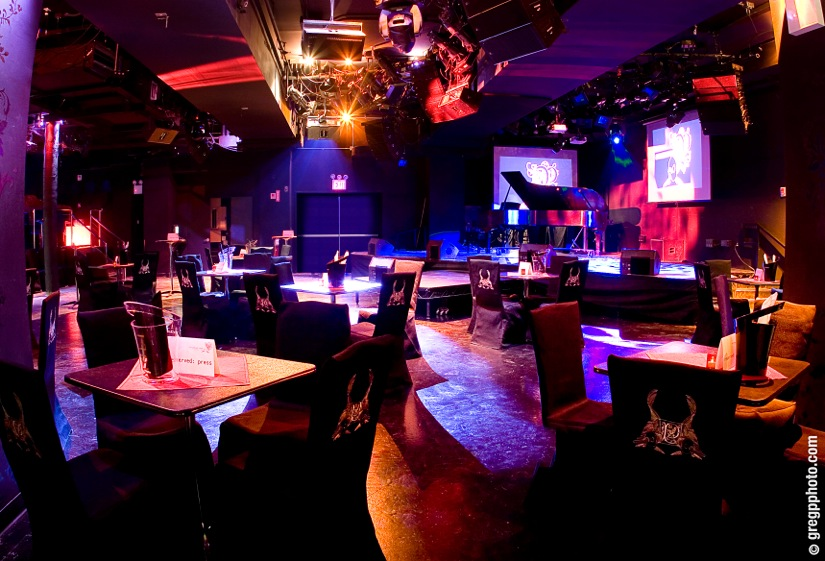
Le Poisson Rouge in New York, USA

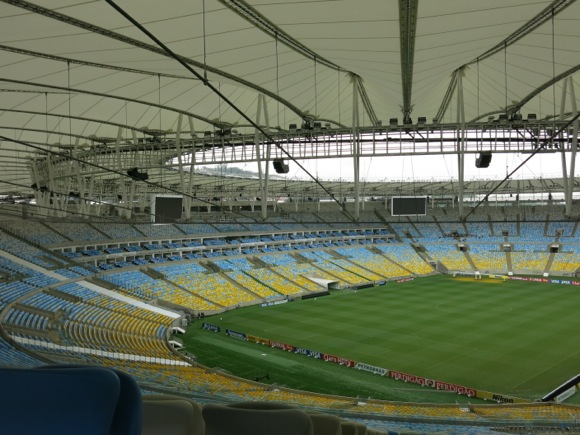
Maracanã Stadium in Rio de Janeiro, Brazil

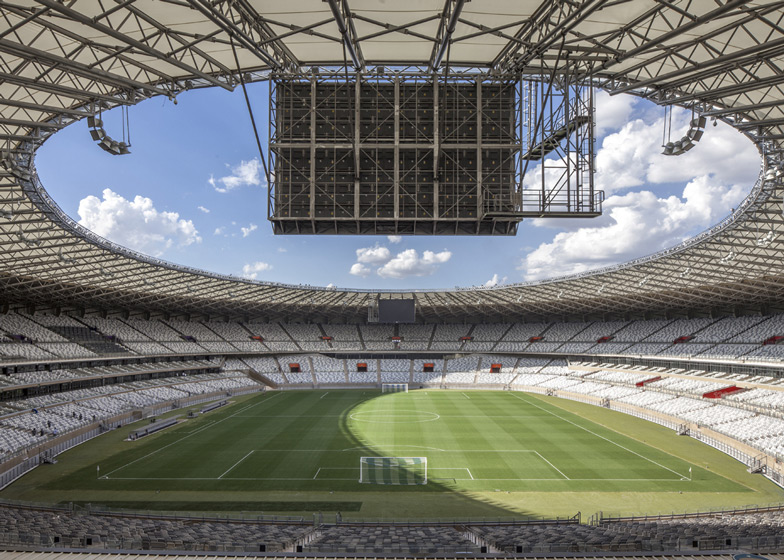
Mineirao Stadium in Belo Horizonte, Brazil

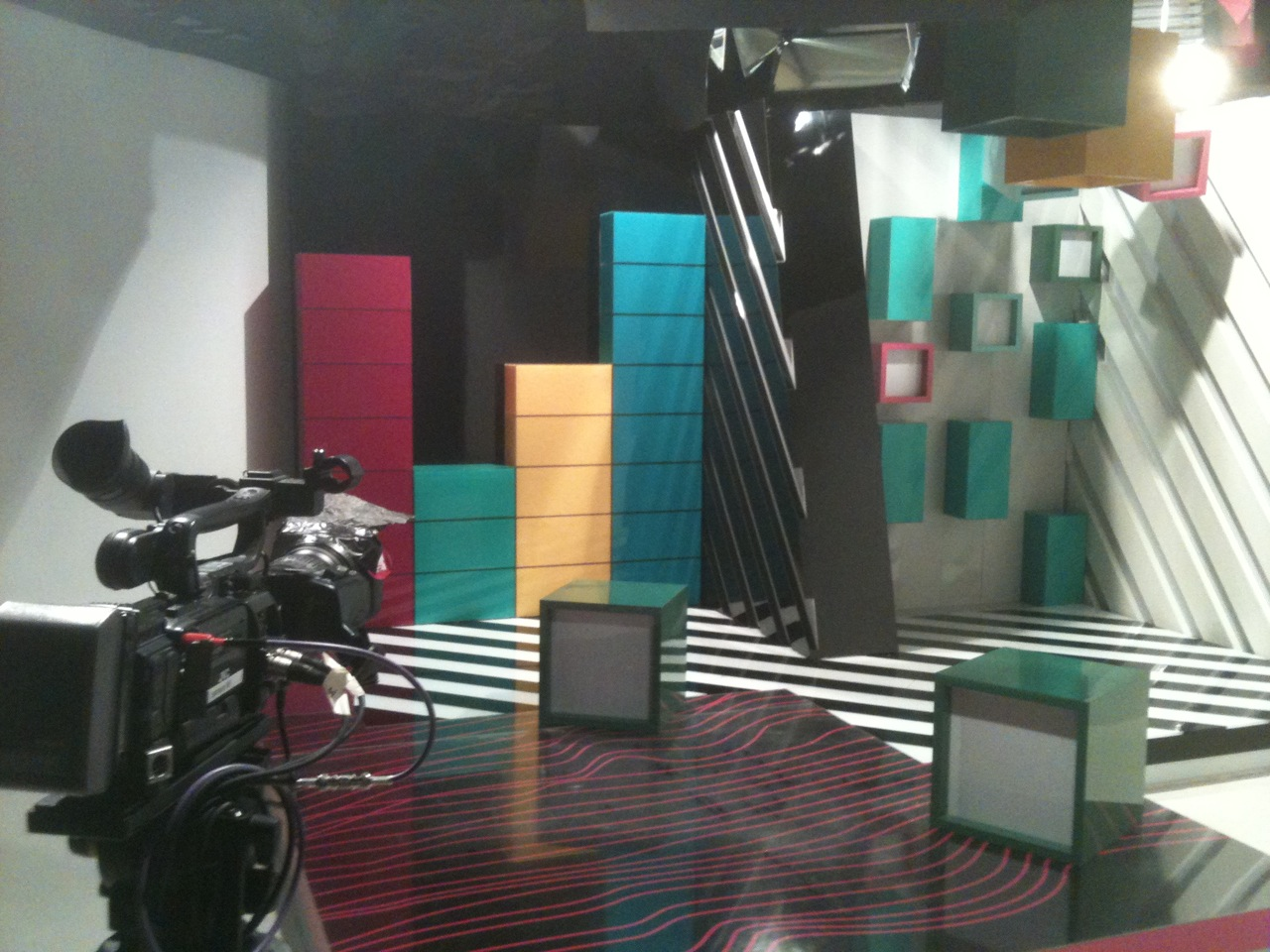
MTV TV set in Buenos Aires, Argentina

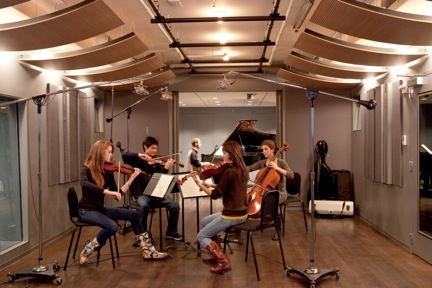
NYU Studios in New York, USA

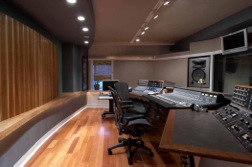
Oven Studios - Alicia Keys in New York, USA

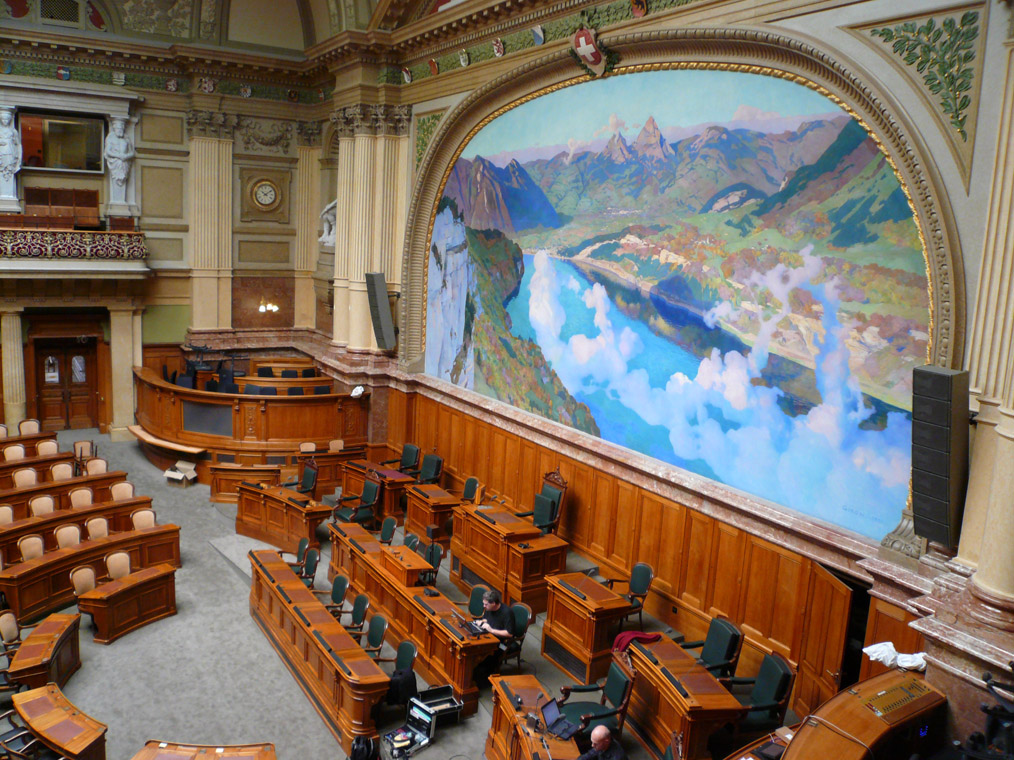
Swiss Parliament in Basel, Switzerland

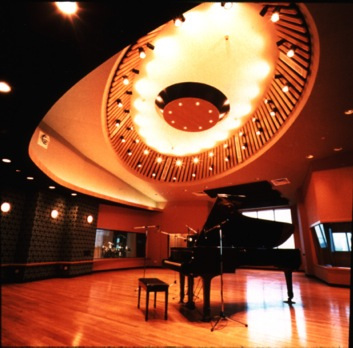
Synchrosound - Studio A in Kuala Lumpur, Malaysia

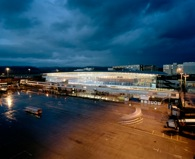
Zurich Airport - Exterior in Switzerland

=== Awards and recognition ===
WSDG is an eleven-time winner of the TEC Award for outstanding achievement in Acoustics/Facility Design, and since the debut of the TEC Awards in 1985, thirty WSDG studio design projects have been nominated (including four multiple-entry nominations).

- 2015 Berklee College of Music, 160 Massachusetts Avenue, Boston, United States
- 2016 The Church Studios, London, England
- 2017 Boston Symphony Orchestra Control Room, Boston, United States

== Marriage and children ==
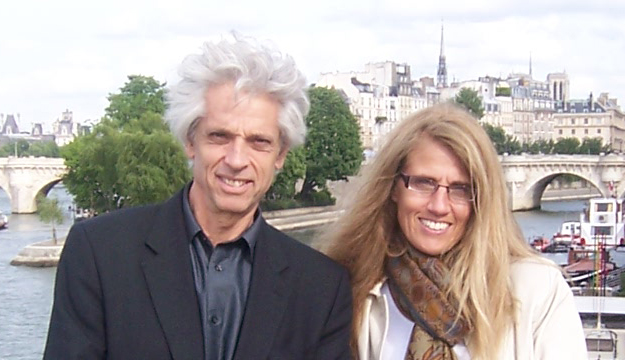
John Storyk and Beth Walters

Storyk is married to his business and life partner Beth Walters. The couple raised two sons in Highland, New York and now live in Highland and the Yucatán Coast in Mexico.
