= T.R.I.P. (album) =

2017 album by The Lights Out

Studio album by The Lights Out
- Released: February 1, 2017
- Genre: Rock
- Label: Self-released
- Producer: Benny Grotto

T.R.I.P. (pronounced "trip") is the fourth full-length album from The Lights Out. It was pre-released on November 12, 2016, on specially-formulated cans of craft beer brewed by Aeronaut Brewing Co., with its released digitally on February 1, 2017.

The album is a collection of stories about traveling through alternate dimensions, with every song presented as a report back from another reality The Lights Out has visited. The beer can, meanwhile, contains a set of instructions for drinkers to take over the phenomenon of the social media, a phenomenon that triggered a response from the band, telling the drinker what an alternate reflection of themselves is doing right now in a parallel world; the instructions are accompanied by a link to the album's digital site.

The beer is an Imperial Session IPA crafted to pair with the music.

T.R.I.P. is an acronym for The Reckonings In Pandimensionality. It is the first studio album ever released on a can of beer. With T.R.I.P, the band is reportedly aiming to reintroduce the physical discovery of music that they feel has been lost in the digital age and create a full sensory experience for the listener.

== Track listing ==
1. "T.R.I.P."
2. "The Last American Virgin"
3. "Waves of Sound"
4. "Layin Down the Law"
5. "I Dreamed of You Again"
6. "Lies"
7. "The Undertaker"
8. "A Cosmic Gardener"
9. "Cruel Enough"
10. "Making a Better Girl"
