= Small Stone Records =

American record label

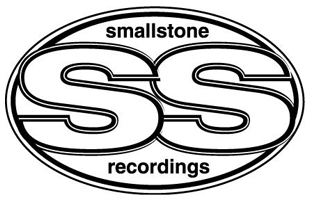
- Founded: 1995
- Founder: Scott Hamilton
- Status: Active
- Distributors: All That is Heavy; Alliance Entertainment Corporation (USA); Allegro/Nail (USA); Bertus (Benelux); Cargo Records GmBH (Germany); Carrot Top Records (USA); GMR Music Group (Sweden); Sonic Unyon (Canada); ShellShock Distribution (UK)
- Genre: Stoner rock; Indie rock; Acid rock; Psychedelic rock; Rock and roll; Southern rock; Alternative rock; Blues rock
- Country of origin: United States
- Location: Detroit, MI
- Official website: www.smallstone.com

Small Stone Records is an American record label based in Detroit, MI. It was founded in 1995 by Scott Hamilton and is a self-dubbed "heavy rock" label. The label has released a number of stoner rock compilation albums, as well as releases by Dozer, Los Natas, Halfway To Gone, Solace, and many others in the stoner rock, indie, blues-rock, and psychedelic genres.

== History ==
Small Stone Records was founded in Detroit, Michigan by Scott Hamilton in 1995, who remains owner and operator. Hamilton claims he mostly started the label to put out records by friends and his favorite bands such as Big Chief, The Laughing Hyenas, Mule, and Slot. Hamilton started the label with a $5000 loan and named it after the Small Stone effects pedal made by Electro-Harmonix.

The label's first release was a single by 36-D, which had members of Big Chief, Born Without a Face, and Slot. The label's first album release was a 1995 compilation titled Detroit Rust City, which sold 1,000 copies the first week, and featured Kid Rock and Big Chief. Shortly afterward the label released Morsel's sophomore EP. In 1997 the label released an album by Perplexa, a band which included a member from WIG, who later went on to become West Indian Girl. Five Horse Johnson also signed to the label that year. The label initially featured a number of different rock genres but soon began focusing on the blues rock, psychedelic rock and stoner rock genres, and what Hamilton dubs "heavy rock."

Besides albums by groups such as Acid King, Dozer, Greenleaf, and Los Natas, the label has released a number of stoner rock compilations. The first, Right in the Nuts: A Tribute to Aerosmith, featured covers of Aerosmith, and was released in 2000. In January 2002, the label released Sucking the 70s, a two disc collection of 1970s songs covered by stoner rock bands. In 2006, the label released the compilation Sucking the 70's - Back in the Saddle Again, which featured covers of various 1970s songs.

According to Hamilton, early on the Small Stone bands relied on networking with other bands on the label to organize tours and musical projects. In 2006, Small Stone began issuing the lost recordings of the band Slot, whose founder and guitarist had recently died. Remaining members of the band Sue Lott (bass) and Eddie Alterman (drums) were then joined by Phil Durr of Five Horse Johnson and Scott Hamilton on guitar to play at SXSW in the spring of 2007. The new reformation soon garnered Five Horse Johnson drummer Eric Miller, and formed the band Luder. Their first album, Sonoluminescence, was released on Small Stone in November 2009. Reviews dubbed the style "grunge-gaze."

The label continues to put out approximately 10 to 12 new releases a year. Small Stone's newer bands, such as Lo-Pan, Backwoods Payback, and Freedom Hawk continue to maintain busy touring schedules.

Small Stone records is sometimes referred to as the "new home" for Man's Ruin bands. Acts like Acid King, Los Natas, Dozer, Sons Of Otis, Tummler, and Men Of Porn were picked up by Small Stone after the demise of the Man's Ruin record label (Some of those earlier Man's Ruin records have since been reissued by Small Stone, most notably the albums by Dozer, Acid King, and Sons Of Otis).

Beginning in February 2014, Small Stone Records entered into a distribution agreement with Alternative Distribution Alliance.

== Artists who have signed to Small Stone Records ==
- Abrahma
- Acid King
- All Time High
- Antler
- Asteroid
- A Thousand Knives of Fire
- Axehandle
- Backwoods Payback
- Blackwolfgoat
- Black Sleep of Kali
- Bottom
- Brain Police
- The Brought Low
- Deville
- Dixie Witch
- Dozer
- Dwellers
- Erik Larson
- Five Horse Johnson
- Fireball Ministry
- Freedom Hawk
- Gozu
- Greatdayforup
- Giant Brain
- Gideon Smith & the Dixie Damned
- The Glasspack
- Greenleaf
- Hackman
- Halfway to Gone
- Honky
- House of Broken Promises
- Infernal Overdrive
- Iota
- Ironweed
- Isaak
- It's Not Night: It's Space
- Jeremy Irons & the Ratgang Malibus
- LaChinga
- Larman Clamor
- Lo-Pan
- Lord Fowl
- Lord Sterling
- Los Natas
- Luder
- Mangoo
- Medusa Cyclone
- Mellow Bravo
- Mother of God
- Milligram
- Miss Lava
- Mog Stunt Team
- Morsel
- Mos Generator
- Neon Warship
- Nightstalker
- Novadriver
- Obiat
- The Men of Porn
- Puny Human
- Red Giant
- Roadsaw
- Roundhead
- Sasquatch
- Shame Club
- Slot
- Skånska Mord
- SNAIL
- Solace
- Soul Clique
- Sun Gods In Exile
- Supermachine
- Suplecs
- The Might Could
- The Socks
- Throttlerod
- Tia Carrera
- Tummler
- VALIS
- Whitey Morgan and the 78's
- Wo Fat
- ZUN
- 36D

== See also ==
- List of record labels
