= Color Machine =

2009 album by The Lights Out

Studio album by The Lights Out
- Released: September 2009
- Recorded: 2009
- Genre: Rock
- Length: 45:36
- Label: Self-Released
- Producer: Jason Dunn

The Lights Out chronology
¡Heist! (2008)	Color Machine (2009)

Color Machine is an album by Boston-based rock group The Lights Out inspired from the tracks on their EPs, The Lights Out and ¡Heist!. It was self-released in September 2009.

== Reception ==
The album received positive reviews and listings from publications and websites such as

- The Boston Phoenix
- The Boston Globe
- The Boston Herald
- The Music Slut
- Playground Boston

== Track listing ==
1. "Money Or Time"
2. "Gottagetouttahere"
3. "Red Letter Day"
4. "Liquid"
5. "Five Seventeen"
6. "Never Going Back"
7. "Ms. Fortune"
8. "Stormy"
9. "Count Me Out"
10. "Get Up Get Up"
11. "Last Hurrah"
12. "New Gets Old"
13. "Danny Partridge"

== The Lights Out (EP) ==
The Lights Out (EP)

EP by The Lights Out
- Released: 2007
- Recorded: 2007
- Genre: Rock
- Label: Self-Released
- Producer: Jason Dunn

The Lights Out is an EP by The Lights Out, self-released in 2007. The majority of the songs were later used to create Color Machine.

=== Track listing ===
1. "Make Me"
2. "Count Me Out"
3. "Miss Fortune"
4. "Last Hurrah"

== ¡Heist! (EP) ==
¡Heist!

EP by The Lights Out
- Released: 2008
- Recorded: 2008
- Genre: Rock
- Label: Self-Released
- Producer: Jason Dunn

¡Heist! is an EP by The Lights Out, self-released in 2008. The majority of the songs were later used to create Color Machine.

=== Track listing ===
1. "Money Or Time"
2. "Liquid"
3. "Never Going Back"
4. "Get Up Get Up"
5. "New Gets Old"
