= Sasquatch (band) =

American rock band

- Origin: Los Angeles, California, U.S.
- Genres: Stoner rock; post-grunge
- Years active: 2001–present
- Labels: Small Stone; Mad Oak
- Members: Keith Gibbs; Craig Riggs; Jason Casanova
- Past members: Clayton Charles; Rick Ferrante
- Website: sasquatchrock.us

Sasquatch is an American rock band formed in 2001 in Los Angeles, California by Keith Gibbs, Rick Ferrante and Clayton Charles. Charles left the band in 2007 and was replaced by Jason Casanova. In 2017, Craig Riggs of Roadsaw became a full-time member after the departure of Ferrante. The band claims to be influenced by "Black Sabbath, old Soundgarden, Deliverance-era Corrosion of Conformity, Mountain, and a bastardized version of Grand Funk Railroad."

== Band members ==
- Keith Gibbs – guitar, vocals (2001–present)
- Jason Casanova – bass (2007–present)
- Craig Riggs – drums (2017–present)

Former members

- Rick Ferrante – drums (2001–2017)
- Clayton Charles – bass (2001–2007)

== Discography ==
- 2004: Sasquatch
- 2006: II
- 2010: III
- 2013: IV
- 2017: Maneuvers
- 2022: Fever Fantasy
