= Oddzar =

American rock band

- Origin: Columbia, Maryland, United States
- Genres: Rock, progressive rock
- Years active: 1999–2010
- Labels: DCide
- Past members: Russ Eckell; Greg Loman; Trevor Olexy; Blake Silvea; David Nenner; Greg Jung; Travis Lockhart; Ellis Tinsley

Oddzar was an American rock band formed in 1999 in Columbia, Maryland. Their original line-up consisted of high school friends Russ Eckell (vocals), David Nenner (guitar), Travis Lockhart (bass), and Blake Silvea (drums).

The four were heavily influenced by funk metal bands such as Red Hot Chili Peppers and Rage Against the Machine, as well as Pearl Jam. Shortly after their formation, Nenner left the group to form Truth Be Told and was replaced by Greg Jung in 2000.

The quartet reworked their style, drawing from influences such as Tool and Muse. "We felt a need to avoid musical trends such as pop-punk, emo, and rap-metal," said Eckell. In 2002, the band was signed to DCide Records of Nothingface fame. The group began working on their self-titled debut, produced and engineered by Drew Mazurek (Linkin Park). Oddzar was released in 2004, four months after Greg Jung’s departure from the band in May. He was replaced by Greg Loman.

“Abandoned Road” and "Spell," songs from the first album were featured on MTV’s Road Rules in 2005.

In 2005, Travis Lockhart left Oddzar to pursue other interests. The band used Ellis Tinsley as a stand-in bassist before settling on University of Maryland student Trevor Olexy as their fourth member.

On November 19, 2007, Oddzar released a demo from their then untitled second album. The song was entitled "Ready the Chariot" and explored more progressive terrain than their earlier work.

In 2008 "Until it Does" a song from Oddzar's first album was used in the soundtrack of the eighth episode of The Real World: Hollywood, "Arrival and Departure."

Oddzar recorded their second album, tentatively entitled 'Rise' in late April 2008 at Mad Oak Studios in Allston, Massachusetts. The record was produced by Evan Anderson and engineered and mixed by Benny Grotto. The record was mastered in late September 2008 at Peerless Mastering (also in Boston). It has been scheduled to be released on January 29, 2009 under the name 'Ready the Chariot'.

On October 1, 2008, Oddzar released a track from their forthcoming records called "D.O.D. (Dogs of Demikhov)" on their Myspace page.

AllMusic has said the band is "well worth keeping an eye on".
