= Rock Pony =

Rockpony

EP by The Lights Out
- Released: 2010
- Recorded: 2010
- Genre: Rock
- Label: Self-Released
- Producer: Graeme Hall

Rock Pony is an EP by Boston-based rock group The Lights Out. Self-released in 2010, it contains four previously unreleased fixtures of the band’s live repertoire, and was recorded at the BU Center for Digital Imaging Arts in Waltham, MA, by Graeme Hall, Serge Espitia and Ryan Meyer. The album’s cover, featuring a centaur woman wielding a Gibson Les Paul, caused a stir.

== Track listing ==
1. Back Down
2. Do Yourself a Favor
3. Seven Days
4. Make Me
