= Douglas Sessions '05 =

Studio album by The Lights Out
- Released: 2005
- Recorded: 2005
- Genre: Rock
- Label: Self-Released
- Producer: Dave Minehan

The Douglas Sessions ’05 is the debut album by Boston-based rock group The Lights Out. It was self-released in 2005.

== Track listing ==
1. "Pride and Shame"
2. "Cant"
3. "Sorry for Saying I'm Sorry"
4. "Western Pariah"
5. "Hostile Takeover"
6. "If I Had a Hi Fi"
7. "100 Hours in L.A."
8. "Time for Moving On"
9. "Pink and Purple"
10. "Wrong as I can Be"
11. "Redshift Blues"
