= Big Trouble in Little China =

1986 film directed by John Carpenter

- Theatrical release poster by Drew Struzan
- Directed by: John Carpenter
- Written by: Gary Goldman; David Z. Weinstein
- Adaptation by: W. D. Richter
- Produced by: Larry J. Franco
- Starring: Kurt Russell; Kim Cattrall; Dennis Dun
- Cinematography: Dean Cundey
- Edited by: Steve Mirkovich; Mark Warner; Edward A. Warschilka
- Music by: John Carpenter; Alan Howarth
- Production company: 20th Century Fox
- Distributed by: 20th Century Fox
- Release date: July 2, 1986
- Running time: 99 minutes
- Country: United States
- Language: English
- Budget: $19–25 million
- Box office: $11.1 million

Big Trouble in Little China (also known as John Carpenter's Big Trouble in Little China) is a 1986 American fantasy action comedy film directed by John Carpenter, and starring Kurt Russell, Kim Cattrall, Dennis Dun and James Hong. The film tells the story of truck driver Jack Burton (Russell), who helps his friend Wang Chi (Dun) rescue Wang's green-eyed fiancée from bandits in San Francisco's Chinatown. They go into the mysterious underworld beneath Chinatown, where they face an ancient sorcerer named David Lo Pan (Hong), who requires a woman with green eyes to marry him in order to be released from a centuries-old curse.

Although the original screenplay by first-time screenwriters Gary Goldman and David Z. Weinstein was envisioned as a Western set in the 1880s, screenwriter W. D. Richter was hired to rewrite the script extensively and modernize it. The studio hired Carpenter to direct the film and rushed Big Trouble in Little China into production so that it would be released before a similarly themed Eddie Murphy film, The Golden Child, which was slated to come out around the same time. The project fulfilled Carpenter's long-standing desire to make a martial arts film.

Despite receiving generally positive reviews, the film was a commercial failure, grossing $11.1 million in North America, below its estimated $19 to $25 million budget. This left Carpenter disillusioned with Hollywood and influenced his decision to return to independent filmmaking. In later years, the film gained a steady audience on home video.

== Plot ==
Jack Burton is driving his semi-trailer truck, nicknamed the Pork Chop Express, while narrating a monologue over the Citizens band radio (CB). He arrives at an outdoor market, drinking and gambling throughout the night. In the morning, Jack wins a bet with Wang Chi in a game of reflexes. To make sure he follows through on payment, Jack accompanies Wang to meet his fiancée Miao Yin at the airport, where they are confronted by Lords of Death gang members, who capture Miao Yin for her green eyes.

Jack and Wang track the gang to Chinatown, where they encounter a funeral procession which erupts into battle between the Chang Sing and Wing Kong, two ancient Chinese warrior societies. Three supernatural warriors with weather-themed powers appear: Thunder, Rain and Lightning (known as the Three Storms). Jack attempts to drive away, but seems to run over Lo Pan, a magician standing behind the Storms. However, Lo Pan is somehow unhurt. Wang and Jack escape through the alleys, but Jack's truck is stolen.

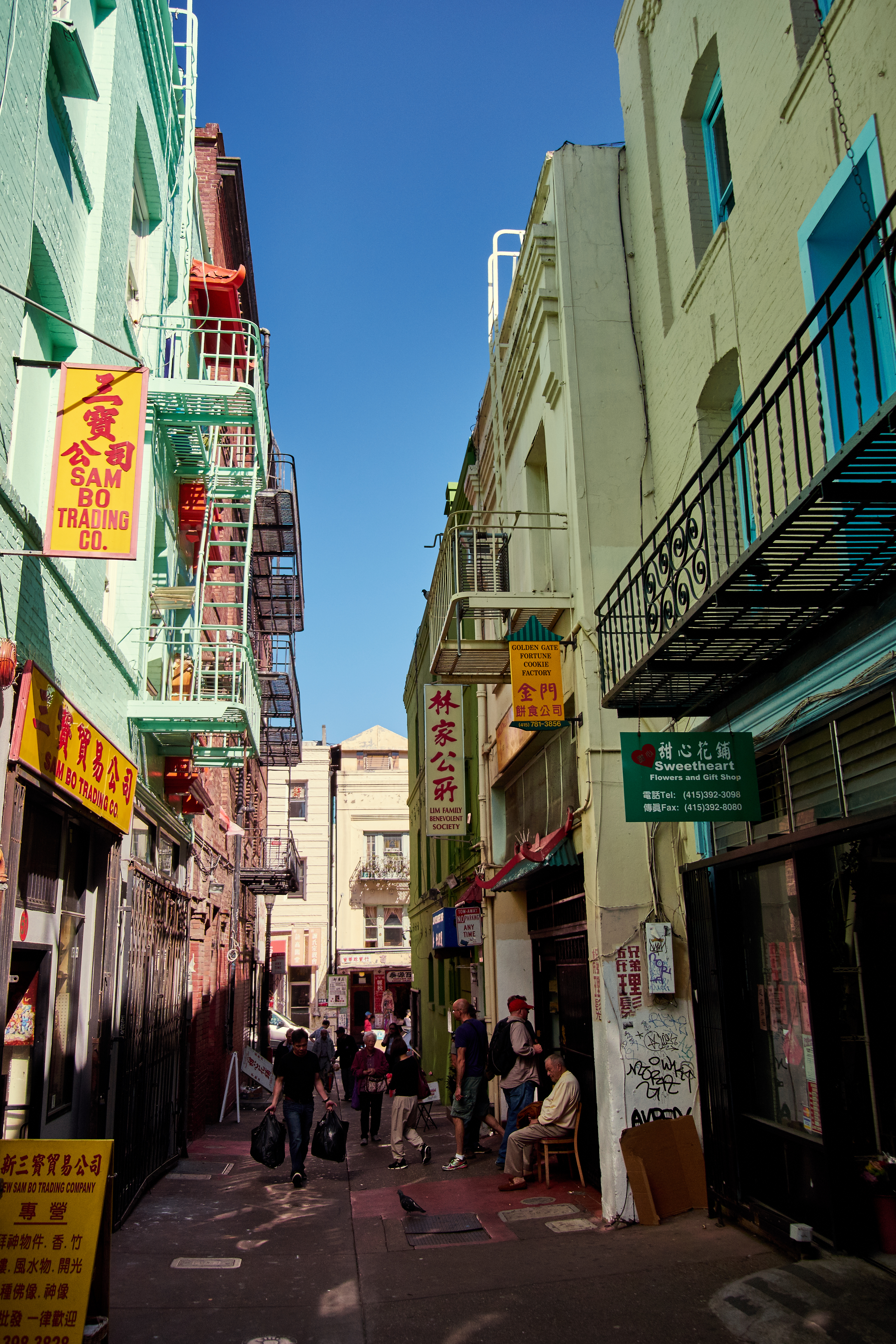
Ross Alley in San Francisco, where Jack's sharp right turn was filmed

Wang takes Jack to his restaurant, where they meet Wang's friend Eddie Lee, Gracie Law and her journalist friend Margo. The group devises a plan to infiltrate a brothel, where they believe Miao Yin is held captive. They break in, but are interrupted by the Storms, who capture Miao Yin and bring her to Lo Pan.

Jack and Wang track down the front business used by Lo Pan and impersonate telephone repairmen to gain access, but are quickly subdued by Rain. After being tied up and beaten, they meet Lo Pan. He now appears as David Lo Pan, an elderly and feeble businessman. Jack and Wang's friends attempt to save them and are also captured.

Locked in a cell, Wang tells Jack that Lo Pan needs a green-eyed girl to break an ancient curse, and he intends to sacrifice Miao Yin. Centuries ago, Lo Pan was defeated in battle by Emperor Qin Shi Huang, who cursed Lo Pan with incorporeality. Lo Pan can temporarily obtain a decrepit body by supplication to the gods, but he must marry and sacrifice Miao Yin to fully lift his curse. They eventually escape, and free Gracie, Margo and a group of women kept in cells, but a Wild-Man creature grabs Gracie before she escapes. Lo Pan notes that Gracie also has green eyes and decides to sacrifice her while making Miao Yin his wife. Wang and Jack regroup with the Chang Sing warriors and Egg Shen, a powerful magician, and enter a cavern to return to Lo Pan's headquarters. Before the final battle, Egg Shen pours the group a potent potion, which boosts their confidence for the upcoming battle.

They interrupt the wedding at Lo Pan's lair and begin fighting. Jack accidentally knocks himself out, while Wang engages Rain in a sword duel. Lo Pan draws some of Miao Yin's blood and consumes it, regaining his corporeal form. Jack eventually regains consciousness and joins the fight. Lo Pan recognizes Egg Shen and they engage in a magic duel. Lo Pan and Thunder escape the lair with Miao Yin as the fighting continues. Wang is able to kill Rain, while Jack rescues Gracie. They regroup and confront Lo Pan further into his headquarters. Wang fights Thunder hand-to-hand, while Jack and Gracie rescue Miao Yin. Jack throws his knife at Lo Pan and misses, but when Lo Pan throws the knife back at Jack, he catches it and instantly throws it into Lo Pan's forehead, killing him.

Upon finding Lo Pan dead, Thunder swells up with rage and explodes. Jack, Wang, Gracie, and Miao Yin are cornered in a corridor by Lightning, who triggers a collapse of the lair. They are rescued by Egg, who drops a stone statue on Lightning, killing him. The group escape back to Wang's restaurant in Jack's truck, where they celebrate. With his old enemy defeated, Egg takes a long overdue vacation. Wang and Miao Yin prepare to marry, while Eddie pairs with Margo. Gracie offers to join Jack, but he declines, saying he eventually rubs everyone the wrong way. In the final scene, unbeknownst to Jack as he is driving alone while speaking on the CB radio, it is revealed that the Wild-Man has survived the battle and has stowed away on his truck.

== Cast ==
- Kurt Russell as Jack Burton, a cocky, wise-cracking truck driver who gets involved in an ancient battle when he makes a delivery to Chinatown, San Francisco.
- Kim Cattrall as Gracie Law, a lawyer who is Jack's love interest.
- Dennis Dun as Wang Chi, Jack's friend and a restaurant owner whose fiancée is kidnapped by Lo Pan.
- James Hong as Lo Pan, an ancient Chinese sorcerer who was cursed by Emperor Qin Shi Huang.
- Victor Wong as Egg Shen, a sorcerer and old enemy of Lo Pan who also drives a tour bus.
- Kate Burton as Margo Litzenberger, a reporter who helps the team find Miao Yin.
- Donald Li as Eddie Lee, a successful businessman and Wang's friend who helps them rescue Gracie.
- Carter Wong as Thunder, an elemental master who can expand his body.
- Peter Kwong as Rain, an elemental master and expert martial artist with a sword.
- James Pax as Lightning, an elemental master who can shoot out bolts of lightning.
- Suzee Pai as Miao Yin, Wang's fiancée, who was kidnapped by Lo Pan when she arrived in America.
- Chao-Li Chi as Uncle Chu, Wang's uncle.
- Jeff Imada as Needles, a member of a street gang called The Lords of Death.

Al Leong, Gerald Okamura and Nathan Jung appear as Wing Kong hatchet men. Lia Chang and Cary-Hiroyuki Tagawa have minor roles as Wing Kong members. Frank Ho, Conan Lee (uncredited) and James Lew (the film's martial arts choreographer) appear as Chang Sing warriors. Jerry Hardin appears in the beginning of the film as a lawyer.

== Production ==
=== Screenplay ===
Big Trouble in Little China originated from a script by first-time screenwriters Gary Goldman and David Z. Weinstein. Goldman had been inspired by a new wave of martial arts films that had "all sorts of weird actions and special effects, shot against this background of Oriental mysticism and modern sensibilities", such as The Butterfly Murders; Weinstein, for his part, was fascinated by the historical Tong Wars of 19th-century San Francisco's Chinatown. The duo combined these interests with a shared fondness for classic westerns to write the first iteration of the screenplay. Entitled Lotus, the script took place in the 1880s: friends cowboy Wiley Prescott and Chinese railroad worker Sun are set to meet Sun's fiancée Lotus as she arrives to San Francisco, but are opposed by sorcerer Lo Pan who captures Sun's fiancée and separates Prescott from his horse as the story progresses into a mystical realm. They submitted the script to TAFT Entertainment Pictures executive producers Paul Monash and Keith Barish during the summer of 1982; the script, now renamed Big Trouble in Little China, was soon optioned by 20th Century Fox.

I really did believe that it was a mistake to try to get a 'double remove' on the audience. You're asking them to go to a period western, get used to all those little eccentric realities, and then go one step further into a yet more exotic world. I thought, 'Why bother?' It's a pretty funny planet we live on, so why don't we start there and then go into this strange netherworld.

— W.D. Richter

The Weird West setting of the screenplay led to objections from producers; Monash remarked that "the problems [with the script] came largely from the fact it was set in turn-of-the-century San Francisco." Because Goldman and Weinstein were unwilling to update their story to a modern setting, and from the producer's desire to bring a new perspective to the writing, the original duo were removed from the project while screenwriter/script doctor W. D. Richter was brought in to extensively rewrite the script. Richter modernized the setting to avoid distancing audiences; though basic elements of the story were retained, such as Lo Pan, Richter rewrote the story "nearly from scratch". In particular, he approached the story as a comedy: the straightforward cowboy hero Prescott reimagined as the blowhard trucker Jack Burton. His draft was written in 10 weeks, a process that included research into Chinese mythology. While admitting that he invented or changed some lore, Richter expressed a desire for those portions of the script to be "as authentic as possible" despite coming from a white writer.

Richter's script was shopped around to directors by the studio. Fox wanted to deny Goldman and Weinstein writing credit, and eliminated their names from press releases in favor of solely crediting Richter. In March 1986, the Writers Guild of America West determined that "written by" credit would go to Goldman and Weinstein, based on the WGA screenwriting credit system which protects original writers; Richter would instead receive an "adaptation by" credit for his extensive rewrite of the script.

=== Direction ===
The project was also offered to Richter to direct, due to its perceived similarity to his previous directorial outing The Adventures of Buckaroo Banzai Across the 8th Dimension; however, Richter turned it down as he wished to direct smaller movies rather than another expansive action-adventure film. Barish and Monash first offered the project to Carpenter in July 1985, with the idea he would produce an adventure movie in the model of Indiana Jones. Having found the earlier Goldman/Weinstein script creative but unfocused – "too huge and bizarre" – Carpenter was impressed by Richter's scripting of "an action/adventure/comedy/mystery/ghost story/monster movie" and signed up. Carpenter made his own additions to Richter's rewrites, which included strengthening the Gracie Law role by linking her directly to Chinatown, removing a few action sequences due to budgetary restrictions, and adjusting material that could offend Chinese Americans. Richter, who had befriended Carpenter while the two were attending USC film school, found that Carpenter's notes built on what had already been established and made his part in the script-editing process easy. Carpenter remarked that the "offbeat" characters had a "very 1930s Howard Hawks" quality to them — with respect to their rapid-fire delivery of dialogue, especially between Jack Burton and Gracie Law.

Carpenter had discovered a fondness for Hong Kong action cinema while in film school, with the "strange, yet bloody and violent and innocent [and] 'what is this exactly?' vibe" of movies like Five Fingers of Death, Master of the Flying Guillotine, and Zu Warriors from the Magic Mountain providing inspiration. He saw Big Trouble in Little China as the opportunity to fulfill a decade-long desire to make his own kung fu movie.

In this movie, we've done a reverse. I'm the traditional leading character but I'm also the guy who slips on a banana peel. Dennis Dun, our sidekick as it were, carries the story as far as the traditional leading man stuff.

— Kurt Russell

Carpenter and Russell saw the film as an inverse of traditional scenarios in action films that featured a Caucasian protagonist helped by a minority sidekick. In Big Trouble in Little China, Jack Burton, despite his bravado, is constantly portrayed as rather bumbling; in a climactic fight sequence, he knocks himself unconscious before the battle begins. Wang Chi, on the other hand, is constantly portrayed as highly skilled and competent. On the commentary track recorded for the DVD release, Carpenter described the film as about a sidekick (Burton) who thinks he is a leading man. According to Carpenter, the studio "didn't get it" and made him write something that would explain the character of Jack Burton. Carpenter came up with a prologue scene where Egg Shen reassures the audience (vis-à-vis a lawyer character) that "Jack Burton is a man of courage."

=== Competition with The Golden Child ===
How many adventure pictures dealing with Chinese mysticism have been released by the major studios in the past 20 years? For two of them to come along at the exact same time is more than mere coincidence.

— John Carpenter

Production of Big Trouble in Little China was partially shaped by its anticipation of competition with Paramount Pictures' upcoming The Golden Child. The two movies share similar themes, both comedic action-adventures following a Californian everyman drawn into a plot centering on Chinese mysticism. Carpenter himself had been offered The Golden Child, declining due to his commitment to Big Trouble; though he initially dismissed the films as "not really similar", as production of The Golden Child progressed he came to view the two movies as "basically the same".

The box-office draw of superstar Eddie Murphy led Fox to fear their movie would lose in a direct competition. To beat the rival production to in theaters, Big Trouble went into production in October 1985 so it could open in July 1986, five months before The Golden Child's Christmas release. Carpenter was hired by 20th Century Fox because of his reputation for working fast, and the film had a limited preproduction schedule of 10 to 12 weeks.

=== Casting ===
Carpenter initially looked for a major star for the lead role to compete with The Golden Child's casting of Murphy; the director wanted Clint Eastwood or Jack Nicholson, but neither actor was available. The studio felt Kurt Russell was an up-and-coming star and, additionally, Russell had previously appeared in Carpenter's films (Elvis, Escape from New York, and The Thing) and the duo had developed a longstanding friendship. Russell was initially unsure if he could find an interesting way to play Burton but valued working with Carpenter. After discussions with the director and rereading the script, he saw the movie as an opportunity to play a type of action hero that differed from his prior roles like Snake Plissken by mixing a leading-man archetype with comic-relief behavior: "I've never played a hero who has so many faults. Jack is and isn't the hero. He falls on his ass as much as he comes through. ... He thinks he knows how to handle situations and then gets into situations he can't handle but somehow blunders his way through anyhow." Russell took inspiration from John Wayne's characters in portraying Burton, albeit heightening the bravado to a comedic level. Carpenter and Russell's familiarity allowed the actor to improvise and explore outside the script during shooting.

Kim Cattrall, cast as Gracie Law, considered Big Trouble in Little China an ideal role for that point in her career. Keen to avoid typecasting — first as a dramatic actress due to work in various TV dramas, then as a comedienne from roles in Porky's and Police Academy — Cattrall saw the role as not only synthesizing both drama and humor but also showing new facets of her acting ability. Though her character is often in peril, Cattrall did not view Law as a damsel in distress: "I'm not screaming for help the whole time. I think the humor comes out of the situations and my relationship with Jack Burton. I'm the brains and he's the brawn". Carpenter liked how Cattrall had a "comedic sense" yet could be serious, standing up for her acting abilities against studio pressure to cast a "rock star" as the love interest.

Casting the Asian characters in the movie was approached with care. Year of the Dragon, released 1985, had drawn much controversy for its depiction of Chinese-Americans. Carpenter and producers met with community leaders to assuage concerns about the writing of the movie and hired a casting director who represented many Chinese and Asian-American actors.

Dennis Dun was drawn to Big Trouble in Little China as he was a fan of Richter's eclectic science fiction film Buckaroo Banzai. Carpenter was familiar with Dun's role in Year of the Dragon and met with the actor twice before casting him in the role of Wang Chi only a few days before principal photography. He was drawn to the portrayal of Asian characters in the movie, appreciating that, like him, Wang was second-generation American and could be portrayed as Chinese yet still "a regular, American guy" rather than "foreign" or a punchline as many of Dun's previous roles had made him feel. The martial arts sequences were not difficult for Dun, who had "dabbled" in training as a kid and performed in Chinese opera as an adult.

=== Principal photography ===
Kurt Russell lifted weights and began running two months before production began to prepare for the physical demands of principal photography. In addition, Carpenter and his cast and crew did a week's rehearsals that mainly involved choreographing the martial arts scenes.

Although the early exterior establishing scenes were filmed on location in Chinatown, most of the film was shot on sets built in the Fox lot in Los Angeles. Production designer John Lloyd designed the elaborate underground sets and recreated Chinatown with three-story buildings, roads, streetlights, sewers and so on. This was necessary for the staging of complicated special effects and kung fu fight sequences that would have been very hard to do on location. This forced the filmmaker to shoot the film in 15 weeks with a $25 million budget. For the film's many fight scenes, Carpenter worked with martial arts choreographer James Lew, who planned out every move in advance. "I used every cheap gag — trampolines, wires, reverse movements and upside-down sets," Carpenter said. "It was much like photographing a dance."

=== Visual effects ===
Boss Film Studios handled the numerous effects for the film. Richard Edlund, head of Boss Film Studios, described Big Trouble as probably its favorite film at the time after Ghostbusters. The effects budget for the film was just under $2 million; though Edlund considered this barely adequate, as Big Trouble was Boss Film's first project for Fox he viewed the production as an opportunity to secure further work from the studio. Richter's script included many fantastical creatures and settings, though many were only loosely defined and left up to Boss Film to design the ultimate appearance of. Steve Johnson led work on many effects, including Lo Pan's old age makeup (a wizened appearance inspired by Dick Smith's work on Little Big Man) and transformation into his middle-aged form, the "wild man" (a shaggy-haired apelike demon), a fishlike "sewer demon" (designed by Screaming Mad George and puppeteered by Noble Craig), and the explosive death of Thunder. One of the most difficult effects was the "Guardian", a floating creature dotted with eyeballs that scouts for Lo Pan. Also designed by Screaming Mad George, this complex effect took approximately 60 artists and cost over $100,000 to create due to its many points of articulation — far more complex than the similar character Slimer the crew had created for Ghostbusters. It was powered by several puppeteers and dozens of cables to control its facial expressions. To create the appearance of the Guardian flying freely, two puppets were created — a front and rear view — and it was filmed with a proprietary matting system specially designed for it.

Though Carpenter found Edlund professional and straightforward to work with, he had concerns during production about the scale of Boss Film's operation; the director would notice instances where they called to cut down on effects due to budget or capability, only for such concerns to recede when the company secured additional work (a pattern of behavior he had noticed with many effects shops). Edlund was surprised by these remarks, reflecting that despite limited preparation time the studio had no major difficulties on Big Trouble.

== Music ==
With the soundtrack, Carpenter wanted to avoid a stereotypically "Chinese" sound, as he found that "other scores for American movies about Chinese characters are basically rinky tink, chop suey music. I didn't want that for Big Trouble". Carpenter instead focused on a general fantasy-music feeling with his trademark synthesizer scoring, bringing in a rock 'n' roll feel. As with several of his other film scores, Carpenter collaborated with Alan Howarth. The title theme, "Pork Chop Express", was partially inspired by the temp score's use of "Just Got Paid" by ZZ Top for the opening scene.

The theme song "Big Trouble in Little China", which plays over the closing credits, was performed by The Coup De Villes — a group consisting of Carpenter alongside friends Tommy Lee Wallace (second-unit director on the film) and Nick Castle. Though all three members appear in the music video, the song was primarily performed by Carpenter excepting backing vocals by Castle.

Carpenter's score was nominated at the 14th Saturn Awards for "Best Music".

== Reception ==
=== Box office ===
Opening in 1,053 theaters on July 2, 1986, Big Trouble in Little China grossed $2.7 million in its opening weekend and went on to gross $11.1 million in North America, well below its estimated budget of $19–25 million, making it a box-office bomb. The film was released in the midst of the hype for James Cameron's blockbuster Aliens, which was released 16 days after. On the DVD commentary for Big Trouble in Little China, Carpenter and Russell discuss this among possible reasons for the film's disappointing box office gross. At a public appearance, Russell stated that the studio decided to 'bury' the movie and did not promote it.

=== Critical response ===
On review aggregator Rotten Tomatoes, the film has an approval rating of 64% based on 156 reviews. The site's consensus reads: "A joyously overstuffed blend of comedy, martial arts, and supernatural mayhem, Big Trouble in Little China makes little effort to be coherent but races along thanks to Kurt Russell's rowdy swagger and John Carpenter's kinetic direction." On Metacritic it has a score of 53% based on reviews from 15 critics, indicating "mixed or average" reviews. Audiences surveyed by CinemaScore gave the film a grade "B+" on scale of A to F.

Ron Base, in his review for the Toronto Star, praised Russell's performance. "He does a great John Wayne imitation. But he's not just mimicking these heroes, he is using them to give his own character a broad, satiric edge." Walter Goodman in The New York Times wrote, "In kidding the flavorsome proceedings even as he gets the juice out of them, the director, John Carpenter, is conspicuously with it." Writer Harlan Ellison, widely known in Hollywood for his brutally honest critiques, praised the film, writing that it had "some of the funniest lines spoken by any actor this year to produce a cheerfully blathering live-action cartoon that will give you release from the real pressures of your basically dreary lives." In his review for Time, Richard Corliss wrote, "Little China offers dollops of entertainment, but it is so stocked with canny references to other pictures that it suggests a master's thesis that moves."

A more muted review came from Roger Ebert of Chicago Sun-Times, who gave the film a mixed 2 stars out of a possible 4. He declared the opening half-hour was lively and "visually spectacular", before the film gradually began to repeat itself. He wrote: "special effects don't mean much unless we care about the characters who are surrounded by them, and in this movie the characters often seem to exist only to fill up the foregrounds," and felt that it was "straight out of the era of Charlie Chan and Fu Manchu, with no apologies and all of the usual stereotypes." Paul Attanasio, in The Washington Post, criticized the screenwriters for being "much better at introducing a character than they are at developing one". David Ansen wrote, in his review for Newsweek, "though it is action packed, spectacularly edited and often quite funny, one can't help feeling that Carpenter is squeezing the last drops out of a fatigued genre." In his review for The Times, David Robinson felt that Carpenter was "overwhelmed by his own special effects, without a strong enough script to guide him."

Alex Stewart reviewed Big Trouble in Little China for White Dwarf No. 83, and stated that the film was "Amiable nonsense, delivered with panache by fearsome demons and flying swordsmen; and the jokes work. [Low budget action film director] Wayne Crawford should take notes."

== Home media ==
Big Trouble in Little China was released on VHS in the United States by CBS/Fox Video in 1987. The film ranked fifth on Billboard's videocassette rental chart in February 1987 and placed 40th on its year-end ranking of the 50 most rented videocassettes of 1987. A two-disc special edition DVD set on May 22, 2001. Entertainment Weekly gave the DVD a "B+" rating and wrote, "The highlight of this two disc set – which also features deleted scenes, an extended ending, trailers, and a 1986 featurette – is the pitch perfect Russell and Carpenter commentary, which delves into Fox's marketing mishaps, Chinese history, and how Russell's son did in his hockey game." In his review for the Onion A.V. Club, Noel Murray wrote, "If nothing else, this is a DVD designed for Big Trouble cultists; it's packed with articles from Cinefex and American Cinematographer that only a genre geek would appreciate."

In 2013, Arrow Video released the film on Blu-ray in the United Kingdom, including a limited-edition SteelBook. The edition featured newly recorded interviews with John Carpenter, Kurt Russell, cinematographer Dean Cundey, producer Larry Franco and stuntman Jeff Imada, alongside a 40-page booklet containing essays and archival production material.

In 2018, L'Atelier d'Images released the film on Blu-ray in France on 16 October, featuring a brand new 2K restoration. That same year, Midnight Factory released a two-disc Blu-ray collector's edition in Italy on 13 December under the title Grosso guaio a Chinatown. The edition restored much of the original Italian dubbing that had been missing from an earlier Italian Blu-ray release. It also included 162 minutes of extra content on a second disc, alongside a collector's booklet and three postcards.

On 3 December 2019, Scream Factory released a two-disc Collector's Edition Blu-ray in the United States. The edition included newly recorded audio commentaries by producer Larry Franco and special-effects artist Steve Johnson, as well as interviews with cast and crew members including Dennis Dun, James Hong, Carter Wong, Peter Kwong, screenwriters Gary Goldman and W. D. Richter, and poster artist Drew Struzan.

== Other media ==
=== Sequel ===
In June 2015, TheWrap reported that Dwayne Johnson was developing a remake to be produced under his Seven Bucks Productions film studio. Ashley Miller and Zack Stentz were hired as screenwriters, with Johnson planned to star as Burton. Though Johnson expressed interest in having the original director involved in the film, Carpenter remained "ambivalent" about a remake and did not meet with Johnson. By 2018, Seven Bucks was instead developing the film to be a sequel rather than a remake. In a 2019 interview, screenwriter Stentz explained that his script had been for a remake and he had not been contacted about the film's revised concept; he was unaware of any new scripts being commissioned and also suspected that the then-recent acquisition of 21st Century Fox by Disney had placed the project into limbo.

=== Video game ===
A tie-in video game of the same name was published in 1986 by Electric Dreams Software for the ZX Spectrum, Commodore 64 and Amstrad CPC. Critical reception was mixed.

=== Comic book series ===
On February 27, 2014, Boom! Studios announced they were working on a comic book series. The comic book is written by Eric Powell and John Carpenter with artwork by Brian Churilla. The series began in June 2014.

Boom! released a crossover limited series between Jack Burton and Snake Plissken titled Big Trouble in Little China/Escape from New York in October 2016.

A previously projected comic book series previewed by Top Cow Productions at the 2009 San Diego Comic-Con failed to appear.

On June 14, 2017, Boom! announced a new four-issue limited series, to be published in September 2017, called Big Trouble in Little China: Old Man Jack, written by Carpenter and Anthony Burch, with art by Jorge Corona. Taking place in 2020, Jack Burton comes out of retirement to battle Ching Dai and save the world.

=== Vinyl figures ===
In February 2015, Funko released a line of ReAction and Pop! vinyl figures based on Big Trouble in Little China.

=== Board game ===
On July 15, 2016, Boom! Studios announced a partnership with Everything Epic and Flipside to create a board game based on the film. It was released in 2018, and is a highly thematic cooperative miniatures board game for 1–4 players.

=== Card game ===
In August 2016, Upper Deck released the Legendary: Big Trouble in Little China deck-building card game. It is a semi-cooperative game for 2–5 players using the deck-building mechanic in which players purchase cards from a central pool to work together against the "villain" deck. The cards feature original artwork based on characters from the movie. It comes with 400 cards and a special playmat, and retails for around $40.

== Legacy and influence ==
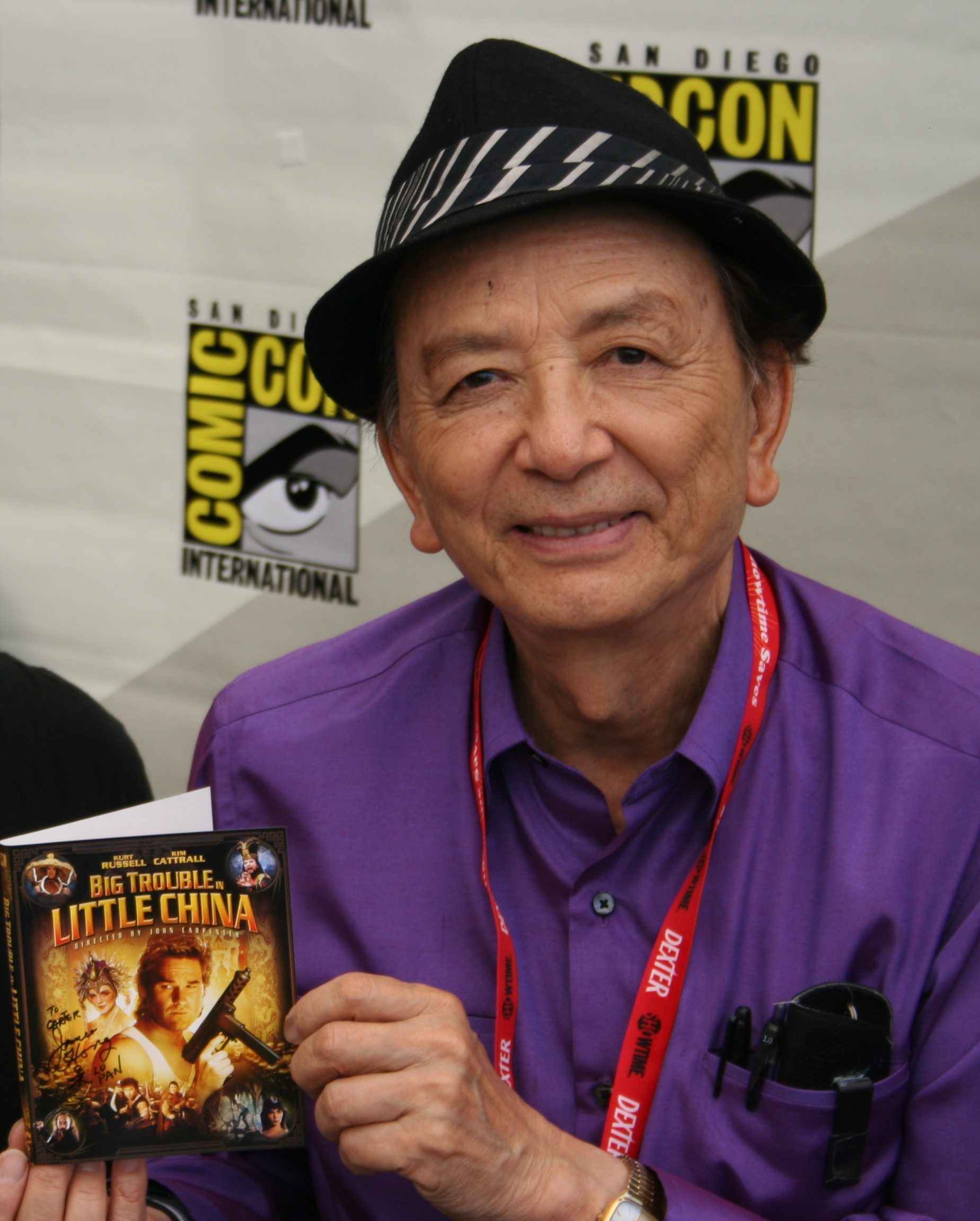
James Hong in 2011

After the commercial and initial critical failure of the film, Carpenter became very disillusioned with Hollywood and became an independent filmmaker. He said in an interview, "The experience [of Big Trouble] was the reason I stopped making movies for the Hollywood studios. I won't work for them again. I think Big Trouble is a wonderful film, and I'm very proud of it. But the reception it received, and the reasons for that reception, were too much for me to deal with. I'm too old for that sort of bullshit."

It has since enjoyed a resurgence on television and home video, and has received a good deal of retroactive positive press. Some critics and fans considered it one of Carpenter's best movies. Empire magazine voted Big Trouble in Little China the 430th greatest film in their "500 Greatest Movies of All Time" list.

The twenty-third episode of the second season of the 2012 Teenage Mutant Ninja Turtles TV series, "A Chinatown Ghost Story," uses concepts from the film, but renames the antagonist Lo Pan to Ho Chan and replaces the Storm figure Rain with Wind. In addition, James Hong (Lo Pan) reprises his Little China performance as the principal villain character.

A 2012 parody music video of the song "Gangnam Style" was entitled Lo Pan Style and featured the storyline and characters from the movie, including a cameo by James Hong.

New Zealand director Taika Waititi cited the film as an influence on Thor: Ragnarok (2017).

In the Randy Cunningham: 9th Grade Ninja season 2 episode "Big Trouble in Little Norrisville," the titular place is a reference to Little Chinatown (the title of the episode also references the film). James Hong (who played Lo Pan) also provides a guest voice role as the Shopkeeper.

The American hard rock band Lo-Pan is named after Hong's character in the movie.

The film also influenced the Mortal Kombat video game series. Series co-creator John Tobias stated that the sorcerer archetype represented by Lo Pan had a "superficial influence" on the creation of Shang Tsung, while the Strong National Museum of Play has identified Big Trouble in Little China among the action films that influenced the original game's mixture of martial arts and supernatural fantasy.

Director Edgar Wright cited Big Trouble in Little China among the films he kept in mind while making Scott Pilgrim vs. the World (2010). Wright said that he approached Scott Pilgrim by recalling the reaction he had as a child to films including Big Trouble, Gremlins and Ghostbusters, seeking to give younger viewers a similarly unexpected and overwhelming experience.

== See also ==
- List of cult films
- List of martial arts films
