= Gideon Smith & the Dixie Damned =

American rock band

Gideon Smith & The Dixie Damned
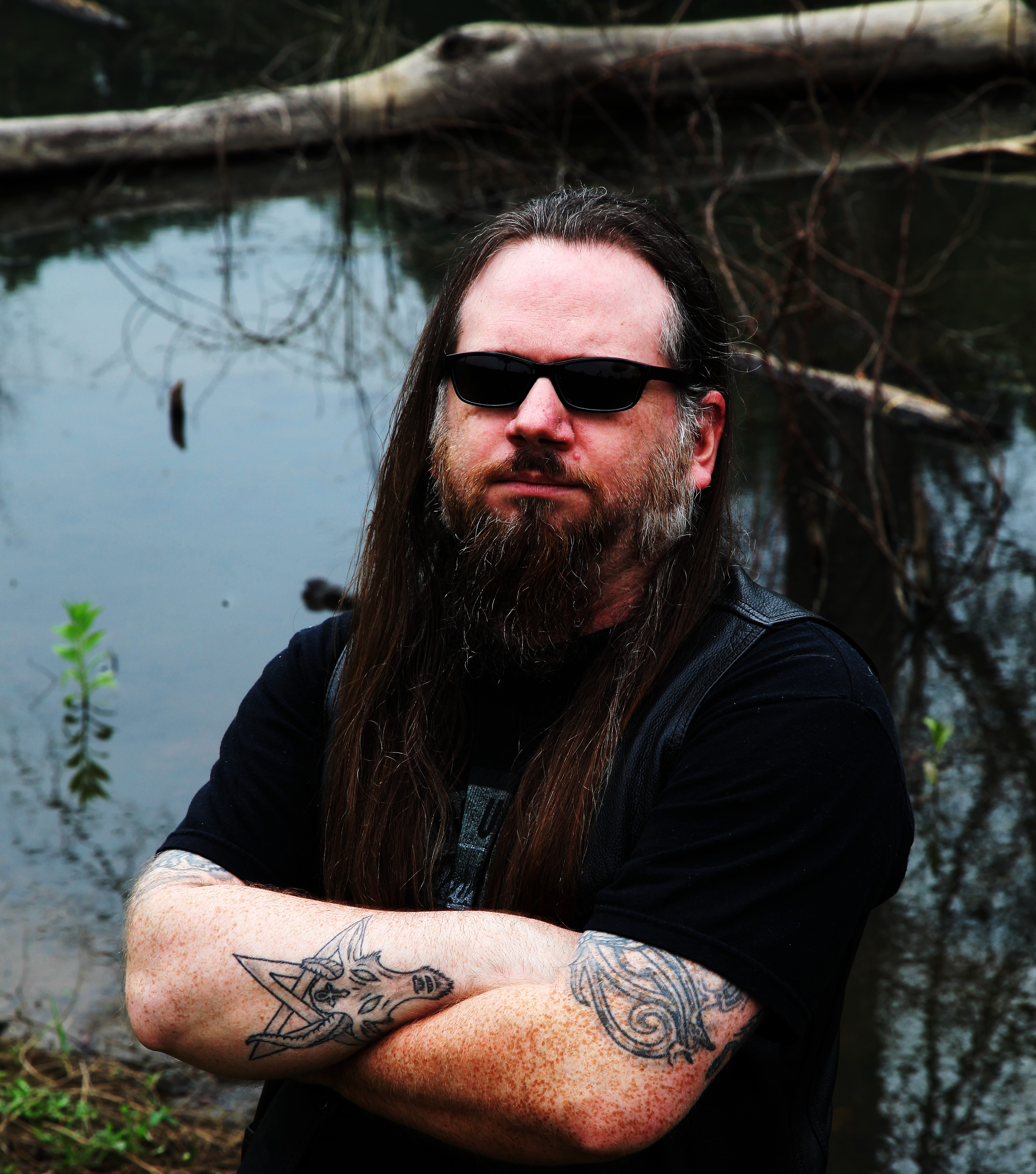

Background information
- Origin: North Carolina, United States
- Genres: Southern rock Hard rock Stoner rock
- Years active: 1996-present
- Labels: Game Two Records, Scary Records, Small Stone Records
- Members: Gideon Smith.
- Past members: Boo Duckworth
- Website: Official website

Gideon Smith and the Dixie Damned is a band based in North Carolina. Gideon Smith began singing with local bands in the Carolina music scene in 1989. In 1997, he formed "Gideon Smith & The Dixie Damned" with friends Otis Hughes and Boo Duckworth; who were formerly of the PolyGram Records act, Animal Bag. In 1998 they recorded a self-titled EP which was picked up for distribution by 'Game Two Records'. Small Stone Records signed Smith in 1999 after hearing the disc. In 2000, Smith recorded demos at Sun Studio in Memphis, Tennessee .

== Southern Gentlemen ==
After some line up changes, Smith recorded the debut album Southern Gentlemen at the Sound Farm in Indian Trail, North Carolina. The album was mixed by Al Sutton (who also worked with notable artists: Kid Rock, Sheryl Crow, Snoop Dogg, and Lynyrd Skynyrd) at the Rustbelt Studios in Detroit.

After the initial album release party was held at The Continental Club in New York City, the band went on to perform up and down the east coast. Touring partners included Raging Slab and many others.

Drummer Boo Duckworth died from natural causes in his sleep on June 5, 2002. Smith took time off to deal with the death of his friend and bandmate, and later continued to perform and record with revolving line ups.

The band's song "Draggin’ The River" was featured on an episode of the television series The Sopranos in the episode "Irregular Around The Margins" in season five, 2004.

"Draggin' The River' was also featured in the Thrillbillies Doublewide DVD starring Travis Pastrana, Andy Bell, Johnny Knoxville and Ronnie Renner in 2008.

In 2010, Classic Rock magazine featured the song "Whiskey Devil" on the CD included in its 150th issue "150 Greatest Debut Albums Of All Time".

Gideon Smith won awards from Creative Loafing for Best Hard Rock artist in 2003 and 2004.

Smith performed at the "Relay For Life" benefit in Centennial Park in Nashville, Tennessee with guitarist Jason Griscom, and recorded songs at Burns Station Sound on the Muscle Shoals mixing board.

== South Side of the Moon ==
In 2008 he returned to recording. Small Stone Records released the second full-length album, South Side Of The Moon, which was recorded at Rustbelt Studios in Detroit, Michigan with producer Eric Hoegemyer and Phil Durr. Al Sutton returned to mix the album. Guests include former Big Chief guitarist Phil Durr, Scott Hamilton and Antiseen's Jeff Clayton. The album expanded Gideon Smith's style into a psychedelic and gothic rock vein. It was successful and songs were featured on Nitro Circus and Sons of Anarchy television programs. Despite the long wait between releases, the album brought Smith acclaim and a wider audience.

The song "Black Cat Road" appeared on the MTV television series Nitro Circus on the episode "Nitro In The Guinness Book" Season one, episode 7 and also Sons of Anarchy in Season 2 in the episode 'Fix" in 2009. The song "Indian Larry" was featured on the MTV series Dudesons in America in episode "Action Heroes" ep. 109." "Way Of The Outlaw" was featured on the A&E series Dog The Bounty Hunter on the episode "Prodigal Son" in 2010 and displayed the album cover in the closing credits.

== 30 Weight ==
The third full-length album, 30 Weight, was once again recorded at Rustbelt Studio in Royal Oak, Michigan and produced and mixed by Eric Hoegemyer (drummer for Luder, Kid Rock, Uncle Kracker and others) who also guests on drums and other instruments. Phil Durr returned as lead guitarist. Sue Lott of Luder made a guest appearance on backing vocals. The title is a reference to motor oil, and also taken from a line in the song "Indian Larry" from the South Side of the Moon album that says 'blood pumping thirty weight'. The cover art was done by Alexander von Wieding. The album has gathered positive reviews and many proclaimed it to be among the best releases of the year. 30 Weight was featured by Terrorizer magazine as 'Kat's Featured Band of the Day'.

New merchandise at this time featured artwork by Mark Riddick and Jeff Gaither among others. Seventh Circle Artworks in London released a custom silver Gideon Smith iron cross ring alongside their merchandise for Saint Vitus, Candlemass, Crowbar and others.

== Musical style ==
Gideon Smith's music has been compared to that of The Cult, The Allman Brothers, Black Sabbath, The Doors and other classic rock acts. Blending the influences of Southern rock, blues, psychedelia, country and heavy metal, his music has been described as being traditional, yet unique. He is credited as one of the architects of the modern Southern stoner rock hybrid-style. His baritone vocal style has elicited comparisons to Jim Morrison, Ian Astbury, Elvis Presley, Nick Cave and Andrew Eldritch.

== Books ==
Smith is the author of the book Way Of The Outlaw Spirit, which was published in 2007 through the Lulu Enterprises publishing company. The book is a collection of philosophy and positive thinking. The book is now out of print.

== Personal life ==
Smith is known for his love of the martial arts, cars, motorcycles, ancient history and occultism. He is an outspoken proponent of world-wide religious freedom.

== Discography ==
- "Gideon Smith & the Dixie Damned EP" - Game Two Records
- Southern Gentlemen - Small Stone Records
- "Dealin’ Decks" EP - Scary Records
- South Side Of The Moon - Small Stone Records
- Right In The Nuts: A Tribute to Aerosmith - Small Stone Records (song: "Chip Away The Stone")
- Everybody loves Antiseen (tribute album) - TKO Records
- Snake Oil Supercharm: A Tribute to Zodiac Mindwarp - Sleazegrinder Records
- Sucking the 70’s - Small Stone Records (song: "The Pusher")
- Sucking the 70’s II - Back In The Saddle Again - Small Stone Records (song: "Season of The Witch")
- 30 Weight - Small Stone Records

== Other media ==
F.T.W. A Tribute To Gideon Smith; a Gideon Smith tribute album was released in 2010 by Scorpius Triangle Records. The disc is a seventeen track collection of artists from the United States, Canada and Europe performing covers of Smith's music. The album featured liner notes by several contributors and artwork by Khaos Art.
