= Morsel (band) =

American indie rock band

- Origin: Ann Arbor, Michigan, USA
- Years active: 1991–2001
- Labels: Small Stone
- Members: Miriam Cabrera; Be Hussey; John Vorus; Jason Burbo; Joshua Pardon
- Website: Official website

Morsel is an indie rock ensemble that was founded in Ann Arbor, Michigan and features Miriam Cabrera (vocals, flute), Be Hussey (bass guitar, vocals), John "Fathead" Vorus (didgeridoo, electronics), Jason Burbo (guitar), and Joshua Pardon (bass guitar).

== Early history ==
In an interview with Craig Regala and Tony Barnett of Moo Magazine, Hussey stated, “Morsel began in October 1991 in Ann Arbor, Michigan. We recorded our first real demo released on cassette format in March 1992 (the G.I.B.L.E.T. ep) . . . We began with the intention of doing something different. There is no use in rehashing the past for the band as well as the listener. Inherent in this is an honest approach, and that comes through in our live show, which, by the way, is much better than our CDs.” In that same interview, Cabrera elaborated, “We wanted to do something original and interesting, but we never sat down and said ‘Okay, this is what we want to sound like.’ It wasn't contrived. We definitely did a lot of jamming to see what would come out. The music we play is result of working on refining and melding what we're each inclined to do as individual musicians. The ‘sound’ came first, then we realized what it was, and now we work on developing it.”

The band's sound and presentation tended to lump them into an avant garde category shared by other "noise-oriented" bands who may or may not have shared Morsel's instrumental abilities. Hussey revealed in the Moo interview that “Miriam runs her flute through a ‘Leslie’ cabinet (rotating horn), and she sings through her flute microphone. Many people freak on that. People focus on it a bit too much to the point of it possibly becoming a gimmick. People who write about bands need to focus on something, and that is usually the thing. We certainly don't use it as a gimmick; we simply increase the potential of creating new and interesting sounds by introducing new elements.” It had also been noted that Cabrera was known to "use a buzz-saw for additional noise texture (Cicero's, November '95)." Alan Goldsmith described Morsel's 1992 G.I.B.L.E.T. EP as “anthem rock on an almost operatic scale, with a demonic choir, shifts in intensity, blasting wall-of-sound guitars, and a complexity rarely seen on a local level (Ann Arbor Current-Entertainment Monthly, February 1993).” The Ann Arbor News also focused on the band's eccentricities stating, “Cabrera sings into the blow hole of her flute. The amplified result is a strange, angry shriek that sounds powerful and doomed at the same time (The Ann Arbor News New Releases 24 April 1993).”

== Choke Records ==
Morsel "signed to Choke, Inc. Records of Chicago in the summer of 1993" . . . booking "time in February 1994 with Steve Albini to record Noise Floor, released in April '94.” Dave Segal wrote, “Morsel deal in hyper kinetic post-punk-prog-rock, with fractured funk moves thrown into the pot as an almost ironic gesture. The ten songs on Noise Floor are marked by frayed guitar textures, frequent fluid time changes, and a female voice filtered through the blow hole of a flute, for a warped alien effect that Chrome exploited so well. Sometimes Morsel seem to be playing it straight, even approaching a conventional low-key, indie-rock beauty. But then they'll abruptly scrunch up the rhythm, play crazy staccato riffs, pause unexpectedly, sing like Satan's sister . . . those kinds of things (Alternative Press August 1994).” Johnny Pecorelli said “Morsel's Steve Albini-produced debut, Noise Floor, should raise a few eyebrows itself. Sometimes melodic, sometimes atonal, sometimes full-on noise, the band makes use of everything from buzzsaws to flutes, trumpets and lilting guitar riffs. Singer Miriam Cabrera wails through primitive rotophasers; bassist Be Hussey tunes down to low D (for added evil); while Hedge spins out effects-drenched arpeggios from Mars. All this and a sense of dynamics solidified by drummer Brian Boulter which is downright schizophrenic (Alternative Press).” In his “Local Music: The Best of ‘94,” Agenda contributor Alan Goldsmith wrote, “Raw but melodic, symphonic yet garage band. Morsel and the music they've produced is awash in contradictions, like all great art. This release, produced by producer-GOD Steve Albini (whose credits include Nirvana), is spaced-out mind music that is best heard with open ears. It's rock and roll taken to an intense other level. Computer-processed roaming vocals, guitars that sound like acid flashbacks, but with a (for lack of a better word) symphony-like musical structure, Morsel is like a grunge, non-smartass Frank Zappa with their smaller sense of music theory complexity. While all this sounds academic on paper - it isn't. It's poetic and wonderful rock and roll that takes risks (Agenda, 1995).” After its release, the band toured extensively across the United States. In 1995, they recorded a follow-up EP at Ann Arbor's 40 Oz Sound with new guitarist Geoff Streadwick engineering. On the eve of the release, the label folded.

== Small Stone Records ==
In late 1995, Morsel signed on with Detroit's Small Stone Records.

Hussey explained Morsel's transition from Choke, Inc. to Small Stone Records in the moo interview: “This EP was to be released in the Fall of '95 . . . Choke collapsed . . . The EP was released instead on Detroit's Small Stone label in April '96. Meanwhile, a new guitarist and drummer were added and touring commenced during the fall of '95 . . .” Scott Hamilton said, “I did this compilation called Detroit Rust City. Half of the bands I picked were bands I really loved, like Morsel and Perplexa, from that Ann Arbor hipster scene (The Record, March 2007 Vol. I, Issue III).” Todd Spencer wrote in his “Amplified Notions” column, “Morsel has released a song called ‘Glangkoon’ on a split 7-inch single on Dayton, Ohio's Simple Solution Records. ‘Glangkoon’ is their first recorded effort with Geoff Streadwick, a local guitarist they acquired last summer. It does sound different than ‘Noise Floor,’ their Choke Records full-length of a year ago, when they had current Wig frontman (Clark S. Nova being his latest pseudonym) playing guitar. The new single was recorded at Geoff's Ann Arbor studio, 40 oz. Sound (Ann Arbor Current-Entertainment Monthly, July 1995).” Since then, the band has released three full length records, a remix record, an EP, and a handful of singles. From the period of 1995-2001, they toured extensively across the United States. In 2001, the band released its final full-length cd "para siempre," recorded at comp-ny Ann Arbor by Morsel founder Be Hussey, and new bassist Joshua Pardon, with John Vorus contributing many of the ambient tracks.

== Members ==
- Miriam Cabrera (vocals, flute)
- Be Hussey (bass guitar, vocals, drums)
- John Vorus (didjeridoo, electronics, backing vocals)
- Jason Burbo (guitar, backing vocals)
- Joshua Pardon (bass guitar)

== Past members ==
- Shawn Jimmerson (guitar, backing vocals)
- Geoff Streadwick (guitar)
- Rob Rasmussen (guitar)
- Jacques Duskin (drums)
- Craig McNary (drums)
- Brian Boulter (drums)
- Chad Pratt (drums)

== Discography ==
=== Albums ===
- Noise Floor – (February, 1994. Choke, Inc.)
- Morsel EP – (April, 1995. Small Stone)
- I'm A Wreck – (April, 1997. Small Stone)
- Wrecked & Remixed – (April, 1999. Small Stone)
- Para Siempre – (October, 2001. Small Stone)

=== Singles ===
- Glangkoon – (1994)
- Static – (1996)

== Sources ==
- Morsel at AllMusic
- Small Stone's Morsel page
- Regala, Craig and Tony Barnett. moo magazine issue 25 (September 1996): pp _.
- Goldsmith, Alan. Ann Arbor Current-Entertainment Monthly, February 1993
- The Ann Arbor News New Releases 24 April 1993
- Nichols, Michelle and Rick Green. Jam Rag 28 April 1993.
- Hamilton, Jill. The Ann Arbor News 31 December 1993.
- Alternative Press August 1994.
- Local Music: The Best of ‘94 Agenda, 1995.
- The Record, March 2007 Vol. I, Issue III.
- Spencer, Todd. Ann Arbor Current-Entertainment Monthly, July 1995.
