= Roadsaw =

American rock band

- Origin: Boston, Massachusetts, U.S.
- Genres: Hard rock; Stoner rock; Heavy metal; Alternative metal
- Years active: 1994–present
- Labels: Ripple Music; Small Stone; Lunasound; Tortuga; MIA; Wonderdrug; Curve of the Earth; Mad Oak
- Members: Craig Riggs; Ian Ross; Tim Catz
- Website: www.roadsaw.net

Roadsaw is an American rock band from Boston, Massachusetts, formed in 1994. To date, the band has released six studio albums.

== History ==
=== Early years (1994–1997) ===
In the year 2000, the band gave the following explanation for their name:

"We were really, really stoned, we saw something we didn’t know what it was. We called it a Roadsaw. We joked about that being the name of our band, and then it stuck ... It’s like a big piece of heavy machinery tearing up the road."

Roadsaw released their first 7-inch single, "Fancy Pants", with the B-side "Handed You Your Ass", on Curve of the Earth Records in 1994. The following year, they recorded their first album, One Million Dollars (sometimes styled as $1,000,000), with the same label. The album featured the same two tracks from the previous single.

Two years later, the band released their second full album, Nationwide, originally with Curve of the Earth, and the re-released with M.I.A. Records.

=== Lunasound and Wonderdrug Records (2000–2006) ===
Roadsaw released their next album, Rawk n' Roll, in 2000, as an LP release via Tortuga Recordings and a self-released CD. This album was subsequently re-released by Sweden's Lunasound Recording in 2002.

In 2001, the band recorded a compilation album, Takin' Out the Trash, on the label Wonderdrug Records. The album contained live recordings, demos, outtakes, and a cover of the Van Halen song "Outta Love Again".

In 2002, they contributed to Sucking the 70s, a stoner metal various artist tribute to artists from the 1970s. They recorded a stoner version of the song "Vehicle" from the American band The Ides of March. In 2006, they then contributed a performance of the Led Zeppelin song "When the Levee Breaks" to the sequel, Sucking the 70's – Back in the Saddle Again.

=== Small Stone Records (2007–2011) ===
Rawk n' Roll was re-released again in 2007 by Small Stone Records.

Roadsaw then recorded two further albums with Small Stone Records: See You in Hell! (2008) and Roadsaw (2011).

=== Ripple Music (2016–present) ===
In 2016, Roadsaw signed to the label Ripple Music. Their first album with the label, Tinnitus the Night, was released in June 2019. This was followed by another compilation album, More Trash, (self-released on the band's Bandcamp page) in 2020.

== Musical style and influences ==
Roadsaw cite artists such as Cactuss, Iron Butterfly, Black Sabbath, Captain Beyond, and Josh Homme (Kyuss, Queens of the Stone Age) as influences on their work; however, they also note that they are influenced further by "heavy blues and psychedelic rock."

== Band members ==
=== Current members ===
- Craig Riggs – vocals
- Ian Ross – guitar, drums
- Tim Catz – bass, drums

=== Past members ===
- Jeremy – drums
- Dave Unger – keyboards
- Darryl Shepard - guitar, vocals

== Discography ==
=== Studio albums ===
- One Million Dollars (1995)
- Nationwide (1997)
- Rawk n' Roll (2007)
- See You in Hell! (2008)
- Roadsaw (2011)
- Tinnitus the Night (2019)

=== Extended plays ===
- Roadsaw EP (2012)

=== Singles ===
- "Man's Ruin" (1996)
- "Fancy Pants" (2005)
- "American Dream" (2007)

=== Compilation albums ===
- Takin' Out the Trash (2000)
- More Trash (2020)

=== Compilation contributions ===
- The Boston Sherwood Tapes (2001) Split with Blackrock
- Sucking the 70s (2002) Various Artists
- Sucking the 70's – Back in the Saddle Again (2006) Various Artists
