= Lo-Pan (band) =

US musical group

- Origin: Columbus, Ohio
- Genres: Hard rock, Stoner rock
- Years active: 2005–present
- Label: Small Stone Recordings Aqualamb Records
- Members: Jeff Martin; Skot Thompson; Jesse Bartz; Chris Thompson
- Past members: Brian Fristoe; Adrian Zambrano

Lo-Pan is an American hard rock band from Columbus, Ohio. The band has been praised for its "ability to write a driving, catchy rock song in a well-established aesthetic while still sounding original, vibrant and exciting," and for "performing heavy rock that's at once infectious and distinctly ambitious." Their most recent album, Get Well Soon, was released in April 2025.

== History ==
The band formed in 2005 with bassist Skot Thompson, drummer Jesse Bartz, and guitarist Brian Fristoe. Singer Jeff Martin joined the following year. The band shares its name with a villain in the comedy-martial arts film Big Trouble in Little China. Lo-Pan started with a stoner rock sound but have since added elements of traditional hard rock and heavy metal. They released a self-titled album in 2006, then signed with Small Stone Recordings, which released the album Sasquanaut in 2009. Small Stone released their third album, Salvador, in 2011. That album was praised by AllMusic for achieving "a fluid balance of guitar-driven muscle and songwriting immediacy," with a nod to "remarkable singer" Jeff Martin.

Lo-Pan's 2014 album Colossus received widespread praise from the hard rock and heavy metal communities. For example, MetalSucks called the album "heavy, hooky" and "a juggernaut that will bring joy to your bros." Reviewer Birdie Garcia described the album as "a unique high steppin’ tune in its unusual doom presence, something that has a groove but can also be blasted on the road while going a million miles to nowhere," while SputnikMusic praised the album for "bludgeoning the listener with a cavalcade of gargantuan riffs from the ground up." Brian Fristoe left the band shortly after the release of Colossus and was replaced by Brujas del Sol guitarist Adrian Zambrano. Lo-Pan released the five-song EP In Tensions in early 2017; The Obelisk named the EP as its best short release of the year. Shortly after the EP was recorded, Zambrano departed due to the rigors of the band's touring schedule, and was replaced by Sleepers Awake guitarist Chris Thompson (no relation to bassist Skot Thompson).

The band's fifth album, Subtle, was released in May 2019. The album earned positive reviews from Kerrang!, which praised its "intense, swirling tunes that float with both an otherworldly grace and a devastating menace," Decibel, which called the album "a gem," and Consequence of Sound, which noted "Jeff Martin’s soaring vocals over sludgy riffs, providing a nice dichotomy of melodic and heavy." In 2022, drummer Jesse Bartz was diagnosed with cancer of the tonsils, and received surgery and treatment funded by a crowdsourcing campaign. The band's sixth album, Get Well Soon, was released on April 4, 2025. Reviewers praised the album for its songcraft and honest lyrics about the current political environment; with Everything Is Noise calling the album "defiant with positivity."

== Members ==
Current members

- Skot Thompson – bass (2005–present)
- Jesse Bartz – drums (2005–present)
- Jeff Martin – vocals (2006–present)
- Chris Thompson – guitar (2016–present)

Former members

- Brian Fristoe – guitar (2005–2014)
- Adrian Zambrano – guitar (2014–2016)

== Discography ==
=== Albums ===
- Lo-Pan (2006)
- Sasquanaut (2009, re-released 2011)
- Salvador (2011)
- Colossus (2014)
- In Tensions (EP, 2017)
- Subtle (2019)
- Get Well Soon (2025)
