= Mad Oak Studios =

American recording studio

Coordinates: 42°21′21″N 71°8′10″W

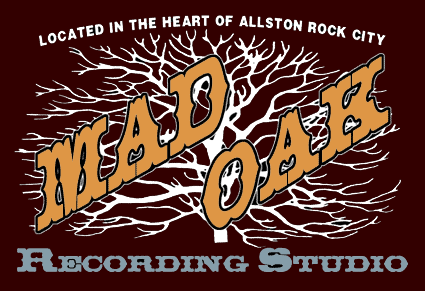
- Industry: Music
- Founded: 2000 as Mad Oak Recording Studio
- Headquarters: Allston, Massachusetts, U.S.
- Area served: U.S.
- Key people: Craig Riggs, studio owner Benny Grotto, head engineer, studio owner
- Products: Recording Studios

Mad Oak Studios is a recording studio located in Allston, Massachusetts neighborhood of Boston, United States. It was established in the year 2000 by Craig Riggs and Frank Pagliughi, who were later joined by PK Pandey and long-time head engineer Benny Grotto as co-owners.

== History ==
Mad Oak Studios’ original location was formerly home to a wood-working shop called Mad Oak Wood Working. Craig Riggs, then-frontman of the rock band Roadsaw, realized that much of his band's revenue was being spent on studio time, and became determined to open a recording studio catering to musicians with limited income who did not want to be forced to compromise the recording quality of their music for financial reasons.

He partnered with Frank Pagliughi, and together they took over the wood shop’s space. After adopting the woodshop's name, Mad Oak Studios was born in the year 2000.

In 2013, due to the booming residential market in Allston, Massachusetts, the studio was forced to change locations. That same year, the studio parted ways with co-owner Frank Pagliughi, and Benny Grotto was made co-owner. Construction on a new studio began in early 2015, and was completed later that year.

=== Personnel ===
Benny Grotto (2010 Boston Music Awards' Producer Of The Year) - head engineer

== Facilities ==
Mad Oak has a Walters-Storyk Design Group-designed control room, a variety of live room acoustic options, and multiple isolation booths.

== Artists who have recorded at Mad Oak Studios ==
- Acaro
- Aerosmith
- Aloud
- Another Animal
- The Antlers
- Blood for Blood
- Big D and the Kids Table
- Kim Boekbinder
- The Connection
- Cortez
- Will Dailey
- Howie Day
- deadlikedeath
- Death Ray Vision
- Dixie Witch
- Tanya Donelly
- The Dresden Dolls
- The Ducky Boys
- Face of the Sun
- Ben Folds
- Marti Frederiksen
- Tony Furtado
- Neil Gaiman
- Gang Green
- Gozu
- Juliana Hatfield
- Levon Helm
- InAeona
- Joey Kramer
- Damian Kulash
- The Lights Out
- Lo-Pan
- Bryan McPherson
- Mellow Bravo
- James Montgomery
- Motherboar
- Arthur Nasson
- New Collisions
- Oddzar
- Only Living Witness
- Orange Goblin
- Amanda Palmer
- PanzerBastard
- Ramallah
- Razors in the Night
- Rebirth Brass Band
- Eli "Paperboy" Reed
- Roadsaw
- Ruby Rose Fox
- Sasquatch
- Scissorfight
- Second Grave
- Andrew Shea
- Jules Shear
- Sinners & Saints
- Slapshot
- Slothrust
- Solace
- Stars & Stripes
- Suplecs
- Steven Tyler
- Upper Crust, The
- Victory at Sea
- Brian Viglione
- Waltham
- The Wandas
- The Welch Boys
- The World Inferno Friendship Society
- "Weird Al" Yankovic
- Thalia Zedek

=== Live at Mad Oak ===
Live at Mad Oak was a monthly concert series, featuring local talent performing in front of an invite-only audience. They were multi-tracked and captured by a professional filming crew. The shows were mixed live-to-stereo and made available online the next morning. This was supported entirely by the studio with the sole purpose of promoting local artists.
