= The Lights Out =

American rock band

- The Lights Out: Rishava Green (lead vocals/guitar), Jesse James (guitar/vocals), Adam Ritchie (lead guitar/vocals) and Matt King (bass/vocals)

Background information
- Origin: Boston, Massachusetts, United States
- Genres: Rock
- Years active: 2005 – present
- Label: (unsigned)
- Members: Rishava Green; Jesse James; Matt King; Adam Ritchie
- Website: thelightsout.com

The Lights Out is a rock band that formed in 2005 in Boston, Massachusetts. A band not signed to a major record label, they have nevertheless been able to sustain themselves, self-releasing a string of EPs and full-length albums since 2007.

== Biography ==
The band started when Rishava Green and Matt King met in the Model Café in Allston, Massachusetts, where they decided to form a band before ever playing a note together. Green had recently written and recorded eleven tracks that were later named Douglas Sessions '05 with the purpose of attracting the right band members. In October 2006, Jesse James joined on drums. Adam Ritchie joined on guitar in June 2007. Both James and Ritchie were attending Syracuse University at that time, but never met before joining the band. In October of that same year the band released their self-titled EP, The Lights Out (EP). Late 2007 saw the band "blitzing" Boston with a string of shows in support of the record.

In June 2008, the band released their follow-up five-song EP, ¡Heist!.

By September 2009, the band had taken the songs from their two previous EPs and put them together with a new batch of compositions to create their first LP, Color Machine. That year the band also became a semifinalist in the WBCN Rock & Roll Rumble and headlined a showcase at CMJ Music Marathon. In May they played Gillette Stadium to open the New England Patriots' 2009 season.

In 2010 the band's song "Gottagetouttahere", from Color Machine, was featured in an Absolut Vodka ad and was featured in Vh1’s Tough Love Couples. The music video for the song, produced by Boston Music Awards Video of The Year director Mike Gill, was released in October. That fall, the band released their third EP, Rock Pony. The EP’s cover caused a stir, and for Halloween the band dressed and performed as Madonna.

The band self-released their second LP, Primetime, on January 1, 2011. To promote the album, a theme record about what it is like to be in a band, the band held a mock auction for their tour van named "Tim".

The band's third LP, On Fire, was released on June 1, 2012, and a track from the album, "Today Was The Day", was selected as MP3 of the Week by The Boston Phoenix. Songs from On Fire were featured on MTV and the band supported the album with an appearance at South By Southwest.

T.R.I.P. is the band's fourth LP. The album, mainly about parallel realities, is synchronized with a wearable light show invented by the band. It is also the first studio album ever released on a can of craft beer. The band supported the album by opening for Andrew W.K. and the Dream Theater, King's X and Dixie Dregs side project called The Jelly Jam.

== Members ==
- Rishava Green - lead vocals, guitar
- Jesse James - drums, vocals
- Matt King - bass, vocals
- Adam Ritchie - lead guitar, vocals

== Discography ==
=== LPs ===
- T.R.I.P. (2017)
- On Fire (2012)
- Primetime (2011)
- Color Machine (2009)

=== Studio sessions ===
- Douglas Sessions '05 (2005)

=== EPs ===
- Rock Pony (2010)
- ¡Heist! (2008)
- The Lights Out (2007)
