= Flag of the Russian-American Company =

- Use: Other
- Adopted: 1806; 220 years ago
- Relinquished: 1867
- Design: Horizontal white-blue-red tricolor of the flag of Russia, with the white stripe broader than the other two, and containing a double-headed eagle

The flag of the Russian-American Company, first adopted in 1806, consisted of a variation of the horizontal white-blue-red tricolor of the flag of Russia, but with the white stripe broader than the other two, and containing a double-headed eagle symbol of the company. The exact form and placement of the eagle was subject to variations, before Russian rule over Alaska ended in 1867.

== History ==
=== Origins ===
On 28 September (10 October, new style), 1806, Emperor Alexander I of Russia made a notation on the design submitted to him of a new flag for the Russian-American Company: "So be it", and added his cypher, thereby approving the first flag in Russia's history to be used by an Imperial chartered company.

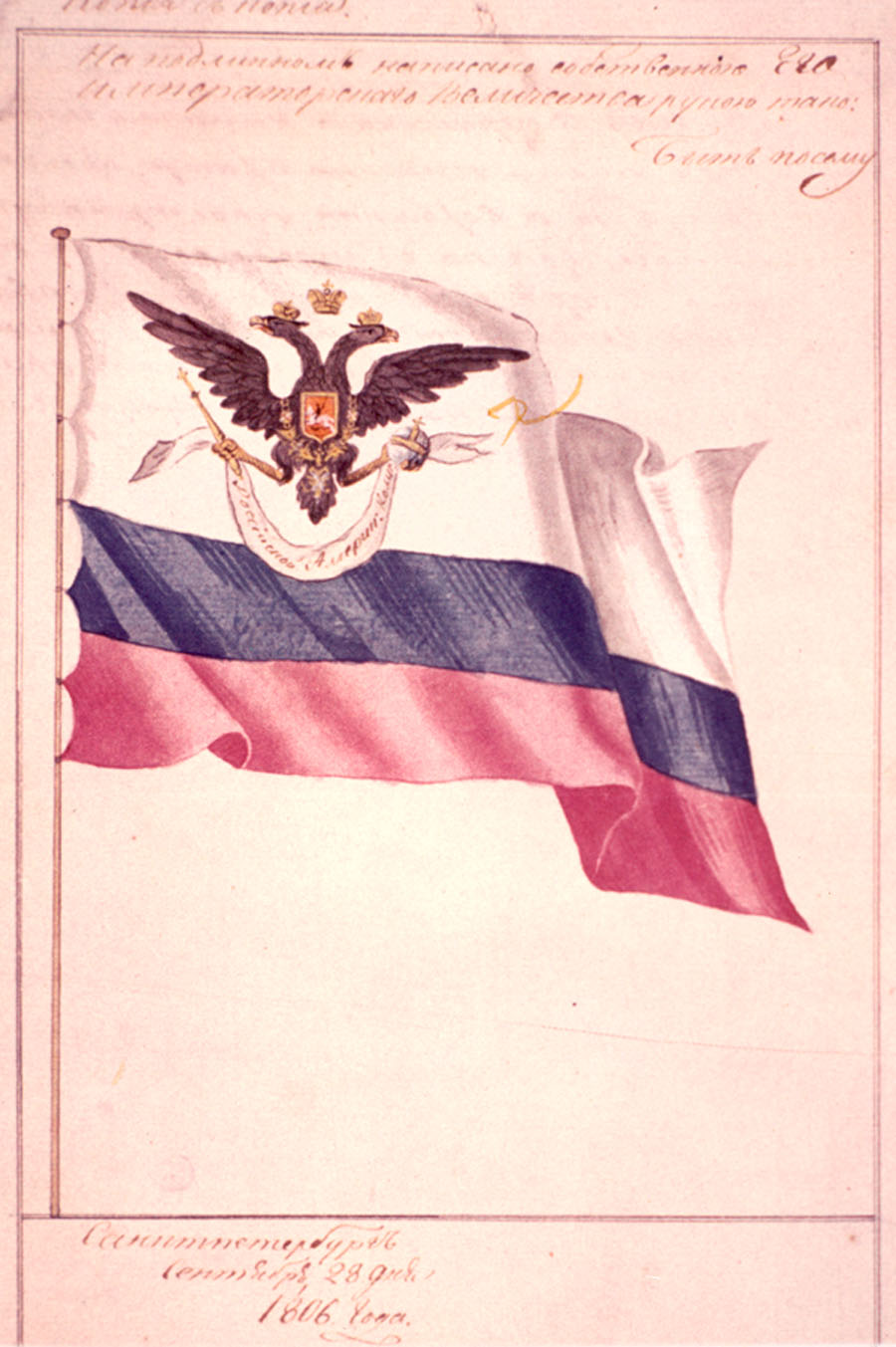
Russian-American Company flag design authorised by Alexander I of Russia in 1806

After Imperial confirmation, the ukaz was heard in the Senate, and on 19 October 1806 was sent for execution to the main office of the Russian-American Company (RAC), and also to the Admiralty and Commerce colleges. The Emperor himself was a shareholder in the new Company, as were other members of the Imperial family and many of Saint Petersburg's aristocracy and society. Indeed, following the formation of the RAC as Russia's first joint-stock company by Imperial decree in 1799, and the relocation of its headquarters from Irkutsk to the Imperial capital in 1801, the company, referred to in Russian as "Under His Imperial Majesty's supreme protection Russian-American Company" (Russian: "Под высочайшим Его Императорского Величества покровительством Российская-Американская Компания - Pod wysochaĭshim Jego Imperatorskogo Welichestwa pokrovitelʹstwom Rossiĭskaja-Amerikanskaja Kompanija") had changed from a predominantly merchant-class enterprise to a "favourite" of Russia's upper classes.

The company flag design of 1806 placed the Imperial eagle in the upper left quarter of Russia's commercial flag. In order to make the State symbol unobstructed and more visible, the size of the upper (white) stripe was enlarged to cover roughly one half of the flag's height. (The normal height-proportions of Russia's commercial flag were equal thirds.) The Imperial eagle carried a scroll which dipped into the blue stripe, also for more visibility. It bore the inscription "Russian American Company's" (Russian:Россійской Американской Компаніи). The symbolism of the scroll beneath the Imperial eagle complemented the official version of the company's name "Under His Imperial Majesty's supreme protection ..."

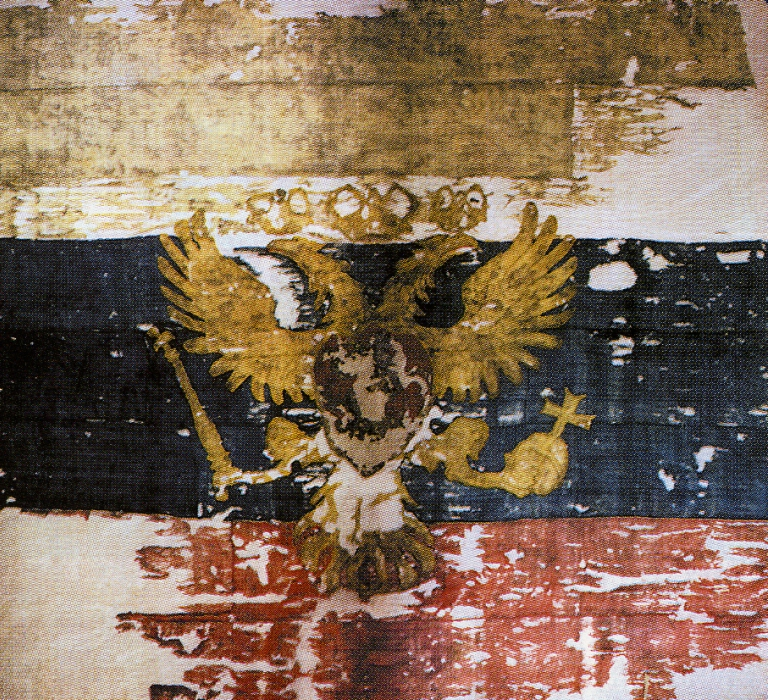
Flag of the Tsar of Moscow

Russian commercial flag, 1705

The new design had precedents in Russian history. In 1693, Tsar Peter I had used a white-blue-red horizontally-striped flag with a two-headed eagle in gold in the centre, called the "Flag of the Tsar of Moscow". Also in 1693, Russian merchant ships flew a white flag with a black double-headed eagle in the centre. In 1705, by imperial decree, Peter I established the Russian commercial flag.

=== Usage ===
In August 1803, the ships for Russia's first circumnavigation of the globe sailed from Kronstadt under the command of Ivan Kruzenstern (Adam Johann von Krusenstern). Russia's Minister of Commerce, Nikolay Petrovich Rumyantsev, who would later undertake the project of introducing the new RAC flag,sponsored the expedition, which carried RAC Director Court Chamberlain Nikolay Petrovich Rezanov as Russia's first Ambassador to Japan. The Company underwrote the expedition's expenses. There was some concern as to which flag the ships of the expedition, Neva and Nadezhda, would carry: Russia's commercial flag - as the sponsors were the Minister of Commerce and the RAC — or Russia's naval ensign of St. Andrew — as Imperial Russian Navy personnel commanded and crewed the ships. The Emperor himself granted permission for the use of the naval ensign, as this mission was to carry an Imperial Ambassador to a foreign court as well as to open new markets in China to the company.

Naval ensign of Russia, 1720

The use of the naval ensign aboard the Neva eventually caused difficulties for Kruzenstern in Qing China. When the Russians arrived in Macao, the Chinese refused to give permission for a "ship of war" to trade in Canton. Because Kruzenstern had arrived flying the St. Andrew's ensign aboard the Nadezhda, he had to consider "changing" the Neva into a merchant vessel for purposes of trade.

The relationship of the Navy to the Company continued to perplex the naval officers who dealt with the company. During a visit to New Archangel (present-day Sitka in Alaska) in 1818, Captain V.M. Golovnin of the frigate Kamchatka had to decide what to do about official salutes to the fortress' flag. He reasoned that "Taking into account that the Company, although a commercial venture, nevertheless owns extensive territory, enjoys sovereign patronage, and has the Imperial Russian coat-of-arms on its commercial flag. A Company flag…in many ways deserves preference over the ordinary commercial flag" Golovnin returned the cannon salutes of the New Archangel Fort with an equal number, an honour usually reserved for naval vessels and forts, and established a precedent to equate the company's flag with the Naval ensign. That same year the new governor of the colonies, naval Captain L.A. Hagemeister, instructed the administrator of Fortress Ross: "If the vessel is Russian or sent from the Chief Administrator, order the white Russian naval flag, with the blue cross of St. Andrew, or the Company flag to be raised on the fore-top gallant. Any foreign vessel arriving with permission will have one of these."

Hagemeister's successor as the Company administrator, Lieutenant S.I. Yanovsky (in office 1818–1820), writing to Kirill Timofeyevich Khlebnikov, who was departing for California aboard the brig Il’mena, included instructions for the use of the company's flag in his "Secret instructions":

… "On your way there and back be careful of pirates, and for this [reason], when you sight a ship at sea, try to distance yourself from it; but if it is impossible to do so, then ready the artillery and crewmen in case of warfare, approach [it], raise the flag of the Russian-American Company, and, when you see that the enemy intends to attack you, exhort the crewmen to defend fearlessly the imperially conferred flag of the RAC and not to disgrace the glory of the Russian name…"

Flag of the British East India Company (1801)

Flag of the Dutch East India Company

The relationship between the Imperial government and the Russian-American company became increasingly symbiotic, necessitating the design of a new commercial flag that incorporated symbols which would identify it as a state-sponsored entity. Russia, (and in particular, Ivan Kruzenstern) had paid close attention to other countries' government-chartered commercial enterprises. Both English and Dutch merchants had distinctive flags which each identified the British Honourable East India Company and the Dutch East and West India companies, and were modified versions of their respective country's commercial flags.

=== Design variants ===
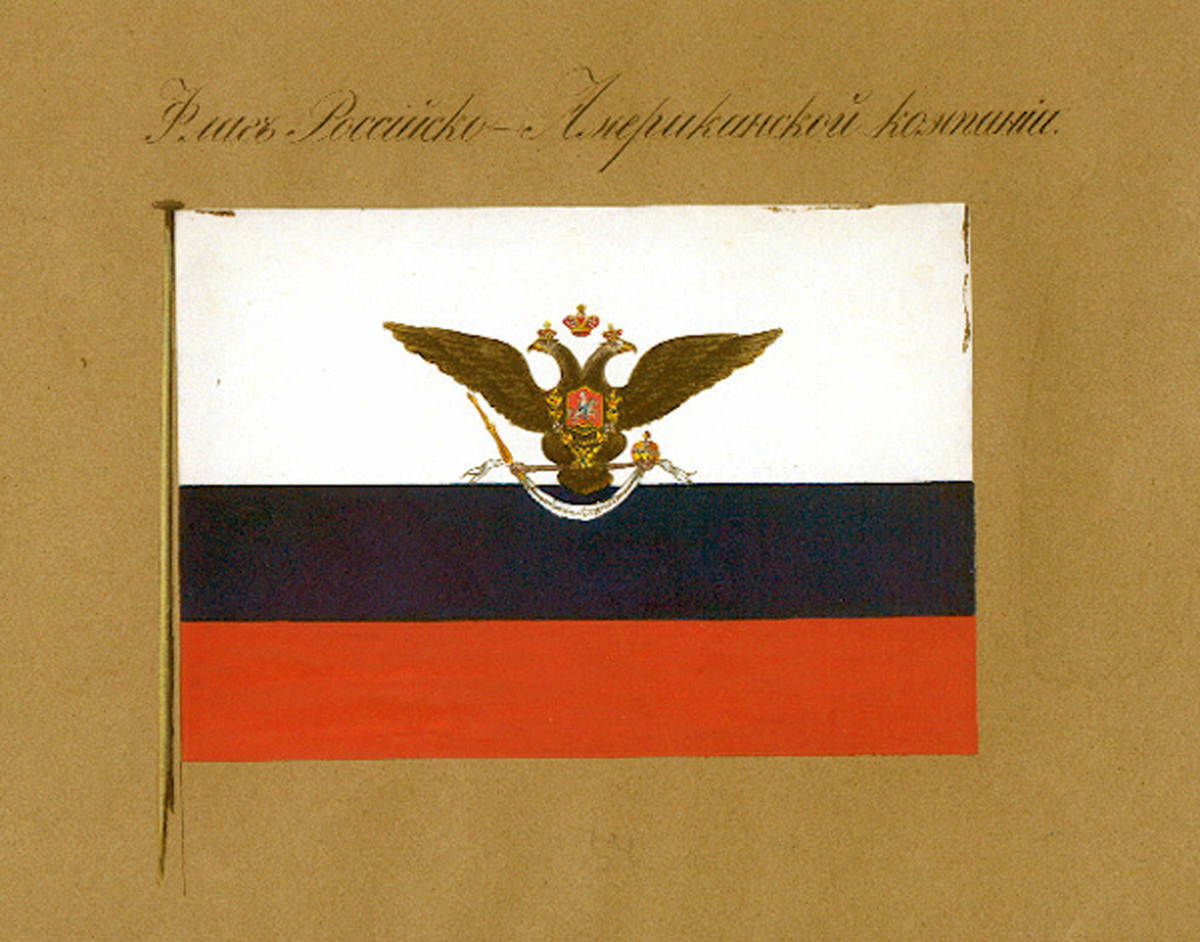
Flag of the Russian-American Company, 1828

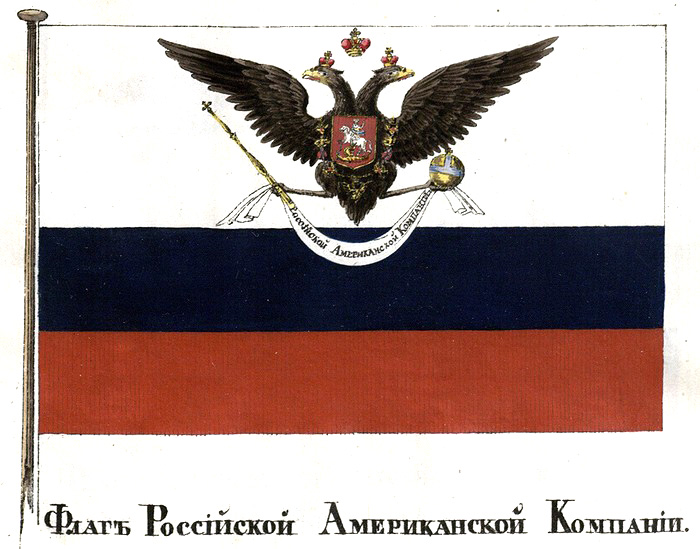
Flag of the Russian-American Company, 1835

The RAC flag underwent many changes during its 75-year history. There is only one known extant flag, in the Hermitage Museum's collection in Saint Petersburg, which serves as one guide to the flag's true appearance. However, little is known of its origins. The flag was received by the Hermitage in 1848–49 from the Historic Artillery History Museum, where, it most likely came from the old Hermitage collection, 1820s~

The overall design and dimensions correspond closely to the flag illustration in the 1828 "Flags, standards, and pennants of the Russian Empire and their use at present", one of the earliest official versions of the RAC flag other than the 1806 edict. A similar eagle-centered design occurs again in another governmental flag album, "Album of Standards, Flags and Pennants, used in the Russian Empire", dated 1835.

The production of RAC flags was carried out in Sitka by an individual assigned to make 6 to 10 flags annually "for vessels and by the colonies and ships". Because his occupation is listed in the same category as painters, one might assume that the image of the eagle on the white stripe was painted rather than applied in cloth. The Hermitage flag, made of silk, has a painted image. Khlebnikov lists this position in his description of colonial occupations in 1830. As each flag was individually painted, presumably by one man who served in this capacity for at most, three to five years, it would seem reasonable to assume that the many variations that exist in design and execution are attributable to the numerous painters employed over the company's 75-year history, while this would account for Sitka only. There were also RAC flags required for St. Petersburg, Kronstadt, and Okhotsk.

Many versions of the RAC flag appear in paintings of RAC ships and colonial establishments, and these seem to correspond to alterations in the flag's design in official sources. The earliest, von Langsdorf's "View of the establishment of the Russian-American Company at Norfolk Sound at Sitka" pleasingly shows the flag to be very similar to the original edict. Unfortunately this engraving was produced in 1812 from a sketch von Langsdorf made in 1805–06, before the creation of the company's flag. The engraver has clearly added the RAC flag based on the 1806 edict, so this earliest version cannot be considered an eye-witness account. Another illustration of Sitka, by Nikifor Chernyshev in 1809 also shows a company flag flying from the bastion, but has the eagle more centered on the white stripe. Friedrich Heinrich von Kittlitz's two drawings of Sitka done in June/July 1827 show RAC flags on both bastions and ships, and in both cases the eagle appears to be centered in the white stripe, or just slightly towards the hoist. Pavel Mikailov's delightful water-colour of Sitka harbour in September, 1827 shows no eagle on the flag flown from the bastion, but clearly shows the eagle placed in the upper quarter on the flag flown from the RAC ship CHICHAGOV anchored in the roads.

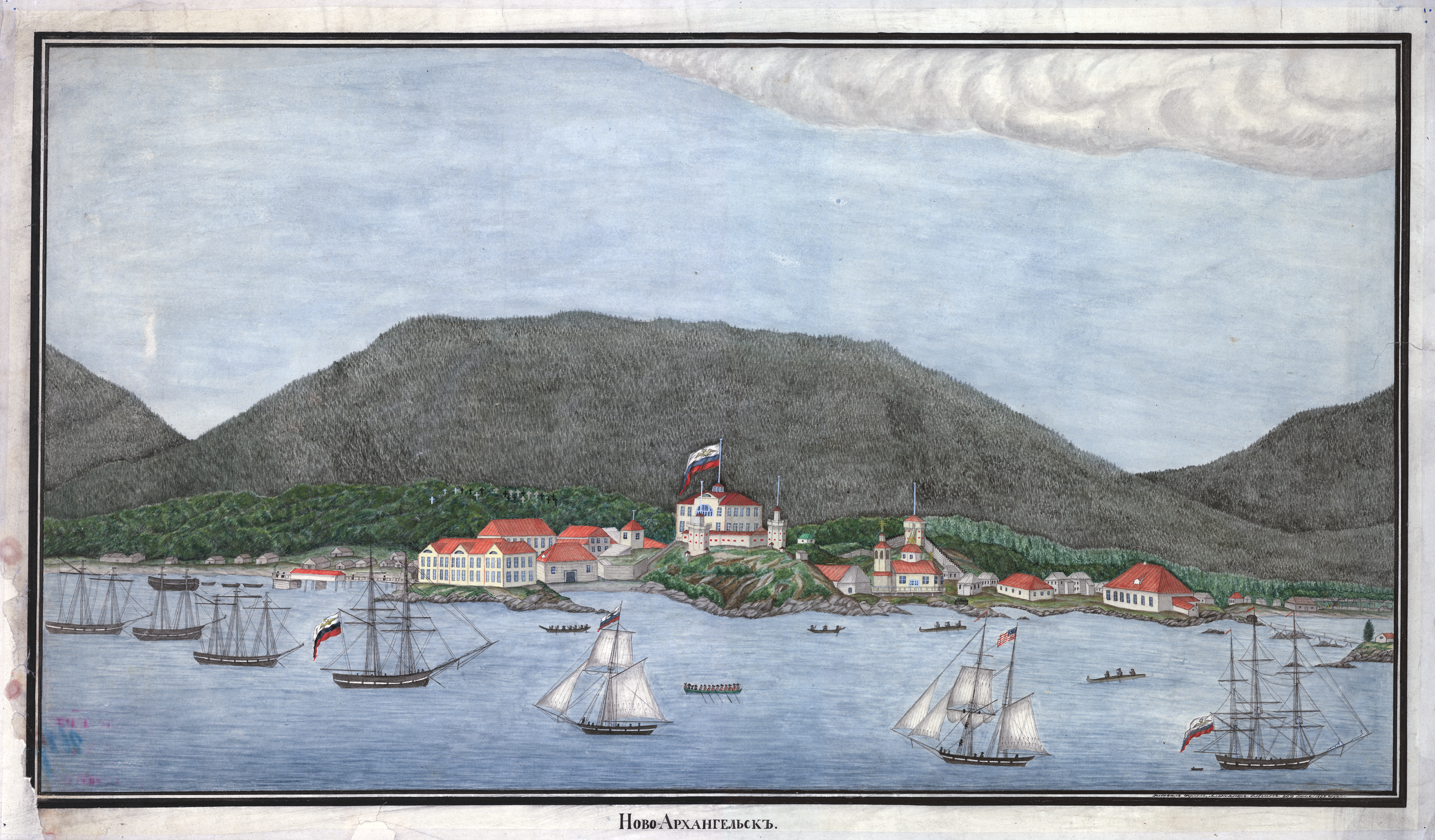
Aleksandr Ol'gin: View of New Archangel, 1837

Aleksandr Ol'gin's water-colour of July, 1837, shows several RAC flags flown from both bastion and ships in the harbour — all have a golden eagle placed in the upper quarter.

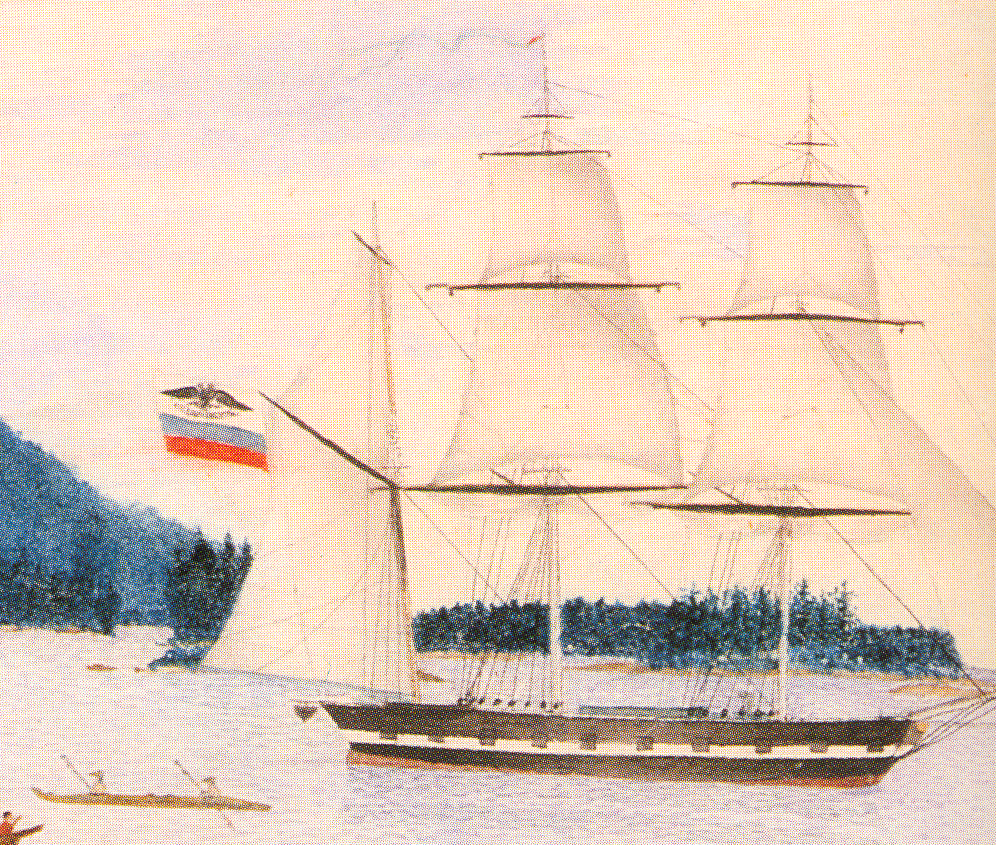
Sitka Harbour, 1840–1845

Two very detailed water-colours by RAC skipper Johann Bartram of Sitka harbour, done between 1840 and 1845 have precise depictions of the company's flag. Given Bartram's profession, both the details rendered of ships and boats as well as the flag lend an exactitude and veracity to the subject. The eagle in the flag is not only centered, but takes up most of the white stripe, and the scroll bearing the company's name does not extend into the blue stripe.

The scroll on the flag flying from the RAC ship IMPERATOR NIKOLAI I, painted in the 1850s, also does not dip into the blue stripe, but the eagle appears to have its wings "up" rather than down, as displayed in the flag. This could reflect the official change in 1857 to a "wings up" version of the Imperial eagle, and would correspond to another possibly unique version of the RAC flag depicted in a painting of the RAC ship SITKA in 1855. Once again the eagle is depicted in the upper quarter, with the scroll extending into the blue stripe, but the swallow tail of the flag's fly in unknown in other versions. A depiction of the RAC flag on a stock certificate dated 1845, issued in St. Petersburg shows another eagle with the "wings up" variation, but evidently without the scroll beneath. As this is an official document of the company, the flag depicted must be considered an official representation. With the official State changes to the "All Russian State Coat of Arms" occurring at least four times between 1806 and 1881, one can appreciate the difficulty in identifying one particular design as representative for the entire period.

=== Disappearance and legacies ===
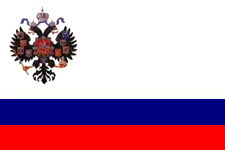
Nakhodka Harbour factory flag

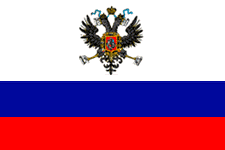
The ensign of the Russian Volunteer Fleet (Dobroflot) shipping company, 1881

A proposed territorial flag for Alaska designed by Paul Solka, Jr. in 1927, featuring the RAC flag in the canton

The Russian-American Company lowered its company flag in October, 1867, at Sitka, Alaska, signaling the end of the Company's, and the Russian Empire's, presence in North America. On 11 November 1869 Emperor Aleksandr II approved a flag for the Siberian Factories of Nakhodka Harbour, very reminiscent of the original 1806 RAC flag. The Russian-American Company was liquidated in 1881. The flag of the RAC however, continued to influence Russian flag design into the 20th century. On January 28, 1881, Emperor Aleksandr II approved the design for the flag of the Volunteer Fleet Company, clearly influenced in proportion and design by the RAC flag. Other companies also followed the same pattern: Society of Fisheries, Department of Turkestan and Blacksea-Dunaisky Basin Fisheries, and the Department of Transcaucasian Fisheries all employed a tri-coloured Russian commercial flag, the white stripe covering half the width of the flag, with the emblem placed in the upper quarter.

== See also ==
- Flag of Alaska
- Russian America
- Nikolay Rumyantsev
- Adam Johann von Krusenstern
- Nikolay Petrovich Rezanov
- Fort Ross
- Bodega Bay
