= Kamchatka (disambiguation) =

Kamchatka is a peninsula in northeast Russia.

Kamchatka may also refer to:

== Places ==
- Kamchatka Krai, federal administrative division of Russia covering the Kamchatka Peninsula established in 2007
- Kamchatka Oblast, former administrative division of Russia
- Kamchatka (river), river in the Kamchatka Peninsula, Russia
- Kamchatka Strait, strait in the Bering Sea

== Ships ==
- Kamchatka (1817), Russian frigate that circumnavigated the globe between 1817 and 1819 under Vasily Golovnin
- Russian frigate Kamchatka (1841), Russian steam frigate
- Kamchatka (ship), Russian steamship launched 1903

== Music ==
- Kamchatka (band), Swedish rock band
  - Kamchatka (album), 2005 album by Kamchatka
- "Kamchatka" (song), song by Soviet rock band Kino

== Other uses ==
- Kamchatka (film), 2002 Argentine film
- Kamchatka Vodka, brand of vodka made in Kentucky by Beam Inc.
- Kamchatka grayling
