= Roger Öjersson =

Swedish guitarist

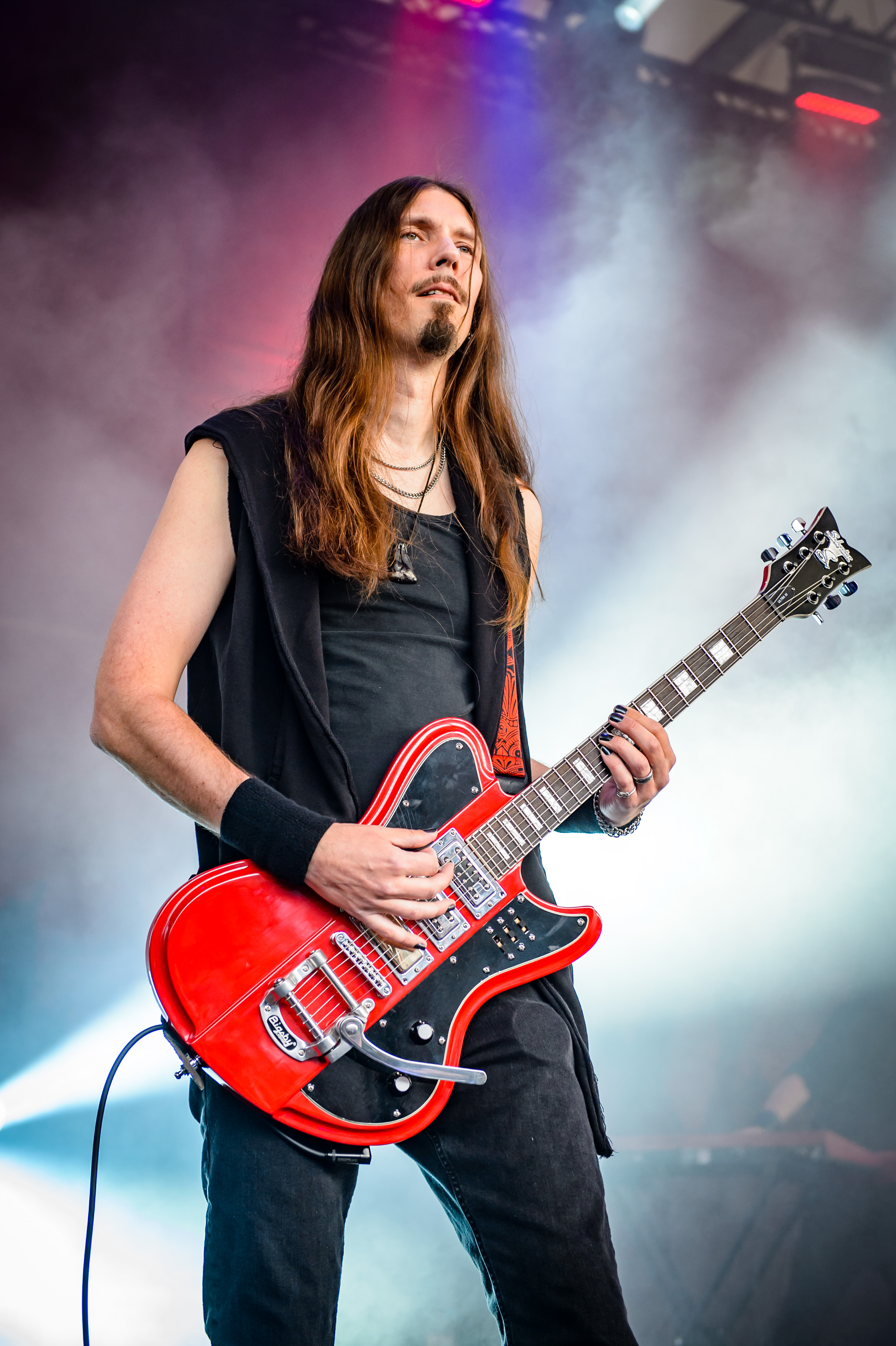
- Öjersson with Tiamat in 2018

Background information
- Born: March 8, 1976 (age 49)
- Origin: Varberg, Sweden
- Genres: Hard rock, progressive metal, progressive rock, gothic metal
- Instruments: Guitar, vocals, bass, keyboards
- Works: #Discography
- Years active: 1993–present
- Member of: Tiamat
- Formerly of: Kamchatka; Vildsvin; Pain of Salvation; Katatonia

Roger Öjersson is a Swedish musician, known as former bassist and co-lead vocalist of Kamchatka and current guitarist of Tiamat. He has also played guitar with Vildsvin, Pain of Salvation and Katatonia.

== Biography ==
He grew up playing the classical guitar and mandolin, originally being influenced by his grandfather who played flute, violin and many other instruments. In his mid teens he started the band Vildsvin together with Fredrik Thomander and Peter Månsson, where he was the lead guitarist. The band split up due to creative differences in 1997.

In 2001 he started the band Kamchatka together with guitarist Thomas "Juneor" Andersson and drummer Tobias Strandvik, Ojersson performed vocals and bass.

In 2010 he joined Tiamat as lead guitarist, touring with the band and playing guitar, keyboards and mandolin on their 2012 album, The Scarred People. In 2013, he briefly joined Pain of Salvation following the temporary departure of Ragnar Zolberg. He also played guitar on one track of their album Falling Home.

He departed Kamchatka in 2015, and joined Katatonia the following year. Playing on their albums The Fall of Hearts (2016), City Burials (2020) and Sky Void of Stars (2023). In 2021, he was voted 9th best prog guitarist, alongside fellow Katatonia guitarist Anders Nyström by MusicRadar readers. In late 2024, Ojersson's Facebook stated he was formerly of Katatonia, and when a new lineup was announced in April 2025, following the departure of Nystrom the previous month, it did not include Ojersson.

== Discography ==
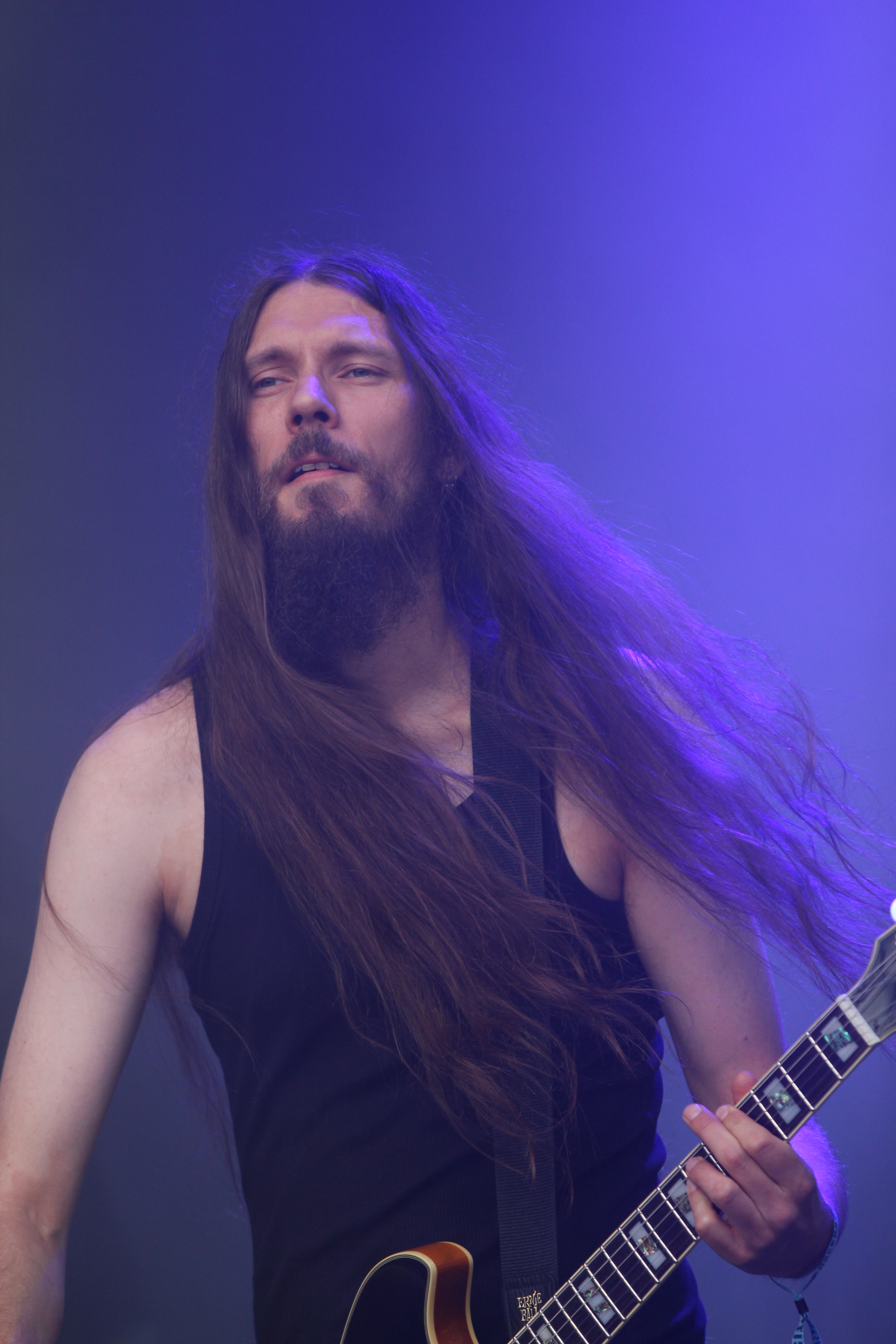
Ojersson with Tiamat in 2015

- 1995 - Vildsvin - Grisfesten
- 1995 - Martin Marks - Breath Of Life
- 1996 - Vildsvin - Till Eder Tjänst
- 1997 - Vildsvin - Iskallt Begär
- 2002 - Dan G. Ahlgren - Canto Ergo Sum
- 2005 - Kamchatka - Kamchatka
- 2007 - Kamchatka - Volume II
- 2009 - Kamchatka - Volume III
- 2011 - Kamchatka - Bury Your Roots
- 2012 - Tiamat - The Scarred People
- 2014 - Pain Of Salvation - Falling Home
- 2016 - Katatonia - The Fall Of Hearts
- 2020 - Katatonia - City Burials
- 2023 - Katatonia - Sky Void of Stars
