= Per Wiberg =

Swedish musician

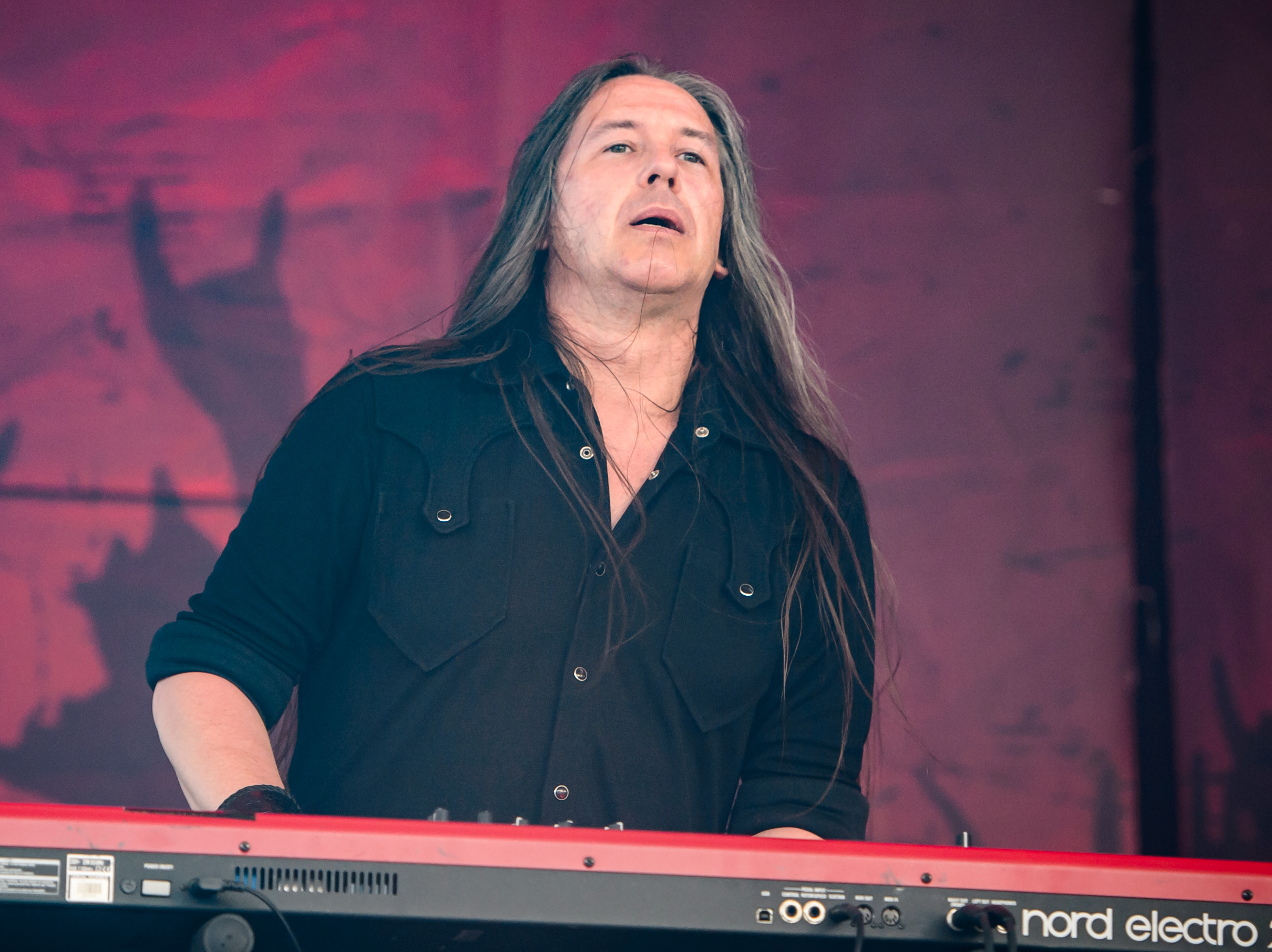
- Wiberg performing with Tiamat in 2018

Background information
- Born: 8 June 1968 (age 58); Borlänge, Sweden
- Origin: Stockholm, Sweden
- Genres: Death metal, progressive metal, progressive rock, stoner rock
- Occupations: Musician, songwriter
- Instruments: Keyboards, bass, vocals, guitar
- Years active: 1993-present
- Member of: Spiritual Beggars; Kamchatka
- Formerly of: Opeth

Per Jonas Wiberg (born 8 June 1968) is a Swedish musician who is a member of the bands Spiritual Beggars (1998–) as akeyboardist, King Hobo (2007–) as keyboardist, guitarist, and vocalist, Kamchatka (2015–) as bassist and vocalist, Switchblade (2020–) as bassist, and his solo band Per Wiberg (2019–) in multi-instrumental capacity.

Wiberg was formerly in the bands Death Organ (1993–1997) as an organist, Boom Club (1994) as a vocalist, and Opeth (2003–2011) as keyboardist and backing vocalist.

Before joining Spiritual Beggars, Wiberg was a member of Borlänge-based band Death Organ. He has fronted the band Boom Club, of the same area.

Wiberg toured with Opeth from the 2003 Deliverance/Damnation tour onward, and joined Opeth officially in 2005. Wiberg provided backing vocals for Opeth in addition to keyboard. It was announced on 6 April 2011 that Wiberg was leaving Opeth as part of a mutual decision between him and the other band members.

Wiberg played the keyboard in the intro to "Enemy Within" by melodic death metal band Arch Enemy. He played piano on Swedish progressive rock band Anekdoten's 1993 release Vemod.

In 2007, Wiberg collaborated on a project called King Hobo with Clutch drummer Jean-Paul Gaster and Kamchatka guitarist Thomas Andersson.

Since 2012, he has been a live musician for Swedish doom metal band Candlemass as well as joining Swedish band Switchblade on selected dates as a keyboard player. He also played bass when needed.

Wiberg has collaborated on all Big Scenic Nowhere releases since 2019, including two studio albums and two EPs.

== Equipment ==
Per Wiberg uses Nord & Mellotron keyboards, EBS & Blackstar amps, and Fender & Gibson guitars and basses.

== Discography ==
Release	Band	Instrument	Membership	Year
Lamentations (Live at Shepherd's Bush Empire 2003) (DVD)	Opeth	Keyboards	Ex-Member	2003
Ghost Reveries	Opeth	Various - Grand piano, Hammond organ, Mellotron, & Moog synthesizer	Ex-Member	2005
The Roundhouse Tapes	Opeth	Keyboards	Ex-Member	2007
Watershed	Opeth	Keyboards	Ex-Member	2008
God of War: Blood & Metal	Opeth	Keyboards	Ex-Member	2010
In Live Concert at the Royal Albert Hall	Opeth	Keyboards	Ex-Member	2010
The Throat of Winter (7-inch)	Opeth	Keyboards	Ex-Member	2011
Heritage	Opeth	Keyboards	Ex-Member	2011
The Devil's Orchard - Live at Rock Hard Festival 2009	Opeth	Keyboards	Ex-Member	2011
Head Without Eyes	Per Wiberg	Vocals, Bass guitar, Guitars, Keyboards, Photography, Production, Songwriting	Current	2019
All Is Well In The Land Of The Living	Per Wiberg	Vocals, Bass guitar, Guitars, Keyboards, Production, Songwriting	Current	2021
The Serpent's Here	Per Wiberg	Vocals, Bass guitar, Guitars, Keyboards, Production, Songwriting	Current	2024

=== With Spiritual Beggars ===
- Mantra III (1998)
- Violet Karma 10-inch (1998)
- Ad Astra (2000)
- It's Over split 7-inch with Grand Magus (2001)
- On Fire (2002)
- Demons (2005)
- Live Fire DVD (2005)
- Return to Zero (2010)
- Return to Live: Loud Park 2010 (2011)
- Earth Blues (2013)
- Spiritual Beggars - Reissue (2013)
- Sunrise to Sundown (2016)
- Thumbsucker/Stoned Woman 7-inch (2016)
- European Rock Invasion Vol 1: Svenskt Anfall split 12-inch with Siena Root & Truckfighters (2021)

=== With Kamchatka ===
- The Search Goes On (2014)
- Doorknocker Blues 7-inch (2014)
- Ain't Fallin' (digital single) (2014)
- Long Road Made of Gold (2015)
- Devil Dance (digital single) (2016)
- No One That Can Tell (digital single) (2016)
- Stone Cold Shaky Bones/Midnight Charmer 7-inch (2018)
- Hoodoo Lightning (2019)

=== With Switchblade ===
- Switchblade - "2012" (album) (2012)
- Switchblade - "2016" (album) (2016)

=== With Slutavverkning ===
- Slutavverkning - "Levande Charader" (album) (2023)
- Slutavverkning - "Skräp" (EP) (2023)
- Slutavverkning - "Enligt Gällande Rutiner" (album) (2026)

=== With Mojobone ===
- Tales From the Bone (1999)
- Crossroad Message (2002)
- Cowboy Mode (2010)
- Crossroad Message & Tales From the Bone - Reissue (2010)

=== With King Hobo ===
- King Hobo (2008)
- Mauga (2019)

=== With Death Organ ===
- 9 to 5 (1995)
- Universal Stripsearch (1997)

=== With Boom Club ===
- Buy One or Be One (1994)

=== Guest appearances ===
- Anekdoten - Vemod (1993)
- Anekdoten - Chapters (2009)
- Anekdoten - Until All the Ghosts Are Gone (2015)
- Arch Enemy - Burning Bridges (1999)
- Arch Enemy - Wages of Sin (2001)
- Arch Enemy - Anthems of Rebellion (2003)
- Arch Enemy - Rise of the Tyrant (2007) (uncredited on the album)
- Arch Enemy - Khaos Legions (2011)
- Arch Enemy - War Eternal (2014)
- Arch Enemy - Covered in Blood (2019)
- Apollo - Waterdevils (2016)
- Automatism - Sonar Split EP with Pavallion (2019)
- Automatism - Immersion (2020)
- Axe Dragger - Axe Dragger (2026)
- Bacon - Like It Black (2010)
- Bacon Brothers - Pit Stop (2000)
- The Bakerton Group - El Rojo (2009)
- Beat Under Control - The Introduction (2004)
- Big Scenic Nowhere - Dying on the Mountain (2019)
- Big Scenic Nowhere - Vision Beyond Horizon (2020)
- Big Scenic Nowhere - Lavender Blues (2020)
- Big Scenic Nowhere - The Long Morrow (2022)
- Big Scenic Nowhere - The Waydown (2024)
- Big Scenic Nowhere - My God/Aqualung Redux (2024)
- cKy - Lost in Departures (2021)
- Conny Bloom - Been There, Done What Live! (2003)
- Candlemass - Psalms for the Dead (2012)
- Candlemass - (Candlemass vs Entombed, Limited edition CD, recorded for Sweden Rock Magazine's 100th issue)(2013)
- Carcass - Despicable (2020)
- Carcass - Torn Arteries (2021)
- Disrupted - Stinking Death (2025)
- Dool - Summerland (2020)
- Dotty Blue - Perfect Free Choice (2009)
- Dun Ringill - Welcome (2019)
- Dun Ringill - Library of Death (2020)
- Dun Ringill - Where The Old Gods Play Act I (2023)
- Dun Ringill - Where The Old Gods Play Act II (2025)
- Electric Hydra - From The Fallen (2026)
- Enslaved - Roadburn Live (2017)
- Fear Falls Burning - Function Collapse Live (2021)
- General Surgery - Split w/ Bodybag (2017)
- Greenleaf - Nest of Vipers (2012)
- Grand Magus - Sword Songs (2016)
- Hexandagger - Nine of Swords 7-inch (2016)
- Hans Hjelm - Into the Night (2024)
- Hans Hjelm - The Night Electronic (2026)
- Sivert Høyem - Endless Love (2014)
- Illt - Humanity (2026)
- Ulf Ivarsson/Bill Laswell - Nammu (2022)
- Kamchatka - Volume III (2009)
- Kamchatka - Bury Your Roots (2011)
- Little Chris - At Last (2002)
- Mirror Of My Soul - October Is Rising (2026)
- Mirror Queen - Starliner/Career Of Evil (2016)
- Mount Mary - Mount Mary (2021)
- Mount Mary - Diamonds Of A Fool (2023)
- The Mushroom River Band - Music for the World Beyond (2000)
- Nate Bergman - Metaphysical Change (2022)
- Oaf - "Birth School Oaf Death" (2013)
- Renaissance of Fools - Fear, Hope & Frustration (2011)
- Roadhouse Diet - Won't Bend or Break (2018)
- Roadhouse Diet - Electric Devilry (2019)
- Science - Weird Science (2023)
- Sista Maj - Localized Pockets of Negative Entropy (2018)
- Sista Maj - The Extreme Limit (2019)
- Sky High - Highlights 1978-1998 (1998)
- Sky High - Bluester (1999)
- Sky High - On the Cover: 25 Years of Madness (2002)
- Sky High - Soul Survivor (2004)
- Sky High - Have Guitar Will Travel - Reissue ( 2005)
- Sky High - Safe Sex Live - Reissue ( 2005)
- Sky High - 28 Years of Madness DVD (2006)
- Sky High - Stone & Gravel (2015)
- Sky High - 20 Från Fyrtio (2020)
- Sovereign Eagle - Sovereign Eagle (2022)
- Thoughts & Prayers - Alive In The Night Of The Wicked - PA version (2022)
- Tungsinnet - Det Sjunde Sinnet (2026)
- Vokonis - Odyssey (2021)
- Vokonis - Null & Void (2021)
- Watertouch - We Never Went to the Moon (2004)
