= El Rojo =

Studio album by The Bakerton Group
- Released: February 17, 2009
- Recorded: November 2008 at the Magpie Cage in Baltimore, Maryland
- Genre: Blues-rock; Psychedelic rock Jam band Jazz
- Length: 47:19
- Label: Weathermaker Music
- Producer: J. Robbins

The Bakerton Group chronology
The Bakerton Group (2007)	El Rojo (2009)

Professional ratings
Review scores
Source	Rating
Artistdirect	4/5 stars

El Rojo is the second full-length studio album by The Bakerton Group, otherwise known as "the psychedelic instrumental jazz-laden alter ego" of Clutch. Released in 2009, the album marks the debut of keyboardist Per Wiberg (then of Opeth), who replaced Mick Schauer.

== Background ==
The title of the album began as the working title for a song that was never included on the album. "El Rojo" was used because it reminded the band of the progressive rock band King Crimson. Dan Maines further elaborated upon the King Crimson allusion, noting that Fallon intended El Rojo (Spanish for "the red one") as a reference to Red.

However, Neil Fallon has given another explanation for the title which indicated that "El Rojo" was:

a vague character on a celestial level. I think of El Rojo as that character. There's no back-story written about it. The way I look at the album art and listen to the music, I see it as a vague, celestial Don Quixote type character, bouncing around the galaxy from planet to planet.

As Fallon explains, "Bill Proger's Galaxy" makes reference to a pseudonym adopted by a friend:

Bill Proger is a fictional character that a friend of ours, from way back when, came up with. We were doing a show, and there was a band that didn't think very highly of our friend. We were all there, and he was kind of hiding out. He told us that if they asked who he was, we were to tell them his name was Bill Proger. We don't really know where he got the name from, but it's been a running joke since 1991 when it happened [Laughs]. It started as a working title. The song was just called "Bill Proger." Then it turned into a really long, epic song, so we just threw "Galaxy" on the end of it.

The Bakerton Group first met Per Wiberg while the latter was touring with Spiritual Beggars and then again when Wiberg toured with Opeth. During the Opeth tour, The Bakerton Group invited Wiberg to jam on stage with them and, based on that chemistry, asked Wiberg to join the band for the El Rojo recording sessions. Opeth's tour scheduling allowed for Wiberg to collaborate with the band in the studio.

== Track listing ==
No.	Title	Length
1.	"Time Horizon"	1:44
2.	"Chancellor"	4:12
3.	"Peruvian Airspace"	3:24
4.	"Bien Clásico"	3:40
5.	"Life on Lars"	6:58
6.	"M.(F).H.S."	3:07
7.	"The Gigantomakhia"	4:53
8.	"Work 'Em"	7:04
9.	"Last Orbit"	5:29
10.	"Bill Proger's Galaxy"	6:48
Total length:		47:19

== Personnel ==
- Neil Fallon – Guitar
- Tim Sult – Guitar
- Dan Maines – Bass guitar
- Jean-Paul Gaster – Drums
- Per Wiberg – Keyboards
- J. Robbins – Producer
