= On Fire (Spiritual Beggars album) =

Studio album by Spiritual Beggars
- Released: 2 November 2002
- Genre: Stoner metal, stoner rock, heavy metal
- Length: 46:20
- Label: Music for Nations/Koch
- Producer: Michael Amott, Rickard Bengtsson

Spiritual Beggars chronology
Ad Astra (2000)	On Fire (2002)	Demons (2005)

Professional ratings
Review scores
Source	Rating
AllMusic	4/5 stars

On Fire is an album by the Swedish stoner metal band Spiritual Beggars. It was released on 2 November 2002.

== Track listing ==
All songs written by Michael Amott, except where noted. Arranged by Spiritual Beggars.

1. Street Fighting Saviours – 4:22 (Amott, Per Wiberg)
2. Young Man, Old Soul – 3:18
3. Killing Time – 3:37 (Amott, Ludwig Witt)
4. Fools Gold – 4:01
5. Black Feathers – 6:29
6. Beneath the Skin – 3:51
7. Fejee Mermaid – 1:59
8. Dance of the Dragon King – 3:04
9. Tall Tales – 4:28
10. The Lunatic Fringe – 5:19
11. Look Back – 5:27 (Amott, Janne "JB" Christoffersson)

Bonus tracks (Japanese edition)

1. Burden of Dreams – 5:27 (2002 digipak edition and 2007 reissue)
2. Blood of The Sun – 3:23 (Leslie West, Felix Pappalardi, Gail Collins)

== Personnel ==
- Janne "JB" Christoffersson: vocals
- Michael Amott: acoustic and electric guitars
- Per Wiberg: keyboards, organ, piano, vocals
- Roger Nilsson: bass guitar
- Ludwig Witt: drums, percussion

Production

- Produced by Michael Amott and Rickard Bengtsson
- Engineers, mixing: Andy Sneap, Fredrik Nordström, Rickard Bengtsson
- Mastering: Goran Finnburg
