= JB (Swedish musician) =

Swedish singer and guitarist (born 1970)

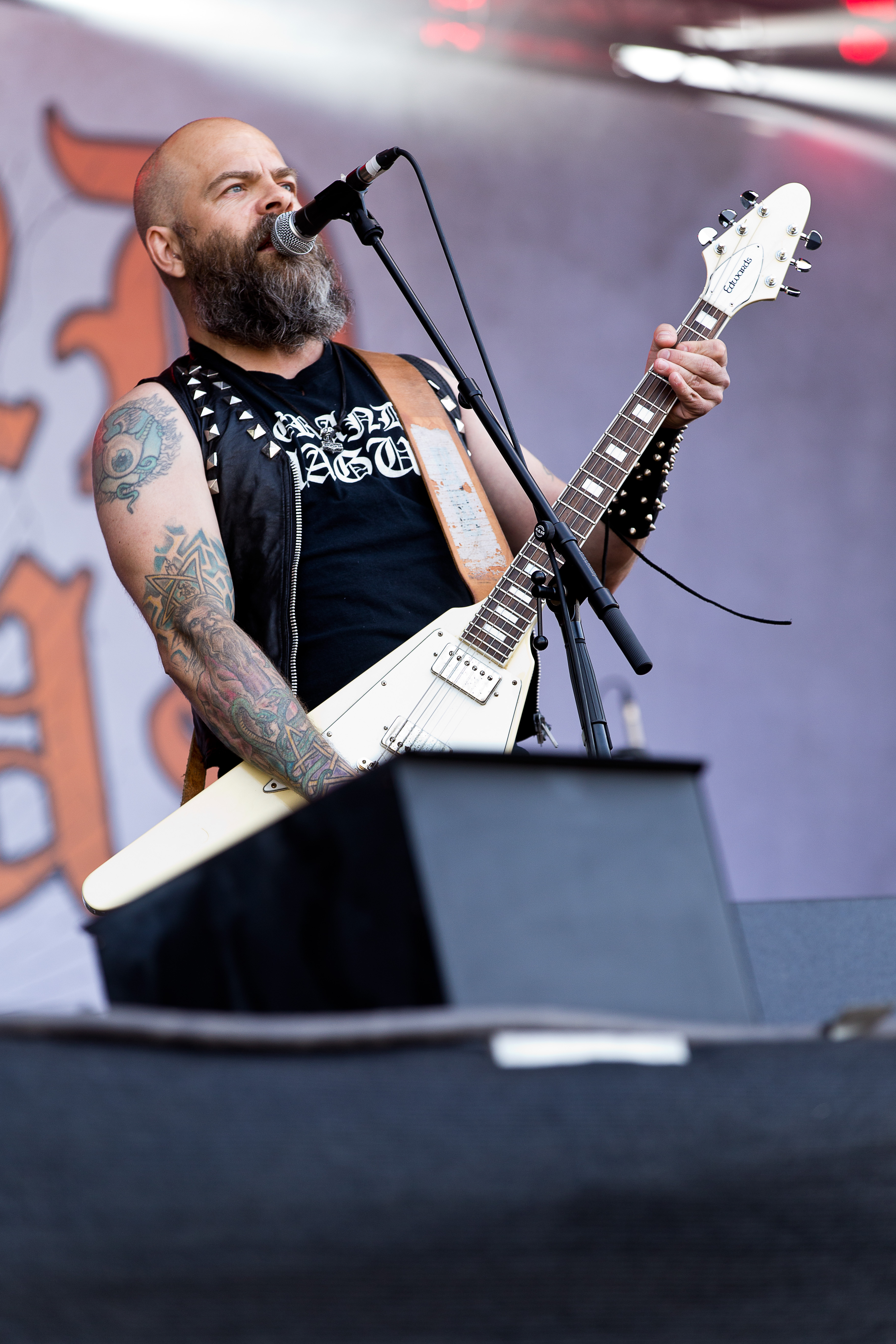
Christoffersson at Rockharz Open Air 2016

Janne "JB" Christoffersson is a Swedish singer and guitarist. He has been the guitarist and singer for the heavy metal band Grand Magus since 1996. He was also the singer for the stoner metal band Spiritual Beggars between 2002 and 2010. In August 2013, JB was announced as a guest on the Ayreon album The Theory of Everything.

== Discography ==
=== With Grand Magus ===
==== Albums ====
- Grand Magus (2001)
- Monument (2003)
- Vargens återkomst (2005)
- Järnvilja (2008)
- Nordens hammare (2010)
- Jakten (2012)
- Triumf och makt (2014)
- Svärdets sånger (2016)
- Varggud (2019)

==== Singles ====
- "Vid midnatt blir de kloka" (2010)
- "Nordens hammare" (2010)
- "Triumf och makt" (2013)

=== With Andliga tiggare ===
- I brand (2002)
- Demoner (2005)

=== With Spiritual Beggars ===
- On Fire (2002)
- Demons (2005)
