= Vildsvin =

Swedish band

- Origin: Varberg, Sweden
- Genres: Rock, Alternative rock
- Years active: 1993–1998
- Labels: Jimmy Fun Music
- Members: Fredrik Thomander; Peter Månsson; Roger Öjersson

Vildsvin was a Swedish rock band from Varberg. They are known for their hits Saga utan lyckligt slut and Vi ses igen.

== Members ==
- Fredrik Thomander – vocals, bass
- Roger Öjersson – guitar
- Peter Månsson – drums

== Albums ==
- Grisfesten (1995)
- Till Eder Tjänst (1996)
- Iskallt Begär (1997)
