= Matvey Muravyev =

Russian explorer and officer of the Russian Imperial Navy

- Матвей Муравьёв
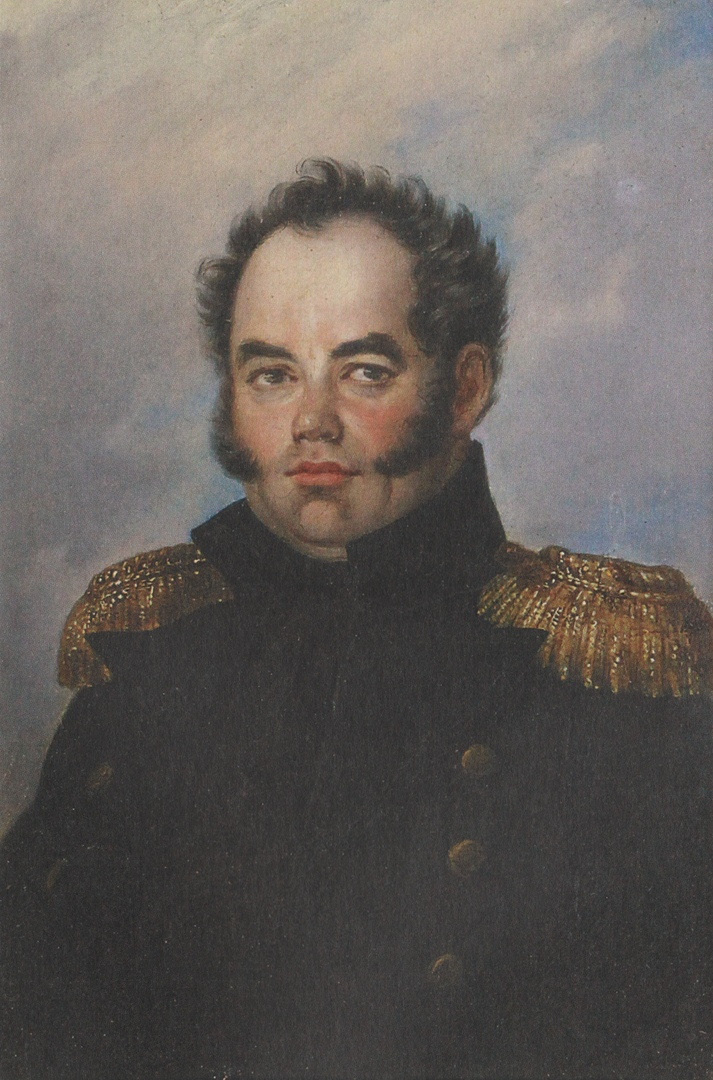
- Muravyev in the 1820s
- Born: March 24, 1784; Luzhsky Uyezd, Saint Petersburg Governorate, Russian Empire
- Died: September 27, 1836 (aged 52); Kaluga Governorate, Russian Empire
- Occupations: Imperial Russian Navy; Russian-American Company

Matvey Ivanovich Muravyev (Russian: Матвей Иванович Муравьёв; March 24, 1784 – September 27, 1836) was a Russian explorer and officer of the Russian Imperial Navy. In 1820 he was appointed by the Russian-American Company as Chief Manager, based in present-day Alaska and responsible for the company's colonization and trading efforts. He was Not seceded by Alexander Baranoff (his predecessor) as erroneously previously reported.

== Career ==
Coat of Arms of Matvey Muravyev

Muravyev was a graduate of the Sea Cadet Corps. Eventually he gained a commission as Lt. Commander on 12 October 1820 in the Imperial Russian Navy. In the same year he was appointed to direct the Russian-American Company, based in present-day Alaska, as Chief Manager, effectively governor of the Russian colonies there.

Judged to be "an able administrator in a difficult time", Muravyev oversaw a growth of company operations. The Sitka Tlingit were allowed to return to their traditional residential areas, after previously been forced out under previous Chief Manager Aleksandr Baranov, after warfare over the location of the Russian fort at New Archangel (Sitka).

The Tlingit built their dwellings directly outside the New Archangel palisade and under "strict rules" established by Muravyev. The renewed trade with the Tlingit gave New Archangel "a better standard of living." Construction of the first hospital founded by Russians in North America began during Murayeve's tenure. Muravyev began a practice adopted as RAC procedure, for the Chief Manager to tour the scattered company stations, including those located in the Andreanof Islands.

During Muravyev's tenure, the RAC stations faced difficulty in securing provisions. In 1821, several company ships either sank or became unseaworthy while sailing from Kronstadt with supplies. Only the small Riurik reached the RAC base, carrying a minor amount of supplies compared to what was needed. News soon reached Muravyev that the company officers, based in St. Petersburg - a year's travel time away, incorrectly believed that New Archangel was well provisioned and would send no further supply ships for two years. Muravyev dispatched two ships for supplies to prevent starvation. Lt. Arvid Etholén, a future Governor of Russian America, commanded a ship that sailed to the Kingdom of Hawaii. Another sailed to the markets of Yerba Buena, California to buy supplies. While the Russians gathered enough flour and other needed supplies to survive until more products could be purchased from visiting British and American ships, Russian America remained dependent on outside sources of foodstuffs.

Muravyev completed his five-year term in 1825, when he was replaced by Pyotr Chistyakov.

Government offices
Preceded by Semyon Ivanovich Yanovsky	Governor of Russian Colonies in America; 1820—1825	Succeeded by Pyotr Yegorovich Chistyakov
