= Pyotr Chistyakov =

Pyotr Yegorovich Chistyakov Пётр Егорович Чистяков

5th Governor of Russian America
- In office 14 October 1825 – 1 June 1830
- Preceded by: Matvey Muravyev
- Succeeded by: Ferdinand von Wrangel

Personal details
- Born: 1790 Tver Governorate, Russian Empire
- Died: 21 January 1862 (aged 71–72) Tver Governorate, Russian Empire

Pyotr Yegorovich Chistyakov (Russian: Пётр Егорович Чистяков, 1790 – 21 January 1862) was a Russian explorer, chief manager of the Russian-American Company and admiral.

Chistyakov joined the Sea Cadet Corps in 1802 and later served in the Russo-Turkish War (1806–12). He was appointed as the administrator of the Russian-American Company in 1825. He "was a hard-working, poor but honest man" who "lacked the vision for Alaska", was nonetheless "able administrator who followed the letter of the law..." Chistiakov introduced foxes to the Rat and Andreanof Islands, where Aleuts harvested them seasonally for the company. He advised the company board to begin whaling operations under an experienced whaler, a measure later enacted under his successor. While directing the company affairs, Chistyakov refused to allow an American missionary to proselytize outside New Archangel to neighboring Tlingit. Ferdinand von Wrangel was appointed as Chistyakov's replacement in 1830.

Chistyakov departed from New Archangel on 28 April 1831, leaving behind his Native Creole mistress, Matrena Fedorovna Artemev, two sons and a daughter. While the company purchased a residency in the Russian American capital, Chistyakov never arranged for them to reside in Russia with him. While back in the Russian Empire, Chistyakov continued his career in the Imperial Navy, eventually reaching the rank of admiral on 25 August 1856.

Government offices
Preceded by Matvey Ivanovich Muravyev	Governor of Russian Colonies in America; 1825–1830	Succeeded by Ferdinand von Wrangel
