= Return to Zero (Spiritual Beggars album) =

Studio album by Spiritual Beggars
- Released: 30 August 2010
- Recorded: February–June 2010 at The Sweetspot Studio
- Genre: Stoner metal
- Length: 51:07
- Label: InsideOut
- Producer: Rickard Bengtsson, Michael Amott

Spiritual Beggars chronology
Demons (2005)	Return to Zero (2010)	Earth Blues (2013)

Return to Zero is the seventh album by the Swedish stoner rock band Spiritual Beggars. It was released in Europe on 30 August 2010. It is their first album to feature Apollo Papathanasio of Firewind on vocals.

Formats included a single CD digipak and a single disc jewel case version. Vinyl was available in two colors, purple and black.

The album was rated an 83 out of 100 by MetalReviews.com.

== Track listing ==
All songs written by Michael Amott, except for where noted.

1. "Return to Zero (Intro)" (Per Wiberg) – 0:52
2. "Lost in Yesterday" – 4:49
3. "Star Born" (Amott, Wiberg, Ludwig Witt) – 3:06
4. "The Chaos of Rebirth" (Amott, Angela Gossow)– 5:21
5. "We Are Free" – 3:24
6. "Spirit of the Wind" – 5:52
7. "Coming Home" – 3:26
8. "Concrete Horizon" – 6:02
9. "A New Dawn Rising" – 4:42
10. "Believe in Me" – 6:41
11. "Dead Weight" (Wiberg) – 4:51
12. "The Road Less Travelled" – 3:45
13. "Time to Live" – 4:15 (Uriah Heep cover)

== Personnel ==
- Michael Amott – guitars, mandolin, guitar effects, producer
- Ludwig Witt – drums, percussion
- Per Wiberg – keyboards
- Sharlee D'Angelo – bass
- Apollo Papathanasio – vocals
