= The Bakerton Group (album) =

Studio album by The Bakerton Group
- Released: October 2007
- Recorded: August 2006 at the Magpie Cage in Baltimore, Maryland
- Genre: Blues-rock, psychedelic rock, jam band, stoner rock
- Length: 35:18
- Label: Emetic Records
- Producer: J. Robbins

The Bakerton Group chronology
The Bakerton Group (2007)	El Rojo (2009)

The Bakerton Group is the debut full-length studio album by American instrumental rock band The Bakerton Group. It was released in 2007 and contains eight tracks with a running time of over half an hour. Mick Schauer, who first joined Clutch in 2005, was also enlisted to The Bakerton Group as organist. The album design and artwork was done by Eno Kalkin.

== Track listing ==
No.	Title	Length
1.	"1906 Part II"	2:48
2.	"The Schickley"	3:22
3.	"Great Bakertons"	4:17
4.	"Bruce Bigsby"	4:12
5.	"Keyboards and Planets"	5:03
6.	"The Funky Navajo"	6:05
7.	"Last Orbit"	5:06
8.	"Many Gators"	4:24
Total length:		35:18

== Personnel ==
- Tim Sult – guitar
- Dan Maines – bass
- Jean-Paul Gaster – drums
- Mick Schauer – keyboards
- J. Robbins – producer (recording and mixing)
