= Volume III (Kamchatka album) =

Studio album by Kamchatka
- Released: March 4, 2009
- Recorded: Shrimpmonkey studios Vbg, Sweden
- Genres: Hard rock Blues-rock; Stoner rock
- Length: 58:50
- Label: Superpuma Records
- Producer: Kamchatka

Kamchatka chronology
| Volume II (2007) | Volume III (2009) | Bury Your Roots (2011) |

Volume III is the third album of Kamchatka, an eleven track effort, containing the cover version "Whipping Post", originally recorded by The Allman Brothers Band. The album was produced by Kamchatka, recorded and mixed by Tobias Strandvik and Kamchatka at Shrimpmonkey Studios, and mastered by Johan Eckerblad at Mintelligence Studios.

== Track listing ==
1. "681" (Andersson)
2. "Pathetic" (Öjersson)
3. "Astrobucks" (Öjersson, Andersson)
4. "Look Over Your Shoulder" (Andersson, Öjersson)
5. "See" (Andersson)
6. "Wood" (Öjersson)
7. "Sorg" (Öjersson)
8. "Confessions" (Andersson)
9. "Outnumbered" (Öjersson)
10. "Guess I'll Be Leaving" (Öjersson)
11. "Whipping Post" (Gregg Allman)

== Credits ==
=== Band ===
- Thomas "Juneor" Andersson - guitar & lead vocals
- Roger Öjersson - bass & lead vocals
- Tobias Strandvik - drums

=== Guest appearances ===
- Jean-Paul Gaster - drums on "Whipping Post"
- Per Wiberg - keyboards on "Look Over You Shoulder", "See", "Sorg", and "Guess I'll Be Leaving"

=== Personnel ===
- Johan Eckerblad - mastering
- Chris Green - band photo
- Hippograffix - cover art layout & design (also Armageddon - Three amongst others)
