= Semyon Yanovsky =

Russian naval officer (1789–1876)

3rd Governor of Russian America
- In office October 24, 1818 – September 15, 1820
- Preceded by: Ludwig von Hagemeister
- Succeeded by: Matvey Muravyev

Personal details
- Born: April 15, 1789 Glukhov, Chernigov Governorate, Russian Empire
- Died: January 6, 1876 (aged 86) Kaluga Governorate, Russian Empire
- Spouse: Irina Baranova

Semyon Ivanovich Yanovsky (Russian: Семён Иванович Яновский; April 15, 1789 – January 6, 1876) was a Russian naval officer who was appointed in late 1818 as Chief Manager of the Russian-American Company, serving into 1820. He had traveled to Kodiak Island with his commanding officer, Ludwig von Hagemeister, who appointed him to the post. The Russian-American Company conducted trading and colonization based in present-day Alaska. Yanovsky was replaced in 1820 by Matvey Ivanovich Muravyev, who had been selected by the Board of the RAC.

Weeks after the naval party reached Kodiak Island in 1817, Yanovsky married Irina Baranova, daughter of Alexander Andreyevich Baranov, the Chief Manager of the RAC since 1799. She was half-Aleut.

== Career ==
Yanovsky, a member of the aristocracy, attended the St. Petersburg Naval Institute to train as an officer. After graduating, he was recruited to the service of the Russian-American Company (RAC) in 1816, which drew from the navy for its leaders. He acted as second-in-command to Ludwig von Hagemeister, a Baltic German.

Hagemeister was assigned in 1817 by the Board of the RAC to investigate the finances of the Russian-American Company in New Archangel, and deputized to appoint a replacement Chief Manager if he believed it necessary. Chief Manager Alexander Andreyevich Baranov had been serving since 1799. Hagemeister and Yanovsky reached the settlement in late 1817, in present-day Alaska.

Soon after being stationed there, Semyon began a romance with Irina Baranova, the mixed-race, half-Aleut daughter of the Chief Manager. Baranov had had three children with his Aleut mistress, whom he had married in 1807 after learning that his wife had died that year in Russia. Yanovsky and Irina married six weeks after they met.

At the age of 70, Baranov was replaced in early 1818 by Hagemeister, who had been directed to review his financial accounting for the Company and appoint a successor. Baranov had been seeking to return to Russia for years. From 1818 on, all Chief Managers were drawn from officers of the Imperial Russian Navy. Hagemeister appointed Yanovsky as Chief Manager in late 1818. The senior Hagemeister and Baranov departed together to return to St. Petersburg by a sea route around the coast of Africa. During their lengthy trip, Baranov became ill and died in April 1819, and was buried at sea.

Yanovsky served as Chief Manager of the RAC from 1818 to 1820, when his official replacement arrived. Like his predecessors, Yanovsky continually requested the company to recruit doctors for work in Russian America; the first arrived in 1820. The Russian Orthodox priest known as Herman of Alaska influenced Yanovsky. Despite the naval officer saying he "was a liberal thinker tinged with anticlericalism", after his return to Russia, he later became a monk himself. He also wrote a biography of Herman. Herman was eventually canonized as an Orthodox saint, known for his service to the Alaskan Natives and Aleut.

In 1819 Yanovsky ordered an expedition to be sent to the Copper River. After receiving the officer's reports after return, he concluded copper mining operations on the river would be too expensive. Informing his superiors of the many costs that would be incurred from such ventures, Yanovsky persuaded the company against pursuing immediate explorations in the area.

Yanovsky's replacement, Matvey Ivanovich Muravyev, arrived in 1820, having been appointed as Chief Manager. Travel to the island from St. Petersburg took a year.

Government offices
Preceded by Ludwig von Hagemeister	Governor of Russian Colonies in America; 1818—1820	Succeeded by Matvey Ivanovich Muravyev
