= Kamchatka (band) =

Swedish rock band

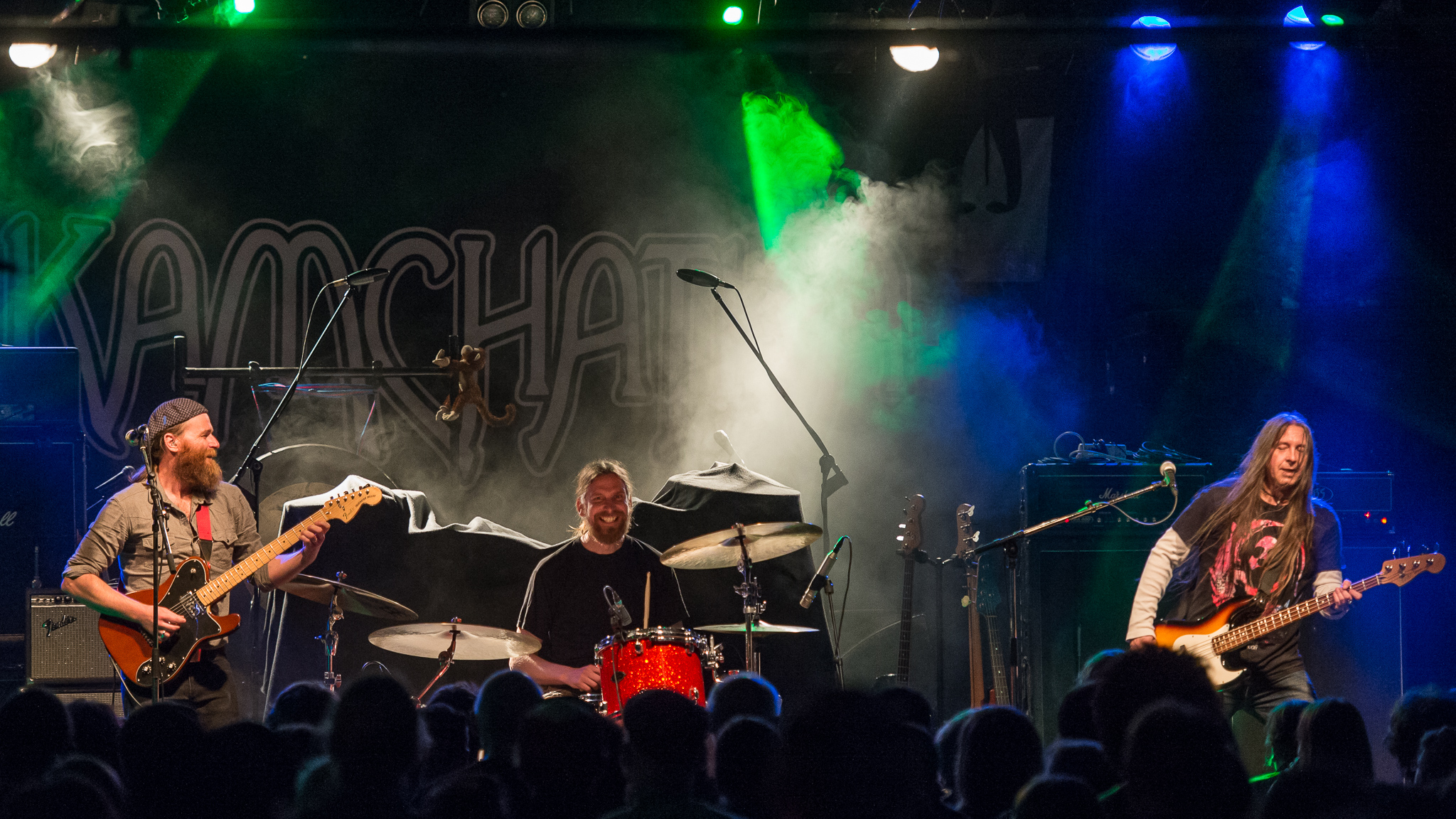
- Kamchatka performing in 2016

Background information
- Origin: Varberg, Sweden
- Genres: Hard rock, blues rock, stoner rock
- Years active: 2001–2024 (on hiatus)
- Labels: GMR
- Members: Thomas "Juneor" Andersson; Tobias Strandvik; Per Wiberg
- Past members: Roger Öjersson; Linus Carlsson
- Website: kamchatka.se

Kamchatka are a Swedish rock band highly influenced by late 1960s and early 1970s blues rock bands. Their sound combines elements of blues rock, stoner rock and psychedelic rock.

Kamchatka took their name from the volcanically active Russian Kamchatka Peninsula that divides the Okhotsk and the Bering Sea.

== Biography ==
In 2005 Kamchatka released their self-titled debut Kamchatka, a 14-track album containing 3 covers: "I Love Everybody" originally written by blues-rocker Johnny Winter. The 2 other songs, "Auto Mowdown" and "Spacegirl Blues" were written by Gerald V. Casale of new wave band Devo (from compilation Hardcore Devo: Volume One). The album was recorded at Shrimpmonkey studios by Nicolas Elgstrand.

In 2007, Before Kamchatka's second album Volume II was released, guitarist Thomas Andersson collaborated on a project called King Hobo with Opeth keyboardist Per Wiberg and Clutch drummer Jean-Paul Gaster, amongst others.

Kamchatka's third album Volume III was released in March 2009. An 11-track album containing a cover of The Allman Brothers' song Whipping Post featuring Clutch drummer Jean Paul Gaster.

The fourth album Bury Your Roots, an album of 12 original tracks, was released on GMR 5 September 2011.

The fifth Kamchatka album The Search Goes On, was released on Despotz Records on 21 February 2014.

== Musical style and influences ==
Kamchatka have been influenced by several genres including blues, progressive rock, stoner rock and jazz and by artists such as Devo, Ali Farka Touré, Cactus, King Crimson, Kyuss, Sarah Vaughan and Chet Baker.

Thomas Andersson's guitar playing is mainly riff based and is considered highly inspired by Jimi Hendrix and Robin Trower, therefore Kamchatka are often compared to heavy blues-rock bands active in the late 1960s and early 1970s like The Jimi Hendrix Experience, Led Zeppelin and Cream. The band has been labeled hard rock, stoner rock, jam band, power trio and blues-rock.

== Touring ==
In early 2007, Kamchatka did a tour in Sweden opening for blues influenced band Clutch on three occasions. In April/May 2008 Kamchatka did a US Tour opening for Clutch on 21 occasions. In 2009, they continued this affiliation with Clutch by joining them on a November tour of the EU.

== Members ==
Current Members

- Thomas "Juneor" Andersson – guitar, vocals (2001–present)
- Tobias Strandvik – drums (2001–present)
- Per Wiberg – bass, vocals, keyboards (2015–present)

Past Members

- Roger Ojersson – bass, vocals (2001–2015)
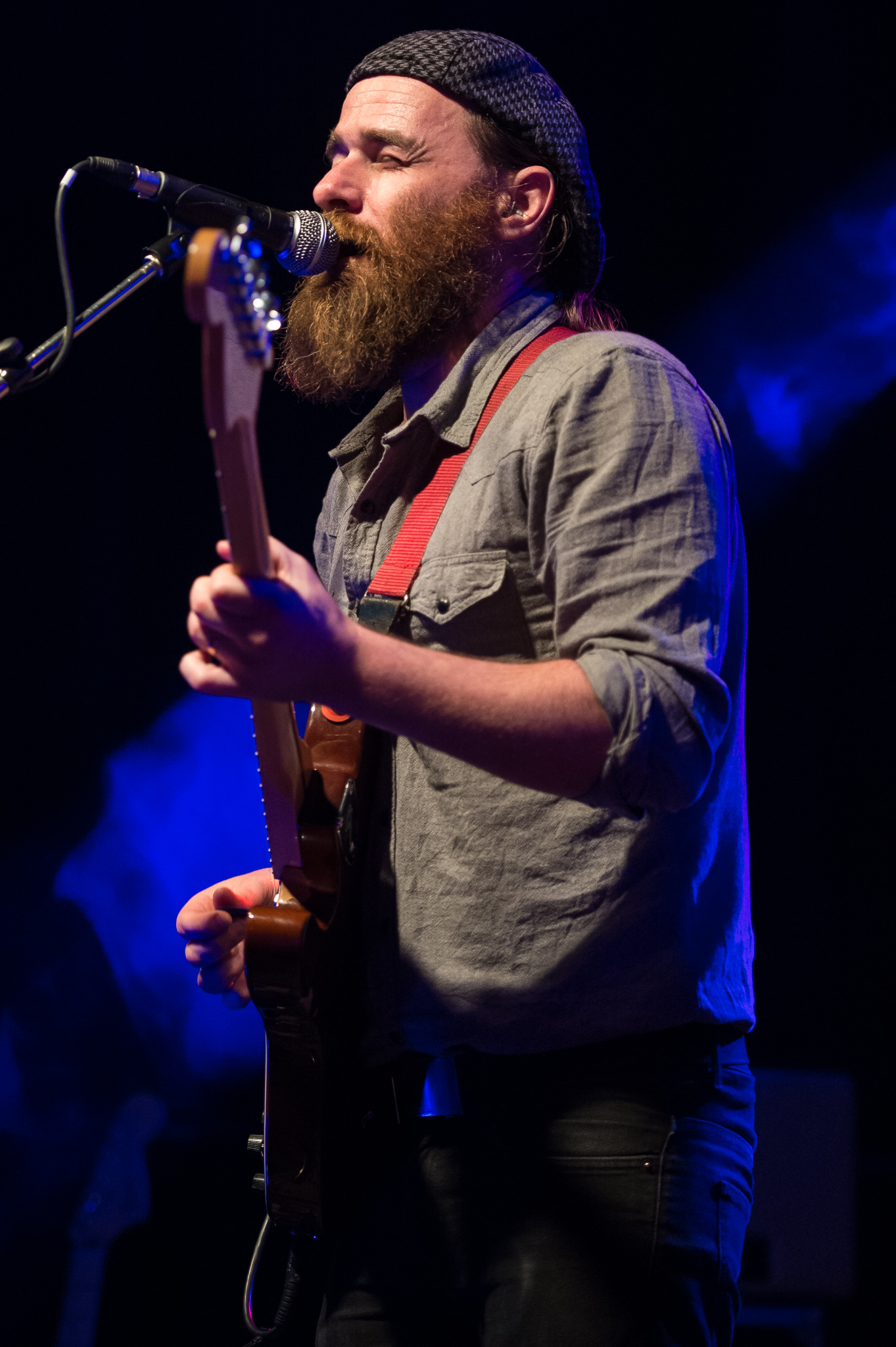
Thomas "Juneor" Andersson

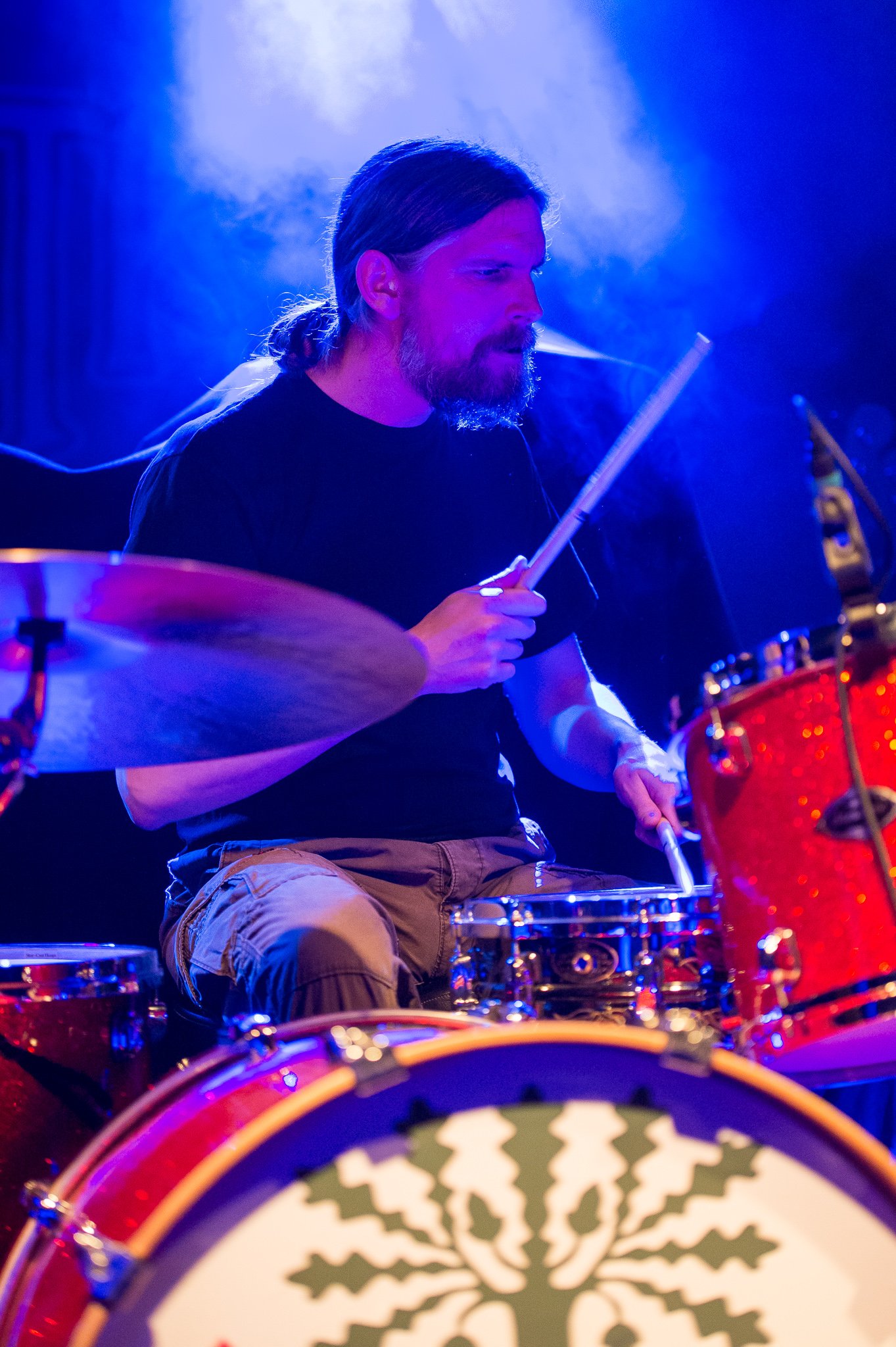
Tobias Strandvik

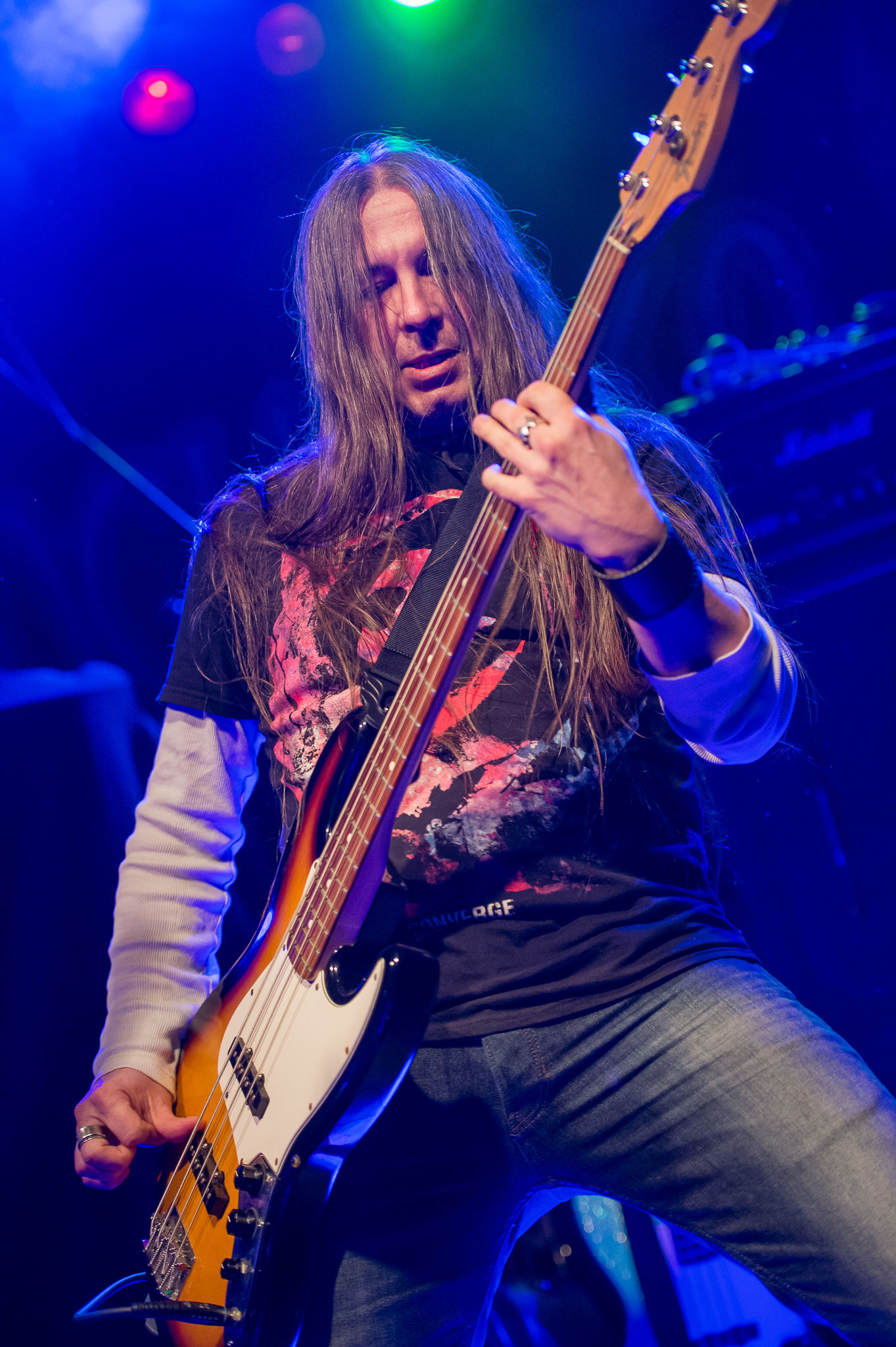
Per Wiberg

== Discography ==
=== Studio albums ===
- Kamchatka (2005)
- Volume II (2007)
- Volume III (2009)
- Bury Your Roots (2011)
- The Search Goes On (2014)
- Long Road Made of Gold (2015)
- Hoodoo Lightning (2019)

=== Singles ===
- "Tango Decadence" (2013)
- "Doorknocker Blues" (2014)
- "Somedays" (2014)
- "Ain't Fallin'" (2014)
- "Get Your Game On" (2015)
- "To You" (2015)
- "Human Dynamo" (2015)
- "Devil Dance" (2016)
- "No One That Can Tell" (2016)
- "Stone Cold Shaky Bones" (2018)
- "Rainbow Bridge" (2019)
- "Fool" (2019)
