= Demons (Spiritual Beggars album) =

Studio album by Spiritual Beggars
- Released: 20 June 2005
- Recorded: July 2004 – 18 April 2005
- Genre: Stoner metal
- Length: 49:20
- Label: Toy's Factory

Spiritual Beggars chronology
On Fire (2002)	Demons (2005)	Return To Zero (2010)

Deluxe Version Cover
- Cover of 2CD version

Demons is the sixth studio album by the Swedish stoner metal band Spiritual Beggars.

It was first released in Japan on 23 March 2005 as a deluxe 2 two cd digipak which includes a bonus live CD with material recorded at the Shibuya Ax in Tokyo, Japan on 18 April 2003. Released shortly after the 2 disc version sold out was a single disc jewel case version with same artwork as the digipak.

Demons was finally released in Europe on 20 June 2005. Also in two versions – a single CD version with the original artwork and the two CD version but with different artwork.

== Track listing ==
All music by Michael Amott, all lyrics by Michael Amott except "No One Heard" by Janne "JB" Christoffersson, and "Not Fragile" by C. Fred Turner.

Disc one

No.	Title	Length
1.	"Inner Strength (Intro)"	1:19
2.	"Throwing Your Life Away"	3:32
3.	"Salt in Your Wounds"	3:19
4.	"One Man Army"	3:57
5.	"Through the Halls"	5:08
6.	"Treading Water"	3:33
7.	"Dying Every Day"	5:45
8.	"Born to Die"	4:34
9.	"Born to Die (Reprise)"	1:21
10.	"In My Blood"	4:13
11.	"Elusive"	3:33
12.	"Sleeping with One Eye Open"	3:44
13.	"No One Heard"	5:02

Disc two (Live in Japan)

No.	Title	Length
1.	"Monster Astronauts"	3:55
2.	"Angel of Betrayal"	4:14
3.	"Young Man, Old Soul"	3:21
4.	"Wonderful World"	4:21
5.	"Blind Mountain"	4:17
6.	"Guitar Solo"	2:04
7.	"Look Back"	5:14
8.	"Not Fragile (Jam)"	4:07
Total length:		31:33
