= Ludwig von Hagemeister =

Russian naval officer and explorer (1780–1834)

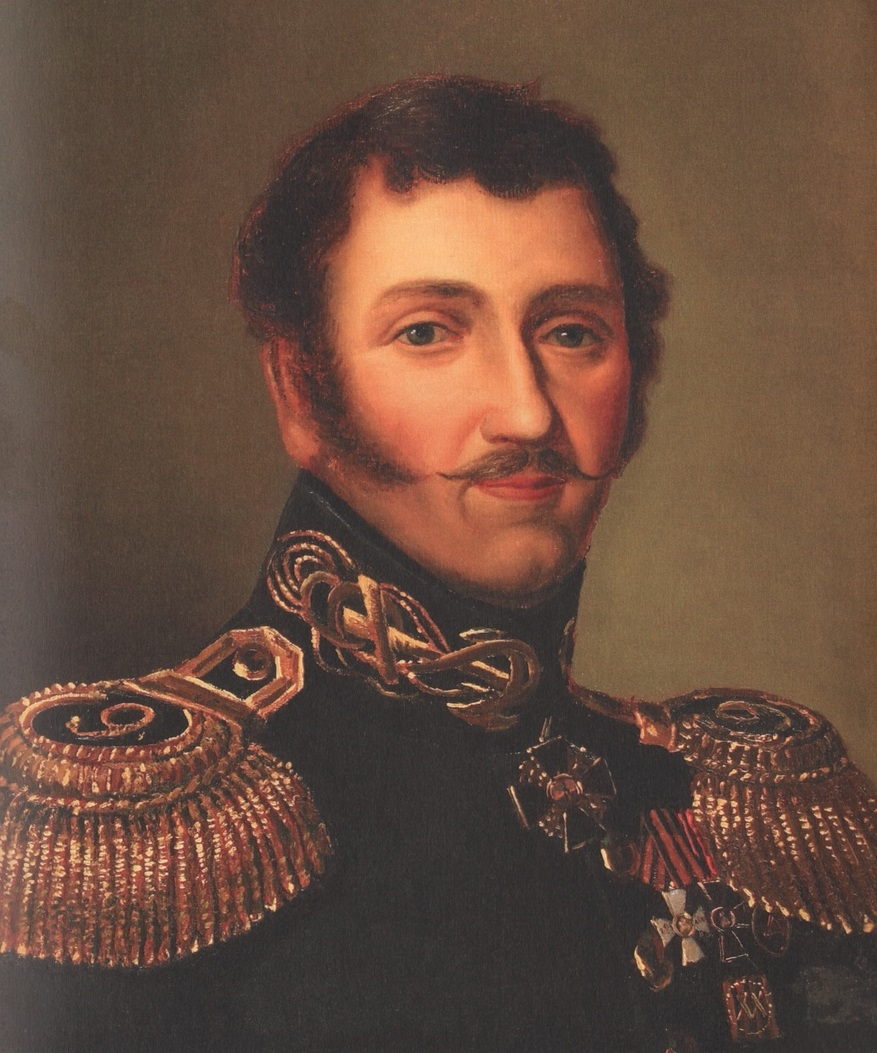

2nd Chief Manager of the Russian-American Company
- In office 11 January 1818 – 24 October 1818
- Preceded by: Alexander Andreyevich Baranov
- Succeeded by: Semyon Yanovsky

Personal details
- Born: 16 June [O.S. 5 June] 1780 Drostenhof, Governorate of Livonia, Russian Empire
- Died: 3 January 1834 [O.S. 22 December 1833] (aged 53) Saint Petersburg, Russian Empire

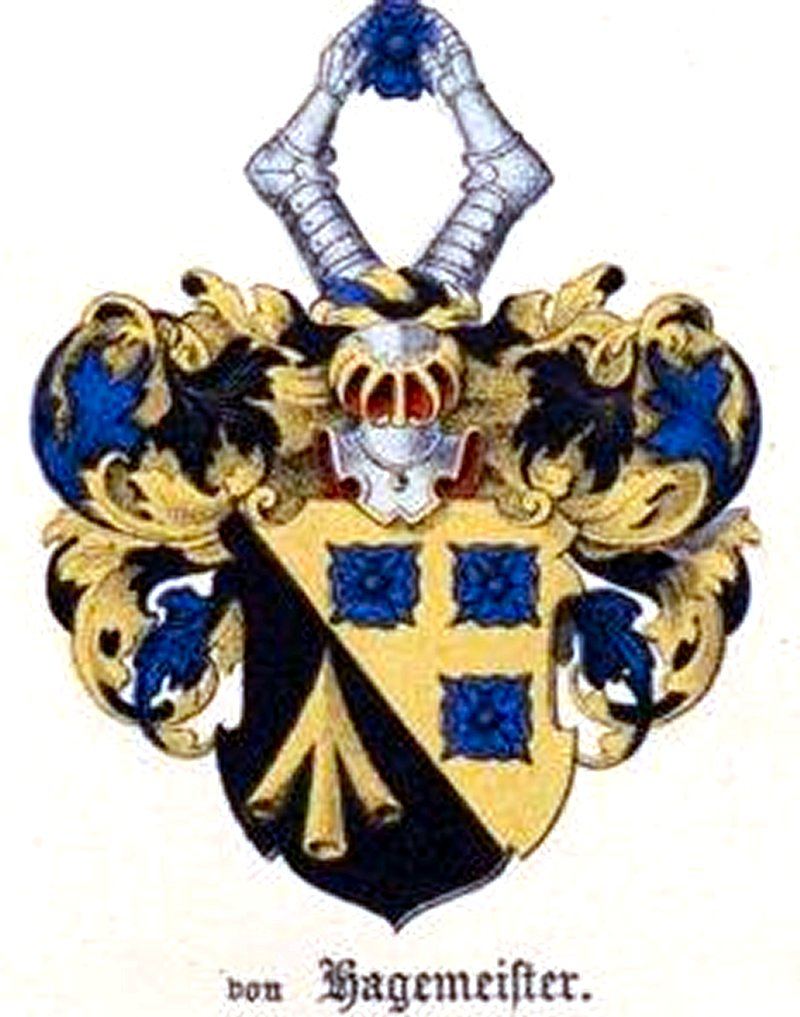
Coat of arms of the Hagemeister family of 1692, in the Baltic Coat of arms book by Carl Arvid von Klingspor in 1882.

Ludwig Karl August von Hagemeister (Russian: Лео́нтий Андриа́нович Гагеме́йстер, romanized: Leontiy Andrianovich Gagemeyster; 16 June [O.S. 5 June] 1780 – 3 January 1834 [O.S. 22 December 1833]) was a Russian naval officer who held the rank of captain 1st rank in the Imperial Russian Navy. He was a maritime explorer of Alaska and the Pacific Ocean, and served briefly in 1817–1818 as the second chief manager of the Russian-American Company.

== Naval career ==
Hagemeister was born to an ethnic Baltic German family in the Russian Empire. He began his service in the Russian naval forces in 1795 as a volunteer midshipman. Along with a group of fellow junior servicemen, he joined the British Royal Navy in 1802 on board HMS Argus.

In 1806 he was directed to take Neva with provisions needed to Russian America; this was the first of three circumnavigations in his career to New Archangel. Departing on 20 October 1806 from Kronstadt, Neva began to cross the Atlantic Ocean to the south, to go around the continent of Africa and sail East. After passing the Cape of Good Hope, Hagemeister and his subordinates were the first Russian crew to visit the Australian mainland, reaching the port of Port Jackson on 4 June.

Reaching New Archangel (now Sitka, Alaska) on 13 September, Hagemeister was stationed on Kodiak Island for most of 1808. The Russian forces were at war with the Tlingit. He was ordered by Chief Manager of the Russian American Company (RAC), Aleksandr Baranov, to secure needed provisions from the Kingdom of Hawaii on 30 November 1808 and perhaps find a suitable location for a Russian colony there. Hagemeister explored portions of the North Pacific and met with King Kamehameha I in early 1809. Amicable conversations were commenced with the monarch and Hagemeister purchased a cargo of salt. Delivering the salt to New Archangel, he later departed for Saint Petersburg in 1810 on Neva.

Hagemeister reached Petropavlovsk-Kamchatsky on 28 May and began the overland trek through Siberia. His circumnavigation was recognized by Russian authorities at St. Petersburg, as he was promoted to captain lieutenant and awarded the Order of St. Vladimir 4th class. He served as chairman of the Admiralty of Irkutsk from 1812 to 1815, in which capacity Hagemeister was responsible for building the first ships to cross Lake Baikal.

Vasily Golovnin encouraged him to plan another journey to New Archangel, and worked for his appointment to an RAC ship. Besides delivering more needed provisions, Hagemeister was ordered to investigate Baranov's financial management of the company and deputed to replace him as Chief Manager if he felt it necessary. Baranov, then 70, had requested relief from his position for years in order to return to Russia. Commanding the Kutuzov, Hagemeister started his second circumnavigation in 1816. Hagemeister arrived at New Archangel during 1817, with his second-in-command, Semyon Yanovsky.

Before examining Baranov's financial records, Hagemeister traveled to northern California to formalize relations with the Kashia Pomo people. He was the principal negotiator with leaders of the local Pomo band, and obtained the privilege to establish Fort Ross. The parties signed a treaty on 22 September 1817, with tribal officials reported to have said that "They are very pleased to see Russians occupy this land, for they now live in safety from other Indians who used to attack them from time to time. This security began only from the time of Russian settlement." The agreement was made by RAC officials as a part of a scheme to take over Alta California from the Spanish Empire.

Returning to New Archangel, Hagemeister and other naval officers spent the winter examining the financial records of the RAC. Sources disagree on what was found: Khlebnikov says that the records showed no evidence of malfeasance. Borneman says that they found a discrepancy in the amount of supplies listed in accounting records. On 11 January 1818 Baranov was, "in a most arrogant way", removed by Hagemeister from office.

Hagemeister took over, changing the methods of payment to the promyshlenniki workers, by giving currency for salaries and abandoning the share system in favor of provisions. He worked to improve relations with the Hawaiian Kingdom, as they had been damaged from the Schäffer affair. Hagemeister outlawed trade by non-RAC Europeans, a policy later adopted by the Russian government. This policy was contained in the Ukase of 1821, a decree from the Imperial Government that extended Russian land claims to northern California and banned all non-Russian European merchants from the area.

Hagemeister appointed his direct second-in-command, Semyon Ivanovich Yanovsky, as the next Chief Manager. In late October 1818, Hagemeister and Baranov departed from New Archangel; the latter was pleased to be at last returning to Russia. But Baranov died in 1819, while they were still at sea, and was buried at sea. In 1820 Yanovsky was replaced by another naval officer, chosen directly by the Board of the RAC.

In 1828–1829, Hagemeister made his final circumnavigation on the ship Krotky. During this journey, he surveyed the Menshikov Atoll (Kwajalein) in the Marshall Islands, plotting it on the map and specifying the location of some other islands. His diaries are composed in several European languages, including German, Russian, French, Portuguese, English and Spanish.

== Honors and legacy ==
- Hagemeister Island and Hagemeister Strait in Alaska were named for him.

== See also ==
- List of Baltic German explorers

== Sources ==
- "Гагемейстер, Леонтий Андреевич" . Brockhaus and Efron Encyclopedic Dictionary (in Russian). 1906.

Government offices
Preceded by Alexander Andreyevich Baranov	Governor of Russian Colonies in America; 1818	Succeeded by Semyon Ivanovich Yanovsky
