= Kamchatka (album) =

Studio album by Kamchatka
- Released: 2005
- Recorded: Shrimpmonkey studios Vbg, Sweden
- Genre: Hard rock Blues-rock; Stoner rock
- Length: 59:08
- Label: Grooveyard
- Producer: Nicolas Elgstrand & Kamchatka

Kamchatka chronology
Kamchatka (2005)	Volume II (2007)

Kamchatka is the debut album by the Swedish rock band Kamchatka, a 14-track album containing 3 covers: "I Love Everybody" originally written by Johnny Winter, Auto Modown and Spacegirl Blues by Gerald V Casale. The album was recorded by Nicholas Elgstrand and Kamchatka, mixed by Nicholas Elgstrand and Kamchatka at Shrimpmonkey studios and mastered by Bullen and Kamchatka at Mega Studios.

== Track listing ==
1. "Out Of My Way" (Andersson, Strandvik)
2. "Seed" (Öjersson, Andersson)
3. "No" (Öjersson)
4. "Mnemosyne Waltz" (Öjersson, Andersson)
5. "Mixed Emotions" (Andersson)
6. "Wrong End..." (Öjersson, Andersson, Strandvik)
7. "Eggshell" (Öjersson)
8. "I Love Everybody" (Johnny Winter)
9. "Auto Mowdown" (Gerald V Casale)
10. "Spacegirl Blues" (Gerald V Casale)
11. "Sing Along Song" (Öjersson)
12. "Incognito" (Andersson, Strandvik, Öjersson, Elgstrand)
13. "Daddy Says" (Öjersson)
14. "Squirm" (Öjersson, Andersson, Strandvik)(includes bonus track)

== Credits ==
=== Band ===
- Thomas "Juneor" Andersson - guitar & lead vocals
- Roger Öjersson - bass & lead vocals
- Tobias Strandvik - drums

=== Personnel ===
- Nicolas Elgstrand - producer
- Joe Romagnola - executive producer
- Jennelie Andersson - band photos
- Hippograffix - cover art layout & design (also Armageddon - Three amongst others)
