= Fredrik Thomander =

Swedish songwriter, bassist and producer

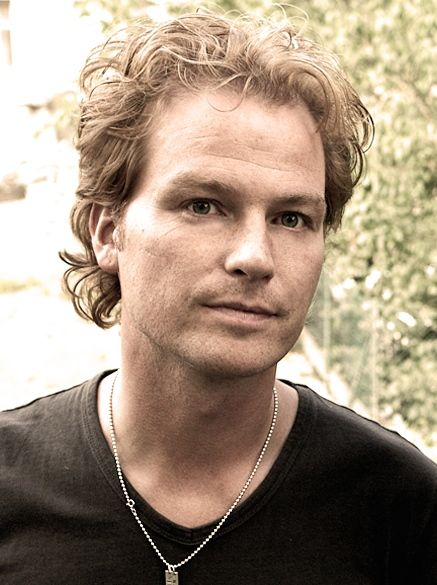

Background information
- Born: 15 March 1971 (age 54)
- Occupation(s): Songwriter, record producer
- Instrument(s): Vocals, bass

Fredrik Thomander is a Swedish songwriter, bassist and producer. For many years he performed in Swedish pop bands. He has written and produced songs, mainly of pop music, for various singers and bands, and he operates a recording studio in Mallorca.

== Early life ==
Thomander grew up in Tångaberg. As a teenager he played in a band called White Line.

== Career ==
After playing together in local bands in the 1980s, Thomander and writer Anders Wilkström continued to write songs, sometimes under the name Epicenter. Epicenter songwriting collaborations have included Lamont Dozier, Anne Roboff, and Robbie Nevil. Many of the pair's songs have been recorded by pop music bands, including ATC, Dream Street, A*Teens and LMNT.

Thomander recorded with Rachel Platten on her album Be Here.

Thomander sang and played bass in the band Vildsvin (Wild Boar) in the 1990s.

He is the co-composer of Leaving Home by Nicke Borg which was in the finals of the Swedish preselection to the 2011 Eurovision Song Contest and spent 9 weeks on the Swedish charts, peaking at #9 He played bass in the band Treat beginning in 2013.

In 2016 Thomander opened Palma Music Studios in Mallorca.
