= Spiritual Beggars =

Swedish stoner metal band

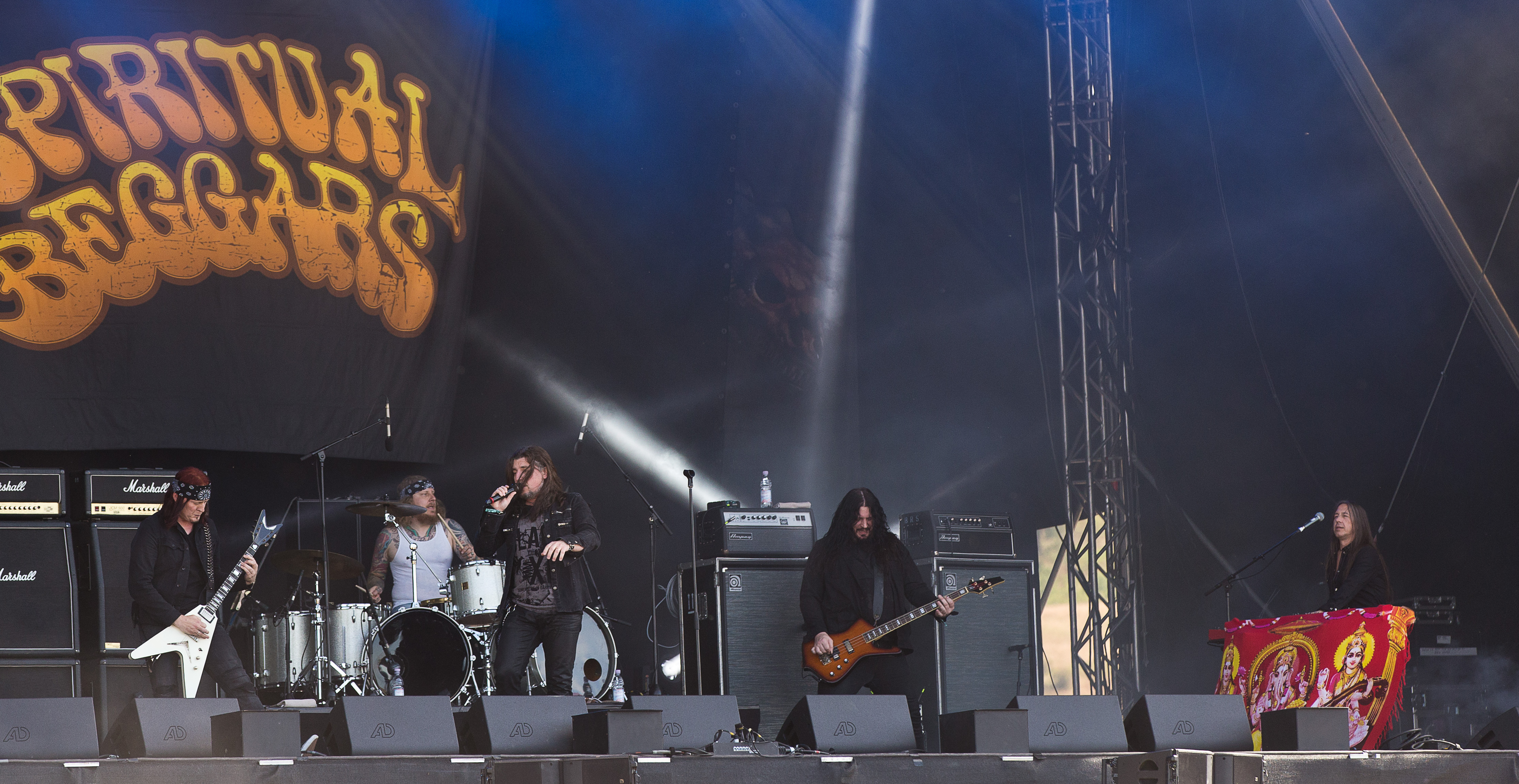
- Spiritual Beggars in 2016

Background information
- Origin: Halmstad, Sweden
- Genres: Stoner metal, hard rock
- Years active: 1994–present
- Labels: Music for Nations, Inside Out
- Members: Michael Amott; Apollo Papathanasio; Sharlee D'Angelo; Per Wiberg; Ludwig Witt
- Past members: Christian "Spice" Sjöstrand; Roger Nilsson; Janne "JB" Christoffersson
- Website: spiritualbeggars.com

Spiritual Beggars is a Swedish stoner metal band from Halmstad, formed by Michael Amott, who is known for his work with Arch Enemy, Carcass and Carnage. The band is heavily influenced by 1970s hard rock and incorporates elements of psychedelia into its music.

== History ==
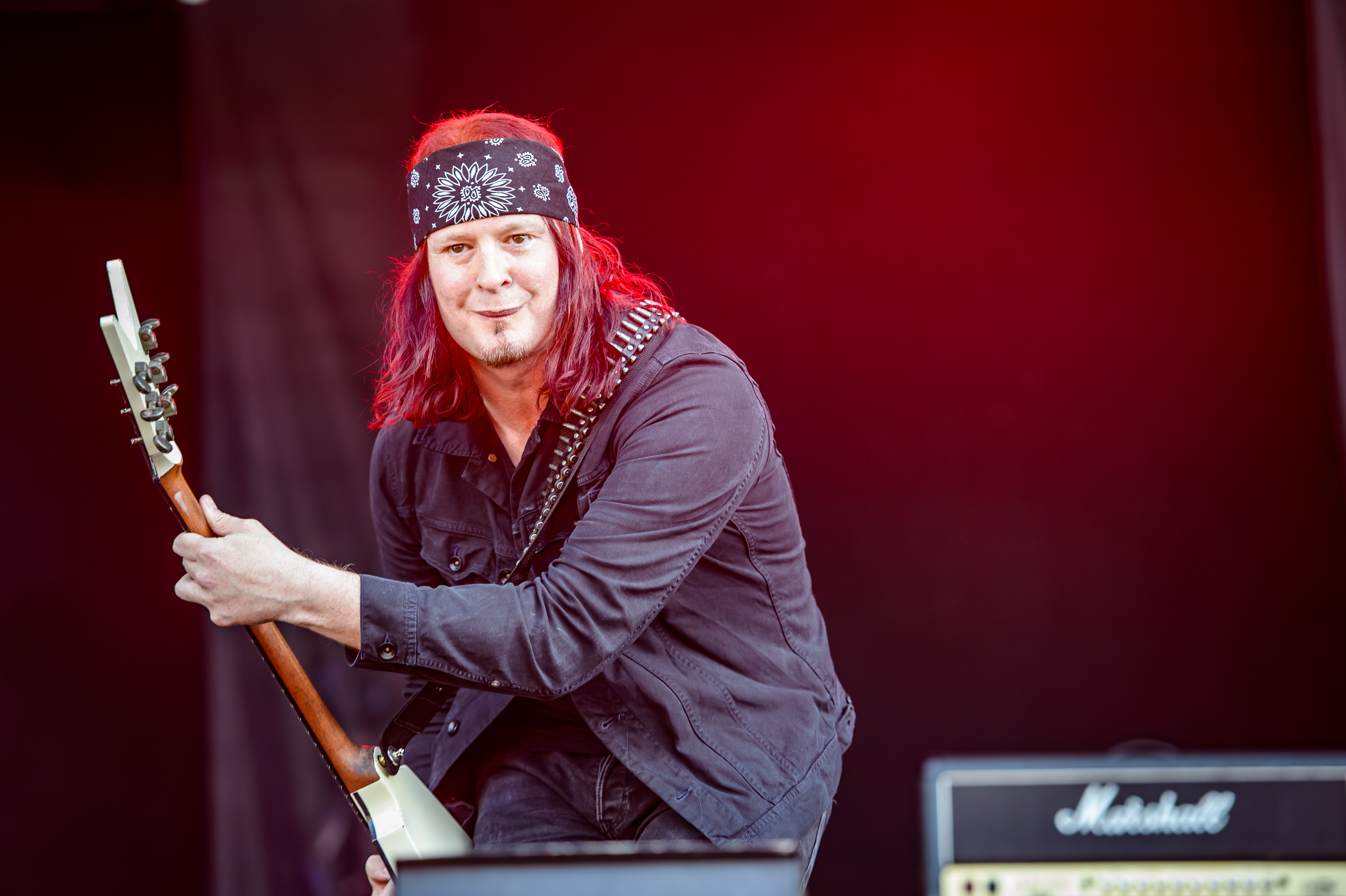
Guitarist Michael Amott at the Rockharz 2016

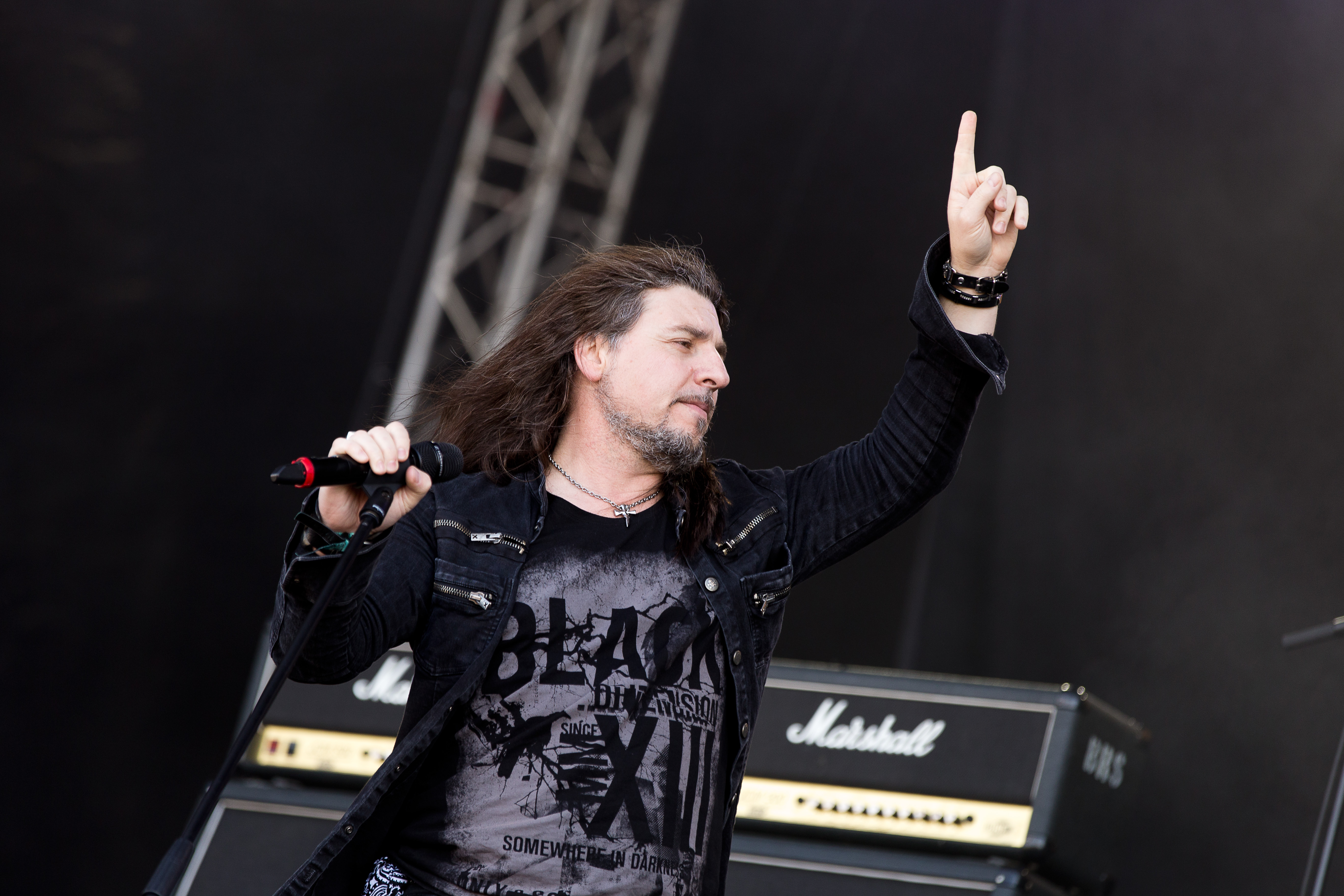
Singer Apollo Papathanasio at the Rockharz 2016

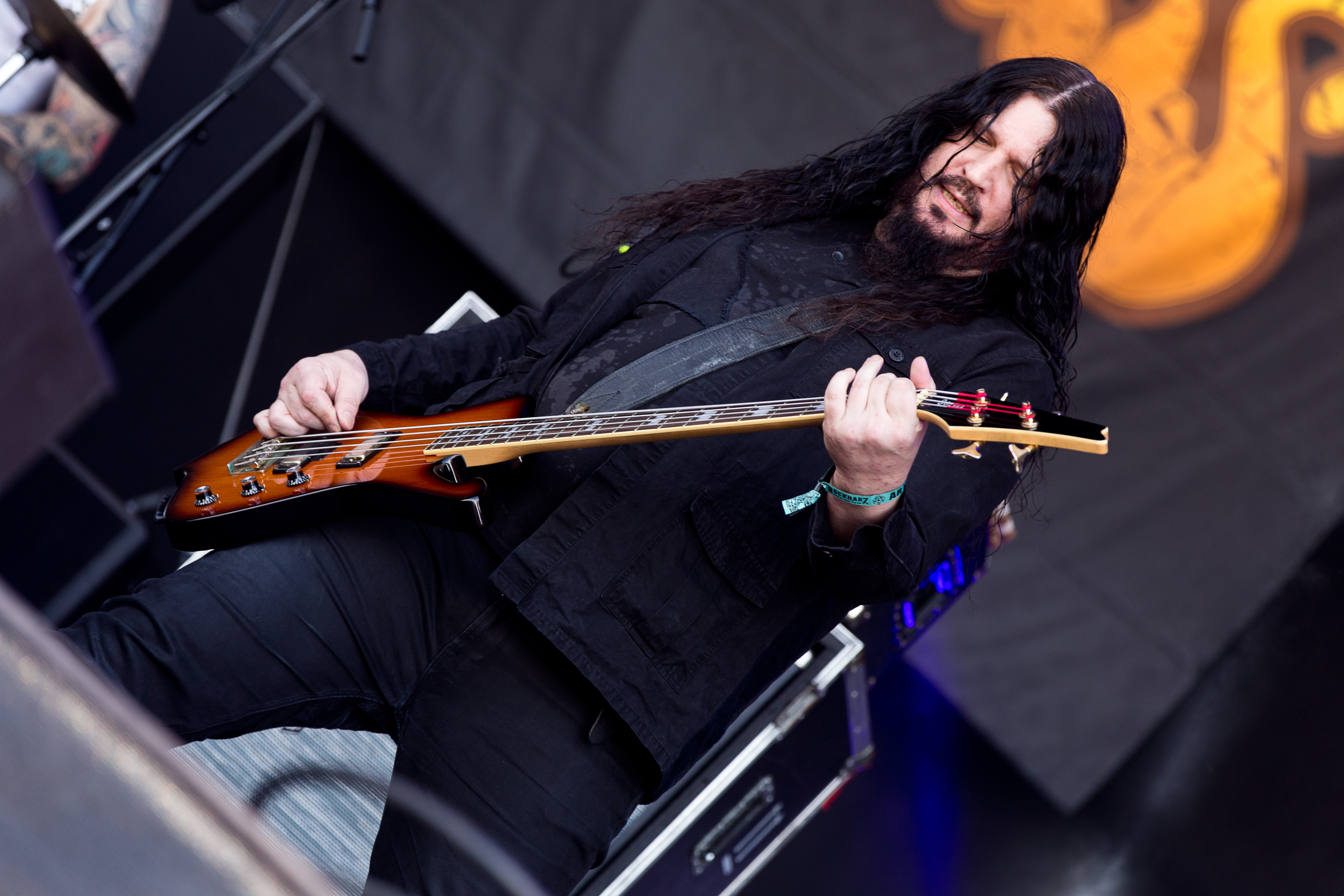
Bassist Sharlee D'Angelo at the Rockharz 2016

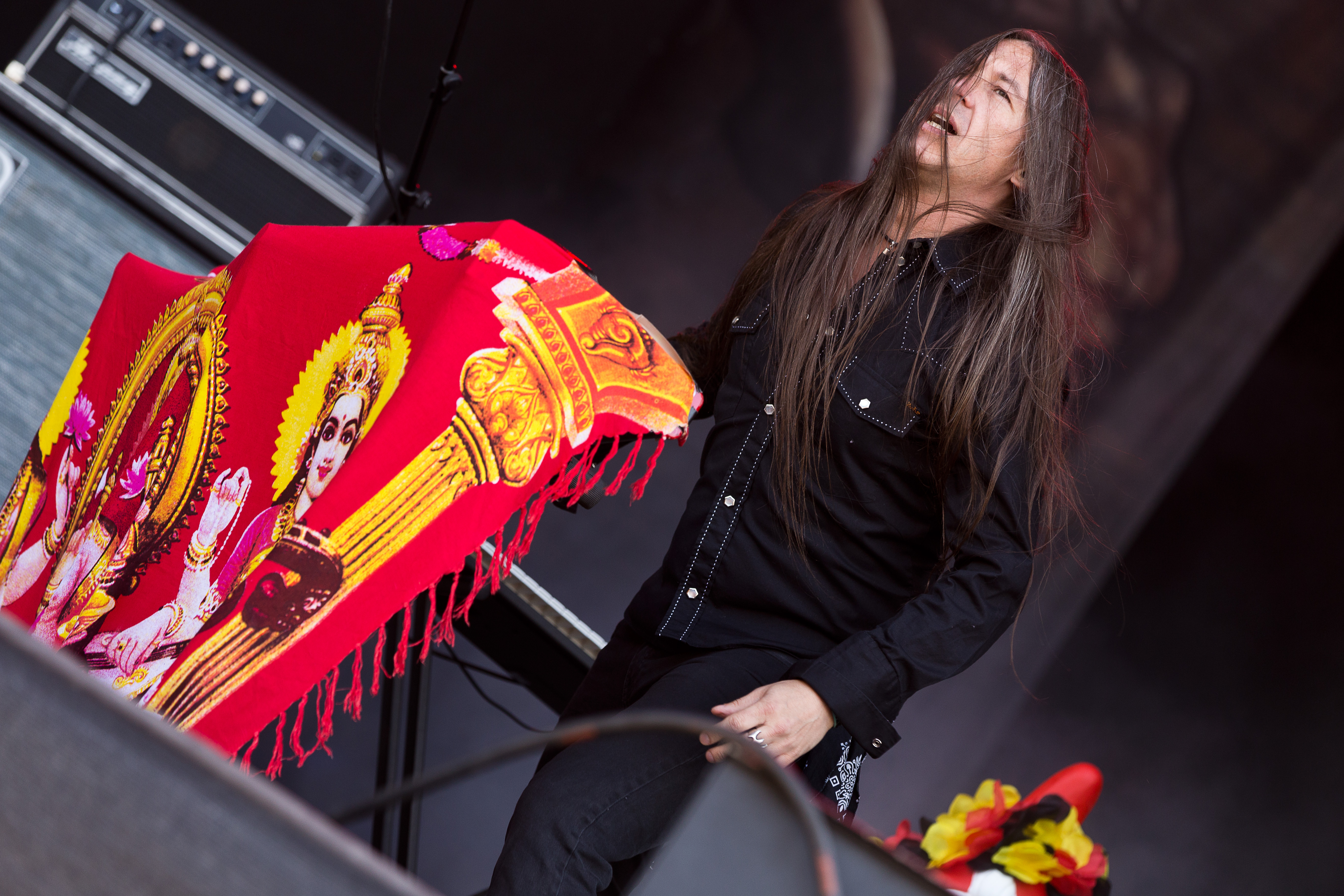
Keyboardist Per Wiberg at the Rockharz 2016

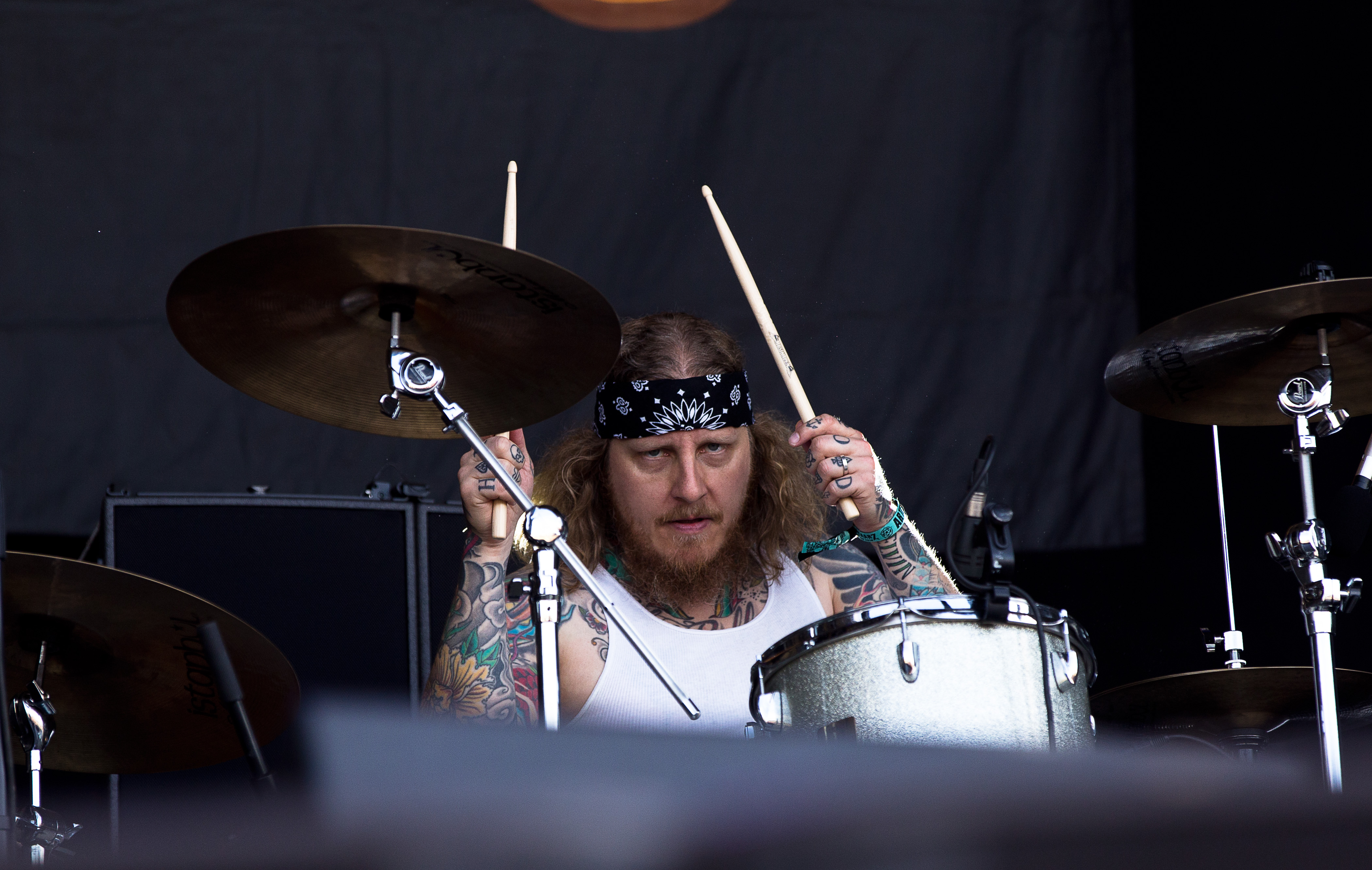
Drummer Ludwig Witt at the Rockharz 2016

=== Spice era ===
Spiritual Beggars was formed in 1993 by Michael Amott. Amott started the band after he left Carcass. Spiritual Beggars debuted with the self-titled Spiritual Beggars in 1994 and have subsequently released albums as Michael's schedule, which also includes being a full-time member of Arch Enemy, permits.

The second album, Another Way to Shine (1996) was nominated for a Swedish Grammy. The album featured artwork by the legendary artist Hans Arnold, depicting the members of the band in a fairytale world.

The third album, Mantra III, saw the band adding Per Wiberg on keyboards. Spiritual Beggars toured Europe with Fu Manchu and made several festival appearances in support of the album.

The fourth album, Ad Astra, was released in 2000 and enjoyed strong sales across Europe and in Japan. The band toured heavily on their Chasing The Stars tour that followed, supporting bands such as Iron Maiden, Monster Magnet, and Queens of the Stone Age, as well as playing festivals and headlining shows in Europe and Japan.

=== JB era ===
2002 saw the release of the band's fifth studio recording, On Fire. This album featured a new line-up following the departure of original singer Christian "Spice" Sjöstrand. The replacements were Janne "JB" Christoffersson of Grand Magus, who had been recommended to Amott by a mutual friend, while Roger Nilsson joined to handle the bass.

On Fire album was musically and vocally more melodic and saw the band delving deeper into 1970s hard rock for inspiration. A 2003 European tour featured Spiritual Beggars alongside Clutch, Spiritu and Dozer was completed in support of the album, which was followed by a tour of Japan with Clutch as the opening act.

Spiritual Beggars' sixth album, Demons, was released in Japan in March 2005 and in Europe on 20 June 2005. Demons was released in two versions – a single CD version and a two-CD version, which includes live material recorded in Japan during 2003. The touring on this record was limited to a three-date Japanese tour with Dio and a headline performance in London.

=== Apollo era ===
In early March 2010, it was announced that Spiritual Beggars had entered the studio to record their first studio album in five years. The album featured new singer Apollo Papathanasio of Firewind and Evil Masquerade. This album, Return to Zero, was released in Europe on 30 August 2010, in Japan on 25 August 2010 and in North America on 12 October 2010. Following the release the band played shows in Greece, Japan, Belgium, France and Finland.

Their performance at Loud Park Festival in Japan on 17 October 2010 was recorded and released as the Return to Live: Loud Park 2010.

Apollo's second album with Spiritual Beggars, Earth Blues, was released on 15 April 2013. The album has been noted for drawing influence from Deep Purple.

== Members ==
- Michael Amott – guitars (1992–present)
- Ludwig Witt – drums (1992–present)
- Per Wiberg – keyboards, vocals (1998–present)
- Sharlee D'Angelo – bass (2004–present)
- Apollo Papathanasio – vocals (2010–present)

=== Former members ===
- Christian "Spice" Sjöstrand – vocals, bass (1992–2001)
- Janne "JB" Christoffersson – vocals (2002–2010)
- Roger Nilsson – bass (2002–2004)

=== Touring/session members ===
- Stefan Isebring – percussion, hurdy-gurdy (1998, also appeared on Mantra III)

== Discography ==
=== Albums ===
- Spiritual Beggars (1994)
- Another Way to Shine (1996)
- Mantra III (1998)
- Ad Astra (2000)
- On Fire (2002)
- Demons (2005)
- Return to Zero (2010)
- Earth Blues (2013)
- Sunrise to Sundown (2016)

=== Singles/EPs ===
- "Violet Karma" 10-inch (Purple Vinyl) (1998, Froghouse Records)
- "It's Over" split 7-inch with Grand Magus (2001, Southern Lord Records)

=== Live ===
- Live Fire! DVD (2005, SPV)
- Return to Live: Loud Park 2010 (2011, Trooper Entertainment)

=== Compilation appearances ===
- "Magic Spell" on Stahlmaster: Volume One (1996, Cream/Rough Trade Records)
- "Monster Astronauts" on Burn One Up (1997, Attic Records Limited/Roadrunner Records)
- "Redwood Blues" on Stoned Revolution: The Ultimate Trip (1998, Drunken Maria Records/Rough Trade Records)
- "Mr. White" on Bastards Will Pay: A Tribute to Trouble (1999, Freedoom Records)
