= Epitaph Records discography =

This is the discography of Epitaph Records. The list is ordered by release number. Original release dates are within the parentheses.

== Releases ==
Cat. #	Artist	Title	Year	Format	Other information
EPI-BREP1	Bad Religion	Bad Religion (EP)	1981	7″	First official Epitaph release.
EPI-BREP2	Bad Religion	Back to the Known (EP)	1985	12″	
EPI-BRLP1	Bad Religion	How Could Hell Be Any Worse?	1982	LP	
EPI-BRLP2	Bad Religion	Into the Unknown	1983	LP	
EPI-SEG 1	The Seeing Eye Gods	The Seeing Eye Gods (EP)	1985	12"	The Seeing Eye Gods were a one-off psychedelic pop project created by former Bad Religion guitarist Brett Gurewitz (appearing as Billy Pilgrim) and his friend, Jon Bertini (appearing at Ripped Van Winkle). The duo released a single-sided, 5 song 12" EP on Gurewitz's Epitaph label in 1985.
E-86400	The Things	Things	1988	LP	
E-86401	L7	L7	1988	LP, CD	
E-86402	various artists	More Songs About Anger, Fear, Sex & Death	1992	CD	
E-86403	Little Kings	Head First	1989	LP, CD	
E-86404	Bad Religion	Suffer	1988	LP, CD	
E-86405	NOFX	S&M Airlines	1989	LP, CD	
E-86406	Bad Religion	No Control	1989	LP, CD	
E-86407	Bad Religion	80–85	1991	CD	
E-86408	Insted	What We Believe	1990	LP, CD	
E-86409	Bad Religion	Against the Grain	1990	LP, CD	
E-86410	NOFX	Ribbed	1991	LP, CD	
E-86411	Down by Law	Down by Law	1991	LP, CD	
E-86412	Pennywise	Pennywise	1991	LP, CD	
E-86413	Coffin Break	Crawl	1991	LP, CD	
E-86414	Bad Religion	Along the Way	1991	VHS, DVD	Originally released on VHS in 1991; re-released on DVD in 2004.
E-86415	Dag Nasty	Four on the Floor	1992	LP, CD	
E-86416	Bad Religion	Generator	1992	LP, CD	
E-86417	NOFX	Liberal Animation	1991	LP, CD	Originally recorded in 1988, but not released until 1991.
E-86418	NOFX	White Trash, Two Heebs and a Bean	1992	LP, CD	
E-86419	Down by Law	Blue	1992	LP, CD	
E-86420	Bad Religion	Recipe for Hate	1993	LP, CD	Released only in Europe.
E-86421	Coffin Break	Thirteen	1992	LP, CD	
E-86423	Rich Kids on LSD	Reactivate	1993	LP, CD	
E-86424	The Offspring	Ignition	1992	LP, CD	Labeled as one of Epitaph's best selling albums
E-86425	Claw Hammer	Pablum	1993	LP, CD	
E-86426	Rich Kids on LSD	Rock N' Roll Nightmare	1993		
E-86427	Thelonious Monster	Baby, You're Bumming My Life in a Supreme Fashion	1986	CD	
E-86428	Rancid	Rancid	1993	LP, CD	
E-86429	Pennywise	Unknown Road	1993	LP, CD	
E-86430	SNFU	Something Green And Leafy This Way Comes	1993	LP, CD	
E-86431	Down by Law	Punkrockacademyfightsong	1994	LP, CD	
E-86432	The Offspring	Smash	1994	LP, CD	Labeled as one of Epitaph's best selling albums.
E-86433	Claw Hammer	Thank the Holder Upper	1995		
E-86434	Rancid	Let's Go	1994	LP, CD	Labeled as one of Epitaph's best selling albums.
E-86435	NOFX	Punk in Drublic	1994	LP, CD	Labeled as one of Epitaph's best selling albums.
E-86436	Ten Foot Pole	Rev	1994	LP, CD	
E-86437	Pennywise	About Time	1995	LP, CD	
E-86438	Total Chaos	Pledge of Defiance	1993	LP, CD	
E-86439	Gas Huffer	One Inch Masters	1994	LP, CD	
E-86440	Pennywise	Home Movies	1995	VHS, DVD	Originally released on VHS in 1995; re-released on DVD in 2004.
E-86441	SNFU	The One Voted Most Likely to Succeed	1995	LP, CD	
E-86442	The Humpers	Live Forever or Die Trying	1996	LP, CD	
E-86443	Bad Religion	All Ages	1995	LP, CD	
E-86444	Rancid	...And Out Come the Wolves	1995	LP, CD	Labeled as one of Epitaph's best selling albums.
E-86445	Rich Kids on LSD	Riches to Rags	1994	LP, CD	
E-86446	Red Aunts	#1 Chicken	1995	LP, CD	
E-86447	Wayne Kramer	The Hard Stuff	1995	LP, CD	
E-86448	various artists	Punk-O-Rama	1995	LP, CD	First of the Punk-O-Rama series, this release includes songs by Bad Religion, NOFX, Rancid, The Offspring, Total Chaos, Gas Huffer, RKL, Down by Law, Wayne Kramer, Ten Foot Pole, and SNFU.
E-86449	The Cramps	Flame Job	1994	LP	
E-86450	Total Chaos	Patriotic Shock	1996	LP, CD	
E-86451	The Joykiller	The Joykiller	1995	LP, CD	
E-86452	Rancid	Roots Radicals	1995	7″	Single release.
E-86453	Dead Fucking Last	Proud to Be	1995	CD	
E-86454	Voodoo Glow Skulls	Firme	1995	LP, CD	
E-86455	Rancid	Time Bomb	1995	7″	Single release.
E-86456	Down by Law	All Scratched Up!	1996	LP, CD	
E-86457	NOFX	Heavy Petting Zoo	1996	LP, CD	
E-86458	Wayne Kramer	Dangerous Madness	1996	LP, CD	
E-86459	Gas Huffer	The Inhuman Ordeal of Special Agent Gas Huffer	1996	LP, CD	
E-86460	The Offspring	The Offspring	1995	LP, CD	Originally released on vinyl in 1989, but not on CD until 1995.
E-86461	various artists	Bored Generation	1996	CD	
E-86462	T.S.O.L.	Dance with Me	1996	CD	
E-86463	Poison Idea	Feel the Darkness	1996	LP, CD	
E-86464	Rancid	Ruby Soho	1996	7″	Single release.
E-86465	Voodoo Glow Skulls	Firme	1996	CD	Spanish version
E-86466	The Joykiller	Static	1996	CD	LP, CD
E-86467	Millencolin	Life on a Plate	1996	LP, CD	
E-86468	The Joykiller	Seventeen	1996	LP, CD	Single release; released only in Europe.
E-86469	Daredevils	Hate You	1996		Single release.
E-86470	Pulley	Esteem Driven Engine	1996	LP, CD	
E-86471	Total Chaos	Anthems from the Alleyway	1996	LP, CD	
E-86472	SNFU	FYULABA	1996	LP, CD	
E-86473	Red Aunts	Saltbox	1996	LP, CD	
E-86474	various artists	Better Read Than Dead	1996	CD	
E-86475	Noam Chomsky	The Clinton Vision – Old Wine, New Bottles	1996	CD	
E-86476	Noam Chomsky	Prospects for Democracy	1996	CD	
E-86477	Noam Chomsky	Class War: The Attack on Working People	1996	CD	
E-86478	Ten Foot Pole	Unleashed	1997	LP, CD	
E-86479	New Bomb Turks	Scared Straight	1996	LP, CD	
E-86480	Ruth Ruth	The Little Death	1996	LP, CD, 10″	
E-86481	Descendents	Everything Sucks	1996	LP, CD	
E-86482	Voodoo Glow Skulls	Fat Randy	1999		Single release; released only in Europe.
E-86483	The Humpers	Plastique Valentine	1997	LP, CD	
E-86484	various artists	Punk-O-Rama Vol. 2	1996	CD	This Punk-O-Rama series release includes songs by Descendents, Pennywise, Pulley, Me First and the Gimme Gimmes, The Humpers, Rancid, Millencolin, Voodoo Glow Skulls, The Joykiller, T.S.O.L., NOFX, Down By Law, Poison Idea, Dead Fucking Last, SNFU, Bad Religion, and New Bomb Turks.
E-86485	Me First and the Gimme Gimmes	Billy	1996	7″	Single release.
E-86486	various artists	I'm Sure We're Going to Make It (Dutch Punk 1977–1982)	1996	LP, CD	Released only in Europe.
E-86487	The Offspring	Ixnay on the Hombre	1997	LP, CD	Released only in Europe.
E-86488	Wayne Kramer	Citizen Wayne	1997	LP, CD	
E-86489	Pennywise	Full Circle	1997	LP, CD	
E-86490	Descendents	I'm the One	1997		Single release; released only in Europe.
E-86491	The Offspring	All I Want	1997	CD-single	
E-86492	Voodoo Glow Skulls	Baile de Los Locos	1997	LP, CD	
E-86493	Dead Fucking Last	Grateful/Tape Show	1997	LP, CD	
E-86494	Union 13	East Los Presents	1997	LP, CD	
E-86495	The Offspring	All I Want	1997		Single release; released only in Europe.
E-86496	Helmet	Aftertaste	1997	LP	
E-86497	Rancid	Life Won't Wait	1998	LP, CD	
E-86498	The Offspring	Gone Away	1997	CD-single	
E-86501	Down by Law	Last of the Sharpshooters	1997	LP, CD	
E-86502	The Joykiller	Three	1997	LP, CD	
E-86503	Millencolin	For Monkeys	1997	LP, CD	
E-86504	The Offspring	Gone Away	1997	7″	Single release; released only in Europe.
E-86505	H_{2}O	Thicker Than Water	1997	LP, CD	
E-86506	Descendents	When I Get Old	1997		Single release; released only in Europe.
E-86507	Millencolin	Lozin' Must	1997	Single release.	
E-86510	The Bouncing Souls	The Bouncing Souls	1997	LP, CD	
E-86511	Gas Huffer	Just Beautiful Music	1998	LP, CD	
E-86512	The Dwarves	...Are Young And Good Looking	1997	LP, CD	
E-86513	Zeke	Kicked in the Teeth	1998	LP, CD	
E-86514	Rich Kids on LSD	Still Flailing After All These Beers	1997	VHS	
E-86515	New Bomb Turks	At Rope's End	1998	LP, CD	
E-86516	The Cramps	Big Beat from Badsville	1997	LP, CD	
E-86517	Green Day	Kerplunk!	1992	LP, CD	Re-released in Europe on Epitaph in 1997.
E-86518	NOFX	So Long and Thanks for All the Shoes	1997	LP, CD	
E-86520	I Against I	Top of the World	1997		Single release; released only in Europe.
E-86521	Pulley	60 Cycle Hum	1997	LP, CD	
E-86522	Green Day	1,039/Smoothed Out Slappy Hours	1990	LP, CD	Re-released in Europe on Epitaph in 1997.
E-86523	Down by Law	Question Marks and Periods	1997		Single release.
E-86524	The Humpers	Euphoria, Confusion, Anger, Remorse	1999	LP, CD	
E-86525	I Against I	Headcleaner	1998	LP, CD	
E-86527	The Cramps	Like a Bad Girl Should	1997		Single release; released only in Europe.
E-86528	Red Aunts	Ghetto Blaster	1998	LP, CD	
E-86529	The Fleshtones	More Than Skin Deep	1998	LP, CD	Released only in Europe.
E-86531	ALL	Mass Nerder	1998	LP, CD	
E-86532	The Offspring	I Choose	1997		Single release; released only in Europe.
E-86534	various artists	Punk-O-Rama III	1998	CD	The American version of this Punk-O-Rama series release includes songs by NOFX, Dwarves, All, Bouncing Souls, Voodoo Glow Skulls, H_{2}O, Straight Faced, ZEKE, Union 13, Agnostic Front, New Bomb Turks, The Cramps, Rancid, Humpers, Wayne Kramer, Gas Huffer, Red Aunts, Down By Law, Osker, Ten Foot Pole, Millencolin, Bad Religion, I Against I, Pulley, and Pennywise. The European version does not include music by Millencolin, and does include music by Undeclinable, Looking Up, and Burning Heads.
E-86535	Voodoo Glow Skulls	The Band Geek Mafia	1998	LP, CD	
E-86536	Agnostic Front	Something's Gotta Give	1998	LP, CD	
E-86538	Straightfaced	Conditioned	1998	LP, CD	
E-86539	Wayne Kramer	LLMF	1999	LP, CD	
E-86543	Looking Up	Got Another Answer?	1998	CD	Released only in Europe.
E-86544	Union 13	Why Are We Destroying Ourselves?	1998	LP, CD	
E-86545	Millencolin	Same Old Tunes	1998	CD	Originally recorded in 1994, but not released until 1998.
E-86546	Heideroosjes	Smile, You're Dying	1998	LP, CD	Released only in Europe.
E-86547	Tom Waits	Mule Variations	1999	CD	
E-86548	Osker	Treatment 5	2000	LP, CD	
E-86549	The Bouncing Souls	Tie One On (EP)	1998	CD	
E-86550	The Bouncing Souls	Hopeless Romantic	1999	LP, CD	
E-86552	Ten Foot Pole	Insider	1999	LP, CD	
E-86553	Pennywise	Straight Ahead	1999	LP, CD	
E-86554	Pulley	@#!*	1999	LP, CD	
E-86555	Better Than a Thousand	Value Driven	1999	CD	Released only in Europe.
E-86556	H_{2}O	F.T.T.W.	1999	LP, CD	
E-86558	The Fleshtones	Hitsburg Revisited	1998	LP, CD	Released only in Europe.
E-86559	Beatsteaks	Launched	2000	CD	
E-86560	Heideroosjes	Schizo	1998	LP, CD	Released only in Europe.
E-86561	New Bomb Turks	Nightmare Scenario	2000	LP, CD	
E-86562	Zeke	Dirty Sanchez	2000	LP, CD	
E-86563	various artists	Punk-O-Rama 4: Straight Outta the Pit	2000	CD	The American version of this Punk-O-Rama series release includes songs by Pennywise, Pulley, H_{2}O, Rancid, Bombshell Rocks, The Bouncing Souls, Ten Foot Pole, ALL, New Bomb Turks, Bad Religion, Dwarves, Straight Faced, Agnostic Front, 59 Times the Pain, Refused, Voodoo Glow Skulls, Zeke, Gas Huffer, Tom Waits, Gentleman Jack Grisham, Union 13, 98 Mute, Osker, Millencolin, and NOFX. The European version does not include music by Bombshell Rocks, 59 Times the Pain, Refused, or Millencolin, and does include music by Heideroosjes, Beatsteaks, Man Or Astro-Man?, and I Against I.
E-86564	Man or Astro-man?	EEVIAC	1999	LP, CD	Released only in Europe.
E-86567	Agnostic Front	Riot, Riot, Upstart	1999	LP, CD	
E-86568	I Against I	I'm A Fucked Up Dancer But My Moods Are Swinging	1999	LP, CD	Released only in Europe.
E-86569	Midget Handjob	Midnight Snack Break at the Poodle Factory	2000	CD	
E-86570	Guy Smiley	Alkaline	1999	CD	Released only in Europe.
E-86571	Zen Guerrilla	Trance States in Tongues	1999	LP, CD	Released only in Europe.
E-86572	Burning Heads	Escape	1998	LP, CD	Released only in Europe.
E-86573	Millencolin	Millencolin and the Hi-8 Adventures	1999	VHS, DVD	Originally released on VHs in 1999; re-released on DVD in 2003.
E-86574	98 Mute	Slow Motion Riot	2000	LP, CD	
E-86575	The Dwarves	Come Clean	2000	LP, CD	
E-86576	H_{2}O	Faster Than the World	2000	VHS	
E-86577	Vision	Watching the World Burn	2000	LP, CD	
E-86578	Madball	Hold It Down	2000	LP, CD	
E-86579	The Joykiller	Ready Sexed Go	2003	CD	
E-86582	Voodoo Glow Skulls	Symbolic	2000	CD	
E-86584	NOFX	Pump Up the Valuum	2000	LP, CD	
E-86585	ALL	Problematic	2000	LP, CD	
E-86586	Straightfaced	Pulling Teeth	2000	LP, CD	
E-86587	The Get Up Kids	Something to Write Home About	2000	LP, CD	Released only in Europe.
E-86588	various artists	Punk-O-Rama#5	2000	CD	The American version of this Punk-O-Rama series release includes songs by NOFX, All, Millencolin, The (International) Noise Conspiracy, Vision, Rancid, Guttermouth, Osker, Dwarves, 98 Mute, Beatsteaks, H2O, Madball, Straight Faced, Refused, Death By Stereo, Bombshell Rocks, Dropkick Murphys, The Bouncing Souls, Satanic Surfers, Pennywise, Pulley, Union 13, Voodoo Glow Skulls, The Hives, New Bomb Turks, Zeke, and Agnostic Front. The European version does not contain music by Millencolin, The (International) Noise Conspiracy, Refused, Bombshell Rocks, Satanic Surfers, or The Hives, and does contain music by Guy Smiley, Terrorgruppe, Burning Heads, I Against I, Heideroosjes, and Zen Guerilla.
E-86589	Guttermouth	Covered With Ants	2001	LP, CD	
E-86590	Death by Stereo	Day of the Death	2001	CD	
E-86591	Union 13	Youth, Betrayal and the Awakening	2000	LP, CD	
E-86594	NOFX	Bottles to the Ground (EP)	2000	CD	
E-86598	Pennywise	Live @ the Key Club	2000	LP, CD	
E-86599	Deviates	Time Is the Distance	2001	LP, CD	
E-86600	Pennywise	Land of the Free?	2001	LP, CD	
E-86601	downset.	Check Your People	2000	LP, CD	
E-86604	Osker	Idle Will Kill	2001	CD	
E-86606	The Bouncing Souls	How I Spent My Summer Vacation	2001	LP, CD	
E-86612	Beatsteaks	Living Targets	2002	CD	
E-86614	Hot Water Music	A Flight and a Crash	2001	LP, CD	
E-86615	various artists	Punk-O-Rama 2001, Vol. 6	2001	CD	The American version of this Punk-O-Rama series release includes songs by Guttermouth, Deviates, NOFX, Millencolin, Hot Water Music, The Bouncing Souls, Pennywise with Exene Cervenka, Osker, Rancid, Death by Stereo, Dropkick Murphys, Descendents, Pulley, ALL, Raised Fist, Downset, Beatsteaks, Union 13, Bad Religion, The (International) Noise Conspiracy, Voodoo Glow Skulls, Bombshell Rocks, and The Business. The European version does not contain music by Millencolin, Raised Fist, The (International) Noise Conspiracy, Bombshell Rocks, or The Business, and does contain music by The Donnas, Heideroosjes, Undeclinable, and Terrorgruppe.
E-86616	Heideroosjes	Fast Forward	2001	LP, CD	Released only in Europe.
E-86618	ALL	Live + One	2001	CD	
E-86619	Pulley	Together Again for the First Time	2001	CD	
E-86629	Tom Waits	Blood Money	2002	LP, CD	
E-86630	Agnostic Front	Dead Yuppies	2001	CD	
E-86632	Tom Waits	Alice	2002	LP, CD	
E-86635	Bad Religion	The Process of Belief	2002	LP, CD	
E-86638	1208	Feedback Is Payback	2002	CD	
E-86639	98 Mute	After the Fall	2002	CD	
E-86641	Down by Law	Punkrockdays: The Best Of DBL	2002	CD	
E-86643	Death by Stereo	Into the Valley of Death	2003	LP, CD	
E-86644	Guttermouth	Gusto!	2002	CD	
E-86646	various artists	Punk-O-Rama 7	2002	CD	The American version of this Punk-O-Rama series release includes songs by Millencolin, Hot Water Music, The (International) Noise Conspiracy, Pennywise, Division of Laura Lee, NOFX, Randy, Pulley, The Bouncing Souls, Beatsteaks, Bad Religion, Deviates, Dropkick Murphys, Rancid, Death by Stereo, Agnostic Front, 1208, 98 Mute, and Guttermouth. The European version also contains songs by Flogging Molly and Heideroosjes.
E-86649	various artists	Punk-O-Rama: The Videos, Volume 1	2003	DVD	This Punk-O-Rama series release includes songs by Rancid, Refused, Bad Religion, NOFX, The Offspring, Pennywise, Millencolin, The Bouncing Souls, The (International) Noise Conspiracy, Hot Water Music, Descendents, Dropkick Murphys, Guttermouth, Division Of Laura Lee, Death By Stereo.
E-86650	Hot Water Music	Caution	2002	LP, CD	
E-86658	The Dillinger Escape Plan	Irony Is a Dead Scene (EP)	2002	CD	
E-86659	Bad Religion	Live at the Palladium	2006	DVD	
E-86660	Matchbook Romance	Stories and Alibis	2003	CD	
E-86661	Daniel Lanois	Shine	2003	LP, CD	
E-86662	Ikara Colt	Chat and Business	2002	CD	
E-86664	Pennywise	From the Ashes	2003	CD	
E-86666	Error	Error (EP)	2004	CD	
E-86667	The Locust	Plague Soundscapes	2003	LP, CD	
E-86668	Nick Cave and the Bad Seeds	Nocturama	2003	CD	
E-86669	The Bouncing Souls	Anchors Aweigh	2003		
E-86671	Noam Chomsky	Distorted Morality	2003	DVD	
E-86672	Pulley	Matters	2004	CD	
E-86673	various artists	Punk-O-Rama 8	2003	CD	The American version of this Punk-O-Rama series release includes songs by The Distillers, Motion City Soundtrack, Hot Water Music, Rancid, The Bouncing Souls, Matchbook Romance, NOFX, Bad Religion, Division of Laura Lee, Ikara Colt, F-Minus, Sage Francis, The (International) Noise Conspiracy, Randy, The Black Keys, Death By Stereo, Refused, Pennywise, Dropkick Murphys, Transplants, Atmosphere, Turbonegro, Tiger Army, Millencolin, Pulley, Guttermouth, Bombshell Rocks, Raised Fist, No Fun at All, U.S. Bombs, and Error. The European version also contains songs by Sugarcult, Beatsteaks, and Looptroop.
E-86675	Matchbook Romance	West for Wishing (EP)	2003	CD	
E-86677	Tom Waits	Orphans	2006	CD	
E-86678	Tom Waits	Real Gone	2004	LP, CD	
E-86679	Motion City Soundtrack	I Am the Movie	2003	LP, CD	
E-86680	Ikara Colt	Basic Instructions (EP)	2003	CD	
E-86682	The Weakerthans	Reconstruction Site	2003	LP, CD	
E-86688	1208	Turn of the Screw	2004	CD	
E-86690	Atmosphere	Seven's Travels	2003	LP, CD	
E-86694	Bad Religion	The Empire Strikes First	2004	LP, CD	
E-86695	The Special Goodness	Land Air Sea	2004	LP, CD	
E-86699	The Matches	E. Von Dahl Killed the Locals	2004	LP, CD	
E-86700	Bad Religion	How Could Hell Be Any Worse?	2004	CD	Remastered versions.
E-86701	Bad Religion	Suffer	2004	CD	Remastered versions.
E-86702	Bad Religion	No Control	2004	CD	Remastered versions.
E-86703	Bad Religion	Against the Grain	2004	CD	Remastered versions.
E-86704	Bad Religion	Generator	2004	CD	Remastered versions.
E-86705	The Frames	Set List	2004	CD	
E-86707	From First to Last	Dear Diary, My Teen Angst Has a Body Count	2004	CD	
E-86708	Scatter the Ashes	Devout/The Modern Hymn	2004	CD	
E-86709	Sage Francis	A Healthy Distrust	2005	LP, CD	
E-86710	Eyedea & Abilities	E&A	2004	CD	
E-86711	Danny Cohen	Dannyland	2004	CD	
E-86715	Converge	You Fail Me	2004	CD	
E-86716	various artists	Punk-O-Rama Vol. 9	2004	CD	This Punk-O-Rama series release includes songs by Bad Religion, From First to Last, The Matches, Atmosphere, Pennywise, Motion City Soundtrack, Rancid, Dropkick Murphys, The Weakerthans, Matchbook Romance, Scatter the Ashes, Refused, Nekromantix, Pulley, 1208, The Bouncing Souls, Hot Water Music, The Special Goodness, HorrorPops, Tiger Army, Division Of Laura Lee, Error, Eyedea & Abilities, Death By Stereo, Randy, Converge, and Beatsteaks.
E-86718	Guttermouth	Eat Your Face	2004	CD	
E-86719	A Girl Called Eddy	A Girl Called Eddy	2002	CD	
E-86720	The Coup	Pick a Bigger Weapon	2006	CD	
E-86722	Hot Water Music	The New What Next	2004	CD	
E-86723	none	Black & White	2004	DVD	
E-86724	none	The DC Video	2004	DVD	
E-86725	Circle One	Circle one	2004	DVD	
E-86727	NOFX	The Greatest Songs Ever Written (By Us!)	2004	CD	
E-86728	Matchbook Romance	Matchbook Romance/Motion City Soundtrack	2004	LP, CD	Split release.
E-86729	Nick Cave and the Bad Seeds	Abattoir Blues/The Lyre of Orpheus	2004	CD	
E-86730	none	Second Thoughts	2004	DVD	
E-86730	none	Football Shmootball	2004	DVD	
E-86733	Suicide Girls (compilation)	Black Heart Retrospective	2005	CD	
E-86736	Pennywise	Pennywise	2005	CD	Remastered versions.
E-86737	Pennywise	Unknown Road	2005	CD	Remastered versions.
E-86738	Pennywise	About Time	2005	CD	Remastered versions.
E-86739	Pennywise	Full Circle	2005	CD	Remastered versions.
E-86741	Elliott Smith	From a Basement on the Hill	2004	LP, CD	
E-86745	Blackalicious	The Craft	2005	CD	
E-86747	The Coup	Party Music	2004	CD	Re-release. Originally release in 2001 by 75 Ark Records
E-86748	The Locust	New Erections	2007	CD	
E-86749	The Frames	Burn the Maps	2005	CD	
E-86750	Motion City Soundtrack	Commit This to Memory	2005	CD	
E-86754	Death by Stereo	Death for Life	2005	CD	
E-86755	various artists	Punk-O-Rama 10	2005	CD	This Punk-O-Rama series release includes songs by Motion City Soundtrack, Matchbook Romance, The Matches, From First to Last, Sage Francis, Bad Religion, This Is Me Smiling, Youth Group, Scatter the Ashes, Some Girls, Dangerdoom, The Offspring, Converge, Hot Water Music, The Bouncing Souls, Millencolin, Dropkick Murphys, The Unseen, Rancid, Pennywise, NOFX, Pulley, The Special Goodness, Tiger Army, Roger Miret and the Disasters, The Coup, C. Aarme, The Weakerthans, The Black Keys, Atmosphere, and HorrorPops.
E-86761	various artists	Epitaph Tour 2005	2005	CD	Contains songs by Matchbook Romance, Motion City Soundtrack, The Matches, From First To Last, Scatter The Ashes, Converge, and Hot Water Music.
E-86762	Pete Philly and Perquisite	Mindstate	2006	LP, CD	
E-86763	Youth Group	Skeleton Jar	2005	CD	
E-86769	Pennywise	The Fuse	2005	CD	
E-86770	N/A	Vans Triple Crown of Surfing	2005	DVD	
E-86771	Tim Fite	Gone Ain't Gone	2005	CD	
E-86773	Some Girls	Heaven's Pregnant Teens	2006	CD	
E-86774	Matchbook Romance	Voices	2006	CD	
E-86775	DANGERDOOM	The Mouse and the Mask	2005	CD	
E-86777	Neko Case	Fox Confessor Brings the Flood	2006	CD	
E-86778	The Robocop Kraus	They Think They Are The Robocop Kraus	2006	CD	
E-86779	From First to Last	Heroine	2006	CD	
E-86780	Suicide Girls	Suicide Girls: The First Tour	2005	DVD	
E-86781	Day of Contempt	The Will to Live	2005	CD	
E-86789	I Am Ghost	We Are Always Searching (EP)	2005	CD	
E-86796	Vanna	The Search Party Never Came (EP)	2006	CD	
E-86800	I Am Ghost	Lovers' Requiem	2006	CD	
E-86801	Escape the Fate	There's No Sympathy for the Dead (EP)	2006	CD	
E-86802	Motion City Soundtrack	Commit This to Memory	2006	CD	Deluxe edition version.
E-86808	The Bouncing Souls	The Gold Record	2006	CD	
E-86809	Greg Graffin	Cold as the Clay	2006	CD	
E-86810	Busdriver	RoadKillOvercoat	2007	CD	
E-86813	various artists	Unsound	2007	CD	First of the Unsound series, this release contains songs by From First to Last, Escape the Fate, The Matches, Youth Group, Motion City Soundtrack, Matchbook Romance, Vanna, Converge, Some Girls, I Am Ghost, DANGERDOOM, Bad Religion, The Bouncing Souls, Pennywise, The Draft, Sage Francis, From First to Last, The Robocop Kraus.
E-86815	The Matches	Decomposer	2006	CD	
E-86816	The Draft	In a Million Pieces	2006	CD	
E-86817	Rogue's Gallery	Pirate Ballads, Sea Songs & Chanteys	2006	CD	
E-86818	Youth Group	Casino Twilight Dogs	2007	CD	
E-86824	Parkway Drive	Killing with a Smile	2006	CD	
E-86825	Solillaquists of Sound	As If We Existed	2006	CD	
E-86827	Converge	No Heroes	2006	CD	
E-86828	Heavens	Patent Pending	2006	CD	
E-86829	Busdriver	Kill Your Employer	2006	LP	Single release.
E-86832	Escape the Fate	Dying Is Your Latest Fashion	2006	CD	
E-86838	The Higher	On Fire	2007	CD	
E-86849	Vanna	Curses	2007	CD	
E-86855	The Higher	Pace Yourself (EP)	2006	Digital	iTunes Exclusive release.
E-86858	Sage Francis	Human the Death Dance	2007	LP, CD	
E-86861	Grinderman	Grinderman	2007	CD	
E-86863	Bad Religion	New Maps of Hell	2007	CD	
E-86871	The Draft	The Draft (EP)	2007	CD	
E-86879	Farewell	Isn't This Supposed To Be Fun!?	2007	CD	
E-86800	Darkest Souls	Going Down To Hell	2009	LP, CD	
E-86920	various artists	Epitaph New Noise Volume 01	2010	Digital Download, CD	Contains songs by Veara, Sing It Loud, Our Last Night, Parkway Drive, Set Your Goals, Alkaline Trio, Frank Turner, Off With Their Heads, Street Dogs, New Found Glory, Heartsounds, Every Time I Die, Escape The Fate, and I Set My Friends On Fire.
E-71371	Frank Turner	Rock & Roll	2010	LP, CD	
E-71372	Bad Religion	30 Years LP Box Set	2010	LP	
E-87875	The Linda Lindas	Growing Up	2022	LP, CD, digital download	
	The Linda Lindas	No Obligation	2024	LP, digital download	
EPI-V1, EPI-VC1	The Vandals	Peace thru Vandalism (EP)	1982	12″EP, cassette	
