= Punk-O-Rama =

Compilation albums

Punk-O-Rama is the title given to a series of ten compilation albums published by Epitaph Records. The first volume was released in 1994, the second in 1996, and the rest annually from 1998 to 2005. The albums included artists from Epitaph's roster as well as from its subsidiary label Anti- and its partnership labels Hellcat Records and Burning Heart Records. In total the series included 257 songs contributed by 88 different artists.

Rancid and Pennywise are the only bands to appear on all 10 volumes. Scott Radinsky appears on all 10, 1 with Ten Foot Pole and 9 with Pulley.

As its title implied, the series featured mostly punk rock and various punk subgenres such as garage punk, hardcore punk, pop-punk, post-hardcore, ska punk, skate punk, and street punk. However, as the series went on and the labels' rosters diversified, the music of the Punk-O-Rama compilations grew to include additional styles of music such as alternative hip-hop, alternative rock, digital hardcore, emo, experimental music, garage rock, indie rock, metalcore, psychobilly, and screamo.

Artwork for the series was inconsistent over the first four installments, with cover art and layout provided by varying artists and designers. C. Martin provided artwork and layout for both the fifth and sixth volumes, though they had differing styles and themes. Nick Pritchard of Metrosea.com provided artwork and layout for the final four volumes of the series, which adopted a similar look and style.

Epitaph also organized several Punk-O-Rama tours featuring bands that had contributed to the compilations, such as Agnostic Front, All, The Distillers, Guttermouth, Millencolin, Straight Faced, and the Voodoo Glow Skulls. Occasionally these would be accompanied by special Punk-O-Rama tour sampler CDs that differed from the main. series of compilation albums. In 2003 the label published the DVD Punk-O-Rama: The Videos, Volume 1, including 22 music videos and "The Epitaph Story", a short film relating the history of the label. Though a second volume was never published, the subsequent ninth and tenth albums in the compilation series included DVDs of music videos as well.

In 2006 Epitaph announced the retirement of the Punk-O-Rama brand in favor of a new series titled Unsound, the less genre-specific title being more conducive to the label's expanding roster of musical styles. However, only one compilation was published under the Unsound banner before that series was also discontinued.

== Releases ==
=== CDs ===
==== Punk-O-Rama (1994) ====
Punk-O-Rama

Compilation album by Various Artists
- Released: November 18, 1994
- Genre: Punk rock
- Length: 45:16
- Label: Epitaph

Punk-O-Rama chronology
Punk-O-Rama (1994)	Punk-O-Rama Vol. 2 (1996)

Punk-O-Rama is a compilation album released by Epitaph Records on November 18, 1994. Featuring twelve bands from the label's roster, the album was the first installment in the Punk-O-Rama series which continued until 2005.

No.	Title	Writer(s)	Artist	Length
1.	"Do What You Want" (from Suffer, 1988)	Brett Gurewitz	Bad Religion	1:06
2.	"Don't Call Me White" (from Punk in Drublic, 1994)	Fat Mike	NOFX	2:33
3.	"Hyena" (from Rancid, 1993)	Tim Armstrong, Matt Freeman	Rancid	2:55
4.	"Session" (from Ignition, 1992)	Dexter Holland, Kristine Luna, Jill Eckhaus	The Offspring	2:32
5.	"Dying to Know" (from Unknown Road, 1993)	Jim Lindberg, Fletcher Dragge, Randy Bradbury, Jason Thirsk, Byron McMackin	Pennywise	3:06
6.	"I Wanna Riot" (from "Roots Radicals", 1995)		Rancid	3:11
7.	"Riot City" (from Pledge of Defiance, 1994)		Total Chaos	2:20
8.	"Crooked Bird" (from One Inch Masters, 1994)		Gas Huffer	3:05
9.	"We're Back, We're Pissed" (from Riches to Rags, 1994)		RKL	3:39
10.	"Jennifer Lost the War" (from The Offspring, 1989)	Holland	The Offspring	2:34
11.	"Bright Green Globe" (from Punkrockacademyfightsong, 1994)		Down by Law	3:36
12.	"Open Door" (from Pennywise, 1991)	Dragge, Lindberg, McMackin, Thirsk	Pennywise	1:42
13.	"Crack in the Universe" (from The Hard Stuff, 1995)		Wayne Kramer	4:40
14.	"Liza and Louise" (from White Trash, Two Heebs and a Bean, 1992)	Fat Mike	NOFX	2:22
15.	"My Wall" (from Rev, 1994)		Ten Foot Pole	2:50
16.	"Reality Is a Ride on the Bus" (from Something Green and Leafy This Way Comes, 1993)	Ken Chinn, Marc Belke, Brent Belke, Rob Johnson, Dave Rees	SNFU	3:05
Total length:				45:16

==== Punk-O-Rama Vol. 2 (1996) ====
Punk-O-Rama Vol. 2

Compilation album by Various Artists
- Released: December 3, 1996
- Genre: Punk rock
- Length: 39:49
- Label: Epitaph
- Producer: Various

Punk-O-Rama chronology
Punk-O-Rama (1994)	Punk-O-Rama Vol. 2 (1996)	Vans Warped Tour '97 Presents Punk-O-Rama 2.1 (1997)

Professional ratings
Review scores
Source	Rating
AllMusic	link

Punk-O-Rama Vol. 2 is the second compilation album in the Punk-O-Rama series. This was the first entry to be released at a low price, so that it was more appealing for someone to buy to check out Epitaph's artists.

All of the songs were previously released with the exception of DFL's "Thought Control". Me First and the Gimme Gimmes' cover of Billy Joel's "Only the Good Die Young" made its CD debut here, as it was previously only available on Billy, a vinyl single released by the band.

No.	Title	Artist	Length
1.	"Coffee Mug" (from Everything Sucks)	Descendents	0:34
2.	"Perfect People" (from About Time)	Pennywise	3:03
3.	"Cashed In" (from Esteem Driven Engine)	Pulley	2:13
4.	"Only the Good Die Young" (from Have Another Ball)	Me First and the Gimme Gimmes	2:48
5.	"Mutate With Me" (from Plastique Valentine)	The Humpers	2:12
6.	"Sidekick" (from Let's Go)	Rancid	2:01
7.	"Bullion" (from Life on a Plate)	Millencolin	2:00
8.	"El Coo Cooi" (from Firme)	Voodoo Glow Skulls	2:37
9.	"Hate" (from Static)	The Joykiller	2:08
10.	"Code Blue" (from Dance With Me)	T.S.O.L.	2:08
11.	"Whatever Didi Wants" (from Heavy Petting Zoo)	NOFX	3:01
12.	"Gruesome Gary" (from All Scratched Up)	Down By Law	3:02
13.	"Just to Get Away" (from Feel the Darkness)	Poison Idea	2:30
14.	"Thought Control" (Previously Unreleased)	Dead Fucking Last	2:18
15.	"Don't Have the Cow" (from FYULABA)	SNFU	2:38
16.	"Give You Nothing" (from Suffer)	Bad Religion	2:00
17.	"Jukebox Lean" (from Scared Straight)	New Bomb Turks	2:36

==== Vans Warped Tour '97 Presents Punk-O-Rama 2.1 (1997) ====
Vans Warped Tour '97 Presents Punk-O-Rama 2.1

Compilation album by Various Artists
- Released: September 26, 1997
- Genre: Punk rock
- Length: 40:54
- Label: Epitaph
- Producer: Various

Punk-O-Rama chronology
Punk-O-Rama Vol. 2 (1996)	Vans Warped Tour '97 Presents Punk-O-Rama 2.1 (1997)	Punk-O-Rama III (1998)

A tour edition of this volume was released in conjunction with the 1997 Vans Warped Tour. The artwork and track listing are slightly modified. The track listing is as follows:

No.	Title	Artist	Length
1.	"Coffee Mug" (from Everything Sucks)	Descendents	0:34
2.	"Fight 'Till You Die"	Pennywise	2:57
3.	"Cashed In" (from Esteem Driven Engine)	Pulley	2:13
4.	"Family Tree"	H_{2}O	2:54
5.	"Mutate With Me" (from Plastique Valentine)	The Humpers	2:12
6.	"Side Kick" (from Let's Go)	Rancid	2:01
7.	"Bullion" (from Life on a Plate)	Millencolin	2:00
8.	"El Coo Cooi" (from Firme)	Voodoo Glow Skulls	2:37
9.	"Hate" (from Static)	The Joykiller	2:08
10.	"Whatever Didi Wants" (from Heavy Petting Zoo)	NOFX	3:01
11.	"No Equalizer"	Down by Law	2:47
12.	"Thought Control" (from Home is Where the Heart Is)	Dead Fucking Last	2:18
13.	"You Make Me Thick"	SNFU	2:18
14.	"Give You Nothing" (from Suffer)	Bad Religion	2:00
15.	"Jukebox Lean" (from Scared Straight)	New Bomb Turks	2:36
16.	"Regret"	Ten Foot Pole	2:37
17.	"Bobby & Joe"	Hepcat	2:24

==== Punk-O-Rama III (1998) ====
Punk-O-Rama III

Compilation album by Various Artists
- Released: June 30, 1998
- Genre: Punk rock
- Length: 62:30
- Label: Epitaph
- Producer: Various

Punk-O-Rama chronology
Vans Warped Tour '97 Presents Punk-O-Rama 2.1 (1997)	Punk-O-Rama III (1998)	Punk-O-Rama 4 (1999)

Professional ratings
Review scores
Source	Rating
AllMusic	link

Punk-O-Rama III is the third compilation album in the Punk-O-Rama series.

This entry features two previously unreleased tracks, "We Threw Gasoline on the Fire and Now We Have Stumps for Arms and No Eyebrows" by NOFX and "Wake Up" by Pennywise. NOFX's track was later released on their rarities compilation 45 or 46 Songs That Weren't Good Enough to Go on Our Other Records. The European version has Undeclinable Ambuscade's track "7 Years" and takes off "Lozin' Must" by Millencolin.

No.	Title	Artist	Length
1.	"We Threw Gasoline on the Fire and Now We Have Stumps for Arms and No Eyebrows"	NOFX
2.	"Everybodies Girl (from The Dwarves Are Young and Good Looking)"	Dwarves
3.	"World's on Heroin (from Mass Nerder)"	All
4.	"Say Anything (from The Bouncing Souls)"	Bouncing Souls
5.	"Delinquent Song (from The Band Geek Mafia)"	Voodoo Glow Skulls
6.	"Everready (from Thicker than Water)"	H_{2}O
7.	"Greed Motivates (from Conditioned)"	Straight Faced
8.	"Telepath Boy (from Kicked in the Teeth)"	ZEKE
9.	"Never Connected (from Why Are We Destroying Ourselves?)"	Union 13
10.	"Gotta Go (from Working Class Heroes split with Discipline)"	Agnostic Front
11.	"Defiled (from At Rope's End)"	New Bomb Turks
12.	"Haulass Hyena (from Big Beat from Badsville)"	The Cramps
13.	"Rats in the Hallway (from Rancid)"	Rancid
14.	"Steel-Toed Sneakers (from Euphoria, Confusion, Anger, Remorse)"	Humpers
15.	"Bad Seed (from The Hard Stuff)"	Wayne Kramer
16.	"Rotten Egg (from Just Beautiful Music)"	Gas Huffer
17.	"Poison Steak (from Ghetto Blaster)"	Red Aunts
18.	"No Equalizer (from Last of the Sharpshooters)"	Down By Law
19.	"Alright (from Treatment 5)"	Osker
20.	"A.D.D. (from Unleashed)"	Ten Foot Pole
21.	"Lozin' Must (from For Monkeys)"	Millencolin
22.	"You (from No Control)"	Bad Religion
23.	"Ordinary Fight (from Headcleaner)"	I Against I
24.	"If (from 60 Cycle Hum)"	Pulley
25.	"Wake Up"	Pennywise

Europe version

No.	Title	Artist	Length
1.	"We Threw Gasoline on the Fire and Now We Have Stumps for Arms and No Eyebrows"	NOFX
2.	"Everybodies Girl (from The Dwarves Are Young and Good Looking)"	Dwarves
3.	"World's on Heroin (from Mass Nerder)"	All
4.	"Say Anything (from The Bouncing Souls)"	Bouncing Souls
5.	"Delinquent Song (from The Band Geek Mafia)"	Voodoo Glow Skulls
6.	"Everready (from Thicker than Water)"	H_{2}O
7.	"Greed Motivates (from Conditioned)"	Straight Faced
8.	"Telepath Boy (from Kicked in the Teeth)"	ZEKE
9.	"Never Connected (from Why Are We Destroying Ourselves?)"	Union 13
10.	"Gotta Go (from Working Class Heroes split with Discipline)"	Agnostic Front
11.	"Defiled (from At Rope's End)"	New Bomb Turks
12.	"Haulass Hyena (from Big Beat from Badsville)"	The Cramps
13.	"Rats in the Hallway (from Rancid)"	Rancid
14.	"Steel-Toed Sneakers (from Euphoria, Confusion, Anger, Remorse)"	Humpers
15.	"Bad Seed (from The Hard Stuff)"	Wayne Kramer
16.	"Rotten Egg (from Just Beautiful Music)"	Gas Huffer
17.	"Poison Steak (from Ghetto Blaster)"	Red Aunts
18.	"No Equalizer (from Last of the Sharpshooters)"	Down By Law
19.	"Alright (from Treatment 5)"	Osker
20.	"A.D.D. (from Unleashed)"	Ten Foot Pole
21.	"7 Years (from One For The Money)"	Undeclinable Ambuscade
22.	"You (from No Control)"	Bad Religion
23.	"Nailed To The Floor (from Headcleaner)"	I Against I
24.	"3 Times 75 (from Got Another Answer)"	Looking Up
25.	"Times Up (from Be One With The Flames)"	Burning Heads
26.	"If (from 60 Cycle Hum)"	Pulley
27.	"Wake Up"	Pennywise

==== Punk-O-Rama 4: Straight Outta The Pit (1999) ====
Punk-O-Rama 4

Compilation album by Various Artists
- Released: June 22, 1999
- Genre: Punk rock
- Length: 58:56
- Label: Epitaph
- Producer: Various

Punk-O-Rama chronology
Punk-O-Rama III (1998)	Punk-O-Rama 4 (1999)	Punk-O-Rama 5 (2000)

Professional ratings
Review scores
Source	Rating
AllMusic	link

Punk-O-Rama 4 is the fourth compilation album in the Punk-O-Rama series. This is the only entry to have a sub-title.

All of the tracks were previously released except the first track, "Fight It" by Pennywise.

This was the first entry to include bands from the Swedish Burning Heart Records label, which has its material distributed by Epitaph Records in North America. It also includes a song from the Tom Waits album Mule Variations, which was released on Epitaph's indie rock label Anti-.

No.	Title	Artist	Length
1.	"Fight It"	Pennywise	2:15
2.	"Second Best"	Pulley	1:49
3.	"Faster Than the World"	H_{2}O	2:17
4.	"1998"	Rancid	2:46
5.	"The Will the Message"	Bombshell Rocks	2:37
6.	"Hopeless Romantic"	The Bouncing Souls	2:07
7.	"The Getaway"	Ten Foot Pole	3:41
8.	"Think the World"	ALL	1:21
9.	"Snap Decision (At Rope's End)"	New Bomb Turks	2:23
10.	"Generator"	Bad Religion	3:19
11.	"I Will Deny"	Dwarves	1:39
12.	"Let's Do This"	Straight Faced	1:23
13.	"It's My Life"	Agnostic Front	2:29
14.	"Weakend Revolution"	59 Times the Pain	2:19
15.	"Summerholiday Vs. Punkroutine"	Refused	4:02
16.	"They Always Come Back"	Voodoo Glow Skulls	3:23
17.	"Twisted"	Zeke	1:56
18.	"Don't Panic"	Gas Huffer	1:46
19.	"Big in Japan"	Tom Waits	4:04
20.	"Someone to Love?"	Gentleman Jack Grisham	2:52
21.	"A Life's Story"	Union 13	2:09
22.	"Picture This"	98 Mute	2:05
23.	"Lucky"	Osker	2:14
24.	"Mr. Clean"	Millencolin	2:39
25.	"Kids of the K-Hole"	NOFX	4:49

Europe version

1. "Fight It" – Pennywise – 2:15
2. "Second Best" – Pulley – 1:49
3. "Faster Than the World" – H_{2}O – 2:17
4. "1998" – Rancid – 2:46
5. "Watch Me Play" – Heideroosjes – 2:26
6. "Hopeless Romantic" – The Bouncing Souls – 2:07
7. "The Getaway" – Ten Foot Pole – 3:41
8. "Think the World" – ALL – 1:21
9. "Snap Decision (At Rope's End)" – New Bomb Turks – 2:23
10. "Generator" – Bad Religion – 3:19
11. "I Will Deny" – Dwarves – 1:39
12. "Let's Do This" – Straight Faced – 1:23
13. "It's My Life" – Agnostic Front – 2:29
14. "Panic" – Beatsteaks – 2:40
15. "Theme from Eeviac" – Man Or Astro-Man? – 2:32
16. "They Always Come Back" – Voodoo Glow Skulls – 3:23
17. "Twisted" – Zeke – 1:56
18. "Don't Panic" – Gas Huffer – 1:46
19. "Big in Japan" – Tom Waits – 4:04
20. "Someone to Love?" – Gentleman Jack Grisham – 2:52
21. "A Life's Story" – Union 13 – 2:09
22. "Picture This" – 98 Mute – 2:05
23. "Lucky" – Osker – 2:14
24. "The Best Place in the World to Leave" – I Against I – 1:04
25. "Kids of the K-Hole" – NOFX – 4:49

==== Punk-O-Rama #5 (2000) ====
Punk-O-Rama 5

Compilation album by Various Artists
- Released: July 20, 2000
- Genre: Punk rock
- Length: 73:32
- Label: Epitaph
- Producer: Various

Punk-O-Rama chronology
Punk-O-Rama 4 (1999)	Punk-O-Rama 5 (2000)	Punk-O-Rama 2001, Vol. 6 (2001)

Professional ratings
Review scores
Source	Rating
AllMusic	link

Punk-O-Rama 5 is the fifth compilation album in the Punk-O-Rama series.

All of the tracks were previously released except for "Pump Up the Valium" by NOFX and "Problematic" by All. The latter two tracks were title tracks left off the bands' current albums at the time, NOFX's Pump Up the Valuum and ALL's Problematic. Also, NOFX's track was later released on the rarities compilation album 45 or 46 Songs That Weren't Good Enough to Go on Our Other Records.

"Secure Horizons" by Guttermouth was later rerecorded on their Covered With Ants record.
"Good Rats" by Dropkick Murphys was later rerecorded on their Sing Loud Sing Proud record.
The Rancid song "Poison" was a demo version of the song off their Rancid 5 record.

This is the only entry in the series not to include a song by Bad Religion.

No.	Title	Artist	Length
1.	"Pump up the Valuum"	NOFX	1:46
2.	"Problematic"	All	1:22
3.	"No Cigar"	Millencolin	2:45
4.	"Smash It Up"	The (International) Noise Conspiracy	3:14
5.	"Close Minded"	Vision	2:41
6.	"Poison"	Rancid	1:18
7.	"Secure Horizons"	Guttermouth	2:57
8.	"Panic"	Osker	2:21
9.	"Better Be Women"	Dwarves	2:35
10.	"Slow Motion Riot"	98 Mute	2:57
11.	"We Have to Figure It Out Tonight"	Beatsteaks	1:37
12.	"Guilty by Association"	H_{2}O	2:25
13.	"Hold It Down"	Madball	2:19
14.	"Happy"	Straight Faced	3:42
15.	"Refused Are Fucking Dead"	Refused	5:45
16.	"Lookin' Out for #1"	Death By Stereo	2:22
17.	"1.80 Down"	Bombshell Rocks	3:28
18.	"Good Rats"	Dropkick Murphys	3:03
19.	"Kid"	The Bouncing Souls	2:51
20.	"What Ever"	Satanic Surfers	2:17
21.	"Badge of Pride"	Pennywise	3:35
22.	"Gone"	Pulley	2:22
23.	"The Game"	Union 13	2:33
24.	"Stranded in the Jungle"	Voodoo Glow Skulls	3:05
25.	"Introduce the Metric System in Time"	The Hives	2:06
26.	"Automatic Teller"	New Bomb Turks	2:43
27.	"Evil Dead"	Zeke	1:09
28.	"Riot Riot Upstart"	Agnostic Front	2:14

Europe version

No.	Title	Artist	Length
1.	"Pump up the Valuum"	NOFX	1:46
2.	"Problematic"	All	1:22
3.	"Breakdown"	Guy Smiley	3:39
4.	"Destroy the Krauts"	Terrorgruppe	2:22
5.	"Close Minded"	Vision	2:41
6.	"Poison"	Rancid	1:18
7.	"Secure Horizons"	Guttermouth	2:57
8.	"Panic"	Osker	2:21
9.	"Better Be Women"	Dwarves	2:35
10.	"Slow Motion Riot"	98 Mute	2:57
11.	"We Have to Figure It Out Tonight"	Beatsteaks	1:37
12.	"Guilty by Association"	H_{2}O	2:25
13.	"Hold It Down"	Madball	2:19
14.	"Happy"	Straight Faced	3:42
15.	"Thinking of the Time"	Burning Heads	2:20
16.	"Lookin' Out for #1"	Death By Stereo	2:22
17.	"Space Odyssey"	I Against I	3:10
18.	"Good Rats"	Dropkick Murphys	3:03
19.	"Kid"	The Bouncing Souls	2:51
20.	"P.C.P.O.S."	Heideroosjes	2:35
21.	"Badge of Pride"	Pennywise	3:35
22.	"Gone"	Pulley	2:22
23.	"The Game"	Union 13	2:33
24.	"Stranded in the Jungle"	Voodoo Glow Skulls	3:05
25.	"Slow Motion Rewind"	Zen Guerilla	3:52
26.	"Automatic Teller"	New Bomb Turks	2:43
27.	"Evil Dead"	Zeke	1:09
28.	"Riot Riot Upstart"	Agnostic Front	2:14

==== Punk-O-Rama 2001, Vol. 6 (2001) ====
Punk-O-Rama 2001, Vol. 6

Compilation album by Various Artists
- Released: June 5, 2001
- Genre: Punk rock
- Length: 56:25 (US Release); 54:18 (UK Release)
- Label: Epitaph
- Producer: Various

Punk-O-Rama chronology
Punk-O-Rama 5 (2000)	Punk-O-Rama 2001, Vol. 6 (2001)	Punk-O-Rama 7 (2002)

Professional ratings
Review scores
Source	Rating
AllMusic	link
Ox-Fanzine	Favorable

Punk-O-Rama 2001, Vol. 6 is the sixth compilation album in the Punk-O-Rama series.

The cover is a reference to a scene in the movie 2001: A Space Odyssey, as this was the release from the year 2001.

The US release of Punk-O-Rama Vol. 6 included a total of five previously unreleased tracks. The unreleased tracks are "Blackeye" by Millencolin (US only), "We're Desperate" by Pennywise, "Original Me" by Descendents, "Let Me In" by Beatsteaks and "Bath of Least Resistance" by NOFX. Pennywise perform "We're Desperate" with Exene Cervenka, who is from X which is the band that originally performed the song. "Original Me" was originally performed by ALL, which is the band the members of the Descendents formed when Milo Aukerman went to college. "Bath of Least Resistance" by NOFX was later released on their rarities compilation 45 or 46 Songs That Weren't Good Enough to Go on Our Other Records. "Blackeye" by Millencolin was later released in their album Home from Home, and was the only previously unreleased track to not appear on the UK release of Punk-O-Rama Vol. 6.

No.	Title	Artist	Length
1.	"Can I Borrow Some Ambition?"	Guttermouth	2:20
2.	"Come With Me"	Deviates	2:57
3.	"Bath of Least Resistance"	NOFX	1:48
4.	"Blackeye/Do You Wanna Hit It" (US Release Only/European Release Only)	Millencolin/The Donnas	2:16/2:56
5.	"Jack of All Trades"	Hot Water Music	2:42
6.	"True Believers"	The Bouncing Souls	2:30
7.	"We're Desperate"	Pennywise with Exene Cervenka	1:47
8.	"Strangled"	Osker	2:58
9.	"It's Quite Alright"	Rancid	1:29
10.	"Holding 60 Dollars on a Burning Bridge"	Death by Stereo	2:11
11.	"The Gauntlet"	Dropkick Murphys	2:47
12.	"Original Me"	Descendents	2:50
13.	"Runaway"	Pulley	2:51
14.	"She Broke My Dick"	ALL	0:43
15.	"Different But the Same/Home" (US Release Only/European Release Only)	Raised Fist/Heideroosjes	2:35/1:58
16.	"Pure Trauma"	Downset	2:33
17.	"Let Me In"	Beatsteaks	3:28
18.	"Innocence"	Union 13	2:25
19.	"I Want to Conquer the World"	Bad Religion	2:17
20.	"Only Lovers Left Alive/Whatever" (US Release Only/European Release Only)	The (International) Noise Conspiracy/Undeclinable	2:41/3:22
21.	"Say Goodnight"	Voodoo Glow Skulls	3:02
22.	"Tonight I'm Burning/Do You Mind It" (US Release Only/European Release Only)	Bombshell Rocks/Terrorgruppe	2:54
23.	"Takers & Users" (US Release Only)	The Business	2:21

==== Punk-O-Rama 7 (2002) ====
Punk-O-Rama 7

Compilation album by Various Artists
- Released: June 25, 2002
- Genre: Punk rock
- Length: 54:19
- Label: Epitaph
- Producer: Various

Punk-O-Rama chronology
Punk-O-Rama 2001, Vol. 6 (2001)	Punk-O-Rama 7 (2002)	Punk-O-Rama 8 (2003)

Professional ratings
Review scores
Source	Rating
AllMusic	link

Punk-O-Rama 7 is the seventh compilation album in the Punk-O-Rama series.

1. "Fingers Crossed" – Millencolin – 2:47
2. "Wayfarer" – Hot Water Music – 2:58
3. "Up for Sale" – The (International) Noise Conspiracy – 3:26
4. "The World" – Pennywise – 2:26
5. "Black City" – Division of Laura Lee – 3:36
6. "Olympia, WA" – NOFX – 2:59
7. "Addicts of Communication" – Randy – 2:00
8. "Hooray for Me" – Pulley – 2:19
9. "The Something Special" – The Bouncing Souls – 3:23
10. "God Knows" – Beatsteaks – 2:34
11. "The Defense" – Bad Religion – 3:54
12. "The End" – Deviates – 2:02
13. "Heroes from Our Past" – Dropkick Murphys – 3:30
14. "Bob" – Rancid – 2:02
15. "Wasted Words" – Death by Stereo – 3:33
16. "Love to Be Hated" – Agnostic Front – 2:13
17. "Outside Looking In" – 1208 – 2:46
18. "M.A.D." – 98 Mute – 3:16
19. "My Girlfriend" – Guttermouth – 2:35

Europe version

1. "Fingers Crossed" – Millencolin – 2:47
2. "Wayfarer" – Hot Water Music – 2:58
3. "Up for Sale" – The (International) Noise Conspiracy – 3:26
4. "The World" – Pennywise – 2:26
5. "Black City" – Division of Laura Lee – 3:36
6. "Olympia, WA" – NOFX – 2:59
7. "Addicts of Communication" – Randy – 2:00
8. "Hooray for Me" – Pulley – 2:19
9. "The Something Special" – The Bouncing Souls – 3:23
10. "God Knows" – Beatsteaks – 2:34
11. "The Defense" – Bad Religion – 3:54
12. "The End" – Deviates – 2:02
13. "Heroes from Our Past" – Dropkick Murphys – 3:30
14. "Bob" – Rancid – 2:02
15. "Wasted Words" – Death by Stereo – 3:33
16. "Love to Be Hated" – Agnostic Front – 2:13
17. "Outside Looking In" – 1208 – 2:46
18. "M.A.D." – 98 Mute – 3:16
19. "My Girlfriend" – Guttermouth – 2:35
20. "What's Left of the Flag" – Flogging Molly – 3:39
21. "We're All Fucked Up" – Heideroosjes – 3:17

==== Punk-O-Rama 8 (2003) ====
Punk-O-Rama 8

Compilation album by Various Artists
- Released: May 20, 2003
- Genre: Punk rock
- Label: Epitaph
- Producer: Various

Punk-O-Rama chronology
Punk-O-Rama 7 (2002)	Punk-O-Rama 8 (2003)	Punk-O-Rama Vol. 9 (2004)

Professional ratings
Review scores
Source	Rating
AllMusic	link
Punknews.org	link

Punk-O-Rama 8 is the eighth compilation album in the Punk-O-Rama series. It was released in 2003.

This is the only entry in the series to be a two-disc by containing two CDs. The entries following this had two discs, but they were one CD and one DVD.

The song "Quick Death" is on here in two different forms. The first is the original by Transplants, and the latter is a remix of that track by Error.

Disc one

1. "I Am a Revenant" – The Distillers
2. "Don't Call It a Comeback" – Motion City Soundtrack
3. "Trusty Chords" – Hot Water Music
4. "As Wicked" – Rancid
5. "New Day" – The Bouncing Souls
6. "The Greatest Fall (Of All Time)" – Matchbook Romance
7. "The Idiots Are Taking Over" – NOFX
8. "Who We Are" – Bad Religion
9. "Trapped In" – Division of Laura Lee
10. "Sink Venice" – Ikara Colt
11. "Sweating Blood" – F-Minus
12. "Makeshift Patriot" – Sage Francis
13. "A New Morning, Changing Weather" – The (International) Noise Conspiracy
14. "Welfare Problems" – Randy
15. "Thickfreakness" – The Black Keys
16. "Wasted Words" – Death By Stereo
  - Multimedia track

European Version does not include Wasted Words by Death By Stereo, but does include extra tracks:

- Daddy's Little Defect - Sugarcult
- Wish - Beatsteaks
- The Struggle Continues - Looptroop

Disc two

1. "Unstoppable" – Death By Stereo
2. "Coup d'Etat" – Refused
3. "Holiday in the Sun" – Pennywise
4. "Gonna Be a Blackout Tonight" – Dropkick Murphys
5. "Quick Death" – Transplants
6. "Bird Sings Why the Caged I Knows" – Atmosphere
7. "Train of Flesh" – Turbonegro
8. "Incorporeal" – Tiger Army
9. "Bowmore" – Millencolin
10. "The Ocean Song" – Pulley
11. "Contribution" – Guttermouth
12. "Warpath" – Bombshell Rocks
13. "Get This Right!" – Raised Fist
14. "Lose Another Friend" – No Fun at All
15. "Roll Around" – U.S. Bombs
16. "Shattered Faith" – Bad Religion
17. "Quick Death [Remix]" – Error

==== Punk-O-Rama Vol. 9 (2004) ====
Punk-O-Rama Vol. 9

Compilation album by Various Artists
- Released: June 8, 2004
- Genre: Punk rock
- Length: 78:31
- Label: Epitaph
- Producer: Various

Punk-O-Rama chronology
Punk-O-Rama 8 (2003)	Punk-O-Rama Vol. 9 (2004)	Punk-O-Rama 10 (2005)

Professional ratings
Review scores
Source	Rating
AllMusic	link

Punk-O-Rama Vol. 9 is the ninth compilation album in the Punk-O-Rama series.

This is the first of two entries to be released as a two-disc with a DVD. The DVD features current music videos by bands on the CD, with the exception of Randy and Converge who do not appear on the CD. Additionally, of the bands that appear on both the CD and the DVD, only The Bouncing Souls and Matchbook Romance have the same song on each, with "Sing Along Forever" and "Promise" respectively.

All of the tracks on the CD were previously released except "Seein' Diamonds" by Hot Water Music and "The Plague (live)" by Death By Stereo.

This is the only entry in the series not to include a song by NOFX.

This was one of the main albums where the now popular band Motion City Soundtrack first found their fame with the humorous video shown on the DVD.

CD

1. "Social Suicide" – Bad Religion – 1:35
2. "Ride the Wings of Pestilence" – From First to Last – 4:20
3. "Sick Little Suicide" – The Matches – 4:17
4. "The Keys to Life vs. 15 Minutes of Fame" – Atmosphere – 2:40
5. "Now I Know" – Pennywise – 2:57
6. "Throw Down" – Motion City Soundtrack – 3:12
7. "Tropical London" – Rancid – 3:03
8. "The Dirty Glass" – Dropkick Murphys – 3:37
9. "Plea from a Cat Named Virtute" – The Weakerthans – 3:49
10. "Promise" – Matchbook Romance – 4:16
11. "City in the Sea" – Scatter the Ashes – 4:22
12. "Liberation Frequency" – Refused – 4:11
13. "Struck by a Wrecking Ball" – Nekromantix – 3:28
14. "Bad Reputation" – Pulley – 2:53
15. "Fall Apart" – 1208 – 3:08
16. "Sing Along Forever" – The Bouncing Souls – 1:35
17. "Seein' Diamonds" – Hot Water Music – 3:36
18. "Life Goes By" – The Special Goodness – 2:45
19. "Miss Take (radio edit)" – HorrorPops – 3:06
20. "Temptation" – Tiger Army – 2:10
21. "Dirty Love" – Division Of Laura Lee – 3:11
22. "Burn in Hell" – Error – 3:04
23. "Now" – Eyedea & Abilities – 4:21
24. "The Plague (live)" – Death By Stereo – 2:58

DVD

1. "Sing Along Forever" – The Bouncing Souls
2. "Miss Take" – HorrorPops
3. "Trying to Find a Balance" – Atmosphere
4. "Insects Destroy" – Pulley
5. "The Next Big Thing" – 1208
6. "Promise" – Matchbook Romance
7. "The Future Freaks Me Out" – Motion City Soundtrack
8. "Psalm for the Future for the Elks Lodge Last Call" – The Weakerthans
9. "X-Ray Eyes" – Randy
10. "NFA" – The Special Goodness
11. "Heartless" – Converge
12. "Hand in Hand" - Beatsteaks

==== Punk-O-Rama 10 (2005) ====
Punk-O-Rama 10

Compilation album by Various Artists
- Released: June 7, 2005
- Genres: Punk, emo, screamo, pop-punk, hardcore punk, indie, Hip-hop
- Length: 72:23
- Label: Epitaph
- Producer: Various

Punk-O-Rama chronology
Punk-O-Rama Vol. 9 (2004)	Punk-O-Rama 10 (2005)

Professional ratings
Review scores
Source	Rating
AllMusic	link

Punk-O-Rama 10 is the tenth and final compilation album in the Punk-O-Rama series. The following year saw the start of Epitaph Records' new compilation series called Unsound.

This is one of only two, along with the previous entry, to be released as a two-disc with a DVD. The DVD features current music videos by bands on the CD, with the exception of C. Aarme, the Weakerthans, the Black Keys, Atmosphere, Horrorpops and Eyedea & Abilities who do not appear on the CD. Additionally, of the bands that appear on both the CD and the DVD, only the Bouncing Souls and Roger Miret and the Disasters have the same song on each, with "Anchors Aweigh" and "Riot, Riot, Riot" respectively.

Although most of the tracks on the CD were previously released, this entry features more unreleased tracks than any other in the series. "Shoot Me in the Smile" by The Matches, "News From The Front" by Bad Religion (however, the song was a bonus track on certain regional releases of Stranger Than Fiction), "Mixin' Up Adjectives" by This Is Me Smiling, "From the Tops of Trees" by Scatter the Ashes, "Mission from God" by The Offspring, "Bloodstain" by Pulley and "Not the Way" by The Special Goodness" were all previously unreleased as was the live version of "Anchors Aweigh" by The Bouncing Souls. Additionally, "There's No Fun in Fundamentalism" by NOFX made its CD debut here, as it was previously only available on one of the 7" of the Month Club vinyl singles.

CD

1. When "You're" Around – Motion City Soundtrack
2. Lovers & Liars – Matchbook Romance
3. Shoot Me in the Smile – The Matches
4. Failure By Designer Jeans – From First to Last
5. Sun Vs. Moon – Sage Francis
6. News From The Front – Bad Religion
7. Mixin' Up Adjectives – This Is Me Smiling
8. Shadowland – Youth Group
9. From the Tops of Trees – Scatter the Ashes
10. I Need Drugs – Some Girls
11. Mince Meat – Dangerdoom
12. Mission From God – The Offspring
13. Black Cloud – Converge
14. Last Goodbyes – Hot Water Music
15. Anchors Aweigh (Live) – The Bouncing Souls
16. Farewell My Hell – Millencolin
17. The Warrior's Code – Dropkick Murphys
18. Dead Weight Falls – The Unseen
19. White Knuckle Ride – Rancid
20. Falling Down – Pennywise
21. No Fun in Fundamentalism – NOFX
22. Bloodstain – Pulley
23. Not the Way – The Special Goodness
24. Ghostfire – Tiger Army
25. Riot, Riot, Riot – Roger Miret and the Disasters
26. Laugh/Love/Fuck – The Coup

DVD

1. "Ride the Wings of Pestilence" – From First to Last
2. "My Eyes Burn" – Matchbook Romance
3. "Ray" – Millencolin
4. "Skeleton Jar" – Youth Group
5. "Eagles Become Vultures" – Converge
6. "Tu Puta Mi Casa" – C. Aarme
7. "Roses of the Devil's Garden" – Tiger Army
8. "Chain Me Free" – The Matches
9. "Los Angeles Is Burning" – Bad Religion
10. "Ride the Fence" – The Coup
11. "Caesura" – Scatter the Ashes
12. "The Reasons" – The Weakerthans
13. "10 AM Automatic" – The Black Keys
14. "National Disgrace" – Atmosphere
15. "Miss Take" – HorrorPops
16. "Tessie" – Dropkick Murphys
17. "Anchors Aweigh" – The Bouncing Souls
18. "Insects Destroy" – Pulley
19. "Riot Riot Riot" – Roger Miret and the Disasters
20. "Glass" – Eyedea & Abilities
21. "NFA" – The Special Goodness

==== Unsound (2006) ====
Unsound

Compilation album by Various Artists
- Released: June 6, 2006
- Genres: Punk rock, post-hardcore, emo, Hip-hop
- Length: 56:12
- Label: Epitaph
- Producer: Various

Unsound is the first, and currently only, compilation released in the Unsound series, which replaced Epitaph Records' Punk-O-Rama series. Epitaph chose to change the name of the compilation series because the name "Punk-O-Rama", especially in its later releases, no longer reflected the wide range of music released on the compilations. Unsound is similar to the last two entries in the Punk-O-Rama series in that it is a two-disc set with a CD and a DVD, which contains music videos of bands on the CD.

CD

1. "The Latest Plague" – From First to Last – 3:18
2. "Situations" – Escape the Fate – 3:06
3. "Little Maggots" – The Matches – 2:43
4. "Forever Young [Radio Edit]" – Youth Group – 3:24
5. "Attractive Today" – Motion City Soundtrack – 1:41
6. "Surrender" – Matchbook Romance – 4:47
7. "I Am the Wind, You Are the Feather" – Vanna – 3:45
8. "Last Light" – Converge – 3:34
9. "Hot Piss" – Some Girls – 1:03
10. "Pretty People Never Lie, Vampires Never Die" – I Am Ghost – 4:32
11. "Benzie Box" – DANGERDOOM – 3:00
12. "Los Angeles Is Burning" – Bad Religion – 3:21
13. "The Gold Song" – The Bouncing Souls – 3:16
14. "Knocked Down" – Pennywise – 2:43
15. "New Eyes Open" – The Draft – 3:32
16. "The Buzz Kill (Reanimator Remix)" – Sage Francis – 4:45
17. "The Latest Plague (Atticus Remix)" – From First to Last – 3:42

DVD

1. "The Latest Plague" – From First to Last
2. "Monsters" – Matchbook Romance
3. "Hold Me Down" – Motion City Soundtrack
4. "Chain Me Free" – The Matches
5. "Bone Metal" – Some Girls
6. "Shadowland" – Youth Group
7. "Escape Artist" – Sage Francis
8. "A.T.H.F." – Danger Doom
9. "Los Angeles Is Burning" – Bad Religion
10. "You Don't Have to Shout" – The Robocop Kraus

=== DVDs ===
- Punk-O-Rama: The Videos, Volume 1 (2003)
- Punk-O-Rama Vol. 9 (2004) – included with CD release
- Punk-O-Rama 10 (2005) – included with CD release

== Artists ==
A total of 88 artists contributed songs to the Punk-O-Rama compilation series. Pennywise and Rancid were the only acts to appear on all ten volumes, while Bad Religion, NOFX, and Pulley each appeared on nine installments. Scott Radinsky appears on all 10, 1 with Ten Foot Pole and 9 with Pulley.

Contributing artists included:

- 59 Times the Pain
- 98 Mute
- 1208
- Agnostic Front
- All
- Atmosphere
- Bad Religion
- Beatsteaks
- The Black Keys
- Bombshell Rocks
- The Bouncing Souls
- The Business
- C.AARMÉ
- Converge
- The Coup
- The Cramps
- Danger Doom
- Death by Stereo
- Descendents
- Dead Fucking Last
- Deviates
- The Distillers
- Division of Laura Lee
- Down by Law
- Downset
- Dropkick Murphys
- Dwarves
- Error
- Eyedea & Abilities
- F-Minus

- Sage Francis
- From First to Last
- Gas Huffer
- Jack Grisham
- Guttermouth
- H_{2}O
- The Hives
- HorrorPops
- Hot Water Music
- The Humpers
- I Against I
- Ikara Colt
- The (International) Noise Conspiracy
- The Joykiller
- Wayne Kramer
- Madball
- Matchbook Romance
- The Matches
- Me First and the Gimme Gimmes
- Millencolin
- Roger Miret and the Disasters
- Motion City Soundtrack
- Nekromantix
- New Bomb Turks
- No Fun at All
- NOFX
- The Offspring
- Osker
- Pennywise
- Poison Idea

- Pulley
- Raised Fist
- Rancid
- Randy
- Red Aunts
- Refused
- Satanic Surfers
- Scatter the Ashes
- SNFU
- Some Girls
- The Special Goodness
- Straight Faced
- Ten Foot Pole
- This Is Me Smiling
- Tiger Army
- Total Chaos
- Transplants
- T.S.O.L.
- Turbonegro
- Union 13
- The Unseen
- U.S. Bombs
- Vision
- Voodoo Glow Skulls
- Tom Waits
- The Weakerthans
- Youth Group
- Zeke
