= Devout/The Modern Hymn =

Studio album by Scatter the Ashes
- Released: May 25, 2004
- Recorded: 2004
- Genre: Post-hardcore, indie rock, hard rock
- Label: Epitaph
- Producer: John Naclario

Professional ratings
Review scores
Source	Rating
AllMusic	3.5/5 stars
Punknews.org	3.5/5 stars

Devout/The Modern Hymn is an album from punk band Scatter The Ashes. It was released on May 25, 2004.

== Critical reception ==
AllMusic wrote: "Words, melodies, shifting, complex, and syncopated rhythmic structures are wed to adventurous harmonics that are thunderously, chaotically beautiful." Exclaim! wrote that "though slightly too atmospheric and brooding at times, Devout/The Modern Hymn is an impressive debut for a band whose sound is clearly theirs alone."

== Track listing ==
1. "Caesura" – 3:06
2. "City in the Sea" – 4:25
3. "Division" – 3:49
4. "Affinity" – 3:41
5. "Citadel (The New Fall Forest)" – 4:09
6. "Hour Invocation" – 3:25
7. "White Actress" – 4:29
8. "In the Company of Wolves" – 3:03
9. "Christine Daae" – 3:52
10. "Hour Benediction" – 5:43
