= The Hard Stuff =

The Hard Stuff may refer to:

- The Hard Stuff (George Thorogood and the Destroyers album), 2006, or the title song
- The Hard Stuff (Wayne Kramer album), 1995
- "The Hard Stuff", a song by Justin Timberlake from Man of the Woods

== See also ==
- Hard Stuff, an English hard rock group
