= More Songs About Anger, Fear, Sex & Death =

Compilation album
- Released: 1992
- Genre: Punk rock, grunge
- Length: 70:11
- Label: Epitaph
- Producer: Brett Gurewitz, Jack Endino*

The compilation More Songs About Anger, Fear, Sex & Death was released in 1992 through Epitaph Records.

== History and musical style ==
The album was produced and compiled by Brett Gurewitz, guitarist and songwriter of Bad Religion and founder of the independent record label Epitaph in 1981. Other contributors were Donnell Cameron for engineering, since 1988 partner of Gurewitz in the Westbeach Recorders Studio in Hollywood, and Jack Endino, who produced the Songs of Coffin Break in the Reciprocal Recording Studio in Seattle in 1990.

In 1992 Epitaph Records was still a small label with few employees, so in addition to Brett Gurewitz at others Jay Bentley and Jeff Abarta. The compilation contains one or two tracks from every publication released by Epitaph at this time. Besides Bad Religion with NOFX, Pennywise, Down By Law, Dag Nasty and L7 bands are represented who became well known acts of the American punk scene.

The graphic design of the booklet by Joy Aoki was performed using the painting The Horrors of War by Peter Paul Rubens.

== Track listing ==
No.	Band	Title	Length	From Record
1	Bad Religion	Atomic Garden	3:12	Generator (1992); E-86416
2	NOFX	Day To Daze	1:58	S&M Airlines (1989); E-86405
3	Pennywise	Wouldn't It Be Nice	2:07	Pennywise (1991); E-86412
4	Coffin Break	For Beth *	3:20	Crawl (1991); E-86413
5	Dag Nasty	Million Days	3:38	Four on the Floor (1992); E-86415
6	NOFX	Shower Days	2:11	Ribbed (1991); E-86410
7	Bad Religion	No Control	1:46	No Control (1989); E-86406
8	L7	Let's Rock Tonight	3:07	L7 (1988); E-86401
9	Down By Law	Best Friends	3:13	Down by Law (1991); E-86411
10	Bad Religion	Anesthesia	3:00	Against the Grain (1990); E-86409
11	Coffin Break	Crawl *	4:30	Crawl (1991); E-86413
12	NOFX	Beer Bong	2:31	Liberal Animation (1991); E-86417
13	Dag Nasty	SFS	2:52	Four on the Floor (1992); E-86415
14	Pennywise	Living For Today	3:08	Pennywise (1991); E-86412
15	Bad Religion	Faith Alone	3:34	Against the Grain (1990); E-86409
16	Little Kings	Head First	2:00	Head First (1989); E-86403
17	NOFX	Professional Crastination	2:46	S&M Airlines (1989); E-86405
18	Bad Religion	I Want To Conquer The World	2:18	No Control (1989); E-86406
19	L7	Bite The Wax Tadpole	2:15	L7 (1988); E-86401
20	NOFX	New Boobs	3:26	Ribbed (1991); E-86410
21	Bad Religion	You Are The Government	1:22	Suffer (1988); E-86404
22	Insted	No Rules	1:57	What We Believe (1990); E-86408
23	NOFX	I Live In A Cake	1:09	Liberal Animation (1991); E-86417
24	Down By Law	Down The Drain	2:38	Down by Law (1991); E-86411
25	Bad Religion	The Answer	3:23	Generator (1992); E-86416
26	Bad Religion	Fuck Armageddon	2:50	80–85 (1991); E-86416

*) produced by Jack Endino in the Reciprocal Studio Seattle

== See also ==
- Epitaph Records discography
