= The Muslims =

American punk-rock band

- Origin: Durham, North Carolina, US
- Genres: Punk rock
- Years active: 2017–present
- Label: Epitaph
- Members: QADR (lead singer, guitarist); Ba7ba7 (drummer); Abu Shea (bassist)
- Website: themuslims.com

The Muslims are an American punk-rock band from Durham, North Carolina.

== History ==
The band was founded in 2017 as a reaction to the election of Donald Trump by lead singer and guitarist QADR, drummer Ba7ba7, and bassist Abu Shea.

QADR and Ba7ba7 had previously played together in a Greensboro-based protest band called Cakalak Thunder. The Muslims played their first show in a shed in North Carolina and have been "featured on NPR, Afropunk, Buzzfeed, The Guardian, PunkBlack, Dying Scene and more." QADR has named being inspired by "Black artists such as Bobby Hackney Sr. (Death), Nina Simone, Jimi Hendrix, and Poly Styrene (X-Ray Spex)" for their songwriting.

Since their first show, The Muslims have since accumulated over 3 million streams across Spotify, YouTube and SoundCloud.

== Discography ==
Albums

- The Muslims (2018)
- Mayo Supreme (2019)
- Gentrified Chicken (2020)
- Inshallah: Tomorrow We Inherit the Earth (2020)
- Fuck These Fuckin Fascists (2021)
