= Dangerous! =

Punk band from Australia

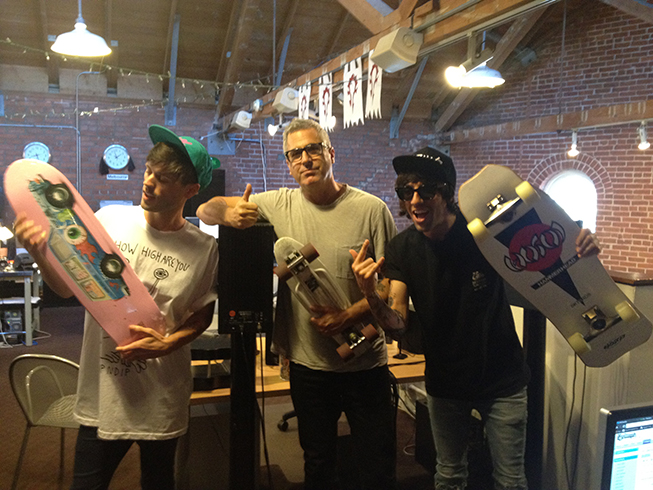
From left: Nicky Jones, Brett Gurewitz & Jarrad Lee at Epitaph Records, Los Angeles, CA. November 2013

Dangerous! are a punk band from Australia comprising Nicky Jones and Jarrad Lee. The band's early work was predominantly garage indie punk rock. Their debut LP, Teenage Rampage was released in 2011 on Epitaph Records and earned them the title of the "Hottest New Band of the Year". Dangerous! was the only Australian act to sign to Epitaph for worldwide distribution.

The band followed this release with a string of festival appearances throughout Europe and the US, including the Sonisphere Festival, Download, Big Day Out, and Pyramid Rock.

== Discography ==
=== Albums and tracks ===
- Winter/Spring Sampler (2011, Epitaph Records)
- Teenage Rampage (2011, Epitaph Records)
- Nirvana Nevermind Forever ("Endless, Nameless") (2012, Kerrang! Magazine)

=== Singles ===
- "Not One of You"
- "Movers N Shakers" featured on MTV Rob Dyrdek's Fantasy Factory and debuted on UK BBC Radio 1
- "Big Muff"
