= Breakkaway =

American alternative metal band

breakkaway
- Origin: New York City, U.S.
- Genres: Alternative pop; post-rock; alternative metal
- Years active: 2022–present
- Label: Epitaph
- Members: Jessica Li; Case Fadell; Jorge Gonzalez Diez Gutierrez; Romain Dammann; Ethan Chan
- Past members: Tomomi "Toji" Kimura
- Website: breakkaway.com

Breakkaway (stylized in lower case, and previously as breakk.away) is an American alternative rock band from New York City, formed in 2022.

== History ==
Breakkaway was formed in 2022, having first met in high school in 2021. The band members are from Canada, Mexico, and France and are currently based in New York City. They released their debut single, titled "I'll See You When the Night Comes", in May 2023.

In March 2026, the band signed to Epitaph Records and released the single "Portrait Set on Fire", co-produced by former Sleep Token producer George Lever. On May 20, the band released the single "Run Away with Me". On October 15, the band released the single "I Know", featuring Softcult, and announced their debut extended play. On November 13, Breakkaway released their first EP titled It All Feels the Same from Afar.

== Musical style and influences ==
Breakkaway's style has been described as alternative pop, alternative metal and post-rock. The band has been compared to artists such as Pvris, Sleep Token, Spiritbox, Evanescence, and A Perfect Circle. The band has cited Florence and the Machine, Spiritbox, Sophie, Arca, Rosalía, Darko US, and Vildhjarta as influences.

== Band members ==
Current

- Jessica Li – lead vocals (2022–present)
- Case Fadell – guitar (2022–present), drums (2022–2025), bass (2026–present)
- Jorge Gonzalez Diez Gutierrez – keyboards, piano (2022–present), backing vocals (2025–present)
- Romain Dammann – guitar (2023–present)
- Ethan Chan – drums (2025–present)

Former

- Tomomi "Toji" Kimura – bass (2022–2026)

== Discography ==
=== Extended plays ===
List of extended plays
Title	EP details
It All Feels the Same from Afar	Released: November 13, 2026; Label: Epitaph

=== Singles ===
List of singles
Title	Year	Album
"I'll See You When the Night Comes"	2023	Non-album singles
"Outside"	2023	Non-album singles
"Secret"	2024	Non-album singles
"Portrait Set on Fire"	2026	It All Feels the Same from Afar
"Run Away with Me"	2026	It All Feels the Same from Afar
"I Know" (featuring Softcult)	2026	It All Feels the Same from Afar
