= Plague Vendor =

American punk rock band

- Origin: Whittier, California
- Genres: Punk rock
- Years active: 2008–present
- Labels: Epitaph
- Members: Brandon Blaine; Henri Cash; Jay Rogers; Michael Perez; Luke Perine

Plague Vendor is an American punk rock band formed in 2008 in Whittier, California.

The band's punk rock style incorporates elements of post-punk, and post-hardcore.

== History ==
Plague Vendor was formed in 2008, originating from a shared passion for punk rock among its members. Growing up in Whittier, a conservative exurb, they were inspired by the punk scenes of Los Angeles and other areas.

In 2014, Plague Vendor signed with Epitaph Records and released their debut album, Free to Eat. The same year, they were included on as one of AP's "100 Bands You Need to Know".

Their sophomore album, Bloodsweat, produced by Stuart Sikes, was released in 2016, further developing their signature sound. In 2019, they released their third album, By Night, produced by John Congleton, which incorporated elements of synth and electronic drums while maintaining their punk roots.

Plague Vendor describe their sound as "Graveyard Groove": dark, yet danceable.

== Members ==
- Brandon Blaine – lead vocals
- Henri Cash – lead guitar
- Jay Rogers – rhythm guitar
- Michael Perez – bass
- Luke Perine – drums, percussion

== Discography ==
=== Albums ===
- Free To Eat (2014)
- BLOODSWEAT (2016)
- By Night (2019)

=== Singles ===
- Black Sap Scriptures (2014)
- Isua (2016)
- Ox Blood (2016)
