= Dead Fucking Last =

American punk rock band

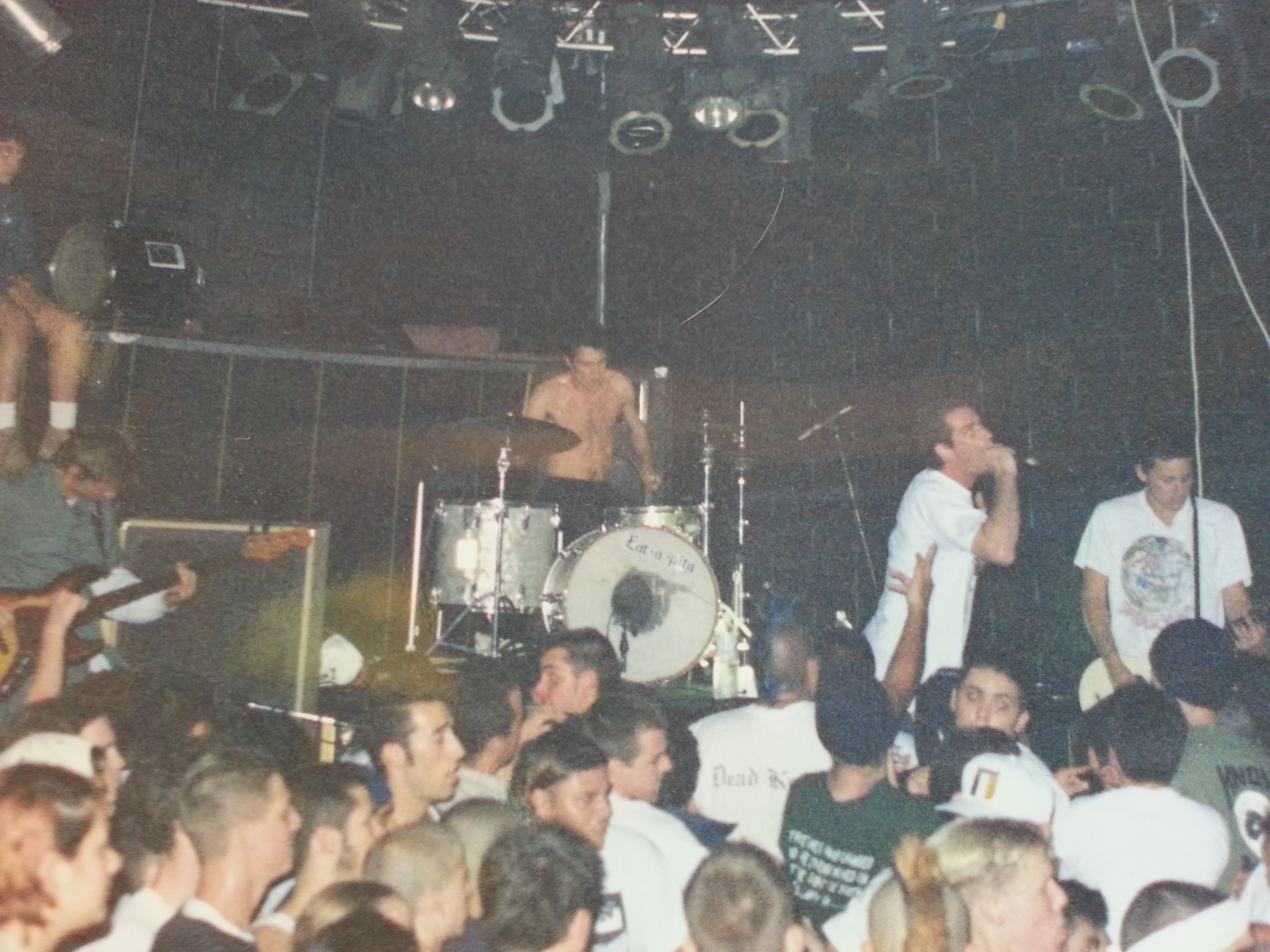
- DFL at the Showcase Theater, 1996

Background information
- Origin: Los Angeles, California
- Genres: Hardcore punk, punk rock, skate punk
- Years active: 1991–1997, 2013–present
- Labels: Grand Royal; Epitaph; Burger; SBÄM; Say-10; Trust Records
- Members: Crazy Tom; Monty Messex; Jordan Jacques; Patrick Sullivan
- Past members: Adam "Ad-Rock" Horovitz; Michael "Mike D" Diamond; Tony Converse; Chris "Wag" Wagner; Eugene Gore; Brian Baker; Josh Lingenfelter; Amery "AWOL" Smith; Tom Barta; Nick "Bigg Nick" Treviṅo; Nick Manning; Edgar Jaramilo; Adam Gardner
- Website: www.facebook.com/proudtobedfl

Dead Fucking Last (also known as DFL) is an American punk rock band that was founded in 1991 in Los Angeles, California by Tom Davis, Monty Messex, Adam (Ad-Rock) Horovitz and Tony Converse.

== History ==
=== Grand Royal Records ===
DFL was founded in 1991 by Tom "Crazy Tom" Davis, Monty "Monte" Messex, Adam "Ad-Rock" Horovitz and Tony Converse. Michael "Mike D" Diamond, played drums briefly in DFL’s earliest incarnation.

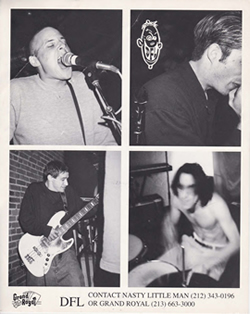

DFL’s first release My Crazy Life was recorded at the Beastie Boys' G-Son Studios in Atwater Village on April 22, 1993. It was recorded by Beastie Boys producer Mario Caldato Jr (Mario C) and was released in 1993 on Grand Royal Records on 7" vinyl and CD. Spike Jonze shot the photographs for the vinyl release.

DFL’s bass and drum line-up went through a number of changes between 1993 and 1994. Tony Converse left the band and was replaced on drums by Amery "AWOL" Smith, of Suicidal Tendencies and the Beastie Boys. Tony rejoined DFL in 1994. Chris "Wag" Wagner, bass player for Mary's Danish, played with DFL briefly in 1993. As did Eugene Gore, violinist on the Beastie Boys Ill Communication release. Brian Baker of Minor Threat and Bad Religion, also played bass briefly during this time. In 1994, Tom Barta joined DFL on bass until the band broke up in 1997.

=== Epitaph Records ===
In 1994 DFL signed a recording contract with Epitaph Records. In 1995 DFL released their second studio album Proud to Be.

Proud to Be was recorded at G-Son Studios and was produced by Adam Horovitz and Mario C. Proud to Be was released on 7" vinyl as Tony’s War. DFL released one video from Proud to Be for the song "Home is Where the Heart Is". DFL toured with Pennywise, Biohazard, Slayer, 7 Seconds, Sick of It All and Sublime, among others.

DFL recorded two songs for a series of compilations: one for Punk-O-Rama Vol. 2 called "ThoughtControl" and one for Generations I – A Punk Look at Human Rights called "Health Care for All Americans."

In 1997 DFL released their third full-length studio album, Grateful The album was recorded and produced by DFL at New Belleview Studios. Grateful included an instrumental track by Girl pro-skateboarder Paulo Diaz. Grateful was released on cassette tape as The Tape Show. The Tape Show included Grateful outtakes and alternate tracks, plus fan covers of DFL songs and other ephemera. After Grateful’s completion, DFL toured Brazil and Argentina. In April 1997 DFL broke up.

=== Hiatus ===
In 2009 Tom Davis, skateboard icon Tony Alva and Amery "AWOL" Smith started the hardcore punk band General Fucking Principle (also known as GFP). Nick "Bigg Nick" Treviṅo played guitar from 2009-2010. In 2011, Greg Hetson of the Circle Jerks and Bad Religion joined GFP on guitar. GFP recorded material with Beastie Boys producer Maria Caldato Jr. that was released in Germany, called "Best at its Worst" - a 12" split with Scheisse Minnelli.

In 1999 Monty Messex started a punk/hardcore band called The Family Dog. The Family Dog played in the same genre as DFL. In 2000 the Family Dog released "So Cal Hardcore" on the Voodoo Glow Skulls' El Pocho Loco label. He also recorded acoustically under the name Montgomery Messex, releasing music for the David Lynch Foundation's Transcend Music Label in 2013.

Tony Converse went on to play drums in the hardcore band Massengil. Massengil provided a track on DFL's Epitaph release Grateful.

=== Reunion ===
In 2013 Tom Davis and Monty Messex reunited DFL. Nick Manning of Circle One and Final Conflict was recruited to play drums with Nick "Bigg Nick" Treviṅo on bass. Bigg Nick quit DFL in 2016 due to internal differences. David "Whitey" Andrews, from The Family Dog, covered bass while DFL looked for a permanent member. In 2017, Edgar Jaramillo from Union13 was recruited to play bass.

In 2015 Epitaph Records (vinyl) and Burger Records (cassette) released a 20th anniversary reissue of Proud to Be. Vinyl was issued in 12" black and translucent green, and also included two digital download "bonus" tracks: "Follow the Leader" and "Decisions". The bonus tracks were previously released as a promotional flexi-disc in a 1995 edition of Strength Magazine. The reissue was met with positive reviews by Punknews.org and Noisey.

In 2016 DFL recorded their first new song titled "Shut It Down" in 19 years. The song is included on the Punknews.org release "Banned From the P.C. Mixtape." In 2016, a member of DFL bought the rights and master recordings of their first release My Crazy Life from GR2 Records.

In 2016-2017, DFL recorded a 7 song EP titled "YRUDFL" produced by Greg Hetson. The EP was co-released by SBAM Records and Say-10 Records on August 27, 2021.

== Band members ==
Current members

- Tom Davis – vocals (1991–1997, 2013–present)
- Monty Messex – guitar and vocals (1991–1997, 2013–present)
- Jordan Jacques – drums (2021–present)
- Patrick Sullivan – bass (2021–present)

Past members

- Adam Horovitz – bass (1991 – 1993)
- Michael Diamond – drums (1991)
- Tony Converse – drums (1991–1993, 1994–1997)
- Chris Wagner – bass (1993)
- Eugene Gore – bass (1993)
- Brian Baker – bass (1993)
- Josh Lingenfelter – bass (1993)
- Amery Smith – drums (1993)
- Tom Barta – bass (1994–1997)
- Nick Treviṅo – bass (2013–2016)
- David Andrews - bass (2016)
- Nick Manning – drums (2013–2018)
- Edgar Jaramillo – bass (2016–2021)
- Adam Gardner - drums (2018-2021)

== Discography ==
=== Studio albums ===
- My Crazy Life – Grand Royal Records, 1993 (7", Cassette, and CD)
- Dead Fucking Last - Grand Royal Records, 1993 (7")
- Hurricane/DFL – America’s Most Hardcore - Grand Royal Records, 1994 (10" and CD)
- Proud to Be - Epitaph Records, 1995 (CD)
- Tony’s War – Epitaph Records, 1995 (double 7")
- Grateful - Epitaph Records, 1997 (CD)
- The Tape Show (cassette) – Epitaph Records, 1997 (Cassette)
- Proud to Be/20th Anniversary Reissue (vinyl) - Epitaph Records, 2015
- Proud to Be/20th Anniversary Reissue (Cassette) - Burger Records, 2015
- The Tape Show/20th Anniversary Reissue (Cassette) - Burger Records, 2017
- "YRUDFL" - SBAM Records/Say-10 Records, 2021 (Vinyl, EP)
- Fuck It - SBAM Records, 2026 (LP)

=== Compilations ===
- Grand Royal - Mixed Drink, Volume 2 - Grand Royal Records, 1995
- Punk-O-Rama Vol. 2 – Epitaph Records, 1996
- Generations I – A Punk Look at Human Rights - Ark 21 Records, 1997
- Eventually Everybody Gets an Epitaph - Epitaph Records, 1997
- Banned from the P.C. Mixtape - Punknews.org, 2016
- Slabratory Clothing - Sick Slabs of Sonic Sound 2, 2018
