= Scared Straight (album) =

Studio album by New Bomb Turks
- Released: 1996
- Studios: 609 (Cleveland, Ohio)
- Genre: Rock 'n' roll
- Label: Epitaph
- Producer: New Bomb Turks

New Bomb Turks chronology
| Pissing Out the Poison: Singles & Other Swill... (1995) | Scared Straight (1996) | At Rope's End (1998) |

Scared Straight is an album by the American band New Bomb Turks, released in 1996. It was the band's first album to be released in Canada. New Bomb Turks promoted the album with a North American tour.

== Production ==
Produced by the band, the album was recorded at 609 Recording, in Cleveland; New Bomb Turks had more time to spend in the studio. The band added keyboards, piano, and horns to some of the album's tracks. The lyrics were written by singer Eric Davidson, who took care to contrast the raucous music with reflective or ironic lines.

== Critical reception ==
Professional ratings
Review scores
| Source | Rating |
|---|---|
| AllMusic | 4/5 stars |
| Daily Breeze | 3/4 stars |
| The Encyclopedia of Popular Music | 4/5 stars |
| Entertainment Weekly | A− |
| MusicHound Rock: The Essential Album Guide | 3/5 stars |

Entertainment Weekly wrote that "the New Bomb Turks really are special—and smart enough to know that throwing a bit of Stonesy raunch into their post-hardcore mix on Scared Straight is no crime." The Austin Chronicle concluded that, "though all [their songs] boil with ripened punk-rock pugnaciousness, the ones that really get you going are the ones that make fists clench and pulses race." The Chicago Tribune called the album "pure, breakneck rock 'n' roll."

The Cleveland Scene determined that Scared Straight "comes off like Rocket from the Crypt backing Iggy Pop—horns and organ temper the rugged guitar workouts with distorted doses of rock and roll soul." The Austin American-Statesman noted that "the New Bomb Turks are obviously into the 1960s-biker-clamdiggers-dancing-on-tabletops-boys-with-big-greasy-hair thing, but they do it one better, with a miraculously fat guitar tone and tight arrangements." The Columbus Dispatch thought that "the manic, rockabilly-tinged rocker 'Professional Againster' and the fuzz-guitar blast of 'Jukebox Lean' are reminiscent of the Stooges' '1969'."

AllMusic wrote that "the Turks' revivalism would be tiring if it wasn't for their amateurish enthusiasm and their goofy, off-the-wall sense of humor."

== Track listing ==
| No. | Title | Length |
|---|---|---|
| 1. | "Hammerless Nail" |
| 2. | "Bachelor's High" |
| 3. | "Professional Againster" |
| 4. | "Cultural Elite Sign-Up Sheet" |
| 5. | "Jukebox Lean" |
| 6. | "Jeers of a Clown" |
| 7. | "Look Alive Jive" |
| 8. | "Staring Down the Gift Horse" |
| 9. | "Shoot the Offshoot" |
| 10. | "Drop What You're Doin'" |
| 11. | "Telephone Number" |
| 12. | "Wrest Your Hands" |

== Personnel ==
- Eric Davidson – vocals
- Jim Weber – guitar
- Matt Reber – bass guitar
- Bill Randt – drums
- Brian Casey – trombone
- Derek DiCenzo – organ

Production

- New Bomb Turks – producer
- Don Depew – engineer
