= The Robocop Kraus =

German rock band

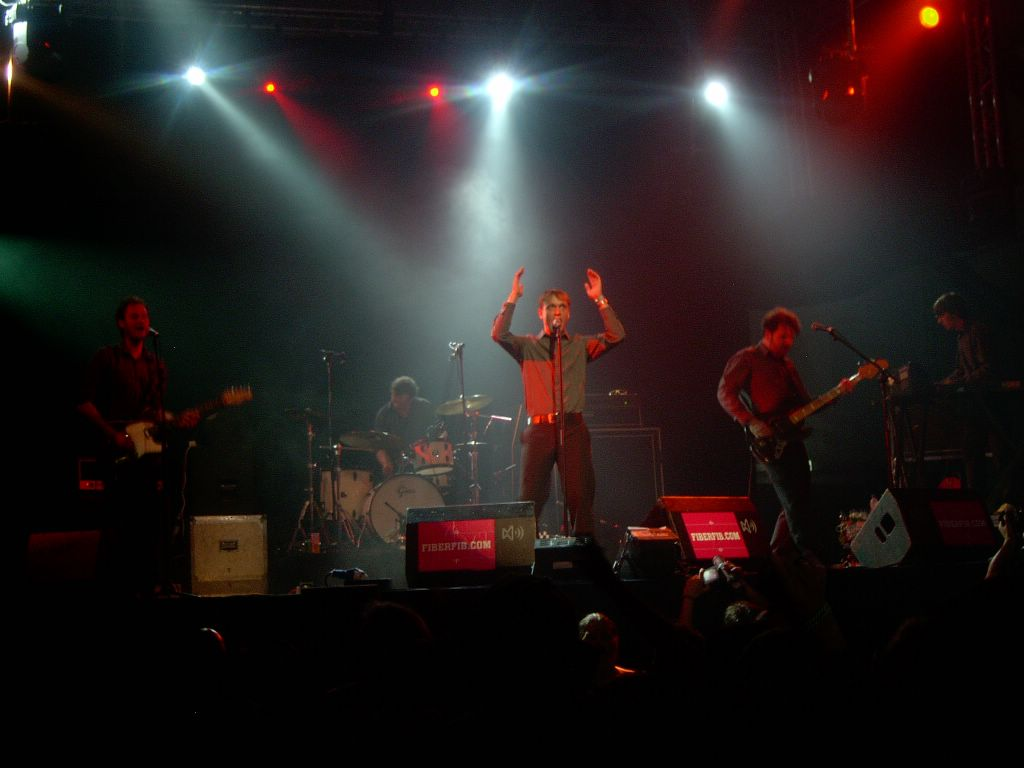
- The Robocop Kraus

Background information
- Origin: Nuremberg, Germany
- Genres: Indie rock, Indie pop, Post-punk revival
- Years active: 1998–present
- Labels: Swing Deluxe; L'Age D'Or; Epitaph; ANTI-
- Members: Thomas Lang - vocals, guitar Matthias Wendl - guitar Tobias Helmlinger – bass Markus Steckert – organ, keyboards Hans Christian Fuss - drums, guitar Johannes Uschalt - drums, guitar
- Past members: Robin Van Velzen; Roman Maul; Peter Tiedeken
- Website: www.therobocopkraus.de

The Robocop Kraus are a post-punk revival and indie rock band from Nuremberg, Germany.

== History ==
The Robocop Kraus formed in 1998 with Thomas Lang as lead singer and on guitar, Matthias Wendl on guitar, Johannes Uschalt on drums, and Roman Maul on bass. Maul left before the release of a split EP with The Cherryville on Swing Deluxe records, Lang and Uschalt's record company. Tobias Helmlinger replaced Maul on bass and Markus Steckert joined in on keyboards and organ. After touring with Yage, The Robocop Kraus followed their split EP with The Cherryville up with their first full-length album in 1999 entitled Inferno Nihilistique 2000, again, on Swing Deluxe. The band toured Germany, France, and Spain in support of Inferno Nihilistique 2000.

In 2001, the band released their second album and first worldwide release Tiger on Day After Records, a Czech record label. They toured in support of Tiger throughout Germany, France, Holland, the Czech Republic, Poland, England, and Ireland with The World/Inferno Friendship Society and Yage. A year later, The Robocop Kraus released As Long As We Dance We Are Not Dead, a two CD collection of rarities including songs from The Robocop Kraus/The Cherryville split EP. They hooked up with The World/Inferno Friendship Society and The Independents once more for a US tour and followed that up with another tour across Japan in 2002.

2003 saw the release of their third album Living With Other People on L'Âge d'or.

After Hans Christian Fuss replaced Johannes Uschalt on drums, The Robocop Kraus began recording their fourth studio album They Think They Are The Robocop Kraus in February 2005 at Grōndahl Studios with Pelle Gunnerfeldt. They released They Think They Are The Robocop Kraus in Germany on 20 June 2005, followed by a European wide release on 5 September 2005.

In February 2006, They Think They Are The Robocop Kraus was released in the US and The Robocop Kraus went on tour with Art Brut in support of this album.

== Discography ==
=== Studio albums ===
- 1999 Inferno Nihilistique 2000 on Swing Deluxe
- 2001 Tiger on Day After Records
- 2002 As Long As We Dance We Are Not Dead on Swing Deluxe (Rarities)
- 2003 Living With Other People on L'Âge d'or and Day After Records
- 2005 They Think They Are The Robocop Kraus on L'Âge d'or and Epitaph
- 2007 Blunders and Mistakes on ANTI- and Epitaph

=== EPs ===
- 1998 The Robocop Kraus/The Cherryville on Swing Deluxe
- 2003 Fake Boys 12" on L'Âge d'or and Day After Records
- 2003 Fashion on L'Âge d'or
- 2005 Who Do They Think They Are on L'Âge d'or
- 2009 Metabolismus Maximus on Altin Village

=== Compilation album appearances ===
- 2000 Achtung Autobahn on Swing Deluxe (features "Poor Soul Relax")
