= Osker =

American punk trio, 1990s to 2002

Osker was an American punk rock trio based in Los Angeles, California, active in the late 1990s and early 2000s. They were signed to Epitaph Records until their breakup in 2002.

== Career ==
The band was formed in 1998 by singer and guitarist Devon Williams, then a high school sophomore, with bassist Dave Benitez; a demo recording reached Epitaph Records, which signed the band, and drummer Phil Drazik joined the lineup ahead of the recording ofTreatment 5.

Osker released their debut album, Treatment 5, in 2000. It received a three-star review from AllMusic, which described the release as "aggressive punk with unhinged, snotty vocals and lyrics that alternate between goofy humor and angst-filled catharsis."

In 2001, the group released their second and final studio album, Idle Will Kill. That same year, the group appeared in the movie Crazy/Beautiful, performing the songs "Fuck Me" and "Alright" from Treatment 5. The song "Alright" appeared on the soundtrack for the film.

Following Osker's disbandment in 2002 frontman Devon Williams remained active in music, playing guitar in Lavender Diamond and releasing his debut solo album, Carefree, in 2008.

== Band members ==
- Devon Williams - guitar, lead vocals (1998-2002)
- David Benitez - bass, backing vocals (1998-2002)
- Phil Drazic - drums (2000-2001)
- William Tyler "Ty" Smith - drums (2001; session only)
- Kelly Kusumoto - drums (2001-2002)

== Discography ==
=== Studio albums ===
- Treatment 5 (February 8, 2000)
- Idle Will Kill (June 5, 2001)

=== Split releases ===
- "Osker/Blindsided" (1998)
