= Scatter the Ashes =

American band

- Origin: Nashville, Tennessee, United States
- Genres: Post-punk, gothic rock
- Years active: 2001–2006
- Label: Epitaph Records
- Past members: Daryl Stamps; Dillon Napier; Matt McChord; James Robert Farmer; Ryan Johnson; DJ Savage; Thad; Anthony
- Website: Official Website

Scatter the Ashes was an American post-punk band signed to the Epitaph label. They were formed in the summer of 2001 and played their first show on June 24, 2001, at the Plunge in Nashville. In 2006, they officially broke up, and two of the four members of the group went on to form a new band, MOTHER/FATHER. Demos for their unreleased second album appeared on guiltypeople.org in May 2011.

== Members ==
- Daryl Stamps - Vocal melodies
- James Robert Farmer a.k.a. "Bob" - Guitars
- Matt McChord - Bass
- Dillon Napier - Drums (formally of Point of You? and Second Childhood)
- DJ Savage - DJ and Sound FX
- Thaddeus Sparkman - Guitar
- Ryan Johnson - Guitar (formally of Disposed)
- Anthony Lillie - Percussion

== Discography ==
- Devout / The Modern Hymn (2004, Epitaph Records)
- Construct Set (2005, Epitaph Records)

== Compilations ==
- Punk-O-Rama Vol. 9
- Punk-O-Rama Vol. 10
