= Terrorgruppe =

German punk rock band

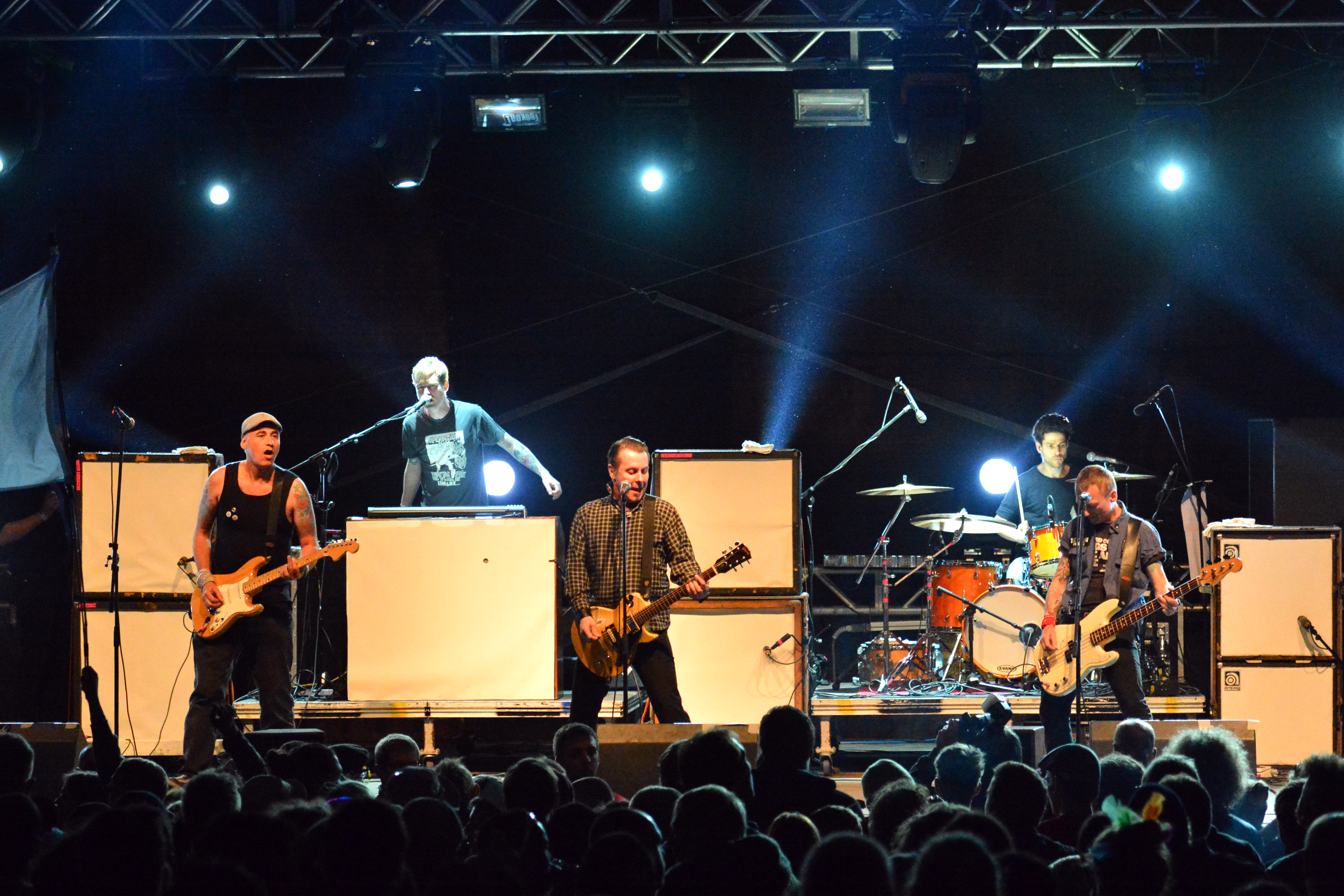
- Terrorgruppe performing in 2014

Background information
- Origin: Berlin, Germany
- Genres: Punk rock
- Years active: 1993–2005; 2013–2022
- Members: Archi Alert (guitar, vocals), Johnny Bottrop (guitar), Kid Katze (drums), Eros Razorblade (multiple instruments)
- Past members: Hermann Hinten (drums), Ice Tüte (bass), Fritz Spritze (bass), Zip Schlitzer (bass), Slash Vicious (bass), Steve Maschine West (drums)
- Website: terrorgruppe.com

Terrorgruppe (German pronunciation: [ˈtɛʁɔɐ̯ɡʁʊpə]) is a German punk rock band from Berlin-Kreuzberg founded in February 1993. The band writes lyrics in German, and their music is usually categorized as fun-punk ('punk pathetique' or 'pret-punk'). Their lyrics address social and political themes on occasion; for example in the song "Kinderwahnsinn" they discuss the idea of zero population growth, and in the song "Neulich Nacht" they address the topics of homosexuality and homophobia. Their lyrics are also against right-wing extremism, a common theme for many German punk bands. Terrorgruppe is known for live performances involving on-stage gags and audience participation. They played at the Chaostage in Hannover in 1995, and wrote the song "Wochenendticket" about the experience.

== History ==
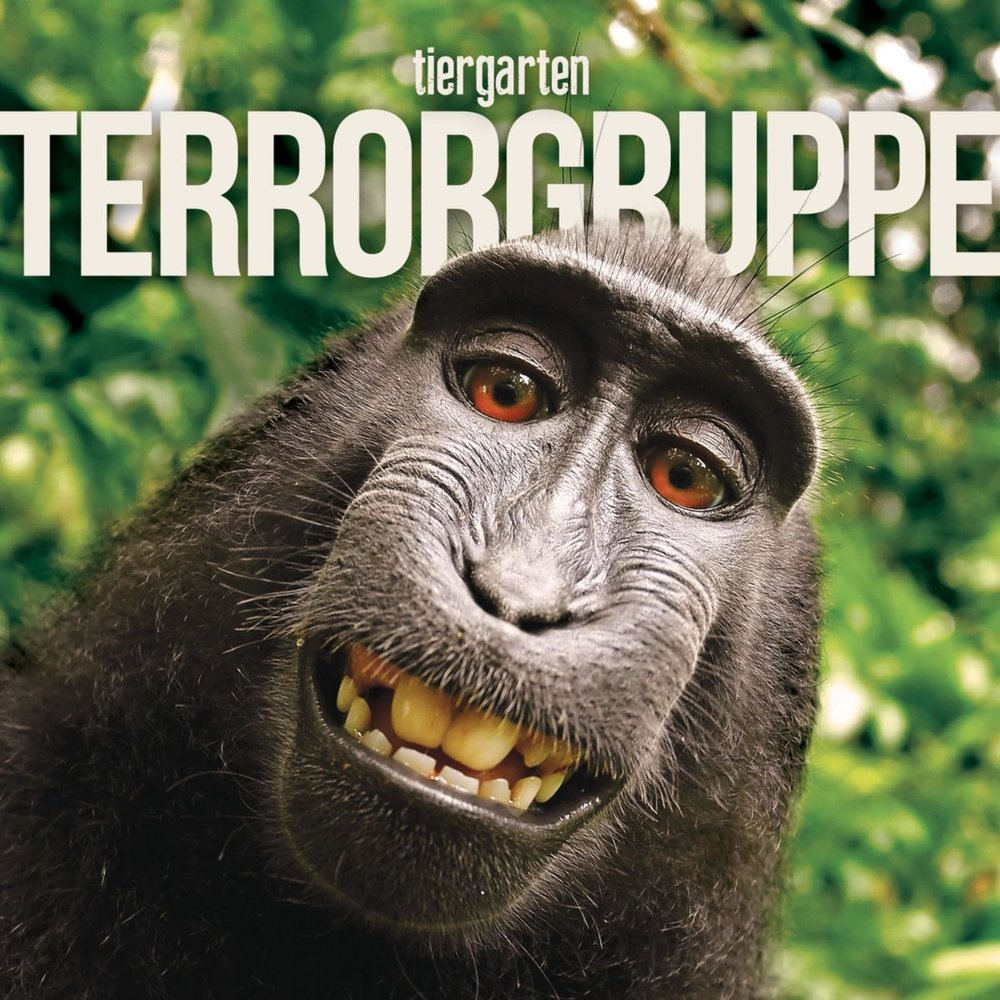
Cover artwork for Terrorgruppe's 2016 album Tiergarten.

The band split up for the first time in 2005 because they disagreed about future artistic directions. They reunited in 2013 after collaborating on the DVD project "Sündige Säuglinge hinter Klostermauern zur Lust verdammt!“, a documentary on the group. In January, 2016 the band released a new album Tiergarten ("Zoo"). As the cover image they used a selfie that a macaque had taken. This album was the first Terrorgruppe album to be listed in the charts in Germany and Austria.

Terrorgruppe's next two albums were also in the charts: the live-album Superblechdose (2017), and the new album Jenseits von Gut und Böse (2020). The group decided this final album would be their last, and they planned to support it with a tour in 2020. Because of the covid pandemic in 2020, this tour was delayed until the end of 2021. In 2021 the on-going tour had to be cancelled after four members of the tour crew tested positive for covid. In 2022, Terrorgruppe did a short tour with six concerts. Shortly before this tour began, bass player Zip Schlitzer died. The band's final concert took place on July 21, 2022 in Huxleys Neuer Welt in Berlin.

== Discography ==
=== Studio albums ===
1. Musik für Arschlöcher CD (1995, Gringo/Metronome) LP (Teenage Rebell)
2. Melodien für Milliarden CD (1996, Gringo) LP (Teenage Rebell)
3. 15 Punkcerialien LP (1997, Gringo/Alternation)
4. Keiner hilft euch LP (1998, Gringo Records)
5. Über Amerika CD (1999, Byo (Cargo Records))
6. 1 World 0 Future (2000, Epitaph Records)
7. Fundamental (2003, Destiny/Aggropop)
8. Rust in Pieces (2006, Destiny/Aggropop)
9. Tiergarten (2016, Destiny/Aggropop)
10. Jenseits von Gut und Böse (2020, Destiny/Aggropop)
11. 1 World 0 Future (2023, Epitaph Records) re-release with 11 bonus tracks

=== Singles and EPs ===
1. "Dem deutschen Volke" (7-inch / 1993)
2. "Arbeit" (7-inch / 1994) (Work)
3. "Fickparty 2000 zur Lust verdammt" (7-inch / 1994)
4. "Die Gesellschaft ist Schuld" (split 7-inch / 1994)
5. "Keine Airbags für die CSU!" (MCD / 1995)
6. "Kinderwahnsinn"(MCD / 1995)
7. "Kreuzberg zuerst" (MCD / 1995)
8. "Der Rhein ist tot" (MCD / 1996)
9. "Wochenendticket" (MCD / 1996)
10. "Rockgiganten vs. Strassenköter" (split single / 1996)
11. Musik für Leute wo gern trinken Pipi EP (1996, Teenage Rebell)
12. "Sretni smo mi svi .. EP" (Split-7″ mit Mars Moles / 1997)
13. "Mein Skateboard ist wichtiger als Deutschland" (MCD / 1997)
14. "Wir müssen raus" (MCD / 1997)
15. "Neulich Nacht" (MCD / 1998)
16. "Mommy-EP" (MCD / 1999)
17. Allein gegen Alle 7-inch (2000, Epitaph Records)
18. "Stay Away from the Good Guys" (MCD, 7-inch / 2000)
19. "Tresenlied" (MCD / 2001)
20. "Dee Dee Ramone / Terrorgruppe" (split single, 10-inch/MCD / 2002)
21. "Angela" (MCD / 2003)
22. "Fischertechnik" (SCD / 2004)
23. "Bananenrepubklik" (7-inch / 2004)
24. Inzest im Familiengrab EP (2014, Destiny/Aggropop)

=== Live albums ===
1. Terrorgruppe Live (1994)
2. Blechdose (2002, Destiny/Aggropop)
3. Superblechdose (2017, Destiny/Aggropop)
4. Erbrochenes (Rares & Reste 1993 - 2020) (2022, Aggropop)

=== Compilations and Samplers (selected) ===
1. Schlachtrufe BRD III (Snake Records, 1994)
2. Schlachtrufe BRD IV (Snake Records, 1995)
3. Deutschpunk - Kampflieder II (Aggressive Rockproduktionen, 1998)
4. Punk Rock BRD Volume 1 (Weird System, 2003)
5. Schlachtrufe BRD VII (Nix Gut Records, 2004)
6. Punk Rock BRD Volume 2 (Weird System, 2004)
7. Nonstop Aggropop 1977–97 (Gringo Records, 2004)
8. Schöne Scheisse (Destiny/Aggropop, 2004)
9. Nachtisch – Halbstark in Kreuzberg 1993–2006 (Destiny, 2013)
10. Dem Deutschen Volke – Singles 1993–1994 (Plastic Bomb Records, 2013)
11. Aggropunk Volume 1+2+3 (Aggressive Punk Produktionen, 2014)
12. Aggropunk Volume 4 - Harte Zeiten (Aggressive Punk Produktionen, 2019)
