= S&M Airlines =

Studio album by NOFX
- Released: September 5, 1989
- Recorded: March 1989
- Studio: Westbeach Recorders in Hollywood
- Genre: Hardcore punk
- Length: 33:42
- Label: Epitaph
- Producer: Brett Gurewitz

NOFX chronology
Liberal Animation (1988)	S&M Airlines (1989)	Maximum Rocknroll (1989)

Professional ratings
Review scores
Source	Rating
AllMusic	1.5/5 stars

S&M Airlines is the second studio album by the American punk rock band NOFX. It was released on September 5, 1989, through Epitaph Records. It was the group's first release on Epitaph. A music video was made for the title track. The album was recorded and mixed in only six days at Westbeach Recorders. Bad Religion's Greg Graffin and Brett Gurewitz (who also produced the album and is the founder of Epitaph) appear on the final track, a cover of the Fleetwood Mac song "Go Your Own Way". They also did harmonies on a few other songs. Bassist/singer, Fat Mike considers it to be the first real NOFX album. It was heavily inspired by Bad Religion and Rich Kids on LSD, and showed the band moving more towards a melodic and metallic sound. The album sold 3,500 copies upon its release.

== Track listing ==
All tracks are written by Fat Mike, except where noted.

No.	Title	Writer(s)	Length
1.	"Day to Daze"	Fat Mike; Eric Melvin	1:58
2.	"Five Feet Under"		2:42
3.	"Professional Crastination"	Fat Mike; Melvin	2:46
4.	"Mean People Suck"		2:02
5.	"Vanilla Sex"		2:35
6.	"S&M Airlines"		4:41
7.	"Drug Free America"	Fat Mike; Melvin	3:41
8.	"Life O'Riley"	Fat Mike; Melvin	1:53
9.	"You Drink, You Drive, You Spill"		2:22
10.	"Scream for Change"		2:54
11.	"Jaundiced Eye"		3:50
12.	"Go Your Own Way" (Fleetwood Mac cover)	Lindsey Buckingham	2:18
Total length:			33:42

- Note: Track 12 is not listed on the vinyl version of the album, but does appear on the CD and cassette versions.

== Personnel ==
Personnel taken from S&M Airlines liner notes.

NOFX

- Fat Mike – bass, vocals
- Erik Sandin – drums
- Eric Melvin – guitar, backing vocals
- Steve Kidwiler – guitar, backing vocals

Additional musicians

- Greg Graffin – backing vocals, vocals on "Go Your Own Way" and "S&M Airlines"
- Brett Gurewitz – backing vocals

Production

- Brett Gurewitz – producer, engineer
- Donnell Cameron – assistant engineer, cover design
- Edward Repka – artwork
- Alison Braun – photography
