= Heideroosjes =

Dutch punk rock band

- Origin: Horst, Limburg, Netherlands
- Genre: Punk rock
- Years active: 1989–2012, 2019–present
- Labels: Epitaph Records, PIAS, I Scream Records, Sonic Rendezvous
- Members: Marco Roelofs; Frank Kleuskens; Mart Nijen Es; Jeroen Meeus
- Past members: Fred Houben; Igor Hobus
- Website: http://www.heideroosjes.com/

Heideroosjes (Dutch pronunciation: [ˈɦɛi̯dəˌroːʃəs]; HR in short), are a Dutch punk rock band from Horst aan de Maas. The band are known for their energetic shows and songs with lyrics mostly in Dutch and English, and a few songs in German and Limburgish (a dialect spoken in the Dutch province of Limburg). The band, formed in 1989, consisted of Marco Roelofs (vocals/guitar), Frank Kleuskens (guitar), Fred Houben (bass) and Igor Hobus (percussion). This lineup has not changed until 2026, when new members Jeroen Meeus (bass) and Mart Nijen Es (drums) got introduced.

Heideroosjes played nearly 1500 shows in Europe, the United States, Japan and South Africa.

== History ==
=== 1989–1999 ===
After releasing two albums on their self-founded label Fairytale Records Heideroosjes got its nationwide breakthrough in 1995 by opening the prestigious Pinkpop festival in The Netherlands. In 1998 the band signed a worldwide record deal with the world's biggest punk label, Epitaph Records, based in Hollywood (CA).

In 1999, the band made its first TV appearance in the United States when talk-show host Jerry Springer played some live footage of their song "Jerry Rules In The Land Of The Free". In this song, taken from their album Schizo, Heideroosjes voiced their opinion on (semi-reality) TV shows like The Jerry Springer Show.

Heideroosjes toured (mainly) Europe with familiar bands like The Offspring, Pennywise, The Misfits, Bad Religion and Less Than Jake.

=== 2000–2010 ===
In 2004, the Heideroosjes tour bus was involved in a serious accident. Three roadies were wounded, and one roadie was seriously injured. The band cancelled their tour but continued a few weeks later. Later that year, Heideroosjes received the Dutch Edison award for their single "Damclub Hooligan" (from their album SINema). In March 2004 the band appeared for the first time live in the US when they played at the SXSW Festival in Austin, Texas. A rave review in The Austin Chronicle said "Now that was a lesson in rock 'n roll. They blew the other bands right of the front door".

In November and December 2005 Heideroosjes did an Ode to the Ramones tour in the Netherlands and Belgium. During this tour they only played covers from their heroes: The Ramones.

In 2006, Heideroosjes made international news by making a song with the mayor of Maastricht, Gerd Leers. In this song, called "Dope man", they mock the Dutch soft drug policy, which in their eyes is hypocritical. A few weeks later the Dutch minister of Justice, Piet Hein Donner, recorded a rap song with rapper Meester G responding to "Dope man" by defending his soft drug policy. Later that year Heideroosjes record their eighth album with Los Angeles-based producer Cameron Webb, who worked with bands like Motörhead, Ignite, Social Distortion and Silverstein. Motörhead singer Lemmy features on the song "My Funeral". Even as Ignite lead singer Zoli Teglas sings in the song "Forgotten Continent".

After years of touring the world including Japan, South Africa, and former Yugoslavia, Heideroosjes started a new phase in their career. In 2008 the band did a 100-show counting comedy tour called "Manie Manie". In this show the music seemed less important and there was more focus on stories, acting and comedy. According to the band "they wanted to try something different. Just because the combination of punk and theater is such a contrast."

In 2009 Heideroosjes celebrated 20 years touring with no line-up changes; the anniversary was marked by a double album and an extensive tour through Europe.

After a 'sabbatical year' in 2010 the band returned to touring and announced a new album for 2011. In September of that year Heideroosjes announced that the new studio album, Cease-Fire, would be their last one. "After this album and the tour, we're gonna quit" the band said. The main reason for the split, according to the band members, was "We still love to play and being on stage. But we are fed up with all the business that comes along with being in a professional band. We had a great time and traveled all over the world. We lived our dreams. And we believe it's better to burn out than to fade away". The farewell tour contained shows at the Lowlands Festival and the Sziget Festival in Hungary (2012). At the end of September 2012 Heideroosjes waved goodbye with two sold-out shows in Holland (Melkweg-Amsterdam) and two sold-out shows in Belgium (AB-Brussels).

=== 2019 ===
In 2019, the Heideroosjes played five shows as support for the German band Wizo and scheduled several other concerts and shows on festivals in the Netherlands, Belgium and Germany.

=== 2025 ===
In February 2025 bassist Fred Houben was arrested and jailed in a case related to child sexual abuse material. Subsequently, the band released a statement he was no longer part of the band.

=== 2026 ===
Through social media and their own website Heideroosjes announced they will be touring again in February and March of 2027. Jeroen Meeus being the new bass player, and Mart Nijen Es replacing original drummer Igor Hobus.

== Discography ==
=== Albums ===
Release date	Title	Label
1991	In Your Face! (DEMO)	
1993	Noisy Fairytales	Fairytale Records
1994	Choice For A Lost Generation?!	Fairytale Records
1996	Fifi	Play It Again Sam
1997	Kung-Fu	Play It Again Sam
1998	Smile... You're Dying!	Epitaph Records
1999	Schizo	Epitaph Records
2001	Fast Forward	Epitaph Records
2002	It's a Life (12,5 Years Live!)	Epitaph Records
2004	SINema	Epitaph Records
2006	Royal to the Bone	I Scream Records (USA only)
2007	Chapter Eight, The Golden State	U-Sonic
2009	20 Years: Ode & Tribute 1989–2009	Fairytale Records / PIAS
2011	Cease-Fire	Fairytale Records / PIAS
2019	30 Years...Live	Fairytale Records
2021	Infocalyps	Fairytale Records

=== Singles ===
Release date	Title	Label
1995	"Goede Tijden, Slechte Tijden"	PIAS
1996	"Klapvee"	PIAS
1996	"Break the Public Peace"	PIAS
1997	"Paradiso" (vinyl single only)	PIAS
1997	"Wurst & Käse"	PIAS
1998	"Firstfuckparty at 701"	PIAS
1999	"Iedereen Is Gek (Behalve Jij!)"	Epitaph Records
1999	"Time is Ticking Away"	Epitaph Records
2001	"Ik Wil Niks!"	Epitaph Records
2001	"Billy Broke a Bottle (Again)"	Epitaph Records
2004	"Damclub Hooligan" (2 songs)	Epitaph Records
2004	"Damclub Hooligan" (Limited, 4 songs)	Epitaph Records
2004	"Scapegoat Revolution"	Epitaph Records
2006	"United Tibet"	Fairytale Records
2007	"Lekker Belangrijk!"	Fairytale Records
2007	"My Funeral"	Fairytale Records
2020	"2020, De Tering!"	Fairytale Records
2021	"Huilie huilie"	Fairytale Records

=== Music videos ===
- "2020, De Tering!"
- "A Bag Full of Stories"
- "Billy Broke a Bottle (Again)"
- "Break the Public Peace"
- "Damclub Hooligan"
- "Da's Toch Dope Man!"
- "De Wereld Draait Door"
- "Doe Maar Net Alsof Je Neus Bloedt"
- "Huilie huilie"
- "Ik Wil Niks!"
- "Iedereen is Gek (Behalve Jij)"
- "Lekker Belangrijk!"
- "My Funeral"
- "Scapegoat Revolution"
- "Weg van de Meeste Weerstand"
- "Würst & Käse"

== Videos and DVDs ==
- 12,5 year Anniversary Concert (VHS, 2002, live concert, shot on 8 June 2002 at Paradiso in Amsterdam)
- Bag Full of Stories (DVD, 2004, live videos and documentary)
- A Year in the Life of... (DVD, 2006, three live concerts, a punkmovie from the Heideroosjes in America, and a parody of the Dutch talk show Jensen!)
- Manie! Manie! (DVD, 2011, comedy show)
- 23 Years Of High Energized Rock & Roll (DVD, 2012)
