= Bombshell Rocks =

Swedish band

- Origin: Västerås, Sweden
- Genres: Punk rock Street punk
- Years active: 1995–
- Labels: Noiseline; Sidekicks Records; Burning Heart Records; Epitaph Records; Combat Rock Industries; Sailorsgrave Records; Household Name Records
- Members: Mårten Cedergran; Christian Määttä; Mathias Lindh; Thomas Falk; Richard Andersson
- Past members: Ola Hjelmberg

Bombshell Rocks is a Swedish band that was founded in 1995, in Västerås, Sweden.

== History ==
The group was formed in 1995 with a line-up of singer Mårten Cedergran, guitarists Richard Andersson and Sami Korhonen, bassist Mathias Lindh, and drummer Chrille Hermansson, and had performed under its original band name, Down and Out, before changing it to Bombshell Rocks.

In early 1996, Bombshell Rocks released an EP in form of a mini six-track album, Who's the Real Bastard. During this period, Thomas Falk became the band's drummer and Christian Määttä the band's guitarist, after Chrille and Sami left the band. In 1997, Bombshell Rocks released an EP, Going Up Going Down, on their own label Noiseline Rec. Sidekicks Records signed Bombshell Rocks the following year, and released the Underground Radio MCD.

In 1999 Bombshell Rocks released its debut album Street Art Gallery. Shortly after this debut, Richard Andersson was replaced by Ola Hjelmberg when he left the band. During this period, Sweden's biggest punk-rock label Burning Heart Records took notice of their Rancid-influenced street punk sound and shortly after the band made a deal with them, resulting in releases on American label Epitaph Records, and Japanese label JVC . After an extensive touring phase e.g. with Millencolin, Dropkick Murphys, 59 Times The Pain, US Bombs, and many more in Europe, USA and Canada they entered in 2000 the studio to prove their debut wasn't a one-shot.

On Cityrats And Alleycats Bombshell Rocks went on with their raw, fast, and energetic punk rock a result of their decision to work with the same engineers and producers they worked with on Street Art Gallery: Mieszko Talarczyk (Nasum) and Mathias Färm (Millencolin). Tours and support for main acts like Blink 182, Millencolin and The Offspring followed.

In 2002 they recorded their 3rd studio album From Here And On at the famous Tonteknik Studio in Umeå, Sweden (where Refused laid down their classic The Shape Of Punk To Come) and followed their path of political motivated punk rock anthems. At this time Ola Hjelmberg had left the band and the original guitar player Richard Anderson returned to the band.

When Mårten Cedergran decided to focus on a career as a tattoo artist and left the band in 2003, guitarists Christian Määttä and Richard Andersson took over the vocals and continued as a four-member band. Bombshell Rocks then released The Conclusion in 2005 on Finnish label Combatrock Industry, US label Sailorsgrave Records and UK label Household Name Rec. The band also toured Japan for the first time in 2007 and 2008 with the release of this record.

In 2012 the band announced that Mårten Cedergran was back in the band, once again as the lead vocalist and lead frontman. They did their first show together after a decade on Millencolin 20 Year Festival in Örebro, Sweden. The band recently announced on their website that they will play Brazil in December 2013 for the first time and also that a new EP will be released on San Francisco based label Pirates Press Records. The band then followed up with a new full-length album in 2014 on Burning Heart and Pirates Press Records called "Generation Tranquilized". Then in 2015 another 7" called "This Time Around".

== Discography ==
=== Studio albums ===
- Street Art Gallery (1999)
- Cityrats And Alleycats (2001)
- From Here And On (2003)
- The Conclusion (2005)
- Generation Tranquilized (2014)

=== EPs ===
- Who's The Real Bastard (1996)
- Going Up Going Down (1997)
- Underground Radio (1998)
- The Will The Message (1999)
- Madhouse (2000)
- Radio Control (2001)
- Love For The Microphone (2004)
- Scars And Tattoos (7", Pirates Press Records, 2014)
- This Time Around (7", Burning Heart/Pirates Press 2014)

=== Music videos ===
- "The Will The Message" (1999)
- "On My Way" (2003)
- "Bloodbrothers" (2005)
- "Move Rhythm City" (2008)
