= I Against I (band) =

Dutch punk rock band

- Origin: Dordrecht, Netherlands
- Genres: Punk rock
- Years active: 1994–2008; 2017–present
- Label: Epitaph Records
- Members: Ronald van Maren, Jasper Blazer, Bob Hoorweg
- Past members: Robin Baard

I Against I is a punk rock band from the Netherlands formerly signed to Epitaph Records.

== History ==
I Against I was formed by two childhood friends, Ronald van Maren and Jasper Blazer, in the mid-1990s in the Netherlands. Their name comes from the Bad Brains record, I Against I. They signed to Epitaph Records in 1996, the first European group to do so. An EP followed in 1997 and an album in 1998 called Headcleaner, which was recorded in The Blasting Room in Fort Collins, Colorado, the studio of Bill Stevenson of All. The group toured Europe and played South by Southwest in 1998. Their sophomore LP titled I'm a Fucked Up Dancer but My Moods Are Swinging followed on Epitaph in 1999, but was released only in Europe. During this time the group toured with, Down by Law, All, and played with several bands like Bad Religion, Pennywise, No Fun At All and Blink-182. In 2002, the group left Epitaph and released five songs on a split album with Italian punk band MadBones on Ammonia Records which was intended as a demo only, but the label liked the five songs enough to officially release them and send the band on tour in Italy, Germany and Belgium. Finally they released a self-titled LP in 2005 on Moondown Records, mixed once again by Bill Stevenson and Jason Livermore.

In November 2008, the band announced that they are calling it quits because "time has come to pursue other things". They reformed in 2017.

== Members ==
- Ronald van Maren - vocals, guitar
- Jasper Blazer - drums
- Bob Hoorweg - bass, vocals

== Discography ==
- Top of the World EP (Epitaph Europe, 1997)
- Headcleaner (Epitaph Records, 1998)
- I'm a Fucked Up Dancer but My Moods Are Swinging (Epitaph Records, 1999)
- Split Competition Vol. 2 (Ammonia Records, 2002)
- I Against I (Moondown Records, 2005)
- Small Waves (White Russian Records, 2018)

== Other media ==
Two tracks from Headcleaner, ‘Maybe Tomorrow’ and ‘Ordinary Fight,’ were used in the 1999 video game Street Sk8er's soundtrack.
