= The Hard Stuff (Wayne Kramer album) =

1995 album by Wayne Kramer

Studio album by Wayne Kramer
- Released: January 10, 1995
- Studios: Westbeach Recorders, Hollywood
- Genre: Rock 'n' roll
- Length: 41:35
- Label: Epitaph
- Producer: Wayne Kramer

Wayne Kramer chronology
The Hard Stuff (1995)	Dangerous Madness (1996)

The Hard Stuff is the solo debut album by American musician Wayne Kramer, best known as a guitarist with the 1960s group MC5. It was released on January 10, 1995, by Epitaph Records. Kramer is supported by a range of younger musicians including the band Claw Hammer and members of Bad Religion, the Melvins, and Suicidal Tendencies.

The cover art is modeled after the influential Blue Note Records releases from the 1950s and '60s.

The album concludes with a hidden track titled "So Long, Hank", a tribute to writer Charles Bukowski who died in 1994.

== Critical reception ==
Professional ratings
Review scores
Source	Rating
AllMusic	4/5 stars
Entertainment Weekly	C+
Rolling Stone	4/5 stars
The Village Voice	(choice cut)

New York wrote that "...the Hard Stuff shows [Kramer] to be in full command of his jam-kicking facilities," while praising the album's "vital rawness". David Sprague and Ira Robbins wrote in Trouser Press that the album "careens from free-jazz-backed spoken word to bug-eyed metal in a manner every bit as fierce and feral as Kramer's golden age." Entertainment Weekly's Mike Flaherty was less favorable, describing the album as "a bombastic album dominated by tales of ’90s-style sociopolitical decay" and giving it a C+. The Washington Post's Mark Jenkins was also critical of the album, writing that on it, Kramer "is still tough and eclectic, but he fails to reconjure the sheer abandon of his former band's best work." Alan Crandall wrote in Perfect Sound Forever that the album "had something, that undefinable "oomph" that keeps you throwing on a particular album because you just really like it for no easily articulated reason."

== Track listing ==
All tracks composed by Wayne Kramer; except where indicated.

1. "Crack in the Universe"
2. "Junkie Romance" (Kramer, Mick Farren)
3. "Bad Seed" (Kramer, Mick Farren)
4. "Poison"
5. "Realm of Pirate Kings" (Kramer, Mick Farren)
6. "Incident on Stock Island"
7. "Pillar of Fire" (Kramer, Mick Farren)
8. "Hope for Sale" (Kramer, Mick Farren)
9. "Edge of the Switchblade"
10. "Sharkskin Suit"
11. "So Long Hank" (hidden track)

== Personnel ==
Adapted from CD booklet

Wayne Kramer: Vocals and guitar (all songs); bass guitar on (6)

(1) Crack in the Universe

- Bass – Rob Walther
- Drums – Bob Lee
- Guitar – Christopher Bagarozzi
- Guitar and harmonica – Jon Wahl

(2) Junkie Romance

- Bass – Rob Walther
- Drums – Bob Lee
- Guitars – Christopher Bagarozzi and Jon Wahl
- Additional vocals – Kim Shattuck

(3) Bad Seed

- Bass – Randy Bradbury
- Drums – Josh Freese

(4) Poison

- Bass – Mark Deutrom
- Drums and Percussion – Dale Crover
- Additional vocals - King Buzzo

(5) Realm of Pirate Kings

- Bass – Matt Freeman
- Drums – Brett Reed
- Guitar and backing vocals—Brett Gurewitz

(6) Incident on Stock Island

- Drums – Josh Freese

(7) Pillar of Fire

- Bass – James Jamerson, Jr.
- Drums – Josh Freese
- Additional vocals - Sweet Pea Atkinson and Marjorie Kramer

(8) Hope for Sale

- Bass – Rob Walther
- Drums – Bob Lee
- Guitars – Christopher Bagarozzi and Jon Wahl

(9) Edge of the Switchblade

- Bass – Bruce Duff
- Drums – Josh Freese
- Additional vocals - Keith Morris

10 Sharkskin Suit

- Bass – Randy Bradbury
- Drums – Josh Freese

Technical Personnel

- Sally Browder – engineer, mixing
- Greg Cathcart – assistant engineer
- Brett Gurewitz – mixing
- Steve Kravac – assistant engineer
- Stephen Marcussen – mastering
- Mackie Osborne – art direction
- Tony Rambo – assistant engineer
- Dan Winters – photography
