= Epitaph Records =

American independent record label

- Founded: 1980
- Founder: Brett Gurewitz
- Distributors: AMPED Distribution (United States); PIAS (United Kingdom); ADA (formerly)
- Genre: Punk rock, emo, post-hardcore, metalcore, skate punk, hardcore punk, pop-punk, indie rock, alternative rock, screamo, hip-hop
- Country of origin: United States
- Location: Hollywood, California
- Official website: epitaph.com

Epitaph Records is an American record label owned by Brett Gurewitz, guitarist of Bad Religion. A large portion of the record label, known as Hellcat Records, is owned by Tim Armstrong, frontman of the punk rock band Rancid. Several sister labels also exist, such as ANTI-, Burning Heart Records, and Heart & Skull Records that have signed other types of bands.

== History ==
=== Early years (1980s) ===
Brett Gurewitz formed Epitaph Records as a vehicle for releases by his band Bad Religion. The name had been taken from the King Crimson Cold War protest song "Epitaph" from which the lyrics "Confusion will be my epitaph." had struck a chord with Brett Gurewitz and Greg Graffin when they were young. Its first release for the label was Bad Religion's 1981 self-titled EP, followed by their debut How Could Hell Be Any Worse?, which was also the label's first full-length release. Also released during this period was Peace thru Vandalism, an EP by the Vandals, who were the first band besides Bad Religion to sign to Epitaph. Two more Bad Religion releases followed – Into the Unknown and the EP Back to the Known – before their temporary split. After Gurewitz had cleaned up his drug issues, both Epitaph and Bad Religion were revived in 1987. In the following year, Epitaph released its first record as a proper label, which was L7's self-titled album, and it was distributed by Chameleon. Also in 1988, Bad Religion released Suffer, which was both released and distributed by Epitaph.

In 1989, Gurewitz signed NOFX to Epitaph. They released their debut for the label, S&M Airlines, that same year, featuring the video for its title track and the cover of Fleetwood Mac's "Go Your Own Way", which featured guest vocals by Gurewitz and Greg Graffin, also a member of Bad Religion. This was followed by Bad Religion's next two albums – No Control and Against the Grain – which sold 60,000 and 100,000 copies respectively.

=== Breakthrough success (1990s) ===
By 1993, more punk acts had signed to Epitaph, and the label relocated to new offices in Silver Lake, Los Angeles.

Although Bad Religion was the founding band of Epitaph, releasing their early records through the label, they signed with Atlantic in 1993. Gurewitz left Bad Religion the following year; he later attributed the split to "money, drugs, personality clashes" and to the pressures of the label's sudden expansion, saying Epitaph "was exploding overnight" on the success of the Offspring and Rancid.

=== Change in style (2000s) ===
In 2001, Brett Gurewitz returned to Bad Religion, and the band returned to Epitaph Records, releasing seven more albums, the latest being Age of Unreason (2019).

In mid-2005 Epitaph was added to the official list of RIAA members along with several other high-profile independent labels. The reason for the listing is not clear, but one source points to an agreement for internet P2P distribution. Another source claims label management joined RIAA to get certified sales awards (i.e., official "Gold" or "Platinum" record status) for releases. This sparked some controversy as some feel they should no longer be labeled independent if they are a member of the RIAA. However, the only source that has actually been used for these claims of membership is the official RIAA membership list, which has been disputed. As of this writing, not only is Epitaph listed as an official member but Lookout! Records is once again listed, after being falsely listed before. In addition, Fat Wreck Chords has released statements denying their own involvement in the RIAA, condemning the organization.

=== Recent years (2010s) ===
Epitaph signed Weezer in 2010, the label releasing Hurley later that year. The label signed Social Distortion in the same year. Epitaph signed Australian punk band Dangerous! in 2011 and released album Teenage Rampage. Epitaph had also signed the Canadian punk rock band Propagandhi. The label has also been more active in signing bands from the emo revival including The Menzingers, Joyce Manor, Pianos Become the Teeth, Defeater, the World Is a Beautiful Place & I Am No Longer Afraid to Die, and Touché Amoré. The Epitaph Records is featured as in-game radio station in several Forza Horizon games.

== Sales certifications ==
Epitaph has issued two albums that have been certified as platinum or multi-platinum, for sales of over 1 million units, by the Recording Industry Association of America: Smash by the Offspring, which has been certified six-times platinum, and ...And Out Come the Wolves by Rancid, which has been certified platinum.

Seven albums released by the label, or its subsidiaries Hellcat and ANTI-, have been certified gold for sales of 500,000 copies: Ignition by the Offspring, Punk in Drublic by NOFX, Let's Go by Rancid, Orphans: Brawlers, Bawlers & Bastards by Tom Waits, The Drug in Me Is You and Popular Monster by Falling in Reverse, The Warrior's Code by Dropkick Murphys and Sempiternal by Bring Me the Horizon.

== Artists ==
=== Current artists ===
- The All-American Rejects
- Architects (World ex. Australia, South Africa and New Zealand)
- Bad Religion
- Bad Suns
- Breakkaway
- Cold Hart
- Converge
- Danny Elfman
- Death Lens
- Defeater
- Descendents
- Dolo Tonight
- Drain
- Falling in Reverse
- The Frights
- The Garden
- The Ghost Inside
- Hunny
- Jamie T
- Joyce Manor
- Justin Pierre
- La Dispute
- Late Night Drive Home
- The Lawrence Arms
- Lil Lotus
- The Linda Lindas
- Magnolia Park
- Mannequin Pussy
- Matchbook Romance
- The Menzingers
- Millencolin
- Motion City Soundtrack
- The Muslims
- Nevertel
- Off With Their Heads
- Parkway Drive (World Ex. Australia & New Zealand)
- Pennywise
- Pianos Become the Teeth
- Plague Vendor
- Pool Kids
- Propagandhi
- Quicksand
- Raised Fist
- Remo Drive
- Retox
- Roe Kapara
- Save Face
- Sleep Theory
- Sleepwave
- Social Distortion
- Soul Glo
- Teenage Wrist
- Thrice
- The World Is a Beautiful Place & I Am No Longer Afraid to Die

=== Former artists ===
- 1208 (Disbanded)
- 98 Mute (Disbanded)
- 59 Times The Pain (Disbanded)
- Agnostic Front
- ALL
- Alesana
- Alkaline Trio (active with Rise Records)
- Atmosphere
- Avion Roe (Disbanded)
- Beatsteaks
- Beautiful Bodies (Disbanded)
- Brand New
- Big Talk
- The Blood Brothers (re-releasing old material)
- Bombshell Rocks
- Bob Log III
- The Bouncing Souls (active with Pure Noise Records)
- Bring Me the Horizon (active with Sony Music)
- Burning Heads
- The Blackout
- The Business (Disbanded)
- The Casualties (Hellcat Records)
- Circle Jerks
- Claw Hammer (Disbanded)
- Coffin Break (Disbanded)
- The Color of Violence
- Cover Your Tracks (inactive since 2016)
- The Cramps (Disbanded)
- Culture Abuse (Disbanded)
- Dag Nasty
- Danger Doom (Disbanded)
- Dangerous!
- Daredevils (Disbanded)
- A Day to Remember (one partner release with ADTR Records; distribution only, active with Fueled By Ramen)
- Dropkick Murphys (Hellcat Records)
- Dead Fucking Last
- Death by Stereo (active with Indecision Records)
- Desaparecidos
- The Distillers
- Division of Laura Lee
- Down By Law
- The Draft (Disbanded)
- Dwarves
- Error (Disbanded)
- Escape the Fate (active with Big Noise Records)
- Every Time I Die (Disbanded)
- Eyedea & Abilities (Disbanded)
- Farewell
- Frank Turner (active with Polydor/Xtra Mile)
- Frenzal Rhomb
- Flogging Molly
- From First to Last
- Gallows (re-releasing old material in North America)
- Gas Huffer (Disbanded)
- The Ghost of a Thousand (Disbanded)
- Green Day (re-releasing old material in Europe;)
- The Get Up Kids (re-release only)
- Guttermouth
- H_{2}O (active with Bridge Nine Records)
- Heavens (disbanded)
- Hot Water Music
- The Higher (Disbanded)
- Hell Is for Heroes
- The Hives
- Heideroosjes
- Humpers
- I Against I
- I Am Ghost (Disbanded)
- I Killed the Prom Queen
- Ikara Colt (Disbanded)
- The (International) Noise Conspiracy (Disbanded)
- I Set My Friends on Fire
- The Joykiller (Disbanded)
- Wayne Kramer
- L7
- Less Than Jake
- Leathermouth
- Letlive
- Madball
- Me First and the Gimme Gimmes (one time release only) (Active with Fat Wreck Chords)
- The Matches
- New Found Glory (active with Pure Noise Records)
- New Bomb Turks
- Nick Cave and the Bad Seeds
- No Fun At All (Burning Heart Records)
- NOFX (disbanded)
- Obey the Brave (Disbanded)
- The Offspring
- Osker (Disbanded)
- Our Last Night
- Pete Philly and Perquisite (Disbanded)
- The Pietasters
- Poison Idea (Disbanded)
- Pulley
- Randy
- Red Aunts (Disbanded)
- Refused
- Rich Kids on LSD (Disbanded)
- Rancid (Now active on Epitaph’s sub label, Hellcat Records)
- Ruth Ruth
- Saosin (active with Sumerian Records)
- Satanic Surfers
- SayWeCanFly (active with We Are Triumphant)
- Scatter the Ashes
- Settle
- Set Your Goals
- The Donnas
- The Sidekicks (Disbanded)
- Sing It Loud (Disbanded)
- Sleeping with Sirens (active with Rise Records)
- SNFU (Disbanded)
- Some Girls
- The Sound of Animals Fighting
- The Special Goodness
- Story of the Year
- Straight Faced
- Sugarcult (on hiatus)
- Ten Foot Pole
- Terrorgruppe
- Thelonious Monster
- This Wild Life
- Thursday
- Too Close to Touch (Disbanded)
- Total Chaos
- Title Fight (inactive)
- Touché Amoré
- Tricky
- Turbonegro
- U.S. Bombs
- The Vandals (active with Kung Fu Records)
- Vanna (Disbanded)
- Voodoo Glow Skulls (active with Dr. Strange Records)
- The Weakerthans (on hiatus)
- Weezer (active with Warner Records)
- You Me at Six (active with BMG Rights Management)
- Zeke

== Compilations ==
- Punk-O-Rama series
- Unsound series
- How We Rock
- Spirit of the Streets
- Epitaph / Union skate/surf DVD series
  - Football Schmootball (1st)
  - DC Video (3rd)
  - Circle One (5th)
  - Bored Generation skate/surf enhanced CD-ROM (1996)
  - More Songs About Anger, Fear, Sex & Death (1992)
- New Noise (2010)
- New Noise 2 (2011)

== See also ==
- Epitaph Records discography
- List of record labels
- Hellcat Records
- Anti-
