= Pennywise discography =

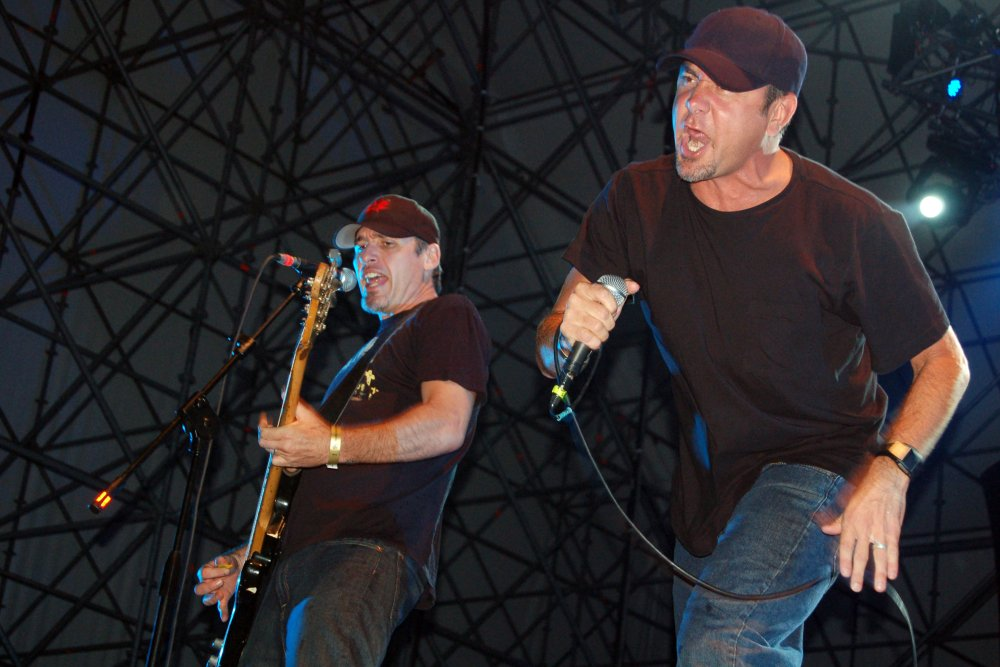
- Pennywise onstage in 2006. Pictured are Randy Bradbury (left) and Jim Lindberg (right)
- Studio albums: 12
- Extended plays: 2
- Live albums: 1
- Compilation albums: 2
- Singles: 14
- Video albums: 2

The discography of Pennywise, an American punk rock band formed in 1988 in Hermosa Beach, California, currently consists of twelve studio albums, one live album, two extended plays (EPs), one compilation, one DVD and fourteen singles. This list is not intended to include material performed by members or former members of Pennywise that was recorded with CON/800, One Hit Wonder and Chaos Delivery Machine.

== Studio albums ==
Year	Album details	Peak chart positions										Certification
Year	Album details	US	US Ind.	AUS	CAN	FIN	GER	NLD	NZL	SWI	UK	Certification
1991	Pennywise: Released: October 22, 1991; Label: Epitaph; Format: CD, CS, LP	—	—	—	—	—	—	—	—	—	—	
1993	Unknown Road: Released: August 17, 1993; Label: Epitaph; Format: CD, CS, LP	—	—	—	—	—	—	—	—	—	—	
1995	About Time: Released: June 13, 1995; Label: Epitaph; Format: CD, CS, LP	96	—	55	—	24	76	84	—	—	—	ARIA: Gold
1997	Full Circle: Released: April 22, 1997; Label: Epitaph; Format: CD, CS, LP	79	—	13	50	38	—	93	36	—	—	ARIA: Gold
1999	Straight Ahead: Released: June 1, 1999; Label: Epitaph; Format: CD, CS, LP	62	—	8	17	—	93	—	12	—	193	ARIA: Gold
2001	Land of the Free?: Released: June 19, 2001; Label: Epitaph; Format: CD, CS, LP	67	2	21	68	—	—	—	32	89	134	
2003	From the Ashes: Released: September 9, 2003; Label: Epitaph; Format: CD, CS, LP	54	4	13	32	—	77	—	47	47	148	
2005	The Fuse: Released: August 9, 2005; Label: Epitaph; Format: CD	78	9	36	42	—	100	—	—	60	—	
2008	Reason to Believe: Released: March 25, 2008; Label: MySpace; Format: CD, LP, DI	98	12	46	—	—	—	—	—	97	—	
2012	All or Nothing: Released: May 1, 2012; Label: Epitaph; Format: CD, LP, DI	76	10	27	66	—	49	—	—	34	—	
2014	Yesterdays: Released: July 15, 2014; Label: Epitaph; Format: CD, LP, DI	62	9	16	—	—	41	—	—	52	—	
2018	Never Gonna Die: Released: April 20, 2018; Label: Epitaph; Format: CD, LP, DI	119	8	18	—	—	24	—	—	23	—	
"—" denotes a release that did not chart.

== EPs ==
Year	Title	Label	Other information
1989	A Word from the Wise	Theologian	Compiled together in 1992 on Wildcard/A Word from the Wise
1992	Wildcard	Theologian	Compiled together in 1992 on Wildcard/A Word from the Wise

== Compilation / live albums ==
Year	Title	Label	US Billboard Peak	Format	Other information
1992	Wildcard/A Word from the Wise	Theologian		CD	Repackaging of the band's first two EPs.; The first five tracks are A Word from the Wise.; The rest of the tracks are Wildcard.
2000	Live @ the Key Club	Epitaph	198	CD/LP	The band's only live album to date.; Contains a cover of "Minor Threat", originally written by the band with the same title.
2015	Nighteen Eighty Eight	Hardline Entertainment		Vinyl	Repackaging of the band's first two EPs.; The first five tracks are A Word from the Wise.; The rest of the tracks are Wildcard.

== Compilation appearances ==
Year	Title	Label	US Billboard Peak	Format	Other information
1996	Bored Generation	Epitaph		CD	contribute a cover of the Circle Jerks track "Don't Care/Live Fast Die Young".
1996	MOM: Music For Our Mother Ocean	Interscope Records		CD	contribute a cover of the Beach Boys track "Surfin' USA".
1997	Generations I - A Punk Look At Human Rights	Ark 21 Records		CD	contribute a cover of the Black Flag track "Nervous Breakdown".
1997	Violent World - A Tribute to the Misfits	Caroline Records		CD	contribute the track "Astro Zombies".
1998	Punk-O-Rama III	Epitaph		CD	contribute the track "Wake Up"
1999	Punk-O-Rama 4	Epitaph		CD	contribute the track "Fight It", the only previously unreleased track on the compilation.
1999	Short Music For Short People	Fat Wreck Chords	191	CD	contribute the track "30 Seconds 'Till The End of The World".
2000	Punk-O-Rama 5	Epitaph		CD	contribute the track "Badge of pride."
2001	Punk-O-Rama 6	Epitaph		CD	contribute the track "We're Desperate", an X cover, featuring the vocals of Exene Cervenka.
2002	Punk-O-Rama 7	Epitaph		CD	contribute the track "The World".
2003	Punk-O-Rama 8	Epitaph		CD	contribute the track "Holiday in the sun".
2004	Rock Against Bush, Vol. 1	Fat Wreck Chords		CD	contribute the track "God Save The USA"
2004	Punk-O-Rama Vol. 9	Epitaph		CD	contribute the track "Now I know".
2005	Look at All the Love We Found	Cornerstone RAS		CD	Tribute album by various artists dedicated to Sublime.; contribute a cover of "Same in the End"
2005	Punk-O-Rama 10	Epitaph		CD	contribute the track "falling down".
2006	Unsound	Epitaph		CD	contribute the track "knocked down".
2007	Our Impact Will Be Felt	Abacus Recordings		CD	Tribute album by various artists dedicated to Sick of It All.; contribute the track "My Life"
2009	Let Them Know – The Story of Youth Brigade and BYO Records	BYO Records		CD	contribute the 7 Seconds cover "We're Gonna Fight"
2013	The Songs of Tony Sly: A Tribute	Fat Wreck Chords		CD, vinyl, DD	contribute the Tony Sly cover "Devonshire & Crown"

== Video releases ==
Year	Title	Label	Format	Other information
1995	Home Movies	Epitaph	VHS/DVD	Originally released on VHS in 1995.; Released on DVD on November 9, 2004.
1995	Unity	Millennium Productions	VHS	Originally released on VHS in 1995.

== Singles ==
Year	Song	US Alt	AUS	NZ	Album
1993	"Homesick"	—	—	—	Unknown Road
1993	“Dying to Know”	—	—	—	Unknown Road
1994	"Tomorrow/Don't Feel Nothing"	—	—	—	Non-album single
1995	"Same Old Story"	—	—	—	About Time
1996	Searching	—	—	—	About Time
1997	"Society"	—	83	—	Full Circle
1997	“What if I”	—	—	—	Full Circle
1999	"Alien"	36	62	—	Straight Ahead
1999	"Down Under"	—	66	47	Straight Ahead
1999	“Straight Ahead”	—	—	—	Straight Ahead
2000	"Victim of Reality"	—	—	—	Straight Ahead
2001	"Fuck Authority"	38	—	—	Land of the Free?
2001	"Divine Intervention"	—	—	—	Land of the Free?
2003	"Yesterdays"	—	—	—	From the Ashes
2003	"Waiting"	—	—	—	From the Ashes
2004	"God Save The USA"	—	—	—	From the Ashes
2005	"Disconnect"	—	—	—	The Fuse
2005	"Knocked Down"	—	—	—	The Fuse
2008	"The Western World"	22	—	—	Reason to Believe
2008	"Die for You"	—	—	—	Reason to Believe
2009	"One Reason"	—	—	—	Reason to Believe
2012	"All or Nothing"	—	—	—	All or Nothing
2012	"Let Us Hear Your Voice"	—	—	—	All or Nothing
"—" denotes a release that did not chart.

== Music videos ==
- "Homesick" and "Dying to Know" (both released in 1993 and from "Unknown Road").
- "Same Old Story" (released in 1995; from "About Time").
- "Society" and "Bro Hymn Tribute" (both released in 1997 and from "Full Circle")
- "Alien" and "Straight Ahead" (both released in 1999; from "Straight Ahead").
- "Fuck Authority" and "My God" (both released in 2001 and from "Land of the Free")
- "Knocked Down" (released in 2006; from "The Fuse")
- "The Western World" (released in 2008; from "Reason to Believe")
- "Let Us Hear Your Voice" and "Revolution" (released in 2012; from "All or Nothing")
- "Violence Never Ending" (released in 2014; from "Yesterdays")

== Video games ==
- Top Skater (1997; the soundtrack consists of ten songs from earlier Pennywise albums and one new Pennywise track)
