= From the Ashes (album) =

Studio album by Pennywise
- Released: September 9, 2003
- Recorded: January – April 2003
- Studio: Stall #2, Redondo Beach, California
- Genres: Punk rock; skate punk; hard rock
- Length: 41:00
- Label: Epitaph
- Producers: Darian Rundall; Pennywise

Pennywise chronology
Land of the Free? (2001)	From the Ashes (2003)	The Fuse (2005)

Singles from From the Ashes
- 1. "Waiting" Released: August 19, 2003; 2. "Yesterdays" Released: 2003; 3. "God Save the USA" Released: 2004

From the Ashes is the seventh studio album by the American punk rock band Pennywise.

== Background and recording ==
Pennywise released their sixth studio album, Land of the Free?, in June 2001. The band promoted it with a short stint on the Warped Tour, a Midwestern tour of the United States, and shows in Australia and Japan until April 2002. After this, guitarist Fletcher Dragge spent three months writing material for their next album. In November 2002, it was reported that they had spent a few months in a studio, having completed 15 demos. In January 2003, the band began recording their next album; sessions continued into April 2003. Sessions were held at Stall #2 in Redondo Beach, California; Darian Rundall and the band produced the proceedings. Drummer Byron McMackin said 14 songs were recorded from a potential pool of over 30. They took a break from recording to play a benefit show in February 2003. The band took further time out when Dragge's father died; the album was eventually mixed in June 2003.

== Composition and lyrics ==
=== Music and themes ===
AllMusic reviewer Johnny Loftus described the album's sound as punk rock and said it borrowed a "page from NOFX's War on Errorism, promoting an agenda of awareness amidst its fist-pumping, sun-drenched anthems". Stein Haukland of Ink 19 referred to the album has skate punk with elements of hardcore punk. Lollipop Magazine writer Ewan Wadharmi classified it as hard rock and compared the guitar riffs to the work of Bon Jovi and Thin Lizzy. He wrote that it explores the "political whistle-blowing of Land of the Free?" as the band attempt to "answer what to do in the aftermath".

The overall sound of From the Ashes recalled that of Pennywise's third studio album About Time (1995), while one reviewer referred to it as their "most fuming album" since their fourth studio effort Full Circle (1997), with the combination of "[s]ub-grindcore drums; chugging, circle-pit guitar; and Jim Lindberg's distinctive vocals, all velvet and venom". Larry Getlen of CityLink Magazine said the music was a "generation removed from that of the band's hardcore predecessors, with many of the drum fills and guitar licks owing more to metal than punk".

Dragge said the lyrics for From the Ashes were written as a reaction to Land of the Free?, which received a minor backlash from some people due to its political nature. He explained that following the September 11 attacks, "people were a little confused as to what Pennywise was about, because we had a lot of anti-government-type songs on that record, and people were feeling like they needed to be behind the government". As a result, they had a meeting and decided that they were going to write about what they "believe is true and what needs to be talked about and what we feel in our hearts".

Dragge said the album's title "symbolizes a type of starting over, and learning lessons from major events like 9/11". He attributed some of the "more heartfelt" lyrics to the band's state of mind following the September 11 attacks, and mentioned that the death of their former bassist Jason Thirsk was a "pretty profound moment" for them. The album's lyrics also covers the Bush administration's handling of the attacks, in addition to ideology beliefs, such as gun control, news media bias and government abuse.

=== Tracks ===
From the Ashes opens with "Now I Know", a skate punk song that deals with self-discovery. "God Save the USA" is critical of the US government and alludes to the work of the Sex Pistols. Lindberg said it dealt with the "government's refusal to protect our greatest natural resources". "Something to Change", another skate punk song, deals with boredom. "Salvation" recalled the work of the band's labelmates Bad Religion. The tempo of "Look Who You Are" evokes the band's earlier material. "Falling Down" sees Lindberg tackle the topic of ageing and hitting middle age.

"Holiday in the Sun" was the most reminiscent of the material on Land of the Free?. "This Is Only a Test" is bookended by acoustic intro and outro sections. PopMatters contributor Christine Klunk said the acoustic accompaniment "provides an appropriate beginning to a song that details the tendency of humans to build such walls of 'arrogance' around themselves". "Rise Up" is about being held responsible for one's own actions. "Yesterdays" is the slowest song on the album and incorporates a piano. The album concludes with "Judgement Day", a song that Klunk said warns listeners that the "world is no longer ours, that we've had our fun, and it's time to realize there are consequences for messing with the planet's equilibrium".

== Release ==
On June 3, 2003, From the Ashes was announced for release in three months' time; alongside this, the track listing was posted online. In early-to-mid July and late July to early August 2003, the group appeared on the Warped Tour. On August 4, 2003, "God Save the USA" was made available as a free download. "Waiting" was posted on the band's website on August 13, 2003, before being released to radio on August 19, 2003. For the rest of the month, the band toured across Europe, which included appearances at the Reading and Leeds Festivals. From the Ashes was released on September 9, 2003, through Epitaph Records. Sohum Shah of The Cannabist said the album contributed to the "resurgence of politically-charged punk rock recorded during the George W. Bush presidency", alongside The War on Errorism and The Terror State (2003) by Anti-Flag. From the Ashes featured a DVD with studio footage, live performances and a trailer for a forthcoming video album; it was promoted with multiple releases shows across California. On October 3, 2003, the band appeared on Jimmy Kimmel Live!. They took a brief break as Lindberg and his wife had a child.

Pennywise appeared at the Smoke Out festival in November 2003, and performed at the KROQ Almost Acoustic Christmas festival the following month. On New Year's Eve 2003 and New Years Day 2004, the band performed at Falls Festival in Australia. In January and February 2004, they went on a tour of the US; the January shows featured Mad Caddies and Stretch Arm Strong, while the February shows included Guttermouth and Stretch Arm Strong. On April 7, 2004, Pennywise performed on The Late Late Show with Craig Kilborn. Shortly afterwards, they played a handful of dates with Authority Zero and Autopilot Off running into May 2004. Pennywise toured Europe as part of the Deconstruction Tour, which lasted until June. They then went on shorts tours of Canada and Japan, and a one-off show in Hawaii. In August 2004, the band performed at the Moto Music Mayhem festival in Canada, followed by an appearance at the Holiday Havoc festival in the US in November 2004. They ended the year with performances in Brazil at the 89FM and Radio Cidede festivals.

== Reception ==
Professional ratings
Review scores
Source	Rating
AllMusic	4/5 stars
Blender	2/5 stars
The Boston Phoenix	2.5/5 stars
Drowned in Sound	3/5 stars
IGN	5.4/10
Kerrang!	4/5 stars
Ox-Fanzine	9/10
Punknews.org	3.5/5 stars
Revolver	4/5 stars
Rock Hard	7.5/10

From the Ashes was met with mixed reviews from music critics. Loftus said it was a "welcome, rocking return to form after some weaker efforts". Haukland said that while "it’s hard not to compare From the Ashes with Land of the Free?, the latter album doesn’t necessarily benefit from such comparison", explaining that the band come across as "more comfortable with their new-found sense of social commentary here". Kerrang!'s James Sherry praised the band for sticking "rigidly to the formula that got them this far" as their "melodic punk formula is still sounding minty fresh and full of life". The Boston Phoenix writer Sean Richardson said the band "play to their strengths", referring to Lindberg's "neurotic howl" their "maximum-impact" punk sound. Vinnie Apicella of In Music We Trust said the album "goes Mach-1 with melody, mindfulness and taut musicianship that are unmistakably Punk yet threateningly offensive to fast talking order takers of the big label, bloated budget variety". Ox-Fanzine's Randy Flame wrote that the band "remain true to themselves and that's a good thing". He added that every track "live up to the criterion of 'catchy' and 'intoxicating'", while Jeff Perlah Revolver said Dragge was "still spewing the kind of chunky, speedy licks that made Pennywise indie-punk heroes a decade ago". Rock Hard reviewer Michael Rensen noted that their last few releases "sound pretty interchangeable", and From the Ashes offers listeners "highly melodic, socially critical Calicore rubble". Mike Verzella of Mxdwn felt that it "brings back memories of cruising with the guys and jumping around at shows".

Stuart Green of Exclaim! said the "14 tracks of exactly what we've come to expect. While that may sound like a band stagnating and unable to develop, there's something comforting" in the band being able to "put things in perspective". IGN writer Nick Madsen said that after being a long-term listener, he was "expecting the new album to show some signs of progression and sadly, it doesn't". While complimenting the lyrics for being "matured and seem[ingly] more focused", he criticized the structure of the songs for being the "same, the sound is the same and frankly, the formula is getting a little stale". Punknews.org staff member Jim wrote it "still sounds like Pennywise, but there are little intricacies that set this one apart from their past couple of albums". Aside from the odd track, he mentioned that the remainder of the album was "solid and some of the songs even hold up to the band's older material". He felt that the "political lyrics seem less contrived" compared to those on the album's predecessor. Punk Planet writer Ari Joffe said there was a "few good singalong punk tunes" on the album, but it mainly "stairs up ambivalence [...] it's too rigid for my tastes". Klunk referred to it as a "solid contribution to their catalogue", but acknowledged that it did not have "much variety, not much that breaks out of punk's stereotypical traits". The staff at Modern Fix held a similar view, stating that it features "very little experimentation in sound and formula, and you almost wish that Pennywise would find the motivation to put a new spin on things". Drowned in Sound writer Mat Hocking felt that with repeated listens, the songs seemed weaker than tracks found on About Time, Full Circle or their fifth studio album Straight Ahead (1999), "and as such you start to wish they had experimented a little further". Wadharmi found the tracks to be "very similar, and bear a striking resemblance to previous albums". He added that the "better-than-average lyrics point to matters of significance while rarely touching the dirty things". Nick Catucci of Blender said in the context of Blink-182 and NOFX, "those bands bring humor and warmth into the mix; Pennywise still rely on pro forma antiauthority anthems".

From the Ashes reached number 54 on the Billboard 200 and number 4 on the Top Independent Albums chart, marking the highest initial charting album in Pennywise's career.

== Track listing ==
All songs written by Pennywise.

1. "Now I Know" – 2:59
2. "God Save the USA" – 3:06
3. "Something to Change" – 2:41
4. "Waiting" – 2:59
5. "Salvation" – 2:42
6. "Look Who You Are" – 3:05
7. "Falling Down" – 2:56
8. "Holiday in the Sun" – 3:06
9. "This Is Only a Test" – 2:57
10. "Punch Drunk" – 3:10
11. "Rise Up" – 2:47
12. "Yesterdays" – 3:34
13. "Change My Mind" – 2:09
14. "Judgment Day" – 2:49

== Personnel ==
Personnel per booklet.

Pennywise

- Jim Lindberg – vocals
- Fletcher Dragge – guitars
- Randy Bradbury – bass
- Byron McMackin – drums

Production and design

- Darian Rundall – producer, engineer
- Pennywise – producer
- Clark Studios – art direction, design

== Charts ==
Chart performance for From the Ashes
Chart (2003)	Peak position
Australian Albums (ARIA)	13
French Albums (SNEP)	130
German Albums (Offizielle Top 100)	77
New Zealand Albums (RMNZ)	47
Swiss Albums (Schweizer Hitparade)	47
US Billboard 200	54
US Independent Albums (Billboard)	4
