= 98 Mute (album) =

Studio album by 98 Mute
- Released: May 3, 1996
- Recorded: Total Access, Redondo Beach, California, U.S.
- Genre: Hardcore punk
- Length: 27:24
- Label: Theologian
- Producer: Fletcher Dragge; Eddie Ashworth

98 Mute chronology
98 Mute (1996)	Class of 98 (1998)

Professional ratings
Review scores
Source	Rating
Allmusic	2/5 stars

98 Mute is the debut release by the hardcore punk band, 98 Mute. It was released on May 3, 1996, on Theologian Records. It was co-produced by Pennywise's guitarist Fletcher Dragge and features Justin Thirsk on drums, the brother of the late Jason Thirsk, Pennywise bass player. It was the first of four albums before the band split up. They followed this album with Class of 98 in 1998.

== Track listing ==
All tracks are written by 98 Mute.

No.	Title	Length
1.	"Wrong"	1:44
2.	"A.C.A.B."	2:57
3.	"Dreams"	1:59
4.	"Another Boring Day"	2:09
5.	"Painkiller"	1:36
6.	"Answers"	2:07
7.	"Them"	1:34
8.	"Better Days Ahead"	1:53
9.	"Ground Zero"	2:00
10.	"Young Americans"	1:41
11.	"Beauty Queen"	1:39
12.	"Don't"	2:15
13.	"Fair Game"	2:34
14.	"Last Laugh"	1:16

== Credits ==
=== 98 Mute ===
- Pat Ivie – vocals
- Jason Page – guitar
- Doug Weems – bass
- Justin Thirsk – drums

=== Recording ===
- Recorded and mixed at Total Access, Redondo Beach, California, USA
- Produced and mixed by Fletcher Dragge and Eddie Ashworth
- Engineered by Eddie Ashworth
