= Bro Hymn =

Song by Pennywise

from the album Pennywise
- Released: 1991 (Pennywise version); 1997 (Full Circle version)
- Recorded: 1991 (Pennywise version); 1996 (Full Circle version)
- Genre: Punk rock; pop-punk; skate punk
- Length: 3:00 (Pennywise version); 5:30 (Full Circle version)
- Label: Epitaph
- Songwriter(s): Jason Thirsk; Jim Lindberg; Fletcher Dragge; Byron McMackin
- Producer(s): Pennywise (both versions); Jerry Finn (Full Circle version)

"Bro Hymn" is a song by American punk rock band Pennywise. It is the last track on both their 1991 self-titled debut album, and 1997's Full Circle as "Bro Hymn (Tribute)". Its lyrics are about the death of bassist Jason Thirsk's friends Tim Colvin and Carlos Canton (who both died in separate motorcycle accidents), and Tom Nichols (who drowned at Hermosa Beach Pier in 1988).

In 1996, following the death of Thirsk, "Bro Hymn" was recorded again for their fourth album Full Circle as "Bro Hymn Tribute", which is dedicated to him. On this version, one of the lines from the original, "Canton, Colvin, Nichols, this one's for you", is replaced with "Jason Matthew Thirsk, this one's for you". In addition, "To all my friends" was replaced with "To our best friend", "Especially those who weren't with us too long" was replaced with "Though you weren't with us too long," in reference to Thirsk being the band's first bassist, "Life is the most precious thing you can lose" having the words "is" and "you can" being replaced with "was" and "we could", and the final "Canton, Colvin, Nichols, this one's for you" being replaced with "Jason, my brother, this one's for you". This version of "Bro Hymn" was not a hit song on the charts, but today receives substantial radio play.

When Pennywise perform the song live, they mix the lyrics from the original and "Tribute".

Bassnectar's song "Pennywise Tribute" on his Vava Voom album is a remix of "Bro Hymn (Tribute)".

"Bro Hymn" is the anthem for many sports teams around the world, mostly in the United States:

- The National Hockey League's Anaheim Ducks played it after each home goal following the 2005–06 season until the 2023-24 season. When the Ducks won in the 2007 Stanley Cup Finals, the band played Bro Hymn live at the team's victory rally. This version was extended to cover the time it took the team to travel the red carpet and reach the stage with the Stanley Cup. Lyrics of the song were also changed to "Anaheim Ducks, this one's for you..."
- The National Hockey League's Philadelphia Flyers also used "Bro Hymn" from the 2007–08 season to the end of the 2010-11 regular season for each Flyers goal scored at home.
- The National Hockey League's New York Islanders made this their goal song on December 12, 2009.
- The official goal song of the German soccer club and 2007 champion VfB Stuttgart since the 06/07 season and is played after each home goal. The band performed the song once in the stadium when they were touring Europe.
- The official goal song of the Dutch soccer club Vitesse Arnhem
- The United Hockey League's Bloomington Prairie Thunder since their inaugural season (06/07), and is played after every home goal
- The Belgian soccer club K.R.C. Genk
- The Belgian soccer club Zulte Waregem
- The American Major League Soccer soccer club Houston Dynamo goal song
- The American Hockey League's Texas Stars have used it as their goal song since their inaugural 2009–10 season
- Played by the Seattle Sounders band before the march to the stadium from Pioneer Square at the MLS Cup 2009
- National Football League Arizona Cardinals used it for touchdown song in the 2008 season
- The National Lacrosse League Rochester Knighthawks currently use it as goal celebration song
- The National Lacrosse League New York Titans used the song before they folded
- The Major League Soccer San Jose Quakes use it for celebrating home goals during the 2010 season
- The Canadian Football League Montreal Alouettes play it whenever they get a first down at home
- The Jacksonville Jaguars played this song after a win during the 2010 season, and began playing it after touchdowns during the 2011 season.
- The Los Angeles Chargers, during their last few seasons in San Diego, played the song after a win. The Chargers now use it after a home sack or forcing a turnover.
- Twice used as the entrance song for UFC Light Heavyweight fighter Jason Brilz.
- The San Diego Padres used this song as the victory song at Petco Park in the early 2010's and again for the 2020 season.
- The Los Angeles Angels used this song whenever they hit a home run at home until 2022.
- Team Canada used this song whenever they scored a goal in the 2018 Winter Olympics
- The Providence Bruins of the AHL have used this as their goal song at home games since the 2015 - 2016 season
- The Stockton Heat of the AHL have used this as their goal song at home games during the 2019 - 20 AHL Season.
- The Official 9:15 Song for the Iron Order Motorcycle Club.

The professional wrestler Biff Busick has used this song on numerous occasions as his entrance song. His theme song in WWE, which he used under his "Oney Lorcan" moniker, was inspired by Bro Hymn.
