= Pennywise (disambiguation) =

Pennywise is the title character in the Stephen King novel It and its film and television adaptations.

Pennywise, Penny Wise, or Penny-wise may also refer to:

- Pennywise (band), an American punk rock band
  - Pennywise (album), a 1991 eponymous album by the band
    - "Pennywise" (song), the title song from the album
- Pennywise: The Story of IT, a documentary film about the It miniseries
- Jon Vitti (born 1960), American screenwriter who has used the pseudonym Penny Wise
- Penny-wise, an idiom related to the penny coin

== See also ==
- "Penny-Wiseguys", an episode of The Simpsons
