= Top Skater =

1997 video game

- Japanese arcade poster
- Developer: Sega AM3
- Publisher: Sega
- Director: Kenji Kanno
- Producer: Hisao Oguchi
- Platform: Arcade
- Release: JP: March 15, 1997; NA: March 1997; WW: May 1997
- Genres: Sports, racing
- Mode: Single player
- Arcade system: Sega Model 2

Top Skater is an arcade skateboarding sports video game released by Sega in 1997, and built on the Sega Model 2 hardware. It was one of the first arcade games to feature a skateboard controller interface. The game was directed by Kenji Kanno.

In Top Skater, players stand on a skateboard-like platform which swung side-to-side or tilted, manipulating the actions of the avatars in the game. The game has ramps, rails and other skating objects from which the player can do tricks to gain points. The player has a limited amount of time in which to perform tricks, but can extend this time by collecting time bonus rings or by performing certain tricks.

Kenji Kanno went on to create the Crazy Taxi series, which has similar character art design and music. Top Skater also served as a basic foundation for later skateboarding games including Activision's Tony Hawk's series. Top Skater had a sequel called Air Trix, released by Sega for arcades in 2001.

== Development ==
The game was directed by Kenji Kanno and produced by AM3 general manager Hisao Oguchi. The AM3 team wanted to make Top Skater a game which would allow players to explore unrealistically large skateboarding courses and perform the fantasy tricks associated with skateboarding's image, rather than a realistic simulation. Because of this, recreating some of the tricks for motion capture would require an unusually large studio with equipment to propel the motion capture actor through the air, so all the animation was done by hand. The primary target audience for the game was young Americans.

None of the development team members skateboarded; instead, they watched professional skateboarders both live and on video for research. An AM3 member explained the game's trick-based approach: "It wouldn't make any sense to make a skateboard racing game. You don't need to skateboard as fast as you can. I just wanted to make the game cool and fashionable. If the game were a racing game you wouldn't want to do any tricks as you'd be absorbed in trying to race as fast as possible."

The team collaborated with Sega AM4 in designing the skateboard interface and cabinet. They installed an MPEG board for the sound, since using MPEG boards had recently become more financially feasible.

== Soundtrack ==
The soundtrack of the game consisted entirely of these songs by the punk rock band Pennywise:

- "Society" (from the then newly released Full Circle)
- "Wouldn't It Be Nice" (from Pennywise)
- "Homesick" (from Unknown Road)
- "It's What You Do With It" (from About Time)
- "Dying To Know" (from Unknown Road)
- "Searching" (from About Time)
- "The Secret" (from Pennywise)
- "Try To Conform" (from Unknown Road)
- "Peaceful Day" (from About Time)
- "Perfect People" (from About Time)

The developers selected Pennywise because they felt punk rock was both the most appropriate genre for the skateboarding theme and the best choice to excite players, and some members of the team were fans of the group.

== Release ==
The game debuted at a Sega arcade show, held at the Otaku Entertainment Plaza in Kamata, Tokyo, on March 15, 1997. It was one of four Sega games introduced at the show. The game was presented by Kenji Kanno and Hisao Oguchi, who both demonstrated some of the game's tricks. The game made its North American debut the same month at Sega's GameWorks venue in Seattle. The main sponsor of the game was Coca-Cola.

== Reception ==
Upon its debut at the Otaku Entertainment Plaza, it was the most popular game at the show and drew long queues. In Japan, Game Machine listed Top Skater on their June 15, 1997 issue as being the third most-successful dedicated arcade game of the month. Next Generation reported in early 1998 that Top Skater sold "briskly" to U.S. arcade outlets.

The game received a positive critical response from Computer and Video Games magazine.

== Legacy ==
Kenji Kanno went on to create the Crazy Taxi series. Crazy Taxi (1999) has a similar style to Top Skater, notably the character art design and type of music. A sequel called Air Trix was released for the Sega Hikaru arcade system in 2001. Ollie King, published in 2004 and developed by the creators of the Jet Set Radio series, contains much of the same gameplay as Top Skater and used a nearly identical arcade cabinet.

Activision's Tony Hawk's series was inspired by Top Skater. While developing the original Tony Hawk's Pro Skater (1999), the Neversoft development team spent lunch breaks at a bowling alley near the studio, where they would play and study from Top Skater in the arcade. Members of the team were fans of Top Skater, the design of which served as a strong basic influence.

== See also ==
- Crazy Taxi
- Street Sk8er
- Tony Hawk: Ride
