= After the Fall (98 Mute album) =

Studio album by 98 Mute
- Released: April 9, 2002
- Recorded: Stall #2, Redondo Beach, California, U.S.
- Genre: Hardcore punk
- Length: 36:09
- Label: Epitaph
- Producers: Fletcher Dragge, Darian Rundall

98 Mute chronology
Slow Motion Riot (2000)	After the Fall (2002)

Professional ratings
Review scores
Source	Rating
AllMusic	4/5 stars
Punknews	3/5 stars

After the Fall is the fourth and final studio album from American hardcore punk band 98 Mute. It was released on April 9, 2002 by Epitaph Records. All of their albums were co-produced by Fletcher Dragge of the band Pennywise. It was released on enhanced CD containing a band bio, photos and an exclusive video interview followed by a live rendition of Black Flag's "No Values".

== Overview ==
On this recording, the band continued the musical progression which began on Class Of 98 and grew through Slow Motion Riot. The production was more raw, but the heaviness of the previous album had been toned down a tad. The positive lyrical themes which the band had become known for were also evident again.

== Track listing ==
- All songs written by 98 Mute
1. "Something In The Water" – 2:44
2. "Bullet For You" – 3:24
3. "M.A.D." – 3:15
4. "True To Yourself" – 2:38
5. "They Say" – 2:42
6. "Where Did It All Go Wrong" – 2:43
7. "Ultimate High" – 2:32
8. "Injection" – 2:29
9. "Not Enough" – 2:46
10. "Man Of The Hour" – 2:39
11. "Small Minds" – 2:14
12. "End Of Time" – 2:44
13. "Same Old Song And Dance" – 3:19

== Personnel ==
- Pat Ivie – vocals
- Jason Page – guitar
- Doug Weems – bass
- Justin Thirsk – drums
- Recorded at Stall #2, Redondo Beach, California, USA
- Produced and mixed by Fletcher Dragge and Darian Rundall
- Engineered by Darian Rundall
- Mastered by Gene Grimaldi at Oasis Mastering
