= The Joykiller (album) =

Studio album by the Joykiller
- Released: 1995
- Genre: Punk rock
- Length: 33:05
- Label: Epitaph
- Producer: Thom Wilson

The Joykiller chronology
The Joykiller (1995)	Static (1996)

The Joykiller is the debut album by the American punk supergroup the Joykiller, released in 1995. The songs were written by Jack Grisham. The cover art is by Frank Kozik. The band supported the album by touring with Pennywise.

== Critical reception ==
Trouser Press wrote: "A speedy collection of full-bore punkish rock, it wouldn’t have much character if not for Grisham's melodramatic vocals." The Milwaukee Journal Sentinel said that many of the songs examine "the messy consequences of personal need, romantic and otherwise, instead of raging blindly at society."

== Track listing ==
=== CD issue ===
No.	Title	Length
1.	"Love You More Dead"	2:12
2.	"Show Me the System"	2:07
3.	"We Got a God"	1:59
4.	"Seventeen"	3:28
5.	"I Wanna Drink Over You"	2:02
6.	"Go Bang"	2:27
7.	"The Other"	2:45
8.	"Monday"	1:35
9.	"She"	1:33
10.	"Unconscious"	3:03
11.	"Baby Sitter"	2:44
12.	"Nobody's Here to Stay"	2:03
13.	"Never Come Back to Me"	1:48
14.	"Less Than Crazy"	1:07
15.	"She's Having Fun"	2:06
Total length:		33:05
