= Robbie Allen (musician) =

American bassist and guitarist

Robbie Allen, also known as Rob Rule, is an American bassist and guitarist from Seal Beach, California. He has played with Tender Fury, The Vandals, One Hit Wonder, Candlebox, and as a live member of the Red Hot Chili Peppers.

== Career ==
Allen grew up in Seal Beach, California. He began playing in bands in the 1980s as a member of Jack Grisham's Cathedral of Tears. He also played bass for Grisham in Tender Fury, before forming the band Gypsy Trash with Grisham's sister D.D. Wood. Following this, he played bass for The Vandals on their 1989 album Slippery When Ill. In 1992, he sang backing vocals on Rikk Agnew's solo album Turtle. He also recorded with Rat Scabies on a project that was never released, before forming the band One Hit Wonder.

Allen left One Hit Wonder in 1993 to record an album "She Gets Too High" for Mercury Records under the moniker "Rob Rule". The album was produced by Don Gehman, and as part of its promotion, he opened for Dada and Candlebox.

During this time, Allen made his primary living as a guitar tech for the Red Hot Chili Peppers. Occasionally he played with the band as a live guitarist and backup singer, and opened shows for them as a solo act, sometimes with Chad Smith drumming. In 1996, Allen recorded the album Monkey on Rico as part of the band Thermadore, a project that featured Chad Smith, Josh Freese, and Stone Gossard. Allen served as Thermadore's lead singer and songwriter. He teamed up with Jack Grisham again in 1996, singing backing vocals on Joykiller's album Static.

Allen joined Candlebox after their album Happy Pills was released, playing guitar for them from 1998 until their split in 2000. He would continue to work with Candlebox singer Kevin Martin as a composer and background vocalist on Martin's 2003 album The Possibility of Being. In 2008, he released his own solo album Artificial Horizon.

In 2017, Allen played in an act called "Cowboy and Indian" with Antoine Arvizu and Sublime bassist Eric Wilson. The trio opened for Mike Watt.
