= All or Nothing (Pennywise album) =

Studio album by Pennywise
- Released: May 1, 2012
- Recorded: October 2011–January 2012
- Genres: Punk rock, melodic hardcore, skate punk
- Length: 37:16
- Label: Epitaph
- Producer: Cameron Webb

Pennywise chronology
Reason to Believe (2008)	All or Nothing (2012)	Yesterdays (2014)

Singles from All or Nothing
- 1. "All or Nothing" Released: March 7, 2012; 2. "Let Us Hear Your Voice" Released: April 17, 2012

All or Nothing is the tenth studio album by the American punk rock band Pennywise, which was released on May 1, 2012. It is Pennywise's first album since Reason to Believe (2008), their longest gap to date between studio albums. This is also the band's only recording with vocalist Zoli Téglás, who replaced Jim Lindberg from February 2010 to October 2012, as well as their first release on Epitaph Records since 2005's The Fuse (although their previous album was released on that label in Europe). "Let Us Hear Your Voice" impacted radio on April 17, 2012. The song Revolution was used in the 2012 Video Game WWE '13.

== Background ==
In November 2009, Punknews.org reported that the band were planning to release a new album by early 2010. On February 8, 2010, it was announced that Zoltán Téglás of Ignite would handle vocals for Pennywise's upcoming touring engagements. Later that month, Téglás was formally announced as the band's new vocalist; they played a few West Coast US shows in March 2010. Bassist Randy Bradbury said Téglás brought "to the table a tremendous vocal ability, creativity, and a die hard work ethic". In April 2010, the band appeared at the Groezrock festival in Belgium and then embarked on a European tour with Strike Anywhere and A Wilhelm Scream. In July and August 2010, the band performed on the Warped Tour.

== Reception ==
The album debuted at number 66 on the Canadian Albums Chart, and was generally well-received by fans.

The song "Revolution" is the official theme for the wrestling game WWE 13. The song "Let Us Hear Your Voice" was featured in an episode of The CW game show Oh Sit!.

== Track listing ==
1. "All or Nothing" – 2:29
2. "Waste Another Day" – 2:22
3. "Revolution" – 3:25
4. "Stand Strong" – 3:10
5. "Let Us Hear Your Voice" – 3:43
6. "Seeing Red" – 2:54
7. "Songs of Sorrow" – 3:35
8. "X Generation" – 3:15
9. "We Have It All" – 2:59
10. "Tomorrow" – 3:17
11. "All Along" – 3:09
12. "United" – 2:49
13. "The Fallen" – 3:17 [Deluxe edition / Australian release of the CD]
14. "Locked In" – 2:23 [Deluxe edition only]

== Personnel ==
- Zoli Téglás – vocals
- Fletcher Dragge – guitar
- Randy Bradbury – bass
- Byron McMackin – drums

== Charts ==
Chart performance for All or Nothing
Chart (2012)	Peak position
Australian Albums (ARIA)	27
Austrian Albums (Ö3 Austria)	69
Belgian Albums (Ultratop Flanders)	185
German Albums (Offizielle Top 100)	49
Swiss Albums (Schweizer Hitparade)	34
US Billboard 200	76
US Independent Albums (Billboard)	10
