= Reason to Believe (Pennywise album) =

Studio album by Pennywise
- Released: March 25, 2008
- Recorded: October 2007 – January 2008
- Studios: Maple, Santa Ana, California; NRG, North Hollywood, California
- Genres: Punk rock, melodic hardcore
- Length: 41:55
- Labels: MySpace, Epitaph
- Producer: Cameron Webb

Pennywise chronology
The Fuse (2005)	Reason to Believe (2008)	All or Nothing (2012)

Singles from Reason to Believe
- 1. "The Western World" Released: February 2008; 2. "Die for You" Released: September 30, 2008; 3. "One Reason" Released: March 31, 2009

Reason to Believe is the ninth studio album by the American punk rock band Pennywise, which was released on March 25, 2008 as a worldwide free digital download on MySpace. MySpace Records released the album within the United States as a standard CD and a limited-edition vinyl version with two bonus tracks not available in any other format. The album was available in Europe on March 24 through Epitaph Records. Originally to be released in 2007 based on the two-year gaps between the last eight studio albums, a tentative title for the album was Free for the People, but the title was scrapped.

Some copies of this album have the Parental Advisory label on the cover. This was the first time a Pennywise album would have a Parental Advisory label on an album cover, even though many of their albums contain profanity.

Reason to Believe peaked at #98 in the United States on the Billboard 200, and #46 in Australia on the ARIA Albums Chart, the band's second lowest position on that chart since their 1995 album About Time.

Reason to Believe was the last Pennywise album to feature Jim Lindberg on vocals until his return in October 2012.

== Writing and production ==
In September 2005, it was reported that Pennywise were planning to return to the studio in 2006 to begin work on their next album after The Fuse tour. In May 2006, it was also reported that the album was intended to contain songs that were not on the previous album. It was later revealed that one such song was "Brag, Exaggerate & Lie".

In an October 2006 interview, guitarist Fletcher Dragge stated that "everyone's been already working on songs" and Pennywise would get "together in the next coming months and put all the songs together". In that interview, he also predicted that the album would be out "before next summer or in next summer".

In September 2007, it was reported that Dragge also stated in interview at the Warped Tour that the band had approximately 60 new songs and would spend the Fall "arguing" over which thirteen to include on the album.

In October 2007, it was reported that Pennywise were back in the studio, where Dragge said they were "working on some new shit". It was also reported that Randy Bradbury wrote most of the songs and the album was intended to be more of an "old school" Pennywise album.

== Promotion and release ==
In November 2007, it was revealed that the band would release the album free through a partnership between MySpace Records, and Textango, a mobile music distributor. On February 3, 2008, the album's title was revealed and its artwork was posted online. On February 14, 2008, "Something to Live For" was made available for streaming via Alternative Press. Three days later, the album's track listing was revealed. "The Western World" was posted as a free download through KROQ's website on March 11, 2008. On March 22, 2008, Reason to Believe was made available for streaming through their Myspace, and released three days later. MySpace Records issued it in the US, while Epitaph Records handled the European territories.

As of March 2008, according to an OC Register report, Reason to Believe has been downloaded more than 400,000 times, making it one of Pennywise's most successful albums since their 2001 breakthrough Land of the Free?.

In April 2008, the band performed at the Punk Spring festival in Japan and toured Australia with Sum 41, the Vandals and Bowling for Soup. In May 2008, the band embarked on a cross-country tour with Strung Out, who headlined some of the shows, and Authority Zero. A music video for "The Western World" was posted online on May 21. In July and August 2008, the band performed on Warped Tour again. In September and October, the band at a series of radio festivals. "Die for You" was released to radio on September 30. In February 2009, the band went on a brief tour of the west coast. "One Reason" was released to radio on March 31. In April and May, the band co-headlined the Jagermeister Music Tour with Pepper. Further dates were added, extending the tour into June 2009; after its conclusion, the band performed at the West Coast Riot festival in Sweden.

== Reception ==
Professional ratings
Review scores
Source	Rating
AbsolutePunk.net	71% link
AllMusic	link
Mammothpress.com	link

The album received widespread critical acclaim upon its release, earning a rating of 4 out of 5 on AllMusic.

"The Western World" debuted at number 28 on the Modern Rock Tracks chart (and remaining in the Top 40 for 20 weeks), marking the highest initial charting single in the band's career.

== Track listing ==
No.	Title	Length
1.	"(Intro) As Long as We Can"	3:09
2.	"One Reason"	2:55
3.	"Faith and Hope"	3:04
4.	"Something to Live For"	2:38
5.	"All We Need"	2:48
6.	"The Western World"	3:08
7.	"We'll Never Know"	2:42
8.	"Confusion"	3:01
9.	"Nothing to Lose"	2:57
10.	"It's Not Enough to Believe"	2:38
11.	"You Get the Life You Choose"	2:52
12.	"Affliction"	3:19
13.	"Brag, Exaggerate & Lie"	2:04
14.	"Die for You"	3:40
Total length:		41:55

Epitaph and Japanese CD release bonus track
No.	Title	Length
15.	"Next in Line"	3:09

Vinyl release bonus tracks
No.	Title	Length
15.	"Next in Line"	3:09
16.	"One Nation"	2:48

Digital download bonus track
No.	Title	Length
15.	"Just One More Day"	3:18

== Personnel ==
- Jim Lindberg – vocals
- Fletcher Dragge – guitar
- Randy Bradbury – bass
- Byron McMackin – drums

== Charts ==
Chart performance for Reason to Believe
Chart (2008)	Peak position
Australian Albums (ARIA)	46
Swiss Albums (Schweizer Hitparade)	97
US Billboard 200	98
US Independent Albums (Billboard)	12
