= Humble Gods =

American punk rock band

- Origin: Hermosa Beach, California, U.S.
- Genres: Punk rock
- Years active: 1990–1997, 2003–2009
- Labels: Suburban Noize, WEA, Hollywood
- Past members: Brad "Daddy X" Xavier; Doug Carrion; Josh Freese; Jason Thirsk; Bianca Halstead; Ricky Vodka; Lou Dogg; Spike Xavier; Byron McKrackin

Humble Gods was a punk rock band from Hermosa Beach, California. Kottonmouth Kings' frontman Daddy X created the band. On October 17, 1995, the band released its debut self-titled album Humble Gods on WEA. The band had a number of members come and go throughout its career, including two untimely deaths. Daddy X is also the vocalist of the punk rock/hip-hop groups X-Pistols and Kottonmouth Kings, and former vocalist of the skate punk band Doggy Style. He also has a solo hip-hop career.

== History ==
The band's membership consisted of: Daddy X, Doug Carrion, Byron McMackin, Josh Freeze, Scott Koziol, and Brad Gordon. Past members include: Jason Thirsk of Pennywise, Bianca Halstead, Ricky Vodka (of Motochrist), Spike Xavier (Mind Over Four) and Lou Dog (of the Kottonmouth Kings). Jason Thirsk only recorded one album with Humble Gods, No Heroes. Thirsk had been in rehabilitation for alcoholism and also suffered from depression. Shortly after recording the album he died of a self-inflicted gunshot wound July 29, 1996, at the age of 28. Their debut album Humble Gods was released October 17, 1995, on WEA. Their second album No Heroes was released October 15, 1996, on Hollywood Records. The bassist on the album, Bianca Halstead, was killed in a car accident in New Orleans while on tour with the all-female band Betty Blowtorch. Humble Gods ended up disbanding in 1997, causing Daddy X to refocus on Kottonmouth Kings, with the group going on to become one of the most popular independent hip hop groups of the 2000s. In 2003, Humble Gods re-formed, and later released their third album, Born Free on January 6, 2004, on Suburban Noize Records.

== Past members ==
- Daddy X – vocals
- Doug Carrion – guitar, bass
- Josh Freese – drums
- Jason Thirsk (deceased) – bass
- Bianca Halstead (deceased) – guitar
- Ricky Vodka – guitar, vocals
- Lou Dog – drums
- Spike Xavier – bass
- Byron McMackin – drums

== Discography ==
Album	Release date	Label
Humble Gods	October 17, 1995	WEA
No Heroes	October 15, 1996	Hollywood Records
Born Free	January 6, 2004	Suburban Noize Records
