= Rare Bird Films =

Rare Bird Films started in 2008 as a collaboration between Cristan Crocker Reilly and Andrea Blaugrund Nevins. Reilly had read Punk Rock Dad written by childhood friend Jim Lindberg of the punk band Pennywise and approached Nevins about creating a documentary. The meeting led to the production of The Other F Word exploring punk rockers who moved on to fatherhood. It was Nevins' feature length directorial debut.

== Founders ==
Cristan Crocker worked as an actress in series television and film including Matlock and Doogie Howser, MD. She was mentioned in a 1993 review in Variety of Sworn to Vengeance, a CBS TV movie. She was also in the 1990s action film The Bad Pack as Carmen.

Andrea Blaugrund Nevins has credits as a director, producer, and a writer. She graduated from Harvard University worked at National Public Radio and produced shows for Peter Jennings and won an Emmy Award. She produced biographies on Jesse Jackson and Hillary Clinton for A&E winning awards for both productions. She was nominated for an Oscar in 1998 for the category Best Documentary Short Subjects for Still Kicking: The Fabulous Palm Springs Follies.

Crocker and Nevins, both mothers, met through their husbands, Kevin Reilly of Fox Broadcasting TNT/TBS and David Nevins of Showtime.

== Projects ==
Rare Bird Films most recent project is the Hulu Original, "Tiny Shoulders: Rethinking Barbie" which premiered at the 2018 Tribeca Film Festival in the US, at Hot Docs in Canada, and began airing on Hulu in April, 2018. In the film, Andrea Nevins uses Barbie, the toy icon, as a lens to examine the past 60 years of feminism in the United States. The film weaves interviews with feminists and historians like Gloria Steinem, Roxane Gay, Peggy Orenstein and Amanda Foreman with a behind-the-scene look at how a toy giant attempts to reinvent a doll that embodied an antiquated perception of femininity. The United States State Department chose "Tiny Shoulders" as part of its 2018 film diplomacy program, American Film Showcase. The program brings award-winning contemporary documentaries and directors to audiences around the world offering a view of American society through the perspective of independent filmmakers.

Quincy, which premiered on Netflix in September 2018, is a close look at music impresario Quincy Jones as told from the singular viewpoint of his daughter Rashida Jones. Andrea Nevins and Cristan Crocker are associate producers on this project.

Play it Forward was selected as the Opening Gala film for the 2015 Tribeca/ESPN Sports Film Festival, part of the larger Tribeca Film Festival. It is the story of future Hall of Fame tight end Tony Gonzalez who was mentored by his older brother Chris, who had wanted to play football more than Tony but never could, after a childhood injury. The story examines family sacrifice and a bond between brothers.

State of Play:Happiness is a 35-minute documentary made for Peter Berg's HBO series that explores the lives of three former NFL greats, quarterback Brett Favre, running back Tiki Barber and wide receiver Wayne Chrebet. Nevins and Reilly made the project in partnership with Michael Strahan and Constance Schwartz of SMAC Entertainment.

The Other F Word a 99-minute documentary Filmmaker Andrea Blaugrund Nevins explores the lives of punk rock dads. The film crew consisted of only three people: Reilly, Nevins, and Geoffrey Franklin who worked as cinematographer, editor, and sound recorder. Reilly said the small crew allowed for more intimate and personal reactions from the subjects. Rocker dads featured included: Lindberg who was involved in the Southern California punk scene; Flea of the Red Hot Chili Peppers who had previously played in a band called Fear; and Mark Hoppus of blink-182.

The film provides an extraordinary chronicle of the origins of the violent LA punk scene which originated in Hermosa Beach in the late '70s. In an article on The Huffington Post, Andrea Nevins stated, "Growing up in New York City … I used to cross the street to avoid punk rockers." She wrote that she learned that beneath the hard exterior "is a poet, a perceptive and tender soul who sees and feels deeply, and reacts accordingly." The narrative is based on Lindberg's book but Nevins used anecdotes from "tons of punk rock dads" to round out the production. In June 2014, The Tribeca Film Festival listed the Other F Word on its website as one of 7 documentaries to stream with your dad on Father's Day.
