= The Western World =

Single by Pennywise

from the album Reason to Believe
- Released: May 2008
- Recorded: October 2007–January 2008
- Genre: Punk rock, melodic hardcore
- Length: 3:11
- Label: MySpace, Epitaph
- Songwriter(s): Jim Lindberg, Fletcher Dragge, Byron McMackin, Randy Bradbury
- Producer(s): Cameron Webb

Pennywise singles chronology
| "Knocked Down" (2005) | "The Western World" (2008) | "Die for You" (2008) |

"The Western World" is the sixth track from Pennywise's ninth studio album Reason to Believe. It was the album's first single, which also reached number 22 on the Modern Rock Tracks chart, marking the highest initial charting single in Pennywise's career. It also had success in the Peruvian's rock chart, debuting at number one; it stayed in that position for four weeks.

== Music video ==
The video starts with identical supermodels playing the song as other models walk along the catwalk. Businessmen are waving money in the air as the models walk. It is revealed that the models are not actual humans, but robots (gynoids/cyborgs/synthetic humans; it is not revealed which) made by scientists behind a curtain. It then shows SWAT team members holding back "normal" people. The video is interspersed with images of scientists working on the models, and becoming increasingly involved in the song, as more of them start to pump the air with their fists, and chant the song. Back in the lab behind the scenes, one of the models being created suddenly sits up from the operating table, as the crowd outside breaches the SWAT barricade, and presumably storms the stage, tearing off her connectors, and escapes while the scientists are chanting the song. She runs along an alleyway, and opens up a door in panic, revealing the band tied and gagged. The video then cuts to the catwalk, transformed into a stage for the band (with the audience consisting of both the businessmen, still waving money, and the crowd from outside), with the escaped model handing the singer his microphone, then disappearing backstage, as the band performs the rest of the song. Flashes follow where the lab is show being vandalized by unknown assailants, possibly the people held back by the SWAT teams previously. The video ends showing the microphone lying on the stage, thrown down by the singer.
