= Slow Motion Riot =

Studio album by 98 Mute
- Released: June 6, 2000
- Recorded: Stall #2, Redondo Beach, California, U.S.
- Genre: Hardcore punk
- Length: 47:34
- Label: Epitaph Records
- Producer: Fletcher Dragge; Darian Rundall

98 Mute chronology
Class of 98 (1998)	Slow Motion Riot (2000)	After the Fall (2002)

Professional ratings
Review scores
Source	Rating
AllMusic	4/5 stars
Punknews	2/5 stars

Slow Motion Riot is the third studio album by American hardcore punk band, 98 Mute. It was released on Epitaph Records on June 6, 2000. It followed their 1998 album, Class Of 98, and in 2002, After the Fall marked their swansong as they split up shortly afterwards.

== Overview ==
The band's musical development saw them slow down and lengthen their songs considerably. The guitars are heavier and have a more downtuned tone. The lyrics have been variously described as "uplifting", "feel good" and "positive".

== Track listing ==
- All songs written by 98 Mute
1. "Slow Motion Riot" – 2:57
2. "Could This Be" – 3:15
3. "Hit You Back" – 3:23
4. "Fight Of Your Life" – 3:09
5. "If We Quit" – 2:54
6. "Send In The Clowns" – 3:24
7. "Survive" – 2:44
8. "Judge & Jury" – 3:22
9. "Crack" – 2:44
10. "Simpler Days" – 3:11
11. "Never Forget" – 3:12
12. "You Can't Lose" – 3:26
13. "Count On Me" – 2:43
14. "Wounds" – 3:28
15. "It's Your Move" – 3:42

== Personnel ==
- Pat Ivie – vocals
- Jason Page – guitar
- Doug Weems – bass
- Justin Thirsk – drums
- Recorded at Stall #2, Redondo Beach, California, USA
- Produced and mixed by Fletcher Dragge and Darian Rundall
- Engineered by Darian Rundall
- Mastered at Oasis Mastering
