= Fuck Authority =

Single by Pennywise

from the album Land of the Free?
- Released: July 2001
- Genre: Punk rock
- Length: 3:16
- Label: Epitaph Records
- Songwriter(s): Jim Lindberg, Fletcher Dragge, Byron McMackin, Randy Bradbury
- Producer(s): Pennywise, Joe Barresi

Pennywise singles chronology
"Victim of Reality" (2000)	"Fuck Authority" (2001)	"Divine Intervention" (2001)

"Fuck Authority" is a song written and recorded by American punk rock band Pennywise. It was released in July 2001 as the lead single (and only charting single) from the band's sixth studio album Land of the Free?. The song reached number 38 on the Modern Rock Tracks chart.

== Music video ==
The music video was directed by Glen Bennett and was released in April 2001. While the video shows the band playing on a stage with an upside-down American flag behind them, it features different scenes of riots and historical places, such as Tiananmen Square.

== Charts ==
Chart (2001)	Peak position
U.S. Billboard Modern Rock Tracks	38
