= One Hit Wonder (band) =

American punk band

- Origin: Long Beach, California, United States
- Genres: Punk rock, power pop
- Years active: 1993–1999
- Labels: Rockworld Records; Lethal Records; Nitro Records
- Members: Dan Root; Chris Webb; Daniel Gadberry; Trey Pangborn
- Past members: Randy Bradbury; Ray "Bones" Rodriguez; Robbie Allen

One Hit Wonder was an American punk band, from Long Beach, California.

The bands original line-up featured singer/guitarists Dan Root and Robbie Allen, bassist Randy Bradbury, and drummer Christopher Webb. Root, Allen and Bradbury (after Allen left) had previously played together in Tender Fury, while Webb had been the drummer of No Doubt.

In 1993, Allen left the band, after recording the single "Long Beach vs. the World". Their debut EP was issued in 1995, and was produced by the Robb Brothers. After the death of Jason Thirsk in 1996, Randy Bradbury left to join Pennywise and was replaced by Daniel Gadberry. Former pro-skater Ray "Bones" Rodriguez also joined the band on guitar and they released their debut EP Where's the World in 1994.

Front man Dan Root is currently the guitarist in Adolescents. He is credited with recording and playing guitar with Tender Fury, Rik L Rik, Cathedral of Tears, Keith Morris' band Buglamp, Adolescents, C.J. Ramone, The Vandals, and appearing in the 1987 movie Dudes and "Me First and the Gimme Gimmes". Randy Bradbury played bass on the first two One Hit Wonder albums, before leaving to join the skate punk band Pennywise. Chris Webb previously played drums for the alternative rock band No Doubt, but never appeared on any albums. Trey Pangborn from the Falling Idols, Bargain Music, and later Long Beach ShortBus played guitar.

On October 6, 2016, One Hit Wonder played in Long Beach with The Cadillac Tramps.

== Line up ==
- Dan Root - vocals/guitar
- Daniel Gadberry - bass
- Chris Webb - drums
- Trey Pangborn - guitar

== Discography ==
- Where's the World? (EP) (1994)
- Clusterphukastuff (1996)
- Outfall (1997)
- Who the Hell Is One Hit Wonder? (1998)
