= No Heroes (Humble Gods album) =

Studio album by Humble Gods
- Released: October 15, 1996
- Genre: Punk rock, skate Punk
- Length: 50:14
- Label: Hollywood Records

Humble Gods chronology
Humble Gods (1995)	No Heroes (1996)	Born Free (2004)

Professional ratings
Review scores
Source	Rating
AllMusic	2/5 stars

No Heroes is the second studio album by the California punk rock band Humble Gods, released on October 15, 1996. This album follows their 1995 debut release Humble Gods. No Heroes was released on Hollywood Records, and has a few of the same songs as the band's first release.

== Track listing ==
1. "Fucked Up" – (words: Brad X / music: Doug Carrion) – 2:41 (Already present on Humble Gods)
2. "Lied And Cheated" – (words: Brad X / music: Doug Carrion) – 2:46
3. "American Dream" – (words: Brad X, Spike X / music: Doug Carrion) – 2:09 (Already present on Humble Gods)
4. "Price Tag" – (words: Brad X, Ricky Vodka / music: Doug Carrion) – 2:47
5. "Glad I'm Not You" – (words and music: Ricky Vodka) – 2:38 (Already present on Humble Gods)
6. "Running Out Of Time" – (words: Brad X / music: Doug Carrion) – 2:57 (Already present on Humble Gods)
7. "No Heroes" – (words: Brad X, Ricky Vodka / music: Doug Carrion) – 2:41
8. "American Girl" – (words and music: Tom Petty) – 3:15
9. "Matter Of Time" – (words: Brad X / music: Doug Carrion) – 2:08
10. "Mary's In Bondage Pants" – (words: Brad X, Ricky Vodka / music: Spike X, Ricky Vodka) – 2:29
11. "High Speed" – (words and music: Ricky Vodka) – 1:22 (Already present on Humble Gods)
12. "Surrender" – (words: Ricky Vodka / music: Doug Carrion) – 2:27
13. "Animal" – (words and music: Ricky Vodka) – 2:09 (Already present on Humble Gods)
14. "Paralyzed" – (words: Ricky Vodka / music: Doug Carrion) – 2:51
15. "Twisted" – (words: Brad X / music: Doug Carrion) – 4:05
16. "Running Out Of Time (ICP Mix)" – (words: Brad X / music: Doug Carrion) – 10:49

== Personnel ==
- Daddy X – vocals
- Doug Carrion – guitar
- Ricky Vodka – guitar
- Jason Thirsk – bass
- Lou Dog – drums
