= Tender Fury =

American punk rock band

Tender Fury was an American hard rock and punk rock band from Long Beach, CA formed in 1987 and active until their disbandment in 1993. Jack Grisham and Todd Barnes of T.S.O.L. were founding members of Tender Fury, and while Barnes was only active through 1990, Grisham remained the original founding member throughout the band's lifetime. Other prominent members of the band included Dan Root Robbie Allen, Hunt Sales, Randy Bradbury, Josh Freese, and Frank Agnew.

Tender Fury released three albums over the course of their career; their first self-titled album (1987) on Posh Boy Records, and their sophomore album Garden of Evil (1989) and final album If Anger Were Soul, I'd Be James Brown (1991) on Triple X Records. After the dissolution of the band in 1993, Grisham went on to form The Joykiller and the eventual re-formation of T.S.O.L.'s original lineup (minus Barnes, who died in 1999).

If Anger Were Soul is cited by Grisham in a 2013 interview as being a turning point in his career in terms of serious devotion to making music in the aftermath of substance abuse recovery. The material from this album served as the band's set list for the last concert at the now-defunct Huntington Beach-based punk and alternative rock venue Night Moves.

== Band members ==
- Jack Grisham - Vocals (1988 - 1993)
- Todd Barnes - Drums (1988 - 1990)
- Robbie Allen - Bass (1988 - 1990)
- Daniel Root - Guitar (1988 - 1993)
- Hunt Sales - Drums (1990 - 1991)
- Randy Bradbury - Bass (1990 - 1993)
- Josh Freese - Drums (1991)
- Ronnie King - Keyboard (1991)
- Frank Agnew - Guitar / Vocals (1991 - 1992)
- Chris Webb - Drums (1991 - 1993)
- Tony Scalzo - Guitar (1992)

== Discography ==
=== Studio albums ===
- Tender Fury (1988) on Posh Boy Records
- Garden of Evil (1989) on Emergo & Triple X Records
- If Anger Were Soul, I'd Be James Brown (1991) on Triple X Records

=== Singles ===
- "Garden of Evil" (1989) 7", Emergo
- "(Desperate And) Looking For The Chip" (1989) 12" Maxi, Triple X Records

=== Compilations ===
- Thoughts of Yesterday: 1981-1982 (1992) on Rhino Records
