= The Black Pacific =

American punk rock band

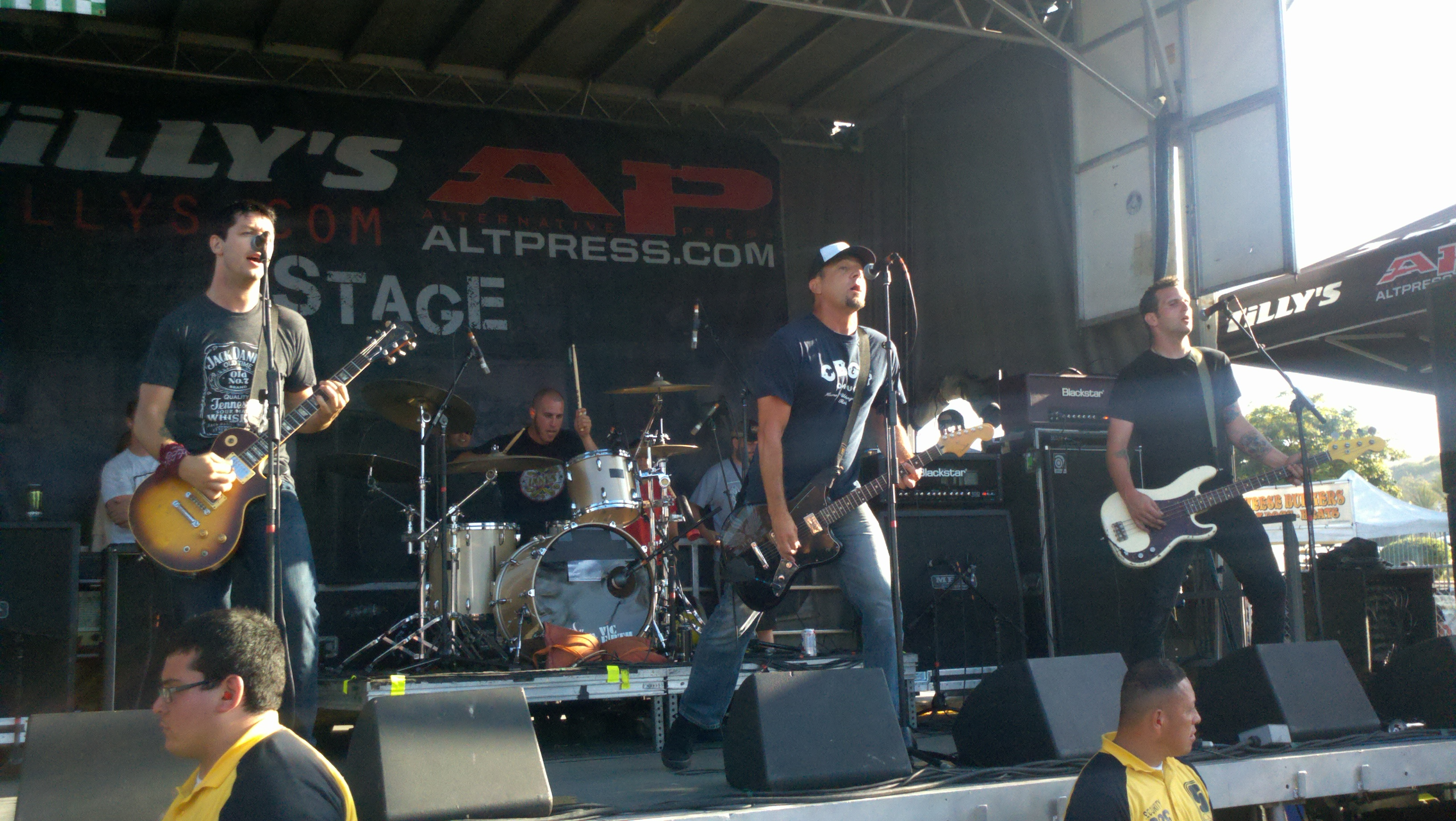
- The Black Pacific performing on the 2011 Warped Tour. Left to right: Orrell, Vega, Lindberg, and Caswell.

Background information
- Origin: Hermosa Beach, California, U.S.
- Genre: Punk rock
- Years active: 2010–2012, 2023–present
- Label: SideOneDummy
- Members: Jim Lindberg; Alan Vega
- Past members: Davey Latter; Gavin Caswell; Marc Orrell
- Website: blackpacificband.com

The Black Pacific is an American punk rock music project that was started in 2010 by Jim Lindberg, the vocalist of Pennywise, and two previously unknown members, Alan Vega (drums) and Davey Latter (bass). They were signed to SideOneDummy Records and their self-titled debut album was released on September 14, 2010.

On October 8, 2010, some line-up changes were announced by the band: Marc Orrell, formerly of celtic punk band Dropkick Murphys has joined the band as second guitarist, and Gavin Caswell has joined as bassist, replacing Davey Latter who had to return to his drumming duties with his other band Everest.

In June 2010 (shortly after the completion of their first album), Jim announced that the Black Pacific had plans to release more music in the future. He also remarked that they had more songs written than could fit on their first album, and that (in June 2010) they had another batch of songs ready to record.

In August 2024 they announced their second album Here Comes Our Wave and released a single titled I Think I'm Paranoid.

On September 20, 2024, The Black Pacific released its second record, "Here Comes Our Wave" through Toronto-based label Dine Alone Records.

== Band members ==
Current members

- Jim Lindberg - lead vocals, guitar (2010–2012, 2024–present)
- Alan Vega - drums, percussion (2010–2012, 2024–present)

Former members

- Davey Latter - bass (2010)
- Gavin Caswell - bass (2010–2012)
- Marc Orrell - guitar (2010–2012)

== Discography ==
=== Studio albums ===
- The Black Pacific (2010)
- Here Comes Our Wave (2024)

=== Music videos ===
- "The System" (2010)
- "Living with Ghosts" (2010)
- "I Think I'm Paranoid" (2024)
- "Best Day Ever" (2024)
