= Class of 98 =

Class Of 98

Studio album by 98 Mute
- Released: June 2, 1998
- Recorded: December 1997; Icebone Studios, Redondo Beach, California, U.S.
- Genre: Hardcore punk
- Length: 35:19
- Label: Theologian Records
- Producer: Fletcher Dragge

98 Mute chronology
98 Mute (1996)	Class Of 98 (1998)	Slow Motion Riot (2000)

Professional ratings
Review scores
Source	Rating
Allmusic	3/5 stars

Class of 98 is the second album by American hardcore punk band, 98 Mute. It was released on June 2, 1998, on Theologian Records. Like its predecessor, the self-titled debut, it was produced by Fletcher Dragge of the band, Pennywise and one of the tracks, "Picture This", was featured on Epitaph Records' Punk-O-Rama series of compilations as they left to join them.

== Overview ==
The style was considerably tamer than their debut effort with toned-down vocals and longer songs, all contributing to a more original sound. The songs were still played at a fast pace, but with more emphasis on melody and structure.

== Track listing ==
- All songs written by 98 Mute
1. "Ask Yourself" – 2:33
2. "How Do You Feel Now?" – 2:12
3. "Election Year" – 2:42
4. "Breakdown" – 2:30
5. "Shine" – 2:50
6. "Great Expectations" – 2:26
7. "Hangman" – 1:32
8. "Growing Old" – 1:56
9. "Perfect Sense" – 2:39
10. "Slander" – 2:44
11. "Short Fuse" – 2:14
12. "Open Your Eyes" – 2:54
13. "Picture This" – 2:06
14. "Watch Over Me" – 4:02

== Credits ==
- Pat Ivie – vocals
- Jason Page – guitar
- Doug Weems – bass
- Justin Thirsk – drums
- Recorded in December, 1997 at Icebone, Redondo Beach, California, US
- Produced by Fletcher Dragge
- Engineered by Darian Rundall
- Mixed by Fletcher Dragge and Darian Rundall at Total Access, Redondo Beach, California
- Mastered by Gene Grimaldi at Oasis Mastering
