= The Black Pacific (album) =

Studio album by The Black Pacific
- Released: September 14, 2010
- Recorded: 2010 at Airport Studios, Burbank California
- Genre: Punk rock
- Length: 32:49
- Label: SideOneDummy
- Producer: Shaun Lopez

The Black Pacific chronology
The Black Pacific (2010)	Here Comes Our Wave (2024)

The Black Pacific is the debut studio album by the American punk rock band of the same name, which was released on September 14, 2010. Two of their songs, "The System" and "When It's Over", are available for listening on their official website.

== Track listing ==
No.	Title	Length
1.	"The System"	2:43
2.	"When It's Over"	2:52
3.	"Living with Ghosts"	3:03
4.	"Time Is Not the Reason"	3:26
5.	"Almost Rising"	3:30
6.	"Kill Your Idols"	3:49
7.	"Defamer"	3:25
8.	"Ruinator"	2:51
9.	"Put Down Your Weapons"	3:14
10.	"No Purpose"	3:56

== Personnel ==
The Black Pacific

- Jim Lindberg - Vocals, guitar
- Davey Latter - Bass guitar, backing vocals
- Alan Vega - Drums, percussion

Artwork

- Industrial Intensio - Album Artwork
- Brent Broza - Photography

Production

- Shaun Lopez - Producer, engineer, mixing
- Johnny B. - Production Manager
- Eric Broyhill & Michael Hartley - Mastering

== Chart positions ==
Album

Year	Chart	Position
2010	Top Heatseekers	38
