= 98 Mute =

American hardcore punk band

- Origin: Hermosa Beach, California, United States
- Genres: Hardcore punk
- Years active: 1993–2002, 2016
- Labels: Theologian Records; Epitaph Records

98 Mute was an American hardcore punk band from Hermosa Beach, California, United States. They were formed in 1993, and signed to Theologian Records in 1995. Their first, self-titled album was released in 1996, and the band was featured on several skate videos and compilations of Californian punk. The group had toured with bands like The Offspring, Blink-182 and Pennywise. A second album on Theologian followed in 1998 before the group was picked up by Epitaph Records. They released two albums on Epitaph before breaking up in September 2002, shortly after the release of their fourth full-length, After the Fall.

98 Mute reunited in 2016.

== Band members ==
- Pat Ivie – vocals
- Jason Page – guitar
- Doug Weems – bass
- Justin Thirsk – drums

== Discography ==
Studio albums

- 98 Mute (Theologian Records, 1996)
- Class of 98 (Theologian Records, 1998)
- Slow Motion Riot (Epitaph Records, 2000)
- After the Fall (Epitaph Records, 2002)
