= Born Free (Humble Gods album) =

Studio album by Humble Gods
- Released: January 6, 2004
- Genre: Punk rock, skate punk, ska punk
- Length: 46:30
- Label: Suburban Noize

Humble Gods chronology
No Heroes (1996)	Born Free (2004)

Born Free is the third and final studio album from the California based punk rock band Humble Gods, and released on January 6, 2004, on Suburban Noize Records. There was an eight-year gap between this album and the band's previous release, No Heroes, because vocalist Daddy X was busy with his other band, Kottonmouth Kings.

== Track listing ==
1. "Destroy" - (Doug Carrion, Daddy X) - 2:17
2. "Another Day" - (Doug Carrion, Daddy X) - 3:24
3. "Who?s The Criminal" - (Doug Carrion, Daddy X) - 1:23
4. "Sickworld" - (Doug Carrion, Daddy X, Carrol) - 4:07
5. "Chinstraps" - (Doug Carrion, Daddy X) - 0:45
6. "Born Free" - (Doug Carrion, Daddy X) - 1:37
7. "Fools Paradise" - (Doug Carrion, Daddy X) - 3:52
8. "Alive & Rippin" - (Doug Carrion, Daddy X, Gaez) - 2:00
9. "Now" - (Doug Carrion, Daddy X) - 2:55
10. "Quiet As A Mouse" - (Ricky Vodka) - 2:48
11. "Stay On The Outside" - (Doug Carrion, Daddy X) - 2:27
12. "Don?t Label Me" - (Doug Carrion, Daddy X) - 5:19
13. "Media Manipulation" - (Doug Carrion, Daddy X) - 2:31
14. "Rescue Me" - (Doug Carrion, Daddy X, Gaez) - 2:24
15. "Long Way" - (Doug Carrion, Daddy X) - 3:37
16. "Subnoize Radio" - 0:45
17. "Irie Feelin" - (Doug Carrion, Daddy X) - 4:11 (Bonus track from Daddy X's album Organic Soul)

== Personnel ==
- Daddy X - lead vocals
- Doug Carrion - guitars, backing vocals, bass (1–9, 11, 13–16)
- Ricky Vodka - backing vocals
- Stoney Waters - spoken word (12)
- Brad Gordon - keyboards (4, 7, 9, 12, 15, 17)
- Scott Koziol - bass (10, 12, 17)
- Josh Freese - drums (1–7, 9, 15)
- Tom Brayton - drums (10, 12, 17)
- Byron McCracklin - drums (8, 11, 13, 14)
