= Jason Thirsk =

American bassist (1967–1996)

- Thirsk on stage with Pennywise in the mid-1990s

Background information
- Born: Jason Matthew Thirsk; December 25, 1967
- Origin: Hermosa Beach, California, U.S.
- Died: July 29, 1996 (aged 28)
- Genres: Punk rock; melodic hardcore; skate punk; hardcore punk
- Occupation: Musician
- Instruments: Vocals, bass
- Years active: 1986–1996
- Formerly of: Pennywise

Jason Matthew Thirsk (December 25, 1967 – July 29, 1996) was an American musician who was the bass player of the California punk rock band Pennywise from 1988 through his death in 1996. He grew up in Hermosa Beach, California.

Pennywise was formed in 1988 by Thirsk along with singer Jim Lindberg, guitarist Fletcher Dragge, and drummer Byron McMackin. Thirsk had been in rehabilitation for alcoholism and suffered from depression.

== Death and legacy ==
At the age of 28, he died of a self-inflicted gunshot wound. His girlfriend discovered his body approximately a day after his death.

The band decided to continue making music after Thirsk's death, first by dedicating their performances to him at Warped Tour 1996. They later brought in bass guitarist Randy Bradbury from One Hit Wonder. The band then set about writing an album of new material which was made up of mostly anti-suicide messages. One of Pennywise's most popular songs, "Bro Hymn", was originally written by Thirsk as a tribute to three of his friends: Tim Colvin, Carlos Canton, who died in a motorcycle accident, and Tom Nichols, who drowned at Hermosa Beach Pier in 1988. The band re-recorded the song after his death as a tribute to their fallen bandmate, replacing the line "Canton, Colvin, Nichols, this one's for you" with "Jason Matthew Thirsk, this one's for you", and renaming the track "Bro Hymn Tribute". It appears as the final track on the 1997 album Full Circle and a live version can also be found on Live @ the Key Club, released in 2000. Justin Thirsk, Jason's brother and drummer from 98 Mute, appears on the re-recording, both on drums and vocals.

== Thirsk's Pennywise discography ==
- A Word From the Wise (1989, EP)
- Wildcard (1989, EP)
- Pennywise (1991)
- A Word from the Wise/Wildcard (1992, compilation of the EPs)
- Unknown Road (1993)
- About Time (1995)
- Yesterdays (2014) *Contains previously unrecorded compositions by Thirsk.

and see also

- No Heroes (1996) Humble Gods (This was the last official recording to ever feature Jason Thirsk).
- Full Circle (1997, dedicated to him, also includes his own lyrics)
