= The Other F Word =

- Theatrical release poster
- Directed by: Andrea Blaugrund Nevins
- Written by: Andrea Blaugrund Nevins
- Produced by: Cristan Reilly; Andrea Nevins
- Starring: Tony Adolescent; Art Alexakis; Rob Chaos
- Edited by: Geoffrey Franklin
- Production company: Rare Bird Films
- Distributed by: Oscilloscope Laboratories (USA); Elephant Eye Films (International); Mongrel Media (Canada)
- Release date: November 6, 2011
- Running time: 98 minutes
- Country: United States
- Language: English
- Box office: $53,200

The Other F Word is a 2011 American documentary film directed by independent filmmaker Andrea Blaugrund Nevins. The film explores the world of aging punk rock musicians, as they transition into parenthood and try to maintain the contrast between their anti-authoritarian lifestyle with the responsibilities of fatherhood, the titular "other F word". In addition to interviewing over twenty musicians from across the spectrum of the punk genre, including Mark Hoppus of Blink 182 and Fat Mike of NOFX, the film also includes other emblematic figures of subculture such as professional skateboarder Tony Hawk, in a chronicle of the struggles and rewards that accompany raising their children.

It was released in the U.S. by Oscilloscope Laboratories in 2011.

== Premise ==
Primarily rotating around interviews of Pennywise lead singer Jim Lindberg, the documentary intermittently switches amongst different musicians, as it jumps between their travels on the road doing concert tours and time spent at home with their kids. In the course of the movie, the interviews are interspersed with archived concert footage of the punk rockers, from recent shows as well as their early years, to depict some of the challenges they face in their roles as parents - while at the same time maintaining their roles as anti-establishment figures for their punk rock fan following. Remarking that their adolescence often lacked much in the way of paternal guidance, the interviewees speak of how they earnestly are trying to be the supportive role models for their kids that they themselves never had while growing up.

Featured interviews with

- Tony Cadena - The Adolescents
- Art Alexakis - Everclear
- Rob Chaos - Total Chaos
- Joe Escalante - The Vandals
- Josh Freese - Session Drummer
- Fat Mike - NOFX
- Flea - Red Hot Chili Peppers, Fear
- Lars Frederiksen - Rancid
- Matt Freeman - Rancid
- Jack Grisham - TSOL
- Brett Gurewitz - Bad Religion
- Tony Hawk - Pro Skater
- Greg Hetson - Bad Religion, Circle Jerks
- Mark Hoppus - blink-182
- Jim Lindberg - Pennywise
- Mike McDermott - Bouncing Souls
- Tim McIlrath - Rise Against
- Mark Mothersbaugh - Devo
- Duane Peters - U.S. Bombs
- Joe Sib - SideOneDummy Records
- Ron Reyes - Black Flag
- Rick Thorne - BMX Rider
- Kevin Lyman - founder of Warped Tour

== Production ==
The film's first-time director Nevins, initially conceived of the idea for the documentary after reading a book by Jim Lindberg called "Punk Rock Dad", that explored his own feelings of being the raucous punk rocker of his band Pennywise, while at the same time raising kids. Thinking of the punk rock and fatherhood combination as a "fun oxymoron", Nevins originally believed the film would be in the spirit of a comedy, but after realizing how layered and heartfelt the experiences of the men she interviewed really were, the direction of the film changed significantly. The relatively low-cost budget of the film was maintained by the use of its inexpensive camera work and a soundtrack that features most of the artists interviewed throughout the film.

== Box office ==
The Other F Word garnered $53,200 in gross earnings, bringing in $13,286 with its opening weekend premiere in two theaters.

== Critical reception ==
The documentary received generally positive reviews from critics, with Jeanette Catsoulis of The New York Times describing it as "a compelling and often touching peek at punk paternity" and Joe Heim of The Washington Post praising the film's dual nature as "beautifully shot and requisitely gritty."

On the review aggregator website Rotten Tomatoes, 78% of 37 critics' reviews are positive, with an average rating of 6.7/10. The website's consensus reads: "Parenting at its most punk rock, The Other F Word shares enlightening promises for tomorrow from the trailblazers of yesterday."

== Awards ==
The 2011 South by Southwest film festival nominated The Other F Word for its "Films Presented" award.
