= Humble Gods (album) =

Studio album by Humble Gods
- Released: October 17, 1995
- Genre: Punk rock, skate Punk
- Label: Futurist Records

Humble Gods chronology
Humble Gods (1995)	No Heroes (1996)

Humble Gods is the debut studio album of the punk rock band Humble Gods, released on October 17, 1995 on Futurist Records.

== Track listing ==
1. "Glad I'm Not You" - (words and music: Ricky Vodka) - 3:33
2. "Concrete Jungle" - (words and music: Rod Byers) - 3:10 (The Specials cover)
3. "Break It Up" - (words: Brad X / music: Doug Carrion) - 2:07
4. "American Dream" - (words: Brad X, Spike X / music: Doug Carrion) - 2:11
5. "Running Out Of Time" - (words: Brad X / music: Doug Carrion) - 3:05
6. "Animal" - (words and music: Ricky Vodka) - 2:11
7. "Fucked Up" - (words: Brad X / music: Doug Carrion) - 2:03
8. "High Speed" - (words and music: Ricky Vodka) - 2:11
9. "Lil' Red Book" - (words and music by Burt Bacharach and Hal David) - 2:10 (Love cover)
10. "No Use" - (words: Brad X / music: Doug Carrion) - 3:11
11. "Too Much" - (words: Spike X / music: Spike X, Jensen) - 3:32
12. "Grandpa's On Speed" - (words:Spike X, Brad X / music:Spike X) - 1:59
13. "Killer At Large" - (words: Ricky Vodka, Brad X / music: Ricky Vodka) - 3:18
14. "Religion" - (words and music: Spike X) - 1:30

== Personnel ==
- Brad X - vocals
- Ricky Vodka - guitars
- Doug Carrion - guitars
- Spike X - bass
- Blue Lou - drums
