= Yesterdays (Pennywise album) =

Studio album by Pennywise
- Released: July 15, 2014
- Recorded: 1989 (bonus track "Band Practice 89"); 2013–2014 (rest of the album)
- Genre: Punk rock
- Length: 43:03
- Label: Epitaph

Pennywise chronology
| All or Nothing (2012) | Yesterdays (2014) | Never Gonna Die (2018) |

Professional ratings
Aggregate scores
| Source | Rating |
|---|---|
| Metacritic | 65/100 |
Review scores
| Source | Rating |
| AllMusic | 3.5/5 stars |
| Exclaim! | 6/10 |

Yesterdays is the eleventh studio album by the American punk rock band Pennywise, which was released on July 15, 2014. It contains previously unrecorded compositions (with the exception of "No Way Out" and "Slowdown", which appeared on 1989's A Word from the Wise and 1993's Unknown Road respectively) by their late bassist Jason Thirsk. Yesterdays is also Pennywise's first album with singer Jim Lindberg after he left the band in 2009 and returned in 2012. "Violence Never Ending" was released to radio on June 23, 2014.

== Track listing ==
All tracks are written by Pennywise.

| No. | Title | Length |
|---|---|---|
| 1. | "What You Deserve" | 2:47 |
| 2. | "Restless Time" | 1:26 |
| 3. | "Noise Pollution" | 3:18 |
| 4. | "Violence Never Ending" | 1:59 |
| 5. | "Am Oi!" | 2:11 |
| 6. | "Thanksgiving" | 2:52 |
| 7. | "She's a Winner" | 3:22 |
| 8. | "Slowdown" | 3:03 |
| 9. | "Public Defender" | 2:10 |
| 10. | "No Way Out" | 2:44 |
| 11. | "I Can Remember" | 3:44 |
| Total length: | | 29:36 |

Deluxe edition
| No. | Title | Length |
|---|---|---|
| 12. | "Band Practice 89" (Band practice of some of the songs contained on album) | 13:38 |
| Total length: | | 43:14 |

== Personnel ==
=== Pennywise ===
- Jim Lindberg – vocals
- Fletcher Dragge – guitar
- Randy Bradbury – bass
- Byron McMackin – drums

=== Additional ===
- Jason Thirsk – songwriting, bass (Band Practice '89)
- Ian Petersen – producer, engineer
- Gene Grimaldi – mastering
- Fred Hidalgo – logo design, cover art
- Additional art and design provided by Byron McMackin and PENNYWISE

== Charts ==
Chart performance for Yesterdays
| Chart (2014) | Peak position |
|---|---|
| Australian Albums (ARIA) | 16 |
| Belgian Albums (Ultratop Flanders) | 124 |
| German Albums (Offizielle Top 100) | 41 |
| Swiss Albums (Schweizer Hitparade) | 52 |
| US Billboard 200 | 62 |
| US Independent Albums (Billboard) | 9 |
