= Our Impact Will Be Felt =

Compilation album by Various artists
- Released: May 8, 2007
- Recorded: Unknown
- Genre: Hardcore, heavy metal
- Length: 45:06
- Label: Abacus Recordings

Our Impact Will Be Felt is a tribute album by various artists dedicated to Sick of It All, released on May 8, 2007. The album's title is a reference to a line of the song "Built to Last", which appeared on the band's album of the same title.

== Track listing ==
1. Rise Against - "Built to Last"
2. Unearth - "Clobberin Time/What's Going On"
3. Hatebreed - "Rat Pack"
4. Madball - "Give Respect"
5. Bleeding Through - "We Want the Truth"
6. Comeback Kid - "Step Down"
7. Ignite - "Cease Fire"
8. Bouncing Souls - "Good Lookin' Out"
9. Pennywise - "My Life"
10. Kill Your Idols - "Friends Like You"
11. Sepultura - "Scratch The Surface"
12. Himsa - "Maladjusted"
13. Most Precious Blood - "Alone"
14. First Blood - "Just Look Around"
15. Stretch Arm Strong - "Busted"
16. Walls of Jericho - "Us Vs. Them"
17. The Suicide Machines - "Goatless"
18. Bane - "We Stand Alone"
19. No Redeeming Social Value - "World Full Of Hate"
20. Napalm Death - "Who Sets the Rules"
21. Survive - "Blown Away" (Japan bonus track)
22. Loyal To The Grave - "Will We Survive" (Japan bonus track)
