= The Joykiller =

- Origin: Huntington Beach, California, United States
- Genres: Punk rock Alternative rock
- Years active: 1995-2003, 2015
- Label: Epitaph
- Members: Jack Grisham; Ron Emory; Billy Persons; Sean Greaves; Paul Roessler; Chris Lagerborg
- Website: epitaph site

The Joykiller was an American punk rock supergroup from Huntington Beach, California, United States. The Joykiller were formed in 1995 by Jack Grisham of T.S.O.L., Billy Persons (The Weirdos/Gun Club) and Ronnie King. After the formation of the band Jack recruited his ex-T.S.O.L. bandmate Ron Emory on guitar and added Chris Lagerborg on drums. This original line-up recorded one album on Epitaph Records, The Joykiller, before Emory was replaced in 1996.

The next line-up saw the addition of songwriter Sean Greaves on guitar. They recorded two albums on the Epitaph label, Static and Three, and toured the U.S., Canada, and Europe.

The Joykiller released their fifth record, Music for Break-Ups, in January 2015.

== Discography ==
=== Albums ===
- The Joykiller (1995) on Epitaph Records
- Static (1996) on Epitaph Records
- Three (1997) on Epitaph Records
- Ready Sexed Go! (2003) on Epitaph Records
- Music for Break-Ups (2015) Self Released via Kickstarter

== Related bands ==
- Down by Law - Chris Lagerborg
- F-Minus, - Chris Lagerborg
- Floorlords - Sean Greaves
- Gun Club - Billy Persons
- T.S.O.L. - Jack Grisham,Ron Emory
- Tender Fury - Jack Grisham
- The Weirdos - Billy Persons
- 45 Grave - Paul Roessler
