= Never Gonna Die =

Studio album by Pennywise
- Released: April 20, 2018
- Recorded: 2018
- Genres: Punk rock, skate punk, melodic hardcore
- Length: 39:13
- Label: Epitaph

Pennywise chronology
Yesterdays (2014)	Never Gonna Die (2018)

Never Gonna Die is the twelfth studio album by the American punk rock band Pennywise, which was released on April 20, 2018.

== Track listing ==
All tracks are written by Pennywise.

No.	Title	Length
1.	"Never Gonna Die"	2:40
2.	"American Lies"	2:11
3.	"Keep Moving On"	2:30
4.	"Live While You Can"	2:37
5.	"We Set Fire"	3:03
6.	"She Said"	3:40
7.	"Can't Be Ignored"	3:35
8.	"Goodbye Bad Times"	3:07
9.	"A Little Hope"	2:55
10.	"Won't Give Up the Fight"	3:02
11.	"Can't Save You Now"	2:47
12.	"All the Ways U Can Die"	3:08
13.	"Listen"	1:43
14.	"Something New"	2:15
Total length:		39:13

== Personnel ==
Pennywise

- Jim Lindberg – vocals
- Fletcher Dragge – guitar
- Randy Bradbury – bass
- Byron McMackin – drums

Additional personnel

- Sergio Chavez – Engineer
- Michael Cortada – Illustration
- Jason Link – Layout, Design
- Eric Boulanger – Mastered By
- Cameron Webb – Producer, Engineer, Mixed By

== Charts ==
Chart (2018)	Peak position
Australian Albums (ARIA)	18
Austrian Albums (Ö3 Austria)	27
Belgian Albums (Ultratop Flanders)	107
German Albums (Offizielle Top 100)	24
Swiss Albums (Schweizer Hitparade)	23
US Billboard 200	119
US Top Alternative Albums (Billboard)	10
US Top Hard Rock Albums (Billboard)	9
US Independent Albums (Billboard)	8
US Top Rock Albums (Billboard)	25
