= Land of the Free? =

Studio album by Pennywise
- Released: June 19, 2001
- Recorded: February–April 2001
- Studio: Stall #2, Redondo Beach, California
- Genre: Punk rock
- Length: 39:30
- Label: Epitaph
- Producers: Joe Barresi, Pennywise

Pennywise chronology
Live @ the Key Club (2000)	Land of the Free? (2001)	From the Ashes (2003)

Singles from Land of the free?
- 1. "Fuck Authority" Released: 2001; 2. "Divine Intervention" Released: 2001

Land of the Free? is the sixth studio album by American punk rock band Pennywise. Produced by Joe Barresi, the album was released on June 19, 2001. After the commercial success of their previous album, Straight Ahead, Pennywise entered the studio in early 2001 to record a follow-up. Land of the Free? received positive reviews from critics and was well sold worldwide, reaching number 67 on the Billboard Top 200, and number 21 on the Australian ARIA Albums Chart. "Fuck Authority" was released as a single to promote the album.

== Background and production ==
Pennywise released their fifth studio album Straight Ahead in June 1999. Its lead single "Alien" subsequently became a radio hit. In the early stages of writing a follow-up, the material focused on social issues, such as their friends dealing with alcoholism and drug addiction. When the band were aware of the political climate around them – namely, school shootings, police corruption, and elections – they shifted their focus on these issues. Due to each member having their own four-track recorder, they were able to show a song in a more complete state to the rest of the band. The band would then work on the songs together; while producer Joe Barresi wasn't present for the majority of the writing sessions, he showed up on a few occasions to aid in the arrangements of two songs.

Pennywise began recording their next album on February 3, 2001, at Stall #2 in Redondo Beach, California. Barresi and the band co-produced the proceedings, with assistantance from engineer Andrew Busher. Chad Bamford, Billy Bowers, and Darian Rundal later performed digital editing. Working with Barresi, the band wanted to create an album that was "more professional and just big", according to guitarist Fletcher Dragge. He added that Barresi pushed the band to "work harder and took our sound a little farther", however, as the band "don't really listen to anybody," this resulted in some tension between the band and Barresi.

Throughout the sessions, the band released audio interviews with each band member, and posted a potential track list for the album, which consisted of 17 songs. They held a contest where the winners, along with friends of theirs, could sing backing vocals for three of the songs, one of which being "Fuck Authority". On April 6, the band announced that recording was finished, and that they were in the process of mixing. The recordings were mixed at Sol Seven Recording in Sherman Oaks, California, with assistant mix engineer Jeff Thomas. Gene Grimaldi mastered the recordings at Oasis Mastering in Studio City, California.

== Composition ==
Musically, the sound of Land of the Free? has been described as punk rock, drawing comparison to the work of Bad Religion. All of the songs were written by Pennywise, except for "Who's on Your Side", which was written between the band and Epitaph Records founder Brett Gurewitz. Vocalist Jim Lindberg called the album a "soundtrack for political activists all over the world". Dragge's lead parts evoked the sound of Ignite guitarist Joe D. Foster.

The opening track "Time Marches On" starts with the ringing of sirens in the distant and helicopter blades. The title-track "Land of the Free?" harkened back to the band's earlier material, and was the first song written for the album. Discussing the song, Dragge said: "It was land of the free, yeah right, how free are we? How free are we when you can't even vote for a President and have that work out like it should?" The band wrote "Fuck Authority" in protest of government corruption. The verses of "My God" are about people blindly following whatever their religion tells them, while the chorus tackles self-belief and being unable to handle sin. "Divine Intervention" is a mid-tempo song that criticizes organized religion. "WTO" refers to the WTO protests that occurred in Seattle, Washington.

== Release ==
On April 30, 2001, "Time Marches On", alongside an EPK, was made available for download through Pennywise's website. "Fuck Authority" was released to radio stations on May 10. "The World" was posted on the band's website on May 22. In May and June 2001, the band toured Europe as part of the Deconstruction Tour. Land of the Free? was released on June 19, 2001, through Epitaph Records; its cover artwork shows several police officers dressed in riot gear. Following this, the band played the first two and last two weeks of Warped Tour. Partway through this, the music video for "Fuck Authority" was posted online. The track was banned from airplay after the September 11 attacks. In addition to this, the band's midwestern tour was canceled. On November 18, the music video for "My God" was posted on the band's website. The midwest tour was rescheduled for January 2002, with support from BoySetsFire and the Deviates. In March and April, the band toured Australia as part of Warped Tour, before playing a few shows in Japan.

== Reception ==
Professional ratings
Review scores
Source	Rating
AllMusic	4.5/5 stars
Drowned in Sound	9/10
Laut.de	4/5 stars
Metal.de	8/10
Punknews.org	3.5/5 stars
Robert Christgau	(neither)
Rock Hard	9/10

Several critics commented on Lindberg's lyrics. Laut.de writer Stefan Friedrich said that "under the increasingly ignorant politics of George W. Bush, the title 'Land Of The Free?' sums it up perfectly". Drowned in Sound founder Sean Adams said the album's title for "any other band would be a rhetorical question to title a record. The Answer is within the empowering promises and a convey of threats"; he went on to compliment Lindberg's lyricism as the latter "wages war on the heard-it-all before punk of today". Exclaim! writer Rob Ferraz explained that he was not fond of the band previously, but "at least with this record, they use their clout to examine more serious issues than what we've come to expect from them". NME's Louis Pattison felt that if it was a "little more eloquent, it could be a truly inspirational album, a much-needed call to arms for punk's jaded generation", while AllMusic reviewer Jo-Ann Greene thought that Pennywise was not "quite sure what it is they want to say", as the tracks exclaim "concerns and reactions, opinions and questions, ideas and concepts, unleashing their own mixed emotions along the way". Punknews.org staff member Chris Moran was confused about the lyrics, asking "what pissed off Pennywise so much? Sure its a rotten world, but these guys have gone cynical".

Some reviewers praised the songwriting. The staff at Rock Hard wrote that "despite the critical, highly political texts, the 14 songs [...] exude a consistently positive atmosphere that simply puts you in a good mood". They added, "what is particularly striking is Fletcher's guitar work, which not only creates pressure with harmonic riffs, but also conjures up playful leads with lots of atmosphere". Ox-Fanzine reviewer Randy Flame wrote that it would maintain the band's popularity, not solely because of the lyrics, "but also because they have increased their songwriting and sound a lot while staying true to themselves". The staff at Metal.de said the band gave their "fans another high-quality punk album, and that's exactly what one could expect". They added that if the listener was "expect[ing] big differences to the predecessors, you are at the wrong address with this band or even in the wrong genre". Friedrich, meanwhile, wrote that "what sometimes bothered me a little about Pennywise was that a lot of the songs sounded too similar", but despite this, "melodic Cali-Punk on this level hasn't been done that well lately".

Land of the Free? sold 25,000 copies in its first week of release.

== Track listing ==
All songs written by Pennywise, except "Who's on Your Side", written by Pennywise and Brett Gurewitz.

No.	Title	Length
1.	"Time Marches On"	2:57
2.	"Land of the Free?"	2:31
3.	"The World"	2:27
4.	"Fuck Authority"	3:16
5.	"Something Wrong with Me"	2:39
6.	"Enemy"	2:34
7.	"My God"	2:48
8.	"Twist of Fate"	2:33
9.	"Who's on Your Side"	2:50
10.	"It's Up to You"	2:56
11.	"Set Me Free"	2:31
12.	"Divine Intervention"	3:30
13.	"WTO"	2:58
14.	"Anyone Listening"	3:00

== Personnel ==
Personnel per booklet.

Pennywise

- Jim Lindberg – vocals
- Fletcher Dragge – guitar
- Randy Bradbury – bass
- Byron McMackin – drums

Production and design

- Joe Barresi – producer
- Pennywise – producer
- Andrew Busher – assistant engineer
- Chad Bamford – digital editing
- Billy Bowers – digital editing
- Darian Rundal – digital editing
- Jeff Thomas – assistant mix engineer
- Gene Grimaldi – mastering
- Tom D Kline – art direction, graphic design
- Kevin Williams – band photos
- Ted Grudowski – WTO photos

== Charts ==
Chart performance for Land of the Free?
Chart (2001)	Peak position
Australian Albums (ARIA)	21
New Zealand Albums (RMNZ)	32
Swiss Albums (Schweizer Hitparade)	89
US Billboard 200	67
