= Unknown Road =

Studio album by Pennywise
- Released: August 17, 1993
- Recorded: 1993
- Studios: Westbeach Recorders, Hollywood, California
- Genres: Punk rock; hardcore punk; skate punk
- Length: 33:33
- Label: Epitaph
- Producer: Joe Peccerillo

Pennywise chronology
A Word from the Wise/Wildcard (1992)	Unknown Road (1993)	About Time (1995)

Singles from Unknown Road
- 1. "Homesick" Released: 1993; 2. "Dying To Know" Released: 1994

Unknown Road is the second studio album by American punk rock band Pennywise, released on August 17, 1993, through Epitaph Records. After frontman Jim Lindberg briefly left the band during touring in support of its previous album, Pennywise (1991), Pennywise began the recording sessions for their second album. Released a year before the success of punk rock in California, Unknown Road gained Pennywise supporting slots on national and world tours with bands such as the Offspring (who was just about to hit the mainstream with then-new album Smash). Some archived footage of the Unknown Road tour dates can be seen on the band's 1995 documentary Home Movies.

== Background and recording ==
In 1989, Pennywise released the vinyl only EPs A Word from the Wise and Wildcard (which were both re-released on CD in 1992). Thanks to the success of the EPs, Epitaph Records (a label owned by Bad Religion guitarist Brett Gurewitz) saw the band's potential and signed them in 1990. In the following year, Pennywise managed to release their first album for the label, which is self-titled. The album quickly spread throughout the punk community, earning the band some nationwide recognition. Lyrics in the album endorsed a positive mental attitude, helping promote progressive ideals for Generation X. Lindberg left the band soon after the debut record. Bass player Randy Bradbury joined the lineup as Thirsk took over lead vocal duties. In 1992, The Vandals lead singer Dave Quackenbush took over on vocals for a brief stint. Bradbury left the band and Thirsk returned to bass (Bradbury would rejoin Pennywise permanently after Thirsk's death in 1996, which retroactively made this the first album recorded with the band's present lineup). During the 1991-1992 tour, Pennywise began writing their second album, entitled Unknown Road. After Lindberg returned to the fold in 1992, they managed to begin recording their new album at Westbeach Recorders in Hollywood, California with producer Joe Peccerillo.

== Reception ==
Professional ratings
Review scores
Source	Rating
AllMusic	4/5 stars
Punknews.org	4.5/5 stars
Spin	(favorable)

The AllMusic review by Paul Henderson stated: "Unknown Road is an inspired effort by the reunited and recharged Pennywise, the first consistently solid release of their career."

== Track listing ==
All songs by Pennywise.

No.	Title	Length
1.	"Unknown Road"	2:46
2.	"Homesick"	2:17
3.	"Time to Burn"	2:19
4.	"It's Up to Me"	3:16
5.	"You Can Demand"	2:17
6.	"Nothing"	2:33
7.	"Vices"	2:03
8.	"City Is Burning"	2:12
9.	"Dying to Know"	3:04
10.	"Tester"	3:14
11.	"Try to Conform"	2:40
12.	"Give and Get"	2:01
13.	"Clear Your Head"	2:51

The track "Slowdown" is after "Clear Your Head" (track 13) on the original album pressing. It is its own track on the 2005 remastered edition.

The piano on the track "Unknown Road" is extended after the silence on the closing track, "Bro Hymn Tribute", of the album Full Circle. This piano piece is taken from the 1992 movie Poison Ivy.

The tracks "Homesick", “Try to Conform”, and "Dying to Know" were featured in the 1997 arcade game Top Skater.

== Personnel ==
- Jim Lindberg – vocals
- Fletcher Dragge – guitar
- Randy Bradbury – bass
- Jason Thirsk – bass on "It's Up to Me" and "Tester"
- Byron McMackin – drums
- Fred Hidalgo – album art
