= The Fuse (album) =

Studio album by Pennywise
- Released: August 9, 2005
- Recorded: October 2004–April 2005
- Studio: Stall #2, Redondo Beach, California
- Genres: Punk rock, skate punk, melodic hardcore
- Length: 42:49
- Label: Epitaph
- Producers: Pennywise, Darian Rundall

Pennywise chronology
From the Ashes (2003)	The Fuse (2005)	Reason to Believe (2008)

Singles from The Fuse
- 1. "Disconnect" Released: 2005; 2. "Knocked Down" Released: 2005

The Fuse is the eighth studio album by American punk rock band Pennywise. It was released on August 9, 2005.

The Fuse charted at number 36 in Australia on the ARIA Albums Chart, their third lowest position on the chart among the band's album releases. It peaked at #78 on the Billboard 200.

== Background ==
Pennywise spent the first few months of 2005 writing and rehearsing new material for their next album, making over 30 demos in the process, which they planned to shortlist to 16–18. In April 2005, they began recording the new album, which was tentatively titled The Fuse.

== Release ==
On June 15, 2005, The Fuse was announced for released in two months' time; alongside this, the artwork and track listing was posted online. Pennywise toured Europe with Stretch Arm Strong in June and July 2005, and included appearanves at the Greenfield, Feria and Fury festivals. On July 5, 2005, "Knocked Down" was posted online; followed by "Disconnect" near the end of the month. The Fuse was released on August 9, 2005, through Epitaph Records. In September 2005, they toured the East Coast with H_{2}O, Death by Stereo and A Wilhelm Scream. For the next two months, they went on a North American trek with Bad Religion, and supported Sick of It All for a handful of East Coast shows. Pennywise opened 2006 with a month-long US West Coast tour, with support from No Use for a Name, the Suicide Machines, and Love Equals Death. An Australian tour was intended to follow, but the band cancelled citing "unforeseen circumstances". On April 26, 2006, a music vieo was released for "Knocked Down". In July 2006, they embarked on an Australian tour with support from Goons of Doom. They then went on a Canadian tour with Circle Jerks, Ignite, and Brown Brigade, before playing a few East Coast US shows.

== Critical reception ==
Professional ratings
Review scores
Source	Rating
AllMusic	4.5/5 stars
Drowned in Sound	6/10
The Encyclopedia of Popular Music	3/5 stars
IGN	6.4/10

Drowned in Sound wrote that the songs are "all fantastically brilliant tunes for sure, they all have the ability to entwine themselves into a teenage summer and they're all hugely sing-along-able."

== Track listing ==
No.	Title	Length
1.	"Knocked Down"	2:44
2.	"Yell Out"	2:34
3.	"Competition Song"	2:41
4.	"Take a Look Around"	2:14
5.	"Closer"	3:15
6.	"6th Avenue Nightmare"	2:39
7.	"The Kids"	3:22
8.	"Fox TV"	2:36
9.	"Stand Up"	3:17
10.	"Dying"	2:18
11.	"Disconnect"	2:57
12.	"Premeditated Murder"	2:40
13.	"Best I Can"	2:43
14.	"18 Soldiers"	2:39
15.	"Lies"	4:02
Total length:		42:49

Japanese CD release bonus track
No.	Title	Length
16.	"Million Miles"	3:03

== Personnel ==
- Jim Lindberg – vocals
- Fletcher Dragge – guitar
- Randy Bradbury – bass
- Byron McMackin – drums

== Charts ==
Chart performance for The Fuse
Chart (2005)	Peak position
Australian Albums (ARIA)	36
German Albums (Offizielle Top 100)	100
Swiss Albums (Schweizer Hitparade)	60
US Billboard 200	78
US Independent Albums (Billboard)	9
