= Live @ the Key Club =

Live @ The Key Club

Live album by Pennywise
- Released: October 24, 2000
- Recorded: May 11, 2000 at The Key Club, West Hollywood, California
- Genres: Punk rock; melodic hardcore; hardcore punk
- Length: 51:41
- Label: Epitaph

Pennywise chronology
Straight Ahead (1999)	Live @ The Key Club (2000)	Land of the Free? (2001)

Professional ratings
Review scores
Source	Rating
AllMusic	2.5/5 stars
Drowned in Sound	4/10

Live @ The Key Club is a live album by California punk rock band Pennywise, released in 2000. It was recorded at The Key Club, on May 11, 2000.

== Track listing ==
All tracks are written by Pennywise, except where noted.

No.	Title	Length
1.	"Intro"	0:47
2.	"Wouldn't It Be Nice"	2:34
3.	"Living for Today"	3:10
4.	"Final Chapters"	2:30
5.	"Can't Believe It"	2:04
6.	"Unknown Road"	2:12
7.	"Homesick"	2:21
8.	"No Reason Why"	2:51
9.	"Fight Till You Die"	2:58
10.	"Peaceful Day"	2:51
11.	"Society"	3:31
12.	"Straight Ahead"	3:09
13.	"Pennywise"	1:59
14.	"Perfect People"	2:58
15.	"Minor Threat" (Minor Threat cover)	2:15
16.	"Same Old Story"	3:11
17.	"Alien"	4:37
18.	"Bro Hymn"	5:43
Total length:		51:41
