= Straight Ahead (Pennywise album) =

Studio album by Pennywise
- Released: June 1, 1999
- Recorded: 1998–1999
- Studios: Stall #2; Redondo Beach, California
- Genres: Melodic hardcore; skate punk; punk rock
- Length: 48:20
- Label: Epitaph
- Producers: Darian Rundall, Pennywise

Pennywise chronology
Full Circle (1997)	Straight Ahead (1999)	Live @ the Key Club (2000)

Singles from Straight Ahead
- 1. "Straight Ahead" Released: 1999; 2. "Alien" Released: July 31st, 1999; 3. "Victim of Reality" Released: 2000

Straight Ahead is the fifth studio album by the American punk rock band Pennywise, released in 1999 via Epitaph Records. It contains the single "Alien."

== Release ==
Straight Ahead was released in June 1999. In October 2000, the band played at Cypress Hill's Smoke Out Festival. The band toured Australia in November 2000; the dates were rescheduled from July 2000 as Lindberg's mother was suffering from cancer. They were supported by Frenzal Rhomb and Game Over.

== Critical reception ==
Professional ratings
Review scores
Source	Rating
AllMusic	3.5/5 stars
The Encyclopedia of Popular Music	3/5 stars
Pitchfork	9.3/10

Ox-Fanzine called the album "fast, direct, accomplished and powerful." CMJ New Music Report wrote that "the inescapable anger highlights, rather than buries, the metallic power riffs and inspired drumming." Phoenix New Times wrote that Straight Ahead is "rooted in West Coast surfer-skater party-punk, with rough-and-tumble melodies on top of briny torrents of guitars."

== Track listing ==
All tracks are written by Pennywise.

No.	Title	Length
1.	"Greed"	3:15
2.	"My Own Country"	2:36
3.	"Can't Believe It"	1:57
4.	"Victim of Reality"	2:28
5.	"Might Be a Dream"	2:43
6.	"Still Can Be Great"	2:52
7.	"Straight Ahead"	2:41
8.	"My Own Way"	2:52
9.	"One Voice"	2:46
10.	"Alien"	4:07
11.	"Watch Me as I Fall"	2:10
12.	"Just for You"	2:28
13.	"Can't Take Anymore"	3:15
14.	"American Dream"	2:57
15.	"Need More"	2:56
16.	"Never Know"	2:42
17.	"Badge of Pride"	3:35
Total length:		48:20

== Personnel ==
Pennywise

- Jim Lindberg – vocals
- Fletcher Dragge – guitar
- Randy Bradbury – bass
- Byron McMackin – drums

Production

- Darian Rundall – producer, engineer
- Eddie Schreyer – mastering
- Jesse Fischer – art direction, layout
- Dave Leamon – cover illustrator

== Charts ==
Chart performance for Straight Ahead
Chart (1999)	Peak position
Australian Albums (ARIA)	8
Canadian Albums (Billboard)	17
German Albums (Offizielle Top 100)	93
New Zealand Albums (RMNZ)	12
US Billboard 200	62

== Certifications ==
Region	Certification	Certified units/sales
Australia (ARIA)	Gold	35,000^{^}
^{^} Shipments figures based on certification alone.
