= Full Circle (Pennywise album) =

Album by Pennywise

Studio album by Pennywise
- Released: April 22, 1997
- Recorded: 1996
- Studios: Total Access, Redondo Beach, California
- Genres: Punk rock; skate punk; melodic hardcore
- Length: 60:35
- Label: Epitaph
- Producers: Pennywise, Eddie Ashworth

Pennywise chronology
About Time (1995)	Full Circle (1997)	Straight Ahead (1999)

Singles from Full Circle
- 1. "Society" Released: 1997; 2. "What if I" Released: 1997

Full Circle is the fourth studio album by the American punk rock band Pennywise. It was released on April 22, 1997, and was digitally remastered on March 8, 2005 on the original label. This is the first Pennywise studio album to feature Randy Bradbury, who replaced bassist Jason Thirsk, who had died from suicide on July 29, 1996. The entire album was dedicated to the memory of Thirsk, who had been a key songwriter for Pennywise until his death, and a close friend of all of those in the band.

== Writing and production ==
There had been a delay between 1995's About Time and the recording of this album, which occurred in the fall of 1996. During the About Time tour, founding member Jason Thirsk took a hiatus from Pennywise to try to control his then-growing alcoholism. One Hit Wonder bassist Randy Bradbury, who had contributed on the band's 1993 album Unknown Road, stepped in. When Thirsk returned briefly on bass in 1996, Bradbury was supposed to switch to rhythm guitar; unfortunately, Thirsk died of a self-inflicted gunshot wound on July 29 of that year at the age of 28. His death nearly delayed the production of the fourth Pennywise album.

Pennywise was shaken by Thirsk's death; however, they decided to continue performing, thus adding Bradbury as Thirsk's permanent replacement. The band finally returned to the studio in the fall of 1996 to begin recording the follow-up to About Time.

== Reception ==
Professional ratings
Review scores
Source	Rating
AllMusic	4.5/5 stars
Pitchfork	8.0/10
Rolling Stone	3/5 stars

NME listed the album as one of "20 Pop Punk Albums Which Will Make You Nostalgic".

== Track listing ==
No.	Title	Length
1.	"Fight Till You Die"	2:22
2.	"Date with Destiny"	2:55
3.	"Get a Life"	2:56
4.	"Society"	3:24
5.	"Final Day"	3:11
6.	"Broken"	2:46
7.	"Running Out of Time"	2:21
8.	"You'll Never Make It"	2:35
9.	"Every Time"	3:37
10.	"Nowhere Fast"	2:56
11.	"What If I"	2:55
12.	"Go Away"	1:51
13.	"Did You Really?"	2:51
14.	"Bro Hymn Tribute" (ends at 5:10; hidden track begins at 10:08)	23:55

- After a period of silence, a hidden track with a piano solo is played. The solo is an extension of the original piano composition that marks the beginning of Pennywise's second album Unknown Road (1993). Track 14, including the period of silence and the hidden track, totals 23:55.

All songs by Pennywise.

== Personnel ==
- Jim Lindberg : vocals
- Fletcher Dragge : guitar
- Randy Bradbury : bass
- Byron McMackin : drums
- Eddie Ashworth : producer, engineer, mixing
- Milton Chan : mixing
- Fred Hidalgo : logo
- Jesse Fischer : artwork
- Brett Gurewitz : mixing
- Pennywise : producer, engineer, artwork, mixing
- Darian Rundall : assistant engineer, mixing
- Eddy Schreyer : mastering
- Justin Thirsk : bridge vocals and outro drumming on "Bro Hymn"
- Ronnie King : piano on "Unknown Road"

== Charts ==
Chart performance for Full Circle
Chart (1997)	Peak position
Australian Albums (ARIA)	13
Dutch Albums (Album Top 100)	93
Finnish Albums (Suomen virallinen lista)	38
New Zealand Albums (RMNZ)	36
US Billboard 200	79

== Certifications ==
Region	Certification	Certified units/sales
Australia (ARIA)	Gold	35,000^{^}
^{^} Shipments figures based on certification alone.
