= About Time (Pennywise album) =

Studio album by Pennywise
- Released: June 13, 1995
- Recorded: December 1994–March 1995
- Studio: Total Access (Redondo Beach, California)
- Genres: Punk rock; skate punk; hardcore punk
- Length: 32:07
- Label: Epitaph
- Producers: Jerry Finn, Brett Gurewitz

Pennywise chronology
Unknown Road (1993)	About Time (1995)	Full Circle (1997)

Singles from About Time
- 1. "Same Old Story" Released: 1995; 2. "Searching" Released: 1996

About Time is the third studio album by American punk rock band Pennywise, released on June 13, 1995.

It is widely considered to be one of Pennywise's best releases, and it includes their concert staples "Peaceful Day", "Perfect People", "Every Single Day", and "Same Old Story". About Time was also the first Pennywise album to chart in Billboard; the release peaked at number 96. Most of the album follows the theme of problems with time: fear of it passing, controlling it and accepting it.

About Time is the final Pennywise album to feature bass player Jason Thirsk, who committed suicide on July 29, 1996. After debating whether to break up, or to move on with a new bass player, Pennywise decided to hire a new bassist, Randy Bradbury, who would stay with the band permanently.

== Background and recording ==
Frontman Jim Lindberg rejoined Pennywise in 1992, after a temporary hiatus, releasing the second album Unknown Road in 1993. Although Unknown Road failed to chart in Billboard, the band enjoyed moderate success and gained supporting slots on national and world tours with bands such as the Offspring. Due to constant touring and appearances on snowboarding and surfing videos, the album sold around 200,000 copies. In the latter part of 1994, Pennywise began writing and recording their third album, entitled About Time. They entered Total Access Recording in Redondo Beach that December and recorded their new album over a three-month period. When they were in the midst of recording About Time, Pennywise was courted by several major labels, who approached the band following the unexpected multi-platinum breakthrough success of Green Day and The Offspring, but Pennywise rejected the idea of signing to a major label and decided to stay with Epitaph.

About Time was the final Pennywise studio album to feature bassist Jason Thirsk; however, it was not their last album to contain songs written by him. Thirsk was still alive when writing for Full Circle began, and co-wrote some previously unreleased songs that would eventually appear on the band's 2014 album Yesterdays.

== Reception ==
Professional ratings
Review scores
Source	Rating
AllMusic	4.5/5 stars
Melody Maker	(favorable)
Robert Christgau	(neither)
Punknews.org	4.5/5 stars
The San Diego Union-Tribune	3/4 stars

The AllMusic review by Paul Henderson stated: "The band's fourth release in as many years finds it functioning as a full-strength unit, cranking out searing hardcore laced with positive but leery messages and ideals. While the music and message remain essentially the same as their previous releases, increasing depth and maturity begin to take hold in both these areas."

== Track listing ==
No.	Title	Length
1.	"Peaceful Day"	2:52
2.	"Waste of Time"	2:18
3.	"Perfect People"	3:04
4.	"Every Single Day"	2:39
5.	"Searching"	2:55
6.	"Not Far Away"	2:52
7.	"Freebase"	2:41
8.	"It's What You Do with It"	2:25
9.	"Try"	2:32
10.	"Same Old Story"	2:42
11.	"I Won't Have It"	2:30
12.	"Killing Time"	2:37

== Personnel ==
- Jim Lindberg – vocals
- Fletcher Dragge – guitar
- Jason Thirsk – bass
- Byron McMackin – drums
- Eddie Ashworth – assistant engineer
- Jerry Finn – producer, engineer
- Brett Gurewitz – producer
- Fred Hidalgo – album art

== Charts ==
Chart performance for About Time
Chart (1995)	Peak position
Australian Albums (ARIA)	55
Dutch Albums (Album Top 100)	84
Finnish Albums (Suomen virallinen lista)	24
German Albums (Offizielle Top 100)	76
Swedish Albums (Sverigetopplistan)	28
US Billboard 200	96

== Certifications ==
Region	Certification	Certified units/sales
Australia (ARIA)	Gold	35,000^{^}
^{^} Shipments figures based on certification alone.
