= Pennywise (album) =

Studio album by Pennywise
- Released: 1991
- Recorded: 1991
- Studios: Westbeach Recorders, Hollywood, California
- Genres: Punk rock, skate punk
- Length: 31:32
- Label: Epitaph
- Producer: Pennywise

Pennywise chronology
Wildcard (1989)	Pennywise (1991)	A Word from the Wise/Wildcard (1992)

Pennywise is the debut studio album by the American punk rock band Pennywise, released on Epitaph Records in 1991.

== Writing and production ==
Writing for the first Pennywise album began around 1989/1990. The band recorded it in 1991 at Westbeach Recorders in Hollywood, California. Epitaph owner/founder Brett Gurewitz actually produced the album. However, constant disagreements with guitarist Fletcher over the album's production and his dislike of the sound of the album prompted him to have his name taken off the credits in the liner notes.

== Reception ==
Professional ratings
Review scores
Source	Rating
AllMusic	4.5/5 stars
Flipside	(mixed)
Maximum Rocknroll	(mixed)

Trouser Press wrote: "As a skatepunk answer to Bad Religion, Pennywise's eponymous debut weds driving, warp-speed punk-rock to intelligent, positive-thinking lyrics. The clean production, tight vocal harmonies and crisp ensemble playing provide a fine showcase for the Hermosa Beach, California band's high-energy odes to self-reliance and camaraderie."

== Track listing ==
All tracks are written by Pennywise.

No.	Title	Length
1.	"Wouldn't It Be Nice"	2:06
2.	"Rules"	1:25
3.	"The Secret"	3:33
4.	"Living for Today"	3:07
5.	"Come Out Fighting"	2:16
6.	"Homeless"	2:09
7.	"Open Door"	1:40
8.	"Pennywise"	1:37
9.	"Who's to Blame"	1:35
10.	"Fun and Games"	2:32
11.	"Kodiak"	1:46
12.	"Side One"	2:10
13.	"No Reason Why"	2:36
14.	"Bro Hymn"	3:00
Total length:		31:22

Bonus track (2005 remastered edition)
No.	Title	Length
15.	"Psycho 89"	1:53

== Personnel ==
Pennywise

- Fletcher Dragge – guitar
- Jim Lindberg – vocals
- Byron McMackin – drums
- Jason Thirsk – bass

Artwork

- Fred Hidalgo – logo design, cover art
- Gavin Oglesby – artwork, art direction
