= Jim Lindberg =

American singer

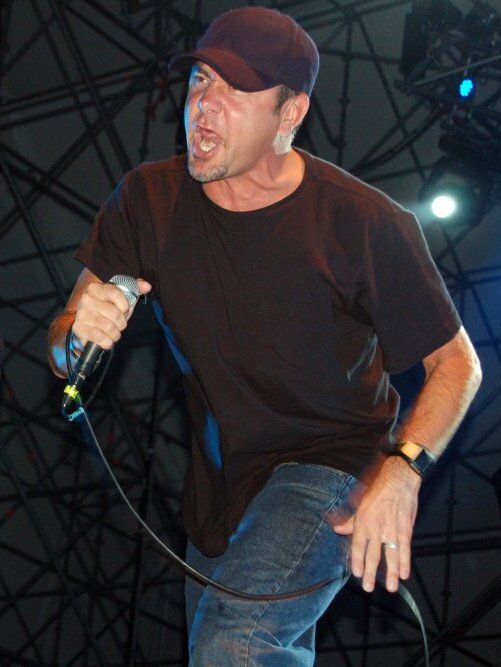
- Lindberg on stage with Pennywise in 2006.

Background information
- Born: James William Lindberg; July 26, 1965 (age 61)
- Origin: Hermosa Beach, California, U.S.
- Genres: Punk rock, melodic hardcore, skate punk, hardcore punk
- Occupations: Musician, songwriter
- Instruments: Vocals, guitar
- Years active: 1980s–present

James William Lindberg (born July 26, 1965) is an American singer and guitarist. Active since the 1980s, when he played in local bands in his early career, he is best known as the songwriter and lead singer of the punk rock band Pennywise, which he fronted from 1988 to 2009, and has again since 2012. He also founded The Black Pacific, who released a debut album in 2010.

Lindberg became Pennywise's main lyricist after the death of bassist Jason Thirsk, who was responsible for encouraging the band's message of positive mental attitude and self-reliance. A UCLA English major graduate, Lindberg often cited American transcendentalist philosophers Ralph Waldo Emerson and Henry David Thoreau as major influences on his lyrics. With titles such as "My Own Way", "It's Up to You", "Date With Destiny", and "My Own Country", Lindberg's lyrics often reflected the transcendentalist credo to live life by one's own rules and not adhere to the materialistic constraints of society or authority.

== Biography ==
=== Pennywise ===
After years playing in local bands, Lindberg joined Pennywise in 1988 with Fletcher Dragge on guitar, Jason Thirsk on bass and Byron McMackin on drums. Some of the members were previously alums from two South Bay High Schools, Redondo Union High School and Mira Costa (where Lindberg graduated in 1983). In 1989, the band released two EPs, A Word from the Wise and Wildcard, that attracted the attention of Epitaph Records, who signed the band a year later. Lindberg left the band briefly after the release of their first album, Pennywise, citing the escalating violence of the L.A. punk scene and was married. Randy Bradbury filled in on bass while Thirsk moved over to vocals. Lindberg returned however to record their sophomore release, Unknown Road, after the band's music was featured in a number of surfing and skateboarding videos attracting a less violent following. After they released their third studio release, About Time, Thirsk left the band in late 1995, and was again replaced by Bradbury. They had moderate chart success, with the latter album reaching the Billboard top 100. It was hoped that Thirsk would return on bass, with Bradbury switching to rhythm guitar; unfortunately, Thirsk died of a self-inflicted gunshot wound on July 29 of that year at the age of 28. Although Pennywise considered disbanding after Thirsk's death, the band decided to continue on with Bradbury as his permanent replacement. Since then, Pennywise continued to record and perform, releasing six more studio albums and a live recording.

Along with contemporaries and fellow Epitaph Records labelmates Bad Religion, NOFX, Rancid and The Offspring, Pennywise were one of the five main stage headliners that helped establish The Vans Warped tour as one of America's longest running traveling music festivals.

In August 2009, Lindberg announced that he was leaving Pennywise. He released the following statement:

After 20 years, nine albums and thousands of shows around the world, my time in Pennywise has come to an end. Being the singer for this band has been an amazing experience, and along the way we made some of the best fans anyone could ask for. There are few things that made me more proud than seeing people at our shows singing our songs, and it’s your support and encouragement that’s kept me going this long. I would sincerely like to thank everyone who helped us along the way and wish everyone in the Pennywise family the best of luck and continued success. Yours truly, Jim.

It was later revealed that Lindberg left Pennywise due to creative differences and the fact that he did not want to tour as much as his bandmates aspired to.

In October 2012 Pennywise announced that Lindberg would return to the band after his replacement Zoltán Téglás was sidelined by back problems.

=== The Black Pacific ===
In June 2010 Lindberg unveiled his new band The Black Pacific. The group signed to SideOneDummy Records and debuted two tracks, "The System" and "When It's Over". Black Pacific features Alan Vega (from Good Guys in Black) on drums and Davey Latter (from Everest) on bass, with Jim writing all of the songs, playing guitar, and singing. Produced by Far guitarist Shaun Lopez, Black Pacific's debut album features a variety of musical styles. Black Pacific played their debut show at Epicenter 2010 in Fontana, California. Their self-titled debut was released on September 14, 2010.

The Black Pacific toured in support of the album performing with Sum 41, The Riverboat Gamblers and Veara on the Eastpak Antidote tour in October 2010, and playing Groezrock festival, Pukkelpop and various other European festivals in 2011, in addition to select dates on the Vans Warped tour and opening for Rise Against and Flogging Molly for a fall tour of Canada.

On September 20, 2024, The Black Pacific released its second record, "Here Comes Our Wave" through Toronto-based label Dine Alone Records.

=== Songs from the Elkhorn Trail ===
Lindberg released a solo acoustic album Songs from the Elkhorn Trail in November 2021. Produced by Ted Hutt, the album includes introspective songs about friends and relationships and features Lindberg on guitar and vocals, along with Marc Orrell, Joe Gittleman, David Hidalgo Jr, Connor Vance, and Glen Marhevka on accompanying instruments.

=== Other projects ===
A lifelong surfer, Jim has been an active supporter of the Surfrider foundation and appeared in public service announcements for various ocean related causes. He helped organize Pennywise's involvement in the Surfrider benefit compilation album, M.O.M. (Music for Our Mother ocean), where the band recorded cover versions of popular Beach Boys songs, and also participated in various celebrity charity surf events.

Lindberg has also been active with various charity causes, including spearheading the effort to donate all proceeds of a 2000 Pennywise concert at The Los Angeles Sports Arena to charity. In 2008, Jim organized the donation of proceeds of Pennywise's "Reason to Believe" record release party to benefit the UCLA Duchenne Muscular Dystrophy Center on behalf of Cooper's Cure, an organization that helps fund awareness and research into Duchenne muscular dystrophy. While on tour with The Black Pacific in Europe, Jim recorded a cover of the song "Knowledge" by Operation Ivy, with Mike Wiebe from Riverboat Gamblers and Radio Havana to benefit skate-aid, a charitable foundation that benefits children of the world through skateboarding related projects. In February 2011, Jim also took part in the "Rock Vs. Cancer" show to benefit the Lymphoma Society at the House of Blues in San Diego.

Lindberg provided backing vocals on the Bad Religion track "Marked" from their 1994 album Stranger than Fiction. He also provided backing vocals for two of The Offspring's albums Americana and Splinter. In October 2009, Lindberg appeared on Flip Skateboards Extremely Sorry Soundtrack on a wholly electronic track written and produced by UK-born, Los Angeles-based DJ and producer Baron.

Lindberg has also been affiliated with cable television VOD content provider Havoc TV.

=== Punk Rock Dad ===
Lindberg also released his first book in May 2007, Punk Rock Dad. The book explores the dichotomy of being a responsible husband and parent raising 3 daughters while fronting an anti-establishment punk rock band and includes a number of anecdotes relating to each role. The book featured comments from members of The Offspring, NOFX and Lagwagon and back page credits from members of Pearl Jam, Foo Fighters, Everclear and Dr. Drew Pinsky.

"Punk Rock Dad" was the inspiration for the 2010 documentary The Other F Word which was an official selection of the South By Southwest film festival. Produced by Cristan Reilly and directed by Andrea Nevins, the film followed Lindberg at home and on tour with Pennywise, and featured interviews with various other dads from the music and actions sports world including Flea from Red Hot Chili Peppers, Fat Mike from NOFX, Mark Hoppus from Blink 182, Tim McIlrath of Rise Against, Ron Reyes of Black Flag, Art Alexakis of Everclear and skateboarding legend Tony Hawk among others. The film was picked up for distribution by Beastie Boy Adam Yauch's film company, Oscilloscope Laboratories.

== Personal life ==
Lindberg now lives in the south bay of Los Angeles with his wife and three daughters. He attended El Camino College, San Diego State University and later went on to graduate from UCLA in 1989.

== Discography ==
=== Pennywise ===
- Pennywise (1991)
- Unknown Road (1993)
- About Time (1995)
- Full Circle (1997)
- Straight Ahead (1999)
- Land of the Free? (2001)
- From the Ashes (2003)
- The Fuse (2005)
- Reason to Believe (2008)
- Yesterdays (2014)
- Never Gonna Die (2018)

=== The Black Pacific ===
- The Black Pacific (2010)
- Here Comes Our Wave (2024)

=== Solo ===
- Songs from the Elkhorn Trail (2021)
