= Pennywise (band) =

American punk rock band

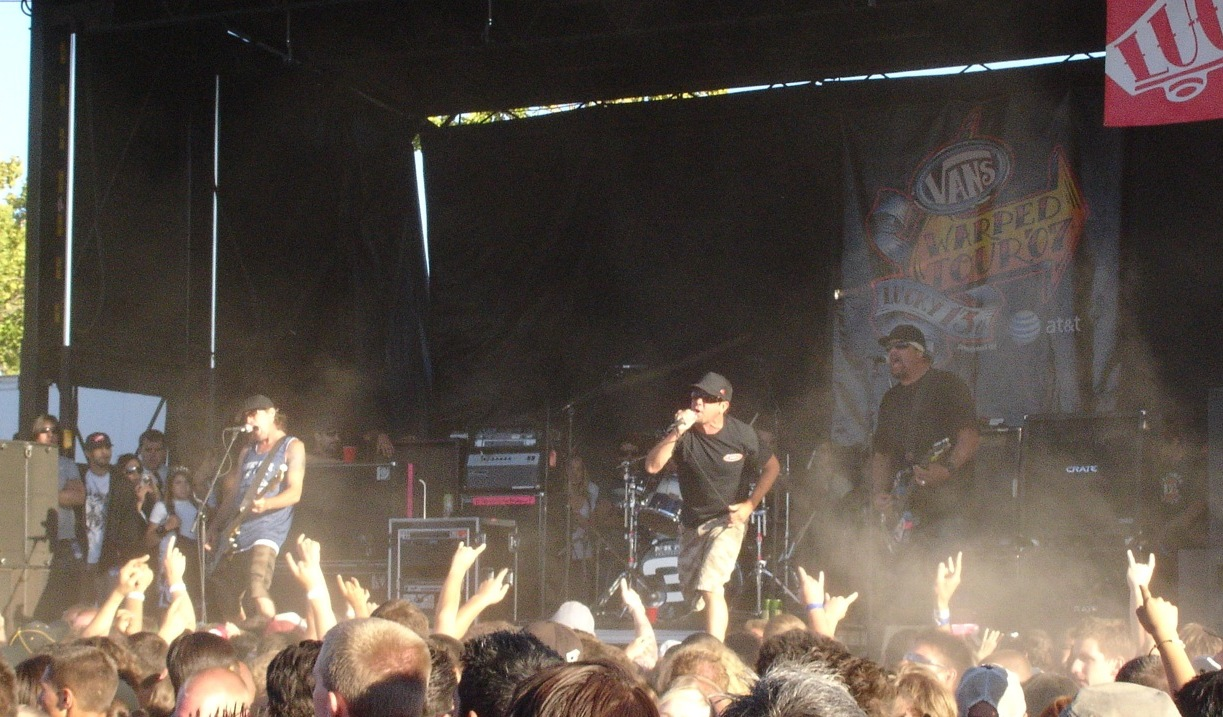
- Pennywise at Warped Tour 2007

Background information
- Origin: Hermosa Beach, California, U.S.
- Genres: Punk rock; skate punk; melodic hardcore
- Works: Discography
- Years active: 1988–present
- Labels: Theologian; Epitaph; MySpace
- Members: Fletcher Dragge; Byron McMackin; Jim Lindberg; Randy Bradbury
- Past members: Jason Thirsk; Keith Brown; Hank Jacobson; Dave Quackenbush; Zoli Téglás
- Website: pennywisdom.com

Pennywise is an American punk rock band from Hermosa Beach, California, formed in 1988. The band took its name from the antagonist in Stephen King's horror novel It known as Pennywise.

Between their 1991 self-titled debut and 2005's The Fuse, Pennywise released an album every two years on Epitaph Records, a label owned by Bad Religion guitarist Brett Gurewitz. To date, the band has released twelve full-length studio albums, one live album, two EPs and one DVD. Although their first two studio albums were critically acclaimed, Pennywise would not experience worldwide commercial success until the 1995 release of their third studio album, About Time, which peaked at number ninety-six on the Billboard 200, and number fifty-five on Australia's ARIA Charts. The band's mainstream success coincided with a growing interest in punk rock during the 1990s, along with fellow California bands NOFX, Rancid, Blink-182, Bad Religion, Green Day, The Offspring, Lagwagon, and Sublime. By 2007, the band had independently sold over three million records worldwide.

Pennywise's current line-up consists of Jim Lindberg (vocals), Fletcher Dragge (guitars), Randy Bradbury (bass), and Byron McMackin (drums). In August 2009, Lindberg decided to leave the band; he was replaced in February 2010 by Ignite singer Zoli Téglás. With Téglás, the band recorded their tenth studio album, All or Nothing, which was released on May 1, 2012. Lindberg rejoined the band later that year after Téglás was sidelined by a back injury.

The staff of Consequence ranked the band at number 31 on their list of "The 100 Best Pop Punk Bands" in 2019.

== Band history ==
=== Early years (1988–1992) ===
Pennywise was formed in 1988 in Hermosa Beach, California by guitarist Fletcher Dragge, bassist Jason Thirsk, singer/guitarist Keith Brown and drummer Hank Jacobson. Brown and Jacobson would leave later that same year, with drummer Byron McMackin joining and Thirsk covering vocals until singer Jim Lindberg joined. They originally performed as "P.M.A.", which stood for "Positive Mental Attitude". They released two EPs A Word from the Wise and Wildcard (both 1989). Each of the band members had played in other bands in the Hermosa Beach area and attended Mira Costa High School, except for McMackin, who attended Redondo Union High School.

The group signed to Epitaph Records in 1990 and released their first album, Pennywise (1991). The album quickly circulated throughout the punk community, earning the band some nationwide recognition. Lyrics in the album endorsed a positive mental attitude, helping promote progressive ideals for Generation X. Lindberg left the band six months after the release of the debut record, citing a lack of motivation and security by rock groups in the area. The group toured Europe with Dave Quackenbush of The Vandals on vocals, before Thirsk moved from bass to vocals, with Randy Bradbury taking over bass. Lindberg rejoined the group in late 1992, Bradbury left, and Thirsk returned to bass.

=== Increasing popularity and Thirsk's death (1993–1996) ===
Lindberg got married and returned to the group in 1992 in time for their second album, Unknown Road, released in August 1993, an underground hit that established the band as a force in punk music. While the album did not chart on the Billboard 200, it gained Pennywise supporting slots on national and world tours with bands such as The Offspring. It contained 13 tracks and one hidden track, "Slowdown".

About Time, Pennywise's third studio album, was released on June 13, 1995. It was their first album to chart on the Billboard 200, ranking 96. It also charted 55 on the Australian Album Chart, and produced two singles, "Same Old Story" and "Searching". This was also the last album to feature Jason Thirsk playing bass throughout.

In 1996, Pennywise began recording their fourth album. Thirsk left the band in an attempt to recover from his alcoholism. While initially successful, he relapsed and died from a self-inflicted gunshot wound to the chest on July 29, 1996. Their following album, Full Circle, was dedicated to his memory.

=== New bassist and continued popularity (1996–2002) ===
Following Thirsk's death, Bradbury rejoined the band as bassist and recorded their next album, Full Circle (1997). Despite the loss of the band's friend and bassist, the album came out several months after Thirsk's death and was dedicated in his honor. In tribute of Thirsk, the band re-recorded a song from their first album, "Bro-Hymn", and renamed it "Bro-Hymn (tribute)". The album artwork of Full Circle resembles the cover art from their first album.

The band's next album, Straight Ahead, was released in 1999. The album reached 62 on the Billboard 200, and 8 on the Australian Albums Chart. The album produced two singles: "Alien", which reached 36 on the Hot Modern Rock Tracks, and "Victim of Reality". An 18th track was released only in Australia and New Zealand, a cover of the Men at Work song "Down Under." The band ran into trouble while promoting their 1999 performance at KROQ's Weenie Roast on the Loveline radio show when an intoxicated Dragge held bandmate Bradbury and hosts Adam Carolla and Dr. Drew hostage in the studio by barricading the door with his 6-foot 5-inch, 300 pound body. The guitarist then said he was going to defecate into his hand and make Carolla eat it, threatened the hosts' lives, and claimed to have a hand grenade, but didn't. Police were called, but charges were not filed.

A live album, Live @ the Key Club, was released in 2000. It contained songs from all their previous albums. Land of the Free? was released in 2001 and ranked 67 on the Billboard 200 and number 21 on the Australian ARIA Albums Chart. The song "Who's on Your Side" was co-written by Brett Gurewitz (also known as Mr. Brett), a guitarist and songwriter for Bad Religion. That year the band took part in the Vans Warped 2001 tour.

Pennywise's music was featured in the 1997 SEGA arcade game Top Skater.

=== From the Ashes and The Fuse (2003–2006) ===
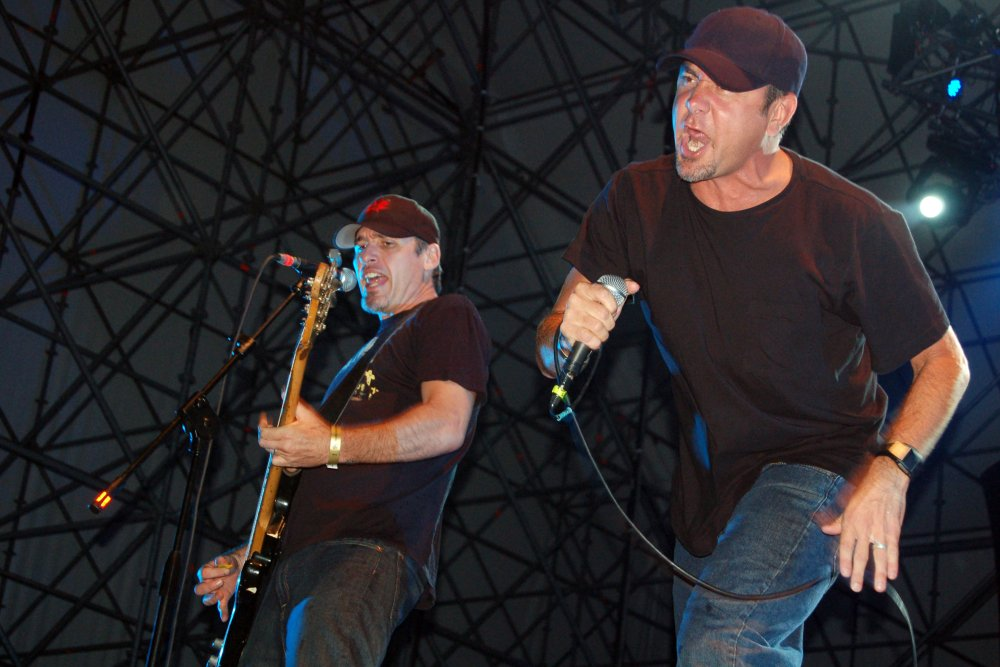
Jim Lindberg (right) and Randy Bradbury in 2006

From the Ashes was released on September 9, 2003 (United States), and reached number 54 on the Billboard 200, number 4 on the Top Independent Albums chart, and 13 Australian Albums Chart, marking the highest initial charting album in Pennywise's career. The album contained 14 tracks and retained no singles, although the song "Yesterdays" saw regular radio play on some stations.

Home Movies, the band's long-out of print 1995 VHS, was released on DVD for the first time in 2004. More footage of Pennywise can be seen on the Steve Martin film 45 Revolutions: A Slice of XVI St. Life, XVI St. being the place where Jason and Fletcher hung out in Hermosa Beach.

The band's eighth album, The Fuse, was released in Europe on June 27 and in North America on August 9, 2005. The album retained 15 tracks and charted number 36 on the Australian ARIA Album Charts. The band's Australian tour was canceled leading to breakup rumors, which Lindberg denied. Also that year, digitally-remastered versions of the first four studio albums were released.

Around 2006, Pennywise recorded a cover of Sick of It All's "My Life" for the band's 2007 tribute album, Our Impact Will Be Felt. Pennywise were one of many bands to contribute to the tribute.

=== Reason to Believe and split with Lindberg (2007–2009) ===
The band returned to the studio in 2007 to begin work on their ninth album, Reason to Believe, which was released on March 25, 2008. The album did not do well on the Billboard chart, but this was largely because the album was offered as a free download on Myspace, where over 400,000 copies were downloaded, making it one of their most successful albums. It peaked at No. 98 in the United States on the Billboard 200, and No. 46 in Australia on the ARIA Albums Chart. Reason to Believe did retain three singles, "The Western World", "Die For You", and "One reason".

In August 2009, Jim Lindberg announced he was leaving the band. By the time Lindberg left the group, Pennywise had begun writing new material for a tenth studio album. After the departure Lindberg formed the band The Black Pacific.

=== Zoli Téglás and All or Nothing (2009–2012) ===
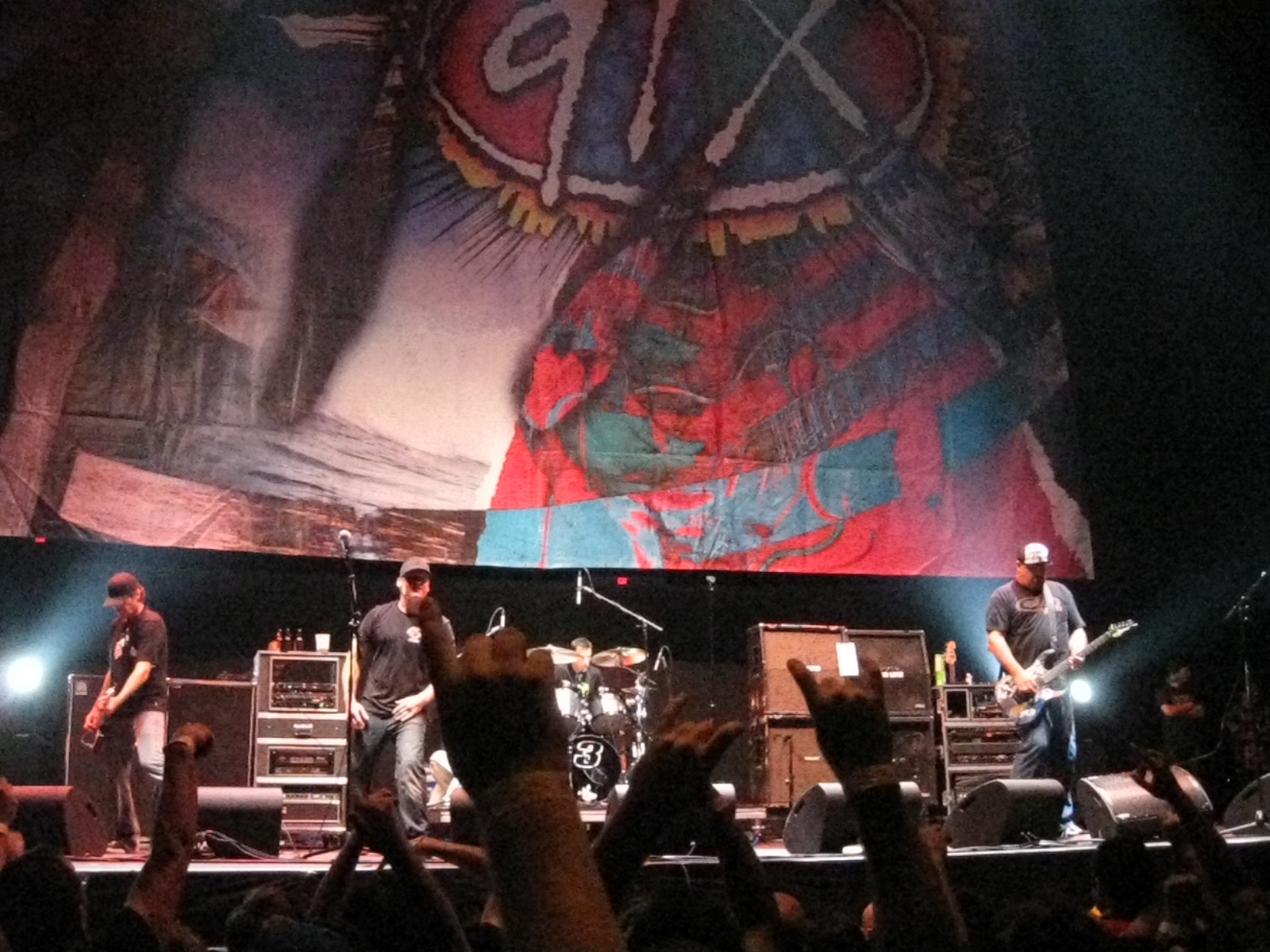
Pennywise in 2011 with Lindberg's replacement Zoli Téglás (second from left)

Zoli Téglás, frontman for OC hardcore/punk band Ignite, previously filled in on vocals during the band's set on the 2009 Smokeout Festival, while Lindberg was filming a documentary, The Other F Word, based on his book, Punk Rock Dad: No Rules, Just Real Life.

It was announced on February 16, 2010, that Téglás would become Jim's permanent replacement. In an interview with Zoli, he talked about his joining Pennywise and plans for a brand new Pennywise album. Ignite will continue on as a band with Zoli. However, the release of their new album was delayed, partly due to commitments with the 2010 Warped Tour. Guitarist Fletcher Dragge said in a July 2010 that it would be released around the beginning of 2011. The album's release date has since been pushed back again. On October 19, 2011, Pennywise announced on their Twitter page that they had begun work on their new album. On March 7, 2012, the band released the song "All or Nothing" from the album with the same title on KROQ's website.

Pennywise did a six-date South American tour in December 2010. After that, they toured Europe in January and February 2011, followed by Australia's Soundwave in February and March and three live dates in Japan in April.

=== Reunion with Lindberg, Yesterdays, Never Gonna Die and next album (2012–present) ===
Téglás injured his back during a June 2012 concert in Germany, requiring emergency surgery. Pennywise was forced to cancel all touring activity for the year to allow the singer to heal. However, Téglás wanted to leave the band and had been in touch with Lindberg, asking him to rejoin. In an appearance on KROQ-FM that October, Dragge and Lindberg announced Lindberg's return, to be celebrated with a January 2013 show at the Hollywood Palladium commemorating the band's 25th anniversary. Lindberg's return was at a South American Festival Tour, that started November 4 in São Paulo, Brazil.

As early as 2013, Pennywise began work on their eleventh studio album, Yesterdays, which was released on July 15, 2014, and is the band's first with Lindberg on vocals since 2008's Reason to Believe. Although Yesterdays is considered to be a proper studio album, it is a compilation of never-before released songs written by Pennywise's original bassist Jason Thirsk, and includes re-recordings of two songs, "No Way Out" and "Slowdown". To support Yesterdays, Pennywise embarked on the Summer Nationals 2014 from July to September, sharing the bill with Bad Religion, The Offspring, The Vandals, Stiff Little Fingers and Naked Raygun. The band also plans to release a box set.

As early as 2016, Pennywise began working on their twelfth studio album. In an October 2017 interview, Lindberg confirmed that Pennywise had finished recording their twelfth studio album, which was expected to be released in early 2018. On March 6, 2018, the band announced that the album, titled Never Gonna Die, would be released on April 20.

As of June 2020, Pennywise has been working on a new album.

The band is scheduled to embark on a short tour in May of 2026 with Circle Jerks, H20 and DFL.

== Musical style and lyrics ==
Pennywise has been described as punk rock, skate punk and melodic hardcore.

Pennywise's songs and lyrics tend to focus on themes such as positive mental attitude, as well as political and social events that the band finds wrong or disagreeable.

== Band members ==
=== Current members ===
- Fletcher Dragge – guitar, backing vocals (1988–present)
- Byron McMackin – drums, backing vocals (1988–present)
- Jim Lindberg – lead vocals (1988–1992, 1992–2009, 2012–present)
- Randy Bradbury – bass, backing vocals (1992, 1996–present)

=== Former members ===
- Jason Thirsk – bass, backing vocals (1988–1992, 1992–1996; his death), lead vocals (1988, 1992)
- Keith Brown – lead vocals, guitar (1988; died 1995)
- Hank Jacobson – drums (1988)
- Dave Quackenbush – lead vocals (1992)
- Zoli Téglás – lead vocals (2010–2012)

== Discography ==
=== Studio albums ===
- Pennywise (1991)
- Unknown Road (1993)
- About Time (1995)
- Full Circle (1997)
- Straight Ahead (1999)
- Land of the Free? (2001)
- From the Ashes (2003)
- The Fuse (2005)
- Reason to Believe (2008)
- All or Nothing (2012)
- Yesterdays (2014)
- Never Gonna Die (2018)
