= List of people from Rutherford, New Jersey =

Following is a list of people from Rutherford, New Jersey Those included were born in, are residents of, or otherwise closely associated with Rutherford.

== Art and architecture ==
- Alfred Andriola (1912–1983), cartoonist
- Thomas Le Clear (1818–1882), painter
- John Marin (1870–1953), early modernist artist
- Richard Cooper Newick (1926–2013), multihull sailboat designer
- Victor Victori (born 1943), portraitist, painter, sculptor and author

== Business ==
- Henry Becton, chairman of Becton, Dickinson and Company
- Maxwell Becton (1868–1951), co-founder of Becton Dickinson
- Fairleigh S. Dickinson (1866–1948), co-founder of Becton Dickinson and the named benefactor of Fairleigh Dickinson University
- Deana Haggag (born 1987), President and CEO of United States Artists
- Daniel Van Winkle (1816–1886), developer who sold the land of the Rutherfurd Park Association and laid out the street grid pattern for Rutherford

== Education ==
- Wilhelmina Marguerita Crosson (1900–1991), educator and school administrator known for her innovative teaching methods who was one of the first African-American female schoolteachers in Boston
- Henry Drucker (1942–2002), political scientist and university fund-raiser
- William Labov (born 1927), linguist and a professor emeritus in the linguistics department of the University of Pennsylvania
- Walter H. Stockmayer (1914–2004), chemist and university teacher
- Mary Zeiss Stange (1950–2024), academic and writer, who was a professor of women's studies and religious studies at Skidmore College

== Entertainment ==
- Howard Crook (born 1947), lyric tenor
- Charles Evered (born 1964), playwright and director
- Fireman Ed (born 1959), New York Jets unofficial mascot
- Beth Fowler (born 1940), actress
- Kim Kyung-jun (born 1987), violinist
- Bernie McInerney (born 1936), character actor
- René A. Morel (1932–2011), luthier
- Charlie Morrow (born 1942), sound artist, composer, conceptualist and performer
- Kate Pierson (born 1948), singer with The B-52's
- Kerry Davis (Born 1970), recording artist; member of American all-female punk band Red Aunts and creator of Two Tears
- Ellen R. Thompson (1928–2014), composer and music educator
- Chris Wragge (born 1970), news anchor for WCBS-TV
- Ramy Youssef (born 1991), stand-up comedian and writer, who is best known for his role as Ramy Hassan on the Hulu comedy series Ramy

== Law ==
- Guy Leverne Fake (1879–1957), United States federal judge

== Literature and journalism ==
- Robert Leckie (1920–2001), author
- Pamela McCorduck (1940–2021), author who wrote about the history and philosophical significance of artificial intelligence, the future of engineering, and the role of women and technology
- Peggy Noonan (born 1950), author of seven books and was Special Assistant to former president Ronald Reagan
- Brian Kim Stefans (born 1969), poet
- Jean Van Leeuwen (1937–2025), children's book author, of over forty children's books, including the Oliver Pig series
- Siobhan Vivian (born 1979), novelist, editor and screenwriter
- Alexander Russell Webb (1846–1916), writer and publisher
- William Carlos Williams (1883–1963), poet

== Military ==
- John Cridland Latham (1888–1975), Medal of Honor recipient
- Erin Conaton (born 1970), former United States Under Secretary of Defense for Personnel and Readiness who had previously served as Under Secretary of the Air Force
- Calvin J. Spann (1924–2015), an original Tuskegee Airman and fighter pilot with the 100th Fighter Squadron of the 332nd Fighter Group

== Politics ==
- George Dayton (1827–?), represented Bergen County in the New Jersey Senate from 1875 to 1877
- Fairleigh Dickinson Jr. (1920–1996), member of the New Jersey Senate in 1968
- Kathleen Donovan (born 1952), County Executive of Bergen County, New Jersey, who had previously been County Clerk and a member of the New Jersey General Assembly
- William H. J. Ely (1891–1942), district judge in New Jersey from 1924 to 1928 and represented Bergen County in the New Jersey Senate from 1932 to 1934
- Lou Frey (1934–2019), Republican politician and former member of the US House of Representatives from Florida
- Daniel Holsman, politician who represented Bergen County in the New Jersey Senate from 1863 to 1865
- Hugh A. Kelly Jr. (1923–1999), politician who served in the New Jersey Senate for a single term representing District 3B
- Thomas R. Pickering (born 1931), United States Ambassador to the United Nations from 1989 to 1992
- John Rutherfurd (1760–1840), United States Senator
- Winant Van Winkle (1879–1943), represented Bergen County in the New Jersey Senate from 1935 to 1940
- Walker Whiting Vick (1878–1926), an aide to Woodrow Wilson

== Sports ==
- Brant Alyea (born 1940), baseball player who hit a home run on the first pitch he saw in the majors. and grew up in Rutherford
- Jim Blumenstock (1918–1963), fullback who played for the New York Giants in the 1947 season
- Deedy Crosson (1898–1973), Negro league shortstop in the 1920s
- Crowbar (born 1974), former professional wrestler
- Jack Egbert (born 1983), MLB pitcher who played with the Chicago White Sox and New York Mets
- Jim Garrett (1930–2018), college football coach and professional football player
- Drew Gibbs (c. 1962–2021), football coach who was head coach of the Kean University Cougars during the 1989 season and was a head coach at Ramapo High School
- Bill Hands (born 1940), former professional baseball pitcher who was a 20-game winner for the Chicago Cubs
- Kelly Hecking (born 1980), former backstroke and freestyle competition swimmer
- Frank Herrmann (born 1984), pitcher for the Cleveland Indians
- Art Hillhouse (1916–1980), professional basketball center who played two seasons in the Basketball Association of America for the Philadelphia Warriors
- Bobby Jones (born 1972), former pitcher who played for the New York Mets
- Rodney Leinhardt (born 1970), professional wrestler
- Vin Mazzaro (born 1986), pitcher for the Kansas City Royals
- Da'Mon Merkerson (born 1989), football cornerback who played for the Arizona Rattlers of the Arena Football League
- Shaun O'Hara (born 1977), center for the New York Giants
- Pat Pacillo (born 1963), pitcher for Cincinnati Reds who debuted on May 23, 1987
- Leo Paquin (1910–1993), end for Fordham University as part of the 1936 line known as the "Seven Blocks of Granite"
- Percy Prince (1887–1973), English amateur footballer who played as a centre-forward for Southampton and Boscombe in the early 20th century
- Jim Spanarkel (born 1957), former professional basketball player for the Dallas Mavericks and the Philadelphia 76ers
- Michael Strahan (born 1971), former defensive end for the New York Giants
- Harry Lancaster Towe (1898–1977), Congressman who represented New Jersey's 9th congressional district from 1943 to 1951
- Stan Walters (born 1948), a former offensive tackle who played for the Cincinnati Bengals and the Philadelphia Eagles
- Corey Wootton (born 1987), defensive end for the Chicago Bears
