= Claw hammer (disambiguation) =

A claw hammer is a type of hammer.

Claw hammer or Clawhammer may also refer to:

- Clawhammer, a style of banjo playing
- Claw Hammer, an indie rock band active 1986–2000
- "Claw Hammer", a song from Elton John's 2016 album Wonderful Crazy Night
- Athlon 64, a microprocessor released 2003, also called ClawHammer
