= Frank Serrao =

American football player and coach (1918–1991)

Biographical details
- Born: August 10, 1918
- Died: May 6, 1991 (aged 72); San Bernardino, California, U.S.

Playing career

Football
- 1939–1940: Bucknell
- Position: Fullback

Coaching career (HC unless noted)

Football
- 1948: Rutherford HS (NJ) (backfield)
- 1949–1952: Rutherford HS (NJ)
- 1954–1956: Redlands HS (CA) (assistant)
- 1957–1963: Redlands HS (CA)
- 1964–1983: Redlands

Head coaching record
- Overall: 115–80–1 (college football)
- Tournaments: 1–1 (NAIA D-II playoffs)

Accomplishments and honors

Championships
- 9 SCIAC (1966, 1970, 1973–1978, 1980)

Frank Serrao (August 10, 1918 – May 6, 1991) was an American football coach. He served as the head football coach at Redlands University in Redlands, California from 1964 to 1983, compiling a record of 115–80–1. Serrao led his 1976 Redlands team to the title game of the NAIA Division II Football National Championship, losing to Joe Fusco's Westminster Titans.

Serrao attended Rutherford High School in Rutherford, New Jersey, where he played football as a fullback and linebacker and captained the 1936 team. Jim Blumenstock, who later played college football at Fordham University and professionally with the New York Giants of the National Football League (NFL), was a teammate of Serrao on Rutherford's football squad. Serrao also participated in track at Rutherford. He was the shot put champion of the North Jersey League for two years. His farthest throw was 48 feet (15 m), but he lost out by six inches at a state meet to Monte Irvin, who went on to play professional baseball in the Negro leagues and Major League Baseball (MLB). After graduating from Rutherford, Serrao moved on to Bucknell University, lettering for two seasons on the Bucknell Bison football team and playing mostly as a fullback. He also lettered three times on the track team, competing in the shot put. Serrao graduated from Bucknell in 1941 and joined the Army Air Forces in July 1942, serving as a mechanic and reaching the rank of staff sergeant.

Serrao earned a master's degree in physical education at New York University and then began his coaching career in 1948 at his alma mater, Rutherford High School, working as backfield coach under George Melinkovich. Serrao succeed Melinkovich as head coach in 1949 when Melinkovich left to become head football coach at Utah State University. Serrao also coached basketball and track at Rutherford.

Serrao died on May 6, 1991, at St. Bernardine Medical Center in San Bernardino, California following complications from open-heart surgery performed two weeks prior.

== Head coaching record ==
=== College football ===
Year	Team	Overall	Conference	Standing	Bowl/playoffs
Redlands Bulldogs (Southern California Intercollegiate Athletic Conference) (1964–1983)
1964	Redlands	5–4	3–1	2nd	
1965	Redlands	4–6	2–2	T–3rd	
1966	Redlands	7–3	4–1	1st	
1967	Redlands	5–5	3–2	T–2nd	
1968	Redlands	5–5	3–2	3rd	
1969	Redlands	7–2	3–1	2nd	
1970	Redlands	6–4	3–1	T–1st	
1971	Redlands	2–8	1–4	6th	
1972	Redlands	5–5	4–1	2nd	
1973	Redlands	8–1	5–0	1st	
1974	Redlands	7–2	5–0	1st	
1975	Redlands	7–2–1	4–0–1	T–1st	
1976	Redlands	10–2	5–0	1st	L NAIA Division II Championship
1977	Redlands	6–3	5–0	1st	
1978	Redlands	9–1	5–0	1st	
1979	Redlands	3–6	3–2	T–2nd	
1980	Redlands	6–4	5–0	1st	
1981	Redlands	5–5	3–2	3rd	
1982	Redlands	4–6	3–2	T–3rd	
1983	Redlands	4–6	2–3	T–3rd	
Redlands:		115–80–1	71–24–1		
Total:		115–80–1			
National championship Conference title Conference division title or championship game berth
