= The Humpers =

American garage punk band

The Humpers were an American garage punk band, formed in 1989, led by Scott "Deluxe" Drake, formerly of The Suicide Kings.

== History ==
Despite being based out of Long Beach, California, they recorded their first EP, My Machine, for a Yugoslav Zagreb based independent label, Zdenko Franjić's Slušaj Najglasnije (Listen Loudest). The Made in Yugoslavia printed on the record sleeve was first interpreted as a joke, and then as indication that the band is very popular in Yugoslavia, even though the members haven't even been to the country yet. They released two full-lengths for Sympathy for the Record Industry which were highly praised and three for Caroline/Epitaph. The Humpers, along with label mates The Lazy Cowgirls, The Red Aunts, Trash Can School and Clawhammer, were part of a "garage rock renaissance" which hit Los Angeles in the early 1990s. Rabid fans and packed, rock-friendly clubs such as Raji's in Hollywood and Bogart's in Long Beach helped lay the foundation for their success. Most of their appeal lay in the driving sonic force of guitarist Jeff Fieldhouse as well as the blistering vocals of Drake. After signing to Epitaph in 1995, The Humpers went on to tour extensively in the US and Europe, garnering a large international following.

Scott "Deluxe" Drake, along with Jeff Fieldhouse went on to found the band The Lovesores, in Portland, OR, releasing their first 7 inch record, Fast Friends, in 2012. In 2020, after The Lovesores released their final album, Bats From Planet Skull, Drake, Fieldhouse and Lovesores guitarist Saul Koll, went on to form Portland super group, Guerrilla Teens, with Anna Andersen and Tim Connolly, of The Suicide Notes.

== Discography ==
=== Studio albums ===
- Euphoria, Confusion, Anger, Remorse (Epitaph Records, 1998)
- Plastique Valentine (Epitaph Records, 1997)
- Live Forever or Die Trying (Epitaph Records, 1996)
- Journey to the Center of Your Wallet (Sympathy for the Record Industry, 1994)
- Positively Sick on 4th Street (Sympathy for the Record Industry, 1993)
- My Machine (1990)

=== EPs ===
- Contractual Obligation (Sympathy for the Record Industry, 1996)
- The Dionysus Years (1996)

=== Music videos ===
- Fast, F*cked and Furious (1994)
- Space Station Love (1994)
- Wake Up & Lose (1996)
- Mutate with Me (1997)
- Plastique Valentine (1997)

=== Compilations ===
- Their Sympathetic Majesties Request Vol. 2 (Single Song-"St. Jon") (2001)
- (1998) Punk-O-Rama Vol. 3 (Single Song-"Steel-Toed Sneakers")
- (1998) Goin' After Pussy: Teasers & Tidbits (Single Song-"Mutate with Me")
- (1996) Punk-O-Rama Vol. 2 (Single Song-"Mutate with Me")
- (1995) Happy Birthday, Baby Jesus (Single Song-"Run, Run Rudolph")
- (1995) Punk Rock Xmas (Single Song-"Run, Run Rudolph")
- (1995) RAFR (Single Song-"Thirteen Forever")
- (1992) “I Give You The Head of Corporate Rock and Roll Vol 1 Live on KPFK 90.7FM (Single Song-“Apocalypse Girl”)
