= Drag (Red Aunts album) =

Studio album by Red Aunts
- Released: 1993
- Genre: Punk rock
- Length: 44:54
- Label: Sympathy for the Record Industry

Red Aunts chronology
Drag (1993)	Bad Motherfucken 40 O-Z (1994)

Drag is the first full-length album by the Red Aunts. It was released in 1993 on Sympathy for the Record Industry.

== Track listing ==
1. "Kung Fu Kitten" – 3:45
2. "Sleeping Pill" – 2:12
3. "Lethal Lolita" – 2:23
4. "Hot Rod" – 2:58
5. "Sleeping in the Wet Spot" – 2:44
6. "Route 66 Fucken 6" – 2:49
7. "Lonely Beer Drops" – 2:05
8. "Built for a Barstool" – 4:51
9. "Luz" – 2:13
10. "Teach Me to Kill" – 2:14
11. "My Cat Scratch" – 3:43
12. "Sweet Enough" – 2:34
13. "Fly Ford Comet/Ho Choice" – 2:05
14. "Sex Zombie" – 2:51
15. "Hard Hearted Hannah" – 5:27
