= Rutherford High School (New Jersey) =

High school in Bergen County, New Jersey, US

Location
- 56 Elliott Place; Rutherford, Bergen County, New Jersey 07070; United States; 40.828407°N 74.108466°W

Information
- Type: Public high school
- Established: 1922
- NCES School ID: 341446000810
- Principal: Frank Morano
- Faculty: 68.8 FTEs
- Enrollment: 727 (as of 2024–25)
- Student to teacher ratio: 10.6:1
- Colors: Navy blue and white
- Athletics conference: North Jersey Interscholastic Conference
- Team name: Bulldogs
- Website: www.rutherfordschools.org/rhs/

Rutherford High School is a comprehensive four-year public high school located in Rutherford, in Bergen County, in the U.S. state of New Jersey, operating as part of the Rutherford School District. The original structure was built in 1922 and expanded in 1938, 1957 and 2005. Rutherford High School is overseen by the New Jersey Department of Education and has been accredited by the Middle States Association of Colleges and Schools Commission on Elementary and Secondary Schools since 1940.

As of the 2024–25 school year, the school had an enrollment of 727 students and 68.8 classroom teachers (on an FTE basis), for a student–teacher ratio of 10.6:1. There were 21 students (2.9% of enrollment) eligible for free lunch and 8 (1.1% of students) eligible for reduced-cost lunch.

== Awards, recognition and rankings ==
During the 1999-2000 school year, the school was awarded the Blue Ribbon School Award of Excellence by the United States Department of Education, the highest award an American school can receive, which recognized the school's use of technology in the instruction process in which every classroom was wired for Internet access and a substantially higher than average level of access by students to computers.

The school was the 124th-ranked public high school in New Jersey out of 339 schools statewide in New Jersey Monthly magazine's September 2014 cover story on the state's "Top Public High Schools", using a new ranking methodology. The school had been ranked 71st in the state of 328 schools in 2012, after being ranked 73rd in 2010 out of 322 schools listed. The magazine ranked the school 72nd in 2008 out of 316 schools. The school was ranked 88th in the magazine's September 2006 issue, which included 316 schools across the state. Schooldigger.com ranked the school tied for 141st out of 381 public high schools statewide in its 2011 rankings (unchanged from the 2010 ranking) which were based on the combined percentage of students classified as proficient or above proficient on the mathematics (86.2%) and language arts literacy (92.0%) components of the High School Proficiency Assessment (HSPA).

== Curriculum and facilities ==
Rutherford High offers courses ranging from Honors classes to Advanced Placement (AP) classes for college credit. The elective classes are also offered, ranging from classes of technology, to those that are career-related as well. The school contains a television studio that is used for morning announcements in homeroom and sends out feeds for the local public access station. There is a newly expanded library with 23 computers and over 20,000 books. Two gyms house athletic programs and physical education classes. Located on the East Wing of the school features a half-size Olympic-style swimming pool currently leased by the YMCA of the Meadowlands. It is also used by the Rutherford Bulldogs Swim Team.

== Student life ==
A typical day at Rutherford High starts at 7:50 AM when homeroom starts. School is in session five days a week. There are 7 blocks, consisting of 57-minute classes that are on a rotating block schedule and one lunch period, ending the day at 2:48 PM. Extra-curricular activities include an abundance of clubs, academic groups, and music programs.

== Academic teams and extracurricular activities ==
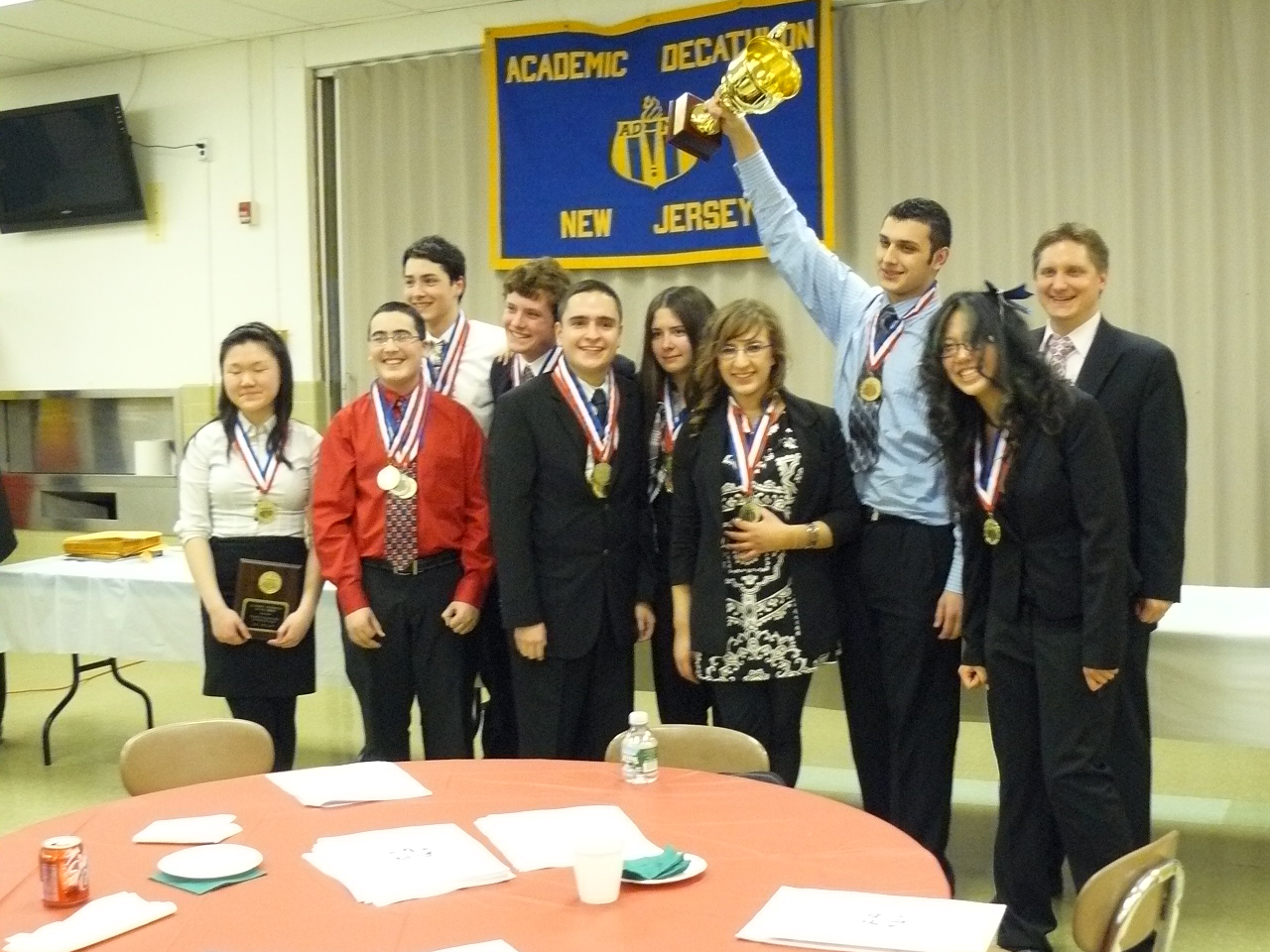
Rutherford Academic Decathlon wins New Jersey state championship for the second consecutive year.

Rutherford High School has a host of academic teams and non-athletic extracurricular activities.

Rutherford was the Academic Decathlon champion for the state of New Jersey, having represented New Jersey at the National Competition in Memphis, Tennessee in April 2009, and competed once again in Omaha in April 2010.

The theater arts program puts out two performances each school year; a play in November, and a musical in March.

== Athletics ==
2005 Group II State Champs

The Rutherford High School Bulldogs participate in the North Jersey Interscholastic Conference, which is comprised of small-enrollment schools in Bergen, Hudson, Morris and Passaic counties, and was created following a reorganization of sports leagues in Northern New Jersey by the New Jersey State Interscholastic Athletic Association (NJSIAA). Prior to the realignment that took effect in the fall of 2010, Rutherford was a member of the Bergen County Scholastic League (BCSL) American Division. With 568 students in grades 10-12, the school was classified by the NJSIAA for the 2019–20 school year as Group IV for most athletic competition purposes, which included schools with an enrollment of 486 to 758 students in that grade range. The school was classified by the NJSIAA as Group II North for football for 2024–2026, which included schools with 484 to 683 students.

Interscholastic sports that are offered by the Rutherford athletic program include:

- Fall Sports: B/G Cross Country, Football, Girls' Tennis, B/G Soccer, Volleyball, Cheerleading
- Winter Sports: B/G Basketball, B/G Swimming, B/G Track & Field, Wrestling, Coed Bowling
- Spring Sports: Baseball, Boys' Tennis, Softball, B/G Track & Field

The school’s main rival is Becton Regional High School in neighboring East Rutherford. During games, students sometimes repeatedly chant “Why is it called East Rutherford if it’s north of Rutherford?”

The boys track team won the Group IV spring / outdoor track state championship in 1922 and 1923.

The boys' cross country team won the overall public school state championship in 1926.

The boys' basketball team won the Group III state championship in 1940 (defeating Bound Brook High School in the tournament final) and 1942 (vs. Merchantville High School), and won the Group II title in 1985 (vs. Burlington City High School). The 1940 team pulled ahead by 23-12 at the half and held off a late rally to upset Bound Brook by a final score of 42-33 in the championship game.

The boys' track team won the Group I / II state indoor relay championship in 1969.

The baseball team won the Group II state title in 1992 (vs. Kingsway Regional High School), 2004 (vs. Sterling High School) and in 2005 (vs. Seneca High School).

The girls volleyball team won the Group II state championship in 1991 (against runner-up Mahwah High School in the final match of the playoffs), 1992 (vs. Dumont High School) and 1994 (vs. Elmwood Park Memorial High School).

In 2007, the girls' soccer team, seeded #3, won the North II, Group II state sectional championship with a 5-4 win on penalty kicks over top-seeded Summit High School in the tournament final, the team's first title in this section.

The football team won the North II Group II state sectional championship in 2017 and 2018. In 2017, the football team finished the season with a 12-0 record and won its first championship in the playoff era, defeating sixth-seeded Hackettstown High School in the finals of the North II Group II state sectional tournament, in a game played at MetLife Stadium. The 2018 team won the program's second consecutive sectional title, defeating Lyndhurst High School by a 32-14 score in the tournament final and went on to win the inaugural North Group II bowl game with a 62-14 win against Kittatinny Regional High School.

The boys soccer team became Northeast Group 2-B regional champions in 2020 by beating Northern Valley Regional High School at Demarest by a score of 3-1 in the final of the tournament that had been reconfigured due to the COVID pandemic. It was the program's first ever state title.

== Administration ==
The school's principal is Frank Morano. His core administration team includes the assistant principal.

== Notable alumni ==
Notable alumni of Rutherford High School's include:

- Brant Alyea (born 1940), former MLB outfielder from 1965 to 1972, who is one of nine players to hit a home run on his first MLB pitch.
- Henry Becton (1914–2009), chairman of Becton Dickinson and Company
- Jim Blumenstock (1918–1963), American football fullback who played in the NFL for the New York Giants.
- Henry Drucker (1942–2002), political scientist and university fund-raiser
- Charles Evered (born 1964), playwright and director.
- Lou Frey (born 1934), former member of the United States House of Representatives from Florida.
- Jim Garrett (born 1930), college football coach.
- Bill Hands (born 1940), former Major League Baseball pitcher.
- Kelly Hecking (born 1980), former backstroke and freestyle competition swimmer.
- Art Hillhouse (1916–1980), professional basketball center who played two seasons in the Basketball Association of America for the Philadelphia Warriors.
- James A. Hyslop (1885-1953), entomologist who founded the Insect Pest Survey of the U.S. Bureau of Entomology and Plant Quarantine.
- Nancy Kedersha (born 1951, class of 1969), cell biology and micrographer.
- Kim Kyung-jun (born 1987), violinist.
- Vin Mazzaro (born 1986), pitcher for the Kansas City Royals.
- Pamela McCorduck (1940–2021), author who wrote about the history and philosophical significance of artificial intelligence, the future of engineering, and the role of women and technology.
- Peggy Noonan (born 1950), speechwriter for U.S. presidents Ronald Reagan and George H. W. Bush.
- Pat Pacillo (born 1963), pitcher who played two seasons for the Cincinnati Reds.
- Thomas R. Pickering (born 1931), United States Ambassador to the United Nations from 1989 to 1992.
- Frank Serrao (1918–1991, class of 1937), head football coach at Redlands University in Redlands, California from 1964 to 1983, where he compiled a record of 115–80–1.
- Calvin J. Spann (1924-2015), an original Tuskegee Airman and fighter pilot with the 100th Fighter Squadron of the 332nd Fighter Group.
- Siobhan Vivian (born 1979, class of 1997), novelist, editor and screenwriter.
- John Wallace, head coach of the Rutgers football team from 1924 to 1926.
- Ramy Youssef (born 1991), stand-up comedian and writer, who is best known for his role as Ramy Hassan on the Hulu comedy series Ramy
