= Ghetto Blaster (Red Aunts album) =

Last full length album by the Red Aunts

Studio album by Red Aunts
- Released: 1998
- Genre: Punk rock
- Length: 31:31
- Label: Epitaph
- Producer: Mick Collins

Red Aunts chronology
Saltbox (1996)	Ghetto Blaster (1998)

Ghetto Blaster is the last full-length album by the Red Aunts. It was released on April 21, 1998, on Epitaph Records.

It was produced by Mick Collins, of the Gories.

== Critical reception ==
The Albuquerque Journal called the album a "garage rock classic," listing it as one of the best albums of 1998. The San Diego Union-Tribune wrote that "these no-nonsense punk rock grrrls capture the intensity of a small club, and more important, the noisiness of one, too."

== Track listing ==
1. "I'm Crying" – 3:54
2. "Poison Steak" – 2:04
3. "The Things You See, The Things You Don't" – 2:01
4. "Midnight in the Jungle" – 3:29
5. "Exene" – 2:59
6. "Fade In/Fade Out" – 3:07
7. "Alright!" – 2:11
8. "Who?" – 2:08
9. "Skeleton Hand" – 3:29
10. "Wrecked" – 1:39
11. "I'm Bored With You" – 0:40
12. "Cookin', Cleanin' and Cryin'" – 3:50
