= The Creamers =

American punk rock band

- Origin: Los Angeles, California, United States
- Genre: Punk rock
- Years active: 1986–present
- Labels: Sympathy for the Record Industry, Triple X, Dogmeat Records (Australia), Goofball Music, Negative Reaction Records, No Tomorrow, Fierce, 1+2 (Japan)
- Members: Leesa G. (sometimes credited as Leesa Poole); R.J. Gallentine; Bob Deagle; Joe Matthews; Rosa Saenz-Kollar (sometimes credited as Rosa Saenz)
- Past members: Andi Beltramo; Lenny Keringer; Heather Fremling; Judy Toy

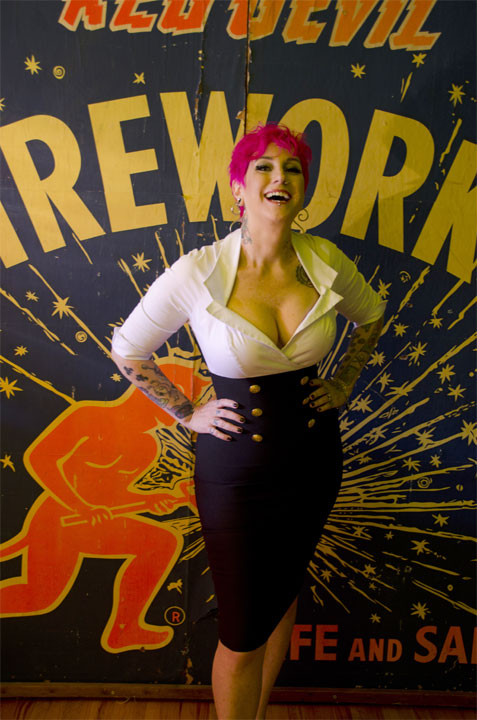
Leesa G. (The Creamers) 2012

The Creamers are an American punk rock band from Los Angeles, California, United States. Formed in 1986, their melodic and energetic approach to music has been compared to the New York Dolls and Ramones. Over their 35-year career The Creamers have released three albums and countless singles, EPs and compilations. A career spanning CD/DVD anthology comprising unreleased songs, live footage, a documentary and new material is planned for a 2013 release by Negative Reaction Records. The band continues to record and make occasional live appearances.

== Discography ==
Studio albums

- Love, Honor, & Obey (1989, Sympathy for the Record Industry)
- Stick It in Your Ear (1991, Triple X)
- Hurry Up & Wait (1993, Triple X)

EPs

- The Creamers (1990, Dog Meat)
- Two Olives (And a Bottle of Gin) (1996, No Tomorrow)
- Anything We Damn Well Please (1994, Triple X)
- All Girl Kung Fu Army (1996, Goofball Music)

Singles

- "Broken Record" (1988, Goofball Music)
- "Sunday Head" (1990, Fierce Recordings)
- "Bob Kringle" (1990, Sympathy for the Record Industry)
- "Dead Weight" (1991, Triple X)
- "He Needed Killin'" (1996, 1 + 2)
- "Two Olives & A Bottle of Gin" (1996, No Tomorrow)

Compilations

- Happy Birthday Baby Jesus (Sympathy For The Record Industry)
- Gabba Gabba Hey A Tribute To The Ramones (1991, Triple X)
- The Big One (1991, Flipside)

Anthologies

- This Stuff'll Kill Ya (1995, Triple X)
- Cat's Meow (2013, Negative Reaction)
