= Matson Jones =

Indie rock band

- Origin: Fort Collins, Colorado
- Genres: Indie rock
- Years active: 2003–2008
- Labels: Sympathy for the Record Industry

Matson Jones was an indie rock group from Fort Collins, Colorado, formed in 2003. Its members included Martina Grbac and Anna Mascorella, both of whom played cello in the band as well as contributing vocals. The other two members were Ross Harada, the drummer, and Matt Regan, who played the upright bass.

== History ==
They self-released their self-titled debut album in 2004, and it was re-released on the Sympathy for the Record Industry record label in June 2005. The band signed an informal agreement with Sympathy for the Record Industry after the label's founder Long Gone John was impressed with some of their live performances. In 2006, the band released a four-track mini album entitled The Albatross Mates for Life, but Only After a Lengthy Courtship That Can Take Up to Four Years, also on Sympathy for the Record Industry. After a year-long hiatus, Matson Jones broke up amicably in 2008. Mascorella, Grbac and Harada later reunited in 2010 and began writing and recording new music under the name Land Lines. Regan did not join the reunited group because he no longer lived in Colorado at the time.
