= List of Sympathy for the Record Industry artists =

This is an overview of active and former artists signed to Sympathy for the Record Industry.

== Active Roster ==
- The Dwarves
- El Vez
- Helen Love
- April March
- Scarling.
- Veruca Salt
- The Willowz

== Selected Passive/Defunct/Alumnus Roster ==
- The 5.6.7.8's
- Acid King
- Bad Religion
- Billy Childish
- The Detroit Cobras
- The Electrocutes
- Roky Erickson
- Gas Huffer
- Geraldine Fibbers
- The Gizmos
- The Gun Club
- Holly Golightly
- Hole
- Hot Snakes
- Jack Off Jill
- Lubricated Goat
- Man or Astro-man?
- The Muffs
- Redd Kross
- Reigning Sound
- Rocket From The Crypt
- The Scientists
- Sonic Boom
- Southern Culture on the Skids
- Spacemen 3
- Suicide
- Turbonegro
- The Upholsterers (Jack White's side project)
- The Von Bondies
- Whirlwind Heat
- The White Stripes

== See also ==
- Sympathy for the Record Industry
