= Thank the Holder Uppers =

Studio album by Claw Hammer
- Released: 1995
- Label: Interscope
- Producer: Brett Gurewitz

Claw Hammer chronology
Pablum (1993)	Thank the Holder Uppers (1995)	'Scuse the Excursion (1996)

Thank the Holder Uppers is an album by the American band Claw Hammer. The band's first major label album, it was released in 1995 via Interscope Records. Claw Hammer supported the album with a North American tour.

== Production ==
The album was produced by Brett Gurewitz, the head of the band's former label. The band often added harmonica, saxophone, and piano to the album's longer tracks.

== Critical reception ==
Professional ratings
Review scores
Source	Rating
AllMusic	3/5 stars
Calgary Herald	B
The Encyclopedia of Popular Music	3/5 stars
Los Angeles Times	3/4 stars
The San Diego Union-Tribune	1.5/4 stars

The Washington Post wrote that singer John Wahl's "high (and erratically) pitched vocals and Christopher Bagarozzi's guitar-hero fretwork may recall Led Zep, but the band's rhythms and sense of structure owe more to Captain Beefheart." Trouser Press thought that "the foursome caper rowdily like (dead end) kids set loose in a candy store."

Westword opined that the songs "may sometimes seem quizzical—'Blind Pig' is the weirdest imaginable ZZ Top imitation, while 'Olfactory Blues/Nosehair' resembles a bizarre marriage of Frank Zappa and, well, Foghat—but they're never, never boring." CMJ New Music Monthly declared that, "problem is, these guys seem a little too proficient on their instruments, enamored of severe (and frequent) tempo changes for the sake of keeping themselves interested." LA Weekly praised the "exceptional guitarists and crackerjack drummer, Bob Lee."

AllMusic wrote: "In sum, think of Funhouse-era Stooges with a few more instruments and slightly quiet moments, almost as good a vocalist and crisp production, and there's Holder Uppers in a nutshell." In another retrospective review, Spin deemed the album "a totally unmarketable combo of cartoonishly venomous wails, chainsaw riffs, and harmonica solos."

== Track listing ==
No.	Title	Length
1.	"Super Things"
2.	"When Dan's in Town"
3.	"Sweaty Palms"
4.	"Five Fifths Dead"
5.	"The Bums on the Flow"
6.	"Hollow Legs"
7.	"Bedside Coffee Table Roses"
8.	"Blind Pig"
9.	"Each Hit"
10.	"Lazy Brains"
11.	"Olfactory Blues/Nose Hair"

== Personnel ==
- Chris Bagarozzi – guitar
- Bob Lee – drums
- John Wahl – vocals, guitar, harmonica
- Rob Walther – bass
