= Pat Todd & the Rankoutsiders =

Punk rock band from Los Angeles, California

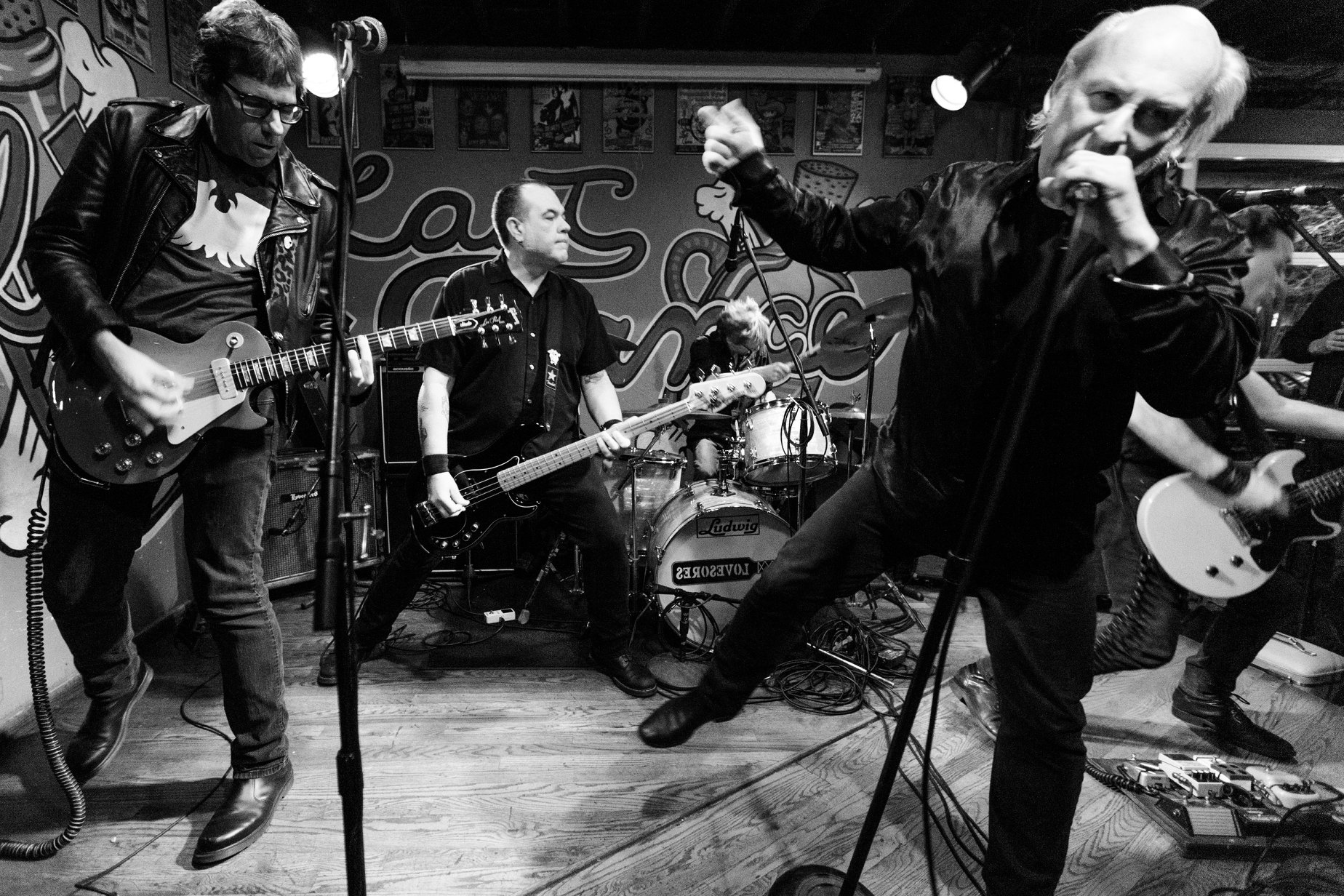
- Slim's Last Chance, Seattle 2019 by Mari Tamura

Background information
- Origin: Los Angeles, California
- Genres: Punk rock
- Years active: 2000s–present
- Label: Rankoutsider Records
- Members: Pat Todd; Nick Alexander; Kevin Keller; Stephen Vigh; Walter Phelan
- Website: www.pattodd.net

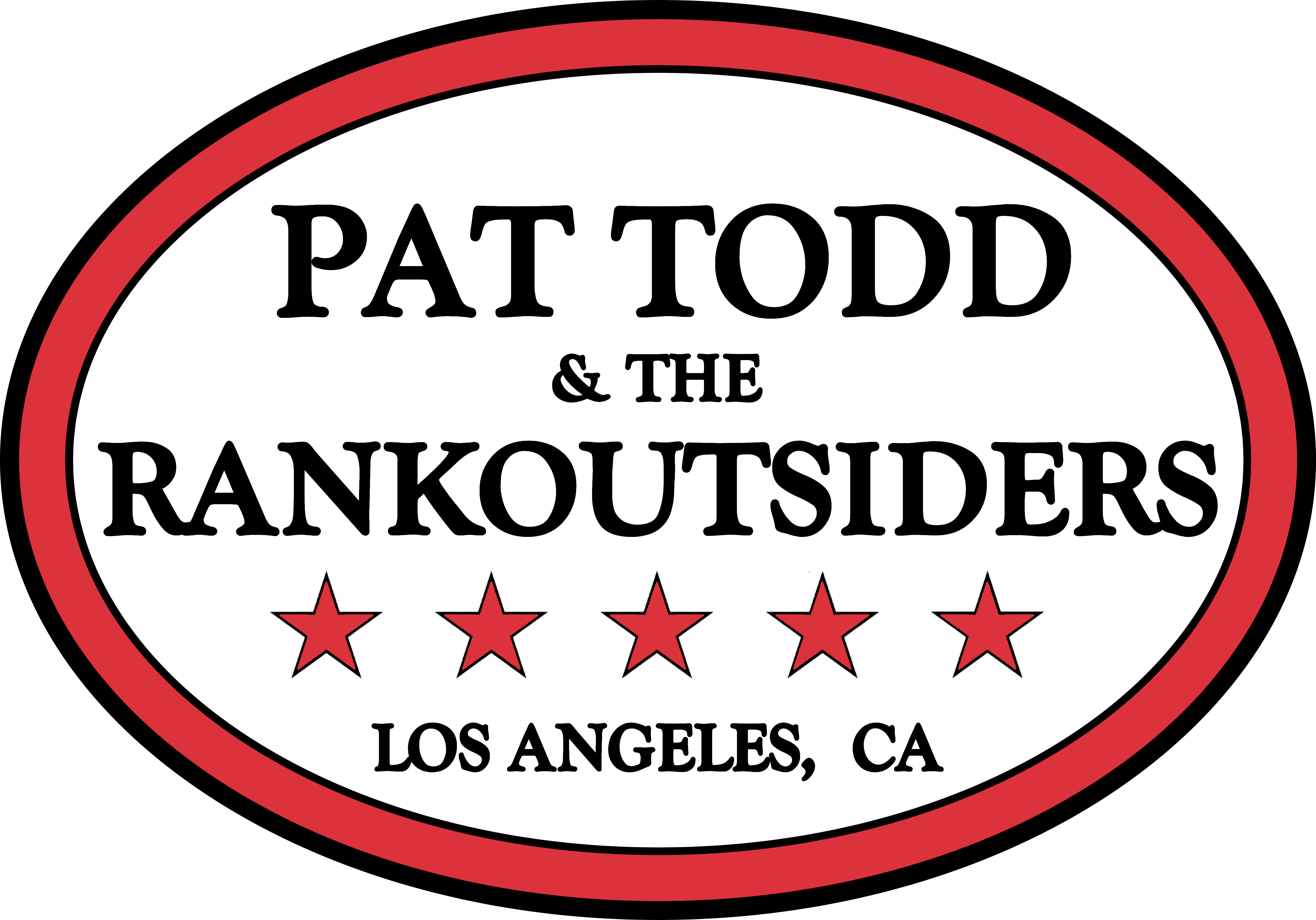
Pat Todd & the Rankoutsiders logo

Pat Todd & the Rankoutsiders are a Los Angeles, California-based punk rock band. The group was founded by Pat Todd, the former lead singer of the punk rock band Lazy Cowgirls, after the Cowgirls broke up in 2004. The Rankoutsiders' music is less influenced by cowpunk than was that of the Cowgirls.

== History ==
Formed in 2005 by Pat Todd after the Lazy Cowgirls split in 2004, Pat Todd & the Rankoutsiders first lineup consisted of Pat Todd (vocals and acoustic guitar), Nick Alexander (guitar and vocals), Rick Johnson (bass and vocals), Erik Kristiansen (guitar and vocals) and Bob Deagle (drums). Deagle and Johnson were also former members of the Lazy Cowgirls respectively.

In 2006, Kristiansen was replaced by Tony Hannaford. The band issued their first release in 2007, the double album The Outskirts of Your Heart. Its lineup consists of Todd (vocals), Nick Alexander and Tony Hannaford (guitar), Rick Johnson (bass guitar), and Bob Deagle (drums). In 2017, a tenth anniversary reissue of the album was released.

Their second album, Holdin' onto Trouble's Hand, was released in 2008.

Their third album, 14th & Nowhere, was released in 2013.

It was followed by Blood & Treasure in 2016.

== Critical reception ==
Holdin' onto Trouble's Hand was described as a "terrific, ass-kicking, knee-slapping" album by John M. James of the River Cities' Reader. Jud Cost of Blurt gave the album an 8 out of 10 rating. In his review, he wrote that despite the Cowgirls being defunct, "Todd's still one of the most electric frontmen in the business, the rare bird who understands there's really not that much difference between the lost-highway racket made by the Ramones, the Rolling Stones and Hank Williams."

Nick Kuzmack of SLUG Magazine wrote that 14th and Nowhere "...is full of high energy that plays on the tradition of the last 75 years of American rock n’ roll, best played out on the title track with some exciting, fast and gritty chords, no doubt influenced by the likes of Chuck Berry."

Jaime Pina of Punk Globe described Blood & Treasure as "...a tasty concoction of high velocity fun."

== Discography ==
- The Outskirts of Your Heart (Rankoutsider, 2007)
- Holdin' onto Trouble's Hand (Rankoutsider, 2008)
- 14th and Nowhere (Rankoutsider, 2013)
- Blood & Treasure (Rankoutsider, 2016)
- The Past Came Callin’ (Hound Gawd! Records, 2019)
- There's Pretty Things in Palookaville... (Hound Gawd! Records, 2021)
- Sons Of The City Ditch (Dog Meat, 2023)
