= Pussy Crush =

English pop punk music group

- Origin: Brighton, England
- Genres: Pop Punk
- Years active: 1993-1997
- Labels: La-Di-Da, Sympathy for the Record Industry

Pussy Crush is a female-led pop punk music group from Brighton, England. Mainly active between 1993 and 1997, the group released a number of records and received airplay from BBC Radio 1.

== History ==
Pussy Crush is from the Burgess Hill area of Brighton, England. The 4-piece group became active c. 1993 and is composed of Kags on vocals, Pilly on drums, Joe on guitar, and Carl on bass. Their sound has been described in the music press as pop punk and "garagey pop", with the female vocals being the differentiation from their peers, and drawing comparisons to L7 and Blondie.

Pussy Crush released their debut album, Tormenting The Emotionally Frail, in 1995. The album received positive critical reception with Dawn Sutter, writing for CMJ magazine, highlighting the "perfect balance of slow, subtle songs and upbeat pogo-rock". The 1996 follow up album, Zero for Sweet Talk, was reviewed as "high energy, punk rock, great vocals and sarcastic lyrics" by Maximum Rocknroll. That same year they released the 3-track EP "Punk Friction" on the Sympathy for the Record Industry label, though critical reception was lacklustre. In 1997 the Pussy Crush track "Beat Your Heart Out" was featured on a compilation album, The Great Lawnmower Conspiracy, featuring top bands from the county of Sussex.

The group performed two Peel Sessions on BBC Radio 1, the first in 1994 and the second in 1996.

== Discography ==
=== Singles/EPs ===
- "Punk Friction" (1996)

=== Albums ===
- Tormenting The Emotionally Frail (1995)
- Zero for Sweet Talk (1996)
