= Euphoria, Confusion, Anger, Remorse =

Studio album by The Humpers
- Released: April 21, 1998
- Genre: Punk rock
- Label: Epitaph

The Humpers chronology
Plastique Valentine (1997)	Euphoria, Confusion, Anger, Remorse (1998)

Euphoria, Confusion, Anger, Remorse is the fifth and last studio album by punk rock band the Humpers, released in 1998.

== Track listing ==
1. "Steel-Toed Sneakers"
2. "Shortcut to Nowhere"
3. "Kaiser Bill"
4. "Fucking Secretaries"
5. "Devil's Magic Pants"
6. "Peggy Sue Got Buried"
7. "No You Don't"
8. "Ghetto in the Sky"
9. "Ten Inches Higher"
10. "No Escape"
11. "You Dirty Rat"
12. "Fistful of Zen"
