= Bad Motherfucken 40 O-Z =

Studio album by Red Aunts
- Released: 1994
- Genre: Punk rock
- Length: 23:39
- Label: Sympathy for the Record Industry

Red Aunts chronology
| Drag (1993) | Bad Motherfucken 40 O-Z (1994) | #1 Chicken (1995) |

Bad Motherfucken 40 O-Z is the second full-length album by the Red Aunts. It was released in 1994 by Sympathy for the Record Industry.

== Track listing ==
1. "Silver Moon Motel" – 2:21
2. "Batman A-Go-Go" – 2:05
3. "Terri Man" – 1:36
4. "Die Baby" – 1:53
5. "Wasted" – 1:04
6. "My Impala '65" – 3:08
7. "Brian Has A Car" – 1:52
8. "Baby Tough Luck" – 2:23
9. "Ice Tea" – 2:54
10. "Smoke" – 0:25
11. "Monsterfucker-Mothertrucker" – 3:58
