= Mr. Airplane Man =

Boston rock band

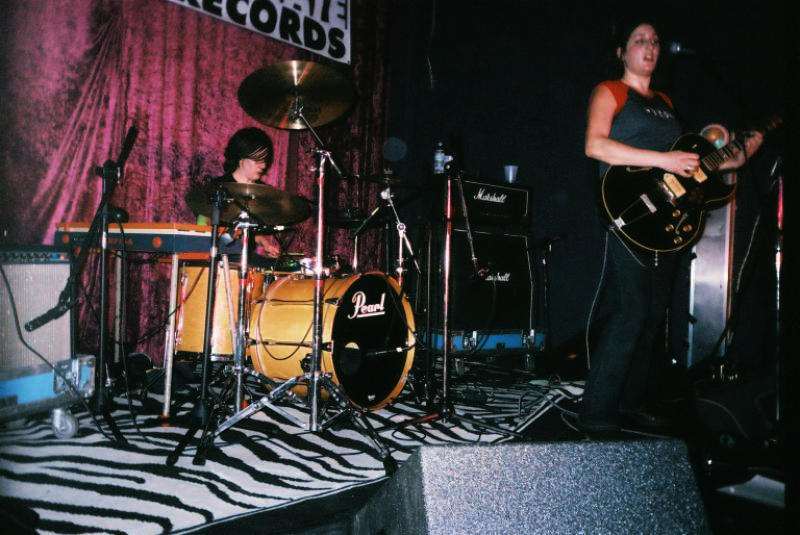
- Mr. Airplane Man performing in Los Angeles, 2003

Background information
- Origin: Boston, Massachusetts, U.S.
- Genres: Blues rock, rock and roll, garage punk, garage rock
- Years active: 1998—present
- Labels: Sympathy for the Record Industry, Moi J'Connais, Dirty Water Records
- Members: Margaret Garrett; Tara McManus
- Website: http://www.mrairplaneman.com/

Mr. Airplane Man is an American rock band from Boston, Massachusetts.

== Background and history ==
Margaret Garrett and Tara McManus met each other when they were both 10 years old. The two became childhood friends, but later separated, attending separate colleges. After beginning to play music together, the duo experimented with other band members, but preferred playing as a twosome. The band was formed under advice from Morphine frontman Mark Sandman.

== Career ==
Mr. Airplane Man released their first album Red Lite in 2001. The album drew comparisons to The White Stripes and Howlin' Wolf.

They released their second album in 2002 titled Moanin'. This was followed up with a third album in 2004 titled C'mon DJ.

The duo later were asked to open for Yeah Yeah Yeahs, The White Stripes and The Strokes. The duo released an EP in 2012 titled Shakin' Around.

After their third album, the duo went on hiatus, citing lack of inspiration. After being asked to play a festival in Germany, the pair decided to reunite.

The duo eventually released The Lost Tapes in December 2014, a collection of unreleased recordings from 1999 and a self-titled full length album originally recorded with Mark Sandman in 1998.

In 2016, the band relocated to Los Angeles to pursue musical work in the film and television industry. Their music has appeared in episodes of The L Word and the film Crazy Eyes, amongst others.

Mr. Airplane Man released Jacaranda Blue in 2018.

== Discography ==
=== Previously unreleased ===
- 1998: Mr. Airplane Man
- 1999: The Lost Tapes (Released 2014)

=== LPs ===
- 2001: Red Lite
- 2002: Moanin'
- 2004: C'Mon DJ
- 2018: Jacaranda Blue

=== EPs ===
- 2012: Shakin' Around
