= Saltbox (album) =

Studio album by Red Aunts
- Released: 1996
- Genre: Punk rock
- Label: Epitaph

Red Aunts chronology
#1 Chicken (1995)	Saltbox (1996)	Ghetto Blaster (1998)

Saltbox is the fourth full-length album by the Red Aunts. It was released in 1996 on Epitaph.

== Track listing ==
1. "Whatever" – 1:37
2. "I Can't Do Anything Right" – 0:52
3. "Paco" – 1:25
4. "All Red Inside" – 1:31
5. "Suerte" – 1:25
6. "Eldritch Sauce" – 2:27
7. "Fake Modern" – 1:42
8. "Handsome Devil" – 1:51
9. "The Snake" – 2:07
10. "Ruby (What I Won't)" – 1:25
11. "$5" – 1:05
12. "Palm Tree Swing" – 2:18
13. "Bullet Train" – 1:16
14. "Goin' Downtown" – 2:43
