= Plastique Valentine =

Studio album by Humpers
- Released: February 11, 1997
- Recorded: 1996/1997
- Genre: Punk
- Label: Epitaph Records
- Producer: Sally Browder

Humpers chronology
| Live Forever Or Die Trying (1996) | Plastique Valentine (1997) | Euphoria, Confusion, Anger, Remorse (1998) |

Professional ratings
Review scores
| Source | Rating |
|---|---|
| AllMusic | 3/5 stars |

Plastique Valentine is the fourth studio album by punk rock band the Humpers, released in 1997.

== Critical reception ==
CMJ New Music Monthly thought that the album "displays a band eye-ball deep in punk tradition that's so thoroughly absorbed its influences that comparisons and parallels are moot." Miami New Times determined that the new songs "swagger with more assurance and confidence than the frantic older stuff." The Bradenton Herald called the album "hot trailer trash punk flavored with searing '50s roadhouse piano."

AllMusic wrote that "though the songwriting is a bit limited—it's hard to find a hook anywhere on the record—its gut-wrenching, visceral rush is harder and more punk than most of the Humpers punk-revivalist contemporaries."

== Track listing ==
1. "Plastique Valentine"
2. "For Lovers Only"
3. "Anemia"
4. "Mutate with Me"
5. "Fable of Luv"
6. "Make Up"
7. "Sick of Tomorrow Today"
8. "Here Comes Nothing"
9. "With a Whip"
10. "Dummy Got a Hunch"
11. "Chump Change"
12. "Say Goodbye"
13. "Mongrel Train"
