= Number One Chicken =

Studio album by Red Aunts
- Released: 1995
- Genre: Punk rock
- Label: Epitaph Records
- Producer: Brett Gurewitz

Red Aunts chronology
Bad Motherfucken 40 O-Z (1994)	Number One Chicken (1995)	Saltbox (1996)

Professional ratings
Review scores
Source	Rating
AllMusic	4.5/5 stars
Robert Christgau	(dud)

#1 Chicken is the third full-length album by the Red Aunts. It was released in 1995 on Epitaph.

== Production ==
#1 Chicken was produced by Brett Gurewitz. The band claims that Snoop Doggy Dogg cowrote the album's seventh track, "Rollerderby Queen." The album contains 14 songs on a 23-minute album.

== Critical reception ==
Trouser Press wrote that the album "leaves no doubt that these Aunts can bite with a vengeance, but they’d be even more potent with a little less squawking." SF Weekly wrote: "In an era when punk is traded like a commodity and female artists like P J Harvey vamp for MTV's Vaseline-smeared cameras, Red Aunts march in, raid your fridge, vaporize your damage deposit, and leave you for dead in a heap on the floor, eardrums hissing and a smile on your face." The Spokesman-Review called the album Epitaph's "most snotty, brash, blistering and raw effort in some time."

== Track listing ==
1. "Freakathon"
2. "Tin Foil Fish Bowl"
3. "Hate"
4. "Detroit Valentine"
5. "Krush"
6. "Satan"
7. "Rollerderby Queen"
8. "Willabell"
9. "When Sugar Turns to Shit"
10. "Poker Party"
11. "Peppermint Patty"
12. "Mota"
13. "Number One Chicken"
14. "Netty"
