= Red Aunts =

American all-female punk band

- Origin: Los Angeles, California, United States
- Genres: Punk rock; garage rock; garage punk; riot grrrl
- Years active: 1992–1998
- Labels: Epitaph Records; Sympathy for the Record Industry
- Members: Terri Wahl; Kerry Davis; Debi Martini (died 2019); Lesley Noelle

The Red Aunts were an American all-female punk band that formed in 1991 in Long Beach, California, United States, when Terri Wahl (a.k.a. Angel, or Louise Lee Outlaw) recruited friends Kerry Davis (a.k.a. Sapphire, or Taffy Davis) and Debi Martini (a.k.a. E.Z. Wider, a.k.a. Connie Champagne, or Debbi Dip). Wahl would become the guitarist, sharing vocal duties with Davis who also played rhythm guitar and Martini as bassist. Wahl's ex-husband, Jon Wahl of the band Claw Hammer, stood in as drummer under the alias Joan Whale until he was replaced full-time by Lesley Ishino (a.k.a. Lesley Noelle, Ishino Destroyer, or Cougar).

None of the women had formal musical training or previous experience in bands. They received slight help from both Scott Drake of fellow Long Beach band the Humpers, and Jon Wahl. Dip put out the punk fanzine, Real Life in a Big City. The Red Aunts rapidly developed their own sound, going from raw simple punk to more complicated garage-punk-blues within the space of their seven years and five full-length albums. They disbanded in 1998. Singer Terri Wahl opened a catering company and 5 years later her own restaurant/bakery in Los Angeles. Other members have gone on to work with other bands like The Screws, Beehive and the Barracudas and others. Singer and guitarist Kerry Smith currently records under the name Two Tears.

== Discography ==
=== Albums ===
- Drag (1993, Sympathy for the Record Industry)
- Bad Motherfucken 40 O-Z (often misread as "Bad Motherfucker 40 O-Z") (1994, Sympathy for the Record Industry)
- #1 Chicken (1995, Epitaph Records)
- Saltbox (1996, Epitaph Records)
- Ghetto Blaster (1998, Epitaph Records)

=== Singles ===
- "The Red Aunts" (1992, Hell Yeah Records)
- "Retard Jenny" (1993, Sympathy for the Record Industry)
- "Paco 5" (1995, Sympathy for the Record Industry)

=== Split singles ===
- Red Aunts/Claw Hammer split (1993, Gearhead Records)
- Red Aunts/Gas Huffer split (1994, Sympathy for the Record Industry)
- Red Aunts/Constant Comment split (199?, Sympathy for the Record Industry)
