= Ragged Soul =

Studio album by Lazy Cowgirls
- Released: 1995
- Studio: Earl's Cow Palace
- Genre: Punk rock
- Label: Crypt
- Producers: Lazy Cowgirls, Earle Mankey

Lazy Cowgirls chronology
How It Looks—How It Is (1990)	Ragged Soul (1995)	A Little Sex and Death (1997)

Ragged Soul is an album by the American band Lazy Cowgirls, released in 1995. It was the band's first full studio album in five years.

The band supported the album by touring with Cosmic Psychos.

== Production ==
The album was produced by the band and Earle Mankey. Longtime members Pat Todd and Doug Phillips were joined by Leonard Keringer, Ed Huerta, and Michael Leigh.

== Critical reception ==
Professional ratings
Review scores
Source	Rating
AllMusic	4.5/5 stars
Chicago Tribune	3.5/4 stars

Trouser Press deemed Ragged Soul the band's masterpiece, writing that "this wonderful blast boasts cleaner, more dynamic sound without sacrificing any of the rough'n'ready urgency." The Chicago Reader thought that "their amped-up take on rock’s traditional bluster combines Pat Todd’s consistently soulful singing with a muscular, corn-fed instrumental assault and melodies that get lodged in your head without losing any power." The Columbus Dispatch declared that "Ragged Soul is a thrilling, sweaty, aggressive, pretty (yes, pretty) collection of 14 songs that will remind you of the best of the Ramones, Graham Parker and the Rolling Stones without even a hint of nostalgia."

The Chicago Tribune determined that, "while the sort of music heard on Ragged Soul has been done countless times before, this middle-aged, all-male quintet understands that it's not so much what is played, but how." The Wisconsin State Journal noted that "the album's lead track, 'I Can't Be Satisfied', sums up its 13 punk-rock successors nicely: It's urgent, speedy, bloody, explosive and hungry—yet strangely accessible, in a primal sort of way." The Daily Herald concluded that "the music is as uncompromising as ever, though vocalist Pat Todd's thoughtful lyrics adds additional appeal beyond your standard moshpit music."

AllMusic wrote: "Tough, furious, loud and proud—Ragged Soul is roots-smart old-school punk at its finest." Alternative Press included the album on its 2021 list of the 15 best punk albums of 1995.

== Track listing ==
No.	Title	Length
1.	"I Can't Be Satisfied"
2.	"Much Too Slow"
3.	"Frustration, Tragedy & Lies"
4.	"Who You Callin' a Slut?"
5.	"Everything You Heard About Me Is True"
6.	"Never Got the Chance"
7.	"Too Much—One More Time"
8.	"Time & Money"
9.	"Another Long Goodbye"
10.	"Now That You're Down on Me"
11.	"I Can Almost Remember"
12.	"Still on the Losin' Side (A.K.A. Snake Eyes)"
13.	"Take It as It Comes"
14.	"Bought Your Lies"
