= Calvin J. Spann =

United States Air Force general (1924–2015)

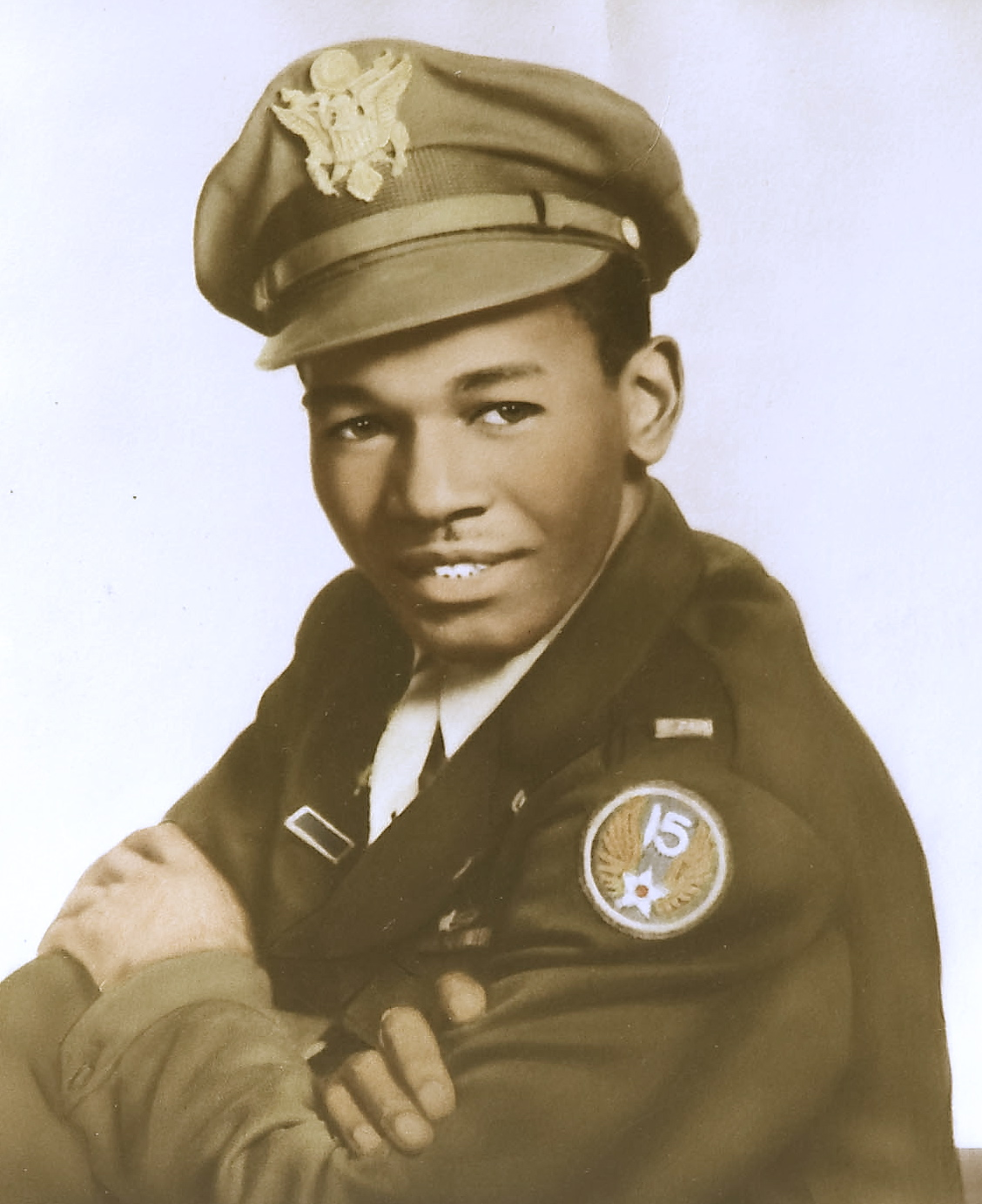
- 1st Lt. Calvin J. Spann, an original Tuskegee Airman of the 332nd Fighter Group 100th Squadron
- Born: November 28, 1924; Rutherford, New Jersey, U.S.
- Died: September 6, 2015 (aged 90); Texas, U.S.

Calvin J. Spann (November 28, 1924 – September 6, 2015) was one of the original Tuskegee Airmen, a fighter pilot with the 100th Fighter Squadron of the 332nd Fighter Group. Spann received his wings from the Tuskegee Flight School as a part of graduating class 44G. As a member of the United States Army Air Corps, he served in Europe during World War II, where Spann flew 26 combat missions before the end of the war in the European Theater.

== Education ==
He attended Rutherford High School.

== Military career ==
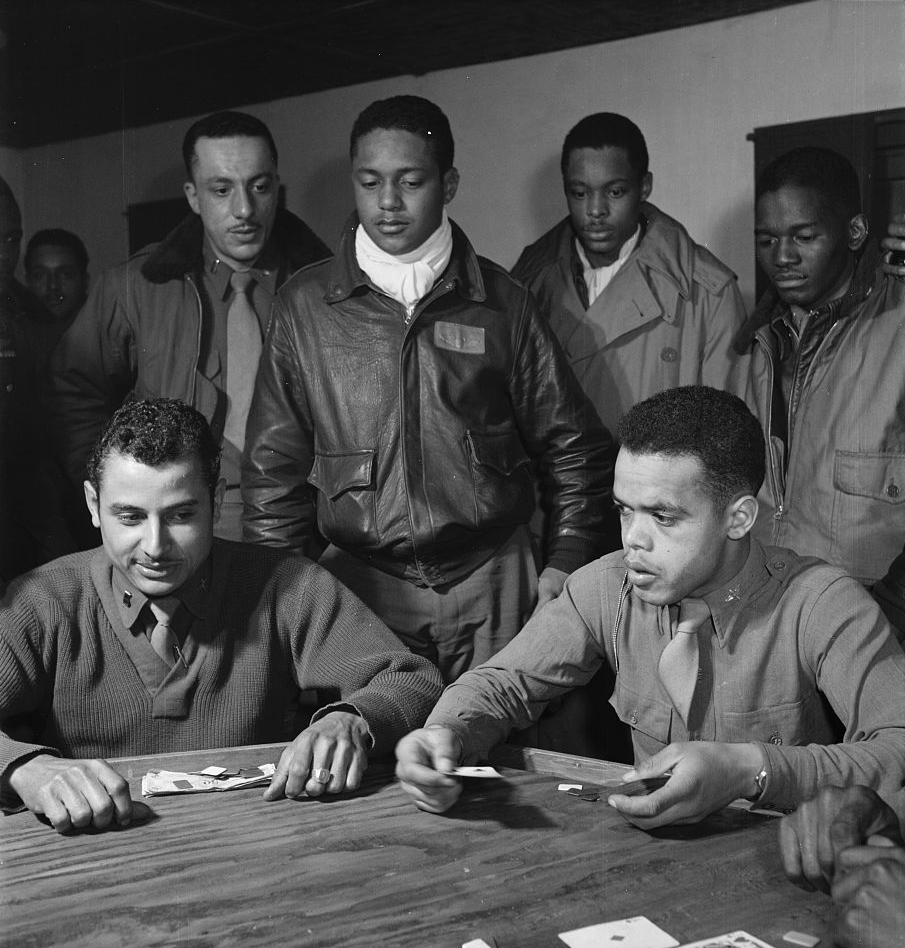
Spann (standing at right) watches fellow Tuskegee Airmen playing cards in the officers club in the evening while stationed in Italy (March 1945)

During Spann's wartime service (1944–1946), he was assigned to the 332nd Fighter Group under the command of Colonel Benjamin O. Davis Jr., who on September 2, 1941, was the first African American officer to solo an aircraft under the U.S. Army Air Corps. Davis would later rise to the rank of general in the United States Air Force. While assigned to the 332nd, he flew in the longest bomber escort mission of 15th Air Force, a 1600-mile round trip mission on March 24, 1945, from Ramitelli, Italy, to Berlin, Germany, to destroy a Daimler-Benz manufacturing facility under the leadership of squadron commander Captain Roscoe Brown.

== Later life ==
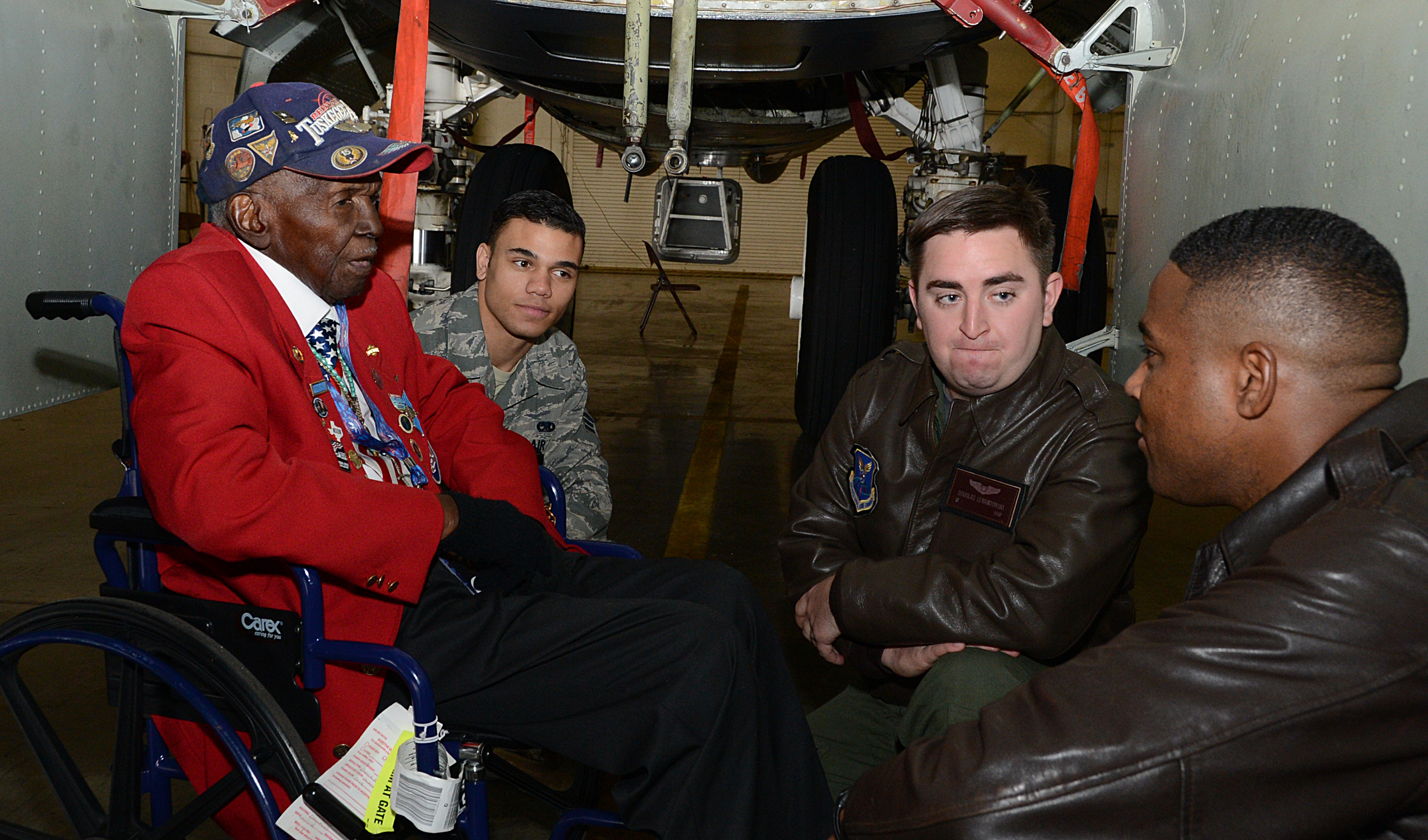
Spann speaks with members of the 11th Bomb Squadron at Barksdale Air Force Base as they sit inside the bomb bay of a Boeing B-52 Stratofortress (December 2014)

Later in his life, Spann spoke at schools, churches and organizations about the Tuskegee Airmen experience and how their courage and valor helped them to triumph. During these speeches, he encouraged students to make a commitment to excel in the study of mathematics and science, and reminding them that through preparation and perseverance they can succeed.

Spann lived in Englewood, New Jersey, and worked in the pharmaceutical industry. Spann died on September 6, 2015, at the age of 90 in McKinney, Texas, where he had moved in 2006 to be close to his daughter, Carla Spann and his grandchildren Carson and Cameron. He is buried in East Ridgelawn Cemetery in Clifton, New Jersey.

== Military awards ==
- The Air Medal with Oak Leaf Cluster
- A Presidential Unit Citation
- The European/African/Middle Eastern Campaign Ribbon
- The American Campaign Ribbon
- The World War II Victory Medal
- The Congressional Gold Medal (Tuskegee Airmen)

== See also ==
- Dogfights (TV series)
- Executive Order 9981
- Freeman Field Mutiny
- List of Tuskegee Airmen
- Military history of African Americans
- The Tuskegee Airmen (movie)
