= Two Tears =

American garage rock band

The Two Tears/Kerry Davis
- Also known as: Kerry Davis
- Origin: Los Angeles, California, United States
- Genres: Punk rock, Garage rock
- Years active: 2004–Present
- Labels: Kind Turkey Records; Windian Records; Simple Social Graces; Bent Rail Foundation; Art rocker Profet Records
- Members: Kerry Davis
- Website: http://www.twotears.com/

The Two Tears are an American garage rock band formed by Kerry Davis previously of the all-girl punk group Red Aunts. She also played drums in the Mick Collins fronted The Screws (In The Red Records). She also played in the short lived San Diego band Beehive and the Barracudas who released records on Swami Records. Two Tears was originally conceived as a one woman band. Eventually the project included a live drummer. She has lived and recorded music in Los Angeles, Dubai, Paris, and New York City (where she currently lives). She spent much of 2011 touring the US and Europe with Dan Sartain.

== Discography ==
Albums:

- Two Tears S/T (2005, Bent Rail Foundation)
- Little Tea (2007, Simple Social Graces)

Singles:

- "Les Deux Larmes" 7" (2004, Profet Records)
- "Wiggle Like A Worm" 7" (2004, Artrocker Records)
- "I'm So Outta It, I Can't Get Into It" (2009, Windian Records)
- "Eat People" 7" (2011, Kind Turkey Records)
