= Claw Hammer =

American indie rock band

- Origin: Long Beach, California
- Genres: Indie rock, punk blues, noise rock
- Years active: 1986–2000 (one-off reunion: 2013)
- Labels: Sympathy for the Record Industry; Epitaph Records; Interscope Records
- Past members: Jon Wahl; Chris Bagarozzi; Rob Walther; Rick Sortwell; Bob Lee

Claw Hammer was an American indie rock band from California. Claw Hammer formed in 1986 in Long Beach, California; its members were from several neighboring municipalities. Their name was taken from a Captain Beefheart song. The group released a cassette and some small-issue EPs and singles before signing to Sympathy for the Record Industry, who released their debut LP, an eponymous effort, in 1990. In 1991 they did an album entirely covering Devo's 1978 Are We Not Men? We Are Devo!. The group signed to Epitaph Records for their 1993 release, Pablum. In 1994, Claw Hammer performed as the backing band on Wayne Kramer's Epitaph release, The Hard Stuff. Jumping to major label Interscope, they released two more LPs, the last being 1997's Hold Your Tongue (and Say Apple). The group played live until 2000.

A reunion show was held on September 13, 2013, at The Echo in Echo Park, Los Angeles.

== Personnel ==
- Jon Wahl – guitar, vocals
- Chris Bagarozzi – guitar
- Rob Walther – bass (1987–2000)
- Dave Valdez – bass (1986–1987)
- Sean Edwards – drums (1986–1987)
- Rick Sortwell – drums (1987–1991)
- Bob Lee – drums (1991–2000)

== Discography ==
=== Albums ===
- Get Yer Za Za Yout (cassette) (Trigon Records, 1990)
- Claw Hammer (Sympathy for the Record Industry, 1990)
- Double Pack Whack Attack EP (Sympathy for the Record Industry, 1990)
- Q: Are We Not Men? A: We Are Not Devo (Sympathy for the Record Industry, 1991)
- Ramwhale (Sympathy for the Record Industry, 1991)
- Pablum (Epitaph Records, 1993)
- Thank the Holder Uppers (Interscope Records, 1995)
- 'Scuse the Excursion (Sympathy for the Record Industry, 1996)
- Hold Your Tongue (and Say Apple) (Interscope Records, 1997)
- Deep in the Heart of Nowhere (live double vinyl LP) (Munster Records, 2009)

=== Others ===
- Bullet in my Head / Self Destruct (2 songs on 12-inch compilation "Gimme the Keys) (Trigon Records, 1988)
- Poor Robert (3 song 7-inch EP) (Grown Up Wrong Records, 1988)
- Sick Fish Belly Up (7-inch single) (Trigon Records, 1989)
- Brother Brick Says (7-inch single) (Trigon Records, 1990)
- Malthusian Blues (7-inch single) (Sympathy for the Record Industry, 1993)

== Videography ==
- William Tell
- Hollow Legs
- Queen's Lead Helmet (1997)
- EPK (released by Interscope)
