= Sympathy for the Record Industry =

American record label

- Founded: 1988
- Founder: Long Gone John
- Genre: Punk, garage rock, indie rock, noise rock
- Country of origin: United States
- Official website: sympathyrecords.com

Sympathy for the Record Industry (also known as Sympathy Records or Sympathy 4 the R.I.) is a mainly independent garage rock and punk label formed in 1988 by John Mermis, known as Long Gone John. Notable artists who started on Sympathy and went on to gain mainstream success include The White Stripes, Hole, and The Electrocutes (the first Donnas incarnation).

== History ==
Long Gone John is the owner and CEO. He is an avid record collector with more than 10,100 records in his collection. He also owns Necessaries Toy Foundation, a company that creates 18-24 inch figures. Long Gone John also operates Sympathetic Press, a book publishing company that prints books with rock and roll themes.

The first Sympathy release was the Lazy Cowgirls' Radio Cowgirl LP, which Long Gone John said he released as a "favor to the band." Sympathy has a catalog of more than 750 releases. The label's name is a play on the song "Sympathy for the Devil" by The Rolling Stones, changing the subject of its title from the devil to the music industry.

The roster has included Jack Off Jill, Scarling, Miss Derringer, The Muffs, Mumps, The (International) Noise Conspiracy, The Von Bondies, Rocket from the Crypt, Billy Childish, Turbonegro, April March, Splatterheads, The Dwarves, Suicide, The Gun Club, Inger Lorre and Motel Shootout, Man or Astro-man?, The Red Planet Rocketts, Kim Salmon, Bored!, The Waldos, The Mystreated, and Redd Kross.

On July 20, 2007, Long Gone John announced via his Myspace Blog that he was selling the label for "$625,000.00 or $700,000.00 if I don't like you."

In September 2011, John decided to start releasing records once again. He signed a distribution deal with Independent Label Distribution, then immediately put out a full-length LP as well as three 7-inches by The Ettes. The company now distributes new records as well as many older ones from John's catalog.

As of 2023, the label's website has been updated with a notice that states "Hope to get the rest off the catalog up and available soon…". Sympathy has continued to add releases in the early 2020s.

== Discography ==
Cat. #	Artist	Title	Format	Other information
SFTRI 001	Lazy Cowgirls	Radio Cowgirl	LP	live at KCSB, Santa Barbara
SFTRI 001	Lazy Cowgirls	Radio Cowgirl + Bonus CD	CD	live at KCSB, Santa Barbara
SFTRI 002	Jeff Dahl Group	Vomit Wet Kiss	LP	
SFTRI 003	The Twenty Second Sect	Get That Charge	MLP	
SFTRI 005	Crowbar Salvation	Kiss The Brain	MLP	
SFTRI 006	Lazy Cowgirls	Beyond The Valley Of Jeff Dahl Featuring The Lazy Cowgirls	7-inch	
SFTRI 007	Sav X	Sav X	7-inch	etched by Savage Pencil & Long Gone John (Flies Among The Maggots)
SFTRI 008	Loafin' Hyenas	Scatter	7-inch	
SFTRI 009	T. Tex Edwards	Smitty	7-inch	
SFTRI 010	Powertrip	Sonic Reducer	7-inch	
SFTRI 011	Bored	Little Suzie	7-inch	
SFTRI 012	The Lizard Train	Motorcycle of Love	7-inch	
SFTRI 013	Crawlspace	August	7-inch	
SFTRI 014	The U.V.'s	Dropping Bombs	7-inch	
SFTRI 015	Kris Guido And The Mogodons	Warm	7-inch	
SFTRI 016	Jeff Dahl & Cheetah Chrome	Still Wanna Die	7-inch	
SFTRI 017	Clawhammer	Candle Opera	7-inch	
SFTRI 018	Satan's Sadists	She's My Witch	7-inch	
SFTRI 019	The Creamers	Love, Honor & Obey	LP	
SFTRI 020	The Child Molesters	So Fucked Up	2×7″	
SFTRI 021	The Tommyknockers	Snake Lighting	7-inch	
SFTRI 022	Pigmy Love Circus	I'm The King Of L.A. ... I Killed Axl Rose Today	7-inch	
SFTRI 023	The Mystery Band	Tasting The Smell Of Life	7-inch	cover art by Savage Pencil
SFTRI 024	Crowbar Salvation	Sack Lunch	7-inch	
SFTRI 025	Lazy Cowgirls	The Long Goodbye	7-inch	
SFTRI 026	Slub	Comic Stellar	7-inch	
SFTRI 027	God	Rockin' Marky	7-inch	
SFTRI 028	The Twenty Second Sect	UXB	7-inch	
SFTRI 029	Sacred Miracle Cave	Heavy Black Noise	7-inch	
SFTRI 030	Contrapunctus	Two Legs	7-inch	
SFTRI 031	Vinyl Gang Bang	Vinyl Gang Bang	7-inch	
SFTRI 032	Trash Can School	Horses	7-inch	
SFTRI 033	The Pooh Sticks	Teenage High	7-inch	
SFTRI 034	Garage Monsters	Powerhouse	7-inch	
SFTRI 035	Haunted Garage	Brain In A Jar	2×7″	
SFTRI 036	Loafin' Hyenas	Scratchin' Fleas	7-inch	
SFTRI 037	Clawhammer	Claw Hammer	LP/CD	
SFTRI 038	Unholy Montage	Unholy Montage	7-inch	artwork by Savage Pencil
SFTRI 039	Lazy Cowgirls	How It Is, How It Looks	LP	
SFTRI 039	Lazy Cowgirls	How It Is, How It Looks + Third Times The Charm-Again	CD	
SFTRI 040	Ron Urini	Wild Venus On Wheels	7-inch	credited to "Ron Urini & Mars Bonfire"
SFTRI 041	The Philisteins	Some Kind	7-inch	
SFTRI 042	Mad Daddys	Cat Scratch Fever!	7-inch	
SFTRI 043	T. Tex Edwards	Pardon Me I've Got Someone To Kill	LP	
SFTRI 044	The American Ruse	I Don't Wanna	7-inch	
SFTRI 045	Sav X	Little Record That Wished It Could	2×7″	No music recorded. Two picture discs illustrated by Savage Pencil.
SFTRI 046	La Secta	Don't Follow That Way	7-inch	
SFTRI 047	Al Perry & The Cattle	It's Your Grave	7-inch	
SFTRI 048	The Lovedolls	Rock In The Sea	7-inch	
SFTRI 049	Barracudas	Next Time Around	7-inch	
SFTRI 050	Cordell Jackson	Rockin' Rollin' Eyes	7-inch	
SFTRI 051	Satan's Sadists	Black Dahlia	2×7″	
SFTRI 052	Chemical Dolls	Gimme Some Head	7-inch	
SFTRI 053	Hole	Retard Girl	7-inch/CDEP	
SFTRI 054	Crawlspace	Solitude	7-inch	
SFTRI 055	T. Tex Edwards	Lee Harvey	7-inch	
SFTRI 056	Miracle Workers	Way Back When	7-inch	
SFTRI 057	Clawhammer	Blank Frank = Double Pac Whack Attack	2×7″	
SFTRI 058	The Pooh Sticks	Formula One Generation	LP	
SFTRI 059	Splatterheads	"Destroyer"	7-inch	
SFTRI 060	Slub	Burning Immigrant	7-inch	
SFTRI 061	Sacred Miracle Cave	Salvation	7-inch	
SFTRI 062	Tav Falco & His Panther Burns	Surfside Date	7-inch	
SFTRI 063	Johnny Legend	House Of Frankenstein	7-inch	
SFTRI 064	The Sunflowers	Teenage Death	7-inch	
SFTRI 065	Smegma	Swampdick	7-inch	
SFTRI 066	Coneheads	Happiest Day Of Her Life	7-inch	
SFTRI 067	Devil Dogs	Get On Your Knees	7-inch	
SFTRI 068	Turbonegro	Route Zero	7-inch	
SFTRI 069	Ron Urini	Metal Thunder	LP	
SFTRI 070	Two Saints	Lost At Sea	7-inch	
SFTRI 071	Tav Falco & His Panther Burns	I Can Help	7-inch	credited to "The Tav & Gabby Show"
SFTRI 072	Trash Can School	Baby Lust	7-inch	
SFTRI 073	Spiderbaby	Turn On Me	7-inch	
SFTRI 074	Gargoyles	Running Down	7-inch	
SFTRI 075	Sonic Boom	Drone Dream	7-inch	
SFTRI 076	The Pooh Sticks	Emergency	7-inch	
SFTRI 077	Immaculate Hearts	Sugar Pussy	7-inch	Inner 7-inch sticker with devil girl illustration by Coop.
SFTRI 078	Kim Salmon	Lightning Scary	7-inch	
SFTRI 079	The American Ruse	Another Girl, Another Planet	7-inch	
SFTRI 080	Sludge	Suicide Drive	7-inch	
SFTRI 081	Melvins	With Yo' Heart, Not Yo' Hands	7-inch	
SFTRI 082	Steel Pole Bath Tub	Voodoo Chile/Arizona Garbage Truck	7-inch	
SFTRI 083	The Crazies	Self Destruct	7-inch	
SFTRI 084	The Humpers	Baby '89	7-inch	
SFTRI 085	Barbed Wire Dolls	Demoralize	7-inch	
SFTRI 086	American Soul Spiders	Spanish Doll	7-inch	
SFTRI 087	White Flag & Tony Adolescent	Young Girls	7-inch	
SFTRI 088	Mooseheart Faith	Bluevolution Pt. 1	7-inch	
SFTRI 089	Jonestown	Twenty Five Years	7-inch	
SFTRI 090	Squeezed Brains	Another Day	7-inch	
SFTRI 091	Contrapunctus	Burning	7-inch	
SFTRI 092	The Pleasure Fuckers	Get Away	7-inch	
SFTRI 093	Lazy Cowgirls	Teenage Frankenstein	7-inch	
SFTRI 094	Metal Mike	Wig Wam Bam	7-inch	
SFTRI 095	Krüppelschlag	Paralyzed	7-inch	
SFTRI 096	Satin Chickens	Satin Chickens	2×7″	
SFTRI 097	Cheater Slicks	You Don't Satisfy	7-inch	
SFTRI 098	Anal Babes	Fear And Loathing With The Anal Babes	7-inch	
SFTRI 099	The Cynics	Buick Mackane	7-inch	
SFTRI 100	The Creamers	Bob Kringle	7-inch	
SFTRI 101	Monsieur Jeffrey Evans & La Fong	Music From Binghampton	7-inch	
SFTRI 102	The Sect	The Beast	7-inch	
SFTRI 103	Gargoyles	Michigan	7-inch	
SFTRI 104	Cry	Lightyears	7-inch	
SFTRI 105	Loudspeaker	Pray	7-inch	
SFTRI 106	Snailboy	Spoo Heaven	7-inch	
SFTRI 107	Calamity Jane	My Spit	7-inch	
SFTRI 108	Tesco Vee	Crime Pays The Bills	7-inch	
SFTRI 109	Red Planet Rockets	Tick Tock	7-inch	
SFTRI 110	Mummies	Vs. Wolfmen	2×7″	The cover is a comic book illustrated by Coop.
SFTRI 111	El Vez	En El Barrio	7-inch	
SFTRI 112	Sacred Miracle Cave	Melt Like Butter	2×7″	
SFTRI 113	Supersuckers	Saddle Tramp	7-inch	
SFTRI 114	Atomic 61	Rip	7-inch	
SFTRI 115/Sweet VA 001	The Pooh Sticks	Who Loves You	7-inch	
SFTRI 116	Olivelawn	Beautiful Feeling	7-inch	
SFTRI 117	Rube Ruben	Shmendrick	7-inch	cover art by Daniel Clowes
SFTRI 118	Crawlspace	Spherality	CD	
SFTRI 119	Clawhammer	We Are Not Devo	LP/CD	
SFTRI 120	Clawhammer	Ram Whale	LP/CD	
SFTRI 121	The Muffs	New Love	7-inch	
SFTRI 122	Lazy Cowgirls	There's A New Girl In Town	2×7″	
SFTRI 123	The Pooh Sticks	The Great White Wonder	CD	
SFTRI 124	Prisonshake	Someone Else's Car	7-inch	
SFTRI 125	Honeymoon Killers	Vanna White	7-inch	
SFTRI 126	Antiseen	It Looks Good For Them To Care	7-inch	
SFTRI 127	The Daggers	Kiss That Girl	7-inch	
SFTRI 128	La Secta	Our Kicks	2×7″	
SFTRI 129	Teenage Larvae	I'm So Lonesome I Could Cry	7-inch	
SFTRI 130	God Bullies	How Low Can You Go?	7-inch	
SFTRI 131	Penetration Moon	5th A Day	7-inch	
SFTRI 132	The Dwarves	I Wanna Kill Your Boyfriend	7-inch	
SFTRI 133	The Electric Ferrets	Arnold Ziffel	7-inch	
SFTRI 134	Garage Monsters	Safari To Mumbooba	10-inch	
SFTRI 135	Chrome Cranks	Way-out Lover	7-inch	
SFTRI 136	Lithium X-Mas	Live From A Dive	7-inch	
SFTRI 137	American Soul Spiders	Lazy Cowgirls	7-inch	
SFTRI 138	Thee Headcoats	Hatred, Ridicule & Contempt	7-inch	
SFTRI 139	Iowa Beef Experience	Jubilix	7-inch	
SFTRI 140	Gargoyles	Without End	CD	
SFTRI 141	Meanies	Scum	7-inch	
SFTRI 142	Spoon	Trash	7-inch	
SFTRI 143	Turbonegro	Vaya Con Satan	7-inch	
SFTRI 144	Pink Slip Daddy	Junkyard	7-inch	
SFTRI 145	Slot	Grandma	7-inch	
SFTRI 146	Tri-State Kill Spree	Bathtub Meth	7-inch	
SFTRI 147	Trash Can School	Sick Jokes & Wet Dreams	CD	
SFTRI 148	Rancid Vat	Portland Blood Bath	7-inch	
SFTRI 149	The Pooh Sticks	Crazy Love	7-inch	
SFTRI 150	Basil Wolverton	Wolvertunes	7-inch	3-D cover art
SFTRI 151	Thee Headcoatees	We Got Seven Inches But We Wanted Twelve	7-inch	
SFTRI 152	Roky Erickson	You Don't Love Me Yet	7-inch	
SFTRI 153	Slug	Breath The Thing Out/Breakneck/Go Tell	7-inch	
SFTRI 154	Blackflies	Wake Up Stupid	7-inch	
SFTRI 155	Sleez Sisters	Sick On You	7-inch	
SFTRI 156	Bad Vugum	2×7″		
SFTRI 157	Big Chief	Strange Notes	7-inch	etched
SFTRI 158	Bad Religion	Atomic Garden	7-inch	etched b-side reproducing the cover art by The Pizz
SFTRI 159	Screaming Bloody Marys	Devil Rock	7-inch	
SFTRI 160	El Vez	Maria's The Name	7-inch	
SFTRI 161	The Pooh Sticks/Gila Monster split	7-inch		
SFTRI 162	Gibson Bros.	White Nigger	7-inch	
SFTRI 163	Empty Set	Down On The Street	7-inch	
SFTRI 164	Mono Men	Took That Thing	7-inch	
SFTRI 165	Devil Dogs	F*T*W*	7-inch	
SFTRI 166	The Zeros	I Don't Wanna	7-inch	
SFTRI 167	Midnight Men	Mean Mutha Fuckin Man	7-inch	
SFTRI 168	The Phantom Surfers	Unknown Museum Stomp	7-inch	cover art by Coop
SFTRI 169	Smegma	Thicket	7-inch	
SFTRI 170	Woofer	In Sequins	7-inch	cover art by Savage Pencil
SFTRI 171	Gas Huffer	Mole	7-inch	
SFTRI 172	Girl Trouble	Girl Trouble Plays Elvis Movie Themes	2×7″	
SFTRI 173	Ethyl Meatplow	Whore	7-inch	
SFTRI 175	Bassholes	John Henry	7-inch	
SFTRI 174	Dangerhouse	Box Set	7-inch Box Set	(as yet Unreleased)
SFTRI 175	Bassholes	John Henry	7-inch	
SFTRI 176	Gibson Bros.	Memphis Sol Today!	LP	SFTRI/TAR:
SFTRI 176	Gibson Bros.	Memphis Sol Today!	LP/CD	Special fanclub edition
SFTRI 177	Overwhelming Colorfast	It's Tomorrow	7-inch	
SFTRI 178	Thee Headcoats	Have Love Will Travel	7-inch	
SFTRI 179	Rocket From The Crypt	Boychucker	7-inch	
SFTRI 180	The Friggs	Shake	7-inch	
SFTRI 181	Wild Billy Childish And The Deltamen	Troubled Times	2×7″	
SFTRI 182	Roky Erickson	Beauty & The Beast	CD	
SFTRI 183	27 Devils Joking	Love Vibration	CD	
SFTRI 184	Satan's Cheerleaders	Rollercoaster	7-inch	cover art by Coop
SFTRI 185	fluf	Time Over	7-inch	
SFTRI 186	Pink Slip Daddy	Rock Action	CD	
SFTRI 187	Jackknife	San Francisco Beauty Queen	2×7″	
SFTRI 188	Spectrum	True Love Will Find You In The End	2×7″	
SFTRI 189	The Nomads	Primordial Ooze	7-inch	
SFTRI 190	The Vacant Lot	Neighborhood Girls	7-inch	
SFTRI 191	Kozik/Sonic Boom	split 7-inch	cover art by Kozik	
SFTRI 192	Blunder Tongue	Long Tall Willie	7-inch	
SFTRI 193	The Shitbirds	Oh Joy!	10-inch	
SFTRI 194	Lubricated Goat	Shut Your Mind	7-inch	
SFTRI 195	The Darlin's	Take Me Danci	7-inch	
SFTRI 196	Mummies	(You Must Fight To Live) On The Planet Of The Apes	7-inch	
SFTRI 197	White Flag	Don't Give It Away	7-inch	
SFTRI 198	Atomic 61	White Christmas - Blue Christmas	7-inch	Special X-Mas Edition
SFTRI 199	El Vez	How Great Thou Art	CD	
SFTRI 200	Their Sympathetic Majesties Request	A Decade Of Obscurity And Obsolescence 1988 - 1998	2×LP	Cover art by Mark Ryden
SFTRI 200	Their Sympathetic Majesties Request	A Decade Of Obscurity And Obsolescence 1988 - 1998	2×CD	Cover art by Mark Ryden
SFTRI 201	Roky Erickson	Hasn't Anyone Told You	7-inch	
SFTRI 202	Skullflower	Evel Knievel	7-inch	
SFTRI 203	Teenage Larvae	Songs For Pigs	10-inch	
SFTRI 204	Ford	Vicodin	7-inch	
SFTRI 205	Pontiac Brothers	Big Black River	CD	
SFTRI 206	Mad Daddys	Fifty Dollar Baby	CD	
SFTRI 207	Red Aunts	Retard Jenny	7-inch	picture disc
SFTRI 208	Doc Wör Mirran	Ugloids	7-inch	
SFTRI 209	Super Sympathy Spectrum Stocking Stuffer		7-inch	
SFTRI 210	Slug	Hambone City/King of Ghosts	7-inch	
SFTRI 211	The Spacemen 3	Dream Weapon	CD	
SFTRI 212	Workdogs	In Hell	CD	
SFTRI 213	Jet Boys	Get Out My Girl	7-inch	picture disc
SFTRI 214	Sacred Hearts	Bottle Of Whiskey	7-inch	
SFTRI 215	'68 Comeback	Memphis	7-inch	
SFTRI 216	The Humpers	Positively Sick On Forth Street	LP/CD	
SFTRI 217	Los Falanas	Nakema	7-inch	
SFTRI 218	Loudspeaker	Knockout	7-inch	
SFTRI 219	Lazy Cowgirls	Another Long Goodbye	10-inch	
SFTRI 220	A-Bones	Don't Need No Job	7-inch	
SFTRI 221	Thee Headcoats	Tubs Twist	7-inch	
SFTRI 222	Billy Childish With The Blackhands	Black Girl	7-inch	
SFTRI 223	High Technology Suicide	Paint It Black Sabbath	7-inch	
SFTRI 224	White Flag	White Rabbit	7-inch	
SFTRI 225	San Diego Compilation		(Unreleased)	
SFTRI 226	Wreckless Eric	Joe Meek	7-inch	
SFTRI 227	Jackknife	Drugstar '69	LP/CD	
SFTRI 228	New Bomb Turks	Trying To Get By	7-inch	
SFTRI 229	Clawhammer	Malthusian Blues	7-inch	
SFTRI 230	Wreckless Eric	Donovan Of Trash	CD	
SFTRI 231	Devil Dogs	Saturday Night Fever	CD	
SFTRI 232	Bad Religion	American Jesus	7-inch	Cover art by Coop.
SFTRI 233	Bloodloss	In-A-Gadda-Da-Change	CD	
SFTRI 234	El Vez	Fun In Espanol	CD	
SFTRI 235	Ramleh	8 Ball Corner Pocket	7-inch	
SFTRI 236	The Psychotic Turnbuckles	Crazy Times	7-inch	
SFTRI 237	Red Aunts	Drag	CD	
SFTRI 238	The Muffs	Big Mouth	7-inch	
SFTRI 239	The Tards	I'm Just Like You	8"	
SFTRI 240	Trash Can School	Volume War	LP/CD	
SFTRI 241	Radio Wendy	Bad Assteriod	10-inch	
SFTRI 242	The Child Molesters	Brown Album	LP/CD	
SFTRI 243	Fur	Sex Drive	7-inch	
SFTRI 244	The Mystreated	There's No Escape	7-inch	
SFTRI 245	Phenobarbidols	Beyond The Valley Of The Phenobarbidols	10-inch	
SFTRI 246	The Junkyard Dogs	Good Livin' Platter	10-inch	
SFTRI 247	The Junkyard Dogs	Good Livin' Platter	7-inch	picture disc
SFTRI 248	Workdogs	Roberta	CD	
SFTRI 249	Chris Wilson	Darkhaired Girl	7-inch	
SFTRI 250	Man Or Astroman?	Postphonic Star Exploration	5"	
SFTRI 251	The Makers	Hip-Notic	10-inch	
SFTRI 252	Oiler	Little Holes	7-inch	
SFTRI 253-1	Jack O'Fire	Soul Music 101 Chapter 1	7-inch	
SFTRI 253-2	Jack O'Fire	Soul Music 101 Chapter 2	7-inch	
SFTRI 253-3	Jack O'Fire	Soul Music 101 Chapter 3	7-inch	
SFTRI 254	Turbonegro	Grunge Whore	10-inch	
SFTRI 255	Trumans Water	Skyjacker	7-inch	
SFTRI 256	Free Kitten	Oh Bondage Up Yours!	7-inch	picture disc
SFTRI 257	Teengenerate, Savage!!! = Let's Go To The Top		10-inch	
SFTRI 257	Teengenerate, Savage!!! = Let's Go To The Top		MCD	
SFTRI 258	'68 Comeback	Paper Boy Blues	10-inch	
SFTRI 259	Hand Over Head	Evil Guru	7-inch	picture disc
SFTRI 260	Redd Kross	2500 Fans Can't Be Wrong	10-inch	
SFTRI 261	The Gun Club	Cry To Me	7-inch	
SFTRI 262	Lunachicks	Shit Finger Dick	7-inch	
SFTRI 263	Oiler	Missing Part One	CD	
SFTRI 264	The Psyclone Rangers	Swing, Baby, Swing	7-inch	cover art by Kozik
SFTRI 265	Billy Childish	Book/CD		
SFTRI 266	Southern Culture On The Skids Southern Culture On The Skids	10-inch/CDEP		
SFTRI 267	Thee Headcoats	I'm A Confused Man	7-inch	
SFTRI 268	GG Allin & the Murder Junkies	Kill Thy Father, Rape Thy Mother	7-inch	
SFTRI 269	The Waldos	Rent Party	CD	
SFTRI 270	Los Falanas	Cockroach Blues	7-inch	
SFTRI 271	Happy Birthday	Baby Jesus	10-inch	
SFTRI 272	The Friggs	America's Only Rock 'N' Roll Magazine Parody	EP 10-inch	
SFTRI 273	Ringling Sisters	Cherries In The Snow	7-inch	
SFTRI 274	Deadbeats	Live 1978	CD	
SFTRI 275	Skullflower	Ponyland	7-inch	
SFTRI 276	Dead Moon	Ricochet	7-inch	
SFTRI 277 '68	Comeback	Mr. Downchild	LP/CD	
SFTRI 278	Spectrum	California Lullabye	10-inch	
SFTRI 279	E.A.R.	Mesmerised	LP/CD	
SFTRI 280	The Dwarves	That's Rock'n'Roll	7-inch	
SFTRI 281	DGeneration	Wasted Years	7-inch	
SFTRI 282	The Humpers	Journey To The Center Of Your Wallet	CD	
SFTRI 283	Red Aunts	Bad Motherfucker 40 O-Z	LP/CD	
SFTRI 284	Blag Dahlia	Let's Take A Ride	7-inch	
SFTRI 285	Loudspeaker	Rubberneckers Vs. Tailgaters	CD	
SFTRI 286	Armitage Shanks	Dutch Courage	7-inch	
SFTRI 287	Je & Ill With Joe Coleman	Je & Ill With Joe Coleman	7-inch	cover art by Joe Coleman
SFTRI 288	Doo Rag	7-inch	(Unreleased)	
SFTRI 289	Supernova	Electric Man	7-inch	
SFTRI 290	Diesel Queens	Wanderer	7-inch	
SFTRI 291	Black Randy	Pass The Dust	CD	
SFTRI 292	'68	Comeback	Tobacco Road Part 1	7-inch
SFTRI 293	E.A.R.	Pocket Symphony	5"	
SFTRI 294	Gas Huffer/Red Aunts	split 7-inch	picture disc	
SFTRI 295	Adolescent Music Fantasy	A Thousand Pounds Of Talent	7-inch	
SFTRI 296	The Child Molesters	Surfing With The Child Molesters	7-inch	
SFTRI 297	Baby Lemonade	The Wonderful	10-inch	
SFTRI 298	Lollipop	Write Me A Poem	7-inch	
SFTRI 299	Jackknife	All My Blues For Sale	7-inch	
SFTRI 300	Their Sympathetic Majesties Request	Volume 2	2×LP/2×CD	Cover art by Mark Ryden
SFTRI 301	Workdogs	Old	CD	
SFTRI 302	El Vez	Graciasland	CD	
SFTRI 303	If It Ain't The Snow (Bad Vugum Comp Vol. 2)		2×7″	
SFTRI 304	Oblivians	Oblivians	10-inch	
SFTRI 305	The Nomads	Powertrip	LP	
SFTRI 306	Karen Black	The Voluptuous Horror Of Karen Black	7-inch	picture disc
SFTRI 307	E.A.R.	Sub Agua	8"	picture disc, artwork by Anthony Ausgang
SFTRI 308	Satan's Cheerleaders	Infinity	CD	
SFTRI 309	The Leather Uppers	Cut Off Vest	7-inch	
SFTRI 310	Devil Dogs	No Requests Tonight	LP/CD	
SFTRI 311	The Shitbirds	Faster And Shorter	5"	
SFTRI 312	The Shitbirds/Simon & The Bar Sinisters	split 7-inch		
SFTRI 314	Geraldine Fibbers	Get Thee Gone	10-inch	
SFTRI 315	El Vez	Cinco De Mayo	7-inch	
SFTRI 316	Acid King	Blasting Cap	10-inch	
SFTRI 317	Earl Lee Grace	Earl Lee Grace	CD	
SFTRI 318	Kings Of Rock/The Makers	split 7-inch		
SFTRI 319	New Bomb Turks	(Gotta Gotta) Sinking Feeling	7-inch	picture disc
SFTRI 320	Rocket From The Crypt	The State Of Art Is On Fire	10-inch	
SFTRI 320	Rocket From The Crypt	The State Of Art Is On Fire	CDEP	
SFTRI 321	'68 Comeback	Golden Rogues Collection	CD	
SFTRI 322	Jackknife	Real Folk Blues (For The Broke Generation)	10-inch	
SFTRI 323	Tanner	Purma Pac	7-inch	
SFTRI 324	Workdogs	A Tribute To Sonny Boy Williamson	7-inch	
SFTRI 325	Skullflower	Transformer	CD	
SFTRI 326	Bad Religion	Stranger Than Fiction	7-inch	cover art by The Pizz
SFTRI 327	Ether Hogg	Ether Hogg	CD	
SFTRI 328	Los Falanas	Tantrum	7-inch	
SFTRI 329	Magnitude 3/The Makers		split 7-inch	
SFTRI 330	Boyd Rice/Rose McDowell		split 7-inch	picture disc
SFTRI 331	The Vikings	Rock All	7-inch	
SFTRI 332	Thee Headcoatees	I'm Happy	7-inch	
SFTRI 333	The Nomads	Showdown! (1981–1993)	2×CD	
SFTRI 334	Jack O'Fire	Soul Music 101, chapter 4	10-inch	
SFTRI 335	Thee Headcoats	Louie Louie	7-inch	
SFTRI 336	Bloodloss	Ten Solid Rockin' Inches of Rock Solid Rock	10-inch	
SFTRI 337	Ramleh	Dicey Opera = Night Hair Child	7-inch	
SFTRI 338	The Sore Losers Soundtrack		2×LP/CD	
SFTRI 339	The Del Lagunas	Exotic	7-inch	
SFTRI 340	The Looney Tunes	Cool Surfin'	CD	
SFTRI 341	The Mystreated	Don't Do That	7-inch	
SFTRI 342	The Tards	Pissed You In The River	7-inch	
SFTRI 343	Chris D.	Love Cannot Die	CD	
SFTRI 344	The Humpers	Contractual Obligation	10-inch	
SFTRI 344	The Humpers	Contractual Obligation	CD	
SFTRI 345	Roky Erickson with Evil Hook	Roky Erickson With Evil Hook	CD	
SFTRI 346	April March	Chick Habit	2×7″	
SFTRI 347	Trick Babys	Last Chance Man	7-inch	
SFTRI 348	Phenobarbidols	Fish Lounge	CD	
SFTRI 349	Happy Birthday	Baby Jesus: The Second Coming	10-inch	
SFTRI 350	El Vez	Mex-Mas	CD	
SFTRI 351	The Humpers	Fast, Fucked And Furious	7-inch	
SFTRI 352	The Neptunas	Surfatorium	7-inch	
SFTRI 353	Guaranteed Ugly	The Ugly Ones	7-inch	
SFTRI 354	Candy 500	Loretta Hogg	10-inch	
SFTRI 355	Monster Truck Five	Vandal-X	7-inch	
SFTRI 356	Los Straitjackets	Gatecrasher	7-inch	
SFTRI 357	International Language	Where The Bands Are	7-inch	
SFTRI 358	The Quadrajets	Let's Go To Outer Space	7-inch	
SFTRI 359	The Pleasure Fuckers	Ripped To The Tits	CD	
SFTRI 360	Los Falanas	Hell Blues	7-inch	
SFTRI 361	Motel Shootout	Burn	7-inch	
SFTRI 362	The Quadrajets	Burden	LP+7"/CD	
SFTRI 363	Starpower	Orbital Sander	LP/CD	
SFTRI 364	The Cowslingers	Truck Drivin'	10-inch/CD	
SFTRI 365	The Nephews	This World	CD	
SFTRI 366	Diesel Queens	Hooked On Moronics	CD	
SFTRI 367	Monster Truck Five	Columbus Ohio	CD	
SFTRI 368	The Spacemen 3	For All The Fucked Up ...	LP/CD	
SFTRI 369	Honeymoon Killers	Sing Sing (1984–1994)	2×CD	
SFTRI 370	Haves	Coal Black	7-inch	
SFTRI 371	The 5.6.7.8's	Bomb the Twist	10-inch/CDEP	
SFTRI 372	Compulsive Gamblers	Gamblin' Days are Over	CD	
SFTRI 373	Rocket from the Crypt	Plays the Music Machine	5"	
SFTRI 373	Rocket From The Crypt	Plays The Music Machine	7-inch	
SFTRI 374	The Stump Wizards	Waxy Yellow Build Up	CD	
SFTRI 375	El Vez	Like A Hole In The Head	10-inch	picture disc
SFTRI 376	The Neptunas	Ask Any Mermoid	7-inch	
SFTRI 377	Ramleh	Be Careful	CD	
SFTRI 378	The Chubbies	I'm The King	7-inch	
SFTRI 379	Acid King	Zoroaster	CD	
SFTRI 380	Los Primos	Twistin' Con Los Primos	7-inch	
SFTRI 381	Emma Peel	Play Emma For Me	CD	
SFTRI 382	The Chubbies	I'm The King	CD	
SFTRI 383	Oblivians	Six Of The Best	10-inch	
SFTRI 384	Geraldine Fibbers	Dragon Lady	7-inch	
SFTRI 385	Turbonegro	Ass Cobra	CD	
SFTRI 386	Joey & Korla Pandit	Blast Off	7-inch	
SFTRI 387	Korla Pandit	Exotica 2000	CD	
SFTRI 388	The Neptunas	Scratch And Surf	CD	
SFTRI 389	Campus Tramps	Stay Dumb	CD	
SFTRI 390	'68 Comeback	Someday My Prince Will Come ....	2×7″	
SFTRI 391	Satan's Cheerleaders	Paint It Black	CD	
SFTRI 392	Supernova	Monsta!11	5"	
SFTRI 393	The Quadrajets	Queen Of The Twist	7-inch	
SFTRI 394	The Makers	Shout On	2×7″	
SFTRI 395	The Cougars	10 Curiously Strong Songs	CD	
SFTRI 396	Happy Birthday	Baby Jesus Vol. 1&2	CD	
SFTRI 397	Red Aunts	Paco	5"	
SFTRI 398	April March	Chick Habit	CDEP	
SFTRI 399	Loudspeaker	Lit	7-inch	
SFTRI 400	Sympathetic Majesties Request:	Volume 3	CD	(As Yet Unreleased)
SFTRI 401	Emma Peel	Lava Lamp	7-inch	
SFTRI 402 Johnny Tu-Note & The Scopitones	I'll Do Ya Right	7-inch		
SFTRI 403	The Wildebeests	Just Like Me ..	7-inch	
SFTRI 405	Jack O'Fire	Forever	CD	
SFTRI 406	Oblivians	The Sympathy Sessions	CD	
SFTRI 407	Stinkies	Boogie '72	7-inch	
SFTRI 408	The Trip	Help Me	7-inch	
SFTRI 409	Lord High Fixers	Group Improvisation	10-inch	
SFTRI 409	Lord High Fixers	Group Improvisation ... That's Music!	CD	
SFTRI 410				(Unreleased)
SFTRI 411	Baby Lemonade	68% Pure Imagination	CD	
SFTRI 412	Oblivians	Kick Your Ass	7-inch	
SFTRI 413				(Unreleased)
SFTRI 414	The Quadrajets	I Wanna Do Everything To You	5"	
SFTRI 415	The Chubbies	Can I Call You Daddy (When We Make Love)	7-inch	
SFTRI 416	Thee Mighty Caesars	You Are Forgiven	7-inch	
SFTRI 417				(Unreleased)
SFTRI 418				(Unreleased)
SFTRI 419	Big Foot Chester	Harpoon Man	7-inch	
SFTRI 420	Big Foot Chester	Devil In Me	CD	
SFTRI 421	The Shitbirds	Famous Recording Artists	CD	
SFTRI 422	'68 Comeback	A Bridge Too Fuckin' Far	2×LP/CD	
SFTRI 423	The Dirtbombs	High Octane Salvation	7-inch	
SFTRI 424	The Vikings	Go Berserk!	CD	
SFTRI 425	Wesley Willis/The Frogs	split 7-inch	7-inch	
SFTRI 426	Servotron	Meet Your Mechanical Masters	7-inch	cover art by SHAG
SFTRI 427	The Quadrajets	Alabama Hip Shake	LP/CD	
SFTRI 428	Supernova	Our Lips Are Sealed	7-inch	
SFTRI 429	Pussy Crush	Punk Friction	7-inch	
SFTRI 430	Pussy Crush	Zero For Sweet Talk	CD	
SFTRI 431	Dark Carnival	The Last Great Ride	LP/CD	cover art by Niagara
SFTRI 432	(Unreleased)			
SFTRI 433	Deadbeats	On Parade	CD	
SFTRI 434	April March & The Makers	April March Sings The Songs	LP/CD	
SFTRI 435	Stinkies	Fun To Put Together	CD	
SFTRI 436	Daredevils	Hate You	7-inch	
SFTRI 437	Suicide Kings	Teenage Disaster	LP/CD	
SFTRI 438	Monster Truck Five	Dry Leaves ... Hot Wire	CD	
SFTRI 439	The Spaceshits	Fullfisted Action	2×7″	
SFTRI 440	The Chubbies	Play Me	CDEP	
SFTRI 441	Los Cincos	Kissing At The Carnival	7-inch	
SFTRI 442	Los Cincos	The Five Deadly Sins	LP/CD	
SFTRI 443	Ultrasonic Attack Wave	Pestrepeller	CD	
SFTRI 444	Destroy All Monsters	Silver Wedding Anniversary	CD	
SFTRI 445	Stool Pigeons	I Gotta Dream On	7-inch	
SFTRI 446	Stool Pigeons	Rule Hermania	CD	
SFTRI 447	Clawhammer	Scuse The Excursion	CD	
SFTRI 448	Satan's Cheerleaders	Electraglide	CD	cover art by Anthony Ausgang
SFTRI 449	Billy Childish	Made With A Passion, Kitchen Demo's	LP/CD	
SFTRI 450	'68 Comeback	The Annex Sessions, Volume One	7-inch	
SFTRI 451	'68 Comeback	The Annex Sessions, Volume Two	7-inch	
SFTRI 452	El Vez with The Memphis Mariachis & The Lovely Elvettes	Twentieth Century Boy	5"	
SFTRI 453	El Vez	A Lad From Spain	10-inch	
SFTRI 454	Speed Queens	Speed Queens	CD	
SFTRI 455	The 5.6.7.8's	Bomb the Twist	7-inch	
SFTRI 456	April March	Paris In April	LP/CD	
SFTRI 457	International Language	International Language	CD	
SFTRI 458	Guaranteed Ugly	Guaranteed Ugly	LP/CD	
SFTRI 459	E.A.R.	Phenomena 256	2×LP/CD	
SFTRI 460	Tav Falco & His Panther Burns	FZ 4500 ? Disappearing Angels	10-inch/CD	
SFTRI 461	The Wildebeests	Punk	7-inch	
SFTRI 462	The Wildebeests	Instrumental Hits	7-inch	
SFTRI 463	Thee Headcoatees	Punk Girls	LP/CD	
SFTRI 464	The Muffs	I'm A Dick	7-inch	
SFTRI 465	Lazy Cowgirls	Route 66 shaped disc		
SFTRI 466	The Pleasure Fuckers	Sexy French Motherfucker	2×7″	
SFTRI 467	Destroy All Monsters	Paranoid Of Blondes	7-inch	
SFTRI 468	Speed Queens	Motormouth	7-inch	
SFTRI 469	Stool Pigeons	Popsicles and Icicles	7-inch	
SFTRI 470	The Makers	Hip-Notic/Shout On!!	CD	
SFTRI 471	Holly Golightly	Won't Go Out	2×7″	
SFTRI 472	The Chubbies	Tres Flores	LP/CD	
SFTRI 473				(Unreleased)
SFTRI 474	Holly Golightly	Painted On	LP/CD	
SFTRI 475	Jack Oblivian	American Slang	12-inchEP/CD	
SFTRI 476	Rodney & The Tube Tops	I Hate The 90's	7-inch	
SFTRI 477	Tav Falco & His Panther Burns	FZ 2000 1st EP	7-inch	
SFTRI 478	The Gun Club	Early Warning/Six String Sermon	2×CD	
SFTRI 479	Bottle Of Smoke	A Wrench In The Monkey Works	CD	
SFTRI 480	The Chubbies	Didjahaftasaythat?	7-inch	
SFTRI 481	Geraldine Fibbers	What Part Of "Get Thee"	CD	
SFTRI 482	Kill The Moonlight	The Motion Soundtrack	CD	
SFTRI 483	The Eyeliners	Broke My Heart	7-inch	
SFTRI 485	Thee Headcoatees	Ça Plane Pour Moi	7-inch	
SFTRI 486	The Wildebeests	Go Wilde In The Countrye	CD/LP	
SFTRI 487	The Spaceshits	By My Side	7-inch	
SFTRI 488	The Spaceshits	Winter Dance Party	LP/CD	
SFTRI 489				(Unreleased)
SFTRI 490	The Humpers	Plastique Valentine	7-inch	
SFTRI 491	April March & Los Cincos	April March & Los Cincos	LP/CD	
SFTRI 492	Los Cincos	Experimental	CD	
SFTRI 493	Spectrum	What Came Before	CD	
SFTRI 494	R.L. Burnside	Georgia Women	7-inch	
SFTRI 495	Constant Comment/Red Aunts		split 7-inch	
SFTRI 496	The Cowslingers	Spine Snapper	7-inch	
SFTRI 497	Desperate Teenage Lovedolls Soundtrack	Original Motion Picture Soundtrack	CD	
SFTRI 498	The Pebbles	First Album	CD	
SFTRI 499	Beachbuggy	Track Record 160	7-inch	
SFTRI 500	Sympathetic Majesties Request Volume 4		CD	(As yet Unreleased)
SFTRI 501	Stool Pigeons	I'm The One	7-inch	
SFTRI 502	Stool Pigeons	Gerry Cross The Mersey	CD	
SFTRI 503	Mad 3	Machineblaster	7-inch	
SFTRI 504	Chrome Cranks	Dyin' Style	7-inch	
SFTRI 505	The Chubbies	I Love My Label	7-inch promo	cover art by Mark Ryden
SFTRI 506	Holly Golightly	Up The Empire (Live)	LP/CD	
SFTRI 507	Geraldine Fibbers	Butch	2×LP	
SFTRI 508	The Neckbones	Hit Me!	7-inch	
SFTRI 509	The Pleasure Fuckers	Fuck Deluxe	10-inch/CDEP	
SFTRI 510	The Neptunas	Nautipuss	7-inch	
SFTRI 511				(Unreleased)
SFTRI 512	The Revelators	The Revelators Featuring Walter Daniels	7-inch	
SFTRI 513	Greg Oblivian & The Tip Tops	Head Shop	LP/CD	
SFTRI 514	Bassholes	Bassholes Featuring April March	7-inch	
SFTRI 515	The Grown Ups	Ode To The B-Dog	7-inch	
SFTRI 516	The Grown Ups	Milk Carton	CD	
SFTRI 517	The Banana Erectors	Teenage 3K Worker	7-inch	
SFTRI 518	The Eyeliners	Eyeliner	7-inch	
SFTRI 519	Euro Boys	Jet Age	CD	
SFTRI 520	Big Foot Chester	Tabernaclin'	CD	
SFTRI 521	The Embrooks	The Embrooks	7-inch	
SFTRI 522	Godzik Pink	Nursery Lime	7-inch	
SFTRI 523	Euro Boys	Mr. Wild Guitar	7-inch	
SFTRI 524	Royal Pendletons	Sore Loser	7-inch	
SFTRI 525	Detroit Cobras	Mink Rat Or Rabbit	LP/CD	
SFTRI 526/cat.no.?	Elmore Williams	For The Love Of Jesus - Chapter One	7-inch	
SFTRI 527/cat.no.?	T-Model Ford	For The Love Of Jesus - Chapter Two	7-inch	
SFTRI 528/cat.no.?	Frank Roach	For The Love Of Jesus - Chapter Three	7-inch	
SFTRI 529	Billy Childish & Dan Melchior	Devil In The Flesh	LP/CD	
SFTRI 530	The Masonics	Down Among The Dead Men	LP/CD	
SFTRI 531	Speedball Baby	I'm Gonna Stomp Mr. Harry Lee	10-inch	
SFTRI 532	Royal Pendletons	Oh Yeay, Baby: An Intimate Session With America's Favorite Band	LP/CD	
SFTRI 533	New Bomb Turks	Snap Decision	7-inch	
SFTRI 534	Greg Oblivian & The Tip Tops	Pretty Baby	7-inch	
SFTRI 535	Jack Oblivian	So Low	LP/CD	
SFTRI 536	The Neptunas	Let Them Eat Tuna	CD	
SFTRI 537	Shine On	Sweet Starlet	LP/CD	
SFTRI 538	Lazy Cowgirls	Valentine's Day	CDEP	
SFTRI 539	Beachbuggy	Unsafe At Any Speed	CD	
SFTRI 540/cat.no.?	Cedell Davis	For The Love Of Jesus - Chapter Four	7-inch	
SFTRI 541/cat.no.?	Robert Cage	For The Love Of Jesus - Chapter Five	7-inch	
SFTRI 542/cat.no.?	Junior Kimbrough	For The Love Of Jesus - Chapter Six	7-inch	
SFTRI 543	Turbonegro	Get It On	7-inch	picture disc
SFTRI 544	Little Porkchop	Welcome To ... Little Porkchop	LP/CD	
SFTRI 545	Bob Log III	Daddy Log's Drive-In Candy Hoppin' Car Babes	7-inch	
SFTRI 546	The Chubbies	What Girls Want	7-inch	
SFTRI 547	Oddballs' Band	Hangdog Blues	7-inch	
SFTRI 548	Rocket from the Crypt	RFTC	LP	
SFTRI 549	The Revillos	Totally Alive	LP/CD	
SFTRI 550	The Deadly Snakes/The Spaceshits		split 7-inch	
SFTRI 551	Lo-Hi	... Kind Of Like A Feel Good Thing	LP/CD	
SFTRI 552	Thee Headcoats & His Famous Headcoats	Hendrix Was Not The Only Musician	LP	
SFTRI 553	Buck	Buck	LP/CD	
SFTRI 554	The Eyeliners	Rock N Roll, Baby	7-inch	
SFTRI 555	The Revillos	The Revillos	7-inch	
SFTRI 556	Mad 3	Teenage Delinquent	LP/CD	
SFTRI 557	Buck	American Express	7-inch	
SFTRI 558	Rocket From The Crypt	All Systems Go	CD	
SFTRI 559	Los Cincos	Circa 1995	2×7″/CDEP	
SFTRI 560	The Barbarellas	Queen Of The Galaxy	10-inch/CDEP	
SFTRI 561	Tav Falco & His Panther Burns	Souvenirs	2×LP/2×CD	
SFTRI 562	The Deadly Snakes	Love Undone	LP/CD	
SFTRI 563	The Chubbies	Your Favourite Everything	10-inch/CDEP	
SFTRI 564	The Spaceshits	Misbehavin'	LP/CD	
SFTRI 565	Turbonegro	Apocalypse Dudes	LP	
SFTRI 566	Electrocutes	Steal Yer Lunch Money	LP/CD	
SFTRI 567	Supersnazz	It's Alright	7-inch	
SFTRI 568	Supersnazz	Diode City	LP/CD	
SFTRI 569	The Banana Erectors	The Banana Erectors	LP/CD	
SFTRI 570	Compulsive Gamblers	Bluff City	LP/CD	
SFTRI 571	The Banana Erectors	Draggin' U.S.A.	7-inch	
SFTRI 572	Compulsive Gamblers	Crystal Gazing Luck Amazing	LP/CD	
SFTRI 573	Buck	Jerry Hall	7-inch	
SFTRI 574	'68 Comeback	Love Always Wins	LP/CD	
SFTRI 575	The Neptunas	Hollowgrinders Are Go	7-inch	
SFTRI 576		Alright, This Time, Just The Girls	2×LP/2×CD	cover art by Mark Ryden
SFTRI 577	The White Stripes	The White Stripes	LP/CD	
SFTRI 578	The White Stripes	The Big Three Killed My Baby	7-inch	
SFTRI 579	Dan Melchior's Broke Revue	This Love Is Real	CD	
SFTRI 580	Los Cincos	Syncopation Syncopation	LP/CD	
SFTRI 581	Impala	Teenage Tupelo Soundtrack	LP	
SFTRI 582	Billy Childish	Crimes Against Music	2×LP/CD	
SFTRI 583	Satan's Cheerleaders	Mancuso	CD	
SFTRI 584	Oblivians	Best Of The Worst 1993-97	2×LP/CD	
SFTRI 585	Buck	Taggy Lee's Wedding Song	7-inch	
SFTRI 586	Vegas Thunder	No One Fucks With Vegas Thunder	LP/CD	
SFTRI 587	Bassholes	The Secret Strength Of Depression	LP/CD	
SFTRI 588	Lazy Cowgirls	Rank Outsider	LP/CD	
SFTRI 589	The Muffs	Hamburger	2×LP/CD	
SFTRI 590	'68 Comeback & Oblivians	Melissa's Garage Revisited	LP/CD	
SFTRI 591	Holly Golightly & Dan Melchior	Desperate Little Town	LP/CD	
SFTRI 592	The Muffs	No Action	7-inch	
SFTRI 593	The Joneses	Criminal History	CD	
SFTRI 594	Vyvyan	Teenage Wannabes	10-inch/CD	
SFTRI 595	El Vez	Son Of A Lad From Spain	CD	
SFTRI 596	The Wildebeests	'Up Your Pipe With...' 7-inch		
SFTRI 597	The Short Fuses	Beneath The City Of The Guitar Vixens	7-inch	
SFTRI 598	The Short Fuses	Get The Hell Down	LP/CD	
SFTRI 599		How Many Bands Does It Take To Screw Up A Blondie Tribute?	2×LP/CD	
SFTRI 601	Buck	Christmas In My Heart	7-inch	
SWA 2002/SFTRI 602	Hot Snakes	Automatic Midnight	LP/CD	
SFTRI 603	The Kirby Grips	The Cherry Stem Concertos	LP/CD	
SFTRI 604	The Hard Feelings	Fought Back And Lost	LP/CD	
SFTRI 605	Lazy Cowgirls	Somewhere Down The Line	LP/CD	
SFTRI 606	The Chubbies	American Swagger	CD	
SFTRI 607	Les Sexareenos	Live! In The Bed	LP/CD	
SFTRI 608	The Come Ons	The Come Ons	LP/CD	
SFTRI 609	The White Stripes	De Stijl	LP/CD	
SFTRI 611	The Upholsterers	Makers Of High Grade Suites	7-inch	
SFTRI 613	The Vice Principals	After School With The Vice Principals	LP/CD	
SFTRI 614	Sir Bald Diddley & His Wig-Outs	To Baldly Go ...	LP/CD	
SFTRI 615	Supernova	Pop As A Weapon/More Songs About Hair	CD	
SFTRI 616	Candypants	Candypants	LP/CD	
SFTRI 617	The Come Ons	Whatcha Got?	7-inch	
SFTRI 618	Spectrum	Spectrum Variations	LP/CD	
SFTRI 619	The White Stripes	Hello Operator	7-inch	
SFTRI 619p	The White Stripes	Hello Operator	7-inch	picture disc
SFTRI 620	Me First	Sorry Hangover	LP/CD	
SFTRI 621	Tuuli	Rockstar Potential	10-inch/CDEP	
SFTRI 623		Sympathetic Sounds of Detroit	LP/CD	
SFTRI 625	The Banana Erectors	You Got That Uh Uh	7-inch	
SFTRI 626	Lisa Marr Experiment	4 AM	LP/CD	
SFTRI 627	The Wildebeests	The Wildebeests, She Lives In A Time Of Her Own	7-inch	
SFTRI 628	The Daylight Lovers	Lyle Sheraton And The Daylight Lovers	LP/CD	
SFTRI 629	The Secrets	Who's Walkin' Who	7-inch	
SFTRI 630	The Peeps	The Peeps	LP/CD	
SWA 2005/SFTRI 632	JC2000	JC2000	CD	
SWA 2006/SFTRI 633	The Sultans	Sultans	4 Track CDEP	
SWA 2007/SFTRI 634	The Sultans	Ghost Ship	LP/CD	
SFTRI 635	Detroit Cobras	Life, Love And Leaving	LP/CD	
SFTRI 636	Les Sexareenos	14 Frenzied Shakers	LP/CD	
SFTRI 637	The Peeps	I Like It	7-inch	
SFTRI 638	Micky & The Salty Seadogs	Salt Water And Whiskey	LP/CD	
SFTRI 639	Rizzo	Phoning It In	LP/CD	
SFTRI 642	The Black Halos/Tuuli		split 7-inch	
SFTRI 643	Tearjerkers	Bad Moon Rising	LP/CD	
SFTRI 644	The Buff Medways	Tribute To The Daggermen	CD	
SFTRI 645	The White Stripes	Lord, Send Me An Angel	7-inch	
SFTRI 646	The Crack Pipes	Every Night	Saturday Night	CD
SFTRI 647	Andy G. And The Roller Kings	Andy G. And The Roller Kings	10-inch/CD	
SFTRI 648	The Del-Gators	Pound Down!	LP/CD	
SFTRI 649	Mr. Airplane Man	Red Lite	LP/CD	
SFTRI 650	Monsieur Jeffrey Evans	I've Lived A Rich Life	LP/CD	
SFTRI 651	Bantam Rooster	Fuck All Y'All	LP/CD	
SFTRI 652	The Excessories	Pure Pop For Punk People	CD	
SFTRI 653	Les Sexareenos	Les Sexareenos	7-inch	
SFTRI 654	Reigning Sound	Break Up Break Down	LP/CD	
SFTRI 655	Mr Airplane Man	Johnny Johnny	7-inch	
SFTRI 656	Reigning Sound	Two Sides To Every Man	7-inch	
SFTRI 657	Ko And The Knockouts	Ko And The Knockouts	LP/CD	
SFTRI 658	The Von Bondies	Lack Of Communication	LP/CD	
SFTRI 659	The Stuck-Ups	The Stuck-Ups	LP/CD	
SFTRI 660	The White Stripes	White Blood Cells	LP/CD	(tour-edition vinyl)
SFTRI 661	Lazy Cowgirls	Here And Now (LIVE!)	LP/CD	
SFTRI 662P	The White Stripes	Dead Leaves And The Dirty Ground	CDS	(promo release)
SFTRI 663P	V/A	It Takes Two, Baby	7-inch promo	
SFTRI 664	The Buff Medways	Tribute To The Daggermen	7-inch	
SFTRI 665	The Beards	Funtown	CD	
SFTRI 666	Rocket From The Crypt	On The Prowl	7-inch	
SFTRI 667	The Von Bondies	It Came From Japan	7-inch	
SFTRI 668	Tina And The Total Babes	She's So Tuff	LP/CD	
SFTRI 669	The American Death Ray	Welcome To The Incredibly Strange And Erotic World Of The American Death Ray	CD	
SFTRI 670	The Come Ons	Hip Check!	LP/CD	
SFTRI 671	The Del-Gators	Mudpit	7-inch	
SWA 2009/SFTRI 673	Beehive & The Barracudas	Plastic Soul With The White Apes	CD	
SFTRI 675	The Scientists	Blood Red River 1982-1984	CD	
SFTRI 676	El Vez	Boxing With God	CD	
SFTRI 678	The Nomads	Up-Tight	CD	
SFTRI 680	The Lords Of Altamont	To Hell With The Lords Of Altamont	CD	
SFTRI 682	New York Dolls	From Paris With Love, L-U-V !!	CD	
SFTRI 685	Roky Erickson	The Evil One (Plus One)	2×CD	
SFTRI 686		The Sympathetic Sounds Of Montréal	CD	
SFTRI 688	The American Death Ray	Smash Radio Hits	CD	
SFTRI 689	The Cool Jerks	Cleaned A Lot Of Plates In Memphis	LP/CD	
SFTRI 690	Mr Airplane Man	Moanin'	LP/CD	
SFTRI 692	The Chubbies	New Wave Boyfriends	CD	
SFTRI 694	The Scientists	The Human Jukebox 1984 - 1986	CD	
SFTRI 695		The Sympathetic Sounds Of Toe-Rag Vol. 1	LP/CD	
SFTRI 696	The Kirby Grips	Rotations	CD	
SFTRI 698	Compulsive Gamblers	Live & Deadly-Memphis/Chicago	2×LP/CD	
SFTRI 699	Bad Times	Bad Times	CD	
SFTRI 701	South Filthy	You Can Name It Yo' Mammy If You Wanna ...	CD	
SFTRI 702	The Stuck-Ups	Human Doll Express	CD	
SFTRI 705	The Nomads	Showdown 2 - The 90's	CD	
SFTRI 706	Pearlene	Pearlene	CD	
SFTRI 708	The (International) Noise Conspiracy	Up For Sale	7-inch/CDS	
SFTRI 709	Red Kross	Neurotica	LP	
SFTRI 710	The Fondas	Way Down In The Motor City Underworld Coming Now!	LP/CD	
SFTRI 711	The Downbeat 5	The Downbeat 5	CD	
SFTRI 712	Dwarves	The Dwarves Must Die	LP/CD	
SFTRI 713		Root Damage (compilation)	2×LP	
SFTRI 713		Root Damage	2×CD	cover art by Clayton Brothers
SFTRI 716	Scarling.	Band Aid Covers The Bullet Hole	7-inch	The cover artwork is the painting "wound" by Mark Ryden
SFTRI 717	Cool Jerks	Live	never released	
SFTRI 718	Alright, This Time Just the Girls Vol. 2	various artists	2x 12-inchLP/CD	cover art by Camille Rose Garcia
SFTRI 719	Oblivians	Rock 'n Roll Holiday-Live in Atlanta	CD/LP (limited red vinyl)	
SFTRI 720	Down & Out with the Dolls	Soundtrack	7-inch	cancelled-never released
SFTRI 721	The Bloody Hollies	Fire At Will	LP/CD	
SFTRI 722	Mr Airplane Man	C'Mon DJ	LP/CD	
SFTRI 723	The Fondas	Wanna Be	7-inch	
SFTRI 724	Wanda Jackson	Heart Trouble	LP	
SFTRI 725	The Longer the Drool the Stranger the Brew, My Dear	Various Artists	LP/CD	never released
SFTRI 726	April March	Sometimes When I Stretch + 4	5 track 12-inch	
SFTRI 727	Mr Airplane Man	Shakin' Around	10-inch	
SFTRI 728	Candypants	The Happiest Time Of The Year	7-inch	
SFTRI 729	Suicide	Attempted: Live at Max's Kansas City 1980	CD	
SFTRI 730	Miss Derringer	King James, Crown Royal & A Colt 45	CD	cover art by Elizabeth McGrath
SFTRI 731	Scarling	Sweet Heart Dealer	CD/LP	cover art by Mark Ryden
SFTRI 732	Stan Ridgeway/Pietra Wextun	Blood	CD	cover art by Mark Ryden
SFTRI 733	Scientists	Pissed on Another Planet	double CD	
SFTRI 734	Holly Golightly	Down Gina's at 3	CD	
SFTRI 735	Tearjerkers	Don't Throw Your Love Away	LP/CD	
SFTRI 736	Reigning Sound	Home For Orphans	LP/CD	
SFTRI 737	The Dwarves	Salt Lake City, Go!, Kaotica	7-inch	
SFTRI 738	Scarling	Crispin Glover/Love Becomes a Ghost	7-inch	
SFTRI 739	Scarling	Crispin Glover/Art of Pretension	7-inch	
SFTRI 740	The Gun Club	Miami	LP/CD	
SFTRI 741	The Gun Club	Death Party	LP/CD	
SFTRI 742	The Gun Club	The Las Vegas Story	LP/CD	
SFTRI 743	The A-Lines	One Day	7-inch	
SFTRI 744	The A-Lines	You Can Touch	LP/CD	
SFTRI 745	Antoinette			18" Figure (not album) (first Necessaried Toy Foundation release)
SFTRI 746	The Gun Club	Walkin' With The Beast	7-inch	
SFTRI 747	Katastrophy Wife	All Kneel	CD/LP	Postponed indefinitely - never released
SFTRI 748	Katastrophy Wife	Liberty Belle/Butter	7-inch	Postponed indefinitely - never released
SFTRI 749	The Muffs	Really Really Happy	LP	
SFTRI 750	The Willowz	Are Coming	CD	
SFTRI 751	Helen Love	The Bubblegum Killers	EP/CD	
SFTRI 752	The Dwarves	The Dwarves Must Remix	12-inch EP	
SFTRI 753	The Willowz	Talk In Circles	LP	
SFTRI 753	The Willowz	Talk In Circles	CD	
SFTRI 754	Mumps	How I Saved the World	CD + DVD	
SFTRI 755	Scarling./The Willowz		split 7-inch	
SFTRI 746	Enid	High Fashion Glamour Doll		18" Figure (not album) (second Necessaried Toy Foundation release)
SFTRI 757	Matson Jones		CD/LP	
SFTRI 758	Scarling.	So Long Scarecrow	CD/LP	LP cover art by Mark Ryden
SFTRI 759	Mumps	Crocodile Tears/Waiting for the World to Catch Up	7-inch	
SFTRI 760	Matson Jones	A Little Bit of Arson Never Hurt Anyone/New York City Fuck Off	7-inch	
SFTRI 761	The Dwarves	Like You Want + Two Live Tracks	7-inch	
SFTRI 762	Danny and the Nightmares	Freak Brain	CD	
SFTRI 763	Eugene Kelly	Man Alive	CD	
SFTRI 764	Jeffrey Lee Pierce	Wildweed	CD	
SFTRI 765	The Gun Club	Mother Juno	CD	
SFTRI 766	Miss Derringer	Lullabies	CD	cover art by Elizabeth McGrath
SFTRI 767	Eugene Kelly	You're Having My Sex	7-inch	
SFTRI 768	...	...	...	
SFTRI 769	Matson Jones	The Albatross...	CD EP	
SFTRI 770	The Willowz	See in Squares	DVD	
SFTRI 771	Jack Off Jill	Clear Hearts Grey Flowers	LP	cover art by Mark Ryden
SFTRI 772	Jack Off Jill	Humid Teenage Mediocrity	CD	
SFTRI 773	Scarling.	"Staring to the Sun"	7-inch	
SFTRI 774	Detroit Cobras	Lost and Found	CD/LP	
SFTRI 775	The Fondas	Runaway Bombshell	LP/CD	
SFTRI 776	The Ettes	Dead And Gone	7-inch	
SFTRI 777	The Fondas	Make You Mine	7-inch	
SUCK 8	Jackknife	I Won't Be Home For Christmas	7-inch	co-release with Sympathy For The Record Industry (no cat. number for SFTRI)
SFTRI 778	Jack O & the Tennessee Tearjerkers	Flipside Kid	CD	
SFTRI 779	The Ettes	Shake the Dust	CD/LP	
SFTRI 780	Veruca Salt	IV	CD/LP	
SFTRI 781	The Ettes/The Fondas	From the Songbook of Greg Cartwright Promo	7-inch	

== See also ==
- List of record labels
- List of Sympathy for the Record Industry artists
