= Lazy Cowgirls =

Punk rock band from Los Angeles, California

- Origin: Los Angeles, California
- Genres: Punk rock
- Years active: 1983–2004
- Labels: Restless; Bomp!; Grown Up Wrong!; Sympathy for the Record Industry; Crypt
- Past members: Pat Todd; Doug Phillips; Allen Clark; Keith Telligman; Michael Leigh; Ed Huerta; Leonard Keringer; Bob Deagle; Eric Chandler; Roy J. Morgan

The Lazy Cowgirls were a Los Angeles-based punk rock band active from 1983 to 2004. They have been described as "punk rock legends" by Westword's Brad Jones. After they broke up, lead singer Pat Todd founded Pat Todd & the Rankoutsiders.

== History ==
The Lazy Cowgirls were formed in Los Angeles in 1983 by Pat Todd (vocals), Doug Phillips (aka D.D. Weekday) (guitar), Allen Clark (drums), and Keith Telligman (bass guitar), all of whom originally grew up together in Vincennes, Indiana. They started playing shows regularly in 1984. Their self-titled debut was released in 1985 on Restless Records, and was produced by Chris D. It was followed by Tapping the Source, which was released in 1987 on the Bomp! label. They then searched for a new label to release a live album, Radio Cowgirl, which led to the establishment of, and first release for the Sympathy for the Record Industry label.

Their third album, Radio Cowgirl, was released in 1989 as the first album on Sympathy for the Record Industry. The album contains recordings of one of the band's famously energetic live performances for KCSB-FM. An article in Spin that year described them as "one of the planet's ranking punk bands". Their fourth album, How It Looks -- How It Is, was released the following year, also on Sympathy for the Record Industry. In 1991, Telligman and Clark quit the band, and their rhythm section became highly variable for the next several years. By 1995, when the band released Ragged Soul, this seemed to have changed, with their lineup now consisting of Todd, Weekday, Michael Leigh (rhythm & lead guitar), Ed Huerta (drums), and Leonard Keringer (bass guitar). Ragged Soul was co-produced by Earle Mankey, and was described by Trouser Press as the band's "best shot at commercial success".

In 1996, Weekday, Leigh and Huerta left the band after the 95 Euro & US tours. When they released the album A Little Sex and Death in 1997, it featured Bob Deagle on drums and Eric Chandler on guitar. In February 1988, they released a four-song EP/CD, Broken Hearted On Valentines Day with Rick Johnson joining the band (rhythm guitar). Michael Leigh rejoined the band (lead guitar) in 1999, and Rick Johnson left the band before the next release, (leaving Leigh as the only guitarist until the final breakup). The band released Rank Outsider later that year. Less than six months later, they followed it up with 2000's Somewhere Down the Line. The live album, Here and Now (LIVE!) was released May 2001. Their final album, I'm Goin' Out And Get Hurt Tonight, with Roy Morgan (drums), was released in 2004 on Reservation Records, making it the band's only album for this label. After the Cowgirls broke up later in 2004, Todd started another band, known as Pat Todd & the Rankoutsiders.

== Critical reception ==
The Lazy Cowgirls were often compared to famous proto-punk bands such as the Ramones, the New York Dolls, and the Stooges. Brad Jones, writing in Westword, described their style as "...lean, soulful, and as abrupt as an ice pick through the forehead," and wrote that it was exemplified on their album Ragged Soul. In a review of the same album, Peter Margasak described it as the band's best, and as "...a thrilling mix of Stooge-oid rattle and soulful twang." Joe S. Harrington describes the band as "...a kind of brazen New York Dolls/Sex Pistols equivalent". He also writes that they followed in the tradition of the Leaving Trains, who were also a largely apolitical punk band. In a review of I’m Goin’ Out and Get Hurt Tonight, Fred Mills described the album as the band's "...latest, possibly greatest platter" and its sound as "...a hi-nrg [sic] roar."

== Discography ==
- Lazy Cowgirls (Restless, 1985)
- Tapping the Source (Bomp!, 1987)
- Third Time's the Charm (Grown Up Wrong EP, 1988)
- Radio Cowgirl (Sympathy for the Record Industry, 1989)
- How It Looks – How It Is (Sympathy for the Record Industry, 1990)
- Ragged Soul (Crypt, 1995)
- A Little Sex and Death (Crypt, 1997)
- Rank Outsider (Sympathy for the Record Industry, 1999)
- Somewhere Down the Line (Sympathy for the Record Industry, 2000)
- Here and Now (Live!) (Sympathy for the Record Industry live album, 2001)
- I'm Goin' Out And Get Hurt Tonight (Reservation, 2004)
