= Jim Blumenstock =

American football player (1918–1963)

No. 42
- Position: Fullback

Personal information
- Born: April 28, 1918; Rutherford, New Jersey, U.S.
- Died: July 31, 1963 (aged 45); Passaic, New Jersey, U.S.
- Listed height: 5 ft 11 in (1.80 m)
- Listed weight: 190 lb (86 kg)

Career information
- High school: Rutherford
- College: Fordham
- NFL draft: 1942: 21st round, 193rd overall pick

Career history
- New York Giants (1947)

Career NFL statistics
- Rushing yards: 168
- Rushing average: 3.1
- Receptions: 4
- Receiving yards: 15
- Total touchdowns: 2
- Stats at Pro Football Reference

James A. Blumenstock (April 28, 1918 – July 31, 1963) was an American professional football fullback. He played for the New York Giants in 1947.

A resident of Lyndhurst, New Jersey, Blumenstock died at Passaic General Hospital in Passaic, New Jersey.
