= The Bouncing Souls discography =

- Studio albums: 12
- EPs: 15
- Live albums: 2
- Compilation albums: 1
- Video albums: 2
- Music videos: 28
- Splits: 8

This is a discography of The Bouncing Souls, a New Jersey–based punk rock band. The band was formed in 1989.

== Studio albums ==
Year	Album details	Peak chart positions		
Year	Album details	US		
Year	Album details	Billboard 200	Independent	Heatseekers
1994	The Good, the Bad, and the Argyle: Released: November 1, 1994; Label: Chunksaah; Formats: LP, CS, CD	—	—	—
1996	Maniacal Laughter: Released: January 26, 1996; Label: Chunksaah; Formats: LP, CS, CD	—	—	—
1997	The Bouncing Souls: Released: September 23, 1997; Label: Epitaph; Formats: LP, CS, CD	—	—	—
1999	Hopeless Romantic: Released: May 4, 1999; Label: Epitaph; Formats: LP, CD	—	—	—
2001	How I Spent My Summer Vacation: Released: May 22, 2001; Label: Epitaph; Formats: CD, LP	—	19	—
2003	Anchors Aweigh: Released: August 26, 2003; Label: Epitaph; Formats: CD, LP	168	8	4
2006	The Gold Record: Released: June 6, 2006; Label: Epitaph; Formats: CD, LP	141	10	5
2010	Ghosts on the Boardwalk: Released: January 12, 2010; Label: Chunksaah; Formats: CD, LP	—	—	—
2012	Comet: Released: June 12, 2012; Label: Rise; Formats: CD, LP	110	20	1
2016	Simplicity: Released: July 29, 2016; Label: Rise; Formats: CD, LP, Cassette	157	8	2
2020	Volume 2: Released: October 23, 2020; Label: Pure Noise; Formats: CD, LP	—	—	—
2023	Ten Stories High: Released: March 24, 2023; Label: Pure Noise; Formats: CD, LP, Digital Download	—	—	—
2026	Born to Be: Release: June 26, 2026; Label: Self-released; Formats: CD, LP, Digital Download			
"—" denotes releases that did not chart.

== Live albums ==
Year	Album details
2005	Live: Released: November 22, 2005; Label: Chunksaah; Format: 2xCD
2011	Live at Generation Records: Released: April 16, 2011; Label: Generation Records; Format: LP

== Compilation albums ==
Year	Album details
2000	The Bad, the Worse, and the Out of Print: Released: August 29, 2000; Label: Chunksaah; Format: CD

== EPs ==
Year	Album details
1991	Ugly Bill: Released: 1991; Label: Complex; Format: 7"
1993	The Green Ball Crew E.P.: Released: 1993; Label: Chunksaah; Format: CD, 12"
1993	The Argyle E.P.: Released: 1993; Label: Chunksaah; Format: 7"
1994	Neurotic: Released: 1994; Label: Chunksaah; Format: 7"
1995	"Johnny X": Released: 1995; Label: Chunksaah; Format: 7"
1998	Tie One On! (live album): Released: November 10, 1998; Label: Epitaph; Format: CD
1999	"Fight to Live": Released: October 11, 1999; Label: Epitaph; Format: CD, 7"
2009	20th Anniversary Series: Volume One: Released: March 2009; Label: Chunksaah; Format: 7"
2009	20th Anniversary Series: Volume Two: Released: June 2009; Label: Chunksaah; Format: 7"
2009	20th Anniversary Series: Volume Three: Released: September 2009; Label: Chunksaah; Format: 7"
2009	Live at Lime with Bouncing Souls: Released: November 30, 2009; Label: Chunksaah; Format: MP3
2009	20th Anniversary Series: Volume Four: Released: December 2009; Label: Chunksaah; Format: 7"
2010	Jersey Pride: Released: April 17, 2010; Label: Chunksaah; Format: 7"
2011	Complete Control Recording Sessions: Released: April 12, 2011; Label: SideOneDummy; Format: 7"
2019	Crucial Moments: Released: March 15, 2019; Label: Rise Records; Format: CD, Vinyl, Digital Download

== Splits ==
Year	Album details	Other band(s)
1994	Bouncing Souls / Weston: Released: 1994; Label: Glue; Format: 7"	Weston
1994	Tales of Doomed Romance: Released: 1994; Label: Creep; Format: 7"	Buglte
1995	Bouncing Souls / Basic Skills / Youth Gone Mad / The Reviled: Released: 1995*Label: Rot'en Roll; Format: 7"	Basic Skills, Youth Gone Mad, The Reviled
2002	BYO Split Series Volume IV: Released: September 3, 2002; Label: Chunksaah; Format: LP, CD	Anti-Flag
2002	Tales of Doomed Romance: Released: October 1, 2002; Label: Chunksaah; Format: 7"	Zero Zero
2006	Bouncing Souls / The Lucky Stiffs: Released: 2006; Label: Pirates Press; Format: 7"	The Lucky Stiffs
2011	Chunksaah Records Split 7": Released: January 11, 2011; Label: Chunksaah; Format: 7"	Hot Water Music
2013	Electric Split: Released: 2013; Label: Chunksaah; Format: 7"	The Menzingers

== Video albums ==
Year	Album details
2003	Do You Remember? Fifteen Years Of The Bouncing Souls: Released: February 11, 2003; Label: Chunksaah
2005	Live At The Glasshouse: Released: September 27, 2005; Label: Chunkssah

== Music videos ==
Year	Song	Director	Song from	Video appears on
1994	"Joe Lies (When He Cries)"	Greg Attonito & Karen Attonito	The Good, The Bad & The Argyle	Do You Remember? 15 Years of the Bouncing Souls
1996	"Here We Go"		Maniacal Laughter	Do You Remember? 15 Years of the Bouncing Souls
1997	"East Side Mags"	Jamie Stern	The Bouncing Souls	Do You Remember? 15 Years of the Bouncing Souls, Punk-O-Rama: The Videos, Volume 1
1999	"Fight to Live"		Hopeless Romantic	Do You Remember? 15 Years of the Bouncing Souls
2001	"True Believers"	Steve Marino	How I Spent My Summer Vacation	Do You Remember? 15 Years of the Bouncing Souls, Punk-O-Rama: The Videos, Volume 1
2001	"Gone"		How I Spent My Summer Vacation	Do You Remember? 15 Years of the Bouncing Souls, Punk-O-Rama: The Videos, Volume 1
2003	"Kids and Heroes"		Anchors Aweigh	Epitaph DVD Video Mix
2003	"Sing Along Forever"	Christian Winters	Anchors Aweigh	Punk-O-Rama Vol. 9
2003	"Anchors Aweigh"		Anchors Aweigh	Punk-O-Rama 10
2006	"The Pizza Song"		The Gold Record	
2007	"Lean on Sheena"	Adam Neustadter	The Gold Record	
2009	"Gasoline"		Ghosts on the Boardwalk	
2009	"Airport Security"		Ghosts on the Boardwalk	
2009	"Badass"		Ghosts on the Boardwalk	
2012	"Ship in a Bottle"	Matthew Gere	Comet	
2012	"Static"	Matthew Gere	Comet	
2013	"Coin Toss Girl"	Kevin Slack	Comet	
2013	"Infidel"	Chillicake Films	Comet	
2013	"Comet"		Comet	
2016	"Up To Us"		Simplicity	
2017	"Satellite"	Justin R. Miller	Simplicity	
2019	"Crucial Moments"		Crucial Moments	
2020	"Highway Kings"		Volume 2	
2023	"Ten Stories High"	Jimmy Poirier	Ten Stories High	
2023	"Back to Better"	Olga & Vira "MadTwins" Ishchuk	Ten Stories High	
2023	"Higher Ground"		Ten Stories High	
2025	"United"	Bob Sweeney, Alex Ilyadis, Catherine Confrancisco and Jordan Hill	Born to Be	
2025	"Power"	Bob Sweeney	Born to Be	

== Other appearances ==
The following Bouncing Souls songs were released on compilation albums, soundtracks, and other releases. This is not an exhaustive list; songs that were first released on the band's albums, EPs, or singles or later released on The Bad, the Worse, and the Out of Print are not included.

Year	Release details	Track(s)
2002	Worldwide Tribute to the Real Oi Vol 2: Released: March 5, 2002; Label: Triple Crown Records; Format: CD	"We're Coming Back"; "The Beginning of the End"
2004	Rock Against Bush, Vol. 2: Released: August 10, 2004; Label: Fat Wreck Chords; Format: CD	"Born Free" (live)
2004	In Honor: A Compilation to Beat Cancer: Released: September 21, 2004; Label: Vagrant; Format: CD	"True Believers" (live)
2005	Punk-O-Rama 10: Released: June 7, 2005; Label: Epitaph; Format: CD	"Anchors Aweigh" (live)
2007	Our Impact Will Be Felt: Released: May 8, 2007; Label: Abacus Recordings; Format: CD	"Good Lookin' Out"
2008	All Aboard: A Tribute to Johnny Cash: Released: October 21, 2008; Label: Anchorless; Format: CD	"Man in Black"
2009	Let Them Know: The Story of Youth Brigade and BYO Records: Released: September 22, 2009; Label: BYO; Format: CD, LP	"Young 'til I Die"
2013	The Songs of Tony Sly: A Tribute: Released: October 29, 2013; Label: Fat Wreck Chords; Format: CD	"Homecoming"
