= Volume 2 (The Bouncing Souls album) =

Studio album by the Bouncing Souls
- Released: October 23, 2020
- Genre: Punk rock
- Length: 36:01
- Label: Pure Noise
- Producer: Will Yip

The Bouncing Souls chronology
Crucial Moments (2019)	Volume 2 (2020)	Ten Stories High (2023)

Singles from Volume 2
- 1. "Highway Kings" Released: September 29, 2020

Volume 2 is the eleventh studio album by the Bouncing Souls. It was released on October 23, 2020 and was recorded in the days leading up to the 2020 COVID-19 lockdown. The album contains 10 songs from their previous albums re-recorded in new styles, along with a new song, "World on Fire"."Highway Kings" was released as a single and music video.

== Background ==
In 2019, The Bouncing Souls started to play acoustic sets before their live concerts to celebrate their 30th anniversary. Inspired by the positive reception of these performances, the band teamed up with engineer and producer Will Yip, with whom they collaborated on their Crucial Moments EP, to record a studio album of the acoustic renditions. However, while in the studio, the band improvised different approaches to their songs and the styles of the recordings grew from the acoustic style originally performed live.

== Track listing ==
No.	Title	Originally recorded for	Length
1.	"Argyle"	Maniacal Laughter (1996)	2:43
2.	"Gone"	How I Spent My Summer Vacation (2001)	4:21
3.	"Late Bloomer"	How I Spent My Summer Vacation	2:54
4.	"Simple Man"	Anchors Aweigh (2003)	3:58
5.	"Hopeless Romantic"	Hopeless Romantic (1999)	3:08
6.	"Kids and Heroes"	Anchors Aweigh	3:08
7.	"Favorite Everything"	Crucial Moments (2019)	3:11
8.	"Highway Kings"	Anchors Aweigh	3:16
9.	"World on Fire"	new song	2:22
10.	"Say Anything"	The Bouncing Souls (1997)	1:58
11.	"Ghosts on the Boardwalk"	Ghosts on the Boardwalk (2010)	5:08
Total length:			36:01

== Personnel ==
Adapted from the liner notes.

Musicians

- Greg Attonito – vocals
- Pete Steinkopf – guitar, backing vocals
- Bryan Kienlen – bass, backing vocals
- George Rebelo – drums, percussion, backing vocals
- Shelley Weiss – cello, backing vocals

Artwork

- Bryan Kienlen – cover
- Chris Napolitano – photography
- George Rebelo – photography
- Josh Casuccio – photography

Production

- Hank Byerley – production
- Will Yip – production, engineering, mastering, mixing

== Charts ==
Chart (2020)	Peak position
US Top Album Sales (Billboard)	72
