= The Bad, the Worse, and the Out of Print =

The Bad the Worse and the Out of Print

Compilation album by the Bouncing Souls
- Released: August 29, 2000
- Recorded: Various
- Genre: Punk rock
- Label: Chunksaah Records

The Bouncing Souls chronology
BYO Split Series, Vol. 4 (2002)	The Bad the Worse and the Out of Print (2000)	Anchors Aweigh (2003)

The Bad the Worse and the Out of Print is a b-sides and rarities compilation album by New Jersey punk band the Bouncing Souls. It was released on August 29, 2000. It includes tracks previously released on EPs and compilations, which include covers and alternate versions of songs on previous albums, as well as demos and outtakes.

== Song information ==
Song	Recorded	Originally appeared on	Notes
"The Ballad of Johnny X"	1995	Punk Sucks	Re-recorded for Maniacal Laughter
"Mommy, Can I Go Out and Kill Tonight?"	1996	Violent World: A Tribute to the Misfits	Misfits cover
"Quick Chek Girl"	1995	Tales of Doomed Romance	
"Kids in America"	1994	Bouncing Souls/Weston	Kim Wilde cover
"P.M.R.C."	1991	Ugly Bill 7"	
"Slave to Fashion"	1989	Demo	One of their oldest recorded songs
"Code Blue"	1995	Punk Rock Jukebox	T.S.O.L. cover
"Lamar Vannoy"	1999	None	Live on WXPN
"Punk Uprisings Theme"	1997	Punk Uprising, Volume 2	Recorded for a Public-access television cable TV punk video show
"Kicked in the Head"	1993	The Green Ball Crew e.p.	
"St. Jude's Day"	1995	None	Johnny X's song recorded with The Bouncing Souls
"Pervert"	1994	Homage: Lots of Bands Doing Descendents Songs	Descendents cover
"Don't You (Forget About Me)"	1999	Before You Were Punk 2	Simple Minds cover featuring the horn section from The Pietasters
"Spank"	1993	The Green Ball Crew e.p.	
"Like a Fish in Water"	1999	Short Music for Short People	
"Born to Lose"	1995	Tales of Doomed Romance	Ted Daffan cover, re-recorded for Maniacal Laughter
"Dirt"	1992	Demo	
"East Coast! Fuck You!"	1997	Stop Racism	Live at the Capital Ballroom in Washington, DC
"I Started Drinking Again"	1995	None	Outtake from Maniacal Laughter recording sessions
"Instrumental"	1998	None	Outtake from Hopeless Romantic recording sessions
"Here We Go"	1999	"Fight to Live" single	Live in Philadelphia, Pennsylvania
"Neurotic"	1999	"Fight to Live" single	Live in Philadelphia, Pennsylvania, same concert as "Here We Go"

== Track listing ==
All songs by The Bouncing Souls unless otherwise noted.

1. "The Ballad of Johnny X" (Johnny X, The Bouncing Souls) – 2:12
2. "Mommy, Can I Go out and Kill Tonight?" (Glen Danzig) – 1:55
3. "QuickCheck Girl" – 2:59
4. "Kids in America" (Reginald Smith) – 3:37
5. "P.M.R.C." – 2:47
6. "Slave to Fashion" – 2:30
7. "Code Blue" (T.S.O.L.) – 2:02 mp3
8. "Lamar Vannoy" – 3:22
9. "Punk Uprisings Theme" – 1:00
10. "Kicked in the Head" – 3:42
11. "St. Jude's Day" (Johnny X, The Bouncing Souls) – 3:08
12. "Pervert" (Tony Lombardo, Milo Aukerman) – 1:41
13. "Don't You (Forget About Me)" (Keith Forsey, Steve Schiff) – 4:49
14. "Spank" – 2:57
15. "Like a Fish in Water" – 0:36
16. "Born to Lose" (Frankie Brown, Ted Daffan) – 1:57
17. "Dirt" – 2:50
18. "East Coast! Fuck You!" – 1:04
19. "I Started Drinking Again" – 1:44
20. "Instrumental" – 1:18
21. "Here We Go" – 3:22
22. "Neurotic" – 3:04

== Personnel ==
- Greg Attonito – vocals
- Pete Steinkopf – guitar
- Bryan Keinlen – bass, artwork
- Shal Khichi – drums
