= Tie One On! =

Extended play by The Bouncing Souls

EP (Live) by the Bouncing Souls
- Released: November 10, 1998
- Recorded: July 19, 1998
- Genre: Punk rock
- Length: 23:18
- Label: Epitaph
- Producer: None (Tracks 1–8), The Bouncing Souls and Anthony Esposito (Track 9)

The Bouncing Souls chronology
The Bouncing Souls (1997)	Tie One On! (1998)	Hopeless Romantic (1999)

Professional ratings
Review scores
Source	Rating
AllMusic	3/5 stars

Tie One On! is a live EP by New Jersey punk band the Bouncing Souls. The first 8 tracks were recorded live at The Continental in New York City, and all live versions of songs that previously appeared on the two prior studio albums, Maniacal Laughter and Bouncing Souls. The ninth track was recorded in the studio and was later re-recorded for their next studio album, Hopeless Romantic.

== Track listing ==
All tracks by The Bouncing Souls except where noted.

1. "Say Anything" – 2:02
2. "Lamar Vannoy" – 3:18
3. "Kate Is Great" – 2:55
4. "Chunksong" (Timmy Chunks, The Bouncing Souls) – 1:36
5. "East Coast! Fuck You!" – 1:29
6. "Argyle" – 3:44
7. "Born to Lose" (Frankie Brown, Ted Daffan) – 2:51
8. "Here We Go" – 2:19
9. "Kid" – 3:04

== Personnel ==
- Greg Attonito – vocals
- Pete "The Pete" Steinkopf – guitar
- Bryan "Papillon" Keinlen – bass, artwork
- Shal Khichi – drums
