= The Green Ball Crew E.P. =

The Green Ball Crew e.p.

EP by The Bouncing Souls
- Released: 1993
- Genre: Punk rock
- Length: 25:29
- Label: Chunksaah

The Bouncing Souls chronology
Ugly Bill (1991)	The Green Ball Crew e.p. (1993)	The Argyle e.p. (1993)

The Green Ball Crew e.p., is the second EP by the New Jersey punk rock band The Bouncing Souls, released in 1993. Five of the songs on the track were re-released on the 2000 compilation disc The Bad, the Worse, and the Out of Print.

Punknews.org described it as "sloppy and loose but still pretty fun."

== Track listing ==
1. "Wig" – 3:34
2. "Dirt" – 3:03
3. "Kicked" – 3:42
4. "Spank" – 2:35
5. "P.M.R.C" – 3:31
6. "Trapped" – 5:33
7. "Hate" – 3:31
