= Neurotic (EP) =

EP by The Bouncing Souls
- Released: 1994
- Recorded: 1994
- Genre: Punk rock
- Label: Rot'en Roll Records; Chunksaah

The Bouncing Souls chronology
The Argyle e.p. (1993)	Neurotic (1994)	The Good, The Bad & The Argyle (1994)

Neurotic is the fourth EP released by the New Jersey punk band The Bouncing Souls. It was released on Chunksaah Records in 1994. All of the songs on here were later released on The Good, The Bad & The Argyle.

== Track listing ==
=== Side A ===
1. "Neurotic"
2. "The Guest"

=== Side B ===
1. "Some Kind of Wonderful"
2. "I Like Your Mom"
