= The Argyle E.P. =

EP by The Bouncing Souls
- Released: 1993
- Recorded: 1993
- Genre: Punk rock
- Label: Rot'en Roll Records; Chunksaah
- Producer: Jeff Riedmiller

The Bouncing Souls chronology
The Green Ball Crew e.p. (1993)	The Argyle E.P. (1993)	Neurotic. (1994)

The Argyle e.p.. is the third EP released by the New Jersey punk band The Bouncing Souls. It was released on Chunksaah Records in 1993. All of the songs on this EP were later released on The Good, The Bad & The Argyle.

== Track listing ==
=== Side A ===
1. "Old School"

=== Side B ===
1. "These Are The Quotes From Our Favorite 80s Movies"
2. "Joe Lies (When He Cries...)"
