= Katalina =

- Birth name: Kara Wethington
- Genres: Pop, dance, punk rock
- Years active: 1996–2001
- Labels: Thump

Kara Wethington, known by the stage name Katalina, is a pop/dance artist who was signed to Thump Records. She is mostly known for her hit single "D.J. Girl" from her sole album Sonic Groove (1996). The album also spawned two more singles, "Sonic Groove" and "You'll Be My Future", but neither found much success on the charts.

== Career ==
Wethington was born in Chicago, Illinois. She moved to California at a young age, where she was raised.

Wethington was discovered by producer/ manager Jon St. James while she was attending Sonora High School in La Habra, California, and working part-time at his recording studio. When a vocalist failed to show up for a session, St. James asked Wethington to sit in and do a scratch vocal, which resulted in the song "DJ Girl" released under the pseudonym Katalina. The song peaked at #86 on the Billboard Hot 100 in October 1996.

Wethington has had several small acting parts, including the role of crust punk Bradie on the internet television series Fear of a Punk Planet (1999–2000) and Merla in the independent film That Darn Punk (2001), both of which involved members of the punk rock band The Vandals. She sang the female vocal on "Wish Me Well (You Can Go to Hell)" on The Bouncing Souls' 1999 album Hopeless Romantic, and sang the lead vocal on a cover version of "My Heart Will Go On" with The Vandals for the That Darn Punk soundtrack. She also played a small role as a singer in Simply Irresistible, a 1999 romantic comedy film for which she contributed a cover version of "Bewitched, Bothered and Bewildered" to the soundtrack.

By 2010 Wethington was living in Los Angeles and working as a publicist for designer Calleen Cordero.

== Albums ==
- Sonic Groove (1996)

== Soundtracks ==
- Bedazzled (2000) (song "DJ Girl Around the World" with Jon St. James)

== Filmography ==
- Simply Irresistible (1999) - torch singer
