= Avoid One Thing (album) =

Studio album by Avoid One Thing
- Released: April 9, 2002
- Recorded: Sound Station Seven in Providence, Rhode Island
- Genre: Rock
- Length: 31:45
- Label: SideOneDummy
- Producer: Joe Gittleman

Avoid One Thing chronology
| Avoid One Thing (2002) | Chopstick Bridge (2004) |

Professional ratings
Review scores
| Source | Rating |
|---|---|
| Allmusic | 4.5/5 stars |

Avoid One Thing is the debut album by the band of the same name. It was released in 2002.

The Bouncing Souls released a cover of "Lean on Sheena" as a single from their album The Gold Record.

== Track listing ==
- All songs by Joe Gittleman.
1. "Yakisoba" – 3:15
2. "Backyard Joey" – 2:40
3. "Lean on Sheena" – 3:04
4. "Pulse and Picture" – 2:43
5. "Every Second of Every Day" – 2:38
6. "Take a Good Look" – 3:01
7. "Rip It Up It's There" – 2:58
8. "Bomb-Building Songs" – 3:00
9. "Next Stop Batteries" – 2:23
10. "Slip 78" – 2:48
11. "Saturday" – 3:15

== Personnel ==
- Joe Gittleman - lead vocals, bass, producer
- Paul Delano - guitar, vocals
- Amy Griffin - guitar, vocals
- Dave Karcich - drums
- Tom Polce - additional musician
- Eric Fontana - additional musician
- Rob Pemberton - engineer
- Matt Ferarra - assistant engineer
- Paul Q. Kolderie - additional production
- Carl Plaster - additional production
- Jeff Lipton - mastering
- Andrew Lenoski - Gatefold design
- Len Gittleman - cover art
- Trish Miller - photography
- Jay Hale - photography
- Amy Archer - photography
