= After the Party (album) =

Studio album by the Menzingers
- Released: February 3, 2017
- Recorded: April–May 2016
- Studio: Studio 4
- Genre: Punk rock
- Length: 44:57
- Label: Epitaph
- Producer: Will Yip

The Menzingers chronology
| Rented World (2014) | After the Party (2017) | Hello Exile (2019) |

Singles from After the Party
- 1. "Lookers" Released: August 15, 2016; 2. "Bad Catholics" Released: October 27, 2016; 3. "Thick as Thieves" Released: January 30, 2017; 4. "After the Party" Released: March 23, 2017

After the Party is the fifth studio album by American punk rock band the Menzingers, released on February 3, 2017, through Epitaph Records. Despite the album's limited commercial success, peaking at No. 67 on the Billboard 200, it received a positive critical reception and is considered by many publications and music critics to be one of 2017's best punk rock and overall albums.

== Background and production ==
The Menzingers went on a co-headlining tour with MewithoutYou in November 2015 in support of their fourth album Rented World (2014). Vocalist/guitarist Greg Barnett was hoping that following the tour's end, the group would "wind down and start work on the next record." The group took a break in November and December, before spending January–March 2016 writing After the Party. From the start of the writing process, Barnett became aware that the album would be "a love letter to our twenties." The band took a break from writing to perform a couple of shows, which Barnett referred to as "that little extra push" near the end of the writing process. The group began recording in April for a period of five and a half weeks, ending in May. The band worked with Will Yip at Studio 4.

== Composition ==
The band intended to create a "fun" album where, according to Barnett, "you throw it on a jukebox in a bar and be fucking punk the whole night." At the same time, they wanted to retain the "integrity" with the storytelling aspect of their songs. Vocalist/guitarist Tom May described the album as "us saying, 'We don't have to grow up or get boring—we can keep on having a good time doing what we love.'" Dan Ozzi of Noisey wrote that "Lookers" features Barnett "looking at an old photo of himself with someone, and longing for the youth captured within."

Collin Robinson of Stereogum wrote that "Bad Catholics" is about "balancing the messiness of being human with the virtuousness impressed upon us by societal, religious, and personal beliefs." The track was originally planned for release on a split, until "all of a sudden, everybody just started falling in love" with it, according to Barnett. Barnett referred to the title-track as the "central emotional epiphany" of the record, "written in images." Barnett wanted to "use imagery as unexciting as the sludge in the bottom of a coffee cup to tell a bigger story."

== Release ==
"Lookers" was made available for streaming on August 11, 2016, before being released as a single four days later. In August and September, the band went on a tour of the U.S. with Bayside and Sorority Noise. The band went on a tour of Europe with the Bouncing Souls, before going on a brief headlining tour of the UK in October. On October 27, After the Party was announced for release, and the album's artwork and track listing was revealed. On the same day, "Bad Catholics" was released as a single. On November 15, a music video was released for "Bad Catholics", directed by Kevin Haus. The video is centred around a church picnic, which gets turned into a food fight by a few kids. On December 12, a music video was released for "Lookers", directed by Sean Stoute. It is predominantly a live-performance video, along with footage of the group in their touring van.

On January 9, 2017, "After the Party" was made available for streaming. "Thick as Thieves" was released as a single on January 30. After the Party was released on February 3, through Epitaph Records. Shortly afterwards, the band went on a brief tour of Australia. The band embarked on a headlining tour of the UK with support from the Flatliners in April 2017.

== Critical reception ==
Professional ratings
Aggregate scores
| Source | Rating |
|---|---|
| Metacritic | 80/100 |
Review scores
| Source | Rating |
| AllMusic | 4/5 stars |
| Blurt | 5/5 stars |
| Clash | 8/10 |
| Drowned in Sound | 9/10 |
| Exclaim! | 9/10 |
| Kerrang! | 4/5 stars |
| The New York Times | Favorable |
| PopMatters | 8/10 |
| Punknews.org | 4/5 stars |
| Sputnikmusic | 5/5 stars |

After the Party received mostly positive reviews from music critics. At Metacritic, which assigns a normalized rating out of 100 to reviews from mainstream critics, the album has an average score of 80 based on 16 reviews, indicating "generally favorable reviews".

=== Accolades ===
| Publication | Rank | List |
|---|---|---|
| AllMusic | N/A | The 25 Best Punk Albums of 2017 |
| Alternative Press | N/A | The 40 Best Albums of 2017 |
| Blare Magazine | 1 | The 50 Best Albums of 2017 |
| Clash | 50 | The 50 Best Albums of 2017 |
| Kerrang! | 9 | The 50 Best Albums of 2017 |
| Newsday | 16 | The 20 Best Albums of 2017 So Far |
| Noisey | 40 | The 100 Best Albums of 2017 |
| Sputnikmusic | 5 | The 50 Best Albums of 2017 |
| Stereogum | 26 | The 50 Best Albums of 2017 So Far |

== Track listing ==
All tracks were written by the Menzingers.

| No. | Title | Length |
|---|---|---|
| 1. | "Tellin' Lies" | 4:00 |
| 2. | "Thick as Thieves" | 3:15 |
| 3. | "Lookers" | 3:37 |
| 4. | "Midwestern States" | 3:27 |
| 5. | "Charlie's Army" | 2:32 |
| 6. | "House on Fire" | 3:38 |
| 7. | "Black Mass" | 2:53 |
| 8. | "Boy Blue" | 3:20 |
| 9. | "Bad Catholics" | 2:52 |
| 10. | "Your Wild Years" | 3:55 |
| 11. | "The Bars" | 4:11 |
| 12. | "After the Party" | 3:50 |
| 13. | "Livin' Ain't Easy" | 3:26 |
| Total length: | | 44:57 |

== Charts ==
| Chart (2017) | Peak position |
|---|---|
| Australian Albums (ARIA) | 61 |
| Belgian Albums (Ultratop Flanders) | 175 |
| German Albums (Offizielle Top 100) | 66 |
| Scottish Albums (Official Charts) | 65 |
| UK Vinyl Albums(OCC) | 24 |
| US Billboard 200 | 67 |
| US Independent Albums (Billboard) | 2 |
| US Top Rock Albums (Billboard) | 8 |

== Release history ==
| Region | Date | Format(s) | Label |
|---|---|---|---|
| United States | February 3, 2017 | CD; digital download; vinyl | Epitaph |
