= Anchors Aweigh (disambiguation) =

"Anchors aweigh" is an idiom referring to the raising of a ship's anchor when starting a journey.

Anchors aweigh or Anchors Away may refer to:

== Anchors Aweigh ==
- "Anchors Aweigh", a song associated with the U.S. Navy
- Anchors Aweigh (film), the 1945 movie starring Gene Kelly and Frank Sinatra
- Anchors Aweigh (album), by the New Jersey punk band Bouncing Souls
- "Anchors Aweigh", a lost episode of the British situation comedy The Likely Lads
- "Anchors Aweigh", a 1989 song by the musical duo Wax
- "Anchors Aweigh", a 1997 episode of The Wombles

== Anchors Away ==
- "Anchors Away" (SATC episode), an episode of Sex and the City
- "Anchors Away" (Law & Order episode)
