= Simplicity (The Bouncing Souls album) =

Studio album by the Bouncing Souls
- Released: July 29, 2016
- Genre: Punk rock
- Length: 29:48
- Label: Rise / Chunksaah

The Bouncing Souls chronology
Comet (2012)	Simplicity (2016)	Crucial Moments (2019)

Singles from Simplicity
- 1. "Up to Us" Released: July 30, 2016; 2. "Satellite" Released: August 17, 2017

Simplicity is the tenth studio album from the Bouncing Souls and was released on July 29, 2016 on Rise Records in conjunction with Chunksaah Records, the band's own label. The album is also their first with drummer George Rebelo, who joined the band in 2013, replacing Michael McDermott. Production on the album was overseen by John Seymour, who previously produced the band's albums, How I Spent My Summer Vacation, and Anchors Aweigh.Simplicity was the band's last full-length album of new music (Volume 2, an album of re-recorded songs, was released in 2020) until the release of 2023's Ten Stories High.

"Up to Us" and "Satellite" were released as singles and music videos.

== Track listing ==
No.	Title	Length
1.	"Driving All Night"	1:56
2.	"Euphoria"	1:45
3.	"Satellite"	2:51
4.	"Digital Twilight Zone"	1:21
5.	"I Wanna Be Bored"	1:03
6.	"Hey Aliens"	1:18
7.	"Hero Zero"	2:55
8.	"Writing On the Wall"	3:07
9.	"Rebel Song"	2:02
10.	"Tightrope"	2:24
11.	"Gravity"	3:05
12.	"Bees"	2:14
13.	"Up to Us"	3:47

== Credits ==
The Bouncing Souls

- Greg Attonito – vocals
- Pete Steinkopf – guitar
- Bryan Kienlen – bass
- George Rebelo – drums

== Charts ==
Chart (2016)	Peak position
US Billboard 200	157
US Heatseekers Albums (Billboard)	2
US Independent Albums (Billboard)	8
US Top Rock Albums (Billboard)	13
