= Do You Remember? =

Do You Remember(?) may refer to:

== Music ==
=== Albums ===
- Do You Remember? (album), by Mac Dre, 2002
- Do You Remember?, by the Bouncing Souls, 2003

=== Songs ===
- "Do You Remember?" (The Beach Boys song), 1964
- "Do You Remember" (Jarryd James song), 2015
- "Do You Remember" (Jay Sean song), 2009
- "Do You Remember?" (Phil Collins song), 1990
- "Do You Remember", by Aaron Carter from Another Earthquake!, 2002
- "Do You Remember", by Ane Brun from It All Starts with One, 2011
- "Do You Remember", by Blake Shelton from Based on a True Story..., 2013
- "Do You Remember", by Chance the Rapper from The Big Day, 2019
- "Do You Remember?", by Darren Hayes from Homosexual, 2022
- "Do You Remember", by Dave Matthews Band from Come Tomorrow, 2018
- "Do You Remember?", by Hüsker Dü from Everything Falls Apart, 1993 rerelease
- "Do You Remember?", by Janis Ian from Who Really Cares, 1969
- "Do You Remember", by Lydia from Devil, 2013
- "Do You Remember", by Rudimental from Toast to Our Differences, 2019
- "Do You Remember", a 1977 medley by Long Tall Ernie & the Shakers, released on the compilation Long Play Album, 1981

== Other uses ==
- Do You Remember?, a 1978 British television series featuring Ian Holm
- Do You Remember, a 2022 novel by Freida McFadden
- Do You Remember?, a 2023 children's book by Sydney Smith
