= Anchors Aweigh (album) =

Studio album by the Bouncing Souls
- Released: August 26, 2003
- Recorded: January 2003
- Studios: Lakeview Farms, North Brookfield, Massachusetts; Water Music, Hoboken, New Jersey
- Genres: Punk rock; pop-punk
- Length: 47:28
- Label: Epitaph
- Producers: John Seymour, Pete Steinkopf, Bryan Kienlen

The Bouncing Souls chronology
The Bad the Worse and the Out of Print (2002)	Anchors Aweigh (2003)	The Gold Record (2006)

Singles from Anchors Aweigh
- 1. "Kids and Heroes" Released: 2003; 2. "Sing Along Forever" Released: 2003; 3. "Anchors Aweigh" Released: 2003

Anchors Aweigh is the sixth studio album to be recorded by American punk rock band the Bouncing Souls. It was released on August 26, 2003, though Epitaph Records. Following the release of their fifth studio album How I Spent My Summer Vacation (2001), bassist Bryan Kienlen ended an intimate relationship and wrote new material as a result of it. Recording took place at Lakeview Farms, North Brookfield, Massachusetts, and Water Music, Hoboken, New Jersey, with John Seymour as the main producer, and Kienlen and guitarist Pete Steinkopf as co-producers. Anchors Aweigh is a pop-punk and punk-rock album that has a darker sound than its predecessor; the band experimented with melodies and rhythms during the writing stage.

Anchors Aweigh received generally favorable reviews from critics, several of whom complimented the Bouncing Souls' musicianship. The album peaked at number 168 on the Billboard 200, and number eight on the Independent Albums component chart. The band toured the United States, Europe, and Canada prior to the album's release. Following the release, they went on additional stints of the US and Europe with Tsunami Bomb and Strike Anywhere to close out the year. The Bouncing Souls went on three more US tours with Hot Water Music, Randy, and Against Me!, as well as a tour of Australia, and appeared on Warped Tour, throughout 2004.

"Kids and Heroes", "Sing Along Forever" and "Anchors Aweigh" were released as singles and music videos.

== Background ==
The Bouncing Souls released their fifth studio album How I Spent My Summer Vacation in May 2001 through Epitaph Records. It was promoted with an extensive tour with Hot Water Music; in 2002, the band released the compilation album The Bad, the Worse, and the Out of Print and a split with Anti-Flag. During this time, bassist Bryan Kienlen went through a difficult period in his life following the end of an eight-year-long relationship. He subsequently wrote much of the material that would be released on the band's next album. Prior to the Plea for Peace Tour, the band had written eight songs; after the tour, they spent more time writing. The band toured Japan, returned to the US to continue working on new material, and then went on a two-week California tour with Anti-Flag.

John Seymour produced Anchors Aweigh with co-production from guitarist Pete Steinkopf and Kienlen. Sessions occurred in January 2003, mainly at Lakeview Farms Studios in North Brookfield, Massachusetts, with assistant engineer Chris Evans. The location they chose is distant from cities, allowing the band to avoid being distracted by outside influences. Additional recording was done at Water Music in Hoboken, New Jersey, with assistant engineers Ted Young and John Bender. The tracks were mixed at Big Blue Meenie Recording Studio in Jersey City, New Jersey, with assistant engineer Cody Brown, and were mastered by Robert Vosgien at Capitol Mastering in Los Angeles, California.

== Composition ==
The music of Anchors Aweigh has been described as punk rock and pop-punk; it retains the atmosphere of How I Spent My Summer Vacation and moves it into darker territory. Drummer Michael McDermott said this was intentional because the band experimented with different rhythms and melodies during the writing process. Vocalist Greg Attonito said that album's title's technical meaning is "pulling up an anchor on a boat and leaving for an adventure". The album opens with the fast-tempo track "Apartment 5F" whose loud guitar work leads into the slow, mellow intro of "Kids and Heroes". "New Day" is about living in the moment rather than letting life pass one by. "Sing Along Forever" exemplifies the album's overall tone; according to Nick Madsen of IGN, it is "An energized, punk rock song at heart ... It's your typical three chord song, easy to learn and even easier to sing along to". "Born Free" is sociopolitical commentary in the vein of Michael Moore that comments on US politics. Attonito said; "As you get older, you worry more about the world and what's going on around you ... But that's just the point that needs to be talked about".

"Inside Out", one of the more-hostile tracks on the album, is centered around a minor chord progression. It deals with the difficulty of living while on tour. "Simple Man" talks about a desire for a more-structured life and is similar in form to "Gone", the closing track of How I Spent My Summer Vacation. "Better Days" is about loneliness in the aftermath of a relationship. "Night Train" is a slow song that includes a sample of a motorbike and Kienlen on lead vocals. "Todd's Song", which features strings by John Angier and deals with suicide, is dedicated to Todd Eckhardt of The Pietasters. "Highway Kings" has additional background vocals from Seymour, as well as Epitaph employee Jeff Abarta and the band Madcap. "Anchors Aweigh" includes piano parts from Kienlen, who performs lead vocals on "The Day I Turned My Back on You", which includes references to Bruce Springsteen. The album's almost-five-minute closing track "I'm from There" leads into crackling sounds and the acoustic hidden track "The Fall Song".

== Release and promotion ==
In March 2003, The Bouncing Souls went on a brief East Coast US tour with The Casualties. A staff member of Epitaph told the band if they could make a music video within two weeks, it could be included on the Punk-O-Rama DVD. They went to a friend's house and randomly chose one of the album's tracks. A music video for "Kids and Heroes" was filmed at Asbury Park, New Jersey. On April 22, 2003, Anchors Aweigh was announced for release in August. On May 21, 2003, the album's artwork was posted online. The band toured Europe as part of the Deconstruction Tour in May and June 2003, which was followed by the track listing on June 17, 2003. On July 1, 2003, "Kids and Heroes" was posted on the label's website. Eight days later, the music video for the track was posted on the same website.

After appearing at Hellfest 2K3 in Syracuse, New York, and Krazy Fest 6 in Louisville, Kentucky, The Bouncing Souls embarked on the Punk-O-Rama tour in Canada with Hot Water Music, the Forgotten, and Worthless United. Anchors Aweigh was made available for streaming via an E-card on August 15, 2003, and was released through Epitaph Records on August 26 the same year. According to Derek Scancarelli of Forbes, the artwork, which was made by Kienlen, symbolizes "a ship sailing off into the dark distance, marking the end of a chapter". Kienlen made the cover art using oil paints rather than using his typical 2D comic-book style. The album was promoted with three release shows, and a headlining US tour with Tsunami Bomb, Strike Anywhere, and Vision between September and November 2003.

Following this, The Bouncing Souls toured Europe with Tsunami Bomb until December. On January 16, 2004, the band appeared on Late Night with Conan O'Brien, where they performed "Kids and Heroes". In February 2004, the band went on a West Coast US tour, which was dubbed the True Bromance Tour, with Hot Water Music, Let It Burn, Randy, and Longshot. The following month, the band toured Australia with Frenzal Rhomb; appeared at Skate and Surf Festival before touring the US with Avial, the Unseen, and Let It Burn. Randy was due to appear on the tour but their label would not provide support to get the band to the US. Between June and August 2004, The Bouncing Souls appeared on the Warped Tour. A music video for "Anchors Aweigh" was filmed on June 25, 2004, at Asbury Park boardwalk in New Jersey. They played several European shows with Strung Out and Reel Big Fish. In November 2004, they embarked on a brief East Coast tour with Against Me!, Murphy's Law, and Let It Burn. They opened 2005 with a one-off show in California that was filmed for The Show Must Go Off! series. Following this, they supported Dropkick Murphys on their headlining UK tour in February and March 2005. The Bouncing Souls toured the US East Coast in April 2005 with Let It Burn, The Loved Ones, and The Explosion, and appeared at The Bamboozle festival.

== Reception ==
Professional ratings
Review scores
Source	Rating
AllMusic	3.5/5 stars
IGN	7.7/10
Now	2/5
Ox-Fanzine	9/10
Punknews.org	4/5 stars
Rolling Stone	3/5 stars

Anchors Aweigh was met with generally favorable reviews from music critics. Ox-Fanzine writer Lauri Wessel said it has "hits that can't get out of your head" and called it the "best [album of the year] so far". AllMusic reviewer Robert L. Doerschuk wrote the band sound "tight; McDermott in particular earns his stripes as a punk virtuoso in the artful tempo manipulations" in tracks such as 'Apartment 5F' and 'Blind Date' ". Nick Flanagan of Now said the band "plow through the songs on Anchors Aweigh in a workman-like manner, sounding sincere, [and] angry". According to Rolling Stone writer John D. Luerssen, the band were showing "more heart than ever", and when the fans "pick up this stellar disc, that very void will be filled". IGN's Nick Madsen described the album as a "focus on good times with old friends minus any of the bull$#!+. It's refreshing to say the least". Aside from odd misstep, such as "Born Free" and "The Fall Song", he called it a "great" release.

Punknews.org founder Aubin Paul said Anchors Aweigh displays a "new side of the Souls" though "at its core, it's still a bunch of friends who clearly play this music because it moves them". Stuart Green of Exclaim! added to this, noting the band incorporates "more mood and atmosphere in their songs and production ... their songwriting and musicality is sounding decidedly more confident". CMJ New Music Monthly's Chad Swiatecki wrote the album is a "surprise ... sport[ing] songs with sharp claws that dig in like never before". The Free Lance-Star writer Craig Graziano criticized the band for attempting to retread How I Spent My Summer Vacation, and added; "[n]ot much musical ground is broken". Grady Gadbow of Lollipop Magazine said the album's sole "melodic strength" is its "call and response vocals and ubiquitous whoa-oh-ohs", and added; "those skills alone do not make a record rock. That takes soul."

Anchors Aweigh peaked at number 168 on the Billboard 200 and at number eight on the Independent Albums chart.

== Track listing ==
All songs by the Bouncing Souls.

1. "Apartment 5F" – 2:10
2. "Kids and Heroes" – 2:53
3. "New Day" – 3:41
4. "Sing Along Forever" – 1:35
5. "Born Free" – 1:23
6. "Inside Out" – 2:24
7. "Simple Man" – 4:19
8. "Better Days" – 2:13
9. "Night Train" – 3:01
10. "Todd's Song" – 2:06
11. "Blind Date" – 2:21
12. "Highway Kings" – 1:49
13. "Anchors Aweigh" – 2:10
14. "I Get Lost" – 2:57
15. "The Day I Turned My Back on You" – 2:49
16. "I'm from There" – 9:39 (includes hidden track "The Fall Song")

== Personnel ==
Personnel per booklet.

The Bouncing Souls

- Pete Steinkopf – guitar, background vocals
- Bryan Kienlen – bass guitar, background vocals, keyboard (track 13), lead vocals (tracks 9 and 15)
- Greg Attonito – lead vocals
- Michael McDermott – drums

Additional musicians

- John Angier – strings (track 10)
- John Seymour – additional background vocals (track 12)
- Jeff Abarta – additional background vocals (track 12)
- Madcap – additional background vocals (track 12)

Production and design

- John Seymour – producer
- Pete Steinkopf – co-producer
- Bryan Kienlen – co-producer, art, road trip pictures
- Ernie Parada – layout
- Andre Constantini – band photography
- Chris Evans – assistant engineer
- Carl Plaster – drum tech
- Ted Young – assistant engineer
- John Bender – assistant engineer
- Cody Brown – assistant engineer
- Robert Vosgien – mastering

== Charts ==
Chart performance for Anchors Aweigh
Chart (2003)	Peak position
US Billboard 200	168
US Independent Albums (Billboard)	8
