= Avoid One Thing =

American punk rock band

- Origin: Boston, Massachusetts, USA
- Genres: Punk rock
- Years active: 2002–2005; 2019–present
- Labels: Side One Dummy
- Members: Joe Gittleman; Amy Griffin; John Lynch
- Past members: Paul Delano; Dave Karcich

Avoid One Thing is a punk band that started as a side project by The Mighty Mighty Bosstones' bassist Joe Gittleman. The Boston-based group's first album, titled Avoid One Thing, was released in 2002 on Side One Dummy Records. The album was written and recorded almost solely by Gittleman. Gittleman assembled a band with which to tour and play his music. Before the release of the band's next album in 2004, the band went through several lineup changes. John Lynch joined the band after Dave Karcich's death due to a sudden brain aneurysm. Later, Delano left and the band continued as a three-piece. The trio returned to the studio and released Chopstick Bridge in 2004. The album reflected the combined efforts of all three band members and sounds vastly different from their first in many respects; Amy Griffin and Gittleman even split lead vocals on a few tracks. After the release of this album, the band toured until February 2005 before going on hiatus. Since that time, Griffin has been playing guitar for Darkbuster and Gittleman has moved to Los Angeles and is once again a member of the reunited Bosstones. Paul Delano underwent emergency surgery in 2006 and a series of benefit shows were held. John Lynch has since joined up with David Minehan and is now playing drums for The Neighborhoods.

The Bouncing Souls covered the song "Lean on Sheena" on their 2006 The Gold Record.

The band got back together and released a new record in September 2019 titled Right Here Where You Left Me on Big Rig Records.

== Discography ==
=== Albums ===
- Avoid One Thing (Side One Dummy Records, 2002)
- Chopstick Bridge (Side One Dummy Records, 2004)
- Right Here Where You Left Me (Big Rig Records, 2019)

=== Compilations ===
- 2002 Warped Tour Compilation (Side One Dummy Records, 2002)
- Giant Rock N Roll Swindle (Fork In Hand Records, 2002)
- Atticus: ...dragging the lake (Side One Dummy Records, 2002)
- 2003 Warped Tour Compilation (Side One Dummy Records, 2003)
- Outlaw Volleyball - Music Inspired From the Game (Sumthing Else Music Works, 2003)
- 2004 Warped Tour Compilation (Side One Dummy Records, 2004)
- In Honor: A Compilation To Beat Cancer (Vagrant Records, 2004)
