= Straight to Hell (The Clash song) =

Single by the Clash

from the album Combat Rock
- A-side: "Should I Stay or Should I Go" (double A-side)
- Released: 17 September 1982
- Genre: Punk rock
- Length: 5:30; 6:56 (Unedited version); 3:57 (Edited version)
- Label: CBS
- Songwriters: Joe Strummer; Mick Jones; Paul Simonon; Topper Headon
- Producer: The Clash

The Clash singles chronology
"Rock the Casbah" (1982)	"Straight to Hell" / "Should I Stay or Should I Go" (1982)	"This Is England" (1985)

"Straight to Hell" is a song by the English rock band the Clash from their fifth studio album Combat Rock (1982). It was released as a double A-side single with "Should I Stay or Should I Go" in September 1982 in 12" and 7" vinyl format (the 7" vinyl is also available as a picture disc).

== Writing and recording ==
"Straight to Hell" was written and recorded toward the end of the Clash's New York recording sessions for Combat Rock. Mick Jones' guitar technician Digby Cleaver describes the sessions as "a mad, creative rush" that occurred on 30 December 1981, the day before the Clash were due to depart New York.

Joe Strummer reflected on the creative process in a 1991 piece about the track:

I'd written the lyric staying up all night at the Iroquois Hotel. I went down to Electric Lady and I just put the vocal down on tape, we finished about twenty to midnight. We took the E train from the Village up to Times Square. I'll never forget coming out of the subway exit, just before midnight, into a hundred billion people, and I knew we had just done something really great.

== Lyrical themes ==
"Straight to Hell" has been described by writer Pat Gilbert as being saturated by a "colonial melancholia and sadness".

Like many songs by the Clash, the lyrics of "Straight to Hell" decry injustice. The first verse refers to the shuttering of steel mills in Northern England and unemployment spanning generations. It also considers the alienation of non-English-speaking immigrants in British society.

The second verse concerns the abandonment of children in Vietnam who were fathered by American soldiers during the Vietnam War. The phrase "Amerasian blues" refers to an Amerasian child with an absent American father, his "papa-san". The child has a photograph of his parents and pleads with his father to take him home to the United States, but his plea is rejected with the father saying “Lemme tell you 'bout your blood, bamboo kid, it ain’t Coca-Cola, it’s rice.”

Strummer sings of a "volatile Molotov" thrown at Puerto Rican immigrants in Alphabet City, a reference to arson that destroyed buildings occupied by immigrant communities before the area was subject to gentrification.

== Musical style ==
The song has a distinctive beat. Drummer Topper Headon said: "You couldn't play rock 'n' roll to it. Basically it's a bossa nova." Joe Strummer said: "Just before the take, Topper said to me 'I want you to play this' and he handed me an R Whites lemonade bottle in a towel. He said, 'I want you to beat the bass drum with it.'"

== Alternative version ==
The duration of the Combat Rock version of the song is 5:30. This version was edited from the original track, which lasted almost seven minutes. The original track featured extra lyrics and a more prominent violin part.

The edit occurred during the early 1982 mixing sessions in which the Clash and Glyn Johns reduced Combat Rock from a 77-minute double album to a 46-minute single album.

The full, unedited version of "Straight to Hell" may be found on the Clash on Broadway and Sound System box sets.

== Personnel ==
- Joe Strummer - vocals
- Mick Jones – guitars, keyboards, sound effects
- Paul Simonon – bass guitar
- Topper Headon – drums

== Reception ==
In 1982, NME reviewer Adrian Thrills gave the double A-side single release "Straight to Hell"/"Should I Stay or Should I Go" four-and-a-half stars out of five. Despite "Should I Stay or Should I Go" having received more radio airplay, Thrills wrote that "Straight to Hell" "reaffirm[s] that there is still life in The Clash". Vulture cited it as "punk poetry of the highest order, and maybe real poetry too".

Simon Hills of Record Mirror selected it as the magazine's "Single of the Week." Hills highly praised "Straight to Hell," writing that despite his own biases, The Clash could still "churn out hefty slices of rawness and excitement." He described the track as "atmospheric, original and grating," opining that it deserved to become the band's biggest hit to date, though he noted it was "not as hot as the album version." Conversely, Hills was heavily critical of "Should I Stay or Should I Go" (penned by Mick Jones), dismissing it as "probably their worst number yet" and concluding that its status as a double A-side was "a mystery."

== Use in other media ==
This song was featured in the 2000 comedy film, Kevin & Perry Go Large and in Complicity from that same year.

== Notable covers and samples ==
"Straight to Hell" has been covered or sampled by many artists. Heather Nova and Moby covered the song in 1999 for the Clash tribute album Burning London. In 2007, British rapper M.I.A. sampled "Straight to Hell" in her song "Paper Planes" which, like "Straight to Hell", deals with the topic of immigration. "Paper Planes" was itself sampled in Jay-Z and T.I.'s 2008 song "Swagga Like Us"; the songwriters of "Straight to Hell" received co-writing credits for both songs.

The song was refashioned by Mick Jones and Lily Allen for the War Child: Heroes album, released in the UK on 16 February 2009, and in the US on 24 February 2009 by Astralwerks. Jakob Dylan and Elvis Costello performed a cover of the song on season 1, episode 12 of Costello's show Spectacle: Elvis Costello with..., entitled "She & Him, Jenny Lewis and Jakob Dylan" and aired on Channel 4 in the UK, CTV in Canada, and the Sundance Channel in the United States in 2008–2009. While the Clash were known for covering (and popularizing) reggae songs, "Straight to Hell" went in the other direction, being covered by Horace Andy in 2017.

American punk rock band the Menzingers covered the song in a noise-influenced format on their 2007 debut album, A Lesson in the Abuse of Information Technology.
