= BYO Split Series Volume IV =

Studio album by the Bouncing Souls and Anti-Flag
- Released: September 3, 2002
- Recorded: April–June 2002
- Genre: Punk rock; hardcore punk
- Length: 33:34
- Label: BYO (BYO 084)
- Producer: Bryan Kienlen, Pete Steinkopf, Anti-Flag, Matt Harrington

BYO Split Series chronology
Volume III (2002)	BYO Split Series Volume IV (2002)	Volume V (2004)

The Bouncing Souls chronology
How I Spent My Summer Vacation (2001)	BYO Split Series Volume IV (2002)	The Bad, the Worse, and the Out of Print (2002)

Anti-Flag chronology
Mobilize (2002)	BYO Split Series Volume IV (2002)	The Terror State (2003)

Professional ratings
Review scores
Source	Rating
AllMusic	3/5 stars
Punknews.org	4/5 stars

BYO Split Series Volume IV is a split album released in 2002 as the fourth entry in BYO Records BYO Split Series. The album features twelve tracks by American punk rock bands the Bouncing Souls and Anti-Flag. Each band covers one song originally by the other, with The Bouncing Souls performing "That's Youth" and Anti-Flag performing "The Freaks, Nerds & Romantics". Other covers are Cock Sparrer's "We're Coming Back" and Sticks and Stones' "Less Than Free" by The Bouncing Souls and the Buzzcocks' "Ever Fallen In Love" by Anti-Flag. The remaining tracks were originally recorded for this album.

For the release of this album, The Bouncing Souls and Anti-Flag toured nationally together.

== Track listing ==
The Bouncing Souls
No.	Title	Writer(s)	Length
1.	"Punks in Vegas"	Greg Attonito, Pete Steinkopf, Bryan Kienlen, Michael McDermott	2:36
2.	"No Security"	Attonito, Steinkopf, Keinlen, McDermott	1:22
3.	"That's Youth" (originally performed by Anti-Flag)	Justin Sane	3:04
4.	"Bryan's Lament"	Attonito, Steinkopf, Keinlen, McDermott	2:16
5.	"We're Coming Back" (originally performed by Cock Sparrer)	Colin McFaul, Steve Burgess, Steve Bruce, Mickey Beaufoy, Chris Skepis	3:10
6.	"Less Than Free" (originally performed by Sticks and Stones)	Pete Ventantonio	4:11

Anti-Flag
No.	Title	Writer(s)	Length
7.	"America Got It Right"	Sane	2:56
8.	"Smash It to Pieces"	Sane	2:49
9.	"No Borders, No Nations"	Chris Head, Chris #2, Sane, Pat Thetic	3:14
10.	"Gifts from America: With Love, the U.S.A."	Sane	2:41
11.	"The Freaks, Nerds, and Romantics" (originally performed by The Bouncing Souls)	Attonito, Steinkopf, Keinlen, Shal Khichi	2:31
12.	"Ever Fallen in Love (With Someone You Shouldn't've)" (originally performed by the Buzzcocks)	Pete Shelley	2:44
Total length:			33:34

== Personnel ==
Tracks 1–6:

- Greg Attonito – vocals
- Pete Steinkopf – guitar
- Bryan Kienlen – bass
- Michael McDermott – drums
- Tim Gilles – engineer
- Arun Venkatesh – assistant engineer

Tracks 7–12:

- Chris Head – guitar, vocals
- Chris #2 – bass, vocals
- Justin Sane – guitar, vocals
- Pat Thetic – drums
- Matt Harrington – engineer
- Kevin Facer – assistant engineer
- Tommy M. – drum technician
- Mark Defiant – vocals on "Smash it to Pieces"
- The Code – backing vocals on "Smash it to Pieces" and "Gifts from America: With Love, the U.S.A."
