= Chopstick Bridge =

Studio album by Avoid One Thing
- Released: May 4, 2004
- Recorded: Camp Street Studios in Cambridge, Massachusetts
- Genre: Rock
- Length: 43:59
- Label: SideOneDummy
- Producer: Paul Q. Kolderie

Avoid One Thing chronology
Avoid One Thing (2002)	Chopstick Bridge (2004)

Professional ratings
Review scores
Source	Rating
Allmusic	link

Chopstick Bridge is the second album by Avoid One Thing.

The album was released as an Enhanced CD with an 18–minute documentary film by Len Gittleman. The film includes footage of Joe Gittleman at a Dunkin' Donuts drive–thru, Gittleman and Amy Griffin jamming, John Lynch's Kiss memorabilia, Griffin riding her bicycle, and the band practicing and performing.

== Track listing ==
- All songs by Joe Gittleman unless noted.
1. "Armbands And Braids" – 2:45
2. "Chopstick Bridge" – 2:56
3. "All That You've Heard" (Amy Griffin) – 3:43
4. "A Lot Like This" – 2:46
5. "Judy" (Gittleman/Griffin) – 3:30
6. "About You" – 3:16
7. "Next Stop Is The Last Stop" (Gittleman/Griffin) – 2:35
8. "Gone And Forgotten" – 3:59
9. "Streetlight" – 3:17
10. "Fillmore East" – 2:54
11. "The Airplane" (Griffin) – 0:30
12. "Renegade" – 3:30
13. "Capital Letters" (Griffin) – 3:22
14. "Watching Us Anyway" (Gittleman/Griffin) – 4:56

== Personnel ==
- Paul Q. Kolderie – Producer, Engineer
- Adam Taylor – Assistant Engineer
- Matt Beaudoin – Additional Recording
- Jeff Lipton – Mastering
- Susan Butler – Photography
- Maura Lynch – Photography
- Joe Gittleman – Vocals, Bass
- Amy Griffin – Vocals, Guitar
- John Lynch – Drums
