= Some of It Was True =

Studio album by the Menzingers
- Released: October 13, 2023
- Studio: Sonic Ranch
- Length: 44:09
- Label: Epitaph

The Menzingers chronology
Hello Exile (2019)	Some of It Was True (2023)	Everything I Ever Saw (2026)

Singles from Some of It Was True
- 1. "There’s No Place in This World for Me" Released: July 18, 2023; 2. "Hope Is A Dangerous Little Thing" Released: August 16, 2023; 3. "Come On Heartache" Released: September 20, 2023

Some of It Was True is the seventh studio album by American punk rock band the Menzingers. It was released on October 13, 2023, by Epitaph Records.

== Background ==
On July 18, 2023, the Menzingers released the first single "There’s No Place in This World for Me", while hinting of a new upcoming album. The music video for the single was recorded at Sonic Ranch.

On August 16, 2023, the band announced the release of their new album, alongside the first single "Hope Is A Dangerous Little Thing". Speaking of the new album, guitarist and vocalist Greg Barnett said:

This record just feels different for us. It's a really important one in our catalog, and a pivotal moment in our history. We have the liberty of our fans growing with us now, and after writing these lyrical songs about where we are in life, we decided to take other peoples' stories and make something bigger out of it.

The third single "Come On Heartache" was released on September 20, 2023.

== Critical reception ==
Professional ratings
Aggregate scores
Source	Rating
Metacritic	67/100
Review scores
Source	Rating
Exclaim!	7/10
Kerrang!	4/5 stars

Some of It Was True was met with "generally favorable" reviews from critics. At Metacritic, which assigns a weighted average rating out of 100 to reviews from mainstream publications, this release received an average score of 67, based on 6 reviews.

Nick Ruskell of Kerrang said the album is "written with smartness, a rough, street poetry, and a huge dollop of Americana populated by burned-out restaurants and big cars and rock'n'roll dreamers and John Hughes suburbia", giving the release a four out of five.

== Track listing ==
Some of It Was True track listing
No.	Title	Length
1.	"Hope Is a Dangerous Little Thing"	3:11
2.	"There's No Place in This World for Me"	3:22
3.	"Nobody Stays"	3:40
4.	"Some of It Was True"	2:20
5.	"Try"	3:57
6.	"Come on Heartache"	2:55
7.	"Ultraviolet"	3:49
8.	"Take It to Heart"	3:23
9.	"Love at the End"	2:57
10.	"Alone in Dublin"	3:41
11.	"High Low"	3:51
12.	"I Didn't Miss You (Until You Were Gone)"	3:13
13.	"Running in the Roar of the Wind"	3:50

iTunes Deluxe Version
No.	Title	Length
14.	"Gone West"	2:46
15.	"The Last One Killed Me"	2:16

== Charts ==
Chart performance for Some of It Was True
Chart (2023)	Peak position
Scottish Albums (Official Charts)	94
UK Independent Albums (Official Charts)	37
