= Worthless United =

Worthless United was an American punk rock band from New Jersey, United States. Originally named Worthless (the band added the "United" in 2001), the band was formed in late 1993 by singer Dave Colantoni and bassist Scott Asbury. Guitarist Zak Kaplan was added to the lineup in 1996 and drummer Steve Asbury joined later that year, solidifying the lineup that would remain consistent till their breakup in 2003.

The band released two demo cassettes in 1995 and 1996, the "Revenge of Dr. Stanley" EP in 1997, a split EP with S.O.V. and were featured on the "Right To Assemble Vol. 1" compilation in 1998, and their first full length "Nice Night" in 1999. After a brief hiatus the band regrouped in 2000 with "Which Side Are You On", released on The Bouncing Souls' Chunksaah Records, which featured 6 new songs and 6 songs from previous releases. In 2001 Worthless became known as Worthless United and in 2002 released the "I Am Nothing" EP on Now Or Never Records / Chunksaah Records. In 2003 Worthless United released "A Nation Under" on Now Or Never Records and followed the release by touring across all of North American with bands such as The Bouncing Souls, Hot Water Music, Bigwig, Catch 22, and River City Rebels. Worthless United abruptly broke up in November 2003. A year later Worthless United played a "reunion/final" show in Asbury Park, NJ where the band had begun over 10 years earlier. Since then they have publicly played a few times, first in 2007 in Asbury Park, a New Brunswick basement show in 2009, and The Bouncing Souls' Home For The Holidays show at the Stone Pony in Asbury Park. In 2010, Worthless United and the River City Rebels performed together in Asbury Park, NJ as one band doing songs from both under the name Worthless City Rebels.
