= Comet (The Bouncing Souls album) =

Studio album by the Bouncing Souls
- Released: June 12, 2012
- Genre: Punk rock
- Length: 34:26
- Label: Rise / Chunksaah
- Producer: Bill Stevenson

The Bouncing Souls chronology
| Complete Control Recording Sessions (2011) | Comet (2012) | Simplicity (2016) |

Singles from Comet
- 1. "Ship in a Bottle" Released: July 11, 2012; 2. "Static" Released: July 14, 2012; 3. "Coin Toss Girl" Released: September 18, 2012; 4. "Infidel" Released: May 28, 2013; 5. "Comet" Released: June 10, 2013

Comet is the ninth studio album by the American punk rock band the Bouncing Souls. It was released on June 12, 2012, by Rise Records in conjunction with Chunksaah Records, the band's own label. It was produced by Bill Stevenson and recorded at The Blasting Room. It debuted at number 110 on the Billboard 200 chart.

"Ship in a Bottle", "Static", "Coin Toss Girl", "Infidel" and "Comet" were released as singles and music videos.

Professional ratings
Review scores
| Source | Rating |
|---|---|
| AbsolutePunk | (86%) |
| AllMusic | 3.5/5 stars |
| Laut.de | 3/5 stars |
| Punknews.org | 2.5/5 stars |

== Track listing ==
| No. | Title | Length |
|---|---|---|
| 1. | "Baptized" | 3:22 |
| 2. | "Fast Times" | 3:22 |
| 3. | "Static" | 2:56 |
| 4. | "Coin Toss Girl" | 4:05 |
| 5. | "Comet" | 5:21 |
| 6. | "We Love Fun" | 2:33 |
| 7. | "Infidel" | 1:42 |
| 8. | "DFA" | 2:34 |
| 9. | "In Sleep" | 4:39 |
| 10. | "Ship in a Bottle" | 3:48 |
| Total length: | | 34:26 |

== Credits ==
The Bouncing Souls

- Greg Attonito – vocals
- Pete Steinkopf – guitar
- Bryan Kienlen – bass
- Michael McDermott – drums

Artwork

- Bryan Kienlen – Artwork
- John J. Sass – Liner Notes
- Zak Kaplan – Layout, Photography

Production

- Bill Stevenson – Producer, engineer
- Jason Livermore – Mastering, engineer, mixing, producer
- Chris Beeble & Andrew Berlin – Engineers
