= Chamberlain Waits =

Studio album by The Menzingers
- Released: April 13, 2010
- Recorded: January 2010
- Studio: Atlas, Chicago, Illinois
- Genre: Punk rock
- Length: 30:41
- Label: Red Scare Industries
- Producer: Matt Allison

The Menzingers chronology
A Lesson in the Abuse of Information Technology (2007)	Chamberlain Waits (2010)	On the Impossible Past (2012)

Chamberlain Waits is the second studio album by American punk rock band The Menzingers. The album was voted the best release of 2010, by Australian radio show Bullying The Jukebox.

== Release ==
On January 5, 2010, Chamberlain Waits was announced for release in three months' time. Following this, the band supported Anti-Flag on their headlining US tour. On March 2, 2010, the album's artwork and track listing were posted online. On March 16, 2010, "I Was Born" was released as a single with "Mea Culpa Cabana" and "My Friend Chris" as its B-sides. Later in the month, the band performed at Harvest of Hope Fest. Chamberlain Waits was made available for streaming on Myspace on April 6, 2010, before being released through Red Scare Industries on April 13, 2010. Following performances at Rad Fest and Windy City Sound Clash festivals, the band went on a Midwest and West Coast tour with Cheap Girls. They went on a Southern and East Coast tour with Soul Control, leading up to an appearance at Insubordination Fest. In May and June 2011, the band supported Title Fight on their first headlining US tour.

== Reception ==
Professional ratings
Review scores
Source	Rating
Exclaim!	(Positive) link
Punknews.org	4/5 stars

"Chamberlain Waits" was Exclaim!'s No. 8 Punk Album of 2010. "Chamberlain Waits" was Punknews.org's No. 1 Album of 2010.

== Track listing ==
All songs written by The Menzingers

No.	Title	Length
1.	"Who's Your Partner?"	2:03
2.	"I Was Born"	2:44
3.	"Home Outgrown"	2:46
4.	"Deep Sleep"	2:37
5.	"Time Tables"	3:12
6.	"Male Call"	2:01
7.	"Tasker-Morris Station"	2:03
8.	"So It Goes"	2:23
9.	"No We Didn't"	1:34
10.	"Rivalries"	3:42
11.	"Come Here Often?"	2:07
12.	"Chamberlain Waits"	3:29

== Personnel ==
Personnel for Chamberlain Waits, according to album liner notes.

The Menzingers

- Tom May – Guitar, Vocals
- Joe Godino – Drums
- Greg Barnett – Guitar, Vocals
- Eric Keen - Bass

Guest Musicians

- Brendan Kelly - Additional vocals on "So It Goes"

Production Credits

- Matt Allison – Produced, mixed, and recorded at Atlas Studios
- Justin Yates - Recording assistant
- Alan Douches - Mastered at West West Side Mastering
