= On the Impossible Past =

2012 studio album by The Menzingers

Studio album by the Menzingers
- Released: February 21, 2012
- Recorded: 2011
- Genres: Punk rock; melodic hardcore
- Length: 41:31
- Label: Epitaph
- Producer: Matt Allison

The Menzingers chronology
Chamberlain Waits (2010)	On the Impossible Past (2012)	Rented World (2014)

On the Possible Past

EP by the Menzingers
- Released: February 21, 2012
- Recorded: 2011
- Genre: Acoustic punk
- Length: 22:01
- Label: Epitaph

On the Impossible Past is the third studio album by American punk rock band the Menzingers. It was released by Epitaph Records on February 21, 2012. The album was met with widespread acclaim by music critics, with the aggregating website Metacritic calculating an average score of 93 out of 100.

== Reception ==
=== Critical response ===
Professional ratings
Aggregate scores
Source	Rating
Metacritic	93/100
Review scores
Source	Rating
AllMusic	4/5 stars
AbsolutePunk	9.5/10
Alternative Press	4.5/5 stars
Kerrang!	5/5 stars
Louder than War	8/10
Pitchfork	8.0/10
PopMatters	8/10
Rock Sound	8/10
Sputnikmusic	3.5/5
This Is Fake DIY	8/10

On the Impossible Past garnered critical acclaim upon its release. At Metacritic, which assigns a normalized rating out of 100 to reviews from mainstream music critics, the album received an average score of 93, based on nine reviews, which indicates "universal acclaim". AllMusic writer Gregory Heaney praised its "wryly nostalgic performance, giving a nod to their punk roots as they embrace the rugged earnestness of the Rust Belt with songs about broken hearts, loneliness, and self-doubt." Thomas Nassiff of AbsolutePunk called the album "sweeping, driven, masterful" as he scored it a near-perfect 9.5/10. He confessed that despite "review[ing] albums every week, I just can't seem to fully explain my adoration" for it, before summarizing On the Impossible Past "is an album that should have come out decades ago...this is something that has no expiration date." Steve Lepore of PopMatters called the album "an impeccably crafted melodic hardcore record by a group ready for its close-up." The album also received favorable reviews from the BBC and Exclaim!

=== Accolades ===
Accolades for On the Impossible Past
Publication	Country	Accolade	Rank
AbsolutePunk	United States	AP.net Staff List: Top 30 Albums of 2012	1
Frontier Psychiatrist	United States	The Top 50 Albums of 2012	26
Metacritic	United States	Best Under-the-Radar Releases	2
Punknews	United States	Best of 2012 – Staff Picks	1
Sputnikmusic	United States	Staff's Top 50 Albums of 2012	25
Kerrang!	United Kingdom	The K! Critics' Top 101 Albums of the Year	13
Rock Sound	United Kingdom	The 50 Best Albums of 2012	1
This Is Fake DIY	United Kingdom	DIY Albums of 2012	20
Thrash Hits	United Kingdom	The Thrash Hits Top 20 Albums of 2012	6

== Track listing ==
All songs written, composed and performed by the Menzingers

On the Impossible Past track listing
No.	Title	Length
1.	"Good Things"	2:23
2.	"Burn After Writing"	3:03
3.	"The Obituaries"	3:17
4.	"Gates"	4:04
5.	"Ava House"	3:41
6.	"Sun Hotel"	3:51
7.	"Sculptors and Vandals"	2:10
8.	"Mexican Guitars"	3:08
9.	"On the Impossible Past"	1:33
10.	"Nice Things"	3:28
11.	"Casey"	3:42
12.	"I Can't Seem to Tell"	3:05
13.	"Freedom Bridge"	4:12
Total length:		41:31

== On the Possible Past ==
Pre-orders of the album included a cassette titled On the Possible Past, which contains demos recorded during the winter and spring of 2011. The collection was released on a one time pressing of 1,000 on green vinyl by Epitaph Records.

1. "Good Things" – 2:18
2. "Burn" – 2:15
3. "Ava" – 2:46
4. "Sun Hotel" – 3:51
5. "Sculptors and Vandals" – 2:22
6. "Casey" – 3:18
7. "I Can't Seem to Tell" – 2:33
8. "Freedom Bridge" – 2:38

== Personnel ==
The Menzingers

- Tom May – guitar, vocals
- Joe Godino – drums
- Greg Barnett – guitar, vocals
- Eric Keen – bass guitar
