= Rented World =

Studio album by the Menzingers
- Released: April 22, 2014
- Recorded: 2013
- Genre: Punk rock
- Length: 41:29
- Label: Epitaph
- Producer: Jonathan Low

The Menzingers chronology
On the Impossible Past (2012)	Rented World (2014)	After the Party (2017)

Singles from Rented World
- 1. "In Remission" Released: March 3, 2014; 2. "I Don't Wanna Be An Asshole Anymore" Released: March 31, 2014

Rented World is the fourth studio album by American punk rock band the Menzingers.

== Recording ==
The band entered Miner Street Recordings, the first time the band recorded in Philadelphia, Pennsylvania, in October 2013 with producer Jonathan Low (Venice Sunlight, Restorations).

== Release ==
"In Remission" was released to radio on March 3, 2014. "I Don't Wanna Be an Asshole Anymore" was released to radio on March 31, 2014. Rented World was released through Epitaph Records on April 22, 2014. The band released a music video for "I Don't Wanna Be an Asshole Anymore" on the day the album was released. Between mid-February and early April 2015, the band went on tour with Taking Back Sunday.

== Reception ==
Professional ratings
Aggregate scores
Source	Rating
Metacritic	74/100
Review scores
Source	Rating
AbsolutePunk	9.0/10
AllMusic	4/5 stars
Exclaim!	9/10
PopMatters	7/10

The album was included at number 22 on Rock Sound's "Top 50 Albums of the Year" list. The album was included at number 25 on Kerrang!'s "The Top 50 Rock Albums Of 2014" list.

== Track listing ==
All songs written by the Menzingers

No.	Title	Length
1.	"I Don't Wanna Be an Asshole Anymore"	3:04
2.	"Bad Things"	3:19
3.	"Rodent"	3:18
4.	"Where Your Heartache Exists"	3:35
5.	"My Friend Kyle"	3:17
6.	"Transient Love"	5:06
7.	"The Talk"	2:16
8.	"Nothing Feels Good Anymore"	3:58
9.	"Hearts Unknown"	3:04
10.	"In Remission"	3:42
11.	"Sentimental Physics"	2:47
12.	"When You Died"	4:03

== Personnel ==
The Menzingers

- Tom May – guitar, vocals
- Joe Godino – drums
- Greg Barnett – guitar, vocals
- Eric Keen – bass

== Chart positions ==
Chart (2014)	Peak position
U.S. Billboard Vinyl Albums	1
