= A Lesson in the Abuse of Information Technology =

Studio album by The Menzingers
- Released: July 17, 2007
- Recorded: 2007
- Studios: Cannon Found Soundation Union City, New Jersey
- Genre: Punk rock
- Length: 37:02
- Label: Go-Kart
- Producer: Jesse Cannon

The Menzingers chronology
A Lesson in the Abuse of Information Technology (2007)	Chamberlain Waits (2010)

A Lesson in the Abuse of Information Technology is the debut studio album by American punk rock band The Menzingers. The album was recorded in "like two weeks, maybe just 10 days," according to Barnett. It was released on July 17, 2007 through Go-Kart Records, who they signed to after being featured in a profile piece on Punknews.org. In October and November 2007, they embarked on a tour of the US, which included an appearance at The Fest. They played shows with Young Hearts in February 2008. In June 2008, the band went on a US tour with the Leftovers. They then appeared at The Fest in Florida in October 2008. They played a handful of shows with Captain, We're Sinking in January 2009, and some with Jena Berlin in March 2009.

== Reception ==
Professional ratings
Review scores
Source	Rating
AllMusic	3.5/5 stars
Blogcritics	Favorable
Punknews.org	4/5 stars
Sputnikmusic	4/5

Punknews.org ranked the album at number 14 on their list of the year's 20 best releases.

== Track listing ==
All songs written by The Menzingers except 'Straight to Hell' by The Clash.

No.	Title	Length
1.	"Alpha Kappa Fall off a Balcony"	2:15
2.	"Sir Yes Sir"	3:23
3.	"A Lesson in the Abuse of Information Technology"	2:36
4.	"Ave Maria"	2:56
5.	"Coal City Blues"	2:38
6.	"Keychain"	3:28
7.	"Even for an Eggshell"	3:40
8.	"Richard Coury"	2:16
9.	"Straight to Hell"	4:36
10.	"Victory Gin"	2:59
11.	"Cold Weather Gear"	1:31
12.	"Clap Hands Two Guns"	2:34
13.	"No Ticket"	2:32

== Personnel ==
Personnel for A Lesson in Abuse of Information Technology, according to album liner notes.

The Menzingers

- Tom May – Guitar, Vocals
- Joe Godino – Drums
- Greg Barnett – Guitar, Vocals
- Eric Keen – Bass

Production credits

- Jesse Cannon – Produced, mixed, and recorded at Cannon Found Soundation
- Alan Douches – Mastered at West West Side Mastering
- Evan Hughes – All artwork

Additional engineering by Matt Mesiano and Mike Oettinger
