= 20th Anniversary Series =

EP by the Bouncing Souls
- Released: January–December 2009
- Recorded: 2008
- Genre: Punk rock
- Label: Chunksaah
- Producer: Ted Hutt

The Bouncing Souls chronology
The Gold Record (2006)	20th Anniversary Series (2009)	Ghosts on the Boardwalk (2010)

The 20th Anniversary Series is a series of singles released by the American punk rock band the Bouncing Souls in 2009 to mark the twentieth year of the band's career. Over the course of the year, a total of 16 songs were released by the band's label Chunksaah Records as 7-inch singles and music downloads. The digital singles were released once a month, from January 1 to December 1, with 4 bonus songs being given out at the end of the year to those that purchased a subscription of the singles. The 7-inch EPs were released once every three months, and included 3 of the main songs and 1 bonus song on each. The 12 main songs were collected for a proper album, titled Ghosts on the Boardwalk.

== Digital songs ==
No.	Title	Release date	Length
1.	"Gasoline"	January 1, 2009	4:05
2.	"We All Sing Along"	February 1, 2009	3:50
3.	"Airport Security"	March 1, 2009	3:50
4.	"Dubs Says True"	April 1, 2009	3:31
5.	"I Think That the World"	May 1, 2009	3:02
6.	"Mental Bits"	June 1, 2009	3:14
7.	"Ghosts on the Boardwalk"	July 1, 2009	3:51
8.	"Boogie Woogie Downtown"	August 1, 2009	3:24
9.	"Badass"	September 1, 2009	2:38
10.	"Like the Sun"	October 1, 2009	4:15
11.	"Big Eyes"	November 1, 2009	3:37
12.	"Never Say Die / When You're Young"	December 1, 2009	3:57
Total length:			43:14

Bonus tracks
No.	Title	Length
13.	"A Life Less Ordinary"	3:46
14.	"Gasoline" (demo)	2:43
15.	"Uke Chek Girl"	2:58
16.	"Ghosts on the Boardwalk" (acoustic)	3:41
Total length:		13:08

== 7" EPs ==
=== Volume One ===
Volume One was released in March 2009.

No.	Title	Length
1.	"Gasoline"	4:05
2.	"We All Sing Along"	3:50
3.	"Airport Security"	3:50
4.	"A Life Less Ordinary"	3:41

=== Volume Two ===
Volume Two was released in June 2009.

No.	Title	Length
1.	"Dubs Says True"	3:31
2.	"I Think That the World"	3:02
3.	"Mental Bits"	3:14
4.	"Gasoline" (demo)	2:43

A locked groove lies between tracks 3 and 4.

=== Volume Three ===
Volume Three was released in September 2009.

No.	Title	Length
1.	"Ghosts on the Boardwalk"	3:51
2.	"Boogie Woogie Downtown"	3:24
3.	"Badass"	2:38
4.	"Uke Chek Girl"	2:58

A locked groove lays Between tracks 3 and 4

=== Volume Four ===
Volume Four was released in December 2009.

No.	Title	Length
1.	"Like the Sun"	4:15
2.	"Big Eyes"	3:37
3.	"Never Say Die / When You're Young"	3:57
4.	"Ghosts on the Boardwalk" (acoustic)	3:41

A locked groove lays Between tracks 3 and 4

== Credits ==
- Greg Attonito – vocals
- Pete Steinkopf – guitar
- Bryan Kienlen – bass
- Michael McDermott – drums
