= Ghosts on the Boardwalk =

Studio album by the Bouncing Souls
- Released: January 12, 2010
- Recorded: 2008–2009
- Genre: Punk rock; pop-punk; power pop
- Length: 43:14
- Label: Chunksaah
- Producer: Ted Hutt

The Bouncing Souls chronology
20th Anniversary Series (2009)	Ghosts on the Boardwalk (2010)	Complete Control Recording Sessions (2011)

Singles from Ghosts on the Boardwalk
- 1. "Gasoline" Released: 2009; 2. "Airport Security" Released: March 4, 2009; 3. "Badass" Released: September 3, 2009

Ghosts on the Boardwalk is the eighth studio album from American punk rock band the Bouncing Souls. It was released on Chunksaah Records, the band's own label, on January 12, 2010. This is their first album since The Gold Record (2006) marking the band's longest gap between studio albums. The album features 12 songs which were originally released as digital singles and 7-inch EPs as part of the 20th Anniversary Series. "Gasoline", "Airport Security" and "Badass" were released as singles and music videos.

Professional ratings
Review scores
Source	Rating
Alt Press Magazine	4/5 stars
Consequence of Sound	3.5/5 stars
Punknews.org	3/5 stars
Ultimate Guitar	8.3/10 stars

== Track listing ==
All lyrics are written by Greg Attonito; all music is composed by The Bouncing Souls.

No.	Title	Length
1.	"Gasoline"	4:05
2.	"Never Say Die/When You're Young"	3:57
3.	"I Think That the World"	3:02
4.	"Ghosts on the Boardwalk"	3:51
5.	"Airport Security"	3:50
6.	"Badass"	2:38
7.	"Mental Bits"	3:14
8.	"Dubs Says True"	3:31
9.	"Boogie Woogie Downtown"	3:24
10.	"Big Eyes"	3:37
11.	"We All Sing Along"	3:50
12.	"Like the Sun"	4:15
Total length:		43:14

== Personnel ==
- Greg Attonito – vocals
- Pete Steinkopf – guitar
- Bryan Kienlen – bass
- Michael McDermott – drums
