= Hello Exile =

Studio album by the Menzingers
- Released: October 4, 2019
- Recorded: Spring 2019
- Studio: Studio 4 in Conshohocken, Pennsylvania
- Genres: Heartland rock; punk rock
- Length: 45:55
- Label: Epitaph
- Producer: Will Yip

The Menzingers chronology
After the Party (2017)	Hello Exile (2019)	Some of It Was True (2023)

Singles from Hello Exile
- 1. "Anna" Released: July 15, 2019; 2. "America (You’re Freaking Me Out)" Released: August 20, 2019; 3. "Strangers Forever" Released: September 18, 2019

Hello Exile is the sixth studio album by American punk rock band the Menzingers, released on October 4, 2019, through Epitaph Records. Considered the band’s most musically diverse album to date by critics, the record draws influence from Americana, classic rock, and country music.

== Background and production ==
Unlike previous albums which the band wrote while touring, the band started writing Hello Exile in December 2018 following the end of the After the Party tour. Guitarist and vocalist Greg Barnett decided to write songs about "contemplating how to age gracefully" rather than the "mistakes of adolescence" which much of the songs on their previous records were about. The band intentionally focused much heavier on the inspiration of the classic rock artists that they grew up listening to such as Bruce Springsteen and Tom Petty. While writing the album they "fell in love with songwriting and the idea of how powerful a well constructed song is".

Similar to After the Party, the band hired producer Will Yip and recorded at Studio 4 in Conshohocken, Pennsylvania over the course of six weeks. The album was intentionally an emotionally heavy album for the band focusing on theme of US politics, climate change, loss, long-distance relationships and growing old.

The album's first single "Anna" was released alongside the album's announcement on July 15, 2019. The song was described as "jangle-pop" and "a grand, romantic plea to a significant other who's away too much". It was considered to show the band's evolution from the band's older hard-hitting punk rock style to a more heartland rock-based punk sound.

The second single and opening track of the album, "America (You’re Freaking Me Out)", was written to represent the current American political climate and the "evil" people in charge of the country. Describing the track, Barnett stated "as I was writing that song I realized that it's kind of always freaked me out, especially coming-of-age during the Iraq War. I love so much about America, but I think you can't deny that there are some people in power who are absolutely evil."

The third single "Strangers Forever" was inspired by Leo Tolstoy's novel Anna Karenina. In a statement Barnett said "the idea of becoming a stranger to someone you so intimately know stuck with me and became the overarching narrative to this song".

== Release ==
The album was released in October 2019. Through the beginning of 2020, following the Coronavirus Pandemic, the band spent a few months re-recording 'Hello Exile' from their separate locations into an acoustic version of the album released as 'From Exile' on September 25, 2020.

From Exile was mixed and mastered by Will Yip, the tracks “I Can't Stop Drinking" and "Last to Know" included additional instrumentation performed by Kayleigh Goldsworthy on violin.

== Critical reception ==
Professional ratings
Aggregate scores
Source	Rating
Metacritic	75/100
Review scores
Source	Rating
DIY	4/5 stars
Exclaim!	8/10
Kerrang!	4/5 stars
Paste	8.4/10
Pitchfork	5.8/10
PopMatters	8/10
Sputnikmusic	4/5 stars

Hello Exile received generally positive reviews from music critics. At Metacritic the album received a 75/100 based on 10 critics reviews. Many critics praised the band's songwriting and described it as "poignant and sharp yet delicate and immensely personal." The band were praised for managing to age gracefully on the album and was described as "an honest portrayal of where they are at this point in their life: not ready to settle down and give up the 4 A.M. nights at the dive bar down the street, but also realizing that those around them are in the process of doing so."

== Track listing ==
All tracks are written by the Menzingers.

No.	Title	Length
1.	"America (You're Freaking Me Out)"	3:35
2.	"Anna"	3:29
3.	"High School Friend"	4:26
4.	"Last to Know"	3:53
5.	"Strangers Forever"	3:01
6.	"Hello Exile"	4:26
7.	"Portland"	2:44
8.	"Strain Your Memory"	4:04
9.	"I Can't Stop Drinking"	5:10
10.	"Strawberry Mansion"	3:04
11.	"London Drugs"	3:18
12.	"Farewell Youth"	4:37
Total length:		45:55

== Personnel ==
The Menzingers

- Eric Keen - bass
- Greg Barnett - vocals, guitar
- Joe Godino - drums, percussion
- Tom May - vocals, guitar

Technical personnel

- Will Yip - production, mixing, engineering
- Vince Ratti - mixing
- Ryan Smith - mastering at Sterling Sound, NYC
- Pamela Littky - front cover photo

== Charts ==
Chart (2019)	Peak position
German Albums (Offizielle Top 100)	41
Scottish Albums (Official Charts)	50
UK Independent Albums (OCC)	13
UK Vinyl Albums (OCC)	12
US Billboard 200	89
US Independent Albums (Billboard)	4
US Top Rock Albums (Billboard)	15
