= Crucial Moments =

EP by the Bouncing Souls
- Released: March 15, 2019
- Genre: Punk rock
- Label: Rise Records
- Producer: Will Yip

The Bouncing Souls chronology
Simplicity (2016)	Crucial Moments (2019)	Volume 2 (2020)

Singles from Crucial Moments
- 1. "Crucial Moments" Released: January 22, 2019

Crucial Moments is an EP by the Bouncing Souls that was released on March 15, 2019. The six song EP was released as part of a celebration of the band's 30th anniversary. The band also released a book detailing their history and supported both releases with a world tour. The title track was released as the first single and a music video was also released for the song to promote the EP. The album's title track was released as a single and music video.

== Track listing ==
No.	Title	Length
1.	"Crucial Moments"	2:34
2.	"1989"	1:32
3.	"Favorite Everything"	2:26
4.	"Here's to Us"	3:28
5.	"4th Avenue Sunrise"	1:48
6.	"Home"	3:10

== Personnel ==
- Greg Attonito – vocals
- Pete Steinkopf – guitar
- Bryan Kienlen – bass
- George Rebelo – drums

== Charts ==
Chart (2019)	Peak position
US Heatseekers Albums (Billboard)	3
US Independent Albums (Billboard)	13
