= Calleen Cordero =

American fashion designer

Calleen Cordero is an American footwear and accessories fashion designer from Marin County, California. She is a part of the zero-waste fashion movement.

== Career ==
In 1999, Cordero launched her own collection – Calleen Cordero. During a time when most companies were selling single-sole dress shoes, Cordero launched a collection of leather molded sandals and wooden wedges. The Los Angeles Times would later deem Corderothe 'Queen of Boho' for here leather wedge shoe style. The style would later be popularized after catching the eye of Donna Karan, Martha Stewart, and Oprah Winfrey.

Cordero's company began in 1999 with the creation of hand-sewn garments made from environmentally friendly material. Pieces from her collection are made from 100% organic material and often sewn by hand through a group of artisans. In 2018 Cordero's brand is rooted in the conscious material movement. Donna Karan worked with Cordero on her Urban Zen store in an effort to support philanthropic urban designers. Cordero received further recognition for her brand when her handmade Indian-inspired belts were featured by Oprah amongst her favorite things. Cordero's current collection focuses on footwear, bags, totes, and belts.
