= The Menzingers =

American punk rock band

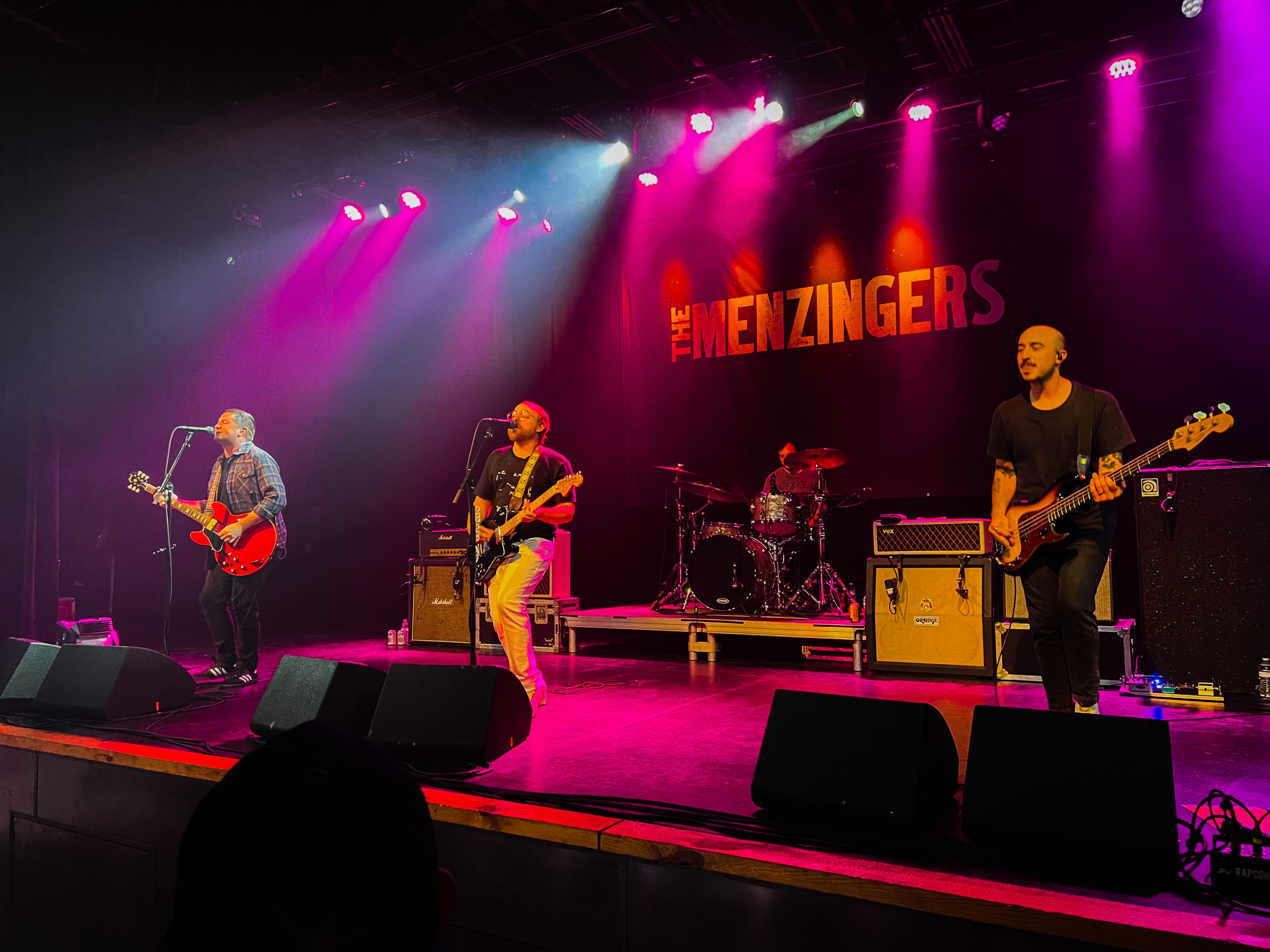
- The Menzingers performing at the Mill & Mine in Knoxville, Tennessee, August 18, 2023. Left to right: Barnett, May, Godino (behind drum kit), and Keen.

Background information
- Origin: Scranton, Pennsylvania, U.S.
- Genre: Punk rock
- Years active: 2006–present
- Labels: Go-Kart, Red Scare, Epitaph
- Members: Greg Barnett; Tom May; Eric Keen; Joe Godino
- Website: Official website

The Menzingers are an American punk rock band from Scranton, Pennsylvania, formed in 2006. The band consists of Greg Barnett (vocals, guitar), Tom May (vocals, guitar), Eric Keen (bass) and Joe Godino (drums). To date, the band has released eight studio albums, with their most recent, Everything I Ever Saw, released on July 17, 2026.

== History ==
The Menzingers formed in the wake of Scranton ska-punk/pop punk bands Bob and the Sagets, featuring Tom May, Joe Godino, Eric Keen, and non-Menzingers members Lee Hartney & Curtis Irie, currently of Irie Idea; and Kos Mos, featuring Greg Barnett, Adam Mcilwee of Tigers Jaw, and Wicca Phase Springs Eternal; and Leo Vergnetti of Captain, We're Sinking. Their first release was a self-titled demo tape made in 2006, which made its way onto many top ten lists of that year.

Their debut full length, A Lesson in the Abuse of Information Technology (released on Go-Kart Records), was produced by Jesse Cannon. According to Cannon, "I record bands every day and almost all of them are missing something. The Menzingers have it all — the songs, the aggression, the heart, and the passion that most only dream of."

In 2009, the band released a four-song EP titled "Hold On Dodge" through Red Scare Industries, their first vinyl release (including a 600-run olive edition). A bonus track for the EP titled "Kentucky Gentleman" is available through iTunes.

Early in 2010, the band did a brief stint with Anti-Flag. April 13 saw the release of their second full-length, Chamberlain Waits, through Red Scare Records. In March and April they also toured in support of Against Me!.

On May 17, 2011, they announced that they had signed to Epitaph Records. Brett Gurewitz, founder of Epitaph Records and guitarist of Bad Religion said this about the signing of the band:
"These guys play the kind of pure punk rock that I grew up with. They are seriously talented songwriters and I'm happy to welcome them to the Epitaph family. I think the band is a great fit here."

They released On the Impossible Past on February 20, 2012, and it was met with critical acclaim. A music video was shot and released for the song "Nice Things."

On the Impossible Past went on to be voted "Album Of The Year" 2012 for both Absolutepunk.net and Punknews.org. It was also voted "Album Of The Year" by RockZone magazine in Spain.

The Menzingers released a split 7-inch EP with The Bouncing Souls in November 2013. Both bands released a new original song on the split, along with a cover of one of the other band's songs. The Menzingers covered "Kate is Great" from The Bouncing Souls, and The Bouncing Souls covered "Burn After Writing" from On the Impossible Past.

On November 29, 2013, while performing at the Bowery Ballroom, Greg Barnett said that the band had just come out of the studio. The new album, Rented World, was released on April 22, 2014. A music video for a song from the new album, "In Remission", was released on February 18, 2014.

The band spent 2014 and 2015 touring North America, Europe, and Australia with a variety of acts as both support and a headline act, including The Smith Street Band, Off With Their Heads, Lemuria, Chumped, Taking Back Sunday, mewithoutYou, Pianos Become the Teeth, letlive., and others.

The Menzingers released their fifth studio album After The Party on February 3, 2017, for Epitaph Records, along with a United States tour featuring Jeff Rosenstock and Rozwell Kid.

On May 30, 2018, The Menzingers released a new single: "Toy Soldier" and released "The Freaks" in October.

The Menzingers announced their sixth studio album Hello Exile and premiered a music video for the single "Anna" on July 15, 2019. On August 20, 2019, The Menzingers released the second single from Hello Exile: "America (You're Freaking Me Out)", alongside a music video. On September 18, 2019, The Menzingers released the third single from Hello Exile: "Strangers Forever", alongside a music video. Hello Exile was released on October 4, 2019, on Epitaph Records and the band went on a U.S. headlining tour with Tigers Jaw and Culture Abuse.

On August 5, 2020, the band announced they would be releasing their 7th album entitled From Exile, which would be an acoustic reimagining of their previous album Hello Exile. The album was written, composed and recorded by the bands members in separate locations due to COVID-19 restrictions. 3 songs, as well as their accompanying lyrics videos, were released ahead of the album premier, with "High School Friend (From Exile)"" and "Strawberry Mansion (From Exile)" released on the same day the album was announced, and "Last To Know (From Exile)" was released on August 21, 2020. The full album was released on September 25, 2020.

In a podcast shared on their Patreon in late 2021, the band recounted a significant moment from their tour when Bill Stevenson offered them high praise, stating, "You know what guys, you're a real band."

In September 2022, The Menzingers announced a reissue of On the Impossible Past and its demos On the Possible Past both digitally and on vinyl for the 10 year anniversary. This announcement was accompanied with the release of the single "Burn".

In March 2023, The Menzingers released the single "Bad Actors" followed in July 2023 by the single "There's No Place in This World for Me." The latter would feature on the band's seventh studio album Some of It Was True, released on October 13, 2023.

In April 19, 2026, the band announced the single "Chance Encounters" and their eight studio album Everything I Ever Saw, to be released on July 17 of the same year.

== Musical style ==
Critics and journalists have labeled the Menzingers' musical style as punk rock. In interviews, members of the band have self-described the Menzingers as a punk band. The Menzingers have cited numerous bands as influences, including the Clash, Against Me!, Pixies, and the Smashing Pumpkins.

== Accolades ==
| Publication | Rank | List |
|---|---|---|
| Loudwire | Unranked | The 50 Best Rock Albums of 2019 (for Hello Exile) |
| Stereogum | 26 | 50 Best Albums of 2017 So Far |
| Uproxx | 46 | 50 Best Albums of 2017 So Far |

== Members ==
- Greg Barnett – guitar, vocals
- Tom May – guitar, vocals
- Eric Keen – bass guitar
- Joe Godino – drums

== Discography ==
=== Studio albums ===
- A Lesson in the Abuse of Information Technology (2007)
- Chamberlain Waits (2010)
- On the Impossible Past (2012)
- Rented World (2014)
- After the Party (2017)
- Hello Exile (2019)
- Some of It Was True (2023)
- Everything I Ever Saw (2026)

=== EPs and singles ===
- Hold on, Dodge! (2009)
- "I Was Born" (2010)
- "The Obituaries" (2011)
- "Gates" (2012)
- Electric Split (2013) (split with The Bouncing Souls)
- Dirty Old Town / Whiskey in the Jar (2016)
- "Lookers" (2016)
- Covers EP (2017)
- "Toy Soldier" (2018)
- "The Freaks" (2018)
- "No Penance b/w Cemetery's Garden" (2019)
- "Anna" (2019)
- "America (You're Freaking Me Out)" (2019)
- "Strangers Forever" (2019)
- “Bad Actors” (2023)
- "There's No Place in This World for Me" (2023)
- "Nobody's Heroes" (2026)

=== Demos ===
- Demo (2006)
- On the Possible Past (2012) - re-released in 2022

=== Music videos ===
- "Richard Coury" (2008)
- "I Was Born" (2010)
- "Irish Goodbyes" (2011)
- "Nice Things" (2012)
- "In Remission" (2014)
- "I Don't Wanna Be an Asshole Anymore" (2014)
- "Where Your Heartache Exists" (2015)
- "Bad Catholics" (2016)
- "Lookers" (2016)
- "After the Party" (2017)
- "The Freaks" (2018)
- "Anna" (2019)
- "America (You're Freaking Me Out)" (2019)
- "Strangers Forever" (2019)
- "There's No Place in This World for Me" (2023)
- "Hope is a Dangerous Little Thing" (2023)
- "Come On Heartache" (2023)
- "Try" (2023)
- "Some of It Was True" (2023)
- "Chance Encounters" (2026)
