= The Good, the Bad, and the Argyle =

Studio album by the Bouncing Souls
- Released: November 1, 1994
- Recorded: 1994
- Genre: Pop-punk
- Length: 31:18
- Labels: Chunksaah; BYO
- Producer: The Bouncing Souls

The Bouncing Souls chronology
The Good, the Bad, and the Argyle (1994)	Maniacal Laughter (1995)

Singles from The Good, the Bad, and the Argyle
- 1. "Neurotic" Released: 1994; 2. "Joe Lies (When He Cries)" Released: 1994

Professional ratings
Review scores
Source	Rating
Allmusic	4/5 stars

The Good, the Bad, and the Argyle is the debut full-length release by American punk rock band the Bouncing Souls. Released on November 1, 1994, the album runs 31 minutes and 18 seconds, and has 12 songs including covers of The Strangeloves' "I Want Candy," which was renamed to just "Candy", and The Waitresses' "I Know What Boys Like."

== Background ==
The album got its title from the fact that some of the tracks were taken from EPs that the band released prior to the release of the full length. These 7" include Neurotic and Argyle. The song title "Lay 'Em Down And Smack 'Em, Yack 'Em" comes from the jive conversation in the movie Airplane!. The song "These Are The Quotes From Our Favorite 80s Movies" contains quotes from various 80s movies, like Valley Girl, The Breakfast Club, Better Off Dead, Some Kind of Wonderful, Rambo: First Blood Part II, and Say Anything....

== Track listing ==
All songs written by the Bouncing Souls except where noted.

1. "I Like Your Mom" – 0:47
2. "The Guest" – 2:16
3. "These Are the Quotes from Our Favorite 80'S Movies" – 1:57
4. "Joe Lies (When He Cries)" – 3:50
5. "Some Kind of Wonderful" – 2:35
6. "Lay 'Em Down and Smack 'Em, Yack 'Em" – 1:38
7. "Old School" – 3:48
8. "Candy" (Bob Feldman, Jerry Goldstein, Richard Gottehrer) – 2:36
9. "Neurotic" – 2:54
10. "Inspection Station" – 1:56
11. "Deadbeats" – 2:42
12. "I Know What Boys Like" (Chris Butler) – 3:15

== Personnel ==
- Greg Attonito – vocals
- Pete Steinkopf – guitar
- Bryan Keinlen – bass, artwork
- Shal Khichi – drums
- Jeffrey Riedmiller – engineer
