= How I Spent My Summer Vacation (album) =

Studio album by the Bouncing Souls
- Released: May 22, 2001
- Recorded: November 2000 – March 2001
- Studio: Westbeach Recorders in Los Angeles
- Genres: Skate punk; melodic hardcore
- Length: 34:16
- Label: Epitaph
- Producers: John Seymour, Bryan Kienlen, Pete Steinkopf

The Bouncing Souls chronology
Hopeless Romantic (1999)	How I Spent My Summer Vacation (2001)	BYO Split Series, Vol. 4 (2002)

Singles from How I Spent My Summer Vacation
- 1. "True Believers" Released: 2001; 2. "Gone" Released: 2001

How I Spent My Summer Vacation is the fifth studio album by American punk rock band the Bouncing Souls. It was recorded in November and December 2000. It was released on May 22, 2001. This was the first album to feature new drummer Michael McDermott, formerly of Murphy's Law and Skinnerbox. The song "Manthem" is featured in the video game Tony Hawk's Pro Skater 4. "True Believers" and "Gone" were released as singles and music videos.

== Release ==
On February 28, 2001, "True Believers" and the music video for "Here We Go" was posted on the band's website. The band was due to support Green Day on their tour of Japan in March; however, due to an illness in drummer Michael McDermott's family, the band pulled out. In early May 2001, the band filmed a music video for "Gone". How I Spent My Summer Vacation was released in May 2001, through Epitaph Records. In May and June 2001, the band toured Europe as part of the Deconstruction Tour. In August 2001, the band filmed a music video for "True Believers" at CBGB in New York City. In February and March 2002, the band went on tours of the west and east coasts; Alkaline Trio supported on the west coast dates, while the Pietasters, Strike Anywhere, the Arsons, and the Unseen supported the east coast shows.

== Reception ==
Professional ratings
Review scores
Source	Rating
AllMusic	4/5 stars

Cleveland.com ranked "True Believers" at number 57 on their list of the top 100 pop-punk songs. Alternative Press ranked "True Believers" at number 50 on their list of the best 100 singles from the 2000s.

== Track listing ==
All songs by The Bouncing Souls

1. "That Song" – 2:03
2. "Private Radio" – 2:13
3. "True Believers" – 2:31
4. "Better Life" – 1:50
5. "The Something Special" – 3:25
6. "Broken Record" – 2:50
7. "Lifetime" – 3:22
8. "Manthem" – 3:08
9. "Break-up Song" – 1:52
10. "Streetlight Serenade (to No One)" – 2:04
11. "Late Bloomer" – 2:48
12. "No Comply" – 1:58
13. "Gone" – 4:07

== Personnel ==
- Greg Attonito – vocals
- Pete Steinkopf – guitar
- Bryan Keinlen – bass guitar, artwork
- Michael McDermott – drums
- John Seymour – engineer
- Jonathon Leary – assistant engineer
- Tim Gilles – technician
- Robert Vosgien – technician
