= Maniacal Laughter =

Studio album by the Bouncing Souls
- Released: January 26, 1996
- Recorded: 1995
- Genres: Punk rock; oi!
- Length: 23:44
- Labels: Chunksaah Records; BYO Records
- Producer: Thom Wilson

The Bouncing Souls chronology
The Good, the Bad, and the Argyle (1994)	Maniacal Laughter (1996)	The Bouncing Souls (1997)

Singles from Maniacal Laughter
- 1. "Here We Go" Released: 1996; 2. "The Ballad of Johnny X" Released: 1996

Professional ratings
Review scores
Source	Rating
Allmusic	4/5 stars

Maniacal Laughter is the Bouncing Souls' second full-length album, which includes "Here We Go" and "The Ballad Of Johnny X. The album also contains a cover of "Born to Lose," which was originally performed by Ted Daffan. "Lamar Vannoy" is included in the opening sequence of Larry Clark's controversial 2002 film Ken Park.

== Track listing ==
All songs written by the Bouncing Souls except where noted.

1. "Lamar Vannoy" – 3:04
2. "No Rules" – 1:10
3. "The Freaks, Nerds, and Romantics" – 2:32
4. "Argyle" – 2:35
5. "All of This and Nothing" – 0:55
6. "The BMX Song" – 1:57
7. "Quick Chek Girl" – 2:52
8. "Headlights.... Ditch!" – 0:43
9. "Here We Go" – 1:58
10. "Born to Lose" (Frankie Brown, Ted Daffan) – 2:07
11. "Moon Over Asbury" – 1:45
12. "The Ballad of Johnny X" (Johnny X, The Bouncing Souls) – 2:06

== Personnel ==
- Greg Attonito – vocals
- Pete Steinkopf – guitar
- Bryan Keinlen – bass, artwork
- Shal Khichi – drums
- Thom Wilson – engineer
- Andy VanDette – technician
- Johnny X – guitar and vocals on "The Ballad of Johnny X"
