= Hopeless Romantic (The Bouncing Souls album) =

Studio album by the Bouncing Souls
- Released: May 4, 1999
- Recorded: 1999
- Genres: Punk rock; pop-punk
- Length: 39:58
- Label: Epitaph
- Producer: Thom Wilson

The Bouncing Souls chronology
Tie One On (1998)	Hopeless Romantic (1999)	How I Spent My Summer Vacation (2001)

Singles from Hopeless Romantic
- 1. "Fight to Live" Released: 1999; 2. "¡Olé!" Released: 1999

Hopeless Romantic is the fourth full-length studio album by American punk rock band the Bouncing Souls. It was released in 1999 on Epitaph. The album finds the band experimenting with tempos and genres, all while maintaining the energetic punk sound of their previous albums. Hopeless Romantic contained the singles "Fight to Live" and "¡Olé!" along with fan favorites like "Kid" and the ballad "Night on Earth."

== Release ==
Hopeless Romantic was released in May 1999. The Bouncing Souls toured with H_{2}O, Vision, and the Casualties on the east coast in November and December 1999. Drummer Shal Khich left the band in January 2000. Towards the end of the year, the band supported Green Day in Europe.

== Reception ==
Professional ratings
Review scores
Source	Rating
AllMusic	3/5 stars

The album was included at number 31 on Rock Sound's "The 51 Most Essential Pop Punk Albums of All Time" list.

== Track listing ==
All tracks by the Bouncing Souls except where noted.

1. "Hopeless Romantic" – 2:12
2. "'87" – 3:27
3. "Kid" – 2:50
4. "Fight to Live" – 2:58
5. "Bullying the Jukebox" – 3:48
6. "You're So Rad" – 1:19
7. "Night on Earth" – 4:54
8. "Monday Morning Ant Brigade" – 2:24
9. "¡Olé!" (Armath, J. Deja, the Bouncing Souls) – 3:04
10. "Undeniable" – 2:37
11. "Wish Me Well (You Can Go to Hell)" – 2:56
12. "It's Not the Heat, It's the Humanity" – 2:14
13. "The Whole Thing" – 5:13

== Trivia ==
- The song "Kid" contains a reference to the 1980s movie "The Breakfast Club"
- "¡Olé!" was the theme music for professional wrestler El Generico before he was signed to WWE. It was also used as an entrance theme for Former AEW, Current WWE wrestler, CM Punk in his indies days. It was used as a goal song for the New Jersey Devils in the 2006-07 season, which was the final season that they played at the Meadowlands Arena before moving to Prudential Center the following season. The song was also used for the Vancouver Canucks as a goal song in the 2002–03, 2005–06, and 2006–07 seasons, then the Quebec Remparts of the QMJHL, and later appeared in NHL 11. This song is also popular among Montreal Canadiens fans.
- Seminal Australian punk radio show Bullying The Jukebox takes its title from track 5 of the disc.
- The song "Fight to Live" was featured on the CD-ROM of the Pocket PC Jornada series 500 from Hewlett-Packard, it was an mp3 file.

== Personnel ==
- Greg Attonito – vocals
- Pete Steinkopf – guitar
- Bryan Keinlen – bass, artwork
- Shal Khichi – drums
- Kara Weathington – vocals on "Wish Me Well (You Can Go To Hell)"
- Thom Wilson – engineer
- Chris Manning – assistant engineer
- Eddy Shreyer – technician
