= The Gold Record =

Studio album by the Bouncing Souls
- Released: June 6, 2006
- Recorded: January 2006
- Genres: Punk rock; pop-punk; melodic hardcore
- Length: 44:24
- Label: Epitaph
- Producer: Ted Hutt

The Bouncing Souls chronology
Anchors Aweigh (2003)	The Gold Record (2006)	20th Anniversary Series (2009)

Singles from The Gold Record
- 1. "The Pizza Song" Released: October 12, 2006; 2. "Lean on Sheena" Released: May 23, 2007

Professional ratings
Review scores
Source	Rating
AllMusic	4.5/5 stars
thepunksite.com	4.5/5 stars
The A.V. Club	B+
Slant Magazine	3.5/5 stars
PopMatters	7/10

The Gold Record is the seventh studio album by American punk rock band the Bouncing Souls and was released on June 6, 2006. The band deemed this release to be 'the release of the beast' in reference to the date (6/6/06) being similar to the number of the beast (666).

The album includes two covers, of "Lean on Sheena" by Avoid One Thing and "Better Things" by the Kinks. "Letter from Iraq" is based on a poem sent to the band by Garett Reppenhagen, a soldier serving in Iraq.

"The Pizza Song" and "Lean on Sheena" were released as singles and music videos.

== Release ==
On February 9, 2006, the Bouncing Souls' next album was announced for release in four months' time. In March and April 2005, they went on tours of Japan (with Street Dogs), New Zealand, and Australia. The album's track listing was posted online on April 11, 2006, followed by the artwork and album's title nine days later. On April 25, 2006, "The Gold Song" was made available for free download through Epitaph Records' website; "The Pizza Song" followed on May 23, 2006. On June 2, 2006, The Gold Record was made available for streaming through Warped Tour's website, ahead of its release four days later through Epitaph Records. Leading up to this, the band held a week-long series of shows at the Knitting Factory in New York City. On June 19, 2006, a music video was released for "The Pizza Song". They promoted the album by touring on the entirety of the 2006 Warped Tour; on August 8, 2006, the album was released as a vinyl picture disc on their own label Chunksaah Records.

Between October and December 2006, the band embarked on their headlining US tour, dubbed Gold Tour. They were supported by Street Dogs, Whole Wheat Bread, the World/Inferno Friendship Society, and Left Alone. In January 2007, the Bouncing Souls performed at a special event marking a Warped Tour exhibition at the Rock and Roll Hall of Fame. In February 2007, they went on a tour of the UK with the Draft. On March 30, 2007, the music video for "Lean on Sheena" was posted online. In April and May 2007, the band embarked on a Canadian tour with Strike Anywhere, the Loved Ones, and Static Radio. In May and June 2007, the Bouncing Souls played three shows in Japan, and performed four US East Coast shows, which included an appearance at the School of Rock Festival.

In September 2007, the band appeared at the Bumbershoot festival, and went on a short East Coast tour the following month with Modern Life Is War, the World/Inferno Friendship Society, and the Low Budgets. They ended the year with a tour of Australia in November and December 2007, and a trio of holiday shows at The Stone Pony in Asbury Park, New Jersey. For the three shows, the band played 60 different tracks from their catalogue. Bookending appearances at the Bamboozle Left and The Bamboozle festivals, the band went on a short US tour in April 2008 with Dead to Me, Static Radio NJ, Tim Barry, and the Gaslight Anthem. Following this, the band appeared on Warped Tour again for two weeks in July 2008, and went on a short tour in September 2008. They then appeared at Riot Fest in October 2008, and played a handful of shows with Strike Anywhere, the Casting One, Gimme Drugs, Youth Brigade, Kevin Seconds, and Nothington. They ended the year with a performance at Fun Fun Fun Fest.

== Track listing ==
All tracks are written by Greg Attonito, Pete Steinkopf, Bryan Kienlen, and Michael McDermott, except where noted.

The Gold Record
No.	Title	Writer(s)	Length
1.	"The Gold Song"		3:16
2.	"So Jersey"		4:01
3.	"Sounds of the City"		2:42
4.	"The Pizza Song"		3:43
5.	"Sarah Saturday"		3:46
6.	"Better Things" (The Kinks cover)	Ray Davies	3:27
7.	"The Messenger"		4:20
8.	"Lean on Sheena" (Avoid One Thing cover)	Joe Gittleman	3:20
9.	"Letter from Iraq"	The Bouncing Souls, Garett Reppenhagen	2:57
10.	"The New Thing"		3:11
11.	"Midnight Mile"		2:52
12.	"For All the Unheard"		6:49
Total length:			44:24

== Personnel ==
The Bouncing Souls

- Greg Attonito – vocals, harmonica
- Pete Steinkopf – guitar
- Bryan Kienlen – bass guitar, backing vocals
- Michael McDermott – drums

Additional musicians

- Jeff Abarta, Ted Hutt, Johnny Madcap, Ace Von Johnson & Chuck Ragan – backing vocals
- Rami Jaffee – accordion, keyboards

Artwork

- Bryan Kienlen – artwork, layout design, photography

Production

- Ted Hutt – producer
- Tom Baker – mastering
- Ryan Mall – engineer

== Charts ==
Chart (2006)	Peak position
US Billboard 200	141
Top Heatseekers	5
Top Independent Albums	10
