= The Bouncing Souls (album) =

Studio album by the Bouncing Souls
- Released: September 23, 1997
- Recorded: 1997
- Genre: Punk rock; pop-punk
- Length: 26:02
- Label: Epitaph Records
- Producer: Thom Wilson

The Bouncing Souls chronology
Maniacal Laughter (1996)	The Bouncing Souls (1997)	Tie One On (1998)

Singles from The Bouncing Souls
- 1. "East Side Mags" Released: 1997

Professional ratings
Review scores
Source	Rating
Allmusic	3/5 stars

The Bouncing Souls is the third full-length album by American punk rock band the Bouncing Souls, and was released by Epitaph Records.

== Track listing ==
All songs by the Bouncing Souls.

1. "Cracked" – 1:56
2. "Say Anything" – 1:16
3. "Kate Is Great" – 2:54
4. "Low Life" – 1:16
5. "Chunksong" (Timmy Chunks, The Bouncing Souls) – 1:08
6. "East Side Mags" – 1:06
7. "The Toilet Song" – 1:23
8. "Single Successful Guy" – 1:58
9. "Whatever I Want (Whatever That Is)" – 1:23
10. "Serenity" – 2:25
11. "Party at 174" – 1:53
12. "Holiday Cocktail Lounge" – 2:01
13. "The Screamer" – 1:57
14. "East Coast! Fuck You!" – 1:01
15. "I Like Your Eyes" – 1:02
16. "Shark Attack" – 1:22

== Personnel ==
- Greg Attonito – vocals
- Pete Steinkopf – guitar, backing vocals
- Bryan Keinlen – bass, backing vocals, artwork
- Shal Khichi – drums
- Thom Wilson – engineer
- Mike Ainsworth – assistant engineer
- Eddy Shreyer – technician
