= Pete Steinkopf =

American songwriter

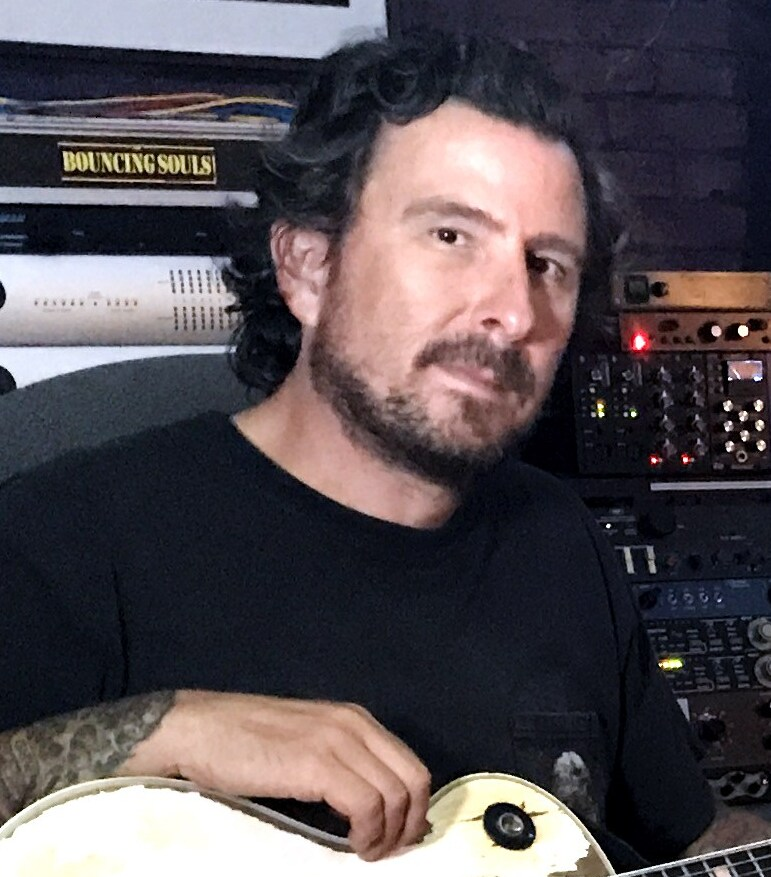
Steinkopf in 2017

Pete Steinkopf is an American guitarist, songwriter and music producer who is a founder of the punk rock band The Bouncing Souls.

== Career ==
Steinkopf founded The Bouncing Souls in New Brunswick, New Jersey in 1989. Since that time, the band released ten studio albums, two live albums, one compilation album, nine ep/singles and eight split releases. In 2010, with the Build & Burn album from The Loved Ones, Steinkopf began his career in producing and engineering albums. Since then, he has worked with Brian Fallon of The Gaslight Anthem, Dave Hause, Beach Slang, Nathan Gray of Boy Sets Fire and The Menzingers.

Steinkopf primarily works out of his studio, Little Eden, as well as The Lake House studio, both in Asbury Park, New Jersey.

== Discography ==
Band	Album	Label	Credit	Year
Bouncing Souls	The Good the Bad and The Argyle	BYO Records	Guitarist, Writer	1994
Bouncing Souls	Maniacal Laughter	BYO Records	Guitarist, Writer	1996
Bouncing Souls	Self Titled	Epitaph Records	Guitarist, Writer	1997
Bouncing Souls	Hopeless Romantic	Epitaph Records	Guitarist, Writer	1999
Bouncing Souls	How I Spent My Summer vacation	Epitaph Records	Guitarist, Writer, Producer	2001
Bouncing Souls	Anchors Aweigh	Epitaph Recirds	Guitarist, Writer, Producer	2003
Hot Water Music	The New What's Next	Epitaph Records	Guitarist	2004
Bouncing Souls	Live	Chunksaah Records	Guitarist, Writer, Producer	2005
Bouncing Souls	The Gold Record	Epitaph Records	Guitarist, Writer	2006
The Loved Ones	Build and Burn	Fat wreck Chords	Producer, guitarist	2007
Bouncing Souls	Ghosts On The Boardwalk	Chunksaah Records	Guitarist, Writer	2009
Detournament	Awaken With Millions	Pirates Press	Producer, engineer, mixer	2009
Loved Ones	Distractions	Fat Wreck Chords	Producer, engineer, mixer	2009
Lenny Lashleys Gang Of One	Viva Rock N Roll	Hold Fast Records	Producer, Engineer, Mixer, Guitarist	2010
Dirty Tacticts	The Divine Muddle	Kiss Of Death	Producer, engineer	2010
Dave Hause	Resolutions	Rise Records	Producer, engineer, mixer, Guitarist, K	2011
Brian Fallon	Revival Tour Collection	Ten Four Records	Producer, engineer, mixer, Guitarist	2011
Houseboat	21st Century Breakroom	Bloated Cat Records	Producer, engineer, mixer	2011
Bouncing Souls	Comet	Rise Records	Guitarist, Writer	2012
Luther	Let's Get You Somewhere Else	Chunksaah Records	Producer, Engineer, Mixer	2012
Dave Hause	7 inch Series	Jade tree/SideOneDummy/Bridge 9	Producer, engineer, mixer	2012
The Scandals	Trench Knife	Gongervitus Records	Producer, engineer, mixer	2012
Born Annoying	Living How Yoire Not	Reaper Records	Producer, engineer, mixer	2012
Organ Thieves	ST	Independent	Producer, engineer, mixer	2013
The Battery Electric	Weaving Spiders	Little Dickman	Producer, engineer, mixer	2013
Menzingers	Shocking	Chunksaah records	Producer, engineer, mixer	2013
Lenny Lashleys Gang Of One	Illuminator	Pirates Press Records	Producer, engineer, mixer, Guitarist, /B/K	2013
TwoPointEight	From Wires	I Scream Records	Mixer, engineer, guitarist	2014
Smalltalk	Plus!	Chunksaah Records	Engineer, mixer, producer, Guitarist, Writer	2014
Sammy Kay	Fourth Street Singers	Panic State	Engineer, Mixer, Producer, Guitarist, Writer, K/B	2015
Northcote	Invisible Diamonds	Xtra mile Recordings	Producer, engineer, mixer	2015
Brian McGee	Ruin Creek	Creep Records	Producer, engineer, mixer, Guitarist	2015
Morningside Lane	Mellow Drama	Super Sick Records	Producer, engineer, mixer	2015
Battery Electric	The Heart And The Thrill	Little Dickman	Producer, engineer, mixer	2015
Vansaders	Jumping At Shadows	Independent	Producer, engineer, mixer	2015
Local Summer	Cheery Vaneer	Independent	Producer, Engineer, Mixer, Guitarist	2015
Protagonist	Jean Jackets In June	Smart Punk	Producer, Engineer	2015
The Moms	Snow Bird	Bar None Records	Producer, engineer, mixer	2016
Almost People	Songs For Best Friends	Anchorless	Producer, engineer, mixer	2016
Plow United	Three	It's Alive Records	Producer, engineer, mixer	2016
Up For Nothing	Swindled	It's Alive Records	Producer, engineer, mixer	2016
The Attack	On Condition	Paper and Plastik	Producer, engineer, mixer	2016
Lost In Society	Modern Illusions	Handsome Stranger	Producer, engineer, mixer	2016
Beach Slang	I Made This For You	Polyvinyl	Producer, engineer, mixer	2017
Seaside Caves	Hope	Chunksaah Records	Producer, engineer, mixer	2017
Vansaders	No Matter What	Independent	Producer, engineer, mixer	2017
Vansaders	This Time Around	Independent	Producer, engineer, mixer	2017
Hot Blood	Overcome part 1		Producer, engineer, mixer	2015
Hot Blood	Overcome Part 2		Producer, engineer, mixer	2016
Nathan Gray	Feral Hyms	End Hit Records	Producer, engineer, mixer, Guitarist	2018
The Ratchets	First Light	Pirates Press	Producer, engineer, mixer	2018
Bouncing Souls	Simplicity	Rise Records	Guitarist, Writer	2018
Crazy & The Brains	Out In The Weez	Hovercraft Records	Producer, engineer, mixer	2018
Dylan Disaster and The Revelry	All Roads	Travel Well Records	Producer, engineer, mixer	2023
