= Chunksaah Records =

American independent record label

- Founded: 1993
- Founder: The Bouncing Souls
- Distributor: Independent Label Distribution
- Genre: Punk rock
- Country of origin: United States
- Location: Asbury Park, New Jersey
- Official website: chunksaah.com

Chunksaah Records is an American independent record label founded in 1993 by The Bouncing Souls. The label started as a means for the band to release their own recordings, but ended up releasing material by other punk bands, mostly from the New Jersey area, as well. It is named after a benefactor, Timmy Chunks.

The label issues new material and vinyl re-releases. For example, The Bouncing Souls' The Gold Record was released on CD by Epitaph Records but Chunksaah released the vinyl album.
