= The Bouncing Souls =

American punk band

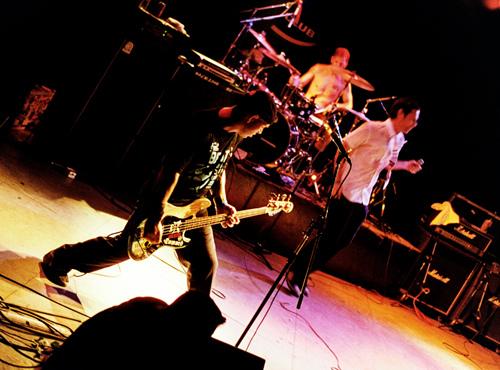
- The Bouncing Souls performing on February 16, 2009, in Rosario, Argentina.

Background information
- Origin: New Brunswick, New Jersey, U.S.
- Genres: Punk rock; pop-punk; skate punk; hardcore punk
- Works: Discography
- Years active: 1989–present
- Labels: Rise, Chunksaah, Epitaph, BYO, Pure Noise
- Members: Greg Attonito; Pete Steinkopf; Bryan Kienlen; George Rebelo
- Past members: Shal Khichi; Michael McDermott
- Website: bouncingsouls.com

The Bouncing Souls are an American punk rock band from New Brunswick, New Jersey, formed in 1989. By the time of their acknowledgment by the national punk rock scene, they had reignited a "pogo" element to New Jersey punk rock by playing fast light-hearted songs, a model followed by various other local bands.

== History ==
The four original members grew up in Basking Ridge, New Jersey, and played in smaller bands while attending Ridge High School. Although they decided to forgo college, they made the decision to move to a college town; New Brunswick, NJ, which is the home of Rutgers University. New Brunswick had a reputation for supporting underground music, and over the years had seen not only musical acts but actors enjoy professional success. The Bouncing Souls not only became a staple in the New Brunswick music scene, but also helped other bands gain an audience by opening up for them in the clubs around town, as well as parties and shows they put on themselves. The band's name is a derivative of Doc Martens shoes, specifically their advertising slogan "with Bouncing Soles". Doctor Martens air-cushioned soles are a staple of punk dress.

Their first full-length album, The Good, The Bad & The Argyle, was released in 1994 on Chunksaah Records, their own label. The album was a compilation of several EPs the band had released previously. Two tracks of this record, "Candy" (popularized by the Strangeloves and covered by many other groups) and "What Boys Like" (originally by the Waitresses) served as homage to 1980s new wave while simultaneously striking a humorous jab at homophobia. Their next album, Maniacal Laughter, was released in 1996. Half the album was written in a week. It led to a high-profile tour with Youth Brigade that got the attention of Epitaph Records.

The Bouncing Souls signed with Epitaph in 1997 and released The Bouncing Souls later that year. While it contains some Bouncing Souls classics like "Cracked", "Kate is Great", and "East Coast Fuck You!", certain tracks on the record were considered disappointing by fans in comparison to their lo-fi earlier recordings. Greg himself stated on Do You Remember? 15 Years of the Bouncing Souls that "It's a CD of unfinished songs". Hopeless Romantic followed in 1999. Hopeless Romantic has been heralded for admixing poignant lyrics with their melodic rapidly paced punk style. Soon after the album's release, personal problems arose between the band and long-time drummer Shal Khichi which resulted in his departure from the band. He was replaced by former Skinnerbox, Mephiskapheles, and Murphy's Law drummer, Michael McDermott.

How I Spent My Summer Vacation was the first album released with the new line-up. By now, the band had become viewed as seminal to the modern punk sound, with a new generation of fans discovering their earlier releases as they toured with newer bands as well as larger punk acts such as Hot Water Music. 2002 brought a b-sides album, The Bad, the Worse, and the Out of Print, and an acclaimed split with Anti-Flag as part of the BYO Split Series. In 2003, the band released their sixth album Anchors Aweigh, as well as their first DVD, Do You Remember? 15 Years of the Bouncing Souls. In 2005, they had two live releases, a double CD album, simply titled Live, as well as a DVD, titled Live at the Glasshouse, which was the 19th entry in Kung Fu Films' The Show Must Go Off! series. The band released their seventh album, The Gold Record, on June 6, 2006, or 6/6/06, which the band has called "The release of the beast", in reference to 666, which is known as the "number of the beast". Also, due to their first full-length record being a collection of previous releases, many fans also consider this to in fact be their sixth studio album, and thus 666 is also partly in reference to this. They then headed out on the 2006 Warped Tour in support of the record, and again three years later, in 2009.

In 2008, while at the Vans Warped Tour stop in their home state of New Jersey, the band helped Music Saves Lives raise the blood supply by signing a guitar for the non-profit to auction off.

In 2009, the band released a series of sixteen digital songs and four 7-inch EPs as part of the 20th Anniversary Series. Twelve of these songs were being released into an album titled Ghosts on the Boardwalk which was released on January 12, 2010. In 2011, the band was the first to be featured on SideOneDummy's The Complete Control Sessions series of live recordings. The band's contribution to the series features six songs, one of which is a Misfits cover.

The Bouncing Souls released their ninth studio album, Comet on June 12, 2012, via Rise Records, their first album for that label. The artwork and track listing was released on March 12, 2012, along with the album's third track, "Static," which is available to be streamed online.

On 25 June 2013, the Bouncing Souls confirmed that drummer Michael McDermott would be leaving the band in order to 'pursue other musical interests'. The band later added they don't know what's next for them, whilst suggesting the remaining members will continue performing in the band. McDermott would later join Joan Jett & the Blackhearts.

On September 26, 2013, George Rebelo of Hot Water Music and Against Me! officially joined the band as the new drummer during a secret show at Asbury Lanes.

The band released their tenth studio album, Simplicity on July 29, 2016. On March 15, 2019, the band released the six-song Crucial Moments EP along with a new book to celebrate the band's 30th anniversary.

On October 23, 2020, the Bouncing Souls released their eleventh studio album, Volume 2. The album contains songs from their previous records re-recorded in new styles, along with a new song, "World on Fire."

The band released their twelfth studio album, Ten Stories High, on March 24, 2023.On April 22, 2025, the band released the single and music video for a new song called "United".On September 19, 2025, they released the single and music video for a new song called "Power" and the following day on social media announced that more new music was on the way in 2026.

The band announced that their thirteenth album, Born to Be, will be released on June 26, 2026. The band previewed the album by releasing "The Light" as the album's first single on April 14, 2026 and the second single, "Only Echoes", on May 29, 2026. The album will also feature the previously released songs "United" and "Power". The band will support the album with a tour featuring the Suicide Machines that will begin in June 2026 and end in February 2027.

== Members ==
Current

- Greg Attonito – vocals (1989–present)
- Pete Steinkopf – guitar (1989–present)
- Bryan Kienlen – bass (1989–present)
- George Rebelo – drums (2013–present)

Former

- Shal Khichi – drums (1989–2000)
- Michael McDermott – drums (2000–2013, has occasionally joined the band to play a few songs at shows since his departure)

== Discography ==
Studio albums

- The Good, the Bad, and the Argyle (1994)
- Maniacal Laughter (1996)
- The Bouncing Souls (1997)
- Hopeless Romantic (1999)
- How I Spent My Summer Vacation (2001)
- Anchors Aweigh (2003)
- The Gold Record (2006)
- Ghosts on the Boardwalk (2010)
- Comet (2012)
- Simplicity (2016)
- Volume 2 (2020)
- Ten Stories High (2023)
- Born to Be (2026)
