= Zebrahead discography =

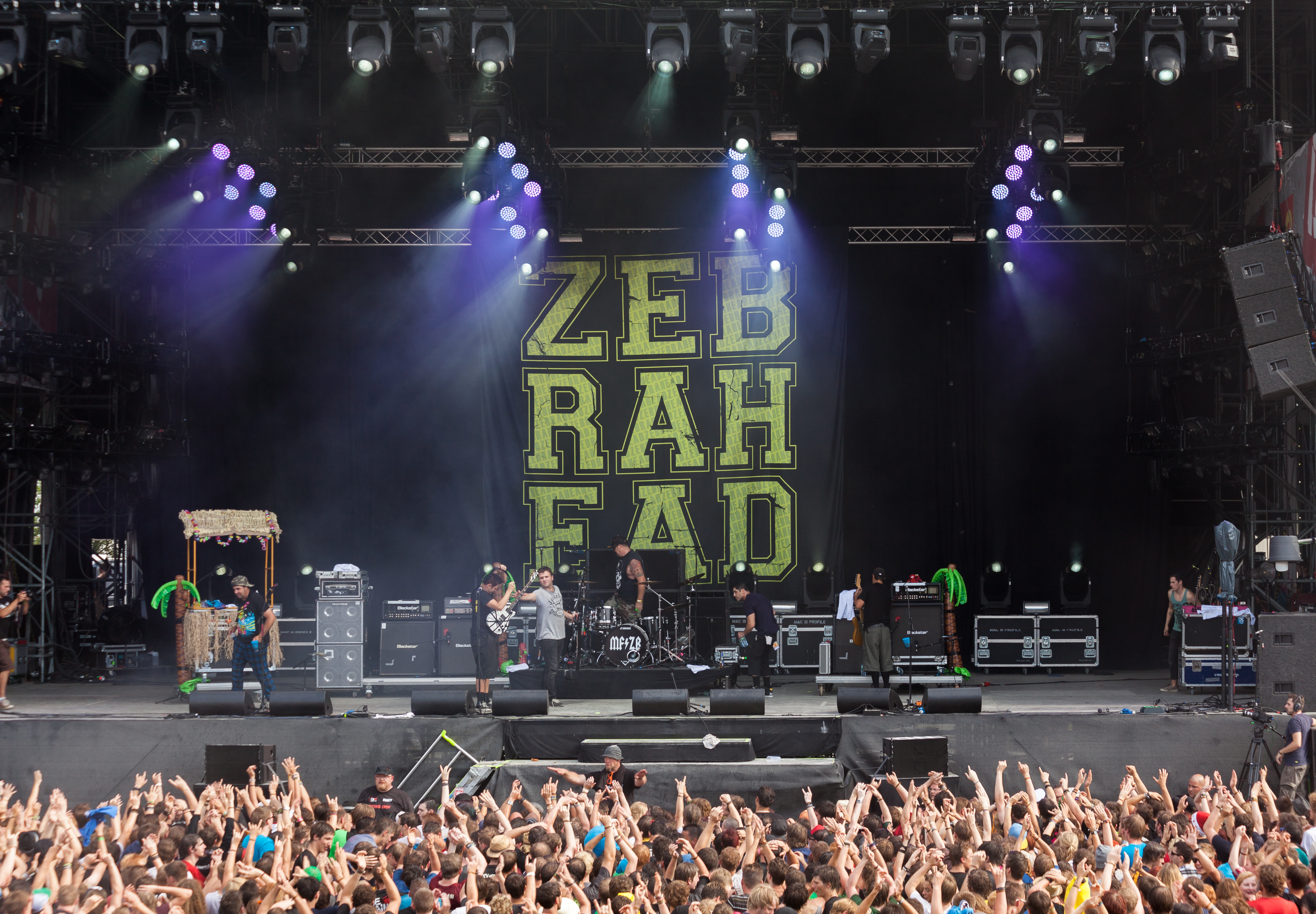
- Zebrahead in 2012
- Studio albums: 13
- Extended plays: 5
- Live albums: 1
- Compilation albums: 2
- Singles: 39
- Video albums: 5
- Music videos: 43

The discography of Zebrahead, an American punk rock band, currently consists of 13 studio albums, 2 compilation albums, 39 singles, 43 music videos, 5 video albums, 7 extended plays and 1 demo.

Zebrahead formed in 1996, releasing their self-titled debut album Zebrahead (more commonly known as Yellow due to the color of the cover) through independent label Doctor Dream Records in April 1998, before getting signed to Columbia Records and releasing their mainstream debut Waste of Mind in October later that year, which charted at No. 34 on the U.S Top Heatseekers chart, along with the single "Get Back", which charted on the U.S Hot Modern Rock Tracks charts at No. 32.

The band's follow-up album Playmate of the Year was released in August 2000 and charted at No. 4 on the U.S Top Heatseekers, No. 127 on the Billboard 200 and No. 20 on the Japanese charts. MFZB, released in October 2003, served as Zebrahead's fourth studio album, charting at No. 33 on the Top Heatseekers chart and No. 9 on the Japanese charts, earning the band's first official record certification there as gold. Shortly before the departure of band member Justin Mauriello, Zebrahead released Waste of MFZB exclusively in Japan, due to their popularity there. It eventually peaked on the charts there at No. 16.

With new band member Matty Lewis, Zebrahead released their sixth studio album Broadcast to the World first in Japan in February 2006, before being released in other territories later through the year. Its peak position at No. 10 on the Japanese charts earned the band their second gold certification from there and overall. Zebrahead's follow-up album Phoenix was released in the summer months of 2008 and charted at No. 30 on the U.S Top Heatseeks and No. 10 in Japan.

In late 2009, the band released their first covers album, titled Panty Raid, featuring songs by female musicians from the 1990s and 2000s. It peaked at No. 8 on the Japanese charts. Zebrahead released their ninth studio album Get Nice! in the summer of 2011. The follow-up Call Your Friends was released two years later in August 2013.

In 2014 the band started a crowd funding campaign via PledgeMusic.com to release a live performance recorded in Köln, Germany, on 19 October 2013. A download of the album was released to pledgers on 16 December 2014. The album was released along with a DVD of the performance. Both are entitled Way More Beer, Live in Köln, Germany, October 19th, 2013.

== Albums ==
=== Studio albums ===
Album details	Chart positions				Certifications (sales threshold)
Album details	US	US Heat.	Japan (Oricon)	Japan (Billboard)	Certifications (sales threshold)
Zebrahead: Released: April 21, 1998; Label: Doctor Dream; Formats: CD, cassette	—	—	122	—	
Waste of Mind: Released: October 13, 1998; Label: Columbia; Formats: CD, cassette, digital download	—	34	30	—	
Playmate of the Year: Released: August 22, 2000; Label: Columbia; Formats: CD, cassette, digital download	127	4	20	—	
MFZB: Released: October 21, 2003; Label: Columbia; Formats: CD, digital download	—	33	9	—	RIAJ: Gold
Waste of MFZB: Released: July 22, 2004; Label: Sony Music Japan; Formats: CD	—	—	16	—	
Broadcast to the World: Released: February 22, 2006; Label: Sony Music Japan, Icon, SPV; Formats: CD, LP, digital download	—	—	10	—	RIAJ: Gold
Phoenix: Released: July 9, 2008; Label: Sony Music Japan, SPV, ICON, MES, EMI, Fontana North; Formats: CD, LP, digital download	—	30	10	11	
Panty Raid: Released: November 4, 2009; Label: Sony Music Japan; Formats: CD	—	—	8	7	
Get Nice!: Released: July 27, 2011; Label: Sony Music Japan, MFZB; Formats: CD, LP, digital download	—	—	13	14	
Call Your Friends: Released: August 7, 2013; Label: Sony Music, MFZB; Formats: CD, LP, digital download	—	—	16	15	
The Early Years – Revisited: Released: April 21, 2015; Label: Sony Music, MFZB, Rude; Formats: CD, LP, digital download	—	—	78	12	
Walk the Plank: Released: October 7, 2015; Label: Sony Music, MFZB, Rude; Formats: CD, LP, digital download	—	—	23	18	
Brain Invaders: Released: March 6, 2019; Label: Avex Entertainment, MFZB; Formats: CD, LP, digital download	—	—	40	—	
"—" denotes releases that did not chart or were not released in that territory.

=== Compilation albums ===
Album details	Chart positions	
Album details	Japan (Oricon)	Japan (Billboard)
Greatest Hits? – Volume 1: Released: March 11, 2015; Label: Sony Music Japan, MFZB; Formats: CD, digital download	25	20
The Bonus Brothers: Released: November 24, 2017; Label: MFZB; Formats: CD, LP, digital download	—	—
"—" denotes releases that did not chart or were not released in that territory.|

=== Extended plays ===
Extended play details	Chart positions
Extended play details	Japan
Stupid Fat Americans: Released: January 31, 2001; Label: Sony Music Japan; Formats: CD	85
Not the New Album: Released: July 8, 2008 (re-released February 2010); Label: ICON, MES; Formats: Digital download	—
Hell Yeah! ...It's a Tour: Released: October 22, 2009 (UK exclusive; limited edition); Label: MFZB Records; Formats: CD	—
Out of Control (with Man with a Mission): Released: May 20, 2015; Label: SMR; Formats: CD	2
Wanna Sell Your Soul?: Released: January 14, 2020; Label: MFZB Records; Formats: Digital download, streaming	—
III: Released: November 26, 2021; Label: MFZB Records; Formats: Digital download, streaming	—
II: Released: February 2, 2023; Label: MFZB Records; Formats: CD, vinyl, cassette, digital download, streaming	—
I: Released: November 13, 2024; Label: MFZB Records; Formats: CD, vinyl, cassette, digital download, streaming	—
O: Released: August 12, 2026; Label: MFZB Records; Formats: CD, vinyl, cassette, digital download, streaming	—
"—" denotes releases that did not chart or were not released in that territory.

=== Demos ===
Demo details	Chart positions
Demo details	US
One More Hit: Released: 1996; Label: Up Front Records; Formats: Cassette	—
"—" denotes releases that did not chart or were not released in that territory.

== Singles ==
Year	Song	Chart positions			Album
Year	Song	US Alt	Japan (Oricon)	Japan (Billboard)	Album
1998	"Check"	—	—	—N/a	Zebrahead
1998	"Get Back"	32	—	—N/a	Waste of Mind
1999	"The Real Me"	—	—	—N/a	Waste of Mind
1999	"Deck the Halls (I Hate Christmas)"	—	—	—N/a	Playmate of the Year
2000	"Playmate of the Year"	—	—	—N/a	Playmate of the Year
2001	"Now or Never"	—	—	—N/a	Playmate of the Year
2003	"Into You"	—	—	—N/a	MFZB
2004	"Rescue Me"	—	—	—N/a	MFZB
2004	"Falling Apart"	—	—	—N/a	MFZB
2004	"Hello Tomorrow"	—	—	—N/a	MFZB
2004	"Are You for Real?"	—	—	—N/a	Waste of MFZB
2006	"Anthem"	—	—	—N/a	Broadcast to the World
2006	"Broadcast to the World"	—	—	—N/a	Broadcast to the World
2006	"Postcards from Hell"	—	—	—N/a	Broadcast to the World
2007	"Karma Flavored Whisky"	—	—	—N/a	Broadcast to the World
2008	"Mental Health"	—	16	16	Phoenix
2008	"Hell Yeah!"	—	—	—	Phoenix
2009	"The Juggernauts"	—	—	—	Phoenix
2009	"Girlfriend"	—	—	83	Panty Raid
2010	"Underneath It All"	—	—	—	Panty Raid
2011	"Ricky Bobby"	—	—	—	Get Nice!
2011	"Get Nice!"	—	—	76	Get Nice!
2013	"Call Your Friends"	—	—	48	Call Your Friends
2015	"Devil on My Shoulder"	—	—	—	Greatest Hits? – Volume 1/The Early Years – Revisited
2015	"Worse Than This"	—	—	—	Walk the Plank
2016	"So What"	—	—	—	Walk the Plank
2016	"Blue Light Special"	—	—	—	Walk the Plank
2019	"All My Friends Are Nobodies"	—	—	—	Brain Invaders
2019	"We're Not Alright"	—	—	—	Brain Invaders
2019	"When Both Sides Suck, We're All Winners"	—	—	—	Brain Invaders
2019	"If You're Looking for My Knife...I Think My Back Found It"	—	—	—	Brain Invaders
2019	"The Perfect Crime"	—	—	—	Wanna Sell Your Soul? - EP
2020	"Shock and Awe by the Sea"	—	—	—	Wanna Sell Your Soul? - EP
2021	"Lay Me to Rest"	—	—	—	III
2021	"A Long Way Down"	—	—	—	III
2021	"Homesick for Hope"	—	—	—	III
2021	"Out of Time"	—	—	—	III
2021	"Russian Roulette Is for Lovers?"	—	—	—	III
2023	"No Tomorrow"	—	—	—	II
2023	"Licking on a Knife for Fun"	—	—	—	II
2023	"Evil Anonymous"	—	—	—	II
2023	"F.L.F.U"	—	—	—	II
2023	"Middle Seat Blues"	—	—	—	II
2024	"I Have Mixed Drinks About Feelings"	—	—	—	I
2024	"Pulling Teeth"	—	—	—	I
2024	"Doomsday on the Radio"	—	—	—	I
2024	"Sink Like a Stone"	—	—	—	I
2024	"Puppet Stringers"	—	—	—	I
2026	"Burn Burn Burn"	—	—	—	O
2026	"Smoke Signals from My Couch"	—	—	—	O
2026	"I Know What You Did Last Summer"	—	—	—	O
2026	"A Perfect Life Is Such a Bore"	—	—	—	O
2026	"Happy Endings at the Movies"	—	—	—	O
2026	"I Don’t Know How to Put This (But I’m Kinda a Big Deal)"	—	—	—	O

== Music videos ==
Year	Song title	Director
1998	"Check"	Cory Reeder
1998	"Get Back"	Liam Lynch
2000	"Playmate of the Year"	Mark Kohr
2003	"Rescue Me"	Unknown
2004	"Into You"	Unknown
2004	"Hello Tomorrow"	Unknown
2004	"Are You For Real?"	Ilan Sharone
2006	"Anthem"	Ilan Sharone
2006	"Broadcast to the World"	Ilan Sharone
2006	"Postcards from Hell"	Ilan Sharone
2006	"Back To Normal"	James Watt
2007	"Karma Flavored Whisky"	Unknown
2007	"The Walking Dead"	James Watt
2008	"Mental Health"	Elliot Dillman
2008	"Hell Yeah!"	Elliot Dillman
2009	"The Juggernauts"	Elliot Dillman
2009	"Photographs"	Darren Reynolds
2009	"Girlfriend"	Unknown
2009	"All I Want for Christmas is You"	Unknown
2010	"Underneath It All"	Unknown
2011	"Ricky Bobby"	Unknown
2011	"Get Nice!"	Unknown
2011	"She Don't Wanna Rock"	Unknown
2011	"Blackout"	Mathieu Bouckenhove
2011	"Nudist Priest"	Arthur Cauty & Jake Cauty
2012	"Truck Stops and Tail Lights"	Thomas Barg & Daniel Lindner
2012	"Nothing to Lose"	Magnétoscope
2013	"Call Your Friends"	Unknown
2013	"I'm Just Here for the Free Beer"	Daniel Lindner & Thomas Barg
2013	"Sirens"	Unknown
2014	"Automatic"	ChiliCake Films
2015	"Lockjaw"	Daniel Lindner & Thomas Barg
2015	"Devil on My Shoulder"	Unknown
2015	"Worse Than This"	ChiliCake Films
2016	"So What"	Unknown
2016	"Who Brings a Knife to a Gunfight?"	Chilicake Films
2019	"All My Friends Are Nobodies"	Daniel Lindner
2019	"We're Not Alright"	Daniel Lindner and Thomas Barg
2019	"When Both Sides Suck, We're All Winners"	Daniel Lindner
2019	"Follow Me (Japanese Short Version) (Acoustic-Ish)"	Daniel Lindner and Owen Hardman
2020	"Up in Smoke"	Unknown
2021	"Lay Me to Rest"	Alex Ochoa
2021	"A Long Way Down"	Alex Ochoa
2021	"Out of Time"	Alex Ochoa
2022	"No Tomorrow"	Alex Ochoa
2022	"Licking on a Knife for Fun"	Ed Udhus, Connor Udhus
2022	"Evil Anonymous"	Daniel Lindner
2024	"I Have Mixed Drinks About Feelings"	Susanne Mueller
2024	"Pulling Teeth"	Daniel Lindner, Susanne Mueller
2026	"Burn Burn Burn"	Unknown
2026	"I Know What You Did Last Summer"	Connor Udhus
2026	"A Perfect Life is Such a Bore"	Unknown
2026	"Happy Endings at the Movies"	Unknown

== DVDs ==
DVD information
MFZB - The DVD - Banzai Mother F**ker!
- Released: October 22, 2003
- Label: Sony BMG
- Length: 40 min
The Show Must Go Off! Zebrahead Live At The House Of Blues
- Released: May 4, 2004
- Label: Kung Fu Records
- Length: 85 min
Blood, Sweat & Beers!!! Live In Tokyo
- Released: September 13, 2005
- Label: Independent release
- Length: N/A
Broadcast to the World: The Fucking DVD
- Released: December 16, 2007
- Label: Independent release
- Length: N/A
Way More Beer, Live in Köln, Germany, October 19, 2013
- Released: October 16, 2014
- Label: MFZB
- Length: N/A
