= The Bonus Brothers =

Compilation album by Zebrahead
- Released: November 24, 2017
- Recorded: 2005–15
- Length: 35:42
- Label: MFZB
- Producer: Cameron Webb, Howard Benson, Jason Freese, Paul Miner

Zebrahead chronology
Walk the Plank (2015)	The Bonus Brothers (2017)	Brain Invaders (2019)

The Bonus Brothers is a compilation album by American rock band Zebrahead, released November 24, 2017.

== Background ==
On October 13, 2017, Zebrahead announced the release of an album compiling of songs previously only available as bonus tracks on the Japanese editions of their studio albums Broadcast to the World (2006), Phoenix (2008), Get Nice! (2011), Call Your Friends (2013) and Walk the Plank (2015) for the following month.

Physical copies were available in limited quantities via the band's online store and as merchandise on their 2018 tour.

== Track listing ==
No.	Title	Album	Length
1.	"Blue Light Special"	Walk the Plank	3:25
2.	"Down Without a Fight"	Walk the Plank	3:37
3.	"Dance Sucka!"	Walk the Plank	2:48
4.	"Battle of the Bullshit"	Call Your Friends	3:17
5.	"Sex, Lies & Audiotape"	Call Your Friends	3:15
6.	"A Freak Gasoline Fight Accident"	Get Nice!	2:09
7.	"Light Up the Sky"	Get Nice!	3:45
8.	"We're Not a Cover Band, We're a Tribute Band"	Phoenix	3:47
9.	"The Art of Breaking Up"	Phoenix	3:20
10.	"Down in Flames"	Broadcast to the World	3:01
11.	"Riot Girl"	Broadcast to the World	3:18
