= Idle Hands =

1999 film by Rodman Flender

- Theatrical release poster
- Directed by: Rodman Flender
- Written by: Terri Hughes; Ron Milbauer
- Produced by: Andrew Licht; Jeffrey A. Mueller; Jennifer Todd; Suzanne Todd
- Starring: Devon Sawa; Seth Green; Elden Henson; Jessica Alba; Vivica A. Fox
- Cinematography: Christopher Baffa
- Edited by: Stephen E. Rivkin
- Music by: Graeme Revell
- Production companies: Licht/Mueller Film Corporation; Team Todd
- Distributed by: Columbia Pictures
- Release date: April 30, 1999
- Running time: 92 minutes
- Country: United States
- Language: English
- Budget: $25 million
- Box office: $4.2 million

Idle Hands is a 1999 American stoner comedy horror film directed by Rodman Flender, written by Terri Hughes and Ron Milbauer, and starring Devon Sawa, Seth Green, Elden Henson, Jessica Alba, and Vivica A. Fox. The film's plot follows the life of an average lazy stoner teenager, Anton Tobias, whose hand becomes possessed and goes on a killing spree, even after it is dismembered.

The film's title is based on the saying "idle hands are the Devil's play-things" or "the devil makes work for idle hands". The film received negative reviews from critics and bombed at the box office, grossing only $4.2 million from an estimated $25 million budget. Despite this, it has since gained a loyal cult following.

== Plot ==
Two days before Halloween, Mr. and Mrs. Tobias are killed in their suburban California home by an unseen assailant. Their lazy stoner teenage son, Anton, does not notice until the following night when he discovers their bodies. He shows the bodies to his friends, Mick and Pnub, and the three of them piece together that Anton is his parents' killer. After he stabs Mick in the head with a broken bottle, Anton realizes his right hand is possessed but he is unable to stop it from decapitating Pnub. Anton struggles to control his hand. He encounters his neighbor and crush Molly, and the two start a relationship. After Anton returns home, he buries his parents and friends in the backyard. However, Pnub and Mick decide not to go to heaven, returning to their former bodies and rising from the grave as zombies.

Meanwhile, a druidic high priestess named Debi LeCure is hunting the spirit responsible for killings across the country. After his hand kills two cops in his living room, Anton cuts it off with a cleaver. Pnub and Mick seek out a First-Aid Kit while Anton traps the hand in a microwave, burning it. Meanwhile, Debi (now along with Randy, Anton's neighbor) hunts Anton down to put a stop to the possessed hand. After sending Molly to the school dance, Anton returns home to finish off the hand. Unfortunately, Pnub and Mick inadvertently let go of the hand. The three then steal Randy's truck and head to the school. Mick and Pnub go to the Halloween dance to watch over Molly, while Anton looks for the hand. Randy and Debi meet up with Anton. Debi explains that the hand will drag Molly's soul into Hell. Anton crashes the dance and tries to warn everyone about his hand, but is ignored.

The hand then scalps the band's lead singer, causing a panic. Molly and her friend Tanya escape through the vents. They attempt to go through a fan, which they stop with Tanya's shoe, but Tanya gets caught on the rope. Molly tries to pull Tanya off the fan, and Anton's hand ends up removing Tanya's shoe, allowing her to be pulled to her death in the fan. Molly then runs into the art room, knocking her out. Anton enters and fights with the hand while it is inside a puppet, but it escapes to the auto shop, where Molly is strapped to a car in her bra and panties, being raised toward the ceiling. Anton, Mick, and Pnub fight with the hand over the controls. Mick finds a mechanic's bong, and he and Pnub smoke "for strength". Anton blows some smoke into the hand (still inside a hand puppet) until it drops the controls, and they save Molly. Debi throws a ritual knife into the hand, stopping it in a puff of smoke and fire. She and Randy take off for "ritualistic sex." Anton releases Molly from the top of the car, and they go under the car and start making out. In the process of lighting the bong for Mick, Pnub accidentally hits the controls for the car, and Anton is crushed by the car.

In the film's conclusion, Anton is in a body cast in the hospital, having given up heaven to stay with Molly, and Mick and Pnub are now his Guardian Angels. When he is left alone in his room, Anton looks up and sees the message "I am under the bed" written on the ceiling. Mick and Pnub walk down the hall, pondering whether to tell Anton they were the ones who wrote the message, but decide against it, laughing.

== Cast ==
- Devon Sawa as Anton Tobias
- Seth Green as Mick
- Elden Henson as Pnub
- Jessica Alba as Molly
- Vivica A. Fox as Debi LeCure
- Jack Noseworthy as Randy
- Christopher Hart as The Hand
- Steve Van Wormer as Curtis
- Fred Willard as Mr. Tobias
- Connie Ray as Mrs. Tobias
- Katie Wright as Tanya
- Kelly Monaco as Tiffany
- Sean Whalen as Officer McMacy
- Nick Sadler as Officer Ruck
- Randy Oglesby as Sheriff Buchanan
- Timothy Stack as Principal Tidwell
- The Offspring as Themselves
- Dexter Holland as Himself
- Mindy Sterling as Lady Bowler
- Joey Slotnick as Burger Jungle Manager
- Tom DeLonge as Burger Jungle Employee
- Kyle Gass as Burger Jungle Guy
- Carl Gabriel Yorke as Chaperone

== Production ==
An elaborate swimming pool sequence utilizing a large pool model, "wall of hands" and a "hell hole" visual was initially planned as the film's final "hand" encounter. However, initial post viewing tests suggested the ending did not quite mesh with the overall intended tone of the film. A replacement shop class sequence with both comic and horror elements was substituted, delaying the film's release by several months. The original swimming pool sequence with mostly completed effects can be watched as a bonus feature on DVD presentations.

== Release ==
=== Box office ===
The film opened on April 30, 1999, in 1,611 theaters. It grossed $1.8 million during its first week, and then a total of just over $4 million on a budget of $20–25 million, making it a box-office bomb. The film's release was hindered by coming out the same month of the Columbine High School massacre, which even led distributor Columbia to consider a delay, ultimately cancelling the premiere and seeing many theaters, especially in Colorado, where the school shooting happened, deciding not to screen Idle Hands. Senator Joe Lieberman berated Idle Hands in Congress as "another grossly violent film targeted at teens that uses killing as a form of comic relief", with particular scorn for the marketing campaign.

=== Critical response ===
On review aggregator website Rotten Tomatoes, the film had a 19% rating based on 58 reviews, with an average rating of 4.6/10. The site's consensus stated: "An uneasy mix of slapstick and gore, Idle Hands lacks the manic energy and comedic inspiration required to pull off its goofy premise". Metacritic reports a 31 out of 100 rating based on 20 critics, indicating "generally unfavorable" reviews.

In the Chicago Sun-Times, Roger Ebert gave the film 2 and a half stars out of 4, writing that it "sample[d] other teen horror movies like a video DJ with a tape deck, exhibiting high spirits and a crazed comic energy. It doesn't quite work, but it goes down swinging–with a disembodied hand." Robert Koehler of Variety was unimpressed by the film and found its blend of horror and humor ineffective, writing: "Perhaps thinking he had a farce to play with, [director] Flender encourages tons of mugging; by overplaying what should be underplayed, helmer and cast deliver a fatal stab to the intended comedy-horror."

Gene Seymour of the Los Angeles Times gave the film a favorable review, writing "what 'Idle Hands' lacks in originality, it makes up for in energy and insolence. It takes guts for a movie to indulge as much as this one does in proto-hippie humor and you find yourself tickled, in spite of yourself, by the movie's nerve, if not its jokes." Jeremy Wheeler of AllMovie.com also reviewed the film positively, stating, "It's definitely a case of better than you think. This horror comedy is high on gags and giant doses of marijuana... as is the love for gore and decapitated [sic] hand insanity to entertain any happy horror fiend."

== Soundtrack ==
A soundtrack album for Idle Hands was released through Time Bomb Recordings two weeks in advance of the film, featuring mostly punk rock and heavy metal artists. Though appearing on the album, the songs "Enthused" by Blink-182, "Mama Said Knock You Out" by The Waking Hours, "Bleeding Boy" by Disappointment Incorporated, and "My Girlfriend's Dead" by The Vandals were not used in the film. Chuck Donkers of AllMusic rated the album two stars out of five, remarking that it "befits a combination teen comedy/horror flick that climaxes at a high school dance" and "features songs from over-the-top adolescent favorites".

Idle Hands

Soundtrack album
- Released: April 13, 1999
- Genres: Punk rock; heavy metal
- Label: Time Bomb

Credits adapted from the album's liner notes
No.	Title	Writer(s)	Performer	Length
1.	"Second Solution" (from The Living End, 1998)	Chris Cheney	The Living End	2:59
2.	"Enthused" (from Dude Ranch, 1997)	Tom DeLonge, Mark Hoppus, Scott Raynor	Blink-182	2:49
3.	"Beheaded" (1999)	Dexter Holland, Greg K., Noodles, Ron Welty	The Offspring	2:39
4.	"Mama Said Knock You Out" (originally performed by LL Cool J)	Marlon Williams, Bobby Ervin, James Todd Smith	The Waking Hours	2:52
5.	"Dragula" (Hot Rod Herman remix, from "Dragula" single, 1998)	Rob Zombie, Scott Humphrey	Rob Zombie	4:38
6.	"Mindtrip" (Idle Hands mix)	Ed Udhus, Ali Tabatabaee, Greg Bergdorf, Justin Mauriello, Ben Osmundson	Zebrahead	2:14
7.	"Push It" (from Wisconsin Death Trip, 1999)	Wayne Wells, Ken Lacey, Antonio Campos, Koichi Fukuda	Static-X	2:49
8.	"Bleeding Boy" (from F=0, 1999)	Brian Burns, Mark Christian, Warren Huart, Roel Kuiper, Doug Vandyck	Disappointment Incorporated	4:06
9.	"Cailin" (from Unwritten Law, 1998)	Scott Russo, Rob Brewer, Steve Morris, Wade Youman	Unwritten Law	3:59
10.	"My Girlfriend's Dead" (from Hitler Bad, Vandals Good, 1998)	Warren Fitzgerald	The Vandals	2:40
11.	"Rude Boy Rock" (from City Delerious, 1998)	Justin Robertson	Lionrock	4:52
12.	"Shout at the Devil" (from Shout at the Devil, 1983)	Nikki Sixx	Mötley Crüe	3:15
13.	"Idle Hands Theme"	Graeme Revell	Graeme Revell	3:06

In addition to those on the soundtrack album, the following songs are also used in the film:

No.	Title	Writer(s)	Performer	Length
1.	"Bloodclot" (from Life Won't Wait, 1998)	Tim Armstrong, Lars Frederiksen	Rancid	2:45
2.	"Core (In Time)" (from This Euphoria, 1998)	David Garza	David Garza	3:06
3.	"Glow in the Dark" (from This Euphoria, 1998)	David Garza	David Garza	3:09
4.	"How Do You Feel" (from Slow to Burn, 1996)	Peter Daou, Vanessa Daou	Vanessa Daou	3:51
5.	"I Am a Pig" (from Voyeurs, 1998)	Rob Halford, John Lowery, Bob Marlette	2wo	3:37
6.	"I Wanna Be Sedated" (originally performed by the Ramones)	Dee Dee Ramone, Joey Ramone, Johnny Ramone	The Offspring	2:19
7.	"Mindtrip" (from Zebrahead, 1998)	Ed Udhus, Ali Tabatabaee, Greg Bergdorf, Justin Mauriello, Ben Osmundson	Zebrahead	2:15
8.	"New York Groove" (originally performed by Hello; from Ace Frehley, 1978)	Russ Ballard	Ace Frehley	3:01
9.	"Peppyrock" (from Birth Through Knowledge, 1998)	Lo-Ki, Stone Groove, DJ Spinz, Adam Carlo, Sam Cino, Matt DeMatteo	Birth Through Knowledge	4:25
10.	"Pop That Coochie" (from Sports Weekend: As Nasty as They Wanna Be, Pt. 2, 1991)	David Hobbs, Chris Wong Won	2 Live Crew	4:17
11.	"Santeria" (from Sublime, 1996)	Bradley Nowell, Bud Gaugh, Eric Wilson	Sublime	3:03
12.	""Good Friends & a bottle of pills"" (from Far Beyond Driven, 1994)	Pantera	Pantera	2:52

== In popular culture ==
The film was parodied in the Robot Chicken episode "Dragon Nuts", in the sketch "Idle Nuts". The sketch has essentially the same plot as the original movie, but involving possessed testicles instead of a possessed hand. Seth Green, who played Mick in Idle Hands, is also an executive producer and co-creator of Robot Chicken.

== Remake ==
In November 2024, it was announced that Finn Wolfhard and Billy Bryk will write and possibly direct a remake of the film. Jason Reitman and Gil Kenan are involved as producers, along with original producers Jennifer Todd and Suzanne Todd.
