= Panty Raid (album) =

Studio album by Zebrahead
- Released: November 4, 2009 (Japan) December 8, 2009 (International)
- Recorded: March–April 2009
- Length: 38:42
- Label: MFZB
- Producer: Jason Freese

Zebrahead chronology
Phoenix (2008)	Panty Raid (2009)	Get Nice! (2011)

Singles from Panty Raid
- 1. "Girlfriend" Released: September 20, 2009; 2. "Underneath It All" Released: January 2010

Panty Raid is the eighth studio album released by American punk rock band Zebrahead.

The album consists entirely of cover songs by female pop artists of the past two decades, including singers such as Avril Lavigne, Christina Aguilera, Gwen Stefani and Britney Spears.

== Singles ==
- "Girlfriend" - a cover of the song originally by Avril Lavigne, was released as the lead single from the album in September 2009. The song peaked at No. 84 on the U.S. Alternative Songs chart, a music video - parodying the original music video for "Girlfriend", accompanied the single's release.
- "Underneath It All" - a cover of the song originally by No Doubt, was released as the second and final single from the album in January 2010. A music video accompanied its release.

== Track listing ==
No.	Title	Writer(s)	Original artist (date)	Length
1.	"Survivor"	Beyoncé Knowles, Mathew Knowles, Anthony Dent	Destiny's Child (2001)	3:25
2.	"Girls Just Want to Have Fun"	Robert Hazard	Cyndi Lauper (1983)	2:05
3.	"Underneath It All"	Gwen Stefani, Dave Stewart	No Doubt feat. Lady Saw (2001)	3:13
4.	"Trouble"	Jacqui Blake, Carrie Askew	Shampoo (1994)	2:28
5.	"London Bridge"	Stacy Ferguson, Sean Garrett, Mike Hartnett, Jamal Jones	Fergie (2006)	2:25
6.	"Beautiful"	Linda Perry	Christina Aguilera (2002)	3:04
7.	"Girlfriend"	Avril Lavigne, Lukasz "Dr. Luke" Gottwald	Avril Lavigne (2007)	3:05
8.	"The Sweet Escape"	Stefani, Aliaune Thiam, Giorgio Tuinfort	Gwen Stefani feat. Akon (2006)	2:52
9.	"(Introduction)"			0:15
10.	"Jenny from the Block"	Jennifer Lopez, Troy Oliver, mrDEYO, Samuel Barnes, Jean-Claude Olivier, Fernando Arbex, Lawrence Parker, Scott Sterling, Michael Oliver	Jennifer Lopez feat. Styles P and Jadakiss (2002)	2:39
11.	"Rehab"	Amy Winehouse	Amy Winehouse (2006)	3:08
12.	"Spice Up Your Life"	Richard Stannard, Matt Rowe, Spice Girls	Spice Girls (1997)	2:26
13.	"(Introduction)"			0:11
14.	"Oops!... I Did It Again"	Max Martin, Rami Yacoub	Britney Spears (2000)	2:10
15.	"Get the Party Started"	Perry	Pink (2001)	2:24
16.	"Mickey"	Mike Chapman, Nicky Chinn	Toni Basil (1982)	2:45

Japanese bonus tracks
No.	Title	Writer(s)	Original artist (date)	Length
17.	"All I Want for Christmas Is You"	Mariah Carey, Walter Afanasieff	Mariah Carey (1994)	2:55
18.	"Who Let the Dogs Out" (Hidden bonus track)	Anslem Douglas	Baha Men (2000)	0:40

Digital "Bonus Edition" track list
No.	Title	Writer(s)	Original artist (date)	Length
1.	"Survivor"	Beyoncé Knowles, Mathew Knowles, Anthony Dent	Destiny's Child (2001)	3:25
2.	"Girls Just Want to Have Fun"	Robert Hazard	Cyndi Lauper (1983)	2:05
3.	"Underneath It All"	Gwen Stefani, Dave Stewart	No Doubt feat. Lady Saw (2001)	3:13
4.	"Trouble"	Jacqui Blake, Carrie Askew	Shampoo (1994)	2:28
5.	"London Bridge"	Stacy Ferguson, Sean Garrett, Mike Hartnett, Jamal Jones	Fergie (2006)	2:25
6.	"Beautiful"	Linda Perry	Christina Aguilera (2002)	3:04
7.	"Girlfriend"	Avril Lavigne, Lukasz "Dr. Luke" Gottwald	Avril Lavigne (2007)	3:05
8.	"The Sweet Escape"	Stefani, Aliaune Thiam, Giorgio Tuinfort	Gwen Stefani feat. Akon (2006)	2:52
9.	"Jenny from the Block"	Jennifer Lopez, Troy Oliver, mrDEYO, Samuel Barnes, Jean-Claude Olivier, Fernando Arbex, Lawrence Parker, Scott Sterling, Michael Oliver	Jennifer Lopez feat. Styles P and Jadakiss (2002)	2:39
10.	"Rehab"	Amy Winehouse	Amy Winehouse (2006)	3:08
11.	"Spice Up Your Life"	Richard Stannard, Matt Rowe, Spice Girls	Spice Girls (1997)	2:26
12.	"Oops!... I Did It Again"	Max Martin, Rami Yacoub	Britney Spears (2000)	2:10
13.	"Get the Party Started"	Perry	Pink (2001)	2:24
14.	"Mickey"	Mike Chapman, Nicky Chinn	Toni Basil (1982)	2:45
15.	"All I Want for Christmas Is You"	Mariah Carey, Walter Afanasieff	Mariah Carey (1994)	2:55
16.	"Wannabe"	Spice Girls; Matt Rowe; Richard Stannard	Spice Girls	2:30

The digital "Bonus Edition" removes the two introductory tracks seen on other releases and, while including Japan's previously exclusive bonus track, excludes that region's hidden track. In addition, a cover of the Spice Girls' Wannabe is appended to track list, entirely distinct from the recording present on Waste of MFZB, as Justin Mauriello had long since left the band at this point. This song has not seen release elsewhere.

== Personnel ==
- Ali Tabatabaee - lead vocals
- Matty Lewis - lead vocals, rhythm guitar
- Greg Bergdorf - lead guitar
- Ben Osmundson - bass guitar
- Ed Udhus - drums
- Jason Freese - keyboard, piano

== Chart positions ==
Charts	Peak position
Japan Albums Chart	8

== Release history ==
Region	Date
Japan	November 4, 2009
Europe	December 8, 2009
United States	December 8, 2009
