= Get Nice! =

Get Nice! may refer to:

- Get Nice! (EP), an EP by Spoon
- Get Nice! (album), an album by Zebrahead
