= The Yellow Album (disambiguation) =

The Yellow Album is an album by the Simpsons.

The Yellow Album may also refer to:

- Days of the New (1997 album), the debut album by Days of the New, commonly referred to as the Orange or Yellow album
- Album 10 or The Yellow Album, a 1988 live album by Psychic TV
- SpongeBob SquarePants: The Yellow Album, a 2005 soundtrack album
- Zebrahead (album), a demo album by Zebrahead, commonly referred to as Yellow or The Yellow Album
- 72 Seasons (2023) album by Metallica
