= Greatest Hits? – Volume 1 =

Greatest hits album by Zebrahead
- Released: March 11, 2015
- Recorded: 2005–15
- Length: 74:15
- Label: Sony Music Japan, MFZB
- Producer: Cameron Webb, Howard Benson, Jason Freese

Zebrahead chronology
Call Your Friends (2013)	Greatest Hits? – Volume 1 (2015)	The Early Years – Revisited (2015)

Singles from Greatest Hits? – Volume 1
- 1. "Devil on My Shoulder" Released: March 26, 2015

Greatest Hits? – Volume 1 is the first greatest hits album by American rock band Zebrahead, released March 11, 2015 exclusively in Japan. The album is followed by the lead single "Devil on My Shoulder", released March 26, 2015.

== Background ==
In celebration of the 20th anniversary of the band's formation, Zebrahead announced the release of their first compilation album on February 5, 2015 for an exclusive release in Japan. A new track "Devil on My Shoulder" is included as the lead single, and several songs from the band's earlier years with former lead singer and rhythm guitarist, Justin Mauriello, is re-recorded with the co-lead vocalist at the time of recording and release, Matty Lewis.

== Track listing ==
No.	Title	Length
1.	"Check"	2:25
2.	"Get Back"	3:30
3.	"Jagoff"	3:26
4.	"Playmate of the Year"	2:59
5.	"Now or Never"	3:00
6.	"Wasted"	3:26
7.	"Rescue Me"	3:18
8.	"Into You"	3:07
9.	"Hello Tomorrow"	3:57
10.	"Wannabe"	2:31
11.	"Broadcast to the World"	3:36
12.	"Anthem"	3:33
13.	"Postcards from Hell"	2:45
14.	"Hell Yeah!"	3:36
15.	"Mental Health"	3:13
16.	"The Juggernauts"	3:58
17.	"Girlfriend"	3:05
18.	"Get Nice!"	3:23
19.	"Ricky Bobby"	2:42
20.	"She Don't Wanna Rock"	3:09
21.	"Call Your Friends"	3:07
22.	"Sirens"	3:26
23.	"Devil on My Shoulder" (featuring Jean-Ken Johnny of Man with a Mission)	3:03
