= Broadcast to the World =

Studio album by Zebrahead
- Released: February 22, 2006
- Recorded: 2005
- Studios: Maple, Santa Ana, California; Noise Factory, Fullerton, California
- Genres: Pop-punk; rap rock
- Length: 51:04
- Label: Icon Mes
- Producers: Cameron Webb, Zebrahead

Zebrahead chronology
Waste of MFZB (2004)	Broadcast to the World (2006)	Phoenix (2008)

Singles from Broadcast to the World
- 1. "Anthem" Released: 2006; 2. "Broadcast to the World" Released: 2006; 3. "Postcards From Hell" Released: 2006; 4. "Karma Flavored Whiskey" Released: 2007

Broadcast to the World is the sixth studio album released by American punk rock band Zebrahead.

It is their first album with new co-vocalist/rhythm guitarist Matty Lewis, who replaced former member Justin Mauriello after he left the group in late 2004.

== Production ==
Broadcast to the World was recorded at Maple Studios in Santa Ana, California, and Noise Factory in Fullerton, California, with Cameron Webb and the band as producers. Webb and Greg Bergdorf handled the recording; additional production was done by Marshall Altman and Bergdorf. Bergdorf and Sergio Chavez performed additional editing. Webb mixed the recordings, before the album was mastered by Brian Gardner at Bernie Grundman in Hollywood, California.

The album was influenced by Lit's A Place in the Sun (1999).

== Release ==
Zebrahead embarked on a West Coast US tour in January 2006 alongside Reel Big Fish and Goldfinger. On October 17, 2006, Broadcast to the World was made available for streaming via Alternative Press. It was released in the U.S. on October 24 through Icon. In November 2006, the band went on a tour of the US with support from Authority Zero. On March 3, 2007, a music video was released for "Karma Flavored Whisky"; the following month, they went on a tour of Europe with MxPx. In June and July 2007, the band toured the US alongside Unwritten Law, Bullets and Octane, and Neurosonic.

== Critical reception ==
Professional ratings
Review scores
Source	Rating
AllMusic	3.5/5 stars
Melodic	2.5/5 stars
Punknews.org	4/5

AllMusic reviewer Rick Anderson called them a heavy rock band that are "...owing far more to the old school than the new, but that adds the welcome element of solid melodic hooks to the mix." He said that the music had elements of The Clash and Rancid. He also praised its range of songs to enable the band's audience to either sing/rap along, mosh along to or yell along to.

== Track listing ==
All songs written by Zebrahead.

No.	Title	Length
1.	"Broadcast to the World"	3:16
2.	"Rated "U" for Ugly"	3:01
3.	"Anthem"	3:33
4.	"Enemy"	2:56
5.	"Back to Normal"	3:40
6.	"Postcards from Hell"	2:45
7.	"Karma Flavored Whisky"	4:07
8.	"Here's to You"	3:07
9.	"Wake Me Up"	3:49
10.	"Lobotomy for Dummies"	2:36
11.	"The Walking Dead"	3:09
12.	"Your New Boyfriend Wears Girl Pants"	4:28

Bonus tracks on Japanese release
No.	Title	Length
13.	"Riot Girl"	3:18
14.	"Down in Flames" (Hidden tracks "Get on the Bus" plays at 4:20 and "Hit It Again" at 6:37)	7:17

== Personnel ==
Personnel per booklet.

Zebrahead

- Greg Bergdorf – guitar
- Ali Tabatabaee – lead vocals
- Ben Osmundson – bass
- Matty Lewis – lead vocals, guitar
- Ed Udhus – drums

Additional musicians

- Jason Freese – additional instruments

Production and design

- Cameron Webb – producer, mixing, recording
- Zebrahead – producer
- Marshall Altman – additional production
- Greg Bergdorf – additional production, recording, additional editing
- Sergio Chavez – additional editing
- Brian Gardner – mastering
- Shawn Harris – artwork
- Emilee Seymour – artwork

== Chart positions ==
Charts	Peak position	Certification
Japan Charts	10	Gold

== Media usages ==
- The song "Lobotomy for Dummies" was featured in the 2006 video game, FlatOut 2. It was also featured in the 2007 video game, MX vs. ATV Untamed.
- The songs "Wake Me Up" and "The Walking Dead" were featured in the 2006 video game, The Fast and the Furious.

== Release history ==
Country	Date
Japan	February 22, 2006
Germany	June 30, 2006
Europe	July 3, 2006
Canada	October 24, 2006
United States	October 24, 2006
