= Call Your Friends =

Studio album by Zebrahead
- Released: August 7, 2013 (Japan) August 13, 2013 (International)
- Recorded: January–June 2013
- Studio: Maple Sound Studios (Santa Ana, California)
- Genres: Pop punk; rap rock; heavy metal
- Length: 47:09
- Label: MFZB
- Producer: Cameron Webb

Zebrahead chronology
Get Nice! (2011)	Call Your Friends (2013)	Greatest Hits? – Volume 1 (2015)

Singles from Call Your Friends
- 1. "Call Your Friends" Released: July 10, 2013

Professional ratings
Review scores
Source	Rating
Drowned in Sound	5/10
Rock Hard	8.5/10

Call Your Friends is the tenth studio album by American punk rock band Zebrahead released in Japan on August 7, 2013 and worldwide on August 13 and 16, 2013 respectively. The album is available in five different covers, each available in a specific region.

Long-time guitarist Greg Bergdorf departed before album's production and at the start of writing the album. He was replaced by Dan Palmer of Death by Stereo.

== Track listing ==
No.	Title	Length
1.	"Sirens"	3:26
2.	"I'm Just Here for the Free Beer"	3:42
3.	"With Friends Like These, Who Needs Herpes?"	3:39
4.	"Call Your Friends"	3:07
5.	"Murder on the Airwaves"	3:38
6.	"Public Enemy Number One"	3:30
7.	"Born to Lose"	2:59
8.	"Stick 'Em Up Kid!"	3:15
9.	"Automatic"	2:51
10.	"Nerd Armor"	2:58
11.	"Panic in the Streets"	3:46
12.	"Don't Believe the Hype"	3:35
13.	"Until the Sun Comes Up"	3:01
14.	"Last Call"	3:42

Japanese bonus tracks
No.	Title	Length
15.	"Sex, Lies & Audiotape"	3:13
16.	"Battle of the Bullshit"	3:16
17.	"Ready Steady Go" (L'Arc-en-Ciel cover)	3:18

== Personnel ==
Zebrahead

- Ali Tabatabaee – rapping
- Matty Lewis – lead vocals, rhythm guitar
- Dan Palmer – lead guitar
- Ben Osmundson – bass guitar
- Ed Udhus – drums

Additional artists

- Cameron Webb – keyboards
- Jason Freese – additional instruments

Production

- Cameron Webb – production, mixer, engineer
- Brian Gardner – mastering

Artwork

- Robby Wallace – artwork and layout
- Tom Hoppa – photography
- Tawnie Jaclyn – model

== Release history ==
Country	Date	Format
Japan	August 7, 2013	CD, digital download
Canada	August 13, 2013	CD, digital download
Europe	August 13, 2013	CD, digital download
South America	August 13, 2013	CD, digital download
United States	August 13, 2013	CD, digital download
Australia	August 16, 2013	CD, digital download
Austria	August 16, 2013	CD, digital download
Germany	August 16, 2013	CD, digital download
Switzerland	August 16, 2013	CD, digital download
Worldwide	August 16, 2013	CD, digital download
