= Walk the Plank (Zebrahead album) =

2015 studio album by Zebrahead

Studio album by Zebrahead
- Released: October 7, 2015 (Japan); October 16, 2015 (worldwide)
- Recorded: 2015
- Studio: BuzzBomb Sound Labs (Orange, California)
- Genre: Pop punk; rapcore
- Length: 37:28
- Label: Rude
- Producer: Paul Miner

Zebrahead chronology
The Early Years – Revisited (2015)	Walk the Plank (2015)	The Bonus Brothers (2017)

Singles from Walk the Plank
- 1. "Worse Than This" Released: September 25, 2015

Walk the Plank is the twelfth studio album by American punk rock band Zebrahead, released in Japan on October 7, 2015, and globally on October 16, 2015.

== Track listing ==
No.	Title	Length
1.	"Who Brings a Knife to a Gunfight?"	2:51
2.	"Worse Than This"	3:23
3.	"Headrush"	2:43
4.	"Keep It to Myself"	2:59
5.	"Running with Wolves"	3:34
6.	"So What"	2:56
7.	"Save Your Breath"	3:13
8.	"Walk the Plank"	3:13
9.	"Under the Deep Blue Sea"	1:28
10.	"Wasted Generation"	2:27
11.	"Battle Hymn"	2:43
12.	"Kings of the Here and Now"	2:40
13.	"Freak Show"	3:18

Japanese bonus tracks
No.	Title	Length
14.	"Dance Sucka!"	2:48
15.	"Down Without a Fight"	3:37
16.	"Blue Light Special" (Kyle Black mix)	3:27

== Personnel ==
Zebrahead

- Ali Tabatabaee – lead vocals
- Matty Lewis – lead vocals, rhythm guitar
- Dan Palmer – lead guitar, backing vocals
- Ben Osmundson – bass guitar, backing vocals
- Ed Udhus – drums, percussion

== Charts ==
Chart (2015)	Peak position
UK Rock & Metal Albums (OCC)	35

== Release history ==
Territory	Date	Format
Japan	October 7, 2015	CD, DL, LP
North America	October 16, 2015	CD, DL, LP
South America	October 16, 2015	CD, DL, LP
Europe	October 16, 2015	CD, DL, LP
Australia	October 16, 2015	CD, DL, LP
