= Embrace the Curse =

Studio album by I Hate Kate
- Released: April 4, 2007; June 24, 2008 (re-release)
- Genre: Alternative rock, pop punk, electronic rock
- Length: 43:26; 46:20 (re-release)
- Label: Glassnote
- Producer: Mark Trombino, Linus of Hollywood, Justin Mauriello

I Hate Kate chronology
Act One (2006)	Embrace the Curse (2007)	Race to Red (2010)

Professional ratings
Review scores
Source	Rating
AbsolutePunk.net	(74%)
AllMusic	3.5/5 stars

Embrace the Curse is the first full-length album from I Hate Kate, released on April 4, 2007. It features several re-recordings from their Act One EP, and other songs they released earlier through their website.

== Track listing ==
(all songs written by Justin Mauriello, except "Major Tom (Coming Home)" by Peter Schilling)

1. "Bed of Black Roses" – 3:37
2. "Embrace the Curse" – 3:58
3. "She's a Man" - 4:19
4. "A Story I Can't Write" – 3:31
5. "It's You" – 4:40
6. "Then You Kiss" – 3:47
7. "Always Something" – 3:34
8. "The Thrill" – 3:23
9. "Outta My Head" – 3:36
10. "Love Association" – 4:32
11. "Major Tom (Coming Home)" (Peter Schilling cover) - 4:21

=== Re-release ===
Embrace the Curse was re-released on June 24, 2008 due to the band signing a record deal with Glassnote Records. Some minor changes were made to the album, including changing the name of "Always Something" to "It's Always Better" and adding the band's third single, "I'm in Love With a Sociopath".

1. "Bed of Black Roses" - 3:43
2. "It's Always Better" - 3:37
3. "Then You Kiss" - 3:48
4. "Inside Inside" - 4:23
5. "I'm in Love with a Sociopath" - 2:54
6. "It's You" - 4:07
7. "Story I Can't Write" - 3:37
8. "Embrace the Curse" - 4:00
9. "Major Tom (Coming Home)" (Peter Schilling cover) - 4:21
10. "The Thrill" - 3:26
11. "Love Association" - 4:38
12. "Outta My Head" - 3:46

== Personnel ==
- Justin Mauriello – rhythm guitar, vocals
- Jeremy Berghorst - lead guitar
- Scott Hayden – bass guitar
- Mike Lund – drums

== Production ==
- Dave Colvin – assistant engineer
- Carlos de la Garza – engineer
- Mike Fasano – drum technician
- Vlado Meller – mastering
- Raquel Olivo – photography
- Mark Santangelo – mastering assistant
- Mark Trombino – producer, engineer, mixing
