= Since 1972 =

Studio album by Josh Freese
- Released: March 24, 2009
- Recorded: Long Beach, California
- Genre: Glam rock
- Length: 29:45
- Label: Outerscope Records

Josh Freese chronology
The Notorious One Man Orgy (2000)	Since 1972 (2009)	My New Friends (2011)

Professional ratings
Review scores
Source	Rating
AllMusic	4/5 stars

Since 1972 is the second solo album by American drummer Josh Freese. It was released on March 24, 2009, on Freese's label, Outerscope.

== Track listing ==
All tracks are written by Josh Freese, except where noted.

No.	Title	Writer(s)	Length
1.	"I Don't Think That's OK"		3:30
2.	"We All Knew"		1:45
3.	"Blood On Your Knuckles"		2:24
4.	"2002"		3:24
5.	"I Wanna Cheat On My Girlfriend"		2:47
6.	"Who Am I To Say, Really?"	Josh Freese, Stone Gossard, Eric Walton	3:44
7.	"Point Some Fingers"		3:02
8.	"Get Away With It"		2:22
9.	"Because"		2:11
10.	"It's Fucked Up"		2:09
11.	"All Goddamn Day"		2:29

== Personnel ==
- Josh Freese - all instruments and vocals (except where noted below)

Additional musicians

- Warren Fitzgerald - guitar solo (3)
- Jason Freese - saxophone solo (10)
- Stone Gossard - bass guitar (6)
- Michael Landay - guitar solo (7)
- Phil Parlapiano - piano and harmonica (5)
- Skerik - Fender Rhodes keyboard (6)
- Lyle Workman - guitar solo (8)
