= Josh Freese =

American drummer (born 1972)

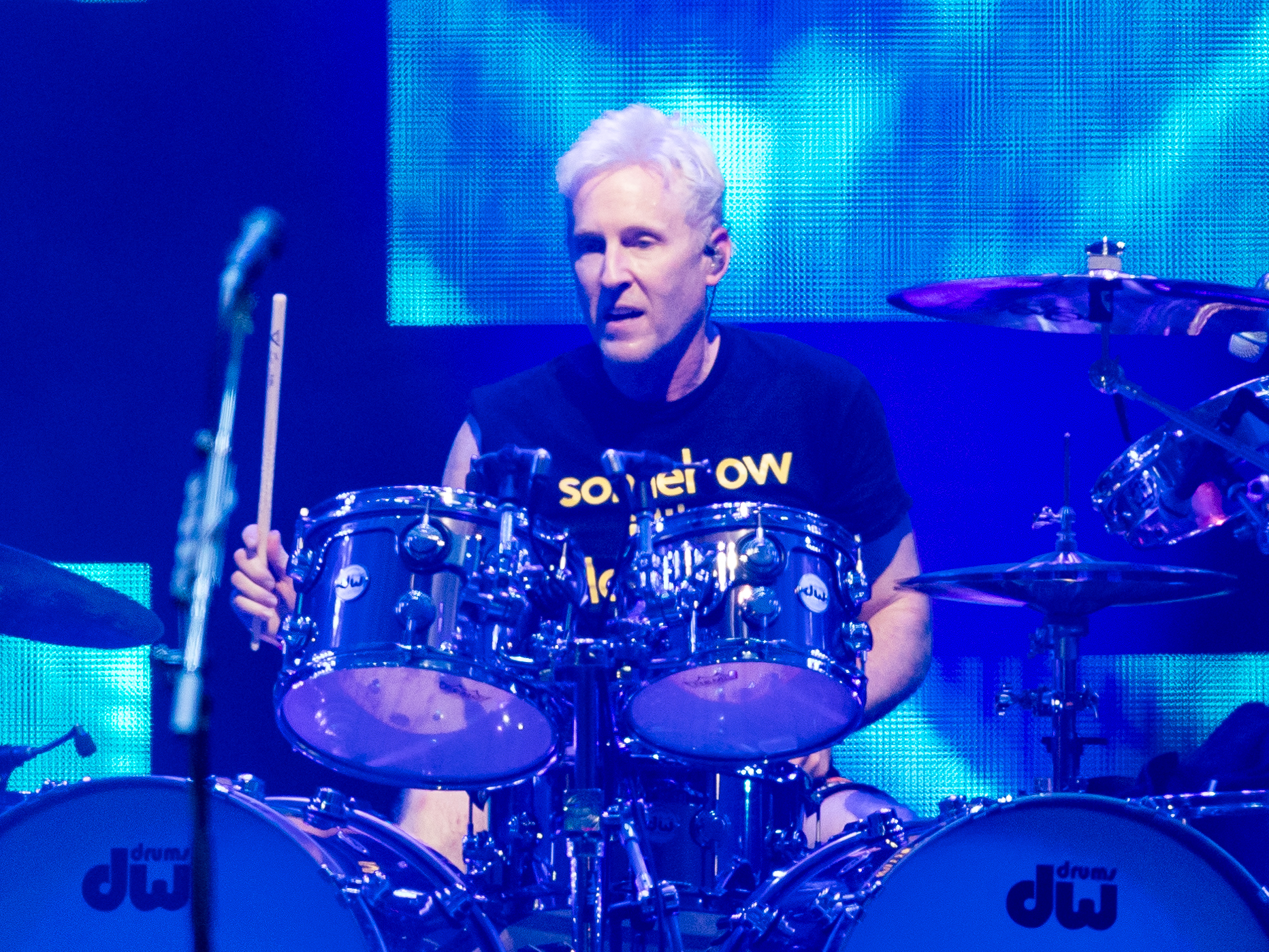
- Freese performing with the Foo Fighters at Rock am Ring 2023
- Born: Joshua Ryan Freese; December 25, 1972 (age 53); Orlando, Florida, U.S.
- Occupations: Musician; songwriter
- Years active: 1988–present
- Spouse: Nicole Freese (m. 2009)
- Children: 4
- Father: Stan Freese
- Relatives: Jason Freese (brother)
- Musical career
- Genres: Hard rock; heavy metal; punk rock; nu metal; new wave; industrial rock; alternative rock; pop; pop rock
- Instruments: Drums; percussion
- Works: Discography
- Labels: Kung Fu; Outerscope; Loosegroove
- Member of: The Vandals; A Perfect Circle; Viva Death
- Formerly of: Devo; Guns N' Roses; Black Light Burns; Sublime with Rome; Foo Fighters
- Website: thejoshfreese.com

Joshua Ryan Freese (born December 25, 1972) is an American drummer who has been a member of the punk rock band the Vandals since 1989, and the alt-rock supergroup A Perfect Circle from 1999 to 2012, and again since 2024. He was the drummer of the new wave band Devo from 1996 to 2023, the hard rock band Guns N' Roses from 1997 to 1999, the reggae rock band Sublime with Rome from 2011 to 2017, and the rock band Foo Fighters from 2023 to 2025.

A prolific session and touring drummer, Freese has appeared on over 400 albums since 1986 and performed live with artists including Nine Inch Nails, Weezer, Sting, 311, 100 Gecs, Ween, the Offspring and Danny Elfman. Freese's considerable output has earned him "the pristine reputation as one of the most in-demand session drummers in the business", according to Variety, while he jokingly dubbed himself "the blue collar freelance drummer to the stars".

== Early life ==
Joshua Ryan Freese was born on December 25, 1972, at Florida Hospital in Orlando, Florida. At the time of his birth, Freese's father, Stan Freese, was working at the newly opened Walt Disney World Resort as the director of bands and leader of the Walt Disney World Marching Band. His mother, Patricia (née Weatherhead, later Bridenstine), is a classical pianist and a writer.

In 1974, Freese's father was transferred to Disneyland Park in Southern California to lead the Disneyland Band. Freese and his younger brother Jason spent summers at the park while their father worked. Freese said that some of his earliest memories are of he and his brother marching with the Disneyland Band holding toy instruments.

Freese's first job was at Disneyland as a shoe shine boy during the summer of 1985. Freese and his brother would shine the shoes of park employees and worked for tips.

== Career ==
Freese began playing the drums when he was eight years old. His father set up a Yamaha drum set he had received through a promotional deal. After playing around on that drum set for two years, Freese's father took him to the 1983 NAMM Show, an annual music industry trade show at the Anaheim Convention Center. There he attracted the attention of the crowd by playing on a vendor's sample drum set.

Freese returned to the NAMM Show in 1985, where a representative from Simmons found the 12-year-old Freese playing a sample drum set and signed him to an endorsement deal. Freese played a Simmons electronic drum set at PASIC (the Percussive Arts Society International Convention) and in television commercials for Simmons.

=== Disneyland ===
By 1985, Freese's father had transitioned out of his bandleader role and into talent booking at Disneyland. That summer, Freese's father hired Polo, a Top 40 cover band composed of teenagers around Freese's age, which had just won the Junior Star Search competition on television. Freese became friends with the band's drummer, Jimmy Keegan, and was invited to sit in on a few songs during their sets at the Tomorrowland Terrace stage. The guest spots went so well that Freese was invited to join the band as an additional drummer. Freese played with Polo at Disneyland and other venues from 1985 to 1988.

=== The Zappas ===
In 1988, Freese met and befriended Ahmet Zappa, son of musician Frank Zappa, at a shoot for the TV movie 14 Going on 30. Zappa got Freese together with Zappa's brother Dweezil and the two began playing together casually. Dweezil then asked Freese to record with him, and Freese dropped out of high school to pursue recording full-time (Freese eventually received his GED years later). Not being old enough to drive, Freese's father drove him to the recording session in Los Angeles before Freese began staying with the Zappas during the week and going home to Orange County on the weekends. Freese's first recorded collaboration with Dweezil was the 1991 album Confessions.

=== The Vandals ===
While he was playing at Disneyland with Polo, Freese caught the eye of Dave Quackenbush and Joe Escalante, two members of the punk rock band the Vandals. In 1989, they hired Freese to be the band's drummer. Freese has played on all of the band's albums since except 2000's Look What I Almost Stepped In..., on which Suicidal Tendencies drummer Brooks Wackerman was deputized due to Freese's commitments with A Perfect Circle.

=== Devo ===
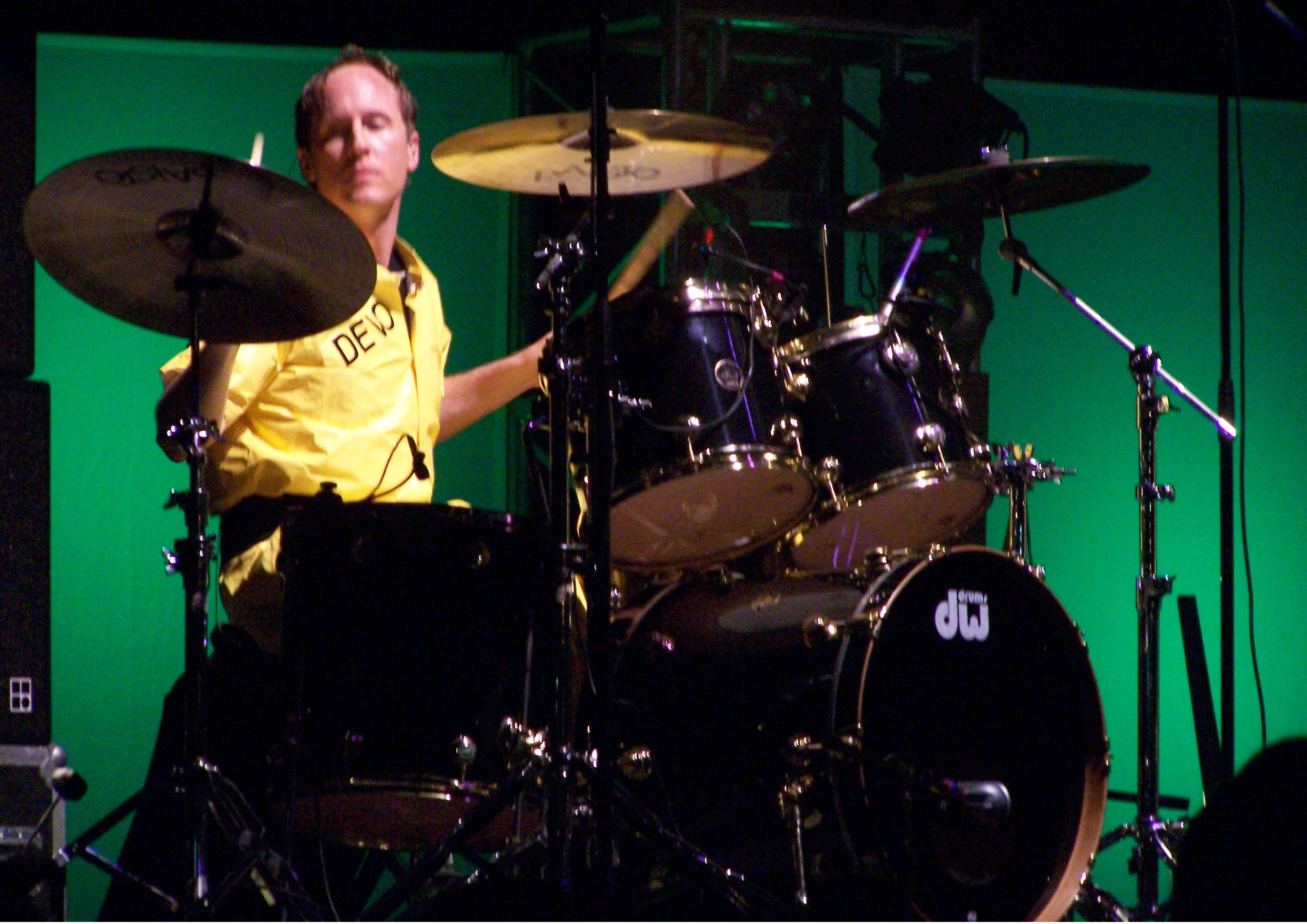
Freese performing with Devo in 2008

In 1996, Freese joined a reformed Devo for a show at the Sundance Film Festival, replacing David Kendrick. Freese has become their primary drummer in concert and in the studio since. Freese has said that he learned to play drums thanks to Devo's 1980 album Freedom of Choice. Freese played drums on Devo's 2010 album Something for Everybody, and provided backing vocals on Devo's holiday single "Merry Something to You".

=== Guns N' Roses ===
Freese was a member of hard rock band Guns N' Roses from 1997 to 1999, replacing Matt Sorum and signing a two-year contract. Initially hesitant about joining the band, he was persuaded by his friend and collaborator Paul Westerberg of the Replacements, who told Freese, "You should do it. Go do it. It sounds totally wrong; go do it. What are you going to do, be in some totally cool alternative band? Are you going to join the Foo Fighters or something obvious?" Coincidentally, Freese would subsequently go on to join an alternative band, A Perfect Circle, and later joined Foo Fighters.

With Guns N' Roses, Freese recorded the song "Oh My God" for the End of Days soundtrack and co-wrote the song "Chinese Democracy" with Axl Rose. Freese drummed on 30 tracks to potentially be included on Chinese Democracy, but his recordings were scrapped and re-recorded note-for-note by Bryan Mantia. He was credited with arrangements on four tracks on the album, released in 2008.

=== A Perfect Circle ===
Freese left Guns N' Roses in 1999 to join A Perfect Circle alongside Tool vocalist Maynard James Keenan and the band's founder Billy Howerdel. Freese said he chose to make the switch "because it seemed like a more tangible thing that was really going to happen. These guys aren't spending a million in the studio. They seem like they want to start a regular band. They want to write and record a record and go on tour six weeks from now. It all seemed very realistic."

A Perfect Circle's first album, 2000's Mer de Noms, was the highest charting debut for a rock group at number four on the Billboard 200 in its first week of sales. "I think it's a great record, and I feel proud of it," Freese said, retrospectively, in 2020. "I always feel okay patting myself on the back for certain projects because there's tons of projects I played on that I don't like."

The band's follow up release, 2003's Thirteenth Step, charted at number two in its opening week with over 233,000 copies sold. Freese ultimately played drums on the band's first three albums before leaving in 2012. Freese also played drums on two solo albums by Howerdel, one released under the moniker Ashes Divide in 2008 and the other under Howerdel's name in 2022. In March 2024, Freese confirmed he would be touring with A Perfect Circle in April for the first time in 13 years.

=== Foo Fighters ===
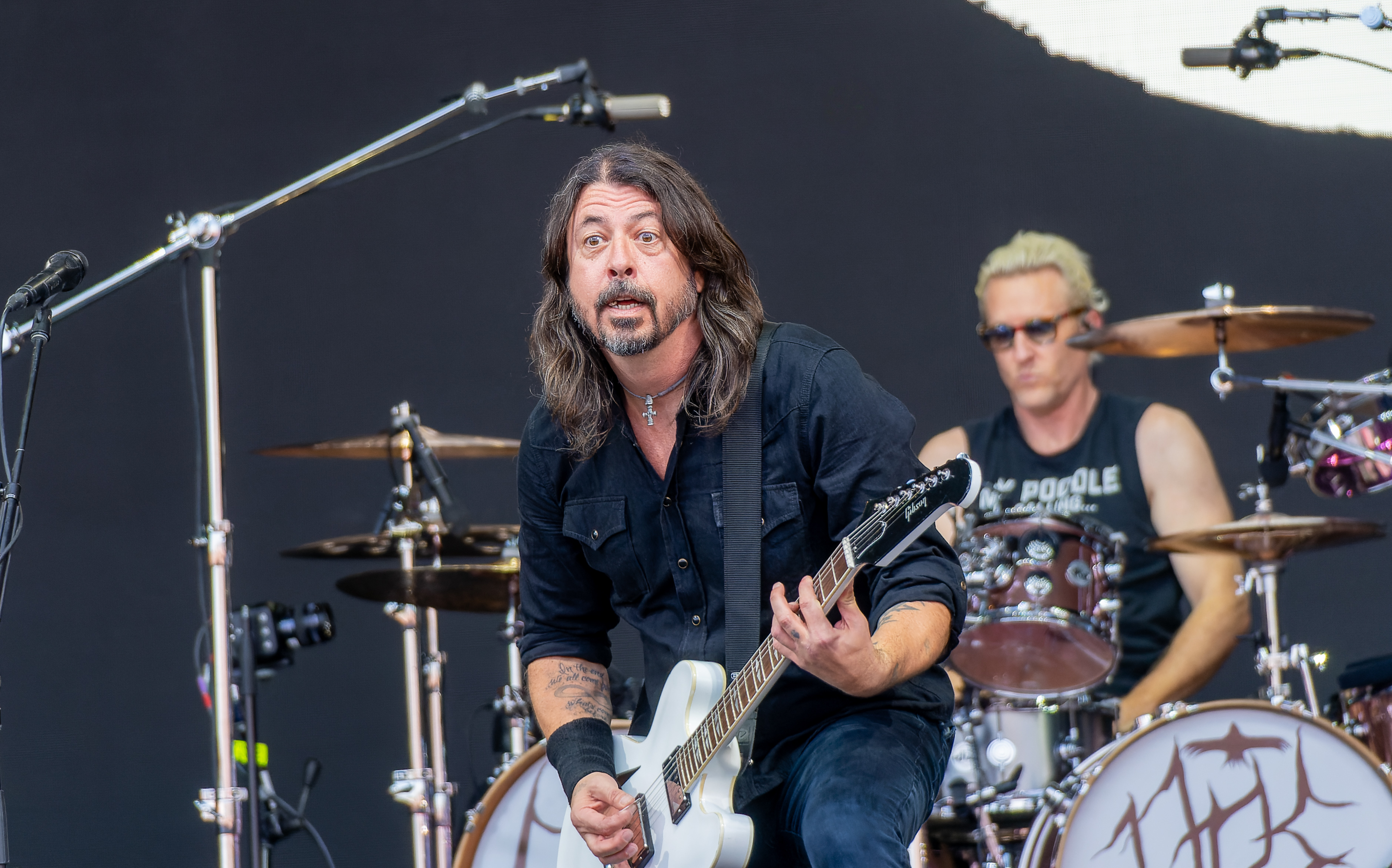
Freese (right) and Dave Grohl performing with Foo Fighters in 2023.

Freese appeared as one of several guest drummers for the Foo Fighters during a pair of concerts held in tribute to the band's former drummer Taylor Hawkins, who died on March 25, 2022, in London and Los Angeles in September 2022. In May 2023, the Foo Fighters introduced Freese as their full-time drummer during a streaming event titled "Preparing Music For Concerts". On May 16, 2025, Freese announced on social media that he was dismissed from the band without explanation. He told The New York Times in August 2025 that the band's music did not "really resonate" with him. Foo Fighters frontman Dave Grohl would eventually state in 2026 that Freese had been dismissed from the band, and that the decision did not "happen overnight." According to Grohl: "We called, as a band, all of us called, it wasn't just me. Basically, we called Josh and were, like, 'Hey, man, that was awesome. That was such a blast, thank you so much, but we are going to move on and find another drummer.'" Freese also expressed overwhelm regarding the purported high expectations associated with being "Dave Grohl's drummer" and "the guy that's supposed to save the day after the beloved Taylor Hawkins died."

=== Session and touring work ===
Throughout his career, Freese has performed as a session drummer on hundreds of recordings for dozens of artists, joking that his client list of popular musicians made him "the blue collar freelance drummer to the stars."

Among his early studio recordings as a session musician, Freese played on the Infectious Grooves album Sarsippius' Ark and the Suicidal Tendencies album The Art of Rebellion in 1992. He also played on the Human Cannonball (album) that was released in 1993 by School of Fish, being their second and final album, as well as two albums by the Korean group Seo Taiji and Boys' in 1994 and 1995. Additionally, he played some shows in early 1998 with the band 311 as a fill-in drummer for them on the Warped tour in Australia, Japan and Hawaii. Chad Sexton, 311's drummer had broken a hand just before a show in Australia early in the tour. Freese was already on the tour playing with the Vandals every day and played with both bands for the majority of the tour. In 1999, Freese drummed on Mike Ness' first solo album Cheating At Solitaire.

Among the notable albums Freese performed on in the 2000s are The Young and the Hopeless by Good Charlotte, Fallen by Evanescence, Let Go by Avril Lavigne, Thankful by Kelly Clarkson, Quebec by Ween, Next Level by Ayumi Hamasaki, and Crazy Love by Michael Bublé.

Freese's career as a session drummer has featured multiple enduring collaborations. He played on the Offspring's 2003 album Splinter after the departure of Ron Welty, played on several of the band's subsequent releases, and served as their touring drummer from 2021 to 2023 after they fired Pete Parada for refusing to get a COVID-19 vaccination.

Producer Bob Rock has worked frequently with Freese, and requested that he contribute drum tracks for Lostprophets' third album, Liberation Transmission. Freese has worked on and off with the Replacements frontman Paul Westerberg since 1992, including playing drums with the reunited Replacements from 2013 to 2015. Freese also provided the drums on two Replacements tracks that appear on their greatest-hits album Don't You Know Who I Think I Was.

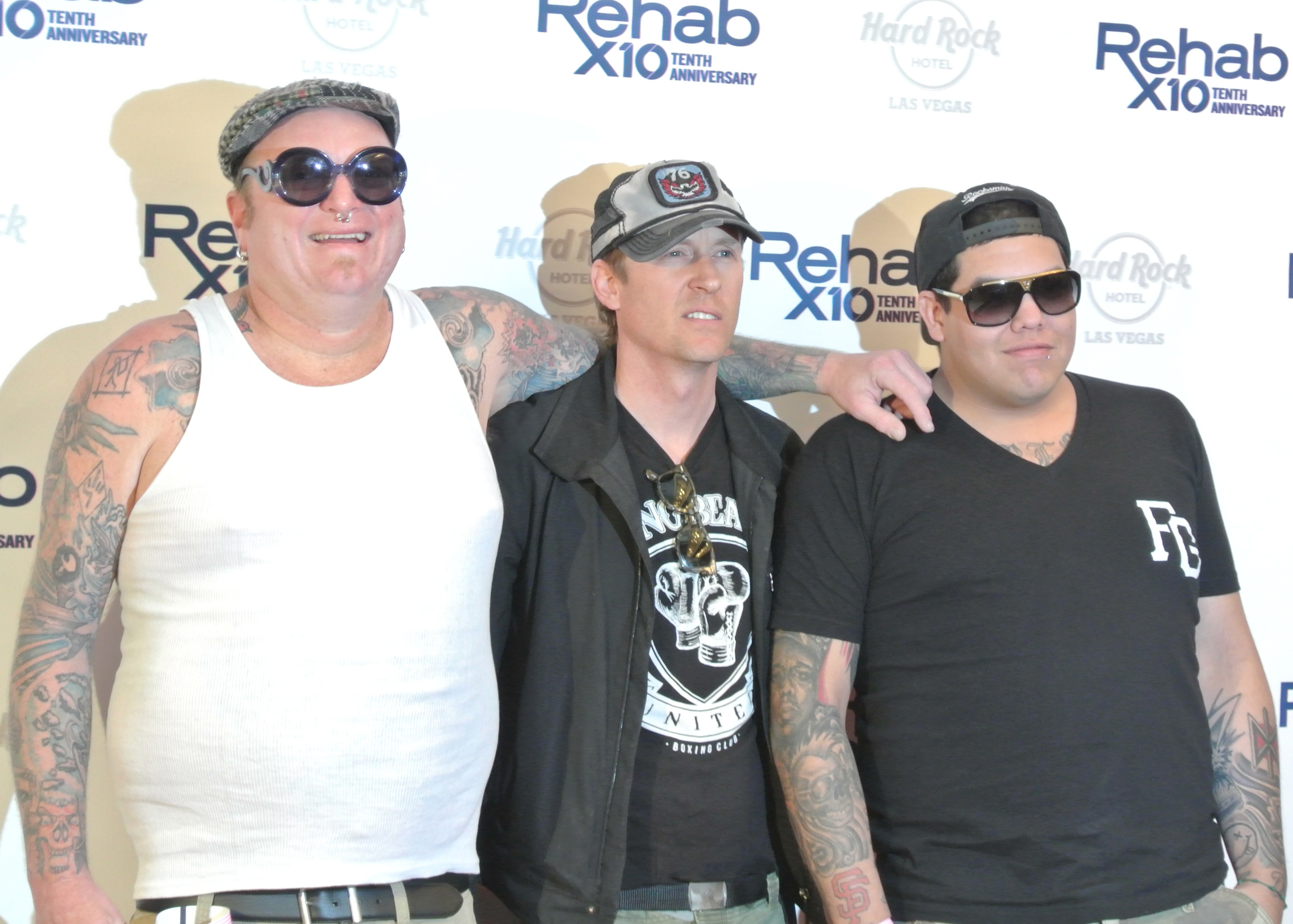
Freese (center) alongside his Sublime with Rome bandmates.

Beginning in 2005, Freese served as Sting's touring drummer and went on to appear on several of his studio recordings including the album 57th & 9th.

Freese served as Nine Inch Nails' touring drummer from 2005 to 2008 and performed on the group's 2007 album Year Zero and 2008 album The Slip. He left Nine Inch Nails at the end of 2008 in order to spend more time with his family and long-time girlfriend, who was pregnant with the couple's third child at the time. "With [Nine Inch Nails frontman] Trent [Reznor], I left on good terms because I was like, 'Listen, man, I don't have anything else lined up, I'm not leaving because this band over here offered me more money," Freese said. "I need to just go home and be a dad for a while, I need to be home for my family.' And he was like, 'Yeah, man, that's a totally noble, understandable reason.'" In July 2025, Nine Inch Nails announced that Freese would return to the touring lineup amid reports that drummer Ilan Rubin was leaving to perform with Foo Fighters, which had dismissed Freese weeks earlier.

Freese performed live with Weezer from 2009 to 2011, and again in November 2025, during which time Weezer drummer Patrick Wilson played guitar. Freese also played on the band's 2009 album Raditude. In 2011, Freese became the touring drummer for Paramore on the South American leg of their Brand New Eyes World Tour after the band announced the departure of the Farro brothers (Zac and Josh). The next year, Freese toured in 2012 with Sublime with Rome after Bud Gaugh announced his departure from the band.

Notable albums Freese appeared on as a session musician in the 2010s include Bruce Springsteen's High Hopes, Katy Perry's Teenage Dream, Kelly Clarkson's All I Ever Wanted and Stronger, Rascal Flatts' Rewind, and Lana Del Rey's Norman Fucking Rockwell! In 2022, he played drums with 100 Gecs as well as Danny Elfman at the Coachella Music & Arts Festival in Indio, California. Freese also performed in the studio with both artists, on Elfman's 2021 release Big Mess and 100 Gecs' second album, 2023's 10,000 Gecs.

=== Solo work ===
==== Early solo releases ====
In 1998, Freese recorded a number of songs that he wrote and performed himself (including bass, guitar, keyboards and vocals). The result is the lo-fi, 6-song EP Destroy Earth As Soon As Possible, released under the name 'Princess' by T.O.N/Stone Lizard Records.

In 2000, the songs "Caffeine and Vaseline" and "Rock N' Roll Chicken" were revived for the 12-song album The Notorious One Man Orgy; this time, the songs were released under Freese's own name by Kung Fu Records. Guest appearances include Stone Gossard, Warren Fitzgerald, Michael Ward, Lyle Workman, and Freese's brother Jason.

==== Since 1972 ====
Freese released his second solo album, Since 1972, via his website on March 24, 2009. Since 1972 was distributed similarly to the value-added packages offered by Nine Inch Nails's recent releases. The album was offered as a $7 digital download, and a $15 CD/DVD on his website. As a marketing stunt, the website offers unique incentive packages at prices up to $75,000. Publications covering the offer include SuicideGirls, the UK's The Guardian, NPR, and Boston Herald.

Of the novelty items for sale, Freese stated, "I'm not expecting to sell any of those ridiculously priced packages but I sure did get a lot of good press and attention to the fact that I'm putting out a record because of it! Mission accomplished."

==== Just a Minute ====
In 2020, after Freese's touring work came to a halt due to the COVID-19 pandemic, he recorded an album of one-minute songs at his home studio titled Just a Minute, Vol. 1. The album was released in 2021 by Pearl Jam guitarist Stone Gossard on his label Loosegroove Records. Taylor Hawkins, who Freese would go on to succeed in Foo Fighters, featured in a promotional video for the song "Heavy Metal Car Collection", which appeared on the album.

Freese released a follow up album of one minute songs, titled Just a Minute, Vol. 2, also on Gossard's label in 2025.

== Personal life ==
Freese married his wife Nicole on October 11, 2009, having been together since 1999. Freese lives in Southern California with Nicole and their four children—Hunter, August, Olive, and Lu Lu. He is the older brother of Jason Freese, a multi-instrumentalist session musician and longtime touring keyboardist and saxophonist for Green Day.

== Equipment ==
In a 2007 Guitar Center interview, Freese stated:

My set up never gets that crazy or out of the ordinary I don't think. You can pretty much always count on starting off with the basic Ringo 4 piece set up and add from there. With the Vandals that's all I use. With Devo add a second rack tom. With NIN keep only 1 rack but have 2 floors and a 3rd floor off to the left of my hi-hat (with NIN the drums are all about 2 inches bigger than I normally would use ... 14 rack. 24 kick, 18 and 20-inch floors ... 16 off the side of my hihat). With A Perfect Circle 2 racks and 2 floors, 2nd snare off the left of my hihat ... more cymbals with APC too. With Sting there are 3 racks but smaller sizes and only 1 floor. Never too many cymbals (except with APC I guess). In the studio my drums are usually something really basic a 4, 5, or 6 piece kit with lots of snare and cymbal choices.

== Discography ==
Solo discography

- Destroy Earth As Soon As Possible (1998, as "Princess")
- The Notorious One Man Orgy (2000)
- Since 1972 (2009)
- My New Friends (2011)
- Just a Minute, Volume 1 (2021)
