= Waste of Mind =

Studio album by Zebrahead
- Released: October 13, 1998
- Recorded: Early 1998
- Studio: The Gallery, Sherman Oaks, California; Sparky Dark, Calabasas, California; Image Recording Studio, Hollywood, California
- Genre: Rap rock; funk rock
- Length: 48:08
- Label: Columbia
- Producer: Howard Benson

Zebrahead chronology
Zebrahead (1998)	Waste of Mind (1998)	Playmate of the Year (2000)

Singles from Waste of Mind
- 1. "Get Back" Released: 1998; 2. "The Real Me" Released: 1999; 3. "Feel This Way" Released: 1999; 4. "Someday" Released: 1999

Professional ratings
Review scores
Source	Rating
AllMusic	3/5 stars
Pitchfork	7.2/10
Rock Hard	8.5/10

Waste of Mind is the second studio album and major label debut by American rock band Zebrahead, released in October 1998. The song "Check" was featured on the soundtrack of the video game Tony Hawk's Pro Skater 3.

== Track listing ==
No.	Title	Length
1.	"Check"	2:26
2.	"Get Back"	3:32
3.	"The Real Me"	3:57
4.	"Someday"	3:02
5.	"Waste of Mind"	3:32
6.	"Feel This Way"	3:44
7.	"Walk Away"	3:22
8.	"Big Shot"	3:00
9.	"Swing"	2:50
10.	"Jag Off"	3:25
11.	"Time"	3:10
12.	"Move On"	4:08
13.	"Fly Daze"	4:34
14.	"Bootylicious Vinyl"	3:26

Japanese edition bonus tracks
No.	Title	Length
15.	"Hate"	1:58
16.	"Song 10"	2:11

== Singles ==
- "Get Back" – released as the lead single from the album in late 1998, it sold over 150,000 copies alone in the United States and is currently the band's highest charting song yet, peaking at number 32 on the US Hot Modern Rock Tracks charts. The single was also released overseas in Australia, Japan and Canada, a music video accompanied its release.
- "The Real Me" – released as the second single in the US and Japan in early 1999, the majority of radio airplay of the song was received in California, US.
- "Feel This Way" – released as the third single from the album in the summer of 1999, exclusively in Japan.
- "Someday" – the third US and fourth and final single overall, received little airplay from radio stations, seeing as only a few copies were sent out during the late summer/early fall of 1999.

== Personnel ==
- Ali Tabatabaee – lead vocals
- Justin Mauriello – lead vocals, rhythm guitar
- Greg Bergdorf – lead guitar
- Ben Osmundson – bass guitar
- Ed Udhus – drums
- Howard Benson – producer, keyboards

== Charts ==
Charts	Peak position
US Top Heatseekers	34
