= The Early Years – Revisited =

Studio album by Zebrahead
- Released: April 21, 2015
- Recorded: 2013–15
- Length: 38:27
- Label: Rude
- Producer: Cameron Webb

Zebrahead chronology
Greatest Hits? – Volume 1 (2015)	The Early Years – Revisited (2015)	Walk the Plank (2015)

Singles from The Early Years – Revisited
- 1. "Devil on My Shoulder" Released: March 26, 2015

The Early Years – Revisited is the eleventh studio album by American punk rock band Zebrahead released on April 21, 2015. The album is made up of re-recorded tracks from the band's early years between 1998 and 2003 that feature then current lead vocalist and rhythm guitarist Matty Lewis and lead guitarist Dan Palmer, as opposed to former band members Justin Mauriello and Greg Bergdorf who featured on the original recordings.

The Early Years – Revisited was preceded by the single "Devil on My Shoulder", which was released March 26, 2015. A music video followed its release on the same day.

== Background ==
In February 2015, after the announcement of a greatest hits album for exclusive release in Japan featuring re-recorded songs as well as old material, Zebrahead confirmed the release of the re-recorded tracks in other global territories which would also feature the new song "Devil on My Shoulder" for an April 21, 2015 release.

== Track listing ==
No.	Title	Length
1.	"Check"	2:25
2.	"Get Back"	3:30
3.	"Jagoff"	3:26
4.	"Someday"	3:01
5.	"Playmate of the Year"	2:59
6.	"Now or Never"	3:00
7.	"Wasted"	3:26
8.	"Rescue Me"	3:18
9.	"Into You"	3:07
10.	"Hello Tomorrow"	3:57
11.	"Falling Apart"	3:09
12.	"Devil on My Shoulder" (featuring Jean-Ken Johnny of Man with a Mission)	3:03

CD edition track list
No.	Title	Length
12.	"Sex, Lies & Audiotape"	3:13
13.	"Devil on My Shoulder" (featuring Jean-Ken Johnny of Man with a Mission)	3:03
