= Waste of MFZB =

Studio album by Zebrahead
- Released: July 22, 2004
- Recorded: Spring / Summer 2003
- Studio: Shag Studios (Santa Ana, California)
- Length: 30:47
- Label: Sony Music International
- Producer: Cameron Webb

Zebrahead chronology
MFZB (2003)	Waste of MFZB (2004)	Broadcast to the World (2006)

Singles from Waste of MFZB
- 1. "Are You for Real?" Released: 2004

Released exclusively in Japan, Waste of MFZB is the fifth studio album released by American punk rock band Zebrahead. It is their final release featuring band member Justin Mauriello, who would soon leave the group.

As the title suggests, the album is made up of songs that never made the final cut of the band's previous release MFZB, except for "One Less Headache" and the cover of the song "Wannabe" by Spice Girls, which both were recorded during production for the band's third studio album Playmate of the Year.

== Track listing ==
No.	Title	Length
1.	"Are You for Real?"	3:23
2.	"Let Me Go"	2:58
3.	"One Less Headache"	3:13
4.	"Burn the School Down"	3:50
5.	"Lightning Rod"	3:39
6.	"Blindside"	3:00
7.	"Veils and Visions"	3:04
8.	"One Shot"	2:53
9.	"Timing Is Everything"	2:21
10.	"Wannabe" (Spice Girls cover)	2:29

Notes

- The song "Lightning Rod" features on the single for "Rescue Me" from the band's previous release MFZB, but under the title "Outcast."

== Singles ==
"Are You for Real?" - the only single released from the album. The majority of radio airplay received from the song was in Japan, a music video accompanied its release.

== Personnel ==
Zebrahead

- Ali Tabatabaee - lead vocals
- Justin Mauriello - lead vocals, rhythm guitar
- Greg Bergdorf - lead guitar
- Ben Osmundson - bass guitar
- Ed Udhus - drums

Art

- Jam Suzuki
- Takaaki Numano (MINDWRAP) (front cover)
- Jeff "Dirt" Conley (art concept)

== Charts ==
Chart	Peak position
Japan Oricon Albums Chart	16
