= Brain Invaders =

Studio album by Zebrahead
- Released: March 6, 2019
- Recorded: 2018
- Studio: BuzzBomb Sound Labs (Orange, California)
- Genres: Pop punk; heavy metal; punk rock
- Length: 44:05
- Labels: Avex Entertainment, MFZB
- Producer: Paul Miner

Zebrahead chronology
The Bonus Brothers (2017)	Brain Invaders (2019)	Wanna Sell Your Soul? (2020)

Singles from Brain Invaders
- 1. "All My Friends Are Nobodies" Released: January 8, 2019; 2. "We're Not Alright" Released: February 6, 2019; 3. "When Both Sides Suck, We're All Winners" Released: March 6, 2019; 4. "If You're Looking for Your Knife…I Think My Back Found It" Released: August 2, 2019

Professional ratings
Review scores
Source	Rating
Distorted Sound	6/10
Rock Hard	8/10

Brain Invaders is the thirteenth studio album by American punk rock band Zebrahead. It was released in Japan on March 6, 2019, and globally on March 8, 2019. The band announced the album on January 9, 2019, along with a music video for the album's first single, "All My Friends Are Nobodies". This is the first Zebrahead album to be self-released outside of Japan, as well as the final album with lead vocalist Matty Lewis before his departure from the group in 2021. A deluxe edition featuring bonus material was released on August 9, 2019, and an instrumental version was released on August 7, 2020. The song "All My Friends Are Nobodies" was later featured on the soundtrack of Tony Hawk's Pro Skater 1 + 2.

== Track listing ==
No.	Title	Length
1.	"When Both Sides Suck, We're All Winners"	3:03
2.	"I Won't Let You Down"	3:37
3.	"All My Friends Are Nobodies"	3:03
4.	"We're Not Alright"	2:55
5.	"You Don't Know Anything About Me"	2:44
6.	"Chasing the Sun"	3:12
7.	"Party on the Dancefloor"	3:09
8.	"Do Your Worst"	3:33
9.	"All Die Young"	3:15
10.	"Up in Smoke"	2:43
11.	"Ichi, Ni, San, Shi"	2:58
12.	"Take a Deep Breath (And Go Fuck Yourself)"	3:57
13.	"Better Living Through Chemistry"	2:39
14.	"Bullet on the Brain"	3:15

Japanese bonus track
No.	Title	Lyrics	Original performer	Length
15.	"Follow Me" (Japanese short version)	Shoko Fujibayashi	E-Girls	2:49

Deluxe edition bonus tracks
No.	Title	Length
15.	"If You're Looking for Your Knife… I Think My Back Found It"	3:20
16.	"All My Friends Are Nobodies" (Acoustic-ish)	3:34
17.	"We're Not Alright" (Acoustic-ish)	3:12

== Personnel ==
Zebrahead

- Ali Tabatabaee – lead vocals
- Matty Lewis – lead vocals, rhythm guitar
- Dan Palmer – lead guitar, backing vocals
- Ben Osmundson – bass guitar, backing vocals
- Ed Udhus – drums, percussion

== Charts ==
Chart (2019)	Peak position
Japanese Albums (Oricon)	40
UK Rock & Metal Albums (OCC)	31

== Release history ==
Territory	Date	Edition	Format
Japan	March 6, 2019	Standard	CD, DL, LP
Worldwide	March 8, 2019	Standard	CD, DL, LP
Worldwide	August 9, 2019	Deluxe	CD, DL, LP
