= Race to Red =

Studio album by Darling Thieves
- Released: June 17, 2010
- Genre: Alternative rock, pop punk, electronic rock
- Length: 34:20
- Label: Glassnote
- Producer: Justin Mauriello

Darling Thieves chronology
Embrace the Curse (2007)	Race to Red (2010)

Singles from Race to Red
- 1. "Free Without You" Released: January 12, 2010; 2. "Unspoken" Released: 30 November 2011

Professional ratings
Review scores
Source	Rating
Melodic.com	4.5/5 stars

Race to Red is an album released by alternative rock band Darling Thieves (formerly known as I Hate Kate). This is the second release by the band, following their first album entitled Embrace the Curse. This is the band's first album released under their new name. It was released on June 17, 2010. as a digital album only. It is only available on digital stores such as iTunes or Amazon.com and others.

== Track listing ==
All lyrics are written by Justin Mauriello.

No.	Title	Length
1.	"Unspoken"	3:07
2.	"Free without You"	3:25
3.	"Burn Down the Wall"	3:04
4.	"Final"	1:43
5.	"Ignore the Whisper"	3:17
6.	"In a Bad Way"	3:07
7.	"She Remains"	3:22
8.	"Race to Red"	3:57
9.	"Welcome To My World"	3:26
10.	"Another Day"	5:52

== Personnel ==
- Justin Mauriello– guitar, vocals
- Scott Hayden-bass guitar
- AJ Condosta– drums
