= Darling Thieves =

American alternative rock band

I Hate Kate
- Also known as: Darling Thieves (2010–2021)
- Origin: Huntington Beach, California
- Genres: Alternative rock, pop punk
- Years active: 2004–2012, 2012–present
- Label: Glassnote
- Members: Justin Mauriello; Scott Hayden; Mike Lund
- Past members: Jeremy Berghorst; AJ Condosta; Ed Davis; Rick Peterson
- Website: Facebook

I Hate Kate, also known as Darling Thieves, is an American alternative rock band from Huntington Beach, California, United States. The band was formed in November 2004 by former Zebrahead frontman Justin Mauriello.

== History ==
Justin Mauriello started I Hate Kate in 2004, while still in Zebrahead, as a creative outlet. The band has seen a steady rise in success. I Hate Kate played with bands such as Social Distortion, Chevelle, Hot Hot Heat, The Bravery, The Living End, My Chemical Romance, Unwritten Law, Secondhand Serenade, and Shiny Toy Guns. Tours have taken them throughout the U.S., Canada, and Japan.

In December 2007, the band with record producer Mark Trombino recorded new songs and remixed previous tracks. They released their first full-length album, Embrace the Curse, on June 24, 2008 under Glassnote Records. In early 2010, the band recorded an album entitled Race to Red, with producer Lee Miles. The band released the first single off the album, "Free Without You", on January 12, 2010. They have released music videos for "Free Without You" and "Unspoken".

In June 2010, a woman named Kate, after whom the band was named, left frontman Justin Mauriello an angry voicemail about the use of her name for the band, threatening legal action. The band felt it was in their best interest to change their name to Darling Thieves, under which name the new album was released on June 17, 2010.

As Darling Thieves they have headlined their own shows and shared the stage with The Smashing Pumpkins, Chevelle, OK Go, Anberlin, Flobots, and Hollywood Undead.

Darling Thieves went on a hiatus in 2012, while members of the band raised their children. During this haitus, Mauriello released a solo EP, How's Life In California?, recorded in Nashville, Tennessee. On March 16, 2016, the band debuted a new single, "Get It", their first release since The Extended Play EP, on a local radio station.

In 2021, the band would change their name back to I Hate Kate and release the singles "A Place For Me" and "Violently Alive". They would release the single "This Is What We're Living For" in 2024, featuring Delux. In 2025, they would release their single, "Here In This Crazy".

== Discography ==
=== Albums ===
as I Hate Kate

Date of release	Title
2006	Act One (EP)
April 4, 2007	Embrace The Curse
June 24, 2008	Embrace The Curse (re-release)

as Darling Thieves

Date of release	Title
June 17, 2010	Race to Red
March 13, 2012	The Extended Play (EP)

=== Singles ===
==== as I Hate Kate ====
- "Always Something" (2007)
- "It's Always Better" a.k.a. "Always Something" (2008)
- "Bed of Black Roses" (2008)
- "I'm In Love with a Sociopath" (2008)
- "A Place For Me" (2021)
- "Violently Alive" (2021)
- "This Is What We're Living For" featuring Delux (2024)
- "Here In This Crazy" (2025)

==== as Darling Thieves ====
- "Free Without You" (2010)
- "Unspoken" (2010)
- "Would You" (2012)
- "Rewrite" (Asian Kung-Fu Generation cover) (2012)
- "Get It" (2016)

==== Other songs (unreleased) ====
- "Sobriety Killed Society"
- "Jolly St.Nick Brought Me Dick"
- "Out On Me"
