= MFZB =

Studio album by Zebrahead
- Released: September 10, 2003 (Japan) October 21, 2003 (International)
- Recorded: Spring 2002 – April 2003
- Studios: NRG Recording Studios (North Hollywood, California); Maple Sound Studios (Santa Ana, California); Mad Dog Studios (Burbank, California)
- Genres: Punk rock; rapcore; pop punk
- Length: 56:04
- Label: Columbia
- Producers: Cameron Webb, Marshall Altman

Zebrahead chronology
Playmate of the Year (2000)	MFZB (2003)	Waste of MFZB (2004)

Singles from MFZB
- 1. "Into You" Released: 2003; 2. "Rescue Me" Released: January 20, 2004; 3. "Falling Apart" Released: 2004; 4. "Hello Tomorrow" Released: 2004

Professional ratings
Review scores
Source	Rating
Melodic	3/5 stars
Now	2/5 Ns
Rock Hard	8.5/10

MFZB (abbreviation of Motherfucking Zebrahead, Bitch) is the fourth studio album released by American punk rock band Zebrahead. "Rescue Me" was released to radio on January 20, 2004.

The title of the album originally comes from the band's fanclub of the same name. The first 1,000 copies of the American CD release were made available in four different colors; red, yellow, green and blue, the latter being the official color with later copies.

The songs "Falling Apart" and "Alone" were featured in the video game, WWE SmackDown! vs. Raw and its GameCube counterpart, WWE Day of Reckoning.

== Singles ==
- "Into You" - released as the lead single from the album in Japan in late 2003, its accompanied music video is a combination of concert and amateur "behind-the-scenes" footage from the band while on tour. It also has scenes with the band taking photo with fans and studio recording of the song.
- "Rescue Me" - released as the first single from the album in the U.S and second in Japan/ overall in early 2004, its accompanied music video is recorded footage of the band performing the song at a concert.
- "Falling Apart" - released as a radio-only single in spring 2004.
- "Hello Tomorrow'" - the fourth and final single off the album as released in the summer of 2004, a music video accompanied its release.

== Track listing ==
No.	Title	Length
1.	"Rescue Me"	3:20
2.	"Over the Edge"	2:46
3.	"Strength"	3:26
4.	"Hello Tomorrow"	4:04
5.	"The Set-Up"	3:16
6.	"Blur"	3:39
7.	"House Is Not My Home"	3:21
8.	"Into You"	3:10
9.	"Alone"	2:19
10.	"Expectations"	3:43
11.	"Falling Apart"	3:10
12.	"Let It Ride"	3:09
13.	"Type A"	2:12
14.	"Runaway"	3:22
15.	"Dear You (Far Away)" (Hidden track "The Fear" plays at 4:38)	7:23

Japanese bonus tracks
No.	Title	Length
16.	"Surrender" (Cheap Trick cover)	3:08
17.	"Good Things"	3:03
18.	"Dissatisfied"	3:08

== Personnel ==
- Ali Tabatabaee – lead vocals
- Justin Mauriello – lead vocals, rhythm guitar
- Greg Bergdorf – lead guitar, backing vocals
- Ben Osmundson – bass guitar, backing vocals
- Ed Udhus – drums, percussion
