= My New Friends =

EP by Josh Freese
- Released: April 1, 2011
- Recorded: Long Beach, CA
- Genre: Rock, punk rock
- Length: 14:40
- Label: Outerscope

Josh Freese chronology
Since 1972 (2009)	My New Friends (2011)

My New Friends is the third solo release by drummer Josh Freese. The EP consisted of songs written about the people Freese met by way of the price packages on his previous release.

== Track listing ==
All tracks are written by Josh Freese.

No.	Title	Length
1.	"You And Me And The Tuba Tree"	2:05
2.	"All The Way From F.L.A."	4:03
3.	"See You In 2010"	3:07
4.	"The Best That I Could Do"	3:11
5.	"NY Style Eddie"	2:14
