= Get Nice! (album) =

Studio album by Zebrahead
- Released: July 27, 2011
- Recorded: Late 2010 – Early 2011
- Genres: Pop punk; rap rock
- Length: 49:22
- Label: Niji
- Producer: Jason Freese

Zebrahead chronology
Panty Raid (2009)	Get Nice! (2011)	Call Your Friends (2013)

Singles from Get Nice!
- 1. "Ricky Bobby" Released: June 10, 2011; 2. "Get Nice!" Released: July 9, 2011

Professional ratings
Review scores
Source	Rating
Alter The Press!	4/5 stars
Rock Hard	7.5/10
Rock Sound	8/10 stars

Get Nice! is the ninth studio album released by American punk rock band Zebrahead. It is the band's first album to feature original material since the release of their seventh studio album Phoenix in 2008. It is the last album to feature Greg Bergdorf as lead guitarist after his departure in 2013.

== Singles and music videos ==
- "Ricky Bobby" – Released June 10, 2011 as the lead single from the album; a music video accompanied its release.
- "Get Nice!" – Released on July 9, 2011 as the second single; a music video accompanied its release in two versions: "clean" and "1970s", with the latter edited to make it look like it was filmed on TV cameras from the 1970s. Everything else in the video is identical to its "clean" version.
- "She Don't Wanna Rock" – A music video for the song was released on September 26, 2011.
- "Blackout" – A music video for the song was released November 30, 2011. The video is composed of footage from Zebrahead's tour in France.
- "Nudist Priest" – A music video for the song was released December 21, 2011. The video is composed of footage from Zebrahead's tour in England.
- "Truck Stops and Tail Lights" – A music video for the song was released January 16, 2012. The video is composed of footage from Zebrahead's tour in Germany.
- "Nothing to Lose" – A music video for the song was released June 8, 2012. The video is composed of footage from Zebrahead's tour in the UK.

== Track listing ==
No.	Title	Length
1.	"Blackout"	3:45
2.	"Nothing to Lose"	3:53
3.	"She Don't Wanna Rock"	3:09
4.	"Ricky Bobby"	2:42
5.	"Get Nice!"	3:23
6.	"The Joke's on You"	3:03
7.	"Nudist Priest"	3:38
8.	"Galileo Was Wrong"	3:15
9.	"Truck Stops and Tail Lights"	3:22
10.	"I'm Definitely Not Gonna Miss You"	3:48
11.	"Too Bored to Bleed"	3:58
12.	"Kiss Your Ass Goodbye"	4:10
13.	"This Is Gonna Hurt You Way More Than It's Gonna Hurt Me"	4:03
14.	"Demon Days"	3:05

Japanese bonus tracks
No.	Title	Length
15.	"Light Up the Sky"	3:45
16.	"A Freak Gasoline Fight Accident"	3:08

== Personnel ==
- Ali Tabatabaee – lead vocals
- Matty Lewis – lead vocals, rhythm guitar
- Greg Bergdorf – lead guitar
- Ben Osmundson – bass guitar
- Ed Udhus – drums
- Jason Freese – keyboards, production

== Release history ==
Country	Date	Format
Japan	July 27, 2011	CD, digital download
Australia & Europe	July 29, 2011	Digital download
Australia & Europe	August 5, 2011	CD
United States	August 2, 2011	Digital download
United States	August 16, 2011	CD
South America	September 27, 2011	CD, digital download
