= Get Back (Zebrahead song) =

Single by Zebrahead

from the album Waste of Mind
- Released: 1998
- Recorded: 1998
- Genre: Nu metal, rap metal
- Length: 3:32
- Label: Columbia
- Songwriter: Zebrahead
- Producer: Howard Benson

Zebrahead singles chronology
"Get Back" (1998)	"The Real Me" (1999)

Music video
- "Get Back" on YouTube

Get Back is a song by American punk rock band Zebrahead from their second and major label debut album Waste of Mind which was released on 1998. When the song was released it became a minor hit on the radio and charted #32 on the US Modern Rock Tracks. It's the first and only song so far to be charted on a US Billboard chart from Zebrahead and also is the best known.

== Music video ==
The music video features the band on the final floor of a building (presumably a hotel or apartment building) and then while performing the song they fall through the other floors of the building.

== Track listing ==
US version

1. "Get Back" – 3:32
2. "Swing" – 2:50
3. "Check" – 2:26

Canadian version

1. "Get Back" – 3:32
2. "The Real Me" – 3:57
3. "Check" – 2:26

Australian version

1. "Get Back" – 3:32
2. "Hate" – 1:58
3. "Song 10" – 2:11

== Chart positions ==
Chart (1998)	Peak position
US Modern Rock Tracks (Billboard)	32
