= Zebrahead =

American rock band

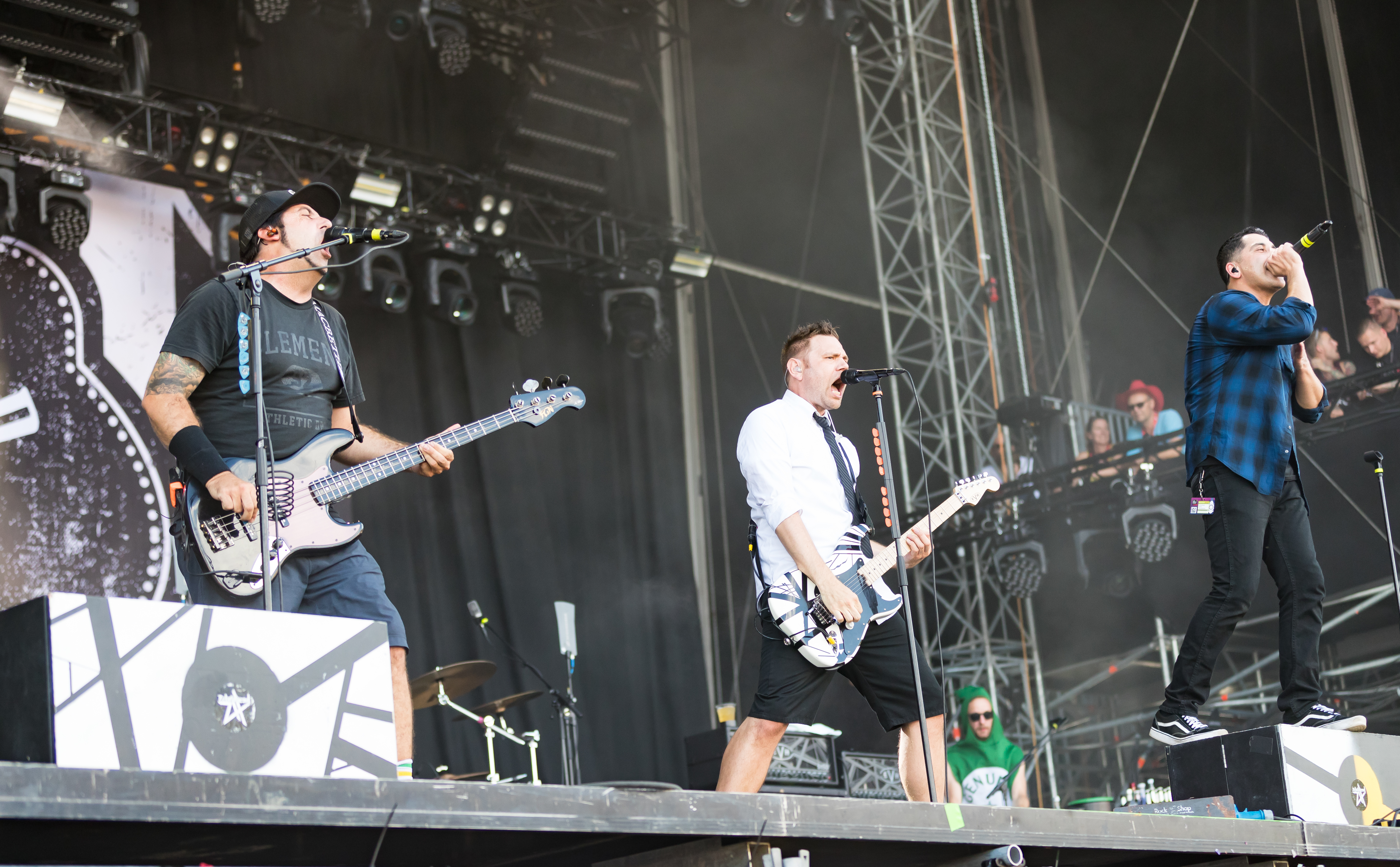
- Zebrahead performing in 2017

Background information
- Origin: La Habra, California, U.S.
- Genres: Punk rock; pop-punk; rap rock; rapcore
- Years active: 1996–present
- Labels: MFZB; Avex; EMI; Fontana; Sony Japan; Granted; Rude; 3wise; Icon; Columbia; Doctor Dream
- Spinoffs: Darling Thieves: Rocketsuit Rogue; Fear No Empire
- Members: Ben Osmundson; Ed Udhus; Ali Tabatabaee; Dan Palmer; Adrian Estrella
- Past members: Justin Mauriello; Greg Bergdorf; Matty Lewis
- Website: zebrahead.com

Zebrahead is an American rock band from La Habra, California, formed in 1996. The group's current line-up comprises rapper Ali Tabatabaee, bassist Ben Osmundson, drummer Ed Udhus, lead guitarist Dan Palmer and lead vocalist and rhythm guitarist Adrian Estrella. Playing a style of music that merges elements of pop-punk and hip-hop, they have released thirteen studio albums.

The band was formed in 1996 by Tabatabaee, Osmundson and Udhus, as well as vocalist and rhythm guitarist Justin Mauriello and lead guitarist Greg Bergdorf. Mauriello departed from the group in 2004, following the release of the band's fifth studio album Waste of MFZB. His role was filled in 2005, with the addition of Matty Lewis, who made his debut on Broadcast to the World (2006). Bergdorf then departed from the group in 2013, being replaced by Palmer, who was first featured on Call Your Friends (2013). In 2021, Lewis left the band and was replaced by Estrella. To date, the band have sold three million records worldwide.

== History ==
=== 1996–2001: Formation and early years ===
Zebrahead's logo

In summer 1996 in La Habra, California, guitarist Greg Bergdorf and drummer Ed Udhus (both formerly of the band 409), bassist Ben Osmundson (formerly of 3-Ply) and singer/rhythm guitarist Justin Mauriello (formerly of Once There) all became acquainted with one another after experimenting with different music styles together, as the bands they were in at the time shared the same practice space. Subsequently, all four left their respective bands to form their own, which they named Zebrahead. Inspired by bands such as Fugazi and Descendents and uninterested in the local musical trends of the time, Zebrahead began experimenting and incorporating elements of hip-hop into their sound, leading to the inclusion of rapper Ali Tabatabaee as a co-vocalist. The first song ever composed was "Check", which was later included on their first demo tape, One More Hit, released shortly after.

The band issued their self-titled debut album in April 1998 through indie label Doctor Dream Records, before signing with major label Columbia Records to release their mainstream debut Waste of Mind later that year. The album contains several re-recorded songs from their demo release alongside new tracks, including the minor radio hit "Get Back", which charted at No. 32 on the U.S. Hot Modern Rock Tracks charts. This album's version of "Check" also appeared on the soundtrack for the game Tony Hawk's Pro Skater 3.

The band's follow-up Playmate of the Year was released in August 2000 and charted at No.4 on the U.S. Top Heatseekers chart. The extended play Stupid Fat Americans followed in February 2001 as a Japan-exclusive release.

=== 2002–2005: MFZB and Mauriello's departure ===
Zebrahead recorded and released their fourth studio album, MFZB, in 2003; this was their last publication under Columbia Records. The album is noted for trading in the hip-hop funk elements of the band's previous releases in favor of a heavier punk rock sound that would eventually carry over and develop in future releases. Zebrahead spent the majority of 2004 promoting the album at various festivals in Japan, including the Summer Sonic Festival. The band's extensive touring earned them a sizeable fanbase in the country, leading MFZB to chart at No.9 on the Japanese Charts and earn a gold certification. A follow-up to MFZB titled Waste of MFZB – containing songs that didn't make the final cut of the former – was released exclusively in Japan in July 2004 where it topped the Billboard Japan chart.

Shortly after Zebrahead's Japanese tour, co-vocalist/rhythm guitarist Justin Mauriello left the band due to creative differences. As the singing/rapping dynamic between Mauriello and co-vocalist Ali Tabatabaee was crucial to Zebrahead's sound, the band immediately began the search for a replacement. Matty Lewis, a former member of the band Jank 1000 that had previously toured with Zebrahead, was advised by Udhus and Osmundson to try out for the part in December 2004, to which he won. Lewis' inclusion was announced at a private concert at the Anaheim House of Blues, California on March 8, 2005, before the group started recording their next studio album.

=== 2006–2012: Broadcast to the World, Phoenix, Panty Raid and Get Nice! ===
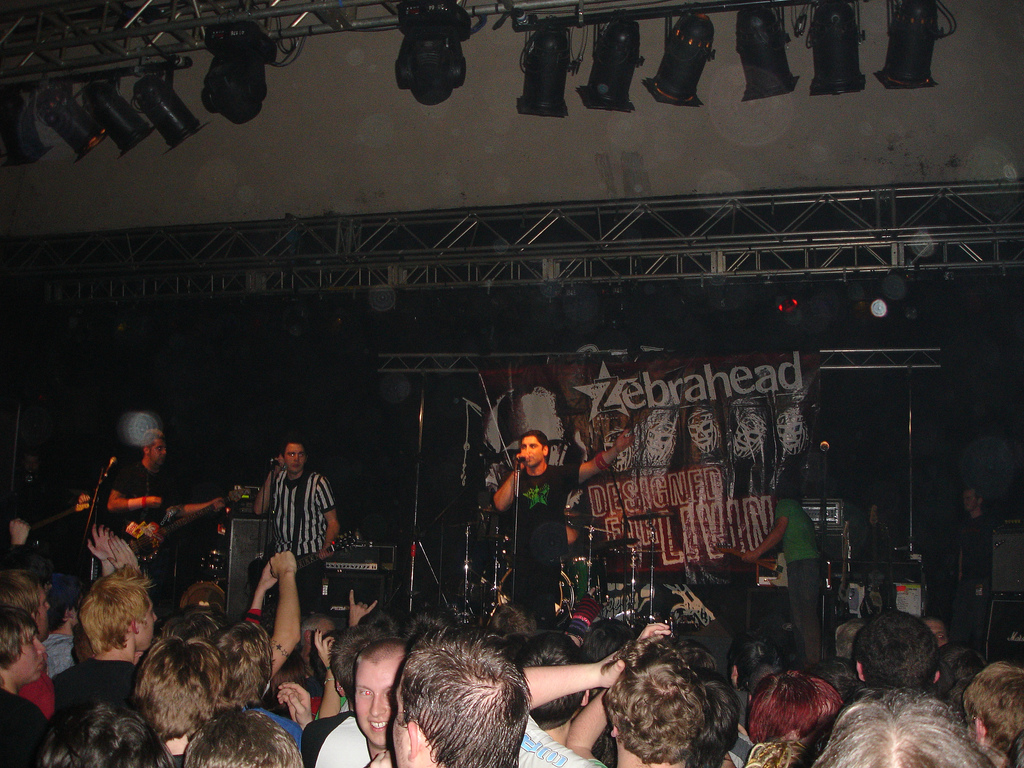
Zebrahead performing in 2006

Zebrahead's sixth album Broadcast to the World debuted in February 2006 in Japan, where it certified gold. It was later issued in other countries as the year progressed. During that time, the band toured the U.S. as part of the Warped Tour festival and later Europe, notably playing at the UK's annual Download Festival. Ali Tabatabaee and Matty Lewis also performed the theme of Sonic the Hedgehog (2006), "His World".

Following a two-month hiatus after writing material for their seventh album, Zebrahead returned to Europe in May 2007 on a co-headline tour with MxPx and went on to tour the UK as part of the annual Get Happy Tour the following October. Afterwards, the band continued writing and recorded demos with producers Jason Freese, Howard Benson and Cameron Webb. The album, Phoenix, was released in July 2008, preceded by the Not the New Album EP a day earlier. The band later returned to the UK and performed at the Download, Leeds Slam Dunk and Greenfield festivals, before going on to tour the rest of Europe and Japan for the remainder of the year. An American leg of the tour was originally planned to take place after, however, Lewis became ill, and in order to avoid permanent damage to his voice, the tour was cancelled.

In Spring 2009, Zebrahead announced the release of a cover album featuring songs originally sung by female musicians from the 1990s–2000s for the following November. Panty Raid is preceded by the single "Girlfriend" originally by Avril Lavigne. To promote it, the band began the Less Than Jake tour in late 2009 and toured through Japan and Europe, eventually concluding in the U.S. in Spring 2010. In the fall that followed, the band had started recording original material for the first time since the release of Phoenix. Proceeded by the singles "Ricky Bobby" and the title track "Get Nice!", Zebrahead's ninth studio album Get Nice! was released in July 2011, reaching No. 3 on the U.S. Top Heatseekers chart. Promotion came in the form of the tour Get Nice! or Die Trying, where the band performed in venues and festivals throughout Europe, Japan and Australia and the United States between the album's release and the summer of 2012.

=== 2013–2020: Call Your Friends, Walk the Plank and Brain Invaders ===
After recording in the first half of the year, Zebrahead's tenth studio album Call Your Friends was released worldwide in August 2013. Around the same time, the band announced the departure of guitarist Greg Bergdorf, who chose to leave in order to spend more time with his family. Lead guitarist of Death by Stereo, Dan Palmer took his place as the band's new guitarist. Zebrahead then toured in the U.S., Europe and Japan over the course of the following year, this time alongside acts MxPx and Allister. In October 2014, the band released their live DVD Way More Beer, which was filmed and recorded during the band's tour of Germany earlier that year.

In celebration of the twentieth anniversary of Zebrahead's formation, the band released their first compilation album Greatest Hits? – Volume 1 on March 11, 2015, exclusively in Japan. As well as familiar material, the compilation features several re-recorded songs from the band's earlier albums with former lead singer/rhythm guitarist Justin Mauriello, this time featuring current lead Matty Lewis. The re-recorded songs were released separately outside Japan as the band's eleventh studio album under the title The Early Years – Revisited on April 21, 2015.

After recording earlier in the year, Zebrahead's twelfth album Walk the Plank was issued on October 7, 2015. A continuation of their Walk the Plank/Out of Control tour that took place earlier that year ran between October 1 – December 11, 2015, in Japan and Europe. The band released a second compilation album on November 24, 2017, titled The Bonus Brothers, featuring songs that were previously only available on the Japanese editions of their albums, while their thirteenth studio album Brain Invaders was released in March 2019.

=== 2021–present: Lewis' departure and III.II.I.O ===
In April 2021, Zebrahead announced the departure of co-lead vocalist and rhythm guitarist, Matty Lewis. Adrian Estrella (Assuming We Survive and Mest) was revealed as his replacement on June 28, 2021. The band's first single with Estrella, "Lay Me to Rest", premiered the following month on July 30, 2021 while the EP III, the band's first release with Estrella, followed on November 26, 2021. The band's follow-up EP, titled II, was released on February 3, 2023. I was released on November 13, 2024. O was released on August 12, 2026.

== Musical style ==
Zebrahead's music is generally classified as rapcore, rap rock, pop-punk, alternative rock, and punk rock in general. Other labels that are likened to their sound are rap metal and nu metal. The band incorporates elements of ska punk.

AllMusic described Zebrahead's music as punk rap, and also said that they are a rap rock group that "[owes] far more to the old school than the new". Faster, Louder categorized them as "pop-punk/rapcore exponents". The Boston Phoenix said that the band "combined the pop-punk cuteness of Blink-182 with the rap-metal aggression of Limp Bizkit." New Noise Magazine described the band as "punch you in the face punk rock."

== Band members ==
Current members

- Ali Tabatabaee – lead vocals (1996–present)
- Ben Osmundson – bass, backing vocals (1996–present)
- Ed Udhus – drums, percussion (1996–present)
- Dan Palmer – lead guitar, backing vocals (2013–present; 2010, 2012 touring substitute for Greg Bergdorf)
- Adrian Estrella – lead vocals, rhythm guitar (2021–present)

Current session/touring musicians

- Jason Freese – keyboards, piano (2006–present)
- John Christianson – trumpet (2006–present; occasional live performances)

Former members

- Justin Mauriello – lead vocals, rhythm guitar (1996–2004)
- Greg Bergdorf – lead guitar, backing vocals (1996–2013)
- Matty Lewis – lead vocals, rhythm guitar (2005–2021)

Former touring/session musicians

- Howard Benson – keyboards (1998–2000, 2008)
- Dan Regan – trombone (2006–2014; occasional live performances)
- Chris Dalley – drums (2008; substitute for Ed Udhus)

== Discography ==
- Zebrahead (1998)
- Waste of Mind (1998)
- Playmate of the Year (2000)
- MFZB (2003)
- Waste of MFZB (2004)
- Broadcast to the World (2006)
- Phoenix (2008)
- Panty Raid (2009)
- Get Nice! (2011)
- Call Your Friends (2013)
- The Early Years – Revisited (2015)
- Walk the Plank (2015)
- Brain Invaders (2019)
- III.II (2023)
- I.O. (2026)
