= Playmate of the Year (album) =

Studio album by Zebrahead
- Released: August 2, 2000 (Japan) August 22, 2000 (International)
- Recorded: January–April 2000
- Studios: The Gallery, Sherman Oaks, California; Sparky Dark, Calabasas, California
- Genres: Pop-punk; rap rock
- Length: 50:21
- Label: Columbia
- Producer: Howard Benson

Zebrahead chronology
Waste of Mind (1998)	Playmate of the Year (2000)	MFZB (2003)

Singles from Playmate of the Year
- 1. "Deck the Halls (I Hate Christmas)" Released: 1999; 2. "Playmate of the Year" Released: 2000; 3. "Now or Never" Released: 2001

Professional ratings
Review scores
Source	Rating
AllMusic	3/5 stars
Rock Hard	8.5/10

Playmate of the Year is the third studio album by American rock band Zebrahead, released on August 22, 2000, via Columbia Records.

The woman modelling on the album cover is American model and actress Jodi Ann Paterson who was a Playboy Playmate in 1999 and named Playmate of the Year in 2000, of which the album refers to.

Exclaim! described the musical style of the album as a cross between the "rapping punk of Limp Bizkit and the pop punk of Lit."

== Singles ==
- "Deck the Halls (I Hate Christmas)" – released as a festive single during the Christmas season of 1999 and received airplay from many radio stations in the U.S. and Japan.
- "Playmate of the Year" – the title track of the album was released as the lead single in the summer of 2000 and received radio airplay worldwide, a music video accompanied its release in censored and uncensored versions. The video is also available as one of the extras on the Playboy 2001 Video Playmate Calendar.

In the beginning of the video the band wakes up in their apartment from the doorbell of a crowd of women with which the musicians later have fun. At the end of the video Justin Mauriello wakes up again, realizing that it was just a dream, then he opens the door to the postman, that gives him the new issue of journal "Playboy".

- "Now or Never" – released exclusively as a radio-only single in Japan in 2001.

== Track listing ==
No.	Title	Length
1.	"I Am"	3:01
2.	"Playmate of the Year"	2:58
3.	"Now or Never"	3:00
4.	"Wasted" (hidden demo track "Place in France" plays at 3:29)	3:54
5.	"I'm Money"	3:53
6.	"Go"	3:23
7.	"What's Goin' On?"	4:01
8.	"Subtract You"	2:59
9.	"The Hell That Is My Life" (hidden demo track "Wookie" plays at 3:34)	4:00
10.	"E Generation"	2:44
11.	"Livin' Libido Loco"	4:47
12.	"In My Room" (Tavis Werts of Reel Big Fish performing on didgeridoo plays at 3:35 and prank call plays at 8:41)	11:35

Japanese bonus tracks
No.	Title	Length
13.	"All I Need"	3:08
14.	"Deck the Halls (I Hate Christmas)"	10:15

European bonus track
No.	Title	Length
13.	"Get Back"	3:31

Notes

- The actual song from the track "In My Room" is 3:32 long, before being followed by about a minute of Reel Big Fish band member Tavis Werts playing the didgeridoo, followed by about five minutes of silence. At 8:41, a prank call to Sony BMG is played, the call is made by band member Justin Mauriello impersonating his mother, demanding to know when the band is going to "start seeing some money" from their record label.

== Personnel ==
Zebrahead

- Ali Tabatabaee – lead vocals
- Justin Mauriello – lead vocals, rhythm guitar
- Greg Bergdorf – lead guitar
- Ben Osmundson – bass guitar
- Ed Udhus – drums

Backing staff

- Howard Benson – keyboards
- Chris Lord-Alge – mixing
- Bobby Brooks – engineer
- Ernie Vigil; Mat Silva – assistant engineers
- Gavin Lurssen – mastering

== Chart positions ==
Charts	Peak position
Top Heatseekers	4
US Charts	127
Japan Charts	20
