= Phoenix (Zebrahead album) =

Studio album by Zebrahead
- Released: July 9, 2008
- Recorded: March–May 2008
- Studios: Maple, Santa Ana, California
- Genres: Pop punk, rap rock
- Length: 55:02
- Label: Icon Mes
- Producers: Cameron Webb, Howard Benson

Zebrahead chronology
Broadcast to the World (2006)	Phoenix (2008)	Panty Raid (2009)

Singles from Phoenix
- 1. "Mental Health" Released: 2008; 2. "Hell Yeah!" Released: 2008; 3. "The Juggernauts" Released: 2009

Professional ratings
Review scores
Source	Rating
AllMusic	3/5 stars
Alternative Press	3/5
Rock Hard	8/10

Phoenix is the seventh studio album released by American punk rock band Zebrahead. Shawn Harris of The Matches created the artwork for the album, as he did with the band's previous album Broadcast to the World. Phoenix was made available for streaming via Fuse's website on July 31, 2008, before being released on August 5, 2008 through Icon Mes. The band was due to embark on a US tour in August and September 2008, but had to cancel it when frontman Matty Lewis started suffering from vocal issues. They ended up going on a tour of mainland Europe in October 2008.

== Singles ==
- "Mental Health" - released as the lead single from the album in June 2008. It peaked at number 16 on the Japanese charts, a music video accompanied its release.
- "Hell Yeah!" - released as the second single in the fall of 2008; a music video accompanied its release.
- "The Juggernauts" - released as the third and final single in winter–spring 2009; a music video accompanied its release.

The video was filmed in the summer of 2008. The video shows the band members playing at the swimming pool with a large number of visitors on holiday. At the end of the video, the band start to play the song under the water.

== Track listing ==
No.	Title	Length
1.	"HMP"	3:01
2.	"Hell Yeah!"	3:36
3.	"Just the Tip"	3:16
4.	"Mental Health"	3:13
5.	"The Juggernauts"	3:58
6.	"Death by Disco"	3:23
7.	"Be Careful What You Wish For"	3:11
8.	"Morse Code for Suckers"	3:49
9.	"Ignite"	3:26
10.	"Mike Dexter Is a God, Mike Dexter Is a Role Model, Mike Dexter Is an Asshole"	3:36
11.	"The Junkie and the Halo"	3:28
12.	"Brixton"	3:07
13.	"Hit the Ground"	3:20
14.	"Two Wrongs Don't Make a Right, But Three Rights Make a Left"	3:32
15.	"All for None and None for All"	3:16
16.	"Sorry, But Your Friends Are Hot"	3:50

Japanese bonus tracks
No.	Title	Length
17.	"The Art of Breaking Up"	3:18
18.	"We're Not a Cover Band, We're a Tribute Band"	3:48

Bonus Fan Club Edition
No.	Title	Length
17.	"Politics"	3:08
18.	"Photographs"	3:23

"Politics" and "Photographs" were first released (in reverse playing order) on the digital exclusive Not the New Album EP, included alongside "Mental Health" as an album sampler. This EP released on July 8th through Icon MES, one day before the album proper, but was re-released on January 31st, 2010 through the band's own MFZB Records, including the two Japanese bonus tracks alongside the first three.

The version of Phoenix available to fan club members is the only instance of "Politics" and "Photographs" being available on physical media.

== Personnel ==
Band

- Ali Tabatabaee - lead vocals
- Matty Lewis - lead vocals, rhythm guitar
- Greg Bergdorf - lead guitar
- Ben Osmundson - bass guitar
- Ed Udhus - drums

Backing staff

- Jason Freese - keyboards
- Howard Benson - keyboards on "Hell Yeah!"
- Cameron Webb - mixing, engineer
- Mike Plotnikoff - engineer
- Brian Gardner - mastering

== Trivia ==
- "HMP" stands for Heavy Metal Push-Ups and according to the band the name came about because playing the song gave their fingers a workout.
- "Mike Dexter is a God, Mike Dexter is a Role Model, Mike Dexter is an Asshole" is a reference to the character Mike Dexter from the movie Can't Hardly Wait.

== Chart positions ==
Charts	Peak position
Top Heatseekers	30
Japan Charts	10

== Release history ==
Region	Date	Format
Japan	July 9, 2008	CD, music download
Europe	August 4, 2008	CD, music download
Canada	August 5, 2008	CD, music download
United States	August 5, 2008	CD, music download
World wide	March 28, 2014	Vinyl record
