= Zebrahead (album) =

Studio album by Zebrahead
- Released: April 21, 1998
- Studio: The Gallery (Sherman Oaks, California)
- Genre: Rap rock, funk metal
- Length: 26:24
- Label: Doctor Dream
- Producer: Howard Benson

Zebrahead chronology
One More Hit (1996)	Zebrahead (1998)	Waste of Mind (1998)

Singles from Zebrahead
- 1. "Check" Released: 1998

Professional ratings
Review scores
Source	Rating
AllMusic	2/5 stars

Zebrahead, more commonly known as Yellow or The Yellow Album, is the debut studio album by American punk rock band Zebrahead. The songs "Check" and "Hate" are both re-recorded from their One More Hit demo tape released two years prior in 1996. Most of the songs on the album would end up re-recorded later and released as part of the band's follow-up and first mainstream album, Waste of Mind. The song "Check" would therefore end up re-recorded twice so far.

== Singles ==
"Check" is the only known single from the album and was accompanied by a music video.

== Track listing ==
No.	Title	Length
1.	"Check"	2:14
2.	"All I Need"	3:09
3.	"Swing"	2:38
4.	"Walk Away"	3:18
5.	"Bootylicious Vinyl"	3:27
6.	"Hate"	1:59
7.	"Mindtrip"	2:15
8.	"Chrome"	2:43
9.	"Jagoff" (live)	3:31
10.	"Song 10"	2:10

== Personnel ==
- Ali Tabatabaee – lead vocals
- Justin Mauriello – lead vocals, rhythm guitar
- Greg Bergdorf – lead guitar
- Ben Osmundson – bass guitar
- Ed Udhus – drums
