= Jason Freese =

American musician

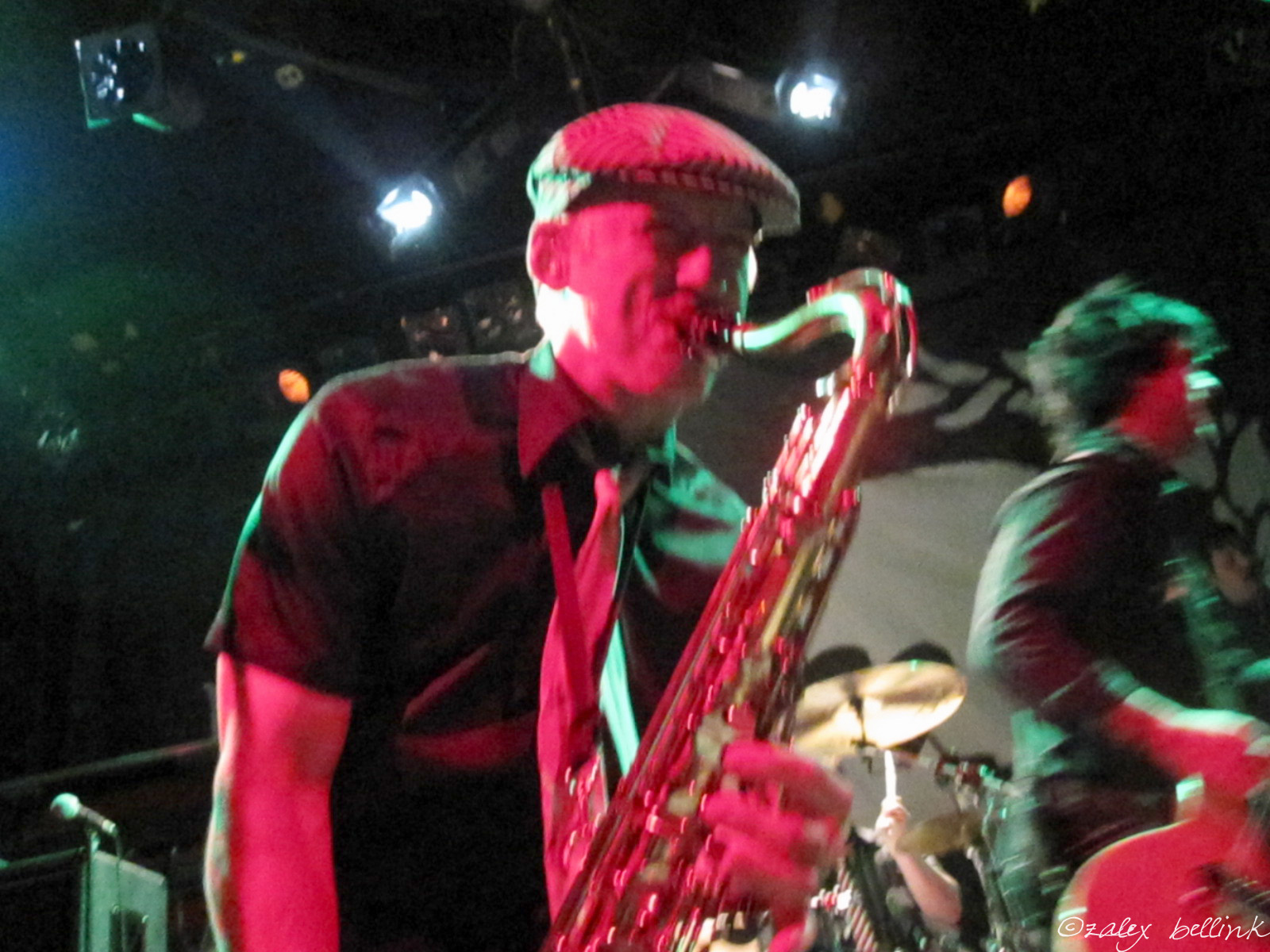
- Freese performing with Green Day in 2009

Background information
- Born: Jason Jeremy Freese; January 12, 1975 (age 51)
- Origin: Orange County, California, U.S.
- Genres: Alternative rock; punk rock; pop punk; garage rock
- Occupation: Musician
- Instruments: Keyboards; saxophone; flute; trombone; vocals; guitar
- Years active: 1992–present
- Father: Stan Freese
- Relatives: Josh Freese (brother)
- Member of: Foxboro Hot Tubs
- Website: jasonfreese.com

Jason Jeremy Freese (born January 12, 1975) is an American musician and multi-instrumentalist. Since 2004, he has been the touring keyboard and saxophone player for the punk rock band Green Day. Freese has performed on over 50 albums, mainly on saxophones and keyboards, for artists such as Green Day, Dr. Dre, Pitbull, Weezer, Avenged Sevenfold, Goo Goo Dolls, and Jewel.

== Early life ==
Freese was born on January 12, 1975, in Orange County, California. His father, Stan Freese, was leader of the Disneyland Band in Disneyland Park at the time of his birth, and went on to become a talent booker for the park. His mother, Trisha Freese (later Bridenstine), is a concert pianist and writer. Freese's older brother is drummer Josh Freese.

Beginning at the age of five and seven, Freese and his brother spent their summers at Disneyland while their father worked. They both watched him perform concerts with the Disneyland Band and sometimes participated with plastic instruments. Both boys eventually got jobs shining shoes for the park employees.

== Career ==
Freese attended Brookhaven Elementary School, Tuffree Middle School and El Dorado High School. Then enrolled at California State University, Fullerton. At age 23, he was a year and a half away from graduation when an opportunity came up to go on tour with Joe Walsh of the Eagles.

After the Joe Walsh tour, Freese joined the Goo Goo Dolls. At the time, the Goo Goo Dolls had the same manager as Green Day. Freese has performed as a studio musician and touring member in Green Day since 2004. He has performed on their American Idiot World Tour, 21st Century Breakdown World Tour, 99 Revolutions Tour, Revolution Radio Tour, Hella Mega Tour, and Saviors World Tour, and appeared on their live albums Bullet in a Bible and Awesome as Fuck. His performing credits most often consist of saxophone, piano, and keyboards. His credits as a producer include Jewel's 2009 album Lullaby and Death by Stereo's 2009 album Death Is My Only Friend.

== Discography ==
Release date	Artist	Title	Credits
1996-10-08	The Vandals	Oi to the World!	saxophone
1997	Ex-Idols	Who We Are	saxophone
1998-06-23	The Vandals	Hitler Bad, Vandals Good	saxophone
1999-03-09	Joe Sherbanee	The Road Ahead	tenor saxophone
2000-07-11	Josh Freese	The Notorious One Man Orgy	piano, saxophone
2000-11-21	Dweezil Zappa	Automatic	performer
2001-09-18	Los Calzones	Plastico	keyboards
2001-11-27	Various artists	The Concert for New York City	keyboards
2002-09-27	Lazlo Bane	All the Time in the World	saxophone
2003-01-28	Engelbert Humperdinck	Definition of Love	backing vocals, saxophone, keyboards
2003-05-06	NOFX	The War on Errorism	saxophone
2003-06-27	Jeff Scott Soto	Prism	saxophone
2003-08-05	Stripsearch	Stripsearch	saxophone
2004-03-30	Rennie Pilgrem	Y4K	saxophone
2004-05-04	Kimberley Locke	One Love	horn
2004-05-11	Ellis Hall	Straight Ahead	tenor saxophone
2004-07-27	Tommy Stinson	Village Gorilla Head	saxophone
2004-09-21	Green Day	American Idiot	saxophone
2004-09-28	Afrika Bambaataa	Dark Matter Moving at the Speed of Light	saxophone
2004-09-28	Klear	Makin' Noise	keyboards, bells, Hammond organ, whistling
2004-09-28	The Juliet Dagger	Turn Up the Death	keyboards
2004-09-28	Last Conservative	On to the Next One	keyboards
2004-10-26	Fredalba	Uptown Music for Downtown Kids	keyboards
2004-11-02	A Perfect Circle	Emotive	baritone saxophone, tenor saxophone
2004-11-23	Goo Goo Dolls	Live in Buffalo: July 4, 2004	keyboards, percussion, saxophone
2005-03-15	Various artists	Drum Nation, Volume Two	saxophone
2005-05-10	Weezer	Make Believe	saxophone
2005-08-23	Aphrodite	Overdrive	saxophone
2005-11-15	Green Day	Bullet in a Bible	backing vocals, saxophone, trombone, keyboards, acoustic guitar, accordion
2006-02-25	Goo Goo Dolls	Let Love In	keyboards
2006-06-13	Busta Rhymes	The Big Bang	saxophone
2006-07-11	Zebrahead	Broadcast to the World	musician, composer, instrumentation
2006-09-19	Faulter	Darling Buds of May	organ
2006-10-31	Viva Death	One Percent Panic	baritone saxophone
2006-11-21	Rock Star Supernova	Rock Star Supernova	musician
2007-06-26	Forty Marshas	Forty Marshas	saxophone, piano, keyboards
2007-07-10	Spoon	Ga Ga Ga Ga Ga	saxophone
2007-09-10	One Small Step for Landmines	One Small Step for Landmines	Hammond organ
2008-01-22	The Whigs	Mission Control	baritone saxophone, tenor saxophone
2008-04-08	P.O.D.	When Angels & Serpents Dance	keyboards
2008-04-22	Foxboro Hot Tubs	Stop Drop and Roll!!!	keyboard, saxophone, flute, backing vocals
2008-06-03	Jewel	Perfectly Clear	mellotron, Hammond organ, Wurlitzer organ, strings
2008-06-23	Fandangle	Fly Away	keyboards
2008-08-05	Zebrahead	Phoenix	backing vocals, musician, demo coordinator
2008-08-05	Jimmy Kane	A Constant State of Motion	piano
2009-04-14	Josh Freese	Since 1972	saxophone
2009-04-28	NOFX	Coaster	keyboards
2009-05-05	Jewel	Lullaby	producer, mellotron, triangle, accordion, piano
2009-05-15	Green Day	21st Century Breakdown	piano
2009-06-02	Candy Now!	Candy Now!	clarinet
2009-07-07	Death by Stereo	Death Is My Only Friend	producer, backing vocals, instrumentation, recording engineer, composer
2009-07-07	Yves Klein Blue	Ragged & Ecstatic	tenor saxophone
2010-06-08	Jewel	Sweet and Wild	mellotron, glockenspiel
2011-03-22	Green Day	Awesome as Fuck	keyboards, horns, backing vocals
2011-07-27	Zebrahead	Get Nice!	producer, instrumentation, pre-production, backing vocals, recording engineer
2012-06-01	Vicci Martinez	Vicci	keyboards
2012-06-19	LIT	The View from the Bottom	Hammond B3, piano, strings
2013-04-09	Face To Face	Three Chords and a Half Truth	Hammond B3, tenor sax
2014-09-29	Gerard Way	Hesitant Alien	baritone saxophone
2014-11-21	Pitbull	Globalization	saxophone
2015-07-17	Sublime With Rome	Sirens	drums, percussion
2015-08-07	Dr. Dre	Compton	saxophone
2016-10-28	Avenged Sevenfold	The Stage	keyboards
2017-11-17	Green Day	God's Favorite Band	piano
2018-06-29	The Interrupters	Fight the Good Fight	saxophone
2022-08-05	The Interrupters	In the Wild	saxophone
2023-06-02	Avenged Sevenfold	Life Is But a Dream...	synthesizer
