= Justin Mauriello =

American singer & guitarist (born 1975)

- Justin Mauriello performing during a sound check in 2008

Background information
- Also known as: Goldtoof (early years in Zebrahead)
- Origin: La Habra, California, U.S.
- Genres: Alternative rock; punk rock; pop punk; skate punk; electronic rock; alternative metal
- Occupations: Musician; singer; songwriter
- Instruments: Vocals; guitar
- Years active: 1996–present
- Labels: Glassnote; In-n-Out

Justin Mauriello (born 1975) is the lead singer and guitarist for the alternative rock band Darling Thieves, and former guitarist and founding member of punk rock band Zebrahead.

== Musical career ==
=== Zebrahead (1996–2004) ===
Mauriello was a founding member of the band Zebrahead, with lead guitarist Greg Bergdorf and drummer Ed Udhus (both formerly of the band 409), and bassist Ben Osmundson (formerly of the band 3-Ply); they began collaboration through sharing the same rehearsal space, forming Zebrahead to incorporate musical elements of ska-punk and hip-hop, while recruiting rapper Ali Tabatabaee. Mauriello left Zebrahead shortly after their 2004 Japanese Tour.

=== I Hate Kate/Darling Thieves (2004–present) ===
Mauriello had founded the band Darling Thieves, (then I Hate Kate), while still in Zebrahead, and it became his main focus; Darling Thieves released their first album Embrace the Curse in 2007 (As "I hate Kate", the band was later renamed after Justin's ex-girlfriend threatened a lawsuit), with music videos for the singles from the album: It's Always Better and Bed of Black Roses. A second album, Race to Red, was released in 2010, with music videos released for tracks "Unspoken" and "Free Without You". In 2012, the band's 2nd EP, "The Extended Play", was released. Darling Thieves has been on hiatus since then, while Justin focuses on his new solo EP.

=== Solo career & Olympic Crush (2010–present) ===
Mauriello released a covers album, titled Justin Sings the Hits. In 2012 Justin moved to Nashville, Tennessee. As of 2023, he is living in Dallas, Texas. Mauriello's solo EP, titled How's Life In California, was released via streaming on Spotify on January 13, 2015. In 2017, Mauriello announced his newest musical project, Olympic Crush. He has released three songs, "Stars", "Mr.Eager" and "Here In This Crazy", which are on Spotify. In October of 2019, he formed a new project called Z3N Mafia and released the track "InstaFamous" with former Zebrahead member Greg Bergdorf. In April of 2020, Mauriello reunited with members of Darling Thieves and released two new songs, "Are We Too Old To Feel This Young" and "Electric Avenue", a cover of the Eddy Grant track.

== Discography ==
Solo

- Justin Sings the Hits (2010)
- How's Life In California EP (2015)

Darling Thieves

- Act One EP (2006)
- Embrace the Curse (2007)
- Race to Red (2010)
- The Extended Play EP (2012)

Zebrahead

- Zebrahead (1998)
- Waste of Mind (1998)
- Playmate of the Year (2000)
- Stupid Fat Americans EP (2001)
- MFZB (2003)
- Waste of MFZB (2004)
