= Ali Tabatabaee =

Iranian-American musician (born 1973)

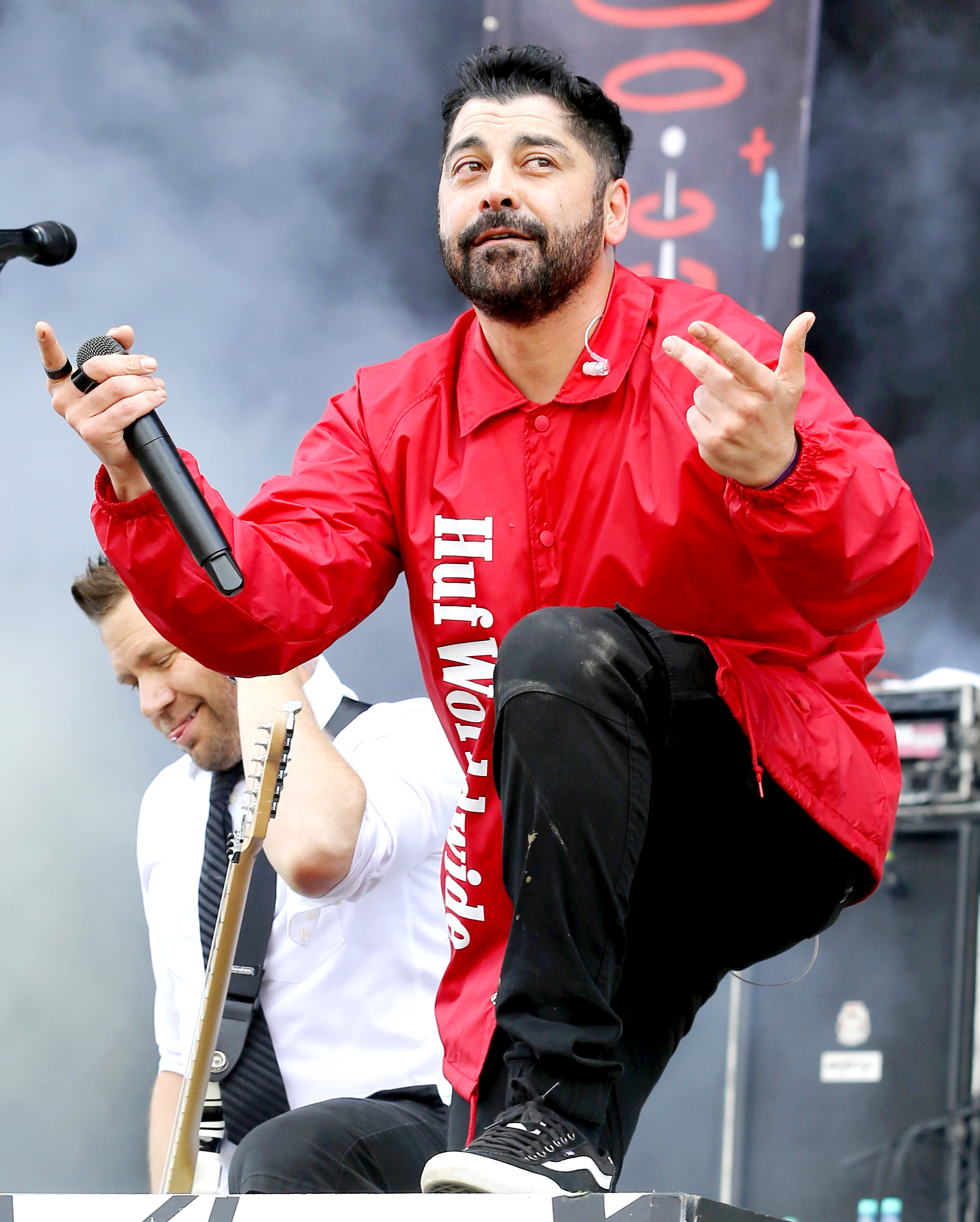
- Tabatabaee performing with Zebrahead in 2019

Background information
- Born: February 27, 1973 (age 53); Tehran, Iran
- Genres: Punk rock; pop punk; rapcore; rap rock; alternative metal; nu metal; funk rock
- Occupations: Singer; rapper; songwriter
- Years active: 1996–present
- Member of: Zebrahead

Ali Tabatabaee (Persian: علی طباطبایی ‌پور; born February 27, 1973) is an Iranian-American musician who is one of two main vocalists in the rock band Zebrahead. Alongside bandmate Matty Lewis, he performed the titular character's theme song for the 2006 video game Sonic the Hedgehog.

== Biography ==
Tabatabaee was born in Tehran, Iran on February 27, 1973. Before joining Zebrahead, Tabatabaee was a pre-med student at UC Irvine majoring in Biology and minoring in Theater. After graduating, he decided to take a year off from school to take the MCAT and to apply to medical school. It was during this time that he started singing with the other members of Zebrahead. After a year away from school he was accepted into the University of Chicago Medical School. However, due to Zebrahead's early success, he deferred acceptance for one year. "I didn't expect music to go anywhere. I thought I'd do it for a year and then I'd leave, and in a week's period, I got an acceptance to med school and we were supposed to do a showcase and the label was going to fly us to New York and I had to tell the school; they wanted to know. So I deferred for a year and then decided that I didn't want to go back after a year.... I think [music is] the ultimate way to express culture. To do that for a living? Everybody should aspire to do that." Tabatabaee cites some of his favorite bands as A Tribe Called Quest, System of a Down, and N.W.A.

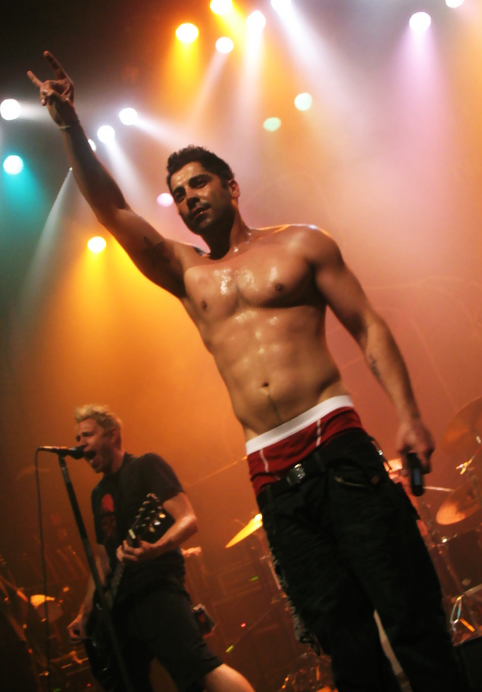
Tabatabaee performing in 2011

In 1999, while on the Warped Tour, Tabatabaee was diagnosed with Hodgkin's Disease, a type of cancer, which he underwent chemo therapy and radiation therapy to cure. While being treated, he continued to work with his bandmates in writing songs for their album, Playmate of the Year, and a few months before the album's release, he completed his therapy. He claims that because of what he was going through, some of the songs from that album are very special to him.

Tabatabaee is featured on the Reel Big Fish DVD You're All in This Together on the song "Unity" (originally by Operation Ivy).

Due to Zebrahead's growing popularity in Japan, Tabatabaee and Zebrahead bandmate Matty Lewis were asked by Sega to record vocals for a new theme song, titled "His World", which appears in the 2006 game Sonic The Hedgehog. Tabatabaee also composes most of the songs that Zebrahead performs.
