= Steve Evetts =

American record producer

- Genres: Heavy metal, punk rock
- Occupations: Producer, audio engineer, mixing
- Instruments: Guitar, bass guitar
- Years active: 1992–present
- Formerly of: Frank Iero and the Patience
- Website: steveevetts.com

Steve Evetts is an American record producer who has produced music for Alesana, Poison the Well, A Static Lullaby, The Dillinger Escape Plan, Sepultura, Symphony X, Saves the Day, Lifetime, Kid Dynamite, Hightower, Story of the Year, Every Time I Die, Earth Crisis, Still Remains, Our Last Night, and The Wonder Years. Steve Evetts has been an active producer since 1992, producing mostly metal albums, as well as indie and emo bands.

Evetts has also engaged in music-production education. He taught an online CreativeLive class in collaboration with Ben Weinman of The Dillinger Escape Plan.

Evetts has also appeared as a guest instructor on the Nail the Mix platform, where he provided a detailed mix walkthrough for a song by The Dillinger Escape Plan.

Evetts' recording studio was completely destroyed in May 2026 as the result of a structure fire that occurred at its location. He posted video of the incident to social media, where he explained that the floor collapsed, plunging "the entire contents of [his] studio into the burning pit below." A GoFundMe was established, receiving donations from members of the Wonder Years and Bad Religion.

== Discography ==
Year	Artist	Album	Label	Role	Notes					
Year	Artist	Album	Label	Role	Notes	1992	Incantation	Onward to Golgotha	Relapse Records	producer, engineer
1992	M.O.D.	Rhythm of Fear	Megaforce Records	producer, engineer, mixing						
1994	Demolition Hammer	Time Bomb	Century Media	producer, engineer, mixing						
1994	Deadguy	Work Ethic EP	Blackout Records	producer						
1995	Symphony X	The Damnation Game	Zero Corporation	producer						
1995	Deadguy	Fixation on a Co-Worker	Victory Records	producer	Inducted into Decibel's Hall of Fame in July 2006					
1995	Lifetime	Hello Bastards	Jade Tree Records	producer, engineer, mixing						
1995	M.O.D.	Loved by Thousands, Hated by Millions	Megaforce Records	vocals, producer						
1995	Shades Apart	Save It	Revelation Records/ Universal Records	producer						
1996	Lifetime	The Boy's No Good 7-inch	Jade Tree Records	mixing						
1996	Human Remains	Using Sickness as a Hero	Relapse Records	producer, engineer, mixing						
1997	Ensign	Direction of Things to Come	Indecision Records	co-producer, engineer						
1997	Symphony X	The Divine Wings of Tragedy	Zero Corporation	co-producer, engineer, mixing, mastering						
1997	Lifetime	Jersey's Best Dancers	Jade Tree Records	producer, engineer, mixing						
1997	Snapcase	Progression Through Unlearning	Victory Records	producer						
1997	Hatebreed	Satisfaction Is the Death of Desire	Victory Records	producer, engineer						
1997	The Dillinger Escape Plan	The Dillinger Escape Plan	Now or Never Records	producer, engineer						
1997	various artists	Select tracks on Violent World: A Tribute to the Misfits	Caroline Records	producer, engineer						
1998	Saves the Day	Can't Slow Down	Equal Vision Records	producer						
1998	All Out War	For Those Who Were Crucified	Victory Records	producer, engineer						
1998	Kid Dynamite	Kid Dynamite	Jade Tree Records	producer, engineer						
1998	Symphony X	Twilight in Olympus	Zero Corporation	producer (co-produced with Eric Rachael and Michael Romeo)						
1998	The Dillinger Escape Plan	Under the Running Board EP	Relapse Records	producer, engineer						
1998	E.Town Concrete	Time 2 Shine	Resurrection A.D. / Back ta Basics	producer, engineer						
1999	God Forbid	Reject the Sickness	9 Volt Records	producer, engineer, mixing						
1999	The Dillinger Escape Plan	Calculating Infinity	Relapse Records and Hydra Head Records	producer, engineer						
1999	Spitfire	The Dead Next Door	Solid State Records	producer, engineer						
1999	Buried Alive	The Death of Your Perfect World	Victory Records	producer, engineer						
1999	various artists	The Emo Diaries: Chapter 3-The Moment of Truth	Deep Elm Records	engineer						
1999	Saves the Day	Through Being Cool	Equal Vision Records	producer						
2000	Snapcase	Designs for Automotion	Victory Records	producer						
2000	Glassjaw	Everything You Ever Wanted to Know About Silence	Roadrunner Records	mixing						
2000	Earth Crisis	Slither	Victory Records	percussion, producer, engineer, mixing						
2000	Sick of It All	Yours Truly	Fat Wreck Chords	producer, engineer, mixing						
2001	Vanilla Ice	Bi-Polar	Liquid 8 Records	bass guitar						
2001	Misfits	Cuts from the Crypt	Roadrunner Records	engineer, remixing						
2001	Sepultura	Nation	Roadrunner Records	producer, engineer, mixing						
2001	The Dillinger Escape Plan	Irony Is a Dead Scene EP	Epitaph Records	mixing						
2001	Home Grown	Kings of Pop	Drive-Thru Records	producer, engineer, mixing	Reached No. 189 on the Billboard 200					
2002	Allister	Last Stop Suburbia	Drive-Thru Records	mixing	Reached No. 9 on the Billboard Top Heatseekers Chart					
2002	Symphony X	The Odyssey	InsideOut Music	mixing						
2002	Mad at Gravity	Resonance	BMG	producer, engineer	Peaked at No. 41 on the Billboard Top Heatseekers Chart					
2002	Skinlab	Revolting Room	Crash Music	producer						
2002	Various Victory Records Artists	Victory Style Vol.5	Victory Records	producer						
2003	A Static Lullaby	...And Don't Forget to Breathe	Ferret Records	producer						
2003	Kid Dynamite	Cheap Shots, Young Anthems	Jade Tree Records	producer, engineer, mixing						
2003	Catch 22	Dinosaur Sounds	Victory Records	producer, engineer, mixing						
2003	various artists	The Heart of Roadrunner Records	Roadrunner Records	mixing						
2003	Sepultura	Revolusongs	Universal Records/SPV GmbH/Victor Entertainment	producer, engineer, mixing						
2003	Sepultura	Roorback	SPV GmbH/Steamhammer Records	producer, engineer, mixing	Placed at No. 17 on Billboard's Independent Albums chart with first week sales at 4,000.					
2003	Sticks and Stones	The Strife and Times	Chunksaah Records	producer						
2003	various artists	Underworld Original Soundtrack	Lakeshore Records	producer						
2004	The Cure	Alt.end	Geffen Records	producer, engineer, mixing						
2004	The Cure	The Cure	Geffen Records	engineer, mixing	Debuted at No. 7 in the U.S. selling 91,000 in its first week and No. 8 in the U.K. 2 million copies worldwide sold.					
2004	Senses Fail	Let It Enfold You	Vagrant Records and Drive-Thru Records	producer, engineer, mixing	Has sold over 300,000 copies					
2004	The Dillinger Escape Plan	Miss Machine	Relapse Records	producer, engineer, mixing	Reached No. 106 on the Billboard 200, No. 2 on the Billboard Top Heatseekers Chart, and No. 4 on Billboard's Independent Albums chart					
2004	various artists	MTV2 Headbangers Ball, Vol. 2	Roadrunner Records	producer, mixing						
2004	Skinlab	Nerve Damage	Crash Music	producer, drum engineer						
2004	Sick of It All	Outtakes for the Outcast	Fat Wreck Chords	producer, engineer						
2005	Story of the Year	In the Wake of Determination	Maverick	producer, engineer, mixing	Reached No. 19 in U.S.					
2006	Catch 22	Permanent Revolution	Victory Records	chimes, producer, engineer, mixing						
2006	Lifetime	Somewhere in the Swamps of Jersey	Jade Tree Records	producer, engineer, mixing						
2006	Saves the Day	Sound the Alarm	Vagrant Records	producer, engineer	Reached No. 67 on Billboard 200					
2006	A Static Lullaby	A Static Lullaby	Fearless Records	producer, engineer, mixing	Reached No. 173 on Billboard 200, No. 2 on Top Heatseekers, and No. 16 on Independent Albums					
2006	He Is Legend	Suck Out the Poison	Solid State Records	producer, mixing	No. 158 on Billboard 200					
2007	The Used	Berth	Reprise Records	engineer, mixing	Certified Gold					
2007	Every Time I Die	The Big Dirty	Epitaph Records	producer, engineer, mixing	No. 41 on Billboard 200					
2007	The Dillinger Escape Plan	Ire Works	Relapse Records	producer, engineer, mixing	No. 142 on Billboard 200					
2007	Lifetime	Lifetime	DCD2 Records	producer, engineer, mixing						
2007	Still Remains	The Serpent	Roadrunner Records	producer, engineer,						
2007	God Forbid	Sickness and Misery	E1 Music	producer, engineer, mixing						
2008	Our Last Night	The Ghosts Among Us	Epitaph Records	producer, engineer, mixing	Peaked at No. 6 on Top Heatseekers					
2008	Demolition Hammer	Necrology	Century Media	producer, engineer, mixing						
2008	A Static Lullaby	Rattlesnake!	Fearless Records	producer, engineer, mixing	Reached No. 16 on Top Heatseekers and No. 50 on Independent Albums					
2008	Alesana	Where Myth Fades to Legend	Fearless Records	producer, engineer, mixing	Reached No. 96 on Billboard 200					
2009	Vanna	A New Hope	Epitaph Records	percussion, piano, producer	Reached No. 31 on Top Heatseekers chart					
2009	The Number Twelve Looks Like You	Worse Than Alone	Eyeball Records	mixing	Peaked at No. 47 Top Heatseekers chart					
2009	Poison the Well	The Tropic Rot	Ferret Music	producer, engineer, mixing	Reached No. 180 on Billboard 200					
2009	Every Time I Die	New Junk Aesthetic	Epitaph	producer, engineer, mixing						
2009	Later Days	Don't Forget The Name	unsigned	producer, engineer, mixing						
2009	To Kill the King	I Am Not the Answer	unsigned	mixing						
2010	The Dillinger Escape Plan	Option Paralysis	Party Smasher Inc/Seasons of Mist	producer, engineer, mixing						
2010	Devil Sold His Soul	Blessed & Cursed	Century Media	mixing						
2011	Torch	Pt.IV: a New Beginning	MBN Music Business Norway	mixing						
2011	Architects	The Here And Now	Century Media	producer, engineer, mixing						
2011	The Wonder Years	Suburbia I've Given You All and Now I'm Nothing	Hopeless Records	producer, engineer, mixing						
2011	Suicide Silence	The Black Crown	Century Media Records	producer, engineer						
2011	Warbringer	Worlds Torn Asunder	Century Media Records	producer						
2011	Berri Txarrak	Haria	Kaiowas Records	engineer						
2012	Prong	Carved into Stone	Long Branch Records/SPV	producer, engineer, mixing	Reached No. 13 on the Top Heatseekers chart					
2013	The Dillinger Escape Plan	One of Us Is the Killer	Party Smasher Inc./Sumerian Records	producer, engineer, mixing	No. 25 on the Billboard 200					
2013	The Wonder Years	The Greatest Generation	Hopeless Records	producer, engineer, mixing	No. 20 on the Billboard 200					
2013	Eyes Set to Kill	Masks	Century Media Records	producer, engineer, mixing, writer						
2013	Sepultura	The Mediator Between Head and Hands Must Be the Heart	Nuclear Blast	mixing						
2013	Warbringer	IV: Empires Collapse	Century Media	producer, engineer						
2014	Prong	Ruining Lives	Steamhammer/SPV	producer, engineer, mixing						
2014	Suicide Silence	You Can't Stop Me	Nuclear Blast	producer, mixing, engineer						
2014	Project 86	Knives To the Future	Independent	mixing						
2014	Hightower	Sure. Fine. Whatever.	Knives Out Records	producer						
2015	The Wonder Years	No Closer to Heaven	Hopeless Records	producer, engineer	No. 12 on the Billboard 200					
2016	Incite	Oppression	Minus Head Records	producer, mixing						
2016	Real Friends	The Home Inside My Head	Fearless Records	producer						
2016	The Dillinger Escape Plan	Dissociation	Party Smasher Inc./Cooking Vinyl	producer	No. 31 on the Billboard 200					
2016	Frank Iero and the Patience	Parachutes	BMG Rights Management, Vagrant	bassist						
2016	Hightower	Club Dragon	Krod Records	producer						
2017	Havok	Conformicide	Century Media Records	producer, mixing						
2017	Butcher Babies	Lilith	Century Media Records	producer, mixing						
2018	DevilDriver	Outlaws 'til The End: Vol. 1	Napalm Records	producer, mixing						
2019	Incite	Built to Destroy	Minus Head Records	producer						
2020	Suicide Silence	Become the Hunter	Nuclear Blast	producer						
2020	New Found Glory	Forever + Ever x Infinity	Hopeless Records	producer, engineer						
2020	DevilDriver	Dealing with Demons I	Napalm Records	producer, engineer, mixing						
2022	The Wonder Years	The Hum Goes On Forever	Hopeless Records	producer						
2025	happier?	Anything	Independent	mixing						
