= Eyes Set to Kill discography =

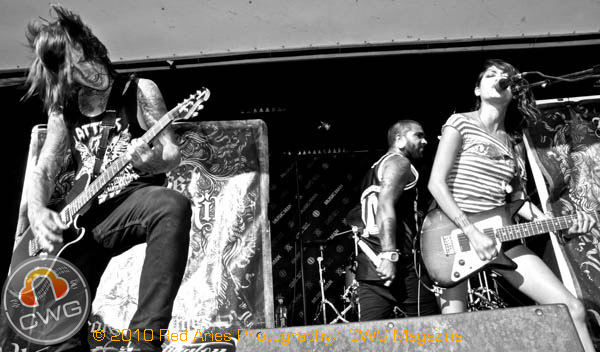
- Studio albums: 6
- Extended plays: 2
- Singles: 20
- Music videos: 15

The discography of Eyes Set to Kill, an American rock band, includes six studio albums, two extended plays, one demo, twenty singles, and fifteen music videos.

== Studio albums ==
List of studio albums, with selected details, chart positions and sales
Year	Album details	Peak chart positions			Sales
Year	Album details	US Heat	US Indie	US Hard Rock	Sales
2008	Reach: Release date: February 19, 2008; Label: Break Silence; Format: CD, digital download, vinyl LP	29	—	—	
2009	The World Outside: Release date: June 2, 2009; Label: Break Silence; Format: CD, digital download	9	26	—	US: 7,500
2010	Broken Frames: Release date: June 8, 2010; Label: Break Silence; Format: CD, digital download	9	34	21	US: 10,000
2011	White Lotus: Release date: August 8, 2011; Label: Forsee Records/Maphia Entertainment; Format: CD, digital download	—	—	—	US: 2,000
2013	Masks: Release date: September 17, 2013; Label: Century Media Records; Format: CD, digital download	5	34	11	US: 2,600
2018	Eyes Set to Kill: Release date: February 16, 2018; Label: Century Media Records; Format: CD, digital download	22	—	—	
"—" denotes releases that did not chart

== Extended plays ==
List of EPs, with selected details
Year	Details
2006	When Silence Is Broken, The Night Is Torn: Released: July 6, 2006; Label: Self-released
2021	Damna: Released: December 3, 2021; Label: Revival Recordings

=== DVDs ===
Year	Album details
2007	A Day with Eyes Set to Kill: Released: 2007; Label: Break Silence; Format: DVD

=== Demos ===
Year	Song
2005	"Flight on Broken Wings"
2005	"Cover Me Up"
2005	"Our Hearts"
2005	"Keep Oxygen (Into the Night)"

== Singles ==
Year	Song	Album
2008	"Reach"	Reach
2008	"Darling"	Reach
2009	"Heights"	The World Outside
2009	"The World Outside"	The World Outside
2009	"Deadly Weapons" (featuring Craig Mabbitt)	The World Outside
2010	"All You Ever Knew"	Broken Frames
2010	"Broken Frames"	Broken Frames
2011	"The Secrets Between"	White Lotus
2013	"Lost and Forgotten"	Masks
2013	"Infected"	Masks
2018	"Break"	Eyes Set to Kill
2018	"Not Sorry"	Eyes Set to Kill
2018	"Attention"	Non-album single
2019	"Points of Authority" (featuring Whitney Peyton)	Non-album single
2020	"Enjoy the Silence" (with One Eyed Doll)	Non-album single
2020	"House of Glass"	Non-album single
2021	"Find Our Way"	Non-album single
2021	"Face the Rain" (featuring Howard Jones)	Damna
2021	"Sink Your Teeth" (featuring Heidi Shepherd)	Damna
2024	"Wilderness"	Non-album single

== Music videos ==
Year	Song	Director
2006	"Liar in the Glass"	Zachary Yoshloka
2006	"Beauty Through Broken Glass"	Zachary Yoshloka
2006	"This Love You Breathe"	Brittany Bush
2006	"Darling"	Brittany Bush
2008	"Reach"	MOTIONarmy
2008	"Darling"	MOTIONarmy
2009	"Heights"	Chad Archibald, Philip Carrer
2009	"The World Outside"	Chad Archibald, Philip Carrer
2010	"Deadly Weapons"	Chad Archibald, Philip Carrer, Dave Aguilera
2010	"Broken Frames"	MOTIONarmy
2013	"Infected"	Daniel Andres Gomez Bagby
2017	"Break"	Jesse Conti
2019	"Attention"	Chucky Guzman
2021	"Face the Rain"	Jim Louvau & Tony Aguilera
2025	"Wilderness"	Alexia Rodriguez

== Featured singles ==
Title	Year	Artist	Album	Link
"Alaska, You're On Thin Ice Buddy!" (featuring Alexia Rodriguez)	2025	Ashtray for Aliens	Symptoms of Sanity	
"The Heart Wants What It Wants" (featuring Alexia Rodriguez)	2024	Thousand Frames	Signs and Wonders	
"The Bitter Truth, Part 1" (featuring Alexia Rodriguez)	2024	Pathwechoose	Single	
"Home" (featuring Alexia Rodriguez)	2022	Chaosbay	2222	
"Where the Heart Belongs" (featuring Alexia Rodriguez)	2021	Softspoken	Where the Heart Belongs	
"Sorry that I'm not Sorry" (featuring Alexia Rodriguez)	2017	Whitney Peyton	Firecraker: Pyro	
"Better" (featuring Alexia Rodriguez)	2017	Whitney Peyton	Firecraker: Pyro	
"Manere Aurum" (featuring Alexia Rodriguez)	2015	Elle Kaye	Comas Collide	
"Long Way Down" (featuring Alexia Rodriguez)	2014	Gus G	I Am the Fire	
"Cross-Eyed Catastrophe" (featuring Alexia Rodriguez)	2012	Suicide Silence	The Black Crown	
