= Kid Dynamite =

Kid Dynamite may refer to:

- Mike Tyson (born 1966), boxer nicknamed Kid Dynamite
- Lodewijk Parisius (1911-1963), Surinamese/Dutch jazz musician known as Kid Dynamite
- Kid Dynamite (film), a 1943 film directed by Wallace Fox and starring The East Side Kids
- Kid Dynamite (band) a Philadelphia-based hardcore punk band
  - Kid Dynamite (album), a 1998 eponymous album
- "Kid Dynamite" (song), the first single and lead track on Squirrel Bait's 1987 album Skag Heaven
- Nickname of J. J. Evans, a character played by Jimmie Walker on the American television show Good Times
- Nickname of Gene Cordell, a character in The Street with No Name (1948)

== See also ==
- Dynamite Kid
