= Lifetime discography =

New Jersey, United States

- Studio albums: 4
- Extended plays: 4
- Compilation albums: 2
- Music videos: 1

The discography of Lifetime, a punk rock band from New Jersey, consists of four studio albums, four extended plays, two compilation albums and a handful of tracks released on various other compilations.

== Studio albums ==
Year	Information
1993	Background: Released: January 1, 1993; Labels: New Age Records; Formats: CD, 12" vinyl; Released in Europe as Ghost with different artwork and track listing.
1995	Hello Bastards: Released: September 25, 1995; Label: Jade Tree Records; Formats: CD, 12" vinyl; Re-released by No Idea Records on 12" color vinyl on February 20, 2010.
1997	Jersey's Best Dancers: Released: June 10, 1997; Label: Jade Tree Records; Formats: CD, 12" vinyl
2007	Lifetime: Released: February 6, 2007; Label: Decaydance; Formats: CD, 12" vinyl

== Extended plays ==
Year	Information
1991	Lifetime: Released: 1991; Labels: New Age Records; Formats: 7" vinyl
1994	Tinnitus: Released: 1994; Label: Glue Records; Formats: 7" vinyl
1996	The Boy's No Good: Released: 1996; Label: Jade Tree Records; Formats: 7" vinyl; Note: also called "An Outstanding Recording Achievement"
2006	Two Songs: Released: 2006; Label: Decaydance; Formats: 7" vinyl

== Compilations ==
Year	Information
1994	Seveninches: Released: 1994; Labels: Glue Records; Formats: CD, 12" vinyl; This is a collection of the Lifetime and Tinnitus EPs along with other compilation tracks. It was re-released in 1998 by Black Cat Records.
2006	Somewhere in the Swamps of Jersey: Released: March 21, 2006; Labels: Jade Tree Records; Formats: CD

== Music videos ==
Year	Song
2007	"Airport Monday Morning"

== Other appearances ==
- Horizon Records Hardcore Compilation (Horizon Records, 1991)
  - Lifetime contribute a live version of "Alive".
- It's For Life (Consequence Records, 1992 / Victory Records, 1995)
  - Lifetime contributes "Up" from the Background LP.
- Eternity - An East Coast Hardcore Compilation (Outback Records, 1994)
  - Lifetime contributes "Secede" which was later featured on the Seven Inches collection.
- Music Does A Body Good (Glue Records, 1994)
  - Lifetime contributes "New England" (originally recorded by Billy Bragg) which was later collected on the Seven Inches collection.
- Land of Greed... World Of Need (Watermark / Trustkill Records, 1994)
  - Lifetime contributes "Money" (originally recorded by Embrace) which was later collected on the Seven Inches collection.
- Anti-Matter (Another Planet Records, 1996)
  - Lifetime contributes an alternate version of "Theme Song for a New Brunswick Basement Show" which was later remixed for the Somewhere in the Swamps of Jersey collection.
- The Tie That Binds (Nevermore Records, 1996)
  - Lifetime contributes and alternate version of "Bringing It Backwards" which was later remixed for the Somewhere in the Swamps of Jersey collection.
- Punk Uprisings Vol. 2 (Go-Kart Records, 1997)
  - Lifetime contributes an alternate version of "Young, Loud, and Scotty" which was later remixed for the Somewhere in the Swamps of Jersey collection.
