= A Static Lullaby (album) =

Studio album by A Static Lullaby
- Released: October 10, 2006
- Recorded: 2006
- Genre: Post-hardcore; metalcore; emo
- Length: 43:09
- Label: Fearless
- Producer: Steve Evetts

A Static Lullaby chronology
| Faso Latido (2005) | A Static Lullaby (2006) | Rattlesnake! (2008) |

Singles from A Static Lullaby
- 1. "Hang 'Em High" Released: November 28, 2006; 2. "The Art of Sharing Lovers" Released: January 30, 2008; 3. "Let Go" Released: 2009

Professional ratings
Review scores
| Source | Rating |
|---|---|
| AbsolutePunk.net | 79% |
| Allmusic | 3.5/5 stars |
| Lambgoat | 6/10 |
| Melodic | 3/5 stars |

A Static Lullaby is the third album by post-hardcore band A Static Lullaby released October 10, 2006 through Fearless Records. This is the first release after the departure of three members of the band's original lineup and is also the only album to feature drummer Jarrod Alexander and guitarist/vocalist John Martinez.

The album was produced by Steve Evetts, who also produced the band's debut ...And Don't Forget to Breathe.

== Background ==
Following the release of Faso Latido, the band was dropped from their record label, Columbia Records. During this time, guitarist Nate Lindeman and bassist Phil Pirrone left to form Casket Salesmen. Shortly after this, drummer Brett Dinovo left the band. John Martinez, Dane Poppin and Jarrod Alexander were hired on guitar, bass and drums, respectively. After the mixed reaction to the more mainstream alternative rock sound of Faso Latido, A Static Lullaby returned to the aggressive post-hardcore sound heard on their debut, ...And Don't Forget to Breathe, while also showing strong signs of a metalcore sound. A Static Lullaby is the band's first release on Fearless Records.

== Reception ==
Upon its release, A Static Lullaby received generally positive reviews.

Absolute Punk reviewer Dre Berringer praised the band's return to a more aggressive sound and called it their best album to date. He noted the album is nothing new, but A Static Lullaby "does a fine job at making it enjoyable to listen to, rather than sounding like all of the other dime a dozen imposters." AllMusic reviewer Greg Prato noted the band's use of formula, comparing them to AFI, The Used and My Chemical Romance. Prato noted the band's line-up change, saying "the lineup hiccup has not thrown the group off their musical path in the slightest." Melodic reviewer Kaj Roth said the songs were stronger than those on Faso Latido and praised the closing track, "Mechanical Heart", calling it the band's best song so far.

== Track listing ==
All lyrics written by Joe Brown and Dan Arnold, all music composed by A Static Lullaby

| No. | Title | Length |
|---|---|---|
| 1. | "Hang 'Em High!" | 4:02 |
| 2. | "Contagious" | 4:09 |
| 3. | "Annexation of Puerto Rico" | 3:46 |
| 4. | "The Art of Sharing Lovers" | 3:35 |
| 5. | "The Collision" | 4:01 |
| 6. | "Trigger Happy Tarantulas" | 4:07 |
| 7. | "Eager Cannibals" | 2:55 |
| 8. | "Life in a Museum" | 4:00 |
| 9. | "Stare at the Air" | 2:57 |
| 10. | "Static Slumber Party" | 3:47 |
| 11. | "Mechanical Heart" | 5:50 |
| Total length: | | 43:09 |

Digital edition and Japanese bonus track
| No. | Title | Writer(s) | Length |
|---|---|---|---|
| 12. | "Let Go" (Frou Frou cover) | Imogen Heap, Guy Sigsworth | 3:18 |

== Credits ==
A Static Lullaby

- Joe Brown – unclean vocals
- Dan Arnold – clean vocals, piano, programming, keyboards, rhythm guitar
- John Martinez – lead guitar, backing vocals
- Dane Poppin – bass, backing vocals
- Jarrod Alexander – drums, percussion

Additional

- Steve Evetts – producer, engineer, mixing
- Alan Douches – mastering
- Allan Hessler – editing, engineer
- Kyle Crawford – art direction, design
- Jeremy Fisher – illustrations
