= Rattlesnake! =

Studio album by A Static Lullaby
- Released: September 9, 2008
- Recorded: April – June 2008
- Studio: Omen Room Studios in Garden Grove, California
- Genres: Post-hardcore; Southern rock
- Length: 34:53
- Label: Fearless
- Producer: Steve Evetts

A Static Lullaby chronology
A Static Lullaby (2006)	Rattlesnake! (2008)

Singles from Rattlesnake!
- 1. "Toxic" Released: March 5, 2009; 2. "Under Water Knife Fight" Released: March 23, 2009

Professional ratings
Review scores
Source	Rating
Absolute Punk	(80%)
AllMusic	Highly Positive

Rattlesnake! is the fourth and final studio album by post-hardcore band A Static Lullaby. The album was released through Fearless Records on September 9, 2008. The album was produced by Steve Evetts who also produced all previous albums by A Static Lullaby except for Faso Latido which was produced by Lou Giordano (Taking Back Sunday, The Color Fred). It is their first release to carry the Parental Advisory sticker. This is the last album released by the band before their break-up in January 2012.

== Background ==
This is the first album to be released by the group as a four-piece band. The former second guitarist, John Martinez, left A Static Lullaby on good terms and was not replaced. This is also the first album with new drummer, Tyler Mahurin. The band has been playing three songs off the record on their Party Star tour: "Rattlesnake!", "The Pledge", and "The Prestige".

The song "The Pledge" features guest vocals by Greg Puciato (Dillinger Escape Plan).

=== Rattlesnake band ===
During a live interview on the website Stickam (a website for those with webcams) before the release of the album their current bassist Dane Poppin (who recorded on the album) was said to be replaced by a name from a fictitious band called Rattlesnake. The band said that the album was named after the band and that the bassist from Rattlesnake (who appeared in the interview) was to fill in for a while. Halfway through the interview the band revealed that they had pranked all those watching. Dane was wearing a fake mustache, playing the part of the fake Rattlesnake bassist and the band also admitted that they made up Rattlesnake. The band also admitted that it would be funny if they learned of Britney Spears having heard their cover of Toxic.

== Track listing ==
All lyrics written by Joe Brown and Dan Arnold, all music composed by A Static Lullaby

No.	Title	Length
1.	"Rattlesnake!"	3:34
2.	"Bear Trap"	3:50
3.	"The Turn"	3:23
4.	"The Scavenger"	4:47
5.	"The Prestige"	4:06
6.	"Aller au Diable"	4:10
7.	"Mourning Would Come"	3:28
8.	"The Pledge" (feat. Greg Puciato)	3:20
9.	"Under Water Knife Fight"	3:14
10.	"Everybody's Got a Little Fonz in 'Em!" (feat. Matt Wheeler)	4:12
Total length:		35:06

Bonus track
No.	Title	Writer(s)	Length
11.	"Toxic" (Britney Spears cover)	Cathy Dennis, Christian Karlsson, Pontus Winnberg, Henrik Jonback	3:20

== Personnel ==
=== A Static Lullaby ===
- Joe Brown - unclean vocals
- Dan Arnold - clean vocals, piano, programming, keyboards, guitar
- Dane Poppin - bass guitar, backing vocals
- Tyler Mahurin - drums, percussion

=== Additional personnel ===
- Greg Puciato - vocals on track 8
- Matt Wheeler - vocals on track 10
- Produced, engineered, and mixed by Steve Evetts
- Mastered by Alan Douches
- Art direction and design by Sons of Nero
- Bob Becker - A&R
