= Near-Death Travel Services =

Studio album by Deadguy
- Released: June 27, 2025
- Length: 36:22
- Label: Relapse
- Producer: Steve Evetts

Deadguy chronology
| Buyer's Remorse (2022) | Near-Death Travel Services (2025) |

Deadguy studio album chronology
| Fixation on a Co-Worker (1995) | Near-Death Travel Services (2025) |

Singles from Near-Death Travel Services
- 1. "Kill Fee" Released: April 29, 2025

Near-Death Travel Services is the second studio album by American metalcore band Deadguy. It was released on June 27, 2025, via Relapse in LP, cassette, CD and digital formats.

== Background ==
The album was preceded by the band's debut album, Fixation on a Co-Worker, released thirty years prior in 1995. Steve Evetts, who also produced the debut album, produced Near-Death Travel Services. It consists of eleven tracks with a total runtime of approximately thirty-six minutes, each track ranging between two and four minutes. The album title was derived from the band's name, and the album is thematically a protest against rugged individualism and greed.

The opening track, "Kill Fee", was released as the album's first single on April 29, 2025, alongside a music video directed by William Saunders.

== Reception ==
Professional ratings
Review scores
| Source | Rating |
|---|---|
| Distorted Sound | 9/10 stars |
| Kerrang! | 4/5 stars |
| Metal Hammer | 9/10 stars |

BrooklynVegan noted about Near-Death Travel Services, describing the production as "a little more crisp and modern than it was on Fixation on a Co-Worker, but not by much," and the album as consisting of "classic Deadguy hallmarks–the discordant guitars, the chaotic rhythms, the caustic shouts of Tim Singer."

Distorted Sound rated the album nine out of ten and commented, "Comebacks are rarely as vital, as exciting and as life affirming as this, especially after three decades and it has to be said that Deadguy have just set the standard once again with Near-Death Travel Services."

The album received a rating of four out of five from Kerrang!, whose reviewer Mischa Pearlman remarked, "A punishingly powerful reflection of and rebuke to the world we live in, Near-Death Travel Service proves there's plenty of vim, vigour and vitality – life, in other words – left in Deadguy." Stephen Hill of Metal Hammer rated the album nine out of ten and described it as "unquestionably this year's finest comeback," stating it "delivers."

== Track listing ==
All tracks are written by Deadguy.

Near-Death Travel Services track listing
| No. | Title | Length |
|---|---|---|
| 1. | "Kill Fee" | 2:48 |
| 2. | "Barn Burner" | 2:55 |
| 3. | "New Best Friend" | 4:11 |
| 4. | "Cheap Trick" | 2:29 |
| 5. | "The Forever People" | 4:09 |
| 6. | "War with Strangers" | 3:49 |
| 7. | "Knife Sharpener" | 2:09 |
| 8. | "The Alarmist" | 3:19 |
| 9. | "The Long Search for Perfect Timing" | 2:51 |
| 10. | "All Stick & No Carrot" | 3:25 |
| 11. | "Wax Princess" | 4:17 |
| Total length: | | 36:22 |

== Personnel ==
Credits adapted from the album's liner notes and Tidal.

=== Deadguy ===
- Chris Corvino – electric guitar
- Dave Rosenberg – drums
- Tim Singer – lead vocals, graphic design, street photography
- Keith Huckins – electric guitar
- Jim Baglino – electric bass guitar

=== Additional contributors ===
- Steve Evetts – engineering, production
- Brad Boatright – mastering
- Forgerelli – live photo
- Karen Lechelt – various illustrations
