= Falling Fast =

Falling Fast may refer to:

- "Falling Fast", a song by Eyes Set to Kill
- "Falling Fast", a song by Avril Lavigne
