= Lifetime (Lifetime album) =

Studio album by Lifetime
- Released: February 6, 2007
- Recorded: Fall 2006
- Studio: Trax East, South River, New Jersey
- Genre: Hardcore punk; melodic hardcore; emocore; pop-punk
- Length: 21:30
- Label: Decaydance, Fueled By Ramen
- Producer: Steve Evetts

Lifetime chronology
Somewhere in the Swamps of Jersey (2006)	Lifetime (2007)

Lifetime is the fourth album by American punk rock band Lifetime.

== Background ==
Lifetime broke up following the release of their studio album Jersey's Best Dancers in 1997; they reformed to play at Hellfest in August 2005, though the festival was later cancelled. Their eventual reunion shows were held in January 2006 on the US West Coast, with support from the Loved Ones, followed by an appearance at the South by Southwest music conference. On March 28, 2006, it was announced that the band had signed to Pete Wentz of Fall Out Boy's label Decaydance, which was an imprint of Fueled By Ramen. Wentz explained that he signed the group "because the world needs another Lifetime record." In July, the band went on a brief headlining tour of the U.S. – their first in nine years – with support from The Bronx.

== Release ==
In October 2006, the band appeared at The Fest. In November 2006, the band released a 7" vinyl single featuring the songs "All Night Long" and "Haircuts and T-Shirts". Both tracks were made available for streaming later in the month; re-recorded versions appeared on the upcoming album. On November 20, 2006, Lifetime was announced for release in three months' time. Eight days later, the album's track listing was posted online. In mid-December, the band held a free show in New York City, which acted as a video shoot for a music video. The album's artwork was posted online on December 21, 2006. An e-card was posted on January 9, 2007, which included "Airport Monday Morning", and the re-recordings of "All Night Long" and "Haircuts and T-Shirts". Throughout the month, they supported Fall Out Boy on select shows of their headlining US tour. On January 31, 2007, "Northbound Breakdown"was posted online via music website The Syndicate.

Lifetime was planned for release in late February 2007, before being released on February 6, 2007 through Decaydance and Fueled By Ramen. It was made available for streaming a day prior. Throughout February, the band played a number of album release shows on the West and East Coasts of the US. The music video for "Airport Monday Morning" was released on March 9, 2007. On April 6, 2007, Lifetime was released on vinyl; copies were made available at upcoming shows. In April, the band went on a tour of the US with support from the Draft. In August, the band went on a co-headlining tour of the east coast with The Bouncing Souls, and were supported by the Ergs! and Static Radio NJ. The following month, they performed at the Musicfest NW festival. They played tour two shows in Japan with First to Leave in November 2007. They closed out the year touring Australia and then appearing at the Fun Fun Fun Fest in Austin, Texas.

== Reception ==
Professional ratings
Review scores
Source	Rating
AbsolutePunk	86%
AllMusic	4/5 stars
The A.V. Club	B+
Pitchfork	7.9/10
Punknews.org	4/5 stars

The album was well received by critics and fans alike. Allmusic gave the album 4 stars, stating: "..while the guys may be older and more mature, they're still the same hardcore kids at heart". AbsolutePunk.net also gave the album praise: "Clocking in at around 24 minutes, it’s exactly what the majority of Lifetime fans should expect and love." Punknews.org ranked the album at number two on their list of the year's 20 best releases. Alternative Press ranked "Airport Monday Morning" at number 86 on their list of the best 100 singles from the 2000s.

== Track listing ==
1. "Northbound Breakdown" – 1:55
2. "Airport Monday Morning" – 2:34
3. "Just a Quiet Evening" – 2:16
4. "Haircuts and T-Shirts" – 1:59
5. "Can't Think About It Now" – 2:44
6. "Spiders in a Garden" – 1:59
7. "Yeems Song for Nothing" – 1:35
8. "Try and Stay Awake" – 2:17
9. "Song for Mel" – 1:10
10. "All Night Long" – 2:11
11. "Records at Nite" – 2:44
