= Two for flinching =

Two for flinching is a children's game in which one person tries to make another person flinch.

Two for flinching or Two For Flinching may also refer to:

- "Two For Flinching", a 1993 single by the punk rock band Kerosene 454
- "Two for Flinching", a song on the 2000 Kid Dynamite hardcore punk album, Shorter, Faster, Louder
- Two For Flinching, a 2006 stand-up comedy CD by Christian Finnegan
