= Fixation on a Co-Worker =

Studio album by Deadguy
- Released: November 20, 1995
- Recorded: March 1995
- Studio: Trax East (South River, New Jersey)
- Genre: Metalcore, mathcore, noise rock
- Length: 30:14
- Label: Victory
- Producer: Steve Evetts, Deadguy

Deadguy chronology
Work Ethic (1994)	Fixation on a Co-Worker (1995)	Screamin' with the Deadguy Quintet (1996)

Deadguy studio album chronology
Fixation on a Co-Worker (1995)	Near-Death Travel Services (2025)

Professional ratings
Review scores
Source	Rating
Alternative Press	3/5 stars
Chronicles of Chaos	6/10
Collector's Guide to Heavy Metal	7/10

Fixation on a Co-Worker is the debut studio album by the American metalcore band Deadguy, released on November 20, 1995 through Victory Records. The album is now considered to have played an important role in the development of the metalcore fusion genre and was included in Decibel Magazine's "Hall of Fame" list in 2006. Terrorizer listed the album as one of the "100 Most Important Albums of the Nineties".

== Music ==
Greg Pratt of Decibel called the album's music "30 minutes of sheer, jagged, labyrinthine mayhem."

== Release ==
The album was originally released on compact disc, vinyl, and cassette formats. The LP edition was pressed on grey and black vinyl. 300 LP copies were packaged in special covers, this edition is known as the "Death To False Metal" pressing. In 2013, Victory Records repressed the album on vinyl format. In total, 1,048 copies were pressed: 100 clear, 409 pink, 377 red, and 162 yellow.

== Track listing ==
No.	Title	Length
1.	"Doom Patrol"	2:48
2.	"Pins And Needles"	2:07
3.	"Die With Your Mask On"	3:15
4.	"Baby Arm"	2:30
5.	"Makeshift Atomsmasher"	2:38
6.	"The Extremist"	3:10
7.	"Nine Stitches"	2:16
8.	"Riot Stairs"	3:43
9.	"Apparatus"	2:06
10.	"Crazy Eddie"	5:44
Total length:		30:14

== Personnel ==
Deadguy

- Tim Singer - vocals
- Chris Corvino - guitar
- Keith Huckins - guitar
- Tim Naumann - bass
- Dave Rosenberg - drums

Production

- Steve Evetts - production
- Alan Douches - mastering
- Jason Hallman - photography
