= A Static Lullaby =

American post-hardcore band

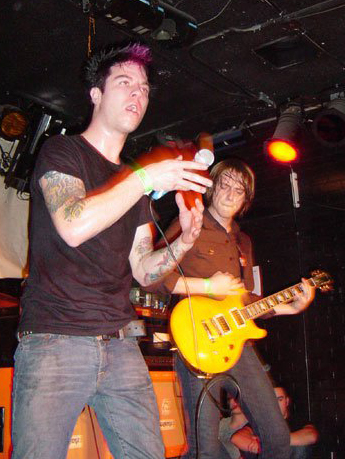
- A Static Lullaby performing in 2011

Background information
- Origin: Chino Hills, California, U.S.
- Genres: Post-hardcore; screamo; alternative rock; emo
- Years active: 2001-2012; 2015-2016; 2024-present
- Labels: A Lullaby Factory; Ferret; Columbia; Fearless
- Members: Joe Brown; Dan Arnold; Kyler Gillam; Nicholas Jones; Kris Comeaux
- Past members: Brett Dinovo; Joey Bradford; Matt Faulkner; Tyler Mahurin; Jarrod Alexander; Nate Lindeman; Phil Pirrone; Dane Poppin; Phil Manansala; John Martinez
- Website: fearlessrecords.com/ASL/palebird astaticlullaby.net

A Static Lullaby is an American post-hardcore band that formed in Chino Hills, California, in 2001.

== History ==
=== Early years and formation (2001–2002) ===
A Static Lullaby came together after a high school jam session led to the members to quit their existing bands and come together as one. The group began with singer Joe Brown, bassist Phil Pirrone, drummer Brett Dinovo, and guitarists Dan Arnold and Nathan Lindeman. Their first show was a mere two weeks after forming, and it started a buzz about the band that continued to be built upon throughout the local circuit.

In September 2001, the band recorded their first home made song called "Withered". They additionally recorded the songs "Love to Hate, Hate to Love", "The Shooting Star That Destroyed Us All", "A Sip of Wine Chased With Cyanide" and "Charred Fields of Snow" for their self-titled demo EP. They then recorded 2 other songs; "A Sip of Wine Chased With Cyanide" and "A Song for a Broken Heart" and released them on the Withered demo EP, which sold 6,000 copies. After the EP's release the band toured across the West Coast.

=== Signing and first two albums (2002–2005) ===
The band signed a contract with Ferret Records in 2002. After this, the band went on to create their first album, ...And Don't Forget to Breathe in early 2003 and spent 18 months on the road supporting it, sharing stages with such acts as AFI, My Chemical Romance and Brand New. During a 16-week tour with Strung Out, drummer Brett Dinovo left the band and was replaced by then guitar tech Ben Newsham. In late 2004 the band recorded a cover of "The Everlasting Gaze", originally by The Smashing Pumpkins, for the album The Killer in You: A Tribute to Smashing Pumpkins. After extensive touring, they signed to Columbia Records and recorded their second album, Faso Latido, which was released on April 5, 2005. It received mixed reviews and they were eventually dropped from Columbia.

In this time, bassist and vocalist Phil Pirrone was involved in a serious car crash, causing him to rethink his life and eventually leave the band. He formed his own record label, Longhair Illuminati, and formed the band Casket Salesmen with guitarist Nathan Lindeman. ASL went on a successful Taste Of Chaos in 2005.

=== A Static Lullaby (2006–2007) ===
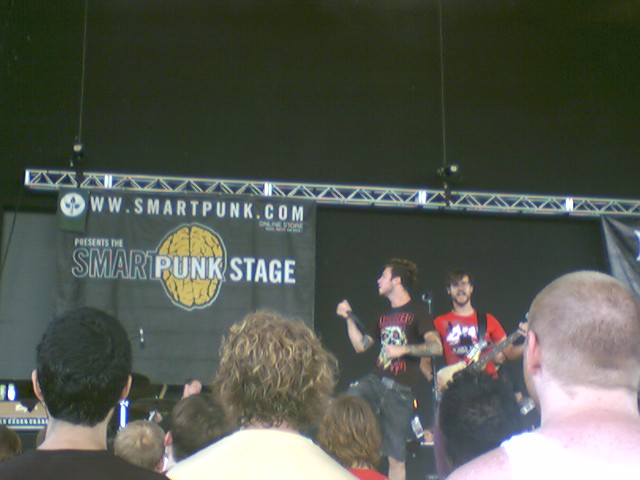
A Static Lullaby in 2007

A Static Lullaby reached a turning point and was signed by Fearless Records. They hunted for new musicians to fill the positions of Phil Pirrone and Nathan Lindeman. After finding John Martinez and Dane Poppin for guitar and bass, respectively, the band recorded their third full-length album. A Static Lullaby was released October 10, 2006, did significantly better than their previous album. The self-titled album returned to the more aggressive style the band had been known for, with a noticeable influence from melodic "guitar pop".

In 2007, the band parted ways with new guitarist John Martinez, and did not look for a replacement. Dane Poppin stated, "We are currently much better off and comfortable as a four-piece." In addition, they found a permanent new drummer, Tyler Mahurin.

=== Rattlesnake! and break-up (2008–2015) ===
The band released a video stating that the title of their new album produced by Steve Evetts was to be titled Rattlesnake!. It was released on September 9, 2008. In November 2008, a tour with Maylene and the Sons of Disaster, Confide, Showbread and Attack Attack! ended.

With the compilation album Punk Goes Pop 2, the band released a post hardcore cover version of "Toxic" by Britney Spears, as well as a related music video featuring several Spears look-alikes wearing various outfits from her music videos.

A Static Lullaby toured most of the 2009 Zumiez Couch Tour with Canadian band, Silverstein. They also performed with the bands Vanna, Asking Alexandria, Motionless in White and Tides of Man for the Blaze of Glory tour.

In June 2010, lead singer Joe Brown started a side project with former guitarist John Martinez and eventual A Static Lullaby guitarist Kris Comeaux called "Elevate: I Am", who released their debut record, The Ghost Eclipse Sessions, in 2011. Brown also signed the San Diego-based band A Shattered Hope to his record label A Lullaby Factory Records.

In 2011, the band released Cinematic Attractions, their first non-album single. It features Dan Arnold performing vocals, guitar and piano, with lyrics by Joe Brown and mixing and mastering done by Kris Comeaux.

Dan Arnold joined the band New Year's Day, playing guitar for the group. He also announced a new project "Ghost Town" on A Static Lullaby's Facebook page in early 2012. Dan Arnold would end up leaving New Year's Day after about a year with the group.

Dane Poppin toured with post-hardcore act Of Mice & Men to fill in for Jaxin Hall who left the band for personal reasons.

Dan Arnold announced on the band's Facebook account on January 10, 2012, that the band would be breaking up and was later confirmed by stating that the band's very last show will be played in Indonesia on July 7, 2012.

Since the band broke up, Dan Arnold, Matt Faulkner, and Kris Comeaux started a band called "Deadhorse" which released a demo track in January 2014. Dane Poppin is currently touring and performing with Twin Forks and Dashboard Confessional, Phil Pirrone plays in his new band JJUUJJUU, and Tyler Mahurin is currently playing with Hollywood Undead.

=== Reunion (Since 2015) ===
On Christmas Eve, 2015, the band announced on their Facebook page that they would return to perform for the first time in four years with four shows in California in 2016 where they played their debut record, ...And Don't Forget to Breathe, in its entirety. The band welcomed back former members John Martinez (Self-Titled era) & Kris Comeaux (Cinematic Attractions era), as well as introducing new member Joey Bradford for the reunion shows. A Static Lullaby returned to their hometown for a successful reunion at the Glasshouse on Saturday, February 27, 2016.

In January 2019, Joe Brown announced on the A Static Lullaby Facebook page that he had started a metal band called Dead Inside with Dave Miller, formerly of Senses Fail.

In June 2024, the band was asked through a post on Instagram to play the 2024 iteration of the California is for Lovers Festival. Through a comment on the post, the band agreed to the request. On November 20, 2024, the band announced they will be playing a headlining show in Orange County on February 8, 2025, with supporting acts The Juliana Theory and A Thorn for every Heart.

== Musical style ==
The band's primary genre was post-hardcore/alternative rock. The band has been compared to AFI, the Used, and My Chemical Romance.

They cited influences including the Used, Rites of Spring, Poison the Well, Hot Water Music, Jimmy Eat World, the Get Up Kids, Saves the Day, Dashboard Confessional, Further Seems Forever, Hot Rod Circuit, the Anniversary, Hey Mercedes, Elliott, Braid, At the Drive-in, Sparta, the Mars Volta, Glassjaw, Refused, NOFX, Pink Floyd, Propagandhi, Nirvana, Operation Ivy, Battery, Gorilla Biscuits, Bane, New Found Glory, Lagwagon, Millencollin and Alkaline Trio.

== Band members ==
Current lineup

- Joe Brown – unclean vocals (2001–2012, 2015–2016, 2024–present)
- Dan Arnold – rhythm guitar, clean vocals, programming, keyboards (2001–2012, 2015–2016, 2024–present)
- Kris Comeaux – drums, percussion (2015–2016, 2024–present); lead guitar (2011–2012)
- Kyler Gillam – bass guitar, backing vocals (2024–present)
- Nicholas Jones – lead guitar (2025–present)

Former members

- Brett Dinovo – drums, percussion (2001–2005, 2011–2012)
- Nate Lindeman – lead guitar (2001–2005)
- Phil Pirrone – bass guitar, clean vocals (2001–2005)
- Dane Poppin – bass guitar, backing vocals (2006–2011)
- Jarrod Alexander – drums, percussion (2006–2007)
- Tyler Mahurin – drums, percussion (2007–2011)
- Phil Manansala – lead guitar (2008–2009)
- Matt Faulkner – bass guitar (2011–2012)
- Joey Bradford – bass guitar, backing vocals (2015–2016)
- John Martinez – lead guitar, backing vocals (2006–2008, 2015–2016, 2024–2025)

Timeline

== Discography ==
=== Studio albums ===
Year	Album	Label	Chart peaks		
Year	Album	Label	US	US Heat	US Indie
2003	...And Don't Forget to Breathe	Ferret	—	—	—
2005	Faso Latido	Columbia	129	3	—
2006	A Static Lullaby	Fearless	173	3	16
2008	Rattlesnake!	Fearless	—	16	50
"—" denotes a release that did not chart.

=== EPs ===
Year	Name	Label
2001	A Static Lullaby	Self-released
2002	Withered	Self-released

=== Singles ===
Year	Name	Album
2003	"The Shooting Star That Destroyed Us"	...And Don't Forget to Breathe
2003	"Lipgloss and Letdown"	...And Don't Forget to Breathe
2005	"Stand Up"	Faso Latido
2006	"Hang 'Em High"	A Static Lullaby
2008	"The Art of Sharing Lovers"	A Static Lullaby
2008	"Toxic"	Rattlesnake!
2009	"Under Water Knife Fight"	Rattlesnake!
2009	"Let Go"	A Static Lullaby (Japanese Edition)
2011	"Cinematic Attractions"	Non-album single
2011	"Party Rock Anthem" (LMFAO cover with Me and the Captain)	Non-album single

== Videography ==
- 2003: "Lipgloss and Letdown"
- 2003: "The Shooting Star That Destroyed Us"
- 2005: "Stand Up"
- 2006: "Hang 'Em High" (Directed by Nicholas Peterson)
- 2008: "The Art of Sharing Lovers"
- 2009: "Toxic" (Britney Spears cover)
