= Shorter, Faster, Louder =

Studio album by Kid Dynamite
- Released: February 29, 2000
- Recorded: September 1–17, 1999 at Trax East in South River, NJ
- Genres: Hardcore punk; pop punk
- Length: 24:49
- Label: Jade Tree
- Producer: Steve Evetts

Kid Dynamite chronology
| Kid Dynamite (1998) | Shorter, Faster, Louder (2000) | Cheap Shots, Youth Anthems (2003) |

Professional ratings
Review scores
| Source | Rating |
|---|---|
| AllMusic | 3/5 stars |
| Punknews.org | 3.5/5 stars |

Shorter, Faster, Louder is the second album by the Philadelphia hardcore punk band Kid Dynamite. Their final album, it was released in 2000 by Jade Tree.

== Critical reception ==
Exclaim! wrote: "Recalling the early punk of Minor Threat and 7 Seconds, [Kid Dynamite] wail and woah about youth culture on standout tracks like 'Living Daylights,' 'Death and Taxes' and 'There's a Party [sic].'" Nuvo called the album "genre-defining." CMJ New Music Report called it "a punk rock marathon, designed for moshing until the audience drops from exhaustion."

== Track listing ==
1. "Pits and Poisoned Apples" - 0:48
2. "Death and Taxes" - 1:52
3. "Cheap Shot Youth Anthem" - 2:10
4. "Cop Out" - 1:30
5. "Handy With the Tongue Sword" - 0:22
6. "Living Daylights" - 1:57
7. "Introduction to the Opposites" - 1:19
8. "Gate 68" - 1:19
9. "Troy's Bucket" - 1:29
10. "Rufus Wants a Hug" - 1:45
11. "Got a Minute?" - 1:00
12. "The Penske File" - 0:23
13. "Rid of the Losers, Bring on the Cruisers" - 1:53
14. "Three's a Party" - 1:03
15. "S.O.S." - 1:42
16. "Two for Flinching" - 0:10
17. "Birthday" - 2:34
18. "Give 'em the Ripped One" - 1:58

== Credits ==
- Jason Shevchuk – vocals
- Dr. Dan Yemin – guitar
- Michael Cotterman – bass
- Dave Wagenschutz – drums
- Dave Hause – backing vocals
- Ernie Parada – additional vocals on "Birthday," backing vocals
- Alison Mennor – additional vocals on "Three's A Party"
