= Epidemic of Violence =

Studio album by Demolition Hammer
- Released: March 23, 1992
- Recorded: January 1992
- Studios: Normandy Sound, Warren, Rhode Island
- Genres: Thrash metal; death metal
- Length: 39:33
- Label: Century Media
- Producer: Tom Soares

Demolition Hammer chronology
Tortured Existence (1991)	Epidemic of Violence (1992)	Time Bomb (1994)

Professional ratings
Review scores
Source	Rating
Rock Hard	9.5/10
Metal.de	8/10

Epidemic of Violence is the second album by American thrash metal band Demolition Hammer. It was released in early 1992 to critical acclaim and is considered a cult classic in the thrash metal and death metal genres.

Epidemic of Violence uses a Michael Whelan painting for its cover artwork: Lovecraft's Nightmare B. The first half of the painting, Lovecraft's Nightmare A, was used for Obituary's Cause of Death.

== Reception and legacy ==
In 2017, Loudwire placed Epidemic of Violence at number 49 on their "Top 50 Thrash Metal Albums" list. Eduardo Rivadavia noted how Demolition Hammer managed to sustain their thrash metal sound during the rise of grunge, comparing them to other bands in the thrash genre who were going for a more commercial sound. Loudwire also named Epidemic of Violence the best thrash metal album of 1992 and called it a cult classic.

On June 24, 2017, Demolition Hammer performed Epidemic of Violence in its entirety at the Gramercy Theater in New York City in celebration of the album's 25th anniversary.

== Track listing ==
No.	Title	Length
1.	"Skull Fracturing Nightmare"	5:44
2.	"Human Dissection"	5:04
3.	"Pyroclastic Annihilation"	4:55
4.	"Envenomed"	3:14
5.	"Carnivorous Obsession"	5:52
6.	"Orgy of Destruction" (instrumental)	0:51
7.	"Epidemic of Violence"	4:20
8.	"Omnivore"	4:36
9.	"Aborticide"	4:57

=== 2008 re-release live bonus tracks ===
No.	Title	Length
10.	"Mercenary Aggression"	3:02
11.	"Cataclysm"	5:32
12.	"Crippling Velocity"	5:34
13.	"Carnivorous Obsession"	4:59

== Personnel ==
Demolition Hammer

- Steve Reynolds – lead vocals, bass
- James Reilly – guitar, backing vocals
- Derek Sykes – guitar, backing vocals
- Vinny Daze – drums, backing vocals

Production

- Produced by Tom Soares and Demolition Hammer
- Mixed by Tom Soares and Demolition Hammer
- Recorded and Engineered by Tom Soares
- Red "Lunchbox" Bortolotti – assistant engineer
- Mastered by Howie Weinberg at Masterdisk, New York
