= Faso Latido =

Studio album by A Static Lullaby
- Released: April 5, 2005
- Recorded: Indigo Ranch Studios (Malibu, California): Ocean Studios (Burbank, California)
- Genre: Post-hardcore; alternative rock
- Length: 50:45
- Label: Columbia
- Producer: Lou Giordano

A Static Lullaby chronology
...And Don't Forget to Breathe (2003)	Faso Latido (2005)	A Static Lullaby (2006)

Singles from Faso Latido
- 1. "Stand Up" Released: 2005 (UK)

Professional ratings
Review scores
Source	Rating
AbsolutePunk	(32%)
Allmusic	3/5 stars
Melodic.net	2.5/5 stars
Punknews.org	1.5/5 stars

Faso Latido is the second album by post-hardcore band A Static Lullaby. It was released in 2005 on Columbia Records, making it their only release on a major label. This album is one of the albums known to be affected by Extended Copy Protection. This is the last album with all five original members. Before Phil Pirrone and Nate Lindeman left to form Casket Salesmen as well as the departure of former drummer Brett Dinovo. The album was originally to be titled "Watch the Sunlight Burn", but was changed prior to its release. A music video was created for the song "Stand Up".

== Background ==
Shortly after the release of their debut, ...And Don't Forget to Breathe, the band was signed to major label Columbia Records. The song "Radio Flyer's Last Journey" originally appeared on the band's self-titled demo EP, released in 2001.

== Reception ==
Faso Latido was generally met with negative feedback. The band treats this album just like Weezer's Pinkerton and the members of the band openly admit they dislike this album. When playing songs from the album live, they apologize to the fans for playing the song. However, many fans cite this album as the best from A Static Lullaby.

Absolute Punk reviewer Scott Weber was very critical of the album, particularly for the high amounts of clean singing. Weber said the screams in "Stand Up" were awkward and out of place with the "laid back musicianship" and the song sounded like any other radio song with screaming. He did however praise the song "Radio Flyer's Last Journey" for its energy.

A more positive review came from Melodic.net's Kaj Roth. Roth commented on the more commercial and melodic sound of the album, and said fans of the debut ...And Don't Forget to Breathe would be very disappointed. Roth concluded by saying the band's energy and attitude make up for the change in sound, but said the album doesn't have many stand out tracks. Another positive review came from Allmusic. The reviewer praised "Radio Flyer's Last Journey" for its chugging guitar riffs and "Half Man, Half Shark; Equals One Complete Gentleman" for use of a delay-pedal. Another praise was the band's lyrical content, which was different from "the usual emo notebook romance".

Though the album received lukewarm reception from both fans and critics, Faso Latido is the band's highest charting album on the Billboard 200, charting at no. 129.

In a retrospective review, musician Diegetic, writing for Lonely Ghost Records, praised the album for its use of dynamics and unique production techniques that were not common in post-hardcore at the time.

=== Copy protection controversy ===
In November 2005, it was revealed that Sony BMG was distributing albums with Extended Copy Protection, a controversial feature that automatically installed rootkit software on any Microsoft Windows machine upon insertion of the disc. In addition to preventing the CDs contents from being copied, it was also revealed that the software reported the users' listening habits back to Sony BMG and also exposed the computer to malicious attacks that exploited insecure features of the rootkit software. Faso Latido was listed among the 52 CDs that were known to contain the software, which Sony discontinued the usage of on November 11, 2005. The company recalled this and other titles affected by XCP, and asked customers to return copies affected by the software to Sony BMG in exchange for copies in which the software was absent.

== Track listing ==
All lyrics written by Joe Brown and Dan Arnold, all music composed by A Static Lullaby

No.	Title	Length
1.	"Overture"	1:12
2.	"Smooth Modulator"	3:30
3.	"Stand Up"	3:42
4.	"Radio Flyer's Last Journey"	4:45
5.	"Cash Cowbell"	3:42
6.	"Half Man, Half Shark; Equals One Complete Gentleman"	3:30
7.	"Shotgun!"	4:37
8.	"Calmer Than You Are"	5:04
9.	"Faso Latido"	4:16
10.	"God Bless You (Goddamn It)"	3:58
11.	"Marilyn Monrobot"	3:48
12.	"Modern Day Fire"	3:26
13.	"The Jesus Haircut"	5:18
Total length:		50:45

Japanese bonus track
No.	Title	Length
14.	"Octarene"	3:55

== Personnel ==
A Static Lullaby

- Joe Brown – unclean vocals
- Dan Arnold – rhythm guitar, clean vocals, piano, programming, keyboards
- Nate Lindeman – lead guitar
- Phil Pirrone – bass guitar, clean vocals
- Brett Dinovo – drums, percussion

Additional musicians

- Jeff Jenkins – additional vocals
- Sammy Siegler – additional drums
- Angus Cooke – cello

Production

- Lou Giordano – producer, mixing
- Ted Jensen – mastering
- Todd Parker – engineer
- Alex Pavlides – assistant engineer
- Ben Kane – assistant engineer
- Chuck Johnson – assistant engineer
- Matt Green – assistant engineer
- Jon Nicholson – drum technician

Layout

- Brandy Flower – art direction
- Sean Murphy – photography
