= Cheap Shots, Youth Anthems =

Compilation album by Kid Dynamite
- Released: 2003
- Genre: Punk rock
- Length: 48:15
- Label: Jade Tree

Kid Dynamite chronology
Shorter, Faster, Louder (2000)	Cheap Shots, Youth Anthems (2003)

Professional ratings
Review scores
Source	Rating
Allmusic	3/5 stars
Punknews	4/5 stars

Cheap Shots, Youth Anthems is an album released in 2003 by American punk rock band Kid Dynamite on Jade Tree. The album consists of covers, demos, live tracks and songs previously released on other albums. The cover is a tribute to The Who's album Odds & Sods.

== Track list ==
No.	Title	Length
1.	"Heart a Tact"	1:31
2.	"Breakin' a Memory"	1:13
3.	"Give 'Em the Ripped One"	1:48
4.	"Two for Flinching"	0:10
5.	"Rise Above" (Black Flag cover)	2:23
6.	"Deny Everything" (Circle Jerks cover)	0:35
7.	"Hateful" (The Clash cover)	2:47
8.	"I Don't Want to Hear It" (Minor Threat cover)	1:13
9.	"Macho Insecurities" (Dead Kennedys cover)	1:30
10.	"Showoff"	1:16
11.	"Sweet Shop Syndicate"	0:19
12.	"Never Met the Gooch"	1:58
13.	"Fuckuturn"	1:42
14.	"Scary Smurf"	0:21
15.	"Ronald Miller Story"	1:00
16.	"Bookworm" (demo)	2:14
17.	"Unheard Chorus" (demo)	2:10
18.	"32 Frames Per Second" (demo)	0:19
19.	"Wrist Wrocket" (demo)	1:36
20.	"News at 11" (demo)	1:09
21.	"Death & Taxes" (demo)	1:48
22.	"S.O.S." (live)	2:48
23.	"Heart a Tact" (live)	2:03
24.	"Handy With the Tongue Sword" (live)	2:10
25.	"K05-0564" (live)	2:27
26.	"Never Met the Gooch" (live)	6:21
27.	"Penske File" (live)	1:09
28.	"Ph. Decontrol" (live)	0:46
29.	"Deny Everything" (live)	1:25
30.	"Untitled"	0:04
