= Screamin' with the Deadguy Quintet =

- Cropped cover used on CD. The cassette and vinyl editions show a wider image.

EP by Deadguy
- Released: December 3, 1996
- Genre: Metalcore, mathcore, noise rock
- Length: 18:26
- Label: Victory Records
- Producer: Steve Austin, Deadguy

Deadguy chronology
Fixation on a Co-Worker (1995)	Screamin' with the Deadguy Quintet (1996)	I Know Your Tragedy: Live at CBGBs (2000)

Professional ratings
Review scores
Source	Rating
AllMusic	3/5 stars
Collector's Guide to Heavy Metal	6/10
Metal Hammer	3/5 stars
Ox-Fanzine	5/5 stars

Screamin' with the Deadguy Quintet is an extended play by American metalcore band Deadguy, which was released on compact disc, compact cassette, and 10" vinyl formats through Victory Records on December 3, 1996. It is the only recording by the group to not feature vocalist Tim Singer and guitarist Keith Huckins, and has been noted on showing a shift in style for the band.

Pre-production for the recording began shortly after the band's 1995 tour, which resulted in line-up changes due to personal tensions between members. Most tracks on the disc were written in the home of Jim Baglino, guitarist of Human Remains. Beglino would then join the band as their bassist, as their original bassist Tim Naumann became their vocalist. The band hired Steve Austin, frontman of Today Is the Day, to record and produce the record. The album's name is a reference to the Miles Davis album Steamin' With the Miles Davis Quintet.

== Track listing ==
No.	Title	Length
1.	"Human Pig"	2:53
2.	"(Escape from) the Fake Clink"	2:23
3.	"Turk 182"	2:27
4.	"Free Mustache Rides"	2:14
5.	"Angry Dwarf"	3:53
6.	"Prosthetic Head" (Unlisted track)	4:37

== Personnel ==
- Jim Baglino - bass
- Dave Rosenburg - drums
- Tom Yak - guitar
- Tim "Pops" Naumann - vocals
- Chris "Crispy" Corvino - guitar, vocals
- Dave - artwork
- Tom B - artwork
- Rick Deardof - engineering
- Steve Austin - production, engineering
