= Time Bomb (Demolition Hammer album) =

Studio album by Demolition Hammer
- Released: August 23, 1994
- Genre: Groove metal
- Length: 37:26
- Label: Century Media
- Producer: Steve Evetts

Demolition Hammer chronology
| Epidemic of Violence (1992) | Time Bomb (1994) |

Time Bomb is the third album by the American metal band Demolition Hammer, Released on August 23, 1994. It is the only Demolition Hammer album to feature drummer Alex Marquez, as well as the only one not to feature guitarist James Reilly and drummer Vinny Daze, the two of whom had left the band in order to form the short-lived group Deviate NY. Time Bomb was not originally intended to be released under the Demolition Hammer name, given its musical difference from the band's earlier work. It was their last studio album before their 21-year breakup from 1995 to 2016.

The entirety of the album's brief, untitled opening track was taken from the 1981 film Prince Of The City. "Under The Table" features a number of samples taken from movies including the 1973 film Serpico and the 1983 film Scarface.

The album presented a change in style for the band, from the death/thrash metal sound of the first two albums to a slower groove metal style.

== Track listing ==
| No. | Title | Length |
|---|---|---|
| 1. | "Untitled" | 0:16 |
| 2. | "Under the Table" | 3:23 |
| 3. | "Power Struggle" | 5:00 |
| 4. | "Mindrot" | 3:16 |
| 5. | "Bread and Water" | 3:42 |
| 6. | "Missing: 5/7/89" | 3:51 |
| 7. | "Waste" | 3:36 |
| 8. | "Unidentified" | 3:48 |
| 9. | "Blowtorch" | 3:43 |
| 10. | "Mongoloid" (Devo cover) | 3:32 |
| 11. | "Time Bomb" | 3:15 |

== Personnel ==
- Steve Reynolds: Bass, vocals
- Derek Sykes: Guitar
- Alex Marquez: Drums
