= Tortured Existence =

Studio album by Demolition Hammer
- Released: August 27, 1990 (Europe); February 12, 1991 (US)
- Recorded: 1990
- Studio: Morrisound Recording, Tampa, Florida
- Genre: Thrash metal; death metal
- Length: 43:26
- Label: Century Media
- Producer: Scott Burns

Demolition Hammer chronology
Necrology (1989)	Tortured Existence (1990)	Epidemic of Violence (1992)

Professional ratings
Review scores
Source	Rating
Rock Hard	8.5/10
Metal.de	8/10

Tortured Existence is the debut album by American thrash metal band Demolition Hammer. It was released on August 27, 1990, in Europe and on February 12, 1991, in the US by Century Media Records.

A music video was made for "Infectious Hospital Waste".

== Track listing ==
No.	Title	Length
1.	".44 Caliber Brain Surgery"	4:28
2.	"Neanderthal"	5:04
3.	"Gelid Remains"	5:23
4.	"Crippling Velocity"	5:45
5.	"Infectious Hospital Waste"	5:01
6.	"Hydrophobia"	3:10
7.	"Paracidal Epitaph"	5:30
8.	"Mercenary Aggression"	3:25

CD bonus track
No.	Title	Length
9.	"Cataclysm"	5:52

2008 remaster bonus tracks
No.	Title	Length
10.	"Hydrophobia" (live)	3:06
11.	"Infectious Hospital Waste" (live)	4:39
12.	".44 Caliber Brain Surgery" (live)	4:02
13.	"Neanderthal" (live)	4:31
14.	"Crippling Velocity" (live)	5:10

== Credits ==
- Steve Reynolds – lead vocals, bass
- James Reilly – guitar, backing vocals
- Derek Sykes – guitar, backing vocals
- Vinny Daze – drums, backing vocals
