= Underground Sounds =

Studio album by Lexia
- Released: October 12, 2010
- Recorded: 2010
- Studios: Shire Recorders, Austin, Texas
- Genres: Acoustic, indie pop, indie electronic, alternative rock, emo-pop
- Length: 41:25
- Label: BreakSilence
- Producers: Kevin Zinger, Brad X, and Thom Flowers

Singles from Underground Sounds
- 1. "Let Me In" Released: October 26, 2010

Professional ratings
Review scores
Source	Rating
Alter The Press!	3/5 link
The NewReview	link
The PunkSite	link
Sputnikmusic	link

Underground Sounds is the debut album of American recording artist and guitarist of Eyes Set to Kill, Lexia. The album was released October 12, 2010, by BreakSilence Records. Recording took place at Shire Recorders, Austin, Texas. The album is different from her band because it is pop. The album consists of new original pop, acoustic, and electronica songs as well as covers from her band (done acoustically) and a Radiohead cover. "Let Me In" was released as the first single with a video which is featured as a bonus track on Broken Frames.

== Track listing ==
1. Intro – 0:48
2. Basements – 3:19
3. Climbing Up the Walls (Radiohead Cover) – 3:31
4. Let Me In – 4:13
5. Over – 3:58
6. Come Home – 4:11
7. Still Here – 3:07
8. Memories – 3:10
9. World Outside – 3:32
10. Reach – 3:59
11. Waste – 3:18
12. Come Home (Acoustic) – 4:19

== Credits ==
Band

- Lexia – vocals, guitars, keyboards, synthesizers, piano, programming

Production

- Kevin Zinger – executive producer
- Brad X – executive producer
- Thom Flowers – audio mixer, engineer, producer
- David Aguilera – management
- Casey Quintal – art director
- Nathaniel Taylor – photography

Additional musicians

- Angus Cooke – cello
- Tom Breyfogle – programming
- Mike Kumagai – programming
- David Aguilera – programming
