= Mad at Gravity =

American rock band

- Origin: California, United States
- Genres: Rock, nu metal; progressive rock
- Years active: 2001–2003
- Labels: ARTISTdirect; BMG
- Past members: J. Lynn Johnston; James Lee Barlow; Anthony "Bosco" Boscarini; Ben Froehlich; Jake Fowler

Mad at Gravity was a short lived rock band performing from 2001 to 2003. The band's name came from a poem which lead singer J. Lynn Johnston wrote at 19, saying that it "just jumped out" and "it had so many applications."

== History ==
The band formed in Southern California in 2000. They were signed and began recording in a studio after having only made about a dozen live appearances. Their debut album Resonance was released under ARTISTdirect records. Resonance peaked at No. 41 on the Billboard Heatseekers chart.

In promotion of the album, the band toured with acts including Creed, Filter, Sevendust, and Jerry Cantrell (of Alice in Chains).

"Walk Away" was the band's first and only single and it reached No. 38 on the Billboard Mainstream Rock charts. Its music video contains sequences from the film Reign of Fire, and is also played in the movie's closing credits along another track of theirs, "Burn". The band disintegrated in 2003, after vocalist J. Lynn Johnston left the band due to creative differences and the four remaining members were unable to find a suitable replacement.

== Discography ==
Studio albums

- 2002: Resonance

== Band members ==
- J. Lynn Johnston - vocals
- James Lee Barlow - guitar, keyboards, backing vocals
- Anthony Boscarini - guitar, piano, keyboards
- Ben Froehlich - bass
- Jake Fowler - drums
