= Eyes Set to Kill (album) =

Studio album by Eyes Set to Kill
- Released: February 16, 2018
- Length: 38:09
- Label: Century Media
- Producer: Joe Graves, Sam Graves

Eyes Set to Kill chronology
| Masks (2013) | Eyes Set to Kill (2018) |

Eyes Set to Kill is the sixth studio album by American metalcore band Eyes Set to Kill, released on February 16, 2018 via Century Media Records. In March 2017, "Break" was released as the first single from the album. The album is the first by the band to not include any screaming vocals.

== Track listing ==
Adapted from Brave Words.

| No. | Title | Length |
|---|---|---|
| 1. | "Burn Down" | 0:53 |
| 2. | "Die Trying" | 3:35 |
| 3. | "Not Sorry" | 3:46 |
| 4. | "Break" | 3:09 |
| 5. | "Survive" | 3:15 |
| 6. | "Never Forget" | 3:36 |
| 7. | "Saved You with a Lie" | 3:25 |
| 8. | "Devastated" | 4:01 |
| 9. | "Letting Go" | 3:45 |
| 10. | "Drift Away" | 3:17 |
| 11. | "Misery" | 3:08 |
| 12. | "Voices" | 2:46 |
| 13. | "Who We Used to Be" | 2:58 |
| Total length: | | 38:09 |

== Credits ==
Band

- Alexia Rodriguez – vocals, guitars, bass
- Anissa Rodriguez – bass guitar
- Caleb Clifton – drums, percussion

Additional personnel

- Joe Graves – composer, production, mastering, mixing
- Sam Graves – composer, production, mastering, mixing
- Mitch Marlow – composer
- Sahaj Ticotin – composer
- Kane Churko – composer
- Rob Walden – design, art direction

== Charts ==
| Chart (2018) | Peak position |
|---|---|
| US Heatseekers Albums (Billboard) | 22 |
