= Broken Frames =

Studio album by Eyes Set to Kill
- Released: June 8, 2010
- Recorded: Ocala, Florida
- Genres: Post-hardcore; screamo
- Length: 37:01
- Labels: BreakSilence, Koch, Suburban Noize
- Producers: Kevin Zinger, Brad X, Dave Aguilera, Andrew Wade

Eyes Set to Kill chronology
The World Outside (2009)	Broken Frames (2010)	White Lotus (2011)

Singles from Broken Frames
- 1. "All You Ever Knew" Released: April 1, 2010; 2. "Broken Frames" Released: July 29, 2010

Broken Frames is the third studio album by American rock band Eyes Set to Kill. The album was released on June 8, 2010 by Break Silence Records. The album consists of 12 songs and DVD of their interviews and music videos from Reach to Deadly Weapons. It is the only album to feature unclean vocalist Justin Denson, who departed shortly after the release and was replaced by Cisco Miranda.

The album was announced after the release of the lead single, "All You Ever Knew," released on April 1, 2010. Title-track "Broken Frames" was released as the follow-up second single accompanied with a music video. "Let Me In" was released as Lexia's first single under her solo album, Underground Sounds.

The album is Eyes Set to Kill's highest debut to date in the Independent Albums, and the first to enter Top Hard Rock Albums. The album was ranked fifth of "Locals Only: The Best Albums and EPs in 2010."

== Track listing ==
All tracks are written by Eyes Set to Kill.

Disc 1
No.	Title	Length
1.	"All You Ever Knew"	3:10
2.	"Broken Frames"	2:53
3.	"The Listening"	3:33
4.	"Ticking Bombs"	3:34
5.	"Play the Part"	2:39
6.	"Falling Fast"	3:34
7.	"Catch Your Breath"	0:27
8.	"Ryan"	3:10
9.	"Inside the Eye"	3:23
10.	"Two Letter Sins"	3:01
11.	"Escape"	4:19
12.	"Let Me In"	4:18
Total length:		37:01

Bonus DVD
No.	Title	Length
13.	"Interviews"
14.	"Darling" (Music video)	4:06
15.	"Reach" (Music video)	3:46
16.	"Heights" (Music video)	3:28
17.	"The World Outside" (Music video)	3:44
18.	"Deadly Weapons" (Music video)	4:29

=== Singles ===
"All You Ever Knew" was released April 1, 2010 as the lead single prior of the album. No music video was filmed.
"Broken Frames", the title track, was released July 2010 as the second single with a music video premiered on July 29, 2010.

== Critical reception ==
Professional ratings
Review scores
Source	Rating
Sputnikmusic	3.5/5 stars
411mania	7.5/10 stars
Bring on Mixed Reviews	3/5 stars
PopMatters	6/10 stars
The NewReview	2.5/5 stars
Decoy Music	2/5 stars

Sputnikmusic states "Once again, Eyes Set To Kill recycle and refine themselves into something every label lusts for, emphasizing confidence and consistency over innovation." The 411: Eyes Set To Kill’s latest record is by far their best written and produced, but it still lacks some of the truly amazing songs to make them a glowing example of the genre. Pernell Fowler of Bring on the Mixed Reviews states "And even with the speed bump that is their current screaming vocalist and sounding very familiar to already cemented bands, ala A Skylit Drive, Blessthefall, and LoveHateHero, Eyes Set To Kill has a few unabated tracks that sound too powerful/beautiful to be ignored." Chris Colgan of PopMatters said "Broken Frames isn’t mind-blowing, but it’s a solid album."

Josh Velliquette of The NewReview states "Broken Frames is an album tugged between two styles – competent, yet harmless post-hardcore and superb, ear-catching rock." Jake Oliver of Decoy Music states "Broken Frames is torn between two worlds, and it is desperately seeking some sort of resolution, making it feel frustratingly incomplete."

== Chart performance ==
On July 26, 2010, the album debuted at #8 in Top Heatseekers, at #35 in Independent Albums, and at #21 in Top Hard Rock Albums.

=== Charts ===
Chart (2009)	Peak position
Top Heatseekers	8
Independent Albums	35
Top Hard Rock Albums	21

== Credits ==
Band

- Justin Denson - unclean vocals, clean vocals (tracks 8 & 9)
- Alexia Rodriguez - clean vocals, lead and acoustic guitars, piano, keyboards, programming
- Greg Kerwin - rhythm guitar
- Anissa Rodriguez - bass
- Caleb Clifton - drums, percussion, samples

Additional musicians

- Andrew Wade - vocals
- Tom Breyfogle - programming
- Jakub Andrew - programming

Production

- Kevin Zinger - producer
- Brad X - producer
- Dave Aguilera - producer, management
- Tom Baker - mastering
- Sarah Ellis - stylist
- Jefferson Fernandez - art direction
- Thomas Flowers - engineer, mixing, producer
- Breanna Little - hair stylist, make up
- Casey Quintal - design
- Nathaniel Taylor - photography
- Andrew Wade - engineer, mixing, producer
