= White Lotus (album) =

Studio album by Eyes Set to Kill
- Released: August 9, 2011
- Recorded: April – May 2011
- Genre: Post-hardcore; melodic metalcore; alternative rock; alternative metal
- Length: 31:58
- Label: Foresee Records, Maphia Management
- Producer: Andrew Wade

Eyes Set to Kill chronology
Broken Frames (2010)	White Lotus (2011)	Masks (2013)

Singles from White Lotus
- 1. "The Secrets Between" Released: June 7, 2011

Professional ratings
Review scores
Source	Rating
AllMusic	3/5 stars
Alternative Press	2.5/5 stars
Alter the Press	2.5/5 stars

White Lotus is the fourth full-length album by American post-hardcore band Eyes Set to Kill. The album was released on August 9, 2011. This is the first album to feature unclean vocalist and guitarist Cisko Miranda. It is also the first full length not to feature ex-guitarist, Greg Kerwin. Furthermore, it's their first album to be released under Maphia Records, Pre-orders for the album went up at 12 P.M. PST on July 7, 2011. Polly was given as a free download with the pre-orders and Harsh was streamed on sound cloud on July 8. Track 6, "Erasing Everything" is a remake of their song "Pure White Lace", which was originally released on their 2006 EP When Silence is Broken, the Night is Torn.

== Track listing ==
No.	Title	Length
1.	"The Secrets Between"	3:47
2.	"Forget"	3:21
3.	"Stuck Underneath"	1:30
4.	"Harsh"	3:49
5.	"Where I Want to Be"	3:17
6.	"Erasing Everything"	3:52
7.	"Doll Parts" (Hole cover)	3:16
8.	"Untitled"	2:38
9.	"Polly" (Nirvana cover)	3:05
10.	"Harsh" (Acoustic)	3:25
Total length:		32:00

=== Singles ===
The Secrets Between is the first single that was released from the album. It was streamed on revolvermag.com and released on the Warped Tour Compilation on June 7 and it was given as a free track on June 10. Harsh was released as the second single from White Lotus.

== Credits ==
White Lotus album personnel as listed on Allmusic.

Band

- Cisko Miranda – unclean vocals
- Alexia Rodriguez – clean vocals, lead guitar, piano
- Anissa Rodriguez – bass
- Caleb Clifton – drums, percussion

Production

- Jeff Brockman – producer (tracks 7–10)
- Jiri Dosoudil – photography
- Casey Quintal – layout
- Alexia Rodriguez – art conception
- Sergey Rykov – photography
- Nathan Taylor – photography
- Andrew Wade – producer (tracks 1–6), engineer, mixing
