= Background (Lifetime album) =

Studio album by Lifetime
- Released: January 1, 1993
- Genre: Melodic hardcore
- Length: 31:08
- Label: New Age

Lifetime chronology
Background (1993)	Hello Bastards (1995)

Background is the first LP by American punk band Lifetime. It was recorded in 1992 and was released on January 1, 1993, as New Age Records #15. The CD version was re-issued on July 1, 1997, with nine live bonus tracks. It is currently out of print although all the songs including the live bonus tracks are available on the Somewhere in the Swamps of Jersey collection. The European edition of the album is titled Ghost and has different artwork and track listing. Ghost was released by Break Even Point Records as a 12" vinyl LP with a limited pressing of 1,000.

Shortly before the album was released, the bass guitarist Justin Janisch was replaced by Linda Kay. Even though Janisch played bass guitar on the record, Kay appears in the group photograph on the back of the album.

== Track listing ==
All songs recorded and mixed at SRA Music Studio in Scotch Plains, New Jersey, during spring and summer 1992

1. "You"
2. "Pieces"
3. "Myself"
4. "Thanks"
5. "Up"
6. "Bedtime"
7. "Old Friend"
8. "Ghost"
9. "Alive"
10. "Background"

=== 1997 CD bonus tracks ===
All bonus tracks were recorded live at Lost Horizons in Syracuse, New York, on July 5, 1992.

11. "You"
12. "Ghost"
13. "Thanks"
14. "Dwell"
15. "Up"
16. "Alive"
17. "Gone"
18. "Bedtime"
19. "Background"

== Personnel ==
- Ari Katz - vocals
- Dan Yemin - guitar
- Scott Saint Hilaire - guitar
- Justin Janisch - bass guitar
- David Wagenshutz - drums
