= Demolition Hammer =

American thrash metal band

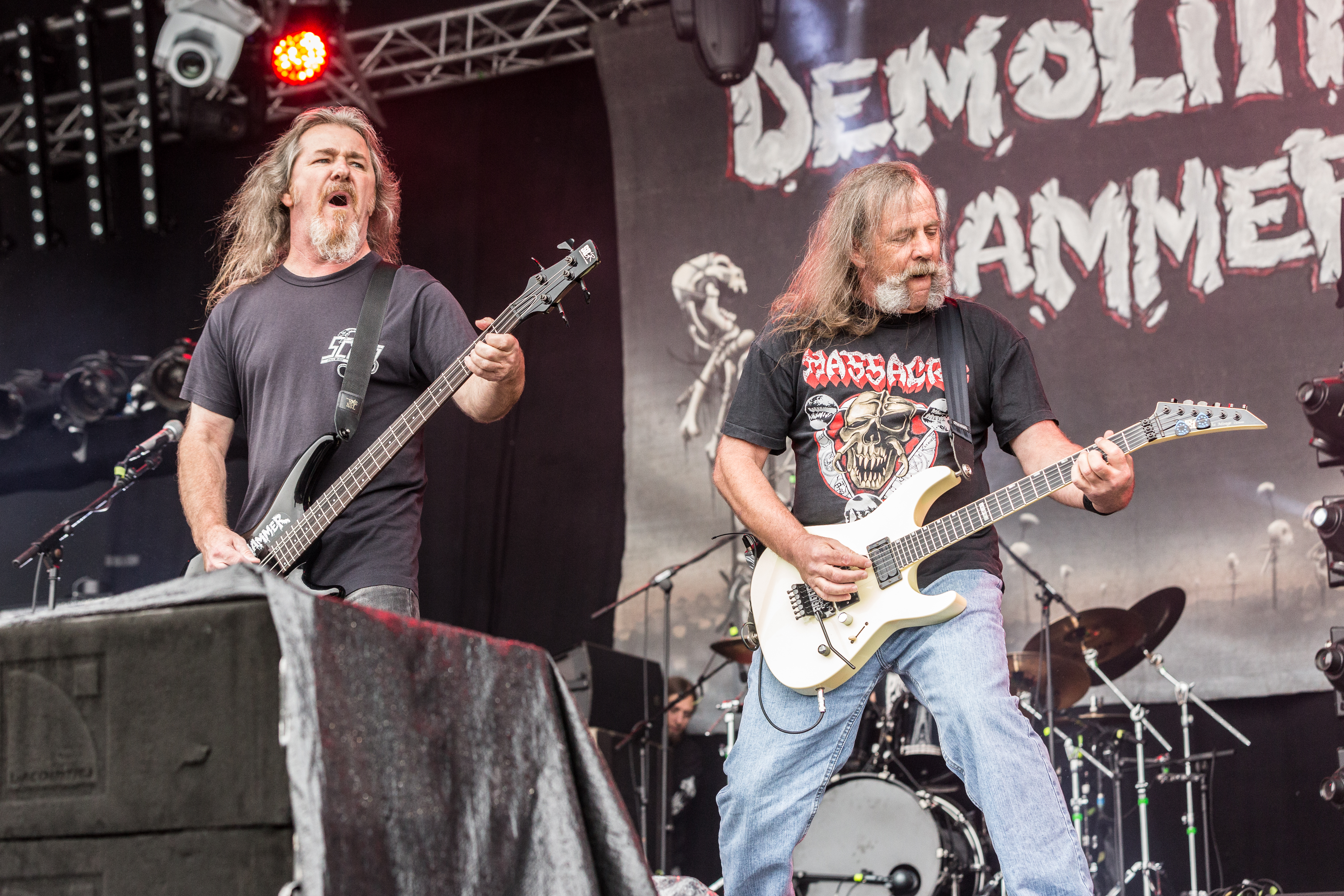
- Demolition Hammer at Party.San Metal Open Air 2017

Background information
- Origin: The Bronx, New York, U.S.
- Genres: Thrash metal; death metal
- Years active: 1986–1995, 2016–present
- Label: Century Media
- Members: Steve Reynolds; James Reilly; Derek Sykes; Angel Cotte
- Past members: John Salerno; Dennis Munoz; Vinny Daze; Alex Marquez; Mike Usifer

Demolition Hammer is an American thrash metal band formed in 1986 in the Bronx, New York by bassist and lead vocalist Steve Reynolds, guitarist James Reily, and drummer John Salerno. While not as popular as other East Coast thrash metal bands like Anthrax, Overkill and Nuclear Assault, their first two albums, Tortured Existence (1990) and Epidemic of Violence (1992), are considered thrash and death metal cult classics. The band's third and final album, Time Bomb (1994), has a slower, groove metal style, which led to the departure of Reily and drummer Vinny Daze. The band disbanded a year after its release, but reunited as a quartet in 2016. This line-up, with drummer Angel Cotte and secondary guitarist Derek Sykes, is exclusively a touring band, with no new releases since the compilation album Necrology: A Complete Anthology (2008).

Demolition Hammer has released three studio albums, all of which have been out of print for years, as well as one compilation album and two demo tapes. Despite their small discography, the band is seen as pioneers of deathrash, a fusion genre combining thrash metal with death metal, alongside Possessed and Sepultura. Joe Divita of Loudwire described the band as "thrash’s best kept secret" with "trench-digging riffs" and a "constant sense of groove."

== History ==
=== Formation and first two albums (1986–1992) ===
Demolition Hammer arrived on the East Coast thrash metal scene circa 1986. The original lineup consisted of Steve Reynolds as the vocalist and on bass, James Reilly on guitar, and John Salerno on drums. Their first demo tape, Skull Fracturing Nightmare, was released in 1988. It gained notice from fans of the genre and independent record labels. Derek Sykes was brought in as a second guitarist and Vincent Civitano (a.k.a. Vinny Daze) replaced Salerno. Their second demo, Necrology, secured the group a recording contract with Century Media Records.

Their first album Tortured Existence, produced by Scott Burns with a small budget, was released in early 1991. The songs were composed with fast riffs, chunky breakdowns, and expressive guitar solos. In 1992, the band released their critically acclaimed album Epidemic of Violence. The production was clearer and included faster and leaner songs. The covers of these first two releases featured horror based artwork and a logo designed by Daze.

=== Time Bomb and breakup (1993–2015) ===
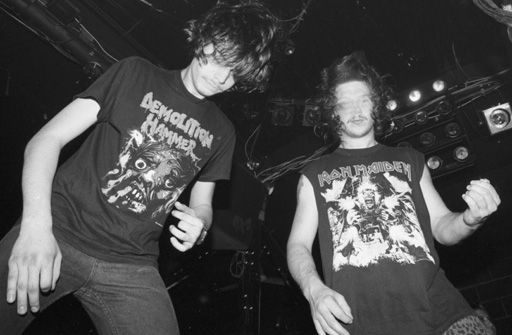
Demolition Hammer T-shirt (left) in Germany, 1994

Fast-paced thrash metal became less popular in the '90s. Daze and Reilly left the band to form the group Deviate NY. Former Malevolent Creation drummer Alex Marquez joined Reynolds and Sykes to write material for another project. The label wished to release the songs with the band's original name. The result was the 1994 album Time Bomb with a new Demolition Hammer logo on the cover. It was slower and lacked guitar solos. The style was similar to that of groups like Pantera and Machine Head. After playing one of their final shows at Milwaukee MetalFest in the summer of 1995, Demolition Hammer broke up.

Marquez and Reynolds were offered new gigs with Solstice. Daze died of globefish poisoning while traveling in Africa on March 11, 1996. With Demolition Hammer's music becoming increasingly hard to come by, Century Media released Necrology: A Complete Anthology in 2008. It included every title from their first three albums, two pre-production demos from Time Bomb, and one video clip.

=== Reunion (2016–present) ===
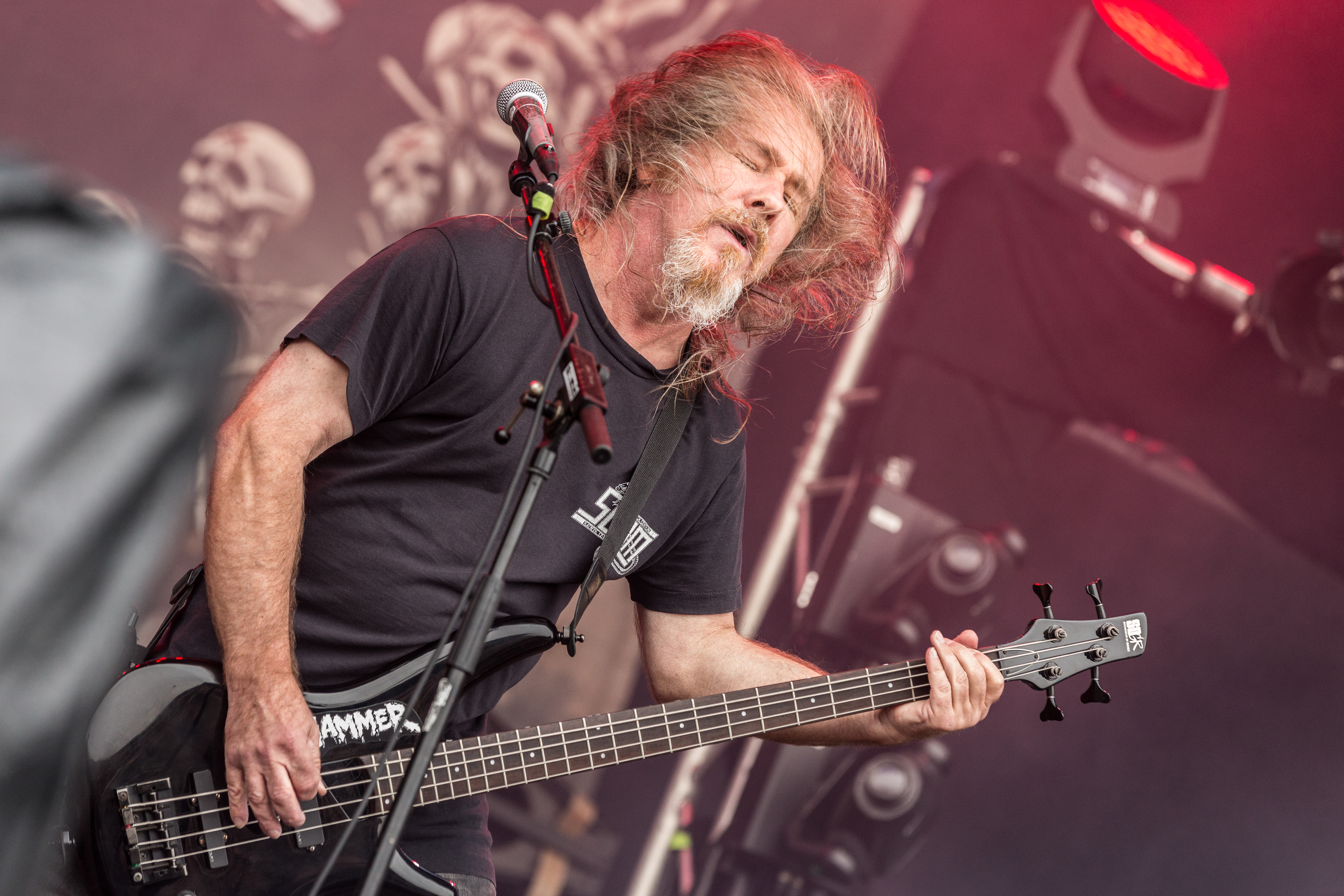
Steve Reynolds, Party.San 2017

In March 2016, the band reunited with new drummer Angel Cotte. They played a show in June 2016 in Brooklyn, New York for which it was sold out under 3 minutes. They also played that year's Maryland Deathfest.

In a January 2017 interview at 70000 Tons of Metal, the members of Demolition Hammer were asked if the band will record a follow-up to 1994's Time Bomb. Bassist and vocalist Steve Reynolds replied, "We've talked. But we were so busy just trying to work all this in, we haven't really solidified any plans for that. But we're still talking about it." Guitarist James Reilly added, "Now that we see how well this is going, we do have it in our heads to start writing some new material and see where it goes."

In March 2024, the band participated in the Hell's Heroes music festival, which took place at White Oak Music Hall in Houston and was headlined by Sodom and Queensrÿche.

== Musical style ==
Demolition Hammer's music is generally considered a fusion of thrash metal and death metal, with Steve Reynolds referring to them as a "brutal deathrash" band. Making use of dual lead guitars and blast beats, the band emerged near the end of thrash metal's popularity, so Reynolds and Sykes decided to go in a different and slower direction, similar to that of Machine Head and Pantera. The change of style towards a groove metal sound heard on Time Bomb, led to the departure of both Daze and Reilly and drew ire from some fans of thrash metal.

In reference to a national tour in 1991, The Pittsburgh Press wrote that Demolition Hammer played "lightning-fast songs with complex structure and shifting rhythms." Keith Bergman referred to Reynolds and Sykes as "riff machines" while also complimenting the band's songwriting ability.

== Members ==
- Steve Reynolds – bass, lead vocals (1986–1995, 2016–present)
- James Reilly – guitars, backing vocals (1986–1993, 2016–present)
- Derek Sykes – guitars, backing vocals (1988–1995, 2016–present)
- Angel Cotte – drums (2016–present)

Former

- John Salerno – drums (1986–1988)
- Vinny Daze – drums, backing vocals (1988–1993; died 1996)
- Mike Usifer – guitars, backing vocals (1992–1995)
- Alex Marquez – drums (1994–1995)

Timeline

== Discography ==
=== Studio albums ===
- Tortured Existence (Century Media, 1990)
- Epidemic of Violence (Century Media, 1992)
- Time Bomb (Century Media, 1994)

=== Compilations ===
- Necrology: A Complete Anthology (Century Media, 2008)

=== Demos ===
- Skull Fracturing Nightmare (1988)
- Necrology (1989)
