= Masks (album) =

Studio album by Eyes Set to Kill
- Released: September 17, 2013
- Genre: Metalcore; post-hardcore; alternative metal; nu metal
- Length: 45:35
- Label: Century Media
- Producer: Steve Evetts, Andrew Wade

Eyes Set to Kill chronology
White Lotus (2011)	Masks (2013)	Eyes Set to Kill (2018)

Singles from Masks
- 1. "Lost and Forgotten" Released: June 26, 2013; 2. "Infected" Released: September 4, 2013

Masks is the fifth studio album by American metalcore band Eyes Set to Kill. The album was released on September 17, 2013. It is their first album to be released under Century Media Records. It is also their last album to feature unclean vocalist and guitarist Cisko Miranda.

== Music and lyrics ==
Phil Freeman of Alternative Press wrote that "Eyes Set to Kill go an overtly metal, even nü-metal direction." In addition, Freeman wrote that "Their riffs are fierce and heavy, laid over powerful grooves, but it's the vocal melodies that pack the most punch."

== Critical reception ==
Professional ratings
Review scores
Source	Rating
Alternative Press	4/5 stars

At Alternative Press, Phil Freeman noted "This is strong work from a band unwilling to be dismissed as a sister-act gimmick."

== Track listing ==
All tracks are written by Eyes Set to Kill and Alexandro Lopez, except where noted

No.	Title	Writer(s)	Producer	Length
1.	"Masks"	Eyes Set to Kill, Alex Lopez	Steve Evetts	1:40
2.	"Killing in Your Name"	Eyes Set to Kill, Lopez	Evetts	3:27
3.	"Lost and Forgotten"	Eyes Set to Kill, Lopez	Evetts	3:52
4.	"Where I Want to Be"	Eyes Set to Kill, Lopez	Andrew Wade	3:11
5.	"True Colors"	Eyes Set to Kill, Lopez	Evetts	4:43
6.	"Surface"	Eyes Set to Kill, Lopez, Brandon Saller, Fred Archambault	Evetts	3:59
7.	"Little Liar"	Eyes Set to Kill, Lopez, Johnny Andrews	Evetts	3:00
8.	"Nothing Left to Say"	Eyes Set to Kill, Lopez	Evetts	3:56
9.	"The New Plague"	Eyes Set to Kill, Lopez	Evetts	3:09
10.	"Infected"	Eyes Set to Kill, Lopez, Kane Churko	Evetts	2:49
11.	"Secrets Between"	Eyes Set to Kill, Lopez	Wade	4:05
12.	"Haze"	Eyes Set to Kill, Lopez, Churko	Evetts	3:25
13.	"The Forbidden Line"	Eyes Set to Kill, Lopez	Evetts	4:05
Total length:				45:35

== Personnel ==
Eyes Set to Kill

- Cisko Miranda - unclean vocals,
- Alexia Rodriguez - clean vocals, lead, rhythm and acoustic guitars, keyboards
- Anissa Rodriguez - bass guitar
- Caleb Clifton - drums, percussion

Artwork and design

- James Lano - artwork, layout
- Jeremy Saffer - photography

Production

- Steve Evetts - producer, engineer, mixing
- Andrew Wade - producer
- Alan Douches - mastering
- Allan Hessler - engineer
- Alex Lopez - composer, drum engineering
- Kane Churko - composer
- Brandon Saller - composer
- Johnny Andrews - composer
- Fred Archambault - composer

== Charts ==
Chart (2013)	Peak position
US Heatseekers Albums (Billboard)	5
US Independent Albums (Billboard)	34
US Top Hard Rock Albums (Billboard)	11
