= Deadguy =

American metalcore band

- Origin: New Brunswick, New Jersey, U.S.
- Genres: Metalcore; mathcore; noise rock
- Years active: 1994–1997; 2021–present
- Labels: Victory; Blackout; Hawthorne Street; Decibel; Relapse
- Members: Chris Corvino; Dave Rosenberg; Tim Singer; Keith Huckins; Jim Baglino
- Past members: Tim Naumann; Tom Yak; Chris Pierce

Deadguy is an American metalcore band from New Brunswick, New Jersey. The band formed in 1994 and disbanded in 1997, subsequently reuniting in 2021 and releasing the critically acclaimed Near-Death Travel Services on June 27, 2025. Deadguy is considered to have played an important role in the development of the mathcore genre. Their debut studio album Fixation on a Co-Worker is cited as a classic within the genre by some. In 2006, Decibel magazine included the album in its "Hall of Fame" list. Deadguy has been cited as an influence by such bands as the Dillinger Escape Plan, Shai Hulud, and Jeromes Dream.

== History ==
Deadguy formed in 1994. The band took their name from a line in the John Candy movie, Only the Lonely. The group issued two 7-inch extended plays that year alone: Work Ethic and White Meat. Although not as widely known as some of their peers, Deadguy has proven to be very influential on modern hardcore and metal as evidenced by their first studio album, Fixation On A Co-Worker being inducted into the Decibel magazine Hall of Fame in July 2006.

The band embarked on a fateful US tour in support of Fixation on a Co-Worker that was plagued by misguided booking and lack of funds. The band splintered during the western leg of the tour as Keith Huckins and Tim Singer left the band and moved to Seattle, Washington to form Kiss It Goodbye. The remaining members (Tim Naumann, Chris Corvino and Dave Rosenberg) then recruited Tom Yak and Jim Baglino (on second guitar and bass respectively). After the lineup changes, Deadguy wrote and recorded Screamin' with the Deadguy Quintet. A US tour with Bloodlet ensued in support of the EP. The tour was gruelling but successful and Tom Yak left the band shortly thereafter, and the rest of Deadguy recruited Doc Hopper member Chris Pierce to replace him. They played their last show in New Brunswick, NJ in 1997. Pierce later ran a recording studio in New Brunswick called Technical Ecstasy which recorded many locally renowned acts such as The Ergs and used his old Deadguy connections to get "Pops" to do guest vocals on their song "Maybe I'm The New Messiah" while recording their benchmark album "Dorkrockcorkrod".

=== 2021 reunion ===
On May 25, 2021, Deadguy announced they would reunite the "Fixation on a Co-worker" lineup and play the 2021 Decibel Metal and Beer Fest. It was their first show in 25 years. This live performance was subsequently released as Buyer's Remorse: Live from the Decibel Magazine Metal & Beer Fest in June 2022 by Decibel Records, as the label's first release.

=== Near-Death Travel Services (2025–present) ===
On April 29, 2025, the band announced their official signing to Relapse Records. They also announced their second studio album, Near-Death Travel Services, which was released on June 27 of the same year.

Deadguy will support Napalm Death on select dates of their 2026 North American tour. The band is also scheduled to perform at Milwaukee Metal Fest in June 2026.

== Musical style and influences ==
Deadguy's musical style consists of "screaming vocals [...] set to discordant guitars," and is characterized by "extremely personal" lyrical content and a "dark and somber approach." Brian Peterson, in the book Burning Fight described their sound as a blend of "metal, the caustic noise rock of groups like Today is the Day and Unsane, the experimental punk of bands like the Cows, and the innovative hardcore of Black Flag." According to Peterson, "They weren't sure how well their sound that combined hardcore, metal, noise, and rock would be received, but ultimately they didn't care – what mattered was that they were making the music they wanted to play."

Deadguy was influenced by a variety of bands, including Black Flag, Black Sabbath, Unsane, Today is the Day, Misfits, Voivod, and Slayer. According to drummer Dave Rosenburg, "basically, we studied a bunch of records we liked by these amazingly heavy bands and added a bit of Black Sabbath and started to make up these parts for songs." According to vocalist Tim Singer, "We were still part of the hardcore scene, but we thought it needed a jolt – it had become formulaic and manufactured. Our music wasn't going to have a predictable mosh part that everyone stands around and waits for. We were listening to different shit and thought we might as well incorporate it into what we wanted to do. I still considered us a hardcore band though, so we worked in the same channels and had the same ethics. We just wanted to try something new."

== Members ==
=== Current members ===
- Chris "Crispy" Corvino – guitars, backing vocals (1994–1997, 2021–present)
- Dave Rosenberg – drums (1994–1997, 2021–present)
- Tim "Swinger" Singer – lead vocals (1994–1996, 2021–present)
- Keith Huckins – guitars (1994–1996, 2021–present)
- Jim Baglino – bass (1996–1997, 2021–present)

=== Former members ===
- Tim "Pops" Naumann – lead vocals (1996–1997), bass (1994–1996)
- Tom Yak – guitars (1996-1997)
- “Big” Chris Pierce – guitars (1997)

== Discography ==
=== Studio albums ===
- Fixation on a Co-Worker (Victory Records, 1995)
- Near-Death Travel Services (Relapse Records, 2025)

=== Live albums ===
- I Know Your Tragedy: Live at CBGBs (Hawthorne Street Records, 2000)
- Buyer's Remorse (Decibel Records, 2022)

=== EPs and singles ===
- White Meat 7" (Dada/Popgun Records, 1994)
- Work Ethic 7" (Engine/Blackout Records, 1994) (CD edition, featuring White Meat tracks, released in 1995)
- Screamin' with the Deadguy Quintet (Victory Records, 1996)
- Body Parts 7" (Man Alive Records, 2022)

=== Other ===
- Driving You Straight To Hell Bootleg (SuperNova Records, 2021)

== Documentary ==
In 2021, a documentary titled Deadguy: Killing Music was released by director William Saunders and producer Nathaniel Shannon of Fourth Media. It is the first authorized documentary on the band's short-lived career and their seminal album, Fixation on a Co-Worker. The feature was an official selection at several film festivals and winner of the 2021 Vesuvius International Film Festival's Documentary Film category. Through the series of interviews and events in the creation of the film, the band members reconnected. The day after the film's premiere at Underground Arts in Philadelphia, PA, the original band members performed together live for the first time in over 20 years. Another 2021 performance, at Saint Vitus in Brooklyn, NY, was recorded and included in the on-demand streaming and blu-ray versions of the film. Shawn Macomber of Decibel describes Deadguy: Killing Music as "Wry and stylish on the surface while reveling in primal vitriol and unorthodox approaches to violence just below" and "one of the best documentaries ever, period, on extreme music, the combustible nature of the youth drawn to create it, and the subsequent better-to-have-a-full-core-nuclear-meltdown-than-fade-away art."
