= The World Outside (Eyes Set to Kill album) =

Studio album by Eyes Set to Kill
- Released: June 2, 2009
- Recorded: 2008
- Length: 37:54
- Labels: BreakSilence, Koch
- Producers: Kelly Dalton, Eric Palmquist, Thomas Flower

Eyes Set to Kill chronology
Reach (2008)	The World Outside (2009)	Broken Frames (2010)

Singles from The World Outside
- 1. "Heights" Released: June 2, 2009; 2. "The World Outside" Released: September 3, 2009; 3. "Deadly Weapons" Released: February 25, 2010

The World Outside is the second full-length album by American rock band Eyes Set to Kill. The album was released on June 2, 2009. The album leaked on May 17. Craig Mabbitt has been confirmed to be a guest vocalist on the song "Deadly Weapons". Alexia Rodriguez stated that this album is "a lot darker."

== Track listing ==
No.	Title	Length
1.	"Heights"	3:25
2.	"Hourglass"	3:26
3.	"Deadly Weapons" (feat. Craig Mabbitt of Escape The Fate)	3:35
4.	"Interlude"	0:59
5.	"The World Outside"	3:46
6.	"March of the Dead"	4:19
7.	"Wake Me Up"	4:07
8.	"The Hollow Pt. 1"	0:55
9.	"The Hollow"	3:19
10.	"Risen"	2:48
11.	"Her Eyes Hold the Apocalypse"	3:00
12.	"Come Home"	4:15
Total length:		37:54

=== Singles ===
"Heights" is the lead single of the album, and was released June 2, 2009. The music video was posted on May 27, 2009. The music video was directed by Black Fawn Films' Chad Archibald in Los Angeles.

"The World Outside" is the second single of the album. It was released September 3, 2009. The band posted the video in their MySpace's Profile and YouTube Channel. The zombies of music video are 28 Weeks Later inspired.

"Deadly Weapons" is the third single released from the album. The music video is a sequel from the previous single where Craig Mabbitt was bitten by the zombies and killed all of the band members. Anderson is not present in the video.

== Critical reception ==
Professional ratings
Review scores
Source	Rating
Blabbermouth.net	3.5/10 stars
Sputnikmusic	3.5/5 stars
AllMusic	3.5/5 stars

The album has gained some positive reviews from the critics. Trey Spencer of Sputnikmusic summarized that Eyes Set to Kill still have some growing to do, but this album is proof that they are up to the challenge. Alex Henderson of Allmusic stated Eyes Set to Kill's take on the "Beauty and the Beast" concept works enjoyably well for them on The World Outside.

A negative review is given by Blabbermouth's Scott Alisoglu commenting there are worse albums than "The Outside World". I just hear very little in the way of pop melodies that grab or aggressive moments that get the adrenaline pumping. The infusion of keyboards and the attempt at dynamic vocal structuring doesn't save it either. There is an audience for this album; I'm just not part of it. Pass.

== Chart performance ==
The album sold 2,400 copies in the United States in its first week of release, according to Nielsen SoundScan. The album peaked at #9 on the Billboard Heatseekers chart and #26 on the Independent Albums chart

=== Charts ===
Chart (2009)	Peak position
Top Heatseekers	9
Independent Albums	26

== Personnel ==
Band

- Brandon Anderson - unclean vocals, keyboards, synthesizers, programming
- Alexia Rodriguez - clean vocals, lead guitar, acoustics guitars, piano
- Greg Kerwin - rhythm guitar
- Anissa Rodriguez - bass guitar
- Caleb Clifton - drums, percussion, samples

Additional personnel

- Tom Breyfogle - additional programming
- Lukas Vesely - additional keyboards
- Craig Mabbitt - vocals on "Deadly Weapons"

Production

- Kelly Dalton - producer
- Eric Palmquist - producer
- Thomas Flower - audio production, engineer, mixing, producer
- Jason Livermore - mastering
- Ian MacGregor - assistant engineer
- Casey Quintal - art direction, design
- Nathan Taylor - photography
- Kevin Zinger - executive producer
