= Jersey's Best Dancers =

Studio album by Lifetime
- Released: June 10, 1997
- Recorded: June 1996, January 1997
- Studio: Trax East
- Genre: Melodic hardcore; hardcore punk; punk rock; pop-punk
- Length: 23:11
- Label: Jade Tree

Lifetime chronology
Hello Bastards (1995)	Jersey's Best Dancers (1997)	Somewhere in the Swamps of Jersey (2006)

Jersey's Best Dancers is the third studio album by American punk rock band Lifetime. It was released on June 10, 1997, through Jade Tree Records.

== Background and production ==
With the release of their second studio album Hello Bastards in September 1995, Lifetime solidified their line-up as Ari Katz on vocals, Dan Yemin and Pete Martin on guitar, Dave Palaitis on bass, and Scott Golley on drums. The album, which earned the band a dedicated following, was promoted with tours of the United States and European territories. By early 1996, Lifetime began writing material for their next album.

In June 1996, the band recorded an album at Trax East in South River, New Jersey, with Steve Evetts. In spite of nearly finishing the sessions, Lifetime felt some of the tracks needed further refinement. "The Boy's No Good" was released as a single in August 1996, with "Somewhere in the Swamps of Jersey" as the B-side, to build hype for their next album. The band toured the US and Europe again over the course of the next few months. After returning home, the band returned to the studio, where they completed recording Jersey's Best Dancers in January 1997.

== Composition and lyrics ==
Musically, the sound of Jersey's Best Dancers has been described as melodic hardcore, hardcore punk, punk rock, and pop-punk. Bart Niedzialkowski of Punk Planet said Lifetime's "formula was simple: hard, fast and aggressive punk rock touched up with a healthy dose of melody". He said the lyrics tackled "deeply personal and emotional tinges" that made for a "raw and searing combination of uncompromising hardcore punk and smart, introspective writing". The album's opening track, "Turnpike Gates", starts with fast-tempo guitarwork and drum parts, before giving way to Katz's lyrics on lost love. The title of "Young, Loud, and Scotty" cribs its name from a Dead Boys release; an alternative version of the track was previously released on the compilation Punk Uprisings Vol. 2 (1997).

"Francie Nolan" opens with guitar chords that ring out, before pausing on one measure, and then shifting into a fast tempo. The mid-tempo "25 Cent Giraffes" is followed by the ballad-like "Hey Catrine", and the hardcore punk song "Bringin' It Backwards"; an alternative version of the latter was previously released on the compilation The Tie That Binds (1996). In "How We Are", Katz tackles complaints against the band, and is followed by the slower-paced "Theme Song for a New Brunswick Basement Show". The latter sees Katz talking about standing next to a girl at a basement, pondering on whether she would break his heart; an alternative version of the track was previously released on the compilation Anti-Matter (1996). The closing track, "The Verona Kings", also deals with criticism towards Lifetime.

== Release and reception ==
Professional ratings
Review scores
Source	Rating
AbsolutePunk	91%
AllMusic	4/5 stars
Ox-Fanzine	Favorable
Pitchfork	8.5/10
Spectrum Culture	Favorable

As recording concluded in early 1997, the band went on a handful of US west coast shows, before breaking up. Katz explained that he was "burnt out, having been on tour in bands since I was 16. [...] I had zero self-esteem and thought I should just be home and figure out how to get a job." Jersey's Best Dancers was released on June 10, 1997, through the record label Jade Tree. In a retrospective piece for Punknews.org, writer Mike Musilli said that the album aided in the maturation of hardcore punk in 1997, with the "diversity of the record’s tracks [having] laid the groundwork for this sonic progression in the hardcore underground."

Jersey's Best Dancers received largely positive reviews. AbsolutePunk staff writer Chris Collum noted that while the instrumentation was "particularly spectacular or technically difficult," it was "nearly peerless" for Lifetime. He wrote that Katz's voice was "delivered in a very raw and amateur way," done in manner that is "fitting with the musical style." AllMusic reviewer Peter J. D'Angelo declared that Jersey's Best Dancers was a "triumphant burst of upbeat punk rock that makes it clear the band called it quits while they were still at the top of their game." Pitchfork contributor Kevin Ruggeri wrote that Jersey's Best Dancers "portrays Lifetime at the height of their craft; a fitting swan song for a band that's been in a constant stage of evolution and progression since its inception."

Punk Planet writer Dan Sinker called it their best effort as Katz's "spot-on melodies contrast beautifully with the driving beats". Joachim Hiller of Ox-Fanzine wrote that "[a]dmittedly, the line of melancholic-melodic punk / hardcore is now pretty exhausted, but here, [... Lifetime] manage to combine the carefree and exuberant, [...] with rather sedate rock grooves [and s]eason it all with a pinch of emo bliss." Spectrum Culture's Nick Gregorio said the band "had perfected their sound" with Jersey's Best Dancers, finding a "balance between melody and intricacy, crafting chord progressions that were atypical, innovative and hellacious fun".

It has appeared on various best-of pop-punk album lists, being named to lists by Kerrang!, Rock Sound, and Rolling Stone. Eddie Cepeda of Vice Media cited the album's influence on future pop-punk and emo acts, such as Fall Out Boy, Panic! at the Disco, and Taking Back Sunday. Three of the songs on the album have been covered by other artists: "Turnpike Gates" by Fall Out Boy, "Cut the Tension" by New Found Glory on their EP Tip of the Iceberg (2008), and "The Boy's No Good" by Rise Against on their compilation album Long Forgotten Songs (2013).

== Track listing ==
1. "Turnpike Gates" – 2:20
2. "Young, Loud, and Scotty" – 1:59
3. "Francie Nolan" – 2:08
4. "25 Cent Giraffes" – 2:20
5. "Hey Catrine" – 2:13
6. "Bringin' It Backwards" – 1:32
7. "How We Are" – 1:27
8. "Theme Song for a New Brunswick Basement Show" – 2:04
9. "Cut the Tension" – 1:55
10. "The Truth About Lars" – 1:53
11. "The Boy's No Good" – 1:12
12. "The Verona Kings" – 2:08
