= Kid Dynamite (album) =

Studio album by Kid Dynamite
- Released: October 27, 1998
- Recorded: September 1998 at Trax East in South River, NJ
- Genre: Hardcore punk, melodic hardcore
- Length: 27:06
- Label: Jade Tree
- Producer: Steve Evetts

Kid Dynamite chronology
Kid Dynamite (1998)	Shorter, Faster, Louder (2000)

Professional ratings
Review scores
Source	Rating
Allmusic	3/5 stars

Kid Dynamite is the first album by Philadelphia hardcore punk band Kid Dynamite. It was released in 1998 by Jade Tree Records.

== Track listing ==
1. "Pause" – 1:14
2. "K05-0564" – 1:50
3. "Sweet Shop Syndicate" – 0:19
4. "Table 19" – 1:49
5. "Ph. Decontrol" – 0:46
6. "Showoff" – 1:14
7. "Bookworm" – 1:59
8. "Scarysmurf" – 0:22
9. "The Ronald Miller Story" – 1:05
10. "Bench Warmer" – 1:33
11. "Zuko's Back in Town" – 1:17
12. "Never Met the Gooch" – 2:00
13. "News at 11" – 1:14
14. "32 Frames per Second" – 0:19
15. "Pacifier" – 2:05
16. "3 O'Clock" – 2:20
17. "Shiner" – 2:13
18. "Wrist Rocket" – 1:36
19. "Fuckuturn" – 1:51

== Credits ==
- Jason Shevchuk – vocals
- Dr. Dan Yemin – guitar
- Steve Farrell – bass
- Dave Wagenschutz – drums
