= ...And Don't Forget to Breathe =

Album by A Static Lullaby

Studio album by A Static Lullaby
- Released: January 28, 2003
- Recorded: Water Music, Hoboken, New Jersey; Technical Extacy, New Brunswick, New Jersey
- Genres: Post-hardcore; emo
- Length: 40:28
- Label: Ferret
- Producer: Steve Evetts

A Static Lullaby chronology
Withered (2002)	...And Don't Forget to Breathe (2003)	Faso Latido (2005)

Singles from ...And Don't Forget to Breathe
- 1. "The Shooting Star That Destroyed Us" Released: 2003; 2. "Lipgloss and Letdown" Released: January 27, 2004

Professional ratings
Review scores
Source	Rating
Allmusic	3/5 stars
Lambgoat	5/10
Punk News	3/5 stars

...And Don't Forget to Breathe is the debut album by the post-hardcore band A Static Lullaby. On the original release, the title was misspelled as '...And Don't Forget to Breath'. This was corrected in a re-release.

Music videos were made for the songs "Lipgloss and Letdown" and "The Shooting Star That Destroyed Us."

== Background ==
"Love to Hate, Hate to Me" (under the title "Love to Hate, Hate to Love"), "The Shooting Star That Destroyed Us", "A Sip of Wine Chased With Cyanide" and "Charred Fields of Snow" were first released on the band's self-titled debut EP.

The songs "Withered", "Lipgloss and Letdown" and "Song for a Broken Heart" originally appeared on the band's 2002 demo Withered and were re-recorded for this album.

== Music ==
The album's sound has drawn comparisons to Thursday, albeit with "much more brutal vocals," according to Alternative Press, which categorized it as post-hardcore and scene music.

== Reception ==
Allmusic reviewer Kurt Morris gave the album a mixed to favorable review, comparing the band to the likes of Thursday. He complemented the vocal work and the melodies. Morris singled out "A Sip of Wine Chased with Cyanide" calling it the best track on the album, mainly for its guitar work. Morris concluded his review by saying the album will grow on the listener with each additional listen.

A Punknews.org staff reviewer also gave the album a mixed to favorable review. He compared the band to Glassjaw and Drive-Thru Records artists. He stated the music was "good, just derivative as hell". The reviewer said the song "A Sip of Wine Chased with Cyanide" came across as a rip-off of At the Drive-In's "One Armed Scissor".

== Track listing ==
All lyrics written by Dan Arnold, all music composed by A Static Lullaby

No.	Title	Length
1.	"Nightmares Win 6-0"	2:43
2.	"Love to Hate, Hate to Me"	3:42
3.	"Withered"	3:59
4.	"Lipgloss and Letdown"	4:13
5.	"A Sip of Wine Chased with Cyanide"	5:14
6.	"We Go to Eleven"	4:22
7.	"The Shooting Star That Destroyed Us"	4:36
8.	"A Song for a Broken Heart"	4:01
9.	"Annunciate While You Masticate"	2:52
10.	"Charred Fields of Snow"	4:50
Total length:		40:28

== Personnel ==
Personnel per booklet.

Band

- Joe Brown – unclean vocals
- Dan Arnold – clean vocals, rhythm guitar, piano, programming
- Nate Lindeman – lead guitar
- Phil Pirrone – bass, clean vocals
- Brett Dinovo – drums, percussion

Production

- Steve Evetts – production
- Jesse Cannon – editing, engineer assistant
- Peter Lewit – legal
- Rodney Afshari – management
- Jessica Lastowski – photography
