= Lifetime (band) =

American melodic hardcore band

- Origin: New Brunswick, New Jersey, U.S.
- Genres: Melodic hardcore; emo
- Years active: 1990–1997, 2005–present
- Labels: Jade Tree, Decaydance, No Idea
- Members: Ari Katz; Dan Yemin; Pete Martin; Dave Palaitis; Scott Golley
- Past members: Chris Corvino; Chris Daly; Justin Janisch; Linda Kay; David Wagenshutz; Scott Saint Hilaire

Lifetime is an American melodic hardcore/emo band from New Brunswick, New Jersey. It was formed in 1990 and disbanded in 1997. In late 2005, they announced their reunion.

== History ==
The band was formed in 1990 by singer Ari Katz (ex-Enuf) and guitarist Dan Yemin with its roots in the New York/New Jersey hardcore scene. They are known to have met and lived in New Brunswick, New Jersey during this time. In contrast to the negative, sometimes violent tone promulgated by their New York hardcore contemporaries, lyricist Katz emphasized more positive, personal themes in their two-minute songs. In 1993, Lifetime released their first full-length album, titled Background, that bore only passing resemblance to their later, more melodic work. By 1995, the band achieved some form of stability with the addition of Pete Martin (guitar), David Palaitis (bass), and Scott Golley (drums). That same year, they released their second album, Hello Bastards on Jade Tree Records. Hello Bastards marked a slight shift in direction, incorporating more melodic punk leanings over a driving hardcore tempo. Ari Katz's lyrics, though sometimes undecipherable, dealt mainly with more introspective and personal themes such as relationships and youthful disaffection. Hello Bastards also includes a cover of "It's Not Funny Anymore" by the seminal 1980s alternative rock band Hüsker Dü, hinting at the band's musical influences.

In 1996, Lifetime issued a compilation of their 7" releases and unreleased songs, on Glue Records, also released in Europe by Day After Records. In 1997, the band completed its third full-length Jersey's Best Dancers. With twelve songs clocking in at under 24 minutes, Jersey's Best Dancers continued in the same vein as Hello Bastards. However, after a short tour in support of their new album, Lifetime decided to disband in 1997.

After disbanding, Dan Yemin went on to become a member of two other punk bands, the short-lived Kid Dynamite and Paint It Black. Dave Palaitis, Ari Katz, and his wife Tannis Kristjanson went on to form the now defunct Zero Zero. They now play in Miss TK and the Revenge. Golley joined Detournement alongside members of Bigwig, Plan A, Ensign and Worthless United.

=== Reunion ===
In 2005 the band got together for a series of three well-received and long-awaited reunion shows over the weekend of August 19 to 21, 2005. The shows were a result of the cancellation of Hellfest, in which Lifetime was scheduled to play on August 20. Two shows took place in Philadelphia, August 19 at The Trocadero Theatre featured the reunion of hardcore band 108, August 20 at the Starlight Ballroom, and The final reunion show was held at The Stone Pony in Asbury Park, New Jersey, which featured opening bands The Loved Ones and The Bouncing Souls. Some profits from the show went to charities such as New Labor, The OUT Fund, the Nature Conservancy, and Linda Ann's Greyhound Rescue Inc.

Lifetime went on to play three more reunion shows in California over a weekend in January. The shows were at the Troubadour in Los Angeles on January 27, at the Chain Reaction in Anaheim on January 28, and at Slims in San Francisco on January 29.

November 17, 2005, brought the announcement from the band that they are officially reforming. The band posted the following statement on PunkNews.org:

"As some of you may know, Lifetime got back together to play HellFest this past August, after being given the opportunity (by the Fest's organizers) to raise a large amount of money for the charities of our choice. We were readying ourselves for what could have been a pretty alienating experience, playing the Enormo-Dome in front of 8000 metal-core dudes, when much to everyone's surprise, the Fest got canceled at the last minute.

With the help of Margie Alban at Do It Booking and a host of other hardworking friends, we were able to scrape together 3 days of amazing and much more intimate shows. That weekend in August turned out to be a seriously transforming experience for this bunch of aging and sometimes cynical punks. Thanks to all the old friends and new kids who came out to sing along, I think the five of us felt transported back to a time when our lives were first changed by music.

To make an already long story shorter, we have decided to play together again, not as the resurrected corpse of a one-off reunion show, but as a group of guys who love making music together. We will remain committed to our families and our other musical endeavors, so we're unsure of how often you'll hear from us, but you can expect more shows and more music in the coming year. We will be playing some shows in California at the end of January 2006, in L.A. and San Francisco. Thanks for your support."

The band played another reunion show at the 2006 South by Southwest Festival in Austin, Texas on March 17, 2006. The show was free and donations went to breast cancer research by Shirts for a Cure.

In late March 2006, Lifetime signed onto Decaydance, Pete Wentz's imprint of Fueled by Ramen Records, with the statement: "Pete and Decaydance are giving us an opportunity to the make the record we want to make while still staying in control of our music and our lives. They are behind us as artists and because of that, we're backing them as a label." Shortly after, Lifetime began writing and recording their fourth full-length album, titled Lifetime, which was released by Decaydance on February 6, 2007. In January 2009, the band parted ways with Fueled by Ramen. The band has since left the label and are now "free agents". The band is Managed by veteran Artist Manager Mike Mowery of Outerloop Management in Washington, DC. In August 2009, the band supported the Bouncing Souls for two shows.

== Musical style and legacy ==
Critics have categorized Lifetime's music as melodic hardcore, emo and emo pop punk.

On the subject of Lifetime's various musical influences, guitarist Dan Yemin has stated:

We were just five punk rock kids that were in love with music, and really just in love with a wide scale of sophisticated music, and not just like hardcore. (...) We were as much into Elvis Costello and Billy Bragg as we were into Minor Threat and Black Flag. We were as into the Psychedelic Furs as we were into Youth of Today. I was as much guitar-wise influenced by R.E.M., the Cure, and Alex Lifeson of Rush as I was by Brian Baker of Dag Nasty and Pete Chramiec of Verbal Assault. I mean we were just trying to make music that was grounded in everything we loved, and we weren't trying to pretend to be anything.

Other influences Lifetime have cited as an influence include Leatherface, Rites of Spring, Embrace, Pinhead Gunpowder, Squirrel Bait, Turning Point, Gorilla Biscuits, 7 Seconds and Descendents.

They have been cited as an influence by Silverstein, Grade, My Chemical Romance, Thursday, the Bouncing Souls, Saves the Day, Taking Back Sunday, Midtown, Stretch Arm Strong and Senses Fail.

== Members ==
=== Current ===
- Ari Katz – vocals
- Dan Yemin – guitar
- Pete Martin – guitar
- Dave Palaitis – bass
- Scott Golley – drums

=== Former ===
- Chris Corvino – bass
- Justin Janisch – bass
- Linda Kay – bass
- Chris Daly – drums
- David Wagenshutz – drums
- Scott Saint Hilaire – guitar

== Discography ==
Studio albums

- Background (1993)
- Hello Bastards (1995)
- Jersey's Best Dancers (1997)
- Lifetime (2007)
