= Hello Bastards =

Studio album by Lifetime
- Released: September 25, 1995
- Recorded: May and June 1995 at Trax East Studio, New Jersey
- Genres: Punk rock; pop-punk; hardcore punk; melodic hardcore; emo
- Length: 21:37
- Label: Jade Tree

Lifetime chronology
Background (1993)	Hello Bastards (1995)	Jersey's Best Dancers (1997)

Hello Bastards is the second full-length album by American punk rock band Lifetime. It was recorded at Trax East Studio in South River, New Jersey during May and June 1995 and was released by Jade Tree Records on September 25, 1995. On February 20, 2010, No Idea Records re-released the album on 12" color vinyl.

== Musical style ==
The album has been described musically as punk rock, melodic hardcore, hardcore punk, emo, and pop-punk.

== Artwork ==
The album cover is a homage to the Housemartins' London 0 Hull 4 (1986).

== Critical reception ==
Professional ratings
Review scores
Source	Rating
AllMusic	4.5/5 stars
Punknews.org	4.5/5 stars
Wondering Sound	Favorable

Journalists Leslie Simon and Trevor Kelley included the album in their list of the most essential emo releases in their book Everybody Hurts: An Essential Guide to Emo Culture (2007). "(The Gym Is) Neutral Territory" appeared at number 52 on a best-of emo songs list by Vulture.

== Track listing ==
1. "Daneurysm" – 1:12
2. "Rodeo Clown" – 2:03
3. "Anchor" – 2:23
4. "I'm Not Calling You" – 2:31
5. "Bobby Truck Tricks" – 2:26
6. "(The Gym Is) Neutral Territory" – 2:20
7. "I Like You OK" – 0:49
8. "It's Not Funny Anymore" (Hüsker Dü cover) – 2:03
9. "Irony Is for Suckers" – 1:44
10. "What She Said" – 1:04
11. "Knives, Bats, New Tats" – 1:57
12. "Ostrichsized" – 2:25

== Limited colored vinyl editions ==
=== Jade Tree Records ===
- 550 copies on white vinyl
- 500 copies on purple vinyl

=== No Idea Records ===
==== February 20, 2010 ====
- 500 mysterious int
- 500 gruesome green
- 500 blank stare white

== Personnel ==
=== Lifetime ===
- Ari Katz – vocals
- Dan Yemin – guitar
- Pete Martin – guitar
- Dave Palaitis – bass guitar
- Scott Golley – drums

=== Production ===
- Steve Evetts – production, engineering, mixing
- Michael Sarsfield – mastering
- John Yates – graphics
- Tim Owen – photography
