= Kid Dynamite (band) =

American hardcore punk band

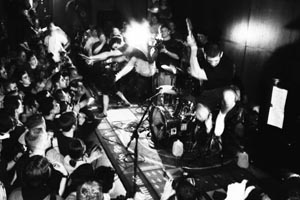
- Kid Dynamite live

Background information
- Origin: Philadelphia, Pennsylvania, U.S.
- Genres: Hardcore punk, melodic hardcore
- Years active: 1997–2000, 2003, 2005, 2010–2013
- Labels: Jade Tree; Sub City; I Stand Alone
- Past members: Michael "Spider" Cotterman; Steve Ferrell; Jason Shevchuk; Dave Wagenschutz; Dan Yemin

Kid Dynamite was an American hardcore punk band from Philadelphia, Pennsylvania. They formed in 1997 and broke up in 2000, while reuniting sporadically since then until 2013. They were signed to Jade Tree Records.

== History ==
=== 20th century ===
Kid Dynamite was formed in 1997 by drummer Dave Wagenschutz and guitarist Dan Yemin, who had both played in the influential New Jersey band Lifetime. After their dissolution, Yemin expressed interest in forming a new band. He called friend Steve Ferrell to fill the role as the bassist and Wagenschutz on drums, rounding out the rhythm section. They then went into the studio to record the music for what would become their first demo. After trying out multiple singers, they settled on Jason Shevchuk, who previously sang for straight edge band Bound. With this lineup intact, Jason added vocals over the music the band previously recorded, naming the demo 'Six Songs With Jay Singing'. They played their first show on April 22, 1998, in Philadelphia, opening for Better Than a Thousand. From there, the band played shows up and down the East Coast of the United States throughout the summer of that year.

In the fall of 1998, they entered the studio to record their first full-length album with Steve Evetts, who had previously worked with Lifetime on their albums Hello Bastards and Jersey's Best Dancers. Kid Dynamite released their self-titled debut on October 27, 1998, through Jade Tree to immediate popularity. After the album's release, the band continued to gig throughout the winter of 1998. In 1999, bassist Steve Ferrell departed the band on good terms and was temporarily replaced by Ernie Parada of GreyArea. The bassist position was then permanently filled by Michael 'Spider' Cotterman. In the summer of 1999, the band embarked on their first cross-country tour opening for Good Riddance, alongside Boston's In My Eyes. From there, they spent the rest of the year on the road with other bands including Kill Your Idols, Snapcase, and Buried Alive. In between that, they went back into the studio to record what would be their last album Shorter, Faster, Louder. After the album's completion, Shevchuk left in December 1999 to finish film school. Though it was rumoured that Jesse Standhard of Right Brigade had taken over as the lead singer, it was ultimately proven false.

=== 21st century ===
Shorter, Faster, Louder was released on February 15, 2000. Kid Dynamite did two final shows on February 18 and 19, 2000 at the First Unitarian Church in Philadelphia, Pennsylvania.

In April 2003, the band played three reunion shows as benefits for the Syrentha J. Savio Endowment, to help early breast cancer detection. The three shows raised over $20,000 total towards the endowment. In September 2003, the band's label Jade Tree put out a compilation of rare and live material titled Cheap Shots, Youth Anthems, which featured a teaser DVD for a forthcoming live DVD that will include footage from the band's 2003 reunion shows for the Syrentha Savio Endowment charity.

In 2005, the band played a reunion show as a benefit for New York City's historic CBGB venue on August 22, 2005. The opening bands were Take My Chances (ex-The Backup Plan), Voice in the Wire, and GreyArea. Ernie Parada joined the band onstage for their cover of 'Birthdays' by Token Entry, who he played drums for in the 1980s. The band jokingly came up with a new "song" during the soundcheck called "Whoa Dave Can You Hear Me"; in which they tested out their equipment to see if everything was set up properly while Jason Shevchuk screamed "Whoa Dave can you hear me" over and over.

On February 21, 2006, Jade Tree released the DVD Four Years In One Gulp, a DVD documentary on the band. It features commentary about Kid Dynamite from members of the band and several friends regarding the bands history, with narration by Jason Shevchuk. It also included 25 live performances throughout the band's lifetime. Carry the Torch: A Tribute to Kid Dynamite was released by Get Outta Town Records in 2009. The album contains covers of every song the band recorded interpreted by other punk and hardcore adjacent bands.

The band has performed other reunion shows at "This Is Hardcore" fest in 2010, and "Fuck Yeah Fest" in Los Angeles, on September 3, 2011, The Fest 10 in Gainesville, Florida, and FunFunFunFest 2011 in Austin, Texas.

In 2013, the band officially announced they were breaking up. They played their last shows at This Is Hardcore Fest in Philadelphia and in New York with Swearin’ and Joyce Manor.

== Discography ==
Studio albums

Title	Details
Kid Dynamite	Released: October 27, 1998; Label: Jade Tree (JT1039); Format: CD, DL, LP
Shorter, Faster, Louder	Released: February 15, 2000; Label: Jade Tree (JT1045); Format: CD, DL, LP

Compilation albums

Title	Details
Cheap Shots, Youth Anthems	Released: 2003; Label: Jade Tree (JT1085); Format: CD+DVD-V, DL, LP
This Is Hardcore (combines the first two albums)	Released: August 15, 2010; Label: Jade Tree (JT1039/JT1045); Format: LP

Video albums

Title	Details
Four Years in One Gulp	Released: February 21, 2006; Label: Jade Tree (JT1108); Format: DVD-V

Extended plays

Title	Details
Six Songs with Jay Singing	Released: 1998; Label: Self-released; Format: CS
88 Fingers Louie / Kid Dynamite (split with 88 Fingers Louie)	Released: 1999; Label: Sub City (SC004); Format: CD, 10" vinyl
I Stand Alone (split with Elliott and Sunday Evening Dinner Club)	Released: 1999; Label: I Stand Alone (ISA #05); Format: 7" vinyl
