= Casket Salesmen =

American progressive rock band

- Origin: Corona, California
- Genres: Progressive rock, post-hardcore
- Years active: 2006–2010
- Label: Longhair Illuminati
- Members: Phil Pirrone; Nathan Lindeman; Ryan Knights
- Website: Official website

Casket Salesmen was an experimental progressive-rock band from Corona, California, that was active from 2006 to 2010.

== History ==
Casket Salesmen formed after bassist Phil Pirrone suffered a horrific car accident and, following a lengthy recovery, decided to abandon his post in the band A Static Lullaby. The band was formed in 2005 by Phil Pirrone and Nathan Lindeman, after leaving their former band A Static Lullaby to pursue a different musical direction. Pirrone had started A Static Lullaby in 2001 with Joe Brown and Dan Arnold when he was 16 years old. The band members played in several bands at Ayala High School.

Their first album, Sleeping Giants, was engineered by Justin Gutierrez. Casket Salesmen produced the record themselves at their house in Corona, CA, which also served as the headquarters for Justin's Solunaris Studios and Phil's record label, Longhair Illuminati. The album feature Nathan Lindeman on guitars, programming, and some bass, Phil Pirrone on bass, vocals and some guitar, and Ryan Knights on drums, percussion, as well as programming in a track he wrote, "Forked Tongues". Sleeping Giants was released on October 31, 2006 on Longhair Illuminati Recordings. The standout songs on Sleeping Giants were "I'll Buy That for a Dollar" and "Dr. Jesus".

The band played over 200 shows and shared the stage with bands including RX Bandits, The Lemonheads, Dredg, No Age, Earthless, Jubilee, the Germs, Apex Theory, Von Bondies, Grand Ole Party, Against Me!, Circa Survive and New Model Army.

In 2009 Casket Salesmen were working on new material after nearly a year in hibernation. During that hibernation, Pirrone started a band called Välmart. The band went on hiatus in 2010, and has not performed since.

== Members ==
The live band lineup saw frequent changes, and also included members of Auditory Aphasia & Mythmaker. The following people all played with the band at one point:

- Phil Pirrone - Guitar, Vocals, Bass
- Nathan Lindeman - Guitar
- Ryan Knights - Drums
- David Fujinami - Bass, Guitar
- JJ Gumiran - Guitar, Keys, Bass
- Anthony Alagna - Keys, Percussion, Programming
- Christopher Walvoord - Drums
- Justin Gutierrez - Bass, Engineer
- Nicole Verhamme - Bass, Guitar, Vocals

== Discography ==
- Dr Jesus EP (Longhair Illuminati Recordings, Release date: Sep 12, 2006)
- Sleeping Giants (Longhair Illuminati Recordings, Release date: Oct 31, 2006)
