= Eyes Set to Kill =

American metalcore band

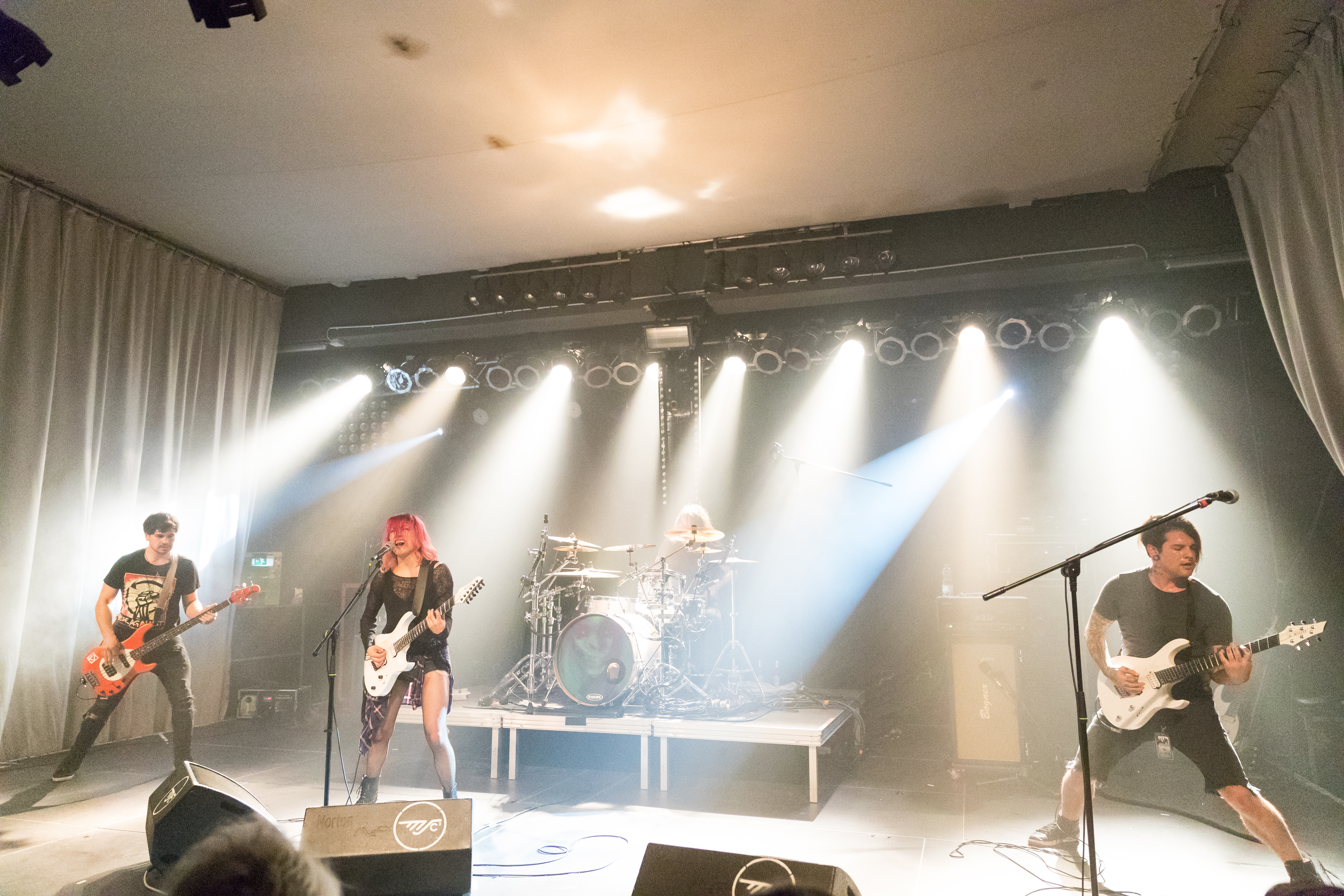
- Eyes Set to Kill performing in 2018

Background information
- Origin: Tempe, Arizona, U.S.
- Genres: Metalcore; post-hardcore; alternative metal; screamo
- Years active: 2003–present
- Labels: Revival Recordings; Century Media; Maphia; Foresee; Suburban Noize; BreakSilence Recordings; Koch
- Members: Alexia Rodriguez; Anissa Rodriguez; Caleb Clifton; Jeremy Anderson
- Past members: Spencer Merrill; David Phipps; Austin Vanderbur; Zack Hansen; John Moody; Milad Sadegi; Lindsey Vogt; Alex Torres; Brandon Anderson; Justin Denson; Greg Kerwin; Cisko Miranda; AJ Bartholomew; Tiaday Xavier Ball
- Website: Facebook.com/eyessettokill

Eyes Set to Kill is an American metalcore band from Tempe, Arizona. The Rodriguez sisters, lead guitarist Alexia and bassist Anissa, along with vocalist Lindsey Vogt started the band in 2003. After Lindsey's departure, Alexia assumed her position as lead vocalist as well as guitarist. Anissa left in late 2016 but returned to the band in 2023.

The World Outside received widespread critical acclaim and the group was featured on the cover of USA Today, as one of Alternative Press Magazine's "100 Bands You Need To Know", and hosted an episode of MTV's Headbangers Ball. Broken Frames was ranked fifth on the list of "Locals Only: The Best Albums and EPs in 2010". Emanie:12/10/2023

== History ==
Eyes Set to Kill began in 2003 as a three-piece band from Tempe, Arizona. Alexia Rodriguez (lead guitar, backing vocals), Anissa Rodriguez (bass), and Lindsey Vogt (lead vocals); their name derived from a line out of a poem Alexia wrote in secondary school. Over the next several months, the band continued to undergo changes in their lineup. In early 2006 Alex Torres (rhythm guitar), Corey Pattakos (backing vocals), and Caleb Clifton (drums) joined and recorded a nine-song EP, When Silence Is Broken, the Night Is Torn, at Larry Elyea's Glendale, Arizona home studio: Mind's Eye Digital Recording Studios. The EP featured guitarist Alex Torres and original vocalist, Lindsey Vogt and sold 11,000 units. Their debut full-length album, Reach, was released February 19, 2008, peaking at No. 29 on the Billboard Heatseekers chart and No. 77 on Billboard's Independent Music charts in 2008 selling 1,900 copies in its first week. The first single from the album was "Reach", with their following single as "Darling".

Their second album, The World Outside, was released June 2, 2009. It sold 2,400 copies in the U.S. in its first week of release, according to Nielsen SoundScan. and peaked at No. 9 on the Billboard Heatseekers chart and No. 26 on the Independent Albums chart

Their third studio album, Broken Frames, was released on June 8, 2010. Its first single, "All You Ever Knew", was released on April 1, 2010, on revolvermag.com and on their MySpace page. Brandon Anderson resigned from the band in early July.

On October 12, 2010, Alexia released her debut solo album, Underground Sounds as Lexia. On October 26, 2010, "Let Me In", which as released as a bonus track on Broken Frames, was released as its first single with a video. Greg Kerwin left the band in early 2011.

On June 7, 2011, the band announced they started their own record label, Foresee Records, and would no longer be with Breaksilence Records. They released White Lotus through a joint venture between their own label Foresee Records and Maphia Entertainment on August 9, 2011. They embarked on a tour with Falling in Reverse and For All Those Sleeping throughout September and October 2011.

On July 19, 2012, they announced signing to Century Media Records. On December 20, 2012, they reached 1,000,000 likes on Facebook prompting them to release a free download of a new demo for their upcoming album. To promote their upcoming album the band released a video for the song "Infected" on September 5, 2013. Masks was released September 17, 2013.

On July 10, they announced that they were forced to cancel an Oklahoma City show due a health issue with Anissa Rodriguez. In September 2015, they were support for New Years Day on their "Other Side Tour" North American Tour.

In March 2016 the band announced a co-headliner tour named "The Visions Tour" with Texas-based band One-Eyed Doll and Open Your Eyes as support. To promote the tour, Eyes Set to Kill and One-Eyed Doll recorded a cover of Depeche Mode's "Enjoy the Silence".

The band released, "Break", in advance of their sixth album on March 24, 2017, via Spotify and on February 1, 2018, "Not Sorry". On February 16, 2018, they released their self-titled album via Century Media Records.

In 2017, Alexia Rodriguez formed band The Secret Destroyers with former vocalist Lindsey Vogt and Teresa Brenneman.

On February 18, 2021, Eyes Set To Kill premiered new single "Find Our Way" via SiriusXM Octane, their first with new label Revival Recordings. The band's track "Face The Rain (Feat. Howard Jones)" also premiered on Octane, and was released on September 23, 2021, alongside the announcement that their new EP DAMNA would be released on December 3, 2021.

On January 20, 2023, Eyes Set To Kill announced that Anissa Rodriguez had rejoined the band. On July 10, 2024, the band released a new single, "Wilderness".

== Band members ==
Current

- Alexia Rodriguez – lead guitar, keyboards, piano (2003–present); clean vocals (2007–present); backing vocals (2003–2007), bass (2016–2023); rhythm guitar (2013–2015, 2022–2024)
- Anissa Rodriguez – bass (2003–2016, 2023–present)
- Caleb Clifton – drums, percussion, samples (2006–present)
- Jeremy Anderson – unclean vocals, rhythm guitar (2024–present; 2023–2024; touring)

Former

- Spencer Merrill – unclean vocals (2003)
- David Phipps – drums, percussion (2003)
- Austin Vanderbur – unclean vocals (2003–2006)
- Zack Hansen – rhythm guitar (2003–2005)
- John Moody – rhythm guitar (2005–2006)
- Milad Sadegi – drums, percussion (2003–2006)
- Lindsey Vogt – clean vocals (2003–2007)
- Alex Torres – rhythm and lead guitar, backing vocals (2006–2007)
- Brandon Anderson – unclean vocals, rhythm guitar, keyboards, programming (2006–2010)
- Justin Denson – unclean vocals, keyboards, programming (2010)
- Greg Kerwin – rhythm guitar (2007–2011), lead guitar (2007–2010)
- Cisko Miranda – unclean vocals (2010–2014), rhythm guitar (2011–2014)
- AJ Bartholomew – unclean vocals, rhythm guitar (2015-2022), bass (2016-2017, 2017-2022)
- Tiaday Xavier Ball – bass, backing vocals (2017)

Touring

- Justin Whitesel – rhythm and lead guitar (2011)
- David Molina – rhythm and lead guitar (2011)
- Manny Contreras – rhythm and lead guitar (2016-2017)
- Comron Fouladi – bass, backing vocals (2017–2019)
- Kevin Koelsch – bass (2019–2023)

- Matthew Mele – rhythm guitar, Unclean Vocals (2026)

Timeline

== Discography ==
- Reach (2008)
- The World Outside (2009)
- Broken Frames (2010)
- White Lotus (2011)
- Masks (2013)
- Eyes Set to Kill (2018)

== Awards and nominations ==
=== Revolver Golden Gods Awards ===
Year	Recipient	Award	Result
2010	Alexia & Anissa Rodriguez	Hottest Chick(s) in Metal	Nominated
