= Shower (disambiguation) =

A shower is a place in which a person bathes under a spray of typically warm or hot water.

Shower or showers may also refer to:

- Shower (precipitation), an abrupt and rapid fall of rain or snow
- In British English an incompetent group or (less commonly) an individual

== Arts, entertainment, and media ==
- Shower (film), a 1999 Chinese comedy drama
- The Shower (film), a 1992 Canadian comedy-drama film
- "Shower" (song), by Becky G, 2014
- "Rain Shower" or "Shower" ("Sonagi"), a 1959 Korean short story, and 1979 film
- "The Shower", an episode of The O.C. (season 1)

== People ==
- Shower (surname), including a list of people with the name
- Showers (surname), including a list of people with the name

== Other uses ==
- Mount Showers, a mountain in Antarctica
- Shower (juggling), a juggling pattern
- Showers-Aero, an American aerospace design firm
- Warm Showers, an international hospitality exchange platform for cyclists
- Shower, a party associated with a significant event in a person's life, at which the person usually receives gifts

== See also ==
- April Showers (disambiguation)
- Baby shower, an event at which new or expecting parents receive gifts
- Bridal shower, an event at which an impending bride receives gifts
- Meteor shower, an event at which several meteors radiate from one point
- Particle shower, a cascade of subatomic particles
