= Party (disambiguation) =

A party is a social gathering.

Party may also refer to:

- Political party, an organized group of people with same ideology who field candidates for elections
  - Lists of political parties
- Party (law), a person or group of persons composing a single entity for the purposes of the law

== Film, television, radio and theatre ==
- Party (1984 film), a Hindi-language film
- Party (1994 film), an American short film
- Party (1996 film), a Portuguese-French comedy-drama
- Party (2001 film), an Iranian film starring Hedieh Tehrani
- Party (2006 film), a Telugu-language comedy film
- Party (2018 film), a Marathi-language film
- Party (2019 film), a Tamil-language comedy film
- Party, a stage play by Tom Basden
  - Party (radio series), a BBC Radio 4 sitcom adapted from the play

=== Television episodes ===
- "Party" (Beavis and Butt-Head), 1995
- "Party" (Black Books), 2004
- "Party" (The Mighty Boosh), 2007
- "Party" (Not Going Out), 2009
- "Party" (Starstruck), 2022
- "Party" (Undergrads), 2001
- "Party!", a 1986 episode of Pee-wee's Playhouse

== Music ==
=== Albums ===
- Party (Iggy Pop album), 1981
- Party (Nick Swardson album), 2007
- Party (Pet Shop Boys album), 2009
- Party (Aldous Harding album), 2017
- Party, by Bloodstone, 1984
- Party, by Yellowman, 1991
- Beach Boys' Party!, by The Beach Boys, 1967

=== Songs ===
- "Party" (Bad Bunny and Rauw Alejandro song), 2022
- "Party" (Beyoncé song), 2011
- "Party" (The Blue Hearts song), 1993
- "Party" (Chris Brown song), 2016
- "Party" (Christine Anu song), 1995
- "Party" (Girls' Generation song), 2015
- "Party" (JP Cooper song), 2016
- "Party" (Ofenbach and Lack of Afro song), 2017
- "Party" (Paulo Londra song), 2019
- "Party" (Ringo Starr song), unreleased
- "Party" (Troye Sivan song), 2026
- "Party (Follow Me)", a song by Hyuna from the 2017 EP Following
- "Party", a song by Adore Delano from the 2014 album Till Death Do Us Party
- "Party", a song by Boston from the 1978 album Don't Look Back
- "Party", a song by The D4, from the 2001 album 6twenty
- "Party", a song by Demi Lovato, from the 2008 album Don't Forget
- "Party", a song by DJ Mustard, from the 2016 album Cold Summer
- "Party", a song by Elvis Presley, from the 1957 album Loving You
- "Party", a song by the Human League, from the 1986 album Crash
- "Party", a song by Kris Kross, from the 1992 album Totally Krossed Out
- "Party", a song by Michael Learns to Rock, from the 1997 album Nothing to Lose
- "Party", a song by Nelly Furtado, from the 2000 album Whoa, Nelly!
- "Party", a song by David Jones and Steve Pitts, from the 1987 album, Missing Links
- "Party", a song by Queen, from the 1989 album The Miracle
- "Party", a song by Shonen Knife, from the 2019 album Sweet Candy Power
- "Party", a song by Wifiskeleton, from the 2024 mixtape Suburban Daredevil
- "P.A.R.T.Y.", a single by Alestorm from the 2022 album Seventh Rum of a Seventh Rum

== Other uses ==
- Party (magazine), a Chinese literary magazine
- Party (role-playing games), a group of characters adventuring together in a game
- Party (Sydney newspaper), by the Communist Party of Australia from June 1942
- Party, a partition of the field in heraldry
- PARTY Program (Prevent Alcohol and Risk Related Trauma in Youth), an international health promotion program
- PARTIES (Protected Area Run Time Interface Extension Services), in computing

== See also ==
- Parti (disambiguation)
- Partial (disambiguation)
- First party (disambiguation)
- Third party (disambiguation)
- The Party (disambiguation)
- Pity Party (disambiguation)
- Shower (disambiguation)
