= The Party =

The Party may refer to:

== Arts and entertainment ==
- The Party (Nineteen Eighty-Four) or Ingsoc, a fictional political entity in Orwell's Nineteen Eighty-Four

=== Film ===
- The Party (1968 film), an American comedy film
- The Party (1990 film), a Canadian drama film
- Party (1996 film), a Portuguese-French comedy-drama film
- The Party (2017 film), a British comedy film

=== Television ===
- The Party, Nigerian TV series
- "The Party" (Brooklyn Nine-Nine), an episode of the American TV sitcom
- "The Party" (Peep Show), an episode of the British TV sitcom
- "The Party" (Modern Family), an episode of the American TV sitcom
- "The Party", the pilot episode of As Told by Ginger
- "The Party", an episode of Combat! (1963 TV series)
- "The Party", an episode of Dynasty (1981 TV series)
- "The Party", an episode of Life with Derek
- "The Party", an episode of Animaniacs
- "The Party", an episode of M*A*S*H (season 7)
- "The Party", an episode of The Proud Family
- "The Party", an episode of The Ropers
- "The Party", an episode of The Amazing World Of Gumball
- "The Party", an episode of The Office (British TV series)
- "The Party", an episode of Ben & Holly's Little Kingdom

=== Theatre ===
- The Party (play), a 1958 play by Jane Arden
- The Party, a play by Trevor Griffiths

=== Music ===
- The Party (band), an American pop band
  - The Party (The Party album), 1990
- The Party (Alexia album), 1998
- The Party (Andy Shauf album), 2016
- The Party (Casiopea album), 1990
- The Party (Houston Person album), 1991
- "The Party", a song by Childish Gambino from Because the Internet, 2013
- "The Party", or "Tthhee Ppaarrttyy", a song by Justice featuring vocals from Uffie on Cross, 2007
- "The Party", a song by Phil Ochs on his 1967 album Pleasures of the Harbor
- "The Party" (Uncanny X-Men song), 1985
- "The Party" (Hightower song), 2017
- "The Party", a song by Maisie Peters from the soundtrack of Trying: Season 2, 2021

== Organizations and events ==
- The Party (politics), in a one-party state (including a list of such parties)
- The Party (demoparty), an annual demoscene event in Denmark 1991–2002
- Triumph Heritage Empowerment Party (T.H.E. Party), a political party in Papua New Guinea
- Die PARTEI (German, 'The PARTY'), a political party in Germany

== Websites ==
- Soyjak.party, a website dedicated to the sharing and posting of soyjaks.

== See also ==
- Party (disambiguation)
- The Party Album (disambiguation)
- The Parties (disambiguation)
