= Partie =

Partie may refer to:

- Partie (cards), a session or complete game in cards
- Douglas Partie (born 1961), American volleyball player
- Partita, or partie, a single-instrumental piece of music, or dance suite

== See also ==
- Parti (disambiguation)
- Party (disambiguation)
- Partial (disambiguation)
- Chef de partie, a chef in charge of a particular area of production in a restaurant
