= College Park Industries =

American prosthetics manufacturer

College Park Industries, Inc.
- Founded: Warren, Michigan (July 8, 1988)
- Headquarters: United States
- Products: prosthetic, artificial limbs
- Website: www.college-park.com

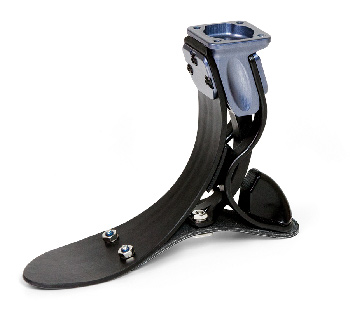
The Soleus foot.

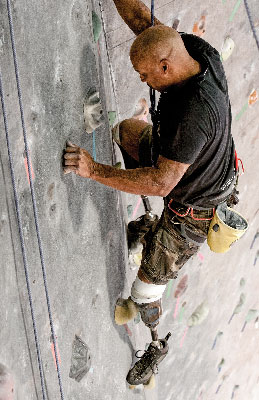
Bilateral lower-limb amputee Reggie Showers rock climbing on Trustep feet.

College Park Industries is a prosthetics manufacturer headquartered in Warren, Michigan. The company was founded in 1988 after a local machinist set out to create the world's most anatomically correct prosthetic foot.

College Park's first product was the Trustep® foot, which mimics the anatomical movement of a foot by replicating the bones and tendons through composites, bumpers and bushings. Since the release of the Trustep®, College Park has gone on to design and develop many other innovative prosthetic feet that utilize their proprietary Intelliweave™ composites. These include the Truper®, the first multi-axial pediatric foot; the Soleus®, which was the first to incorporate Integrated Spring Technology (iST™); the heel-height adjustable Accent® foot; and the Odyssey® K2 & Odyssey® K3 feet which have a patented curved hydraulic ankle. College Park also manufacturers other prosthetic products, including endoskeleton components, liners, and sleeves. The company is ISO 13485 certified and sells its products worldwide. In 2015, College Park acquired Liberating Technologies, Inc., an upper-limb prosthetics company.
