= Parti =

Parti may refer to:

- Parti (service), an online video platform, web hosting, livestreaming, and cloud services business.
- Parti (surname), a Hungarian surname, and a list of people with the name
- Parti (architecture), the organizing concepts behind an architect's design
- Parti people
- Lake Parti, a lake in Russia

== See also ==
- Partie (disambiguation)
- Party (disambiguation)
- Partial (disambiguation)
- Partita (also partie, partia, parthia, or parthie), a single-instrumental piece of music, or dance suite
- Parti-coloured bat
