= Showers (surname) =

Showers is a surname. Notable people with the name include:

- Derek Showers (born 1953), Welsh footballer
- Edward Maclean Showers (died 1925), British soldier, police officer, and Chief Constable
- Jameill Showers (born 1991), American football quarterback
- Jan Showers, American interior designer
- John Showers (born 1952), American politician from Pennsylvania
- Mel Showers, American journalist and news presenter
- Michael Showers (born 1945), English convicted drug dealer
- Michael Showers (actor) (1966–2011), American actor
- Reggie Showers (born 1964), American drag racer
- Shea Showers (born 1974), American football player

== See also ==
- Shower (surname)
