= The Parties (band) =

Background information
- Origin: San Francisco, California, United States
- Genre: Rock
- Years active: 2006 – present
- Members: Rob Uytingco, Jeremy Powers, Adam Symons
- Website: thepartiesrock.com

The Parties is an American psych rock group based in San Francisco, California, United States.

The Parties' brand of powerpop harkens back to the classic era of melodic songwriting popularized by such bands as The Byrds, The Beatles, The Zombies, The Who and The Beach Boys, as well as bands involved in the 1980s Paisley Underground scene and the 1990s shoegaze phenomenon. The Parties have received accolades from such national publications as Uncut magazine, AllMusic and Amplifier Magazine. They have played in the International Pop Overthrow Festival, New York's CMJ and Austin's SXSW, and have shared the stage with The Shore, Sky Parade, The New Fidelity, The Waking Hours, Prabir and The Substitutes, The High Dials, and The Parson Redheads.

== History ==
The Parties were formed in 2004 by Red Planet alumnus Jeremy Powers and Richmond, Virginia songwriter and drummer John L. Morgan IV, who had a joint love for all things Lennon-McCartney. The two soon hooked up with bassist Rex Padayhag, who grew up in the Philippines playing with various bands on the Manila psychedelic pop circuit, and Oakland guitarist Sarah Melfeld.

== Three Ring Circus ==
Three Ring Circus Records saw the band in Sacramento multiple times and asked to put out the EP (in digital format only) that the boys had already recorded themselves and that they had been selling at shows. They agreed to this but wanted more exposure and press. Failing to get that, the band sent a letter to Rainbow Quartz Records along with a demo, and the band had a new deal.

=== The Parties-EP ===
==== Track listing ====
1. What's Your Name - Jeremy Powers, lead vocals

2. Breaking Hearts - Jeremy Powers, lead vocals

3. Down By the Water - John Morgan, lead vocals

4. The Parties - Jeremy Powers, lead vocals

5. Noose - Rex Padayhag, lead vocals

7. Twistin' The Knife- Jeremy Powers, lead vocals

Personnel:

Sarah Mehlfield, guitar; John Morgan, drums, vox; Rex Padayhag, bass, vox; Jeremy Powers, guitar, vox

== Rainbow Quartz Records ==
After sending demos to Jim McGarry at Rainbow Quartz Records, The Parties landed a recording contract and finished up a handful of demos for their debut-length LP, Can't Come Down.

=== Can't Come Down ===
==== Track listing ====
1. Love for Sale - John Morgan, lead vocals

2. Breaking Hearts - Jeremy Powers, lead vocals

3. Cold Life - Rex Padayhag, lead vocals

4. Yours and Mine - Jeremy Powers, lead vocals

5. The Parties - Jeremy Powers, lead vocals

6. Radio - John Morgan, lead vocals

7. Velvet Love Affair - Rex Padayhag, lead vocals

8. Waterfall - Rex Padayhag, lead vocals

9. Gotta Get Out - Jeremy Powers, lead vocals

10. Damned by the Sunshine - Jeremy Powers, lead vocals

11. Much Better - John Morgan, lead vocals

Personnel:

Sarah Mehlfield, guitar; John Morgan, drums; Rex Padayhag, bass; Jeremy Powers, guitar

=== Cryin' Shame EP ===
The Cryin' Shame EP was released in 2009. Originally planned as a full-length album, Morgan had decided to return to his home state of Virginia, so a final recording session turned into a five-song EP. The EP was released in November, 2009 by Rainbow Quartz, and showcased everyone's songwriting and singing.

Track listing:

1. Cryin' Shame - Jeremy Powers, lead vocals

2. I Disagree - John Morgan, lead vocals

3. Kensington Avenue Adam Symons, lead vocals

4. Blame it on the Sun - John Morgan, lead vocals

5. She's Gone Away - Rex Padayhag, lead vocals

Personnel:

Adam Symons, guitar, vox; John Morgan, drums, vox; Rex Padayhag, bass, piano, organ, vox; Jeremy Powers, guitar, vox.

=== Coast Garde ===
Coast Garde was the band's second CD with Rainbow Quartz and first with the new line-up with drummer Rob Uytingco. The release was followed by multiple shows, but reviews were mixed, and Rex Padayhag, who had been the glue in the band as a lead and harmony singer while playing bass, organ, and piano, ultimately decided to leave.

== Discography ==
- The Parties (EP, self-released, 2007) - out of print
- The Parties, (EP, digital release only, Three Ring Records, 2006)
- Can't Come Down (CD, Rainbow Quartz, 2008)
- Cryin' Shame (EP, Rainbow Quartz, November 2009)
- Coast Garde (CD, Rainbow Quartz, November 2010)

== Current members ==
Jeremy Powers - guitar, vocals
Adam Symons - guitar, vocals
Rob Uytingco - drums

== Past members ==
Sara Melfeld - guitar, vocals
John L. Morgan IV - drums, vocals
Rex Padayhag, vocals, bass, keyboard, piano

== Related acts ==
- The Byrds
- The Black Angels
- Sky Parade
- The Who
- The High Dials
- The Shore
- The Dandy Warhols
- Black Rebel Motorcycle Club
- The Zombies
- The Brian Jonestown Massacre
- The New Fidelity
- The Parson Redheads
- Luna
- Blue Skies for Black Hearts
- The Family Arsenal
- Red Planet
