= The Parties =

The Parties may refer to:

- The Parties (band)
- "The Parties", an episode of That's So Raven
- "The Parties", an episode of Palak Pe Jhalak, the Indian adaptation of That's So Raven
- Protected Area Run Time Interface Extension Services (PARTIES), a BIOS interface to access reserved areas on harddisks

== See also ==
- The Party (disambiguation)
