= Doom loop =

A doom loop may be:

== Science ==
- In economics, a doom loop is a negative spiral that can result when banks hold sovereign bonds and governments bail out banks.
- An urban doom loop is a negative economic spiral that results from increasing remote work, leading urban businesses to close and to a loss of tax revenue, which then leads cities to cut services and raise taxes.
- A climate doom loop occurs when consequences of climate change and the failure to address it draw focus and resources from tackling its root causes.

== Music ==
- Doom Loop, an album by English band Dream Nails
- "Doom Loop" (song), by English band President

== See also ==
- Vicious spiral
