= Kyle Bunting =

Textile designer

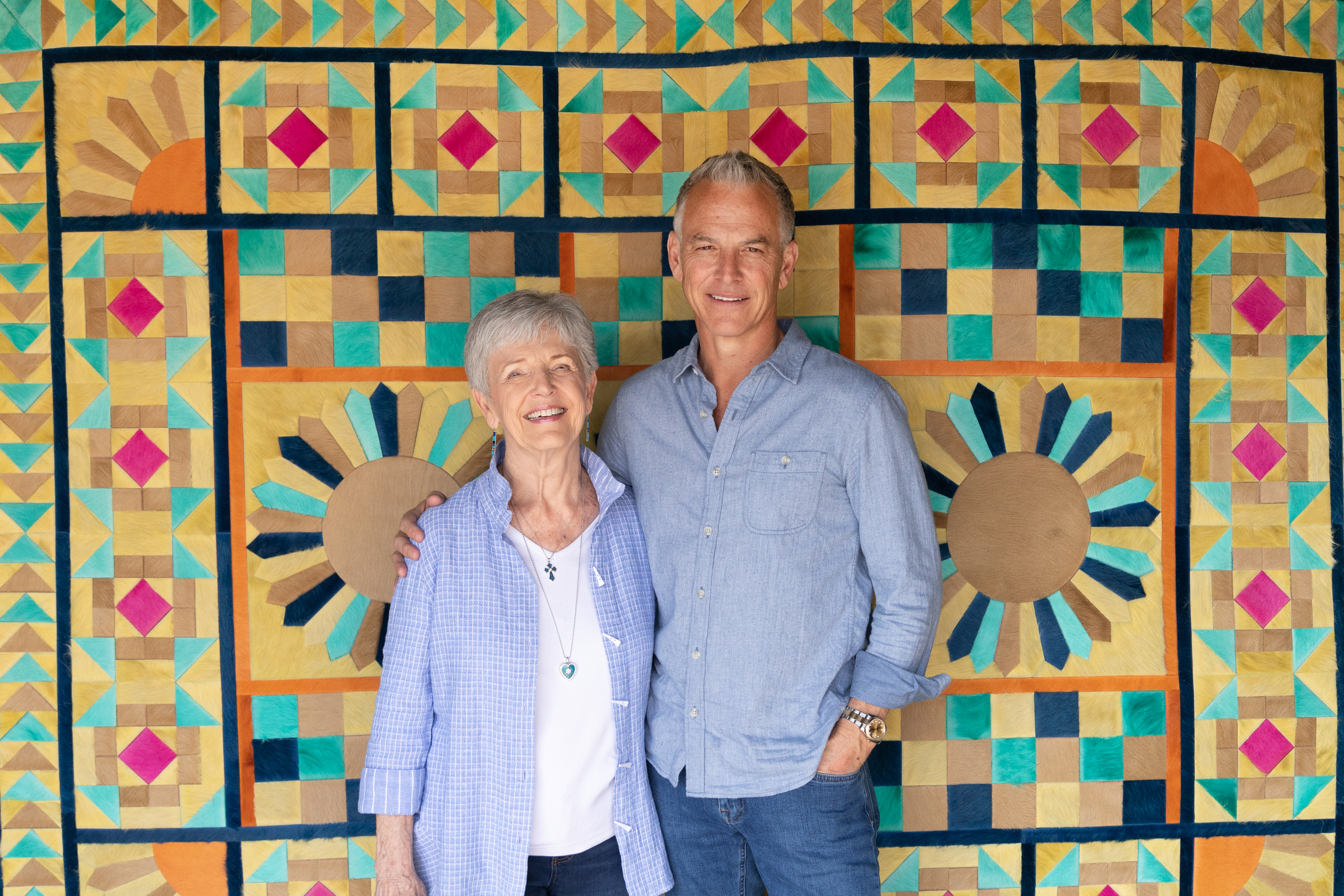
Kyle Bunting and his mother, Peggy.

Kyle Bunting is a textile designer specializing in handcrafted hair-on-hide rugs. The original creator of the decorative hide rug, Bunting has collaborated with numerous designers and designed for celebrities.

== Biography ==
Bunting was born in Greensboro, North Carolina, and raised in Austin, Texas. He graduated from the University of Texas in Austin and worked in television for years before opening his hide rug studio in 2001.

== Career ==
A cowhide wallcovering depicting an image of Texas state, a handmade gift from Bunting’s father, inspired his start in hide rug design. After quitting his career in television, Bunting recalled seeing the design and yelling, “I'm going to make rugs. Out of hide!” Bunting began working from a studio in San Francisco and later moved to Austin, Texas, where he and a team of artisans have custom designed and manufactured over a half a million square feet of rugs and wall coverings made from European cowhides. Bunting’s design mantra is “Any size, any shape, any color”.

Bunting has collaborated with numerous interior designers and artists, including Jan Showers and photographer Douglas Friedman. In 2011, he introduced a red carpet at several award shows. In 2017, Bunting partnered with New York City designer Amy Lau and launched a collection of modern rugs called Prisma. In 2021, in collaboration with designer Timothy Corrigan, Bunting introduced “Chateau” a line of rugs inspired by Corrigan’s estate in Loire Valley, France. In 2022, Bunting collaborated with his own mother, Peggy Bunting, to create a new collection of rugs "Stateside" which was inspired by American quilts.

Bunting’s work has appeared in prominent publications including the New York Times, where his collaboration with Amy Lau was featured, as well as his work with Andrew Suvalsky in the Kips Bay Decorator Showroom. Bunting's "Four Seasons" collection was featured in Robb Report, and he has spoken as a source on hide to Robb Report and Architectural Digest. Bunting is also frequently featured in regional Texas magazines such as Paper City and Texas Monthly
