= Timothy Corrigan =

Timothy Corrigan may refer to:

- Timothy J. Corrigan (born 1956), American lawyer and judge
- Timothy Corrigan (interior designer), American interior designer
