= Identity change =

Identity change describes the intentional changes to an identity document or digital identity. The topic is of particular interest in "faceless" financial transactions and computer security. There are several different parties who may initiate the change:

- A first party, the original bearer of an identity may initiate the change
- A second party, who wishes to use the identity, may initiate the change
- A third party may initiate an identity change
- In some instances, multiple parties cooperate to change an identity.

Identity change can be categorized in several ways:

- Identity takeover (identity theft / identity fraud)
- Identity delegation
- Identity exchange
- Identity deletion
- Identity restoration

== See also ==
- Identity management
- Biometrics
- Witness protection

== Sources ==
- Top Five Reasons Why People Change Their Identity
- ID-related Crime: Towards a Common Ground for Interdisciplinary Research
- Myth Of Identity Change
