= Prabir and The Substitutes =

Background information
- Origin: Richmond, Virginia, U.S.
- Genre: Rock
- Years active: 2005 – 2009
- Members: Prabir Mehta; Chris Smith; Charlie Glenn; Robbie King; Tyler Willams
- Website: PrabirAndTheSubstitutes.com

Prabir and The Substitutes was an American pop-rock band from Richmond, Virginia. The band released multiple recordings while touring alongside Dr. Dog, The Silver Beats, The Parties, and The Old Ceremony. Although an independent band, the Substitutes received accolades from such national publications as the AllMusic Guide, Paste, and The A.V. Club. Additionally, the band won the Wammie Award for 2008 New Artist of the Year.

== Current members ==
- Prabir Mehta - Guitar, vocals
- Chris Smith - Guitar, vocals
- Charlie Glenn - Organ, vocals
- Robbie King - Bass, vocals
- Tyler Williams - Drums, vocals

== Past members ==
- Shawn Lynch - Drums, vocals
- Adam Thompson - Bass, vocals
- Adam Palamore - Drums

== History ==
Prabir and The Substitutes formed at the end of 2005, following the demise of Prabir Mehta's former group, The Rachel Nevadas. At the time of its inception, the band consisted of Mehta, guitarist Chris Smith, bassist Adam Thompson, and drummer Adam Palamore (Ramen Holiday). Shawn Lynch soon replaced Palamore on drums, while Charlie Glenn joined in early 2007 as the group's organist. Later that year, bassist Robbie King and drummer Tyler Williams stepped in to solidify the Substitutes' current lineup.

The band toured alongside The Silver Beats in support of their album, 5 Little Pieces.

The band announced it would play its last show at Gallery 5 in Richmond, VA on December 12, 2009.

After Prabir and the Substitutes broke up, Mehta formed the band Goldrush with Richmond Symphony Orchestra members Matt and Treesa Gold, and drummer Gregg Brooks (formerly of River City High). In 2012, Goldrush collaborated with Motion City Soundtrack to release a single on MAD Dragon Records. Williams joined The Head and the Heart. Glenn co-founded Palm Palm with J. Roddy Walston (formerly of J. Roddy Walston and the Business).

== Discography ==
- EP (Pop Faction, 2006; reissued by Stereo Couture, 2011)
- Annabelle I'm Coming Home Tonight (Pop Faction, 2007; reissued by Stereo Couture, 2011)
- Share (Stereo Couture, 2007)
- 5 Little Pieces (Stereo Couture, 2008)
- Hello (Stereo Couture, 2009)
