= Sunshower =

Weather phenomenon in which rain falls while the sun is shining

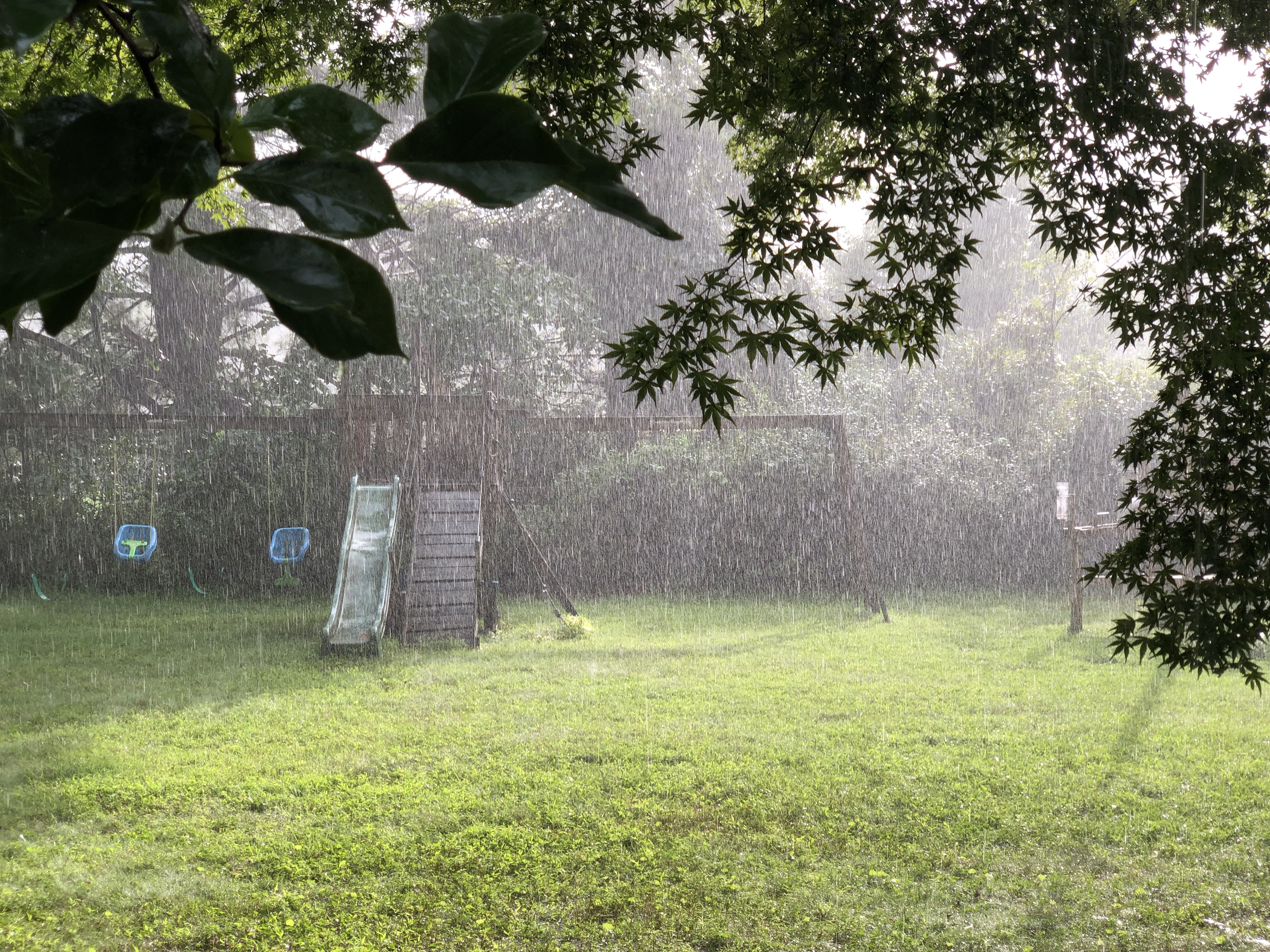
A sunshower over a backyard in Ewing Township, New Jersey

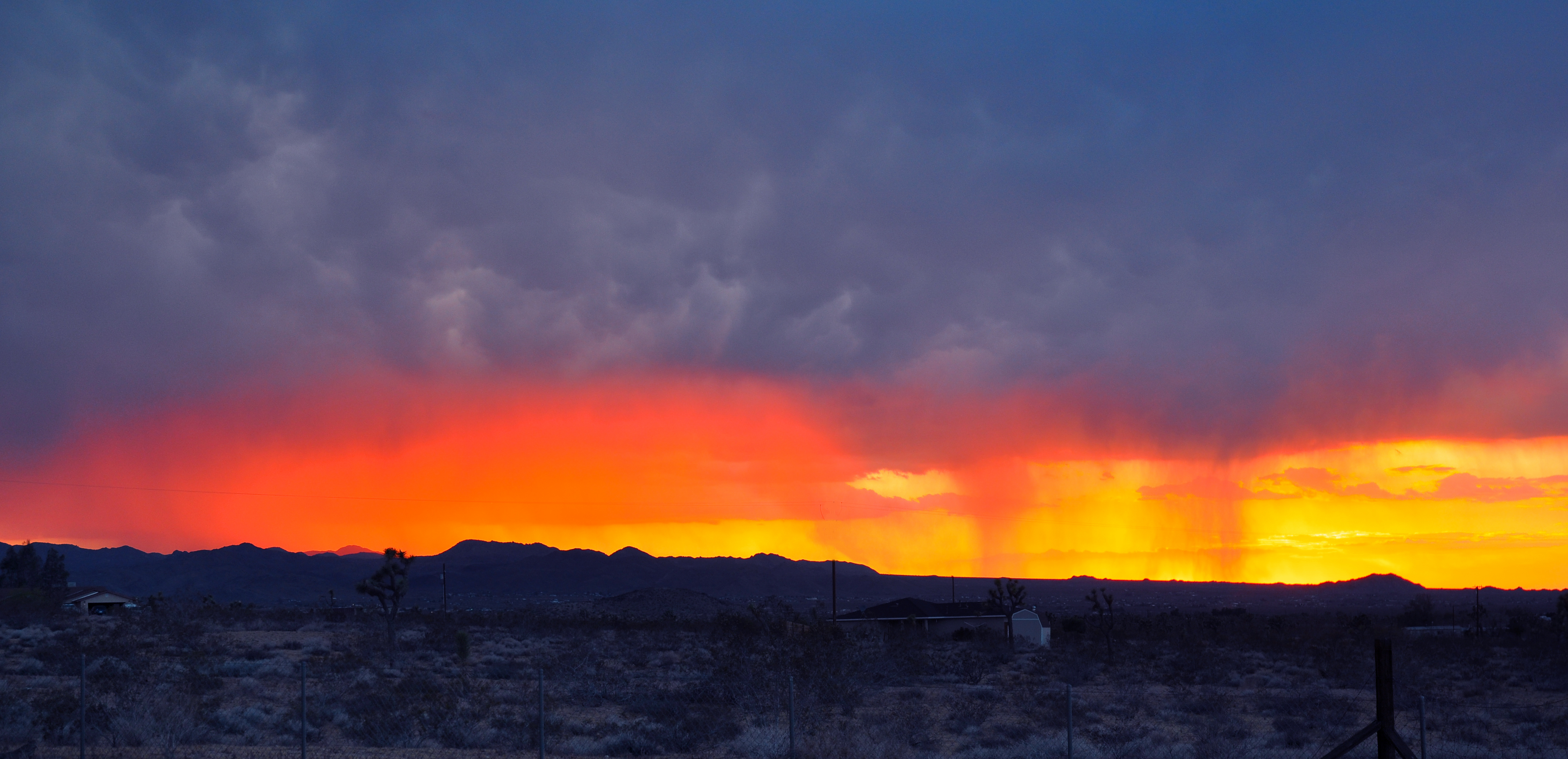
A sunset sunshower in the Mojave Desert

A sunshower, or sun shower, is a meteorological phenomenon in which rain falls while the sun is seen shining. A sunshower is usually a result of winds associated with a rain storm sometimes miles away, blowing the airborne raindrops into an area where there are no clouds. Sometimes a sunshower is created when a single rain shower cloud passes overhead, and the sun's angle keeps the sunlight from being obstructed by overhead clouds. Sunshower conditions often lead to the appearance of a rainbow, if the sun is at a sufficiently low angle.

== Names ==
Although the term "sunshower" is used in the United States, Canada, Australia, New Zealand, Ireland and the UK, it is rarely found in dictionaries. The phenomenon has a wide range of sometimes remarkably similar folkloric names in cultures around the world. A common theme is that of clever animals and tricksters like the devil or witches getting married, although many variations of this theme exist.

=== The Americas ===
- In Mexico, two phrases are common: In northern Mexico, it is said that "a doe is giving birth" (está pariendo una venada), whereas in southern Mexico, it is said that "two elders are getting married" (se están casando los viejitos).
- In Argentina is referred as "The Monkey at the Wedding of Mirtha Legrand" (El Mono del Casamiento de Mirtha Legrand), the phrase "A hag is getting married" (Se casa una vieja) is also common.
- In the Southern United States, a sunshower is said to occur when "the devil is beating his wife." A regional variation from Tennessee is "the devil is kissing his wife".
- Ketchikan, Alaska, is one of the most consistently rainy places on Earth, and has a meter in town to measure "Liquid Sunshine". This makes it an Alaskan Panhandle colloquialism.
- In Brazil, it's called "widow's marriage" (casamento de viúva).

=== Asia ===
- In Bihar it is called a "siyaar ke biyaah" ("jackals' wedding") with children singing about it.
- In Garo, it is called "peru bia ka'enga", which means "fox's/jackal's marriage".

Sunshower in Oze National Park, Japan

- In several parts of Japan, such as Kantō region, Chūbu region, Kansai region, Chūgoku region, Shikoku, and Kyushu, sunshowers are called "kitsune no yomeiri" (狐の嫁入り, "the fox's wedding")
- In Korea, it is called "the day of the fox's marriage" (여우 시집가는 날) or "the day of the tiger's marriage"(호랑이 장가가는 날)
- In Maharashtra region of India, in Marathi, it is called "Kolhyache Lagna" (कोल्ह्याचे लग्न), which means "marriage of a fox".
- In Malayalam, it is called "the fox's wedding" (കുറുക്കന്റെ കല്യാണം).
- In Odia, it is called "the fox's wedding" (ଖରା ହେଉଛି ମେଘ ହେଉଛି, ଶିଆଳ ପୁଅ ବାହା ହେଉଛି).
- In some Pahari languages of Himachal Pradesh, they say Takri: 𑚌𑚮𑚛𑚖𑚯𑚣𑚭𑚫 𑚤𑚭 𑚠𑚶𑚣𑚭𑚩, ISO: gidaḍīyām̐ rā byāh, meaning "Female Foxes' Wedding".
- In the Philippines, it is said the tikbalang is marrying.
- In Sri Lanka, it's called නරියන්ගේ මගුල් ගෙදර (nariyangē magul gedara) which means 'the foxes'/jackals' wedding house.'
- In the Vietnamese, Rain Shadow Cloud in the Sunshower, Mưa Bóng Mây (Thiếu Nhi) Tác giả: Tô Đông Hải.

=== Europe ===
- In Belgium, Flanders and The Netherlands: The traditional belief is that of "Duiveltjeskermis" or "Devil's fair".
- In France, it is either "Le diable bat sa femme et marie sa fille" "the devil beats his wife and marries his daughter", or "Le diable bat sa femme pour avoir des crêpes" "the devil beats his wife to have crêpes", and both were inspired from Plutarch's poem in Eusebius' Praeparatio Evangelica, where Zeus, angry with Hera, made her believe that he was marrying Daedale when in fact it was a wooden statue. Hera, jealous, provoked a heavy downpour on the wedding day but at the same time realised the trick. In order to redeem herself, she turned her cries into laughter, reconciled herself with Zeus, and happily took the lead of the wedding party, instituting the festival of Daedala in memory of the event.
- In Galicia, the traditional belief is that the vixen or the fox is getting married: casa a raposa / casa o raposo; sometimes the wolf and the vixen: Estanse casando o lobo coa raposa.
- In Catalonia, the children's song It rains and the sun shines associates sunshowers with the mood of witches: on the sunny side, they are happy and comb their hair; on the rainy side, they are grieving.
- In Portugal, the traditional expression is "Sol e chuva, casamento de viuva", or "Sun and rain, widow's wedding". Other similar expressions used are "Chuva e sol, casamento de Espanhol", which means "Rain and sun, Spaniard's wedding", or "Chuva e sol, casamento de raposa", which means "rain and sun, fox's wedding".
- A wide range of expressions are attested in German-speaking countries, many of them historically, e.g. "There's a feast day in hell" (Oldenburg), "marriage [in hell]" (East Frisia), "funfair [in hell]" (Westphalia, Rhineland), the latter one attested already in 1630. Others are "They're baking in hell", "The devil is making pancakes" (Oldenburg), "Frau Holle hosts a funfair" (Lower Rhineland), "There's a marriage among the heathens/gypsies" (Switzerland), "The devil's dancing with his grandmother" (Winsen district, Lower Saxony), "The devil is marrying" (Schleswig-Holstein), "The devil is endowing his daughters" (Mecklenburg). Often, the phenomenon is interpreted as a struggle between rain and sunshine. "The devil is beating his wife/grandmother/mother-in-law" (Bavaria, Austria, Lunenburg), "The deviless gets beaten" (Eger country, Bohemia), "The devil is stabbing his wife with a sword" (Celle, Lower Saxony), "The devil has hanged his mother" (Moselle). The versions referring to the devil's wife (instead of grandmother etc.) are the older ones. Praetorius (Blockes Berges Verrichtung, Leipzig 1668) mentions „Der Teufel schlägt seine Mutter, daß sie öl gibt“ (The devil is beating his mother so she will give oil). In Schleswig-Holstein and Oldenburg, there is also: "The devil is bleaching his grandmother", as this usually involved repeated dampening of cloth in the sun – quite fitting for the weather phenomenon. Otherwise, idioms refer to witches. "The witches are dancing", "The old witch is making pancakes" (Schleswig-Holstein), "The witches are making butter" (Silesia), "The witches are being buried at the end of the world" (North Frisia). Although later on witches are often depicted as the devil's mistresses, not a single idiom about sunshowers shows them as such. Around the Baltic Sea, there are also references to sunshowers and "whore's children", i.e. illegitimate children: "Now a whore's child has been sired/baptised" (Mecklenburg). Similar expressions could be found in Finland. Furthermore, there are humorous versions like: "A lieutenant is paying his debts" (Rhineland), "A nobleman goes to heaven" (Lunenburg), "A tailor goes to heaven" (Schleswig-Holstein, Upper Saxony), "The devil gets a lawyer's soul" (Oldenburg). Completely different in origin are "The wolf has fever/bellyache" or "Now the wolves are pissing" (Mecklenburg).
- In Russian, it is called грибной дождь (gribnoy dozhd'), "mushroom rain", as such conditions are traditionally believed to be favorable to growing mushrooms. Also, it is called слепой дождь (slepoy dozhd'), "blind rain", because it doesn't see that it shouldn't be raining.

=== Africa ===
- In South Africa, it is often referred to as a "monkey's wedding".
- In Afrikaans the idiom Jakkals trou met Wolf se vrou is used to refer to a sunshower. It translates to "Jackal marries Wolf's wife".
- It's a common belief in Nigeria that an elephant or lion is giving birth.

== See also ==
- April shower
