= Laura Day (designer) =

American interior designer

Laura Day is an American interior designer based in New York City. She is most widely known for her role in the fourth season of Trading Spaces. Her style is a combination of her outgoing personality mixed with her appreciation of classical design. Her work has been featured in such publications as The New York Times, Vogue, and Traditional Home. She also has her own online magazine, Laura Day Living, that features her DAYly blog along with much of her work and inspirations.
