= April Showers =

April Showers may refer to:

- April shower, spring rain in parts of the northern hemisphere, particularly the United Kingdom
- "April Showers" (song), a song by Louis Silvers, 1921
- "April Showers", a song by Maisie Peters from It's Your Bed Babe, It's Your Funeral, 2019
- April Showers (1923 film), American silent romantic film directed by Tom Forman
- April Showers (1948 film), American musical film directed by James V. Kern
- April Showers (2009 film), American independent drama film directed by Andrew Robinson
- April Showers (mixtape), 2013 mixtape by Wyclef Jean
- April's Shower, 2006 romantic film

== See also ==
- "Little April Shower", a song from the 1942 Disney film Bambi
- April Showers Bring May Flowers, 2016 manga series by Roku Sakura
