= Timothy Corrigan (interior designer) =

American interior designer

- Born: 1956 or 1957 (age 69–70)

Timothy Corrigan (born 1957) is an interior designer with offices in Los Angeles and Paris. His firm, Timothy Corrigan, Inc., specializes in interior design and incorporates antiques into most of its projects. His clients include European and Middle Eastern royalty, Hollywood celebrities and corporate leaders.

== Early life ==
Corrigan grew up in the Hancock Park neighborhood of Los Angeles, but moved with his family when he was 12. As an established designer he subsequently re-bought and remodelled his childhood home.

== Career ==
Prior to forming his design firm in 1998, Corrigan worked in advertising where he was president of international operations for Backer Speilvogel Bates Worldwide, which later became Bates Worldwide, then Saatchi & Saatchi's Bates Worldwide.

With offices in Los Angeles and Paris his firm has completed projects in Europe, the Middle East and across the United States.

=== Restoration ===
In addition to restoring his childhood home, Corrigan has purchased and renovated several châteaux in France.

In 2004, the French government sold him the Château du Grand-Lucé, located in Le Grand-Lucé within France's Loire Valley. The château and its gardens are listed as French National Landmarks, which posed additional challenges during the renovation. His 2013 book An Invitation to Chateau du Grand Luce details Corrigan's acquisition of the 1764 manor and its subsequent restoration as his private home. In 2017, Corrigan sold the Château du Grand Lucé

In spring of 2018, he purchased the Chateau de la Chevallerie, and began the renovation process, overseeing it remotely during the Covid-19 travel ban.

=== Licensing ===
Corrigan has designed several licensed collections. The first collection, introduced in 2014, was an integrated line of fabrics, trims, furniture, and floor coverings for Schumacher. He went on to design two additional collections for the brand, including wallpaper. He has designed three tabletop collections for Royal Limoges, a collection of high-end bathroom fittings and accessories for THG Paris, a wallcovering collection for Fromental, and two passementerie collections for Samuel & Sons Timothy has designed several collections of performance fabrics and rugs for Perennials. He designed a collection of hide rugs for Kyle Bunting. He has designed luxury linens, bath, and tabletop collections for Dea Fine Linens.

His collection for THG Paris was exhibited at the Musée des Arts Décoratifs in 2025 as part of the centennial exhibit of Art Deco.

== Press ==
Corrigan has been featured in publications including The Times, The Wall Street Journal, Architectural Digest, Elle Décor, Point de vue, The New York Times, InStyle, Traditional Home, and Town & Country. He has also appeared on national and international television, including on HGTV’s Million Dollar Rooms, HGTV’s Top Ten, LXTV’s International Open House – Paris, and Extra. He was chosen to design the Architectural Digest green room at the 59th Primetime Emmy Awards.

== Awards ==
- Architectural Digest AD100 (World's Top Interior Designers and Architects); one of only nine designers who were consecutively on the list since 2007
- "Elle Decor 2020 A-List: 125 of the Best Interior Designers in The World"
- "Elle Decor 2019 A-List"
- "Elle Decor 2018 A-List"
- "2017 Design Icon" Las Vegas Market
- Luxe Interiors + Design 2017 & 2019 Gold List
- 2014 "Star of Design" Award for Interior Design, Pacific Design Center in West Hollywood, CA
- Corrigan is the only American designer honored by the French Heritage Society, for his restoration work of landmark buildings in France.
- Robb Report's Top 40 Interior Designers in the World, 2007
- Corrigan was honored by The Institute of Classical Architecture and Art Southern California Chapter at their annual Legacy Dinner in October 2018, for his achievements and contributions in advancing the classical tradition in architecture and art.
- Named to the Departures Design Council in 2019.

== Books ==
Timothy has authored three books, published by Rizzoli: “An Invitation to Chateau du Grand-Lucé,”“The New Elegance: Stylish, Comfortable Rooms for Today", and “At Home in France: Inspiration and Style in Town and Country".

== Philanthropy ==
Timothy has served on several philanthropic boards, including CalArts, the Institute of Classical Architecture, and the French Heritage Society. As of January 2026, Timothy was appointed Chairman of the French Heritage Society.
