= The Party Album =

The Party Album may refer to:

- The Party Album (Alexis Korner album), released 1980
- The Party Album (Vengaboys album), released 1999
- The Party Album, 2002 album by Goldie Lookin Chain
- Party Album, 1995 album by the Outhere Brothers

== See also ==
- Let It All Be Music - The Party Album, 2009 album by Boney M.
- The Party (disambiguation), for albums titled The Party
