= Krod Records =

KROD Records
- Founded: 2015
- Founder: Jordan Calvi
- Genre: punk rock
- Country of origin: France
- Location: Berlin, Germany
- Official website: www.krodrecords.com

KROD Records is an independent punk rock record label based in Berlin, Germany. KROD Records was created in 2015 in Toulouse, France, and it is owned by Jordan Calvi. The label was named Keine Rose ohne Dornen at the beginning and it evolved into Krod quickly. The label currently has 11 active bands.

== History ==
KROD Records is a French punk rock independent record label created in Toulouse, France, in 2015 by owner Jordan Calvi. Shortly thereafter, Loïc Gauthey joined the team.

In 2016, KROD Records began to work with the French punk hardcore band Fire At Will to release Life Goes On album. They followed this up with the addition of Colour Me Wednesday from London and German band The Deadnotes to release a retrospective ep Anyone & Everyone followed by a full-length album I'll Kiss All Fears Out Of Your Face.

In February 2017, they celebrated their second birthday with a show in Toulouse with Tiny Moving Parts, Trash Boat, Daylight and Skull Soda at Le Cri de la Mouette.

In May 2017, they announced the release of the second album Club Dragon from Hightower. In June, they signed Dream Nails for the release of two singles.

In the end of 2017, they add South Berkeley in their family.

In 2018, they celebrated their third anniversary in Berlin with Daggermouth, Hightower, The Deadnotes and Kill Her First.

== Active KROD Records bands ==
- Atlas for Home
- Back Garden Light
- Back On Earth
- Basement Gary
- Between Bodies
- Between Owls
- Can't Bear This Party!
- Chaos Commute
- Colour Me Wednesday
- Dream Nails
- Droïd Fantôm
- Elm Tree Circle
- Homeground
- Kill Her First
- Liotta Seoul
- Livingston
- P.O. Box
- Phantom Bay
- Pluto The Racer
- Quitters
- The Kid Vs. Me
- The Vernal
- Topsy Turvy's
- XO Armor
- Yvet Garden

== Previous and affiliated KROD Records bands ==
- Adversity
- Bloodsport
- Cold Reading
- Earl Grey
- Fake Off
- Fire At Will
- Flèche
- Forgive
- Gibberish
- Hell's Ditch
- Hightower
- Makeshift Promise
- Prey Drive
- Raincheck
- Resolve
- Skull Soda
- South Berkeley
- The Deadnotes
- This Life

== Releases ==
| Catalog Number | Artist | Title | Format(s) | Release date |
|---|---|---|---|---|
| KRD001 | Quitters | Move On To Honest Things | LP | May 1, 2015 |
| KRD002 | Earl Grey | Passing Time | CD/LP | October 9, 2015 |
| KRD003 | Topsy Turvy's | I Expect Nothing and I'm Still Let Down | 10" | October 16, 2015 |
| KRD004 | This Life | Stories of the Year | CD | October 14, 2015 |
| KRD005 | Fire At Will | Life Goes On | CD/LP | April 14, 2016 |
| KRD006 | Colour Me Wednesday | Anyone & Everyone | 7" | July 12, 2016 |
| KRD007 | The Deadnotes | I'll Kiss All Fears Out Of Your Face | LP | October 7, 2016 |
| KRD008 | Adversity | Figure Out | DL | July 20, 2016 |
| KRD009 | Fake Off | Boréal | LP | October 27, 2016 |
| KRD010 | Raincheck | True Love | LP | March 24, 2017 |
| KRD011S | Cold Reading | Books & Comfort | DL | July 18, 2017 |
| KRD011 | Cold Reading | Sojourner | LP/DL | September 22, 2017 |
| KRD012S | Hightower | The Party | DL | May 22, 2017 |
| KRD012 | Hightower | Club Dragon | CD/LP | September 15, 2017 |
| KRD013 | Kill Her First | Born To Be Strong | DL | March 29, 2016 |
| KRD014S | Dream Nails | Deep Heat | DL | June 5, 2017 |
| KRD015S | Dream Nails | DIY | DL | June 28, 2017 |
| KRD016 | Kill Her First | Kill Her Sexismracismhomophobia First | DL | February 5, 2014 |
| KRD017 | Makeshift Promise | I'm Not As Good As I Thought | DL | April 24, 2014 |
| KRD018 | Gibberish | Between Timid And Timbuktu | DL | July 22, 2016 |
| KRD019 | Skull Soda | Sleep Hunt Through The Mirror | DL | January 15, 2018 |
| KRD020S | Dream Nails | Tourist | DL | October 13, 2017 |
| KRD020 | Dream Nails | Dare To Care | DL | October 27, 2017 |
| KRD021S | South Berkeley | Tiny Rascals | DL | October 27, 2017 |
| KRD023 | Elm Tree Circle | The Good Life | CD/DL | May 11, 2018 |
| KRD023S1 | Elm Tree Circle | Feel The Burn | DL | February 9, 2018 |
| KRD023S2 | Elm Tree Circle | The Lease | DL | March 9, 2018 |
| KRD023S3 | Elm Tree Circle | Unleaded | DL | April 13, 2018 |
| KRD024 | Prey Drive | Tabula Rasa | DL | April 6, 2018 |
| KRD025 | Colour Me Wednesday | Counting Pennies in the Afterlife | LP/DL | May 15, 2018 |
| KRD026TAPE | Hightower/Daggermouth | Last Minute Split | Tape | April 21, 2018 |

== Krod Records Crew ==
- Jordan Calvi – Owner/Label manager
- Loïc Gauthey – Label Assistant

== See also ==
- List of record labels
