= Colour Me Wednesday =

English band

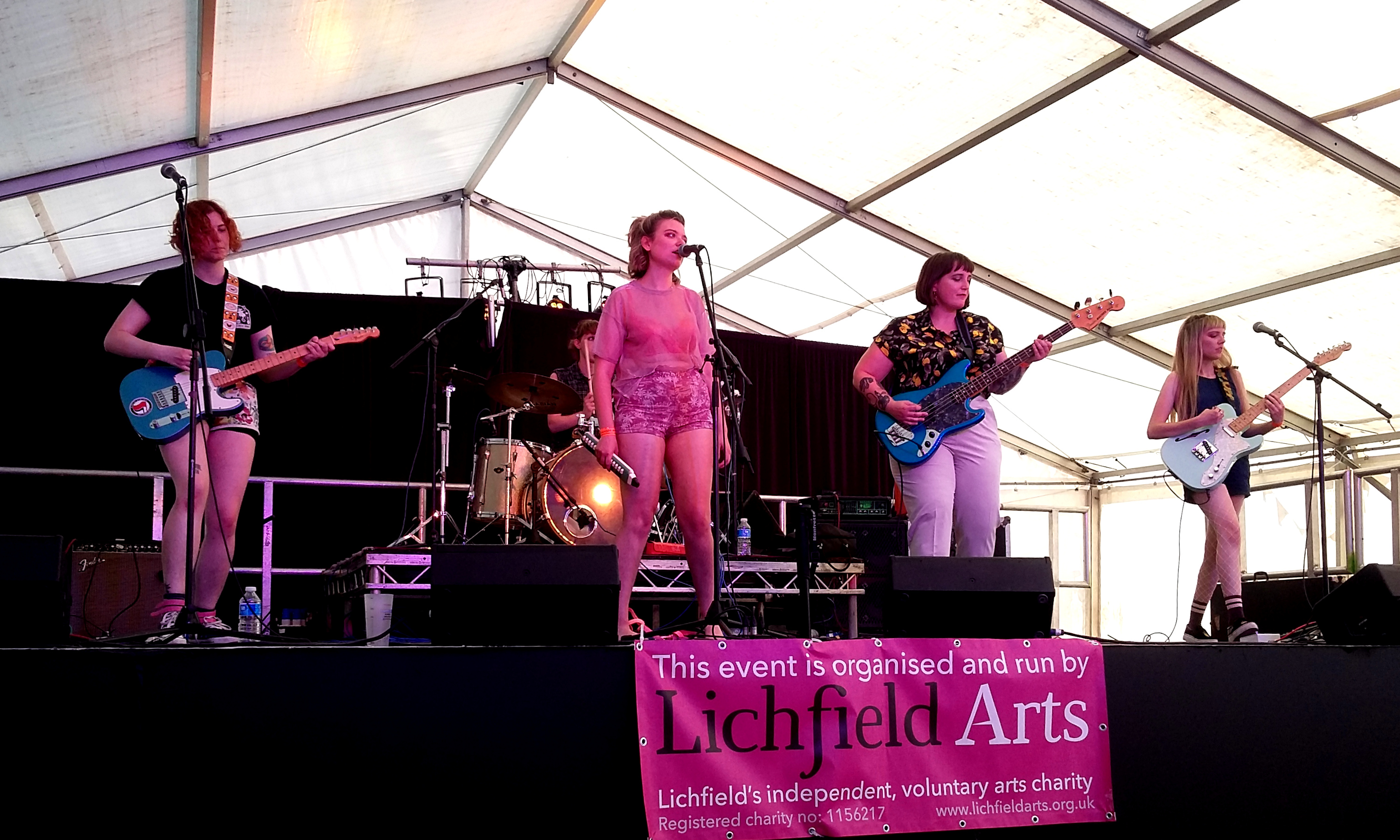

Background information
- Origin: Hillingdon, London, England
- Genres: Indie pop, punk
- Years active: 2007–present
- Labels: Dovetown; Krod Records; 2670 Records; Wiener Records; American Laundromat; Rizkan Records
- Members: Jen Doveton; Harriet Doveton; Jodi M Burn; Laura Ankles
- Past members: Helen Meragi; Danny Gardner; Sam Brackley; Carmela Pietrangelo
- Website: CMW bandcamp

Colour Me Wednesday are an English indie pop/pop punk band from West London, England, built around sisters Jen and Harriet Doveton. The band are noted for their melodic guitar pop, politicised lyrics and DIY punk method, including producing their own recordings, artwork and promotional videos.

== History ==
Colour Me Wednesday formed in Uxbridge in 2007, initially performing local gigs with various line-ups, and settled as a permanent band in 2009, with Danny Gardner on bass and Sam Brackley on drums. Brackley had previously played bass, with Helen Meragi on drums. They self-recorded and self-released their debut CDr EP What to do in an Emergency that year.

In 2010 and 2011, a series of self-produced YouTube videos for tracks from their follow up Sampler EP brought them to wider attention in DIY punk and indiepop circles.

In 2012, Carmela Pietrangelo (of ¡Ay Carmela!) joined as new bassist. In June, the band released debut single "Shut" as a digital download with accompanying video, taken from the album I Thought It Was Morning, released by Discount Horse Records in July and described by The Girls Are as "an exceptionally assured debut"; the album was self-recorded and included new versions of EP tracks as well as a collaboration with former King Blues keyboardist and solo artist Perkie. A promo video for the track "(I'm Not Coming To Your) BBQ" accompanied the release of the album, which was re-released in Japan and Canada the following year; "Shut" was also issued on vinyl in Canada. The same year, the band was invited to play the Indietracks festival in 2012 and subsequently the following year in 2013.

2014 saw the band release a split album with Spoonboy on California's Lauren Records, supported by a US tour including appearances at Plan-It X festival and New York Popfest. A promo video was released for lead track "Sugar-Coated".

In 2015, Colour Me Wednesday made a return to the Indietracks festival, joined by new drummer Jodi M Burn and guitarist Laura Ankles (both also of ¡Ay Carmela!). This line-up released its first recordings in 2016 as the Anyone and Everyone EP, available on multiple formats in the UK, US, France and Japan (as part of 2670 Records' Incompatible compilation). The EP was supported by a UK and European tour and a promotional video for lead track "Don't Tell Anyone"; the group also played at Madrid Popfest.

In 2017, Colour Me Wednesday band toured with Lemuria. They have also played with Waxahatchee, Laura Stevenson, Kate Nash, Grace Petrie, Doe, LVL UP, the Homosexuals, Thee Faction and Josie Long. Also in 2017 they released a new track online, a version of Demi Lovato's "Cool for the Summer". Later that year their debut album was reissued in Indonesia.

In 2018, Colour Me Wednesday released second album Counting Pennies in the Afterlife, produced by MJ of Hookworms. Preview single "Sunriser" was released in May with an accompanying video. Additionally, a single of the previously released "Don't Tell Anyone" and new b-side "Blossom" was released in April on U.S. label American Laundromat.

== Style and influences ==
Colour Me Wednesday have been likened musically to contemporary artists such as Lemuria and Waxahatchee and older indie bands such as the Sundays, the Popguns, the Breeders and Blake Babies, and lyrically to ONSIND as well as earlier political new wave/indie bands such as the Clash, the Jam and the Housemartins.

== Members ==
Current

- Jen Doveton – lead vocals, melodica (2007–present)
- Harriet Doveton – guitar, bass, backing vocals (2007–present)
- Laura Ankles – bass, guitar, backing vocals (2015–present)
- Jodi M Burn – drums, percussion (2015–present)

Former

- Carmela Pietrangelo – bass (2012–2015)
- Danny Gardner – bass (2009–12)
- Sam Brackley – drums, keyboards, horns (2009–2015), bass (2007–2009)
- Helen Meragi – drums (2007–2009)

== Discography ==
=== Singles/EPs ===
- What to do in an Emergency EP, CDr, 2009 [self released]
- Sampler EP, CDr, 2011 [self released]
- "Shut" b/w "What Happened" 7", Kingfisher Bluez, 2014
- Anyone and Everyone EP, CDr/7"/Cass/DD, Dovetown/Krod Records/Wiener Records, 2016
- "Don't Tell Anyone" b/w "Blossom" 7" (Pink & White Marble Vinyl), American Laundromat Records, 2018

=== Albums ===
- I Thought It Was Morning, LP/CD/DD, Discount Horse/Dovetown, 2013; CD/Cass, 2670 Records/Bitter Melody records, 2014 [extra track]
- Counting Pennies in the Afterlife, 2018

==== Compilations ====
- Incompatible, CD/DD, 2670 Records, 2016 [combines tracks from 2014 split LP and 2016 EP]

=== Compilation appearances ===
- "What Happened" on Nobody’s Business, LP/DD, Candy Twist Records, 2014
- Split [w/Spoonboy], LP/CD/Cass/DD, Lauren Records/Dovetown, 2014
- "Not My Turf" on Hell Hath No Fury, Vol. 2, CD/DD, Hell Hath No Fury Records, 2018
