= Steamer Company Number 5 =

- U.S. National Register of Historic Places
- Virginia Landmarks Register
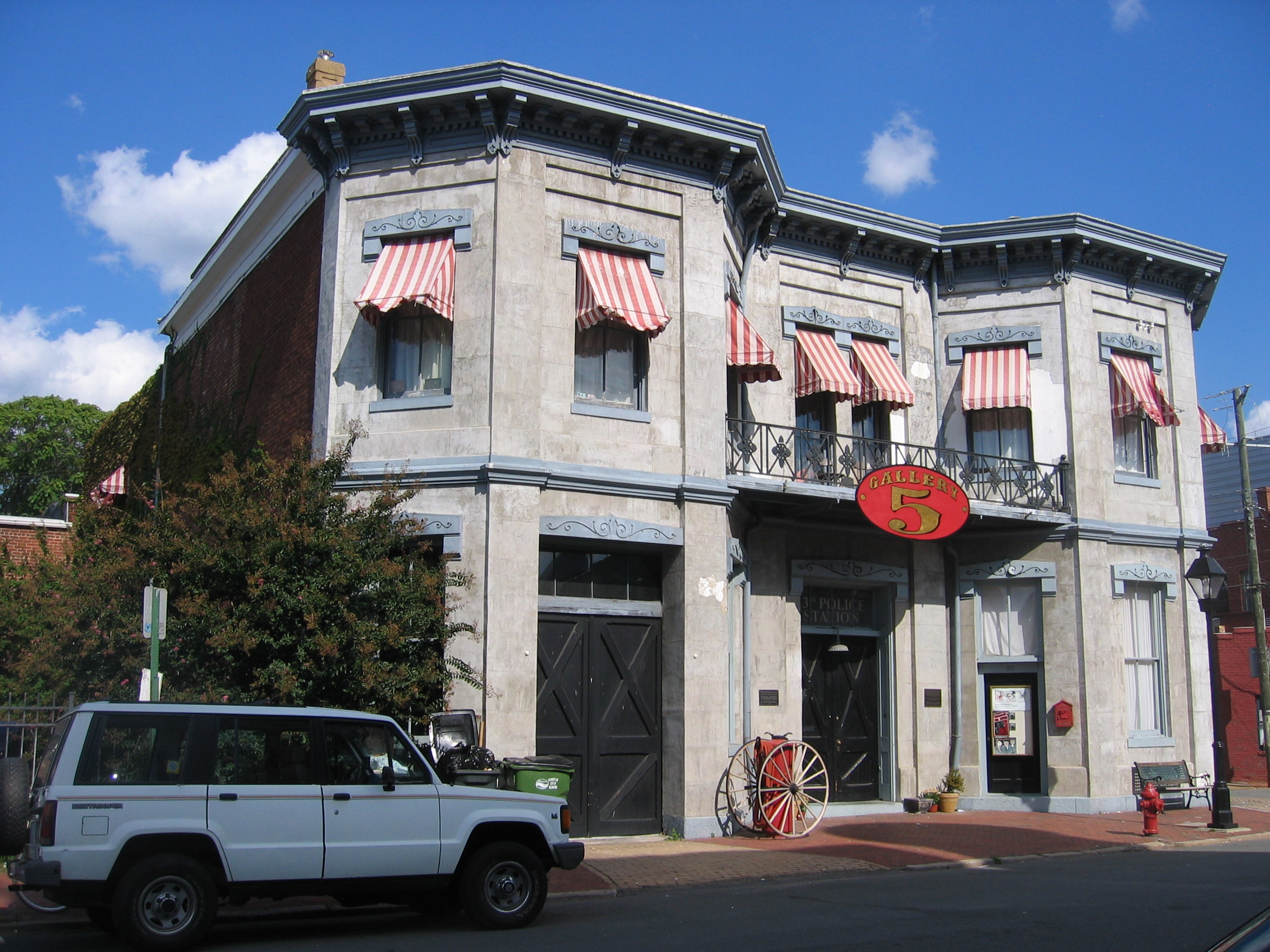

- Location within Virginia Location within the United States
- Location: 200 W. Marshall St., Richmond, Virginia
- Coordinates: 37°32′51″N 77°26′36″W
- Area: less than one acre
- Built: 1883
- Architectural style: Italianate
- NRHP reference No.: 95000027
- VLR No.: 127-0370

Significant dates
- Added to NRHP: February 8, 1995
- Designated VLR: October 19, 1994

Steamer Company Number 5 is a former Richmond fire station located at 200 West Marshall Street in Richmond, Virginia.

Designed by Richmond City Engineer Wilfred Emory Cutshaw, the building has a triangular plan to conform to the shape of its lot at the intersection of Brook Road and Marshall Street. Constructed of brick on a foundation of granite ashlar and covered with stucco which was scored to simulate stone, Steamer Company Number 5 is a late example of the Italianate style. This is a decorative fashion the building shares with many houses in the surrounding Jackson Ward area it served as firehouse from 1883 to 1968.

Built in 1883 to continue the function of fire fighting and police station for the Jackson Ward neighborhood begun in 1849 by a previous building on the site, Steamer Company Number 5 combines the unique local form of two-bow-front houses with municipal functionality. The late use of the Italianate style is typical of municipal schools and other buildings constructed by the city during the period. The style can be observed as late as 1896, in Richmond's Randolph Street School.

The building is now home to Virago Alley, a nonprofit focused on preserving historical martial arts and artisan trades, and organizer of the Richmond Ren Faire, as well as Gallery 5, an arts center, and was the former home of the Virginia Fire & Police Museum, which covered Virginia fire and police history with collections include antique fire apparatus, historic photos, and artifacts dating from 1790 to the present.
