= Dream Nails =

English DIY punk/riot grrrl band

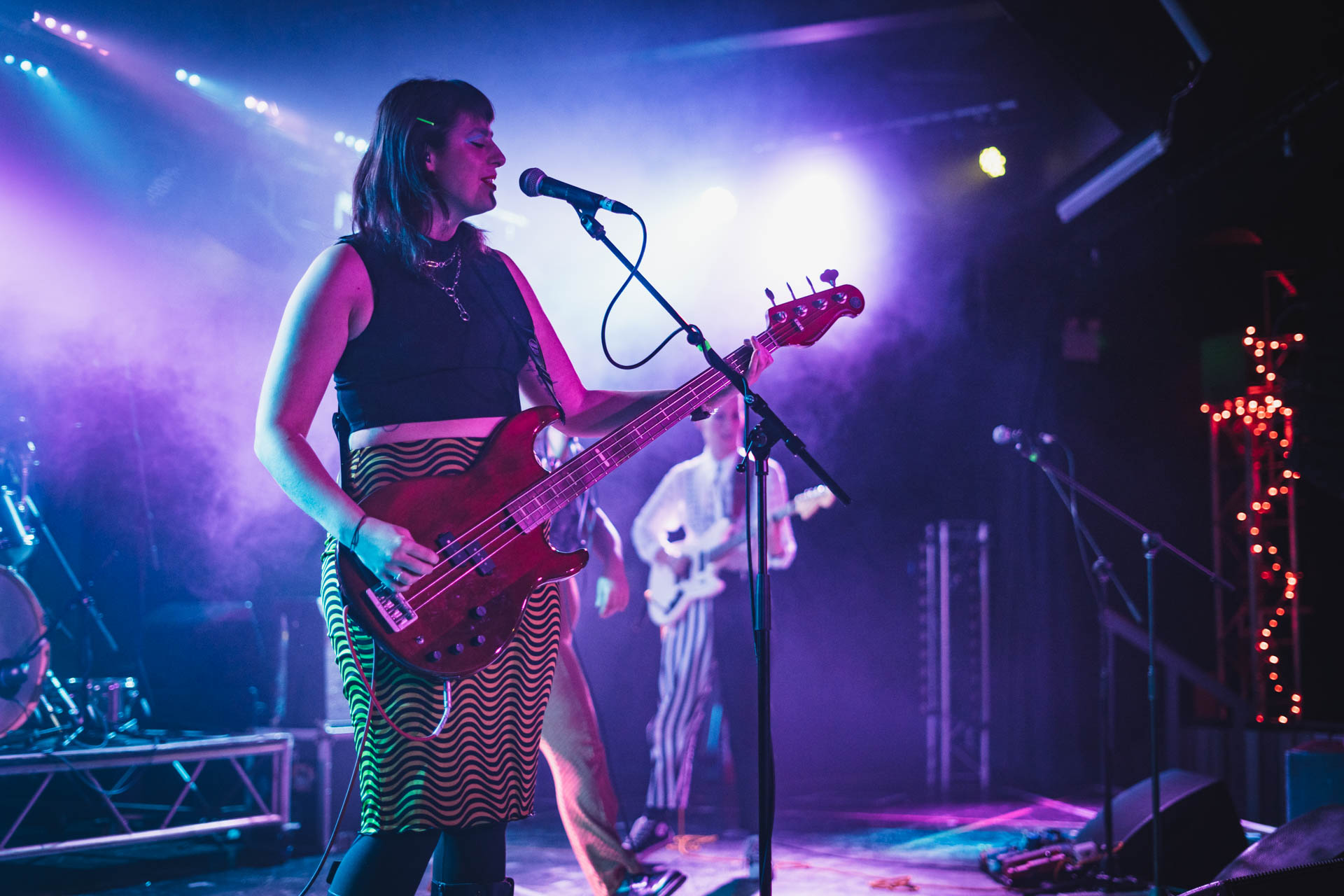

Background information
- Origin: London, England
- Genre: Punk rock • riot grrrl • queercore
- Labels: Marshall Records; Alcopop! Records; Krod Records; Everything Sucks Records
- Members: Anya Pearson; Lucy Katz; Mimi Jasson
- Past members: Ishmael Kirby; Janey Starling; Judith Dawson; Emmett Roberts; Katherine Christie Evans

Dream Nails is an English punk/riot grrrl band from London founded in 2015.

== History ==
Dream Nails was founded in London in August 2015 by Janey Starling, singer, and Anya Pearson, guitarist. The two friends met through their involvement with feminist activism and brought fellow activist Emmett Roberts on board to play bass and Judith Dawson on drums. In early 2016, Lucy Katz replaced Judith on drums. Within one year of performing together they were invited to perform at Glastonbury's Sisterhood stage – the first women-only venue at the festival.

In 2017, Katherine Christie Evans briefly replaced Roberts on bass and backing vocals, replaced in turn by Mimi Jasson.

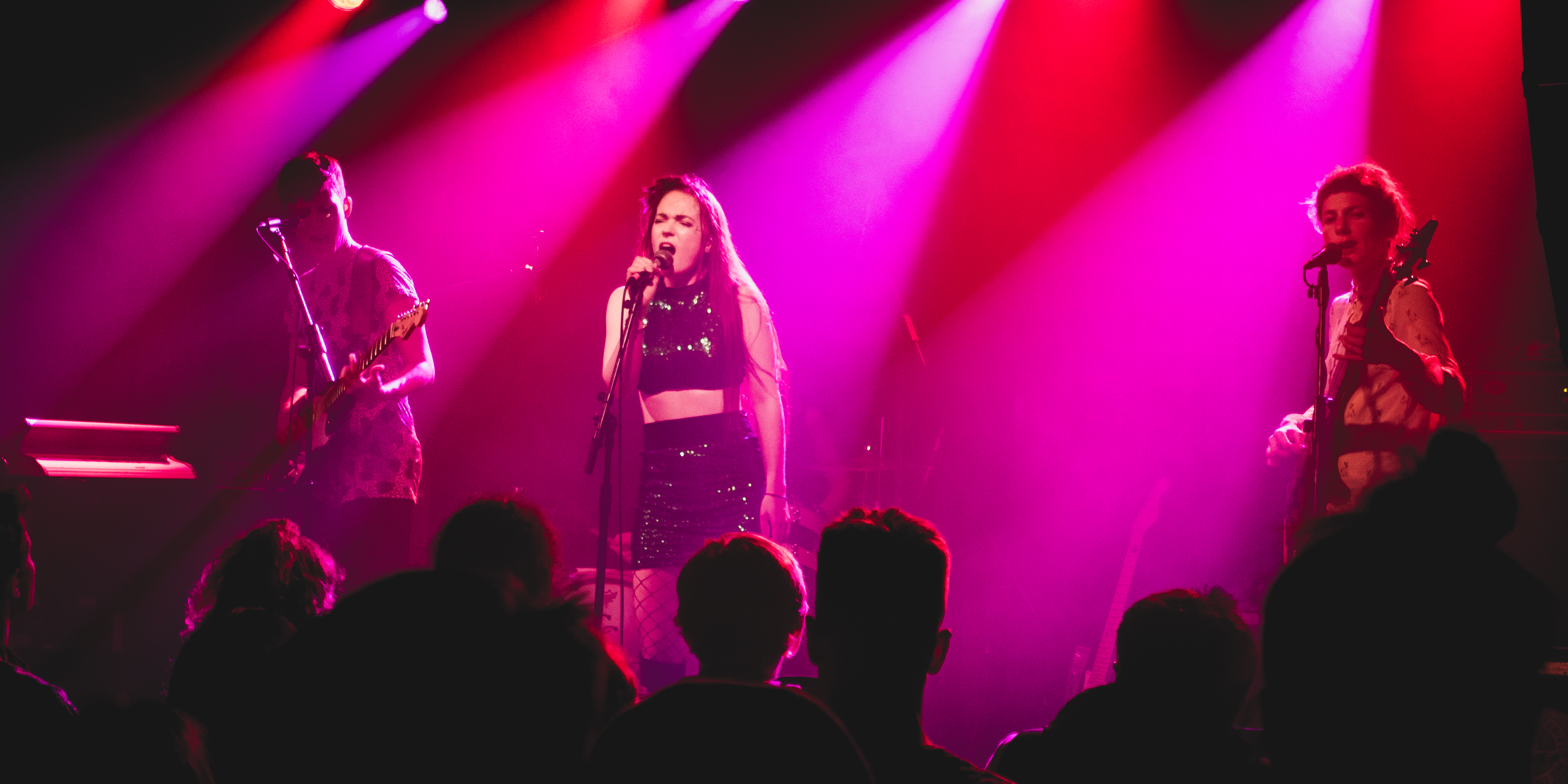
Dream Nails at The Garage in London in 2017

Dream Nails identify themselves as punk witches and their genre as "witch punk". They claim to write "hexes, not songs" and are best known for their "hex on misogynist politicians" Deep Heat. The group's first single was released with a video premiered on Nylon, in time for the 2016 election of the United States of American's president, Donald Trump.

Their first EP, DIY was released in April 2016 with a handmade zine and enjoyed immediate attention from Dazed and Confused. After embarking on short tours in Belgium, the Netherlands and Austria, Dream Nails were invited to be the main support for American band Cherry Glazerr on their European tour in spring 2017. A second EP Dare to Care followed in 2017. A live album Take Up Space - a recording of an acoustic performance at Housmans Bookshop - was released in early 2019.

In August 2020 the band released their self-titled first album on Alcopop! Records.

On 30 April 2021, co-founder and frontwoman Janey Starling announced her departure from the band.

In July 2022 the band played a British Summer Time concert in Hyde Park, opening for Pixies

In 2023, the band signed to Marshall Records. In October 2023, the band released their second studio album 'Doom Loop', recorded with new vocalist Ishmael Kirby, on Marshall Records to critical acclaim. Doom Loop was recorded and produced in Sheffield by producer Ross Orton. They announced an in-store tour, playing record stores across the UK, and a 16-date headline tour across the UK and the EU. 'Doom Loop' ranked at #37 on Kerrang's "50 Best Albums of 2023"

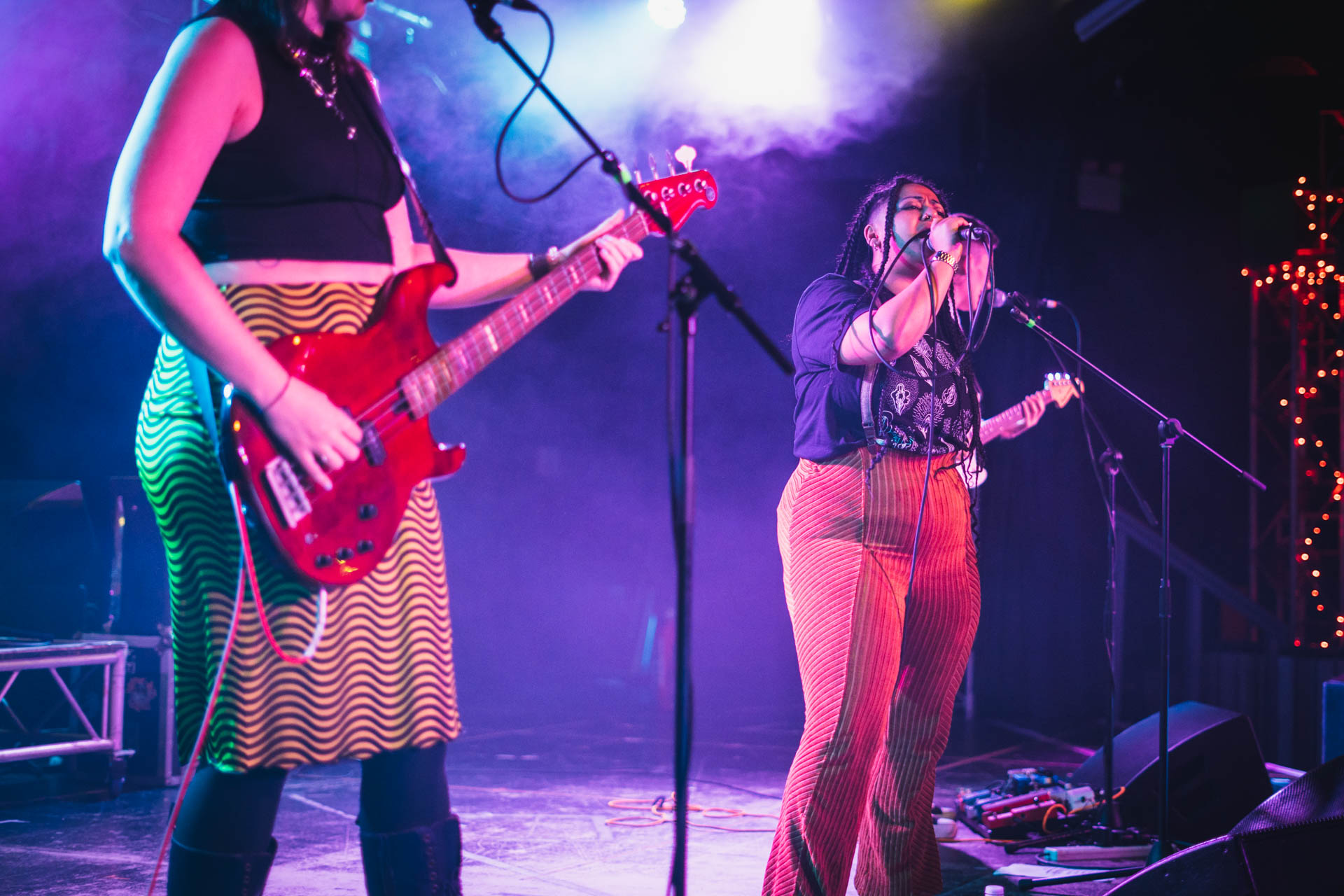
Dream Nails at Rockaway Beach Festival in 2023

== Discography ==
=== Singles ===
- Deep Heat, DL, Self release (2016) and Krod Records (2017)
- Tourist, DL, Krod Records (2017)
- Vagina Police / Fascism Is Coming, 7"/DL, Everything Sucks Music (2018)
- Corporate Realness, 7"/DL, Alcopop! Records (UK) / Firebrand Records (US) (2019)
- Text Me Back (Chirpse Degree Burns), DL, Alcopop! Records (2020)

=== Extended plays ===
- DIY EP, CD/DL, Self release (2016)
- Dare to Care EP, CD/DL, Krod Records (2017)

=== Albums ===
- Dream Nails, LP, CD, DL, Alcopop! Records (2020)
- Doom Loop, Marshall Records (2023)
- You Wish, Marshall Records (2026)

=== Live albums ===
- Take Up Space, DL (2019)

=== Compilation appearances ===
- Loud Women: Volume One, CD, 2017
- Femrock Mixtape, 2017
- Girls go BOOM Mixtape #1, 2017
