= The Deadnotes =

German pop punk band

- Origin: Freiburg, Germany
- Genres: rock Indie rock
- Labels: 22Lives Records Odyssey Music Fleet Union Grand_Hotel_van_Cleef Krod Records Smithsfoodgroup Diy LaserLife Records Sugarferry Records
- Members: Darius Lohmüller Jakob Walheim

The Deadnotes are a rock band from Freiburg in Germany founded in 2011 by Jakob Walheim (bassist) and Darius Lohmüller (guitarist). They asked their friend Yannic Arens to join the band as a drummer. The Deadnotes have toured Europe extensively and released two full length records. Since 2018 the band runs their own independent record label 22Lives Records.

== Biography ==
The Deadnotes are a rock band from Freiburg in Germany founded in 2011 by Jakob Walheim (bassist) and Darius Lohmüller (guitarist). They asked their childhood friend Yannic Arens to join the band as a drummer.

In 2013, the band released their debut EP Smiling Faces and started their first European tour in October.

In 2014, the band recorded a single Broken Thumbs & Sleepless Nights at Proudly Ugly Studio in Freiburg in Germany. The Deadnotes played several shows all over Europe (Spain, Portugal, Denmark, The Netherlands, United Kingdom, Czech Republic, Slovenia).

In 2015, the band toured in Russia and Ukraine for 19 days in October and November. That same year they released a split with the band Casually Dressed called A Long Way Split.

In 2016, the band toured in Scandinavia and played their longest tour to date in July and August, including some shows with the American band Such Gold. The Deadnotes released their debut album I'll Kiss All Fears Out Of Your Face through Krod Records, Smithsfoodgroup Diy, Laserlife Records and Sugarferry Records and tours over Germany, Switzerland, France and Austria to promote this album.

In 2017, the band toured with Beach Slang in Germany and in March, embarked on a tour with Smile and Burn.

== Discography ==
=== Singles ===
- Broken Thumbs & Sleepless Nights, DL, 2014
- 1.20, DL, 2017
- Cling to You, DL, 2018
- Makeup, DL, 2019
- Hopeless Romantic, DL, 2019
- Never Perfect, DL, 2020
- Ghost on the Ceiling, DL, 2020
- Easy Summer, DL, 2021
- Deer in the Headlights, DL 2021
- Cerf Pris Dans Les Phares, DL 2022
- Downward Spiral, DL 2022
- Forever Outsider, DL 2023
- A Glade Inside The Vines, DL 2023
- Flowers, DL, 2023
- Reservoir, DL, 2024
- Jesus Christ! (I'm Sick And Tired Of Falling In Love, DL, 2024
- Show Me What Love Is, DL, 2025

=== Albums/Eps ===
- Smiling Faces, CD/DL, 2013
- A Long Way Split with Casually Dressed, CD/DL, Sugarferry Records, 2015
- I'll Kiss All Fears Out Of Your Face, CD/LP/DL, Krod Records, Smithsfoodgroup Diy, Laserlife Records, Sugarferry Records, 2016
- Courage 2020
- Easy Summer / Deer in the Headlights 7'' Vinyl 2020
- Forever Outsider EP 12" Vinyl 2023
- Rock 'n' Roll Saviour (Grand Hotel van Cleef, 2025)
