= Jan Showers =

American interior designer (born 1942)

Jan Showers (born 1942) is an American interior designer. She is also the owner and proprietor of a showroom in the Dallas Design District where she curates and sells antiques purchased on buying trips to Paris, New York, London and Venice. In January 2014, Architectural Digest named Jan Showers & Associates to the AD100 list of top design & architecture firms. Showers operates the Jan Showers Collection, a line of high-end luxury furnishings. In 2009, Abrams Books published Glamorous Rooms, a book about Showers' perspectives and ideas about interior design. Glamorous Rooms is in its eighth printing. In October 2013, Showers's second book, Glamorous Retreats showcases the designer's most luxurious interiors. Veranda magazine has called Showers' style "glamour without pretense".

== Personal life ==
Jan Showers was born in Hillsboro, TX. In interviews she has discussed the influence of both her mother and her grandmother in the early development of her style and taste. In an interview with Southern Accents she said, “My mother was a huge influence on my career―she had a good eye and good taste. She constantly told me, ‘Strive for perfection. Details matter.’’

She received a Bachelor of Science in Business from Texas Christian University in 1963. Showers married James Andrew Showers, an attorney, in 1961 with whom she has two daughters, Susanna Showers Moldawer and Elizabeth Tolbert Showers. Elizabeth is a Dallas-based jewelry designer and Susanna a writer, stylist and mother of three. Showers and her husband divide their time between a country house and Dallas, TX.

== Interior design ==
Showers learned her craft as, throughout the 1960s, she took small jobs designing houses for friends and relatives. In 1977, she formalized the first incarnation of her business identity with Jan Showers Interiors, which was changed to Jan Showers & Associates in 1996.

Showers has decorated houses in the United States and Canada, including projects in Palm Beach, Aspen, San Francisco, Nantucket and Toronto.

Showers has mentioned as inspirations the decorators Billy Baldwin, Francis Elkins and David Hicks. To Southern Accents she described Billy Baldwin as such: “He embodied clean, simple glamour―such wonderful understatement. I love the living room he did for Mary Wells Lawrence at La Fiorentina in the south of France―those blue sofas and French woven blue-and-white rugs will be forever in my memory.”

Her work has been published and photographed extensively, in such magazines as Architectural Digest, Elle Décor, Veranda, Traditional Home, Southern Accents and Western Interiors.

Named as one of the top designers by both House Beautiful and Western Interiors, Ms. Showers also won the Lifetime Achievement Award in Interior Design from Fashion Group International in 2008.

She has been honored by the Andrew Martin Interior Design Awards twice, in 2004 and 2005.

== Storefronts ==
In 1994, Showers partnered with clients to open Out of Africa, her first retail storefront. The store, located in Dallas, featured African art mixed with traditional furnishings.

Showers opened her own boutique and showroom in the Dallas Design District, which more-than-doubled in size over the next 10 years. Well known for mixing 18th and 19th century designs with mid 20th century pieces, Showers curates and sells furnishings and design accessories from a variety of locales purchased. The contents of the showroom are acquired by Showers on semiannual buying trips to Paris, Venice, London, and New York City. Architectural Digest featured her showroom, saying, “In every vignette there’s at least one mirror.…….It’s airy and has the same glamour as the movies of the 1940s.”

== Furniture collection ==
Unable to consistently find the kind of furnishings she and her clients wanted, Showers established a furniture collection in 1999. Within 2 years, she was represented by 7 showrooms across the United States. The Collection is currently featured in Los Angeles, New York, San Francisco, Dallas, Houston, Atlanta, and Dania. The Jan Showers Collection consists of over 150 pieces, including a variety of furnishings as well as Murano glass lighting. Veranda said “ The collection reflects the designer’s affinity for Neoclassicism and mid-century modern design.”

== Additional design work ==
In 2005, Jan Showers was asked to design a limited edition collection of seven different glass accessories, signed and numbered for Neiman Marcus. They were produced in Murano, Italy.

Showers designed a collection of custom made cowhide rugs for Kyle Bunting in 2010. and in 2014 Showers designed a ceramic lighting collection in collaboration with ceramist Paul Schneider, as well as a collection of Oushak rugs for Moattar, Ltd.

Jan Showers, Carleton Varney (Dorothy Draper) and Laura Hunt designed showhouses for the Robert A.M. Stern Residences at the Ritz Carlton Dallas in the spring of 2010

== Publishing ==
In 2009, Abrams Books published Glamorous Rooms, a photography-centered book featuring Showers’ design projects and emphasizing her attention to detail, and her trademark blending of Hollywood high style, mid-century modernism and classic pieces from the 18th and 19th centuries. American fashion designer Michael Kors wrote the foreword for the book. Kors said, “What impresses Jan isn’t what looks hot right this second, but what will look great years from now. I find this focus on timelessness is likewise utterly apparent in the rooms she creates. The fact that they will still look amazing decades from now speaks to her real success as a designer.”

Abrams published her second book, Glamorous Retreats, in fall of 2013, which will feature vacation/second homes from Palm Beach, Nantucket, Vail, Telluride, Malibu and Toronto, as well as many other locales.

== Philanthropy ==
Showers serves on the board of trustees of the Dallas Museum of Art. In 2009, Showers co-chaired Two X Two with her daughter, Elizabeth Showers, a gala benefitting AmfAR and the Dallas Museum of Art. She also has served on the board of The Elisa Project, an organization dedicated to promoting healthy body image.
