= Anyone and Everyone =

EP by Colour Me Wednesday
- Released: 30 March 2016
- Studio: Dovetown Recordings; Wingrove Farm (both Uxbridge, United Kingdom)
- Genre: Pop punk
- Label: Dovetown, Krod Records, Wierner Records

Colour Me Wednesday chronology
| Spoonboy + Colour Me Wednesday Split (2014) | Anyone and Everyone (2016) |

Anyone and Everyone is an EP from the pop punk band Colour Me Wednesday. This EP was released on digital platforms and CD on 30 March 2016 and on vinyl 7 inch through Dovetown and Krod Records on 12 July 2016. Wiener Records made a tape version of this EP. It was recorded at Dovetown Recordings and at Wingrove Farm in the United Kingdom. It was mixed and mastered by Luke Yates.

== Track listing ==
1. "Don't Tell Anyone" – 03:18
2. "Two-Fifty For You Girls" – 03:19
3. "Horror Story" – 01:56
4. "In Your Shoes" – 03:57

== Personnel ==
- Jennifer Doveton – vocals and synth
- Harriet Doveton – guitar and vocals
- Carmela Pietrangelo – bass
- Ben Wingrove – sax
- Jaca Freer – drums
