= Operation: Broken Feather =

- Brooklyn Nine-Nine episode
- Episode no.: Season 1 Episode 15
- Directed by: Julie Anne Robinson
- Written by: Dan Goor; Michael Schur
- Cinematography by: Giovani Lampassi
- Editing by: Sandra Montiel
- Production code: 116
- Original air date: February 2, 2014
- Running time: 22 minutes

Guest appearances
- Adam Sandler as himself; Patton Oswalt as Fire Marshall Boone; Fred Armisen as Mlepnos; Joe Theismann as himself; Dean Winters as Keith "The Vulture" Pembroke; Dirk Blocker as Michael Hitchcock; Joel McKinnon Miller as Norm Scully

Episode chronology
← Previous "The Ebony Falcon"	Next → "The Party"
- Brooklyn Nine-Nine season 1

"Operation: Broken Feather" is the fifteenth episode of the first season of the American television police sitcom series Brooklyn Nine-Nine. It was written by series creators Dan Goor and Michael Schur and directed by Julie Anne Robinson, it aired on Fox in the United States on February 2, 2014. The episode was selected by Fox to be broadcast, along with New Girl, after Super Bowl XLVIII. The episode was the sixteenth in the series to be produced but the fifteenth to be broadcast.

In the episode, Peralta and Santiago go after a hotel robber who has been stealing furniture from the hotel. During the mission, Peralta discovers that Santiago is considering going to Major Crimes. Thanks to Super Bowl viewers, the episode was seen by an estimated 15.07 million household viewers and gained a 6.9/18 ratings share among adults aged 18–49, according to Nielsen Media Research, making it the most watched episode of the show. The episode received positive reviews from critics, who praised the guest stars as well as the episode's Super Bowl-related plot.

== Plot ==
After playing a game of football against the fire department, Jake Peralta (Andy Samberg) is notified that a suspect he has caught is going to be handed over to Major Crimes. Therefore, Keith "The Vulture" Pembroke (Dean Winters) is going to claim the case. With the help of the precinct, Peralta gets the suspect's murder confession before the Vulture does.

Raymond Holt (Andre Braugher) and Terry Jeffords (Terry Crews) conduct experiments to reduce the precinct's inefficiencies, hoping to reach their CompStat deadline. Their attempt distracting and relocating members of the squad to increase their efficiency goes awry, however. Ultimately, the precinct is unhappy with Holt and Jeffords's actions after Boyle (Joe Lo Truglio) ends up setting himself on fire due to a misplaced toaster oven. Gina Linetti (Chelsea Peretti) manages to convince Holt and Jeffords to abandon the idea.

Peralta and Amy Santiago (Melissa Fumero) are then assigned to investigate a hotel that had its rooms robbed. During a stakeout, Peralta learns that Santiago has been offered a transfer to Major Crimes, which upsets him. They manage to identify an attendee of the antiquities auction in the hotel as the perp. Peralta gets into a verbal conflict with Adam Sandler at the auction and ends up injuring Joe Theismann – who is attending the auction – by accidentally breaking his leg when tackling the perp. After being scolded by Holt, Peralta decides to apologize to Santiago. Nevertheless, she reveals that she turned down the offer. The episode ends as they retaliate against the Vulture by tricking him into holding a container of tear gas.

== Production ==
"Operation: Broken Feather" was written by series creators Dan Goor and Michael Schur and directed by Julie Anne Robinson. It was the sixteenth episode to be produced but the fifteenth to be broadcast.

== Release ==
=== Broadcast ===
"Operation: Broken Feather" was first aired in the United States on Fox on February 2, 2014. The episode followed New Girl as part of Super Bowl XLVIII lead-out programs. In its original American broadcast, "Operation: Broken Feather" was seen by an estimated 15.07 million household viewers and gained a 6.9/18 ratings share among adults aged 18–49, according to Nielsen Media Research. This was a 231% increase in viewership from the previous episode, which was watched by 4.55 million viewers with a 1.9/5 in the 18–49 demographics. This means that 6.9 percent of all households with televisions watched the episode, while 18 percent of all households watching television at that time watched it. With these ratings, Brooklyn Nine-Nine was the third most watched show on FOX for the night, behind New Girl and Super Bowl XLVIII. "Operation: Broken Feather" is the highest viewed episode of the first season of Brooklyn Nine-Nine, followed by the series premier "Pilot". Additionally it is the highest rated episode of the series as a whole. (Note: Attributed to multiple references:)

=== Critical reviews ===
"Operation: Broken Feather" received positive reviews from critics. Roth Cornet of IGN gave the episode a "great" 8.5 out of 10 and wrote: "'Operation: Broken Feather' was a guest star-packed episode, but still managed to put the spotlight on two of the show's central relationships. The appearances from Oswalt, Sandler, and crew made for moments of hilarity, but the rapid-fire inclusions meant that none of the guests truly had the time to shine. This post-Bowl special still managed to deliver on the core strengths of the series, though. What's great about Brooklyn Nine-Nine is that, without putting to fine a point on it, these characters continue to grow in ways that make sense and yet surprise us."

Molly Eichel of The A.V. Club gave the episode a "B" grade and wrote, "This plot was worth it for the journey, with a letdown of an ending: Gina's slow-clap discovery of their ruses. Yet, the ending paraded the defining character traits of each of those at the hands of Holt's meddling ways, establishing these people for the rookies who will hopefully tune in again on Tuesday. 'Operation: Broken Feather' was a solid way of saying, 'Y'all come back now, y'hear?'"

Alan Sepinwall of HitFix wrote, "And 'Operation: Broken Feather' continued the upswing in the material that Golden Globe Winner Andy Samberg is getting lately. He's still goofy and immature, but in a way that doesn't make you wonder how on earth this guy became and remains a cop. (Jake falling off the ladder while failing to dunk was the funniest non-Holt moment of the episode.) The writers have also done a good job of very slowly and carefully advancing the idea of Jake being attracted to Amy (and vice versa), so that it comes up when relevant and interesting, but isn't shoehorned into every episode and every moment so that no one in the audience could possibly miss the idea that they are destined to wind up together."
