= I'll Kiss All Fears Out of Your Face =

Studio album by The Deadnotes
- Released: October 7, 2016
- Studio: Proudly Ugly Studio, Freiburg, Germany
- Genre: Pop punk
- Label: Krod Records, Sugarferry Records, LaserLife Records, Smithsfoodgroup Diy
- Producer: Tiago Fernandes

The Deadnotes chronology
| A Long Way Split (2015) | I'll Kiss All Fears Out of Your Face (2016) | Courage (2020) |

I'll Kiss All Fears Out of Your Face is the debut album of the German pop punk band The Deadnotes. This album was released on October 7, 2016 on digital platforms, vinyl through Krod Records, LaserLife Records, Smithsfoodgroup Diy, Sugarferry Records and on CD. It was recorded at Proudly Ugly Studio in Freiburg in Germany by Tiago Fernandes.

== Track listing ==
1. "Favourite Shirts" – 4:19
2. "The 21st Century Blues" – 3:50
3. "All Tied Up" – 4:14
4. "Stay in Touch, Stay Forever" – 4:34
5. "Sad & Done" – 4:07
6. "Alive" – 3:03
7. "Boys & Girls" – 4:41
8. "Cardboard" – 3:52
9. "Vienna" – 3:12
10. "I'm A Dreamer (Homesick)" – 3:03
11. "Dead" – 4:04

== Personnel ==
- Darius Lohmüller – guitar, vocals
- Jakob Walheim – bass guitar, vocals
- Yannic Arens – drums
