= Shower (surname) =

Shower is a surname. Notable people with the name include:

- Bartholomew Shower (1658–1701), English lawyer and politician
- Jacob Shower (1803–1879), American politician
- John Shower (1657–1715), English nonconformist minister
- Kathy Shower (born 1953), American actress and nude model
- Mike Shower, American politician

== See also ==
- Showers (surname)
