= Prevent Alcohol and Risk Related Trauma in Youth =

Health promotion program

Prevent Alcohol and Risk Related Trauma in Youth (P.A.R.T.Y.) is an evidence-based international health promotion program. The model was initially developed in 1986 at the Sunnybrook Hospital in Ontario, Canada. It targets adolescents: an age group with a particularly high likelihood of sustaining trauma related to alcohol use and other high-risk behaviours in North America and countries around the world.

== Overview ==
Whereas the general model is grounded in health promotion theory and best practices, individual P.A.R.T.Y. programs generally run out of local hospitals, working closely with local law enforcement, education, mental health, emergency services, and other agencies to deliver relevant, evidence-based programming appropriate for each community.

In North America, P.A.R.T.Y often runs complementary to other community initiatives such as the DARE Program, which is aimed at a younger audience. Differences amongst individual P.A.R.T.Y. programs reflect cultural and geographical differences as well as statistical priorities (e.g., priorities can range from abnormally high levels of drinking and driving to excessive all-terrain vehicle injuries). In addition to programs in Eastern and Western Canada, for example, programs have been developed for aboriginal groups within Canada, as well as urban America, Australia, and Japan.
