= Shower (precipitation) =

Sudden and brief rain or snowfall

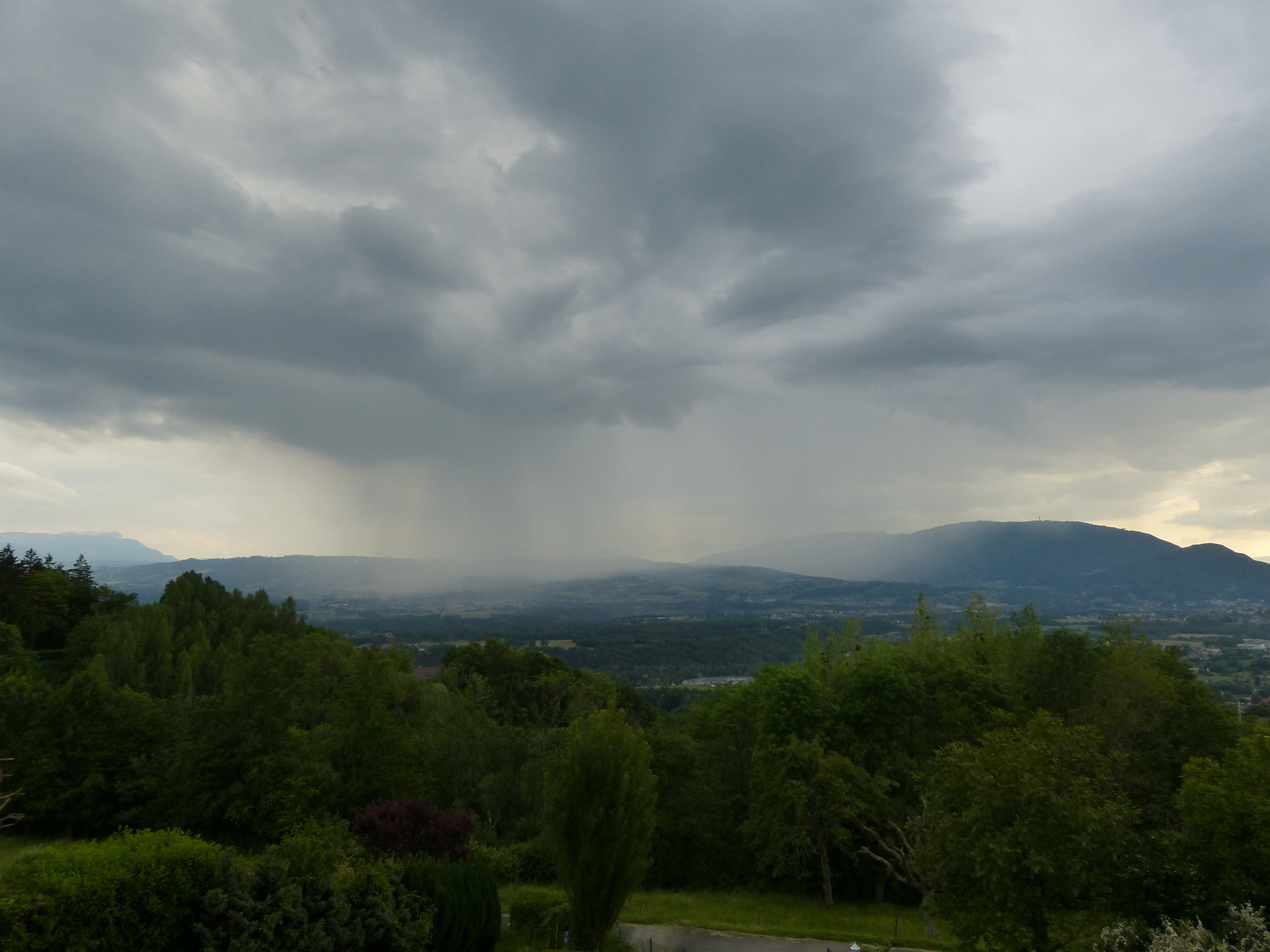
Shower in Reignier-Esery, Haute-Savoie, France.

A shower is a mode of precipitation characterized by an abrupt start and end, and by rapid variations in intensity. Often strong and short-lived, it comes from convective clouds, like cumulus congestus. A shower will produce rain if the temperature is above the freezing point in the cloud, or snow / ice pellets / snow pellets / hail if the temperature is below it at some point. In a meteorological observation, such as the METAR, they are noted SH giving respectively SHRA, SHSN, SHPL, SHGS and SHGR.

== Formation ==
Vertical motion of the air parcel with a given mixing ratio resulting into a convective cloud formation.

Convection occurs when the Earth's surface, especially within a conditionally unstable or moist atmosphere, becomes heated more than its surroundings and in turn leads to significant evaporation. The raised air parcel in a colder environment at altitude will cool, according to the adiabatic thermal gradient, forming clouds, and later precipitation above the lifted condensation level (LCL). Depending on the convective available potential energy (CAPE), the clouds will form in order: cumulus humilis, cumulus mediocris and then cumulus congestus, the latter giving short-lived precipitation of rain, snow or ice pellets changing in intensity, i.e. showers.

The life cycle of these clouds is fast because the updraft which forms them is most often cut off by the descent of precipitation. In addition, these clouds flow with atmospheric circulation and spend little time above a point on the ground. This explains the variations in intensity and the short duration of the showers. The type of precipitation will depend on the temperature structure in the cloud and below it:

- In winter, when the temperature in the cloud is below freezing (0 °C), snowflakes will be generated:
  - They will melt into raindrops if the temperature rises above freezing in a deep layer between the cloud and the ground. If the layer is not deep enough, it can produce snow pellet showers.
  - Or remain as snow showers, or flurry, if the temperature remains below freezing.
- On the other hand, raindrops might form in a strong updraft in a convective cloud, even at temperatures below freezing in the cloud (Supercooling) and freeze later, giving ice pellet showers.
- Finally, droplets can form and fall in an above-freezing layer in other seasons, giving rain showers.

=== Extreme ===
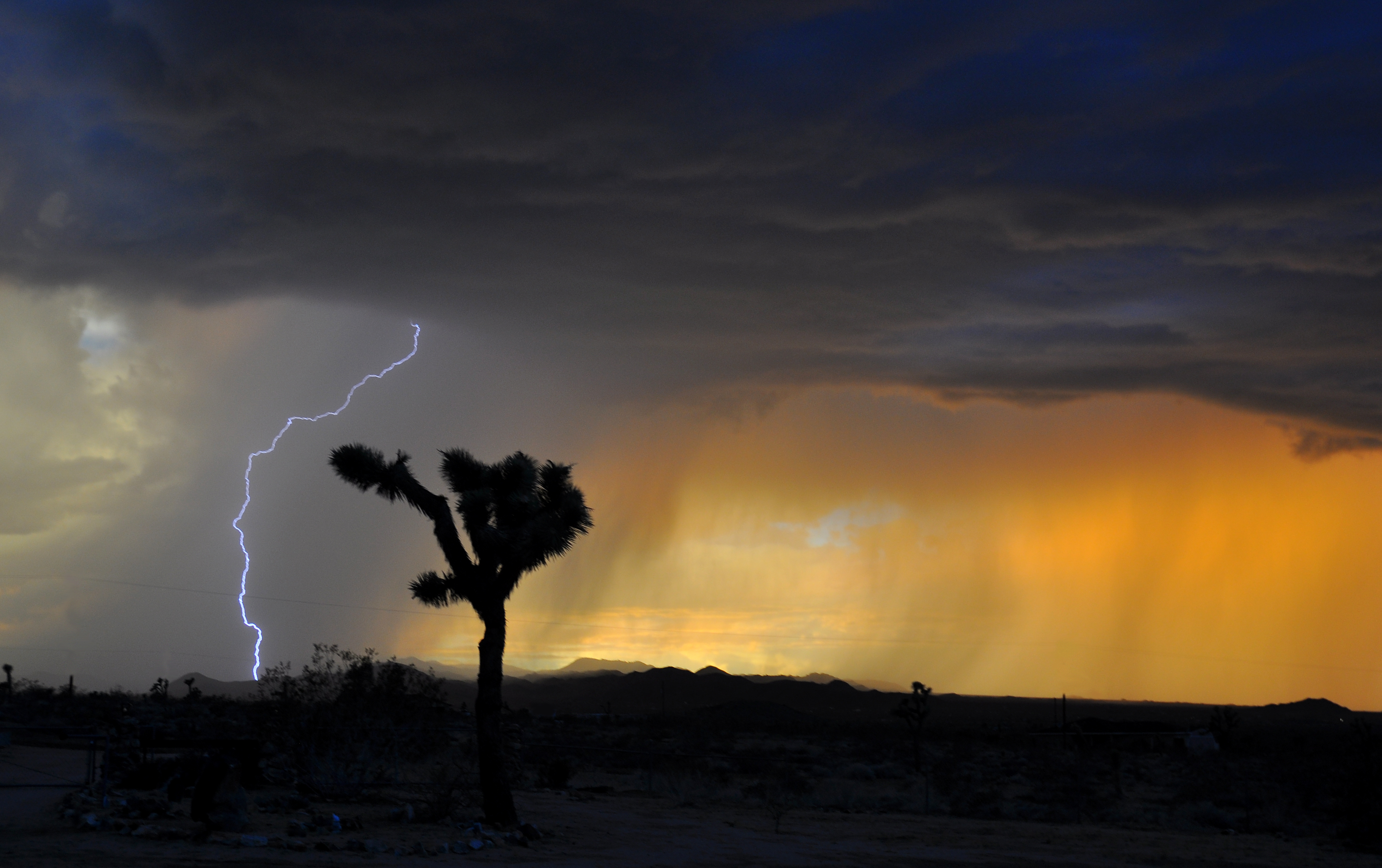
A violent electrical storm results from convective cumulonimbus above the LCL.

If the convection is more intense, it leads to the formation of cumulonimbus clouds, which have a very high vertical extent. The size of such clouds permits the displacement of electric charges from the bottom to the top, which produce lightning and its associated thunder. The showers associated with cumulonimbus clouds are therefore called thundershowers or thunderstorms, which, along with heavy rain, can also produce hail and other violent phenomena.

== Showery systems ==
Showers come from individual clouds as well as from groups of these. In mid-latitude regions, showers are often associated with cold fronts, often found along and behind them. However, they can be embedded into a continuous rain episode when a band of conditional symmetric instability is present in an otherwise stable air mass. They can also be part of large convection zones called mesoscale convective systems, such as a squall line.

== See also ==
- April shower
- Sunshower
