= Hightower (band) =

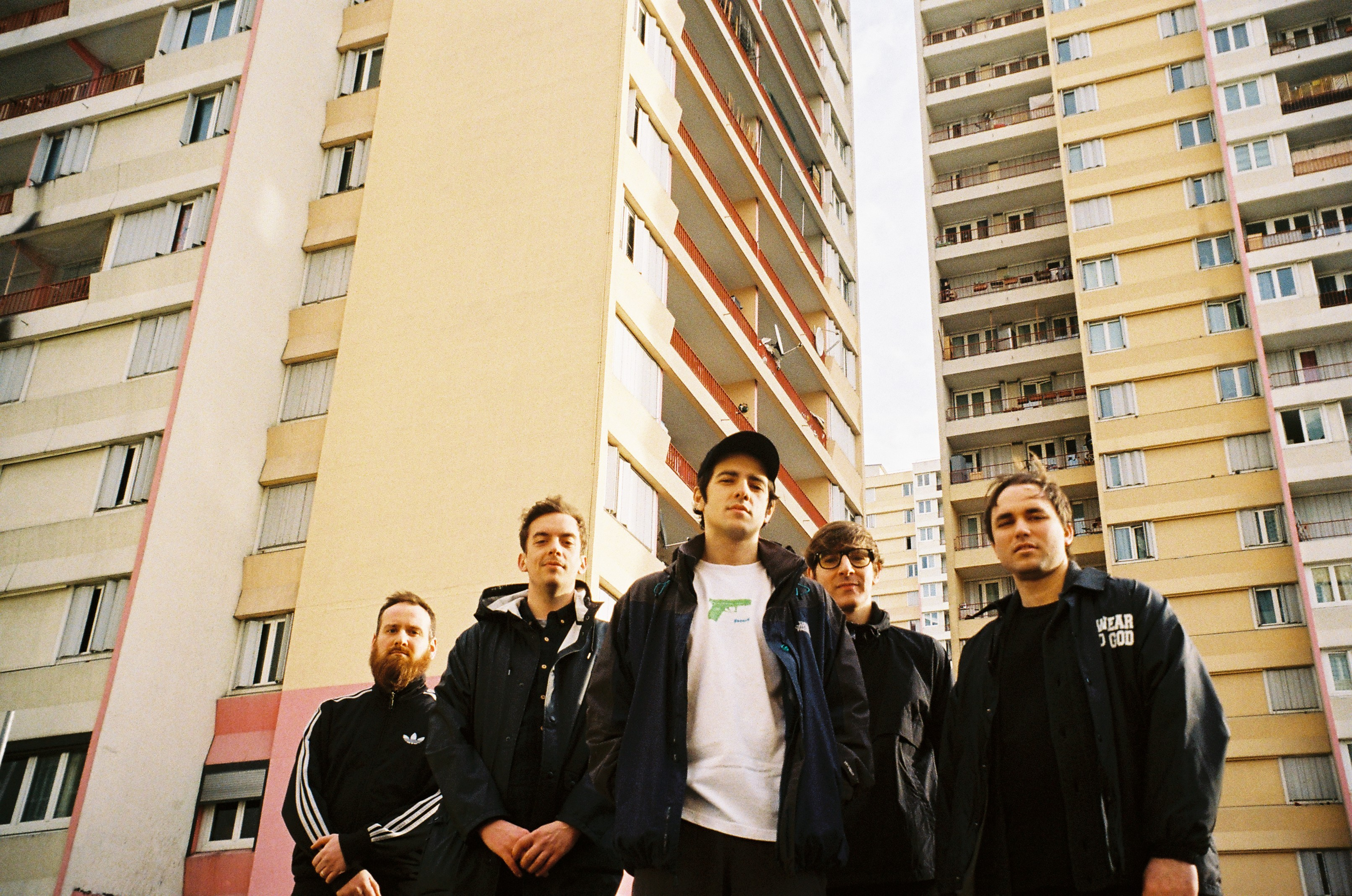

Background information
- Origin: Paris, France
- Genres: Punk rock
- Years active: 2013–2021
- Labels: Knives Out Records; Krod Records; Joe Cool Records
- Members: Romain Mariani; Jérémie Lombard; Alexis Calvi; Benjamin Dubois; Vincent Crespel
- Past members: Attila Racz

Hightower is a French punk rock band from Paris founded in 2013 by two cousins, Romain Mariani and Jeremie Lombard, who grew up listening to punk rock music from the 1990s. The band is notable for their combination of heavy vocals and intense melodies which create an original mix of energy and thrill.

== Biography ==
Hightower was founded in 2013 by Romain Mariani (drums) and Jeremie Lombard (guitar) . They were later joined by Alexis Calvi (bass), Benjamin Dubois (guitar) and Vincent Crespel (vocals)

In 2014, they recorded their debut album Sure. Fine. Whatever. at The Omen Room Studio in Los Angeles, California. The album was produced by Steve Evetts.

In 2015, their debut album Sure. Fine. Whatever. was released on vinyl and CD by Knives Out Records. In the same year, they toured Europe and UK to promote the record. They also played several shows in France, supporting US bands.

In late 2016, they recorded their second album "Club Dragon" with Steve Evetts at The Omen Room Studio with Attila Racz on vocals.

On May 9, 2017, they signed on Krod Records for the European release.

A first single entitled "The Party" was released on May 22 and the release of the album Club Dragon was planned for September 2017.

The band splits in 2021

== Discography ==
=== Singles ===
- "The Party", DL, Krod Records, 2017

=== Albums/Eps ===
- Sure. Fine. Whatever., LP/CD/DL, Knives Out Records, 2015
- Club Dragon, LP/CD/Tapes/DL, Krod Records/Joe Cool Records, 2017

=== Compilations ===
- ...Already Heard?, DL, No Panic Records, 2015
