= Parti (surname) =

Parti is a Hungarian surname. Notable people with the surname include:

- János Parti (1932–1998), Hungarian sprint canoeist
- Zoltán Parti (fl. 1970s), Hungarian sprint canoeist

== Other people ==
As a non-Hungarian surname, it can refer to:
