= Liberating Technologies =

Liberating Technologies, Inc.
- Founded: Holliston, Massachusetts (2001)
- Headquarters: United States
- Products: Prosthetics, artificial limbs

Liberating Technologies, Inc., better known as LTI, is a research and development company owned by Coapt, LLC and based in Holliston, Massachusetts.

LTI specializes in research and development with a research funding portfolio supported by the Department of Defense, National Institutes of Health, Veteran's Administration, and other entities.

Additionally, it is known for the Boston Digital Arm, the first microcontroller-equipped hand prosthesis.

In 2021, LTI was purchased by Coapt, LLC, a leader in myoelectric pattern recognition.
