= Edward Maclean Showers =

Edward Maclean Showers OBE KPM

Chief Constable of Essex County Constabulary

Personal details
- Died: 14 December 1925
- Occupation: British Army officer

Edward Maclean Showers OBE KPM (died 14 December 1925) was a British soldier and police officer who served as Chief Constable of Exeter City Police and then (from the late 1880s) Essex County Constabulary.

Showers was commissioned as an ensign in the 12th Regiment of Foot in 1866 and transferred to the 95th Regiment of Foot the following year. He was promoted lieutenant in 1871 and retired in 1872, although he was later promoted captain.

After his retirement from the Essex County Constabulary he returned to the police to act as Chief Constable of the Colchester Borough Police during the First World War. For this he was appointed Officer of the Order of the British Empire (OBE) in the 1920 civilian war honours. He was awarded the King's Police Medal (KPM) in the 1909 Birthday Honours.
