= The Party (Brooklyn Nine-Nine) =

- Brooklyn Nine-Nine episode
- Episode no.: Season 1 Episode 16
- Directed by: Michael Engler
- Written by: Gil Ozeri; Gabe Liedman
- Cinematography by: Giovani Lampassi
- Editing by: Cortney Carillo
- Production code: 115
- Original air date: February 4, 2014
- Running time: 22 minutes

Guest appearances
- Dirk Blocker as Michael Hitchcock; Joel McKinnon Miller as Norm Scully; Marilu Henner as Vivian Ludley; Marc Evan Jackson as Kevin Cozner

Episode chronology
← Previous "Operation: Broken Feather"	Next → "Full Boyle"
- Brooklyn Nine-Nine season 1

"The Party" is the sixteenth episode of the first season of the American television police sitcom series Brooklyn Nine-Nine. The episode was written by Gil Ozeri & Gabe Liedman and directed by Michael Engler, and aired on Fox in the United States on February 4, 2014. The episode was the seventeenth to be produced but the sixteenth to be broadcast.

In this episode, the gang is invited by Holt's husband (Marc Evan Jackson) to Holt's birthday party at the couple's house. Their immature personalities end up taking over despite the efforts of Terry Jeffords (Terry Crews). Meanwhile, Charles Boyle (Joe Lo Truglio) meets a woman (Marilu Henner) at the party whom he is immediately interested in. The episode was seen by an estimated 3.22 million household viewers and gained a 1.4/4 ratings share among adults aged 18–49, according to Nielsen Media Research. The episode received mostly positive reviews from critics, who praised Marc Evan Jackson's guest performance, the cast and the writing as highlights.

== Plot ==
The gang receives an invitation from Raymond Holt's (Andre Braugher) husband, Kevin Cozner (Marc Evan Jackson), to attend Holt's birthday party at their house. Before the party, Terry Jeffords (Terry Crews) instructs the squad to act mature during the party and tells them what not to do.

At the party, Jake Peralta (Andy Samberg) tries to impress Kevin by citing many of his interests. Jake goes as far as pretending to be familiar with a story from The New Yorker that Kevin read. Amy Santiago (Melissa Fumero) tries to interact with Holt and bond over their identical microwave ovens, but he shows no interest. Gina Linetti (Chelsea Peretti) becomes the subject of an investigation by a group of psychiatrists due to her talking. Charles Boyle (Joe Lo Truglio) meets Vivian Ludley (Marilu Henner), an older woman who works as a food author. They end up making out in a closet.

Peralta and Santiago go to Holt and Kevin's bedroom to find information. They are discovered by Jeffords, who scolds them. All three of them then hide in the bathroom when Holt and Kevin arrive. It is revealed that Kevin only invited the precinct because Holt told him to do so, as he said he likes them. They are exposed when the couple's dog approaches them and Santiago's allergy to dogs subsequently blows their cover. The squad is then kicked out of the house. The next day, Peralta visits Kevin at Kevin's office in Columbia University. Peralta says he finally understands Kevin's logic for not wanting to invite them to the birthday party: he hates the police due to Holt suffering insults from homophobic police officers years ago. The gang then arranges a dinner for them as compensation for ruining the party.

== Reception ==
=== Viewers ===
In its original American broadcast, "The Party" was seen by an estimated 3.22 million household viewers and gained a 1.4/4 ratings share among adults aged 18–49, according to Nielsen Media Research. This was a 30% decrease in viewership from the previous episode not counting the Super Bowl, which was watched by 4.55 million viewers with a 1.9/5 in the 18-49 demographics. This means that 1.4 percent of all households with televisions watched the episode, while 4 percent of all households watching television at that time watched it. With these ratings, Brooklyn Nine-Nine was the third most watched show on FOX for the night, behind Dads and New Girl, fifth on its timeslot and ninth for the night, behind Dads, New Girl, The Goldbergs, Person of Interest, Agents of S.H.I.E.L.D., The Biggest Loser, NCIS: Los Angeles, and NCIS.

=== Critical reviews ===
"The Party" received mostly positive reviews from critics. Roth Cornet of IGN gave the episode a "great" 8.8 out of 10 and wrote, "'The Party' placed the Nine-Nine crew firmly outside of their collective comfort zone with hilarious results. This episode, like so many on this series, was all about team bonding, but the fish out of waterness of it all proved that they don't need a case to find a reason to come together, act insane, and do a little detecting."

Molly Eichel of The A.V. Club gave the episode a "B+" grade and wrote, "If 'The Party' does one thing, it's demonstrate how monumentally confident Brooklyn Nine-Nine is in its short run, especially when it comes to its ensemble. This is an episode that's completely based on fully-formed characterization (Terry's love of the French New Wave will never die!), rather than plot. In fact, there's little plot to propel the narrative here, other than the world expansion via Kevin's introduction. Seriously, Peralta spends most of the episode looking for a magazine. This is not thrilling stuff. But that's okay."

Alan Sepinwall of HitFix wrote, "Brooklyn Nine-Nine is at a point where it's mastered its tone and the strengths of its ensemble. I think there's still room for it to get even funnier, but if it stays at this terrific level, I'll have no complaints."
