= First party =

First party may refer to:

- First Party of Tasmania, a political party in Australia
- First-party developer in video game development

== See also ==
- Third party (disambiguation)
- First Party System of the United States
- First-party logistics providers
