= Pity Party =

Pity Party may refer to:

== Music ==
- The Pity Party, American band from Los Angeles
- Pity Party, a 2007 album by Más Rápido!
- The Pity Party, a 1998 album by David Dondero
- "Pity Party" (song), a 2015 single and 2016 EP by Melanie Martinez
- "Pity Party", a 1978 song by Barbara Mandrell from Moods
- "Pity Party", a 1985 song by Bill Anderson
- "Pity Party", a 2009 song by Blockhead from The Music Scene
- "The Pity Party", a 2003 song by Breather Resist from Only in the Morning
- "Pity Party", a 2008 song by The Dopamines
- "Pity Party", a 2018 song by lovelytheband from Finding It Hard to Smile
- "Pity Party", an unreleased song by Natasha Bedingfield
- "Pity Party", a 2009 song by Saint Motel from ForPlay
- "Pity Party", a 2022 song by Stand Atlantic from F.E.A.R.
- "Pity Party", a 2013 song by Tricia from Radiate
- "Pity Party", a 2011 song by Whitton from Rare Bird
- "Pity Party (of One)", a 2013 song by Placebo from Loud Like Love

== Television ==
- "Pity Party", a 2008 episode of The Colbert Report

== See also ==
- Pity
- Self-pity
- Puddles Pity Party, American clown band from Atlanta
