= Amy Lau =

American interior designer (1968–2025)

- Born: December 12, 1968; Scottsdale, Arizona, U.S.
- Died: January 17, 2025 (aged 56); Scottsdale, Arizona, U.S.
- Education: University of Arizona (BA); Sotheby's Institute of Art (MFA)
- Occupation: Interior designer

Amy Marie Lau (December 12, 1968 – January 17, 2025) was an American contemporary interior designer and co-founder of the Design Miami fair. Lau was a featured designer in Luxe Magazine, New York Spaces, Open House, and HGTV.

== Background ==
Lau was born in Scottsdale, Arizona, on December 12, 1968. She grew up in Paradise Valley, Arizona, part of an artistic family. She studied art history at the University of Arizona and went on to receive a master's degree in fine and decorative arts from Sotheby's Institute of Art.

Lau resided in New York City, where she established her interior design firm, Amy Lau Design, in the West Chelsea arts district.

Lau died from cancer in Scottsdale on January 17, 2025, at the age of 56.

== Career ==
After several years with the New York galleries Aero and Lin-Weinberg, Lau launched her interior design firm in 2001, and continued to serve as an independent adviser to decorative arts collectors of the 20th Century.

Lau was awarded an honorary doctorate from The New York School of Interior Design in 2012, and was the keynote speaker for the college's 175 graduating candidates.

In 2005, Lau co-founded the Design Miami fair, which assembles galleries specializing in design from the post-war period to the present. Established to run in conjunction with Art Basel Miami Beach, the Design Miami fair has expanded to become a forum for exhibiting, discussing, creating, and collecting designs. In 2011, Amy Lau Design published a monograph. During 2010–2011, Lau was a spokesperson for Benjamin Moore's print, television, and online campaign "Paint with the Very Best".

The firm recently expanded to include retail design with an Elie Tahari fashion boutique that was published in Interior Design magazine. Amy Lau and her residential interiors have also been featured in publications such as Architectural Digest (Nov. 2013, Nov. 2016), Metropolitan Home, Elle Decor, The New York Times, Hamptons Cottages & Gardens (cover), Luxe (cover), New York Spaces, Gotham, and House & Garden.
