= Doom Loop =

Studio album by Dream Nails
- Released: 13 October 2023
- Genre: Punk rock
- Length: 31:51
- Language: English
- Label: Marshall Records
- Producer: Ross Orton

Dream Nails chronology
Dream Nails (2020)	Doom Loop (2023)

"I love the juxtaposition of the album title, Doom Loop – i.e. negative, dark, heavy, difficult and a smiling, brazen, vampire, messy face. Actually, it's an image of joy and carefree attitude. It's quite nice to have that bouncing off the title of the album. It undermines it in some ways."

—Guitarist Anya Pearson on the cover art depicting bassist Mimi Jasson smiling

Doom Loop is the second full-length studio album by British punk band Dream Nails.

== Reception ==
At Clash Music, Julia Mason rated this album an 8 out of 10, calling the band "outspoken yet vulnerable, confronting yet honest, ferocious yet calm" and stating that the music is "about self-expression, opening up so that others can find community and thus hope. Together they have succeeded in producing an album which welcomes us all into their world." James Hingle of Kerrang! rated this album 4 out of 5 for displaying the band's "infectious ability to combine powerful storytelling with upbeat punk jams tailor-made for bopping along to". The Skinny's Cheri Amour rated this album 3 out of 5 stars, praising new vocalist Ishmael Kirby and the band's signature rock sound, while also noting that the album "surprises with tender, piano-led closer 'Time Ain't No Healer'".

== Track listing ==
1. "Good Guy" – 2:55
2. "Case Dismissed" – 3:36
3. "Geraniums" – 2:39
4. "Prevenge" – 3:08
5. "Monster" – 3:39
6. "Sometimes I Do Get Lonely, Yeah" – 3:35
7. "She's Cutting My Hair" – 3:12
8. "Femme Boi" – 3:01
9. "Ballpit" – 3:05
10. "Time Ain't No Healer" – 3:00

== Personnel ==
Dream Nail

- Mimi Jasson – bass guitar
- Lucy Katz – drums
- Ishmael Kirby – vocals
- Anya Pearson – guitar

Additional personnel

- Ross Orton – production

== See also ==
- 2023 in British music
- List of 2023 albums
