= The Shore (band) =

- Origin: Los Angeles, California, U.S.
- Genres: Neo-psychedelia; psychedelic pop; psychedelic rock; Britpop; power pop
- Years active: 2002–present
- Labels: Maverick
- Members: Ben Ashley; Kyle Mullarky; Cliff Magreta; John Wilmer; Wayne Faler

The Shore is an American psychedelic rock group formed in 2002 in Los Angeles, California. They were signed to Maverick Records in 2002 and released their self-titled debut album in 2004. After Maverick was shut down, they independently released their second and third studio albums, Light Years and Second Sight, in 2008 and 2014, respectively.

== History ==
Singer-songwriter and guitarist Ben Ashley moved from his hometown of Philadelphia to Los Angeles and recorded a set of demos with producer Rick Parker in the spring of 2002. Guitarist Kyle Mullarky, bassist Cliff Magreta, and drummer John Wilmer were brought on to contribute to the demos, and eventually formed The Shore with Ashley after Parker found A&R for the group, which led to a record deal with Maverick Records.

The Shore's debut self-titled studio album was written over the course of three months by Ashley and produced and mixed by Parker. It was released in August 2004 through Maverick, two months after Madonna, the label's co-founder, left. Although the album failed to receive much attention outside of airplay on college radio stations, throughout 2005, they toured in promotion of the album in the United Kingdom and the United States, and soon began writing material for their next studio album. Wayne Faler, a touring guitarist and background vocalist, was added as a permanent member of the band in 2005. Soon after, Maverick was shut down.

The Shore independently released their second studio album, Light Years, in September 2008. Andrew Leahey of AllMusic favorably described the album as "every bit as hazily gorgeous as its predecessor." The band's third studio album, Second Sight, was released in 2014.

== Musical style ==
The Shore has frequently been compared by critics to English rock band The Verve. The Daily Titan compared the band's early music to rock music of the 1960s and 1970s, while The Badger Herald's Chris Ewing compared it to early-1990s Britpop, describing it as "safe psychedelic". AllMusic's Andrew Leahey wrote that the band had a "mix of California psychedelic rock and summery swoon." According to Spartan Daily, "the band portrays a very neo-psychedelic pop sound and mixes it up with lush keyboards to have a modern sound." The Shore are influenced by the bands Oasis and Coldplay. Ashley has listed singer-songwriters Neil Young and Gram Parsons as influences.

== Members ==
- Ben Ashley – lead vocals, lead guitar (2002–present)
- John Wilmer – drums (2002–present)
- Kyle Mullarky – guitar, bass (2002–present)
- Cliff Magreta – bass (2002–present)
- Wayne Faler – guitar, background vocals (2005–present)

== Discography ==
=== Albums ===
List of studio albums with selected details
Title	Details
The Shore	Released: August 3, 2004; Label: Maverick; Format: CD, digital download, streaming
Light Years	Released: September 8, 2008; Label: The New Black; Format: LP, CD, digital download, streaming
Second Sight	Released: November 10, 2014; Label: Self-released; Format: Digital download, streaming

=== Extended plays ===
List of extended plays with selected details
Title	Details
The Shore	Released: December 9, 2003; Label: Maverick; Format: CD, digital download, streaming
NapsterLive	Released: March 23, 2004; Label: Maverick; Format: Digital download, streaming

=== Singles ===
List of singles, showing year released and album title
Title	Year	Album
"Hard Road"	2004	The Shore
"I Believe in You"	2004	The Shore
"Waiting for the Sun"	2005	The Shore
