= The New Fidelity =

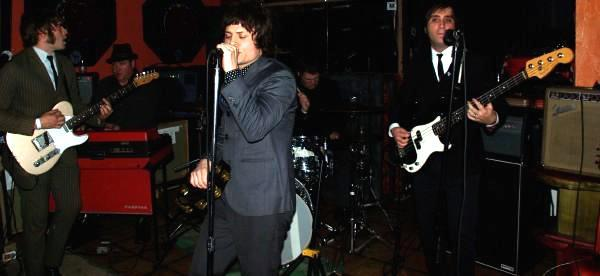

Background information
- Origin: Long Beach, California, United States
- Genres: Rock
- Years active: 2005-2012
- Members: Daniel Perkins, R. Scott Dibble, Shawn Malone, Billy Parkinson, Roberto Escobar
- Website: newfidelity.com

The New Fidelity is an American mod/power-pop band founded in Long Beach, CA in 2005. The New Fidelity are heavily influenced by 1960s pop and rock, and most of their music is steeped in two-, three-, and four-part harmony. Bands including The Beatles, The Zombies, The Who, and The Beach Boys are obvious influences as well as 1980s mod revival and jangle pop.

The New Fidelity are listed on 2 annual "Hot 100" unsigned bands of the nationally published Music Connection Magazine lists, and are mentioned on National Public Radio's Off Ramp by KROQ-FM Los Angeles Deejay Rodney Bingenheimer as a favorite contemporary band. Festival performances include 3 appearances at the International Pop Overthrow Festival, and The High Rollers International Scooter Rally, held annually in Las Vegas Nevada for vintage Vespa and Lambretta aficionados who enjoy the 1960s style of music similar to The New Fidelity. Their 3 releases are distributed by Not Lame Recordings in Fort Collins, Colorado.

== Television licensing ==
The song "No Way Back" from their second release "Tiny Slivers" appeared nationally on NBC on episode 2 of the prime time series Parenthood in early 2010 (Man Vs. Possum). In February 2008, 2 additional songs from Tiny Slivers, "Days When She Was Mine", and "2nd Once In A Lifetime Girl", appeared in the United States on ABC's Eli Stone on the opening scenes of Episodes 2 and 3. An early version of the song "No Way Back" from their first self produced, self-titled recording also appeared on The WB Television Network in 2005 on the nationally syndicated show Jack & Bobby. The program was later aired on The Australian Broadcasting Corporation and in other European countries. The song "First Day", also from their first release, appeared on nationally syndicated Fuel TV in a snowboarding series by Absinthe Films. The same song also appeared in a compilation released by the Village Voice owned Orange County Weekly in 2006. A Sony Pictures produced pilot for ABC, called Mr. Sunshine, includes the songs "Simple Things" and "Dark Eyes" from the 2009 "All Here Now" release. The show is currently pending for production in Fall of 2010.

== Radio play ==
The New Fidelity song Days When She Was Mine was played on nationally recognized Morning Becomes Eclectic on KRCW in Los Angeles with founding deejay Nic Harcourt. Long time KROQ deejay Rodney Bingenheimer has played several songs from the New Fidelity on his Rodney On The Roq show, originally playing several songs from their Tiny Slivers record, and, more recently he debuted their 2009 EP All Here Now" by regularly playing "Best Time To Say Goodbye", and including it on a "Best of 2009" show, and continues to play the band in 2010.

== Film ==
The New Fidelity makes a cameo appearance in the Erin Cassidy directed mod subculture film We Are The Mods as the band performing in the nightclub scene playing along the Small Faces song "Whatcha Gonna Do About It". At the time of filming the director needed a band that could look the part of a contemporary mod subculture band playing at a club in modern day Los Angeles. The film debuted at the Directors Guild of America Theater in Hollywood for Outfest and won several awards including best feature film and outstanding soundtrack, the band is scheduled to play at the theater for the conclusion of the theatrical debut of the film in July 2010. The song "Setting Sun" from the All Here Now EP is featured in the Lawrence Trilling comedy Group Sex during a chase scene involving a Vespa motor scooter. The film features actors Henry Winkler and Tom Arnold, and is scheduled for release on DVD in August, 2010.

== Discography ==
- The New Fidelity, produced by Billy Parkinson, self-released, August 2, 2006, out of print
- Tiny Slivers, produced by Brad Gordon, self-released, July 17, 2007
- All Here Now, produced by Brad Gordon, self-released, Aug 29, 2009

== Members ==
- Daniel Perkins, songwriter, guitar vocals
- Roberto Escobar, bass, vocals
- Billy Parkinson, drums, vocals
- Shawn Malone, guitar, vocals
- R Scott Dibble, keyboards
