= Gallery 5 =

Art gallery in Richmond, Virginia, US

Coordinates: 37°32′51.7″N 77°26′34.3″W

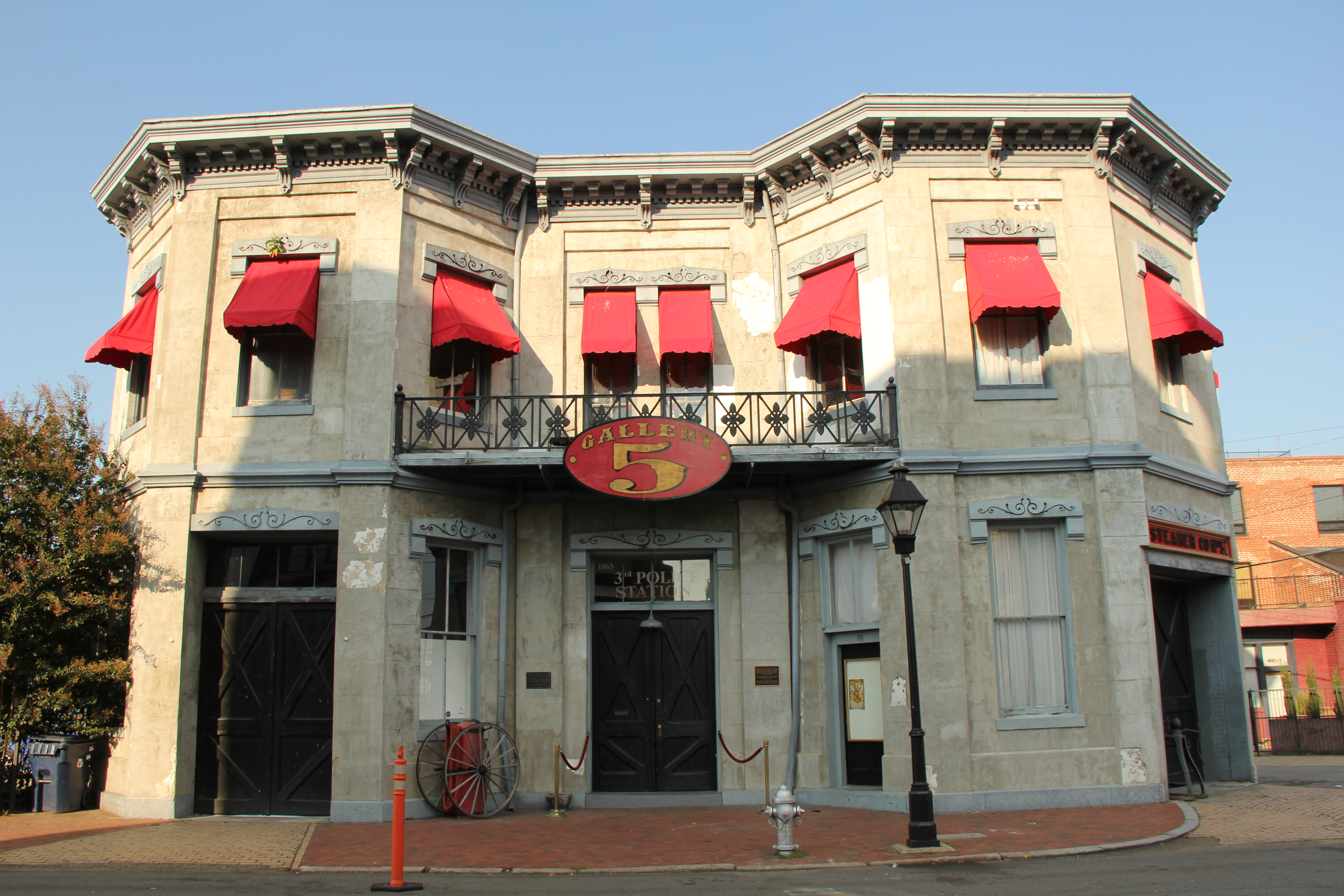
Gallery 5

Gallery5 is an arts center, museum, gallery, venue, and community space located in Richmond, VA. It is located at 200 West Marshall Street in the historic Jackson Ward neighborhood. Gallery5 has been housed in the original building of Steamer Company Number 5 since opening in 2005. This historic building has seen many incarnations; in addition to the original fire station the building has also served as a police station and a museum honoring police and firefighting history. The gallery is a cornerstone participant in Richmond's monthly First Friday Art Walk, which takes place on the first Friday of every month and draws artists and art enthusiasts to Downtown Richmond.
