= Reggie Showers =

- Born: February 6, 1964 (age 62); Philadelphia, Pennsylvania
- Education: Temple University
- Occupation: Motorcycle drag racer
- Years active: 1989–
- Known for: Double amputee and International Drag Bike Association world champion, 14 world records

Reggie Showers (born February 6, 1964) is a two-time motorcycle drag racing world champion in the IDBA as a double amputee, and a motivational speaker.

== Accident ==
In 1978, at the age of 14, Showers lost both of his legs below the knee in an electrical accident. He later said of his disability, "It really didn't faze me; it was kind of surreal. I just said, 'Come on, let's get it over with.' This was another challenge."

== Motorcycle drag racing ==
Showers had a successful career drag racing motorcycles in the National Hot Rod Association series. He used specially-made race-day prosthetics that made him shorter than his usual stature. Showers has retired from drag racing. He is now a motivational speaker working with mentorship programs; he is also an enthusiastic participant in adaptive snowboarding.

On Saturday, 21 June 2008, Showers proposed to his girlfriend Vikki on-camera during the ESPN2 coverage of the NHRA Super Nationals in Englishtown, NJ. It aired on Sunday, 29 June 2008 during the NHRA Summit Nationals in Norwalk, OH.
