= April shower =

Rain during April

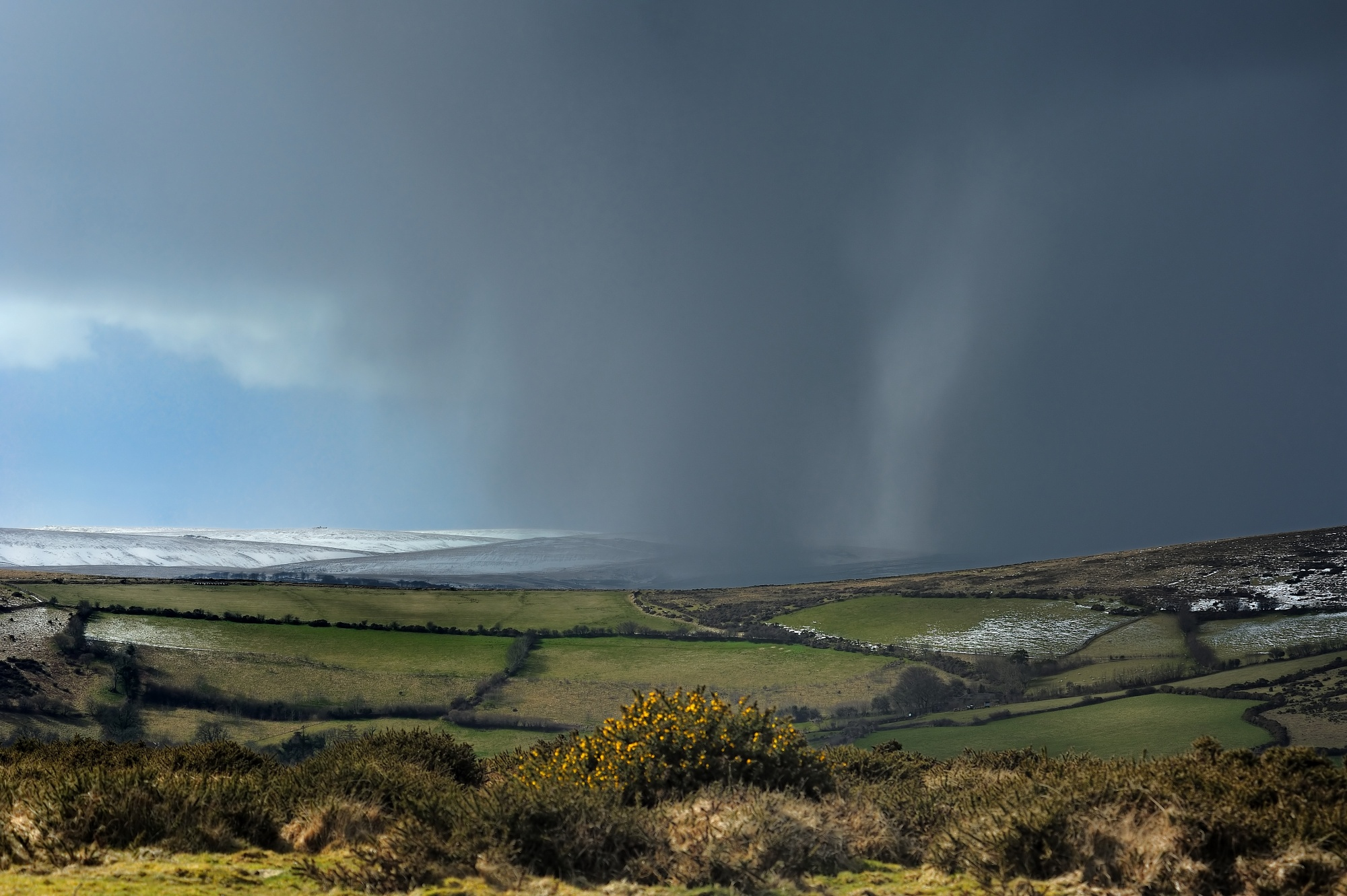
An approaching April shower of snow on Dartmoor, Devon, England (31 March 2010)

In parts of the Northern Hemisphere, an April shower is rain during the month of April. One of the major causes of the often heavy downpours is the position of the jet stream. In early spring, the jet stream starts to move northwards, allowing large depressions to bring strong winds and rain in from the Atlantic. In one day the weather can change from springtime sunshine to winter sleet and snow. The track of these depressions can often be across Ireland and Scotland bringing bands of rain followed by heavy showers (often of hail or snow) and strong blustery winds. In France, this meteorological phenomenon is known as "Giboulées de mars" (March sudden sleet showers).

The proverb "March winds and April showers bring forth May flowers", first recorded in 1886, and the shorter, trochaic version "April showers bring May flowers" (originally "Sweet April showers/Do spring May flowers", part of a poem recorded in 1610) are common expressions in English speaking countries. The phrase is referenced in the General Prologue of The Canterbury Tales: "Whan that Aprill, with his shoures soote The droghte of March hath perced to the roote".

== Meteorological data ==
In London, the smallest chance of a wet day in the year is on April 27. The average sliding 31-day rainfall during April is also fairly low, at about 1.3 inches (3.3 cm).

In Edinburgh, the smallest chance of a wet day in the year is on April 18. The average sliding 31-day rainfall during April is also fairly low, at about 1.5 inches (3.8 cm).

In Dublin, the smallest chance of a wet day in the year is on April 21. The average sliding 31-day rainfall during April is also fairly low, at about 1.8 inches (4.6 cm).
