= Traditional Home =

- Editor: Ann Maine
- Categories: Design and decorating magazine
- Frequency: Six times a year
- Total circulation (2013): 872,258
- Founded: 1989
- Final issue: Fall/Winter 2019
- Company: People Inc.
- Country: United States
- Based in: Des Moines, Iowa; New York City
- Language: English
- Website: www.traditionalhome.com
- ISSN: 1052-4398

Traditional Home was a design and decorating magazine that targeted affluent readers. The magazine was published by the Meredith Corporation and celebrated the pleasures of modern life through the prism of classic taste. It was the best-selling shelter magazine at newsstands for nine consecutive years. Launched in 1989 under the direction of founding editor Karol DeWulf Nickell, Traditional Home was published eight times a year until 2017 when it was redesigned to produce six volumes per year. It reached 4.5 million readers. The magazine moved to quarterly publication effective with the Fall/Winter 2019 issue.

== Leadership ==
Ann Maine was the editor-in-chief of Traditional Home, a position she assumed in 2002. Maine had over 20 years of experience as an editor in the shelter magazine category during which she held editorial leadership positions at Country Home, Renovation Style, Country Gardens and the Better Homes and Gardens Special Interest Media publications.

Marsha Raisch, the executive editor of Traditional Home, assisted editor-in-chief Ann Maine in setting the editorial direction and overall content for the Traditional Home. Prior to Traditional Home, Raisch held several editorial positions at Better Homes and Gardens Special Interest Media group including editor of Kitchen and Bath Ideas and Editorial Manager for the Building/Remodeling/Kitchens division where she directed and oversaw 16 special interest titles, including: Beautiful New Homes, Remodeling Ideas, Beautiful Kitchens, Kitchen Planning Guide, and Kitchen & Bath Products Guide.

Kathryn Finney was the art director of Traditional Home. She worked with editor-in-chief Ann Maine and a design staff to produce and constantly present a fresh look for Traditional Home. This involved working with internal and external photographers, illustrators, graphic designers, separators and printers to produce Traditional Home eight times a year. Finney joined Traditional Home in 2002 from Renovation Style with more than 20 years experience career as an art director and graphic designer.

=== Other editors ===
- Michael Diver, Managing Editor
- Candace Ord Manroe, Senior Decorating Editor
- Robert Young, Senior Interior Design and Projects Editor
- Krissa Rossbund, Design Editor
- Amy Elbert, Senior Architecture Editor
- Doris Athineos, Senior Art and Antiques Editor
- Ethne Clarke, Garden Editor
- Jenny Bradley, Lifestyle and Events Editor
