= Partial =

Partial may refer to:

== Mathematics ==
- Partial derivative, derivative with respect to one of several variables of a function, with the other variables held constant
  - ∂, a symbol that can denote a partial derivative, sometimes pronounced "partial dee"
  - Partial differential equation, a differential equation that contains unknown multivariable functions and their partial derivatives

== Other uses ==
- Partial application, in computer science the process of fixing a number of arguments to a function, producing another function
- Partial charge or net atomic charge, in chemistry a charge value that is not an integer or whole number
- Partial fingerprint, impression of human fingers used in criminology or forensic science
- Partial seizure or focal seizure, a seizure that initially affects only one hemisphere of the brain
- Partial or Part score, in contract bridge a trick score less than 100, as well as other meanings
- Partial or Partial wave, one sound wave of which a complex tone is composed in a harmonic series
- Showing partiality, favor, or bias

== Arts and entertainment ==
- Partial (music)
- Partials (novel)

== See also ==
- Part (disambiguation)
- Partial function in mathematics, a function for some subset of a total function
- Partially ordered set in mathematics, an ordering, sequencing, or arrangement of the elements of a set
