= Death by Stereo discography =

- Studio albums: 6
- EPs: 4
- Live albums: 2
- Music videos: 8
- Demos: 1

The Discography of Death by Stereo, an American hardcore punk, consist of six studio albums, two live albums, eight music video's, one demo, and have made various appearances on numerous compilation albums.

== Studio albums ==
Year	Title	Label	Format	Other information
1999	If Looks Could Kill, I'd Watch You Die	Indecision	CD	Only release on Indecision Records.; Only album recorded with guitarist Keith Barney and drummer Jarrod Alexander.
2000	Day of the Death	Epitaph	CD	In Europe, this album was released in 2000 and in the United States in 2001.; First release on Epitaph Records.; First album recorded with guitarist Dan Palmer.; Only album recorded with drummer Tim Bender.; Also released on Vinyl format on Indecision Records
2003	Into the Valley of Death	Epitaph	CD	Last album recorded with guitarist Jim Miner and bassist Paul Miner.; First release with guitarist Tim "Tito" Owens.; Also released on Vinyl format on Indecision Records
2005	Death for Life	Epitaph	CD	First album recorded with current bassist Tyler Rebbe.; Last album recorded with guitarist Tim "Tito" Owens and drummer Todd Hennig.
2009	Death Is My Only Friend	Serjical Strike & I Scream Records	CD	Death By Stereo's first album not on Epitaph since If Looks Could Kill, I'd Watch You Die.; First recording with new bassit Jeff Clark.; Guitarist Jim Miner, returned to the band to help write this album.; Original bassist Paul Miner returned to master this album.
2012	Black Sheep of the American Dream	Viking Funeral Records	CD	Death By Stereo's first album on Viking Funeral Records.; First album recorded with current Drummer Mike Cambra.; Original bassist Paul Miner returned to the band.
2020	We're All Dying Just In Time	Indecision Records	CD, Vinyl, Digital	

== Live albums ==
Year	Title	Label	Format	Other information
2003	Law of Inertia Live Series Volume 3	Law of Inertia Magazine	CD	Recorded Live 29 October 2003, at Chain Reaction in Anaheim CA.; Chain Reaction Donated for free, and all proceeds donated to Solar Haus charity.; Given away for free with Law of Inertia Magazine; Out of print since late 2003.
2007	Death Alive	Reignition Records	CD	A re-release of the above album.; Released March 13, 2007.

== EPs ==
Year	Title	Label	Format	Other information
1998	Fooled By Your Smile	Indecision	7"	Recorded with original guitarist Ian Fowles; Side A = Fooled By Your Smile, Side B = Bet Against Me
2000	Death by Stereo/Ensign split	Indecision	7"	Split With Ensign; Tracks 1. From The Minds Of Sick People 2. Emo Holocaust 3. Hippie Holocaust 4. Never Go Home Again 5. Basic, Simple True; Tracks 1-3 Death By Stereo Tracks 4-5 Ensign
2000	No Shirt, No Shoes, No Salvation	Epitaph	7"	Sometimes referred to as self-titled, because the cover has no writing whatsoever on it; Side A = No Shirt, No Shoes, No Salvation, Side B = Would You Like To Be My Neighbour; Side A From Day of the Death, Side B unreleased
2016	Just Like You'd Leave Us, We've Left You for Dead	Irish Voodoo Records/Arrest Records	10", CD, tape, digital	

== Demos ==
- Five-Song Demo Tape. The band's first recording. 4/5 songs went on to be re-recorded and included in their first album. (1998)

== Music videos ==
- Desperation Train (2000)
- Wasted Words (2003)
- I Give My Life (2005)
- Middle Fingers (2005)
- Entombed We Collide (2005)
- I Sing for You (2009)
- Welcome to the Party (2009)
- Growing Numb (2012)
- Rejected (Rancid Cover) (2015)
- Neverending (2016)
- I Think About Killing You Everyday (2016)

== Compilations ==
(Name Of Compilation - Song)

- Devils Night (Live Compilation 7 inch including other bands Ensign, Adamantium, Missing 23rd, Eyelid) (1999)
- Punk-O-Rama 5 - Lookin' Out For No. 1 (2000)
- Punk Goes Metal - Little Fighter (White Lion Cover) (2000)
- Punk-O-Rama Vol. 6 - Holding $60 On A Burning Bridge (2001)
- Indecision Records Split Series - 3 Songs from Ensign split (2001)
- Punk-O-Rama 7 - Wasted Words (Demo Version) (2002)
- Punk-O-Rama 8 - Unstoppable (2003)
- Bring You To Your Knees (G&R Tribute) - Anything Goes (Cover) (2003)
- Punk-O-Rama Vol. 9 - The Plague (Live Oct 03) (2004)
- Warped Tour 10 2004 Tour Compilation - Beyond the Blinders (2004)
- Masters Of Horror Soundtrack - Bottled Up (From DFL Sessions) (2005)

== Compilation DVDs ==
- Punk O Rama The Videos - Desperation Train (2002)
- Indecision Video Vault - Various performances and interviews (2003)
