= Death by Stereo/Ensign =

EP by Death by Stereo/Ensign
- Released: December 2000
- Recorded: June 2000; For the Record & Death Tracks (DbS); Spin Studios, Long Island, New York (Ensign)
- Genre: Hardcore punk
- Length: 8:26
- Label: Indecision Records
- Producer: Death by Stereo & Ensign

Death by Stereo chronology
If Looks Could Kill, I'd Watch You Die (1999)	Death by Stereo/Ensign (2000)	Day of the Death (2001)

Ensign chronology
For What It's Worth (EP) (2000)	Death by Stereo/Ensign split 7-inch EP (2000)	The Price of Progression (2001)

The Death by Stereo/Ensign split 7-inch EP was released by Indecision Records in December 2000. It was an interesting release because both bands had left the label. Ensign in 1998 to go to Nitro Records, and Death by Stereo to go to Epitaph Records. At the time, Death by Stereo were recording material for their new studio release, Day of the Death, and Ensign were in New York City producing an EP for Nitro Records, For What It's Worth. They both agreed to record extra tracks for release by the label which had arguably launched their careers.

In line with Indecision Records custom, they released the 7-inch in limited numbers, 1517 on black vinyl and 480 on brown vinyl. All five tracks were later re-released by Indecision Records on a CD compilation of some of their back catalogue of split EPs. It was called Indecision Records Split Series and was released in April 2001.

== Overview ==
Death by Stereo's contribution commenced with a 54-second, almost death metal blast called "Hippie Holocaust". It finished with a 57-second reprise called "Emo Holocaust", which was almost exactly the same, but with flourishes and a guitar solo. The lyrics were identical, both attacking sections of modern music culture, with the exception of the line, "Hippie holocaust, your blood is mine" which was changed to "Emo holocaust, your sweater can't save you now!". Not that the lyrics were actually deciperhable. The track in between, "From the Minds of Sick People" was very much akin to material from Day of the Death, but could have fitted into either that or their debut album.

Ensign's first track, "Never Go Home Again", was eventually re-recorded for their Nitro Records swansong, The Price of Progression. That and the other track, "Basic, Simple, True", were both in the mould of Ensign's new, more metalcore direction.

== Track listing ==
=== Death by Stereo side ===
- All songs by Death by Stereo
1. "Hippie Holocaust" – 0:54
2. "From the Minds of Sick People" – 2:24
3. "Emo Holocaust" – 0:57

=== Ensign side ===
- All songs by Ensign
1. "Never Go Home Again" – 1:57
2. "Basic, Simple, True" – 2:14

== Credits ==
=== Death by Stereo ===
- Efrem Schulz – vocals
- Jim Miner – guitar
- Dan Palmer – guitar
- Paul Miner – bass
- Tim Bender – drums
- Recorded in June 2000 at For the Record and Death Tracks
- Engineered by Paul Miner
- Assistant engineered by Sergio Chavez

=== Ensign ===
- Tim "Lil' Timmy DMS" Shaw – vocals
- Nate "Edge" Gluck – guitar, bass, backing vocals
- John "Vince Vegas" O'Neill – drums
- Recorded in June 2000 at Spin Recording Studios, Long Island, New York
- Produced by Nate "Edge" Gluck
- Engineered by Nik Chinboukas
- Assistant engineered by Pete Benjamin

=== All tracks ===
- Mastered by Paul Miner at QMark, February 2001
