= Death Alive =

Live album by Death by Stereo
- Released: March 13, 2007
- Recorded: Chain Reaction (Anaheim, California)
- Genre: Hardcore punk
- Length: 56 minutes
- Label: Reignition
- Producer: ???

Death by Stereo chronology
Death for Life (2005)	Death Alive (2007)	Death Is My Only Friend (2009)

Death Alive is a live album by American hardcore punk band Death by Stereo. The CD was recorded live at Chain Reaction in Anaheim, California during the Into the Valley of the Death tour. It was originally to be recorded to be given away free with an issue of Law of Inertia Magazine. However, when the band realized that many of their fans did not have a copy of the CD (few fans bought the magazine, also went out of print a few years back), they decided to re-release it with Reignition Records on March 13, 2007.

== Track listing ==
No.	Title	Length
1.	"Intro"	1:11
2.	"The Plague"	3:40
3.	"Beyond the Blinders"	4:20
4.	"Lookin' Out for #1"	3:40
5.	"These Are a Few of My Favorite Things"	2:53
6.	"Sow the Seeds"	2:52
7.	"Wasted Words"	4:23
8.	"Sing Along With the Patriotic Punks"	3:44
9.	"Shh... This Will Be Our Little Secret"	3:22
10.	"Desperation Train"	2:51
11.	"Let Down and Alone"	3:27
12.	"Holding 60 Dollars on a Burning Bridge"	1:51
13.	"High School Was Like Boot Camp for a Desk Job"	2:47
14.	"Emo Holocaust"	2:45
15.	"Dance Party"	2:24
16.	"Unstoppable"	3:55
17.	"No Shirt, No Shoes, No Salvation"	4:54
18.	"No Cuts, No Butts, No Coconuts"	2:55

== Band line-up ==
- Efrem Schulz - vocals
- Dan Palmer - lead guitar, backing vocals
- Jim Miner - rhythm guitar, backing vocals
- Paul Miner - bass, backing vocals
- Todd Hennig - drums, backing vocals
