= Ensign (band) =

American hardcore punk band

- Origin: New Brunswick, New Jersey, U.S.
- Genres: Hardcore punk
- Years active: 1995–present
- Labels: Indecision; Nitro; Blackout; Join the Team Player
- Members: Tim Shaw; Dan Brennan; Nate Gluck; Derek Reilly; Corey Perez
- Past members: Frank Piegaro; Brian "Pnut" Kozuch; Walt Svekla; Ryan Murphy; Michael Gall; Chris Ross; John Fraunberger; Ryan "Mackenzie" Donoghue; John "Vince Vegas" O'Neill; Chris Oliver; Chris Byrnes; Graham Gardener
- Website: Ensign at Indecision Records

Ensign is an American hardcore punk band from New Jersey. They formed in 1995 and signed with Indecision Records in 1996. They signed to the larger label "next door", Dexter Holland's Nitro Records, in 1998 and finally came to rest at Blackout Records in 2003 after a brief sortie back to Indecision in 2000.

== History ==
=== 1995: Beginning ===
The band was formed in New Brunswick, New Jersey by Chris Ross (drums), Walt Svekla (bass), and John Fraunberger (guitar) in 1995 and self-produced a demo. In the search for a new vocalist, they found Tim Shaw who was a roadie with Sick of It All, a band in the New York hardcore scene.

=== 1996–1998: Indecision years ===
The band went to California and signed for Indecision Records and in May 1996 released a self-titled 7-inch four-track EP. After this, Walt Svelka and Chris Ross departed and were replaced by Nate "Edge" Gluck (ex-Strength 691, Vision) and Ryan Murphy (ex-Undertow) respectively. In mid-1997, Fall from Grace, another four-track 7-inch EP, was released. John Fraunberger then left the band to take up a teaching degree, but not before recording material for the first full-length album, Direction of Things to Come which came out in November 1997. Fraunberger was replaced on guitar by Ryan "Mackenzie" Donoghue as the band took to the road. In 1998, the band decided to cast their net further and sign for Nitro Records which had a larger distribution network. Also in 1998, three live tracks appeared on an Indecision Records 7-inch Devil's Night, with other artists from the label – the remainder of the live set would later feature on the Three Years Two Months Eleven Days album.

=== 1998–2002: Nitro years ===
Although the band had switched labels, they retained the services of the same recording studio (Trax East, South River, New Jersey) and the same producer (Steve Evetts) as their debut on Indecision for the next full-length outing, Cast the First Stone released in March 1999. The band embarked on a tour of Europe and the United Kingdom in August 1999, playing a handful of cross-over shows with Florida hardcore band As Friends Rust. While on tour in Ireland, Ryan Murphy decided to leave the band and was replaced by John "Vince Vegas" O'Neill.

=== April 2000: Back at Indecision ===
In April 2000, Indecision Records released a retrospective album of Ensign material, Three Years Two Months Eleven Days — the precise amount of time the band had spent on the label. It consisted of the first 7-inch plus three tracks from the same recording session, the Fall from Grace 7-inch plus two more from the same session, two otherwise unreleased tracks, two tracks from just after the release of Direction of Things to Come sessions and, finally, six tracks recorded live in 1998 at the Showcase Theater in Corona, California – three of which had previously appeared on the Indecision Records 7-inch Devil's Night.

=== 2000: Nitro/Indecision ===
In June 2000, the band recorded four tracks in New York for an EP called For What It's Worth which was released in October 2000. They also recorded two tracks which would end up on a split 7-inch EP with Death by Stereo released by Indecision Records in December 2000, and a further two tracks which were released on a split 7-inch with Reaching Forward on a European label, Reflections Records.

The band returned to Europe and the United Kingdom in August and September 2000, again meeting up to play several cross-over shows with As Friends Rust. Before leaving on this tour, Ryan Donoghue quit the band, although on very good terms, left the band in a difficult situation. Nate solved it by employing Chris Oliver for bass duties on the tour (teaching him along the way) while taking up the guitar duties himself.

=== Nitro years (continued) ===
In November 2000, the band entered the studio to start recording their third full-length release, The Price of Progression. Chris Byrnes came in December to add some second guitar parts as Nate was performing on bass and guitar, as well as the usual backing vocals. Chris Oliver had played bass on the initial takes as a favor to Nate, and continued to play for a while after. The band was also joined on vocals for guest spots by Russ Rankin of Good Riddance and Andy West of Kill Your Idols. The record was finally released in April 2001. Also, in February 2001, Indecision Records re-released their split 7-inch with Death by Stereo on CD as part of their Split Series compilation.

In 2002, they headed out on a Canadian tour supporting metalcore band, Hatebreed. A tour of Europe with Avail followed in 2003.

=== 2003 to present: Blackout years ===
The band found a regular guitarist in Frank Piegaro in 2002, while John O'Neill had been replaced by Brian "Pnut" Kozuch in 2001. They took to a studio in Hoboken, New Jersey, and in seven days recorded twenty cover versions of artists such as Bad Brains, Descendents, Dag Nasty, Hüsker Dü, Misfits and Discharge, all seminal punk bands who had influenced members of Ensign in their formative years. The record was released in October 2003, on Blackout Records — they had agreed to do this for label owner, Bill "Blackout" Wilson, with Tim Shaw having worked with and for him during the early Indecision Records days — and it was called Love the Music, Hate the Kids. In Europe, it was released by the German label, JoinTheTeamPlayer.

=== Ensign in the United Kingdom ===
In November 2003, UK-based record label, Household Name released a split EP with Ensign and Leeds, England-based hardcore band Fig 4.0. It featured three tracks from Ensign: "A Place", "Circa 1985" and "Three Can Keep a Secret" and was limited to 500 releases on 7-inch vinyl.

== Members ==
- Tim Shaw – vocals
- Dan Brennan – guitar
- Nate Gluck – bass, guitar (2000–2002)
- Corey Perez – guitar
- Derek Reilly – drums

=== Previous members ===
- Walt Svekla – bass (1995–1996)
- Ryan Murphy – drums (1996–1999)
- Chris Ross – drums (1995–1996)
- John Fraunberger – guitar (1995–1997)
- Ryan "Mackenzie" Donoghue – guitar (1997–2000)
- John "Vince Vegas" O'Neill – drums (1999–2001)
- Chris Oliver – bass (2000–2002, live performances and rehearsals)
- Chris Byrnes – guitar (2001–2002)
- Frank Piegaro – guitar (2008–2011)
- Brian "Pnut" Kozuch – drums (2008–2011)

=== Temporary members ===
The following people are credited as playing with the band temporarily:

- Graham Gardner – vocals in 1995
- Vin Villanueva – guitar in 1995
- Steve Cunningham – guitar in 1997
- Mike Hartsfield – guitar in 1998
- Dan Palmer – guitar in 1998
- Brian Melville – guitar in 1998
- Dan Sobon – guitar between 2002–2003
- Steve Larger – drums in 1999
- Benny Horowitz – drums in 2001
- Mikey Erg – drums in 2011
- Kevin White – guitar in 2011
- Brian Maguire – drums in 2011–2012

== Discography ==
- Self-titled 7-inch EP (May 1996) Indecision Records
- Fall from Grace 7-inch EP (June 1997) Indecision Records
- Ensign / Good Riddance split 7-inch EP (1997) Orphaned Records
- Direction of Things to Come (November 1997) Indecision Records
- Devil's Night compilation 7-inch (1998) Blackout Records
- Cast the First Stone (March 1999) Nitro Records
- Three Years Two Months Eleven Days (April 2000) Indecision Records
- For What It's Worth EP (October 2000) Nitro Records
- Death by Stereo/Ensign split EP (December 2000) Indecision Records
- Ensign/Reaching Forward split 7-inch (2000) Reflections Records
- The Price of Progression (April 2001) Nitro Records
- Love the Music, Hate the Kids (October 2003) Blackout Records
- Ensign/Fig 4.0 split 7-inch EP (November 2003) Household Name, UK
- Scream for Help! compilation 2x10" (May 2006) KOI Records

== See also ==
- H_{2}O – Tim Shaw appears playing bass on a live recording hidden track on their self-titled debut album in his Sick of It All roadie days.
