= Black Sheep of the American Dream =

Studio album by Death by Stereo
- Released: April 24, 2012
- Genre: Hardcore punk
- Length: 28:48
- Label: Viking Funeral Records

Death by Stereo chronology
Death Is My Only Friend (2009)	Black Sheep of the American Dream (2012)	Just Like You'd Leave Us, We've Left You for Dead (2016)

Professional ratings
Review scores
Source	Rating
Classic Rock	6/10 stars

Black Sheep of the American Dream is the sixth studio album by American hardcore punk band Death by Stereo, released in April 2012. It is their first album released on Viking Funeral Records.

== Track listing ==
No.	Title	Length
1.	"WTF Is Going On Around Here?"	3:23
2.	"Much Like a Sore Dick, We Can't Be Beat"	3:27
3.	"Growing Numb"	3:15
4.	"Get British"	2:53
5.	"Harmonic Divisor"	2:52
6.	"Depression Expression"	3:11
7.	"Something's Changing"	2:16
8.	"Following Is What You Do Best"	2:29
9.	"The 5th of July"	2:32
10.	"Please Go to Heaven Now"	2:30

== Personnel ==
- Efrem Schulz – vocals
- Dan Palmer – lead guitar, backing vocals
- JP Gericke – rhythm guitar, backing vocals
- Paul Miner – bass, backing vocals
- Mike Cambra – drums, percussion, backing vocals
