= For What It's Worth (EP) =

For What It's Worth EP

EP by Ensign
- Released: October 2000
- Recorded: June 2000; Spin Recording Studios, New York City, U.S.
- Genre: Hardcore punk
- Length: 9:55
- Label: Nitro Records
- Producer: Nate "Edge" Gluck

Ensign chronology
Three Years Two Months Eleven Days (2000)	For What It's Worth EP (2000)	Death By Stereo/Ensign Split 7" (EP) (2000)

Professional ratings
Review scores
Source	Rating
Allmusic	2/5 stars

For What It's Worth is an EP by New Jersey hardcore punk band, Ensign. It was released in October, 2000 by Nitro Records and was the band's second release for the label following their first full-length album after leaving Indecision Records, Cast the First Stone. It was recorded in June, 2000 in New York City and at the same time the band produced two further tracks which appeared on the Death By Stereo/Ensign Split 7" (EP) on Indecision Records in December, 2000. The track, "Cast In Shadows" was later re-recorded and appeared on their next album for Nitro Records, The Price of Progression. Another track, "Left Hand Syndrome", was destined for the same release, according to the inlay details, but eventually was omitted.

== Overview ==
As was heard from Cast the First Stone, the band was beginning to slow their approach to hardcore punk in its purest state. It was on this EP that the transition moved further forward. "Cast In Shadow" was a slow-paced, chugging song with variable vocal styles, from Tim Shaw's usual hardcore shout down to a hushed tone for the middle section. The title track and "Nine-One-Zero-Zero" perhaps sound more like the Ensign of old, a slow start moving into a fast-paced middle, but with a somewhat metalcore ending. The EP's closer, "Left Hand Syndrome", was perhaps somewhat of an experimental track for the band. Straying from the start directly into more melodic hardcore territory, such as that occupied by Good Riddance in "pop-punk" mode.

Overall, the actual sound was quite different from Cast the First Stone, due mainly to the fact that Nate Gluck had assumed guitar duties as well as bass, and the raw production. The feel and style was most definitely a precursor for that of their next venture, The Price of Progression.

== Track listing ==
- All tracks written by Ensign
1. "Cast In The Shadows" – 2:11
2. "For What It's Worth" – 2:59
3. "Nine-One-Zero-Zero" – 2:27
4. "Left Hand Syndrome" – 2:19

== Credits ==
- Tim Shaw – vocals
- Nate "Edge" Gluck – guitar, bass, backing vocals
- John "Vince Vegas" O'Neill – drums
- Recorded in June, 2000 at Spin Recording Studios, Long Island, New York, USA
- Produced by Nate "Edge" Gluck
- Engineered by Nik Chinboukas
- Assistant engineered by Pete Benjamin
- Mixed by Nik Chinboukas, Pete Benjamin and Nate "Edge" Gluck
