= Death Is My Only Friend =

Studio album by Death by Stereo
- Released: July 7, 2009
- Recorded: 2007–2008
- Genre: Heavy metal, hardcore punk
- Length: 50:21
- Label: Serjical Strike
- Producer: Jason Freese

Death by Stereo chronology
Death Alive (2007)	Death Is My Only Friend (2009)	Black Sheep of the American Dream (2012)

Death Is My Only Friend is the fifth studio album by American hardcore punk band Death by Stereo, released in July 2009. It is their first album in four years, since the release of Death for Life in 2005, the longest gap between Death by Stereo's studio albums to date.

== Album information ==
Writing and recording sessions for Death Is My Only Friend lasted for almost two years, making it the longest time Death by Stereo has ever spent making an album. Writing for the follow-up to Death for Life began in the summer/fall 2006 while original guitarist Jim Miner and original drummer Jarrod Alexander would reunite with the band to work on the album.

It was confirmed by frontman Efrem Schulz that this album would be recorded with two drummers, Alexander and Chris Dalley (from Ten Foot Pole). Dalley, who had toured with the band for the last few months since the departure of longtime drummer Todd Hennig, will be doing the bulk of future tours, while Alexander tours with his post-Death by Stereo band A Static Lullaby.

Schulz also confirmed that Miner will be doing random, but will not be doing full tours while promoting this album. However, he would only be writing and recording the album, only months after his recent wrist surgery. Miner's brother, Paul, also returned to the band to play bass on the new album along with the band's current bassist, Tyler Rebbe, who has been recording an album with his other band Pulley.

Death Is My Only Friend also marks the first time that Alexander and the Miner brothers have recorded albums together under the name Death by Stereo since If Looks Could Kill, I'd Watch You Die.

The album's seventh track, "Forever and a Day" is a re-recorded version of the track of the same name from Death for Life.

The album is now out of print.

== Track listing ==
No.	Title	Length
1.	"Opening Destruction"	3:00
2.	"The Ballad of Sid Dynamite"	3:10
3.	"I Sing for You"	3:50
4.	"The Last Song"	3:49
5.	"Bread for the Dead"	3:08
6.	"Dead to Me"	3:03
7.	"Forever and a Day"	4:50
8.	"Wake the Dead"	3:02
9.	"I Got Your Back"	3:31
10.	"Who Should Die? You Should Die"	3:07
11.	"We Sing Today for a Better Tomorrow"	3:42
12.	"D.B.S.F.U."	3:18
13.	"Welcome to the Party"	3:16
14.	"Fear of a Brown Planet"	1:44
15.	"For All My Friends (The Unity Song)"	3:40

== Band line-up ==
- Efrem Schulz – vocals, guitars
- Dan Palmer – lead guitar, backing vocals
- JP Giricke – rhythm guitar, backing vocals
- Tyler Rebbe – bass, backing vocals
- Chris Dalley – drums

=== Additional credits ===
- Jason Freese – producer, piano, string arrangements
