= Love the Music, Hate the Kids =

Studio album by Ensign
- Released: October 2003
- Recorded: In 7 days
- Studio: Water Music, Hoboken, New Jersey
- Genre: Hardcore punk
- Length: 42:36
- Label: Blackout Records; JTTP (Europe)
- Producer: Nate Gluck, Ted Young

Ensign chronology
The Price of Progression (2001)	Love the Music, Hate the Kids (2003)

Professional ratings
Review scores
Source	Rating
Punknews	4/5 stars
AllMusic	2.5/5 stars

Love the Music, Hate the Kids is American hardcore punk band Ensign's fourth full-length album. It is an album of cover versions of seminal hardcore punk songs from the early-1980s to mid-1990s. It was recorded in seven days and released in October 2003. It was the band's first album for Blackout Records after switching from Nitro Records after the release of The Price of Progression in 2001.

== Overview ==
Ensign's journey from hardcore punk on their first album, Direction of Things to Come, in 1997 through to metalcore on The Price Of Progression – taking a middleground stance on Cast the First Stone in 1999 – saw them now turning full-circle into seminal, old school punk and doing an album of cover versions which had been important to them in their formative years and recognised by many fans as important to the genre.

Personnel for this recording was different from the previous release, with a different guitarist and drummer. The rushed production of the material – seven days from start to finish – did not hinder the sound; in fact it contributed to the overall "garage band" period authenticity of the project. A Killing Time cover, "Telltale", has a guest spot on guitar by Carl Porcaro who was a founding member of a New York band called Raw Deal which later became known as Killing Time. The band did receive some criticism for the Descendents' track "I'm Not a Loser".

== Track listing ==
1. "Intro" (Bad Brains) from I Against I – 0:57
2. "Kids Don't Follow" (The Replacements) from Stink EP – 2:14
3. "I've Heard" (Dag Nasty) from Can I Say – 1:38
4. "Anesthesia" (Bad Religion) from Against the Grain – 2:33
5. "I'm Not a Loser" (Descendents) from Milo Goes to College – 1:39
6. "Hurtin' Crue" (Descendents) from Enjoy! – 2:30
7. "Where's the Unity" (Infest) from Slave – 1:44
8. "Trial" (Verbal Assault) from Trial – 2:15
9. "Say It" (Underdog) from self-titled EP – 2:11
10. "Protest And Survive" (Discharge) from Never Again – 2:17
11. "Burning Fight" (Inside Out) from No Spiritual Surrender – 3:14
12. "Tied Down" (Negative Approach) from Tied Down – 1:39
13. "GI Joe Headstomp" (Sick of It All) from Blood, Sweat and No Tears – 1:22
14. "Telltale" (Killing Time) from Brightside – 1:27
15. "Hatebreeders" (Misfits) from Walk Among Us – 2:48
16. "My Father's Dream" (Articles of Faith) from What We Have Is Free 7-inch – 2:06
17. "In a Free Land" (Hüsker Dü) from In a Free Land – 2:56
18. "We'll Make the Difference" (Insted) from We'll Make a Difference – 2:14
19. "Off Target" (Christ on a Crutch) from Spread Your Filth – 3:08
20. "I Will Deny" (Dwarves) from The Dwarves Are Young and Good Looking – 1:45
- Track 5 starts as the Descendents' "Bikeage" – both from the Milo Goes To College album in 1982
- Tracks 9 and 18 were also recorded in 1996 and appear on the Ensign retrospective album Three Years Two Months Eleven Days

== Credits ==
- Tim Shaw – vocals
- Frank Piegaro – guitar
- Nate "Edge" Gluck – bass
- Brian "Pnut" Kozuch – drums
- Additional guitars on "Telltale" by Killing Time's Carl Porcaro (a cover of his own band's track)
- Additional vocals on "Anesthesia" and "I Will Deny" by Alf Bartone
- Additional vocals on "Trial" by Tim Barry
- Recorded in seven days at Water Music in Hoboken, New Jersey
- Produced by Nate Gluck and Ted Young
- Engineered by Ted Young
- Mastered by Alan Douches at West West Side, New Jersey
