= Steady as She Goes =

Steady as She Goes may refer to:

== Music ==
- Steady as She Goes (Voodoo Glow Skulls album), 2002
- Steady as She Goes (Hot Tuna album), 2011
- "Steady, As She Goes", a 2006 single by the rock band The Raconteurs
- Steady As She Goes, an album by rock singer Jimmy "Orion" Ellis
- "Steady as She Goes", a song by Mark Collie from Tennessee Plates, 1995
- "Steady as She Goes", a song by Shellac from Excellent Italian Greyhound, 2007

== Other ==
- Steady As She Goes: A History of the Compass Department of the Admiralty, a book by inventor Tuomas Vohlonen
- "Steady as She Goes", a season 4 episode of Who's the Boss
