= Figure-four =

The term figure-four may refer to:

- Figure-four (climbing), a technique employed in technical climbing, particularly mixed and ice climbing
- Figure-four (grappling hold), a type of grappling hold
  - A variation of the Jackknife hold
- A descriptor of a professional wrestling hold; most notably the Figure four leglock
- Figure Four, a Canadian metalcore band
- Figure Four (Battle Angel Alita), a fictional character in the Battle Angel Alita manga series
- Figure-four deadfall, a type of trap
- Fig.4.0, an English hardcore punk band
