= Heckle (band) =

American rock band

- Origin: New Jersey, United States
- Genres: Hardcore punk Melodic hardcore
- Years active: 1994–199?
- Labels: Wingnut Records; Hopeless Records
- Past members: Eric Arikian; Tim Caspare; Steve Cunningham; Todd Hennig; Chris Whalen; Chris Baglieri; Jim Miner

Heckle was a melodic hardcore/punk rock band from New Jersey, United States.

The band was formed in the summer of 1994 by guitarist Steve Cunningham, bass player Chris Whalen, guitarist Eric Arikian and vocalist Chris Baglieri, Heckle (briefly named "Lick") found original drummer Tim Caspare to complete the group. The band then released a split single in January 1996 with AFI, followed in the spring of 1996 by a full-length LP on Wingnut Records entitled We're Not Laughing With You. After a nationwide summer tour, the band parted ways with their original drummer. The position was then filled by Todd Hennig who was the drummer for the Vermont hardcore band SevenYearsWar, which Steve had once played guitar for. After another East Coast tour, Heckle was signed by Hopeless Records and recorded their second and final album with Donnell Cameron at Westbeach Recorders in Hollywood, California The Complicated Futility of Ignorance. Henning and Miner later joined Death by Stereo. Arikian and Whalen featured in the group Let's Be Loveless.

== Members ==
Original lineup:

- Eric Arikian - guitar
- Christopher Baglieri - vocals (1994–1995)
- Steve Cunningham - guitar, vocals
- Chris Whalen - bass
- Tim Caspare - drums (1994–1996)

Later members:

- Todd Hennig - drums (1996–1997)
- Jim Miner - guitar (1997)

== Discography ==
- AFI/Heckle split 7-inch single (Wingnut Records, 1996) – with AFI
- We're Not Laughing With You CD/LP (Wingnut Records, 1996)
- Jughead's Revenge/Heckle split 7-inch single with Jughead's Revenge (Hopeless Records, 1997)
- The Complicated Futility of Ignorance CD/LP (Hopeless Records, 1997)
- The Motive Power of Fire EP (2021)
- Adequately Feigned Competence EP (2024)

Compilation Appearances:

- Punk Fiction song "D-Day" CD (Wedge Records, 1997)
- From the Ground Up song "Safety Net" (Eyeball Records, 1996)
- Hopelessly Devoted to You, Too song "Joke's on Me" (Hopeless Records, 1998)
- Take Action! song "Little Engine" (Sub City Records, 1999)
- Hopelessly Devoted to You Vol. 3 song "Along For The Ride" (Hopeless Records, 2000)
