= The Suicide File =

American hardcore punk band

- Origin: Boston, Massachusetts, U.S.
- Genres: Hardcore punk
- Years active: 2001–2003, 2009, 2015, 2023
- Labels: Indecision, Deathwish Inc.
- Members: Dave Weinberg; Neeraj Kane; Jarrod Alexander; John Carpenter; Jason Correia; Jimmy Carroll; Michael Chung

The Suicide File was an American hardcore punk band from Boston, Massachusetts that formed in April 2001. The band wrote songs mostly about social and personal problems. Most of the band's output was released on the Southern California-based hardcore label Indecision Records. The band reunited in June 2006 to embark on their first European Tour. Members of the bands are or have been affiliated with The Hope Conspiracy, Death by Stereo, When Tigers Fight, Adamantium, American Nightmare, Clouds, Panic and many more. Most of these are bands with whom Alexander has drummed for short periods of time. Despite their short tenure, The Suicide File continues to be revered within the hardcore punk community for their musical output and lasting impression on the flourishing Boston hardcore scene. The band since 2006 has played a small number of successfully sized reunion sets.

== Members ==
- Dave Weinberg – vocals
- Neeraj Kane – guitar
- Jarrod Alexander – drums
- Jason Correia – guitar
- John Carpenter – bass
- Jimmy Carroll – guitar on Things Fall Apart 7-inch
- Michael Chung – guest producer

== Discography ==
=== Albums ===
- Twilight (Indecision Records, 2003) - CD/LP

=== EPs / Singles ===
- The Suicide File 7-inch/CDEP (2002) (Indecision Records, 2001/2002) - EP/CDEP
- The Suicide File / The Hope Conspiracy split 7-inch (Deathwish Inc., 2002) - EP
- The Suicide File / R'N'R split 7-inch (This Blessing, This Curse Recordings, 2002) - EP
- Things Fall Apart 7-inch (Indecision Records, 2003) - EP
- Live on WERS 7-inch (Lifeline Records, 2004) - EP

=== Compilation ===
- Some Mistakes You Never Stop Paying For (included demo and split-only releases) (Indecision Records, 2005) - CD/LP

=== Demos ===
- The Suicide File demo tape (self-released, 2001)
