= Baile de Los Locos =

Studio album by Voodoo Glow Skulls
- Released: May 5, 1997
- Recorded: Paramount Studios, Hollywood, California
- Genre: Ska punk
- Label: Epitaph
- Producer: Jim Goodwin

Voodoo Glow Skulls chronology
Firme (1995)	Baile de Los Locos (1997)	The Band Geek Mafia (1998)

Professional ratings
Review scores
Source	Rating
Allmusic	4/5 stars

Baile de Los Locos is Voodoo Glow Skulls' third full-length album. It was released on May 5, 1997. The album has 25 tracks; tracks 13–24 are left blank; track 25 is a cover of the Christmas song "Feliz Navidad" (Merry Christmas). The title translates as "Dance of the Crazy People".

== Track listing ==
All tracks are written by Frank Casillas and Eddie Casillas, except where noted.

No.	Title	Length
1.	"Baile de los Locos"
2.	"Here We Are Again"
3.	"My Soul Is Sick"
4.	"Bulletproof"
5.	"Elephantitis"
6.	"Los Hombres No Lloran"
7.	"Nazican"
8.	"Freeballin'"
9.	"Motel Six"
10.	"The Kids Will Have to Pay"
11.	"Nowhere Left to Go"
12.	"This Ain't No Disco"
25.	"Feliz Navidad (hidden track)" (José Feliciano)
