= Into the Valley of Death =

Studio album by Death By Stereo
- Released: April 22, 2003
- Recorded: Late 2002 – early 2003
- Genre: Hardcore punk
- Length: 37:36
- Label: Epitaph
- Producer: Death by Stereo

Death By Stereo chronology
Day of the Death (2001)	Into the Valley of Death (2003)	Death for Life (2005)

Professional ratings
Review scores
Source	Rating
AllMusic	4/5 stars

Into the Valley of Death is the third studio album by American hardcore punk band Death by Stereo. It was released on April 22, 2003, as their second album on Epitaph Records. The enhanced CD version of this album has a video for "Wasted Words" included.

== Track listing ==
All tracks are written by Death by Stereo.

No.	Title	Length
1.	"The Plague"	3:00
2.	"Beyond the Blinders"	3:39
3.	"Wasted Words"	3:36
4.	"I Wouldn't Piss in Your Ear if Your Brain Was on Fire"	2:18
5.	"Shh, It'll Be Our Little Secret"	3:08
6.	"What I Can't Hear, Touch, Taste, Smell or See Can't Hurt Me"	3:01
7.	"Unstoppable"	3:52
8.	"Let Down and Alone"	2:37
9.	"These Are a Few of My Favorite Things"	2:26
10.	"Good Morning America"	0:41
11.	"Flag Day"	2:44
12.	"You're a Bullshit Salesman with a Mouthful of Samples"	3:04
13.	"Wake Up, You're Dead"	3:27

== Personnel ==
=== Death by Stereo ===
- Efrem Schulz – vocals, additional guitar
- Dan Palmer – lead guitar, backing vocals
- Jim Miner – rhythm guitar, backing vocals
- Paul Miner – bass, backing vocals
- Todd Hennig – drums, backing vocals

=== Additional credits ===
- Tim "Tito" Owens – additional guitar
- Rob Aston, Ron Lomas, Vijay Kumar, Dave Itow, Dave Mandel, Shannon Dietz, Sid Dynamite, Benny Kane and Andrew Tabizon (additional vocals)
- Recorded at Sound City Studios and Death Tracks
- Mixed at For the Record
- Engineered by Paul Miner
- Assistant Engineered by Pete Martinez, Oliver and Efrem Schulz
- Mastered by Paul Miner at Q-Mark

Dave Mandel provided backing vocals on this album. He is the owner of Indecision Records, Death by Stereo's first label.
