= Voodoo Glow Skulls =

American ska punk band

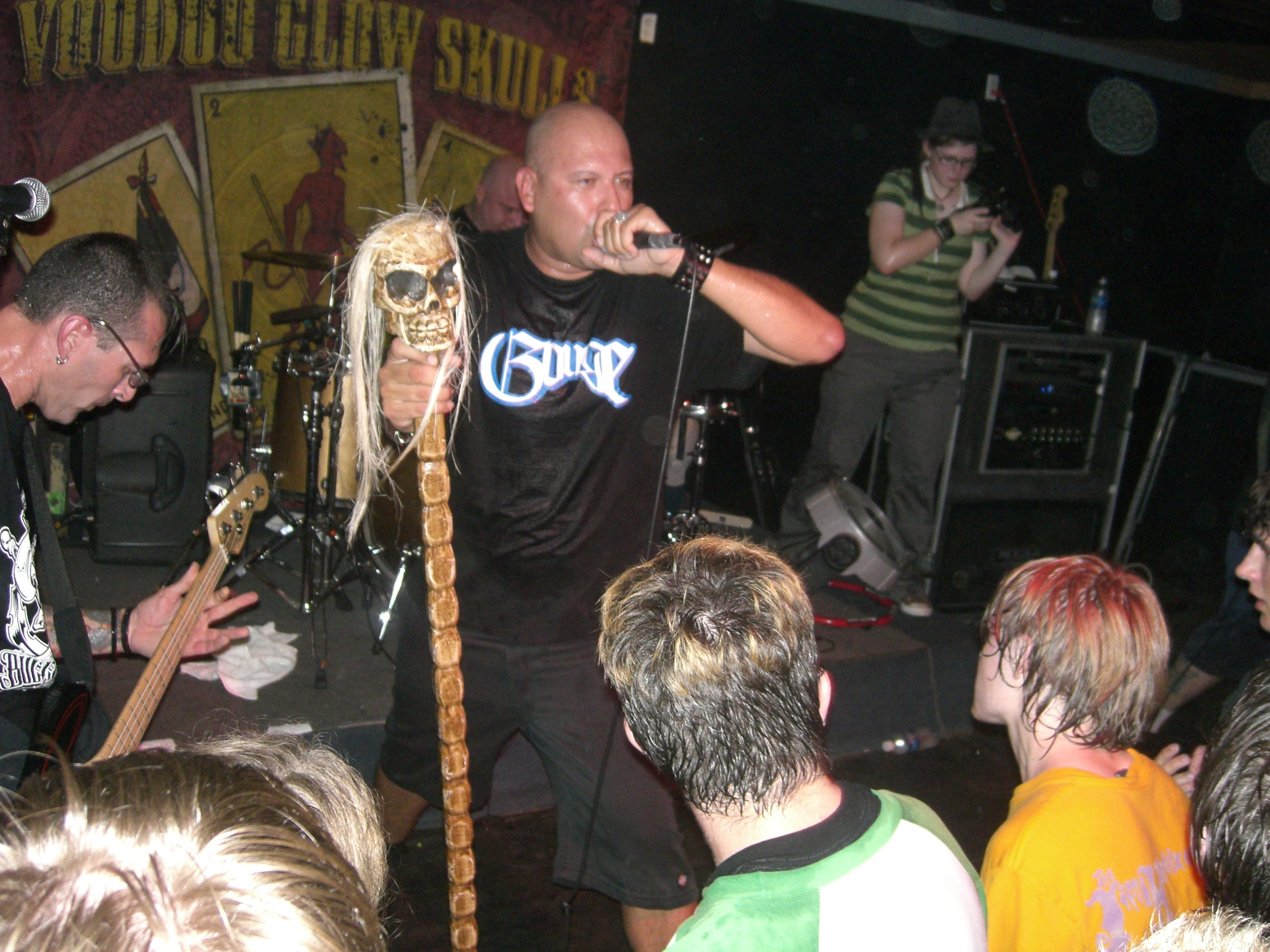
- Voodoo Glow Skulls in 2006

Background information
- Origin: Riverside, California
- Genre: Ska punk
- Years active: 1988–present
- Labels: Victory, Epitaph, Dr. Strange, Asian Man, Smelvis
- Members: Eddie Casillas; Jorge Casillas; Frank Casillas; Steve Reese; Adam Chavira; Ian Baroni
- Past members: Efrem Schulz; Jerry O'Neill; Chris Dalley; Vince Sollecito; Brodie Johnson; Ruben Durazo; Joe McNally; Helios Hernandez III; Mason Ball; Gabriel Dunn; Dan Albert; Mark Bush; Don Giese; Eric Fazzini; Jose Pazsoldan
- Website: https://www.voodooglowskullsofficial.com/index2.html

Voodoo Glow Skulls are an American ska punk band formed in 1988 in Riverside, California, by brothers Frank, Eddie, and Jorge Casillas and their longtime friend Jerry O'Neill. Voodoo Glow Skulls first played at backyard parties and later at Spanky's Café in their hometown of Riverside, where they played shows with the Angry Samoans, The Mighty Mighty Bosstones, Firehose, Murphy's Law, and The Dickies.

== History ==
Their first recording was in 1989 – a four-song demo on a four-track machine which they duplicated onto about sixty cassettes on a home stereo then sold at shows. In 1990, Voodoo Glow Skulls released their first 7-inch EP The Old of Tomorrow, a parody title inspired by the straight edge band named Youth of Today, with the help of local band Public Humiliation, and also booked their own DIY US tour.

In 1991, the band added a horn section to their live shows and recordings, due mostly to the influence of two of their favorite bands at the time, Fishbone and Red Hot Chili Peppers. The band's second independent release came out in 1992 with the Rasta Mis Huevos 7-inch EP for Signal Sound Systems Records. This label also released a glow-in-the-dark 12-inch EP titled We're Coloring Fun and the first release of The Potty Training Years on CD. Voodoo Glow Skulls recorded their debut album Who Is, This Is? for Dr. Strange Records in 1993, gaining the attention of Brett Gurewitz, owner of Epitaph Records.

The band then signed to Epitaph Records and released a further four albums. The band began to tour worldwide with their first European tour in 1996 followed by Japan, Australia, Mexico, and South America.

The band has been featured on several of Epitaph's Punk-O-Rama releases and has had music featured in video games, television and movies.

The song "Shoot the Moon" from the band's Firme album was used in the Pauly Shore movie Bio-Dome and the band's version of "Used to Love Her" (originally written and recorded by Guns N' Roses) is featured in the Mr. & Mrs. Smith soundtrack.

In 2002, Voodoo Glow Skulls signed to Victory Records. The band released three albums on the Victory label and continued to tour.

On January 18, 2012, the band released its self-produced ninth album, Break the Spell, through Smelvis Records.

The band contributed a song to the 2015 Rancid tribute compilation Hooligans United.

The band appeared as musical guests during the second season of Lucha Underground in 2016.

On June 3, 2017, Frank Casillas announced he was quitting Voodoo Glow Skulls, live on stage during a show at Alex's Bar in Long Beach, CA. The band has continued playing with Efrem Schulz from Death by Stereo on vocals. In 2021, the band released "Livin' the Apocalypse", their first release with Efrem Schulz on lead vocals. In September 2024, Efrem Schulz announced he was no longer a member of the band via his personal Instagram page. On September 30, Eddie and Jorge Casillas announced that Frank had rejoined the band and would join them for their October 5 performance at the Regent Theater in Los Angeles.

== Members ==
=== Current ===
- Frank Casillas – lead vocals
- Eddie Casillas – guitar
- Jorge Casillas – bass guitar
- Steve Reese – drums
- Adam Chavira – saxophone
- Ian Baroni – trombone

=== Former ===
- Efrem Schulz – vocals
- Jerry O'Neill – drums
- Brodie Johnson – trombone
- Helios Joey Hernandez – saxophone
- Chris Dalley – drums
- Vince Sollecito – drums
- AJ Condosta – drums
- Osh O'Loughlin - trombone
- Ruben Durazo – trombone
- Dan Albert – trombone
- Jose Pazsoldan – trombone
- Jay Armant – trombone
- Joe McNally – trumpet
- Mason Ball – trumpet
- Gabriel Dunn – trumpet
- Mark Bush – trumpet
- Don Giese – trumpet
- Jonathan Cestero – saxophone
- Eric Fazzini – saxophone

== Discography ==
=== Albums ===
- Who Is, This Is? – 1993 Dr. Strange Records
- Firme – 1995 Epitaph Records
- Firme (en Español) – 1996 Epitaph Records
- Baile de Los Locos – 1997 Epitaph Records
- The Band Geek Mafia – 1998 Epitaph Records
- Symbolic – 2000 Epitaph Records
- Steady as She Goes – 2002 Victory Records
- Adicción, Tradición, Revolución – 2004 Victory Records
- Southern California Street Music – 2007 Victory Records
- Break the Spell – 2012 Smelvis Records
- Livin' the Apocalypse – 2021 Dr. Strange Records

=== EPs ===
- The Old of Tomorrow 7-inch EP – 1990 Goon Records & Drapes
- Rasta Mis Huevos 7-inch EP – 1992 Signal Sound System Records
- We're Coloring Fun 12-inch EP – 1993 Signal Sound Systems Records
- Dogpile! 7-inch EP – 1993 Dr. Strange Records
- Land of Misfit Toys 7-inch EP – 1995 Dr. Strange Records

=== Voodoo Glow Skulls compilations ===
- The Potty Training Years – 1993 Signal Sound Systems Records
- Exitos Al Cabron – 1999 Grita Records
- The Potty Training Years 1988–1992 – 2000 El Pocho Loco Records

=== Compilations ===
- The Melting Pot – 1991 Sinbad Records
- Very Small World – 1992 Very Small World Records
- Welcome to Califucknia – 1992 Signal Sound Systems Records
- Misfits of Ska – 1995 Asian Man Records
- Nothing to Believe In – 1995 Know Records
- Punk Sucks – 1995 Liberation Records
- Punk-O-Rama Vol. 2 – 1996 Epitaph Records
- Give 'Em the Boot – 1997 Hellcat Records
- Cinema Beer Nuts – 1997 Hopeless Records
- Pure Eskañol: Latin Ska Underground – 1997 Aztlan Records
- We Are Not Devo – 1997 Centipede Records
- Godmoney: Motion Picture Soundtrack – 1997 V2 Records
- Punk-O-Rama Vol. 3 – 1998 Epitaph Records
- Skaliente – 1998 Grita! Records
- Ska: The Third Wave Vol. 4 – Punk It Up!! 1998 Beloved Records
- Punk-O-Rama Vol. 4 – 1999 Epitaph Records
- Of Things to Come – 1999 Better Youth Organization (BYO)
- Rebirth of the Loud – 2000 Priority Records
- Punk-O-Rama Vol. 5 – 2000 Epitaph Records
- Shut the Punk Up! Vol. 2 – 2001 New School Records!
- Punk-O-Rama Vol. 6 – 2001 Epitaph Records
- Know Your Skalphabet 2 – 2002 Good Clean Fun Records
- Dive into Disney – 2002 Walt Disney Records
- Victory Style 5 – 2002 Victory Records
- Still Standing – North American Ska Uprising – 2003 Jump Up Records
- Mr. & Mrs. Smith: Motion Picture Soundtrack – 2005 Lakeshore Records
- Forever Free A Sublime Tribute Album – 2006 Baseline Music Co.
- Ska is Dead – 2007 Asian Man Records
- Punk Rock Concoction Vol. 2 – 2008 Dimwit Records
- Kingrock Entertainment Vol. 1 – 2008
- Bienvenidos a Cafeina Riot Radio – 2009
- 2009 Vans Warped Tour Compilation – 2009 SideOneDummy Records
