= Death for Life =

Studio album by Death by Stereo
- Released: June 7, 2005
- Recorded: Late 2004 – early 2005
- Genre: Heavy metal, hardcore punk
- Length: 40:24
- Label: Epitaph
- Producer: The Factory, (Fred Archambault and Bruce MacFarlane)

Death by Stereo chronology
Into the Valley of Death (2003)	Death for Life (2005)	Death Alive (2007)

Professional ratings
Review scores
Source	Rating
AllMusic	4/5 stars

Death for Life is the fourth studio album by American hardcore punk band Death by Stereo, released on June 7, 2005.

This release is much heavier than any of Death By Stereo's previous work, but it also includes the first ever ballad-like Death By Stereo song, "Forever and a Day", which was also re-recorded for the band's following album, Death Is My Only Friend. The closing track on their second album "Day of the Death" has the same name as this album, "Death For Life".

== Track listing ==
No.	Title	Length
1.	"Binge / Purge"	2:35
2.	"I Give My Life"	3:23
3.	"Forget Regret"	4:03
4.	"Entombed We Collide" (feat. M. Shadows)	3:42
5.	"Forever and a Day"	5:05
6.	"This Curse of Days"	3:40
7.	"Middle Fingers"	3:42
8.	"Nosotros Controlamos Todo (Spanish for "We control everything")"	3:22
9.	"W.W.J.D.?"	3:20
10.	"Don't Piss on My Neck and Tell Me It's Raining"	3:08
11.	"This Is Not the End" (feat. M. Shadows)	4:25

All tracks written by Death by Stereo except "Entombed We Collide", being written by Death by Stereo and Mark Renk.

== Personnel ==
- Efrem Schulz - vocals
- Dan Palmer - lead guitar, backing vocals
- Tim "Tito" Owens - rhythm guitar, backing vocals
- Tyler Rebbe - bass guitar, backing vocals
- Todd Hennig - drums, backing vocals
- M. Shadows of Avenged Sevenfold (additional vocals, tracks 4 and 11)
- Scott Gilman (strings and programming)
- Derek Whitacre (live samples)
- Produced, mixed and recorded by The Factory (Fred Achambault and Bruce MacFarlane)
- Recorded at Sound City, Ton Recording and The Scene
- Mixed at Ton Recording and Al's Hobby Shop
- Assistant engineered by Pete Martinez (Sound City)
- Mastered by John Golden
- Artwork and design by Paul A. Romano
- Mark Renk – vocal coach
- Gardner Knutson – drum technician
