= Symbolic (Voodoo Glow Skulls album) =

Studio album by Voodoo Glow Skulls
- Released: September 12, 2000
- Genre: Ska punk
- Length: 49:59
- Label: Epitaph
- Producer: Brett Gurewitz

Voodoo Glow Skulls chronology
| The Band Geek Mafia (1998) | Symbolic (2000) | Steady as She Goes (2002) |

Professional ratings
Review scores
| Source | Rating |
|---|---|
| AllMusic | 3/5 stars |

Symbolic is the Voodoo Glow Skulls' fifth full-length album. It was released on September 12, 2000, on Epitaph Records. This album marks the band's last release on the label. Track 8 “El Mas Chingon” featuring a guitar solo by Reverend Horton Heat. Track 14 is a cover of the song "I Shot the Sheriff" from Bob Marley. The song "Say Goodnight" appears on punk compilation album Punk-O-Rama 6.

== Track listing ==
All tracks are written by Frank Casillas and Eddie Casillas, except where noted.

| No. | Title | Length |
|---|---|---|
| 1. | "We're Back (ft. Mark Adkins of Guttermouth)" | 3:45 |
| 2. | "Say Goodnight" | 3:04 |
| 3. | "The Drop In" | 3:35 |
| 4. | "Musical Therapy" | 3:32 |
| 5. | "Silencer" | 3:51 |
| 6. | "Orlando's Not Here" | 3:13 |
| 7. | "The Devil Made Me Do It" | 3:37 |
| 8. | "El Mas Chingon" | 3:29 |
| 9. | "Last Party" | 3:37 |
| 10. | "Symbolic" | 4:10 |
| 11. | "San Bernardino" | 3:13 |
| 12. | "Casa Blanca" | 4:04 |
| 13. | "Cancion De Mala Suerte" | 4:00 |
| 14. | "I Shot the Sheriff" (Bob Marley) | 2:51 |
