= Southern California Street Music =

Studio album by Voodoo Glow Skulls
- Released: September 18, 2007
- Genre: Ska punk
- Label: Victory

Voodoo Glow Skulls chronology
Adicción, Tradición, Revolución (2004)	Southern California Street Music (2007)	Break the Spell (2012)

Professional ratings
Review scores
Source	Rating
AllMusic	3/5 stars
Punknews.org	3.5/5 stars

Southern California Street Music is Voodoo Glow Skulls' eighth album, released on September 18, 2007, on Victory Records (VR 348).

Unlike most of the band's other albums, it doesn't contain any cover songs. All of its songs were written by Voodoo Glow Skulls.

== Track listing ==
No.	Title	Length
1.	"Exorcism"	2:24
2.	"Fire in the Dancehall"	2:58
3.	"The Ballad of Froggy McNasty"	3:19
4.	"Morning Air Raid Sirens"	3:11
5.	"Discombobulated"	2:38
6.	"Home Is Where the Heart[ache] Is"	2:30
7.	"While My City Sleeps"	3:03
8.	"Dancing on Your Grave"	2:07
9.	"When the World Stops Turning"	3:02
10.	"Southern California Street Music"	2:37
11.	"Death Wish List"	2:16
12.	"Say Hello to My Little Friend"	2:27
