= Some Mistakes You Never Stop Paying For =

Compilation album by The Suicide File
- Released: February 15, 2005
- Recorded: 2001 – 2003; The Outpost, Stoughton, Massachusetts; Atomic Recording Studio, Brooklyn, New York, US
- Genre: Hardcore punk
- Length: 32:36
- Label: Indecision Records
- Producer: Jim Siegel

The Suicide File chronology
Twilight (2003)	Some Mistakes You Never Stop Paying For (2005)

Professional ratings
Review scores
Source	Rating
Allmusic	link

Some Mistakes You Never Stop Paying For is an album from Boston, Massachusetts, hardcore punk band, The Suicide File. It was released in February 2005 on Indecision Records. The LP is a compilation of songs from the band's demo, two EPs, and several split EPs.

== Track listing ==
1. "2003" – 1:46
2. "Fuck Fox News" – 1:44
3. "I Like the Nightlife Baby" – 2:07
4. "Cold Snap" – 1:50
5. "Things Fall Apart" – 2:00
6. "Achtung! Landmine!" – 1:16
7. "Some Mistakes You Never Stop Paying For" – 2:45
8. "Ashcroft" – 1:36
9. "I Hate Rock N' Roll" – 1:04
10. "Purple Dawn" – 0:36
11. "Now Lie in It" – 1:22
12. "Kissinger" – 1:24
13. "Somme" – 1:26
14. "I Hate You" – 2:39
15. "Pleasure to Have in Class" – 2:26
16. "Kissinger" – 1:24
17. "I Hate You" – 3:13
18. "Another Night in America" – 1:58

Tracks 1–5 originally appeared on the "Things Fall Apart" EP. Tracks 6–7 originally appeared on the split EP with R'N'R. Tracks 8–9 originally appeared on the split EP with The Hope Conspiracy. Tracks 10–15 originally appeared on "The Suicide File" EP. Tracks 16–18 originally appeared on the band's demo.

== Credits ==
- Dave Weinberg – vocals
- Neeraj Kane – guitar
- Jason C. – guitar
- John Carpenter – bass
- Jarrod Alexander – drums
- Jimmy Carroll – guitar
- Recorded 2001 – 2003 at The Outpost, Stoughton, Massachusetts and Atomic Recording Studio, Brooklyn, New York, US
- Produced by Jim Siegel
- Engineered by Jim Siegel, Kurt Ballou, and Dean Baltulonis
