= If Looks Could Kill, I'd Watch You Die =

If Looks Could Kill I'd Watch You Die

Studio album by Death by Stereo
- Released: May 18, 1999
- Recorded: 1998
- Genre: Hardcore punk
- Length: 31:34
- Label: Indecision
- Producer: Death by Stereo

Death by Stereo chronology
If Looks Could Kill I'd Watch You Die (1999)	Day of the Death (2001)

If Looks Could Kill I'd Watch You Die is the debut studio album by American hardcore punk band Death by Stereo, released in 1999 via Indecision Records. The introductory track is a sound-bite from the film The Lost Boys, of which the band's name is also derived.

== Track listing ==
No.	Title	Length
1.	"Intro"	0:22
2.	"Sing Along with the Patriotic Punks"	2:32
3.	"No Cuts, No Butts, No Coconuts"	2:23
4.	"Sow the Seeds"	2:02
5.	"Sticks and Bones"	1:58
6.	"Bet Against Me, You Lose"	2:21
7.	"1 Legged Man in an Ass Kicking Contest"	2:26
8.	"A Day in the Sun"	1:57
9.	"Lookin' Out for #1"	2:21
10.	"Turn the Page"	3:09
11.	"Death Conspiracy"	2:37
12.	"Don't Believe Everything You Think"	1:58
13.	"Fooled by your Smile"	2:02
14.	"Home of the Brave"	3:21

== Band line-up ==
- Efrem Schulz - vocals
- Keith Barney - lead guitar, backing vocals
- Jim Miner - rhythm guitar, Backing vocals
- Paul Miner - bass, backing vocals
- Jarrod Alexander - drums, backing vocals

=== Additional credits ===
- Backing vocals by Dave Itow, Dave Mandel, Rob Milburn, Brad Doerges, Nick Radeleff, and Death by Stereo
- Produced by Death by Stereo
- Engineered by Paul Miner
- Mastered by Charlie Watts
- Layout and design by Paul Miner
- All songs by Death by Stereo; tracks 3, 5, 6, 7, 8, 9, 11, 12, 13 with Ian Fowles (ex-guitarist who left shortly before recording)
- Recorded at For the Record Studios in Orange County, California
