= Twilight (The Suicide File album) =

Studio album by The Suicide File
- Released: January 28, 2003
- Recorded: July–September 2002
- Studios: The Atomic Recording Company, Brooklyn, New York
- Genre: Hardcore punk
- Length: 17:43
- Label: Indecision Records
- Producers: Dean Baltulonis, The Suicide File

The Suicide File chronology
The Suicide File (2002)	Twilight (2003)	Some Mistakes You Never Stop Paying For (2005)

Professional ratings
Review scores
Source	Rating
AllMusic	link
Lambgoat	link

Twilight is the only album by American hardcore punk band The Suicide File. It was released in January 2003 on Indecision Records.

== Track listing ==
1. "Twilight" – 1:31
2. "The Edge of Town" – 1:24
3. "Rum, Romanism and Tammany" – 1:06
4. "W" – 1:24
5. "Ashcroft" – 1:26
6. "Laramie" – 1:32
7. "Song for Katy" – 2:03
8. "Down Underground" – 0:49
9. "Mission Hill Party" – 1:15
10. "November in Brookline" – 2:12
11. "Song for Tonight" – 3:01

== Credits ==
- Dave Weinberg – vocals
- Neeraj Kane – guitar
- Jason Correia – guitar
- John Carpenter – bass
- Jarrod Alexander – drums
- Recorded Jul – Sep, 2002 at The Atomic Recording Company, Brooklyn, New York
- Produced by Dean Baltulonis and The Suicide File
