= Fall from Grace (EP) =

Fall From Grace 7-inch

EP by Ensign
- Released: June 1997
- Recorded: 1997
- Studio: New Jersey
- Genre: Hardcore punk
- Length: 8:13
- Label: Indecision Records
- Producer: Pete Koller

Ensign chronology
Self-Titled 7-inch EP (1996)	Fall From Grace 7-inch (1997)	Direction of Things to Come (1997)

Ensign's second 7-inch EP for Indecision Records followed their self-titled 7-inch debut from May, 1996. It was released in June, 1997, on 7-inch vinyl only. The production run was limited to 4239 on black vinyl, 600 green, 225 white, 106 orange and a further 100 on black vinyl with a different cover to coincide with a European tour. This was inline with Indecision Records tradition of putting out releases by new bands on colored and normal vinyl and was carried through to their next release, Direction of Things to Come. It was later re-released on CD as part of a retrospective compilation, Three Years Two Months Eleven Days, in April 2000 after the band had left to join Nitro Records in 1998.

== Overview ==
Although two members had been replaced since the self-titled EP – drummer Chris Ross had been replaced by Ryan Murphy and bassist Walt Svekla by Nate Gluck – this did little to deter them from pursuing the short, sharp hardcore punk which would be their trademark in the years at Indecision Records. Three original songs are followed by a cover version of Instead's "We'll Make A Difference", all in the style of New York hardcore genre.

== Track listing ==
1. "Fall From Grace" (Ensign) – 1:57
2. "Uncommon Bond" (Ensign) – 2:28
3. "MPSR" (Ensign) – 1:56
4. "We'll Make A Difference" (Insted) – 2:46

== Credits ==
- Tim Shaw – vocals
- John Fraunberger – guitar
- Nate "Edge" Gluck – bass
- Ryan Murphy – drums
- Recorded "somewhere in New Jersey", USA
- Produced by Pete Koller
- Mixed by Noah Evans
