= Adicción, Tradición, Revolución =

Studio album by Voodoo Glow Skulls
- Released: November 2, 2004
- Recorded: Dog Run Studios, Riverside, California
- Genre: Ska punk
- Label: Victory

Voodoo Glow Skulls chronology
Steady as She Goes (2002)	Adicción, Tradición, Revolución (2004)	Southern California Street Music (2007)

Professional ratings
Review scores
Source	Rating
Allmusic	4/5 stars

Adicción, Tradición, Revolución is the Voodoo Glow Skulls' seventh full-length album. It was released on November 2, 2004, on Victory Records. The song "Used to Love Her" is a cover song of the original by Guns N' Roses.

== Track listing ==
No.	Title	Length
1.	"Ghettoblaster"
2.	"Adicción, Tradición, Revolución"
3.	"Mayhem and Murder"
4.	"Smile Now, Cry Later"
5.	"DD Don't Like Ska"
6.	"Día De Los Muertos"
7.	"Eville"
8.	"Cochino"
9.	"Disaster"
10.	"Musical Pollution"
11.	"We Represent"
12.	"Enter the Dragon"
13.	"Bastard Music"
14.	"Used to Love Her"
