= Break the Spell (Voodoo Glow Skulls album) =

Studio album by Voodoo Glow Skulls
- Released: January 17, 2012
- Genre: Rock, punk, ska punk
- Label: Smelvis Records

Voodoo Glow Skulls chronology
Southern California Street Music (2007)	Break the Spell (2012)

Break the Spell is the ninth studio album from Voodoo Glow Skulls, released January 17, 2012 on Smelvis Records. It was recorded in a home studio and took four years to make.

== Track listing ==
No.	Title	Length
1.	"Intro"	2:36
2.	"Don't Jump the Gun"	2:49
3.	"Police Knocking on My Door"	2:37
4.	"Creep Tonight"	3:05
5.	"Knucklehead"	3:11
6.	"Haunt You"	2:38
7.	"Bro Truck"	2:17
8.	"Dead Soldiers"	3:01
9.	"Long Way Home"	1:42
10.	"Static on My Radio"	2:36
11.	"Puro Desmadre"	1:59
12.	"Unlucky Bastard"	2:21
13.	"My Girlfriend Is a Chola"	0:50
14.	"The Resurrection"	3:20
