= Three Years Two Months Eleven Days =

Compilation album by Ensign
- Released: April 2000
- Recorded: January 1996 – July 1998
- Studio: New Jersey; Staten Island; Corona, California
- Genre: Hardcore punk
- Length: 46:57
- Label: Indecision Records
- Producer: Ensign, Pete Koller

Ensign chronology
Cast the First Stone (1999)	Three Years Two Months Eleven Days (2000)	For What It's Worth (2000)

Professional ratings
Review scores
Source	Rating
Kerrang!	3/5 stars

Three Years Two Months Eleven Days was an album of early material, often referred to as a retrospective, by the American band Ensign. Recorded in various sessions between January 1996 and July 1998 – including a live recording – and with varying members, it was released by the band's first record label, Indecision Records, in April 2000.

== Overview ==
Ensign had recorded two EPs – a self-titled 7-inch and the Fall from Grace 7-inch – and a full-length debut, Direction of Things to Come, for Orange County, California label Indecision Records before departing for the larger Nitro Records in 1998. Far from seeing this as a cashing-in exercise by Indecision on the band's new, wider audience, it was seen as filling the gaps in the essential history of a band who would go on to tour with metalcore band, Hatebreed in 2002. Most of the material was either unreleased, out-of-print or very rare.

Style-wise, it was more akin to Direction of Things to Come than anything they did subsequently on either Nitro Records or Blackout Records. Straightforward, short blasts of hardcore punk in the New York hardcore mould that they had imported to the Californian shores in 1995.

== Track listing ==
All songs written by Ensign, unless stated.

1. "Alzheimers" – 1:24
2. "Pale Horse" – 2:28
3. "Trying Again" (Ensign, Ron Wood) – 1:56
4. "Enemy of My Enemy" – 2:46
5. "Standing" – 2:25
6. "MPSR" – 1:54
7. "Blue Skies" – 3:22
8. "Fall from Grace" – 1:57
9. "Uncommon Bond" – 2:09
10. "MPSR #2" – 1:49
11. "We'll Make the Difference" (Insted) – 2:18
12. "Hold" – 2:02
13. "Say It" (Underdog) – 2:10
14. "Tourniquet" – 1:50
15. "Where Did We Go Wrong" – 1:48
16. "Fade into Years" – 1:51
17. "Target" – 1:52
18. "Intro" – 1:23
19. "Page 32" – 2:18
20. "Day by Day" – 1:36
21. "Revolutions End" – 1:04
22. "First, Last, Only" – 2:36
23. "Foundation" – 2:01
- Tracks 1 – 4 were originally from the self-titled 7-inch EP released in May 1996
- Tracks 5 – 7 were previously unreleased, but were recorded in the same session as the self-titled 7-inch EP
- Tracks 8 – 11 were originally from the 7-inch Fall from Grace EP released in June 1997
- Track 11 is a cover version of a song by Insted. It was also re-recorded for the 2003 cover album, Love the Music, Hate the Kids
- Tracks 12 and 13 were previously unreleased, but were recorded in the same session as the Fall from Grace 7-inch EP
- Track 13 is a cover version of a song by Underdog. It was also re-recorded for the 2003 cover album, Love the Music, Hate the Kids
- Tracks 14 – 17 were all previously unreleased
- Tracks 2 and 16 were reprised and appeared on Cast the First Stone in March 1999
- Tracks 12, 14 and 15 were reprised and appeared on Direction of Things to Come in November 1997
- Tracks 18 –23 are live recordings of songs which were on Direction of Things to Come

== Credits ==
- Tim Shaw – vocals (all tracks)
- John Fraunberger – guitar (tracks 1–15)
- Ryan "Mackenzie" Donoghue – guitar (tracks 16–23)
- Walt Svekla – bass (tracks 1–7)
- Nate "Edge" Gluck – bass (tracks 8–23)
- Chris Ross – drums (tracks 1–7)
- Ryan Murphy – drums (tracks 8–23)

=== Tracks 1–7 ===
- Recorded January 11–15, 1996 at Sweetwood Sound, New Jersey
- Produced by Sick of It All's Pete Koller
- Engineered by Alap Momin and Keith Deblasi

=== Tracks 8–13 ===
- Recorded 1996 in New Jersey
- Produced by Sick of It All's Pete Koller
- Mixed by Noah Evans

=== Tracks 14–15 ===
- Recorded at John's Place, Staten Island, New York

=== Tracks 16–17 ===
- Recorded in November 1997 at Third Studio from the Sun, Wayne, New Jersey
- Engineered by Dave Meyer

=== Tracks 18–23 ===
- Lance Wells (guest vocals)
- Recorded live on July 25, 1998, at the Showcase Theater, Corona, California
