= The Band Geek Mafia =

Studio album by Voodoo Glow Skulls
- Released: July 14, 1998
- Recorded: February–March 1998
- Genre: Ska punk
- Length: 44:14
- Label: Epitaph
- Producers: Donnell Cameron; John Avila

Voodoo Glow Skulls chronology
| Baile de Los Locos (1997) | The Band Geek Mafia (1998) | Symbolic (2000) |

Professional ratings
Review scores
| Source | Rating |
|---|---|
| AllMusic | 4/5 stars |

The Band Geek Mafia is Voodoo Glow Skulls' fourth full-length album. It was released on July 14, 1998 on Epitaph Records. All songs were written by Voodoo Glow Skulls except "Stranded in the Jungle", written by James Johnson and Ernestine Smith. The song "Stranded in the Jungle" appears on punk compilation album Punk-O-Rama 5, "They Always Come Back" appears on Punk-O-Rama 4, and "Delinquent Song" appears on Punk-O-Rama 3. The song "Symptomatic" was in ESPN X Games Pro Boarder for the PS1.

== Track listing ==
All tracks are written by Frank Casillas and Eddie Casillas, except where noted.

| No. | Title | Length |
|---|---|---|
| 1. | "Human Piñata" | 2:47 |
| 2. | "Symptomatic" | 2:57 |
| 3. | "Love Letter" | 2:52 |
| 4. | "They Always Come Back" | 3:23 |
| 5. | "Walkin' Frustration" | 3:21 |
| 6. | "Yo No Tengo Tiempo" | 2:12 |
| 7. | "Left For Dead" | 3:57 |
| 8. | "The Band Geek Mafia" | 3:35 |
| 9. | "Brodie Johnson Weekend" | 3:22 |
| 10. | "Delinquent Song" | 3:15 |
| 11. | "Hieroglyphics" | 3:55 |
| 12. | "Misunderstood" | 3:13 |
| 13. | "Hit A Guy With Glasses" | 2:19 |
| 14. | "Stranded In The Jungle" (J. Johnson, E. Smith) | 3:07 |

== Personnel ==
- Frank Casillas: Vocal
- Eddie Casillas: Guitars
- Sam Avila: Organ
- Andy Kaulkin: Piano
- Kristo Panos: Theremin
- Joey Hernandez: Sax
- Brodie Johnson: Trombone
- Joe McNally: Trumpet
- Jorge Casillas: Bass
- Jerry O'Neill: Drums
- Ray Salis: Percussion
