= The Price of Progression (Ensign album) =

Studio album by Ensign
- Released: April 2001
- Recorded: 20 November – 15 December 2000; Trax East, S River, New Jersey, U.S.
- Genre: Hardcore punk
- Length: 37:59
- Label: Nitro Records
- Producer: Eric Rachel; Nate Gluck

Ensign chronology
Death By Stereo/Ensign Split 7" (EP) (2000)	The Price of Progression (2001)	Love the Music, Hate the Kids (2003)

Professional ratings
Review scores
Source	Rating
Punknews	4/5 stars
AllMusic	2/5 stars

The Price of Progression is the third full-length album by the New Jersey, U.S. band, Ensign. It follows the 1999 release of Cast the First Stone and was recorded in November and December 2000 for an April 2001 release by Indecision Records.

== Overview ==
Ensign had emerged from a period of personnel turmoil to record this album and it was left to the bass guitarist and main songwriter, Nate Gluck, to also take on the guitar work. The result was a more refined offering which moved sufficiently away from hardcore punk to be recognised in the same circle as some metalcore bands while still retaining the theatrical restraint and lyrical ethics of the hardcore genre. The songs were still short, although many were nearer the three-minute mark than ever before – resulting in the band's longest album ever – but they had more structure and melodic elements than material on either Cast the First Stone or Direction of Things to Come.

== Track listing ==
- All songs written by Ensign
1. "The Spark" – 2:03
2. "Black Clouds vs. Silver Linings" – 2:16
3. "While The Iron Is Hot" – 2:52
4. "Lesser Of Two" – 1:45
5. "Absolute Zero" – 0:34
6. "Grasping At Straws" – 2:31
7. "Foot In Mouth As An Artform" – 2:55
8. "Everything You Ever Love" – 2:49
9. "Slow Burn" – 3:58
10. "Never Go Home Again" – 2:31
11. "How To Bleed" – 1:33
12. "The May Conspiracy" – 1:46
13. "33 1/3" – 2:29
14. "Cast In Shadows" – 2:15
15. "Stay Warm" – 2:02
16. "Sworntosecrecy" – 1:37
17. "File Under Misunderstood" – 2:05
- Track 10 is a reprise of a track which previously appeared on the Death By Stereo/Ensign Split 7" (EP) recorded in June 2000 and released by Indecision Records in December 2000.
- Track 13 is followed by 47 seconds of strange sound effects before the next track starts.

== Credits ==
- Tim Shaw – vocals
- Nate "Edge" Gluck – guitar, bass guitar
- Chris Byrnes – guitar
- John "Vince Vegas" O'Neill – drums
- Good Riddance's Russ Rankin – guest vocals on "Foot In Mouth As An Artform"
- Kill Your Idol's Andy West – guest vocals on "Stay Warm"
- Recorded November 20 – December 15, 2000, at Trax East, South River, New Jersey, USA
- Produced by Eric Rachel and Nate Gluck
- Engineered and mixed by Eric Rachel
- Mastered by Alan Douches at West West Side Music, New Jersey
- The producer, Eric Rachel played bass guitar in rehearsals for "Cast In Shadows"
- Chris Oliver played bass guitar in rehearsals while Gluck recorded the guitar track
