= Cast the First Stone (Ensign album) =

Studio album by Ensign
- Released: March 1999
- Recorded: Trax East, South River, New Jersey
- Genre: Hardcore punk
- Length: 27:53
- Label: Nitro Records
- Producer: Steve Evetts

Ensign chronology
Direction of Things to Come (1997)	Cast the First Stone (1999)	Three Years Two Months Eleven Days (2000)

Professional ratings
Review scores
Source	Rating
AllMusic	3/5 stars

Cast the First Stone was the second full-length album by American band Ensign. It was released by Nitro Records in March 1999 and follows the band's debut, Direction of Things to Come which came out on Indecision Records in November 1997.

== Overview ==
The combination of a move to a bigger record label and a different guitarist from their previous album did little to alter the band's sound. It was a short, frenetic-paced collection of songs again. The tracks in the early part of the album are straightforward hardcore punk with less inclination to include slower refrain sections – referred to as breakdowns – than in previous recordings. This resulted in the tracks sounding faster. The latter part of the album showed signs that the band was including more metalcore elements into their sound. They would develop this tendency towards a more metalcore sound in their subsequent release, The Price of Progression.

== Track listing ==
All songs written by Ensign.

1. "Silent Weapons for Quiet Wars" – 2:17
2. "#22" – 1:32
3. "15 Years" – 1:23
4. "Wash Away" – 1:12
5. "Fade into Years" – 1:48
6. "Waiting for the Breakdown" – 1:01
7. "Absent" – 1:51
8. "For the Record" – 1:55
9. "Winner Takes All" – 0:57
10. "Never Give In" – 2:19
11. "Pale Horse" – 2:27
12. "Unanswered" – 1:49
13. "DBC" – 0:35
14. "Cornered" – 1:40
15. "The Road Less Travelled" – 2:15
16. "Fallen" – 2:52
- Track 5 is a reprise of a song which was originally recorded in 1997 and not released
- Track 11 is a reprise of the song which appeared on the band's first, self-titled, 7-inch EP
- Tracks 5 and 11 can be found in their original form on the retrospective Indecision Records release Three Years Two Months Eleven Days

== Credits ==
- Tim Shaw – vocals
- Ryan "Mackenzie" Donoghue – guitar
- Nate "Edge" Gluck – bass
- Ryan Murphy – drums
- Sick of It All's Lou Koller provided guest vocals on "15 Years"
- Recorded at Trax East, South River, New Jersey
- Produced and engineered by Steve Evetts
- Assistant producers: Lou and Pete Koller of Sick of It All
- Mastered by Alan Douches at West West Side Music
