= Jarrod Alexander =

American drummer (born 1981)

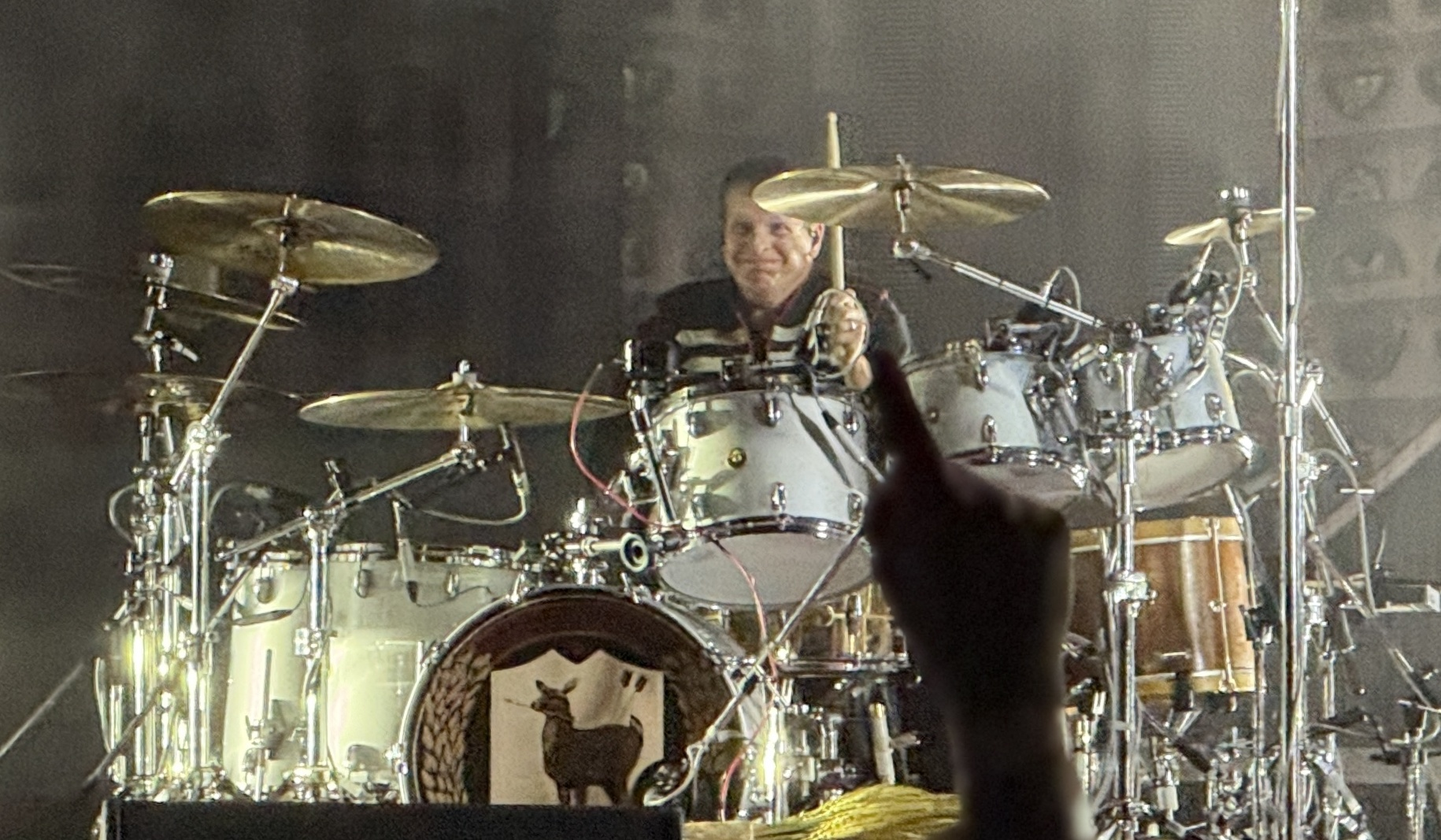
- Alexander with My Chemical Romance in 2025

Background information
- Born: Jarrod Fletcher Alexander; August 13, 1981 (age 45); Jackson, Mississippi, U.S.
- Genres: Post-hardcore; pop-punk; alternative rock; emo; hardcore punk; punk rock
- Occupation: Drummer
- Years active: 1996–present
- Formerly of: A Static Lullaby; Dead Country; The Suicide File
- Website: jarrodfletcheralexander.com

Jarrod Fletcher Alexander (born August 13, 1981) is an American drummer who has played with many hardcore punk bands. He has been a member of the Suicide File, a Static Lullaby, Dead Country and more recently, My Chemical Romance, Alkaline Trio, Matt Skiba, Meg Myers and Necessary Noise.

== Early life ==
Alexander started playing the drums in his early teens. He went to Berklee College of Music and graduated in 2003.

== Career ==
Alexander has played the drums for several bands throughout his career. He was the original drummer for Death By Stereo, who appeared on the band's first album If Looks Could Kill, I'd Watch You Die. He left the band in 2000, but rejoined it in 2006 to record a new album.

He performed drums on the American Nightmare album Background Music. He toured Europe drumming for the Vandals in 2001, before touring with Jamison Parker in 2004. Alexander played the drums on Hunter Revenge's 2007 tour as well as performing with Only Crime in 2007.

In September 2011, Alexander filled in as the drummer for My Chemical Romance on their "Honda Civic tour", after touring drummer Michael Pedicone was fired after being caught stealing from the band. Alexander has continued to play with My Chemical Romance into 2012, including their appearances on the Australian Big Day Out tour dates and their final show at Bamboozle Festival. After their last concert, he stayed with the band and also recorded "Fake Your Death" until the band broke up in 2013. He's also contributed to My Chemical Romance members Gerard Way, Ray Toro and Frank Iero's respective solo projects, after the breakup of the band.

In 2014, Alexander became a permanent member for the Hormones, the backing band for Gerard Way. He performed drums and is credited on Way's solo release, Hesitant Alien. From October 2014 until October 2015, Alexander played on a global tour supporting the record. He also played other dates with Way such as the Australian Soundwave music festivals, as well as the Boston Calling Music Festival in May 2015.

In October 2019, My Chemical Romance announced a reunion show, with Alexander returning on drums. He was the drummer for the band's reunion tour, which commenced in 2022 after being postponed for two years due to the COVID-19 pandemic. Despite Alexander's tenure with My Chemical Romance, it has been acknowledged that the band has not had a full time drummer since Bob Bryar's departure in 2010.

Recently, Alexander has also done drum work and toured for indie-pop act Meg Myers and is currently working on new music with pop-punk act "Necessary Noise". Jarrod plays all instruments in his own project called All Veins.

== Equipment ==
Alexander endorses Gretsch drums, Remo drumheads, Istanbul Agop cymbals and Vic Firth drumsticks. He also uses Ludwig pedals and hardware. Prior to Gretsch, Alexander endorsed Craviotto drums.

Alexander usually favors a standard setup consisting of a bass drum, snare drum, rack tom and one or two floor toms.

Drums: Gretsch

Drumheads: Remo:

- Snare: Controlled Sound Coated
- Toms: Coated Emperors/Controlled Sound Clear Black Dot
- Kick: Varies, usually Powerstroke P3 Clear

Cymbals: Istanbul Agop:

- 15" Xist Power Hi-Hats
- 22" Xist Power crash
- 24" Xist Ride
- 22" Xist Power crash

Drumsticks: Vic Firth:

- Vic Firth Rock Wood tip drumsticks

Pedals/hardware: Ludwig:

- Uses pedals and hardware from Ludwig's Axis series.

== Discography ==
with D-Cons

- Fed Up Demo Tape – 1996 (self released)
- Can't Pull My Strings 7-inch ep – 1997 (Slow Gun Records)
- The Operation Room ep cdep – 1998 (Slow Gun Records) limited release

with Death By Stereo

- Demo Cassette (1998, Dental Records)
- Fooled By Your Smile 7-inch (1998, Dental Records)
- If Looks Could Kill, I'd Watch You Die (1999, Indecision Records)
- Death Is My Only Friend (2009, Serjical Strike)

with Adamantium

- When It Rains, It Pours (Indecision ReMcords)
- Bane/Adamantium split 7-inch with Bane (2001, Indecision Records)

with the Suicide File

- "The Suicide File" demo tape – 2001
- "The Suicide File" 7-inch – 2001 (Indecision Records)
- The Suicide File (2002)
- "The Suicide File/The Hope Conspiracy" split 7-inch – 2002 (Deathwish Inc.)
- "The Suicide File/R'N'R" split 7-inch – 2002 (This Blessing, This Curse)
- "Things Fall Apart" 7-inch – 2003 (Indecision Records)
- "Live On WERS" 7-inch – 2004 (Lifeline Records)
- Things Fall Apart (2003)
- Twilight (2003)
- Some Mistakes You Never Stop Paying For (2005)

with the Hope Conspiracy

- "The Suicide File/The Hope Conspiracy" split 7-inch – 2002 (Deathwish Inc.)
- Endnote (2002, Equal Vision Records)

with American Nightmare

- Background Music (2003, Equal Vision Records, Burning Heart Records)

with Throwdown

- Haymaker (2003, Trustkill Records)
- Deathless (2009, eOne Music)
- Intolerance (2014, eOne Music)

with Bars

- Introducing... (2004, Equal Vision Records)

with a Static Lullaby

- A Static Lullaby (2006, Fearless Records)

with When Tigers Fight

- Ghost Story (2006, Indecision Records)

with Rogue Sounds

- Jupiter and Beyond the Infinite (2012)

with Downburst

- Abandon Balance (2012) – Drum Tech

with Frank Iero

- This Song Is a Curse (2012, Walt Disney)
- Stomachaches (album) (2014, Staple Records / Hassle Records)

with My Chemical Romance

- "Fake Your Death" (2014, Warner Bros Records)
- "The Foundations of Decay" (2022, Reprise Records)

with Gerard Way

- Hesitant Alien (2014, Warner Bros Records)

with Matt Skiba & The Sekrets

- Babylon (2012, Superball Music)
- Kuts (2015, Superball Music)
