= Steady as She Goes (Voodoo Glow Skulls album) =

Studio album by Voodoo Glow Skulls
- Released: July 2, 2002
- Recorded: Dog Run Studios, Riverside, California
- Genre: Ska punk
- Length: 38:17
- Label: Victory
- Producer: Voodoo Glow Skulls

Voodoo Glow Skulls chronology
Symbolic (2000)	Steady as She Goes (2002)	Adicción, Tradición, Revolución (2004)

Professional ratings
Review scores
Source	Rating
AllMusic	2.5/5 stars

Steady as She Goes is the Voodoo Glow Skulls' sixth full-length album. It was released on July 2, 2002, on Victory Records.

== Track listing ==
No.	Title	Length
1.	"Voodoo Anthem"	2:32
2.	"Steady as She Goes"	2:55
3.	"Nada En La Cabeza"	2:45
4.	"High Society"	3:10
5.	"One for the Road"	3:19
6.	"Ethnic Cleansing Day"	2:18
7.	"Interstate Disease"	2:53
8.	"La Llorona"	2:57
9.	"The Rat Traps"	3:12
10.	"Tell the People"	3:35
11.	"New Jerk Swing"	3:34
12.	"The Basketball Song"	2:21
13.	"Little Red Riding Hood" (Bonus Track)	2:46
