= Ensign (EP) =

Self-titled EP 7-inch

EP by Ensign
- Released: May 1996
- Recorded: 11 January – 15, 1996; Sweetwood Sound, New Jersey
- Genre: Hardcore punk
- Length: 8:34
- Label: Indecision Records
- Producer: Pete Koller

Ensign chronology
Self-titled EP 7-inch (1996)	Fall from Grace 7-inch EP (1997)

Ensign's self-titled 7-inch EP was their first release on Orange County, California, record label, Indecision Records. It was released in May, 1996 on 7-inch vinyl only. The production run was limited to 3336 on black vinyl, 330 on grey, 449 on blue and a further 100 on black vinyl with a different cover to coincide with a European tour. This was in line with Indecision Records tradition of putting out releases by new bands on colored and normal vinyl and was carried through to their next release, the Fall from Grace (EP). It was later re-released on CD as part of a retrospective compilation, Three Years Two Months Eleven Days, in April 2000 after the band had left to join Nitro Records in 1998.

== Overview ==
Although the band had relocated to California in 1995, and subsequently signed to an independent label there, their musical roots were firmly back in New Jersey, or more specifically the New York hardcore scene. The songs were short and played at a frenetic pace, with ample use of a refrain, known in the genre as a breakdown. This was to be their sound throughout their stay of three years at Indecision Records.

== Track listing ==
1. "Alzheimers" (Ensign) – 1:24
2. "Pale Horse" (Ensign) – 2:28
3. "Trying Again" (Ensign, Ron Wood) – 1:56
4. "Enemy Of My Enemy" (Ensign) – 2:46

== Credits ==
- Tim Shaw – vocals
- John Fraunberger – guitar
- Walt Svekla – bass
- Chris Ross – drums
- Recorded January 11 – 15, 1996 at Sweetwood Sound, New Jersey, USA
- Produced by Pete Koller
- Engineered Alap Momin assisted by Keith Deblasi
