= Fig.4.0 =

English hardcore punk band

Fig 4.0
- Origin: England, UK
- Genres: Hardcore punk, thrashcore, melodic hardcore
- Years active: 1999–2004
- Label: Bombed Out
- Members: Joseph Alderdice; Richard Storrow; Matt Coy; Stephen Hastewell
- Past members: Andrew Kidd
- Website: bombedout.com/fig.-4.0

Fig 4.0 (pronounced "Figure Four") were a hardcore punk band from Leeds and Harrogate, England, formed in 1999 from the remnants of skacore act "Tinker's Rucksack". 2001 saw the release of the album Action Image Exchange which presented a series of short, sharp hardcore punk songs, characterising the band's sound. After several years as popular stars of the DIY/underground punk rock scene and growing underground success in the United States, the band split in 2004.

Alderdice and Hastewell went on to form the band The Dauntless Elite. Coy is currently playing in the band Himself.

== Musical style ==
The band have been categorised as hardcore punk, thrashcore and melodic hardcore. At times their music borders the sound of pop punk and rock and roll. Their music makes use of extremely high tempos contrasted with slower subdued ones and melodic guitar lines. Bombed Out records have described their vocal melodies as "left-field" and compared them to those of Dillinger Four.

== Members ==
Final line-up

- Joe Alderdice - guitar, lead vocals (1999–2004)
- Richard Storrow – guitar (2004)
- Matt Coy - bass, backing vocals (1999–2004)
- Steve Hastewell - drums (1999–2004)

Previous members

- Andrew Kidd - guitar, backing vocals (1999–2004)

== Discography ==
=== EPs ===
- The Path the World Must Take to Avoid Total Annihilation (2000)
- Ctrl+Alt+Del (2000)

=== Albums ===
- Action Image Exchange (2001)

=== Split EPs ===
- With Ensign (2002)
- With Stand (2003)
- With Twofold (2004)
