= Direction of Things to Come =

Studio album by Ensign
- Released: November 1997
- Recorded: June 1997; Trax East, S River, New Jersey
- Genre: Hardcore punk
- Length: 27:42
- Label: Indecision Records
- Producer: Ensign & Steve Evetts

Ensign chronology
Fall from Grace 7-inch EP (1997)	Direction of Things to Come (1997)	Cast the First Stone (1999)

Professional ratings
Review scores
Source	Rating
Allmusic	4/5 stars

Direction of Things to Come was the debut full-length album from New Jersey hardcore punk band Ensign. It was released on Indecision Records in November, 1997, and it followed two 7-inch vinyl EPs. As well as being released on CD, Indecision Records continued their tradition of making limited edition vinyl production runs and this release appeared on 3403 black, 515 grey and 400 purple discs, the latter released to coincide with a European tour, with a different cover.

== Overview ==
On this album, the band exhibited all the characteristics of the New York hardcore community of bands with which they were often associated, although they came from New Jersey and were signed to a Californian record label. Songs are invariably fast-paced with an intermittent slow refrain (called breakdowns). They are also of short duration with only one track lasting more than three minutes. It is basic, straightforward hardcore punk in contrast to the metalcore leanings they exhibited on later releases. Hardcore is generally defined in terms of its vocal style, short songs and lack of guitar solos and, although at times melodic, Ensign had all these traits on this release.

== Track listing ==
- All songs written by Ensign
1. "Page 32" – 2:25
2. "Foundation" – 1:52
3. "Day By Day" – 1:50
4. "Direction Of Things To Come" – 2:00
5. "Blueprint" – 1:59
6. "Furthest From The Middle" – 2:24
7. "Where Did We Go Wrong" – 1:41
8. "Revolutions End" – 1:19
9. "Tomorrow's Shadow" – 2:12
10. "Tourniquet" – 1:46
11. "First, Last, Only" – 2:51
12. "Hold" – 2:19
13. "Image" – 3:05
- Tracks 7 and 10 were reprises of songs which were recorded after the Fall from Grace EP session
- Track 12 is a reprise of the song which was recorded in the same session as the Fall from Grace EP
- These three tracks can be found in their original form on the retrospective release, Three Years Two Months Eleven Days

== Credits ==
- Tim Shaw – vocals
- John Fraunberger – guitar
- Nate "Edge" Gluck – bass
- Ryan Murphy – drums
- Recorded June 1997 at Trax East, South River, New Jersey, USA
- Produced by Steve Evetts and Ensign
- Assistant Producers: Pete Tabbot and Steve Cunningham
- Engineered by Steve Evetts and Eric Rachel
- Mastered by Alan Douches at West West Side Music
