= Todd Hennig =

American punk and hardcore drummer (born 1976)

- Origin: United States
- Genres: Hardcore punk Youth crew Post-hardcore; Indie rock
- Occupation(s): Musician; Drummer; Percussionist
- Instrument: Drums
- Years active: 1995 – Present

Todd Hennig (born March 29, 1976) is an American punk and hardcore drummer. He was a drummer for Death by Stereo and Heckle.

Hennig joined Death by Stereo after previous drummer Tim Bender left, which was mid-late 2001. He has drummed on two Death by Stereo albums Into the Valley of Death (2003) and Death for Life (2005). In 2002, Todd was hit by a motorist, and had to get his appendix removed, but he recovered in time for the band to be able to play on the 2002 Warped Tour.

In August 2006, Hennig left Death by Stereo to pursue other creative endeavors. He played with punk rock group Sex n violence featuring Gene Bullets, Brent Clawson, and Kevin Besignano from Bullets And Octane, and Criterion Records owner Jeremy Miller. He currently plays drums for the punk/rock/hardcore band Nations Afire.

== Discography ==
=== with Seven Years War ===
- Ranks of the Common People (1996)

=== with Heckle ===
- The Complicated Futility of Ignorance CD/12" LP (1997, Hopeless Records)

=== with Death by Stereo ===
- Into the Valley of Death (2003, Epitaph Records)
- Death for Life (2005, Epitaph Records)

=== with Nations Afire ===
- The Uprising (2011, Archic)
- The Ghosts We Will Become (2012, Redfield Records)
