= Death by Stereo =

American hardcore punk band

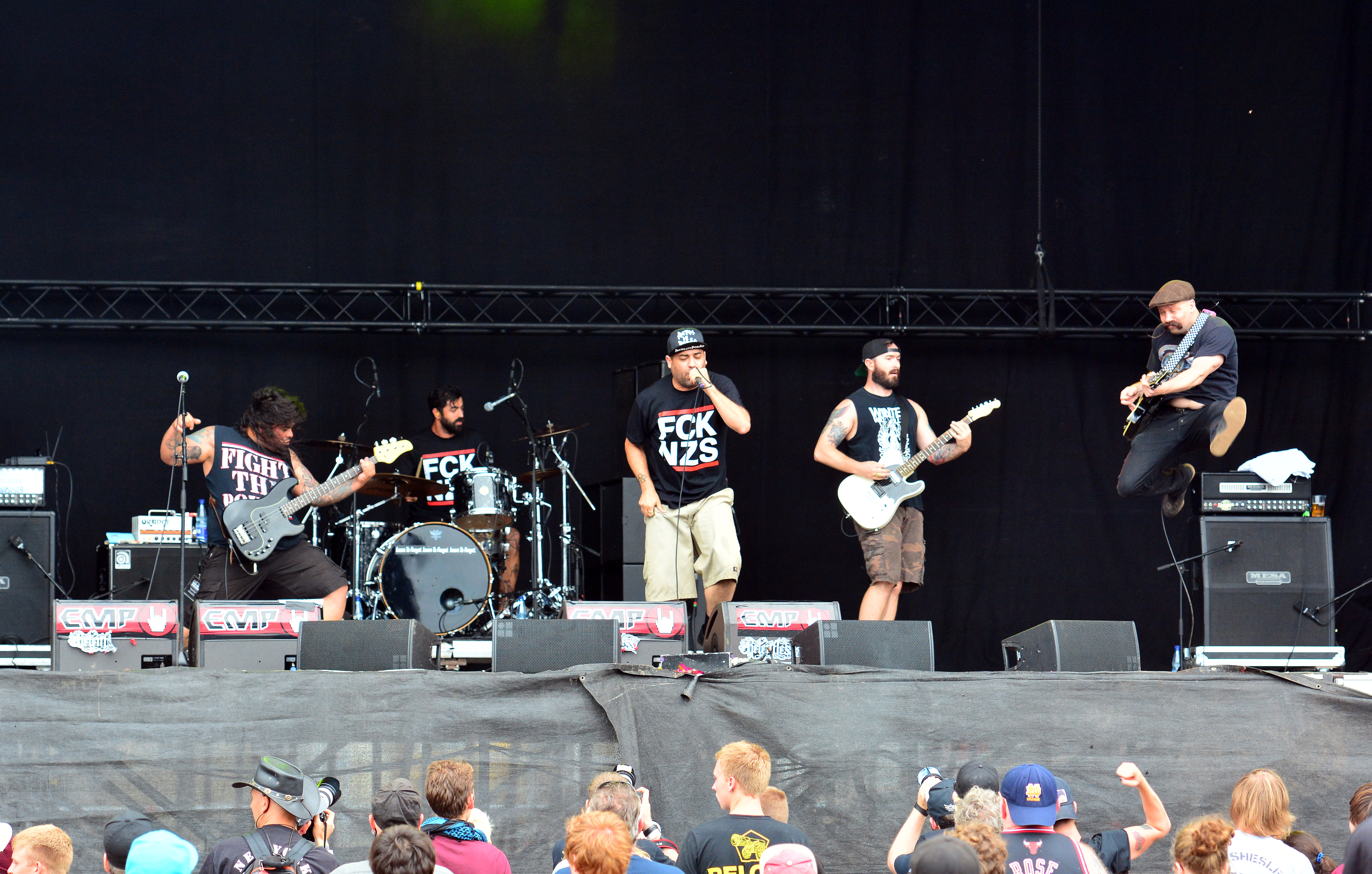
- Death by Stereo at Reload Festival 2015

Background information
- Origin: Orange County, California, U.S.
- Genres: Hardcore punk; punk rock; melodic hardcore; heavy metal
- Years active: 1998–present
- Labels: Indecision; Epitaph; Serjical Strike; Viking Funeral; Irish Voodoo; I Scream; Concrete Jungle; Arrest
- Members: Efrem Schulz; Dan Palmer; JP Gericke; Mike Cambra; Robert Madrigal
- Past members: Ian Fowles; Keith Barney; Tim "Tito" Owens; Tim Bender; Todd Hennig; Tyler Rebbe; Paul Miner; Jim Miner; Chris Dalley; Jeff Clarke; Jarrod Alexander

Death by Stereo (also referred to as D.B.S.) is an American hardcore punk band formed in Orange County, California circa 1998 by frontman Efrem Schulz. Their name can be attributed to the 1987 horror film The Lost Boys, in which Corey Haim speaks the line.

Death by Stereo has released seven full-length studio albums and one live album. Their most recent studio album, We're All Dying Just in Time, was released in 2020.

== History ==
=== Beginnings (1998–1999) ===
The band was formed by Ian Fowles, Jarrod Alexander, Efrem Schulz, Paul Miner and Jim Miner out of what were the remnants of their former bands. Alexander and Fowles were from the band D-Cons, Schulz was from Clint, and brothers Paul and Jim Miner were from CleanX. All five members had known each other long before Death by Stereo formed, as their former bands had toured and recorded together previously. Paul's record label Dental Records had released music by Clint and D-cons and would later go on to put out the first Death by Stereo release.

The five practiced in Jarrod's garage for a few months before recording a demo. They recorded five songs at For The Record Studios, where Paul worked. Out of the five songs, four of them went on to be re-recorded and included on their first album. On March 5, 1998, they played their first show, and soon after began playing more shows around Southern California. By late 1998, the band released their first official release Fooled by Your Smile 7". Following this release, Ian decided to leave the band to go on his 2-year mission, and was replaced by Keith Barney.

In 1998, Death by Stereo was signed to Indecision Records, and released their first album in the following year, entitled If Looks Could Kill, I'd Watch You Die. Shortly after Jarrod moved to Boston to pursue music full-time at the Berklee School Of Music, and was replaced by Tim Bender. Keith also left the band, to pursue his other bands Throwdown and Eighteen Visions. He was replaced by Dan Palmer, formerly of the band Eyelid. They toured for the rest of the year.

=== Early career (1999–2002) ===
In the winter of 1999, during a tour with Straight Faced and Ignite, Brett Gurewitz from Epitaph Records approached the band about releasing an album, ultimately signing them in 2000. Between a tour with Bane and Adamantium, they finished their second album, Day of the Death, which was released in January 2001.

Death by Stereo spent almost all of 2001, touring North America, with bands such as Sick of It All, Boysetsfire, The Hope Conspiracy, AFI, Rise Against, Nicotine and The Planet Smashers. At this time, Tim decided to leave the band and was replaced by Todd Hennig from 'Heckle' and 'Seven Years War'.

In 2002, Death by Stereo performed on the Warped Tour. During the tour, it was rumored that one of Death by Stereo's crew had assaulted someone. Though the band denied the incident, they were removed from the tour for a period of time. Their 2003 album Into the Valley of Death contains a track called "I Wouldn't Piss in Your Ear if Your Brain Was on Fire", which guitarist Dan Palmer said was written about their Warped Tour experience.

=== Increasing popularity (2002–2005) ===
In early 2003, during the recording of their third album, Jim Miner left the band. Tim "Tito" Owens replaced him during a European tour. They released Into the Valley of Death, which was mostly recorded while Jim was still in the band, later that year. It is for this reason, that the album's liner notes, still credit Jim and Dan as the band's guitarists. Tito was credited also, as 'additional guitars'.

On September 28, 2003, during a tour supporting Thursday, Death by Stereo played a solo show in Blacksburg, Virginia, at a venue called Solar Haus. During this show, a fault in the venue set up caused five people to be injured and one person to die. After this, Death by Stereo canceled the rest of their tour dates, and returned home. On October 29, 2003, they played a show to benefit the victims, at the Chain Reaction, in Anaheim, California. This show was recorded and given away for free, with 'Law of Inertia' magazine.

Death by Stereo resumed touring, and began writing their fourth album in late 2004. During early 2005, founding member Paul Miner left to pursue recording, producing and mixing. He has since worked with many big bands, including New Found Glory, Atreyu and Thrice. He was replaced by Tyler Rebbe from Pulley.

They recorded their fourth album in early 2005. Death for Life was released in June 2005.

In July 2005, Death by Stereo's guitarist Tito left the band. They played as a four-piece band up until late 2006. In December 2005, former guitarist Jim Miner returned to the band to play two shows, but he did not return to the band full-time. In addition, Efrem stated that they looked forward to collaborating with Jim, in the future.

=== Playing as a four-piece (2005–2008) ===
During the first half of 2006, Death by Stereo toured extensively despite having only one guitarist (Palmer). In February they played in Santo Domingo, Dominican Republic, for the first time, marking the beginning of their Death to the Third World tour. They also played their first shows in Venezuela, Colombia, Costa Rica and Mexico. They also played in New Zealand for the first time, during June 2006, and supported Strung Out later that month in an Australian tour. The second half of 2006 saw few shows, as they worked on their new album and faced changes to their lineup. They played in Ecuador at Quito Fest in December 2006.

In August 2006, drummer Todd Hennig left the band to play in Sex N Violence featuring Gene Bullets, Brent Clawson, and Kevin Besignano from Bullets and Octane, and the reality TV star/Criterion Records owner Jeremy Miller. Todd was quickly replaced by Chris Dalley. Dalley's first live show with the band was in Colombia at Rock al Parque, performing in front of thousands of fans.

On January 23, 2006, which happened to be the fifth anniversary of their second album Day of the Death, frontman Efrem Schulz posted on his Myspace blog that saying that Death by Stereo will release a DVD that will contain "any footage". Bassist Tyler Rebbe stated on the band's message board that he is uncertain if it will be released any time soon..

In September 2006, it was announced that the band's former drummer Jarrod Alexander and guitarist Jim Miner would rejoin Death by Stereo to participate in the writing and recording of their upcoming album. Since this time, Jim and Jarrod have participated in live shows and have assisted with writing songs. But have not rejoined the band full-time. Death by Stereo's touring lineup, from late 2006 until mid-2008 consisted of Schulz, Rebbe, Dalley and Palmer.

In 2006, it was also announced that Death by Stereo would release a split album with punk rock bank Love Equals Death. The album was to be titled Love Equals Death by Stereo. Love Equals Death subsequently disbanded in 2006, and this project was cancelled.

Rebbe left the band in mid-2008 to concentrate on his other projects. He was replaced by Jeff Clarke. Death by Stereo went into a period of relative inactivity after Rebbe's departure until the release of their fifth album.

=== Reverting as a five-piece band (2008–2014) ===
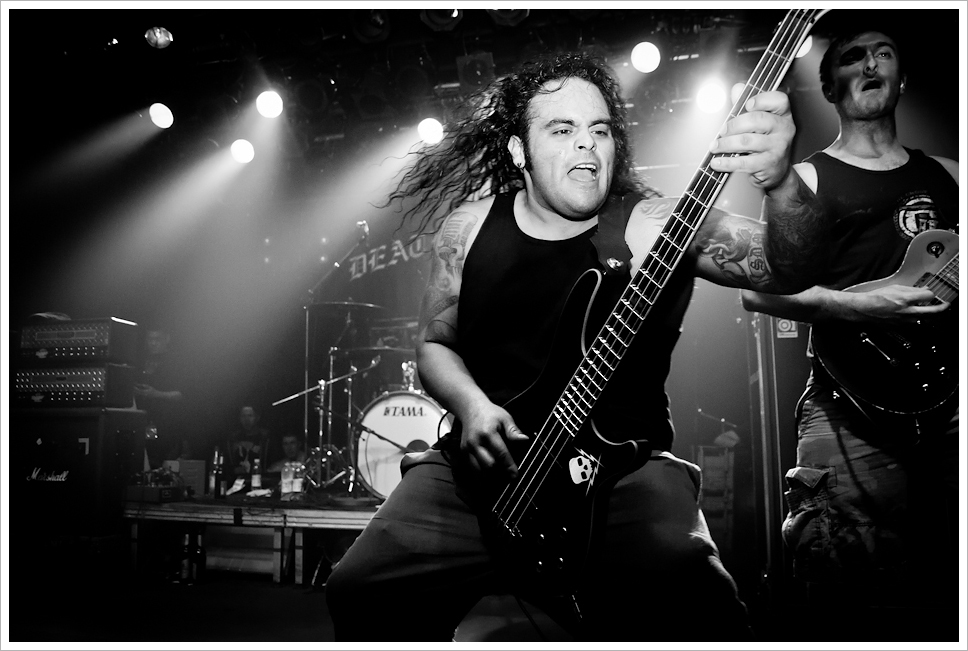
Death by Stereo live at the SO36 in 2012

On October 28, 2008, in an interview with Rebeltheory.com, it was announced their fifth studio would be titled Death Is My Only Friend.

In 2009, Death by Stereo signed with Serjical Strike Records and released their fifth studio album. It was recorded in mid-2008 by Schulz, Clarke, Dalley, Palmer with their new rhythm guitarist JP "The Kid" Gericke. It was produced by Jason Freese. The album was finally released after many months of delay on July 7, 2009. Shortly before its release, Chris Dalley and Death by Stereo parted ways due to internal friction. Chris has since been added as the new drummer for Voodoo Glow Skulls and Death by Stereo has taken on a new drummer Mike Cambra from the Los Angeles-based Cry Havoc.

In November 2009, Death by Stereo toured with Todd Hennig's new band; Nations Afire. The band also performed on the Persistence Tour in Europe in the winter of 2009. The band spent the first half of 2010 touring Europe, Japan and the U.S.

By September 2010, Death by Stereo had begun writing new material for their next album. On October 24, 2011, Death by Stereo released a preview of their upcoming album on their Facebook page. The new song is titled "WTF is Going on Around Here?". The band created a new street team to help promote the upcoming album and touring. The street team was created via Facebook and goes by the name of Death Squad. Currently there are two branches of this street team, US, and UK, with more to come in the future. As posted in the biography section on the band's Facebook page, they were signed to Viking Funeral Records, a label owned and operated by Fletcher Dragge of the band Pennywise. Their sixth studio album, Black Sheep of the American Dream, was released on April 24, 2012, on this label. The band toured relentlessly throughout 2012 and 2013 to support of Black Sheep of the American Dream.

=== Recent events (2015–present) ===
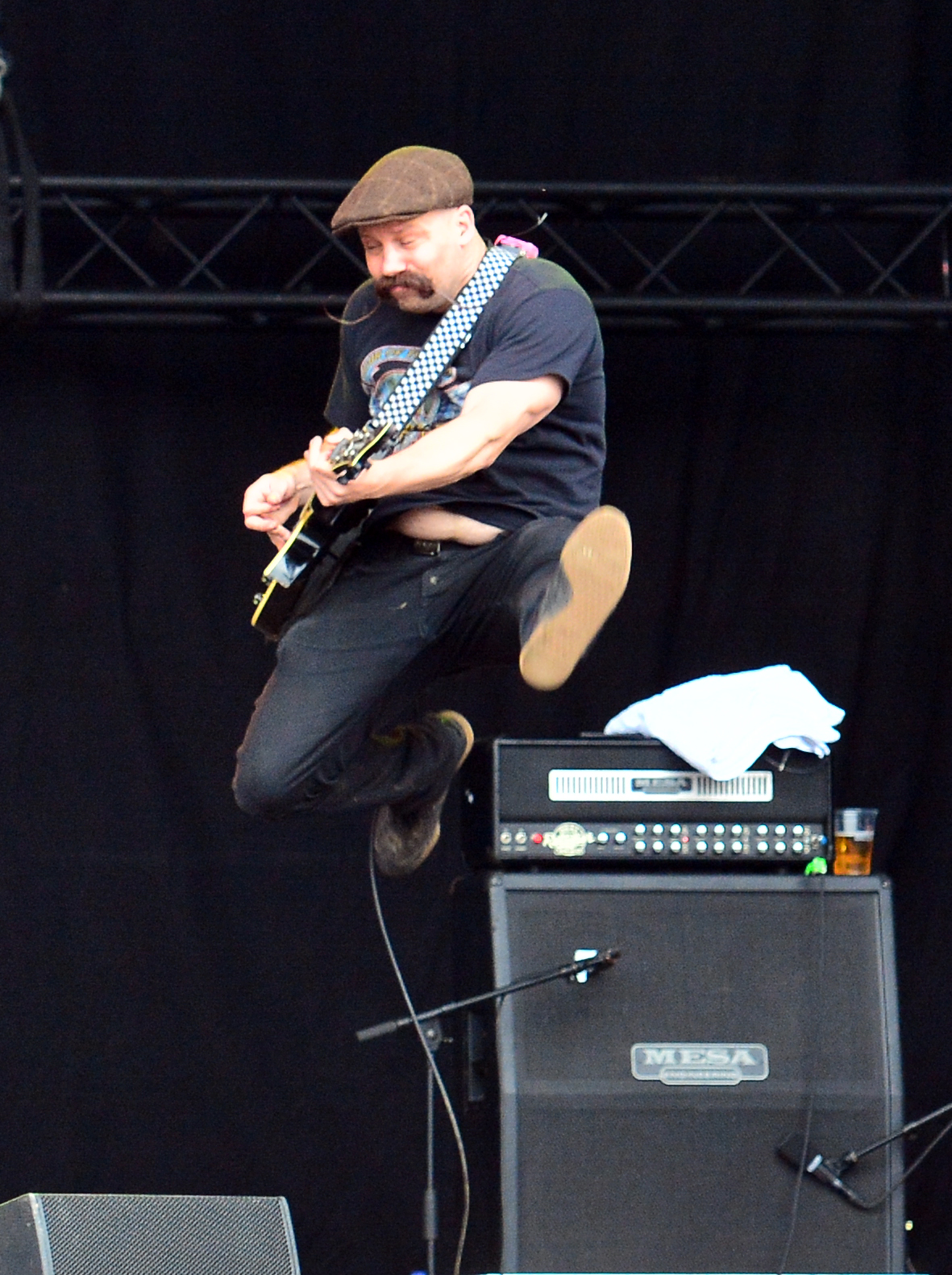
The group live in 2015

In January 2015, Death by Stereo released their first song in two-and-a-half years, "Neverending", through online streaming outlets. It also appeared as the opening track on their six-song EP, Just Like You'd Leave Us, We've Left You for Dead, which was released on October 28, 2016. A world tour in support of the EP followed.

In a January 2020 interview with No Echo, Efrem Schulz revealed that Death by Stereo had been working on the follow-up to 2012's Black Sheep of the American Dream, and that it would be called We're All Dying Just in Time. He described the album's content as "an all out attack on this system we are all currently living in. I think it's got the best elements of everything we've done in the past but still moves forward. It's most definitely really fucking pissed off." We're All Dying Just in Time was released on August 7, 2020, and is their first release on their original label Indecision Records in over 20 years.

The band did not tour much from 2020 to 2022, however then returned to touring in 2023. In 2024 they toured in celebration of their 25th anniversary along with going on an East Coast tour along with Ignite, Slapshot, and School Drugs. In early 2025 the band toured the West Coast alongside A Wilhelm Scream. In November of 2025 they released a remastered version of Black Sheep of the American Dream.

== Musical style ==
Death by Stereo's music blurs the lines between traditional, punk rock, hardcore, and metal. Their music mixes metal riffs, solos, melodies and hooks, and results in a sound that is noted for its originality, among a punk rock scene that some say has become stagnant in recent years. The music has evolved over time, mainly due to the unstable lineup, which has included five guitarists, two bassists, and four drummers. Their first album, If Looks Could Kill, I'd Watch You Die, was punk rock with a heavy influence of hardcore. Their later albums, especially Death for Life, are more heavy metal, with less punk rock and hardcore elements. They are also known for their energetic live performances and intricate guitar work.

Lead singer Efren Schulz singing is influenced by Angelo Moore, Jello Biafra and Mike Patton.

== Band members ==
Current members

- Efrem "The Bean" Schulz – lead vocals, additional guitars, keyboards, programming (1998–present)
- Dan "The Mustache" Palmer – lead guitar, backing vocals (1999–present)
- JP "The Kid" Gericke – rhythm guitar, backing vocals (2009–present)
- Robert "Robbo" Madrigal – bass, backing vocals (2014–present)
- "Turkish" Mike Cambra – drums, percussion, backing vocals (2010–present)

Former members

Guitar

- Jim Miner
- Ian Fowles
- Keith Barney
- Tim "Tito" Owens

Drums

- Jarrod Alexander
- Tim Bender
- Todd Hennig
- Chris Dalley

Bass

- Tyler Reebe
- Jeff Clark
- Paul Miner

== Discography ==
Studio albums

- If Looks Could Kill, I'd Watch You Die (1999)
- Day of the Death (2001)
- Into the Valley of Death (2003)
- Death for Life (2005)
- Death Is My Only Friend (2009)
- Black Sheep of the American Dream (2012)
- We're All Dying Just in Time (2020)

EPs

- Fooled by Your Smile (1998)
- Death by Stereo/Ensign split (2000)
- No Shirt, No Shoes, No Salvation (2000)
- Just Like You'd Leave Us, We've Left You for Dead (2016)

Live albums

- Law of Inertia Live Series Volume 3 (2003)
- Death Alive (2007)

== In popular culture ==
- The song "Let Down and Alone" from their album Into the Valley of Death was featured on the soundtrack to the video game Downhill Domination.
- Christian R&B artist J.R. released an album called Life by Stereo, a reversal of the band's name.
- In the American TV series Drake & Josh, the room of the protagonists features several Death by Stereo stickers over Drake's bed.

== Awards and nominations ==
Orange County Music Awards

Year	Nominee / work	Award	Result
2011	Death by Stero	Best Metal Band	Nominated
2012	Death by Stero	Best Metal Band	Nominated
