= Paul Miner =

American musician (born 1976)

Paul Miner (born December 4, 1976) is an American music producer and engineer as well as a former bassist of the hardcore punk band Death by Stereo.

He joined the band in 1998 and left in early 2005, right before the band's fourth album Death for Life, to produce, engineer, master, and mix music full-time. Prior to this, he produced and engineered the first three Death by Stereo records, which likely explains why the band's fourth album Death for Life, was a noticeable departure from their previous sound.

Miner was also in a band called Kill The Messenger, which was also signed to Indecision Records.

Paul Miner is the brother of Jim Miner, the original guitarist of Death by Stereo, who left the band during the recording of the band's third album Into the Valley of Death (2003).

In 2006, Paul and his brother Jim reunited with Death by Stereo to record the band's fifth studio album, Death Is My Only Friend, which was eventually released in July 2009.

Miner began producing bands outside of his own in the 2000s. Among his credits are recordings by Touché Amoré, This Moment, Avenue of Escape, Suburban Crisis, New Found Glory, H_{2}O, Atreyu, Thrice, The Casualties, Underminded, Acid Rain, and Trueblood.
