= Efrem Schulz =

American punk rock musician (born 1974)

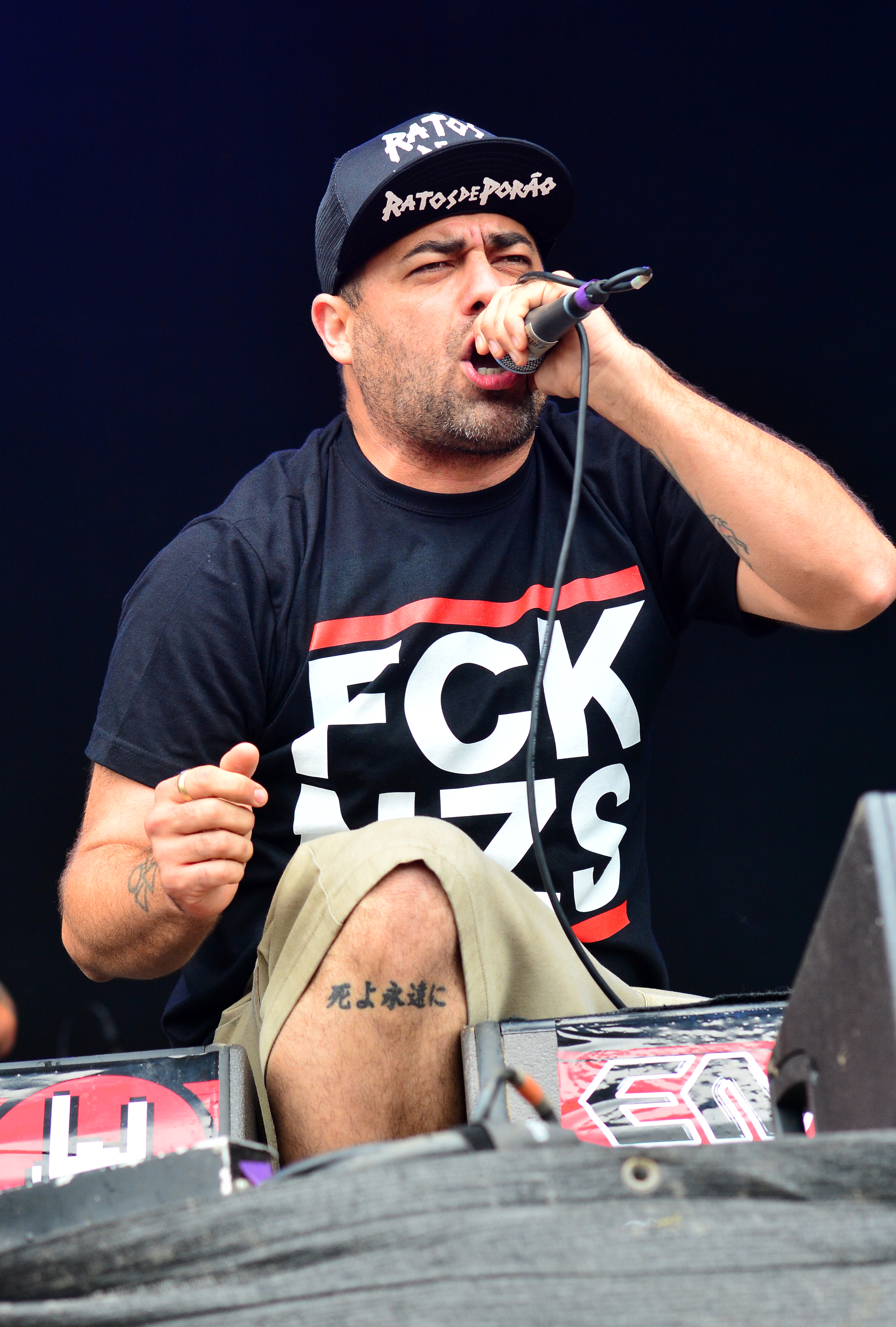
- Schulz performing with Death by Stereo at Reload Festival 2015

Background information
- Born: December 16, 1974 (age 51)
- Origin: United States
- Genres: Punk
- Occupation: Vocalist
- Years active: 1994–present
- Labels: Indecision, Epitaph
- Member of: Death by Stereo, Voodoo Glow Skulls, Mutiny, Manic Hispanic
- Formerly of: Clint

Efrem Schulz (born December 16, 1974) is an American punk rock singer of Mexican descent, best known for his work with Death by Stereo. As of Paul Miner's departure in 2005, Schulz is the only remaining original member of the band. From 2021 to 2024, Schulz took over as lead singer of Voodoo Glow Skulls following the three year departure of "Frank Voodoo" Casillas. Schulz is also the frontman for the Chicano-themed punk parody band Manic Hispanic and skacore supergroup Mutiny.

Schulz was previously in a band called Clint (named so because of a friend named Clint), who released two demos, a 7 inch, and a full-length disc. Prior bands to Clint include Blue Bottle and Hard As Mother Nature. The full-length was released by the owner of Bionic Records, Dennis Smith, and Paul Miner, who later went on to become the bass player for Death by Stereo.

In 2005, Schulz appeared on the song "Botnus" on the album Enter the Chicken by Buckethead & Friends, an album produced by and featuring System of a Down's Serj Tankian. Schulz also performed guest vocals on the Atreyu album Suicide Notes and Butterfly Kisses and on the Aiden album Conviction.

Schulz has held a number of other jobs at punk rock labels and so on, including working at Revelation Records and Kung Fu Records and Films for a while as a production assistant and as a club DJ.

Currently, Schulz is the road manager and merchandise manager for Rusko.
