= Dan Palmer (guitarist) =

English guitarist (born 1978)

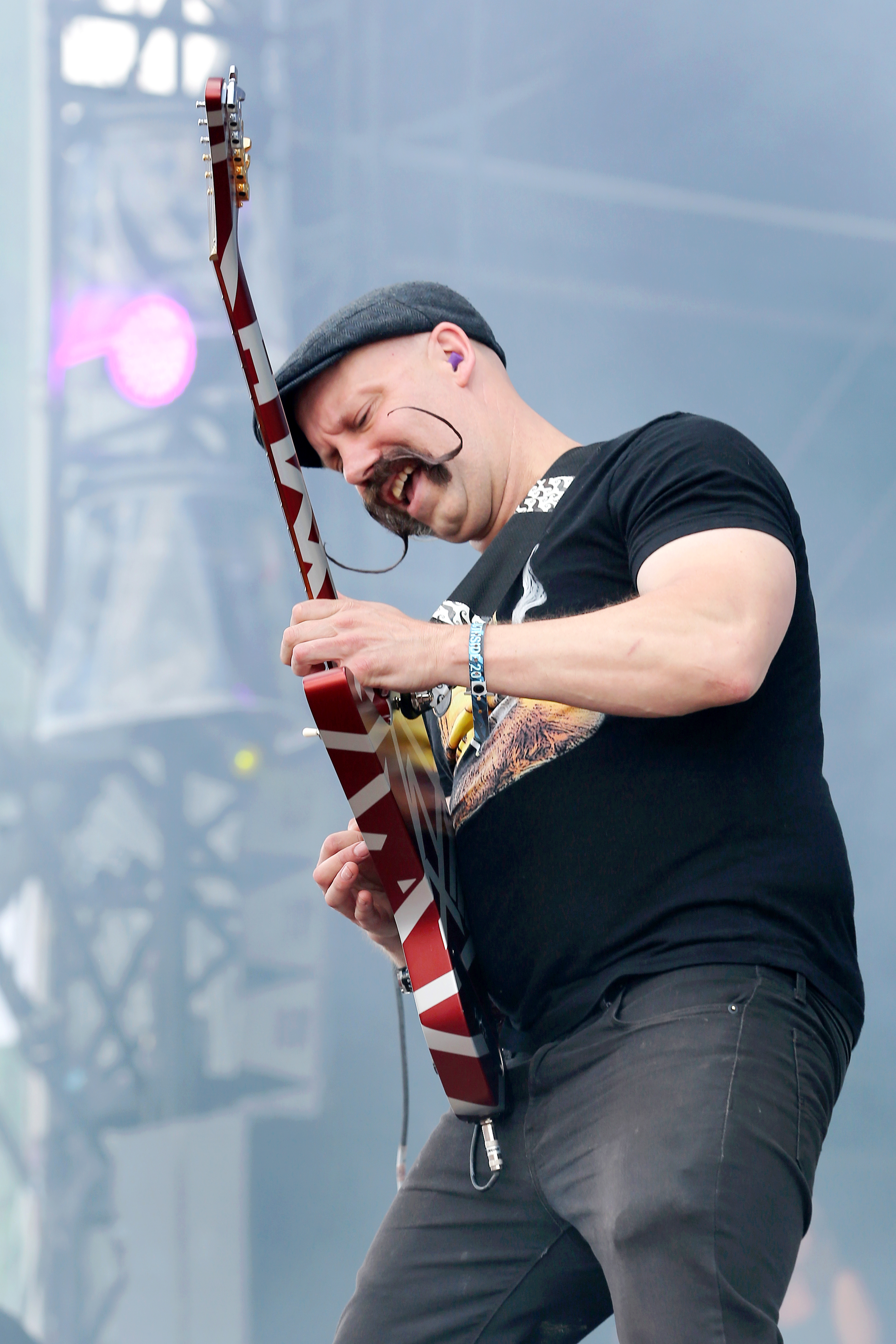
- Palmer performing in 2019

Background information
- Born: Daniel Palmer; 14 August 1978 (age 47); Sheffield, South Yorkshire, England
- Genres: Hardcore punk; punk rock; heavy metal; alternative rock; pop punk; thrash metal; rapcore
- Occupation: Guitarist
- Instrument: Guitar
- Years active: 1996–present
- Labels: MFZB Records, Viking Funeral Records
- Member of: Death by Stereo, Zebrahead
- Formerly of: Eyelid
- Website: Deathbystereo.com; Zebrahead.com

Daniel Palmer (born 14 August 1978) is an English guitarist. He was born in Sheffield, South Yorkshire, England, and now lives in Whittier, California, United States. He is the lead guitarist of the bands Death By Stereo (since Oct 1999) and Zebrahead (since 2013). Palmer is a longtime user of Fernandes Guitars.

== Biography ==
He was formerly the guitarist for a hardcore punk band called Eyelid, which was formed in North Hollywood, Los Angeles, California in 1994. He joined the band in 1996 but they broke up in 1999. In the same year, Keith Barney, who was the guitarist of a hardcore punk band, Death by Stereo, left the band, resulting in Dan taking over Keith's place as the lead guitarist.

In 2013, a punk rock band Zebrahead offered him to join them as the lead guitarist after Greg Bergdorf left the band and he accepted it. He has been using Fernandes guitars for a long time.

He majored classic guitar at university; he has publicly mentioned that he is a big fan of Van Halen, and that those two elements (classic guitar and Van Halen) affected his sound when working at studio for Walk The Plank. The producer of Walk The Plank, Paul Miner, who was formerly a recording engineer of Eyelid and a bassist of Death By Stereo, has been a friend of Dan's for a very long time since then.

== Personal life ==
Palmer's hobbies include grooming his mustache, which he has maintained for over 6 years. He reportedly rises each morning to trim, shampoo and condition it.
