= Timeline of punk rock =

This is a timeline of punk rock, from its beginnings in the 1960s to the present day. Bands or albums listed either side of 1976 are of diverse genres and are retrospectively called by their genre name that was used during the era of their release.

== Proto-punk ==
=== 1960s ===
==== 1960 ====
- Bands formed
  - The Sonics
- Songs
  - "Rollin' Rock" by the Tielman Brothers

==== 1961 ====
- Bands formed
  - Sam the Sham & the Pharaohs

==== 1962 ====
- Bands formed
  - ? and the Mysterians
  - The Standells
- Songs
  - "The Girl Can't Dance"

==== 1963 ====
- Bands formed
  - The Kinks
  - The Iguanas
  - The Rockin' Ramrods
- Songs
  - "Surfin' Bird" by the Trashmen

==== 1964 ====
- Bands formed
  - Amboy Dukes
  - Alice Cooper
  - Los Saicos
  - The Bad Seeds
  - Captain Beefheart and His Magic Band
  - The Fugs
  - The Hangmen
  - The Haunted
  - MC5
  - The Monks
  - The Mothers of Invention
  - The Pleasure Seekers
  - Los Saicos
  - The Shadows of Knight
  - Them
  - The Troggs
  - The Who
  - The Velvet Underground
- Songs
  - "You Really Got Me" by the Kinks
  - "All Day and All of the Night" by the Kinks
  - "The Witch" by the Sonics

==== 1965 ====
- Bands formed
  - Small Faces
  - Stack Waddy
  - Love
  - The Chocolate Watchband
  - The Seeds
  - Flamin' Groovies
  - The 13th Floor Elevators
  - Evil
  - The Night Walkers
- Songs
  - "Demolición" by Los Saicos
  - "My Generation" by the Who
  - "The Train Kept A-Rollin'"
  - "What A Way To Die" by The Pleasure Seekers
  - "Wooly Bully" by Sam the Sham & the Pharaohs
- Albums
  - The Who – My Generation
  - The Sonics – Here Are the Sonics
  - The Fugs – The Fugs First Album
  - The Rolling Stones – December's Children

==== 1966 ====
- Bands formed
  - John's Children
  - The Deviants
  - The Music Machine
  - The Squires
  - The Moving Sidewalks
  - The Zakary Thaks
  - Blue Cheer
- Albums
  - The 13th Floor Elevators – The Psychedelic Sounds of the 13th Floor Elevators
  - Question Mark & the Mysterians – 96 Tears
  - Love – Love
  - The Monks – Black Monk Time
  - The Music Machine – (Turn On) The Music Machine
  - The Fugs – The Fugs Second Album
- Songs
  - "Bad Girl"
  - "Kill For Peace"

==== 1967 ====
- Bands formed
  - T. Rex
  - David Peel & the Lower East Side Band
  - The Stooges
  - The Up
- Albums
  - The Doors – The Doors
  - The Velvet Underground – The Velvet Underground & Nico

=== 1968 ===
- Bands formed
  - Edgar Broughton Band
  - The Dogs
  - Can
  - Black Sabbath
- Albums
  - The Amboy Dukes – Journey to the Center of the Mind
  - Blue Cheer – Vincebus Eruptum
  - The Deviants – Ptooff! and Disposable
  - The Velvet Underground – White Light/White Heat

=== 1969 ===
- Bands formed
  - Hawkwind
  - Crushed Butler
- Albums
  - MC5 – Kick Out the Jams
  - The Stooges – The Stooges
- Events
  - The Stooges and MC5, widely regarded as seminal leading pioneers of proto-punk, released their debut albums.

=== 1970s ===
==== 1970 – heavy metal ====
- Bands formed
  - Blast
  - Pink Fairies
  - Shagrat
  - Third World War
  - Kilburn and the High Roads
  - The Modern Lovers
  - Suicide
  - Figures of Light
  - Ton Steine Scherben
- Albums
  - MC5 – Back in the USA
  - The Stooges – Funhouse
  - Black Sabbath – Paranoid

=== 1971 ===
- Bands formed
  - New York Dolls
  - Death
  - NEU!

=== 1972 ===
- Bands formed
  - Cock Sparrer
  - Electric Eels
  - Neon Boys
  - Swell Maps
  - Sniper
  - The Real Kids
- Albums
  - NEU! – NEU!
  - Slade – Slayed?

=== 1973 ===
- Bands formed
  - The Saints
  - Simply Saucer
  - Television
  - The Punks
  - Zolar X
- Albums
  - New York Dolls – New York Dolls
  - The Stooges – Raw Power

=== 1974 ===
- Bands formed
  - Blondie
  - The Dictators
  - Patti Smith Group
  - Pure Hell
  - Rocket from the Tombs
  - Ramones
  - The Stranglers
  - Tiger Lily (later became Ultravox!)
  - Radio Birdman
  - The 101'ers
- Albums
  - New York Dolls – Too Much Too Soon
- Events
  - Television and the Ramones start performing at CBGB.

=== 1975 ===
- Bands formed
  - The Adicts
  - Big Balls and the Great White Idiot
  - The Boomtown Rats
  - Cherry Vanilla
  - The Heartbreakers
  - London SS
  - Motörhead
  - Negative Trend
  - The Nuns
  - Pere Ubu
  - The Runaways
  - The Screamers
  - Sex Pistols
  - Sham 69
  - The Suicide Commandos
  - Talking Heads
  - Teenage Head
  - The Undertones
  - Slaughter & the Dogs
  - The Weirdos
- Albums
  - Peter Hammill – Nadir's Big Chance
  - The Dictators – Go Girl Crazy!
  - Patti Smith – Horses
- Disbandments
  - Rocket from the Tombs
- Events
  - Television demo tape with Brian Eno is passed by Island Records. Richard Hell leaves.
  - Sex Pistols play first gig opening for Bazooka Joe .
  - Bazooka Joe singer Stuart Goddard changes name to Adam Ant, forms Adam and the Ants.

== Punk rock ==
=== 1976 ===
- Bands formed
  - Abrasive Wheels
  - The Adverts
  - Alternative TV
  - The Art Attacks
  - The Boys
  - Black Flag
  - Buzzcocks
  - Chelsea
  - The Clash
  - The Cramps
  - Crime
  - The Damned
  - Dead Boys
  - DMZ
  - Eater
  - The Fall
  - The Flowers of Romance
  - Gang of Four
  - Generation X
  - The Jam
  - Johnny Moped
  - London
  - The Lurkers
  - Madness
  - Masters of the Backside
  - The Mekons
  - Métal Urbain
  - Paraf
  - Penetration
  - Pork Dukes
  - The Prefects
  - The Rezillos
  - Richard Hell and the Voidoids
  - Siouxsie and the Banshees
  - Skrewdriver
  - The Slickee Boys
  - The Slits
  - Subway Sect
  - Throbbing Gristle
  - U2
  - UK Subs
  - Ultravox!
  - The Vibrators
  - VOM
  - Warsaw (later to become Joy Division)
  - Wire
  - X-Ray Spex
  - The Zeros
- Albums
  - the Ramones – Ramones
  - The Runaways – The Runaways
  - Blondie – Blondie
- Singles
  - the Ramones – "Blitzkrieg Bop" February
  - The Saints – "(I'm) Stranded" September
  - Sex Pistols – "Anarchy in the U.K." October
  - The Damned – "New Rose" October
  - The Slickee Boys – Hot and Cool
- Disbandments
  - The 101ers
- Events
  - the Ramones & Sex Pistols release their first singles, giving birth to true punk rock.
  - the Ramones first non-US appearance supporting Flamin' Groovies. Considered as a galvanizing event for UK punk scene.
  - Sniffin' Glue, Mark Perry's punk fanzine published. Perry soon formed band, Alternative TV.
  - Stiff Records is created in London signing almost exclusively punk and punk-inspired musicians.
  - Sex Pistols, Damned, and the Clash begin Anarchy Tour. Most of the previously booked gigs refuse to let the bands play.
  - Malcolm McLaren organizes the two-day 100 Club Punk Festival in London; performances include: Subway Sect, Siouxsie & the Banshees, Clash, Sex Pistols, Stinky Toys, Vibrators, the Damned, and Buzzcocks.
  - Sex Pistols, members of Bromley Contingent (including Banshees Siouxsie Sioux, Steve Severin) appear live on ITV. Host Bill Grundy hits on Sioux, band unleashes a torrent of curse words.
  - Daily Mirror runs headline "The Filth and the Fury!" A reaction to previous nights live ITV interview with Sex Pistols, Bromley Contingent.
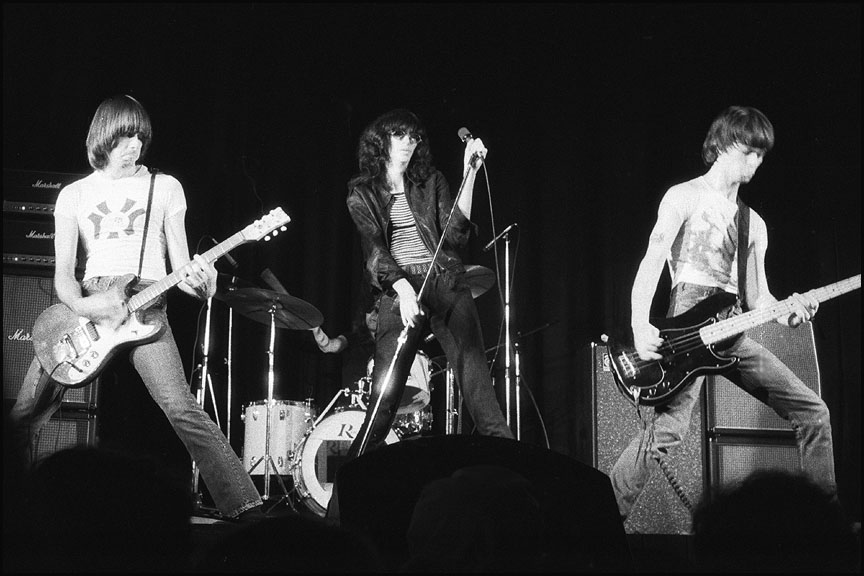
Ramones

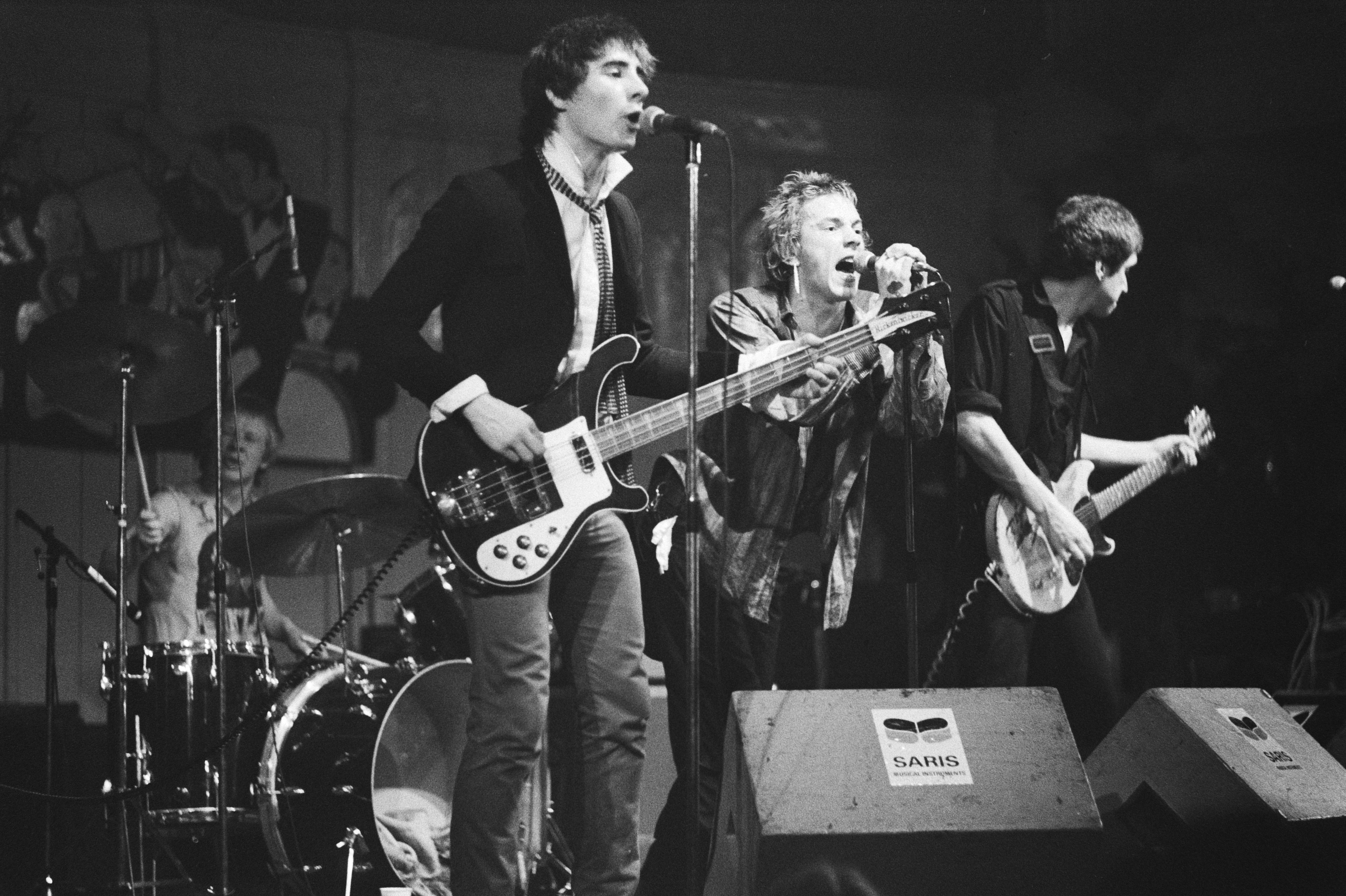
Sex Pistols

=== 1977 - The Year Punk Broke ===
- Bands formed
  - 999
  - Adam and the Ants
  - Angelic Upstarts
  - Bad Brains
  - Bags
  - Big in Japan
  - Black Randy and the Metrosquad
  - The Blockheads
  - Crass
  - The Cravats
  - Desperate Bicycles
  - The Dickies
  - Discharge
  - Elvis Costello and the Attractions
  - Fear
  - Forgotten Rebels
  - Germs
  - Ebba Grön
  - Illegales
  - Nina Hagen Band
  - KSU
  - The Members
  - Middle Class
  - Misfits
  - The Nipple Erectors
  - The Pagans
  - Pankrti
  - Paraf
  - The Police
  - Mr. Unique and the Leisure Suits
  - Radio Stars
  - The Rich Kids
  - The Ruts
  - The Skids
  - The Snivelling Shits
  - SODS
  - Stiff Little Fingers
  - The Valves
  - Wipers
  - X (Australia)
  - X (United States)
- Albums
  - The Boomtown Rats – The Boomtown Rats
  - The Boys – The Boys
  - Buzzcocks – Spiral Scratch (EP)
  - The Clash – The Clash (UK)
  - The Damned – Damned Damned Damned
  - The Damned – Music for Pleasure
  - Dead Boys – Young Loud and Snotty
  - The Dictators – Manifest Destiny
  - Eater – The Album
  - Elvis Costello – My Aim Is True Ian Dury and the Blockheads – New Boots and Panties!!
  - The Heartbreakers – L.A.M.F.
  - Richard Hell and the Voidoids – Blank Generation
  - The Jam – In the City
  - The Jam – This Is the Modern World
  - Motörhead – Motörhead
  - Ramones – Leave Home
  - Ramones – Rocket to Russiaj
  - The Saints – (I'm) Stranded
  - Sex Pistols – Never Mind the Bollocks, Here's the Sex Pistols
  - Skrewdriver – All Skrewed Up
  - The Stranglers – Rattus Norvegicus
  - The Stranglers – No More Heroes
  - The Stranglers – The Stranglers (EP)
  - Stinky Toys – Stinky Toys
  - Suicide – Suicide
  - Talking Heads – Talking Heads: 77
  - Television – Marquee Moon
  - Throbbing Gristle – The Second Annual Report
  - Ultravox! – Ha!-Ha!-Ha!
  - Wire – Pink Flag
- Disbandments
  - The Heartbreakers
  - London
- Events
  - Pioneers of industrial music – Throbbing Gristle and Suicide release their debuts.
  - On 28 October, Sex Pistols' Never Mind the Bollocks, Here's the Sex Pistols is released by Virgin Records. Despite being banned by most of Britain's record shops, reaches number one on British charts.
  - The Sex Pistols' single "God Save the Queen", released on 27 May, reaches number two on the British charts. Banned by BBC Radio 1, the title is left blank in the chart listings.
  - In June, Sex Pistols rent a boat to traverse down the Thames during Queen Elizabeth II's Silver Jubilee anniversary celebration. Police force them to dock, several Pistols fans are arrested and injured in the meleé. Among those arrested are Pistols manager Malcolm McLaren, Vivienne Westwood, artist Jamie Reid, Tracie O'Keefe and Debbie Juvenile (Bromley Contingent).
  - Sex Pistols bassist Glen Matlock is fired from the Sex Pistols and is replaced with Sid Vicious. Matlock forms the Rich Kids.
  - Andy Czezowski opens The Roxy (London) venue in January solely for punk acts. The Clash perform opening night.
  - In February Howard Devoto left Buzzcocks. Guitarist Pete Shelley became the vocalist.
  - The Clash begin their White Riot tour, 1 March in Guilford, supported by the Jam, Buzzcocks, the Slits and Subway Sect. After a dispute the Jam leave the tour in March.
  - The Stranglers embark on a three-month nationwide tour in May. They are supported by the band London.
  - The Boomtown Rats appear on Top of the Pops. The first punk/new wave band to appear.
  - Roxy deejay Don Letts begins filming The Punk Rock Movie, taking London punk scene video footage and editing it into a documentary.
  - In December, Elvis Costello is banned from Saturday Night Live and NBC. The studio pressured Elvis to play his single, "Less Than Zero", he instead performed his anti-media anthem "Radio Radio".

=== 1978 ===
- Bands formed
  - Angry Samoans
  - Charged GBH
  - Cardiac Kidz
  - Dead Kennedys
  - Dangerous Rhythm
  - Descendents
  - D.O.A.
  - Fastbacks
  - Fatal Microbes
  - Fol Jazik
  - The Go-Go's
  - Killing Joke
  - Nervous Gender
  - Pekinška Patka
  - Peter and the Test Tube Babies
  - The Plasmatics
  - Public Image Ltd
  - The Reactionaries
  - The Ruts
  - The Scientists
  - T.S.O.L
  - Social Distortion
  - Splodgenessabounds
  - Vice Squad
- Albums
  - The Avengers – Avengers (EP)
  - The Adverts – Crossing the Red Sea with the Adverts
  - Big in Japan – From Y to Z and Never Again (EP)
  - Blondie – Parallel Lines
  - The Boomtown Rats – A Tonic for the Troops
  - Buzzcocks – Another Music in a Different Kitchen
  - The Clash – Give 'Em Enough Rope
  - The Dickies – The Incredible Shrinking Dickies
  - Crass – The Feeding of the Five Thousand
  - Dead Boys – We Have Come for Your Children
  - Elvis Costello and the Attractions – This Year's Model
  - Forgotten Rebels – Burn the Flag (EP)
  - Generation X – Generation X
  - Germs – Lexicon Devil (EP)
  - GG Allin and the Jabbers – Always Was, Is and Always Shall Be
  - The Jolt – The Jolt
  - London – Animal Games
  - The Lurkers – Fulham Fallout
  - Misfits – Static Age
  - No New York
  - Pere Ubu – The Modern Dance
  - The Police – Outlandos d'Amour
  - Public Image Ltd – Public Image
  - Ramones – Road to Ruin
  - The Rezillos – Can't Stand the Rezillos
  - The Rich Kids – Ghosts of Princes in Towers
  - The Saints – Eternally Yours
  - Sham 69 – Tell Us the Truth
  - Sham 69 – That's Life
  - Siouxsie and the Banshees – The Scream
  - The Suicide Commandos – Make A Record
  - The Stranglers- Black and White
  - Talking Heads – More Songs About Buildings and Food
  - Television – Adventure
  - Throbbing Gristle – D.o.A. The Third And Final Report
  - Various – Live Stiffs Live
  - The Vibrators – Pure Mania
  - Wire – Chairs Missing
  - Wreckless Eric – Wreckless Eric
  - Wreckless Eric – The Wonderful World of Wreckless Eric
  - X-Ray Spex – Germfree Adolescents
- Disbandments
  - Dead Boys
  - Johnny Moped
  - Sex Pistols
  - The Suicide Commandos
  - Ultravox!
  - Television
- Events
  - SST Records is established. Black Flag, Greg Ginn (guitarist/founder) creative outlet to release his band's music.
  - Sex Pistols' disastrous January US tour ends. Johnny Rotten walks off stage at Winterland in San Francisco, famously uttering "Ever get the feeling you've been cheated?"
  - Colin Brunton, The Last Pogo. Filmed in Toronto featuring local and nationals, such as the Scenics, Cardboard Brains, the Secrets, the Mods, the Ugly, the Viletones, and Teenage Head. The show ends in a riot, signaling the original first-wave end.
  - Sid Vicious (Sex Pistols) is charged with murder and the stabbing death of then girlfriend Nancy Spungen, found the morning of 12 October 1978 at New York's Hotel Chelsea.
  - The Boomtown Rats attain the first official UK number one single by a punk/new wave band.
  - Rough Trade Records (music store originally opened in London 1976) becomes a working record label and signs almost exclusively punk inspired bands.
  - Derek Jarman (film director) releases Jubilee, cult punk-themed film, featuring Adam Ant, Toyah Willcox, Siouxsie and the Banshees, and Jordan.
  - Blondie achieve worldwide success with Parallel Lines, mixing styles of 1960s vocal pop, garage and punk rock energy. Debbie Harry becomes an icon for younger generations.

=== 1979 – Mainstream vs. Underground ===
- Bands formed
  - The 4-Skins
  - Agent Orange
  - Big Boys
  - The Business
  - Catholic Discipline
  - Circle Jerks
  - Cockney Rejects
  - Comlot
  - The Exploited
  - Flipper
  - Hüsker Dü
  - MDC
  - The Necros
  - Mission of Burma
  - NoMeansNo
  - The Replacements
  - The Teen Idles
  - Toy Dolls
  - Slime
  - The Varukers
- Albums
  - Adam and the Ants – Dirk Wears White Sox
  - The Adicts – Lunch with the Adicts (EP)
  - The Adverts – Cast of Thousands
  - The B-52's – The B-52's
  - Blondie – Eat to the Beat
  - Buzzcocks – Singles Going Steady
  - Black Flag – Nervous Breakdown (EP)
  - Buzzcocks – A Different Kind of Tension
  - Chelsea – Chelsea
  - The Clash – London Calling
  - Crass – Stations of the Crass
  - The Damned – Machine Gun Etiquette
  - Descendents – Ride the Wild/It's a Hectic World
  - The Dickies – The Incredible Shrinking Dickies
  - The Dickies – Dawn of the Dickies
  - Elvis Costello and the Attractions – Armed Forces
  - The Fall – Live at the Witch Trials
  - Forgotten Rebels – Tomorrow belongs to us (EP)
  - Gang of Four – Entertainment!
  - Germs – (GI)
  - James White and the Blacks – Off White
  - Joy Division – Unknown Pleasures
  - The Knack – Get the Knack
  - Madness – One Step Beyond...
  - The Members – At The Chelsea Nightclub
  - Middle Class – Out of Vogue
  - Nina Hagen Band – Nina Hagen Band
  - Public Image Ltd – Metal Box
  - the Ramones – It's Alive
  - The Ruts – The Crack
  - Sex Pistols – Some Product: Carri on Sex Pistols
  - Siouxsie and the Banshees – Join Hands
  - The Skids – Scared to Dance
  - The Slits – Cut
  - The Specials – The Specials
  - Stiff Little Fingers – Inflammable Material
  - The Stranglers – The raven
  - Swell Maps – A Trip to Marineville
  - Talking Heads – Fear of Music
  - Teenage Head – Teenage Head
  - The Undertones – The Undertones
  - The Vibrators – V2
  - Wire – 154
- Disbandments
  - The Adverts
  - Neo
  - Penetration
  - The Rich Kids
  - X-Ray Spex
  - Patti Smith Group
- Events
  - Pioneers of hardcore punk – Middle Class & Germs release their debuts.
  - British two tone ska bands Madness and the Specials dropped their debut albums.
  - Sid Vicious, Sex Pistols bassist, dies of a heroin overdose at age 21.
  - Nina Hagen creates a media uproar after appearance on Austrian talk-show Club 2 discussing female orgasm and simulating masturbation.
  - John Foxx left Ultravox for solo career early in the year, and replaced by ex-Rich Kids Midge Ure.
  - Ramones star in the movie Rock and Roll High School.

=== 1980s ===
==== 1980 ====
- Bands formed
  - The Adolescents
  - Bad Religion
  - The Fix
  - GISM
  - L-Seven
  - The Meatmen
  - Minutemen
  - Nip Drivers
  - 7 Seconds
  - Terveet Kädet
  - Minor Threat
  - Reagan Youth
  - Rudimentary Peni
  - Subhumans
  - Youth Brigade
- Albums
  - Angry Samoans – Inside My Brain (EP)
  - The Beat – I Just Can't Stop It
  - Black Flag – Jealous Again (EP)
  - Blondie – Autoamerican
  - Circle Jerks – Group Sex
  - The Clash – Sandinista! (triple album)
  - The Cramps – Songs the Lord Taught Us
  - The Damned – The Black Album
  - Dead Kennedys – Fresh Fruit for Rotting Vegetables
  - Discharge – Fight Back (EP)
  - Discharge – Decontrol (EP)
  - D.O.A. – Something Better Change
  - Elvis Costello and the Attractions – Get Happy!!
  - Forgotten Rebels – In love with the system
  - Elvis Costello and the Attractions – Taking Liberties
  - Joy Division – Closer
  - Minutemen – Paranoid Time
  - Misfits – Beware (EP)
  - Nervous Gender – Live at Target
  - Nina Hagen Band – Unbehagen
  - Peter and the Test Tube Babies – Pissed and Proud
  - Plasmatics – New Hope for the Wretched
  - the Ramones – End of the Century
  - Stiff Little Fingers – Nobody's Heroes
  - Talking Heads – Remain in Light
  - The Teen Idles – Minor Disturbance (EP)
  - Toyah – Sheep Farming in Barnet
  - The Undertones – Hypnotised
  - The Weirdos – Action-Design (EP)
  - U2 – Boy
  - X – Los Angeles
- Disbandments
  - Joy Division
  - The Teen Idles
  - Germs
- Events
  - DIY Punk Rock label Dischord Records was founded by key figure in the development of hardcore punk Ian MacKaye.
  - Ian Curtis, Joy Division lead singer, commits suicide 18 May 1980 at age 23. The rest of the band become New Order.
  - Malcolm Owen, the Ruts lead singer, dies of a heroin overdose 14 July 1980 at age 26.
  - Darby Crash, singer of the Germs, commits suicide 7 December 1980 at age 22.
  - KROQ-FM establishes Top 106.7 Countdowns. The Clash and Dead Kennedys both reached on it on same year.
  - Penelope Spheeris (documentary film-maker) captures L.A. punk scene in cult hit The Decline of Western Civilization. Interviews/performances with Alice Bag Band, Black Flag, Catholic Discipline, Circle Jerks, Fear, the Germs, and X.
  - Rude Boy semi-documentary film is released. It stars Ray Gange as a roadie for the Clash and splices in live performances by the band.

==== 1981 – skate punk ====
- Bands formed
  - Black Market Baby
  - Butthole Surfers
  - Dezerter
  - Die Kreuzen
  - Dr. Know
  - The Faith
  - Government Issue
  - JFA
  - Macc Lads
  - The Meatmen
  - Negative Approach
  - Oi Polloi
  - RIOT 111
  - Sonic Youth
  - SNFU
  - Violent Apathy
  - Scream
  - Suicidal Tendencies
- Albums
  - The 101ers – Elgin Avenue Breakdown
  - The Adolescents – The Adolescents
  - Agent Orange – Living in Darkness
  - Alternative Tentacles – Let Them Eat Jellybeans!
  - Bad Religion – Bad Religion (EP)
  - Billy Idol – Don't Stop (EP)
  - Black Flag – Damaged
  - Black Flag – Six Pack (EP)
  - The Cramps – Psychedelic Jungle
  - Crass – Penis Envy (EP)
  - Dead Boys – Night of the Living Dead Boys
  - Dead Kennedys – In God We Trust Inc. (EP)
  - Descendents – Fat (EP)
  - Discharge – Why (EP)
  - D.O.A. – Hardcore '81
  - The Exploited – Punks Not Dead
  - The Exploited – On Stage
  - JFA – Blatant Localism (EP)
  - Métal Urbain – Les hommes morts sont dangereux
  - Minor Threat – In My Eyes (EP)
  - Minutemen – The Punch Line
  - Misfits – 3 Hits from Hell (EP)
  - Plasmatics – Beyond the Valley of 1984
  - Public Image Ltd – The Flowers of Romance
  - New Order – Movement
  - the Ramones – Pleasant Dreams
  - The Replacements – Sorry Ma, Forgot to Take Out the Trash
  - The Scientists – S/T
  - Slime – Slime I
  - Tenpole Tudor – Eddie, Old Bob, Dick and Gary, Let the Four Winds Blow
  - T.S.O.L. – T.S.O.L. (EP)
  - T.S.O.L. – Dance with Me
  - The Undertones – Positive Touch
  - Vice Squad – Resurrection (EP)
  - Vice Squad – No Cause for Concern (EP)
  - X – Wild Gift
- Disbandments
  - Buzzcocks
  - Cardiac Kidz
  - The Screamers
  - Throbbing Gristle
  - The Weirdos
- Events
  - Minor Threat and Black Flag, both considered a key influence on punk subculture and the first hardcore punk bands, drop their debut releases.
  - Epitaph Records is formed, "just a logo and a P. O. box."
  - Henry Rollins joins Black Flag and becomes lead singer.
  - Cuckoo's Nest (nightclub) closes. For the last time.

==== 1982 - Hightide of Hardcore ====
- Bands formed
  - Agnostic Front
  - The Blood
  - Cholera
  - Crimpshrine
  - Crucifucks
  - D.I.
  - Die Ärzte
  - Die Toten Hosen
  - KBO!
  - Tales of Terror
  - The Vandals
  - The Pogues
  - Visací zámek
- Albums
  - Abrasive Wheels – When the Punks Go Marching In
  - Angry Samoans – Back from Samoa
  - Anti-Nowhere League – Anti-Nowhere League
  - Bad Brains – Bad Brains
  - Bad Religion – How Could Hell Be Any Worse?
  - Billy Idol – Billy Idol
  - Black Flag – TV Party (EP)
  - Black Flag – Everything Went Black
  - Circle Jerks – Wild in the Streets
  - The Clash – Combat Rock
  - Crass – Christ the Album
  - The Damned – Strawberries
  - Dead Kennedys – Plastic Surgery Disasters
  - Descendents – Milo Goes to College
  - Discharge – Hear Nothing See Nothing Say Nothing
  - Discharge – Never Again (EP)
  - Dischord Records – Flex Your Head
  - The Exploited – Troops of Tomorrow
  - Faith/Void – Faith/Void Split LP
  - Fear – The Record
  - Flipper – Album – Generic Flipper
  - Forgotten Rebels – This ain't Hollywood, this is rock and roll
  - GBH – City Baby Attacked by Rats
  - Kraut – An Adjustment to Society
  - Hüsker Dü – Land Speed Record
  - MDC – Millions of Dead Cops
  - Misfits – Walk Among Us
  - The Replacements – Stink (EP)
  - Sonic Youth – Sonic Youth (EP)
  - SSD – The Kids Will Have Their Say
  - Subhumans – The Day the Country Died
  - Vandals – Peace thru Vandalism
  - Vice Squad – Stand Strong Stand Proud
  - X – Under the Big Black Sun
  - Youth Brigade – Sound & Fury
- Disbandments
  - Adam and the Ants
  - The Adolescents
  - The Slits
- Events
  - December, Crass, the Mob, the Apostles members and others squat the Zig Zag in W. London. Then launch free all day event featuring anarcho-punk bands.

==== 1983 ====
- Bands formed
  - Badmingtons
  - Dead Milkmen
  - Neon Christ
  - Niet
  - NOFX
  - Samhain
  - Squirrel Bait
  - Rich Kids on LSD
  - Warriors of the last Days
- Albums
  - Bad Brains – Rock for Light
  - Bad Religion – Into the Unknown
  - Billy Idol – Rebel Yell
  - Circle Jerks – Golden Shower of Hits
  - The Cramps – Smell of Female
  - Crass – Yes Sir, I Will
  - D.I. – D.I.
  - The Dickies – Stukas Over Disneyland
  - Die Toten Hosen – Opel-Gang
  - Discharge – Warning: Her Majesty's Government Can Seriously Damage Your Health (EP)
  - The Faith – Subject to Change
  - Flux of Pink Indians – Strive to Survive Causing the Least Suffering Possible
  - Minor Threat – Out of Step
  - Minutemen – What Makes a Man Start Fires?
  - Minutemen – Buzz or Howl Under the Influence of Heat
  - Misfits – Earth A.D./Wolfs Blood
  - the Ramones – Subterranean Jungle
  - The Scientists – Blood Red River
  - Social Distortion – Mommy's Little Monster
  - Sonic Youth – Confusion Is Sex
  - Subhumans – Time Flies... But Aeroplanes Crash
  - Suicidal Tendencies – Suicidal Tendencies
  - Toy Dolls – Dig That Groove Baby
  - Violent Femmes – Violent Femmes
  - X – More Fun in the New World
- Disbandments
  - The Faith
  - Minor Threat
  - Misfits
  - The Undertones
- Events
  - Mick Jones is kicked out of the Clash.

==== 1984 – post hardcore ====
- Bands formed
  - Green River
  - Gwar
  - Hogan's Heroes
  - Siekiera
  - Uniform Choice
  - Vennaskond
  - The Offspring
- Albums
  - Agnostic Front – Victim in Pain
  - Anti-Pasti – Anti-Pasti
  - Black Flag – Family Man
  - Black Flag – My War
  - Black Flag – Slip It In
  - Die Ärzte – Debil
  - Die Kreuzen – Die Kreuzen
  - Flipper – Blow'n Chunks
  - Flipper – Gone Fishin'
  - Flux of Pink Indians – The Fucking Cunts Treat Us Like Pricks
  - Hüsker Dü – Zen Arcade
  - MDC – Chicken Squawk (EP)
  - Minor Threat – Minor Threat
  - Minutemen – Double Nickels on the Dime
  - New Model Army – Vengeance
  - The Pogues – Red Roses for Me
  - the Ramones – Too Tough to Die
  - The Replacements – Let It Be
  - Samhain – Initium
  - 7 Seconds – The Crew
  - Subhumans – From the Cradle to the Grave
  - Tales of Terror – Tales of Terror
  - Talking Heads – Stop Making Sense
  - Various – International P.E.A.C.E. Benefit Compilation
- Disbandments
  - Abrasive Wheels
  - Crass
  - The Members
- Events
  - Another State of Mind rockumentary is released. Detailing 1982 tour of Social Distortion, Youth Brigade and small road crew as they travel across U.S. and Canada.

==== 1985 ====
- Bands formed
  - Dag Nasty
  - Parasites
  - Pestes
  - The Mr. T Experience
  - Youth of Today
  - Armia
- Albums
  - Bad Religion – Back to the Known (EP)
  - Black Flag – Loose Nut
  - Black Flag – In My Head
  - Black Flag – The Process of Weeding Out (EP)
  - Circle Jerks – Wonderful
  - The Clash – Cut the Crap
  - Crucifucks – The Crucifucks
  - The Damned – Phantasmagoria
  - D.I. – Ancient Artifacts
  - D.I. – Horse Bites Dog Cries
  - Die Ärzte – Im Schatten der Ärzte
  - Dead Kennedys – Frankenchrist
  - Dead Milkmen – Big Lizard in My Backyard
  - Descendents – I Don't Want to Grow Up
  - Descendents – Bonus Fat
  - Die Toten Hosen – Unter falscher Flagge
  - Green River – Come On Down (EP)
  - Gwar – Hell-O
  - The Exploited – Horror Epics
  - Fear – More Beer
  - Forgotten Rebels – Boys will be boys (EP)
  - Hüsker Dü – Flip Your Wig
  - Hüsker Dü – New Day Rising
  - The Jesus and Mary Chain – Psychocandy
  - Minor Threat – Salad Days (EP)
  - Minutemen – Project Mersh (EP)
  - Minutemen – 3-Way Tie (For Last)
  - Misfits – Legacy of Brutality
  - R.K.L. – Keep Laughing
  - Samhain – Unholy Passion (EP)
  - The Scientists – Demolition Derby
  - 7 Seconds – Walk Together, Rock Together
  - Sonic Youth – Bad Moon Rising
  - Subhumans – Worlds Apart
  - X – Ain't Love Grand!
- Disbandments
  - Minutemen
  - SS Decontrol
- Events
  - D. Boon of Minutemen dies in a car accident

==== 1986 ====
- Bands formed
  - Firehose
  - Good Riddance
  - Jawbreaker
  - J.M.K.E.
  - No Doubt
  - Pixies
  - Propagandhi
  - Screeching Weasel
  - Sick of It All
  - Snuff
  - Soulside
- Albums
  - Agnostic Front – Cause for Alarm
  - Bad Brains – I Against I
  - Big Black – Atomizer
  - Billy Idol – Whiplash Smile
  - The Cramps – A Date with Elvis
  - Dag Nasty – Can I Say
  - The Damned – Anything
  - Dead Kennedys – Bedtime for Democracy
  - Dead Milkmen – Eat Your Paisley
  - Descendents – Enjoy!
  - Die Ärzte – Die Ärzte
  - Die Kreuzen – October File
  - Die Toten Hosen – Damenwahl
  - Discharge – Grave New World
  - Forgotten Rebels – The pride and the disgrace
  - Gang Green – Another Wasted Night
  - Hüsker Dü – Candy Apple Grey
  - The Lookouts – One Planet One People
  - Misfits – Misfits (aka Collection I)
  - the Ramones – Animal Boy
  - Samhain – Samhain III: November-Coming-Fire
  - Sonic Youth – EVOL
- Disbandments
  - Black Flag
  - The Clash
  - Elvis Costello and the Attractions
  - Tales of Terror
- Events
  - The Adolescents reunite.
  - Lookout! Records is established. Future artists include Operation Ivy, the Donnas, Crimpshrine, Rancid and Green Day.

==== 1987 ====
- Bands formed
  - 2 Minutos
  - All
  - Attaque 77
  - Big Drill Car
  - Fugazi
  - Green Day
  - Gorilla Biscuits
  - La Pestilencia
  - Lunachicks
  - No Use for a Name
  - Operation Ivy
  - Rollins Band
  - Backyard Babies
  - Włochaty
- Albums
  - The Adolescents – Brats in Battalions
  - Agnostic Front – Liberty and Justice For...
  - Black Flag – Annihilate This Week (EP)
  - Circle Jerks – VI
  - Crucifucks – Wisconsin
  - Dag Nasty – Wig Out at Denko's
  - Dead Kennedys – Give Me Convenience or Give Me Death
  - Dead Milkmen – Bucky Fellini
  - Descendents – ALL
  - Descendents – Liveage
  - Die Toten Hosen – Never Mind the Hosen, Here's Die Roten Rosen
  - The Exploited – Live and Loud!!
  - Green River – Dry As a Bone (EP)
  - Hüsker Dü – Warehouse: Songs and Stories
  - Oi Polloi – Unite and Win
  - the Ramones – Halfway to Sanity
  - The Scientists – The Human Jukebox
  - Screeching Weasel – Screeching Weasel
  - Sonic Youth – Sister
  - Soulside – Less Deep Inside Keeps
  - Suicidal Tendencies – Join the Army
  - White Zombie – Soul Crusher
  - X – See How We Are
- Disbandments
  - Dead Kennedys
  - Discharge
  - Green River
  - Hüsker Dü
  - Pankrti
  - Samhain
- Events
  - Bad Religion reunites.
  - New Red Archives Records is established. Future roster includes artists UK Subs, Hogan's Heroes, Kraut, Reagan Youth, Samiam, MDC, No Use for a Name.
  - Social Distortion reunites.
  - Will Shatter of Flipper dies of an overdose.

==== 1988 ====
- Bands formed
  - Anti-Flag
  - Chain of Strength
  - Guttermouth
  - Hladno pivo
  - Inside Out
  - Jawbreaker
  - Jughead's Revenge
  - Leatherface
  - Pennywise
  - Nirvana
  - Samiam
  - Sublime
  - Swingin' Utters
  - Voodoo Glow Skulls
- Albums
  - All – Allroy for Prez
  - Bad Religion – Suffer
  - Big Drill Car – Small Block (EP)
  - D.I. – What Good Is Grief to a God?
  - Dag Nasty – Field Day
  - Dead Milkmen – Beelzebubba
  - Descendents – Two Things at Once
  - Die Ärzte – Das ist nicht die ganze Wahrheit...
  - Die Kreuzen – Century Days
  - Die Toten Hosen – Ein kleines bisschen Horrorschau
  - Flipper – Sex Bomb Baby
  - Forgotten Rebels – Surfing on Heroin
  - Fugazi – Fugazi
  - Gorilla Biscuits – Gorilla Biscuits (EP)
  - Green River – Rehab Doll
  - Hogan's Heroes – Built To Last
  - NOFX – Liberal Animation
  - Screeching Weasel – Boogadaboogadaboogada!
  - 7 Seconds – Ourselves
  - Social Distortion – Prison Bound
  - Sonic Youth – Daydream Nation
  - Soulside – Trigger
  - X – Live at the Whisky a Go-Go
- Disbandments
  - Big Black

==== 1989 ====
- Bands formed
  - Apatia
  - Bouncing Souls
  - Gas Huffer
  - Dance Hall Crashers
  - Satanic Surfers
  - The Groovie Ghoulies
  - The Nation of Ulysses
  - Total Chaos
  - Turbonegro
  - The Humpers
- Albums
  - Agnostic Front – Live at CBGB
  - Bad Brains – Quickness
  - Bad Religion – No Control
  - Big Drill Car – CD Type Thing
  - Black Flag – I Can See You (EP)
  - Chain of Strength – True Till Death (EP)
  - D.I. – Tragedy Again
  - Descendents – Hallraker
  - Forgotten Rebels – Untitled
  - Fugazi – Margin Walker (EP)
  - Gorilla Biscuits – Start Today
  - Green Day – 1,000 Hours (EP)
  - Hogan's Heroes – Built To Last
  - J.M.K.E. – Külmale maale
  - La Pestilencia – La Muerte...Un compromiso de todos
  - Nine Inch Nails – Pretty Hate Machine
  - Nirvana – Bleach
  - NOFX – S&M Airlines
  - The Offspring – The Offspring
  - Operation Ivy – Energy
  - the Ramones – Brain Drain
  - 7 Seconds – Soulforce Revolution
  - Sick of It All – Blood, Sweat and No Tears
  - The Vandals – Peace Thru Vandalism / When in Rome Do as The Vandals
- Disbandments
  - The Adolescents
  - Circle Jerks
  - Crimpshrine
  - Operation Ivy
  - Soulside
- Events
  - Nirvana, Green Day and NOFX start to get a lot of underground attention that would burst open in the 1990s.
  - Guitarist Greg Hetson leaves the Circle Jerks to concentrate on Bad Religion. Circle Jerks become less active.
  - Dee Dee Ramone leaves the Ramones, replaced by C. J. Ramone.

=== 1990s ===
==== 1990 ====
- Bands formed
  - Ash
  - Bikini Kill
  - The Casualties
  - Down By Law
  - Drive Like Jehu
  - Lagwagon
  - Lifetime
  - Converge
  - Poor Old Lu
  - The Rudiments
  - Unwritten Law
- Albums
  - Bad Religion – Against the Grain
  - Billy Idol – Charmed Life
  - The Cramps – Stay Sick!
  - Die Toten Hosen – 125 Jahre auf dem Kreuzzug ins Glück
  - Fuel – Monuments to Excess
  - Fugazi – 13 Songs
  - Fugazi – Repeater
  - Green Day – Slappy (EP)
  - Green Day – 39/Smooth
  - Hogan's Heroes – Hogan's Heroes
  - Inside Out – No Spiritual Surrender ep
  - Jawbreaker – Unfun
  - Jughead's Revenge – Unstuck in Time
  - The Mighty Mighty Bosstones – Devil's Night Out
  - No Use for a Name – Incognito
  - Poison Idea – Feel the Darkness
  - Samhain – Final Descent
  - Social Distortion – Social Distortion
  - Sonic Youth – Goo
  - Snuff – Flibbiddydibbiddydob
- Disbandments
  - Youth of Today

==== 1991 ====
- Bands formed
  - AFI
  - Chixdiggit
  - Electric Frankenstein
  - Face to Face
  - Ghoti Hook
  - Glü Gun
  - Hi-Standard
  - Horace Pinker
  - I Spy
  - J Church
  - Mustard Plug
  - No Fun At All
  - The Muffs
  - Pinhead Gunpowder
  - Rancid
  - Refused
  - Shelter
  - Sicko
  - Unwound
  - Unwritten Law
  - The Suicide Machines
- Albums
  - Bad Religion – 80–85
  - Big Drill Car – Batch
  - Bikini Kill – Revolution Girl Style Now!
  - The Cramps – Look Mom No Head!
  - Descendents – Somery
  - Die Kreuzen – Cement
  - Discharge – Massacre Divine
  - Fugazi – Steady Diet of Nothing
  - Gas Huffer – Janitors of Tomorrow
  - Green Day – 1039/Smoothed Out Slappy Hours
  - Jawbreaker – Bivouac
  - Nirvana – Nevermind
  - No Use for a Name – Don't Miss the Train
  - NOFX – Ribbed
  - NoMeansNo – 0+2=1
  - The Mighty Mighty Bosstones – Where'd You Go?
  - The Mighty Mighty Bosstones – More Noise and Other Disturbances
  - Pennywise – Pennywise
  - Screeching Weasel – My Brain Hurts
  - Toy Dolls – Fat Bob's Feet
- Disbandments
  - Gorilla Biscuits
  - Chain of Strength
  - Inside Out
  - Talking Heads
  - Snuff
- Events
  - Nirvana released their "Smells Like Teen Spirit" music video and changed the face of MTV.
  - Green Day's Al Sobrante leaves and is replaced by Tre Cool.
  - Fat Wreck Chords is established.
  - Zack de la Rocha leaves Inside Out to form Rage Against the Machine.
  - Israel Joseph I joins Bad Brains. Drummer Earl Hudson leaves; Mackie Jayson replaces him.
  - Johnny Thunders, of New York Dolls and the Heartbreakers, dies from methadone and alcohol overdose.
  - Television reunites. Records new album for Capitol Records.
  - Dead Boys frontman Stiv Bators dies. Automobile accident.
  - H.R. leaves Bad Brains to go solo. Briefly replaced by Chuck Mosley, ex-singer of Faith No More.

==== 1992 ====
- Bands formed
  - 59 Times the Pain
  - Against All Authority
  - Atari Teenage Riot
  - Blink-182
  - Bracket
  - Buck-O-Nine
  - d.b.s.
  - Fluf
  - Frenzal Rhomb
  - Harvey Danger
  - Left Front Tire
  - Less Than Jake
  - MxPx
  - The Real McKenzies
  - Plankeye
  - Plow United
  - The Queers
  - Randy
  - Reel Big Fish
  - Straight Faced
  - Stretch Arm Strong
  - Strung Out
  - Treble Charger
  - Weezer
- Albums
  - Agnostic Front – One Voice
  - Bad Religion – Generator
  - Bikini Kill – Bikini Kill (EP)
  - Dag Nasty – Four on the Floor
  - Die Toten Hosen – Learning English, Lesson One
  - Face to Face – Don't Turn Away
  - Fifteen – The Choice of a New Generation
  - Flipper – American Grafishy
  - Gas Huffer – Integrity, Technology & Service
  - Green Day – Kerplunk
  - Hogan's Heroes – 3 Fists and a Mouthful
  - Jughead's Revenge – It's Lonely at the Bottom
  - Lagwagon – Duh!
  - NOFX – The Longest Line (EP)
  - NOFX – Maximum Rocknroll
  - NOFX – White Trash, Two Heebs and a Bean
  - Pennywise – A Word from the Wise/Wildcard
  - the Ramones – Mondo Bizarro
  - Sonic Youth – Dirty
  - Sublime – 40 Oz. To Freedom
  - Television – Television
  - The Offspring – Ignition
- Events
  - Jerry Nolan of New York Dolls dies of stroke while undergoing treatment for meningitis/pneumonia.

==== 1993 ====
- Bands formed
  - 30 Foot Fall
  - 88 Fingers Louie
  - 98 Mute
  - A
  - Automatic 7
  - Diesel Boy
  - Donots
  - Dogwood
  - Flatcat
  - Grade
  - Hangnail
  - Hot Water Music
  - Ignite
  - Jimmy Eat World
  - Link 80
  - Millencolin
  - One Hit Wonder
  - Pezz
  - Reset
  - Ruth Ruth
  - Smut Peddlers
  - Slapstick
  - U.S. Bombs
  - Ten Foot Pole
  - The Hives
  - The Huntingtons
  - The Methadones
  - The Salads
  - The Spits
  - The Unseen
- Albums
  - AFI – Dork (EP)
  - Agnostic Front – Last Warning
  - Bad Brains – Rise
  - Bad Religion – Recipe for Hate
  - Bikini Kill – Pussy Whipped
  - Billy Idol – Cyberpunk
  - Blink-182 – Buddha
  - Buzzcocks – Trade Test Transmissions
  - Dead Milkmen – Metaphysical Graffiti
  - Die Ärzte – Die Bestie in Menschengestalt
  - Die Toten Hosen – Kauf MICH!
  - Discharge – Shootin' Up the World
  - Fugazi – In on the Kill Taker
  - J.M.K.E. – Gringode Kultuur
  - Jawbreaker – 24 Hour Revenge Therapy
  - Lifetime – Background
  - The Mighty Mighty Bosstones – Ska-Core, the Devil, and More
  - No Use for a Name – The Daily Grind
  - Pennywise – Unknown Road
  - Propagandhi – How To Clean Everything
  - The Queers – Love Songs for the Retarded"
  - Rancid – Rancid
  - Screeching Weasel – Wiggle
  - Screeching Weasel – Anthem for a New Tomorrow
  - Toy Dolls – Absurd-Ditties
  - Unwritten Law – Blurr
  - X – Hey Zeus!
- Disbandments
  - The Gits
  - Hogan's Heroes
- Events
  - Bad Brains released their first album without the original line-up.
  - Buzzcocks reform.
  - GG Allin dies of accidental heroin overdose.
  - The Gits' Mia Zapata is found raped and murdered.
  - Reagan Youth's lead singer Dave Insurgent commits suicide.

==== 1994 ====
- Bands formed
  - 1208
  - Adhesive
  - Authority Zero
  - Area-7
  - Name Taken
  - Bodyjar
  - Bowling for Soup
  - Choke
  - Consumed
  - Dillinger Four
  - Goldfinger
  - Gob
  - Home Grown
  - I Against I
  - Inspection 12
  - Limp
  - Ninety Pound Wuss
  - Nerf Herder
  - Painted Thin
  - Pain
  - Pulley
  - Riverdales
  - Sleater-Kinney
  - Slick Shoes
  - The Living End
  - The Undecided
  - Useless ID
  - At the Drive-In
- Albums
  - Avail – Dixie
  - At the Drive-In – Hell Paso
  - Bad Religion – Stranger Than Fiction
  - Big Drill Car – No Worse for the Wear
  - Blink-182 – Cheshire Cat
  - Bracket – 924 Forestville St.
  - The Bouncing Souls – The Good, the Bad & the Argyle
  - Buck-O-Nine – Songs in the Key of Bree
  - Total Chaos – Pledge of Defiance
  - The Cramps – Flamejob
  - Down By Law – Punkrockacademyfightsong
  - D.I. – State of Shock
  - Forgotten Rebels – Criminal Zero
  - Gas Huffer – One Inch Masters
  - Glü Gun – Just Glü It
  - Green Day – Dookie
  - Jughead's Revenge – Elimination
  - Lagwagon – Trashed
  - Less Than Jake – Losers, Kings, and Things We Don't Understand
  - The Mighty Mighty Bosstones – Question the Answers
  - Millencolin – Tiny Tunes
  - NOFX – Punk in Drublic
  - The Offspring – Smash
  - Randy – There's No Way We're Gonna Fit In
  - Rancid – Let's Go
  - Screeching Weasel – How to Make Enemies and Irritate People
  - Sonic Youth – Experimental Jet Set, Trash and No Star
  - Strung Out – Another Day in Paradise
  - Sublime – Robbin' the Hood
  - Ten Foot Pole – Rev
  - Turbonegro – Never Is Forever
  - Unwritten Law – Blue Room
  - Weezer – The Blue Album
- Events
  - As a direct result of the success of Nevermind in 1991, punk rock bands like Green Day, Weezer, the Offspring, Bad Religion, 'NOFX, and Rancid were able to reach more eyes and ears than before thanks to MTV, making 1994 one of the biggest years for commercial punk sales.
  - Bad Religion's Brett Gurewitz leaves during tour, to concentrate on Epitaph Records.
  - Bad Brains reunite with all original members.
  - The Circle Jerks reunite. Mercury Records releases their new album.
  - Glü Gun becomes Glue Gun after releasing their first album.
  - Nitro Records is established by Dexter Holland and Grek K of Offspring.
  - Snuff reform.

==== 1995 – metalcore ====
- Bands formed
  - 22 Jacks
  - Ace Troubleshooter
  - Agent 51
  - American Steel
  - Another Joe
  - Audio Karate
  - Belvedere
  - Big D and the Kids Table
  - Bickley
  - Bigwig
  - Bus Station Loonies
  - Count the Stars
  - Craig's Brother
  - Digger
  - Dynamite Boy
  - Eighteen Visions
  - Fenix*TX
  - Goldblade
  - H_{2}O
  - Junction 18
  - Kill Your Idols
  - Me First and the Gimme Gimmes
  - Mad Caddies
  - Mest
  - No Motiv
  - Ozma
  - Rx Bandits
  - The Ataris
  - The Get Up Kids
  - The O.C. Supertones
  - The Reatards
  - The Restarts
- Albums
  - 88 Fingers Louie – Behind Bars
  - AFI – Answer That and Stay Fashionable
  - ALL – Pummel
  - Atari Teenage Riot – Delete Yourself
  - Bad Brains – God of Love
  - Bad Religion – All Ages
  - Bouncing Souls – Maniacal Laughter
  - Bracket – 4-Wheel Vibe
  - Buck-O-Nine – Barfly
  - Circle Jerks – Oddities, Abnormalities and Curiosities
  - Crucifucks – Our Will Be Done
  - The Damned – Not of This Earth
  - Deftones – Adrenaline
  - Die Ärzte – Planet Punk
  - Die Toten Hosen – Love, Peace & Money
  - Face to Face – Big Choice
  - Frenzal Rhomb – Coughing Up a Storm
  - Fugazi – Red Medicine
  - Glue Gun – The Scene Is Not for Sale
  - Gob – Too Late... No Friends
  - Good Riddance – For God And Country
  - Green Day – Insomniac
  - Hogan's Heroes – 101/3 Fists and a Mouthful
  - Home Grown – That's Business
  - Jawbreaker – Dear You
  - Jughead's Revenge – 13 Kiddie Favorites
  - Lagwagon – Hoss
  - Less Than Jake – Pezcore
  - Lifetime – Hello Bastards
  - Millencolin – Life on a Plate
  - Misfits – Misfits II (aka Collection II)
  - MxPx – On the Cover (EP)
  - NOFX – I Heard They Suck Live!!
  - No Use for a Name – Leche Con Carne
  - Pennywise – About Time
  - the Ramones – ¡Adios Amigos!
  - Rancid – ...And Out Come the Wolves
  - Reel Big Fish – Everything Sucks
  - Sleater-Kinney – Sleater-Kinney
  - SNFU – The One Voted Most Likely To Succeed
  - Social Distortion – Mainliner: Wreckage From the Past
  - Sonic Youth – Washing Machine
  - Toy Dolls – Orcastrated
- Disbandments
  - Bad Brains
  - Big Drill Car
  - D.I.
  - Macc Lads
  - Siouxsie and the Banshees
- Events
  - First-ever Warped Tour.

==== 1996 ====
- Bands formed
  - A Wilhelm Scream
  - Allister
  - Alkaline Trio
  - Assorted Jelly Beans
  - Cooter
  - Bankrupt
  - Catch 22
  - Cigar
  - Darkbuster
  - Death By Stereo
  - Diazepunk
  - Jeffries Fan Club
  - Jersey
  - Fonzie
  - Left Alone
  - Lustra
  - Dropkick Murphys
  - Flashlight Brown
  - Good Charlotte
  - One Man Army
  - Panda
  - Side Walk Slam
  - The Dingees
  - Zebrahead
- Albums
  - AFI – Very Proud of Ya
  - Anti-Flag – Die for the Government
  - Ash – 1977
  - At the Drive-In – Acrobatic Tenement
  - Bad Religion – The Gray Race
  - Bikini Kill – Reject All American
  - Blink-182 – They Came to Conquer... Uranus (EP)
  - Bouncing Souls – Maniacal Laughter
  - Descendents – Everything Sucks
  - Die Ärzte – Le Frisur
  - Dogwood – Good Ol' Daze
  - Face to Face – Face to Face
  - Five Iron Frenzy – Upbeats and Beatdowns
  - Gas Huffer – The Inhuman Ordeal of Special Agent Gas Huffer
  - Goldfinger – Goldfinger
  - H_{2}O – H_{2}O
  - Ignite – Past Our Means (EP)
  - Jughead's Revenge – Image Is Everything
  - Less Than Jake – Losing Streak
  - Millencolin – Life on a Plate
  - MxPx – Life in General
  - MxPx – Move To Bremerton (EP)
  - NOFX – Heavy Petting Zoo
  - Propagandhi – Less Talk, More Rock
  - The Queers – Don't Back Down
  - Reel Big Fish – Turn the Radio Off
  - Sleater-Kinney – Call the Doctor
  - Snuff – Demmamussabebonk
  - Social Distortion – White Light, White Heat, White Trash
  - Sublime – Sublime
  - Unwritten Law – Oz Factor
  - Weezer – Pinkerton
  - Zebrahead – Yellow
- Disbandments
  - Jawbreaker
  - the Ramones
  - Sublime
- Events
  - Sublime singer/guitarist Bradley Nowell dies. Heroin overdose. Sublime breaks up.
  - Pennywise bass player Jason Thirsk commits suicide. Replaced by Randy Bradbury.
  - Descendents reform. Release a new album and tour.
  - The Offspring leave Epitaph Records, sign to Columbia.
  - Sex Pistols reunite. Release new album Filthy Lucre Live.

==== 1997 ====
- Bands formed
  - 28 Days
  - 400 Blows
  - Acidman
  - Against Me!
  - Alien Crime Syndicate
  - All Star United
  - Amazing Transparent Man
  - Analena
  - Army of Freshmen
  - Autoramas
  - Beautiful Skin
  - Bliss 66
  - Born From Pain
  - Burning Airlines
  - By the Tree
  - Capdown
  - Closet Monster
  - Enemy You
  - Everyday Sunday
  - Folly
  - Flogging Molly
  - Johnie All Stars
  - Kid Dynamite
  - Lanemeyer
  - Lucky 7
  - Lucky Boys Confusion
  - The Blood Brothers
  - The Matches
  - The Movielife
  - This Bike Is a Pipe Bomb
  - Motion City Soundtrack
  - Noise Ratchet
  - Plain White T's
  - Reach the Sky
  - Riverboat Gamblers
  - SR-71
  - Showoff
  - Spunge
  - The Bruce Lee Band
  - Thought Riot
  - Thursday
  - Yellowcard
- Albums
  - AFI – Shut Your Mouth and Open Your Eyes
  - blink-182 – Dude Ranch
  - The Bouncing Souls – Bouncing Souls
  - Buck-O-Nine – 28 Teeth
  - The Cramps – Big Beat from Badsville
  - Dogwood – Through Thick and Thin
  - Green Day – Nimrod
  - Goldfinger – Hang-Ups
  - H_{2}O – Thicker Than Water
  - Hot Water Music – Fuel for the Hate Game
  - Hot Water Music – Forever and Counting
  - Lagwagon – Double Plaidinum
  - Less Than Jake – Greased
  - Lifetime – Jersey's Best Dancers
  - The Mighty Mighty Bosstones – Let's Face It
  - Me First and the Gimme Gimmes – Have a Ball
  - Millencolin – For Monkeys
  - Misfits – American Psycho
  - NOFX – So Long and Thanks for All the Shoes
  - The Offspring – Ixnay on the Hombre
  - No Use for a Name – Making Friends
  - Pennywise – Full Circle
  - Reel Big Fish – Keep Your Receipt (EP)
  - Save Ferris – It Means Everything
  - Sleater-Kinney – Dig Me Out
  - Snuff – Potatoes and Melons at Wholesale Prices Straight from the Lockup
  - Toy Dolls – One More Megabyte
- Disbandments
  - Bikini Kill
  - Glue Gun
- Events
  - Bad Brains reunite. Release very early studio recordings on the EP The Omega Sessions.
  - The Mighty Mighty Bosstones, the Offspring, Reel Big Fish and Social Distortion all went, 5th Annual KROQ Weenie Roast.
  - Green Day's Billie Joe Armstrong starts Adeline Records
  - Misfits reunite. Release new album American Psycho. Band leader Glenn Danzig wants nothing to do with the reunion.
  - Captain Sensible rejoins the Damned.

==== 1998 ====
- Bands formed
  - 6 Voltios
  - American Hi-Fi
  - Antimaniax
  - Ballydowse
  - CKY
  - Midtown
  - National Product
  - Glasseater
  - Emanuel
  - The Deadlines
  - The Distillers
  - The Explosion
  - One Dollar Short
  - Punchline
  - Jericho
  - Tsunami Bomb
  - Thrice
  - Fuzigish
  - HeyMike!
  - A New Found Glory
  - Over It
  - Punkles
  - Relient K
  - Saves the Day
  - Something Corporate
  - Sugarcult
  - Student Rick
  - Unsung Zeros
- Albums
  - AFI – A Fire Inside (EP)
  - Agnostic Front – Something's Gotta Give
  - Alkaline Trio – Goddamnit
  - At the Drive-in – In/Casino/Out
  - Bad Religion – No Substance
  - The Bouncing Souls – Tie One On
  - Catch 22 – Keasbey Nights
  - Craig's Brother – Homecoming
  - Die Ärzte – 13
  - Dillinger Four – Midwestern Songs of the Americas
  - Dogwood – Dogwood
  - Dropkick Murphys – Do or Die
  - Dynamite Boy – Hell is Other People
  - Fugazi – End Hits
  - Gas Huffer – Just Beautiful Music
  - Jughead's Revenge – Just Joined
  - Kid Dynamite – Kid Dynamite
  - Lagwagon – Let's Talk About Feelings
  - Less Than Jake – Hello Rockview
  - The Living End – The Living End
  - Mad Caddies – Duck and Cover
  - Millencolin – Same Old Tunes
  - MxPx – Let It Happen
  - MxPx – Slowly Going the Way of the Buffalo
  - The Offspring – Americana
  - Propagandhi – Where Quantity Is Job #1
  - Rancid – Life Won't Wait
  - Reel Big Fish – Why Do They Rock So Hard?
  - Refused – The Shape of Punk To Come
  - Snuff – Tweet Tweet My Lovely
  - Social Distortion – Live at the Roxy
  - Sonic Youth – A Thousand Leaves
  - Turbonegro – Apocalypse Dudes
  - Unwritten Law – Unwritten Law
  - Zebrahead – Waste of Mind
- Disbandments
  - Refused
- Events
  - Former Plasmatics singer Wendy O. Williams commits suicide.

==== 1999 ====
- Bands formed
  - A Loss For Words
  - Children 18:3
  - Di-rect
  - Gogol Bordello
  - Leftöver Crack
  - Much the Same
  - Name Taken
  - New Mexican Disaster Squad
  - Pug Jelly
  - Riddlin' Kids
  - Rise Against
  - Strike Anywhere
  - Simple Plan
  - Sloppy Meateaters
  - Social Code
  - Sum 41
  - Taking Back Sunday
  - The All-American Rejects
  - The Frustrators
  - The F-Ups
  - The Kings of Nuthin'
  - The Lawrence Arms
  - The Starting Line
  - Toys That Kill
  - Transplants
- Albums
  - 7 Seconds – Good to Go
  - AFI – All Hallow's (EP)
  - AFI – Black Sails in the Sunset
  - Agnostic Front – Riot, Riot, Upstart
  - Anti-Flag – A New Kind of Army
  - At the Drive-In – Vaya
  - blink-182 – Enema of the State
  - Blondie – No Exit
  - The Bouncing Souls – Hopeless Romantic
  - Bowling for Soup – Rock on Honorable Ones!!!
  - Catch 22 – Washed Up!
  - Choking Victim – No Gods, No Managers
  - The Clash – From Here to Eternity: Live
  - Consumed – Hit for Six
  - Death By Stereo – If Looks Could Kill I'd Watch You Die
  - Dogwood – More Than Conquerors
  - Down By Law – Fly the Flag
  - Dropkick Murphys – The Gang's All Here
  - Face to Face – Ignorance Is Bliss
  - Good Riddance – Operation Phoenix
  - Guttermouth – Gorgeous
  - H_{2}O – F.T.T.W.
  - Hi-Standard – Making the Road
  - Hot Water Music – No Division
  - The (International) Noise Conspiracy – The First Conspiracy
  - Jughead's Revenge – Pearly Gates
  - Less Than Jake – Pesto
  - Long Beach Dub Allstars – Right Back
  - Me First and the Gimme Gimmes – Are a Drag
  - MxPx – At the Show
  - Mike Ness – Cheating at Solitaire
  - Mike Ness – Under the Influences
  - New Found Glory – Nothing Gold Can Stay
  - Misfits – Famous Monsters
  - NOFX – The Decline
  - No Use for a Name – More Betterness!
  - Pennywise – Straight Ahead
  - Rx Bandits – Halfway Between Here and There
  - Save Ferris – Modified
  - Saves the Day – Through Being Cool
  - Sleater-Kinney – The Hot Rock
  - Joe Strummer – Rock Art and the X-Ray Style
  - Ten Foot Pole – Insider
  - Tiger Army – Tiger Army
  - The Unseen – So This Is Freedom?
  - Gogol Bordello – Voi-La Intruder
- Disbandments
  - Choking Victim
- Events
  - Bad Brains tour under the name Soul Brains due to legal issues with former label, Maverick.
  - Bad Religion reunite, record song "Believe It" for The New America album.
  - The Undertones reunite without Feargal Sharkey. Replaced by Paul McLoone.
  - T.S.O.L., (original) Todd Barnes dies of aneuryism.

=== 2000s ===
==== 2000 ====
- Bands formed
  - 3 Feet Smaller
  - Brand New
  - The Dresden Dolls
  - Easyway
  - Flatfoot 56
  - The Ergs!
  - Lars Frederiksen and the Bastards
  - Neverstore
  - No Trigger
  - Pendleton
  - Roger Miret and the Disasters
  - Son of Sam
  - Static Thought
  - Rufio
  - The Fight
  - The Reunion Show
  - Verona Grove
  - Wakefield
  - Zero Down
  - Zolof the Rock & Roll Destroyer
- Albums
  - The (International) Noise Conspiracy – Survival Sickness
  - AFI – The Art of Drowning
  - Against Me! – Against Me! (EP)
  - Alkaline Trio – Maybe I'll Catch Fire
  - ALL – Problematic
  - At the Drive-In – Relationship of Command
  - Avail – One Wrench
  - Bad Religion – The New America
  - Blink-182 – The Mark, Tom, and Travis Show
  - The Briefs – Hit After Hit
  - Catch 22 – Alone in a Crowd
  - The Distillers – The Distillers
  - Die Ärzte – Runter mit den Spendierhosen, Unsichtbarer!
  - Dogwood – Building a Better Me
  - Dropkick Murphys – The Singles Collection, Volume 1
  - Dynamite Hack – Superfast
  - The Explosion – Flash Flash Flash
  - Face to Face – Reactionary
  - Forgotten Rebels – Nobody's Heros
  - Green Day – Warning
  - Goldfinger – Stomping Ground
  - The Hives – Veni Vidi Vicious
  - Ignite – A Place Called Home
  - Kid Dynamite – Shorter, Faster, Louder
  - The Kings of Nuthin' – Get Busy Livin' or Get Busy Dyin'
  - Lagwagon – Let's Talk About Leftovers
  - Less Than Jake – Borders and Boundaries
  - The Living End – Roll On
  - Mest – Wasting Time
  - Midtown – Save the World, Lose the Girl
  - The Mighty Mighty Bosstones – Pay Attention
  - Millencolin – Pennybridge Pioneers
  - MxPx – The Ever Passing Moment
  - Nerf Herder – How to Meet Girls
  - No Doubt – Return of Saturn
  - NOFX – Bottles to the Ground
  - NOFX – Pump Up the Valuum
  - The Offspring – Conspiracy of One
  - Pennywise – Live @ the Key Club
  - Rancid – Rancid
  - Sleater-Kinney – All Hands on the Bad One
  - Snuff – Numb Nuts
  - Sonic Youth – NYC Ghosts & Flowers
  - Sum 41 – Half Hour of Power
  - Toy Dolls – Anniversary Anthems
  - U.S. Crush – U.S. Crush
- Disbandments
  - Kid Dynamite
  - Nip Drivers
  - Save Ferris
- Events
  - Social Distortion's Dennis Danell dies of brain aneurysm. Replaced by Jonny Wickersham.
  - Archie Comics files lawsuit with Jughead's Revenge.
  - Atari Teenage Riot takes indefinite hiatus.

==== 2001 – modern melodic hardcore ====
- Bands formed
  - Bobot Adrenaline
  - Bombs Over Providence
  - Box Car Racer
  - Fall Out Boy
  - Fucked Up
  - Go Betty Go
  - Greyfield
  - Goodnight Nurse
  - High Five Drive
  - The Briggs
  - The Goodwill
  - Killradio
  - Lost City Angels
  - Math the Band
  - My Chemical Romance
  - Near Miss
  - None More Black
  - Par-T-One
  - Patent Pending
  - Teenage Bottlerocket
  - The Used
  - Sparta
- Albums
  - 311 – From Chaos
  - Agnostic Front – Dead Yuppies
  - Alkaline Trio – From Here To Infirmary
  - ALL/Descendents – Live Plus One
  - Anti-Flag – Their System Doesn't Work For You
  - Anti-Flag – Underground Network
  - Blink-182 – Take Off Your Pants and Jacket
  - Brand New – Your Favorite Weapon
  - Bouncing Souls – How I Spent My Summer Vacation
  - Converge – Jane Doe
  - Craig's Brother – Lost at Sea
  - The Damned – Grave Disorder
  - Death By Stereo – Day of the Death
  - Dogwood – Matt Aragon
  - Dropkick Murphys – Sing Loud Sing Proud
  - Lars Frederiksen and the Bastards – Lars Frederiksen and the Bastards
  - Fugazi – The Argument
  - Good Riddance – Symptoms of a Leveling Spirit
  - Guttermouth – Covered With Ants
  - H_{2}O – Go
  - Hot Water Music – A Flight and a Crash
  - The (International) Noise Conspiracy – A New Morning, Changing Weather
  - Leftöver Crack – Mediocre Generica
  - Me First and the Gimme Gimmes – Blow in the Wind
  - Mest – Destination Unknown
  - Misfits – Cuts from the Crypt
  - Millencolin – The Melancholy Collection
  - Millencolin – No Cigar
  - Par-T-One – I'm So Crazy (EP)
  - Pennywise – Land of the Free?
  - Propagandhi – Today's Empires, Tomorrow's Ashes
  - Reel Big Fish – Viva La Internet
  - Rise Against – The Unraveling
  - Rufio – Perhaps, I Suppose...
  - Rx Bandits – Progress
  - Son of Sam – Songs from the Earth
  - The Strokes – Is This It
  - Thrice – Identity Crisis
  - Sum 41 – All Killer No Filler
  - Strike Anywhere – Change is a Sound
  - Joe Strummer and the Mescaleros – Global a Go-Go
  - Tiger Army – II: Power of Moonlite
  - Tilt – Been Where? Did What?
  - The Unseen – The Anger & The Truth
  - Useless ID – Bad Story, Happy Ending
  - Vendetta Red – White Knuckled Substance
- Disbandments
  - 22 Jacks
  - At the Drive-In
  - Jughead's Revenge
- Events
  - The Adolescents reunite for second time.
  - At the Drive-In disbands. Forms the Mars Volta, Sparta
  - Atari Teenage Riot's rapper Carl Crack dies. Suicide.
  - Bad Religion returns to Epitaph Records. Brett Gurewitz rejoins, Bobby Schayer leaves. Replaced by Brooks Wackerman.
  - Bus Station Loonies world record, 25 separate concerts, 12 hours. Event raises funds for music therapy equipment for special school.
  - the Ramones, Joey Ramone dies from lymphoma.

==== 2002 ====
- Bands formed
  - Amber Pacific
  - Blueprint 76
  - Crime In Stereo
  - Letter Kills
  - Not By Choice
  - Paint It Black
  - Senses Fail
  - The Copyrights
  - The Marked Men
  - The Flatliners
  - The Fold
  - The Swellers
  - Vanilla Sky
- Albums
  - 1208 – Feedback Is Payback
  - Against Me! – Reinventing Axl Rose
  - Anti-Flag – Mobilize
  - Bad Brains – I & I Survived
  - Bad Religion – The Process of Belief
  - Box Car Racer – Box Car Racer
  - Dag Nasty – Minority of One
  - D.I. – Caseyology
  - Dillinger Four – Situationist Comedy
  - Discharge – Discharge
  - The Distillers – Sing Sing Death House
  - The Exit – New Beat
  - Face to Face – How to Ruin Everything
  - Gas Huffer – The Rest of Us
  - Green Day – Shenanigans
  - Guttermouth – Gusto!
  - Home Grown – Kings of Pop
  - Hot Water Music – Caution
  - The Kings of Nuthin' – Fight Songs for Fuck-Ups
  - Less Than Jake – Goodbye Blue & White
  - The Mighty Mighty Bosstones – A Jackknife to a Swan
  - Millencolin – Home from Home
  - MxPx – Ten Years and Running
  - Nerf Herder – American Cheese
  - NOFX – 45 or 46 Songs That Weren't Good Enough to Go on Our Other Records
  - No Use for a Name – Hard Rock Bottom
  - Joey Ramone – Don't Worry About Me
  - Reel Big Fish – Cheer Up!
  - Roger Miret and the Disasters – Roger Miret and the Disasters
  - Senses Fail – From the Depths of Dreams
  - Sleater-Kinney – One Beat
  - Sonic Youth – Murray Street
  - Sum 41 – Does This Look Infected?
  - Taking Back Sunday – Tell All Your Friends
  - Thrice – The Illusion of Safety
  - The Transplants – The Transplants
  - Unwritten Law – Elva
  - The Used – The Used
- Disbandments
  - Fenix*TX
- Events
  - ALL takes hiatus.
  - D.I. reunites.
  - Descendents reunite again.
  - The Clash vocalist/guitarist Joe Strummer dies.
  - the Ramones bassist Dee Dee Ramone dies from heroin toxicity.
  - The Ramones and Talking Heads become first punk bands inducted to Rock and Roll Hall of Fame.

==== 2003 ====
- Bands formed
  - Dead to Me
  - Desa
  - Every Avenue
  - FM Static
  - Hit the Lights
  - Maxeen
  - Melody Fall
  - Halifax
  - Error
  - The Network
  - The Wedding
  - The Unlovables
  - Title Fight
  - Only Crime
  - The Wombats
- Albums
  - AFI – Sing the Sorrow
  - Against Me! – As the Eternal Cowboy
  - Alkaline Trio – Good Mourning
  - Anti-Flag – The Terror State
  - Billy Talent – Billy Talent
  - Blink-182 – Blink-182
  - Blondie – The Curse of Blondie
  - Bouncing Souls – Anchors Aweigh
  - Brand New – Deja Entendu
  - The Briefs – Off the Charts
  - The Bronx – The Bronx
  - Buzzcocks – Buzzcocks
  - Catch 22 – Dinosaur Sounds
  - The Cramps – Fiends of Dope Island
  - Death By Stereo – Into the Valley of the Death
  - Die Ärzte – Geräusch
  - Dogwood – Seismic
  - Dropkick Murphys – Blackout
  - The Distillers – Coral Fang
  - The Exploding Hearts – Guitar Romantic
  - The Explosion – Sick of Modern Art
  - Fall Out Boy – Take This To Your Grave
  - Kid Dynamite – Cheap Shots, Youth Anthems
  - Lagwagon – Blaze
  - Less Than Jake – Anthem
  - The Living End – Modern ARTillery
  - Me First and the Gimme Gimmes – Take a Break
  - Thrice – The Artist in the Ambulance
  - Mest – Mest
  - Misfits – Project 1950
  - Motion City Soundtrack – I Am the Movie
  - The Network – Money Money 2020
  - NOFX – The War on Errorism
  - None More Black – File Under Black
  - The Offspring – Splinter
  - Paint It Black – CVA
  - Pennywise – From the Ashes
  - Rancid – Indestructible
  - Rise Against – Revolutions Per Minute
  - Riverboat Gamblers – Something to Crow About
  - Rufio- MCMLXXXV
  - Snuff – Disposable Income
  - Story of the Year – Page Avenue
  - Strike Anywhere – Exit English
  - Joe Strummer – Streetcore
  - Swingin' Utters – Dead Flowers, Bottles, Bluegrass and Bones
  - The Undertones – Get What You Need
  - The Unseen – Explode
  - The Used – Maybe Memories
- Disbandments
  - Face to Face
  - Box Car Racer
- Events
  - The Clash inducted to The Rock and Roll Hall of Fame.
  - The Exploding Hearts' Adam Cox, Matt Fitzgerald, Jeremy Gage are killed in highway crash.

==== 2004 ====
- Bands formed
  - BEDlight for BlueEYES
  - Better Luck Next Time
  - Daggermouth
  - Escape the Fate
  - Hedley
  - I Am the Avalanche
  - Fight Fair
  - Orange
  - Paramore
  - Permanent Me
  - Pissed Jeans
  - Roper
  - Set Your Goals
  - The King Blues
  - The Falcon
  - The Loved Ones
  - Time Again
  - Towers of London
  - The Ghost of a Thousand
  - Pour Habit
- Albums
  - 1208 – Turn of the Screw
  - AFI – AFI
  - Authority Zero – Andiamó
  - Bad Religion – The Empire Strikes First
  - The Briefs – Sex Objects
  - The Casualties – On the Front Line
  - The Cribs – The Cribs
  - Descendents – Cool To Be You
  - Descendents – 'Merican
  - Dynamite Boy – Dynamite Boy
  - Error – Error (EP)
  - Folly – Insanity Later
  - Green Day – American Idiot
  - Guttermouth – Eat Your Face
  - The Hives – Tyrannosaurus Hives
  - The Exit – Home for an Island
  - Hazen Street – Hazen Street
  - Hot Water Music – The New What Next
  - Jello Biafra with the Melvins – Never Breathe What You Can't See
  - Killradio – Raised on Whipped Cream
  - Lars Frederiksen and the Bastards – Viking
  - Leftöver Crack – Fuck World Trade
  - Less Than Jake – B Is for B-sides
  - Me First and the Gimme Gimmes – Ruin Jonny's Bar Mitzvah
  - My Chemical Romance – Three Cheers for Sweet Revenge
  - Pepper – In With the Old
  - Rise Against – Siren Song of the Counter Culture
  - Senses Fail – Let It Enfold You
  - Social Distortion – Sex, Love and Rock 'n' Roll
  - Sonic Youth – Sonic Nurse
  - Sum 41 – Chuck
  - Toy Dolls – Our Last Album?
  - A Wilhelm Scream – Mute Print
  - The Used – In Love and Death
- Disbandments
  - Lars Frederiksen and the Bastards
  - The Movielife
- Events
  - Richard Hell and the Voidoids' Robert Quine dies 31 May at 61.
  - the Ramones' Johnny Ramone dies 15 September at 55, cancer.
  - The Nils' Alex Soria dies 13 December at 39.
  - Social Distortion's John Maurer leaves band after 20 years; Matt Freeman takes his place.
  - Dead Milkmen's Dave Schulthise takes own life 10 March at 47.
  - X-Ray Spex's Jak Airport dies, cancer, 13 August.

==== 2005 ====
- Bands formed
  - +44
  - CPC Gangbangs
  - Fiasco
  - Gallows
  - Bomb the Music Industry!
  - Broadway Calls
  - Bunkface
  - The God Awfuls
  - Jump Ship Quick
  - Mayday Parade
  - Star Fucking Hipsters
  - The Artist Life
  - The Hoax
  - True Liberty
  - The Tuts
  - Versus the World
  - We the Kings
  - The Wonder Years
- Albums
  - The Adolescents – O.C. Confidential
  - Against Me! – Searching for a Former Clarity
  - All Time Low – The Party Scene
  - The Aquabats – Charge!!
  - Billy Idol – Devil's Playground
  - The Briefs – Steal Yer Heart
  - Comeback Kid – Wake the Dead
  - The Cribs – The New Fellas
  - Dropkick Murphys – The Warrior's Code
  - Fall Out Boy – From Under the Cork Tree
  - Gas Huffer – Lemonade for Vampires
  - Green Day – Bullet in a Bible
  - Goldfinger – Disconnection Notice
  - Jello Biafra with the Melvins – Sieg Howdy
  - Lagwagon – Live in a Dive
  - Lagwagon – Resolve
  - Millencolin – Kingwood
  - Motion City Soundtrack – Commit This to Memory
  - MxPx – Panic
  - Paint it Black – Paradise
  - Pennywise – The Fuse
  - Propagandhi – Potemkin City Limits
  - Roger Miret and the Disasters – 1984
  - Reel Big Fish – We're Not Happy 'til You're Not Happy
  - 7 Seconds – Take It Back, Take It On, Take It Over!
  - Sleater-Kinney – The Woods
  - Smoke or Fire – Above the City
  - Thrice – Vheissu
  - The Transplants – Haunted Cities
  - The Unseen – State of Discontent
  - Unwritten Law – Here's to the Mourning
  - A Wilhelm Scream – Ruiner
- Disbandments
  - Blink-182
  - Dynamite Boy
  - Tsunami Bomb
  - Wizo
  - Million Dead
  - Mclusky
- Events
  - The Slits reunite.
  - The Vandals' Steve "Stevo" Jensen dies.
  - Big Boys' singer Randy "Biscuit" Turner dies.
  - R.K.L.'s Richard Manzullo dies.
  - R.K.L., Lagwagon, Bad Astronaut, and the Ataris' Derrick Plourde dies.

==== 2006 ====
- Bands formed
  - +44
  - Energy
  - Ice Nine Kills
  - Living Fire
  - Run Kid Run
  - Search the City
- Albums
  - A Global Threat – Where the Sun Never Sets
  - AFI – Decemberunderground
  - Anti-Flag – For Blood And Empire
  - Bigwig – Reclamation
  - Billy Idol – Happy Holidays
  - Billy Talent – Billy Talent II
  - Bomb the Music Industry – Goodbye Cool World
  - Bouncing Souls – The Gold Record
  - Bracket – Requiem
  - The Bronx – The Bronx
  - The Casualties – Under Attack
  - Catch 22 – Permanent Revolution
  - The Explosion – Black Tape
  - Fucked Up – Hidden World
  - Gallows – Orchestra of Wolves
  - Have Heart – The Things We Carry
  - Ignite – Our Darkest Days
  - The Kings of Nuthin' – Over the Counter Culture
  - Less Than Jake – In With the Out Crowd
  - The Loved Ones – Keep Your Heart
  - Marianas Trench – Fix Me
  - Me First and the Gimme Gimmes – Love Their Country
  - New Found Glory – Coming Home
  - New Mexican Disaster Squad – Don't Believe
  - NOFX – Wolves in Wolves' Clothing
  - None More Black – This Is Satire
  - No Trigger – Canyoneer
  - Rise Against – The Sufferer & the Witness
  - Reel Big Fish – Our Live Album is Better Than Your Live Album
  - Senses Fail – Still Searching
  - Sick of It All – Death to Tyrants
  - Sonic Youth – Rather Ripped
  - Strike Anywhere – Dead FM
- Disbandments
  - The Distillers
  - Mest
  - None More Black
  - The Suicide Machines
  - Sleater-Kinney
  - The F-Ups
- Events
  - R.K.L., Jason Sears dies. Detox complications.
  - Glue Gun reunites. with only original member Bob Oedy.
  - Gorilla Biscuits reunite. After 15 years.
  - The Used, Branden Steineckert leaves. Replaced by Dan Whitesides.
  - CBGB's closes.
  - Rancid, Brett Reed leaves 3 November. Replaced by Branden Steineckert.

==== 2007 ====
- Bands formed
  - Hang 'em High
  - Foxboro Hot Tubs
- Albums
  - Against Me! – New Wave
  - Alkaline Trio – Remains
  - Anti-Flag – A Benefit for Victims of Violent Crime
  - A Flair for the Dramatic
  - A Wilhelm Scream – Career Suicide
  - All Time Low – So Wrong, It's Right
  - American Steel – Destroy Their Future
  - Tim Armstrong – A Poet's Life
  - Bad Religion – New Maps of Hell
  - Bad Brains – Build a Nation
  - Buck-O-Nine – Sustain
  - The Casualties – Made in NYC
  - The Cribs – Men's Needs, Women's Needs, Whatever
  - Crime in Stereo – Crime in Stereo Is Dead
  - Dead Kennedys – Milking the Sacred Cow
  - D.I. – On the Western Front
  - Die Ärzte – Jazz ist anders
  - Dropkick Murphys – The Meanest of Times
  - Fall Out Boy – Infinity On High
  - Fiasco – God Loves Fiasco
  - Flatfoot 56 – Jungle of the Midwest Sea
  - The Flatliners – The Great Awake
  - Leftöver Crack + Citizen Fish – Deadline
  - Lifetime – Lifetime
  - Jay Reatard – Blood Visions
  - Mad Caddies – Keep It Going
  - Mayday Parade – A Lesson in Romantics
  - Motion City Soundtrack – Even If It Kills Me
  - MxPx – Secret Weapon
  - NOFX – They've Actually Gotten Worse Live
  - Only Crime – Virulence
  - Reel Big Fish – Monkeys for Nothin' and the Chimps for Free
  - The Queers – Munki Brain
  - Smoke or Fire – This Sinking Ship
  - Strung Out – Blackhawks Over Los Angeles
  - Sum 41 – Underclass Hero
  - The Stooges – The Weirdness
  - Thrice – The Alchemy Index Vols. I & II
  - The Unseen – Internal Salvation
  - The Used – Berth
  - The Used – Lies for the Liars
- Disbandments
  - Boysetsfire
  - Cheap Sex
  - The Explosion
  - Good Riddance
  - Groovie Ghoulies
  - Kill Your Idols
  - Much the Same
  - Rufio
  - satanic surfers
  - Vennaskond
- Events
  - Social Distortion, Brent Liles, dies. Hit by a semi truck while motorcycle riding.
  - Blitz, Alan "Nidge" Miller dies. Struck by car.
  - Matchbook Romance announce long-term hiatus.
  - Jason Lancaster quits Mayday Parade for personal reasons, later founds Go Radio.
  - Patti Smith is inducted into the Rock and Roll Hall of Fame.
  - The Offspring, Atom Willard leaves. Replaced by Pete Parada.
  - The Mighty Mighty Bosstones reform.
  - The Ruts, Paul Fox dies. Lung cancer.
  - 22 Jacks reform 13 December.

==== 2008 ====
- Bands formed
  - 180 Out
  - Cerebral Ballzy
  - Defeater
  - Joyce Manor
  - Wavves
- Albums
  - Anti-Flag – The Bright Lights of America
  - The Briggs – Come All You Madmen
  - Bus Station Loonies – Midget Gems
  - The Damned – So, Who's Paranoid?
  - Dillinger Four – Civil War
  - Energy – Invasions of the Mind
  - Fiasco – Native Canadians
  - Flogging Molly – Float
  - Fucked Up – The Chemistry of Common Life
  - Goldfinger – Hello Destiny
  - H_{2}O – Nothing to Prove
  - Have Heart – Songs to Scream at the Sun
  - Less Than Jake – GNV FLA
  - The Loved Ones – Build & Burn
  - Millencolin – Machine 15
  - Nerf Herder – IV
  - New Found Glory – Tip of the Iceberg (EP)
  - No Use for a Name – The Feel Good Record of the Year
  - The Offspring – Rise and Fall, Rage and Grace
  - Paint it Black – New Lexicon
  - Pennywise – Reason to Believe
  - Rancid – B Sides and C Sides
  - Rise Against – Appeal to Reason
  - Senses Fail – Life Is Not a Waiting Room
  - Star Fucking Hipsters – Until We're Dead
  - Street Dogs – State of Grace
- Events
  - Jawbreaker reform 3 January.
  - Face to Face reunite for a tour 29 January.
  - Descendents, Frank Navetta dies. After a short illness.
  - X-Ray Spex reform for a one-off gig at Legendary Roundhouse.
  - Dead Kennedys reform and tour US with new singer.
  - The Sonics reform. Perform shows at The Garage, Islington, London.
  - Teenage Head, Frankie Venom dies. Cancer.
  - Producer/engineer Jerry Finn dies from brain hemorrhage. Known for blink-182, AFI, Rancid, Alkaline Trio, the Offspring and Morrissey.

==== 2009 ====
- Bands formed
  - A Common Goal
  - Jello Biafra and the Guantanamo School of Medicine
  - Off!
  - Razors in the Night
  - Sublime with Rome
  - We Are the In Crowd
  - FIDLAR
- Albums
  - AFI – Crash Love
  - Anti-Flag – The People or the Gun
  - All Time Low – Nothing Personal
  - Cardiac Kidz – Get Out!
  - Billy Talent – Billy Talent III
  - Dead To Me – African Elephants
  - Death by Stereo – Death Is My Only Friend
  - Gallows – Grey Britain
  - Green Day – 21st Century Breakdown
  - Jay Reatard – Watch Me Fall
  - Jello Biafra and the Guantanamo School of Medicine – The Audacity of Hype
  - Marianas Trench – Masterpiece Theatre
  - Mayday Parade – Anywhere but Here
  - Marked Men – Ghosts
  - The Mighty Mighty Bosstones – Pin Points and Gin Joints
  - New Found Glory – Not Without a Fight
  - NOFX – Coaster
  - Propagandhi – Supporting Caste
  - Rancid – Let the Dominoes Fall
  - Reel Big Fish – Fame, Fortune, and Fornication
  - Sonic Youth – The Eternal
  - Star Fucking Hipsters – Never Rest in Peace
  - Twisted Wheel – Twisted Wheel
  - The Used – Artwork
- Events
  - Blink-182 reform.
  - Sublime reform as Sublime with Rome. Rome, replaces late Bradley Nowell.
  - Social Distortion, Charlie Quintana leaves. Replaced by Adam "Atom" Willard.
  - Pennywise, Jim Lindberg leaves.

=== 2010s ===
==== 2010 ====
- Bands formed
  - The Black Pacific
  - False Idle
  - No Lost Cause
  - Parquet Courts
  - Turnstile
  - The Way
- Albums
  - Against Me! – White Crosses
  - Alkaline Trio – This Addiction
  - Bad Religion – 30 Years Live
  - Bad Religion – The Dissent of Man
  - The Black Pacific – The Black Pacific
  - The Bouncing Souls – Ghosts on the Boardwalk
  - The Gaslight Anthem – American Slang
  - Green Day – Last Night on Earth: Live in Tokyo
  - The Kings of Nuthin' – Old Habits Die Hard
  - Motion City Soundtrack – My Dinosaur Life
  - NOFX – The Longest EP
  - The Offspring – Happy Hour!
  - Senses Fail – The Fire
  - Pierce the Veil – Selfish Machines
  - Sick of It All – Based on a True Story
  - Wavves – King of the Beach
- Events
  - Descendents reform.
  - Transplants reform.
  - Jughead's Revenge reform for 20th anniversary tour.
  - The Slits, Ari Up dies of cancer.
  - The Used cancel tour, work on Artwork.
  - Atari Teenage Riot reunite.
  - Fall Out Boy disband.
  - Jay Reatard dies of cocaine overdose.

==== 2011 ====
- Bands formed
  - American Standards
  - Christ's Sake
  - The Featherz
  - The Lonely Revolts
  - Pussy Riot
  - The Old-Timers
- Albums
  - The Adolescents – The Fastest Kid Alive
  - Blink-182 – Neighborhoods
  - Blondie – Panic of Girls
  - Cerebral Ballzy – Cerebral Ballzy
  - Craig's Brother – The Insidious Lie
  - Dropkick Murphys – Going Out in Style
  - Face to Face – Laugh Now, Laugh Later
  - The Fall – Ersatz G.B.
  - Fucked Up – David Comes to Life
  - Gang of Four – Content
  - Green Day – Awesome As Fuck
  - Half Man Half Biscuit – 90 Bisodol (Crimond)
  - Iceage – New Brigade
  - Jane's Addiction – The Great Escape Artist
  - Jello Biafra and the Guantanamo School of Medicine – Enhanced Methods of Questioning
  - Magazine – No Thyself
  - Mayday Parade – Mayday Parade
  - Michael Monroe – Sensory Overdrive
  - Misfits – The Devil's Rain
  - New Found Glory – Radiosurgery
  - New York Dolls – Dancing Backward in High Heels
  - Ramshackle Glory – Live the Dream
  - Rise Against – Endgame
  - Screeching Weasel – First World Manifesto
  - Social Distortion – Hard Times and Nursery Rhymes
  - Star Fucking Hipsters – From the Dumpster to the Grave
  - Sum 41 – Screaming Bloody Murder
  - Title Fight – Shed
  - Wire – Red Barked Tree
- Disbandments
  - Sonic Youth
- Events
  - Punk rock band Title Fight release their debut album.
  - X-Ray Spex, Poly Styrene dies of cancer.
  - The Used leave Reprise Records/Warner. Form Anger Music Group with Hopeless.

==== 2012 ====
- Bands formed
  - Ambassadors of Shalom
  - Fear God
  - Metanoia
  - Neck deep
  - Platoon 1107
  - Rogue Anthem
  - With Confidence
- Albums
  - All Time Low – Don't Panic
  - Anti-Flag – The General Strike
  - Bad Brains – Into the Future
  - Blink-182 – Dogs Eating Dogs (EP)
  - The Bouncing Souls – Comet
  - Die Ärzte – Auch
  - Green Day – ¡Uno!
  - Green Day – ¡Dos!
  - Green Day – ¡Tré!
  - MxPx – Plans Within Plans
  - NOFX – Self Entitled
  - Parquet Courts – Light Up Gold
  - Pennywise – All or Nothing
  - Pierce the Veil – Collide with the Sky
  - Propagandhi – Failed States
  - The Offspring – Days Go By
  - Title Fight – Floral Green
  - Toy Dolls – The Album After the Last One
  - The Used – Vulnerable
- Events
  - Quicksand reforms.
  - No Use for a Name, Tony Sly dies.
  - Pennywise, Jim Lindberg rejoins.
  - The Used cancel Canadian tour due to Bert McCracken's misdemeanor charges.

==== 2013 ====
- Bands formed
  - Hippos of Doom
  - Pup
- Albums
  - AFI – Burials
  - Alkaline Trio – My Shame Is True
  - Authority Zero – The Tipping Point
  - Bad Religion – True North
  - Bodyjar – Role Model
  - Broadway Calls – Comfort/Distraction
  - Dropkick Murphys – Signed and Sealed in Blood
  - FIDLAR – Fidlar
  - Mayday Parade – Monsters in the Closet
  - Neck deep – Rain in July
  - Senses Fail – Renacer
- Disbandments
  - The Kings of Nuthin'
- Events
  - Black Flag reformed by original guitarist Greg Ginn. Releases new album What The...
  - The Kings of Nuthin's lead singer Torr Skoog commits suicide.
  - My Chemical Romance disband.

==== 2014 ====
- Bands formed
  - Glitoris
  - PEARS
- Albums
  - Against Me! – Transgender Dysphoria Blues
  - Billy Idol – Kings & Queens of the Underground
  - Blondie – Blondie 4(0) Ever
  - Four Year Strong – Go Down in History (EP)
  - Fucked Up – Glass Boys
  - Joyce Manor – Never Hungover Again
  - Lagwagon – Hang
  - The Menzingers – Rented World
  - Neck Deep – Wishfull Thinking
  - New Found Glory – Resurrection
  - Off! – Wasted Years
  - Pennywise – Yesterdays
  - Rancid – Honor Is All We Know
  - Rise Against – The Black Market
- Events
  - the Ramones, Tommy Ramone dies at age 62 on 11 July.

==== 2015 ====
- Bands formed
  - Frank Carter and the Rattlesnakes
- Albums
  - All Time Low – Future Hearts
  - Anti-Flag – American Spring
  - Fall Out Boy – American Beauty/American Psycho
  - FIDLAR – Too
  - Mayday Parade – Black Lines
  - neck deep – Life's Not Out To Get You
  - Sleater-Kinney – No Cities to Love
  - The Story So Far – The Story So Far
- Events
  - Blink-182 band members headline articles due to very publicized statements targeting guitarist Tom Delonge's lack of commitment. He quit the band through his manager afterwards. Later that year, Alkaline Trio frontman Matt Skiba is recruited to replace Delonge in the tour dates, and officially became a permanent member.

==== 2016 ====
- Bands formed
  - The Chats
  - Amyl and the Sniffers
- Albums
  - Blink-182 – California
  - The Bouncing Souls – Simplicity
  - Descendents – Hypercaffium Spazzinate
  - Face to Face – Protection
  - Green Day – Revolution Radio
  - Ignite – A War Against You
  - NOFX – First Ditch Effort
  - PEARS – Green Star
  - Sum 41 – 13 Voices
  - Useless ID – State Is Burning
- Disbandments
  - NoMeansNo

==== 2017 ====
- Albums
  - AFI – AFI
  - Anti-Flag – American Fall
  - The Chats – Get This in Ya!! (EP)
  - Idles – Brutalism
  - Neck Deep – The Peace and the Panic
  - Propagandhi – Victory Lap
  - Rancid – Trouble Maker
  - Rise Against – Wolves

==== 2018 ====
- Albums
  - Adolescents – Cropduster
  - IDLES – Joy as an Act of Resistance
  - No Fun at All – GRIT
  - Parquet Courts – Wide Awake!
  - Pennywise – Never Gonna Die

==== 2019 ====
- Albums
  - Bad Religion – Age of Unreason
  - Black Midi – Schlagenheim
  - Lagwagon – Railer
  - Sum 41 – Order in Decline
- Events
  - My Chemical Romance reunites.

==== 2020 ====
- Albums
  - Anti-Flag – 20/20 Vision
  - The Chats – High Risk Behaviour
  - Idles – Ultra Mono
  - Neck Deep – All Distortions Are Intentional
  - PEARS – PEARS

==== 2021 ====
- Albums
  - Black Country, New Road – For the First Time
  - Black Midi – Cavalcade
  - Turnstile – Glow On
  - Descendents – 9th & Walnut
- Events
  - Turnstile released their 3rd album to widespread universal acclaim and received many Album of the year accolades.

== See also ==
- Flipside (fanzine)
