= Povilonis =

- Lithuanian surname
- m.: Povilonis
- f.: (unmarried): Povilonytė
- f.: (married): Povilonienė

Povilonis is a Lithuanian surname. Notable people with the surname include:

- Nick Povilonis, American musician, member of Christian punk and ska band No Lost Cause
- Liudvikas Povilonis (1910–1990), Lithuanian priest, archbishop
