= False Idle =

American Christian hardcore band

- Origin: Boise, Idaho
- Genres: Christian hardcore, pop punk, punk rock
- Years active: 2010–present
- Labels: Thumper Punk
- Members: Sef Idle; Tyler Lewis; Seth Warren; Phil Harris
- Website: falseidlepunk.com

False Idle is an American Christian hardcore band from Boise, Idaho. The band started making music in 2010, and their members are lead vocalist and guitarist, Sef Idle, lead guitarist and background vocalist, Tyler Lewis, bassist and background vocalist, Seth Warren, and drummer and background vocalist, Phil Harris. The band has released four extended plays, Hymns of Punk Rock Praise, in 2010, I Refuse, in 2011, California or Bust, in 2013, and a split EP with the band, A Common Goal, Split Decision, in 2014, all with Thumper Punk Records. Their first full-length studio album, Threat, was released in 2013 by Thumper Punk Records.

== Background ==
False Idle is a Christian hardcore band from Boise, Idaho. Their members are lead vocalist and guitarist, Sef Idle, lead guitarist and background vocalist, Tyler Lewis, bassist and background vocalist, Seth Warren, and drummer and background vocalist, Phil Harris.

== Music history ==
The band commenced as a musical entity in 2010 with their release, Hymns Of Punk Rock Praise, an extended play, that was released by Thumper Punk Records on September 14, 2010. Their second extended play, I Refuse, was initially released by Thumper Punk Records, through Indie Vision Music, as a free download in June 2011. Shortly thereafter, False Idle was approached by Veritas Vinyl who then released the EP as a 7" record. They released, a studio album, Threat, on May 14, 2013, with Thumper Punk Records. Their third extended play, California or Bust, released on October 2, 2013, by Thumper Punk Records. Their fourth extended play, Split Decision, released on December 16, 2014, by Thumper Punk Records.

== Members ==
Current members

- Sef Idle - lead vocals, guitar
- Seth Warren - bass, background vocals
- Phil Harris - drums, background vocals

Past members

- Tyler Lewis - guitar, background vocals (2011-2015) (I Refuse, Threat, California or Bust, Split Decision)
- Matt Lagusis - Drums (2010-2012) (Hymns Of Punk Rock Praise, I Refuse)

== Discography ==
Studio albums

- Threat (May 14, 2013, Thumper Punk)

EPs

- Hymns of Punk Rock Praise (September 14, 2010, Thumper Punk Records)
- I Refuse (June 2011, Thumper Punk Records)
- California or Bust (October 2, 2013, Thumper Punk Records)
- "Split Decision" Split EP with A Common Goal (Dec 16, 2014, Thumper Punk Records)
