= Choke (band) =

Canadian punk rock band

- Origin: Edmonton, Alberta, Canada
- Genres: Punk rock Melodic hardcore Post-hardcore; Skate punk
- Years active: 1994–2007, 2013, 2022–present
- Label: Smallman Records People of Punk Rock Records
- Members: Clay Shea; Shawn Moncrieff; Graham ChurchillI; Greg Wright
- Past members: Stefan Levasseur; Jack Jaggard

Choke is a Canadian punk rock band from Edmonton, Alberta.

== History ==
With original members Jack Jaggard, Clay Shea, Shawn Moncrieff and Stefan Levasseur, Choke has toured in Canada and the US.

Choke released their first two albums independently, Lotion in 1995 and Give'er in 1996, which was later released through Smallman Records, who signed the band in 1997. Choke released Needless To Say the following year, an album that was chosen by Exclaim! magazine as one of the top ten punk albums of the year. 1999 saw the release of Foreword. A departure from the skate-punk sound that defined Needless to Say, Foreword was described jokingly by Shea as the "career killer". Despite this, Exclaim! magazine called the album "a tremendous accomplishment by punk standards". Foreword cemented the band's reputation as one of Canada's top punk acts, alongside Propagandhi, Painted Thin, and I Spy.

In 2002, There's A Story To This Moral was released, followed by 2005's Slow Fade Or How I Learned To Question Infinity. The latter was recorded in Vancouver, with Blair Calibaba (Gob, Propagandhi) and Paul Forgues (Slayer, Nine Inch Nails, Treble Charger), and became the fifth release through Smallman Records. The band was heralded by Exclaim! as "...one of the finest technically progressive bands on the planet."

== Breakup ==
In 2007, the band split up after the tour that ended in Edmonton on June 9. Band members Shawn Moncrieff and Clay Shea started a new band, Passenger Action, with Ryan Podlubny (ex. The Fullblast, Fordirelifesake) and Allan Harding (ex. Thirty Nights of Violence, Sleeping Girl, and Path of a Logical Liar).

In 2013, the band reunited for a tour.

In 2022, the band began playing live shows and recorded a new song "Out of Sync". 2024 saw the band play more shows, now with new guitarist Greg Wright.

Choke released a new single, “Pivot”, in November 2025, and announced a tour supporting Protest the Hero.

== Band members ==
- Jack Jaggard – guitar, vocals
- Shawn Moncrieff – guitar, vocals
- Clay Shea – bass guitar, vocals
- Graham Churchill – drums

Former members

- Stefan Levasseur – drums

== Discography ==
- Lotion (1994)
- Give'er (1995)
- Needless to Say (1998)
- Foreword (1999)
- Across the Water (Split with Adhesive, Layaway Plan & Astream) (2001)
- There's a Story to This Moral (2002)
- Slow Fade Or: How I Learned to Question Infinity (2005)
- "Out of Sync" - Single (2022)
- ”Pivot” - Single (2026)

== See also ==
- List of bands from Canada
