= There's a Story to This Moral =

Studio album by Choke
- Released: April 12, 2002
- Genre: Punk rock, melodic hardcore, post-hardcore, skate punk
- Length: 42:59
- Label: Smallman, Small Man Music
- Producer: Paul Forgues

Choke chronology
Across the Water (2001)	There's a Story to This Moral (2002)	Slow Fade Or: How I Learned to Question Infinity (2005)

There's a Story to This Moral is the fifth album by Canadian punk rock group Choke. It was released through Smallman Records in 2002.

== Reception ==
Professional ratings
Review scores
Source	Rating
Allmusic	3/5 stars

AllMusic reviewer Jason MacNeil stated that "this quartet walks the thin tightrope between nu-metal, '80s heavy metal, and emo rock smartly, making each tune twist and turn to suit their needs. ... the influences range from punk revival groups such as blink-182 to even the art rock riffs of Rush", giving the album a rating of three stars.

== Track listing ==
All songs written and composed by Choke.

1. "Far from True" – 4:44
2. "Concrete Timeline" – 3:57
3. "Every Word" – 2:56
4. "Signing Off" – 4:09
5. "Forget to Learn" – 2:40
6. "Fallout Leader" – 5:29
7. "Record Stop" – 5:07
8. "Framed in Poor Light" – 4:21
9. "Fourteen Days" – 3:27
10. "The Hardest Things to See Are on Display" – 6:15

== Personnel ==
- Jack Jaggard – guitar, vocals
- Shawn Moncrieff – guitar, vocals
- Clay Shea – bass guitar, vocals
- Stefan Levasseur – drums
