= God Loves Fiasco =

Studio album by Fiasco
- Released: June 24, 2007
- Recorded: January – March, 2007 in Brooklyn
- Genre: Noise rock, punk rock
- Label: Beautiful Records
- Producer: Fiasco

Fiasco chronology
God Loves Fiasco (2007)	Native Canadians (2008)

God Loves Fiasco is the first full-length album by the band Fiasco.

== Track listing ==
1. "Hot House" - 4:02
2. "Fed Up" - 1:31
3. "Vertical Litter" - 2:16
4. "Sir Gentleman" - 1:16
5. "Jonathan's Voice Cracks" - 0:05
6. "Wild Goose Chase Rag" - 3:23
7. "Stargaze" - 7:35
8. "Stop That" - 1:21
9. "Nothing To Lose" - 3:15
10. "0157:H7" - Spy Song" - 2:20
11. "Rod Ferrell" - 4:27
12. "Disappointment" - 5:49
13. "Shot In My Sleep" - 3:55
14. "TK-421" - 1:07
15. "True Story" - The Aquarium" - 5:17
16. "We Think You're Wrong" - 1:34
17. "Execute Order 66" - 4:07
18. "Red Delicious" - 3:30
19. "Song For Ian" - 5:17
20. "Jonathan Messes Up" - 0:09
21. "You Never Know" - 2:46
22. "Träume" - 4:04
23. "Don't Mind The Killings" - 9:12

== Personnel ==
- Jonathan Edelstein - Guitar, vocals
- Julian Bennett Holmes - drums
- Lucian Buscemi - Bass, Vocals
