= Glue Gun (band) =

American punk rock band

- Also known as: Glü Gun
- Origin: Woodland Hills, California, U.S.
- Genres: Punk
- Years active: 1991–1997, 2005–2006, 2011–present
- Labels: Posh Boy (1993–1995); Fearless (1995–1996)
- Members: Bob Oedy; Joey Rimicci; Eric Bootow; Garrett Dyer
- Past members: Jeff Roberts; Pete Newbury; Jeff Edwards; Chris Long; George Snow; John North; Jody Kern; Kile Garcia

Glue Gun (briefly known as Glü Gun) is an American punk rock band that formed in Los Angeles in 1991 by The Grim's Bob Oedy, who is the lead singer and only constant member as of the band's reunion. To date, the band has released two full-length studio albums. They split up in 1997, but reformed in 2005, broke up again in 2006 and then reformed five years later for a second time in 2011.

== History ==
=== Beginnings and Just Glü It ===
The band started in 1991 under the name Glue Gun with founding members: Jeff Roberts (guitars), Pete Newbury (bass), Mike (drums) and singer Bob Oedy (previously founding guitar player of The Grim). Jeff Edwards replaced Mike and Glue Gun made their first appearance on the Welcome to Califucknia compilation put out by Signal Sound Systems Records in 1992. Chris Long (guitars) joined, and then the band signed a deal with Posh Boy Records. Posh Boy label owner Robbie Fields first came across the band when asked to check out another Posh Boy signing Das Klown at a small Hollywood club in 1993. Their debut album had already been recorded and was prepped for self-release when Fields urged the band to allow Posh Boy to step in and re-package the material for commercial release. At the same time, Fields recommended to the band the alternative spelling of Glü Gun, to avoid confusion with a different New Jersey band calling themselves Glue Gun who had already asserted their claim to the name. The album was re-sequenced and eventually released under the title Just Glü It in 1994; the album was only moderately successful. Soon after, the band reverted to using the original "Glue Gun" spelling.

=== The Scene Is Not for Sale and breakup ===
By the end of 1994, Glue Gun regrouped and added three new band members: George Snow on guitars, John North on bass and Jody Kern on drums. Oedy and Roberts were the only two remaining members at the time. They released their second album The Scene Is Not for Sale in 1995. Although The Scene Is Not for Sale was not as successful as Just Glü It, it has been regarded by some critics as a minor classic, but during its release the album received good reviews. Before their next album could be recorded, Glue Gun called it quits around 1997.

=== Reunion and recent activities ===
In 2005, Oedy reformed Glue Gun and recruited three Jughead's Revenge members Joey Rimicci (guitars), Brian Priess (bass) and Andy Alverez (drums). The band demoed ten new songs for a new album, which remained unreleased as of October 2013. In May 2006, the band posted two new songs for the upcoming release, "Plastic Bomb" (a cover of Poison Idea) and "Shadow Government", on Myspace.

The band also played two concerts in July 2006 at Harpers and the Venice Community Center, which was their first performance in ten years, and one on October 29, 2006, at the CIA in North Hollywood, California. The shows brought old fans out of the woodwork and were very successful. This also marked the first live performance for the ex Jugheads members since their breakup in 2001. After these live shows, Glue Gun parted ways again while the members continued work on their own projects.

Glue Gun announced another reunion in February 2011, this time with the Scene Is Not for Sale lineup. The band has been playing shows periodically since then, mostly in Southern California.

== Line-Ups ==
Year	Band				Recordings
Year	Vocalist	Guitarist	Bassist	Drummer	Recordings
1991–1994	Bob Oedy	Jeff Roberts, Chris Long	Pete Newbury	Jeff Edwards	Just Glü It
1994–1997	Bob Oedy	Jeff Roberts, George "Horhay" Snow	John North	Jody Kern	The Scene Is Not for Sale
1997–2005	SPLIT				
2005–2006	Bob Oedy	Joey Rimicci	Brian Priess	Andy Alverez	Unreleased single feat. Plastic Bomb and Shadow Gov't
2006–2011	SPLIT				
2011–2015	Bob	George	John	Jody	Kile
2015–present	Bob	Joe	Eric	Garrett	

== Discography ==
Year	Title	Label	Format	Other information
1992	Welcome to Califucknia	Signal Sound Systems Records	CD/cassette	Eva's Got a Mohawk; Out of print
1994	Just Glü It	Posh Boy	CD	Debut album; Out of print as of now.
1995	The Scene Is Not for Sale	Fearless	CD/LP	Out of print as of now.; Final album before disbanding.
