= Hippos of Doom =

- Origin: Huntington Beach, California
- Genres: Christian hardcore, hardcore punk, pop punk, punk rock
- Years active: 2013–present
- Labels: Thumper Punk
- Members: Old Hippo; The Masked Hippo; Captain Hippo; Indiana Jak
- Website: facebook.com/hipposofdoom

Hippos of Doom is an American Christian hardcore band, and they primarily play hardcore punk and punk rock. They come from Huntington Beach, California. The band started making music in 2013, and their members are lead vocalist and bassist, Old Hippo, lead guitarist and background vocalist, The Masked Hippo, left handed guitarist and background vocalist, Captain Hippo, and left handed drummer, Indiana Jak. Their first extended play, Road Trip, was released in 2013 by Thumper Punk Records.

== Background ==
Hippos of Doom is a Christian hardcore band from Huntington Beach, California. Their members are lead vocalist and bassist, Old Hippo, lead guitarist and background vocalist, The Masked Hippo, left handed guitarist and background vocalist, Captain Hippo, and left handed drummer, Indiana Jak.

== Music history ==
The band commenced as a musical entity in 2013, with their release, Road Trip, an extended play, that was released by Thumper Punk Records on April 16, 2013. Their next album, Brotherhood, was released independently, in 2008. They released, City of the One, with Wounded Records, on June 15, 2010.

== Members ==
Current members

- Old Hippo - lead vocals, bass
- Masked Hippo - guitar, background vocals
- Captain Hippo - left handed guitar, background vocals
- Indiana Jak - left handed drums

== Discography ==
EPs

- Road Trip (April 16, 2013, Thumper Punk)
