= The Lonely Revolts =

US musical group

- Origin: Salinas, California
- Genres: Christian punk, punk rock, Oi!
- Years active: 2011-present
- Label: Thumper Punk
- Members: Josh Galvan; Lupe Gutierrez; Chip Fratangelo
- Past members: Connor Bonstein; Seth Boren
- Website: thelonelyrevolts.com

The Lonely Revolts are an American Christian punk band, who primarily play punk rock and Oi!. They are from Salinas, California, and they were formed in 2011 by Josh Galvan and Lupe Gutierrez. The Lonely Revolts include Josh Galvan (Guitar & Vocals), Lupe Gutierrez (Bass & Vocals) and Chip Fratangelo (Drums).

Having contributed tracks to "Punk Never Dies Vol.1" (2011), "Punk For The Gospel Vol. 1" (2012), and the "Kicking It Old School" 7 inch (2012) compilations, The Lonely Revolts released their debut album "Remnant" on Thumper Punk Records on October 30, 2012.

== Discography ==
Studio albums

- Remnant - CD/Digital Download (October 30, 2012, Thumper Punk)
- Broken Bones Burning Hearts (January 30, 2015, Thumper Punk)

Acoustic albums

- Remnant - (Lights Out) (January 16, 2013, Thumper Punk)

Other album appearances

- Punk Never Dies Vol. 1 - V/A Digital Download (2011, Indie Vision)
- Punk For The Gospel Vol. 1 - V/A CD/Digital Download (2012, Thumper Punk)
- Kickin It Old School - V/A 7"/Digital Download (2012, Veritas Vinyl)
