= Diazepunk =

dIAZEPUNK
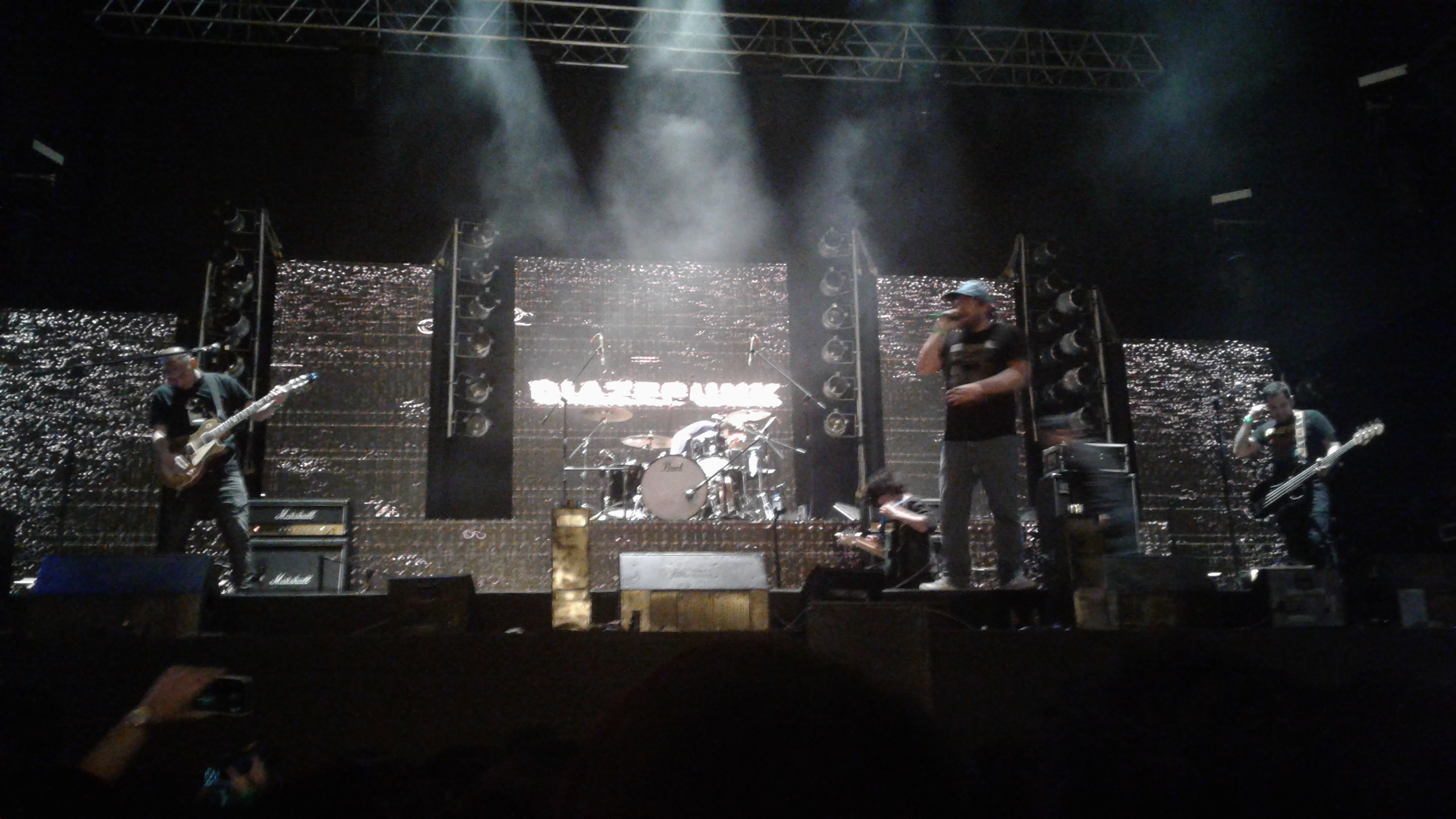
- Diazepunk, alternative, 2018

Background information
- Origin: Lima, Peru
- Genres: Punk rock, Pop punk
- Years active: 2001–present
- Labels: Unión Discos
- Members: Carlos Garcia; Gustavo Makino; Takeshi Nakankari; Javier Landa; Mauricio Llona; Anaís Blondett
- Website: www.diazepunk.com

Diazepunk (sometimes typeset as dIAZEPUNK) is a punk-rock band from Peru.

Diazepunk formed in 1996 with Carlos García on vocals, Gustavo Makino on guitars, Jan Lederhausen on bass, Felipe Salmón on drums and Alberto Atún on keyboards.

== Discography ==
- En Pepas (Demo tape)
- Viernes
- Bajo en Serotonina
- Rock en el Parque (Live)
- Ciudad Indifferente

== Compilations ==
- Ataque Punk
- Grita Sudamérica
- Compilatorio 23punk
- DVD Rock en el Parque VII
