= Rogue Anthem =

- Origin: United States
- Genres: Christian punk, Christian rock, punk rock
- Years active: 2010–present
- Labels: Thumper Punk
- Members: Bill B Neill B. Carter; Vulcho; Tanner
- Past members: Myke Augustat
- Website: facebook.com/RogueAnthem

Rogue Anthem is an American Christian punk and Christian rock band primarily known for their punk rock sound. The band was formed in 2012, consisting of vocalist Bill B., lead guitarist Neill B., guitarist Carter, bassist and keyboardist Vulcho, and drummer Tanner. Their former lead vocalist and rhythm guitarist, Myke Augustat, died in 2012. The band's first release, with Thumper Punk Records, What to Believe, a studio album, released in 2012.

== Background ==
Rogue Anthem is a Christian punk and Christian rock band from the United States. The band members are vocalist, Bill B., lead guitarist, Neill B., guitarist, Carter, bassist and keyboardist, Vulcho, and drummer, Tanner.

== Music history ==
The band was formed in 2012, with their debut studio album, What to Believe, released on November 14, 2012, by Thumper Punk Records.

== Members ==
Current members

- Bill B. - vocals,
- Neill B. – lead guitar
- Carter – guitar
- Vulcho – bass, keys
- Tanner – drums

== Discography ==
Studio albums

- What to Believe (November 14, 2012, Thumper Punk)
