= Turn of the Screw (album) =

Studio album by 1208
- Released: February 9, 2004
- Recorded: Stall #2, Redondo Beach, California; Steak House, North Hollywood, California
- Genre: Pop punk, punk rock
- Length: 39:24
- Label: Epitaph
- Producer: 1208, Darian Rundall, Matt Hyde

1208 chronology
Feedback Is Payback (2002)	Turn of the Screw (2004)

Professional ratings
Review scores
Source	Rating
Allmusic	4/5 stars
The Music Fix	7/10 stars
Punknews.org	3/5 stars
Europunk	3.5/5 stars
Music Emissions	4.5/5 stars

Turn of the Screw is the second studio album from punk rock band, 1208. It was released in February, 2004 and follows 2002's Feedback Is Payback – both released on Epitaph Records.

The song "Fall Apart" was featured on the popular PlayStation 2 and Xbox game Burnout 3.

== Track listing ==
- All songs written by 1208
1. "My Loss" – 3:30
2. "Fall Apart" – 3:08
3. "Tell Me Again" – 2:52
4. "Next Big Thing" – 3:04
5. "Time to Remember" – 2:33
6. "Smash the Badge" – 2:22
7. "Lost and Found" – 3:05
8. "Everyday" – 2:51
9. "From Below" – 2:36
10. "Hurts to Know" – 2:44
11. "All I Can Do" – 2:12
12. "Not You" – 3:14
13. "The Saint" – 3:12
14. "Turn of the Screw" – 1:56

== Enhanced CD content ==
1. "Next Big Thing" music video – 3:04
2. Behind the scenes video – 4:13

== Credits ==
- Alex – vocals
- Neshawn – guitar
- Bryan – bass
- Manny – drums, except tracks 10 and 13
- John Cranfield – drums on tracks 10 and 13
- Rodney Wertz – viola on track 13
- Recorded at Stall #2, Redondo Beach, California – except tracks 10 and 13 at Steak House, North Hollywood, California
- Produced by 1208 and Darian Rundall, except tracks 10 and 13 by Matt Hyde
- Engineered by Darian Rundall, except tracks 10 and 13 by Matt Hyde
- Mixed by Matt Hyde at Ameraycan
- Mastered by Eddie Schreyer at Oasis Mastering

== Enhanced CD credits ==
- "Next Big Thing" music video directed and produced by Geno and Vinny Imbriale
- "Behind the Scenes" video by Stoney Sharpe
