= True Liberty =

- Origin: Richmond, Virginia
- Genres: Christian hardcore, hardcore punk, punk rock
- Years active: 2005–present
- Labels: Raging Storm, Thumper Punk, Wounded
- Members: Mike Liberty; Tom Liberty; Aaron Liberty
- Website: truelibertyrva.com

True Liberty is an American Christian hardcore band, and they primarily play hardcore punk and punk rock. They come from Richmond, Virginia. The band started making music in 2005, and their members are lead vocalist and lead guitarist, Mike Liberty, bassist, Tom Liberty, and drummer and background vocalist, Aaron Liberty. Their first studio album, This Is War, was released in 2007 by Raging Storm Records. They independently released, Brotherhood, that came out in 2008. The studio album, City of the One, was released by Wounded Records, in 2010. Their subsequent studio album, Marked for Life, was released by Thumper Punk Records, in 2012. They released a live album, Give Me True Liberty or Give Me Death, with Thumper Punk Records, in 2014.

== Background ==
True Liberty is a Christian hardcore band from Richmond, Virginia. Their members are lead vocalist and lead guitarist, Mike Liberty, bassist, Tom Liberty, and drummer and background vocalist, Aaron Liberty.

== Music history ==
The band commenced as a musical entity in 2005, with their release, This Is War, a studio album, that was released by Raging Storm Records in 2007. Their next album, Brotherhood, was released independently, in 2008. They released, City of the One, with Wounded Records, on June 15, 2010. Their subsequent studio album, Marked for Life, was released by Thumper Punk Records, on May 22, 2012. The first live album, Give Me True Liberty or Give Me Death, was released by Thumper Punk Records, on May 22, 2014.

== Members ==
Current members

- Mike Liberty - lead vocals, lead guitar
- Tom Liberty - bass
- Aaron Liberty - drums
- Andrew Godfrey ( touring bass player)

Previous Members Tim Liberty ( bass) Allen Bays (bass)

== Discography ==
Studio albums

- This Is War (2007, Raging Storm)
- Brotherhood (2008, Independent)
- City of the One (June 15, 2010, Wounded)
- Marked for Life (May 22, 2012, Thumper Punk)

Live albums

- Give Me True Liberty or Give Me Death (May 22, 2014, Thumper Punk)
