= The F-Ups =

Punk-rock band from Minnesota

- Also known as: The Fuck-Ups, Mister Completely
- Origin: Rochester, Minnesota, United States
- Genre: Punk rock
- Years active: 1999–2006, 2020-Present
- Label: Capitol
- Members: Travis Allen; Chris DeWerd; Andy Collett; Taylor Nogo

The F-Ups are an American punk rock band from Rochester, Minnesota. Founded in 1999, signed with Capitol Records in 2003, and reunited in 2020. They are best known for their song 'Lazy Generation' which was featured on NHL 2005 and Burnout 3: Takedown, being the theme song for Takedown. Several of the members formed a new band Hang 'Em High, which itself disbanded in 2014.

== History ==
The group formed in 1999 while its members were still in high school. Originally the band was named Mr. Completely, and just prior to signing with Capitol Records in 2003 changed the name to "The F-Ups." They came second in a high school competition, but took first place the next year. They began touring locally before signing with Capitol Records in 2003. Their debut album, which featured a cover of Mott the Hoople's "All the Young Dudes", was released in July of the next year to mixed reviews.

The band drew lyrical influences from such experiences as laziness ("Lazy Generation", "I Don't Know"), rebellion against parents ("Look At Your Son Now", "Screw You") and even a Jerry Springer episode ("Crack Ho"). The group followed the album's release with appearances on the Warped Tour.

In late 2006, the group broke up, and Allen, DeWerd and Collett re-formed as Hang 'Em High (see below). Hang 'Em High disbanded in 2014.

In early 2015 Travis Allen and Taylor Nogo (Nogosek) formed a new band called The Shift with new members Cole Ebertowski (Guitar/Vocals)and Daniel Johnson (Bass). They are currently playing shows locally and plan to record a full-length album Starting in late October 2015.

The F-ups returned to music with all original members in 2020. They have an active YouTube channel and social media.

== Album ==
Screw You

Studio album by The F-Ups
- Released: July 13, 2004
- Genres: Punk rock, pop punk
- Length: 29:52
- Label: Capitol
- Producer: Brynn Arens

Professional ratings
Review scores
Source	Rating
ThePunkSite.com	(4.2/5)
Allmusic.com	2/5 stars

Track listing

- All lyrics written by The F-Ups.
- All music written by Travis Allen, except on "All The Young Dudes", by Travis Allen and David Bowie.
- Album title: The F-Ups
1. "Lazy Generation" - 2:24
2. "Screw You" - 2:34
3. "Look At Your Son Now" - 2:44
4. "Glad That I Lost You" - 2:27
5. "I Don't Know" - 2:10
6. "All the Young Dudes (Mott the Hoople cover)" - 3:06
7. "Falling Down" - 3:35
8. "Wrong The Right" - 2:24
9. "Told You So" - 2:33
10. "Eye For An Eye" - 2:12
11. "Crack Ho" - 2:48
12. "No No No" - 2:35

=== Credits ===
- Travis Allen - lead vocals, lead guitar
- Chris DeWerd - rhythm guitar, vocals
- Andy Collett - bass guitar, backing vocals
- Taylor Nogosek - drums

== Members ==
- Travis Allen - lead vocals, guitar
- Taylor Nogo - drums, vocals
- Andy Collett - bass guitar, vocals
- Chris deWerd - guitar, vocals

== Hang 'Em High ==
Hang 'Em High
- Origin: Rochester, Minnesota
- Genres: Punk rock, Rock n roll
- Years active: 2006–2009, 2011-2014
- Past members: Chris DeWerd; Bill Martin; Andy Collett; Alex Allen

After The F-Ups break up in 2006, Travis Allen, Chris DeWerd and Andy Collett reformed with Bill Martin and Alex Allen (Travis' brother) as Hang 'Em High. Hang 'Em High released their debut album (called "Hang 'Em High") which is only available on Hang 'Em High's Myspace page. They performed at various venues and also an online venue called "Deep Rock Drive". Hang 'Em High released several YouTube videos under the name of "Doctornoise". Polls on their official website show that the fans' favourite song is "Old School Fight Song" and the fans' second favourite song is "Not For Me". Bill Martin left the band in 2009 to begin a solo project. The band has finished in May 2009.

== Album ==
Hang 'Em High

Studio album by Hang 'Em High
- Released: January 1, 2008
- Recorded: 2007
- Genres: Punk rock, Rock and roll
- Label: Myspace download

Track listing

- All music and lyrics written by Hang 'Em High.
1. "Overwhelming"
2. "Last To Fall"
3. "Just Back Down"
4. "One World"
5. "Cabin Fever"
6. "I Wanna Know"
7. "Full Throttle"
8. "Not For Me"
9. "Old School Fight Song"
10. "It's Alright"
11. "Goodbye For Now"
12. "Sincity Murder"
13. "Just The Way We Are"
14. "Fade To Red"

Credits

- Bill Martin - lead vocals
- Travis Allen - lead guitar, vocals
- Chris deWerd - rhythm guitar, vocals
- Andy Collett - bass guitar
- Alex Allen - drums

== Album ==
Back in Session

EP by Hang 'Em High
- Released: March 27, 2012
- Recorded: 2011
- Genres: rock n roll, High Energy Rock
- Label: Website download

Track listing

- All music and lyrics written by Hang 'Em High.
1. "Back in Session (Rock & Roll)"
2. "Just Got Yourself to Blame"
3. "One Night Stand"
4. "Hitting the Bottle"
5. "Wasting My Time" (On the CD e.p only)

== Album ==
The Shift

Studio album by The Shift
- Released: March 2015
- Recorded: 2015
- Genres: Pop rock, rock and roll
- Label: Independent

Track listing

- All music and lyrics written by The Shift.
1. "Want You To Want"
2. "Taking You Home"
3. "Lay Down"
4. "Dont Give Up"
5. "This is it"

Members 2015–present

- Travis Allen - Guitar/ Lead Vocals
- Cole Ebertowski - Guitar/ Vocals
- Clay Ebertowski - Bass guitar/ Vocals
- Taylor Nogosek - Drums
- Alec Tackmann - Keyboards/ Percussion

== Games ==
The song Lazy Generation was featured in NHL 2005 & Burnout 3: Takedown, with the song being the theme song of Takedown, but the line shit on a silver platter shines was changed to Gold on a silver platter shines.
