= Feedback Is Payback =

Studio album by 1208
- Released: February 12, 2002
- Recorded: Stall #2, Redondo Beach, California, USA
- Genre: Punk rock, melodic hardcore
- Length: 39:36
- Label: Epitaph
- Producer: Darian Rundall, Fletcher Dragge

1208 chronology
Feedback Is Payback (2002)	Turn of the Screw (2004)

Professional ratings
Review scores
Source	Rating
Allmusic	4/5 stars

Feedback Is Payback is the debut album from 1208. It was released in February, 2002 on Epitaph Records and was followed by Turn of the Screw in 2004. The album was co-produced by Fletcher Dragge of fellow punk band, Pennywise.

== Track listing ==
- All songs written by 1208
1. "1988" – 3:28
2. "Lies That Lie" – 2:33
3. "Just Anyone" – 2:46
4. "Outside Looking In" – 2:46
5. "Scared Away" – 3:08
6. "Erase 'em All" – 2:45
7. "Pick Your Poison" – 3:18
8. "Jimmy" – 2:54
9. "Lightshow" – 2:22
10. "Retire" – 2:22
11. "Slowburn" – 3:14
12. "What I Saw" – 2:40
13. "Speak Easy" – 2:29
14. "Obstructure" – 2:51

== Credits ==
- Alex – vocals, guitar
- Neshawn – guitar
- Bryan – bass
- Manny – drums
- Recorded at Stall #2, Redondo Beach, California, USA
- Produced and mixed by Darian Rundall and Fletcher Dragge
- Engineered by Darian Rundall
- Mastered by Gene Grimaldi at Oasis Mastering
