= Fiasco (band) =

American music group

- Origin: Brooklyn, New York, United States
- Genres: Hardcore punk (early); Noise rock Math rock
- Years active: 2005–2012
- Labels: Impose
- Members: Jonathan Edelstein; Lucian Buscemi; Julian Bennett Holmes
- Website: Official Bandcamp

Fiasco was an American, Brooklyn-based trio, formed in October 2005 by Jonathan Edelstein (guitar/vocals), Julian Bennett Holmes (drums), and Lucian Buscemi (electric bass/vocals), although all three are multi-instrumentalists. They were known for their intense, high-energy music, their energetic live shows, and for playing off the venue's stage, in the round. They drew influences from early 1980s hardcore punk bands such as Minor Threat, Flipper and Bad Brains, as well as more recent noise and indie rock bands such as Lightning Bolt, Fugazi, and Shellac, and math rock bands including Hella and Don Caballero.

== History ==
Fiasco formed in 2005 in Park Slope, Brooklyn, New York, United States. On June 24, 2007, Fiasco released "God Loves Fiasco," their 23-track debut on their own Beautiful Records label, receiving positive reviews from Spin, among others.

On May 14, 2008, the band announced that they signed to independent Brooklyn label Impose Records, and would be releasing a new LP entitled Native Canadians, which they said will be released in a package containing the 12" vinyl record and a CD. Impose is the same independent label that also released fellow Brooklyn band; Total Slacker, in 2010.

On June 17, 2008, the band announced on their Myspace that they would have their first national concert tour in August 2008, in order to promote Native Canadians prior to its release, which was later revealed would be October 14, 2008.

Fiasco "Oh, You Horny Monster!" (2008)
30 second sample from "Oh, You Horny Monster" by Fiasco.

On August 29, 2008, they released their first music video, for the instrumental "Oh, You Horny Monster!" on Pitchfork.tv, to promote the upcoming release of Native Canadians. In May 2009, The Homosexuals announced that Fiasco, along with existing members Bruno Wizard and Mike Dos Santos, would be the new lineup of The Homosexuals. In July 2009, Fiasco announced that they were recording a new LP.

In July 2012, after seven years, they called it quits due to other commitments.

== Press and film ==
Fiasco was covered in Spin, Oh My Rockness, CMJ, The New York Times, New York Magazine and others.

The band performs in the documentary Joe Strummer: The Future Is Unwritten, which prompted the band to play at the opening of the film at the Sarajevo Film Festival.

== Discography ==
- God Loves Fiasco (Beautiful Records, June 24, 2007)
- Native Canadians (Impose Records, October 14, 2008)
- Fabulous Bozo EP (Internet only, 2009)
- Sinus Rhythm Breakdown - Single (2012)
