= 1208 (band) =

American punk rock band

- Origin: Hermosa Beach, California, USA
- Genres: Punk rock Pop punk Melodic hardcore
- Years active: 1994–2007
- Label: Epitaph Records (2001-2007)
- Members: Alex Flynn; Neshawn Hubbard; Manny McNamara; Bryan Parks
- Website: http://www.1208music.com/

1208 (generally pronounced "twelve-o-eight" or "twelve-zero-eight") was an American punk rock band from Hermosa Beach, California that formed in 1994.

The name "1208" came from the apartment number they first shared. They released two full-length studio albums on Epitaph Records: Feedback Is Payback (2002) and Turn of the Screw (2004). Their song "Fall Apart" from Turn of The Screw was featured on the popular PlayStation 2 and Xbox game Burnout 3: Takedown.

In November 2006, the band was reported to be working on a third album, however the album never materialized.

1208 reunited in 2009 for a one-off show with T.S.O.L. All original members performed, with the exception of drummer Manny McNamara. Deviates drummer Donald Conrad filled in on drums. Singer Alex Flynn is the nephew of Black Flag founder Greg Ginn and artist Raymond Pettibon.

== Members ==
- Alex Flynn - vocals
- Neshawn Hubbard - guitar
- Bryan Parks - bass
- Manny McNamara - drums

== Discography ==
- Feedback Is Payback (2002)
- Turn of the Screw (2004)

== Singles ==
- "Scared Away" from Feedback Is Payback
- "Jimmy" from Feedback Is Payback
- "Next Big Thing" from Turn of the Screw

== Music videos ==
- "Scared Away" (2002)
- "Jimmy" (2002)
- "Next Big Thing" (2004)

== Compilation Appearances ==
- "Extreme Sound Excursion" (2001)
- "Extreme Sound Sampler" (2002)
- "Punk-O-Rama 7" (2002)
- "Rock Sound Volumen 49" (2002)
- "Rock Sound Volume 63" (2002)
- "Vans Off The Wall Volume V" (2002)
- "Radio Disaster Volume 3" (2002)
- "Punk-O-Rama 2002 Tour" (2002)
- "Rock Sound Volume 71" (2004)
- "Rock Sound Volume 84" (2004)
- "Punk-O-Rama Volume 9" (2004)
- "Core Tour Sports & Music Festival Volume One" (2004)
- "Vans Warped Tour (2004 Tour Compilation)" (2004)
- "Forever Free - A Sublime Tribute Album" (2006)

== Video Appearances ==
- "Epitaph's Wilder Kingdom 8" (2002)
- "Appetite For Deconstruction - A Punk-Rockumentary" (2006)
