= Just Glü It =

Studio album by Glue Gun
- Released: April 1994
- Recorded: 1993–1994
- Genre: Punk
- Length: 36:12
- Label: Posh Boy

Glue Gun chronology
Just Glü It (1994)	The Scene Is Not for Sale (1995)

Just Glü It is the debut album by the L.A. punk rock band Glue Gun. It was released in April 1994 (see 1994 in music). At this time, the band was known simply as Glü Gun until changing their name to Glue Gun after the release of this album.

== Track listing ==
1. "Condoms Can Save the World" – 2:03
2. "Eva's Got a Mohawk" – 1:28
3. "Suddenly You're Gone" – 2:17
4. "Enter the Slaughterhouse" – 3:37
5. "Six Pack of Blondes" – 2:36
6. "Blanket of Scars" – 1:32
7. "L.A.P.D. (Army of the Rich)" – 3:06
8. "Stand in Defiance" – 1:52
9. "Let's Rob a Convenience Store" – 1:57
10. "Bloodstains" (Agent Orange cover) – 1:38
11. "Television Man" – 2:35
12. "Peace Through Unconsciousness" – 1:57
13. "Here Comes the Hammer" – 2:39 *
14. "Mourning Would" – 3:12
15. "Sudden Disappearance" – 1:57
16. "The Devil May Care" – 2:03
17. "Inner Prison" – 1:56

== Notes ==
- Available for downloading at MySpace
