= The Scene Is Not for Sale =

Studio album by Glue Gun
- Released: November 11, 1995
- Recorded: 1995
- Genre: Punk
- Length: 21:56
- Label: Fearless

Glue Gun chronology
Just Glü It (1994)	The Scene Is Not for Sale (1995)

The Scene Is Not for Sale is the second and last album by the L.A. punk rock band Glue Gun. It was released in November 1995.

== Track listing ==
1. "Drug Life"
2. "The Scene Is Not for Sale"
3. "Happy Forever"
4. "Self Respect"
5. "Powder Keg"
6. "Land of Treason"
7. "No Not Never"
8. "Problem Child"
9. "Confess"
10. "Inside of Me"
11. "Skate the Haight"
12. "Rock & Roll Star"

== Notes ==
- "Land of Treason" is a cover of the Germs and "Problem Child" is a cover of Wasted Youth.
