= Adhesive (band) =

Swedish punk rock band

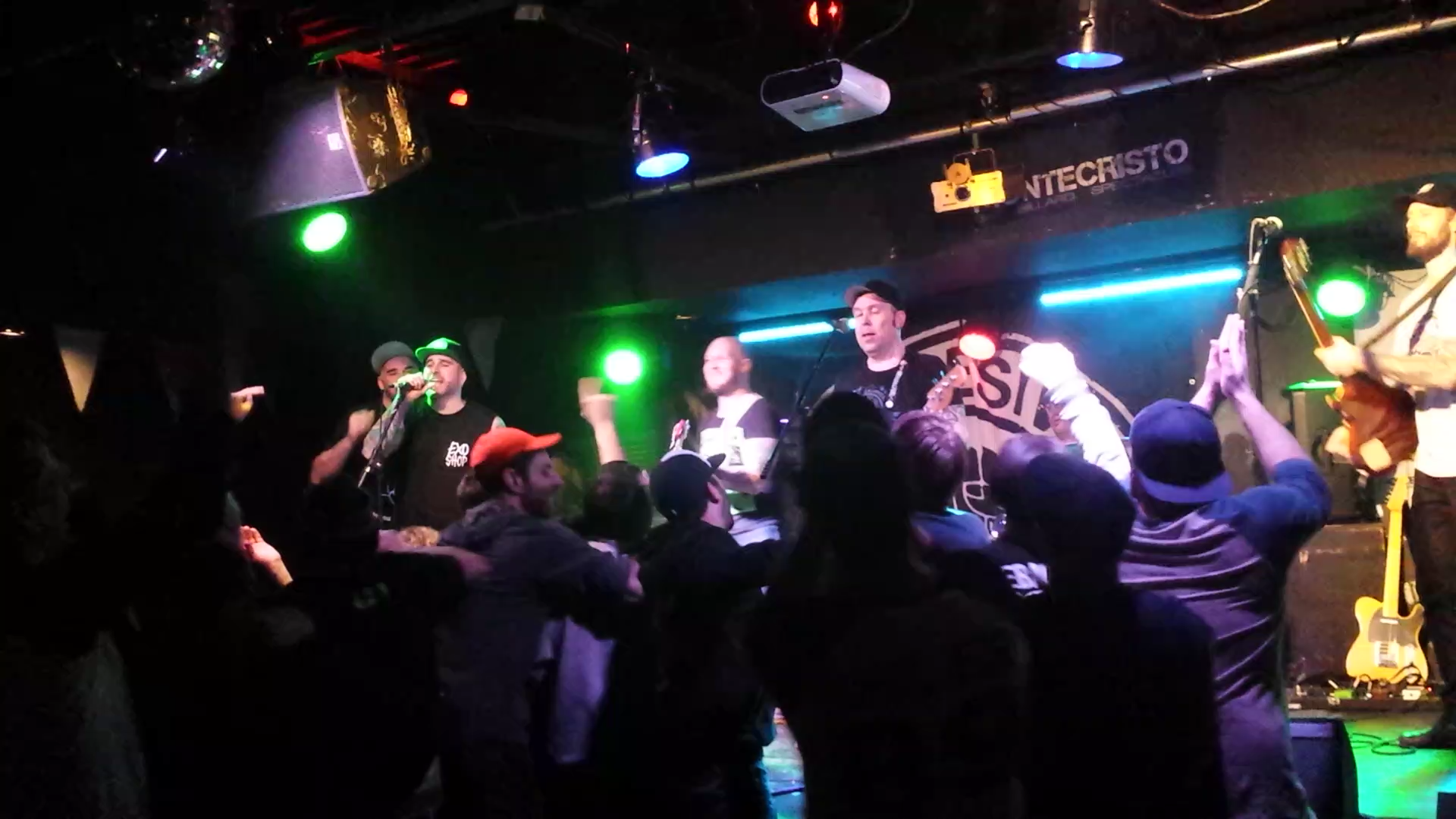
Adhesive photographed in Ste. Thérèse, Québec, Canada inside the Montecristo.

Adhesive is a Swedish punk rock band that was active between 1994 and 2002 and reunited in 2017. Though Adhesive played the majority of their concerts in the band's native Sweden, they also toured throughout Europe and North America. All of the Adhesive back catalog is out of print.

Former band members currently perform in such groups as We Live In Trenches, The Typewriter Romantics, Haveri, The Indecision Alarm, The New Mess, Straitjacket Generation and Dia Psalma.

In 2017, the band reunited to play live shows and is donating all the money they receive from their concerts to charity.

== Band members: original line-up ==
- Robert Samsonowitz - Drums
- Micke Claesson (later changed last name to Fritz) - Vocals and guitar
- Geir Pedersen - Vocals and bass
- Mathias Andersson - Guitar and vocals (Mathias later left the band and Pontus Bednarz replaced him)

== Discography ==
=== Albums ===
- Sideburner (Ampersand, 1996)
- From Left to Right (Ampersand, 1998)
- We Got the Beat (Ampersand, 2000)

=== EPs ===
- Yoghurt (Brööl Records, 1995)
- On a Pedestal (Ampersand, 1996)
- Prefab Life (Ampersand, 1998)

=== Splits ===
- No Better, No Worse (split with Pridebowl, Bad Taste Records,1998)

=== Demos ===
- Thrust & Burn (Self Released, 1994)
