= A Common Goal =

American Christian punk band

- Origin: Boston, Massachusetts
- Genres: Christian rock, Christian alternative rock, punk rock
- Years active: 2009–present
- Labels: Thumper Punk
- Members: Mike May; Scott Grenon; Brett Ennis; Jason Autrey
- Website: facebook.com/acommongoal

A Common Goal is an American Christian punk band, and they primarily play punk rock and alternative rock. They come from Boston, Massachusetts. The band started making music in 2009, and their members are lead vocalist and guitarist, Mike May, lead guitarist and background vocalist, Scott Grenon, bassist and background vocalist, Brett Ennis, and drummer and background vocalist, Jason Autrey. The band have released one extended play, For God and Country, in 2013, with Thumper Punk Records. Their first studio album, Blessings and Battles, was released in 2013 by Thumper Punk Records.

== Background ==
A Common Goal is a Christian punk band from Boston, Massachusetts. Their members are lead vocalist and guitarist, Mike May, lead guitarist and background vocalist, Scott Glenon, bassist and background vocalist, Brett Ennis, and drummer and background vocalist, Jason Autrey.

== Music history ==
The band commenced as a musical entity in 2009 with their release, For God and Country, an extended play, that was released by Thumper Punk Records on March 29, 2013. They released, a studio album, Blessings and Battles, on May 1, 2013, with Thumper Punk Records.

== Members ==
Current members

- Mike May - lead vocals, guitar
- Scott Grenon - guitar, background vocals
- Brett Ennis - bass, background vocals
- Jason Autrey - drums, background vocals

== Discography ==
Studio albums

- Blessings and Battles (May 1, 2013, Thumper Punk)

EPs

- For God and Country (March 29, 2013 Thumper Punk)
