= No Lost Cause =

American Christian punk band

- Origin: New Jersey
- Genres: Christian punk, Christian ska, pop punk, punk rock, skate punk, ska, ska-punk
- Years active: 2010–present
- Labels: Thumper Punk
- Members: Rob Jensen; Nick Povilonis
- Website: facebook.com/NoLostCause

No Lost Cause is an American Christian punk and Christian ska band, and they primarily play punk rock, pop punk, ska, skate punk, and ska-punk. The band is from Toms River, New Jersey and was started in 2010 by vocalist and guitarist, Rob Jensen. The current lineup consists of Rob Jensen and Nick Povilonis. The band's first release, with Thumper Punk Records, NLC, an extended play, released in 2013, followed by the "Fight EP" in 2015.

== Background ==
No Lost Cause is a Christian punk and Christian ska band from Winter Garden, FL. The band members are vocalist and guitarist, Rob Jensen and drummer, Nick Povilonis.

== Music history ==
The band commenced as a musical entity in 2010, with their first release, N.L.C., an extended play, that was released on May 22, 2013, by Thumper Punk Records. Their second extended play, Fight, was released on August 19, 2015, from Thumper Punk Records.

== Members ==
Current members

- Rob Jensen – vocals, guitar
- Nick Povilonis – drums

== Discography ==
EPs

- N.L.C. (May 22, 2013, Thumper Punk)
- Fight (August 19, 2015, Thumper Punk)
- In Stereo (split ep with Peter118, released September 4, 2017, Thumper Punk)
