= Chaos Rules: Live at the Trocadero =

Live album by the Dead Milkmen
- Released: November 8, 1994
- Recorded: 1992–1994
- Venues: Trocadero Theatre, Chinatown, Philadelphia, Pennsylvania
- Genre: Punk
- Label: Restless

The Dead Milkmen chronology
| Not Richard, But Dick (1993) | Chaos Rules: Live at the Trocadero (1994) | Stoney's Extra Stout (Pig) (1995) |

Chaos Rules: Live at the Trocadero is a live album by the punk band the Dead Milkmen. It was released by Restless Records on November 8, 1994. Chaos Rules contains one song from Soul Rotation and none from Not Richard, But Dick, as the group could not work out a deal with Hollywood Records, their former record label.

== Venue ==
The album was recorded at the Trocadero Theatre, in the band's hometown of Philadelphia. The Trocadero also served as the venue for the Dead Milkmen's first reunion show, in 2004, performed in honor of their late bass player, Dave Schulthise.

== Critical reception ==
Professional ratings
Review scores
| Source | Rating |
|---|---|
| AllMusic | 2/5 stars |
| Entertainment Weekly | C |
| MusicHound Rock: The Essential Album Guide | 2/5 stars |
| The Virgin Encyclopedia of Eighties Music | 2/5 stars |

The Tennessean wrote that the album "showcases the Milkmen at their anarchistic best." Trouser Press called the album "a slapdash greatest-hits concert record," writing that "most of the renditions are surprisingly worse than the originals."

AllMusic wrote that the songs "document the group's prime period, even if these versions don't quite compare to the originals."

== Track listing ==
All tracks by Dead Milkmen

1. "Tiny Town"
2. "I Walk the Thinnest Line"
3. "Smokin' Banana Peels"
4. "Surfin' Cow"
5. "Bitchin' Camaro"
6. "Where the Tarantula Lives"
7. "Nutrition"
8. "Big Lizard"
9. "The Thing That Only Eats Hippies"
10. "I Hate You, I Love You"
11. "Lucky"
12. "V.F.W."
13. "Punk Rock Girl"
14. "Rastabilly"
15. "Stuart"
16. "Right Wing Pigeons"
17. "Tacoland"
18. "Laundromat Song"
19. "Swordfish"
20. "If I Had a Gun"

== Personnel ==
- Rodney Anonymous - keyboards, vocals
- Dave Blood – bass
- Dean Clean – drums
- Joe Jack Talcum – guitar, vocals
