= Bitchin' Camaro =

1985 song by The Dead Milkmen

Song by the Dead Milkmen

from the album Big Lizard in My Backyard
- Released: June 1985
- Studio: Third Story Recording (Philadelphia, Pennsylvania)
- Genre: Comedy rock; punk rock
- Length: 3:01
- Label: Restless
- Songwriters: Joseph Genaro; Dave Schulthise; Rodney Linderman; Dean Sabatino
- Producers: Bob Dickie; John Wicks

"Bitchin' Camaro" is a song by American rock band the Dead Milkmen, released on their debut album Big Lizard in My Backyard (1985). The song was written by vocalist Rodney Linderman, guitarist and vocalist Joseph Genaro, bassist Dave Schulthise, and drummer Dean Sabatino. The track contains an extended, rambling intro of two characters having a conversation, after which the song shifts into a hardcore punk song about the bitchin' Chevrolet Camaro.

Though not a single, the song was the band's first to achieve popularity and airplay on college radio stations in the U.S. It is considered one of the band's best-known songs, alongside their later 1988 hit "Punk Rock Girl".

== Background ==
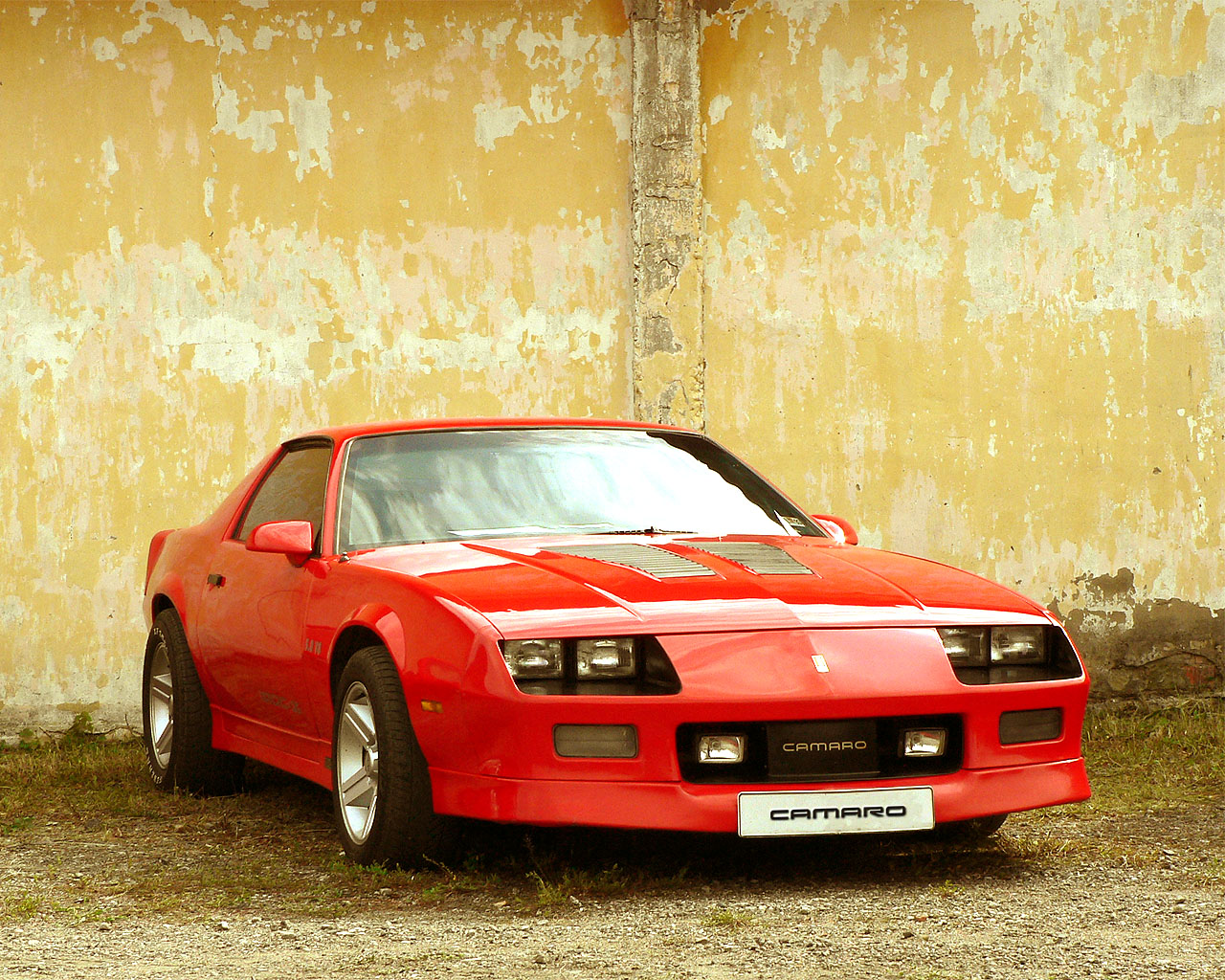
Chevrolet Camaro IROC-Z

The song features an extended introduction over a bluesy bassline of two characters speaking to one another. It parodies partying, rich kids, and surfer culture. Linderman got the idea for the tune after overhearing a conversation. He and Genaro told the band at rehearsal they would be improvising an intro to the song, and Schulthise began playing the bassline. After that, the song was completed. Linderman portrays the "talking-too-fast jokester" while Genaro acts as a "clueless airhead". The two individuals discuss going to the shore and Doors cover bands before arriving at the point of the song: the titular vehicle. From there, the song shifts into a hardcore punk song. The song's hardcore segment was inspired by the Suicidal Tendencies song "Institutionalized". Daniel Brockman, in a review for the website Vanyaland, says that in its quiet-loud dynamic, the track is not far removed musically from the band's forebears, comparing its style to the Dead Kennedys and Circle Jerks.

WXPN in Philadelphia was an "early champion" of the tune, according to Sabatino; they played the homemade demo frequently which led to audience attendees knowing the song in full before its proper album release. Though not a single, the song achieved airplay on college radio stations across the U.S. The song was later featured in the Orange Is the New Black episode "Appropriately Sized Pots".

== Reception ==
A 1985 review by Spin underground columnist Andrea 'Enthal calls it "an '80s answer to the Beach Boys car-and-surf songs, [which] blisters with high-speed drum bash and the ranted [lyrics]." Jason Heller of The A.V. Club considers the song a sendup of "white-trash culture", and describes the song as "a hyperactive, stream-of-consciousness splatter of snotty vocals, jangling guitars, and wiry irreverence that was as much a comedy skit as it was a punk parody." He considered it the quartet's "first enduring classic." AllMusic reviewer Ned Raggett says, "As left-field a fluke hit single as it gets, its mix of bad taste, rock star mockery, and stoner humor still works well." Daniel Brockman praises the song in a review for the website Vanyaland, dubbing it the "quintessential viral-before-there-was-such-a-thing underground of hit of its time." He places it in the context of its importance to teenagers of the decade:

Initially a slow-burning hit on college radio, it eventually found its way outside of collegiate ivory towers, becoming a shared secret for clued-in high schoolers and middle schoolers all over the country. [...] It was mean, it was pointless, it was mercifully short, and endlessly repeatable—for a certain segment of the population, quoting Dead Milkmen lyrics briefly supplanted quoting Monty Python sketches as a way to while away free periods during drudgerous school days."

== Personnel ==
Adapted from Big Lizard in My Backyard's liner notes.

The Dead Milkmen

- Joe Genaro – guitar, vocals, songwriting
- Rodney Linderman – vocals, songwriting
- Dean Sabatino – drums, percussion, songwriting
- Dave Schulthise – bass guitar, songwriting

Production

- Bob Dickie – production
- John Wicks – production
