= Pretty Music for Pretty People =

Studio album by the Dead Milkmen
- Released: October 7, 2014
- Genres: Punk rock, alternative rock
- Length: 51:25
- Label: Quid Ergo
- Producers: Brian McTear and Amy Morrissey

The Dead Milkmen chronology
| The King in Yellow (2011) | Pretty Music for Pretty People (2014) | Quaker City Quiet Pills (2023) |

Pretty Music for Pretty People is the tenth studio album by the Dead Milkmen, released in 2014. It is their second studio album since reuniting in 2008.

The album includes the four limited-release singles that followed 2011's The King in Yellow: ("Dark Clouds Gather Over Middlemarch", "Big Words Make the Baby Jesus Cry", "The Great Boston Molasses Flood", and "Welcome to Undertown"), and most of the b-sides from those singles, which first appeared in 2012 and 2013, in addition to previously unreleased songs.

It was released on CD on the Quid Ergo Records imprint, and digitally by the band on their website on October 7, 2014. A limited edition LP with the title Pretty Music For Pretty Special People was also released by Quid Ergo, containing only the previously unreleased songs, plus the "C-Sides" from the singles which had until then only been available digitally.

== Production ==
The album was recorded at Miner Street Studios, in Philadelphia, by Brian McTear and Amy Morrissey.

== Critical reception ==
Professional ratings
Review scores
| Source | Rating |
|---|---|
| Alternative Press | 4/5 stars |
| PopMatters | 8/10 |
| Punknews.org | 4.5/5 stars |

The Portland Mercury wrote: "Switching gears from hardcore to new wave to electro-inspired songs like the uncomfortably satirical 'Anthropology Days'—with lyrics inspired by various horrific and ridiculous forgotten factoids from history—they're still some of the greatest architects of observant punk rock."

== CD Track listing ==
1. "Pretty Music for Pretty People" - 3:48
2. "Big Words Make the Baby Jesus Cry" - 3:07
3. "Welcome to Undertown" - 3:43
4. "Now I Wanna Hold Your Dog" - 1:34
5. "Make It Witchy" - 2:50
6. "Mary Ann Cotton (The Poisoner's Song)" - 3:46
7. "I've Got to Get My Numbers Up" - 3:00
8. "Anthropology Days" - 3:11
9. "Somewhere Over Antarctica" - 4:11
10. "Dark Clouds Gather Over Middlemarch" - 3:12
11. "Streetlamps - Walking to Work" - 2:14
12. "The Sun Turns Our Patio into a Lifeless Hell" - 3:03
13. "The Great Boston Molasses Flood" - 3:54
14. "All You Need Is Nothing" - 3:08
15. "Ronald Reagan Killed the Black Dahlia" - 1:33
16. "Hipster Beard" - 3:50
17. "Sanitary Times" - 2:36

== LP Track listing ==
1. "Pretty Music for Pretty People" - 3:48
2. "Make It Witchy" - 2:50
3. "Mary Ann Cotton (The Poisoner's Song)" - 3:46
4. "I've Got to Get My Numbers Up" - 3:00
5. "Sanitary Times" - 2:36
6. "Anthropology Days" - 3:11
7. "The Sun Turns Our Patio into a Lifeless Hell" - 3:03
8. "All You Need Is Nothing" - 3:08
9. "Hipster Beard" - 3:50

== Personnel ==
The Dead Milkmen

- Rodney Anonymous – vocals, keyboards, tack piano
- Joe Jack Talcum – guitar, vocals, piano
- Dandrew Stevens – bass, tack piano, stylophone, synthesizer, vocals
- Dean Clean – drums, bells, sampler, vocals
