= Eat Your Paisley! =

Studio album by the Dead Milkmen
- Released: 1986
- Recorded: 1986
- Genres: Punk rock, alternative rock
- Length: 41:22
- Label: Restless
- Producers: Dave Reckner, the Dead Milkmen, John Wicks

The Dead Milkmen chronology
Big Lizard in My Backyard (1985)	Eat Your Paisley! (1986)	Bucky Fellini (1987)

Eat Your Paisley! is the second studio album by the Dead Milkmen, released on Restless Records in 1986.

"The Thing That Only Eats Hippies" and "Beach Party Vietnam" were included on the 1997 compilation Death Rides a Pale Cow: The Ultimate Collection; "Hippies" appeared on the 1998 compilation Cream of the Crop.

== Production ==
The album was produced by John Wicks, Dave Reckner, and the band. A video was shot for the single, "The Thing That Only Eats Hippies"; it was the band's first video.

In "The Thing That Only Eats Hippies", the band chides "Bob and Greg and Grant, you should beware," a reference to Hüsker Dü's Bob Mould, Greg Norton, and Grant Hart.

== Critical reception ==
Professional ratings
Review scores
Source	Rating
AllMusic	2.5/5 stars
Robert Christgau	B−
The Encyclopedia of Popular Music	3/5 stars
MusicHound Rock: The Essential Album Guide	3/5 stars

Trouser Press wrote that "the group’s wacky observations of stereotypes and artifacts are vague but astute; the music is expendable but never less than presentable." The Globe and Mail wrote that the band "play okay" but "sing execrably." People wrote that the band "produces rough, ragged rock ‘n’ roll with lyrics that express disdain for anything the adult world holds sacred and with music that purposefully negates the slickly produced synthesizer sounds of pretty boys such as Duran Duran and Howard Jones."

The Ottawa Citizen called the album "an intentionally tasteless, and occasionally funny, attack on the love generation of the '60s." The Philadelphia Inquirer called "the funny songs" funnier than the ones on the debut, and wrote that "the semi-serious songs evince a delirious surrealism that makes them truly powerful rock-and-roll." The Toronto Star deemed Eat Your Paisley! "nearly brilliant." The Chicago Tribune called it "more punky, brash, snotty and frequently funny rock."

== Track listing ==
All tracks by Dead Milkmen

1. "Where the Tarantula Lives" – 2:38
2. "Air Crash Museum" – 1:38
3. "KKSuck2" – 1:48
4. "Fifty Things" – 1:45
5. "Happy Is" – 2:27
6. "Beach Party Vietnam" – 1:45
7. "I Hear Your Name" – 2:31
8. "Two Feet Off the Ground" – 4:30
9. "The Thing That Only Eats Hippies" – 2:43
10. "Six Days" – 1:45
11. "Swampland of Desire" – 2:00
12. "Take Me Apart" – 2:07
13. "Earwig" – 2:48
14. "Moron" – 1:53
15. "The Fez" – 5:12
16. "Vince Lombardi Service Center" (CD bonus track) – 2:41

== Personnel ==
- Rodney Anonymous Melloncamp – vocals
- Dave Blood – bass
- Dean Clean – drums
- Dave Reckner – producer
- Joe Jack Talcum – guitar, vocals
- John Wicks – producer
