= Punk Rock Girl =

Song by the Dead Milkmen

Single by the Dead Milkmen

from the album Beelzebubba
- B-side: "Ringo Buys a Rifle"; "Life Is Shit"; "Dizzy in the Daylight"
- Released: December 1988
- Recorded: 1988
- Studio: Arlyn Studios (Austin, Texas)
- Genre: Pop punk; comedy rock
- Length: 2:40
- Label: Enigma
- Songwriters: Joseph Genaro; Dave Schulthise; Rodney Linderman; Dean Sabatino
- Producers: Brian Beattie; Mike Stewart

The Dead Milkmen singles chronology
"Instant Club Hit (You'll Dance to Anything)" (1987)	"Punk Rock Girl" (1988)	"Smokin' Banana Peels" (1988)

"Punk Rock Girl" is a song by American rock band the Dead Milkmen. It was the first single released from the band's fourth album Beelzebubba (1988). Released in December 1988, the track was primarily composed by guitarist and vocalist Joe Genaro and bassist Dave Schulthise, though it is credited to all four band members. The idea behind the song was to create a punk rock nursery rhyme; as such, it is a simple love song, written from the perspective of a sheltered boy dreaming of a rowdy, delinquent girlfriend. Lyrically, it depicts the duo bonding over record-shopping and eating pizza.

The song was recorded with producer Brian Beattie in Austin, Texas. In addition to the band's normal lineup, the song also incorporates an accordion. Beattie hoped to emulate the quality of the quartet's original demo, by ensuring the guitar solo seemed stifled or imperfect. "Punk Rock Girl" makes several pop culture references, from comedian Minnie Pearl to musicians Mojo Nixon and the Beach Boys. It mentions several locations in the band's hometown of Philadelphia, including the counter-culture shop Zipperhead.

The track was the group's biggest commercial hit; it peaked at number 11 on Billboard's Modern Rock Tracks chart, the band's only such entry on the charts. Its music video was a surprise success when it was picked up by MTV, where it became a staple of the era. The song has been considered one of the first pop punk hits, as well as a breakthrough for the comedy rock genre. "Punk Rock Girl" remains the band's best-known song, and has been covered by numerous artists and licensed for a variety of media.

== Background ==
"Punk Rock Girl" was written several years prior to its recording, primarily by Genaro and Schulthise. Genaro had just graduated from Temple University and was working in its library when a musician friend spoke about wanting to write a punk rock-inflected nursery rhyme. Using this as his basis melodically, Genaro wrote much of the song but stalled when running out of words that rhymed with "girl". He enlisted the assistance of Schulthise, who contributed a reference to comedian Minnie Pearl, as well as the word "beau". The two were uncertain it would fit within the Dead Milkmen's catalogue, and took to performing it within a side project they called Ornamental Wigwam. They received positive responses from audiences, who suggested they share it with their main band, though it took them several years to do so.

== Composition ==
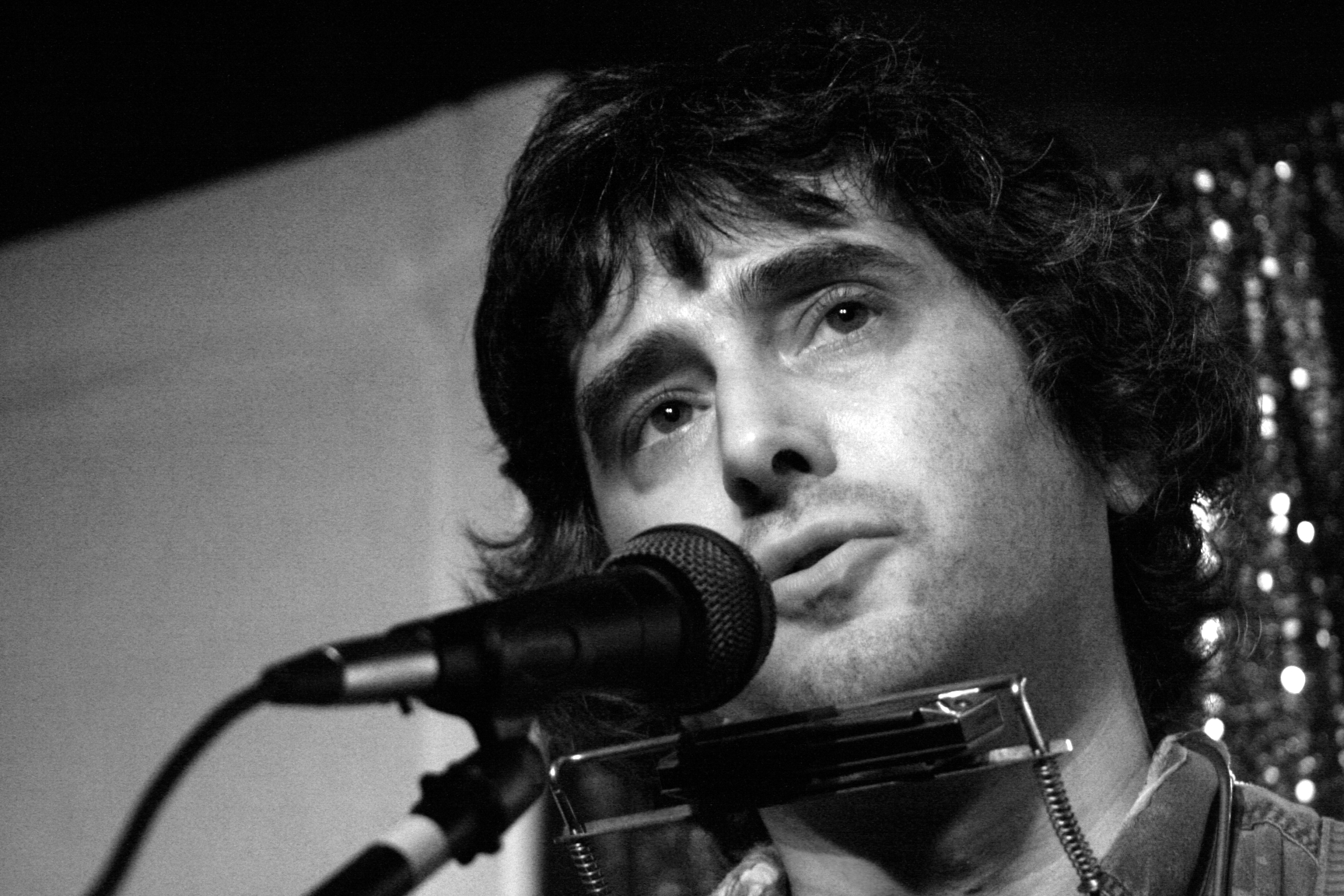
The song was written by guitarist/vocalist Joseph Genaro (pictured) and bassist Dave Schulthise.

"Punk Rock Girl" has alternately been described as a pop punk and comedy rock song. The story of the song is penned from the perspective of a character who is not interested in punk rock music, only a punk rock girlfriend. Genaro describes the protagonist as a "middle of the road" kid who just wants to "walk on the wild side". In the song, the narrator meets the titular girl one Saturday evening, and launches "into a series of boredom-avoiding, punk-themed adventures with her". The song references several locations from the band's hometown of Philadelphia: the couple meet at Zipperhead, a legendary counterculture clothing store in the city. From there, they venture to the Philadelphia Pizza Company, a real-life pizza shop open at the time of the song's release. When the waitress explains they only serve iced tea over hot tea, the duo hop onto the table and rebel, crying out "anarchy". Steve Huey of AllMusic observes that Genaro's vocals are often "spoken-more-than-sung, stream-of-consciousness lyrical rants".

The song also makes reference to psychobilly musician Mojo Nixon, whose albums the couple search for a record store, to no avail. It also mentions the rock band the Beach Boys. Their cover of "California Dreamin'", which the song references, was released in 1986. Genaro's concept was that the protagonist of the song–a sheltered, conservative kid–might not know the original version and mistake the Beach Boys' cover for the original. As the song progresses, the listener discovers the punk-rock girlfriend drives a stolen car and may possibly be the daughter of the vice president of the United States. The song concludes with the quartet finding increasingly creative ways to rhyme words with "girl", including "Duke of Earl", "Minnie Pearl", and "fudge banana swirl".

== Recording and production ==
Eventually, the song was recorded for the band's fourth album, Beelzebubba (1988). It was produced by friend Brian Beattie, and recorded at Arlyn Studios in Austin, Texas. The group had forged a friendship with the producer over the years, having hosted each other when performing in the band's hometown of Philadelphia, and in Texas, where Beattie resided. They had previously worked with the producer on their last album, Bucky Fellini (1987). The album was recorded over the period of a month, during which the group rented a home with a pool, which made them "[feel] like rock stars." The album was largely recorded live in the studio's main tracking room, with vocals overdubbed in one week later. Mike Stewart engineered the sessions, and was credited as the album's co-producer.

Beattie suggested incorporating an accordion in the song, and lent Genaro one to learn how to use over the course of a weekend. He only improved at the instrument enough to play the melody with his right hand, and Beattie overdubbed the left-handed part himself. The final piece of recording was double-tracking the full-band chorus at the song's conclusion. Beattie found the effect amusing, comparing it to the Sherman Brothers' song "It's a Small World". For Genaro's guitar solo, Beattie attempted to capture Genaro's original demo track, which was poorly recorded. To achieve an imperfect sound, Beattie pushed the compression on the mix using a 1176 Peak Limiter.

== Music video ==
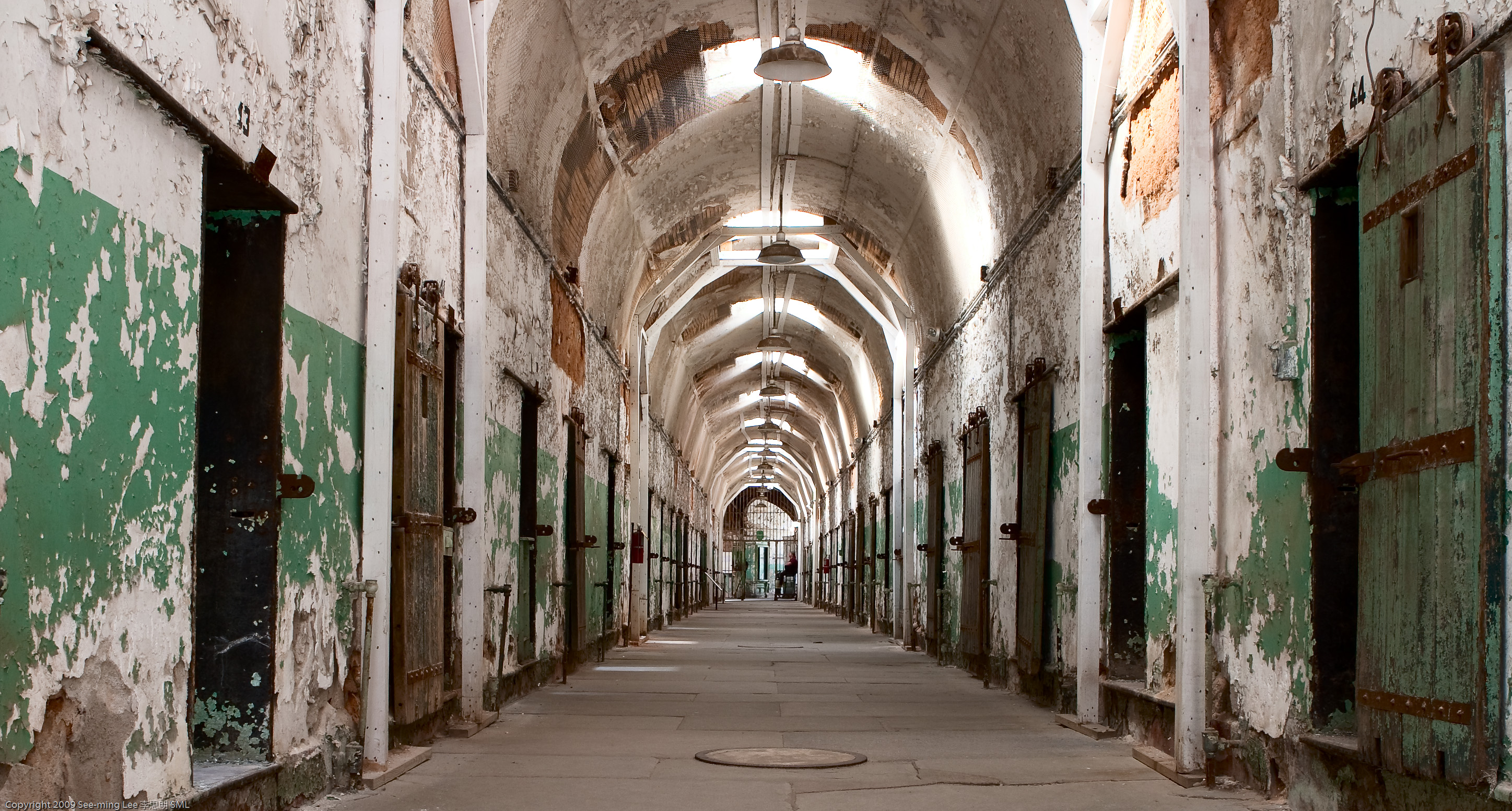
The music video was partially filmed at Eastern State Penitentiary, an abandoned prison seen here in 2009.

The "gritty" and "low-budget" music video was partially filmed at the abandoned Eastern State Penitentiary in Philadelphia. Parts of the video were filmed at Zipperhead, "a popular counterculture store on Philly's South Street" which is mentioned in the song. The video features several shots of a Nagra IV-S reel-to-reel tape deck, including the opening sequence of a closeup of the deck being switched to play, a wide shot of the band waiting for the music to begin, and a closeup of the deck's level meter jumping as the song starts. It was directed by Adam Bernstein.

The video was first added to MTV's rotation the week it reached its peak position on the Billboard charts; peaking at number one on the channel's Dial MTV request list. Several years later, the song saw a resurgence in popularity when it was featured in a segment of MTV's animated series Beavis and Butt-Head, in which the titular duo criticized the band's lax attitude and numerous mistakes and Butt-Head noted on seeing the video's conclusion where the eponymous woman and a band member steal a man's car and drive away "a real punk rock girl would eat this guy alive". MTV included the video among its annual yearbook of videos from 1988 on its website, calling it among the "biggest, best, most memorable music videos".

== Commercial performance and reception ==
"Punk Rock Girl" was first issued as a 7" single in the U.S. by Engima in December 1988. It debuted on Billboard's Modern Rock Tracks chart on January 7, 1989, at position 27; it spent ten weeks on the chart, peaking at number 11 on February 4, 1989. It was issued as a single in the UK with cover art, illustrated by artist Melissa Bell, on February 13, 1989. To promote the single, the band guested on Club MTV with host Downtown Julie Brown, a show typically relegated for dance artists. The channel demanded the quartet lip-sync their taped performance, and to agree, the band got MTV to agree to some conditions: a tuba for Linderman, an oversized drum kit that Sabatino ends up playing little of, and more. The band viewed the opportunity as a joke, and still found it "hilarious" years later.

Jason Heller wrote about the song in a 2012 piece for The A.V. Club examining classic singles. He called it "a classic pop song: well crafted, well played, well produced, and impeccably infectious." Heller praised the tune as "rife with smart, subversive flourishes: The asthmatic accordion. Genaro's strangulated un-solo. And some sly, mischievous runs from founding bassist Dave "Blood" Schulthise." AllMusic's Ned Raggett, reviewing Beelzebubba, singled out the song for praise, calling it "near-perfect" and commenting, "Sprightly and catchy, it mixes the unexpectedly tender, sweet side of the band with the usual drawling humor." The song has been covered by MxPx, Ben Gibbard, Diesel Boy, and Streetlight Manifesto.

The song was licensed as featured music in the video game Tony Hawk's Project 8 (2006), and used on the Fox television show Raising Hope.

== Legacy ==
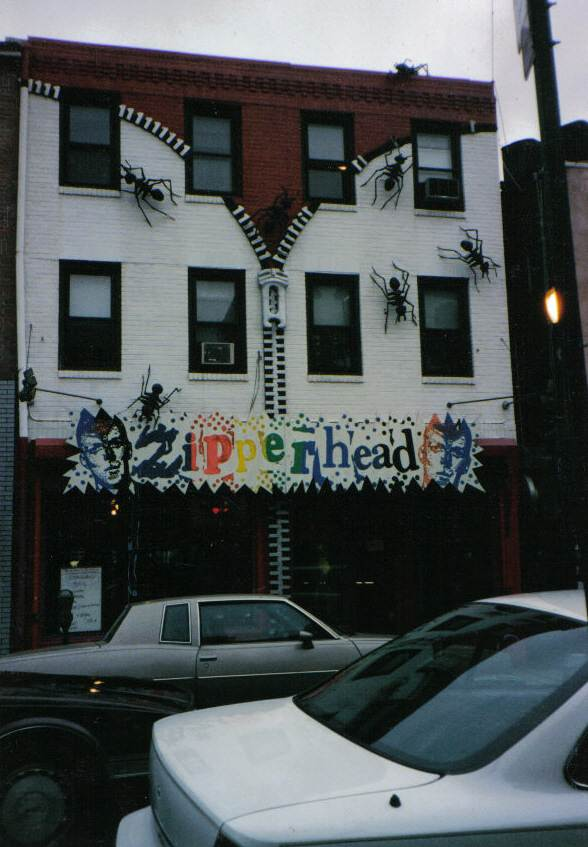
Zipperhead, the iconic punk clothing shop in Philadelphia's South Street district referenced in the song

"Punk Rock Girl" was one of the first punk rock crossover hits, and balances between the genre's early days and its poppier, more mainstream interpretation. The Dead Milkmen were among the first artists to gain attention playing this more melodic strain of punk, like fellow genre pioneers NOFX and Green Day. However, Genaro declined to be considered part of the "pop punk" scene; in a 2015 interview, he stated he "[doesn't] really think that we fit into that genre. I don't know what genre that we fit into". The band's impact on later musicians, specifically through the wide popularity of "Punk Rock Girl", is evident. MXPX covered the song in 2009 on their album On the Cover II. Tom DeLonge, guitarist for Blink-182, recalls that his first concert was the Dead Milkmen and mentions "Punk Rock Girl" fondly in an interview with Rolling Stone in 2019. Steve Huey of AllMusic writes that the single was "one of the first comedy rock songs from the alternative world to break through to a wider audience; in that sense, it prefigured the post-grunge breakthrough of a wave of quirky collegiate comedy bands".

For the Milkmen, this newfound spotlight was fleeting and not to their liking. The label pushed Genaro to write more songs to feature his solo vocals, to capitalize on the success of the single, but the group refused. Their follow-up album, Metaphysical Graffiti (1990), received a divided response from fans and critics, and stalled the band's momentum. After the band broke up in 1995, the band members got day jobs but continued to occasionally pursue music part-time. Since 2008, the Milkmen have recorded two new albums and have continued to tour; "Punk Rock Girl" remains the band's best-known song.

The song is also the namesake and title track of a stage musical by Joe Iconis, which had been in development in 2018 and 2019. It premiered on-stage at the Argyle Theatre in Long Island, New York during January 22 through February 27, 2022.

== Formats and track listing ==
U.S. 7" (1988)

1. "Punk Rock Girl" – 2:35
2. "Dizzy in the Daylight" – 2:37

U.S. Promo CD (1988)

1. "Punk Rock Girl" – 2:35

U.S. cassette maxi single (1988)

1. "Punk Rock Girl" – 2:35
2. "Ringo Buys a Rifle" – 2:16
3. "Dizzy in the Daylight" – 2:37

U.K. 7" (1989)

1. "Punk Rock Girl" – 2:35
2. "Ringo Buys a Rifle" – 2:16

U.K. 12" (1989)

1. "Punk Rock Girl" – 2:35
2. "Ringo Buys a Rifle" – 2:16
3. "Life Is Shit" – 3:15

Australian 7" (1989)

1. "Punk Rock Girl" – 2:35
2. "Dizzy in the Daylight" – 2:37

== Personnel ==
Adapted from Beelzebubba's liner notes.

The Dead Milkmen

- Joe Genaro – guitar, vocals, keyboards, accordion, songwriting
- Rodney Linderman – vocals, keyboards, songwriting
- Dean Sabatino – drums, percussion, vocals, songwriting
- Dave Schulthise – bass guitar, vocals, songwriting

Production

- Brian Beattie – production
- Mike Stewart – production, recording engineer
- Melissa Bell – single cover illustration

== Charts ==
Chart (1989)	Peak position
U.S. Modern Rock Tracks (Billboard)	11
