= Bucky Fellini =

Studio album by Dead Milkmen
- Released: July 1987
- Recorded: 1987
- Genre: Punk, comedy rock
- Length: 38:26
- Label: Enigma
- Producer: Brian "Mud Lounge" Beattie

Dead Milkmen chronology
Eat Your Paisley! (1986)	Bucky Fellini (1987)	Beelzebubba (1988)

Bucky Fellini is the third studio album by The Dead Milkmen. It was released in 1987 by Enigma. The album peaked at No. 163 on the Billboard 200.

The album produced one single, "Instant Club Hit (You'll Dance to Anything)". An EP was released containing the single and multiple remixes, as well as previously unreleased tracks. That track and two others from Bucky Fellini appeared on the 1997 compilation Death Rides a Pale Cow: The Ultimate Collection; two were included on the 1998 compilation Cream of the Crop.

"I Am the Walrus" is not a cover version of the Beatles song. "Watching Scotty Die" was covered by Mischief Brew in 2008 on their split with the Milkmen's Joe Jack Talcum.

== Production ==
The album was produced by Brian "Mud Lounge" Beattie. It contains a cover of Daniel Johnston's "Rocketship".

== Critical reception ==
Professional ratings
Review scores
Source	Rating
AllMusic	4.5/5 stars
Robert Christgau	B+
The Encyclopedia of Popular Music	2/5 stars
MusicHound Rock: The Essential Album Guide	3/5 stars

Trouser Press wrote that "the relatively expansive Bucky Fellini — with guest musicians, improved songwriting and such dementedly parodic cultural concepts as 'Nitro Burning Funny Cars', 'Going to Graceland', '(Theme from) Blood Orgy of the Atomic Fern' — coughed up the clever 'Instant Club Hit (You'll Dance to Anything)'." The Chicago Tribune wrote that the album "weaves touches of country and surf music into a brand of rock that is heavily influenced by punk but is less intense than the usual hammering hard-core assault." The Orlando Sentinel wrote: "Unfortunately, a comic bent leads to the labeling of bands as novelty acts, a commercial death trap. On Bucky Fellini, the Dead Milkmen avoid the trap, expanding their basic sound with touches of violin, lap steel guitar and dobro."

People thought that "the Dead Milkmen aren't as stupid as they'd like to be ... Now they sound as if they might know how to play their guitars, and they produce some on-target commentary such as 'Instant Club Hit (You'll Dance to Anything)'." The Washington Post opined that "though musically fuller and more diverse than the band's two previous albums, two sides of Bucky Fellini may be more youthful cynicism than most people would want to sit through in one listening." The Toronto Star deemed the album "a sarcastic masterpiece that takes the mickey out of a dozen cherished American icons."

== Track listing ==
All songs written by the Dead Milkmen unless otherwise noted:

1. "The Pit" - 2:19
2. "Take Me to the Specialist" - 2:17
3. "I Am the Walrus" - 2:02
4. "Watching Scotty Die" - 2:43
5. "Going to Graceland" - 2:35
6. "Big Time Operator" (Duane Houser, J.D. Miller) - 2:53
7. "Instant Club Hit (You'll Dance to Anything)" - 3:37
8. "The Badger Song" - 2:18
9. "Tacoland" - 1:35
10. "City of Mud" - 1:58
11. "Rocketship" (Daniel Johnston) - 2:48
12. "Nitro Burning Funny Cars" - 2:45
13. "Surfin' Cow" - 3:34
14. "(Theme From) Blood Orgy of the Atomic Fern" - 2:18
15. "Jellyfish Heaven" - 2:10
16. (untitled instrumental) - 0:34 [Hidden Track]

== Musicians ==
The Dead Milkmen

- Dave Schulthise (Dave Blood) – bass, percussion, backing vocals, sampler
- Rodney Linderman (Rodney Anonymous) – vocals, guitar
- Joseph Genaro (Joe Jack Talcum) – guitar, vocals, whistling tube of plastic, piano, Dobro, sampler
- Dean Sabatino (Dean Clean) – drums, percussion, backing vocals, drum machine, sampler

Additional sounds

- Brian Beattie – lap steel, percussion, backing vocals
- K. McCarty – violin, backing vocals
- Dave Cameron – percussion
- David Reckner – power saw, backing vocals
- Lee Woulfe – sample source
- Sheri Lane – backing vocals
- Kim Cook – backing vocals
- Dan Mapp – backing vocals
