= Empty Stares =

- Empty Stares promo photo taken in 1994. L to R: Kevin, Ted, NottingCognito, Tom, Randy

Background information
- Origin: Philadelphia, Pennsylvania, U.S.
- Genres: Alternative rock
- Years active: 1992–1997
- Members: NottingCognito; Randy; Ted; Tom; Kevin
- Website: www.emptystares.com

Empty Stares was an alternative rock band from Philadelphia, Pennsylvania, U.S. that was formed in 1992 and ended in 1997. In those five years, Empty Stares made a serious impact on the Philadelphia music scene. ES was composed of NottingCognito (vocals), Randy (bass), Ted (guitar), Tom (guitar) and Kevin (drums). The band was formed as Point Blank in 1988 by blue-collar friends Ted, NottingCognito & Kevin changing their name to Empty Stares with the addition of Randy and Tom soon after meeting in 1990 at Cardinal Dougherty High School located in Philadelphia, Pennsylvania. The self-financed "To One His Own" was released in 1992, but after graduating in 1993, and a reworking of their sound, they were signed to Shangri-la Records.

Their dynamic of melodic alternative rock that occasionally expanded into full-blown trance nu-metal mode, complete with lyrics that strike a grim tone on life, was evident on the highly successful Shangri-la Records Release "for...", where spiritual overtones were also present. This earned Empty Stares a management contract with Buzz Trip and a booking contract with Bay Ridge Talent, New York City and extensive touring with the likes of Anthrax, Clutch, The Misfits, Life of Agony, Type O Negative and Gwar. No less intense was 1997's "Rain", produced, by Joe Campbell of MudWax Records which appeared on the nationally released "Horse Nation: A tribute to the life, music and spirit of The Cult." One of their last songs written "Changes", addressed the changes they were going through, and allowed the band to expand their musical direction. The band's unexpected success continued into 1996 when "for..." was certified as selling 10,000 copies in the United States. The band were also produced by two significant leaders of the Philadelphia punk culture, Rodney Anonymous & Joe Jack Talcum of The Dead Milkmen. Rodney & Joe assisted and performed on a four song demo for Empty Stares that was never officially released. By 1997, the band was due a much needed break and have remained on hiatus ever since.

The "for..." EP was released to all digital music streaming platforms on June 9th, 2026.

== Discography ==
=== Full-length studio albums ===
- To One His Own – 1992
- for... – 1994

=== Compilation albums ===
- Horse Nation: A Tribute to the Life, Music, and Spirit of The Cult – 1997

=== Other releases ===
- The Dead Milkmen Sessions – 1997, demo
