= Death Rides a Pale Cow (The Ultimate Collection) =

Greatest hits album by the Dead Milkmen
- Released: 1997
- Genre: Punk
- Label: Restless

The Dead Milkmen chronology
Stoney's Extra Stout (Pig) (1995)	Death Rides a Pale Cow (1997)	The King in Yellow (2011)

Death Rides a Pale Cow is a greatest hits album by the punk rock band the Dead Milkmen, released in 1997.

== Release ==
The compilation contains two previously unreleased songs: "Milkmen Stomp" and "Labor Day". The band was unable to include tracks from Soul Rotation and Not Richard, But Dick, as Hollywood Records still retained the rights. It takes its name from an early cassette-only release.

== Critical reception ==
Professional ratings
Review scores
Source	Rating
AllMusic	4.5/5 stars
The Encyclopedia of Popular Music	4/5 stars
MusicHound Rock: The Essential Album Guide	3/5 stars
The Plain Dealer	B

The A.V. Club wrote: "Not surprisingly, the album's best moments arrive fairly early in the proceedings, with such banner moments as 'Bitchin' Camaro', 'Beach Party Vietnam' and 'Instant Club Hit' serving to remind fans what was so great about the band in the first place. Latter-day cult hits ('Punk Rock Girl', 'Smokin' Banana Peels') are briskly appealing, but Dead Milkmen was at its best when it was at its smallest and, by extension, meanest. By the end, its bratty edge was dulled to an unfortunate degree, but nearly all of its best moments are on this worthwhile collection." The Columbus Dispatch wrote that "nothing or no one escapes the Milkmen's savage wit."

Entertainment Weekly included the compilation on its list of "Great American Novelties".

== Track listing ==
1. "Milkmen Stomp" (The Meatmen cover) ^{a}
2. "Tiny Town"^{b}
3. "Big Lizard"^{b}
4. "Bitchin' Camaro"^{b}
5. "Nutrition"^{b}
6. "Dean's Dream"^{b}
7. "Beach Party Vietnam"^{c}
8. "The Thing That Only Eats Hippies"^{c}
9. "Big Time Operator"^{d}
10. "Instant Club Hit"^{d}
11. "Surfin' Cow"^{d}
12. "Labor Day"^{a}
13. "I Walk the Thinnest Line"^{e}
14. "Stuart"^{e}
15. "Punk Rock Girl"^{e}
16. "Smokin' Banana Peels"^{e}
17. "Life Is Shit"^{e}
18. "Do the Brown Nose"^{f}
19. "If You Love Someone Set Them on Fire"^{f}
20. "Peter Bazooka"^{g}
21. "The Girl With the Strong Arm"^{g}
22. "Big Deal"^{g}
23. "The Blues Song"^{g}
- ^a Tracks 1 and 12 are previously unreleased
- ^b Tracks 2–6 appeared on the 1985 album Big Lizard In My Backyard
- ^c Tracks 7 and 8 appeared on the 1986 album Eat Your Paisley
- ^d Tracks 9–11 appeared on the 1987 album Bucky Fellini
- ^e Tracks 13–17 appeared on the 1988 album Beelzebubba
- ^f Tracks 18 and 19 appeared on the 1990 album Metaphysical Graffiti
- ^g Tracks 20–23 appeared on the 1995 album Stoney's Extra Stout (Pig)
