= Stoney's Extra Stout (Pig) =

Studio album by the Dead Milkmen
- Released: October 24, 1995
- Genre: Punk rock, alternative rock
- Length: 43:50
- Label: Restless

The Dead Milkmen chronology
Chaos Rules: Live at the Trocadero (1994)	Stoney's Extra Stout (Pig) (1995)	Death Rides a Pale Cow (The Ultimate Collection) (1997)

Stoney's Extra Stout (Pig) is the eighth studio album by the Dead Milkmen. It was released by Restless Records in 1995. The Dead Milkmen had decided to break up prior to its release; the band (minus deceased bass player Dave Schulthise) would not record again until 2011's The King in Yellow.

Several songs made it onto Death Rides a Pale Cow (A Collection), a greatest hits release from the band.

== Critical reception ==
Professional ratings
Review scores
Source	Rating
AllMusic	1.5/5 stars
The Encyclopedia of Popular Music	2/5 stars
MusicHound Rock: The Essential Album Guide	1/5 stars
Vancouver Sun	1/4 stars

Trouser Press wrote: "Typical of the uninspired banality, the final track, 'Big Deal', opens with 'Life sucks then you die / And your soul gets sucked into the sky.' Meanwhile, your records go to the cutout bins." The A.V. Club called the album "justly forgotten."

== Track listing ==
1. "Peter Bazooka" – 3:07
2. "Train I Ride" – 2:48
3. "The Girl with the Strong Arm" – 2:51
4. "I’m Flying Away" – 2:49
5. "Helicopter Interiors" – 1:44
6. "The Blues Song" – 4:02
7. "The Man Who Rides the Bus" – 3:32
8. "Don’t Deny Your Inner Child" – 2:06
9. "When I Get to Heaven" – 2:40
10. "I Can’t Stay Awake" – 2:21
11. "Crystalline" – 3:29
12. "Chaos Theory" – 2:52
13. "Khrissy" – 3:38
14. "Like to Be Alone" – 2:44
15. "Big Deal" – 3:07
