= The King in Yellow (album) =

Studio album by the Dead Milkmen
- Released: March 19, 2011
- Recorded: November–December 2010
- Genre: Punk rock, alternative rock
- Length: 43:28
- Label: Self-released

The Dead Milkmen chronology
Death Rides a Pale Cow (The Ultimate Collection) (1997)	The King in Yellow (2011)	Pretty Music for Pretty People (2014)

The King in Yellow is the ninth studio album by the Dead Milkmen. It was their first studio album in 16 years. It was released digitally on the band's website in 2011; a CD release followed shortly thereafter.

== Production ==
The band started working on new material after their reunion in 2008. The album was recorded in two weekend sessions in November and December 2010 at South Street Sounds and Miner Street Studios. In February 2011, the album was mixed at Miner Street Studios by Brian McTear.

== Critical reception ==
Professional ratings
Review scores
Source	Rating
The A.V. Club	C+

The Chicago Reader wrote: "Their jangled guitars, their bitingly witty lyrics, their snotty Philly accents, their playful and iconoclastic version of hardcore—a reminder of a time when it actually had a sense of humor—make it clear what you've been missing in the years since."

== Track listing ==
1. "The King in Yellow / William Bloat" - 3:48
2. "Fauxhemia" - 2:41
3. "She's Affected" - 2:02
4. "Caitlin Childs" - 3:33
5. "Meaningless Upbeat Happy Song" - 1:18
6. "Hangman" - 2:20
7. "Cold Hard Ground" - 3:22
8. "Some Young Guy" - 1:44
9. "Or Maybe It Is" - 1:30
10. "Passport to Depravity" - 2:13
11. "Quality of Death" - 2:18
12. "Buried in the Sky" - 2:36
13. "13th Century Boy" - 1:57
14. "Commodify Your Dissent" - 2:51
15. "Can't Relax" - 2:54
16. "Melora Says" - 2:28
17. "Solvents (For Home and Industry)" - 3:53

== Personnel ==
- Joe Genaro – guitar, vocals
- Rodney Linderman – vocals, keyboards
- Dean Sabatino – drums
- Dan Stevens – bass
