= Metaphysical Graffiti =

Studio album by the Dead Milkmen
- Released: 1990
- Recorded: February 1989 – January 1990
- Genre: Punk rock, comedy rock
- Length: 52:09
- Label: Enigma
- Producer: Brian "Bongwizard" Beattie

The Dead Milkmen chronology
Beelzebubba (1988)	Metaphysical Graffiti (1990)	Soul Rotation (1992)

Metaphysical Graffiti is the fifth studio album by the Dead Milkmen, released by Enigma Records in 1990. The album title and cover art, the latter designed by the band's drummer Dean Clean, parody the 1975 album Physical Graffiti by Led Zeppelin. Two tracks ("Do the Brown Nose" and "If You Love Somebody, Set Them on Fire") appear on Death Rides a Pale Cow.

The album peaked at No. 164 on the Billboard 200.

== Production ==
Like Bucky Fellini and Beelzebubba, Metaphysical Graffiti was recorded in Austin, Texas, and was produced by Brian Beattie. Gibby Haynes, of Butthole Surfers, appears on "Anderson, Walkman, Buttholes and How!"

The video for "Methodist Coloring Book" had to be reedited before MTV would agree to play it, due to imagery the network was worried may be offensive. Enigma printed and mailed coloring books to promote the track.

== Critical reception ==
Professional ratings
Review scores
Source	Rating
AllMusic	2/5 stars
Chicago Tribune	2/4 stars
The Encyclopedia of Popular Music	2/5 stars
MusicHound Rock: The Essential Album Guide	3/5 stars
Ottawa Citizen	2/5 stars
Select	3/5

People wrote: "When the Milkmen played their first punk parodies in the mid-1980s, they sounded appropriately fresh. Now they sometimes seem to be as dated as the music they ridicule." The Chicago Tribune deemed the album "more screaming, more production and less melody." The Ottawa Citizen called it "funny, loud, fast and violent."

The Los Angeles Times wrote that "parody is in safe hands with the Dead Milkmen." The Colorado Springs Gazette-Telegraph called Metaphysical Graffiti "a savagely sarcastic collection of commentaries on greed and religion." The Washington Post thought that "Milkmen albums usually turn on the existence of a single standout tune-'Bitchin' Camaro', for example, or 'Punk Rock Girl'-and this outing doesn't seem to have one."

== Track listing ==
All songs written by the Dead Milkmen

1. "Beige Sunshine" – 3:37
2. "Do the Brown Nose" – 4:41
3. "Methodist Coloring Book" – 2:38
4. "Part 3" – 2:20
5. "I Tripped Over the Ottoman" – 3:05
6. "The Big Sleazy" – 4:08
7. "If You Love Somebody, Set Them on Fire" – 2:01
8. "Dollar Signs in Her Eyes" – 3:37
9. "In Praise of Sha Na Na" – 3:25
10. "Epic Tales of Adventure" – 2:55
11. "I Hate You, I Love You" – 1:58
12. "Now Everybody’s Me" – 3:55
13. "Little Man in My Head" – 3:48
14. "Anderson, Walkman, Buttholes and How!" – 3:25
15. "Cousin Earl" – 6:36
