= Beelzebubba =

Album by the Dead Milkmen

Studio album by the Dead Milkmen
- Released: 1988
- Genres: Punk rock; comedy rock; cowpunk
- Length: 45:29
- Label: Enigma
- Producers: Brian Beattie, Mike Stewart

The Dead Milkmen chronology
Bucky Fellini (1987)	Beelzebubba (1988)	Metaphysical Graffiti (1990)

Beelzebubba is the fourth studio album by the American satirical punk rock band the Dead Milkmen, released in 1988. It peaked at No. 101 on the Billboard 200. The album contains perhaps the band's best-known song, "Punk Rock Girl".

Five tracks from Beelzebubba ("I Walk the Thinnest Line", "Stuart", "Punk Rock Girl", "Smokin' Banana Peels", and "Life Is Shit") are included on the band's 1997 compilation album Death Rides a Pale Cow: The Ultimate Collection.

== Overview ==
Beelzebubba was recorded in Austin, Texas, and was produced by Mike Stewart and Brian "Orchid Breath" Beattie. The cover photo is of Rodney Linderman's father, also named Rodney.

The album includes the song "Punk Rock Girl", which was released as a single. The song debuted on Billboard's Modern Rock Tracks chart on January 7, 1989, at position 27; it spent ten weeks on the chart, peaking at number 11 on February 4, 1989. The video was filmed in part at Eastern State Penitentiary.

The track "Stuart" features Dead Milkmen vocalist Rodney Linderman speaking rather than singing; the song is presented in the form of Linderman rambling to an apparent man named Stuart in a trailer park about what "the queers are doing to the soil", which he claims is related to building "landing strips for gay Martians".

In 1989, the Dead Milkmen released the Smokin' Banana Peels EP, which contains remixes of the song "Smokin' Banana Peels". It also contains several previously unreleased songs.

== Critical reception ==
Professional ratings
Review scores
Source	Rating
AllMusic	4/5 stars
Chicago Tribune	1.5/4 stars
Robert Christgau	B+
The Encyclopedia of Popular Music	3/5 stars
MusicHound Rock: The Essential Album Guide	3/5 stars
The Philadelphia Inquirer	2/4 stars

The Washington Post's Mark Jenkins wrote that "it's 'Punk Rock Girl', the only song that shows some vulnerability amidst all the attitude, that redeems the record." Trouser Press thought that "the Milkmen's skimpy charms run very thin on Beelzebubba, an album with precisely three assets: a great title, amusing artwork and the catchy but dumb 'Punk Rock Girl'." The staff of People wrote: "You won't find the Dead Milkmen beating any dead horses. They just tickle one and move on to their next victim."

James Muretich of the Calgary Herald wrote that the album "rides a sound of manic, minimalist rock that leaves behind such hit-and-run victims as homophobic trailer park residents, bleach boys (people with strange drinking habits) and PBS." Tom Barrett of the Vancouver Sun called Beelzebubba the band's best album and "a flying drop kick of a disc that pokes savage fun at hippies, frat boys, Bob Hope and homophobes."

In a retrospective article, Nicholas Pell of LA Weekly called the album "a bona fide rock & roll masterpiece" and "nothing short of the White Album of its day."

== Track listing ==
All tracks are written by the Dead Milkmen.

No.	Title	Length
1.	"Brat in the Frat"	1:06
2.	"Rc's Mom"	2:27
3.	"Stuart"	2:22
4.	"I Walk the Thinnest Line"	2:11
5.	"Sri Lanka Sex Hotel"	3:41
6.	"Bad Party"	1:53
7.	"Punk Rock Girl"	2:40
8.	"Bleach Boys"	3:49
9.	"My Many Smells"	2:21
10.	"Smokin' Banana Peels"	3:49
11.	"The Guitar Song"	3:31
12.	"Born to Love Volcanos"	3:13
13.	"Everybody's Got Nice Stuff But Me"	2:51
14.	"I Against Osbourne"	1:56
15.	"Howard Beware"	2:30
16.	"Ringo Buys a Rifle"	2:21
17.	"Life Is Shit"	3:19
Total length:		45:29
