= Big Lizard in My Backyard =

Album by the Dead Milkmen

Studio album by the Dead Milkmen
- Released: 1985
- Recorded: 1985
- Genres: Punk rock; comedy rock; alternative rock
- Length: 42:14
- Label: Restless
- Producers: The Dead Milkmen, John Wicks

The Dead Milkmen chronology
| Big Lizard in My Backyard (1985) | Eat Your Paisley! (1986) |

Big Lizard in My Backyard is the debut album by the Dead Milkmen, released by Restless Records in 1985.

Although the album yielded no singles, it achieved enough notoriety to create a fan base for the band. Five of the album's tracks appear on the 1997 compilation Death Rides a Pale Cow: The Ultimate Collection; four tracks appear on the 1998 compilation Cream of the Crop.

== Production ==
Big Lizard in My Backyard was produced by John Wicks and the band. The introduction to "Bitchin' Camaro" was improvised.

== Cover artwork ==
The album's cover artwork was designed by the band's drummer, Dean Clean.

== Critical reception ==
Professional ratings
Review scores
| Source | Rating |
|---|---|
| AllMusic | 4.5/5 stars |
| Robert Christgau | A− |
| The Encyclopedia of Popular Music | 3/5 stars |
| MusicHound Rock: The Essential Album Guide | 3/5 stars |

Big Lizard in My Backyard received strong reviews, with critics singling out "Bitchin' Camaro", calling it "hilarious" and "career-making." Maximum Rocknroll wrote that "these 20 satire-laced songs are real crack-ups, and backed up by tight playing that incorporates funk, country, and lots of other styles into their punk approach." Spin called the album "frenetic goof pop," writing that it's "full of the kind of scruff-and-tumble guitar and funtime lyrics that made 1977 punk such a refreshing blast."

== Track listing ==
All tracks written by the Dead Milkmen

1. "Tiny Town" - 1:45
2. "Beach Song" - 2:00
3. "Plum Dumb" - 1:56
4. "Swordfish" - 1:31
5. "V.F.W." - 1:48
6. "Rastabilly" - 1:07
7. "Serrated Edge" - 1:59
8. "Lucky" - 2:10
9. "Big Lizard" - 1:59
10. "Gorilla Girl" - 1:33
11. "Bitchin' Camaro" - 3:01
12. "Filet of Sole" - 1:57
13. "Spit Sink" - 2:01 (Produced By Mike Ace & Jonny Earthshoe)
14. "Violent School" - 1:58
15. "Takin’ Retards to the Zoo" - 0:48 (Produced By Mike Ace & Jonny Earthshoe)
16. "Junkie" - 0:52
17. "Right Wing Pigeons" - 2:21
18. "Dean’s Dream" - 1:49
19. "Laundromat Song" - 1:47
20. "Nutrition" - 2:17
21. "Tugena" - 5:27 (instrumental)

"Gorilla Girl" was not included on the original U.S. Enigma/Fever LP release. "Tugena" was present on the original release (as the last track) but was unidentified and not labeled until later pressings.

== Personnel ==
- Dave Blood – bass guitar
- Joe Jack Talcum – guitar, vocals
- Rodney Anonymous – vocals
- Dean Clean – drums
