= Burn Witch Burn (disambiguation) =

Burn Witch Burn is a Philadelphia-based Celtic rock band.

Burn Witch Burn may also refer to:

- Burn Witch Burn (film), a 1962 horror film known outside of America as Night of the Eagle
- "Burn, Witch. Burn!" (American Horror Story), a 2013 episode of American Horror Story: Coven

== See also ==
- Burn the Witch (disambiguation)
