= Trocadero Theatre =

Historic theater in Philadelphia, Pennsylvania, US

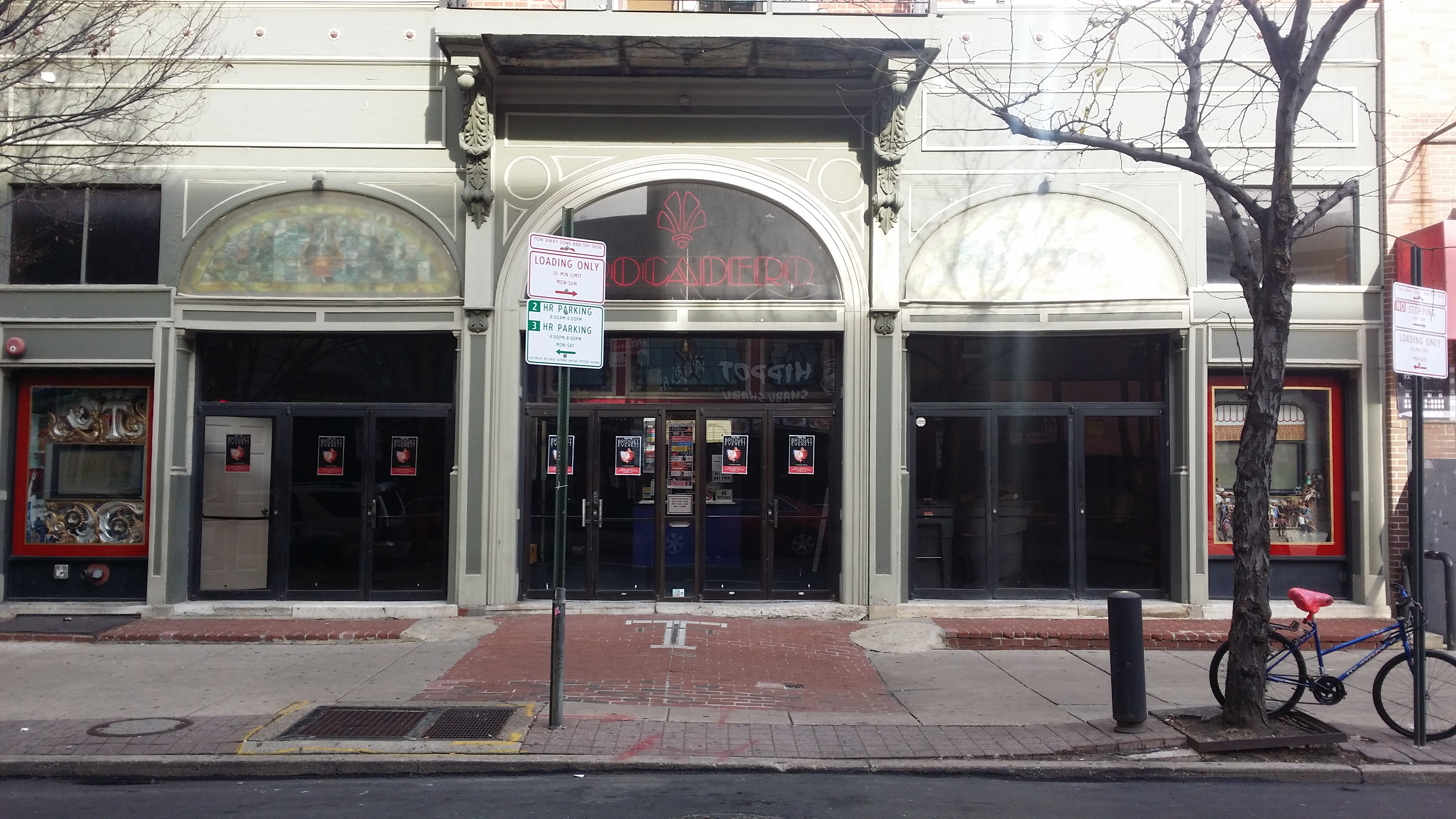
- Interactive map of Trocadero Theatre
- Address: 1003 Arch Street; Philadelphia, Pennsylvania; U.S.
- Capacity: 1,200
- Current use: live music venue

Construction
- Opened: 1870

Website
- www.thetroc.com
- Arch Street Opera House
- U.S. National Register of Historic Places
- Location within Philadelphia Location within Pennsylvania Location within the United States
- Coordinates: 39°57′12.99″N 75°9′24.74″W
- Area: < 1-acre (4,000 m^{2})
- Architect: Edwin Forrest Durang, George W. Plowman
- Architectural style: Late Victorian
- NRHP reference No.: 78002442
- Added to NRHP: June 13, 1978

The Trocadero Theatre (opened as the Arch Street Opera House) is a historic theater located in Chinatown in Philadelphia, Pennsylvania. It offered musical comedies, vaudeville, opera, and burlesque. The Trocadero Theatre was refurbished for use as an art house cinema and fine arts theatre in 1970s, and by the 1990s had become an iconic venue for rock and punk concerts.

== History ==
=== 19th century ===
Designed by architect Edwin Forrest Durang, it opened as the Arch Street Opera House on August 29, 1870. Despite its name, it operated as a venue not for opera but vaudeville, minstrel shows, and musical comedies. It was renamed the Trocadero Theatre in 1896. At that time it underwent a renovation using a plan by George Plowman.

=== 20th century ===
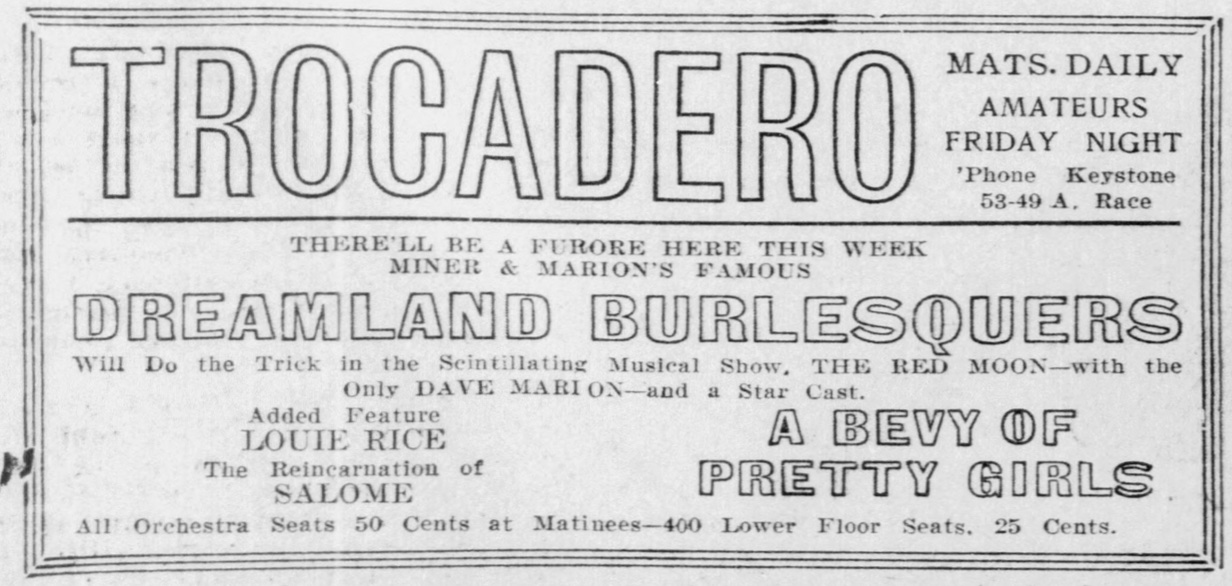
Trocadero newspaper advertisement in The Philadelphia Inquirer, April 4, 1909

It was modified several times, was added to the Philadelphia Register of Historic Places in 1973, and to the National Register of Historic Places five years later.

The building was known at various time as the Arch Street Opera House (1870–1879); Park Theatre (1879); New Arch Street Opera House (1884); Continental Theatre (1889); Gaiety Theatre (1890); Casino/Palace Theatre (1892), Troc Theatre (1940); Slocum's and Sweatman's Theatre; Sweatman's Arch Street Opera House; Simmon's & Slocum's Theatre; and Simmon's Theatre. It was already referred to as the Trocadero Theater in 1908.

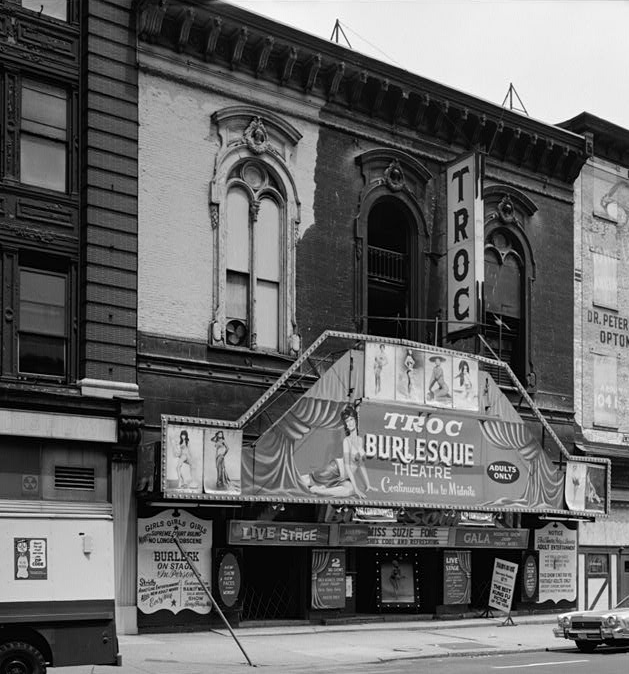
The theater in 1973

The Trocadero was a burlesque theater from the early 1900s until the 1970s. Burlesque performer Mara Gaye performed here in the 1950s.

The Pennsylvania Opera Theater, in 1982, was presenting three productions a year at the Trocadero.

In 1986, the Trocadero was again remodeled for its current use as a concert hall and dance club. The Trocadero retains a promoting team and books bands directly. It has a capacity of 1,200 patrons (standing room) or 600 patrons (fully seated).

The theater hosted a wide range of events including movie screenings, comedy shows, burlesque, and concerts from alternative, indie rock, heavy metal, punk rock, jam, industrial, gothic bands, and hip hop and electronica artists.

Bob Dylan performed at the Troc on December 11, 1997.

=== 21st century ===
Galactic Empire performed at the venue on June 3, 2017 as part of the Wizard World Comic Con.

After several days of rumors and a last-minute attempt by local promoters to save it, Philadelphia's Trocadero Theatre, part of the city's entertainment skyline since 1870, closed in May 2019.

In October 2022, it was announced that Northwest Arch LLC, the group shown to legally own the Trocadero, had applied for and subsequently received a $2.5 million state-issued grant through Pennsylvania's Redevelopment Assistance Capital Program. Plans were announced soon thereafter that the theater would be undergoing a "complete renovation of the exterior and interior of the Trocadero building. The end product will be a fully updated first-class concert venue, entertainment space and full-service restaurant." No immediate timeframe was given for commencement or completion of the renovations. As of August 2025, that money has still not been spent.

== Recordings and broadcasts ==
A concert at the Trocadero was released by Combat Records as Ultimate Revenge 2 in 1989, featuring performances by bands Raven, Death, Forbidden, Dark Angel, and Faith or Fear.

A number of DVD and television specials have been filmed at the Trocadero, including the MTV program 2 Dollar Bill for My Chemical Romance in September 2006, comedian and actor Christian Finnegan's DVD/Comedy Central special Au Contraire in October 2008, comedian and actor Michael Ian Black's DVD/Comedy Central special Very Famous in March 2011, and comedian Dan Soder's Comedy Central special in December 2015.

The Dead Milkmen recorded their live album, Chaos Rules: Live at the Trocadero, at the Troc. In 1991, Tesla had a hit single with the live cover version of the Five Man Electrical Band song "Signs", which was recorded at the Troc.

The Trocadero was the location for Lamb of God's live DVD Killadelphia and for Job for a Cowboy's "Altered From Catechization" music video.

On June 2, 2012, professional wrestling promotion Chikara held the Chikarasaurus Rex: How to Hatch a Dinosaur internet pay-per-view at the Trocadero. Chikara held their next two pay-per-views, Under the Hood on December 2, 2012, and Aniversario: Never Compromise on June 2, 2013, at the venue.

== See also ==
- Chestnut Cabaret
