= The Low Budgets =

American punk rock group (2000-2008)

- Origin: Philadelphia, Pennsylvania
- Genres: Punk rock, surf rock, garage rock
- Years active: 2000–2008, 2015, 2022
- Labels: Chunksaah Records, Schuylkill Records
- Past members: Chris Seegel; Joe Genaro; Dan Stevens; Steve Levandoski; Brian Michael
- Website: lowbudgets.com

The Low Budgets was an American punk/garage rock band based in Philadelphia. They were a project of Dead Milkmen guitarist Joe Genaro (known as Joe Jack Talcum), and current bassist Dan Stevens. Vocalist and guitarist Chris Seegel and drummer Steve Levandoski completed the band's lineup. The Low Budgets released three albums and toured throughout North America and Europe.

== History ==
The Low Budgets formed in 2000 after the demise of Seegel and Genaro's former group, The Town Managers. For the new project, Genaro moved from guitar to electronic organ, while Stevens (formerly of Farquar Muckenfuss) and Levandoski formed the rhythm section. Utilizing the vintage organ, the group sought to integrate their garage rock influences into the punk rock sound of their previous bands.

The band released its debut 7-inch vinyl EP in 2001 on Nancy Boy Records. A second 7-inch EP and two albums followed on the Philadelphia-based Schuylkill Records label. They toured extensively during this time, with Stevens occasionally being replaced by touring bassists while occupied with familial obligations.

In 2007, the group released their third album, Leave Us a Loan, on Chunksaah Records, a record label run by members of the punk rock band The Bouncing Souls. This album was produced by former Town Managers member and frequent collaborator Brian Michael. Schuylkill Records also released a picture disc vinyl version of the record.

The Low Budgets went on hiatus and ultimately disbanded after Seegel emigrated to Berlin. Genaro and Stevens played in the reformed Dead Milkmen thereafter. Seegel formed the new group Lamebrains in Berlin, while Genaro also continued his solo career. Levandoski remained active in other Philadelphia-based groups, including Beast Infection. Outside of music, Seegel continued work in film and video, and Levandoski in journalism.

The group played two reunion shows in December 2015, with Brian Michael replacing Levandoski on drums. They played another show in November 2022 in Philadelphia.

== Members ==
- Chris Seegel (Chris Peelout) – vocals, guitar (2000–2008, 2015, 2022)
- Joe Genaro (Joe Jack Talcum) – organ, vocals (2000–2008, 2015, 2022)
- Dan Stevens (Dandrew This) – bass, vocals (2000–2008, 2015, 2022)
- Steve Levandoski (Steve Please) – drums (2000–2008)
- Brian Michael – drums (2015, 2022)

== Discography ==
=== Albums ===
- Go For Broke (2003, CD/LP - Schuylkill Records/Akhenation Music)
- Aim Low, Get High (2005, CD/LP - Schuylkill Records)
- Leave Us a Loan (2007, CD - Chunksaah Records, LP - Schuylkill Records)

=== EPs ===
- Go Bargain Hunting With the Low Budgets (2001, 7-inch - Nancy Boy Records)
- Buy One Song, Get One Free (2002, 7-inch - Schuylkill Records)
