= Burn Witch Burn =

Philadelphia-based Celtic rock band

- Origin: Philadelphia, Pennsylvania, USA
- Genres: Celtic rock, goth, American folk, punk
- Years active: 1994–2001
- Labels: Razler Records
- Past members: Rodney Linderman; Vienna Linderman; Bill Fergusson; Steve Demarest; Todd Yoder; Brett Acker

Burn Witch Burn were an American Celtic rock/goth/Appalachian/Gypsy/folk/punk rock band based in Philadelphia, Pennsylvania and active between 1994-2001. The band was a side project of Dead Milkmen singer and keyboardist Rodney Linderman.

== History ==
The band formed in 1994, around the time the Dead Milkmen announced their plans to disband the following year after a final tour and album. Taking their name from the 1962 horror film of the same name, Burn Witch Burn was composed of Linderman, his wife Vienna, Bill Ferguson, Todd Yoder, Brett Acker, and Steve Demerest. They crafted a distinct sound drawing from several forms of folk music (including Irish and Americana styles) and a "Pogues-esque" punk rock sensibility, with a dark element sufficient to frequently earn them "goth" and "gypsy" tags. This dark edge, reflected in songs of murder, misery, alcoholism, pestilence and the occult, was a sharp left turn from the Dead Milkmen's comedic lyrical motifs, although Burn Witch Burn lyrics were not without their own sense of black humor (notable in such songs as "Treetop Flotilla", which includes an anecdote about an abusive, Led Zeppelin-listening "fake biker".) The band also utilized an array of unique instrumentation, including the tin whistle, violin, mandolin, banjolin, bouzouki, melodeon, and hurdy-gurdy, in addition to the standard guitar, bass and drums.

The band's first release was a six song demo tape in 1995. 1997 saw a seven-song self-released CD-EP, The Burning Times, which included a cover of The Velvet Underground's "All Tomorrow's Parties".

In 2000, Burn Witch Burn recorded a full-length, self-titled album, released on the Philadelphia-based Razler Records imprint (which was also the home to Butterfly Joe, a group featuring half of the Dead Milkmen). The album included re-recordings of much of the band's first two minor releases, some new original material, and a Rolling Stones cover, "Citadel".

The group disbanded in 2001. Fergusson and Rodney Linderman later formed the group 25 Cromwell Street, playing in the style of Burn Witch Burn and incorporating several of the latter group's songs into its set.

== Discography ==
- demo tape (1995, self-released cassette)
- The Burning Times (1997, self-released CD-EP)
- Burn Witch Burn (2000, Razler Records CD)

== Compilations ==
- Put Your Tongue To The Rail: The Philly Comp For Catholic Children (Songs of the Jim Carroll Band). Performed "Still Life". (1999, Genus Records CD)

== Members ==
- Rodney Linderman - vocals, tin whistle, recorder, melodeon, hurdy-gurdy (1994–2001)
- Vienna Linderman - vocals, violin (1994–2001)
- Bill Fergusson - mandolin, banjolin, bouzouki (1994–2001)
- Brett - mandolin, guitar, other stringed instruments (1994–1997)
- Rob Piekarski - guitar, mandolin (1997–2001)
- Steve Demarest - bass (1994–2001)
- Todd Yoder - drums (1994–2001)
