= Burn the Witch =

Burn the Witch may refer to:

- Burn the Witch (EP), a 2008 EP by Stone Gods
- "Burn the Witch" (Gotham), the second episode of the third season of Gotham
- Burn the Witch (manga), a Japanese manga series by Tite Kubo
- "Burn the Witch" (Queens of the Stone Age song), a 2005 song by Queens of the Stone Age
- "Burn the Witch" (Radiohead song), a 2016 song by Radiohead

== See also ==
- Burn Witch Burn (disambiguation)
- Burning Witch, an American doom metal band
- Burning Witch, a Swiss heavy/power metal band
- Burning the Witches, a 1984 album by Warlock
- Witch burning, death by burning in a witch-hunt
- Witchburner, a 1999 EP by Witchery
