= The Dead Milkmen =

American satirical punk rock band

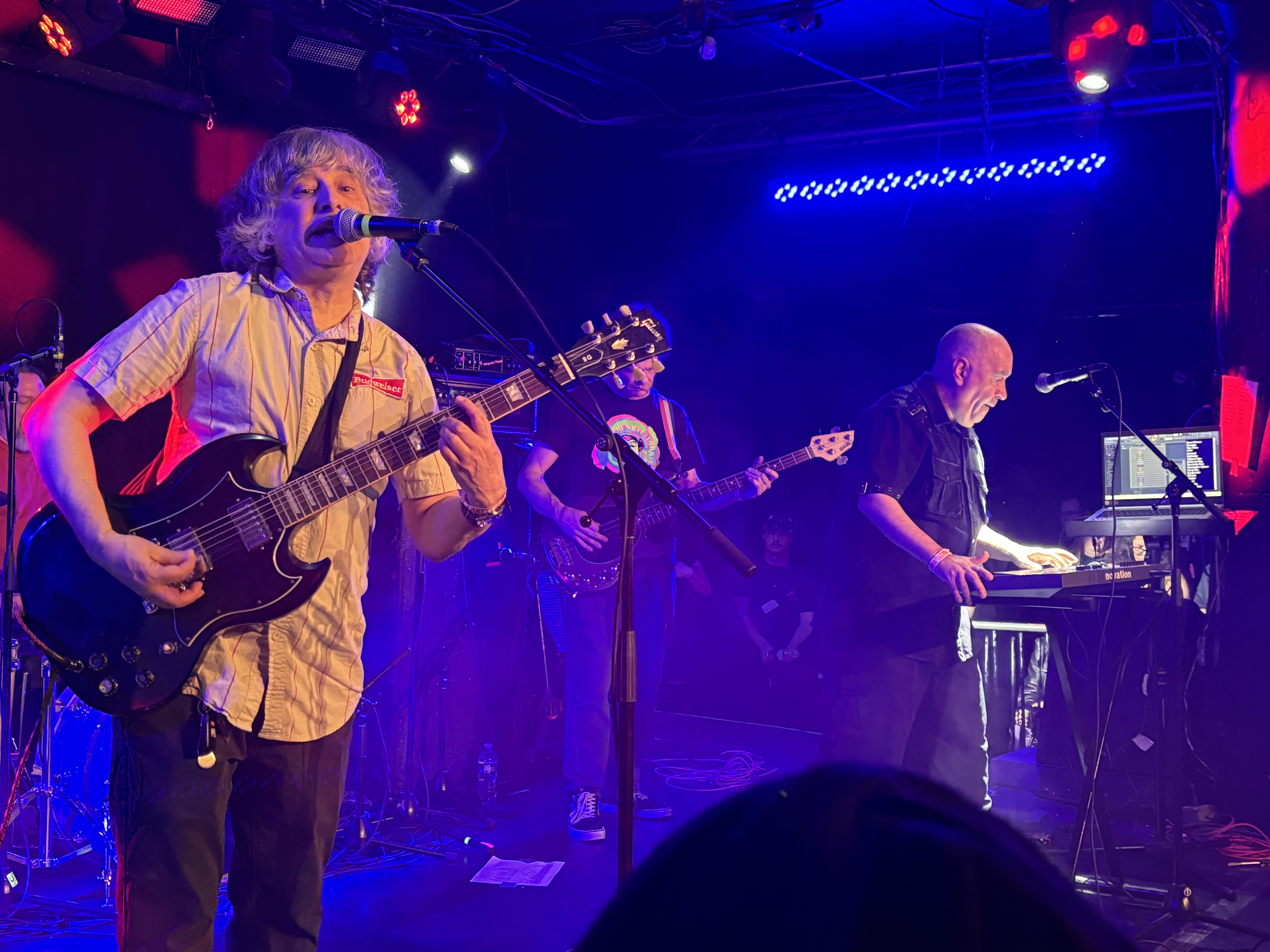
- Live at Underground Arts in Philadelphia, 2024

Background information
- Origin: Philadelphia, Pennsylvania, U.S.
- Genres: Punk rock; indie rock; cowpunk; comedy rock
- Years active: 1983–1995; 2004; 2008–present
- Labels: Restless; Enigma; Hollywood
- Members: Joe Genaro; Rodney Linderman; Dean Sabatino; Dan Stevens
- Past members: Dave Schulthise
- Website: deadmilkmen.com

The Dead Milkmen is an American punk rock band formed in 1983 in Philadelphia. Their original lineup consisted of vocalist and keyboardist Rodney Linderman ("Rodney Anonymous"), guitarist and vocalist Joe Genaro ("Joe Jack Talcum"), bassist Dave Schulthise ("Dave Blood") and drummer Dean Sabatino ("Dean Clean").

The band distinguished itself in the hardcore punk scene of the early 1980s through its jangly punk sound and sardonic humor delivered with thick Philadelphia accents. They attracted college radio attention with their 1985 debut album, Big Lizard in My Backyard, and the song "Bitchin' Camaro". Extensive touring and further releases helped the band garner an underground following.

The band enjoyed international success on the strength of "Punk Rock Girl", a single from their 1988 Beelzebubba album which entered into MTV rotation. After an ill-fated stint with major record label Hollywood Records, health problems and industry frustrations in the wake of their success led to the group's 1995 breakup.

The group reunited in 2008, with Dan Stevens replacing the deceased Schulthise. In 2011, they released The King in Yellow, their first studio album in 16 years. The band remained active thereafter, touring sporadically and releasing further records.

== History ==
=== Formative period (1979–1983) ===
Conceptually, the group began in 1979 as Genaro's home-recording project. Then based in Chester County, Pennsylvania, Genaro and his high school friend Garth created an imaginary band called The Dead Milkmen with a mythological back-story, recording homemade cassettes in keeping with their fictional characters. According to Genaro, the band's moniker came from a character named "Milkman Dead" in Toni Morrison's novel Song of Solomon. Linderman, who attended high school with Genaro, later participated in this embryonic stage of the group. The project became inactive when Garth departed to join the United States Air Force and Genaro relocated to the dormitories of Philadelphia's Temple University.

While in Philadelphia, Genaro met Schulthise and Sabatino through mutual friends. The three began loosely rehearsing together in 1981, taking their name from Genaro's home-recording project. Sabatino was the only member with experience in rock groups, having played previously in the two-piece new wave band Narthex. Linderman collaborated sporadically with the three during this period. He completed the lineup as lead vocalist in 1983, in time for their first public performance which took place July 23, 1983 at Harleysville Youth Center in Pennsylvania.

=== Early career and albums (1983–1987) ===
The band played frequently in Philadelphia's punk rock circuit and eventually began touring nationally. After several self-released cassettes, their debut LP, Big Lizard in My Backyard, was issued in 1985 on Restless Records, a subsidiary of Enigma Records. The album received college radio play, with the track "Bitchin' Camaro" becoming especially popular. Because of its improvised dialogue intro, the song remained a favorite at live shows.

Eat Your Paisley, their second album, was released the following year. "The Thing That Only Eats Hippies" became the band's first proper single and music video, and was a hit in Australia in addition to receiving domestic attention. Bucky Fellini followed in 1987, yielding the single "Instant Club Hit (You'll Dance to Anything)", a genre spoof of electronic dance music.

=== Commercial success (1987–1991) ===
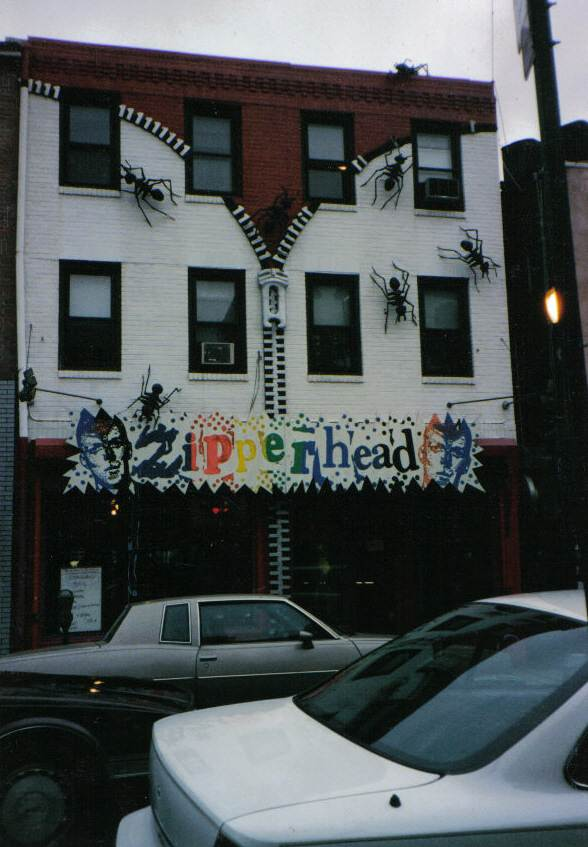
Zipperhead, the iconic punk clothing shop in Philadelphia's South Street district referred to in the single "Punk Rock Girl"

As the band toured extensively behind their records, they began to accrue increasing attention, which often came through unconventional routes. In 1987, Major League Baseball player Jim Walewander, a Detroit Tigers rookie, became a vocal fan of the band; this was noted on his baseball card (1988 Score, #571), which described the group as "an obscure punk-rock band". Walewander invited the band to Tiger Stadium to see a game in which he hit his first and only major league home run.

In 1988, they issued Beelzebubba, a comparatively polished record that yielded their most successful single, "Punk Rock Girl". Featuring Genaro on lead vocals, the track saw extensive rotation on MTV and propelled the album to number 101 on Billboard's Top 200. They later released the Smokin' Banana Peels EP and music video from this album. The 1990 followup, Metaphysical Graffiti, did not yield a hit, but also charted and helped solidify the group's presence in the independent rock scene.

=== Stint with Hollywood Records; breakup (1991–1995) ===
In 1991, the band left Restless and signed with The Walt Disney Company-owned Hollywood Records. Soul Rotation, their Hollywood debut released the following year, was focused more heavily on Genaro's singing and songwriting, with Linderman used predominantly as a keyboardist. The resulting record was much more pop-oriented than the group's previous efforts, but failed to produce a hit single. Not Richard, But Dick was issued in 1993, and did not fare any better than its predecessor. Relations between the band and label quickly soured, and the two albums went out of print shortly after their initial releases. The band was later unable to feature any of the songs from either of the Hollywood albums on retrospective or compilation CDs, although the group did smuggle an unlisted version of Soul Rotation's "If I Had a Gun" onto their 1994 live album Chaos Rules: Live at the Trocadero.

Later in 1994, The Dead Milkmen announced their decision to break up following a final tour and album. This was due in part to the tendinitis Schulthise began to suffer in his hands, which made performing intensely painful, as well as the band's increasing frustration with commercial and industry struggles. Restless Records released what was planned to be their final studio album in 1995, Stoney's Extra Stout (Pig). Several compilations of both hits and rarities were later released.

=== Post-breakup (1995–2008) ===
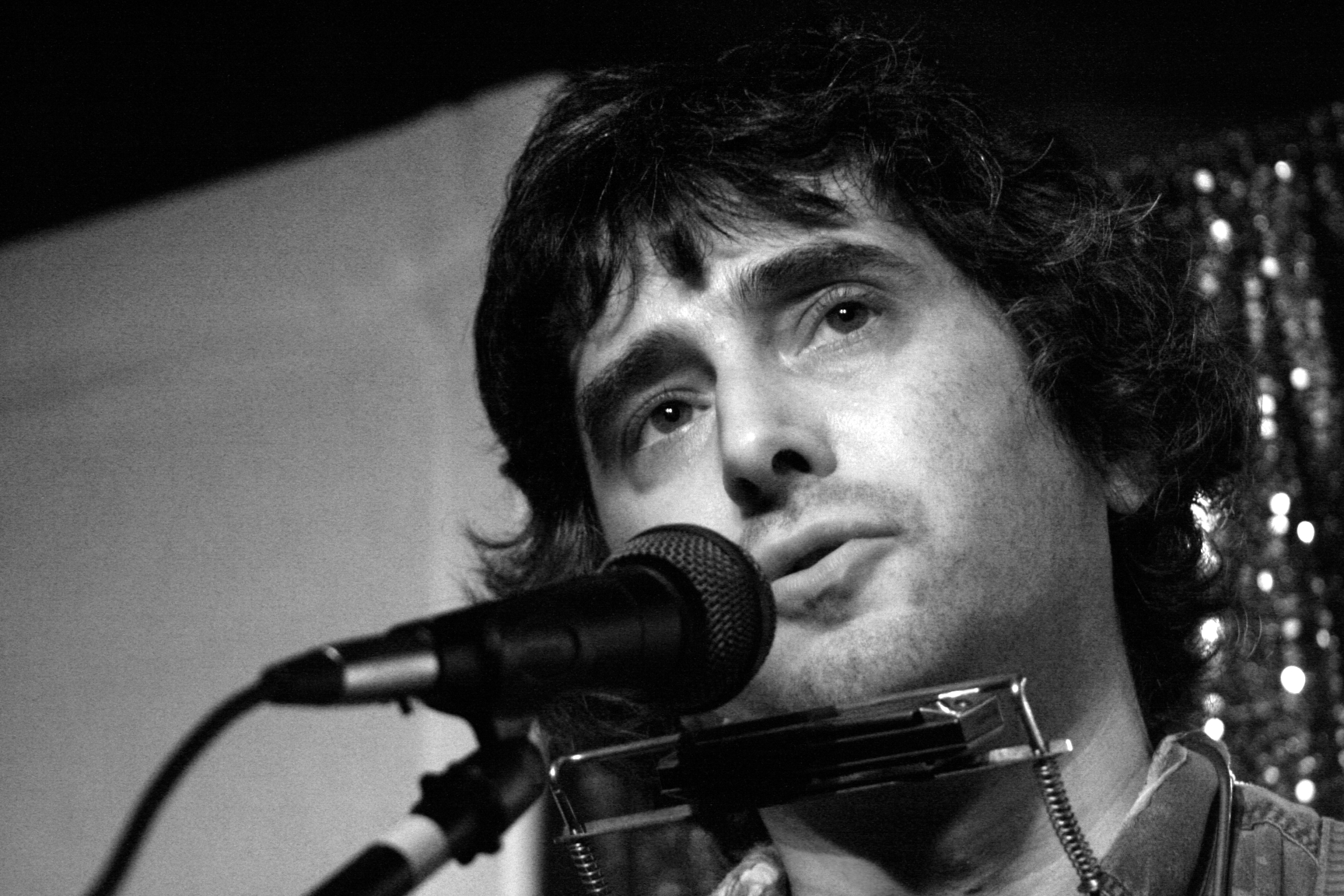
Genaro played with numerous other groups and embarked upon a solo career while the Dead Milkmen were inactive.

The band then took a 13-year hiatus. During this time, Linderman performed with the gothic, Celtic punk band Burn Witch Burn and worked in journalism and blogging, including writing for the Philadelphia Weekly. Sabatino played with the Big Mess Orchestra and The Hunger Artists, two sporadically active projects, as well as Genaro's post-Milkmen group Butterfly Joe. Genaro remained the most musically active member of the band during its split, consistently recording and performing with groups such as Butterfly Joe, Touch Me Zoo, the Town Managers and The Low Budgets, while also maintaining a low-key solo career.

Schulthise attended Indiana University to study Serbo-Croatian language, literature, history, and culture. In 1998 he moved to Novi Sad, Serbia, where he taught English. His writing was published several times in Svetigora, the magazine of the Serbian Orthodox Church. He hoped to contribute to the country's regrowth and development, but fled in April 1999 when NATO bombed the country.

In 2003, the band issued Now We Are 20, a repackaging of their self-released Now We Are 10 retrospective CD from 1993. They also collected their music video output and released it on the Philadelphia In Love DVD. Talks of reunion shows briefly emerged, but ended when Schulthise died by suicide on March 10, 2004. His death was reported in The New York Times and Rolling Stone.

The surviving members reunited for two consecutive shows in November 2004 at the Trocadero Theatre in Philadelphia, with Dan Stevens of The Low Budgets playing bass. The shows were intended to pay tribute to Schulthise, and proceeds were donated to a variety of mental health organizations and to Studenica Monastery in Serbia, which he had admired.

=== Reunion (2008–present) ===
In late 2008, the band reunited to play their first performances since the Schulthise memorial shows, with Stevens again on bass. After two back-to-back warm-up shows in Philadelphia, including one billed under the pseudonym Les Enfants Du Prague, they played the Fun Fun Fun Fest in Austin, Texas. Following these concerts, they decided to continue as an active group.

They spent the following two years composing new material before entering the recording studio late in 2010. On March 19, 2011, a new album, The King in Yellow, was released in digital form on the band's website, with a self-released CD following shortly thereafter.

In late 2012, they released "Dark Clouds Gather Over Middlemarch" and "Big Words Make the Baby Jesus Cry", the first two installments in a series of limited-run singles. This was also the year they appeared on nerdcore rapper MC Lars' EP, Edgar Allan Poe EP, for a new recording of Lars' song, "Mr. Raven", which was originally released on his 2006 album, The Graduate. "The Great Boston Molasses Flood", the third release in their singles series, was released on March 15, 2013; the fourth, "Welcome to Undertown", followed on June 21.

The band released Pretty Music for Pretty People, their tenth studio album, on October 7, 2014. The following year, SRA Records issued their split 7-inch with the 1980s Philadelphia hardcore band Flag of Democracy (also known as F.O.D.)

In July 2017, The Dead Milkmen joined with philanthropic record label the Giving Groove.

From 2021 through 2025 The Dead Milkmen published over 150 videos on YouTube. The general format has each member giving their thoughts on a particular question. They take turns deciding what the weekly question is. This is typically followed by another round where they give a general recommendation.

On June 9, 2023, The Dead Milkmen released the LP Quaker City Quiet Pills.

== Members ==
Current members

- Joseph Genaro (Joe Jack Talcum, Jasper Thread, Butterfly Fairweather)– guitar, vocals, keyboards (1983–1995, 2004, 2008–present)
- Rodney Linderman (Rodney Anonymous, Rodney Anonymous Melloncamp, Rodney "Cosloy" Anonymous, Rodney Amadeus Anonymous, H.P Hovercraft)– vocals, keyboards, tin whistle (1983–1995, 2004, 2008–present)
- Dean Sabatino (Dean Clean, Malory)– drums, percussion, vocals (1983–1995, 2004, 2008–present)
- Dan Stevens (Dandrew)– bass guitar (2004, 2008–present)

Former members

- Dave Schulthise (Dave Blood, Lord Maniac, 11070)– bass guitar, vocals (1983–1995; died 2004)

== Discography ==
=== Studio albums ===
- Big Lizard in My Backyard (1985)
- Eat Your Paisley! (1986)
- Bucky Fellini (1987)
- Beelzebubba (1988)
- Metaphysical Graffiti (1990)
- Soul Rotation (1992)
- Not Richard, But Dick (1993)
- Stoney's Extra Stout (Pig) (1995)
- The King in Yellow (2011)
- Pretty Music for Pretty People (2014)
- Quaker City Quiet Pills (2023)

=== Live albums ===
- Chaos Rules: Live at the Trocadero (1994)

=== Compilations ===
- Now We Are 10 (1993)
- Death Rides a Pale Cow (The Ultimate Collection) (1997)
- Cream of the Crop (1998)
- Now We Are 20 (2003)
- The Dead Milkmen Present: Philadelphia in Love DVD (2003)
- "Depends On the Horse..." (2020)

=== Singles and EPs ===
- The Thing that Only Eats Hippies (1987)
- Instant Club Hit EP (1987)
- Punk Rock Girl (1988, 1989)
- Smokin' Banana Peels EP (1988, 1989)
- If I Had a Gun EP (1992)
- Dark Clouds Gather Over Middlemarch (2012)
- Big Words Make the Baby Jesus Cry (2012)
- The Great Boston Molasses Flood (2013)
- Welcome to Undertown (2013)
- Split 7-inch with Flag of Democracy (2015)
- Prisoner's Cinema (2015)
- Welcome to the End of the World EP (2017)
- (We Don't Need This) Fascist Groove Thang EP (2020)
- Grandpa's Not a Racist (He Just Voted For One) (2023)

=== Self-released cassettes ===
- So Long Seventies (1979)
- Folk Songs for the 80s (1980)
- Sour Milk (1980)
- Music for the Mindless (1980)
- For Die Hard Fans Only (1980)
- Doctor Talcum's Studio of Fear (1981)
- Cows and Gals (1981)
- Raging Cow (1981)
- Paradise Lagoon (1981)
- The Salamander Sessions (1981)
- Living Death in the Cellar of Sin (1981)
- Nine New Sins (1982)
- Purgatory Beat (1982)
- Wisconsin (1983)
- A Date with The Dead Milkmen (1983)
- Millersville Delivery (1983)
- Funky Farm (1983)
- Death Rides a Pale Cow (1984)
- The Dead Milkmen Take the Airwaves (1984)
- Someone Shot Sunshine (1984)
