= Not Richard, But Dick =

Studio album by the Dead Milkmen
- Released: October 12, 1993
- Genres: Punk rock, comedy rock, indie rock
- Length: 27:56
- Label: Hollywood
- Producers: The Dead Milkmen, Jon Lupfer

The Dead Milkmen chronology
Soul Rotation (1992)	Not Richard, But Dick (1993)	Chaos Rules: Live at the Trocadero (1994)

Not Richard, But Dick is the seventh studio album by the Dead Milkmen, released in 1993 via Hollywood Records. Like Soul Rotation, the album was a commercial disappointment. After being out of print for years, Hollywood Records released the album for digital download on April 2, 2013. The title of the album is not a reference to "Tricky" Dick Nixon (former POTUS Richard M. Nixon), but rather a person by the name of Richard J. "Dick" Latch, who preferred to be addressed as "Not Richard, but Dick."

== Production ==
The album was produced by Jon Lupfer and the band.

== Critical reception ==
Professional ratings
Review scores
Source	Rating
AllMusic	1.5/5 stars
Calgary Herald	B
The Encyclopedia of Popular Music	3/5 stars
MusicHound Rock: The Essential Album Guide	1/5 stars
The Philadelphia Inquirer	2/4 stars
Tampa Bay Times	3/5 stars

Trouser Press wrote that "the simplified Not Richard, but Dick favors down-the-hatch indie-rock, which suits the Milkmen fine but doesn’t make for as entertaining an experience." The Philadelphia Inquirer wrote that "the band expresses the discontent of today's teens and twentysomethings with a vividness rarely summoned by even conscientiously 'righteous' rockers." The Tampa Bay Times thought that "the Milkmen have always had problems making their punkish songs live up to the great titles ... on Not Richard, But Dick they again weigh in with some classic bits of satire and fall short on a few other occasions." The Scripps Howard News Service deemed the album "a goofy palate of cultural references sure to prompt laughter and groans."

== Track listing ==
1. "Leggo My Ego" - 2:21
2. "I Dream of Jesus" - 3:47
3. "Jason's Head" - 3:08
4. "Not Crazy" - 2:35
5. "Let's Get the Baby High" - 3:03
6. "Little Volcano" - 2:26
7. "Nobody Falls Like" - 1:50
8. "I Started to Hate You" - 3:17
9. "The Infant of Prague Customized My Van" - 1:54
10. "The Woman Who Was Also a Mongoose" - 3:35
