= Soul Rotation =

Studio album by the Dead Milkmen
- Released: April 14, 1992
- Genre: Punk, comedy rock
- Length: 42:45
- Label: Hollywood
- Producer: Ted Niceley

The Dead Milkmen chronology
Metaphysical Graffiti (1990)	Soul Rotation (1992)	Not Richard, But Dick (1993)

Soul Rotation is the sixth studio album by the Dead Milkmen, released in 1992. It was their first album to be released on Hollywood Records. The album was digitally re-released in 2013, after being out of print for many years.

The album peaked at No. 16 on Billboard's Heatseekers Albums chart.

== Production ==
Soul Rotation was produced by Ted Niceley. It marked the first time the band cut an entire album using digital recording methods. The band, heeding past criticism of their albums, decided to focus as much on the instrumentation as the lyrics. The Dead Milkmen improvised more in the studio, and are collectively credited with writing the songs. The band employed a horn section, The Uptown Horns, on several tracks.

== Critical reception ==
Professional ratings
Review scores
Source	Rating
AllMusic	2/5 stars
Calgary Herald	B
Chicago Tribune	3/4 stars
The Encyclopedia of Popular Music	3/5 stars
The Indianapolis Star	2/4 stars
Spin	1/1 star
Telegram & Gazette	3/4 stars

Trouser Press called Soul Rotation "the first genuinely good album of [the band's] career," writing that "the gentleness of the band’s adult humor is well-served by equally unprepossessing eclectic pop-rock that makes varied use of the Uptown Horns and Rodney’s keyboard sideline." The Tulsa World deemed it "funny ... even when it's dealing with serious subjects." The Indianapolis Star wrote: "Somewhere along the line, the Dead Milkmen lost their playful sense of humor. Despite the strong music, their ironic lyrics seem flat without the punchlines."

The Ottawa Citizen wrote that "the arrangements here are carefully conceived and comparatively hook-laden." The Chicago Tribune judged it "a sprightly little pop album," writing that the "Philadelphia foursome is moving away from constant jokiness and concentrating more on melody and groove, even if it hasn't forsaken its tongue-in-cheek lyrics, amateurish vocals and unvarnished pep." The Gazette decided that the "smartass Philly thrash-soul-punkers make the big time with a major-label album that finds all of the humor intact ... even if the punk part sounds more like a frat affectation now."

== Track listing ==
1. "At the Moment" - 3:00
2. "The Secret of Life" - 4:20
3. "Big Scary Place" - 3:24
4. "Belafonte's Inferno" - 2:52
5. "The Conspiracy Song" - 2:21
6. "How It's Gonna Be" - 4:55
7. "All Around the World" - 3:56
8. "Silly Dreams" - 3:34
9. "Wonderfully Colored Plastic War Toys" - 2:36
10. "God's Kid Brother" - 2:39
11. "If I Had a Gun" - 2:28
12. "Here Comes Mr. X" - 2:18
13. "Shaft in Greenland" - 4:30
