= Dan Stevens (musician) =

American musician and songwriter (born 1978)

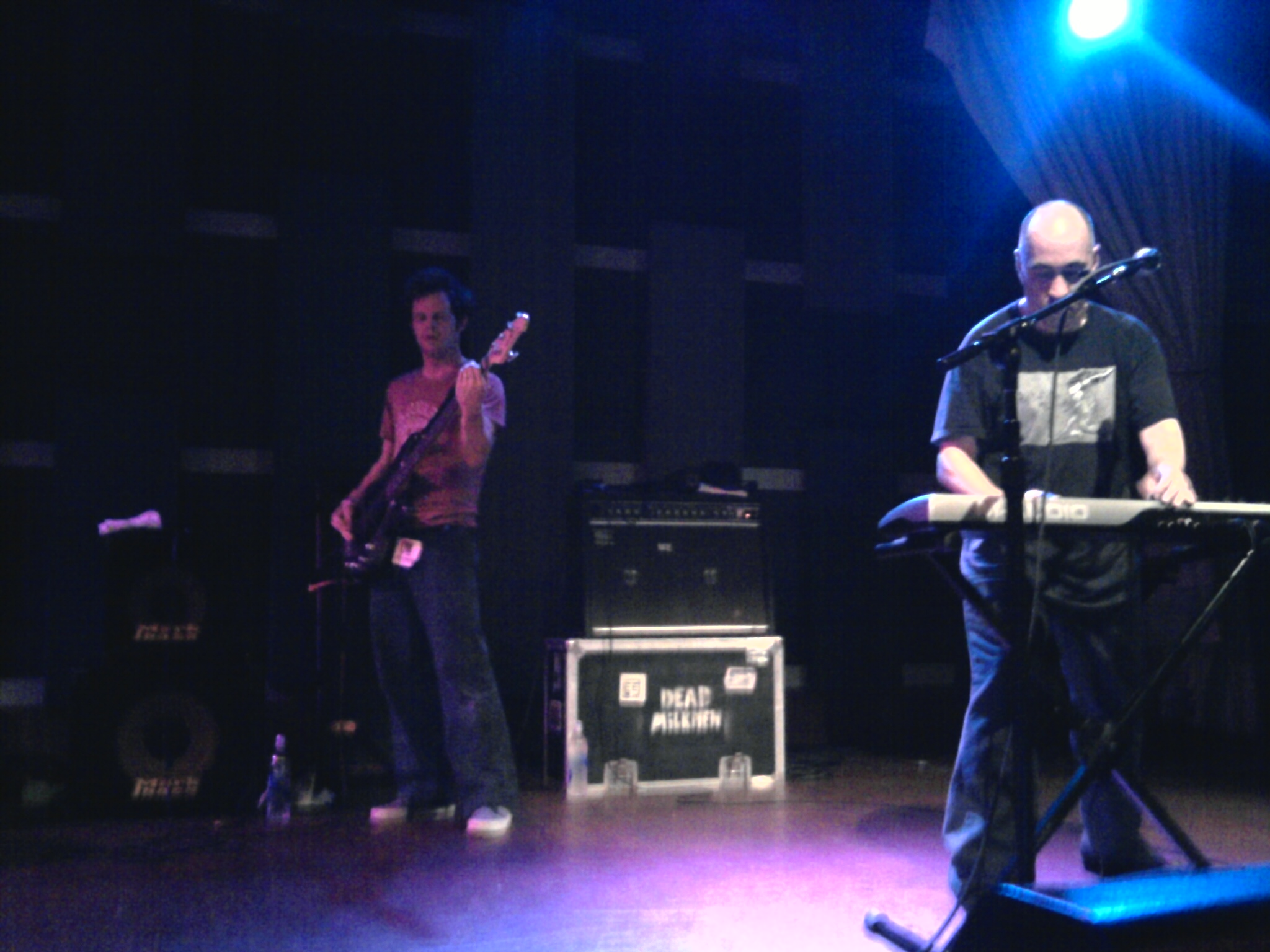
- Stevens (left) performs with Dead Milkmen band mate Rodney Linderman in 2010

Background information
- Also known as: Dandrew This
- Born: October 19, 1978 (age 46)
- Genres: Punk rock, indie rock
- Instrument(s): Bass guitar, keyboards, guitar
- Years active: 1996–present
- Labels: Chunksaah Records, Schuylkill Records

Daniel Keith "Dandrew" Stevens (born October 19, 1978 in New Jersey) is an American musician and songwriter.

Stevens is the current bassist in the punk rock group The Dead Milkmen, replacing the deceased Dave Schulthise for Dead Milkmen reunion performances in 2004 and officially joining the band during their 2008 reformation. Stevens has also played in several Philadelphia-area bands, including The Low Budgets (with Dead Milkmen bandmate Joe Genaro), Farquar Muckenfuss, The Uptown Welcomes, and V.A.K.E.P.O.R.

Stevens is frequently referred to by the nickname "Dandrew". He is the father of three children.
