= Joseph Genaro =

American guitarist (born 1962)

Joe Genaro
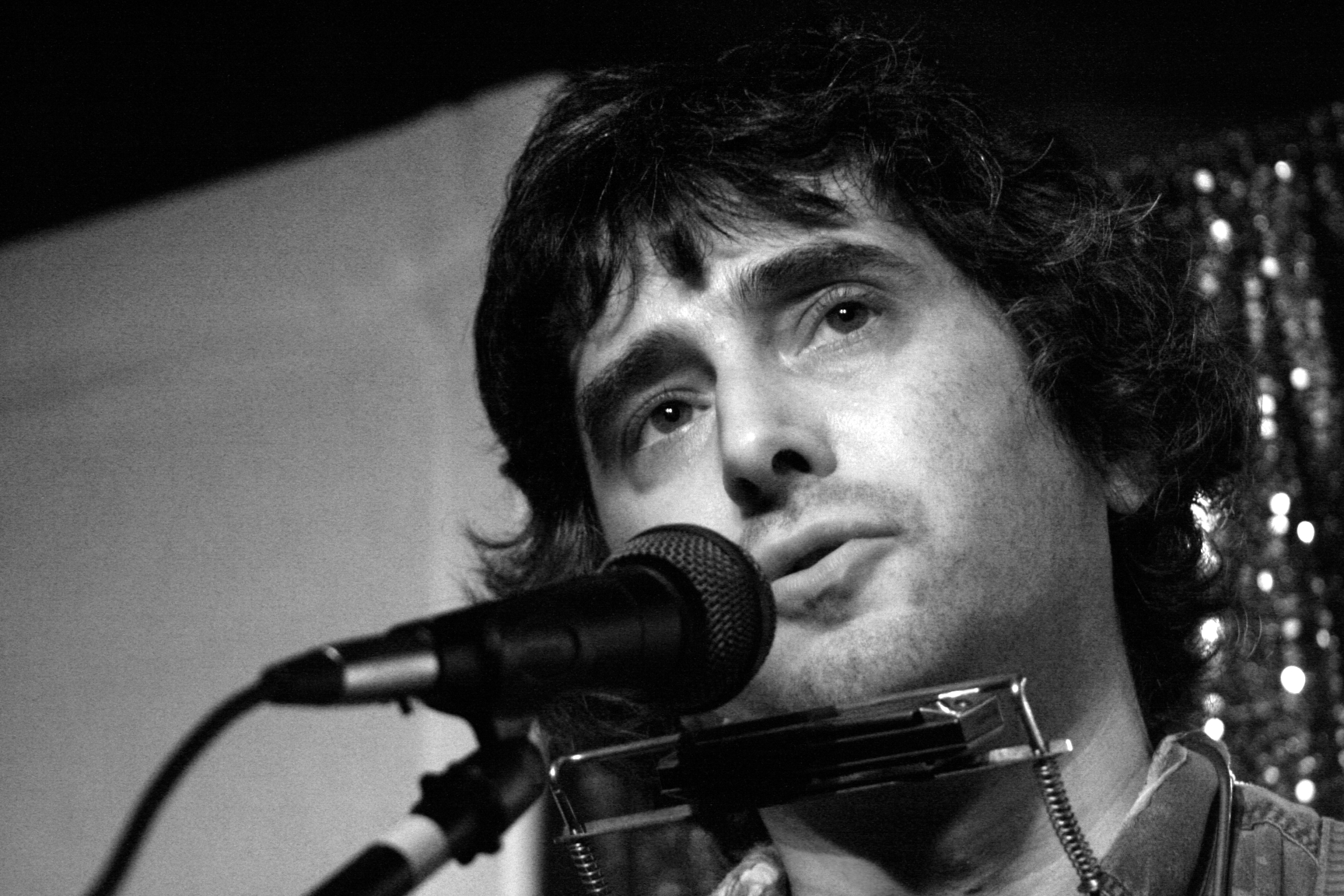

Background information
- Birth name: Anthony Joseph Genaro
- Also known as: Joe Jack Talcum, Jack Talcum, Jasper Thread, Butterfly Fairweather, Butterfly Joe, Jonk Provuc
- Born: October 15, 1962 (age 62); Wagontown, Pennsylvania, U.S.
- Genres: Punk rock, indie rock
- Occupation: Musician
- Instrument(s): Guitar, keyboards, vocals
- Years active: 1983–present
- Website: jacktalcum.com

Anthony Joseph Genaro (born October 15, 1962) is an American musician, best known as the guitarist and co-lead vocalist for the punk rock group The Dead Milkmen. Residing in Philadelphia, Genaro has performed with a number of punk and indie rock groups, most recently including The Low Budgets, and is also a solo artist.

== Career ==
=== With the Dead Milkmen (1983–1995) ===
The Dead Milkmen formed in 1983, evolving out of a home-recording project with a mythological back story that Genaro had begun in 1979. The members of the group regularly employed pseudonyms, and Genaro most frequently called himself "Joe Jack Talcum" (stemming from the character of Jack Talcum that Genaro had imagined as the leader of the band in their mythology) in the context of the group, although he also used the pseudonyms "Butterfly Fairweather" and "Jasper Thread" on certain records.

The band's debut LP, Big Lizard in My Backyard, was released in 1985, and their initial twelve-year career saw some college radio and MTV success, notably surrounding singles "Bitchin' Camaro" (1986) and "Punk Rock Girl" (1988). Genaro acted as the group's guitarist, co-lead vocalist and co-songwriter, and occasionally played keyboards and piano. The band disbanded in 1995.

=== As a solo artist (1984–present) ===
Genaro has consistently recorded solo material since the early 1980s. Between 1984 and 1999, he self-released eight cassette tapes composed of home recorded songs. The four-piece group Butterfly Joe, named after one of Genaro's pseudonyms and featuring Dead Milkmen drummer Dean Sabatino, assembled to perform Genaro's solo material. They released a self-titled, full-length album on Razler Records in 1999, but went on indefinite hiatus shortly thereafter.

In 2005, the Virginia-based Valiant Death label released a CD of material from Genaro's cassettes, Home Recordings 1984–1997. Under the name Joe Jack Talcum, he released Photographs from the Shoebox, a split LP/CD with Mischief Brew, in 2008 on Fistolo Records. The next year, his Live in the Studio album was released on CD and digital download formats. This record featured Genaro backed by a drummer and slide guitar/banjo player. Genaro also frequently tours behind his solo material.

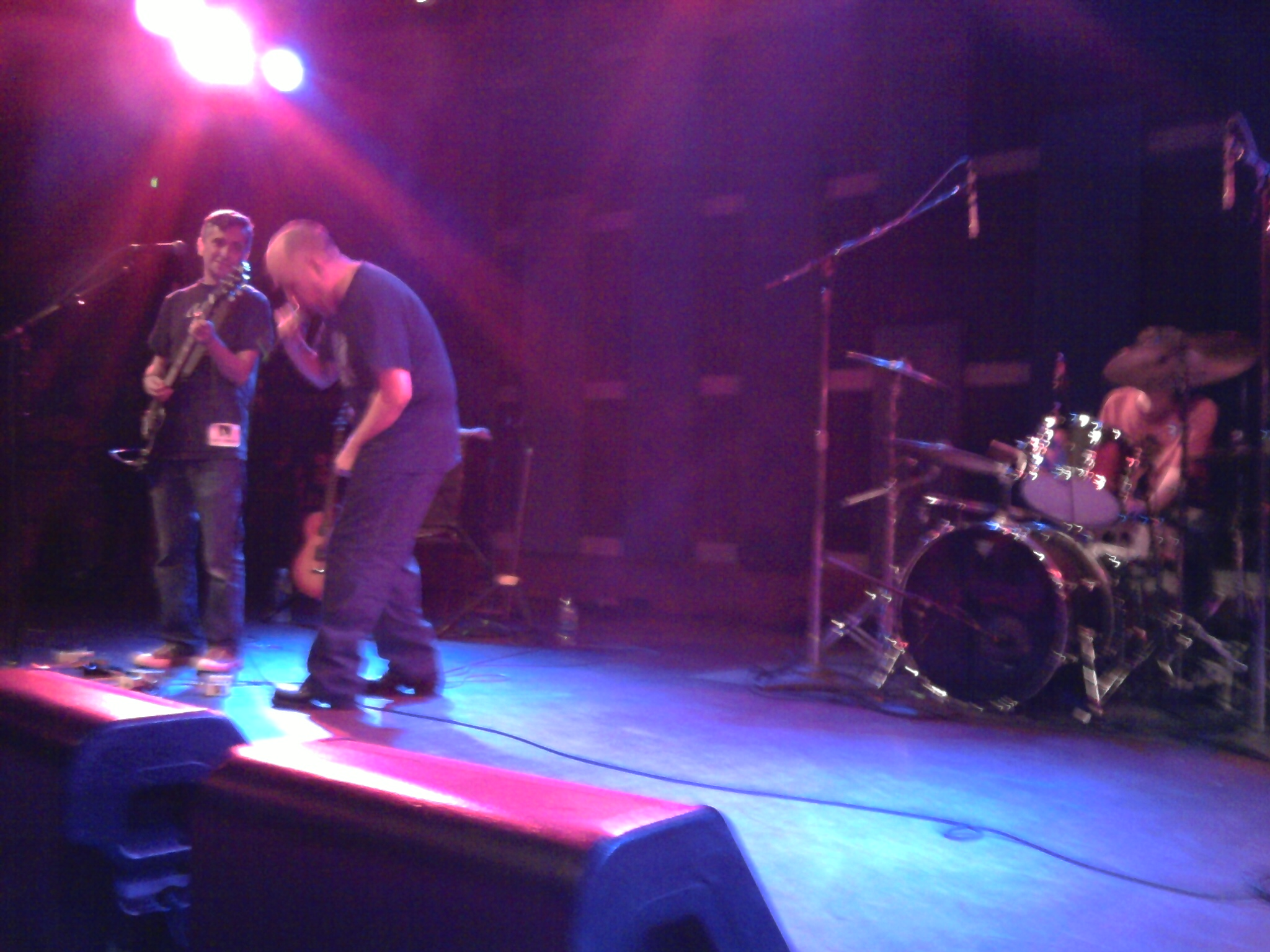
After two performances in 2004, Genaro (left) reformed the Dead Milkmen in 2008 with original members Rodney Linderman and Dean Sabatino.

=== Other projects (1987–present) ===
Other groups with whom Genaro has played include Ornamental Wigwam (circa 1987, a two-piece with Dead Milkmen bassist Dave Schulthise), Touch Me Zoo (1990–1997), The Town Managers (1996–2000), The Fresh Breaths (2000), The Low Budgets (2000–2008), Ukebox (circa 2006) and No! Go! Tell! (2009). Generally a guitarist, Genaro has also played bass guitar (in the cases of the Town Managers and Ukebox) and organ (in the case of the Low Budgets) in these bands. He has also formed a large number of home recording-based groups, including Jiffy Squid (circa 1993), We're Not From Idaho (circa 1995), Sock (1993–1998) and The Cheesies (circa 2003–present).

=== Dead Milkmen reformation (2004, 2008–present) ===
After the 2004 death of Schulthise, the three surviving members of The Dead Milkmen reunited for two concerts, joined by Low Budgets bassist Dan Stevens. In 2008, the band properly reformed with Stevens as a full-time member, and began performing sporadic concerts and working on new material, resulting in the 2011 album The King in Yellow.

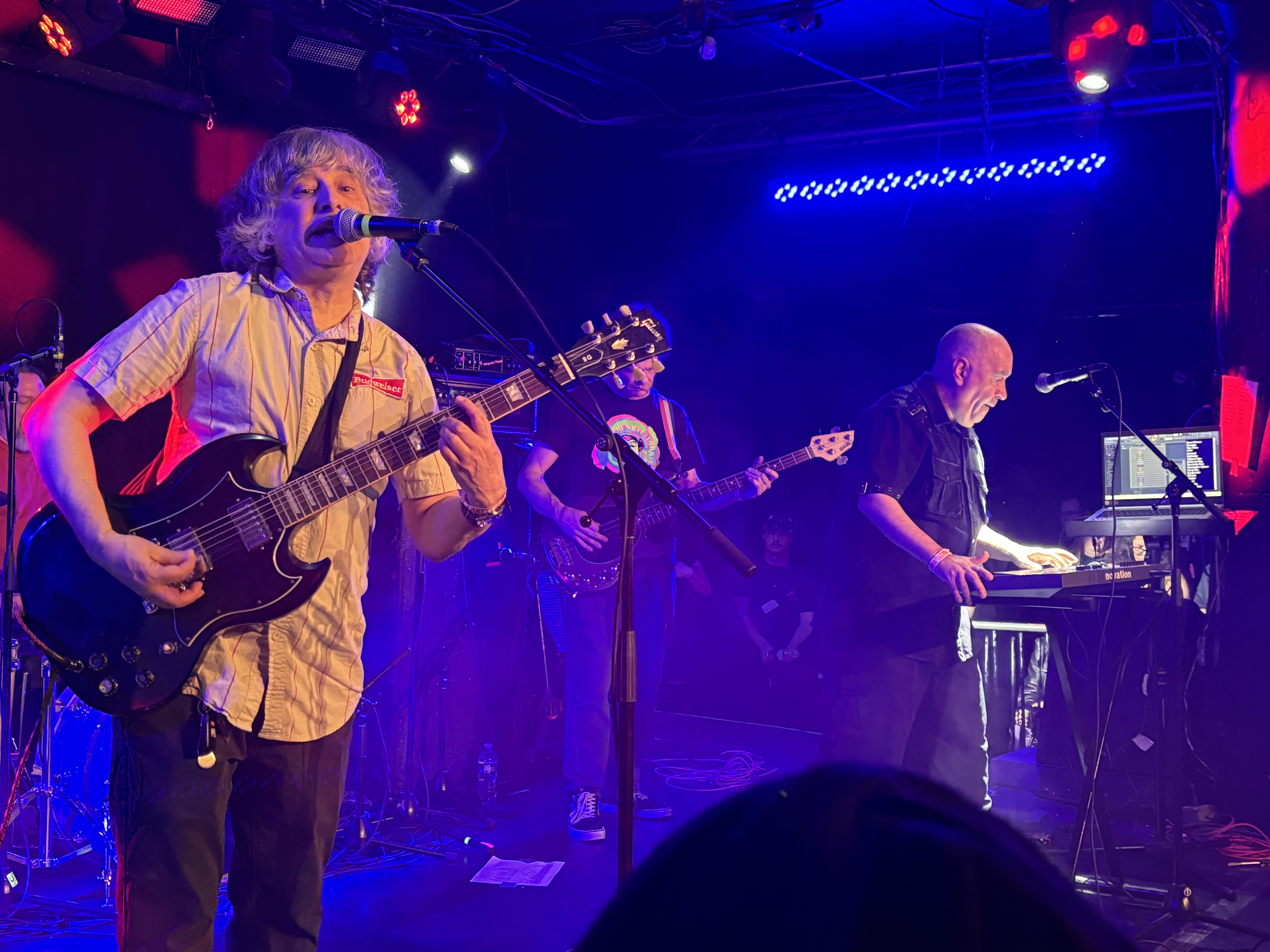
Joe Genaro performs with The Dead Milkmen at Underground Arts in Philadelphia on February 18, 2024.

== Personal life ==
Genaro is openly gay and has stated that he had never hidden his sexuality, although at some point while performing with the Dead Milkmen, he didn't feel comfortable writing about anything with an "obviously gay point of view." He later began broaching gay themes during the Butterfly Joe recordings.

== Discography ==
Compact disc and vinyl albums

- Butterfly Joe – self-titled (CD, Razler Records, 1999)
- Joe Jack Talcum – Home Recordings 1984–1997 (CD, Valiant Death Records, 2005)
- Joe Jack Talcum – Photographs from the Shoebox (split LP/CD with Mischief Brew, Fistolo Records, 2008)
- Joe Jack Talcum – Live in the Studio (CD, 2009)
- Joe Jack Talcum – Acoustic Fury Records Split Series Vol. 4 (split CD with Ratboy, Acoustic Fury Records, 2009)

Vinyl EPs

- The Town Managers – self-titled (7", Shredder Records, 1997)
- The Town Managers – We're The Ghettoest (7", Marigold Records, 1998)

Solo home-recorded cassette tapes

- Joe Jack Talcum – I See Weasels (1984)
- Joe Jack Talcum – Raising PG Kids (1987)
- Jasper Thread – Blackness (1989)
- Butterfly Fairweather – Halvin' My Baby (1990)
- Butterfly Joe – Smile (1993)
- Butterfly Joe – Sweet 'N Low (1995)
- Joe Jack Talcum – The Bland Years (1997)
- Jack Talcum Jr. – Turd of the Century (1999)

Home-released cassette tapes with groups

- Touch Me Zoo – Radio Songs (1991)
- Touch Me Zoo – self-titled (1992)
- Touch Me Zoo – Wonderwear Music (1993)
- Sock – Staring at People Staring at Trash (1993)
- Jiffy Squid – self-titled (1993)
- Touch Me Zoo – Moon Dog Will Die (1994)
- We're Not From Idaho – self-titled (1994)
- Touch Me Zoo – Lawn King (1995)
- Drink Draft / Rhino Chasers – self-titled (1996)
- Jiffy Squid – self-titled album (1996)
- Touch Me Zoo – Blow Up Your Stereo (1996)
- The Town Managers – Dummo (1996)
- Touch Me Zoo – Ultra-Rare TMZ Vol. 1 (1997)
- Touch Me Zoo – Ultra-Rare TMZ Vol. 2 (1997)
- Touch Me Zoo – Ultra-Rare TMZ Vol. 3 (1997)
- Sock – Demented Songs For Youngsters (1998)
- The Cheesies – Pull The Brie (2003)
- The Headaches – Christmas Album (2003)
- The Headaches – New Year's Eve with The Headaches (2004)
- The Headaches – Groundhogs Day (2004)
- The Headaches – Friday the 13th Album (2004)
- The Headaches – Mexican Independence Day (2004)
