= Dave Schulthise =

American musician

- Schulthise on stage

Background information
- Also known as: Dave Blood
- Born: September 16, 1956
- Died: March 10, 2004 (aged 47)
- Instrument: Bass guitar
- Years active: 1983–1995
- Formerly of: The Dead Milkmen

David Schulthise (September 16, 1956 – March 10, 2004), also known as Dave Blood, was an American musician best known as the original bass guitarist for the punk band The Dead Milkmen. Schulthise was born in Ridley Park, Pennsylvania. He helped form the band in 1983 along with fellow pseudonymous musicians Joe Jack Talcum, Dean Clean, and Rodney Anonymous. Prior to this he was a Ph.D. candidate in economics at Purdue University.

He stopped playing music in 1995 after the band broke up as the result of developing tendinitis in both hands.

Schulthise visited Yugoslavia while on tour with the Milkmen and became fascinated with Serbia, its culture and people. After the band disbanded, he enrolled at Indiana University to study Serbo-Croatian language, literature, and history. He moved to Serbia for work and study in 1998, but in the wake of the 1999 NATO bombing campaign there he was forced to return to the US.

In late 2003, he told an interviewer that his favorite bassists were Mike Mills (R.E.M.), Johnny Gayden (Albert Collins Band) and Charles Mingus.

Schulthise died by suicide from a drug overdose on March 10, 2004, at age 47.
