= Rodney Linderman =

American musician

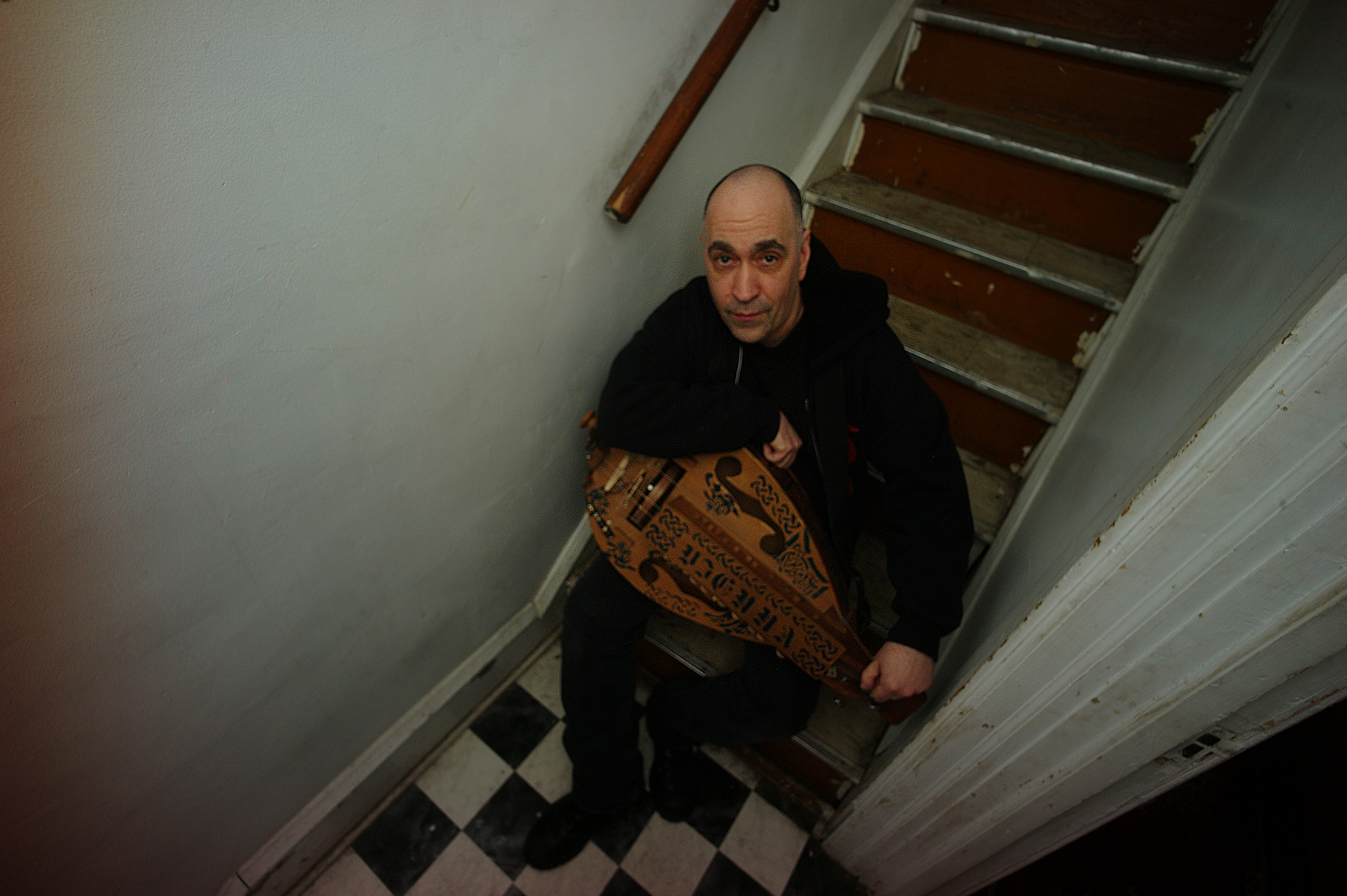
- Linderman with a hurdy gurdy

Background information
- Also known as: Rodney Anonymous, Rodney Amadeus Mozart, H.P. Hovercraft
- Born: Rodney Linderman; 21 May 1963 (age 62)
- Genres: Punk rock; folk
- Instruments: Vocals; keyboards; tin whistle
- Years active: 1983–present
- Labels: Restless Records, Hollywood Records, Razler Records
- Website: www.rodneyanonymous.com

Rodney Linderman (born 21 May 1963), also known by his stage name Rodney Anonymous, is an American musician, journalist, and humorist currently based in Philadelphia. He is best known as the lead vocalist, keyboardist and co-songwriter of the satirical punk rock band The Dead Milkmen.

== Early life and education ==
Linderman grew up in Coatesville, Pennsylvania. He attended Coatesville Area High School with future bandmate Joe Genaro. He went on to attend West Chester University.

== Musical career ==
=== With the Dead Milkmen (1983–1995) ===
Linderman joined an embryonic version of Genaro's basement group the Dead Milkmen while in high school around 1981. Briefly serving as drummer, Linderman had become the group's lead singer by the time of their first public performance in 1983.

Following the success of their 1985 debut LP, Big Lizard in My Backyard, the group toured extensively and enjoyed college radio and modest MTV-based success behind eight LPs. Linderman played keyboards and split vocals with Genaro.

=== Later activity; Dead Milkmen reformation (1995–present) ===
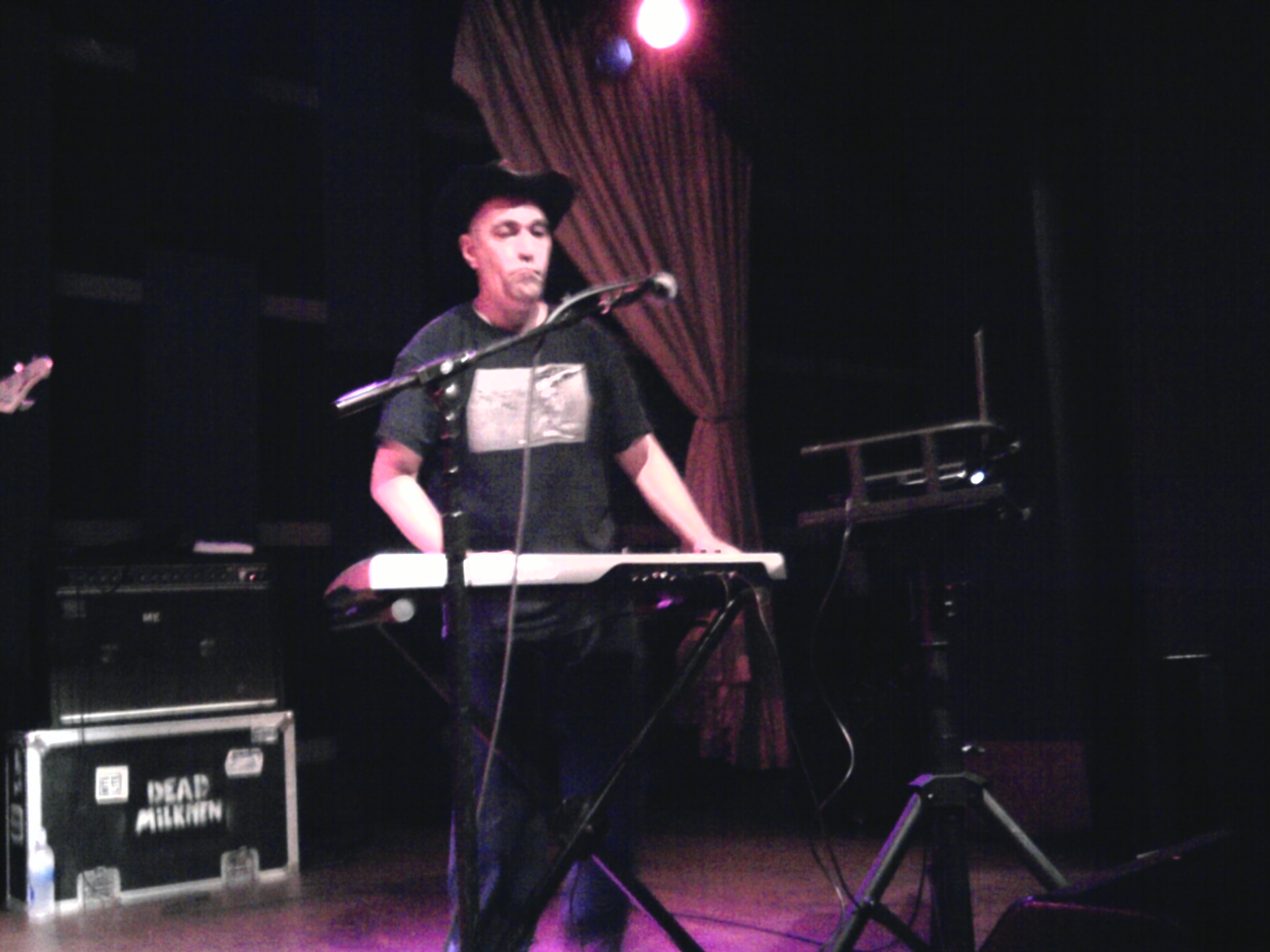
Linderman performing with The Dead Milkmen in 2010

Shortly before the Dead Milkmen disbanded, Linderman founded the group Burn Witch Burn with his wife Vienna and four other musicians. The group blended American roots music with Celtic folk, Pogues-styled punk and gothic leanings. They released a demo tape, one CD-EP and one full-length album before breaking up in 2001.

After two reunion shows in 2004, the Dead Milkmen officially reformed in 2008. Linderman, Genaro and drummer Dean Sabatino were joined by bassist Dan Stevens who replaced the deceased former bassist of the group, Dave Schulthise. They have since resumed performing regular concerts and working on new material.

Linderman also played in the group 25 Cromwell Street with Bill Fergusson of Burn Witch Burn.

He was also played synthethizers and drum machines in an industrial duo called 7th Victim with Janet Bressler on vocals.

== Journalism ==
Linderman keeps an active comedic/topical blog, Rodney Anonymous Tells You How to Live, as well as a radio show of the same name on Y-Not Radio. He regularly contributed to the Philadelphia City Paper, writing about music, as well as political, social and local issues.
