= Dean Sabatino =

American musician (born 1962)

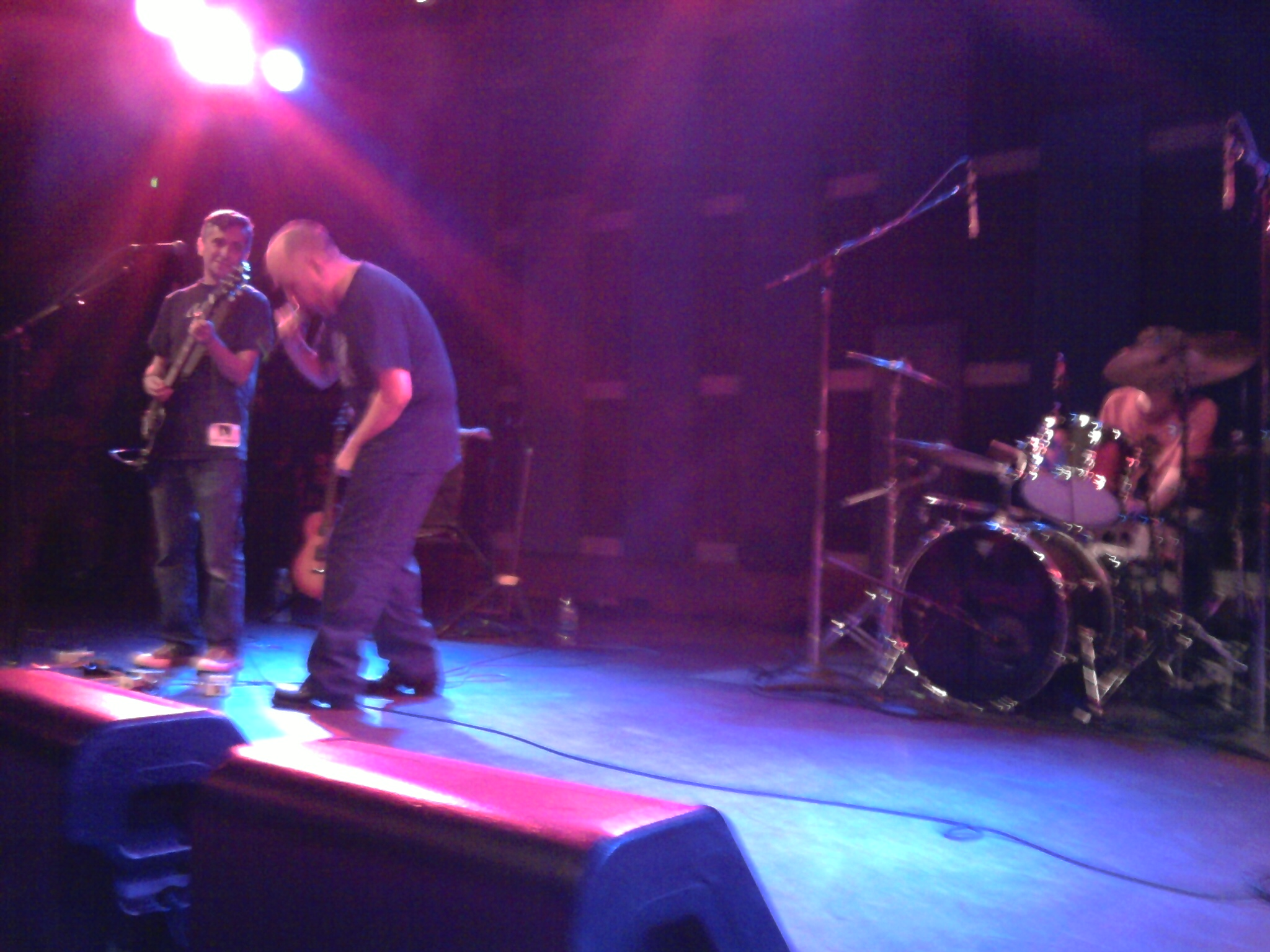
- Sabatino (right) and Dead Milkmen band mates in 2010

Background information
- Birth name: Dean Sabatino
- Also known as: Dean Clean, Mallory
- Born: 21 May 1962 (age 63)
- Instrument(s): Drums, keyboards, vocals
- Years active: 1982-present
- Website: www.deansabatino.com

Dean Sabatino (born 21 May 1962) is an American musician, best known as Dean Clean, the drummer of the satirical punk rock group the Dead Milkmen. Sabatino lives with his family in Media, Pennsylvania, a suburb of Philadelphia. Having earned a degree in commercial art, Clean designed the album covers for the band's releases, including the cover art for their 1985 debut album Big Lizard in My Backyard.

== Career ==
After playing with groups in high school, Sabatino formed Narthex, a two-piece new wave band, in 1980. The band failed to release a proper album before its split three years later, but a 1982 recording session was eventually remixed and released as the Twin Cities album in 2006.

Sabatino joined the Dead Milkmen as the only member with previous experience playing in rock bands. The group went on to enjoy college radio and modest MTV-based success through eight studio albums and substantial touring before disbanding in 1995. In the late 1980s, he also played with the rock group Baby Flamehead, who released one self-titled album.

In 1995, Sabatino's drumsticks were inducted into the Rock and Roll Hall of Fame as part of a 1300+ collection of signed drumsticks.

Sabatino and Dead Milkmen bandmate Joe Genaro formed the band Butterfly Joe in 1996, who released a self-titled album on Razler Records before disbanding in 2001. He also played drums with the vaudeville group The Big Mess Orchestra, with whom he remains sporadically associated.

After two reunion shows in 2004, the Dead Milkmen reformed in 2008 (with Dan Stevens replacing the deceased Dave Schulthise on bass guitar). They are presently performing concerts and working on new material. Sabatino has maintained the band's official website since its inception. Baby Flamehead also reunited in 2010.
