= List of Discharge band members =

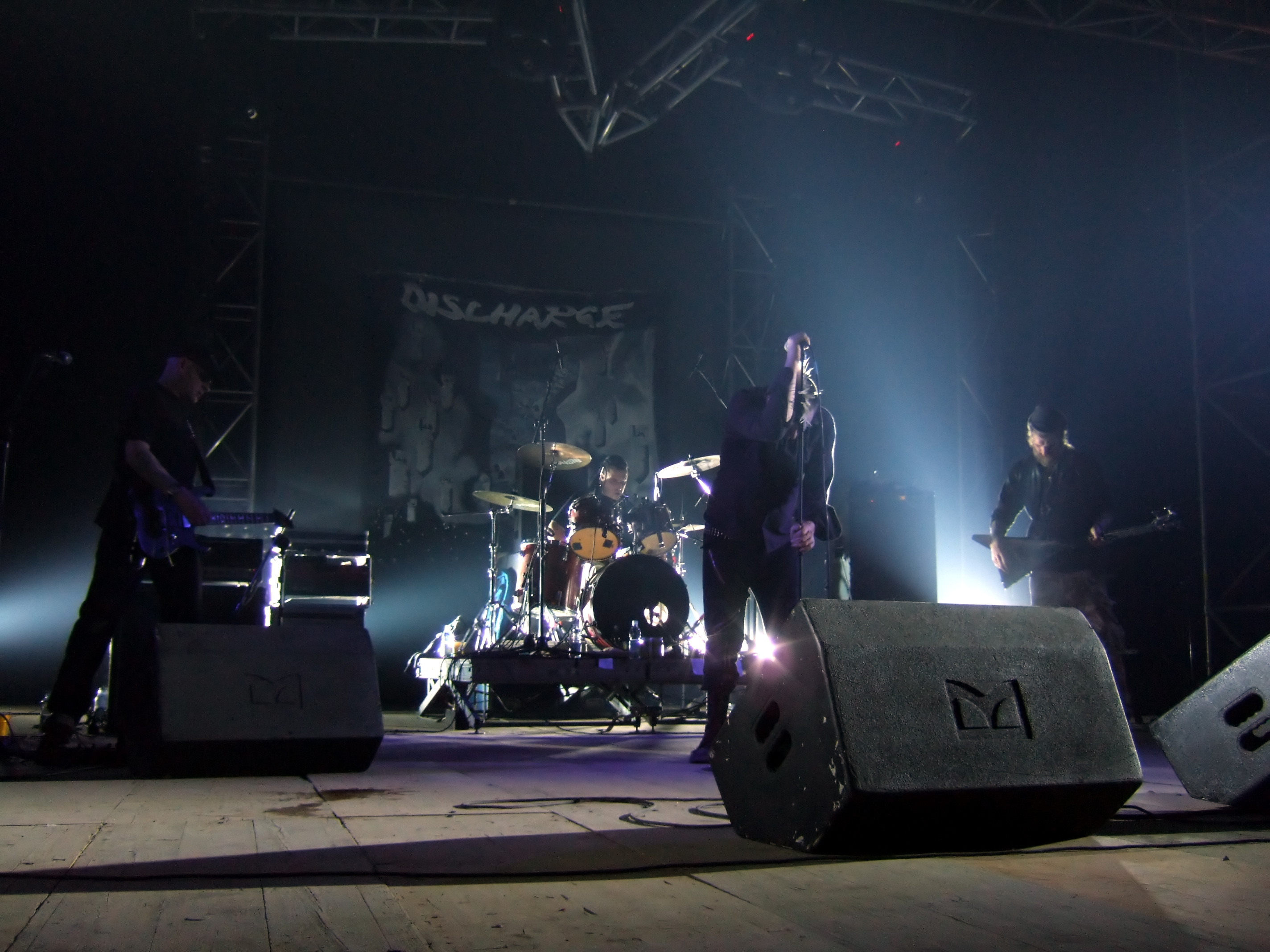
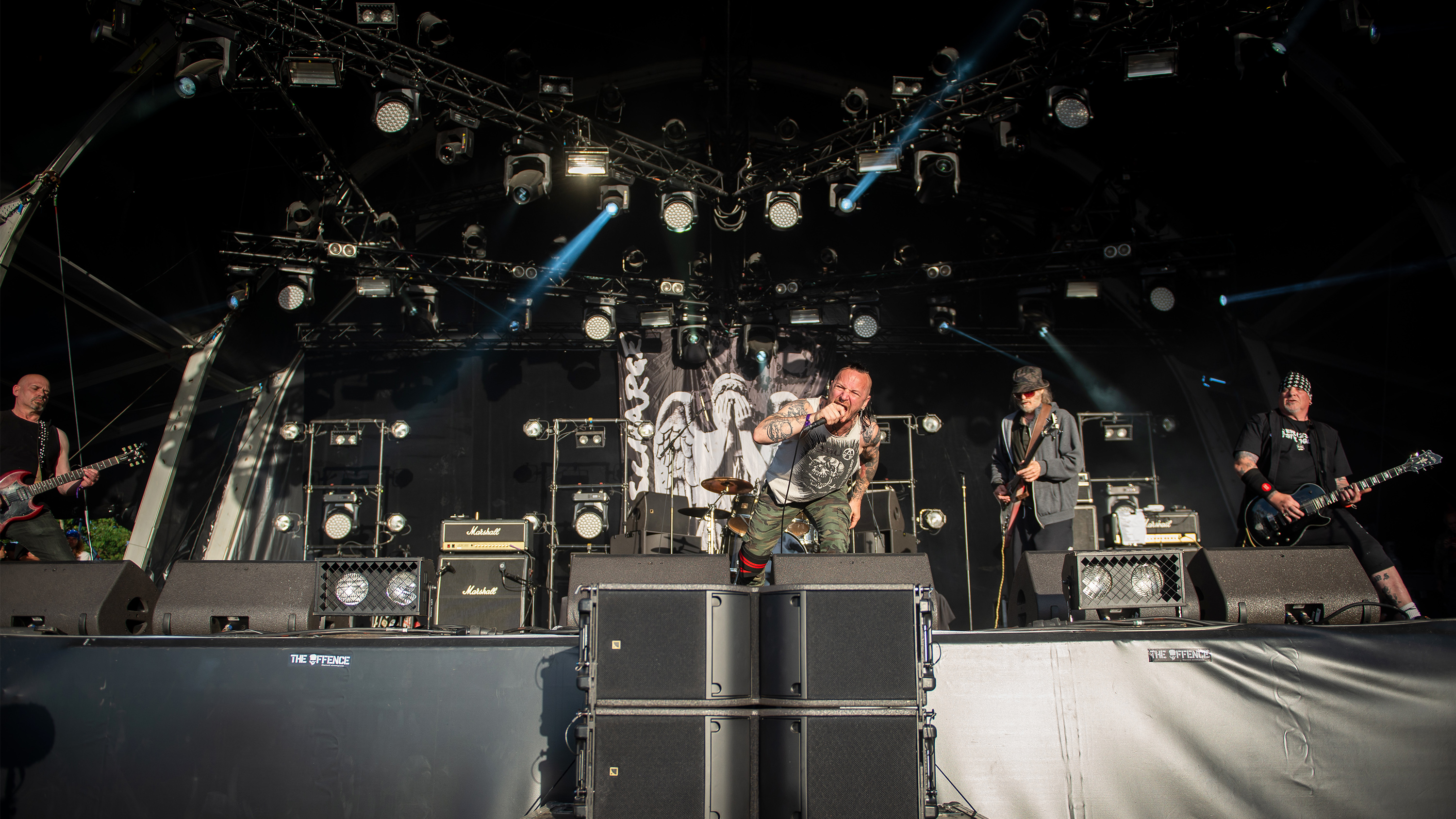
Discharge performing in 2006 and 2022.

Discharge are an English hardcore punk band from Stoke-on-Trent. Formed in early 1977, the group originally featured a lineup of vocalist Terry "Tezz" Roberts, guitarists Roy "Rainy" Wainwright and Tony "Bones" Roberts, bassist Nigel Bamford and drummer Tony "Acko" Atkinson. The band's current lineup features Rainy on bass (initially as guitarist, a constant member, save for the group's 1991–99 reunion), Bones on guitar (who originally left in 1982 and rejoined in 2001), Tezz on guitar (initially as vocalist, the band's drummer from 1977 to 1980 and 2001 to 2006, before rejoining in 2014), drummer Dave "Proper Caution" Bridgwood (since 2006) and vocalist Jeff "JJ" Janiak (since 2014).

== History ==
=== 1977–1987 ===
Discharge were originally formed in early 1977 by vocalist Terry "Tezz" Roberts and guitarist Roy "Rainy" Wainwright, with second guitarist Tony "Bones" Roberts (Tezz's younger brother), bassist Nigel Bamford and drummer Tony "Acko" Atkinson. Acko left the band after the recording of their first string of demos between March and June, with Tezz switching to drums, Rainy taking over from Bamford on bass, and roadie Kelvin "Cal" Morris joining as vocalist. After signing with local label Clay Records and releasing their first three EPs – Realities of War, Fight Back and Decontrol – the group lost another founding member as Tezz departed, who later explained that "we weren't refining [our sound] fast enough for my liking", adding "I had other plans... I wanted to play with as many bands as I possibly could."

With new drummer Dave "Bambi" Ellesmere, the band issued their fourth EP Why in 1981, before Garry Maloney took over in the summer in time for recording of their fifth, Never Again. After one final single, "State Violence State Control", Bones also left in late 1982 claiming that the band members "weren't getting along" and that Cal and Maloney were "letting [the band's growth] go to their heads". The guitarist went on to form Broken Bones with brother Tezz. He was replaced in Discharge by Peter "Pooch" Purtill, who is credited for introducing elements of heavy metal music into the band's sound. After releasing Warning: Her Majesty's Government Can Seriously Damage Your Health, "The Price of Silence" and "The More I See" with Pooch, both he and Maloney left Discharge in the summer of 1984.

Pooch and Maloney were replaced by Leslie "The Mole" Hunt and Micky "Heymaker" Gibson, respectively, who performed on 1985's "Ignorance" before leaving again. With guitarist Stephen "Fish" Brookes and returning drummer Maloney, Discharge finally issued their second album Grave New World the following year. The album was critically panned, with Classic Rock writer Sleazegrinder calling it "fucking horrible". Rainy, the last remaining original member, left before the album's release, with Nick Bushell taking his place for the subsequent tour. After the tour, the band was left with no early members as Cal also quit. Wrathchild frontman Rob "Rocky Shades" Barclay briefly joined the band in his place, rehearsing for a planned run of shows. In early 1987, however, the group disbanded.

=== From 1991 ===
In 1991, Kelvin "Cal" Morris and Garry Maloney reformed Discharge, adding new guitarist Andy Green and bassist Anthony "Jake" Morgan. The new lineup issued two studio albums – Massacre Divine in 1991 and Shootin' Up the World in 1993. A second reunion followed in the summer of 2001, when the 1977–80 lineup of Cal, guitarist Tony "Bones" Roberts, bassist Roy "Rainy" Wainwright and drummer Terry "Tezz" Roberts recorded a self-titled album released the next year. Speaking about the decision to reform, Tezz explained that "The truth is, that awful metal thing Discharge turned into was a big reason for coming back. We just had to do another record, we couldn't let Discharge go down like that." In 2003, Cal was replaced by Varukers frontman Anthony "Rat" Martin, after refusing to go on tour.

Tezz left in 2006, with Dave "Proper Caution" Bridgwood taking his place in time for the recording of Disensitise. After a string of singles and EPs, including a split release with Off with Their Heads in 2011, Martin was replaced in 2014 by Broken Bones vocalist Jeff "JJ" Janiak. At the same time, bandmate Tezz returned for his third spell in Discharge, this time on guitar. In 2015, Discharge signed with Nuclear Blast, who issued the band's first studio album in eight years, End of Days, the following year.

== Members ==
=== Current ===
Image	Name	Years active	Instruments	Release contributions
	Roy "Rainy" Wainwright	1977–1987; 2001–present	bass; lead guitar (1977)	all Discharge releases from Realities of War (1980) to The Nightmare Continues... Live (1990), and from Discharge (2002) onwards
	Tony "Bones" Roberts	1977–1982; 2001–present	guitar	all Discharge releases from Realities of War (1980) to "State Violence State Control" (1982), and from Discharge (2002) onwards, except Toronto '83: In the Cold Night
	Terry "Tezz" Roberts	1977–1980; 2001–2006; 2014–present	rhythm guitar (since 2014); drums (1977–80, 2001–06); vocals (lead 1977, backing otherwise)	Realities of War (1980); Fight Back (1980); Decontrol (1980); Discharge (2002); Tour Edition 001 (2004); "Beginning of the End" (2006); Early Demo's: March–June 1977 (2008); Live 2014 (2015); End of Days (2016)
	Dave "Proper" Caution (Dave Bridgwood)	2006–present	drums	all Discharge releases from Disensitise (2008) onwards, except Toronto '83: In the Cold Night
	Jeff "JJ" Janiak	2014–present	vocals	Live 2014 (2015); New World Order (2015); End of Days (2016)

=== Former ===
Image	Name	Years active	Instruments	Release contributions
	Nigel Bamford	1977; 2001	bass	Early Demo's: March–June 1977 (2008)
	Tony "Acko" Atkinson	1977	drums	Early Demo's: March–June 1977 (2008)
	Kelvin "Cal" Morris	1977–1987; 1991–1995; 2001–2003	vocals	all Discharge releases from Realities of War (1980) to Discharge (2002); Toronto '83: In the Cold Night (2015)
	Dave "Bambi" Ellesmere	1980–1981	drums	Why (1981)
	Garry Maloney	1981–1984; 1985–1987; 1991–1995	drums	all Discharge releases from Never Again (1981) to "The More I See" (1984), and from Grave New World (1986) to Shootin' Up the World (1993); Toronto '83: In the Cold Night (2015)
	Peter "Pooch" Purtill	1982–1984	guitar	Warning: Her Majesty's Government Can Seriously Damage Your Health (1983); "The Price of Silence" (1983); "The More I See" (1984); Live at the City Gardens, New Jersey (1989); The Nightmare Continues... Live (1990); Toronto '83: In the Cold Night (2015)
	Leslie "The Mole" Hunt	1984–1985	guitar	"Ignorance" (1985)
	Micky "Heymaker" Gibson	1984–1985	drums	"Ignorance" (1985)
	Stephen "Fish" Brooks	1985–1987	guitar	Grave New World (1986)
	Nick Bushell	1986–1987	bass	none – live performances only
	Rocky Shades (Robert Barclay)	1987	vocals	none – rehearsals only
	Andy Green	1991–1995	guitar	Massacre Divine (1991); Live in Japan (1992); Shootin' Up the World (1993)
	Anthony "Jake" Morgan	1991–1995	bass	Massacre Divine (1991); Live in Japan (1992); Shootin' Up the World (1993)
	Anthony "Rat" Martin	2003–2014	vocals	all Discharge releases from Tour Edition 001 (2004) to "Legacy You Left Behind" (2011)

== Lineups ==
Period	Members	Releases
Early – mid/late 1977	Terry "Tezz" Roberts – vocals; Roy "Rainy" Wainwright – lead guitar; Tony "Bones" Roberts – rhythm guitar; Nigel Bamford – bass; Tony "Acko" Atkinson – drums	Early Demo's: March–June 1977 (2008)
Mid/late 1977 – late 1980	Kelvin "Cal" Morris – vocals; Tony "Bones" Roberts – guitar; Roy "Rainy" Wainwright – bass; Terry "Tezz" Roberts – drums	Realities of War (1980); Fight Back (1980); Decontrol (1980)
Late 1980 – spring 1981	Kelvin "Cal" Morris – vocals; Tony "Bones" Roberts – guitar; Roy "Rainy" Wainwright – bass; Dave "Bambi" Ellesmere – drums	Why (1981)
Spring 1981 – late 1982	Kelvin "Cal" Morris – vocals; Tony "Bones" Roberts – guitar; Roy "Rainy" Wainwright – bass; Garry Maloney – drums	Never Again (1981); Live at the Lyceum, 24 May 1981 (1981); Hear Nothing See Nothing Say Nothing (1982); "State Violence State Control" (1982)
Late 1982 – summer 1984	Kelvin "Cal" Morris – vocals; Peter "Pooch" Purtill – guitar; Roy "Rainy" Wainwright – bass; Garry Maloney – drums	Warning: Her Majesty's Government Can Seriously Damage Your Health (1983); "The Price of Silence" (1983); "The More I See" (1984); Live at the City Gardens, New Jersey (1989); The Nightmare Continues... Live (1990); Toronto '83: In the Cold Night (2015)
Late 1984 – summer 1985	Kelvin "Cal" Morris – vocals; Leslie "The Mole" Hunt – guitar; Roy "Rainy" Wainwright – bass; Micky "Heymaker" Gibson – drums	"Ignorance" (1985)
Late 1985 – summer 1986	Kelvin "Cal" Morris – vocals; Stephen "Fish" Brooks – guitar; Roy "Rainy" Wainwright – bass; Garry Maloney – drums	Grave New World (1986)
Summer 1986 – early 1987	Kelvin "Cal" Morris – vocals; Stephen "Fish" Brooks – guitar; Nick Bushell – bass; Garry Maloney – drums	none
Early 1987	Rocky Shades – vocals; Stephen "Fish" Brooks – guitar; Nick Bushell – bass; Garry Maloney – drums	none
Band inactive early 1987 – early 1991
Early 1991 – 1995	Kelvin "Cal" Morris – vocals; Andy Green – guitar; Anthony "Jake" Morgan – bass; Garry Maloney – drums	Massacre Divine (1991); Live in Japan (1992); Shootin' Up the World (1993)
Band inactive 1995 – 2001
Summer 2001 – 2003	Kelvin "Cal" Morris – vocals; Tony "Bones" Roberts – guitar; Roy "Rainy" Wainwright – bass; Terry "Tezz" Roberts – drums, backing vocals	Discharge (2002)
2003–2006	Anthony "Rat" Martin – vocals; Tony "Bones" Roberts – guitar; Roy "Rainy" Wainwright – bass; Terry "Tezz" Roberts – drums, backing vocals	Tour Edition 001 (2004); Beginning of the End (2006)
2006–2014	Anthony "Rat" Martin – vocals; Tony "Bones" Roberts – guitar; Roy "Rainy" Wainwright – bass; Dave "Proper" Caution – drums	Disensitise (2008); Japan 09 (2009); Propaganda Feeds (2011); "Legacy You Left Behind" (2011)
2014–present	Jeff "JJ" Janiak – vocals; Tony "Bones" Roberts – lead guitar; Terry "Tezz" Roberts – rhythm guitar, backing vocals; Roy "Rainy" Wainwright – bass; Dave "Proper" Caution – drums	Live 2014 (2015); New World Order (2015); End of Days (2016)
