= Discharge discography =

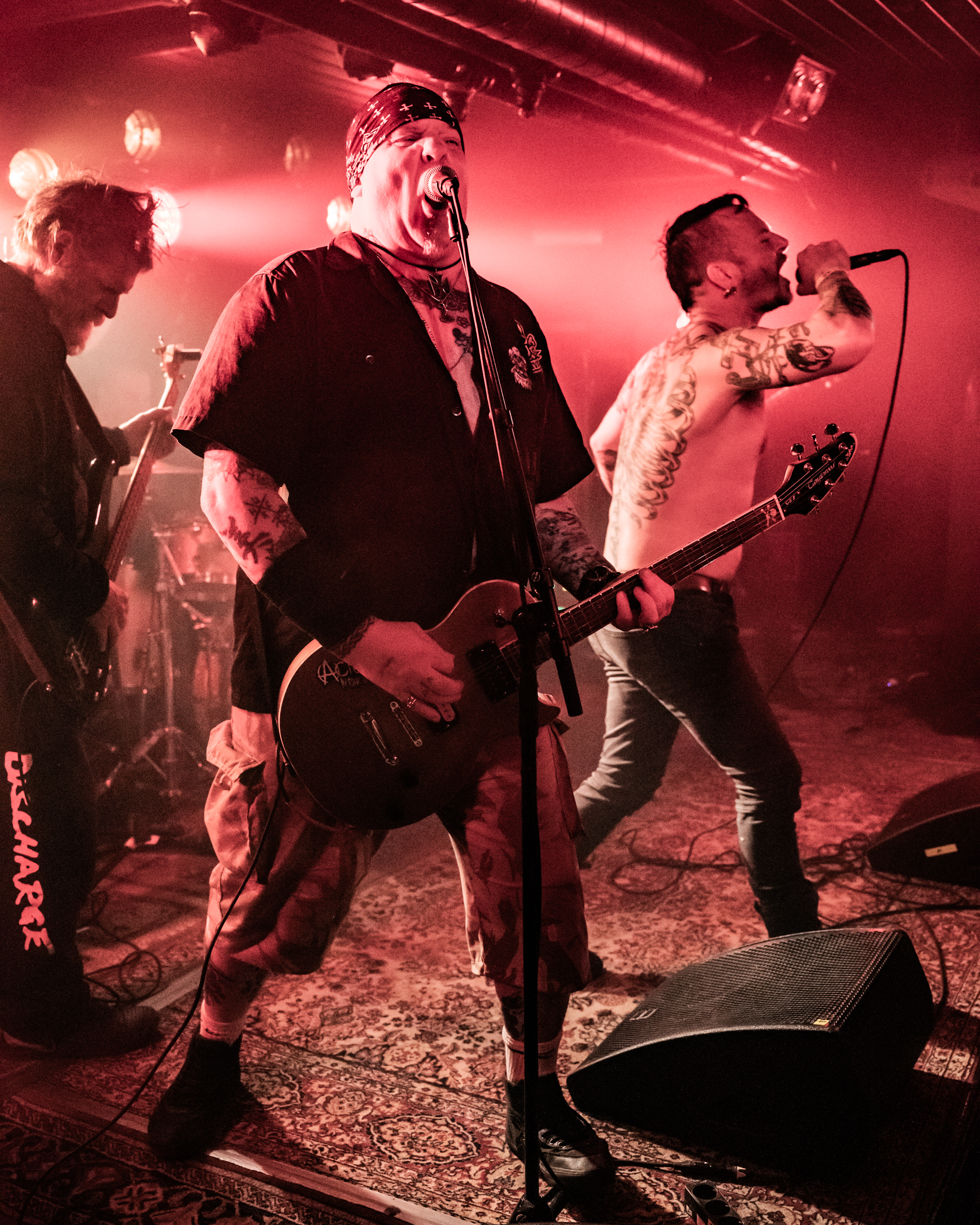
- Discharge in 2024
- Studio albums: 7
- EPs: 10
- Live albums: 5
- Compilation albums: 14
- Singles: 6
- Box sets: 3

This is the discography of British hardcore punk band Discharge.

== Albums ==
=== Studio albums ===
Title	Album details	Peak chart positions	
Title	Album details	UK	UK Indie
Hear Nothing See Nothing Say Nothing	Released: May 1982; Label: Clay; Formats: LP, MC, reel-to-reel	40	2
Grave New World	Released: June 1986; Label: Clay; Formats: LP, MC	—	8
Massacre Divine	Released: April 1991; Label: Clay; Formats: CD, LP, MC	—	—
Shootin' Up the World	Released: October 1993; Label: Clay; Formats: CD	—	—
Discharge	Released: July 2002; Label: Sanctuary; Formats: CD	—	—
Disensitise	Released: August 2008; Label: Vile; Formats: CD, digital download	—	—
End of Days	Released: 29 April 2016; Label: Nuclear Blast; Formats: CD, LP, MC, digital download	—	—
"—" denotes releases that did not chart.

=== Live albums ===
Title	Album details
Live at the Lyceum	Released: 1981; Label: Chaos Cassettes; Formats: MC; Limited release
Live at the City Garden New Jersey	Released: 1989; Label: Clay; Formats: CD, LP
The Nightmare Continues... Live	Released: 1990; Label: Clay; Formats: CD, LP, MC
Toronto '83 – In the Cold Night	Released: 9 July 2015; Label: Ugly Pop; Formats: LP; Canada-only release
Live 2014	Released: January 2015; Label: Mass Productions; Formats: CD, LP, digital download; France-only release

=== Compilation albums ===
Title	Album details	Peak chart positions
Title	Album details	UK Indie
The Price of Silence	Released: 1984; Label: Vap; Formats: LP; Japan-only release	—
Punk and Destroy	Released: 1984; Label: Vap; Formats: LP; Japan-only release	—
Never Again	Released: July 1984; Label: Clay; Formats: LP	13
1980–1986	Released: 13 July 1987; Label: Clay; Formats: CD, LP	—
Protest and Survive 1980–1984	Released: December 1992; Label: Clay; Formats: 2xCD	—
The Clay Punk Singles Collection	Released: May 1995; Label: Clay; Formats: CD	—
Vision of War	Released: 1997; Label: Recall 2cd; Formats: 2xCD	—
Hardcore Hills	Released: 11 May 1999; Label: Cleopatra; Formats: CD; US-only release	—
Free Speech for the Dumb	Released: 11 October 1999; Label: Essential; Formats: 2xCD	—
Decontrol – The Singles	Released: 11 February 2002; Label: Castle Music/Sanctuary; Formats: 2xCD, MC	—
Society's Victims	Released: October 2004; Label: Castle Music/Sanctuary; Formats: 3xCD	—
War Is Hell	Released: March 2008; Label: Unrest; Formats: CD, LP; Canada-only limited release	—
Early Demo's	Released: 19 December 2008; Label: Estado; Formats: CD; Japan-only release	—
Protest and Survive – The Anthology	Released: 21 February 2020; Label: BMG; Formats: 2xCD, LP, digital download	—
"—" denotes releases that did not chart or were not released in that territory.

=== Box sets ===
Title	Album details
Replica LP Box Set	Released: 2015; Label: Estado; Formats: 4xCD; Japan-only limited release
1980–85	Released: 12 October 2018; Label: Captain Oi!; Formats: 4xCD
Noise Not Music	Released: January 2019; Label: F.O.A.D.; Formats: 3xLP; Italy-only release

== EPs ==
Title	Album details	Peak chart positions	
Title	Album details	UK	UK Indie
Realities of War	Released: 28 March 1980; Label: Clay; Formats: 7"	—	5
Fight Back	Released: June 1980; Label: Clay; Formats: 7"	—	4
Decontrol	Released: November 1980; Label: Clay; Formats: 7"	—	2
Why	Released: April 1981; Label: Clay; Formats: 12"	—	1
Never Again	Released: 2 October 1981; Label: Clay; Formats: 7"	64	3
Warning: Her Majesty's Government Can Seriously Damage Your Health	Released: October 1983; Label: Clay; Formats: 12"	—	6
Discharge / MG15	Released: September 2005; Label: Throne; Formats: 7"; Spain-only release; Split with MG 15	—	—
Beginning of the End	Released: April 2006; Label: Thunk; Formats: 7", CD	—	—
Japan 09	Released: 2009; Label: Vile; Formats: CD; Japan-only release	—	—
New World Order	Released: 22 January 2016; Label: Nuclear Blast; Formats: 7"; Germany-only release	—	—
"—" denotes releases that did not chart or were not released in that territory.

== Singles ==
Title	Year	Peak chart positions
Title	Year	UK Indie
"State Violence State Control"	1982	4
"The Price of Silence"	1983	5
"The More I See"	1984	3
"Ignorance"	1985	7
"Propaganda Feeds" (Japan-only release)	2011	—
"Legacy You Left Behind" (split single with "Never Run" by Off with Their Heads)	2011	—
"—" denotes releases that did not chart or were not released in that territory.
