= Never Again (Discharge album) =

Compilation album by Discharge
- Released: 1984
- Genre: Hardcore punk
- Label: Clay
- Producer: Discharge

Discharge chronology
Hear Nothing, See Nothing, Say Nothing (1982)	Never Again (1984)	Grave New World (1986)

Professional ratings
Review scores
Source	Rating
AllMusic	link

Never Again is the second full-length album released by Discharge, in 1984, and is their first compilation album. It should not be confused with the EP of the same name. It includes tracks from their eponymous debut album, and from their previous extended plays. All tracks are remastered, and remixed, and is considered by Allmusic guide as "a great introduction" to the band.

The cover is a work by John Heartfield from 1932 entitled "The Meaning of Geneva, Where Capital Lives, There Can Be No Peace".

== Track listing ==
All songs written and composed by Discharge.

1. "Warning"
2. "Never Again"
3. "Hear Nothing, See Nothing, Say Nothing"
4. "The Nightmare Continues"
5. "Where There Is a Will"
6. "Drunk with Power"
7. "The Final Blood Bath"
8. "Anger Burning"
9. "Two Monstrous Nuclear Stockpiles"
10. "The Price of Silence"
11. "Protest and Survive"
12. "Born to Die in the Gutter"
13. "Doomsday"
14. "The More I See"
15. "State Violence" / "State Control"
16. "In Defence of Our Future"
17. "Decontrol"

Only included on the original 1989 uk version of the CD is an 18th track not listed on the cover, which is just an reprise of "the price of silence" titled on Discogs as "silence, silence"
