= Stakkattakktwo =

Studio album by Wrathchild
- Released: August 2011
- Genre: Heavy metal, glam metal, hard rock
- Length: 44:58
- Label: Perris Records

Wrathchild chronology
Delirium (1989)	Stakkattakktwo (2011)

Stakkattakktwo is the fourth studio album of the British glam metal band Wrathchild. It was released on October 3, 2011, via Perris Records. The name is a reference to the band's first album, Stakk Attakk (1984). It is the only Wrathchild album to feature Gaz "Psychowrath" Harris who left the band in August 2013.

== Track listing ==
All tracks are written by Angel, Star, Wrathchld, Psychowrath

No.	Title	Length
1.	"Goin' Down"	3:58
2.	"All About U"	3:36
3.	"Cherie Cherie"	3:42
4.	"Trikk or Treat"	3:49
5.	"Hollywood or Bust"	5:43
6.	"Nice 'N' Eazy"	4:09
7.	"White Hot Fever"	3:56
8.	"I'll Be Your Rokk 'N' Roll"	3:34
9.	"Bad Billy"	3:37
10.	"I Luv the Night"	3:41
11.	"Psychophantic Suicide"	4:38

== Band members ==
- Gaz "Psychowrath" Harris - Lead Vocals
- Marc Angel - Bass, Backing vocals
- Phil "Wrathchild" Vokins - Guitar, Backing vocals
- Eddie Star - Drums, Backing vocals
