= Protest and Survive =

Protest and Survive is a reference to the British government's Cold War leaflet Protect and Survive and may refer to:

- a pamphlet by E. P. Thompson in support of unilateral nuclear disarmament (1981)
- a track on the album Hear Nothing See Nothing Say Nothing by the British hardcore punk group Discharge
