= Blitzkrieg (punk band) =

English punk rock band

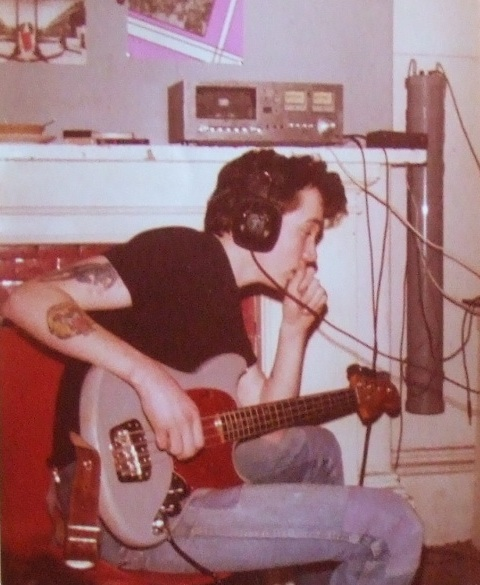
- Bassist Chris Hind in the early 1980s

Background information
- Origin: Southport, England
- Genres: Punk rock
- Years active: 1979–1984, 1991–1995, 2007–present
- Members: Chris Hind/ Gaz Johnson/ Matt Green

Blitzkrieg are an English punk rock band, based in Southport and formed in 1979. Despite the Nazi connotations of the name Blitzkrieg, German for "Lightning-War", they took an anti-Nazi stance.

== History ==
The original line-up was formed by Mike 'Riffone' on vocals together with his brother Phil 'Din' on drums in 1979, initially with Will Mawdsley on guitar and Gary 'Gaz' Sumner on bass. Tony "Toe" Fowler joined on bass, while Gaz Sumner switched over to guitar. Later when Toe Fowler left, he was replaced with Chris Hind on bass, previously of the local Southport band Mayhem.

This formed the line-up of Mike Riffone (vocals), Phil Din (drums), Gaz Sumner (guitar) and Chris Hind (bass), which was signed to the independent record label No Future Records. They released the track "The Future Must Be Ours", which appeared on the A Country Fit For Heroes compilation album, released in January 1982. The single reached No. 4 in the UK Indie Charts. Shortly after its release, Phil Din left the band and was for a brief period replaced by 'Jackanory' John McCallum on drums.

Blitzkrieg played a number of gigs, primarily in the North of England, both as headliners and as a support act to bands including UK Decay, Chron Gen, The Not Sensibles and Anti-Pasti.

Their second vinyl release, a four-track EP on No Future Records, entitled Lest We Forget, reached No. 11 in the Indie Charts in 1982. Later in the same year, the band parted company with drummer McCallum and their record label, signing to Sexual Phonograph Records, who released their Animals in Lipstick EP.

New drummer Dave "Bambi" Ellesmere, previously of the punk/speed-metal group Discharge, joined the group in mid-1982. The Animals in Lipstick EP featured an anti-vivisection theme, and their most popular recorded song to date, "Conscience Prayer", an anti-society polemic, which reached No. 30 in the Indie Chart in 1983.

Since the break-up of the group, soon after the "Conscience Prayer" release in 1983, there have since been a number of re-formations of the group, initially in late 1987 with new vocalist Spike, Gaz, Bambi & ex-Insane bassist Trev. Dave left to join Flux of Pink Indians, and has latterly enjoyed success as a Techno House DJ.

Riffone went to Blackburn and joined "Rabid Dogs" which included Gus "Popegustav" Gouldsbrough in the line-up, who later joined Blitzkrieg.

Another re-formation in 1989 combined Gaz Sumner and Martin "Ales" Walker on guitars, Freddy Doyle on drums, Mal on bass, while Spike returned to vocals. This line-up supported Discharge on a UK Tour and also toured the North of England and North Wales with Welsh punk band 4Q. In 1991, they recorded the LP Future Must Be Ours on Retch Records. A retrospective joint LP with Insane was released on Captain Oi! Records in 1997.

Blitzkrieg re-formed for the Rebellion 2007 festival at Blackpool. The new line-up was Chris Hind (original member) bass and vocals, Jax Chambers (Girlschool) lead guitar and vocals, and Tom Tom (Poor Kids with Guns) drums. A new album, Everything is Lies was released July 2008 and they played Rebellion 2008.

The line up then changed again to Chris Hind (founder member of Blitzkrieg/ ex Mayhem), Jax Chambers (Girlschool/Syteria), Gaz Johnson (ex The Nags), and Gus Goulsborough (Popegustav).

A 4 Track EP "Fear and Control" was recorded in 2011 at Riverstudios in Belgium and released on a limited edition for sale at UK and European shows.

In 2019 the band released the album Blind Faith which featured guest vocalist Jeff Janiak of Discharge on the track "Conspiracy".

During 2020 and 2021 the band recorded the album War Machine. Because of Covid restrictions, there were no rehearsals, and most tracks were recorded remotely, in Southport and Belgium. Drums by Tom Dring (Who recorded the Blind Faith album) Bass and Vocals Chris hind, and guitar backing vocals by Popegustav. John Cooke from Napalm Death features on the track Taking back Control. A reworked version of New World Order written by Jax Chambers, is also on the album. It was named Old School Punk album of the year by Vive le Rock magazine.

In July 2022 the band added a new member, guitarist Steve"Fish"Brookes taking them back to a 4-piece. Corporate Evil EP was released 2023 on Ltd edition. Steve Brookes was replaced later that year due to work commitments by Matt Green, Gus having stepped away from guitar duties due to personal reasons, Tom Dring also took a back seat due to concentrating on his new studio Arch Recordings with Gaz Johnson coming back in on drums the band are once again a 3 piece and working in 2026 on new material for a future album.

== Discography ==
=== Singles and EPs ===
- "Demo Tape 81"
- "Lest We Forget EP" - No. 11 in the UK Indie Chart
- "Practice Tape 82"
- "Animals in Lipstick EP" - No. 30 in the UK Indie Chart
- "Fear And Control EP"

Corporate Evil EP

=== Albums ===
- The Future Must Be Ours - (1991)
- Back To No Future - (2001)
- Everything is Lies - (2008)
- Blind Faith - (2019)
- War Machine - (2021)

No Compromise Vol 1981-1983 (2023)

=== Compilation appearance ===
- A Country Fit for Heroes - No Future Records 12" sampler LP featuring the track The Future Must Be Ours.
- Locked in the Dressing room Wild at Heart Punk Machine Rotator Vinyl LTD003 12" Ltd compilation featuring the track Blasphemer
- Locked in the dressing room Manx Punx Punk Machine Rotator Vinyl LTD006 12" Ltd compilation featuring the track War breeds war
