= Decontrol =

EP by Discharge
- Released: 1980
- Recorded: 1980
- Genre: Hardcore punk
- Label: Clay Records
- Producers: John Brierley, Mike Stone

Discharge chronology
| Fight Back (1980) | Decontrol (1980) | Why (1981) |

Decontrol is the third EP of the punk band Discharge. It was released on Clay Records in 1980.

== Track listing ==
All tracks written by Discharge

1. "Decontrol"
2. "It's No T.V. Sketch"
3. "Tomorrow Belongs to Us"
