= Broken Bones (band) =

English hardcore punk band

- Origin: Stoke-on-Trent, England
- Genres: Hardcore punk, UK82, crossover thrash, crust punk
- Years active: 1983–1987, 1989–1991, 1996–2010, 2012–2014
- Labels: Dr. Strange, Fall Out, Black Konflik, Heavy Metal, RFB
- Members: Jeff "JJ" Janiak; Anthony "Bones" Roberts; Terrence "Tezz" Roberts; Dave Bridgwood
- Past members: Nick "Nobby" Dobson; Paul "Oddy" Hoddy; Darren "Baz" Burgess; Quiv; Cliff; Darren "Thrasher" Harris; Kirk Douthwaite; Karl Morris; Andy Dawson

Broken Bones are an English hardcore punk band, formed in 1983 by Anthony "Bones" Roberts. He soon recruited his brother Terence "Tezz" Roberts. Bones and Tezz had previously played in the band Discharge. They took their influences from their time in Discharge as a basis for Broken Bones, but infused a faster and more "mature " influenced sound, helping evolve the genre known as crossover thrash. They have released eight albums, three EPs and a number of singles. The band has had a number of line-up changes over time and have toured internationally.

== History ==
Broken Bones are from Stoke-on-Trent, England, and were formed by guitarist Anthony "Bones" Roberts in 1983, after he left Discharge. The original line-up included Tony's twin brother Terence "Tezz" Roberts (also ex-Discharge) on bass, Nick "Nobby" Dobson on vocals and drummer Darren "Bazz" Burgress. Their first single "Decapitated" was released in January 1984, with the follow-up single "Crucifix" released in May 1984. Terry Roberts left the band to join U.K. Subs and Paul "Oddy" Hoddy replaced him on bass. This line-up signed to Fall Out Records and recorded the band's first album Dem Bones, produced by Mike Stone. They toured around Europe and North America, mostly as support.In Germany, the first two singles were gathered on the mini-album I. O. U...Nothing and released through Aggressive Rock Produktionen.

During their North American tour, the band met James Hetfield and Scott Ian at their CBGB show in New York. Upon their return to Britain, singer Nick Dobson had decided to remain in the US and Hoddy took over vocal duties, reducing the band to a trio. With this line-up the "See Through My Eyes" single was recorded, produced by Colin Jerwood. The songs were also included in the U.S.-only album Bonecrusher that was released through Combat Core Records (the rest featured on an unreleased EP). Towards the end of 1985 Hoddy left to join Conflict, and Terry Roberts resumed bass playing duties. and the F.O.A.D. album was released. Eventually the band ground to a halt.

Later, the band re-formed once more with the original line-up to record the Trader in Death EP, on the newly formed RFB recordings owned by Rab Fae Beith from UK Subs, a record the band cites as their best recording.

Bones re-formed the band with a new line-up of Cliff on drums, Quiv on vocals and Darren "Thrasher" Harris (of Exit Condition) on bass. This is where the band took a more metal turn with their music, releasing Losing Control. Two more albums were to follow with the 12-inch release "Religion Is Responsible" and another album Stitched Up. After these albums' release, the band's touring and recording fell into remission.

In 1996 Broken Bones re-formed, with Bones on guitar, Quiv on vocals, Hoddy on bass and Dave on drums. They released their first studio album in eight years, Without Conscience in 2001 and in 2004, they released Time for Anger, Not Justice. Both albums bring the band back to their roots as they play the brand of hardcore they are most well known for. They still gig and tour regularly. They were the last band to play before 2006's ill-fated British Invasion concert in San Bernardino was shut down. They played their last show with this line-up supporting the UK Subs in 2010.

In 2012 Broken Bones were to re-form again, this time with original member Tezz Roberts back on bass, Bones on lead guitar, Jeff "JJ" Janiak on vocals, Andy Dawson on drums, and also returning to the group is Karl "Egghead" Morris. Karl Morris then left and Andy left the band in 2014 which resulted in Dave Bridgewood returning to the kit. In 2013, this line up recorded the Dead & Gone EP (also known as Vigilante in the U.S.A.)

== Influence ==
Broken Bones has been cited as an influence by some of today's most prominent punk, metal and hardcore acts such as Metallica, Anthrax, Hatebreed and many more. They have also been key in the development of thrash metal (and its offshoot, crossover thrash) as bands such as Slayer have cited them as being a key influence.

== Discography ==
Chart placings shown are from the UK Indie Chart.

=== Albums ===
- Dem Bones (1984 Fall Out Records) (No. 5)
- Live at the 100 Club (1985 self-released)
- Bonecrusher (1985 Combat Core) U.S.-only release
- F.O.A.D (1987 Fall Out Records)
- Losing Control (1987 Heavy Metal Recordings)
- Stitched Up (1991 Rough Justice)
- Without Conscience (2001 Rhythm Vicar)
- Time for Anger, Not Justice (2004 Dr. Strange Records)
- Fuck You and All You Stand For (2009 Rodent Popsicle Records)

=== EPs ===
- I..O..U....Nothing (1984 AG 0035 Aggressive Rock Produktionen) Germany
- Trader in Death (1987 Heavy Metal Recordings) (No. 21)
- Dead & Gone (2015 Punkerama/Breed)

=== Singles ===
- "Decapitated" (1983 Fall Out Records) (No. 10)
- "Crucifix" (1983 Fall Out Records) (No. 12)
- "Seeing Through My Eyes" (1985 Fall Out Records) (No. 6)
- "Never Say Die" (1986 Fall Out Records) (No. 23)
- "Religion Is Responsible" (1992 Heavy Metal Records)
- "No One Survives" (2003 Dr. Strange Records)
- "Death Walks the Streets" (2009 Dr. Strange Records)
- "Vigilante" (2014 Dr. Strange Records)

=== Compilations ===
- Decapitated (1987 Fall Out Records)
- Brain Dead (1992, Rough Justice)
- Complete Singles (1996 Cleopatra Records)
- Bone Club, The Very Best Of (2010, Jungle Records)
