= The Biz Suxx =

Studio album by Wrathchild
- Released: November 1988
- Recorded: September 1988
- Studios: Sideways Studio, Birmingham, UK
- Genre: Glam metal
- Length: 38:36
- Label: Heavy Metal Records
- Producer: Guy Bidmead

Wrathchild chronology
Trash Queens (1985)	The Biz Suxx (1988)	Delirium (1989)

Singles from The Big Suxx
- 1. "(Na Na) Nuklear Rokket" Released: 1988

Professional ratings
Review scores
Source	Rating
Collector's Guide to Heavy Metal	4/10

The Biz Suxx (also known as The Biz Suxx (But We Don't Care)) is the second studio album by the British glam metal band Wrathchild, released in 1988.

The line "I look like a star but I'm still on the dole" from the title track is a reference to Mott the Hoople's song "All the Way from Memphis".

== Track listing ==
All songs written and composed by Wrathchild

1. "The Biz Suxx" – 3:26
2. "££ Millionaire $$" – 3:19
3. "Hooked" – 2:53
4. "(Na Na) Nuklear Rokket" – 3:20
5. "Wild Wild Honey" – 3:14
6. "Ring My Bell" – 3:34
7. "Hooligunz" – 3:32
8. "She'z No Angel" – 4:32
9. "O.K. U.K." – 3:24
10. "Noo Sensation" – 3:42
11. "Stikky Fingerz" – 3:40

== Personnel ==
Wrathchild

- Rocky Shades - vocals
- Lance Rocket - guitar
- Marc Angel - bass
- Eddie Starr - drums

Production

- Guy Bidmead - producer
- Alan McKerchar - engineer
