= Fight Back (Discharge EP) =

EP by Discharge
- Released: 1980
- Recorded: 1980
- Genre: Hardcore punk
- Label: Clay Records
- Producer: Mike Stone

Discharge chronology
Realities of War (1980)	Fight Back (1980)	Decontrol (1980)

Fight Back was the second 7-inch EP from hardcore punk group Discharge. It was produced by Mike Stone and was released in 1980, catalogue number Clay 3. It was rated 2.5 stars by AllMusic.

== Track listing ==
1. "Fight Back"
2. "War’s No Fairytale"
3. "Always Restrictions"
4. "You Take Part in Creating This System"
5. "Religion Instigates"
