= Jeff Janiak =

American singer-songwriter

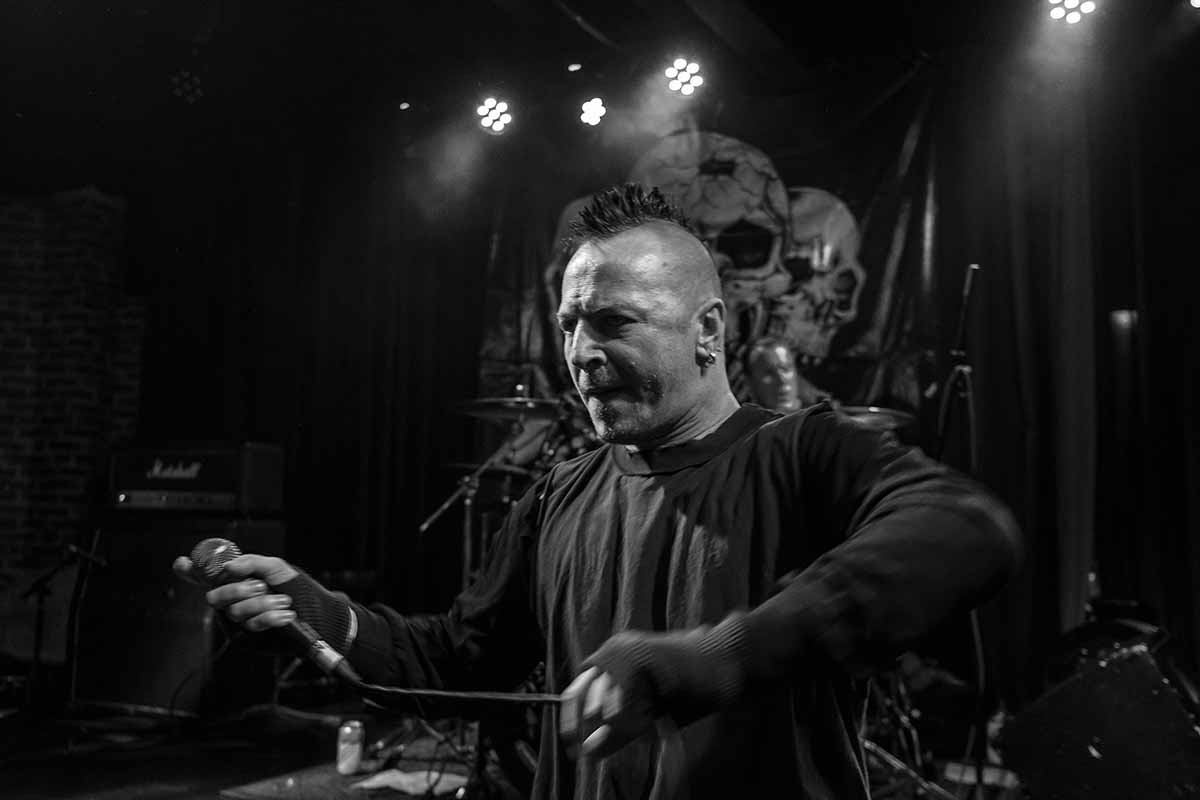
- Janiak in 2018

Background information
- Born: Jeffrey Richard Janiak; November 4, 1976 (age 49); Livingston, New Jersey, U.S.
- Genres: Heavy metal; punk rock; dark wave; gothic rock; hardcore punk; anarcho punk; thrash metal; post-punk
- Occupation: Singer
- Years active: 1989–1994; 2002–present
- Labels: Nuclear Blast; Dr. Strange; Headache; Neurot Recordings; Punkerama; F.O.A.D.; STP; Working Class; Bandworm
- Member of: Discharge; False Fed
- Formerly of: Broken Bones: Wasted Life; Dead Heros; Chaotic Discharge

Jeff "JJ" Janiak (born November 4, 1976) is an American singer and songwriter best known as the lead vocalist of hardcore punk band Discharge and darkwave band False Fed. He was also the vocalist for Broken Bones, Dead Heros and Wasted Life. Janiak has contributed to various other musical projects and has toured internationally. His vocal style has been described as shouting, harsh and guttural.

== Life and career ==
Jeff Janiak was born in Livingston, New Jersey on November 4, 1976, and spent the first years of his life in Irvington, New Jersey until moving to Toms River, New Jersey in the late 1970s. Janiak is a relative of the actor William Campbell.

Janiak started skateboarding at a young age, and eventually would start skating competitively winning numerous competitions which would land him a sponsorship. Janiak was then recruited by local pro skateboarder Jeff Jones to ride for his demo team, which would see Janiak doing skate demos around the tri-state area.

His introduction to music started when he began listening to his parents records and his mother gave him her copy of The Monster Mash. By the age of ten, Janiak was introduced to punk rock music through skateboarding, then later hearing the Dead Kennedys Plastic Surgery Disasters album which ultimately gained his attention to the genre. At the age of 13, Janiak attended his first punk rock gig watching Ramones at City Gardens in Trenton, New Jersey.

Janiak's introduction to playing music began at the age of 12 when he taught himself how to play the drums, then at the age of 14, he started his first band Chaotic Discharge. Janiak attended Toms River High School East, then at age 17 he left High School to live in Philadelphia for a short period. He briefly returned to New Jersey, only to play his final gig with Chaotic Discharge at The Stone Pony. Janiak than moved to the Lower East Side of Manhattan where he had got involved in the NYC punk and Hardcore scene. Multiple photos of Janiak began to emerge in various publications about punk rock, subculture and fashion from during his time living in New York.

After an eight-year hiatus, Janiak returned to writing and playing music. Janiak made his come back not as a drummer, but as a vocalist. He had joined the band Dead Heros in 2002. In 2003, Janiak recorded his first release with the band at Twain Studios with recording engineer Bob Both and producer Marty Munsch who would teach Janiak the basics of recording production. In 2008, Janiak left Dead Heros. He then left the US and moved to Stoke-on-Trent, England.

In 2009, he attended a local gig and met members of the punk band Wasted Life and soon joined their ranks as vocalist until 2013. In 2012, Janiak joined the punk / crossover thrash band Broken Bones, and in 2014, Janiak was recruited by punk band Discharge. In 2016, Janiak made his vocal debut with Discharge on the End of Days album which was released by Nuclear Blast Records. The album reached number 10 in the Official UK rock charts and number 23 in The Indie Charts. In October 2016, Discharge did a North American tour in support of the album.

During the corona virus pandemic in 2020, Janiak formed the Darkwave / Post-punk band False Fed and was joined by members of Amebix and Ministry. The band recorded their debut album "Let Them Eat Fake" on Neurot Recordings and it was released in October 2023.

== Influence ==
Janiak has stated that Jim Morrison of The Doors was the biggest influence on his vocal style.

== Discography ==
=== False Fed ===
Studio albums

- Let Them Eat Fake (2023)

=== Discharge ===
Studio albums

- End of Days (2016)

Singles

- New World Order (2016)

Live albums

- Live 2014 (2015)

Music videos

- New World Order (2015)
- Hatebomb (2016)
- The Broken Law (2017)

DVD

- Discharge – Legends of Punk Vol. 1 (2019)

=== Broken Bones ===
EPs

- Vigilante (2013)
- Dead & Gone (2013)

Music videos

- Tread on Me (2014)

=== Wasted Life ===
Studio albums

- Weapons of Self Destruction (2013)
- It Means Nuthin' When You're Dead (2011)

EPs

- Wasted Life (2009)
- The Zombie Sessions (2018)

Music videos

- Bad Habits (2014)
- Why Me ? (2013)

=== Dead Heros ===
Singles

- Schizophrenic (2008)
- Dead Heros (2003)

Live albums

- Live at CBGB's (2004)

Compilation

- Nothing to Lose

Demos

- 2008 Demo
- 2002 Demo "Same Story, Different Page"

=== Chaotic Discharge ===
- Demo 94 (1994) – Cassette

=== Collaborations ===
Jeff Janiak studio collaborations
Year	Song	Artist
2017	"Let's Hang"	Suspect
2019	"Alphabetty Spaghetti"	Paranoid Visions
2019	"Conspiracy"	Blitzkrieg
2020	"Free Speech for the Dumb"	Deafbrick
2020	"Deflated"	Star Control
2020	"Pharamaceutikill"	Unholy Alliance
2025	"Am I Seeing This Clearly"	Kirkby Kiss

Live

- with Cavalera Conspiracy on "Protest & Survive" and "Hear Nothing See Nothing Say Nothing" at O2 Academy 2, Birmingham, England (2019)
- with Conflict on "The Serenade Is Dead" at Rebellion Festival (2019), at The Underground, Stoke-on-Trent (2018 & 2019)
- with Blitzkrieg on "Conspiracy" at Rebellion Festival (2019)
- with The Take on "It's My Life" at Temple of Boom, Leeds (2019)
- with Vice Squad on "Last Rockers" at The Box, Crewe (2010)

=== Film and TV appearances ===
- Discharge – Legends of Punk Vol. 1 (as himself) (2019)
- Rock and Roll (episode 8 "Anger"; Sky Arts documentary) (2017)
- Rascal - Punk in Belfast. As it WAS, as it IS (documentary) (2017)
- Waxx (TV mini-series as himself; guest appearance on Ace of Spades) (2016)
- Oatcakes ! (documentary; as himself) (2014)
- Wasted Land (short film; as thug) (2012)
