= Trash Queens =

Compilation album by Wrathchild
- Released: 1985
- Genre: Glam metal
- Length: 34:00
- Label: Castle

Wrathchild chronology
| Stakk Attakk (1984) | Trash Queens (1985) | The Biz Suxx (1988) |

Professional ratings
Review scores
| Source | Rating |
|---|---|
| Collector's Guide to Heavy Metal | 4/10 |

Trash Queens is an album by Wrathchild, released in 1985. It is a compilation of the "Do You Want My Love?" single, the Stackheel Strutt EP, and three live tracks. It has never been officially re-released on CD, though there is a bootleg version with raw vinyl rip circulating.

== Track listing ==
All songs, written and composed by Wrathchild

Side one

1. "Do You Want My Love?" – 3:45
2. "Rock the City Down" – 4:35
3. "Lipstik Killers" – 3:31
4. "Trash Queen" – 4:18

Side two

1. "Teenage Revolution" – 3:42
2. "Twist of the Knife" (live) – 4:46
3. "Cock, Rock, Shock" (live) – 5:46
4. "It's Party" (live) – 3:37

== Band members ==
- Rocky Shades – vocals
- Lance Rocket – guitar
- Marc Angel – bass
- Eddie Starr – drums
