= City Gardens =

Former music venue in Trenton, New Jersey

Coordinates: 40.237483°N 74.760751°W

- Interactive map of City Gardens
- Location: 1701 Calhoun Street; Trenton, New Jersey 08638
- Owner: Frank "Tut" Nalbone
- Capacity: 1000
- Type: Nightclub, Music venue

Construction
- Opened: 1979
- Closed: 1999
- Demolished: 2026

City Gardens was a nightclub and music venue located in Trenton, New Jersey. The venue was best known for hosting the 90¢ Dance Night every Thursday and its years as a underground venue for punk rock, new wave, and hardcore music. It is remembered as one of the most influential music venues in central New Jersey. The venue stopped booking most shows in 1994 and later closed in 1999.

== History ==
=== Early years ===
The building was originally opened as a grocery store called "Giant Tiger", later becoming a car dealership called "U.S Motors" during the late 1940's to late 1960's. It additionally spent time as a bible warehouse and a furniture store called "New Furniture House" before being converted to a music venue in the mid 1970's. Originally named "Chocolate City", the "City Gardens" moniker was first used in early 1978.

=== History ===
The venue began hosting large shows in 1980. In 1981, the city of Trenton shut down the club due to code violations, requiring repairs and renovations to reopen. The venue originally only featured shows that were available for those over 18 or 21 years old, but shows began becoming all ages in 1984.

==== 90 Cent Dance Night ====
The venue was most famously known for the 90 Cent Dance Night hosted every Thursday. The event was conceived by owner Frank Nalbone and started with DJ Randy Now (Randy Ellis) in 1979.

The price of admission went up to 95 cents in 1983 and was taken over by DJ Carlos (Carlos Santos) the same year. By 1992, the admission price was raised 4% and renamed "99 Cent Dance Night". DJ Carlos was the main Thursday night and house DJ until 1993, when Now returned to DJ until he was let go.

DJ Rich O'Brien was the last regular club DJ employed by the venue, employed until the venues closure.

At the height of its popularity, the 90 Cent Dance Night regularly drew 700-1000 people weekly and often broke over 1,000 customers on the door count during the holiday seasons.

==== Closure ====
Randy Now booked his final show for City Gardens in December 1994. Due to increasing insurance premiums from violence and lawsuits from patrons, dwindling morale from both Now and Nalbone, as well as increasing demands from touring bands, the venue paused booking shows, but Now never booked another show and he was later let go in 1996. The venue continued to operate as a bar, and host dance nights and local bands. The venue closed in 1999.

=== Aftermath ===
After City Gardens closed, the building was later converted to another nightclub called Club XL, which opened in 2000 after Nalbone leased the building to new management. After a police raid investigating prostitution within the club in August 2004, Club XL closed and the building remained vacant.

In April 2013, the building was sold to Lawrence Campbell of Exodus Entertainment LLC who had hoped to turn the site into both a community center and a hall for private functions. The plan never moved forward and the city of Trenton took possession of the property in April 2016.

In August 2019, the city of Trenton announced they would be auctioning off 89 city-owned properties during the following month which included the land on which City Gardens sat on. The building was sold in July 2020 to YGI Property Management.

On June 12, 2022, a car drove into the side of the building creating a large hole in the structure which allowed for easy access for urban explorers to enter the building. The city of Trenton had the building inspected in August 2022 after the accident which showed extensive damage stating “All areas of the building are in imminent danger of further collapse." but the city was unable to demolish the building unless it became a safety risk as the building was not owned by the city.

The interior of the building was cleared out and boarded up in March 2024. On August 24, 2026, a demolition company posted on Facebook that they were awarded a contract to demolish the structure. The building was demolished on October 6, 2026.

== Notable bookings and staff ==
City Gardens hosted numerous notable musical acts and personalities throughout its history. Danzig performed their first show ever at the venue on April 9, 1988. Ween considered City Gardens their home base, having played their first "club" show there as teenagers opening for the Butthole Surfers. One of their early live performances at the venue was subsequently released on the live album The Live Brain Wedgie/WAD. The Ramones performed at City Gardens 22 times, including one of only two performances by the band featuring drummer Clem Burke of Blondie, who was billed as "Elvis Ramone". R.E.M. performed on October 2, 1982. Their song Perfect Circle, from their debut album Murmur, was inspired in part by Peter Buck sitting in the band's van outside City Gardens and watching children play football. New Jersey State Assemblyman Erik K. Simonsen also performed at the venue with his band Twelve:01.

Beyond musical performances, the venue hosted comedian Henny Youngman and speaking engagements featuring counterculture personality Timothy Leary.

Several individuals who later achieved prominence in entertainment also worked at City Gardens. Comedian and host of The Daily Show Jon Stewart worked as a bartender at the venue from 1984 to 1987. Similarly, LCD Soundsystem frontman James Murphy worked as an underage bouncer at the venue during the 1980s.

== Legacy ==
Jon Stewart stated that his tenure working at City Gardens inspired him in his future career, stating "I still think the aesthetic for the place sort of inspired you to pursue what you wanted to pursue." Explaining further on the Uproxx People's Party podcast in 2023, Stewart also stated "City Gardens was the first place that I got into that reeked of possibility."

Rollins Band live album Electro Convulsive Therapy was recorded at City Gardens. The album was released in Japan in 1993. Other live albums recorded at City Gardens include Discharge's Live At The City Garden New Jersey in 1989, The Dickies Live When They Were Five in 2014, and The Replacements Live at City Gardens 1984 in 2025.

Milo Aukerman of the Descendents filled in for All singer Chad Price during an All show at City Gardens on October 24, 1993. Aukerman credits this show as what inspired him to continue performing and eventually reunite with the Descendents, stating "If [Bill] hadn't called me and set this show up, we might of not gotten back together in 1996."

Tim Hinely writing for the Go Metric! zine stated "every punk band who is a punk band played there," naming his favorite performances as Circle Jerks, Agnostic Front, Murphys Law, Butthole Surfers, Sonic Youth, Mod Fun, Gwar, Descendents and Ween, among others.

== Media ==
In 2014, authors Amy Yates Wuelfing and Steven DiLodovico published a book on the City Gardens scene, No Slam Dancing, No Stage Diving, No Spikes: An Oral History of New Jersey's Legendary City Gardens featuring a chronological timeline of every concert at the venue from 1979 to 1994 with commentary from band members, former employees of the venue, and historians.

That same year, director Steve Tozzi released his documentary, Riot on the Dance Floor, based on Randy Now and City Gardens.
