= Demon (band) =

English heavy metal band

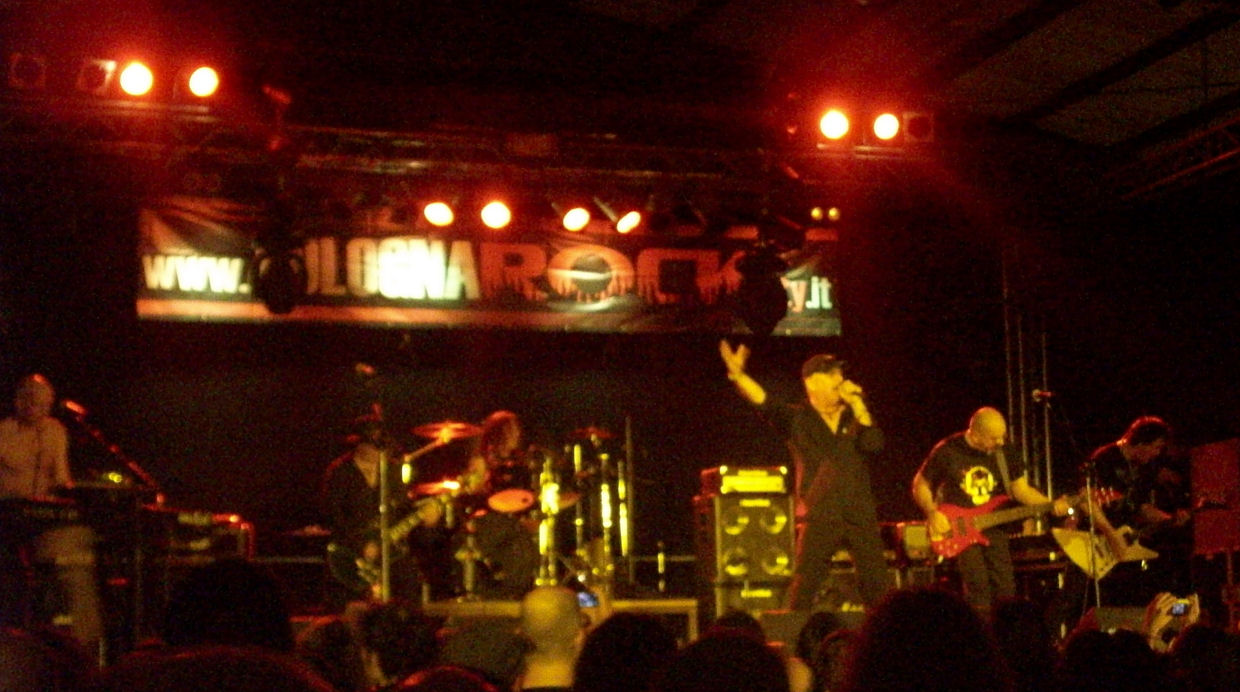
- Demon performing in 2010

Background information
- Origin: Leek, Staffordshire, England
- Genres: Heavy metal; hard rock; progressive rock
- Years active: 1979–1992, 1997–present
- Labels: Clay, Carrere
- Members: Dave Hill; Paul Hume; David Cotterill; Paul 'Fasker' Johnson; Neil Ogden; Rick Benton
- Website: demon.band

Demon is an English hard rock/heavy metal band with progressive rock elements, formed in 1979 by vocalist Dave Hill and guitarist Mal Spooner, both hailing from Leek, Staffordshire. The band is considered important to the new wave of British heavy metal movement.

== History ==
=== Early years ===
The original lineup was completed by former Hunter members Les Hunt (lead guitar), Chris Ellis (bass), and John Wright (drums). The band were signed by Mike Stone's Clay Records in 1980 and licensed to Carrere Records to join their stable of metal bands. Their debut album, Night of the Demon, was released in 1981.

After their 1982 follow-up album, The Unexpected Guest, the band experimented beyond the NWOBHM sound and moved the band in a more melodic direction whilst still retaining the more traditional heavy metal black magic lyrical style.

In 1983, Demon took a change in direction. The Plague marked a swing towards a more progressive sound, adding the keyboards of session musician Andy Richards to the album's sound. Lyrically the band also changed direction, switching to a more overtly political style that was to characterise their albums for the rest of their career.

The following album, Pink Floyd influenced British Standard Approved (1985), released on the small independent Clay label, was not a huge commercial success, and with the death of Mal Spooner later that year, it appeared that the band would soon fold. At this point, the band had recruited a permanent keyboard player and co-songwriter in Steven Watts.

=== 1985–1992 ===
The following release Heart of Our Time (1985) showed that the remaining members of the band were determined to continue, and it was the start of a new songwriting partnership between Hill and Watts. Although the album is regarded as the weakest of the band's releases, it paved the way for the critically acclaimed Breakout (1987) and its follow-up Taking the World by Storm (1989). Demon released two more albums in the 1990s: 1991's Hold On to the Dream and 1992's Blow Out, before splitting up in 1992 which, according to singer and founding member Dave Hill, was because of fatigue.

=== Reunion (2001–present) ===
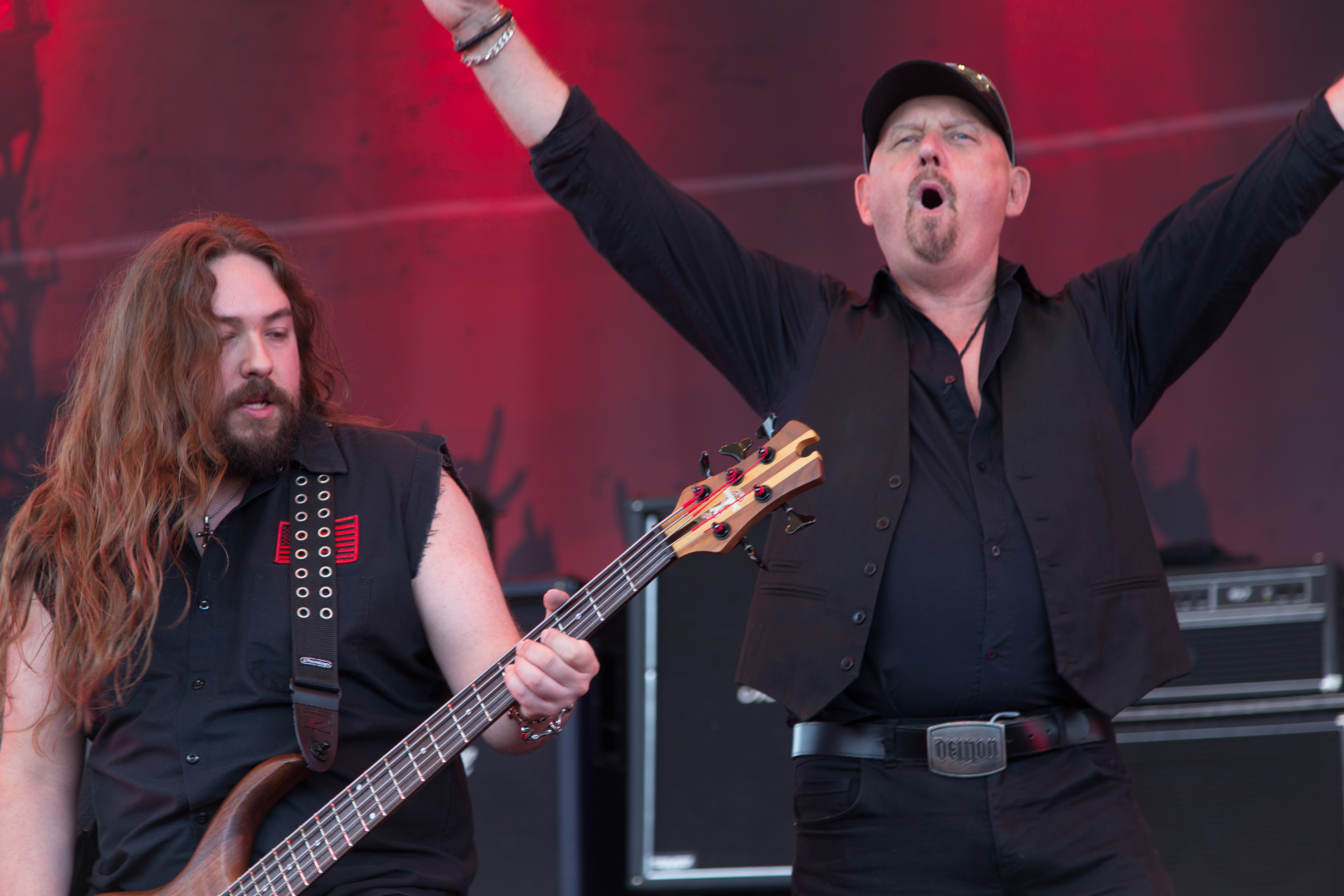
Demon at the Rock Hard festival in Germany, 2017

Hill reunited the band with new members in 2001, and released a new album called Spaced Out Monkey. The band has since gone onto release a further three albums: Better the Devil You Know (2005), Unbroken (2012) and Cemetery Junction, which was released on 28 October 2016.

All of the band's post-reunion releases have received positive reviews from the press, leading the band to go on and play many festivals across Europe - including the Bang Your Head!!! festival and Sweden Rock Festival - but infrequently embark upon full tours. The band toured with Magnum singer Bob Catley in 2005, and in 2018 celebrated the 35th anniversary of The Unexpected Guest by touring the UK, playing all of the songs from the album, plus some other classics.

On 26 March 2024, the band announced a new album: Invincible, which was released on 17 May, again receiving favourable reviews.

Former guitarist John Waterhouse died on 12 October 2025, at the age of 75.

== Members ==
=== Current ===
- Dave Hill – lead vocals (1979–1992, 1997–present)
- Neil Ogden – drums, percussion (2002–present)
- David Cotterill – guitars (2007–present)
- Paul 'Fasker' Johnson – bass (2011–2012, 2022–present)
- Paul Hume – guitars (2012–present)
- Rick Benton – keyboards (2024–present)

=== Former ===
- Paul Riley – bass (1979–1980)
- John Wright – drums, percussion (1979–1987)
- Clive Cook – guitars (1979–1980)
- Mal Spooner – guitars (1979–1984; died 1984)
- Les Hunt – guitars (1981–1983), bass (1981)
- Chris Ellis – bass (1982–1983; died 2022)
- Gavin Sutherland – bass (1984–1985)
- Steve Watts – keyboards (1984–1991)
- John Waterhouse – guitars (1985–1992; died 2025)
- Andy Dale – bass (1987–1988, 1997–2011)
- Nick Bushell – bass (1988–1991)
- Scott Crawford – drums (1988–1991)
- Steve Brookes – guitars (1988–1992, 1997–2001)
- Mike Thomas – bass (1992)
- Paul Rosscrow – drums, percussion (1992)
- Ray Walmsley – guitars (1997–2011), bass (2012–2022)
- John Cotterill – drums, percussion (1997–2001)
- Duncan Hansell – keyboards (1997–2001)
- Paul Farrington – keyboards (2002–2012)
- Karl Finney – guitars (2003–2005)
- Tim Read – guitars (2005–2007)
- Karl Waye – keyboards (2001, 2012–2024)

== Discography ==
=== Studio albums ===
- Night of the Demon (1981)
- The Unexpected Guest (1982) – UK No. 47
- The Plague (1983) – UK No. 73
- British Standard Approved (1985)
- Heart of Our Time (1985)
- Breakout (1987)
- Taking the World By Storm (1989)
- Hold On to the Dream (1991)
- Blow-out (1992)
- Spaced out Monkey (2001)
- Better the Devil You Know (2005)
- Unbroken (2012)
- Cemetery Junction (2016)
- Invincible (2024)

=== EP ===
- Wonderland (1984)
- Demon (1986)

=== Live albums / compilations ===
- One Helluva Night - Live in Germany (1990)
- Anthology (1991)
- The Best of Demon: Volume One (1999)
- The Time Has Come – Best of Demon (2006)

=== Videos ===
- Live In Hamburg (VHS only) (1993)
- The Unexpected Guest Tour – Live at Tiffany's 1982 (2008)
- Up Close and Personal! Live in Germany 2006 (2009)

=== Dave Hill solo album ===
- Welcome To The Real World (1994)

== See also ==
- List of new wave of British heavy metal bands
