= Dave Ellesmere =

Dave Ellesmere (born 3 August 1962) is an English rock musician and later electronic DJ, born in Southport, England, who played drums during the 1980s in UK punk bands such as The Insane, Discharge, Flux of Pink Indians and Doctor and the Crippens, as well as guitar in Disgust. He has also drummed with Gaz Sumner in Hylas and the Nymphs.

== Career ==
In the late 1970s, he played drums with The Insane, a UK punk band formed in Wigan. In the 1980s, he played in several UK 82-style groups. After Discharge founding member Terry Roberts (drums) departed (later joining UK Subs) Ellesmere took the drum chair for the Why EP, a recording which gave the band their first number one on the UK Indie Chart. Ellesmere did not stay long, and the band replaced him with Gary Maloney.

Shortly after he recorded an album as a guitarist for the Earache imprint, Ellesmere became immersed in the electronic genre.
