= Massacre Divine =

Studio album by Discharge
- Released: 1991
- Recorded: 1991
- Genre: Heavy metal
- Length: 41:04
- Label: Clay
- Producer: Discharge

Discharge chronology
Grave New World (1986)	Massacre Divine (1991)	Shootin' Up the World (1993)

Professional ratings
Review scores
Source	Rating
AllMusic	1.5/5 stars

Massacre Divine is the third studio album by English hardcore punk band Discharge released in 1991 through Clay Records.

== Track listing ==
1. "City of Fear" - 3:11
2. "F.E.D." - 2:34
3. "Lost Tribe Rising" - 3:02
4. "Challenge Terror" - 3:31
5. "White Knuckle Ride" - 2:25
6. "New Age" - 3:39
7. "Terror Police" - 2:34
8. "Kiss Tomorrow Goodbye" - 2:30
9. "Sexplosion" - 2:56
10. "Dying Time" - 2:23
11. "E# 2. 30" - 1:45
12. "F.E.D. (F2 mix)" - 5:04
13. "Terror Police (F2 mix)" - 5:30
