= Why (Discharge EP) =

EP by Discharge
- Released: April 1981
- Recorded: 1981
- Studio: The Grove, London
- Genre: Hardcore punk
- Length: 14:43
- Label: Clay Records
- Producer: Mike Stone

Discharge chronology
Decontrol (1980)	Why (1981)	Never Again (1981)

Professional ratings
Review scores
Source	Rating
AllMusic	4/5 stars
Punknews	5/5 stars
Sounds	5/5 stars

Why is the fourth EP by English hardcore punk band Discharge, released in 1981 on Clay Records. It reached number 1 on the UK Indie Charts in 1981. It was reissued in 2003 with 12 bonus tracks, in addition to the 10 tracks from the 1981 EP. The reissue EP is 31:52 in length.

== Track listing ==
All tracks written by Discharge

No.	Title	Length
1.	"Visions of War"	1:41
2.	"Does This System Work?"	1:17
3.	"A Look at Tomorrow"	1:57
4.	"Why"	1:11
5.	"Maimed and Slaughtered"	1:06
6.	"Mania for Conquest"	1:16
7.	"Ain't No Feeble Bastard"	1:30
8.	"Is This to Be?"	1:31
9.	"Massacre of Innocents (Air Attack)"	1:23
10.	"Why (Reprise)"	1:49

=== CD reissue bonus tracks ===
1. "Realities of War"
2. "They Declare It"
3. "But After the Gig"
4. "Society's Victim"
5. "Fight Back"
6. "War's No Fairytale"
7. "Always Restrictions"
8. "You Take Part in Creating This System"
9. "Religion Instigates"
10. "Decontrol"
11. "It's No T.V. Sketch"
12. "Tomorrow Belongs to Us"
