= Stakk Attakk =

Studio album by Wrathchild
- Released: 30 June 1984
- Recorded: DJM Studio, London, 1984
- Genres: Heavy metal, glam metal
- Length: 40:19
- Label: Heavy Metal Records
- Producer: Robin George

Wrathchild chronology
| Stakk Attakk (1984) | Trash Queens (1985) |

Singles from Stakk Attakk
- 1. "Alrite with the Boyz" / "Sweet Surrender" Released: 1984; 2. "Stakk Attack" / "Trash Queen" Released: 1985

Professional ratings
Review scores
| Source | Rating |
|---|---|
| Collector's Guide to Heavy Metal | 4/10 |

Stakk Attakk is the debut album by the British glam metal band Wrathchild, released in June 1984.

Recorded at DJM Studio in London and mastered at Abbey Road, the album was engineered by Murray Harris and produced by former Magnum guitarist Robin George, in addition to him contributing guitar work, drum programming and background vocals.

The lead single from the album was "Alrite with the Boyz", a cover of Gary Glitter's 1975 single "Doing Alright with the Boys".

== Track listing ==
All songs written and composed by Wrathchild, except where indicated.

Side one

1. "Stakk Attakk" – 4:32
2. "Too Wild to Tame" – 3:18
3. "Trash Queen" – 3:13
4. "Shokker" – 4:07
5. "Kick Down the Walls" – 4:05

Side two

1. "Alrite with the Boyz" (Gary Glitter, Mike Leander) – 3:39
2. "Sweet Surrender" – 4:09
3. "Law Abuzer" – 4:11
4. "Tonite" – 4:16
5. "Wreckless" – 4:49

== Personnel ==
Wrathchild

- Rocky Shades – vocals
- Lance Rocket – guitar
- Marc Angel – bass
- Eddie Starr – drums

Additional musicians

- Robin George – guitar synthesizer, drum programming, backing vocals

Production

- Robin George – producer
- Mark Fishlock, Murray Harris – engineers
