= San Bernardino punk riot =

2006 riot in San Bernardino, California

2006 San Bernardino punk rock festival riot
- Part of A man stabbed
- Date: March 4, 2006
- Location: San Bernardino, California, U.S.
- Methods: Rioting, vandalism, assault

Casualties and losses
- 2 concert-goers injured, 4 police officers injured

The San Bernardino punk riot occurred on March 4, 2006, after a punk rock festival titled "The British Invasion 2k6" with bands like Goldblade in San Bernardino, California, United States was shut down early due to the stabbing of a concert-goer. The disturbance that led to the stabbing was reportedly caused by a group of skinheads shouting racist remarks at concert-goers.

== Rioting ==
The riot took place after there was a skinhead fight outside between antiracist skinheads and neo-Nazi skinheads. One of the neo-Nazis who had enter the venue after the fight was still angry. As he ranted, people started to argue with him. As tensions rose, security separated him from the crowd and put him behind a small fence.

However, the arguing continued, and eventually the attendees overpowered security and rushed through the fence. The crowd started beating the neo-Nazi and it was at this point that he was stabbed. The police, in an attempt to disperse the agitated crowd, used tear gas, releasing it not only at the site of the disturbance but also inside the venue itself where no disturbance had occurred, catching many concert-goers unaware.

Some attendees became angry and destroyed several police cars outside the venue. Helicopters and riot police were called in and the crowd moved out of the parking lot and into the streets of San Bernardino. Rioters jumped on police cars and broke headlights, and one police car was flipped over.

The estimated crowd of 1,500 began to vandalize local businesses and parked cars in the downtown area. Dumpsters were set on fire and several shops were broken into while dozens more were damaged. Many attendees who were driven to the event by parents were unable to disperse as demanded by the police and were subsequently forced into the surrounding neighborhoods.

== Response ==
Nearly 200 members of the police force were called in to quell the riot, which lasted several hours. At least four officers were injured and two concert-goers were hospitalized, including the stabbing victim. The police made over a dozen arrests, and the riot caused an estimated $500,000 in damages.
