= Never Again (Discharge EP) =

EP by Discharge
- Released: 1981
- Recorded: 1981
- Genre: Hardcore punk
- Length: 5:17
- Label: Clay Records
- Producer: Mike Stone

Discharge chronology
Why (1981)	Never Again (1981)	Hear Nothing See Nothing Say Nothing (1982)

Professional ratings
Review scores
Source	Rating
AllMusic	2/5 stars

Never Again is the fifth EP by English hardcore punk band Discharge. It was released in 1981.

The cover features an infamous photograph of a dove impaled on a dagger. It is a 1932 work by John Heartfield titled "The Meaning of Geneva, Where Capital Lives, There Can Be No Peace".

== Track listing ==
All tracks written by Discharge

1. "Never Again" - 2:23
2. "Death Dealers" - 1:44
3. "Two Monstrous Nuclear Stockpiles" - 1:09

== Personnel ==
Discharge

- Kelvin "Cal" Morris - vocals, sleeve design
- Anthoney "Bones" Roberts - guitar
- Roy "Rainy" Wainright - bass
- Garry "Gary" Maloney - drums
