= Wrathchild =

British glam metal band

- Origin: Evesham, Worcestershire, England
- Genre: Heavy metal
- Years active: 1980–1990, 2005–2013, 2023–Present
- Labels: Bullet, Heavy Metal Records, Perris Records
- Members: Rocky Shades; Oz Paul; Jonny Suicide; Gaz Wilde; Jay Pegg
- Website: Official website

Wrathchild (sometimes known as Wrathchild UK in the United States due to a naming conflict with Wrathchild America) are an English glam metal band. Formed in 1980, the group was an early exponent of the glam metal genre, founded at about the same time as US bands of the genre such as Mötley Crüe.

In their home country, the band's speciality was in its D.I.Y. aesthetic (common for many NWOBHM bands), over-the-top stage shows and striking imagery. During their early days, they would often play in pubs but still use confetti and pyrotechnics, whilst dressed in full glam metal gear, including their trademark platform boots and huge, teased hair.

From 2005 to 2009 they toured under the name Psychowrath before reverting back to Wrathchild in 2009 and more recently under the name Wrathchild Feat. Rocky Shades from 2023 onwards.

The band has gone through several line-up changes over the years, internal conflict between current and former member's and several band name incarnations, with line-up number three - consisting of Rocky Shades, Lance Rocket, Marc Angel and Eddie Starr - considered the 'classic' line-up of the band. Up until 2023, bass player Marc Angel was the only member to consistently feature in every line-up of the band. From 2023 onwards, the band's line-up featured original vocalist Rocky Shades alongside four new bandmembers. Previously from 2005 to 2009 the mark 4 line up of the band went under the name "Psychowrath", whilst Rocky Shades fronted "Rocky Shades Wrathchild"

== History ==
Wrathchild was formed in October 1980 in Evesham, Worcestershire, by Marc Angel and Philip Vokins (who were both formerly in a band called Sinner). They recruited Robert Barclay - known as Rocky Shades - for lead vocals, with Brian Parry on drums. Phil Vokins left in 1981 to join Bill Ward (ex-Black Sabbath) in America with his new band, Max Havoc. Brian Parry also departed at around the same time. Vokins went on to be a member of Tyrant (1984-1985 and 2014-present) and Persian Risk (1985-1986).

Prior to the band's third and most well-known line-up, the band recruited Kevin Kozak on guitar for a short time in 1982, although this was only a temporary measure until a permanent guitar player had been hired.

The band added two members from Medusa (which had also featured Steve Grimmett on vocals): guitarist Lance Rocket and drummer Eddie Starr, who became mainstays in the band and completed the line-up for a decade of touring and recording.

After releasing a string of demos, such as Classical Mayhem / Mascara Massacre in 1982, the band was offered a record deal by Bullet Records. On this label the group put out their first official release in 1983: an EP called Stackheel Strutt. In 1984, the band recorded and released their debut studio album, Stakk Attakk. It would spawn two singles: a cover version of the Gary Glitter song, "Doing Alright with the Boys" and an original composition, "Trash Queen".

Just as Wrathchild became moderately successful, they became embroiled in contractual problems with their label, Heavy Metal Records. RCA Records, a major label, unsuccessfully attempted to sign the band from Heavy Metal Records in an effort to free them from their contract. Meanwhile, in 1984 the group released a video compilation called War Machine.

After settling the dispute with Heavy Metal Records, in 1988 (nearly four years later) the band released their second album, The Biz Suxx. This album spawned a single, "Nukklear Rokket", which had a promotional video that was produced by Bruce Dickinson of Iron Maiden. Dickinson played a protester in the video, whilst the performance was filmed in a car park near his home in Chiswick. Ron Kennedy directed and edited the video, as well as appearing in it as a mad professor. Steve Prior was the cameraman.

The band's third studio album, Delirium, was released shortly afterwards, in 1989. It featured Grim Reaper's Steve Grimmett on backing vocals. Soon after the release, Rocky Shades left to join the punk band Discharge and with the onset of grunge, Wrathchild broke up in 1991. A fourth studio album had been planned prior to the band breaking up, but this ultimately fell through.

=== Post-split activities ===
In the 1990s and early 2000s, several members of Wrathchild continued to perform in various bands. Marc Angel played bass in an underground alternative rock band called Bang Bang Machine, whilst Rocky Shades performed with a Blues Brothers tribute band, and then fronted The Handsome Beasts (between 2007 and 2013).

A Wrathchild reunion began to be arranged in 2005. Although the other bandmembers initially had plans to reunite with Rocky Shades, this led to a few rehearsals, but he had pre-existing tour commitments with his tribute band, "The Birmingham Blues Brothers", so he was obliged to put any involvement in a Wrathchild reunion on hold. A new singer was therefore recruited in his stead.

=== Wrathchild and Psychowrath 2005-2013 ===
In 2005, Marc Angel, Eddie Starr and Phil Vokins started a band called "Psychowrath", featuring new singer Gaz Harris (ex-Beyond Recognition). In 2009, they acquired the trademarks for the names Wrathchild and Wrathchild UK. The band reverted to using the name "Wrathchild" and on 23 August 2011 they released an album entitled Stakkattakktwo on the Perris Records label.

Marc Angel explained in an interview in 2012 how important the name "Wrathchild" was for the band: "I spent my entire youth putting together and propagating the band known the world over as the mighty Wrathchild. Wrathchild as a collective is unique; we forged an entire new glam metal scene borne on mine and Eddie (Starr)'s punk roots".

Stakkattakktwo was voted the Best Album of 2011, both by Grande-Rock.com journalists and in the website's Readers' Poll.

In August 2013, Gaz Harris and Wrathchild parted ways. Harris went on to join Gypsy Pistoleros then Psycho Dollz, and this once again led to Wrathchild splitting up.

=== Rocky Shades' Wrathchild ===
"Rocky Shades' Wrathchild" (also known as "R.S.W.") was founded by former lead vocalist Rocky Shades in 2006. They recorded a demo called Dead Good, which was featured on their Myspace website for a short time. At this point, the band's line-up included guitarist Clem Dallaway. The next R.S.W. featured Rocky Shades, Jon Sudbury and James Crofts. They were set to play at the Hard Rock Hell III festival in December 2009, but were removed from the bill in October; the reason for this was quoted by the Hard Rock Hell promoters as follows: "All involved in Hard Rock Hell felt that without being able to use the name to advertise, and without more than one member of the original line-up in the band, what we were left with was simply not what we booked. It's as if we had booked Genesis and got Phil Collins. Hence it was not a proper booking, to which the agent who booked it agreed."

=== Wildside Riot ===
In December 2010, Rocky Shades decided to start afresh by creating a new band with no relation to the Wrathchild name, entitled "Wildside Riot". The band's initial line-up was Rocky Shades on vocals, Gaz Wilde (Gary Hunt) on drums, Iggie Pistolero (Craig Smith) and Rob D'Var on guitar. Nat Kidd initially took on bass duties, but was subsequently replaced by James Crofts (formerly of R.S.W.) The next line-up featured Shades and Wilde, with Joss Riot and Jimmy Gunn on guitars, and Marty Mayhem on bass.

Wildside Riot was launched in July 2011, and the band played a handful of live dates in the UK between May and July 2012. Their debut album No Second Take was released on 28 January 2013, on CD and as a digital download. The band released a video to accompany their self-titled track "Wildside Riot", ahead of the album's release. Amongst other live dates during 2012 and early 2013, they secured a Saturday slot at the Hard Rock Hell VI festival in December 2012.

=== Wrathchild featuring Rocky Shades, Still Here In The Freakshow and Future Bomb (since 2023) ===
In late 2019, Rocky Shades began performing again under the "Rocky Shades' Wrathchild" name.

In March 2023, it was announced (after years of battling over the Wrathchild name between current and former Wrathchild bandmembers) that the name "Wrathchild" was being returned to the custodianship of Rocky Shades. In an official statement, it was declared that: "Rocky Shades' Wrathchild will now officially be known as Wrathchild, since the ownership of the much-disputed and controversial trademark and legacy has been returned to its co-creator and motormouth frontman, Rocky Shades. The new Wrathchild is the five-piece band that it should have been since day one, and is considerably heavier than its older incarnation. The original members have either retired or turned their backs on the genre..." This is the first time that the band had performed with a five-piece line-up.

As of 2023, the band were working on new material, including a new single, "Freakshow" and a planned re-recording of the song "Trash Queen". This would be the first time that vocalist Rocky Shades had performed on a Wrathchild release since the band's 1989 studio album Delirium. On 27 July 2023, the track "Still Here In The Freakshow" was debuted on Hard Rock Hell Radio.

As of 2025, a 4-track EP called Still Here in the Freakshow was being recorded at Abatis Recording Studio in Honiley, with Jon Priestley of The Godfathers as producer. On September 8 2025 the band announced via their Facebook page their fifth studio album Future Bomb, with no official release date other than it is expected for release in 2026

== Members ==
=== Current members ===
- Rocky Shades (Rob Barclay) - vocals (1980-1990, 2023–present)
- Oz Paul - guitars (2023–present)
- Jonny Suicide - bass (2023–present)
- Gaz Wilde (Gary Hunt) - drums (2023–present)
- Jay Pegg - guitars (2024–present)

=== Past members ===
- Brian "Thunderburst" Parry - drums (1980-1981)
- Phil Wrathchild (Phil Vokins) - guitars, backing vocals (1980-1981, 2005–2013)
- Kevin Kozak (Kevin Hunt) - guitars (1982)
- Marc Angel (Stanley Wood) - bass, backing vocals (1980-1990, 2005–2013)
- Lance Rocket (Lance Perkins) - guitars, backing vocals (1982-1990)
- Eddie Starr (Edward Smith) - drums (1981-1990, 2005–2013)
- Gaz Psychowrath (Gary Harris) - vocals (2005-2013)
- Bret Patrucci - guitars (2023–2024)

=== Line-ups ===
Line-Up No. 1 (1980-1981)	Rocky Shades - vocals; Phil Wrathchild - guitars; Marc Angel - bass; Brian Parry - drums
Line-Up No. 2 (1982)	Rocky Shades - vocals; Kevin Kozak - guitars; Marc Angel - bass; Eddie Starr - drums
Line-Up No. 3 (1982-1990)	Rocky Shades - vocals; Lance Rocket - guitars; Marc Angel - bass; Eddie Starr - drums
Line-Up No. 4 (2005-2013)	Gaz Psychowrath - vocals; Phil Wrathchild - guitars; Marc Angel - bass; Eddie Starr - drums
Line-Up No. 5 (2023-2024)	Rocky Shades - vocals; Oz Paul - guitars; Bret Patrucci - guitars; Jonny Suicide - bass; Gaz Wilde - drums
Line-Up No. 6 (2024-present)	Rocky Shades - vocals; Oz Paul - guitars; Jay Pegg - guitars; Jonny Suicide - bass; Gaz Wilde - drums

== Discography ==
=== Albums ===
- Stakk Attakk (1984)
- The Biz Suxx (1988)
- Delirium (1989)
- Stakkattakktwo (2011)
- Future Bomb (2026)

=== EPs ===
- Stackheel Strutt (1983)
- Still Here in the Freakshow (2025)

=== Compilation Albums ===
- Trash Queens (1985)

=== Singles ===
- "Do You Want My Love?" (1982)
- "Alrite with the Boyz" (1984)
- "Trash Queen" (1984)
- "Nukklear Rokket" (1988)
- "Still Here In The Freakshow" (2023)

=== Demos ===
- Mascara Massacre (1982)

=== Video albums ===
- Live in London / War Machine (1984)

== See also ==
- List of new wave of British heavy metal bands
- List of glam metal bands and artists
