= Warning: Her Majesty's Government Can Seriously Damage Your Health =

1983 extended play by Discharge

EP by Discharge
- Released: 1983
- Recorded: 1983
- Genre: Heavy metal
- Label: Clay Records
- Producer: Mike Stone

Discharge chronology
Hear Nothing See Nothing Say Nothing (1982)	Warning: Her Majesty's Government Can Seriously Damage Your Health (1983)	Never Again (1984)

Warning: Her Majesty's Government Can Seriously Damage Your Health is the sixth EP by hardcore punk band Discharge, released in 1983 by Clay Records.

== Track listing ==
1. "Warning"
2. "Where There Is a Will There Is a Way"
3. "In Defense of Our Future"
4. "Anger Burning"
