= Shootin' Up the World =

Studio album by Discharge
- Released: 1993
- Recorded: 1993
- Genre: Thrash metal
- Length: 32:00
- Label: Clay
- Producer: Discharge, Pete Coleman

Discharge chronology
Massacre Divine (1991)	Shootin' Up the World (1993)	Discharge (2001)

Professional ratings
Review scores
Source	Rating
AllMusic	2.5/5 stars

Shootin' Up the World is the fourth album by English hardcore punk band Discharge, released in 1993 through Clay Records.

== Track listing ==
1. "Manson Child" (6:08)
2. "Lost in You" (2:44)
3. "Shootin Up the World" (2:34)
4. "Psycho Active" (2:28)
5. "Leaders Deceivers" (2:32)
6. "Fantasy Overload" (2:49)
7. "Down and Dirty" (2:46)
8. "Never Come to Care" (2:39)
9. "Real Live Snuff" (2:41)
10. "Exiled in Hell" (2:49)
11. "Reprise" (1:50)
