= Discharge (album) =

Studio album by Discharge
- Released: 2002
- Genres: Hardcore punk, grindcore
- Length: 32:25
- Label: Sanctuary
- Producer: Discharge

Discharge chronology
Shootin' Up the World (1993)	Discharge (2002)	Disensitise (2008)

Professional ratings
Review scores
Source	Rating
AllMusic	3/5 stars

Discharge is a studio album by the English hardcore punk band Discharge, released in 2002 on Sanctuary Records. It is the final album with singer Cal Morris.

== Track listing ==
1. "You Deserve Me" (1:55)
2. "Almost Alive" (2:15)
3. "Corpse of Decadence" (2:19)
4. "Trust 'Em" (1:49)
5. "M.A.D" (1:52)
6. "Accessories by Molotov" (2:20)
7. "Into Darkness" (2:02)
8. "Hype Overload" (2:48)
9. "You" (2:39)
10. "What Do I Get" (2:24)
11. "Hell Is War" (1:42)
12. "Accessories by Molotov Remix" (3:24)
13. "Corpse of Decadence Remix" (3:29)

== Personnel ==
- Vocals: Cal
- Guitar: Bones
- Bass: Rainy
- Drums/backing vocals: Tez
- Mixing: Pete Coleman
- Engineering: Pete Coleman
- Asst. engineering: Martin Wilding
- Mastering: Blackham
