= End of Days (Discharge album) =

Studio album by Discharge
- Released: 29 April 2016
- Recorded: 2015
- Studio: Tremolo Studios
- Genres: Hardcore punk; D-beat
- Length: 33:40
- Label: Nuclear Blast
- Producer: Peter Tägtgren

Discharge chronology
| Disensitise (2008) | End of Days (2016) |

End of Days is the seventh studio album by English hardcore punk band Discharge, released on 29 April 2016 by Nuclear Blast.

== Reception and legacy ==
End of Days, Discharge's seventh studio album, was released on 29 April 2016 through Nuclear Blast Records and entered the Official UK Rock Albums Chart at number 10 and the Independent Album Chart at number 23. It would be Discharge's first album with singer Jeff "JJ" Janiak and their first album as a five-piece band. The band toured Europe and did a US tour with Eyehategod and Toxic Holocaust. MetalBlast gave the album a positive review, stating that it "...showcases everything about the band that has earned them their legendary status. The guitar work is fast and brutal, that famous D-beat drumming pattern is in full effect, and the vocals are a gruff, angry bark." The review states that the "songs are short, violent bursts of punk rock fury, brimming with an energy" with "a real sense of menace and sincerity in the tone" and it is "relentless from start to finish". The production was praised as clear and "live"-sounding; the only negative comment was the lack of melody on the record.

== Track listing ==
All tracks are written by Discharge (Jeff Janiak, Anthony "Bones" Roberts, Roy "Rainy" Wainwright, Terry " Tezz" Roberts and David Bridgewood).

Side one
| No. | Title | Length |
|---|---|---|
| 1. | "New World Order" | 3:03 |
| 2. | "Raped and Pillaged" | 1:45 |
| 3. | "End of Days" | 2:25 |
| 4. | "The Broken Law" | 2:19 |
| 5. | "False Flag Entertainment" | 1:52 |
| 6. | "Meet Your Maker" | 1:22 |
| 7. | "Hatebomb" | 2:12 |
| 8. | "It Can't Happen Here" | 2:27 |

Side two
| No. | Title | Length |
|---|---|---|
| 1. | "Infected" | 2:32 |
| 2. | "Killing Yourself to Live" | 2:47 |
| 3. | "Looking at Pictures of Genocide" | 2:12 |
| 4. | "Hung Drawn and Quartered" | 2:15 |
| 5. | "Population Control" | 2:13 |
| 6. | "The Terror Alert" | 1:55 |
| 7. | "Accessories by Molotov (Part 2)" | 2:18 |

== Personnel ==
Discharge

- Jeff Janiak – vocals, artwork and layout
- Anthony "Bones" Roberts – lead guitar
- Roy "Rainy" Wainwright – bass guitar
- Terrence "Tezz" Roberts – rhythm guitar
- David Bridgewood – drums

Additional personnel

- Dan Rowley – recording engineer
