= Grave New World (Discharge album) =

Studio album by Discharge
- Released: 16 June 1986
- Recorded: 1986
- Genres: Heavy metal; glam metal
- Length: 44:14
- Label: Clay
- Producer: Mike "Clay" Stone

Discharge chronology
Never Again (1984)	Grave New World (1986)	Massacre Divine (1991)

Grave New World is the second studio album by English hardcore punk band Discharge, released on 16 June 1986 by Clay Records. The album marks a radical stylistic change, with the band abandoning their previous hardcore punk style for a softer, and more accessible glam metal sound. The band split up in 1986, shortly after the album's release, but would end up reforming in 1990.

== Background ==
In order to promote the album, Discharge started the Grave New World tour in the UK, USA and Canada, but it would soon prove to be unsuccessful, and even disastrous for the band. By the time the group were playing in New York City, the fans were so outraged that the concert nearly turned into a riot. For instance, Bad Brains frontman H.R., got onto a balcony and started dumping ice on the musicians while they were playing. The album soon turned out to be a commercial failure. Discharge disbanded shortly after the tour.

== Style ==
The album sees the band move away from their previous style, by turning towards heavy metal, and particularly to a softer and more accessible glam metal sound. Vocalist Kelvin "Cal" Morris also switched from his previous shouting vocals to falsetto ones for this album. Morris later attributed his rediscovery of Led Zeppelin for this decision. The tempos also became much slower, and a higher-quality sound took place in the recording.

== Critical reception ==
Professional ratings
Review scores
Source	Rating
AllMusic	1/5 stars

The album received mostly mixed to negative reviews from professional music critics; AllMusic's Eduardo Rivadavia called it a "baffling and disheartening fall from grace" for the band, and also remarked that "it really might as well been credited to a different band."

In a retrospective piece for The Pensive Quill, Christopher Owens described the record as "...a classic case of ambition over ability..." but still praised it for its more progressive moments.

== Track listing ==
1. "Grave New World" - 4:10
2. "In Love Believe" - 4:54
3. "D.Y.T. / A.Y.F." - 4:08
4. "We Dare Speak (A Moment Only)" - 5:42
5. "Time Is Kind" - 4:17
6. "Sleep in Hope" - 5:54
7. "The Downward Spiral" - 15:09

== Personnel ==
- Kelvin "Cal" Morris – vocals
- Garry Maloney – drums
- Roy Rainy Wainright – bass
- Stephen "Fish" Brookes – guitar
