= Hear Nothing See Nothing Say Nothing =

Studio album by Discharge
- Released: 21 May 1982
- Recorded: 1982
- Genres: D-beat, hardcore punk, crust punk
- Length: 27:27
- Label: Clay
- Producer: Mike "Clay" Stone

Discharge chronology
Never Again (1981)	Hear Nothing See Nothing Say Nothing (1982)	Warning: Her Majesty's Government Can Seriously Damage Your Health (1983)

Hear Nothing See Nothing Say Nothing is the debut studio album by English hardcore punk band Discharge, released on 21 May 1982 by Clay Records.

The album is characterized by a minimalistic approach of music and lyrics, a heavy, distorted, and grinding guitar-driven sound and raw, shouted vocals similar to a political speech, with lyrics on anti-war themes. AllMusic calls the band's sound a "high-speed noise overload" characterized by "ferocious noise blasts."

The album is considered highly important in the evolution of extreme forms of metal and punk music, paving the way for genres such as thrash metal, black metal, crust punk and grindcore.

The sample used between the songs "Cries of Help" and "The Possibility of Life's Destruction" was taken from the 1966 pseudo-documentary The War Game.

== Reception and legacy ==
Professional ratings
Review scores
Source	Rating
AllMusic	4/5 stars
Punknews	4.5/5 stars

Media response to Hear Nothing See Nothing Say Nothing was positive. The album was listed as the number one punk album of all time in a poll by Terrorizer magazine. In David Konow's history of heavy metal, he calls the album the band's "...crowning achievement, a mercilessly brutal masterpiece." The album reached number two on the indie album chart and number 40 in the UK Albums Chart. In the early 1980s, "[i]conic punk fanzines like Flipside, which could make or break [band] reputations, pronounced them [Discharge] "fucking great." Treble zine called it one of the top ten essential hardcore albums, along with Black Flag's Damaged and the Dead Kennedys Fresh Fruit for Rotting Vegetables. Treble zine states that the music on HNSNSN was "much, much heavier" than previous punk and states that it influenced "punk rock, [and]... metal circles" with its "raw and intense" sound. Anthrax guitarist Scott Ian, whose band covered the track "Protest and Survive" on their 1991 Attack of the Killer B's compilation album, stated in 2015 that "You put on... Hear Nothing, See Nothing, Say Nothing album now, and it's still as heavy and brutal as anything out there."

The group played regularly throughout the UK, often appearing with bands such as GBH and The Exploited, and the success of the debut album also saw them touring Canada, the United States, Italy, Yugoslavia, Holland, Finland, and Sweden.

== Track listing ==
All tracks are written by Discharge (Cal Morris, Bones, Rainy, and Garry Maloney).

Side one
No.	Title	Length
1.	"Hear Nothing See Nothing Say Nothing"	1:33
2.	"The Nightmare Continues"	1:51
3.	"The Final Blood Bath"	1:42
4.	"Protest and Survive"	2:17
5.	"I Won't Subscribe"	1:39
6.	"Drunk With Power"	2:46
7.	"Meanwhile"	1:30

Side two
No.	Title	Length
1.	"A Hell on Earth"	1:54
2.	"Cries of Help"	3:07
3.	"The Possibility of Life's Destruction"	1:17
4.	"Q: And Children? A: And Children"	1:49
5.	"The Blood Runs Red"	1:36
6.	"Free Speech for the Dumb"	2:18
7.	"The End"	2:32

CD reissue bonus tracks
No.	Title	Original release	Length
15.	"Never Again"	Never Again (1981)	2:23
16.	"Death Dealers"	Never Again (1981)	1:44
17.	"Two Monstrous Nuclear Stockpiles"	Never Again (1981)	1:10
18.	"State Violence State Control"	"State Violence, State Control" (1982)	2:45
19.	"Doomsday"	"State Violence, State Control" (1982)	2:40
20.	"Warning"	Warning: Her Majesty's Government Can Seriously Damage Your Health (1983)	2:50
21.	"Where There Is a Will There Is a Way"	Warning: Her Majesty's Government Can Seriously Damage Your Health (1983)	2:06
22.	"In Defence of Our Future"	Warning: Her Majesty's Government Can Seriously Damage Your Health (1983)	2:07
23.	"Anger Burning"	Warning: Her Majesty's Government Can Seriously Damage Your Health (1983)	2:31

== Personnel ==
- Cal Morris – vocals
- Bones – guitar
- Rainy – bass
- Garry Moloney – drums
- Mike "Clay" Stone – producer
