= Discharge (band) =

English punk band

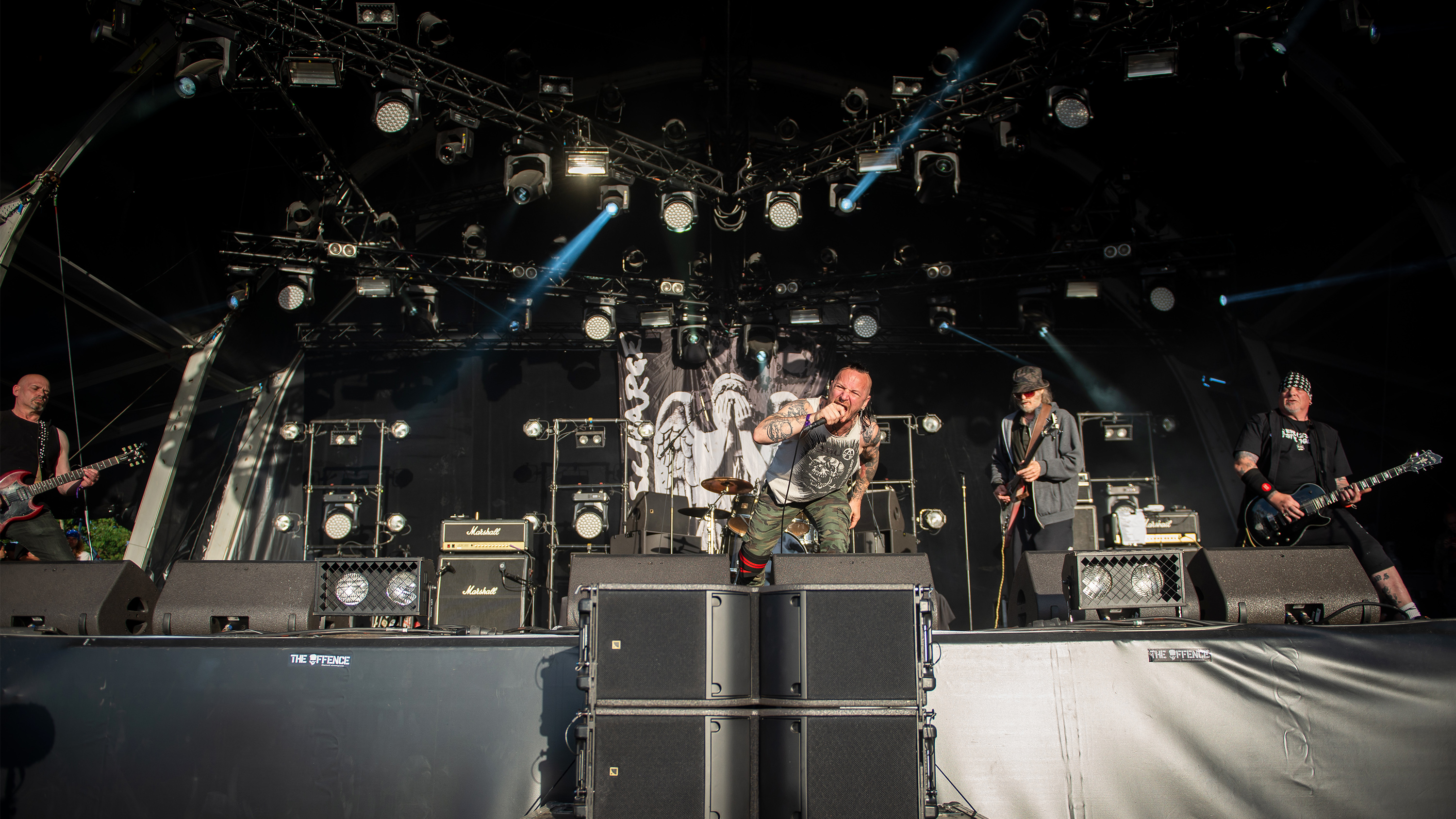
- Discharge performing live in 2022

Background information
- Origin: Stoke-on-Trent, Staffordshire, England
- Genres: Hardcore punk; heavy metal; crust punk; D-beat
- Years active: 1977–1987; 1991–1999; 2001–present
- Labels: Clay; Sanctuary; Vile; Candlelight; Nuclear Blast
- Members: Terence "Tezz" Roberts; Royston "Rainy" Wainwright; Anthony "Bones" Roberts; David "Proper" Caution; Jeff "JJ" Janiak
- Past members: Nigel Bamford; Anthony "Akko" Axon; Kelvin "Cal" Morris; Keith Haynes; Dave "Bambi" Ellesmere; "Garry" Maloney; Peter "Pooch" Purtill (also spelled "Pyrtle"); Les "The Mole" Hunt; Micky Gibson; Stephen "Fish" Brooks; Robert "Rocky Shades" Barclay; Andrew "Andy" Green; Anthony "Jake" Morgan; Nick Bushell; Anthony "Rat" Martin; Davey Quinn

Discharge are an English hardcore punk band formed in 1977 in Stoke-on-Trent, Staffordshire. The band is known for influencing several sub-genres of extreme music and their songs have been covered by many notable artists in heavy metal and other genres. The musical sub-genre of D-beat is named after Discharge and the band's distinctive drumbeat.

The band is characterized by a minimalistic approach to music and lyrics, using a heavy, distorted, and grinding guitar-driven sound and raw, shouted vocals similar to a political speech, with lyrics on anarchist and pacifist themes, over intense drone-like rhythms. The band's sound has been called a "grave-black aural acid assault." Discharge "paved the way for an astounding array of politically motivated, musically intense and deeply confrontational bands" and displayed a "revolutionary/activist" political attitude that moved British hardcore punk away from its pub rock origins and towards a "dangerous and provocative" or anti-establishment leftist territory.

Discharge influenced various extreme metal styles such as thrash metal, black metal, crust punk and grindcore. The band's "brutal, extremist approach" and "extreme thrash noise" style of playing eventually led to the thrash genre. "Discharge's influence on heavy metal is incalculable and metal superstars such as Metallica, Anthrax, Machine Head, Sepultura, Soulfly, Prong and Arch Enemy have covered Discharge's songs in tribute." Discharge is a major influence on at least two generations of metal.

== Career ==
=== Formation; early line-up (1977–1979) ===
Discharge was formed in 1977 in Stoke-on-Trent by Terence "Tezz" Roberts (vocals) and Royston "Rainy" Wainwright (guitar). They soon recruited Roberts's younger brother Anthony "Bones" Roberts on lead guitar, Nigel Bamford on bass, and Anthony "Akko" Axon (sometimes known as "Hacko") on drums. The musical style of the band was initially influenced by 1977-era punk bands such as the Sex Pistols, the Damned, and the Clash. Engaging Tanya Rich as their manager, the band recorded their first demo and began touring in support of bands such as The Ruts, The Clash, and The Damned.

=== Early EPs; Hear Nothing See Nothing Say Nothing (1980–1982) ===
Axon left later that year, followed by Bamford, and the band recruited their roadie Kelvin "Cal" Morris as vocalist, moving Tezz Roberts to drums and Wainwright to bass. With Morris's addition, the group abandoned their previous Sex Pistols-influenced material and developed a retooled sound. Anthony Roberts played guitar with a heavy, distorted and grinding style and Morris shouted or screamed vocals without melody. The bassist played with an "immense gurgling over-driven" bass tone. The tempo of the band's songs also steadily increased over the next year or so.

The new, harder-edged style also tended to use much darker, more nihilistic and violent lyrics, focusing on anarchist and pacifist themes while emphasizing the grisly effects of nuclear warfare and the social ills caused by capitalism. Like Crass, Discharge supported anarchism and displayed the anarchist symbol. The band also expressed its political and social themes in its albums' artwork, which depicted the horrors of war using an influential black-and-white photography style. One of the notable images is the "Impaled Dove" artwork from a 1930s John Heartfield anti-war poster, which depicts a dove impaled on a bayonet. The first gig with this new line-up and new sound was at Northwood Parish Hall. Among the audience was local record shop owner Mike Stone, who ran the Clay Records punk record label.

In 1980, Discharge signed with Clay Records and recorded their first single "Realities of War" in February 1980, which made the UK Indie Chart after being played on BBC1 DJ John Peel's show, peaking at number 5 and spending 44 weeks in the chart. The band also performed their first shows outside of Stoke-on-Trent in 1980, playing in Leicester, Preston and Glasgow. After two further EP releases in that same year, founding member Tezz Roberts departed, to be replaced by Dave "Bambi" Ellesmere (formerly of The Insane) before the Why EP was recorded. Ellesmere did not stay long and the band replaced him with Garry Maloney of The Varukers on drums. Why gave the band their first UK indie number one. Why had cover photos showing the corpses of dead civilians. The song "Visions of War" had an "unrepentantly angry and punishing attack" and it became a signature song for the group. The songs "Maimed and Slaughtered", "Does This System Work?", and "Mania for Conquest" set out the song and sound template for crust punk bands. At the same time, the record showed that it was possible for a hardcore band to incorporate the sonic power of "heavy metal without sacrificing ideology or anger".

The Punknews.org reviewer argues that Why "...revolutionized everything...[paving the] way for the atonal shredding of hardcore punk, thrash, death metal, and grind, but also the dead-serious political ideals and brutal backing of crust hardcore". Ian Glasper described the EP as "one of the most potent anti-war records ever made". Tom G. Warrior of Celtic Frost credited Discharge as "a revolution, much like Venom", saying, "When I heard the first two Discharge records, I was blown away. I was just starting to play an instrument and I had no idea you could go so far. And to me, they were unlike other punk bands--they sounded more like metal."

Discharge recorded their first full-length album, 1982's Hear Nothing See Nothing Say Nothing, which was later named the number one punk album of all time in a poll by Terrorizer magazine. The album reached number two on the indie album chart and number 40 in the UK Album Chart. In David Konow's history of heavy metal, he calls the album the band's "...crowning achievement, a mercilessly brutal masterpiece." Treble zine states that the album was "much, much heavier" than previous punk and states that it influenced "punk rock, [and]... metal circles" with its "raw and intense" sound. Anthrax guitarist Scott Ian stated in 2015 that "You put on... Hear Nothing, See Nothing, Say Nothing album now, and it's still as heavy and brutal as anything out there."

The group played regularly throughout the UK, often appearing with bands such as GBH and The Exploited, and the success of the debut album also saw them touring Canada, the United States, Italy, Yugoslavia, Holland, Finland, and Sweden.

=== Heavy metal crossover period; first breakup (1982–1987) ===
In 1982, Anthony "Bones" Roberts left the group, later to form Broken Bones with his brother Tezz later joining him. He was replaced by Peter "Pooch" Purtill who brought significant heavy metal influences. Purtill used a rock and metal style of guitar playing, including rock-oriented guitar solos. The Warning... EP shows drastic stylistic differences, with Morris changing his angry shouts to a mix of regular singing and football chants. Morris began to use a heavy metal, Ozzy Osbourne-influenced vocal style. As well, the band used significantly slower tempos and their D-beat punk style was replaced with metal-oriented beats.

After the single "Ignorance" was released in 1985, Purtill and Maloney left the band to form the punk/metal crossover band HellsBelles, to be replaced by guitarists Les "The Mole" Hunt and drummer Michael "Micky" Gibson. Following the later addition of second guitarist Stephen "Fish" Brooks, they released 1986's Grave New World, a mainstream metal album with a glam sound built upon Morris's high-pitched singing style. The album reached the indie top 10, but the band struggled with personnel problems as Morris departed and was briefly replaced by ex-Wrathchild frontman Rob "Rocky Shades" Berkeley the following year. The group disbanded shortly thereafter.

=== Reformation with new line-up (1990–1999) ===
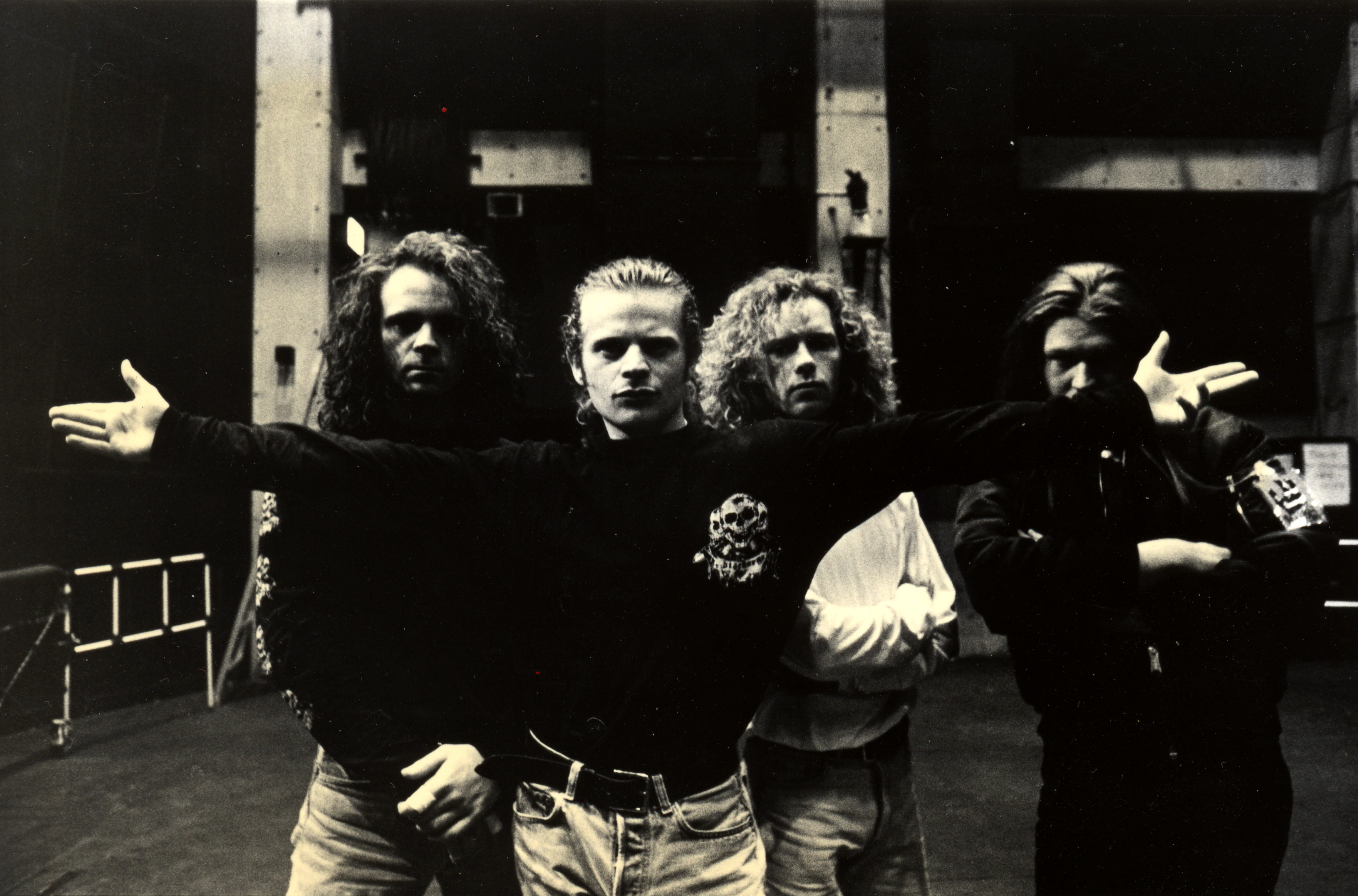
Discharge in Kawasaki, Japan, 1991

Morris formed a new version of the band in 1990 with Andrew "Andy" Green on guitar, Anthony Morgan on bass, and Mika Karppinen initially playing drums but soon replaced by the returning Maloney. The Live At The City Garden, New Jersey album on Clay Records followed. In 1991 they released Massacre Divine, which retained the metal sound, though with a noticeably harder edge than on Grave New World. Morris again changed his vocal style, this time to rougher growling, similar to Brian Johnson of AC/DC. They toured widely in support of the record, including their only visit to Japan. In 1993 they released Shootin' Up the World, which continued Morris's new vocal style, but the songs were significantly heavier than on Massacre Divine. The album retains the metal direction, although experiments with strange lyrics and song structures, coming close to thrash metal at times. Morris assembled further versions of the group, but they again disbanded in 1999.

=== Reunion of classic line-up and the Rat years (2001–2014) ===
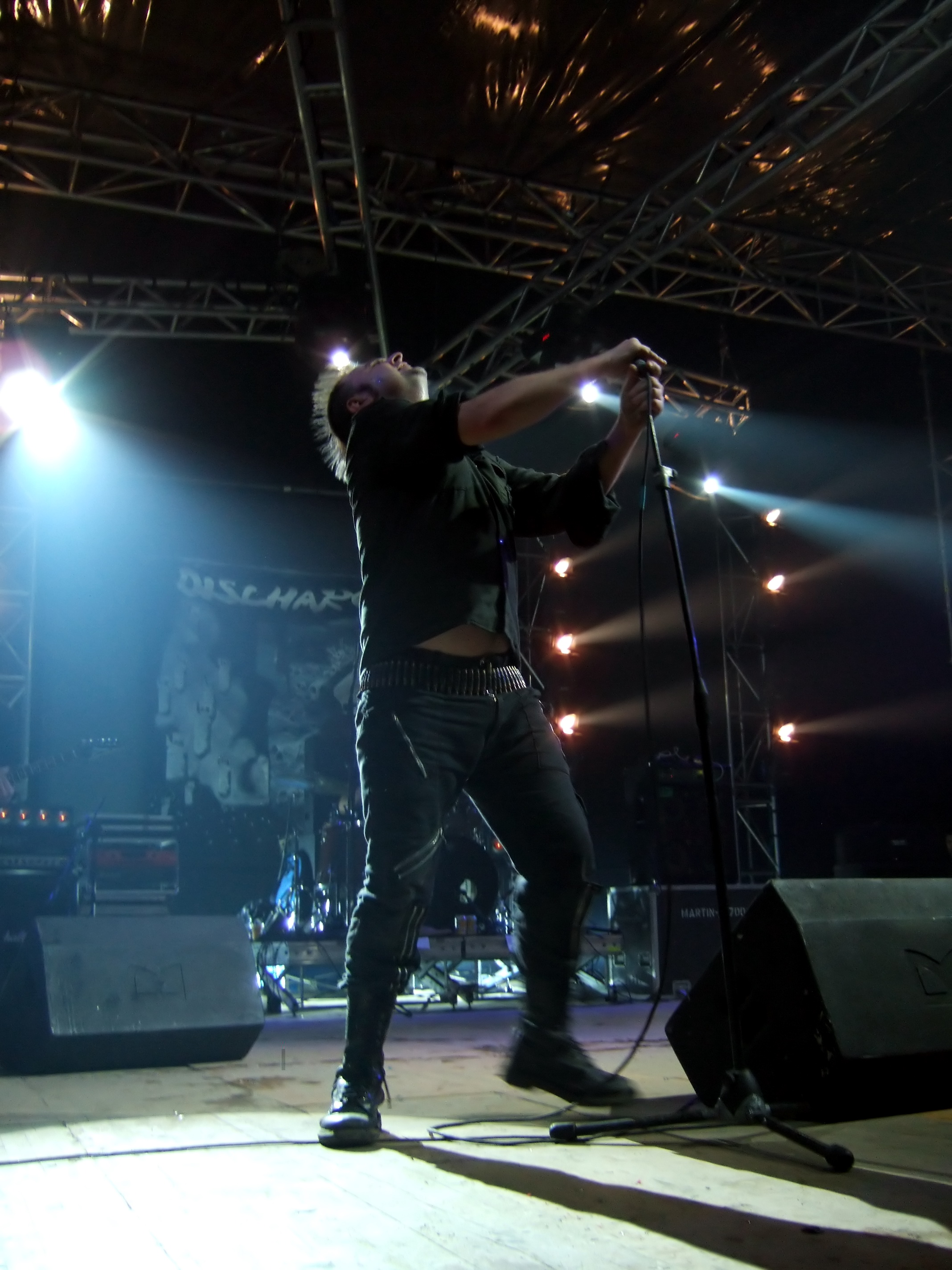
Discharge performing in Rome in 2006.

In 2001, the classic line-up of Morris, Roberts, and Wainright reunited after meeting at a party held by original bassist Bamford, and in 2002 they released their self-titled album Discharge, a return to their early 1980s style featuring political commentary and aggressive playing.

Morris would not commit to touring and left the band, to be replaced by Anthony "Rat" Martin of The Varukers. The single "The Beginning of the End" was released in 2006, which marked a further step towards a return to the punk sound. Dave "Proper" Caution replaced Terence Roberts after his second departure this same year and the group released the Disensitise album in 2008. In 2011 the band released the EP Propaganda Feeds. In 2012 they released a split single with American band Off with Their Heads, released on Drunken Sailor Records. In 2014, Rat played his last show with the band in Ireland and was then fired.

=== End of Days (2014–present) ===
Shortly after Rat's firing, it was announced that Jeff "JJ" Janiak would be taking over vocal duties whilst Tezz Roberts returned to the band, except this time on rhythm guitar rather than drums. This made Discharge a five-piece for the first time. On 3 June 2015, the group premiered a new song called "New World Order". An EP of the same title was released on 16 January 2016. On 3 March 2016, the Nuclear Blast YouTube channel uploaded a new song, "Hatebomb", which would later on be available through other streaming services. End of Days, Discharge's seventh studio album, was released on 29 April through Nuclear Blast Records and entered the Official UK rock charts at No. 10 and on the indie charts at No. 23. The success of the album saw the band touring Europe and the US. MetalBlast gave the album a positive review, stating that it "...showcases everything about the band that has earned them their legendary status. The guitar work is fast and brutal, that famous D-beat drumming pattern is in full effect, and the vocals are a gruff, angry bark." The review states that the "songs are short, violent bursts of punk rock fury, brimming with an energy" with "a real sense of menace and sincerity in the tone" and it is "[r]elentless from start to finish".

On 30 December 2017, the group played a support slot for the original Misfits reunion at the LA Forum in Los Angeles, California. The 17,000 capacity venue sold out in less than one minute.

== Influence ==
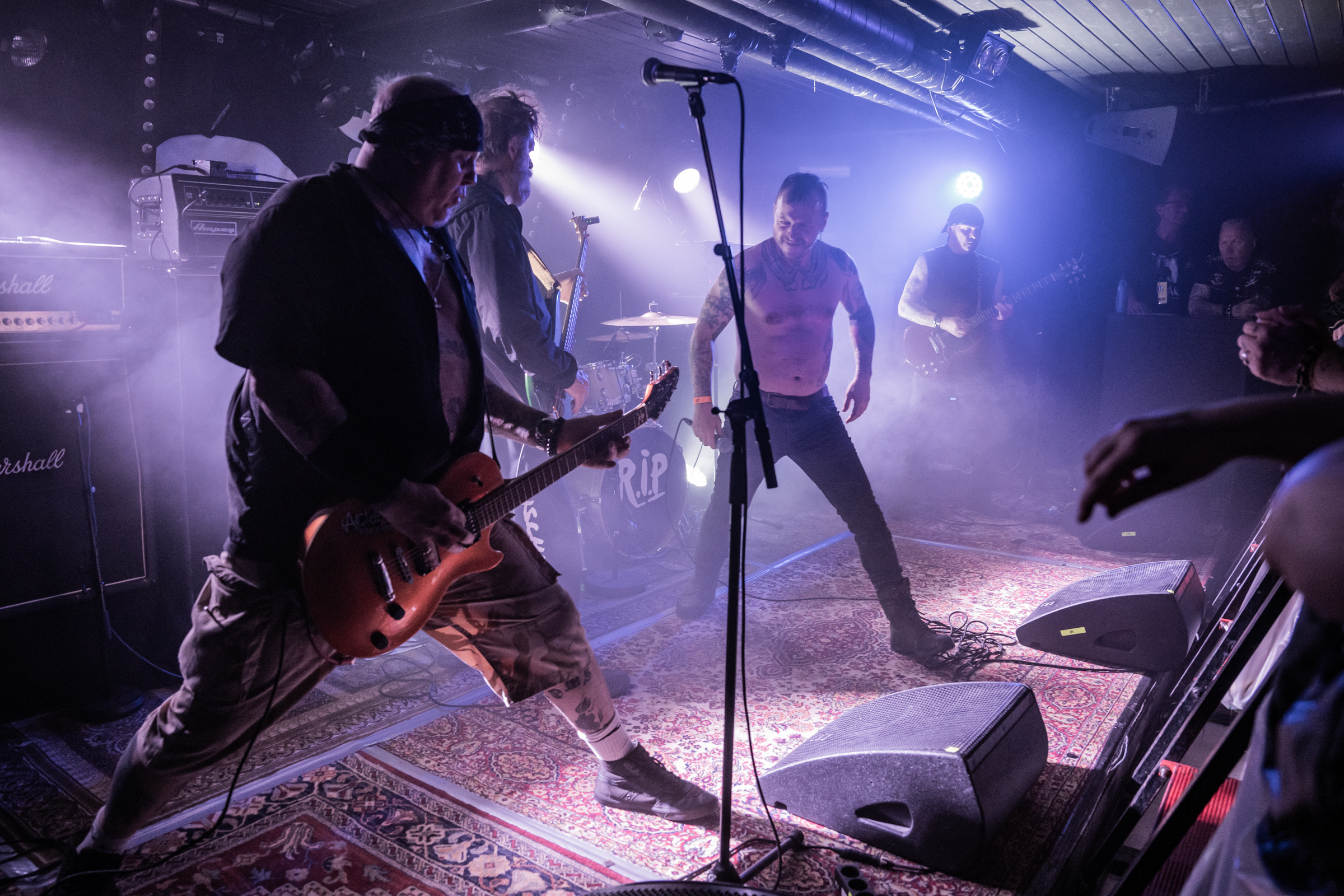
Discharge performing in 2024

As well defining the D-beat subgenre, Discharge influenced bands operating within other types of extreme music. Decibel magazine states that there are "...few bands who have had more influence over so many different scenes than Discharge", including the first generation of thrash, grindcore, and hardcore groups.

"Discharge's influence on heavy metal is incalculable and metal superstars such as Metallica, Anthrax, and Sepultura have covered Discharge's songs in tribute." Some photos of Metallica, Anthrax and Exodus band members from the early 1980s show them wearing Discharge T-shirts. Thrash metal groups like Metallica and Slayer were inspired by their speed and brutality. Anthrax was already playing Discharge cover songs by 1983.

In an interview with The Guardian in 2016, the band was cited as a primary influence on the avant-garde metal group Neurosis. The band's singer/guitarist Steve Von Till stated that Discharge "...bridged the gap between Motörhead, Venom and punk rock" with their "huge fucking wall-of-sound guitar that was just ridiculously punishing, taking on heavy metal's gain and volume but creating something totally unique and new."

Early grindcore acts such as Napalm Death and Repulsion were influenced by Discharge, as were death metal acts such as At the Gates and Nihilist. Discharge were also crucial to the development of crust punk, influencing many of the first crust bands, such as Doom, Hellbastard and Antisect. Other artists citing Discharge as an influence include Hellhammer, Celtic Frost, Sodom, Holocausto, Sepultura, Sarcófago, Attila Csihar, Blasphemy, Queens Of The Stone Age, Machine Head, Prong, Dogstar, and Slipknot. James Hetfield of Metallica nominated Cal Morris for Rolling Stone's 100 Greatest Singers poll.

Discharge's wide influence can also be seen in the range of cover versions recorded by hardcore punk and metal groups. The Scottish anarcho-punk band Oi Polloi covered the song "State Violence, State Control". During the same period, the Swedish hardcore punk band Mob 47 covered "Never Again" on their Ultimate Attack recording. New York City anarchist crust band Nausea recorded "Ain't No Feeble Bastard" and "Hear Nothing, See Nothing, Say Nothing", on The Punk Terrorist Anthology, Vol. 1. Swedish grindcore band Nasum covered "Visions of War" for a tribute compilation. D-beat/hardcore band From Ashes Rise recorded "Hell on Earth". In 2003, US hardcore band Ensign covered "Protest and Survive" on their album of covers Love the Music, Hate the Kids. Swedish melodic death metal band Arch Enemy covered the song "Warning" on their 2011 album Khaos Legions.

Metal groups from several subgenres have recorded Discharge songs. Thrash metal bands covering Discharge material include Metallica ("Free Speech For The Dumb" and "The More I See", on their covers album Garage Inc.); Anthrax ("Protest and Survive" on their album Attack of the Killer B's); and Sepultura ("A Look At Tomorrow", "Hear Nothing See Nothing Say Nothing" and "Protest and Survive"). The groove metal band Machine Head covered "The Possibility of Life's Destruction" as a bonus track to their album The More Things Change.... Soulfly covered "Ain't No Feeble Bastard" and "The Possibility of Life's Destruction".

UK doom metal band Solstice covered "Protest & Survive". Norwegian black metal band Carpathian Forest covered "The Possibilities of Life's Destruction" on their compilation album We're Going to Hell for This: Over a Decade of Perversions, while grindcore/death metal band Napalm Death covered "War's No Fairytale" on their Leaders Not Followers: Part 2 album. Swedish melodic death metal band At the Gates covered "The Nightmare Continues" as a hidden track on their With Fear I Kiss the Burning Darkness album. French doom/sludge band Monarch! covered "A Look at Tomorrow" on their A Look at Tomorrow/Mass Destruction EP. UK drone/sludge band Moss covered "Maimed And Slaughtered" on their Tombs of the Blind Drugged EP. British black metal band The Meads of Asphodel recorded a medley style cover of "Hell on Earth" and "Blood Runs Red" for their 2006 EP In the Name of God, Welcome to Planet Genocide.

== Members ==
Current members

- Terry "Tezz" Roberts – vocals (1977), drums (1977–1980, 2001–2006), guitar (2014–present)
- Roy "Rainy" Wainwright – bass (1977–1987, 2001–present), guitar (1977)
- Tony "Bones" Roberts – guitar (1977–1982, 2001–present)
- Dave "Proper Caution" Bridgwood – drums (2006–present)
- Jeff "JJ" Janiak – vocals (2014–present)

== Discography ==
- Hear Nothing See Nothing Say Nothing (1982)
- Grave New World (1986)
- Massacre Divine (1991)
- Shootin' Up the World (1993)
- Discharge (2002)
- Disensitise (2008)
- End of Days (2016)
