= Clay Records =

UK record label

- Parent company: Sanctuary Records Group (BMG Rights Management)
- Founded: 1980
- Founder: Mike Stone
- Defunct: 1996
- Status: Defunct
- Distributor(s): Pinnacle Entertainment
- Genre: Heavy metal; hard rock; punk rock; hardcore punk
- Country of origin: England
- Location: Stoke-on-Trent

Clay Records was an independent record label founded by Mike Stone in 1980 and based in a record shop in Stoke-on-Trent, England.

== History ==
Clay's first release came from local Stoke punk band Discharge. Their Realities of War EP came out in April 1980. Stone distributed the EP out of the boot of his car but it still made it into the top 10 of the indie chart in the music magazine Sounds. The label went on to sign artists including Play Dead, The Lurkers, Demon and G.B.H. Members of Clay went on to form Jungle Records in 1984.

In 1996, the label's distributor, Pinnacle Entertainment, went under, resulting in Mike Stone losing £25,000. This led him to close the label in 1996. In January 2000, the label's assets were sold off to Trojan Records, who was subsequently acquired by Sanctuary Records Group in 2001. Subsequently, Clay Records back catalogue is owned by Sanctuary/BMG Rights Management.

== Discography ==
Releases by Clay Records were:

=== 7"/12" Releases ===
- CLAY 1 (1980) - Discharge: Realities of War 7-inch EP
- CLAY 2 (1980) - Plastic Idols: Adventure 7-inch
- CLAY 3 (1980) - Discharge: Fight Back 7-inch EP
- CLAY 4 (1980) - Demon: Liar 7-inch
- CLAY 5 (1980) - Discharge: Decontrol 7-inch EP
- CLAY 6 (1981) - Discharge: Never Again 7-inch EP
- CLAY 7 (1981) - Dave EDGE: then world 7-inch
- CLAY 8 (1982) - GBH: No Survivors 7-inch EP
- CLAY 9 (1982) - Zanti Misfitz: Kidz Songs 7-inch
- CLAY 10 (1982) - White Door: Way of the World 7-inch
- CLAY 11 (1982) - GBH: Sick Boy 7-inch EP
- CLAY 12 (1982) - The Lurkers: This Dirty Town 7-inch
- CLAY 13 (1982) - Zanti Misfitz: Love Ends at 8 7-inch
- CLAY 14 (1982) - Discharge: State Violence State Control 7-inch
- CLAY 15 (1982) - White Door: Kings of the Orient 7-inch/12"
- CLAY 16 (1982) - GBH: Give Me Fire 7-inch
- CLAY 17 (1982) - The Lurkers: Drag You Out 7-inch
- CLAY 17P (1982) - The Lurkers: Drag you Out 7-inch pic disc
- CLAY 18 (1982) - KILLJOYS: this is not love 7-inch
- CLAY 19 (1982) - LOWLIFE: logic & lust 7-inch
- CLAY 20 unreleased
- CLAY 21 (1983) - The Lurkers: Frankenstein Again 7-inch
- CLAY 22 (1983) - GBH: Catch 23 7-inch
- CLAY 23 (1983) - White Door: Love Breakdown 7-inch/12"
- CLAY 24 (1983) - Abrasive Wheels: Jailhouse Rock 7-inch
- CLAY 25 (1983) - Demon: The Plague 7-inch
- CLAY 26 (1983) - White Door: Windows 7-inch
- CLAY 27 (1983) - Sex Gang Children: Maurita Mayer 7-inch
- CLAY 28 (1983) - Abrasive Wheels: Banner of Hope 7-inch
- CLAY 29 (1983) - Discharge: The Price of Silence 7-inch
- CLAY 30 (1983) - White Door: Jerusalem 7-inch
- CLAY 31 (1984) - Play Dead: Break 7-inch/12"
- CLAY 32 (1984) - The Lurkers: Let's Dance Again 7-inch
- CLAY 33 (1984) - Abrasive Wheels: The Prisoner EP
- CLAY 34 (1984) - Discharge: The More I See 7-inch/12"
- CLAY 35 (1984) - Play Dead: Isobel 7-inch
- CLAY 36 (1984) - GBH: Do What You Do 7-inch
- CLAY 37 (1984) - White Door: Flame In My Heart 7-inch/12"
- CLAY 39 (1984) - The Veil: Manikin 12-inch
- CLAY 40 (1984) - Play Dead: Conspiracy 7-inch/12"
- CLAY 41 (1985) - Demon: Wonderland 7-inch/12"
- CLAY 42 (1985) - Play Dead: Sacrosanct 7-inch/12"
- CLAY 43 (1985) - Discharge: Ignorance 7-inch/12"
- CLAY 44 (1985) - Rebel Christening: Tribal Eye 12-inch
- CLAY 45 (1985) - The Veil: Twist 7-inch

=== 12" EP Releases ===
- PLATE 1 (1981) - Product: Style Wars 12-inch
- PLATE 2 (1981) - Discharge: Why 12-inch
- PLATE 3 (1981) - GBH: Leather, Bristles, Studs and Acne 12-inch
- PLATE 4 (1983) - Zanti Misfitz: Heroe's Are Go! 12-inch
- PLATE 5 (1983) - Discharge: Warning 12-inch
- PLATE 6 (1983) - English Dogs: Mad Punx and English Dogs 12-inch
- PLATE 7 (1984) - The Lurkers: The Final Vinyl 12-inch
- PLATE 8 (1986) - Demon: Sampler 12-inch

=== LP Releases ===
- CLAY LP 1 (1979) - Grace: Grace LP
- CLAY LP 2 (1981) - Grace: Grace Live LP
- CLAY LP 3 (1982) - Discharge: Hear Nothing See Nothing Say Nothing LP
- CLAY LP 4 (1982) - GBH: City Baby Attacked by Rats LP
- CLAY LP 5 (1982) - GBH: Leather, Bristles, No Survivors and Sick Boys LP
- CLAY LP 6 (1983) - Demon: The Plague LP
- CLAY LP 7 (1983) - White Door: Windows LP
- CLAY LP 8 (1983) - GBH: City Babys Revenge LP
- CLAY LP 9 (1984) - Abrasive Wheels: Black Leather Girl LP
- CLAY LP 10 (1984) - English Dogs: Invasion of the Porky Men LP
- CLAY LP 11 (1984) - Play Dead: From the Promised Land LP
- CLAY LP 12 (1984) - Discharge: Never Again LP
- CLAY LP 14 (1984) - The Veil: Surrender
- CLAY LP 15 (1985) - Demon: British Standard Approved LP
- CLAY LP 16 (1985) - Play Dead: Into the Fire LP
- CLAY LP 17 (1985) - They Only Come Out at Night Compilation LP
- CLAY LP 18 (1985) - Demon: Heart of Our Times LP
- CLAY LP 19 (1986) - Discharge: Grave New World LP
- CLAY LP 20 (1986) - Play Dead: The Singles 1982-1985 LP
- CLAY LP 21 (1986) - GBH: The Clay Years: 1981-1984 LP
- CLAY LP 22 (1987) - Demon: The Unexpected Guest LP
- CLAY LP 23 (1987) - Demon: Breakout LP
- CLAY LP 24 (1987) - Discharge: 1980-1986 LP
- CLAY LP 25 (1988) - Demon: Night of the Demon LP
- CLAY LP 26 (1988) - Climax Blues Band: Drastic Steps LP
- CLAY 101 (1989) - Chelsea: Unreleased Stuff LP
- CLAY LP 105 (1990) - Driven To Death Compilation LP

== See also ==
- List of record labels
- Category:Albums produced by Mike "Clay" Stone
