= Philadelphia punk scene =

Music scene in Philadelphia, Pennsylvania

The Philadelphia punk scene refers to the vibrant punk rock scene created in Philadelphia, Pennsylvania.

== History ==
=== 1980s ===
Because of its location, Philadelphia was an easy place for bands from New York City and Washington, D.C. to play concerts. Venues such as the Elk's Center, Love Hall, Long March, Community Education Center (CEC) and Abe's Steaks, a small hoagie shop, regularly held hardcore punk shows during the 1980s. WEL Records played a role with their relentless promotion. Other notable sites such as the Starlite Ballroom, BYO Hall, East Side Club, West Side Club, which was actually Jeff Jenkins' basement in West Philadelphia, The Kennel Club, and Buff Hall were hosts of shows by well known hardcore bands. Together these venues hosted shows not only by local hardcore punk bands but also more well known bands like Bad Brains, Black Flag, Circle Jerks, Flipper, Minor Threat, SS Decontrol, and others. The local hardcore scene drew from Philadelphia as well as Delaware County, Pennsylvania; South Jersey, Reading, Allentown, Delaware, and other surrounding suburbs in the Philadelphia metropolitan area and Lehigh Valley.

An important source of exposing the Philadelphia region to this music were the DJs Jeff Jenkins and Steve Lukshides at Drexel University's radio station WKDU 91.7 FM, Stockton University's radio station WLFR 91.7 FM, and Eddie "Hacksaw" at University of Pennsylvania's WXPN 88.5 FM. Music by some of the early Philadelphia hardcore bands were included on the 1983 compilation LP Get Off My Back.

South Street served as the center of the Philadelphia punk scene since the mid to late 1970s, and bars and music venues on the street featured hardcore punk acts in the 1980s. Important bands in the early Philadelphia punk scene include The Dead Milkmen, a band that played an often sarcastic and humorous variant of hardcore punk. Though formed in Los Angeles, the hardcore punk band Fear had considerable connections to Philadelphia during the band's heyday; Fear's frontman Lee Ving was a Philadelphia native, and he notably referenced the Philadelphia South Street punk scene in the 1983 song "I Don't Care About You".

== 21st century ==
In the 2010s, Philadelphia has been said to have the best punk scene in the country. Venues in the city became a haven for many pop punk and emo bands from other parts of Pennsylvania, New Jersey, Delaware, even Boston and Detroit. Some bands credited with keeping the punk scene alive in Philadelphia are The Wonder Years, Modern Baseball, and Cayetana along with others. Notable house venues include Ava House, Terrordome, The Golden Tea House and Pariah.

== Notable bands (in alphabetical order) ==
- August is Falling
- Algernon Cadwallader
- An Albatross
- Balance and Composure
- Beach Slang
- Blacklisted
- Cayetana
- Circa Survive
- Everyone Everywhere
- Ex Friends
- Flag of Democracy (F.O.D.)
- Glocca Morra
- Hop Along
- Hot Cross
- Ink & Dagger
- Jesus Piece
- Kid Dynamite
- Little Big League
- The Low Budgets
- Mannequin Pussy
- Marietta
- MewithoutYou
- Mischief Brew
- Modern Baseball
- Pagan Babies
- Paint It Black
- Pure Hell
- Restorations
- Ruin
- Snowing
- The Stick Men
- Slaughter Beach, Dog
- Soul Glo
- Swearin'
- The Dead Milkmen
- The Menzingers
- The Virus
- The Wonder Years
- Tigers Jaw
- Kaonashi
- Title Fight
