= Slow Motion Apocalypse =

Studio album by Grotus
- Released: April 20, 1993
- Recorded: October–December 1992
- Studio: Various: G's rehearsal studio; (San Francisco, CA); Rhythm and Noise Compound; (San Francisco, CA)
- Genre: Experimental rock, industrial rock, alternative metal
- Length: 51:01
- Label: Alternative Tentacles
- Producer: Eric Holland

Grotus chronology
Luddite (1992)	Slow Motion Apocalypse (1993)	The Opiate of the Masses (1994)

Slow Motion Apocalypse is the second studio album by Grotus, released on April 20, 1993, by Alternative Tentacles. Boasting eastern music influences and a more mature sound, the album is considered by some to be the highlight of their career, despite Allmusic considering Brown their best album pick. The album also leans towards a more metal sound, unlike the first and last releases.

== Release and reception ==
Trouser Press noted that the album contains "the alluring music of Luddite and a judicious bit of the sampling activity of Brown" and "Middle Eastern flavor that conjures images of an armor-plated belly dancer."

=== Accolades ===
Publication	Country	Accolade	Year	Rank
Tip	Germany	"Albums of the Year" (Thomas Weiland)	1993	7
Kerrang!	United Kingdom	"Albums of the Year"	1993	14

== Track listing ==
All lyrics are written by Lars Fox; all music is composed by Grotus, except "Good Evening" by Lars Fox and "Slow Motion Apocalypse" by Adam Tanner.

No.	Title	Length
1.	"Up Rose the Mountain"	3:53
2.	"Good Evening"	1:08
3.	"The Same Old Sauce"	2:08
4.	"Hourglass"	3:43
5.	"Shivayanama"	4:41
6.	"Complications"	3:54
7.	"Kali Yuga"	3:22
8.	"Clean"	4:40
9.	"Sleepwalking"	6:04
10.	"Medicine"	3:07
11.	"Slow Motion Apocalypse" (includes "Brown" (Remix) as a hidden track)	14:21

== Personnel ==
Adapted from the Slow Motion Apocalypse liner notes.

Grotus

- Bruce Boyd – drums, cover art, design
- John Carson – bass guitar, sampler
- Lars Fox – vocals, sampler, percussion
- Adam Tanner – Fender Bass VI, guitar, Jupiter-8, sampler, cover art, design

Production and additional personnel

- Fawnee Evnochides – cover art, design
- Grotus – production
- Eric Holland – production, engineering

== Release history ==
Region	Date	Label	Format	Catalog
United States	1993	Alternative Tentacles	CD, CS, LP	Virus 118
