= Hand to Mouth =

Hand to Mouth may refer to:

- Hand to Mouth (album), 1986 album by General Public
- "Hand to Mouth" (song), 1987 song by George Michael
- Hand to Mouth, 1987 album by Mickey Raphael
- "Hand to Mouth" (Grotus song), 1995 song by the Experimental band Grotus
- Hand to Mouth: Living in Bootstrap America, a 2014 book by Linda Tirado
- Paul Auster's 1997 autobiography Hand to Mouth
- From Hand to Mouth, a 1919 film starring Harold Lloyd
