= Glenn Wallis =

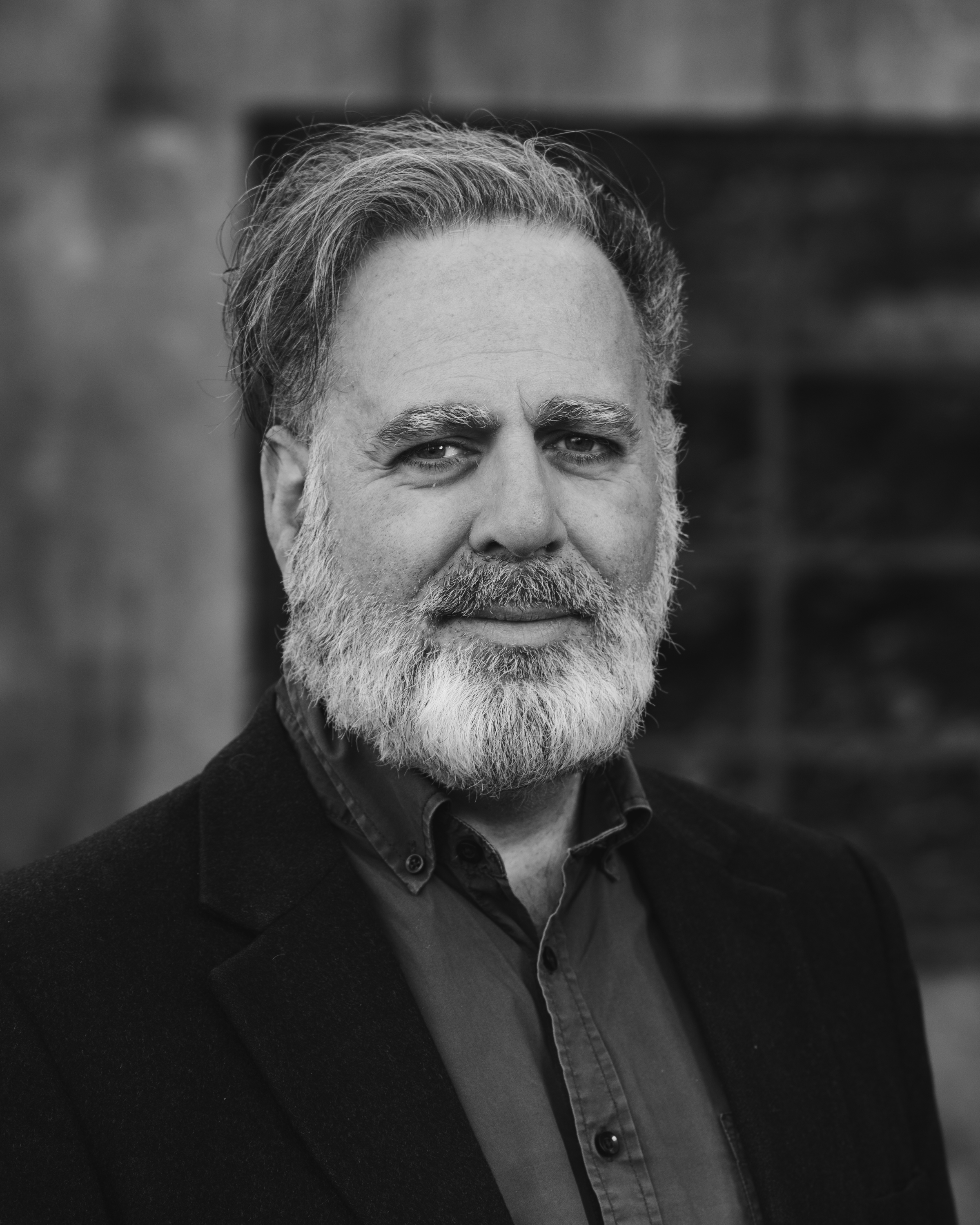
- Born: 1958 (age 67–68); Norman, Oklahoma
- Education: Harvard University
- Occupations: Writer, educator, scholar
- Writing career
- Notable work: A Critique of Western Buddhism: Ruins of the Buddhist Real
- Website: www.glennwallis.com

Glenn Wallis is an American writer, educator, musician, scholar, and public intellectual known for his work with the band Ruin and in the fields of Buddhism, anarchism, critical pedagogy, and mysticism. He is the founder of Incite Seminars, a non-traditional educational initiative based in Philadelphia, and a central figure in the emerging movement known as non-buddhism. Wallis's work tends to combine rigorous academic scholarship with creative and stylistic sophistication. Many of his online flipbook "tracts," for example, contain a self-composed ambient soundtrack. While his work offers far-reaching critique, particularly of education and Buddhism, it nonetheless contains a strong utopian impulse.

== Education ==
Wallis cites as a formative educational experience his time as a student in a Free School called Our New School, in Moorestown, New Jersey. When the school closed before he could graduate, he dropped out of high school. The school operated on anarchist educational principles of organization, hence providing Wallis with direct experience of non-authoritarian and non-hierarchical education. Wallis eventually graduated with a B.A. in philosophy from Temple University. He then studied philosophy and Buddhism for five years at the Freie Universität in Berlin, Germany and Georg-August Universität in Göttingen Germany before receiving his Ph.D. from Harvard University in Sanskrit with an emphasis on Buddhist studies. Wallis's dissertation, The Persistence of Power: Ritual in the Mañjuśrīmūlakalpa, was written under the direction of Charles Hallisey.

== Academic career ==
Wallis has taught in the Religion or Philosophy department of several universities: The University of Georgia, Brown University, Bowdoin College, Rhode Island School of Design, and Penn State Abington. In 2006, he resigned his tenured professorship at Georgia to take a non-tenure position at the Won Institute of Graduate Studies, where he taught until 2016. Wallis identifies more strongly with para-academia and outsider art than with traditionally institutionalized forms.

== Ruin ==
Wallis is the founder of the American punk band Ruin, from Philadelphia. According to Pulitzer Prize-nominated rock critic Ken Tucker, by 1984 Ruin had established itself as "one of the most promising bands" in the Philadelphia region, "an ambitious group unto something new—a striking synthesis of rock styles." By 1986, Ruin had become "one of the most beloved bands in the history of Philly," according to Maximum Rocknroll's Stacey Finney. WKDU deejay Mike Eidle has gone as far as to call them "the best Philly band ever."

Ruin was known for its high energy stage shows. The band employed theatrical elements that were alien to punk rock's aesthetic of unadorned simplicity. In an interview, singer Thomas Adams has said that it is understandable that they were mistaken for "mysticism", "spirituality", or Buddhist quietism, though Ruin has more in common with Antonin Artaud's Theatre of Cruelty or Guy Debord's Situationist International.

== Speculative Non-Buddhism ==
In 2011, Wallis launched the blog "Speculative Non-Buddhism". According to Matthew O'Connell at the podcast The Imperfect Buddha, non-buddhism is "a complex but important topic ... an applied critique of Buddhism as ideology, as an unintentional prison. This work gets at the heart of what’s missing in Buddhism and Buddhist discourse: a failure to understand the collective formation of selves." In American Dharma: Buddhism Beyond Modernity (Yale University Press), scholar Ann Gleig characterizes the project thus: "The most theoretically sophisticated and sustained interrogation of Western Buddhism has come from the Speculative Non-Buddhists." Gleig, however, astutely captures common criticisms of the project when she notes:

The SNB [Speculative Non-Buddhism] pieces are linguistically dense, jargon heavy, and theoretically challenging—an intentional strategy to serve as an antidote to what the authors bemoan as the "anti-intellectualism" of Western Buddhism, but one that also rendered its analytic project inaccessible to many...Another intentional strategy was SNB’s adoption of an aggressive and combative communicative style in which participants were more often than not ridiculed, humiliated, and bullied. Wallis theorized his communicative style as performative of its analytic content, but it led to the blog receiving more commentary about its methods than its analysis.

Wallis seems to admit as much when he says, "I am a militant anti-right-speechist. So, I actually value very critical, even hostile, questions." He also points out that while he is the principle writer for SNB, over thirty guest authors have contributed essays, making it difficult to generalize.

On this blog you will find a motley assortment of authors, voices, genres, argumentation styles, theories, methodologies, ideologies, agendas, recommendations, refutations, offerings, refusals, and more.

For his own part, he characterizes the non-buddhism project thus:

Recently, I have found the entire Buddhist project fruitlessly tedious. (And I felt this long before it limped its way into the current New Age desert of mindfulness, wellness, positivity, and yoga culture.) I’ve been asking myself this galvanizing question: what might happen if I were to take seriously the Buddha’s admonishment to "cast aside the raft" and "leave the collapsed house in shambles"? In thought, in relations, in life, what might happen?

Wallis's invention of non-buddhism is heavily influenced by François Laruelle's project of non-philosophy or non-standard philosophy. Somewhat enigmatically, seemingly contradictorily, and yet revealingly, Laruelle says, "Non-philosophical writing is my way of mystical practice and messianic fidelity." Wallis takes up both this "practice" and this "fidelity" in his tract Non Buddhist Mysticism: Performing Irreducible and Primitive Presence. Crucially, invention is a central conceit of non-buddhism. As Laruelle says of non-philosophy, the task is "to introduce a certain rigour of rules, and to provide an example of reflection on the conditions of invention."

== A Critique of Western Buddhism: Ruins of the Buddhist Real ==
The culmination of the speculative non-buddhism invention was the 2019 book A Critique of Western Buddhism: Ruins of the Buddhist Real. Princeton University professor Jonathan Gold calls the work a "sophisticated philosophical critique of Buddhism." This view is seconded by professor Lehel Balogh of Hokkaido University who calls it "a seminal critical text that asks more profound questions and comes up with more promising answers than most of what we could find in the past half-century's literature on Buddhism in the West."

=== Criticism ===
However, those same reviewers echo a not uncommon criticism of the book that the language is unnecessarily difficult, and even prone to jargon. Gold, furthermore, criticizes "Wallis’ uncharitable reading of Buddhist paradoxes...If the purpose behind paradoxical language is practical and designed to direct one toward a particular meditative state, then the fact that it is illogical to the point of 'stupidity' is irrelevant."

Annabella Pitkin asks, "Where are the people in this book?" adding, "the reader may be left feeling that the tumultuous and contentious living worlds of Buddhism in our present moment have gotten elided into what at times appears a smooth philosophical surface, ripe for critique to be sure, but also strangely silent."

As a general response to such "anticipated" criticism, Wallis writes, "Any critique of Buddhism that uses Buddhist materials is setting itself up to be absorbed back into the fold as yet one more iteration of Buddhism. A critique will thus have to be nimble and have to hit hard." He takes pains to note what non-buddhism is not: it is "not a rectification" or an attempt at reform, or an anthropology, or even a criticism per se. Ultimately, he insists, non-buddhism is a theory of Buddhism.

== Incite Seminars ==
In 2016, Wallis founded the experimental educational project Incite Seminars. Originally located in downtown Philadelphia, the project went online during the COVID-19 pandemic in 2020. It has remained exclusively online since.

According to Wallis, the founding of Incite Seminars "was sparked by a very personal response to the escalating social inequality, intensifying racial unrest, and eviscerating techno-consumer capitalism that I increasingly witnessed all around me."

The catalyzing moment came at 2:30 AM on November 9, 2016 as Donald Trump and his destructive politics of right-wing, white supremacist, economic nationalism rose to power in America. It was a moment that vanquished all doubt concerning the brutish consequences of American delusion and ignorance.

Incite Seminars was conceived as a small contribution towards a solution, whereby each seminar would be an experiential immersion in self-reflection, self-formation, and social critique. Through reading, thinking, and discussion, participants realize unknown intellectual potentials, enhance interpersonal communication, and discover creative, effective, and even dangerous ways of acting toward a genuinely just world.

In spite of its intentions to the contrary, the project receives regular criticism from observers on the far left — particularly from anarchist and communist sympathizers — for being commercial and exclusive. Wallis counters this criticism by pointing to a no-cost "solidarity" option for every seminar.

French philosopher Jacques Rancière's conception of "unlearning" in his 1987 book The Ignorant Schoolmaster figures prominently in the pedagogical underpinnings of Incite Seminars. Particularly salient are Rancière's ideas that "Everything is in everything; learn something and relate it to all the rest," and "Explication is the annihilation of one mind by another…Whoever teaches without emancipating, stultifies." Wallis spells out these ideas in his education tract, How to Fix Education: A Handbook for Direct Action.

== Selected publications ==
Books

- Nietzsche NOW! The Great Immoralist on the Vital Issues of Our Time. (New York: Warbler Press, 2024).
- Non Buddhist Mysticism: Performing Irreducible and Primitive Presence (Roskilde, Denmark: EyeCorner Press, 2022).
- An Anarchist’s Manifesto (New York: Warbler Press, 2020).
- How to Fix Education: A Handbook for Direct Action (New York: Warbler Press, 2020).
- A Critique of Western Buddhism: Ruins of the Buddhist Real (London: Bloomsbury Academic, 2019).
- Cruel Theory | Sublime Practice: Toward a Revaluation of Buddhism (Roskilde, Denmark: EyeCorner Press, 2013) (co-authored with Tom Pepper and Matthias Steingass).
- Buddhavacana: A Pali Reader (Onalaska, Wash: Pariyatti Press, 2011).
- Basic Teachings of the Buddha (New York: Random House, Modern Library, 2007).
- The Dhammapada: Verses on the Way (New York: Random House, Modern Library, 2004).
- Mediating the Power of Buddhas: Ritual in the Mañjuśrīmūlakalpa (Albany: State University of New York Press, 2002).

Articles

- "The Story of Anarchist Violence." The Anarchist Library, 2020.
- "Criticism Matters: A Response to Rick Repetti," in Ronald E. Purser, David Forbes, Adam Burke (eds.), Handbook of Mindfulness: Culture, Context, and Social Engagement (Basel: Springer International Publishing, 2016): 495–504.
- "Nascent Speculative Non-Buddhism." Journal for the Study of Religions and Ideologies 12 (35), (Summer 2013): 222–247.
- "om vakya da namah: Mañjuśrī’s mantra and its Use in Historical Perspective," in Edward Arnold (ed.), As Long As Space Endures: Essays on the Kalachakra Tantra in Honor of H.H. the Dalai Lama (Ithaca: Snow Lion Publications, 2009): 169–178.
- "Gautama vs. the Buddha." Buddhadharma: The Practitioner’s Quarterly 8 (2), (Winter 2009): 68–73.
- "The All." Buddhadharma: The Practitioner’s Quarterly 7 (2), (Winter 2008): 78–79.
- "The Buddha Counsels a Theist: A Reading of the Tevijjasutta" (Dighanikaya 13)." Religion 38 (2008): 54–67.
- "Advayavajra's Instructions on the adikarma." Pacific World: Journal of the Institute of Buddhist Studies 5 (Fall 2004): 203–230.
- "The Buddha’s Remains: mantra in the Mañjuśrīmūlakalpa," Journal of the International Association of Buddhist Studies 24, (2001): 89–125.
- "On Anarchism and Emma Goldman," (with John Kendall Hawkins). The Anarchist Library, 2020.
- "A Simple Idea" The Anarchist Library, 2021.

Online flipbook tracts

- Raw Remarks on Meditation, Ideology, and Nihilism
- A Non-Buddhist Encounter with the Void
- Non-Buddhist Disidentification
- Spectral Discourse
- Witch's Flight
- Trash Theory: Preliminary Materials for a Non-Buddhist Image of Practice
- Sutras of Flesh and Blood
- Stranger Sutra
- Buddhofictions
- Heresy: A Non-Buddhist Guide
- A Non-Buddhist Argument for Animal Liberation. (First published at Tricycle: The Buddhist Review, November 2023. )
