= Pagan Babies (punk band) =

American punk band

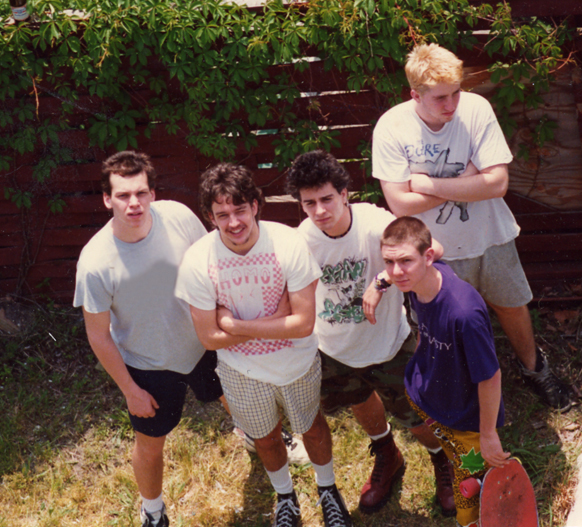
- The band in 1987

Background information
- Origin: Philadelphia, Pennsylvania, U.S.
- Genres: Hardcore punk
- Years active: 1986–1989 (original line-up); 2011–present
- Labels: Positive Force, Hawker, Rave, DRP
- Members: Alex Bovone; Dan McGinnis; Michael J. McManus; Eric Perfect; Mark Pingitore
- Past members: Bruce Boyd; Eric Squadroni

Pagan Babies is an American hardcore punk band from Philadelphia, Pennsylvania. They have been active with their current line-up since January, 2011. The release of Nazi Is Through in February 2019 marked the first recording with their longest-active line-up. Their energy is still on full-display in their live performances playing shows with bands like the Adicts, Slapshot, Alone in a Crowd, Maximum Penalty, Terror, Evacuate, and Ruin, among others.

== History ==
Founded by Michael J. McManus, vocals and lyrics, Eric Squadroni, lead guitar, Mark Pingitore, bass, Dan McGinnis, rhythm guitar, and Bruce Boyd, drums. From their first practices in the Fall of 1986 to their last shows in the Winter of 1989, the Pagan Babies were an active and influential band in the hardcore/punk community. The Pagan Babies fused hardcore punk, with rap and hip hop. The graffiti styled album art work was created by the drummer Bruce Boyd, and later drummer/DJ for the San Francisco band Grotus.

In 1987, they recorded their first record titled Immaculate Conception. The eight song 7 inch was released on Positive Force Records. In 1988, they were signed to Hawker Records, a division of Roadrunner Records, and released their only full-length album record titled Next. Their songs also appeared on compilation albums.

The original line-up performed its final show in a one time reunion in 2007 along with other Philadelphia punk bands YDI, Flag of Democracy, Decontrol and McRad. In 2010, they replaced the original drummer (Bruce Boyd) for a promotional show in support of their anthology CD/DVD "LAST" (released on DRP records) which included a documentary film produced and directed by the band's original lead guitar player Eric Squadroni.

Still active with a supportive base, Pagan Babies continues to play numerous shows a year in both support band and a headliner capacity. Notably, they have supported the Adicts, Slapshot, Alone in a Crowd, Maximum Penalty, Terror, Evacuate and Ruin, and co-headlined the 2019 Savage Mountain Punk Festival in Frostburg, Maryland.

== Discography ==
- 2019 – Nazi Is Through (self-released), single
- 2019 – My Life (self-released), single
- 2010 – Last (DRP Records), anthology CD/DVD
- 1988 – Next (Hawker Records), album
- 1987 – Wear and Tear (Red Rhino/Cartel, England, 1987), compilation
- 1987 – Discpan Hands (Rave Records 1987), compilation of Philadelphia punk bands
- 1987 – Immaculate Conception (Positive Force Records 1987), 7" EP
