= Beach Slang =

American rock band (2013–2021)

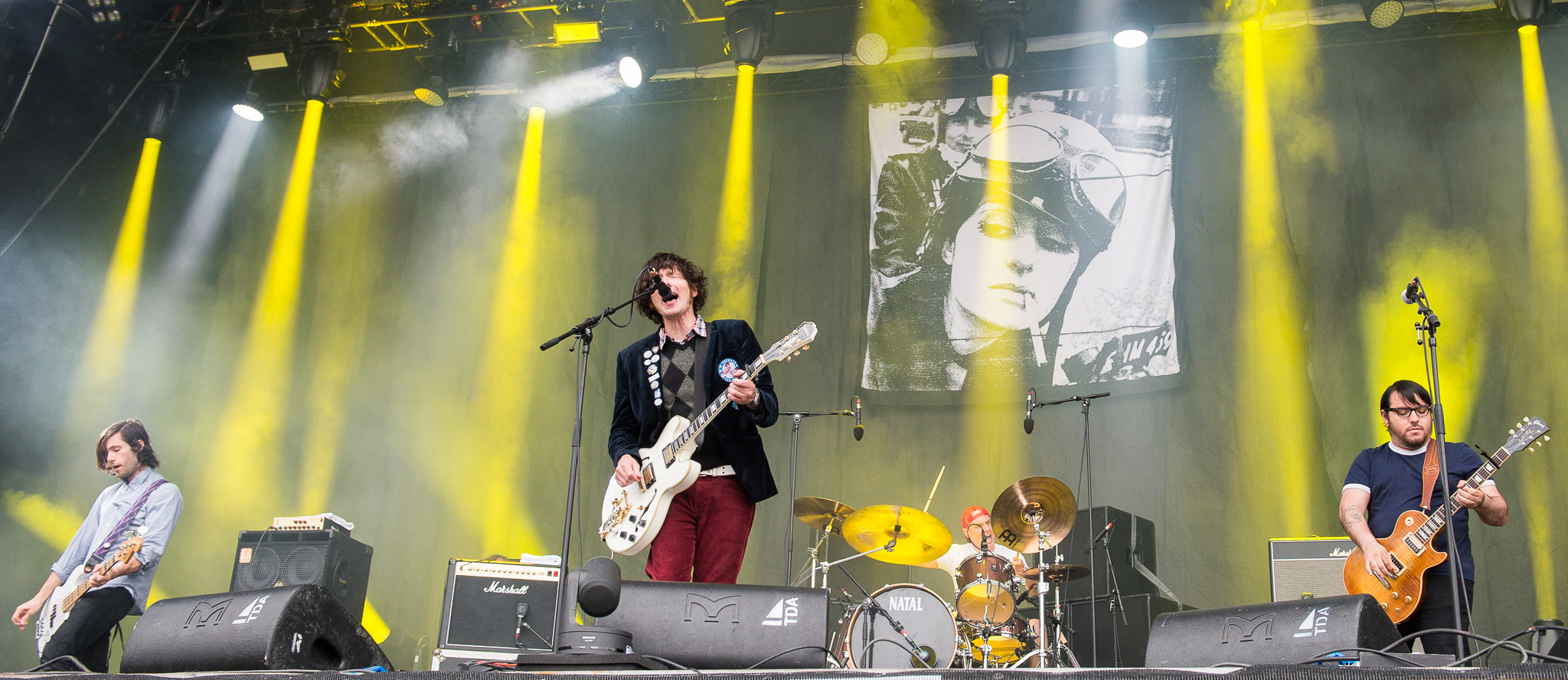
- Beach Slang performing in 2016

Background information
- Origin: Philadelphia, Pennsylvania
- Genres: Indie rock; punk rock; pop punk
- Years active: 2013–2021
- Labels: Dead Broke; Bridge 9; Tiny Engines; Polyvinyl; Lame-O; Big Scary Monsters; John Varvatos; Dew Process
- Past members: James Alex; Aurore Ounjian; Scott Schoenbeck; Gee Lima; Spencer Dorsey; Dan Metzker; JP Flexner; Ruben Gallego; Ed McNulty; Cully Symington
- Website: beachslang.com

Beach Slang was an American rock band from Philadelphia formed in May 2013. The band underwent several line-up changes, with lead vocalist/guitarist James Alex serving as the band's leader, figurehead, chief songwriter and sole original member.

== History ==
=== Early years and The Things We Do to Find People Who Feel Like Us (2013–2015) ===
Beach Slang formed in June 2013. In June 2014, they played their first live shows and released a 7-inch EP titled Who Would Ever Want Anything So Broken? via Dead Broke Records. They followed that release in October 2014 with their second EP titled Cheap Thrills on a Dead End Street via Tiny Engines.

Beach Slang started out with a string of live, lead guitarists; Spencer Dorsey of the band No Summer and Dan Metzker of the band The Danger O's. In February 2015, Beach Slang released a split along with five other bands titled Strength in Weakness via Lame-O Records.

Shortly before the recording of the band's first full-length LP, the band added Ruben Gallego as its permanent lead guitarist. Their debut full-length album, The Things We Do to Find People Who Feel Like Us, was released on October 30, 2015.

=== A Loud Bash of Teenage Feelings and line-up changes (2016–2018) ===
In April 2016, Beach Slang apparently broke up on stage at a show in Salt Lake City. James told the crowd it was their last show and asked the venue to refund the audience's ticket money. Ruben slammed his guitar down and walked off stage during the incident. Just over a month later, drummer JP Flexner was kicked out of the band after being blamed for causing James' on-stage meltdown in Salt Lake City. Recorded with Flexner, prior to his departure, the band released its second studio album, A Loud Bash of Teenage Feelings, in September 2016.

In October 2016, the band parted ways with guitarist Ruben Gallego. That December, the band officially replaced Flexner and Gallego with two new members: former Mean Creek guitarist Aurore Ounjian and former Afghan Whigs and Cursive drummer Cully Symington.

Alex began his side project Quiet Slang as a way to reinterpret some Beach Slang material and to create new music of a different stripe. In October 2017, Alex released the EP We Were Babies & We Were Dirtbags, which contains 4 acoustic reworkings of previously released songs.

=== Everything Matters But No One Is Listening and The Deadbeat Bang of Heartbreak City (2018–2020) ===
A full Quiet Slang album, Everything Matters But No One Is Listening, was released in May 2018, and Alex went on a supporting tour. He described his inspiration for the project succinctly in an interview: "If Beach Slang is me fawning over The Replacements, Quiet Slang is me head-over-heels for Stephin Merritt (The Magnetic Fields). And, really, that's all it is. I mean, the first time I heard a Magnetic Fields record, I was completely knocked out. I wanted to deconstruct it, to figure it out. All of a sudden, I felt like rock ‘n’ roll could be tender, but still mean it just as much".

On October 14, 2019, the band announced their third studio album, The Deadbeat Bang of Heartbreak City. Its lead single, "Bam Rang Rang," was released the same day. The album was released on January 10, 2020.

=== Emotional abuse allegations and split (2021) ===
On January 5, 2021, James Alex was accused of emotional abuse by the band's former manager and tour manager, Charlie Lowe. The band's social media pages went offline the following day.

On January 12, 2021, a statement was published on the band's Instagram account, stating that James Alex's behaviour was a result of "severe mental health issues" and that the band had split up. It also states that he is currently "an inpatient facility after attempting to take his life".

== Previous bands ==
The members of Beach Slang all participated in various bands and projects in their time as musicians.

- James Alex was previously a member of the band Weston between 1992 and 2011, and Cordova Academy Glee Club from 2005 to 2009.
- Ed McNulty was a member of Crybaby from 2012 until 2015.
- JP Flexner was previously a member of the band Ex Friends from 2011 to 2014, and No Summer from 2013 to 2014. He has also served as a touring drummer for the band Worriers, filling in for Mikey Erg.
- Ruben Gallego was previously a member of the band Glocca Morra.
- Spencer Dorsey is a solo artist and also formerly of the band No Summer alongside Flexner, self-releasing his music through his label Twin Wasp.
- Dan Metzker was a member of Philadelphia band The Danger O's.
- Cully Symington was the drummer for Cursive between 2009 and 2018, and has since joined the band Sparta.
- Aurore Ounjian was the lead guitarist in Mean Creek from 2006 to 2015.
- Tierney Tough is the lead singer and chief songwriter in The Pauses, and has also played in War On Women and in the backing band of Matt Pond PA.
- Dan Crotts was the drummer in Nashville band Brave Town.
- John Herguth has played in bands such as AciD, Rocketscience and The Love Scene. He has also released solo music under the project name Atlantic/Pacific.
- Scott Schoenbeck was originally in the bands, Self Denial, Cleveland Bound Death Sentence, Alligator Gun, and The Promise Ring before joining Dashboard Confessional in 2002.
- Benjamin Clapp is the Junk Percussionist for Skeleton Key.
- Gee Lima served as the drummer for Anthem Grief, Behind Deadlines, and Lost In Society before his tenure in Beach Slang; he was also a founding member of Philadelphia bands Lions Of West Texas and Common Crime.

== Band members ==
Final lineup

- James Alex – lead vocals, lead guitar (2013–2021)
- Aurore Ounjian – rhythm guitar, backing vocals (2016–2021)
- Scott Schoenbeck – bass (2019–2021)
- Gee Lima – drums (2019–2021)

Former members

- Spencer Dorsey – guitar (2013)
- Dan Metzker – guitar (2013)
- JP Flexner – drums (2013–2016)
- Ruben Gallego – guitar (2013–2016)
- Ed McNulty – bass (2013–2018)
- Arik Dayan – drums (2017–2017)
- Cully Syminton – drums (2017–2019)
- Tierney Tough – bass, backing vocals (2018)
- Dan Crotts – drums (2018)
- Maura Weaver – bass (2019)
- John Herguth – bass (2019)
- Jason Draper – bass (2019)
- Benjamin Clapp – drums (2019)

Timeline

== Discography ==
Studio albums

- The Things We Do to Find People Who Feel Like Us (2015)
- A Loud Bash of Teenage Feelings (2016)
- Everything Matters But No One Is Listening (2018, released under Quiet Slang)
- The Deadbeat Bang of Heartbreak City (2020)

EPs

- Who Would Ever Want Anything So Broken? (2014)
- Cheap Thrills on a Dead End Street (2014)
- Here I Made This for You: Volume 1 (2016)
- Here I Made This for You: Volume 2 (2017)
- We Were Babies & We Were Dirtbags (2017, released under Quiet Slang)

Compilations

- Broken Thrills (2015) [compilation of both 2014 EPs]

Compilation appearances

- Strength in Weakness (2015, Lame-O Records) inc. "Too Late to Die Young"
- "About a Girl" (originally by Nirvana; tribute album Doused in Mud, Soaked in Bleach) (2016, Robotic Empire)
