= Ruin (punk band) =

American punk band

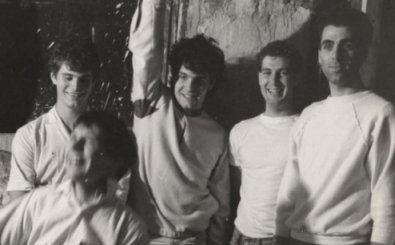
- Left to right: Paul Della Pelle, Thomas Adams, Cordy Swope, Damon Wallis, Glenn Wallis

Background information
- Origin: Philadelphia, Pennsylvania, U.S.
- Genres: Punk rock; psychedelic rock; hard rock
- Years active: 1980–1986, 1996–2016
- Labels: Red; Shanachie; Black Hole; Southern Lord
- Members: Thomas Adams (vocals); Richard Hutchins (drums); Paul Della Pelle (drums); Cordy Swope (bass); Damon Wallis (guitar); Glenn Wallis (guitar)
- Website: ruinrocks.com'

Ruin is an American punk band from Philadelphia. Their first live shows and recordings date to 1980, with founders Damon Wallis and Glenn Wallis on guitars, Steve Marasco on bass, and J.R. Arters on drums. By 1982, the lineup of Ruin was largely settled: Vosco (Thomas Adams) on vocals, Cordy Swope on bass, the Wallis brothers on guitars, and Richard Hutchins on drums. Paul Della Pelle became the drummer when Hutchins left the band in 1984. All six members played the so-called "ReUnIoN" shows in 1996, 1997, 2013, and 2016.

== History ==
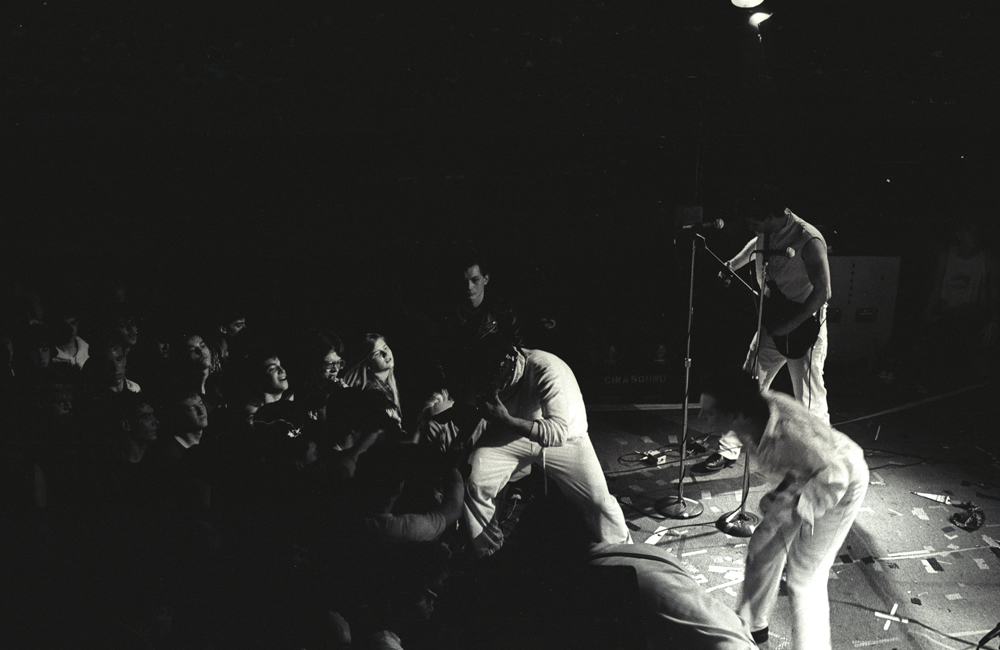
Ruin performing at the Trocadero Theatre in Philadelphia, 1986

As teenagers inspired by the eruption of the American and British punk movement, the Wallis brothers and Adams began writing songs together around 1978. Several songs that became fixtures of Ruin's performances date to this early period, including their revved-up covers of Leonard Cohen. (Note: Leonard Cohen commented approvingly on Ruin's cover of his "Master Song:" “On this new album by Ruin, they sing the first verse of the ‘Master Song’ more or less as I sing it, but then they bring this world to it of every sound you ever heard and murder it, but as it should be murdered. It’s a clean killing” (SPIN Magazine, August 1985, Volume one, Number four, p. 27).) In what became a hallmark of Ruin, the early Wallis-Adams songs, while loyal to the hyper-rhythms and aggressive delivery of early punk and later hardcore, were just as likely to evoke the melancholia of American folk music or the frantic jam quality of psychedelic rock. Incoming bassist Cordy Swope added elements of 1960s British invasion and American underground art rock to the band's mix of styles. This eclecticism became a defining feature of the Philadelphia underground music scene of the 1980s and beyond, an environment that contributed to Ruin's success. American author and urbanist Adam Greenfield noted: "Philadelphia threw nothing but curveballs. McRad, The Dead Milkmen, Pagan Babies, Scram: none of them quite fit the template, somehow. They were too weird, too goofy, too unpredictable, too hard to fit into the categories that were already then beginning to solidify." Illustrating Ruin's own eclecticism, Greenfield adds, "Which brings us at last to Ruin...If you were lucky enough to see them play, you never forgot it. There were rugs. There were, no lie, candles. The band filtered onto the stage dressed in white from head to toe. The message was unmistakable: whatever it was you were about to witness, it wasn’t going to be yet another clutch of Black Flag wannabes, sounding off about their petty beefs with still pettier authorities."

According to Pulitzer Prize-nominated rock critic Ken Tucker, by 1984 Ruin had established itself as "one of the most promising bands" in the Philadelphia region, "an ambitious group unto something new—a striking synthesis of rock styles." By 1986, Ruin had become "one of the most beloved bands in the history of Philly," according to Maximum Rocknroll's Stacey Finney. WKDU deejay Mike Eidle has gone as far as to call them "the best Philly band ever."

== "First Buddhist Punk Band" ==
Reviews of Ruin have suggested it is a uniquely "spiritual" band. Glenn Wallis has vigorously rejected this label, insisting that the entire focus of the band was the "perfectly ordinary" nature of everyday reality, but the characterization has been repeated. It was brought up in the very first Philadelphia Inquirer review of a Ruin performance: "Ruin propounds an aggressively thoughtful philosophy with roots in a clear-eyed, unsentimental Eastern mysticism... As someone who usually finds such obtrusive gestures corny or pretentious, I was surprised to hear how successfully Ruin managed to combine harsh music with a lucid spiritualism."

A decade before the advent of Krishnacore or other acceptable displays of "spirituality" in the typically brutal American underground scene, Ruin was being called a "Buddhist punk band." While, according to Adams, it is true that five of the six members of Ruin were practicing Buddhists during the period of formation, Wallis argues that the label is misapplied in that the band as a whole eschewed the proselytizing that it suggests.

Ruin employed theatrical elements that were alien to punk rock's aesthetic of unadorned simplicity. In an interview, Adams has said that it is understandable that they were mistaken for "mysticism", "spirituality", or Buddhist quietism, though they have more in common with Antonin Artaud's Theatre of Cruelty or Guy Debord's Situationist International. Bassist Cordy Swope, in an interview with Shambhala Sun Magazine (now called Lion's Roar), described this theatricality and the intention behind it this way:

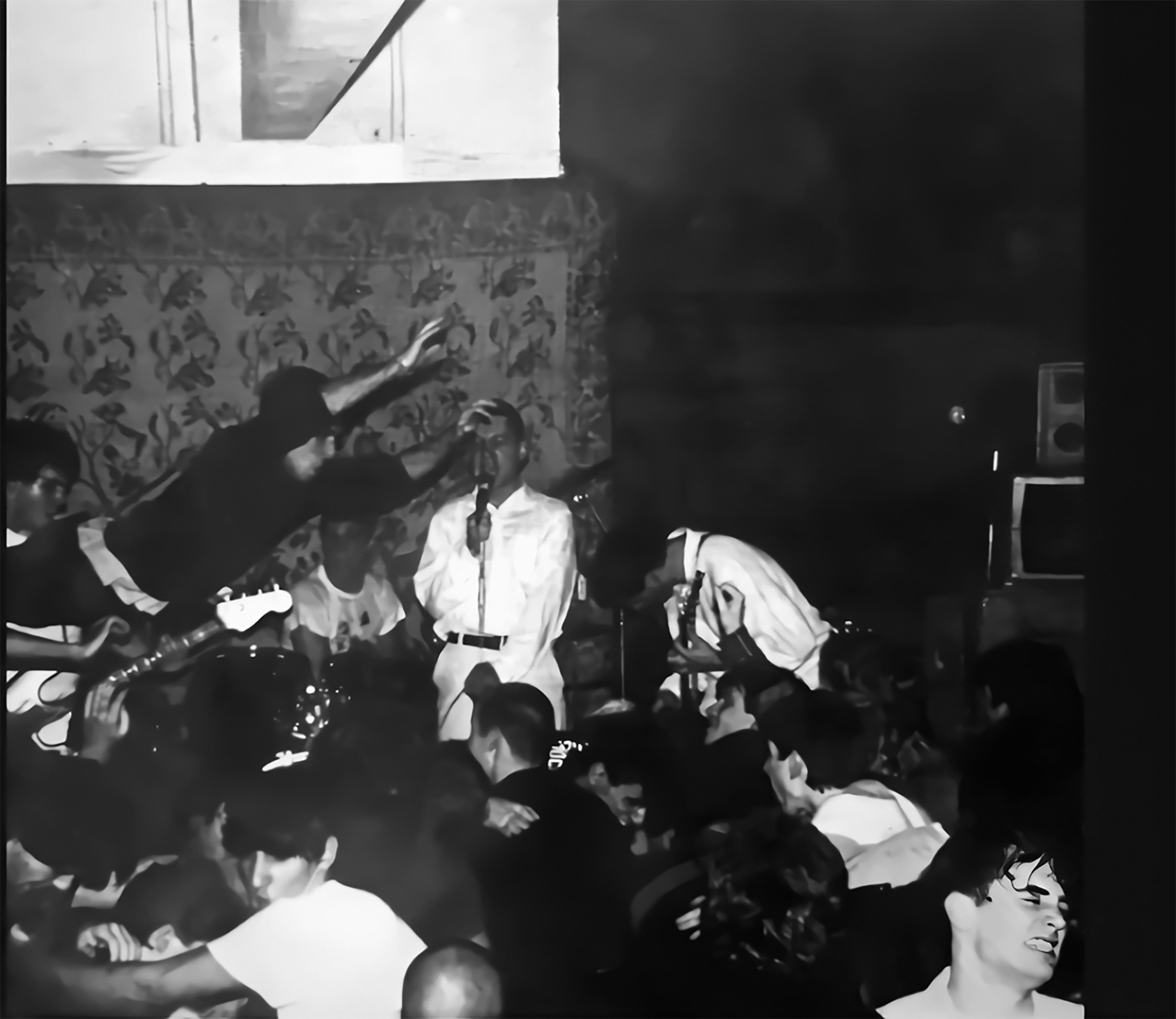
Ruin at St. Mary's Church, Philadelphia, PA, 1982

Ruin investigated ways in which to dissolve artificial barriers between people. One obvious one was between "audience" and "performer," in the punk rock context. We did things like dressing in white and turning the lights down in order to reduce the individual, ego-assertive aspect of "performing" in favor of the communal, cathartic qualities of what we imagined a Dionysian frenzy might have felt like. We gave the "audience" sparklers to wave around in the dark—a means of participation that anyone could interpret as they liked. We sprinkled pamphlets about ideas we had (rather than about judgmental declarations) in the often highly mannered atmosphere of punk rock shows. These small acts created openings for people to commune with each other, and became alternate channels of "engaging" people as well as for moving ourselves.

== Members ==
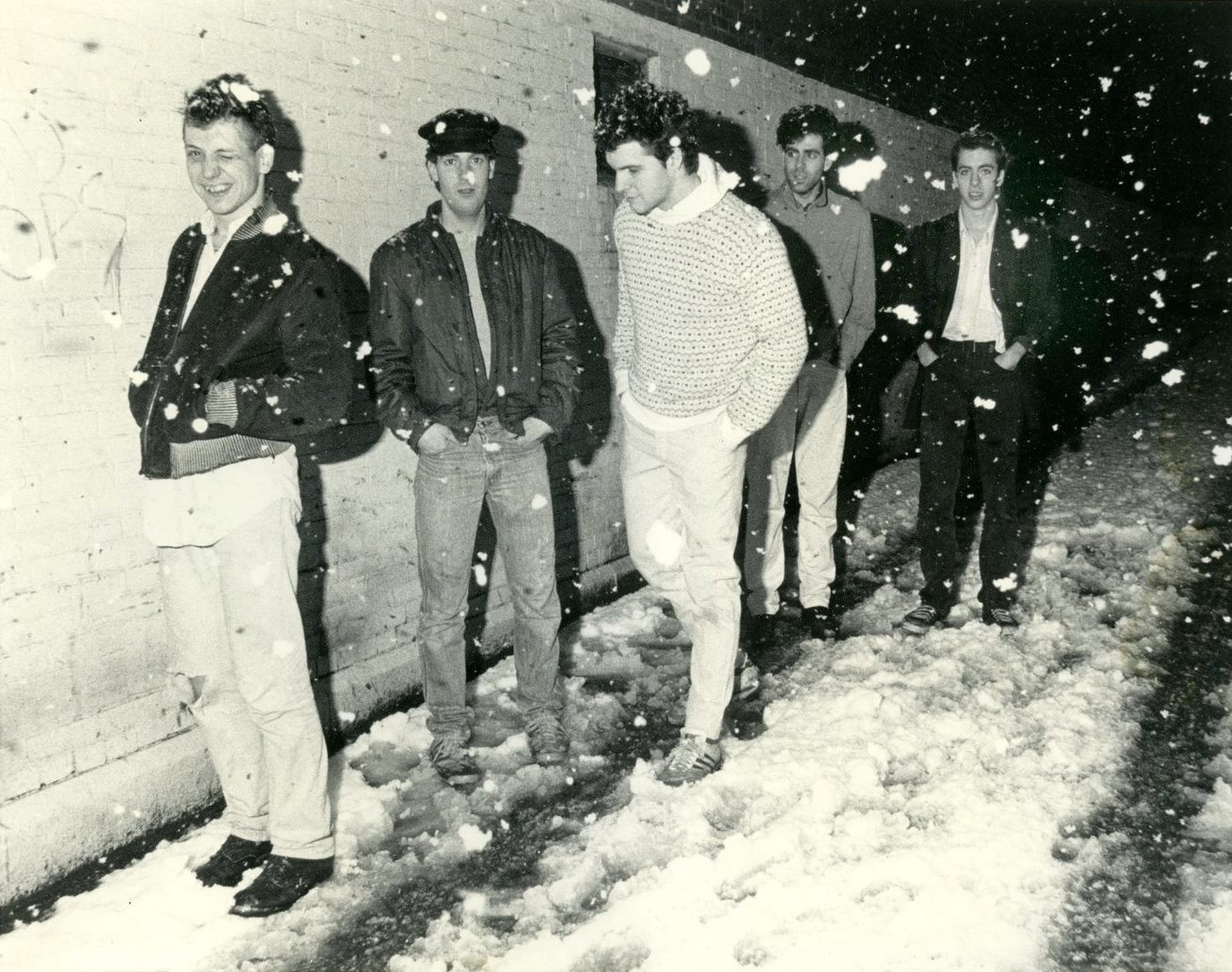
Left to right: Thomas Adams, Damon Wallis, Cordy Swope, Glenn Wallis, Richard Hutchins. Burlington, Vermont, 1984.

- Vosco Thomas Adams, vocals. Previously played with Physical Push and Sensory Fix. Subsequently, played with Fox in Sox, Open Minded Men (with Darren Finizio), and as a solo artist at the Philadelphia Fringe Festival.
- Paul Della Pelle, drums. Subsequently, played or recorded with Helios Creed, Jello Biafra and the Guantanamo School of Medicine, and Nik Turner of Hawkwind, and produced or directed several films.
- Richard Hutchins, drums. Subsequently, played or recorded with numerous bands in New York City and Los Angeles, such as Live Skull, Digitalis, Sugartime, Hungry March Band, Phideaux, and Of Cabbages and Kings, Lubricated Goat, Art Gray Noizz Quintet, and Shilpa Ray.
- Cordy Swope, bass. Previously played with Philadelphia bands Red Buckets, No Milk, and Ecstatics, and Boston band Alley Beats.
- Damon Wallis, lead guitar.
- Glenn Wallis, rhythm guitar.

=== Managers ===
- Carol Schutzbank (1961–1995). Manager from 1982-1984. Schutzbank was "a prime mover on the Philadelphia underground rock." She co-founded and edited the "seminal East Coast fanzine" B-Side magazine, and founded the Delaware Valley Music Poll Awards.
- Lee Paris (1954–1986; born Lee Salmons). Manager from 1984–1985. The "energetic, frequently frenetic and occasionally tasteless tastemaker" Paris is a "legendary" figure in Philadelphia music. His late-Sunday-night radio show on WXPN, Yesterday's Now Music Today (co-hosted with Roid Kafka), was the Philadelphia area's "first significant new music program."
- David Wildman (1955-1987). Manager from 1985–1987.
- Dennis McHugh. Manager through the ReUnIoN years, 1996–2016.

== Discography ==
- Terminal! Magazine, soundsheet (1982)
- Get Off My Back: We’re Doing It Ourselves, Philadelphia Hardcore Compilation. 1983.
- He-Ho, album released by Red Records. Produced by Bob Bell. 1984.
- That Was Then This Is Now! Four-song 7" compilation. Engineered, co-produced by Marc Bryan. 1985.
- White Rabbit promotional cassette single. Engineered by Dan McKay and Marc Bryan. 1985.
- Fiat Lux, album, released by Shanachie Records. Produced and Engineered by Mark Springer. 1986.
- Songs of Reverie and Ruin, released by Black Hole Records; CD re-issue compilation of selections from recording sessions of previous releases. Remastered by Jon Lovrich. 1996. Notes: "Master Song" and "Famous Blue Raincoat" written by Leonard Cohen; "Play with Fire" written by Jagger/Richards; White Rabbit written by Jefferson Airplane; "Hero" covered by Superchunk, "The Laughter Guns" (1996); “Great Divide" covered by Northern Liberties, "Secret Revolution" (2006).
- Carbon 14 Magazine–Legends of Philly Punk 4 song 7″ EP. Remixed by Jon Lovrich. 1997.
- Ruin Killed: Live at Union Transfer 08.31.13, DVD. Shot by Woodshop Films. 2013.
- He-Ho/Fiat Lux, double vinyl record reissue by Southern Lord Records. Re-engineered by Bob Ferbrache. 2016.
- RUIN... Collective. Includes "Tone Poems," new individual tracks, and live tracks.
