= Plow United =

American punk rock band

- Origin: Wilmington, Delaware, U.S.
- Genres: Punk rock, melodic hardcore
- Years active: 1992–1998, 2011–present
- Labels: Creep, Coolidge, Blackout
- Members: Brian McGee (guitar, vocals); Sean Rule (drums); Joel Tannenbaum (bass)

Plow United is an American punk rock band formed in Wilmington, Delaware in 1992. They play fast punk rock with pop, thrashcore and hardcore influences. Their lyrics are sometimes labeled "emo". Band members are Brian McGee (vocals and guitar), Sean Rule (drums) and Joel Tannenbaum (bass).

== History ==
=== Formation and first three albums (1992–1998) ===
McGee, Rule and Tannenbaum met at a private high school in Wilmington, Delaware in 1989. In 1992, they formed a band called Plow and recorded two demo tapes ("Old Country Church Broadcast" and "Warped Sense of Humor"). They began playing shows in Delaware and Southeast Pennsylvania over the next 18 months.

In 1994, Tannenbaum moved to West Chester, Pennsylvania where the band played with other regional acts and began working with the newly started Creep Records (based in West Chester) and Coolidge Records (based in New Jersey). Plow changed its name to "Plow United" when a band of the same name from Baltimore, Maryland sent them a letter claiming rights to the name. A reproduction of the letter can be found inside the cover of their eponymous debut album, which Creep Records released that same year.

Plow United played continuously throughout the Northeastern United States from 1994 until 1997. Armed with their Coolidge and Creep releases, and coupled with their beloved van, Sadi, they also toured the United States multiple times, eventually taking their music as far as Canada. They shared lineups at shows with national acts like Lagwagon, At the Drive-In, Bouncing Souls and Good Riddance.

In 1996, the band recorded and released their second record ("Goodnight Sellout"), and received attention from major labels. They declined to pursue a career in rock and roll, however, and in 1997 the band broke up at the height of its popularity. In 1998 Creep Records released a posthumous third LP ("Narcolepsy"), a darker take on the band's loose, aggressive pop punk sound. In 1998, Plow United reformed to play three shows in New York and Pennsylvania to promote the release of "Narcolepsy".

=== Hiatus (1998–2010) ===
In 2000, Coolidge Records released a compilation of singles and other non-album tracks (The Dustbin of History).

McGee played in Throttle Jockey and briefly as a second guitarist in Super Hi-5 with Sid Carney, Arik Victor and Mike Bardzik. He attended John C. Campbell Folk School, Haywood Community College, and Penland School of Crafts. He lived for a time in North Carolina, where he was elected president of the North Carolina chapter of the WPA (Werewolf Protection Agency) . Brian played and recorded with his old school folk/bluegrass/country rock and roll band Brian McGee and the Hollow Speed from 2005 to 2010. After recording his latest album ("The Taking Or The Leaving"), McGee dropped the Hollow Speed tag and now performs his solo material under Brian McGee. Visit www.brianmcgeemusic.com for more information.

Tannenbaum moved on to indie pop bands – The Skywriters and The Snow Fairies – as well as recording a solo album "Music Should Be Seen and Not Heard" under the name The Whales on the Best Kept Secret tape label. He left Philadelphia in 2001 for long stints in The United Kingdom and Hawaii. He returned to Philadelphia in 2008. In 2010, he joined the indie-pop band Glitter, featuring members of The Skywriters, The Snow Fairies and The 500s. Around the time of the Plow United reunion, he started the band Ex Friends with designer and illustrator JP Flexner on drums.

Rule began teaching high school math in 1997 at Salesianum School and later became a math teacher at Central Oregon Community College. He played in the thrash band Hands On Throat, and also in the ska band Necktie Killer (both based in Bend, Oregon). From 1998 to 2011, the band received requests to play more shows, all of which were declined.

=== Reunion (2011–present) ===
On September 24, 2011, Plow United played their first show after an almost 13-year hiatus at the inaugural Riot Fest East at Penn's Landing in Philadelphia, Pennsylvania. Preceding Riot Fest East, the band came to an amicable agreement with Creep Records that allowed them to take control of their master tapes from the albums and re-release old material. A compilation LP ("Sleepwalk: A Retrospective"), on the Paper + Plastick label, was released for sale at Riot Fest East. In the time since Riot Fest, Plow United has played shows along the East Coast, including performances at Insubordination Fest 2012 in Baltimore, Maryland, and Fest 2012 in Gainesville, Florida. In early 2012, they did a three-day stint of support shows for Less Than Jake.

In Summer 2012, Plow United returned to the studio for the first time in 14 years to record new material. Twelve of the 17 tracks recorded at those sessions would comprise the full - length "Marching Band", which was released on April 2, 2013, on the Jump Start Label. Two other songs from that session were released as a 7-inch single on Kiss of Death Records. Two additional songs are slated for a split 7-inch release with Mikey Erg, and one other song appeared on the compilation "For the Shore" on Chance 4 Change Records. In March 2013, the band played a series of shows (including recording live on WXPN at Studio A in Philadelphia and performing live on The Chris Gethard Show) to support their new album, "Marching Band" released on the Jump Start label. They have more shows and festival appearances planned for spring and summer 2013.

== Discography ==
Studio albums

- Plow United CD/12" LP (Creep 10, 1995)
- Goodnight Sellout CD/12" LP (Creep 26, 1996)
  - 2005 remaster includes all songs from the first two albums
- Narcolepsy CD (Creep 40, 1998)
- Marching Band (2013)
- Three (2016)

Compilation albums

- The Dustbin of History compilation CD (Coolidge 32, 2000)
- Sleepwalk: A Retrospective CD (Paper + Plastic, 2011)
  - Compilation of remastered tracks and the previously unreleased "Monte."

Singles

- "Dance"/"Timmy Is an Arsonist"
- "Sadi"/"Break My Heart"/"Plow Beach" COOLIDGE 18
- "West Chester Rock City"/"Comeback"/The Beat Fades Quickly"/"No Parole"
- Transcend 7-inch EP (FOE Records 1998) with Christopher Neumann as Texas Criffer and the Bunny Humpers
  - Selling Pretty Poisons/Bottled Up/Road Less Traveled/Routine (Pot)

Split releases

- Tallman - "Reason"/"Sorority Girl"/"Firedogs Are Deaf
- Weston - "Christoph"/"Could You?" COOLIDGE 11
- Stressboy - "Yes, Sir!"/"Fuck Up"
- Throttle Jockey - "Backslider"/"Universal Ball"/"9MM"
- The Ick - "Last Call"/"Love Comes in Spurts"
