= Grotus =

American rock band

G̈r̈oẗus̈
- G̈r̈oẗus̈ in 1996

Background information
- Origin: San Francisco, California, U.S.
- Genres: Industrial rock; experimental rock
- Years active: 1989–1996
- Labels: Spirit Music Industries; Alternative Tentacles; London/Polygram
- Past members: Lars Fox; Adam Tanner; John Carson; Bruce Boyd

Grotus, stylized as G̈r̈oẗus̈, was an industrial rock band from San Francisco, active from 1989 to 1996. Their unique sound incorporated sampled ethnic instruments, two drummers, and two bassists, and featured angry but humorous lyrics.

== Biography ==
The group started in 1989, when Adam Tanner and John Carson, burned out from failed rock bands, decided to make music for films, and bought 2 Akai S950 samplers. Having technical difficulties, they asked their friend Lars Fox to help figure out how to use them, and Fox asserted himself as their singer. Their first songs came quickly, and the trio headed to Dancing Dog Studio in Emeryville, to record with David Bryson (soon to be a member of Counting Crows). A visit to radio station KUSF's local music show yielded an invitation to perform at a showcase within a few weeks of starting.

They developed a large dedicated following in San Francisco over the next two years, playing with their friends in Consolidated often, and opening for touring industrial bands, including Nine Inch Nails. New local record label Spirit Music Industries asked them to put out a recording, resulting in Brown, introducing the group's ethnic industrial stylings. Next, the group added drummer Bruce Boyd (formerly of Pagan Babies) to the mix, resulting in a more organic punk feel. The new line up released Luddite on Spirit, much more a live band now, as opposed to Brown's more classic industrial sequenced machine grooves.

Faith No More and Mr. Bungle singer Mike Patton championed the band, asking them to open for his band Mr. Bungle, joining them for the band's first US tour, in 1992. This led to Alternative Tentacles' Jello Biafra asking the band to join their roster, which they did, releasing what many fans feel to be their best work, Slow Motion Apocalypse, in 1993.

G̈r̈oẗus̈ toured relentlessly from 1993 to 1996, stopping only to record, essentially living in their van or rehearsal space. Many major labels were signing alternative bands in the early post-Nirvana era and were soon sought out. They eventually signed with London Records. London released the more rock oriented Mass in 1996, with a remix EP ("Handjob") being released as a touring device in 1995 (for a tour with Korn, on their first headlining tour).

London was primarily interested in the atypical (for G̈r̈oẗus̈) song "Hand to Mouth", but when it failed to catch on as a single, the label dropped the band two months later after Mass' release. After seven years of activity, the band decided to call it quits and disbanded. Lars Fox has since produced many releases and continues to do so.

Fox has become a specialized recording engineer "track surgeon" working on artists ranging from Nick Cave to Ashlee Simpson. He is best known for co-producing Everclear's last four albums. Tanner, a bluegrass enthusiast, tours around the U.S. and Europe playing mandolin, fiddle and guitar in various groups. Boyd moved to the Utah desert, and is metal director and D.J. at KZMU, in Moab, Utah. Carson lives in Portland, Oregon, and works as an electronic technician for a musical instrument manufacturer. His band TV616 disbanded in August 2006. Their last show was in Sabalas, Portland.

== Musical style ==
Projected videos, synchronized with the music, were an important part of the band from the beginning, influencing and being influenced by other Bay Area bands including Neurosis and Consolidated. Their shows included large projected videos sequenced with the songs. They could almost qualify as performance art, with lyrics channeling any number of issues involved in the subjects of the videos. Many of the songs had a level of social commentary and in particular dealt with anger at environmental collapse. The group's sound can be summarized as industrial, experimental and alternative rock (later) with elements of ethnic music via sampling and to a lesser extent, metal.

== Members ==
- Lars Fox – vocals, percussion, sampler (1989–1996)
- Adam Tanner – guitar, keyboards, 6-string bass guitar, sampler (1989–1996)
- John Carson – bass guitar, keyboards, sampler (1989–1996)
- Bruce Boyd – drums, turntables (1992–1996)

== Discography ==
=== Studio albums ===
- Brown (1991)
- Slow Motion Apocalypse (1993)
- Mass (1996)

=== EPs ===
- Brown Club Product (1992)
- Luddite (1992)
- Handjob (1995)

=== Remixes ===
- The Opiate of the Masses (1994) - Remix/Extended Play

=== Singles ===
- "Edward Abbey" (1991)
- "Mother of Pearl" (1991)
- "Hand to Mouth" (1995)

=== Live recordings ===
- Live in France (1994)
