= A Loud Bash of Teenage Feelings =

Studio album by Beach Slang
- Released: September 23, 2016
- Genre: Punk rock
- Length: 29:54
- Label: Polyvinyl (US); Big Scary Monsters (UK and Europe)
- Producer: Dave Downham

Beach Slang chronology
The Things We Do to Find People Who Feel Like Us (2015)	A Loud Bash of Teenage Feelings (2016)	Everything Matters But No One Is Listening (2018)

A Loud Bash of Teenage Feelings is the second studio album by the American punk rock band Beach Slang, released on September 23, 2016 on Polyvinyl and Big Scary Monsters.

Recorded and released in less than a year following the band's debut album, A Loud Bash of Teenage Feelings is the last studio album to feature both drummer JP Flexner, who left Beach Slang following its recording, and guitarist Ruben Gallego who departed shortly after its release.

Professional ratings
Aggregate scores
Source	Rating
Metacritic	80/100
Review scores
Source	Rating
AllMusic	3.5/5 stars

== Track listing ==
All tracks are written by James Alex.

No.	Title	Length
1.	"Future Mixtape for the Art Kids"	2:38
2.	"Atom Bomb"	1:59
3.	"Spin the Dial"	3:10
4.	"Art Damage"	2:42
5.	"Hot Tramps"	3:44
6.	"Punks in a Disco Bar"	2:41
7.	"Wasted Daze of Youth"	2:08
8.	"Young Hearts"	4:10
9.	"The Perfect High"	4:02
10.	"Warpaint"	2:40
