= B-Side (magazine) =

Defunct American usic magazine

- Editor: Sandra A. Garcia
- Categories: Music magazines
- Frequency: Bi-monthly magazines
- Circulation: 30,000
- Publisher: Sandra C. Davis, Sandra A. Garcia
- Founder: Sandra C. Davis, Sandra A. Garcia, Carol Schutzbank
- Founded: 1986
- First issue: 1 November 1986
- Final issue Number: 1 July 1996; 57
- Country: United States
- Based in: Fort Washington, Pennsylvania, United States Burlington, New Jersey, United States
- Language: English
- OCLC: 29807340

B-Side was a bi-monthly American alternative rock-and-roll magazine published from 1986 to 1996, based in the Philadelphia area. It placed particular emphasis on goth and industrial artists.

== History ==
B-Side magazine, described by MTV as an "seminal East Coast fanzine," was founded by Sandra. C. Davis, Sandra A. Garcia, and Carol Schutzbank in 1986. Garcia and Davis met Schutzbank through their work contributing to Terminal!, an earlier Philadelphia fanzine that had folded. They all held multiple roles with the new publication. Davis and Garcia were the publishers and art directors, later relabeled Design Direction. Davis was also the photo editor and principal photographer. Garcia was the executive managing editor and a writer. Schutzbank, who handled ad sales, marketing, and publicity, was also the senior contributing editor and a writer. Schutzbank was a fixture of the Philadelphia music scene; in addition to her work on B-Side, she also managed local bands such as Ruin and she co-producer the Delaware Valley Music Poll Awards. Garcia took over as advertising manager following Schutzbank's 1995 death.

Content in the bi-monthly publication included artist interviews, concert reviews, album reviews and overviews of festivals such as the New Music Seminar, South by Southwest, and the Reading Festival. It featured both editorial coverage and advertisements for major and independent label artists. Although other music alternative magazines also covered the music that was most popular on college radio and MTV's 120 Minutes in its era, B-Side carved a unique identity with an emphasis on goth and industrial music, evidenced by multiple cover stories on Gene Loves Jezebel, Ministry, and Skinny Puppy, and early championing of Nine Inch Nails. Ministry manager Jon Zarzula commented that, with regard to credibility with fans, "I'd rather be in B-Side than Rolling Stone." With three women at the top of its masthead and well represented among contributors, the magazine provided more coverage of female artists than was typical among music magazines of the period. For example, Siouxsie Sioux graced the cover three times, twice with Siouxsie & the Banshees and once with the Creatures. Garcia and Davis demonstrated their background and skill in graphic design in the magazine's layout.

B-Side produced 57 issues with improved production quality over its nearly 10-year run. The first dozen were black and white tabloids. With the February/March 1989 issue, it switched to a staple-bound format, still on black and white newsprint, but with a colored border around the glossy cover. It added a full color cover in December 1990/January 1991 and color interior pages in 1993. Circulation peaked at 30,000. Although primarily distributed in the U.S. and Canada, Tower Records carried it in their London stores. The magazine is still held by at least 14 libraries.

Publication was based in the Philadelphia area, initially in the suburb of Fort Washington, PA before jumping across the Delaware River to Burlington, NJ in 1990. Although many contributors were Philadelphia-based, from the start the roster included UK-based writer Andy Darlington, and the masthead soon credited contributors based in New York, Los Angeles, Chicago, and elsewhere, eventually including Toronto and Iceland. Staff included writers Joey Sweeney, who started writing while still in high school and before landing a column for Philadelphia Weekly and co-founding Philebrity.com; Bruce Warren, who was already a DJ at WXPN, where he would eventually be named Program Director; and Chicago-based photographer Bobby Talamine.

The magazine ceased publication in 1996.

== List of Issues ==
Issue Cover Stories
Issue No.	Issue Date	Artist
1	Nov/Dec 1986	Cabaret Voltaire
2	Feb/Mar 1987	Gene Loves Jezebel
3	Apr/May 1987	Love and Rockets
4	Jun/Jul 1987	Peter Murphy
5	Aug/Sep 1987	The Mission U.K.
6	Oct/Nov 1987	Wire
7	Dec 1987/Jan 1988	Gene Loves Jezebel
8	Feb/Mar 1988	The Bolshoi
9	Apr/May 1988	Flesh for Lulu
10	Jun/Jul 1988	Robyn Hitchcock
11	Aug/Sep 1988	Love and Rockets
12	Oct/Nov 1988	The Sugarcubes
13	Feb/Mar 1989	Siouxsie & the Banshees
14	Apr/May 1989	Ministry
15	Jun/Jul 1989	New Model Army
16	Aug/Sep 1989	The Fall
18	Dec 1989/Jan 1990	The B-52s
19	Feb/Mar 1990	Peter Murphy
20	Apr/May 1990	The Creatures
21	Jun/Jul 1990	Nine Inch Nails
22	Aug/Sep 1990	Revenge
22	Aug/Sep 1990	Ryuichi Sakamoto
23	Oct/Nov 1990	Gene Loves Jezebel
24	Dec 1990/Jan 1991	Skinny Puppy
25	Feb/Mar 1991	Front 242
26	Apr/May 1991	Sisters of Mercy
27	Jun/Jul 1991	Jesus Jones
28	Aug/Sep 1991	Pigface
29	Oct/Nov 1991	Psychedelic Furs
30	Dec 1991/Jan 1992	Nitzer Ebb
31	Feb/Mar 1992	Ministry
32	Apr/May 1992	The Church
33	Jun/Jul 1992	Curve
34	Aug/Sep 1992	Front Line Assembly
35	Oct/Nov 1992	Skinny Puppy
36	Dec 1992/Jan 1993	Medicine
37	Feb/Mar 1993	The The
38	Apr/May 1993	Jesus Jones
39	Jun/Jul 1993	New Model Army
40	Aug/Sep 1993	An Emotional Fish
41	Oct/Nov 1993	Front 242
41	Oct/Nov 1993	Juliana Hatfield
41	Oct/Nov 1993	Tool
41	Oct/Nov 1993	Truman's Water
42	Dec 1993/Jan 1994	Curve
42	Dec 1993/Jan 1994	Dead Can Dance
43	Feb/Mar 1994	Nine Inch Nails
44	Apr/May 1994	Tori Amos
45	Jun/Jul 1994	Autechre
45	Jun/Jul 1994	Cabaret Voltaire
45	Jun/Jul 1994	The Orb
46	Aug/Sep 1994	Luscious Jackson
47	Oct/Nov 1994	Love and Rockets
48	Dec 1994/Jan 1995	The Cranberries
49	Feb/Mar 1995	Siouxsie & the Banshees
50	May/Jun 1995	50th issue collage
51	Jul/Aug 1995	Radiohead
52	Sep/Oct 1995	David Bowie
53	Nov/Dec 1995	Alanis Morissette
54	Jan/Feb 1996	Julian Cope
55	Mar/Apr 1996	Gavin Friday
56	May/Jun 1996	Tori Amos
57	Jul/Aug 1996	James Hall
