= The Things We Do to Find People Who Feel Like Us =

Studio album by Beach Slang
- Released: October 30, 2015
- Recorded: June 2015 at The Gradwell House, Haddon Heights, NJ
- Length: 26:52
- Labels: Polyvinyl Record Co., Big Scary Monsters (EU)
- Producer: Dave Downham

Beach Slang chronology
The Things We Do to Find People Who Feel Like Us (2015)	A Loud Bash of Teenage Feelings (2016)

The Things We Do to Find People Who Feel Like Us is the debut full-length album by American rock band Beach Slang, released on October 30, 2015, through Polyvinyl Record Co. and Big Scary Monsters in Europe.

== Critical reception ==
Professional ratings
Aggregate scores
Source	Rating
AnyDecentMusic?	7.8/10
Metacritic	78/100
Review scores
Source	Rating
AllMusic	3.5/5 stars
Alternative Press	4.5/5 stars
The A.V. Club	A−
Clash	8/10
Exclaim!	7/10
The Guardian	4/5 stars
Paste	8.8/10
Pitchfork	8.0/10
Rolling Stone	3.5/5 stars
Spin	7/10

The Things We Do to Find People Who Feel Like Us received mostly positive reviews from music critics. At Metacritic, which assigns a "weighted average" rating out of 100 from selected independent ratings and reviews from mainstream critics, the album received a score of 78 out of 100, based on 23 reviews, indicating "generally favorable reviews". Praising the album's hooks and lyrical work, Ian Gormely of Exclaim! called The Things We Do to Find People Who Feel Like Us "a unique record, one that rages with youthful vigour."

=== Accolades ===
Publication	Rank	List
American Songwriter	28	Top 50 Albums of 2015
The A.V. Club	7	The 15 Best Albums of 2015
Exclaim!	15	Top 20 Pop & Rock Albums of 2015
Noisey	15	The 50 Best Albums of 2015
No Ripcord	40	Top 50 Albums of 2015
Paste	41	The 50 Best Albums of 2015
Treble	45	The 50 Best Albums of 2015

== Track listing ==
All tracks are written by James Alex

No.	Title	Length
1.	"Throwaways"	2:15
2.	"Bad Art & Weirdo Ideas"	3:19
3.	"Noisy Heaven"	2:29
4.	"Ride the Wild Haze"	2:38
5.	"Too Late to Die Young"	2:33
6.	"I Break Guitars"	2:33
7.	"Young & Alive"	2:29
8.	"Porno Love"	2:42
9.	"Hard Luck Kid"	2:56
10.	"Dirty Lights"	2:57
Total length:		26:52

== Personnel ==
Credits adapted from AllMusic

Beach Slang

- James Alex — guitar, piano, vocals
- JP Flexner — drums
- Ruben Gallego — guitar
- Ed McNulty — bass

Other musicians

- Hannah Jordan — background vocals
- Megan Siebe — cello

Technical

- James Alex – production, artwork, design
- Dave Downham — engineer, production
- Alan Douches — mastering
- Mike Friedman – engineer
- Greg Pallante – photography
- Jon Stars – cover photo
- Matt Weber – assistant engineer

== Chart performance ==
Chart (2015)	Peak position
US Top Alternative Albums (Billboard)	19
US Heatseekers Albums (Billboard)	2
US Top Rock Albums (Billboard)	24

== Release history ==
Region	Date	Format(s)	Label
United States	October 30, 2015	CD; digital download; vinyl; cassette	Polyvinyl
