= The Deadbeat Bang of Heartbreak City =

Studio album by Beach Slang
- Released: January 11, 2020
- Length: 33:37
- Label: Bridge 9

Beach Slang chronology
Everything Matters But No One Is Listening (2018)	The Deadbeat Bang of Heartbreak City (2020)

Professional ratings
Aggregate scores
Source	Rating
Metacritic	59/100
Review scores
Source	Rating
AllMusic	2.5/5 stars
Exclaim	6/10
Kerrang!	3/5 stars
Pitchfork	5.2/10
Under the Radar	7.5/10

The Deadbeat Bang of Heartbreak City is the fourth and final studio album by American punk rock band Beach Slang. It was released on January 10, 2020, under Bridge 9 Records. In support of the album, the band announced a tour of North America with Goo Goo Dolls.

The first single from the album, "Bam Rang Rang" was released on October 14, 2019.

== Critical reception ==
The Deadbeat Bang of Heartbreak City was met with mixed or average reviews from critics. At Metacritic, which assigns a weighted average rating out of 100 to reviews from mainstream publications, this release received an average score of 59, based on 9 reviews.

== Track listing ==
The Deadbeat Bang of Heartbreak City track listing
No.	Title	Length
1.	"All the Kids in LA"	1:41
2.	"Let It Ride"	3:12
3.	"Bam Rang Rang"	3:33
4.	"Tommy in the 80s"	2:58
5.	"Nobody Say Nothing"	2:36
6.	"Nowhere Bus"	1:57
7.	"Stiff"	3:02
8.	"Born to Raise Hell"	2:17
9.	"Sticky Thumbs"	2:45
10.	"Kicking Over Bottles"	2:43
11.	"Bar No One"	6:53
