= Mean Creek (band) =

US musical group (2006–2015)

- Origin: Boston, Massachusetts, United States
- Genres: Indie rock, Power pop
- Years active: 2006–2015
- Past members: Mikey Holland; Chris Keene; Aurore Ounjian; Kevin Macdonald; Erik Wormwood
- Website: meancreek.tumblr.com

Mean Creek was a four-piece American rock band based in Boston, Massachusetts. Formed in 2006, the lineup consisted of Chris Keene (lead vocals, guitar), Aurore Ounjian (lead guitar, backing vocals), Mikey Holland (drums), and Kevin Macdonald (bass).

The band released four albums over the course of their career.

== History ==
=== Formation and name (2006) ===
Vocalists Chris Keene and Aurore Ounjian had previously toured together as a folk duo, before working together on what would later become Mean Creek. After adding drummer Mikey Holland and bassist Erik Wormwood in 2006, the lineup was complete. "This is the final incarnation of the band," says Holland. "We're going to release 10 records whether or not anyone gives a shit."

The band derives their name from the 2004 film starring Rory Culkin, stating that they related to the emotional overtures of the film. "We felt that the tone, and the mood of the movie fit the kind of music we wanted to write." Keene has said. "I saw the movie as being about how complicated people are, and how that can make us all feel alienated, alone, and confused a lot of the time. It can make us do crazy things, especially when you’re young and trying to figure out who you are and your place in the world."

=== Early years, Around the Bend (2007–2009) ===
Mean Creek’s first studio record utilized just Keene & Ounjian. "Keene and Ounjian released the band’s debut, Around the Bend in the fall of 2007, and drummer Mikey Holland and bassist Erik Wormwood (former members of the Boston grunge outfit Tulsa) joined up in time for their sophomore effort, 2009’s The Sky (Or the Underground)." The complete group toured with the bands Dead Confederate and Catfish Haven in 2008.

During 2009, Mean Creek appeared at the SXSW Music festival and toured with Cotton Jones, The Everyday Visuals, The Whigs, and The Features. During 2008, the band was listed as one of the "10 Bands to Check Out" by The Improper Bostonian, and was nominated for, "Outstanding Americana Act," by the Boston Music Awards.

=== Rising success, The Sky (Or the Underground) (2009–2010) ===
The 2009 release of The Sky (Or Underground) garnered the band critical success and favorable reviews, including a win as "New Act of the Year" at the Boston Music Awards. The Boston Globe said that it was "destined to be one of the best local releases of the year."

In July 2010, they released their new single (The Comedian) digitally and on limited edition 7" vinyl, and had four of their songs featured on the popular MTV show "Teen Mom."

Later that year, the band was dubbed "Boston’s Best Act" by The Boston Phoenix and nominated for "Song of the Year" and "Album of the Year" at the 2010 Boston Music Awards. During this time, Mean Creek toured with Bettie Serveert, and again with Dead Confederate.

=== Continued notoriety (2011) ===
2011 included a tour with the band Buffalo Tom, and another appearance at the SXSW Music festival.

The band released a 4-song EP, Hemophiliac (produced by John Agnello, known for his work with such acts as Sonic Youth, Dinosaur Jr., and The Hold Steady) as well as a new single, The Land Of Hopes & Dreams. The EP was originally intended to be a full-length release, but due to a loss of funding, the band was required to scale back and ended up personally financing it. It was then distributed via Bandcamp, where fans were able to download utilizing the "pay what you can" format popularized by such artists as Radiohead and Amanda Palmer. This decision was announced through their blog, where they stated "We were originally planning on going into the studio to record a full length album, until about a month ago we found out that we weren’t going to have any financial support for the recording. We decided to record what we could afford to record ourselves. This release is entirely self-funded, and we want to give it away to anyone that is interested in listening. If you feel so inclined, you can 'name your own price' and pay us whatever money you see fit for it." The release earned the band numerous awards and nominations including wins for "Best Act" from The Boston Phoenix, and "Album/EP of the Year" at the Boston Music Awards.

As the year drew to a close, the band announced plans for their forthcoming third studio recording.

=== Youth Companion (2012–2013) ===
Mean Creek announced via their social networks that they had entered the recording studio on December 28, 2011 to begin recording their next full-length album at 1867 Studios with Chris McLaughlin.

Tracking was completed on January 14, and mixing began on January 18.

The album, named Youth Companion, was released in 2012.

=== Local Losers (2013–2014) ===
Almost a year after the release of Youth Companion, the band announced that they would be working on a new studio album called Local Losers. The lead single from the album, "Cool Town", was released a few months later, followed by the second single, "My Madeline", in early 2014. The album was released on April 8, 2014.

It has also appeared that former bassist Erik Wormwood was replaced by a new member of the band, Kevin Macdonald. Erik left to focus on family and the arrival of his first child.

=== Disbanding (2015) ===
On May 4, 2015, the band announced they would be disbanding following a concert on July 25 at The Middle East in Cambridge. Following the band's split, multi instrumentalist Mikey Holland stepped out from the drums into the spotlight fronting his rock 'n' roll band The Dazies. He has released several EP's including "Levon Helm" 2015, "Love/Joy" 2015, "Hungover & Weird" 2016 with an LP "Panic All The Time" and a split 10" with Boston rockers Courters all due 2017. Aurore Ounjian became the lead guitarist for the band Beach Slang in December 2016.

== Line-up ==
- Chris Keene - lead vocals, rhythm guitar (2006-2015)
- Kevin Macdonald - bass (2013-2015)
- Aurore Ounjian - backing vocals, lead guitar (2006-2015)
- Mikey Holland - drums (2006-2015)

=== Former members ===
- Erik Wormwood - bass (2006-2013)

== Discography ==
=== Albums ===
- Around the Bend (2007)
- The Sky (Or the Underground) (2009)
- Youth Companion (2012)
- Local Losers (2014)

=== Singles and EPs ===
- "The Comedian" (2010)
- Hemophiliac EP (2011)
- "The Land Of Hopes & Dreams" (2011)
- "Young & Wild" (2012)
- "Cool Town" (2013)
- "My Madeline" (2014)
- "Forgotten Streets" (2015)

=== Compilations ===
- 2011 Old Flame Records Summer Sampler

== Awards and accolades ==
=== 2008 ===
- "10 Bands to Check Out" - The Improper Bostonian
- "Outstanding Americana Act" - the Boston Music Awards (Nomination)

=== 2009 ===
- "New Act of the Year" - the Boston Music Awards (Win)

=== 2010 ===
- "Boston’s Best Act" - The Boston Phoenix (Win)
- "Song of the Year" - the Boston Music Awards (Nomination)
- "Album of the Year" - the Boston Music Awards (Nomination)

=== 2011 ===
- "Best Act" - The Boston Phoenix (Win)
- "Best EP/Album" - The Boston Phoenix (Nomination)
- "Best Male Vocals" - The Boston Phoenix (Win)
- "Best Boston Accents Song of the Year" - The Boston Phoenix
- "Artist of the Year" - the Boston Music Awards (Nomination)
- "EP/Album of the Year" - the Boston Music Awards (Win)
- "Song of the Year" - the Boston Music Awards (Nomination)
