= Luddite (EP) =

EP by Grotus
- Released: 1992
- Recorded: August 1992
- Studio: Dancing Dog Studios (Emeryville, CA)
- Genre: Industrial rock
- Length: 15:39
- Label: Spirit Music
- Producer: Grotus, Damien Rasmussen

Grotus chronology
Brown (1991)	Luddite (1992)	Slow Motion Apocalypse (1993)

Professional ratings
Review scores
Source	Rating
Allmusic	3/5 stars

Luddite is an EP by Grotus, released in 1992 by Spirit Music Industries.

== Release and reception ==
In writing for AllMusic, critic Ned Raggett said, "finding its own way around industrial/rock fusions without simply recreating Ministry or Nine Inch Nails, the foursome explores grinding rhythms without an eye to either thrash metal or dancefloors, Lars Fox's roared vocals calling the tune (or lack thereof)." He awarded it three stars, concluding that "Luddite makes for a good slice of Grotus at its pre-major-label peak." Trouser Press noted that the music benefited by possessing a greater variance in composition structure and tighter focus in musicianship, helping to reinforce the band's message.

== Track listing ==
All lyrics are written by Lars Fox; all music is composed by Grotus.

No.	Title	Length
1.	"Luddite"	4:33
2.	"Marginal"	3:16
3.	"Shelf Life"	3:53
4.	"What in the World"	3:57

1993 CD bonus tracks
No.	Title	Length
5.	"Brown"	6:03

== Personnel ==
Adapted from the Luddite liner notes.

Grotus

- Bruce Boyd – drums
- John Carson – bass guitar, keyboards, sampler
- Lars Fox – vocals, sampler
- Adam Tanner – sampler, keyboards, guitar, 6-string bass guitar

Production and additional personnel

- Grotus – production
- Dan Poppe – executive producer
- Damien Rasmussen – production, engineering
- Frank Wiedemann – photography, design

== Release history ==
Region	Date	Label	Format	Catalog
United States	1992	Spirit Music	CD	SMI014
United States	1993	Alternative Tentacles	CD, LP	VIRUS 128
