= Everything Matters But No One Is Listening =

Studio album by Beach Slang
- Released: May 18, 2018
- Length: 32:28
- Label: Polyvinyl

Beach Slang chronology
A Loud Bash of Teenage Feelings (2016)	Everything Matters But; No One Is Listening (2018)	The Deadbeat Bang of Heartbreak City (2020)

Professional ratings
Aggregate scores
Source	Rating
Metacritic	62/100
Review scores
Source	Rating
AllMusic	3/5 stars
Paste	6.5/10
Pitchfork	5.4/10
The Skinny	3/5 stars

Everything Matters But No One Is Listening is the debut studio album by Beach Slang's lead singer James Alex and his side project Quiet Slang. It was released on May 18, 2018 under Polyvinyl Record Co.

== Critical reception ==
Everything Matters But No One Is Listening was met with generally favorable reviews from critics. At Metacritic, which assigns a weighted average rating out of 100 to reviews from mainstream publications, this release received an average score of 62, based on 5 reviews.

== Track listing ==
Everything Matters But No One Is Listening track listing
No.	Title	Length
1.	"Bad Art & Weirdo Ideas"	4:10
2.	"Noisy Heaven"	2:42
3.	"Future Mixtape for the Art Kids"	3:00
4.	"Filthy Luck"	2:35
5.	"Dirty Cigarettes"	3:23
6.	"Too Late to Die Young"	2:36
7.	"Spin the Dial"	3:30
8.	"Young Hearts"	4:10
9.	"Throwaways"	2:58
10.	"Warpaint"
Total length:		103:24

== Charts ==
Chart performance for Everything Matters But No One Is Listening
Chart (2018)	Peak position
US Heatseekers Albums (Billboard)	11
US Independent Albums (Billboard)	39
