= Ex Friends =

American punk rock band

- Origin: Philadelphia, Pennsylvania, U.S.
- Genres: Punk rock
- Years active: 2011-Present
- Labels: Paper + Plastick; Yo-Yo
- Members: Joel Tannenbaum (vocals), Jayme Guokas(guitar), Audrey Crash (bass), JP Flexner (drums)

Ex Friends is an American punk rock band founded in 2011 by Plow United bassist Joel Tannenbaum and artist JP Flexner. Based in Philadelphia, they have released records on Paper + Plastick and Yo-Yo Records.

== History ==
Ex Friends was formed backstage at Riot Fest East in Philadelphia on September 24, 2011, where Flexner drummed for Pennsylvania pop-punk band Weston and Tannenbaum played bass for Plow United's first performance in 13 years. The two were soon joined by bassist Audrey Crash (Myles of Destruction) and guitarist Jayme Guokas.

The band entered the studio after only a handful of rehearsals, recording their first EP, No Wonder We Prefer The Dark with Creep Records' founder Arik Victor. Paper + Plastick released the record on September 24, 2012, one year to the day after the Plow United reunion at Riot Fest.

In January 2013 they released the Twisted Around EP on German punk label Yo-Yo Records. It contained a cover of Plow United's "West Chester Nuclear Winter," from the band's third album Narcolepsy.

The video for single "Dirty Ben Franklin," taken from forthcoming album Rules for Making Up Words debuted on Vice Magazine's video site Noisey in September 2013. The track became available for download the same day.

Ex Friends has played frequently in the Mid-Atlantic region, including dates with The Dead Milkmen and Smoking Popes. They are slated to open for Marky Ramone's Blitzkrieg featuring Andrew WK October 6 and Doc Hopper October 12.

== Discography ==
Year	Title	Label	Other information
2012	No Wonder We Prefer the Dark	Paper + Plastick	Debut EP
2013	Twisted Around	Yo-Yo Records	EP
2013	Rules For Making Up Words	Paper + Plastick	Full-length album
