= Weston (band) =

American band

- Origin: Bethlehem, Pennsylvania
- Genres: Pop-punk, indie rock
- Years active: 1990-2001, 2006-2011, 2015, 2018
- Labels: Gern Blandsten; Go Kart; Rubber; Mojo; Black Shirt Music
- Past members: Dave Weston; Chuck Saltern; Jeremiah Attansio; Mark Kale; Chris Benner; James Alex Snyder; Jesse Short; Tim Snyder

Weston is a punk rock band hailing from Bethlehem, Pennsylvania. Founded in 1990, they took their name from singer Dave Weston's family, since his parents allowed them to practice in their basement. The band never found mainstream success but their energetic and irreverent live shows earned them legendary status amongst their peers as well as their fans. Following their major label debut, the band split up. It was announced on October 17, 2006, that Weston would be reuniting for three shows in late December. This led to even more reunion shows in following years and a live album released December 2009.

== Bio ==
=== Early history ===
The band started out as a 5-piece post-hardcore act with some melodic leanings in 1990. After some time refining a sound and a live show, the band released the Thursdaytown 1981 7-inch in 1992. Outtakes from this same session would later appear on the (possibly) unofficial Perfectly Good Dishwasher 7-inch along with an interview. They gained a strong local reputation around this time and in the years to follow for their wildly energetic and often unpredictably goofy live shows. Vocalist Dave Weston would often perform in his underwear. Guitarist Mark Kale parted ways with the group to form a new band known as The ICK with Tom Patterson of Slingshot Dakota. To keep their full sound, they recruited James Alex Snyder (future singer/guitarist in Beach Slang) for 2nd guitar and backup vocals. Even early on, Weston did not handle all lead vocals, some songs featured vocals by bassist Chuck Saltern, who was developing his own songwriting style that was complementary to Weston's. The band made sparing use of harmonies between the two, which would greatly increase with the addition of Snyder.

Following the lineup change, the band recorded and released a handful of split 7-inches with area bands and signed with Gern Blandsten Records for their first LP release in 1994. Entitled A Real Life Story of Teenage Rebellion, the record showed the band's shift to a decidedly more pop-punk sound with lyrics that matched the theme hinted at in the title. Two tracks from the Thursdaytown 1981 EP reappeared on the album, much tighter and polished. Weston and Saltern shared almost equal time as lead vocalist, and the vocal harmonies greatly increased, becoming one of the band's strongest qualities. Following the release of the album, guitarist Chris Benner quit the group to form his own band, Digger, and Weston took over his spot on guitar rather than find a replacement. The band released a single of new material and a collection of vinyl-only tracks entitled Splitsville before parting with Gern and heading to Go Kart Records.

=== Go Kart Records ===
The band arguably enjoyed their highest level of success while on Go Kart. In 1996, they released Got Beat Up, considered by many fans to be their best work. James Snyder took on a much more prominent role for this record, contributing lead vocals to about 2/3 of the album. Weston and Saltern switched for the others, and at many times all took part in three part harmony. They even began adding more harmonies to older songs as part of their live show. This quality set the band apart from most in the genre. The pop-punk boom in the mainstream at the time (due to bands like Green Day and Rancid) combined with the band's rising friends and contemporaries the Bouncing Souls and Lifetime put a good deal of attention on Weston. They became well known in the PA/NJ/NY tri-state area and enjoyed a modest amount of success. There were rumors of major label offers, but the band chose to remain on indie Go Kart. In the midst of all of this, founding member and bassist/vocalist Chuck Saltern left the band. Prior to leaving, he helped to write and record two new songs for a split single with Digger. To many fans, this essentially ended the band they knew as Weston. He was replaced by Jesse Short, a friend from fellow Lehigh Valley band Walter Krug. This new lineup would last until the end of the band.

With Short in tow, the band recorded their next LP, Matinee. It contained re-recordings of both songs from the Digger split, as well as nine new tracks. Most noticeably, Snyder had taken over nearly all lead vocals, leaving Weston with just one song and one for newcomer Short. The album had a near-linear story and was meant to unfold like the plot of a movie, as evidenced by the projector sounds bookending the music and the liner notes arranged like a script. The band's sense of humor was still very present in the liner notes, but the music began to take a more serious turn, which disappointed some longtime fans. Many new fans were enjoying this sound, though, and the band's popularity continued to rise. Following this release, Weston departed Go Kart.

=== Later years and breakup ===
Left in record label limbo, the band chose Australian-based Rubber Records for their follow-up LP. Without any North American distribution, the Return to Mono album was near impossible for most fans to find as it was only available in Japan. Import copies ranged from $30–40, and the band themselves had no copies on the following tours. A single was released for the tribute song "Liz Phair" which was featured in EA's 1999 video game, Street Sk8er, and "Bus Stop" appeared in demo form on a local PA compilation. The album followed the same musical path of Matinee, and Snyder remained mostly on lead vocals. Some songs went for a darker, more "heavy" feel, which seemed out of place among the majority of poppy tracks. Other tracks hinted at a sound much closer to indie pop than punk rock. Weston contributed two songs that were much closer to the band's early material, and again Short had one song. Their live shows were tighter and more professional than ever, though still retaining some of the old silliness, but the songs were mostly unknown due to the record's unavailability and the band's popularity quickly waned.

In February 2000, the band signed with Mojo Records, a subsidiary of Universal. They released a 7-inch as a teaser, containing demos of two brand new Snyder-penned songs. They were very similar in sound to the Pixies, a transition in sound the band had been slowly making since Matinee. Their final LP, The Massed Albert Sounds was released on Mojo in September 2000. It contained re-recordings of several songs from Return to Mono, including the tracks "Radio" and "Liz Phair", which had already appeared on both the previous album and Matinee. The album ventured even further into the vocal harmonies the band had been known for, sounding almost Brian Wilson-ish at times. The liner notes touted the "art of live production", saying that the band felt that leaving mistakes and first takes in caught the feel of a live show better, but the album still sounded far more "produced" than any other release. For the tour and live shows following the album's release, a third guitarist (Jeff Kish of Latrobe, PA band Dawson High) and keyboardist (Jason Adams) were brought along to reproduce sounds on the album the band could not replicate as a four-piece. Massed Albert was seen by many as a chance to return the band to a local and national spotlight, but it did neither and the band split up the following year with little fanfare, playing their final show February 9 at the Pontiac Grille in Philadelphia.

=== Post-breakup ===
Dave Weston went on to play sporadic solo shows in the area. He also played in Julia Marvel. James Alex Snyder formed the band Cordova, following up on much of the sound he'd pushed for on later Weston recordings. It was announced on October 17, 2006, that Weston would be reuniting for three shows in late December. June 2007 saw the announcement of even more reunion shows, that took place July 5 and 6 in Philadelphia and New York City, respectively. On July 7, Chuck Saltern took the stage with Weston for the first time in over 10 years at Slaskifest in Northampton, Pennsylvania. Saltern returned to bass/vocal duties while Jesse Short played third guitar. Another show was scheduled for Maxwell's in Hoboken in mid-August. The lineup for the other reunion shows was the lineup that performed from the time of Matinee until the end of the band.

On April 4, 2008, Weston performed a reunion show in Philadelphia at the Khyber with The Ergs, the Sw!ms, and Brian McGee & The Hollow Seed. This marked the beginning of a reunion tour scheduled so far to circle the northeast. The next night on April 5, Weston played a headlining show at the Middle East (Upstairs) in Cambridge, Massachusetts, on April 5, 2008.

Weston recorded a live album at Maxwell's in Hoboken, New Jersey, on June 28, 2008, where they performed some new material. The resulting live album, This Is My Voice and This is my Heart: Live at Maxwell's, was released on December 14, 2009.

Weston played another show at Maxwell's on June 4, 2011. Original drummer Jeremiah Attanasio reunited with the band that night. James Snyder confirmed that the band has entered the studio to record a new album which was intended for release by the end of 2011. However, no further information on the album has since been confirmed and the band is not currently active.

In 2014, James Alex Snyder formed Beach Slang. On January 5, 2021, James Alex was accused of emotional abuse by the band's former manager and tour manager, Charlie Lowe. The band's social media pages went offline the following day. On January 12, 2021, a statement was published on the band's Instagram account, stating that James Alex's behaviour was a result of "severe mental health issues" and that the band had split up. It also states that he is currently "an inpatient facility after attempting to take his life".

== Band members ==
- Dave Weston - vocals (1990–2001, 2006-2011), guitar (1994–2001, 2006–2011)
- Chuck Saltern - bass, vocals (1990–1996, 2008)
- Jeremiah Attanasio - drums (1990–2001, 2006-2011)
- Mark Kale - guitar (1990–1992)
- Chris Benner - guitar (1990–1994)
- James Alex Snyder - guitar, vocals (1992–2001, 2006–2011)
- Jesse Short - bass, vocals (1996–2001, 2006–2011)
- Tim "Chicken" Snyder - drums (2006–2010; various live shows)
- Jeff Kish - guitar (touring, 1999-2000)
- Jason Adams - keyboards (touring, 1999-2000)

== Discography ==
=== Albums ===
- A Real Life Story of Teenage Rebellion (Gern Blandsten Records, 1994)
- Got Beat Up (Go Kart Records, 1996)
- Matinee: Music from the Soundtrack (Go Kart Records, 1997)
- Return to Mono (Rubber Records / Toy's Factory, 1999)
- The Massed Albert Sounds (Mojo Records, 2000)

=== Compilation albums ===
- Splitsville (Gern Blandsten Records, 1996)

=== Live albums ===
- The Stepchildren of Rock (Split with Doc Hopper) (Go Kart Records, 1998)
- This is my Voice and This is my Heart: Live at Maxwell's LP, Digital (Black Shirt Music, 2009)

=== Singles ===
- Thursdaytown 1981 (Mammy Records, 1992)
- Flower b/w Feelings Stupit Feelings (FOE Records)
- split with Strychnine and the Rat Traps (FOE Records, 1994)
- A Perfectly Good Dishwasher (Wolf Records, 199?)
- split with Plow United (Coolidge Records, 1994)
- split with Sticks and Stones (Reservoir Records, 1995)
- split with Bouncing Souls (GLUE Records, 1995)
- Retarded b/w Teenage Love Affair (Gern Blandsten Records, 1995)
- New Shirt/Heather Lewis (Go Kart Records)
- Your Summer Dresses Bore Me (Go Kart / Face Down Records)
- Wilkum to Pennsylvania (Split with Digger) (Hopeless Records, 1996)
- MOJO Records Demonstrative Recordings (Mojo Records, 2000)
- The Massed Albert Sampler: Selections from The Massed Albert Sounds (Mojo Records, 2000)
- To Some I'm Genius (Mojo Records, 2000)

=== Compilation appearances ===
- Get The Hell Out: A Compilation of the L.V.'s Rockingest Bands CD (FOE Records)
  - song "Naked And Alone"
- Xanadu: Music For The Future CD (Rhetoric Records)
  - song "So Hard To Say Goodbye"
- Music Does A Body Good: A Hardcore/Punk Compilation LP/CD (GLUE Records 006)
  - song "Redhead Girl"
- The Spandex Experiment: Punk Bands Reviving 80's Metal Sweetness CD (Double Deuce Records)
  - song "She Don't Know Me"
- Punk Uprisings Vol 1. CD (Lookout Records)
  - song "No Kind of Superstar (Demo)"
- Show & Tell: A Stormy Remembrance of TV Theme Songs CD (Which? Records)
  - song "WKRP in Cincinnati"
- Fer Shure: A Tribute to the Valley Girl Soundtrack CD (Itchy Korean Records)
  - song "Jukebox (Don't Put Another Dime)"
- Go Kart vs The Corporate Giant CD (Go Kart Records)
  - songs "Retarded" & "Return to Horse Valley"
- The Caroline Distribution/Alliance Entertainment CD Sampler CD (Caroline Distribution)
  - song "Just Like You"
- Expose Yourself CD (Go Kart/Black Rat)
  - song "My Favourite Mistake"
- Mentos: The Freshmaker Tour - Fresh 3 (Zark Records)
  - song "Indy Rockstar"
- Where Is My Mind? A Tribute to the Pixies LP (CLEAR VINYL) / CD (Glue Factory, 1999)
  - song "La La, Love You"
- This Is The Lehigh Valley, Not South Park! (FOE Records, 1999)
  - song "Bus Stop"
- Songs For the Broken Hearted CD (Glue Factory, 1999)
  - Song "Eternally"
- Pepsi Wild Caps (EMI-Capitol)
  - song "Liz Phair"
- Master Lock: Master Mix (EMI-Capitol)
  - song "Liz Phair"
- Skechers: Spring Sonic CD Sampler (EMI-Capitol)
  - song "Liz Phair"
- Chrysalis Current Cream of the Crop (Chrysalis Music Group)
  - song "Liz Phair"
- Lubricated (Rubber Records)
  - songs "Liz Phair" & "Radio"
- Hopeless Records' 50th Release CD (Hopeless Records)
  - song "Mrs. Perfect Girl"
- The Solution to Benefit Heal The Bay CD (MOJO RECORDS)
  - song "Liz Phair"
- CMJ Certain Damage Vol. 120 (CMJ)
  - song "To Some I'm Genius"
- Gern Blandsten: The First Nine Years CD (Gern Blandsten, 2001)
  - song "Little Mile '94"
- Insubordination Fest: Baltimore MD '08 CD/DVD (Insubordination Records, 2009)
  - song "Retarded"
- Massed Matinee Rebellion: A Return to Beat Upsville CD (TerrorPoP Records,2011)
  - songs "Uninspired (live) and In The First Place (live)"
