= Mass (Grotus album) =

Studio album by Grotus
- Released: March 19, 1996
- Recorded: Spring 1995 at Decibel Worship, SF, CA
- Genre: Alternative rock, industrial rock
- Length: 40:41
- Label: London Records
- Producer: Chris Arvan

Grotus chronology
| The Opiate of the Masses (1994) | Mass (1996) |

Singles from Mass
- 1. "Hand to Mouth" Released: 1995

Professional ratings
Review scores
| Source | Rating |
|---|---|
| AllMusic | 2.5/5 stars |
| The Encyclopedia of Popular Music | 3/5 stars |
| RIP | 4/5 stars |

Mass is the third and last full-length album by the experimental band Grotus. The album's sound focuses more on alternative and blues rock than industrial and is perhaps their most accessible recording. The band broke up the same year the album was released.

== Critical reception ==
The St. Louis Post-Dispatch called the album "snot-nosed, sludgehammer rock that comes off like a minor league Wax Trax act," writing that "it flashes with brilliant bits, such as 'Taint Nobody's Bizness If I Do,' which sports out-of-tune piano pounding augmented by sequences and raunchy talk-show samples." Ox-Fanzine called it "just plain boring, a pounding piece of pseudo-experimental alternative rumble."

== Track listing ==
1. "That's Entertainment" - 2:32
2. "A Bad Itch" - 3:20
3. "White Trash Blues" - 3:56
4. "Ebola Reston" - 4:12
5. "Hand to Mouth" - 2:57
6. "T'Ain't Nobody's Bizness If I Do" - 4:04
7. "Sick" - 3:04
8. "Collect 'Em All" - 4:25
9. "Wild Bill" - 3:30
10. "The Bottom Line" - 3:31
11. "Back in the Day" - 4:10

== Personnel ==
=== Grotus ===
- Bruce Boyd - drums, turntables
- John Carson - bass, sampler, electronics, synthesizer
- Lars Fox - vocals, drums, sampling
- Adam Tanner - Fender bass, string bass, guitar, sampling, electronics

=== Production ===
- Chris Arvan - production, engineering
