= Brown (Grotus album) =

Studio album by Grotus
- Released: 1991
- Recorded: 1990 – 1991
- Studio: Various: C.D. Studios; (San Francisco, CA); Dancing Dog Studios; (Emeryville, CA)
- Genre: Industrial rock
- Length: 39:37
- Label: Spirit Music
- Producer: Damien Rasmussen

Grotus chronology
Brown (1991)	Luddite (1992)

Professional ratings
Review scores
Source	Rating
AllMusic	4/5 stars
The Encyclopedia of Popular Music	3/5 stars

Brown is the debut studio album of the industrial rock band Grotus. It was released in 1991 by Spirit Music Industries.

== Track listing ==
All lyrics are written by Lars Fox; all music is composed by Grotus, except "Las Vegas Power Grid" and "Full Metal Grotus", which are co-written with Marc Henry.

No.	Title	Length
1.	"Brown"	3:49
2.	"Malthusela"	4:22
3.	"A City of the Dead"	0:45
4.	"Las Vegas Power Grid"	2:46
5.	"Pharmaceutical"	3:42
6.	"Edward Abbey"	3:27
7.	"Daisy Chain"	2:46
8.	"Valhalla's Celtic Robbie"	2:45
9.	"You Fit the Suit"	0:26
10.	"Full Metal Grotus"	2:31
11.	"New York Strip"	5:23
12.	"Rust"	2:34
13.	"Morning-Glory"	4:21

== Personnel ==
Adapted from the Brown liner notes.

Grotus

- John Carson – bass guitar, sampler
- Lars Fox – vocals, sampler
- Adam Tanner – sampler, guitar, 6-string bass guitar

Additional musicians

- Bruce Boyd – drums
- Marc Henry – drum programming (1, 4, 5, 10)
- Dan Poppe – additional drums (2, 11), executive producer

Production and additional personnel

- David Bryson – engineering (6, 8)
- John Golden – mastering
- Keith Moreau – editing
- Damien Rasmussen – production, engineering
- Frank Wiedemann – photography, design

== Release history ==
Region	Date	Label	Format	Catalog
United States	1991	Spirit Music	CD	FTD007CD
