= Flag of Democracy =

American hardcore punk band

- Origin: Ambler, Pennsylvania, U.S.
- Genres: Hardcore punk
- Years active: 1982–present
- Labels: Creep Records, Motherbox Records, Bitzcore Records, SRA Records
- Members: Jim McMonagle; Dave Rochon; Bob Walker
- Past members: Zeke Zagar; Mike Giannone
- Website: www.flagofdemocracy.net

Flag of Democracy, sometimes abbreviated as F.O.D., is an American hardcore punk band formed in 1982 and originally from Ambler, Pennsylvania, a suburb of Philadelphia.

In November 1982, the band played their first show, opening for Minor Threat, Agnostic Front, and SS Decontrol. During the 1980s and '90s the band embarked on international tours.

On November 30, 2007, F.O.D. played their 25th anniversary show at the First Unitarian Church of Philadelphia. In 2015, SRA Records remastered and reissued a handful of their albums for that year's Record Store Day.

== Band members ==
Current members

- Jim McMonagle – vocals, guitar (1982–present)
- Dave Rochon – bass guitar, vocals (1983–present)
- Bob Walker – drums (1986–present)

Former members

- Zeke Zagar – bass guitar (1982–1983)
- Mike Giannone – drums (1982–1986)

Timeline

== Discography ==
Full-length albums

- Shatter Your Day LP (1986, Buy Our Records. Remastered & reissued, 2013 SRA as 2xLP/2xCD/Tape)
- 23 CD/LP/Tape (1988, Buy Our Records. Remastered & Reissued, 2013 SRA)
- Down With People CD/LP (1990, Bitzcore Records)
- Schneller! CD/LP (1993, Bitzcore Records)
- Hate Rock CD/LP (1994, Bitzcore Records)
- Everything Sucks CD/LP (1996, Bitzcore Records)
- FOD World CD/LP (2000, Creep Records)
- Home Lobotomy Kit CD (2010, Motherbox Records)
- No School, No Core CD/LP/Tape (2018, SRA Records, Boss Tuneage, Waterslide Records)

Singles and EPs

- Love Songs 7" (1984 Speed Of Sound Records; re-released in 1990 as Eight Love Songs, Bitzcore Records, re-released in 2013 on cassette and download on SRA Records with unreleased versions included)
- Split 7" w/ Ninefinger (1994)
- Split 7" w/ The Dead Milkmen (2015, SRA Records)

Compilation appearances

- Get Off My Back compilation LP (1983, Red Music - "Murder Castle", "Suburban Cowboy")
- Flipside Vinyl Fanzine Vol. 1 compilation LP (1984, Gasatanka Records -"Madhouse")
- Another Shot For Bracken compilation LP (1986, Positive Force Records - "The Family Knows")
- Nothing Lasts 7" compilation (1991 Flex Records/Bitzcore - "Shatter Your Day")
- The Best Of Flipside Vinyl Fanzines 2xCD compilation (1993, Flipside Records - "Madhouse")
- For A Fistful Of Yen CD compilation (1994, Bitzcore Records - "Powerload")
- Fuck Loud Music CD compilation (1994, Ox Fanzine - "Gasoline Suit")
- A Joint Effort Between / Uno Sforzo Comune Fra Dynamo Magazine E Audioglobe Records Flexi 7" promo compilation (1995, Dynamo! - "Bleaurgh")
- More Kaos CD compilation (1997, Motherbox Records - "Punk Gun")
- Philly Shreds Volume 1 compilation LP (1999, Schuylkill Records - "Razor Wire")
- The Last Stake Has Been Driven compilation CD (2001, Creep Records - "Trailpass")
- Tomorrow Will Be Worse Vol. 3 compilation LP (2002, Sound Pollution Records - "Umi Heto", "#1", "Majin Go")
