= WKDU =

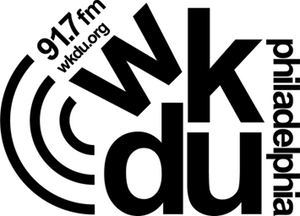
- Philadelphia, Pennsylvania; United States
- Broadcast area: Philadelphia
- Frequency: 91.7 MHz

Programming
- Format: College radio

Ownership
- Owner: Drexel University

History
- First air date: July 17, 1971
- Call sign meaning: WK Drexel University

Technical information
- Licensing authority: FCC
- Facility ID: 17596
- Class: A
- ERP: 800 watts
- HAAT: 47.0 meters (154.2 ft)
- Transmitter coordinates: 39°57′36.4″N 75°11′25.6″W

Links
- Public license information: Public file; LMS
- Webcast: Listen Live
- Website: wkdu.org

WKDU (91.7 FM) is a non-commercial educational radio station licensed to serve Philadelphia, Pennsylvania. It is owned by Drexel University and operated by Drexel students, with several alumni among its on-air staff. It is the only free-format non-commercial FM station in Philadelphia. Its transmitter is located atop Van Rensselaer Hall, a dormitory on the Drexel campus, in the University City section of Philadelphia. Its studio is in the basement of the Creese Student Center. WKDU was the 2010 and 2011 CMJ Station of the Year.

== History ==
Starting as carrier current station WMAX in 1958 (and later WXDT), WKDU began FM broadcasting on Saturday, July 17, 1971. In 1981, its power rating was raised from 10 watts to 110 watts, and in 1996, to 800 watts. WKDU originally shared time on its frequency with WPWT, a station established in the 1950s by Philadelphia Wireless Technical Institute. WPWT ceased operations in the late 1980s, allowing WKDU to extend its broadcast day to 24 hours on February 26, 1990. Previously, WKDU signed off between the hours of 2 PM to 10 PM.

WKDU gained Black listeners in the 1970s due to "The Black Experience in Music", a group of Black students who called themselves "communicators", rather than DJs, as they educated the Black communities in Drexel and Philadelphia about their cultural happenings. "The Black Experience" began in 1971 and responsible for much of the station's programming through the 1980s. As of 2025, "The Black Experience" is still running weekly.

== Programming ==
WKDU's musical format is free-form, meaning that playlists are dictated by the taste of the on-air DJs. In 1984, a progressive requirement was created and implemented to the Free Format music programming policy by then Music Director, Ginny McCracken. Each DJ can play whatever they want but at least 1/3 of their music must be a "new release".

WKDU is known for its annual Electronic Music Marathon, an event that raises money for charities in the Philadelphia area. The Electronic Music Marathon ran from 1997–2007, then returned in Fall 2014 after a seven-year hiatus.

The WKDU Reggae Marathon has been held annually since 1984, during the Memorial Day Weekend. This special program includes not just reggae, but other similar Caribbean genres, such as Soca.

A notable show on WKDU was "Sounds of Jerusalem" which ran from 1978 through 1994.

== Awards ==
- 2011 Station of the Year, CMJ College Radio Awards
- 2011 Champion of the Local Scene, CMJ College Radio Awards
- 2010 Station of the Year, CMJ College Radio Awards
- 2010 Champion of the Local Scene, CMJ College Radio Awards
- 2009 Best Local Jamaican Radio Station - Best of Jamaica in Philadelphia
- 2008 Best Local Jamaican Radio Station - Best of Jamaica in Philadelphia
- 2007 Best Local Jamaican Radio Station - Best of Jamaica in Philadelphia
- 2006 Best Local Jamaican Radio Station - Best of Jamaica in Philadelphia
- 2005 Best Local Jamaican Radio Station - Best of Jamaica in Philadelphia
- 2003 Best Local Jamaican Radio Station - Best of Jamaica in Philadelphia
